= 2015 BC Lions season =

Canadian football team season

- General manager: Wally Buono
- Head coach: Jeff Tedford
- Home stadium: BC Place Stadium

Results
- Record: 7–11
- Division place: 3rd, West
- Playoffs: Lost West Semi-Final
- Team MOP: Adam Bighill
- Team MOC: Andrew Harris
- Team MOR: Jonathon Jennings

Uniform

The 2015 BC Lions season was the 58th season for the team in the Canadian Football League (CFL) and their 62nd overall. The Lions qualified for the playoffs for the 19th straight year, but lost the West Semi-Final game to the Calgary Stampeders. This was the team's first and only season under new head coach, Jeff Tedford, former head coach at California, and the 13th under general manager Wally Buono.

For the sixth consecutive season, the Lions held their training camp at Hillside Stadium in Kamloops, British Columbia, with rookie camp beginning Wednesday, May 27, and main camp beginning on Sunday, May 31. Due to scheduling conflicts with the 2015 FIFA Women's World Cup, the Lions' home pre-season game was played at Thunderbird Stadium on the main campus of the University of British Columbia.

== Offseason ==
=== Free agents ===
Position	Player	2015 team	Date signed	Notes
LB	Jason Arakgi	BC Lions	Jan. 8, 2015	Three-year contract
QB	Kevin Glenn	Saskatchewan Roughriders	Feb. 19, 2015	
WR	Ernest Jackson	Ottawa Redblacks	Feb. 10, 2015	
DB	J. R. LaRose			
LS/LB	Jordan Matechuk			Released Jan. 28, 2015

=== CFL draft ===
The 2015 CFL draft took place on May 12, 2015. The Lions had eight selections in the seven-round draft, gaining another fifth-round pick following the trade of Seydou Junior Haidara to Hamilton.

Round	Pick	Player	Position	School/club team
1	5	Ese Mrabure-Ajufo	DL	Wilfrid Laurier
2	14	Brett Boyko	OL	Nevada, Las Vegas
3	23	Shaquille Murray-Lawrence	RB	Nevada, Las Vegas
4	32	Adrian Clarke	LB	Bishop's
5	41	Campbell Allison	OL	Eastern Michigan
5	43	Christian Covington	DL	Rice
6	49	Joshua Brinkworth	DB	Pacific
7	58	Maxx Forde	DE	Idaho

== Preseason ==
Week	Date	Kickoff	Opponent	Results		TV	Venue	Attendance	Summary
Week	Date	Kickoff	Opponent	Score	Record	TV	Venue	Attendance	Summary
A	Bye								
B	Fri, June 12	6:30 p.m. PDT	at Calgary Stampeders	L 6–20	0–1	TSN2	McMahon Stadium	28,557	Recap
C	Fri, June 19	7:00 p.m. PDT	vs. Edmonton Eskimos	L 13–18	0–2	None	Thunderbird Stadium	6,117	Recap

# Games played with colour uniforms.

== Regular season ==
=== Standings ===
West Division
Team	GP	W	L	PF	PA	Pts	
Edmonton Eskimos	18	14	4	466	341	28	Details
Calgary Stampeders	18	14	4	478	346	28	Details
BC Lions	18	7	11	437	486	14	Details
Winnipeg Blue Bombers	18	5	13	353	502	10	Details
Saskatchewan Roughriders	18	3	15	430	563	6	Details

=== Schedule ===
Week	Date	Kickoff	Opponent	Results		TV	Venue	Attendance	Summary
Week	Date	Kickoff	Opponent	Score	Record	TV	Venue	Attendance	Summary
1	Bye								
2	Sat, July 4	3:00 p.m. PDT	at Ottawa Redblacks	L 16–27	0–1	TSN/RDS2	TD Place Stadium	24,376	Recap
3	Fri, July 10	7:00 p.m. PDT	vs. Saskatchewan Roughriders	W 35–32 (OT)	1–1	TSN/RDS	BC Place	23,062	Recap
4	Fri, July 17	7:00 p.m. PDT	at Saskatchewan Roughriders	W 27–24	2–1	TSN/RDS	Mosaic Stadium	26,159	Recap
5	Fri, July 24	7:00 p.m. PDT	vs. Toronto Argonauts	L 27–30	2–2	TSN/RDS2	BC Place	20,085	Recap
6	Thurs, July 30	5:30 p.m. PDT	at Winnipeg Blue Bombers	L 13–23	2–3	TSN/RDS/ESPN2	Investors Group Field	27,214	Recap
7	Thurs, Aug 6	7:00 p.m. PDT	vs. Edmonton Eskimos	W 26–23	3–3	TSN/RDS2/ESPN2	BC Place	20,316	Recap
8	Sat, Aug 15	4:00 p.m. PDT	at Hamilton Tiger-Cats	L 22–52	3–4	TSN/RDS	Tim Hortons Field	24,110	Recap
9	Thurs, Aug 20	7:00 p.m. PDT	vs. Montreal Alouettes	L 13–23	3–5	TSN/RDS	BC Place	20,977	Recap
10	Bye								
11	Thurs, Sept 3	4:30 p.m. PDT	at Montreal Alouettes	W 25–16	4–5	TSN/RDS	Molson Stadium	21,885	Recap
12	Sun, Sept 13	1:00 p.m. PDT	vs. Ottawa Redblacks	L 18–31	4–6	TSN	BC Place	19,833	Recap
13	Fri, Sept 18	6:00 p.m. PDT	at Calgary Stampeders	L 23–35	4–7	TSN/RDS2	McMahon Stadium	31,586	Recap
14	Sat, Sept 26	1:00 p.m. PDT	at Edmonton Eskimos	L 23–29	4–8	TSN	Commonwealth Stadium	29,148	Recap
15	Sat, Oct 3	4:00 p.m. PDT	vs. Saskatchewan Roughriders	W 46–20	5–8	TSN	BC Place	24,554	Recap
16	Sat, Oct 10	7:00 p.m. PDT	vs. Winnipeg Blue Bombers	L 26–29	5–9	TSN	BC Place	19,826	Recap
17	Sat, Oct 17	4:00 p.m. PDT	at Edmonton Eskimos	L 23–26 (2OT)	5–10	TSN	Commonwealth Stadium	28,517	Recap
18	Fri, Oct 23	7:00 p.m. PDT	vs. Hamilton Tiger-Cats	W 40–13	6–10	TSN	BC Place	20,058	Recap
19	Fri, Oct 30	4:00 p.m. PDT	at Toronto Argonauts	W 27–25	7–10	TSN	Rogers Centre	14,236	Recap
20	Sat, Nov 7	4:00 p.m. PST	vs. Calgary Stampeders	L 7–28	7–11	TSN	BC Place	22,900	Recap

# Games played with colour uniforms.
# Games played with white uniforms.

== Post-season ==
=== Schedule ===
Game	Date	Kickoff	Opponent	Results		TV	Venue	Attendance	Summary
Game	Date	Kickoff	Opponent	Score	Record	TV	Venue	Attendance	Summary
West Semi-Final	Sun, Nov 15	1:30 p.m. PST	at Calgary Stampeders	L 9–35	0–1	TSN/RDS	McMahon Stadium	26,306	Recap

# Games played with white uniforms.

== Roster ==
2015 BC Lions final roster
Quarterbacks: 10 Jonathon Jennings; 14 Travis Lulay; 2 Greg McGhee; Running backs: 33 Andrew Harris; 24 Pascal Lochard; 46 Rolly Lumbala; 35 Shaq Murray-Lawrence; 28 Chris Rainey; Receivers: 83 Stephen Adekolu; 16 Bryan Burnham; 17 Austin Collie; 85 Shawn Gore; 7 Lavelle Hawkins; 87 Marco Iannuzzi	Offensive linemen: 57 Tommie Draheim T; 50 Kirby Fabien G; 66 Jason Foster C; 62 Cody Husband G; 63 Jovan Olafioye T; 67 Hunter Steward G/T; 58 Cam Thorn C/G; Defensive linemen: 53 Alex Bazzie DE; 90 Mic'hael Brooks DT; 78 David Ménard DT/DE; 91 Zach Minter DT; 93 Craig Roh DE; 94 Khreem Smith DE; 99 Jabar Westerman DT/DE	Linebackers: 45 Jason Arakgi; 44 Adam Bighill; 41 Adrian Clarke; 35 Rennie Curran; 11 Alex Hoffman-Ellis; 8 Bo Lokombo; Defensive backs: 29 Steven Clarke; 37 Eric Fraser; 23 Josh Johnson; 6 T. J. Lee; 20 Keynan Parker; 26 Cord Parks; 9 Chris Rwabukamba; 25 Ronnie Yell; Special teams: 40 Mike Benson LS; 3 Richie Leone K/P	Reserve roster: 84 Emmanuel Arceneaux SB; 21 Ryan Phillips DB; Practice roster: 69 Josh Aladenoye T; 51 Campbell Allison T; 32 Casey Chin LB; 55 Jas Dhillon G; 19 Anthony Fera K/P; 48 Maxx Forde DT; 13 Terence Jeffers-Harris SB; 27 Darious Lane DB; 92 Lazarius Levingston DT; Injured list: 56 Solomon Elimimian LB; 18 Cameron Morrah SB; 98 Ese Mrabure-Ajufo DE; 59 Matt Norman C; 68 T-Dre Player G; 86 Courtney Taylor SB; 54 Dean Valli G; Italics indicate international players Roster updated 2026-05-17; Depth Chart • Transactions

== Coaching staff ==
2015 BC Lions staff
Front office and support staff: Owner – David Braley; President and ceo – Dennis Skulsky; General manager and vice president of football operations – Wally Buono; Director of Football Operations & Player Personnel – Neil McEvoy; Director of US Scouting - Ryan Rigmaiden; Player-Business Developmental Advisor - Geroy Simon; Football Operations Consultant, Scout - Roy Shivers; Area Scout - Mike McCarthy; Video Assistant - Andrew Millin; Head Trainer - Bill Reichelt; Assistant Athletic Therapist - Tristan Sandhu; Strength and Conditioning Trainer - Chris Boyko; Equipment Manager - Ken "Kato" Kasuya; Equipment Assistant - Andrew Dubiellak; Equipment Assistant - Stu Mitchell; Director of Communications - Jamie Cartmell; Head coaches: Head coach – Jeff Tedford; Offensive coaches: Offensive coordinator and quarterbacks – George Cortez; Running backs – Chuck McMann; Receivers – Khari Jones; Offensive line – Doug Malone; Offensive quality control – Quinn Tedford	Defensive coaches: Defensive coordinator and defensive backs – Mark Washington; Defensive line – Robin Ross; Linebackers – Johnny Holland; Defensive quality control and assistant defensive backs – Willie Fields; Special teams coaches: Special teams coordinator – Chuck McMann; Strength and conditioning: Strength and conditioning trainer – Chris Boyko; → Coaching staff
