= 2014 BC Lions season =

Canadian football team season

- General manager: Wally Buono
- Head coach: Mike Benevides
- Home stadium: BC Place Stadium

Results
- Record: 9–9
- Division place: 4th, West
- Playoffs: Lost East Semi-Final
- Team MOP: Solomon Elimimian
- Team MOC: Rolly Lumbala
- Team MOR: Josh Johnson

Uniform

The 2014 BC Lions season was the 57th season for the team in the Canadian Football League (CFL) and their 61st overall. The Lions qualified for the playoffs for the 18th straight year. However, the team lost the East Semi-Final to the Montreal Alouettes by a score of 50–17.

== Offseason ==
=== Free agents ===
Position	Player	2014 Team	Date Signed	Notes
DB	Josh Bell	Calgary Stampeders	Feb. 12, 2014	
RB	Stu Foord			
WR	Nick Moore	Winnipeg Blue Bombers	Feb. 11, 2014	
OL	Steve Myddelton	Hamilton Tiger-Cats	Feb. 11, 2014	
DE	Keron Williams			

=== CFL draft ===
The 2014 CFL draft took place on May 13, 2014. The Lions had seven selections in the draft, losing their first round selection after they traded for Kevin Glenn. They also had another second round selection following last season's trade with Edmonton for Mike Reilly.

Round	Pick	Player	Position	School/club team
2	12	Tchissakid Player	OL	Northwestern State
2	14	Pascal Lochard	FB	Laval
3	27	Casey Chin	LB	Simon Fraser
4	32	David Ménard	DL	Montreal
5	41	Alexander Fox	WR	Bishop's
6	50	Dylan Roper	DL	Simon Fraser
7	59	Guillaume Bourassa	RB	Laval

== Preseason ==
Week	Date	Kickoff	Opponent	Results		TV	Venue	Attendance	Summary
Week	Date	Kickoff	Opponent	Score	Record	TV	Venue	Attendance	Summary
A	Bye								
B	Fri, June 13	6:00 p.m. PDT	at Edmonton Eskimos	W 14–11	1–0	TSN	Commonwealth Stadium	25,963	Recap
C	Fri, June 20	7:00 p.m. PDT	vs. Calgary Stampeders	W 37–13	2–0	TSN	BC Place	26,445	Recap

# Games played with colour uniforms.

== Regular season ==
=== Standings ===
West Division
Team	GP	W	L	T	PF	PA	Pts	
Calgary Stampeders	18	15	3	0	511	347	30	Details
Edmonton Eskimos	18	12	6	0	492	340	24	Details
Saskatchewan Roughriders	18	10	8	0	399	441	20	Details
BC Lions	18	9	9	0	380	365	18	Details
Winnipeg Blue Bombers	18	7	11	0	397	481	14	Details

=== Schedule ===
Week	Date	Kickoff	Opponent	Results		TV	Venue	Attendance	Summary
Week	Date	Kickoff	Opponent	Score	Record	TV	Venue	Attendance	Summary
1	Sat, June 28	3:00 p.m. PDT	vs. Edmonton Eskimos	L 20–27	0–1	TSN/RDS2	BC Place	24,524	Recap
2	Fri, July 4	4:00 p.m. PDT	at Montreal Alouettes	L 9–24	0–2	TSN/RDS	Molson Stadium	20,018	Recap
3	Sat, July 12	6:30 p.m. PDT	at Saskatchewan Roughriders	W 26–13	1–2	TSN/RDS2	Mosaic Stadium at Taylor Field	32,864	Recap
4	Sat, July 19	4:00 p.m. PDT	vs. Montreal Alouettes	W 41–5	2–2	TSN/RDS	BC Place	25,063	Recap
5	Fri, July 25	7:00 p.m. PDT	vs. Winnipeg Blue Bombers	L 6–23	2–3	TSN	BC Place	25,321	Recap
6	Fri, Aug 1	7:00 p.m. PDT	at Calgary Stampeders	W 25–24	3–3	TSN/ESPNews	McMahon Stadium	27,266	Recap
7	Fri, Aug 8	7:00 p.m. PDT	vs. Hamilton Tiger-Cats	W 36–29	4–3	TSN	BC Place	24,236	Recap
8	Sun, Aug 17	4:30 p.m. PDT	at Toronto Argonauts	W 33–17	5–3	TSN/RDS2	Rogers Centre	18,283	Recap
9	Sun, Aug 24	4:00 p.m. PDT	vs. Saskatchewan Roughriders	L 16–20	5–4	TSN/RDS2	BC Place	33,196	Recap
10	Bye								
11	Fri, Sept 5	4:30 p.m. PDT	at Ottawa Redblacks	W 7–5	6–4	TSN/RDS2	TD Place Stadium	24,287	Recap
12	Sat, Sept 13	7:00 p.m. PDT	vs. Winnipeg Blue Bombers	W 26–9	7–4	TSN	BC Place	27,754	Recap
13	Fri, Sept 19	7:00 p.m. PDT	vs. Toronto Argonauts	L 23–40	7–5	TSN	BC Place	27,038	Recap
14	Sat, Sept 27	6:30 p.m. PDT	at Calgary Stampeders	L 7–14	7–6	TSN/RDS2	McMahon Stadium	30,214	Recap
15	Sat, Oct 4	4:00 p.m. PDT	at Hamilton Tiger-Cats	L 17–19	7–7	TSN	Tim Hortons Field	20,125	Recap
16	Sat, Oct 11	7:00 p.m. PDT	vs. Ottawa Redblacks	W 41–3	8–7	TSN	BC Place	31,217	Recap
17	Bye								
18	Sat, Oct 25	4:00 p.m. PDT	at Winnipeg Blue Bombers	W 28–23	9–7	TSN	Investors Group Field	24,223	Recap
19	Sat, Nov 1	4:00 p.m. PDT	at Edmonton Eskimos	L 3–37	9–8	TSN/RDS2	Commonwealth Stadium	26,388	Recap
20	Fri, Nov 7	7:00 p.m. PST	vs. Calgary Stampeders	L 16–33	9–9	TSN	BC Place	33,752	Recap

# Games played with colour uniforms.
# Games played with white uniforms.
# Games played with alternate uniforms.

== Post-season ==
The Lions clinched their 18th straight playoff berth with a week 18 win over the Winnipeg Blue Bombers. Their final position in the standings, however, wasn't decided until the final game of the regular season when the Saskatchewan Roughriders clinched third place with a win over the Edmonton Eskimos, keeping the Lions in fourth place. Qualifying with the crossover rule, the Lions played in the CFL East Division playoffs for the fourth time in franchise history and the most of any western club in CFL history.

=== Schedule ===
Game	Date	Kickoff	Opponent	Results		TV	Venue	Attendance	Summary
Game	Date	Kickoff	Opponent	Score	Record	TV	Venue	Attendance	Summary
East Semi-Final	Sun, Nov 16	10:00 a.m. PST	at Montreal Alouettes	L 17–50	0–1	TSN/RDS	Molson Stadium	15,107	Recap

# Games played with white uniforms.

== Roster ==
2014 BC Lions final roster
Quarterbacks: 2 Kevin Glenn; 14 Travis Lulay; 19 Travis Partridge; Running backs: 24 Pascal Lochard; 10 Stefan Logan; 46 Rolly Lumbala; Receivers: 83 Stephen Adekolu; 84 Emmanuel Arceneaux; 85 Shawn Gore; 80 S. J. Haidara; 87 Marco Iannuzzi; 9 Ernest Jackson; 88 Kito Poblah	Offensive linemen: 50 Kirby Fabien G; 55 Jermarcus Hardrick G/T; 59 Matt Norman C; 63 Jovan Olafioye T; 69 Andre Ramsey T; 58 Cam Thorn G/C; 54 Dean Valli G; Defensive linemen: 53 Alex Bazzie DE; 78 David Ménard DE; 96 Khalif Mitchell DT; 94 Khreem Smith DE; 99 Jabar Westerman DT/DE; Special teams: 40 Mike Benson LS; 4 Paul McCallum K/P; 6 Ricky Schmitt P/K	Linebackers: 48 Akwasi Antwi; 45 Jason Arakgi; 44 Adam Bighill; 32 Casey Chin; 56 Solomon Elimimian; 28 Jamall Johnson; 8 Bo Lokombo; Defensive backs: 23 Josh Johnson; 27 J. R. LaRose; 17 T. J. Lee; 31 Dante Marsh; 20 Keynan Parker; 26 Cord Parks; 21 Ryan Phillips; 13 Torri Williams; 37 Ronnie Yell	Reserve roster: 7 Tim Brown RB; 79 Eric Taylor DT; Practice roster: 1 Keola Antolin RB; 29 Steven Clarke DB; 95 Marcus Dixon DT; 49 Steven Doege DE; 39 Richie Leone K/P; 90 Rob Lohr DT; 93 Chris Olson DE; 35 Bradley Randle RB; 18 Jordan Rodgers QB; 89 Whitman Tomusiak WR; 82 Lavasier Tuinei WR	Injured list: 12 John Beck QB; 16 Bryan Burnham SB; 33 Andrew Harris RB; 11 Alex Hoffman-Ellis LB; 62 Cody Husband G; 39 Jordan Matechuk LS; 3 Matt McGarva DB; 68 T-Dre Player G; 67 Hunter Steward T/G; 86 Courtney Taylor SB; Suspended list: 60 Stephon Heyer T; Italics indicate American players Roster updated 2026-04-29; Depth Chart • Transactions

== Coaching staff ==
2014 BC Lions staff
Front office: Owner – David Braley; President and ceo – Dennis Skulsky; General manager and vice president of football operations – Wally Buono; Director of player personnel – Roy Shivers; Player personnel coordinator and assistant to gm – Neil McEvoy; Head coaches: Head coach – Mike Benevides; Offensive coaches: Offensive coordinator and quarterbacks – Khari Jones; Running backs – Kelly Bates; Receivers – Joe Paopao; Offensive line – Dan Dorazio	Defensive coaches: Defensive coordinator – Mark Washington; Defensive line – Carl Hairston; Linebackers – Johnny Holland; Defensive backs – vacant; Special teams coaches: Special teams coordinator – Chuck McMann; Strength and conditioning: Strength and conditioning trainer – Chris Boyko; → Coaching staff
