= 2016 Calgary Stampeders season =

Canadian football team season

- Owner: Calgary Sports and Entertainment
- General manager: John Hufnagel
- President: John Hufnagel
- Head coach: Dave Dickenson
- Home stadium: McMahon Stadium

Results
- Record: 15–2–1
- Division place: 1st, West
- Playoffs: Lost Grey Cup
- Team MOP: Bo Levi Mitchell
- Team MOC: Jerome Messam
- Team MOR: DaVaris Daniels

Uniform

The 2016 Calgary Stampeders season was the 59th season for the team in the Canadian Football League (CFL) and their 82nd overall. The Stampeders finished in first place in the West Division and finished with a 15–2–1 record. The Stampeders qualified for the playoffs for the 12th straight year and advanced to the Grey Cup game where they lost to the Ottawa Redblacks. This season was Dave Dickenson's first year as head coach after John Hufnagel moved into a strict general manager role.

In the early morning hours of September 25, 2016, Stampeders defensive back Mylan Hicks was shot and killed at a Calgary nightclub. Fellow defensive back and teammate Jamar Wall changed his jersey number from 29 to no. 31 for the rest of the season in honour of Hicks. Each game played in week 15 across the league had a moment of silence in honour of Mylan Hicks. As a gesture to his memorial, the pistols that adorned the shoulders of the black alternate jersey were covered up.

With their week 16 win over the Toronto Argonauts, the Stampeders clinched first place in the West Division, a first-round bye in the 2016 playoffs, and hosted the 2016 West Final game. A win in that game over the BC Lions gave them a berth into the 104th Grey Cup. The Stampeders lost the Grey Cup game 39–33 to the Ottawa Redblacks in overtime.

== Preseason ==
Week	Date	Kickoff	Opponent	Results		TV	Venue	Attendance	Summary
Week	Date	Kickoff	Opponent	Score	Record	TV	Venue	Attendance	Summary
A	Sat, June 11	7:00 p.m. MDT	vs. Edmonton Eskimos	L 13–23	0–1	None	McMahon Stadium	28,367	Recap
B	Fri, June 17	8:00 p.m. MDT	at BC Lions	W 31–21	1–1	None	BC Place	17,630	Recap

== Regular season ==
=== Standings ===
West Division
Team	GP	W	L	T	Pts	PF	PA	Div	Stk	
Calgary Stampeders	18	15	2	1	31	586	369	9–1	L1	Details
BC Lions	18	12	6	0	24	545	454	5–5	W3	Details
Winnipeg Blue Bombers	18	11	7	0	22	497	454	5–5	W1	Details
Edmonton Eskimos	18	10	8	0	20	549	496	5–5	W2	Details
Saskatchewan Roughriders	18	5	13	0	10	350	530	1–9	L3	Details

=== Schedule ===
Week	Date	Kickoff	Opponent	Results		TV	Venue	Attendance	Summary
Week	Date	Kickoff	Opponent	Score	Record	TV	Venue	Attendance	Summary
1	Sat, June 25	8:00 p.m. MDT	at BC Lions	L 18–20	0–1	TSN/RDS/ESPN2	BC Place	21,386	Recap
2	Fri, July 1	8:00 p.m. MDT	vs. Winnipeg Blue Bombers	W 36–22	1–1	TSN/ESPN2	McMahon Stadium	26,815	Recap
3	Fri, July 8	5:00 p.m. MDT	at Ottawa Redblacks	T 26–26 (2OT)	1–1–1	TSN/RDS	TD Place Stadium	24,621	Recap
4	Bye								
5	Thurs, July 21	6:30 p.m. MDT	at Winnipeg Blue Bombers	W 33–18	2–1–1	TSN	Investors Group Field	24,677	Recap
6	Fri, July 29	8:00 p.m. MDT	vs. BC Lions	W 44–41 (OT)	3–1–1	TSN/RDS2/ESPN2	McMahon Stadium	27,651	Recap
7	Thurs, Aug 4	8:00 p.m. MDT	vs. Saskatchewan Roughriders	W 35–15	4–1–1	TSN/RDS2/ESPN2	McMahon Stadium	28,532	Recap
8	Sat, Aug 13	5:00 p.m. MDT	at Saskatchewan Roughriders	W 19–10	5–1–1	TSN	Mosaic Stadium	33,427	Recap
9	Fri, Aug 19	8:00 p.m. MDT	at BC Lions	W 37–9	6–1–1	TSN	BC Place	21,341	Recap
10	Sun, Aug 28	5:00 p.m. MDT	vs. Hamilton Tiger-Cats	W 30–24	7–1–1	TSN	McMahon Stadium	26,271	Recap
11	Mon, Sept 5	1:00 p.m. MDT	vs. Edmonton Eskimos	W 45–24	8–1–1	TSN	McMahon Stadium	31,440	Recap
12	Sat, Sept 10	5:00 p.m. MDT	at Edmonton Eskimos	W 34–28 (2OT)	9–1–1	TSN	Commonwealth Stadium	35,278	Recap
13	Sat, Sept 17	3:00 p.m. MDT	vs. Ottawa Redblacks	W 48–23	10–1–1	TSN	McMahon Stadium	26,529	Recap
14	Sat, Sept 24	2:00 p.m. MDT	vs. Winnipeg Blue Bombers	W 36–34	11–1–1	TSN/RDS2	McMahon Stadium	27,159	Recap
15	Sat, Oct 1	2:00 p.m. MDT	at Hamilton Tiger-Cats	W 36–17	12–1–1	TSN	Tim Hortons Field	23,741	Recap
16	Mon, Oct 10	2:00 p.m. MDT	at Toronto Argonauts	W 48–20	13–1–1	TSN	BMO Field	14,224	Recap
17	Sat, Oct 15	5:00 p.m. MDT	vs. Montreal Alouettes	W 22–8	14–1–1	TSN/RDS	McMahon Stadium	25,351	Recap
18	Fri, Oct 21	8:00 p.m. MDT	vs. Toronto Argonauts	W 31–13	15–1–1	TSN	McMahon Stadium	27,520	Recap
19	Sun, Oct 30	11:00 a.m. MDT	at Montreal Alouettes	L 8–17	15–2–1	TSN/RDS	Molson Stadium	20,562	Recap
20	Bye								

== Postseason ==
=== Schedule ===
Game	Date	Kickoff	Opponent	Results		TV	Venue	Attendance	Summary
Game	Date	Kickoff	Opponent	Score	Record	TV	Venue	Attendance	Summary
West Semi-Final	Bye								
West Final	Sun, Nov 20	2:30 p.m. MST	vs. BC Lions	W 42–15	1–0	TSN/RDS/ESPN2	McMahon Stadium	32,115	Recap
104th Grey Cup	Sun, Nov 27	4:00 p.m. MST	at Ottawa Redblacks	L 33–39 (OT)	1–1	TSN/RDS/ESPN2	BMO Field	33,421	Recap

== Roster ==
2016 Calgary Stampeders final roster
Quarterbacks: 15 Andrew Buckley; 19 Bo Levi Mitchell; 4 Drew Tate; Running backs: 26 Rob Cote; 14 Roy Finch; 23 William Langlais; 33 Jerome Messam; 46 Charlie Power; Receivers: 83 Juwan Brescacin; 87 Simon Charbonneau-Campeau; 89 DaVaris Daniels; 1 Lemar Durant; 81 Bakari Grant; 88 Kamar Jorden; 16 Marquay McDaniel; 86 Anthony Parker	Offensive linemen: 60 Shane Bergman G; 64 Derek Dennis T/G; 65 Dan Federkeil T; 59 Randy Richards T; 61 Ucambre Williams T; 50 Spencer Wilson G/C/T; Defensive linemen: 94 Frank Beltre DE; 95 Ja'Gared Davis DE; 39 Charleston Hughes DE; 93 Micah Johnson DT; 41 Cordarro Law DE; 90 Quinn Smith DT; 7 Junior Turner DT; 97 Derek Wiggan DT	Linebackers: 40 Dexter Janke; 51 Maleki Harris; 36 Glenn Love; 49 Alex Singleton; Defensive backs: 11 Josh Bell; 21 Adam Berger; 20 Matt Bucknor; 24 Joe Burnett; 25 Tommie Campbell; 0 Ciante Evans; 28 Brandon Smith; 2 Adam Thibault; 31 Jamar Wall	Special teams: 54 Pierre-Luc Caron LS; 6 Rob Maver P; 30 René Paredes K; Practice roster: 82 Jarrett Boykin WR; 17 Jarrett Bush DB; 43 Max Caron LB; 56 Ruben Carter C; 12 Paris Cotton RB; 73 Josh Francis LB; 91 Bryson Kelly DT; 80 Jamal Nixon SB; 27 Chris Rwabukamba DB; 67 Mitchell Van Dyk G/T	Injured list: 98 Brandon Boudreaux DE; 44 Ben D'Aguilar DE; 53 Brad Erdos G; 68 Roman Grozman C/G; 34 Tory Harrison RB; 63 Pierre Lavertu C; 57 Karl Lavoie G; 42 Deron Mayo LB; 96 Zach Minter DT; 32 Osagie Odiase DB; 35 Shaquille Richardson DB; 58 Cameron Thorn C/G; 85 Joe West WR; 84 Greg Wilson WR; Italics indicate International player Roster updated 2026-05-19; Depth Chart • Transactions
