= 2014 Edmonton Eskimos season =

Canadian football team season

- General manager: Ed Hervey
- Head coach: Chris Jones
- Home stadium: Commonwealth Stadium

Results
- Record: 12–6
- Division place: 2nd, West
- Playoffs: Lost West Final
- Team MOP: Adarius Bowman, WR
- Team MOC: Eddie Steele, DT
- Team MOR: Dexter McCoil, LB

Uniform

The 2014 Edmonton Eskimos season was the 57th season for the team in the Canadian Football League (CFL) and their 66th overall. The Eskimos successfully improved upon their 4–14 record from 2013 after earning their fifth win in their sixth game. The Eskimos qualified for the playoffs and won the West Semi-Final over the Saskatchewan Roughriders, hosting their first playoff game since 2011. However, their season came to a close after they lost the West Final to the Calgary Stampeders, who defeated the Eskimos in all four meetings this season.

== Offseason ==
=== CFL draft ===
The 2014 CFL draft took place on May 13, 2014.

| Round | Pick | Player | Position | School/Club team |
|---|---|---|---|---|
| 1 | 6 | Devon Bailey | WR | St. Francis Xavier |
| 2 | 15 | Aaron Milton | RB | Toronto |
| 4 | 30 | Raye Hartmann | DB | St. Francis Xavier |
| 6 | 48 | Zackary Medeiros | P/K | Montreal |
| 7 | 57 | Michael Dadzie | DL | Regina |

=== Notable transactions ===
| Date | Type | Incoming | Outgoing | Team |
|---|---|---|---|---|
| May 13, 2014 | Trade | Tony Washington (OL); Otha Foster (DB); Negotiation list player 1st round pick in 2014 CFL draft - Devon Bailey (WR); 2nd round pick in 2014 CFL draft - Aaron Milton (RB) | Negotiation list player 1st round pick in 2014 CFL draft - Anthony Coombs (RB); 3rd round pick in 2014 CFL draft - Jaskaran Dhillon (DL) | Toronto Argonauts |
| September 2, 2014 | Trade | Steve Myddelton (OL) | 6th round pick in 2015 CFL draft - Everett Ellefsen (DL); *4th round pick in 2016 CFL draft - David Onyemata (DL) | Hamilton Tiger-Cats |

*Later traded to the Saskatchewan Roughriders

== Preseason ==
| Week | Date | Kickoff | Opponent | Results | | TV | Venue | Attendance | Summary |
| Week | Date | Kickoff | Opponent | Score | Record | TV | Venue | Attendance | Summary |
|---|---|---|---|---|---|---|---|---|---|
| A | Bye | | | | | | | | |
| B | Fri, June 13 | 7:00 p.m. MDT | vs. BC Lions | L 11–14 | 0–1 | TSN | Commonwealth Stadium | 25,963 | Recap |
| C | Fri, June 20 | 7:00 p.m. MDT | at Saskatchewan Roughriders | W 19–14 | 1–1 | None | Mosaic Stadium | 15,353 | Recap |

== Regular season ==
=== Season standings ===
West Division
| Team | GP | W | L | T | PF | PA | Pts | |
|---|---|---|---|---|---|---|---|---|
| Calgary Stampeders | 18 | 15 | 3 | 0 | 511 | 347 | 30 | Details |
| Edmonton Eskimos | 18 | 12 | 6 | 0 | 492 | 340 | 24 | Details |
| Saskatchewan Roughriders | 18 | 10 | 8 | 0 | 399 | 441 | 20 | Details |
| BC Lions | 18 | 9 | 9 | 0 | 380 | 365 | 18 | Details |
| Winnipeg Blue Bombers | 18 | 7 | 11 | 0 | 397 | 481 | 14 | Details |

=== Season schedule ===
| Week | Date | Kickoff | Opponent | Results | | | TV | Venue | Attendance | Summary |
| Week | Date | Kickoff | Opponent | Score | Record | Stk | TV | Venue | Attendance | Summary |
|---|---|---|---|---|---|---|---|---|---|---|
| 1 | Sat, June 28 | 4:00 p.m. MDT | at BC Lions | W 27–20 | 1–0 | W1 | TSN/RDS2 | BC Place | 24,524 | Recap |
| 2 | Fri, July 4 | 8:00 p.m. MDT | vs. Hamilton Tiger-Cats | W 28–24 | 2–0 | W2 | TSN | Commonwealth Stadium | 30,714 | Recap |
| 3 | Fri, July 11 | 8:00 p.m. MDT | vs. Ottawa Redblacks | W 27–11 | 3–0 | W3 | TSN/RDS/ESPN2 | Commonwealth Stadium | 31,521 | Recap |
| 4 | Thur, July 17 | 6:30 p.m. MDT | at Winnipeg Blue Bombers | W 26–3 | 4–0 | W4 | TSN/RDS2/ESPN2 | Investors Group Field | 30,976 | Recap |
| 5 | Thur, July 24 | 7:00 p.m. MDT | vs. Calgary Stampeders | L 22–26 | 4–1 | L1 | TSN/ESPN2 | Commonwealth Stadium | 40,066 | Recap |
| 6 | Bye | | | | | | | | | |
| 7 | Fri, Aug 8 | 5:00 p.m. MDT | at Montreal Alouettes | W 33–23 | 5–1 | W1 | TSN/RDS | Molson Stadium | 20,054 | Recap |
| 8 | Fri, Aug 15 | 5:30 p.m. MDT | at Ottawa Redblacks | W 10–8 | 6–1 | W2 | TSN/RDS2 | TD Place Stadium | 24,291 | Recap |
| 9 | Sat, Aug 23 | 2:00 p.m. MDT | vs. Toronto Argonauts | W 41–27 | 7–1 | W3 | TSN | Commonwealth Stadium | 33,767 | Recap |
| 10 | Mon, Sept 1 | 2:30 p.m. MDT | at Calgary Stampeders | L 13–28 | 7–2 | L1 | TSN | McMahon Stadium | 35,400 | Recap |
| 11 | Sat, Sept 6 | 5:00 p.m. MDT | vs. Calgary Stampeders | L 34–41 | 7–3 | L2 | TSN/RDS2 | Commonwealth Stadium | 40,852 | Recap |
| 12 | Fri, Sept 12 | 7:00 p.m. MDT | vs. Montreal Alouettes | W 33–16 | 8–3 | W1 | TSN/RDS | Commonwealth Stadium | 27,833 | Recap |
| 13 | Sat, Sept 20 | 5:00 p.m. MDT | at Hamilton Tiger-Cats | L 23–25 | 8–4 | L1 | TSN | Tim Hortons Field | 18,135 | Recap |
| 14 | Fri, Sept 26 | 8:00 p.m. MDT | vs. Saskatchewan Roughriders | W 24–0 | 9–4 | W1 | TSN | Commonwealth Stadium | 42,161 | Recap |
| 15 | Sat, Oct 4 | 2:00 p.m. MDT | at Toronto Argonauts | L 32–33 | 9–5 | L1 | TSN | Rogers Centre | 16,276 | Recap |
| 16 | Mon, Oct 13 | 2:30 p.m. MDT | vs. Winnipeg Blue Bombers | W 41–9 | 10–5 | W1 | TSN/RDS2 | Commonwealth Stadium | 28,065 | Recap |
| 17 | Sun, Oct 19 | 2:00 p.m. MDT | at Saskatchewan Roughriders | W 24–19 | 11–5 | W2 | TSN/ESPN2 | Mosaic Stadium | 32,421 | Recap |
| 18 | Bye | | | | | | | | | |
| 19 | Sat, Nov 1 | 5:00 p.m. MDT | vs. BC Lions | W 37–3 | 12–5 | W3 | TSN/RDS2 | Commonwealth Stadium | 26,388 | Recap |
| 20 | Sat, Nov 8 | 5:00 p.m. MST | at Saskatchewan Roughriders | L 17–24 | 12–6 | L1 | TSN/RDS2 | Mosaic Stadium | 20,139 | Recap |

Total attendance: 301,367
Average attendance: 33,485 (59.5%)

== Postseason ==
=== Schedule ===
| Game | Date | Kickoff | Opponent | Results | | TV | Venue | Attendance | Summary |
| Game | Date | Kickoff | Opponent | Score | Record | TV | Venue | Attendance | Summary |
|---|---|---|---|---|---|---|---|---|---|
| West Semi-Final | Sun, Nov 16 | 2:30 p.m. MST | vs. Saskatchewan Roughriders | W 18–10 | 1–0 | TSN/RDS2/ESPN2 | Commonwealth Stadium | 26,237 | Recap |
| West Final | Sun, Nov 23 | 2:30 p.m. MST | at Calgary Stampeders | L 18–43 | 1–1 | TSN | McMahon Stadium | 31,004 | Recap |

== Roster ==
| 2014 Edmonton Eskimos final roster |
|---|---|---|---|---|
| Quarterbacks: 12 Justin Goltz; 16 Matt Nichols; 13 Mike Reilly; 5 Pat White; Running backs: 32 Kendial Lawrence; 31 Calvin McCarty; 30 John White; Receivers: 81 Devon Bailey; 73 Anthony Barrett; 4 Adarius Bowman; 85 Nate Coehoorn; 88 Akeem Foster; 19 Paris Jackson; 2 Fred Stamps | Offensive linemen: 67 D'Anthony Batiste T; 64 Andrew Jones G; 66 Matt O'Donnell G; 63 Brian Ramsay C; 60 Justin Sorensen C; 58 Tony Washington T; Defensive linemen: 95 Gregory Alexandre DT; 99 Willie Jefferson DE; 92 Cedric McKinley DT; 90 Almondo Sewell DT; 97 Eddie Steele DT; 41 Odell Willis DE | Linebackers: 35 Rennie Curran; 27 Mike Dubuisson; 46 Nathan Kanya; 40 Deon Lacey; 45 Dexter McCoil; 25 Mike Miller; 247 J. C. Sherritt; Defensive backs: 22 Joe Burnett; 37 Otha Foster; 36 Aaron Grymes; 34 Ryan Hinds; 6 Alonzo Lawrence; 8 Cauchy Muamba; 15 Chris Rwabukamba; 39 Corbin Sharun; 8 Pat Watkins; 23 Marcell Young | Special teams: 53 Ryan King LS; 18 Hugh O'Neill K/P; Reserve roster: 10 Luca Congi K/P; Practice roster: 20 Raye Hartmann DB; 72 Leon Mackey DE; 62 Christopher Mercer T; 3 Jamal Miles SB; 96 Daniel Ross DT; 83 Marcus Rucker WR; 14 Matt Scott QB; 24 Tyler Thomas RB; 84 Isaiah Williams WR | Injured list: 48 Bo Adebayo DE; 69 Adam Baboulas T; 77 Mathieu Boulay DE; 54 Selvish Capers T/G; 17 Shamawd Chambers WR; 68 Thaddeus Coleman T; 7 Noel Devine RB; 33 Curtis Dublanko LB; 44 Joash Gesse LB; 82 A. J. Guyton SB; 91 Marcus Howard DE; 28 Aaron Milton FB; 59 Steve Myddelton G; 55 Elie Ngoyi DE; 93 Don Oramasionwu DT; 87 Patrick Robertson WR; 65 Simeon Rottier G; 38 Eric Samuels DB; 29 Robert Sands DB; 11 Grant Shaw K/P; 94 Cameron Sheffield DE; Italics indicate International player |
