= 2014 CFL draft =

Canadian football draft

2014 CFL Draft

General information
- Sport: Canadian football
- Date: May 13
- Time: 7:00 PM EDT
- Location: Toronto
- Network: TSN

Overview
- 65 total selections in 7 rounds
- First selection: Pierre Lavertu
- Most selections: Ottawa Redblacks (9); Calgary Stampeders (9)
- Fewest selections: Edmonton Eskimos (5); Winnipeg Blue Bombers (5)
- CIS selections: 59
- NCAA selections: 6

The 2014 CFL draft took place on Tuesday, May 13, 2014 at 7:00 PM ET on TSN. 65 players were chosen from among eligible players from Canadian Universities across the country, as well as Canadian players playing in the NCAA. A total of 19 trades were made involving draft picks from this year, including six made on draft day itself, with five involving picks from the first round.

The Ottawa Redblacks were scheduled to pick first in each round of the 2013 CFL draft, and were supposed to have two bonus picks at the end of the draft. Due to stadium delays, Ottawa will join the Canadian Football League in 2014, and those stipulations will be applied to this year's draft instead. After the CFL announced that drafts would be expanding to seven rounds, it was stated that this draft would have 63 selections, implying that Ottawa would no longer receive the two bonus picks at the end of the draft. However, after the 2014 draft order was released on February 23, 2014, it was revealed that Ottawa would, indeed, receive two selections at the end of the draft, increasing the total number of draftable players to 65.

Beginning with the 2014 draft, non-import CIS players will be eligible to be selected in the draft three years after completing their first season of eligibility. This eliminates any rookies who sat out or redshirted for their first playing year and would be eligible to return to university. Prior to this change, players were eligible to be selected after their fourth year of post-secondary education. Additionally, for non-import players playing in the NCAA or NAIA, they are now eligible to be selected after completing their senior year. This change eliminates the possibility of NCAA or NAIA students returning to college after being drafted. This change had a significant impact as it was the highest percentage of CIS/CIAU players drafted (90.8%) since 1972 when only Canadian institutions were included in the draft. Additionally, the 59 CIS players drafted was the most since the 1978 CFL draft when 74 of 90 players drafted came from CIS programs. Finally, only one drafted player, Tchissakid Player, was from a U.S. school (Northwestern State). The other five non-CIS draftees were all from Simon Fraser, the only NCAA member in Canada.

The first round was broadcast live on TSN with CFL Commissioner Mark Cohon announcing the first selection. The production was hosted by Rod Black and featured the CFL on TSN panel which included Duane Forde, Chris Schultz, Paul LaPolice, Farhan Lalji, and Lee Barrette who analyzed the teams' needs and picks. However, the broadcast was not without controversy as viewers initially needed to be subscribed to Bell Satellite TV or Rogers TV in order to view online. TSN later recognized the mistake and made the draft viewable to everyone online.

== Top prospects ==
Source: CFL Scouting Bureau rankings.

Final Ranking	January Ranking	September Ranking	Player	Position	School
1	1	1	Laurent Duvernay-Tardif	Offensive lineman	McGill
2	3	3	David Foucault	Offensive lineman	Montreal
3	2	4	Pierre Lavertu	Offensive lineman	Laval
4	-	-	Quinn Smith	Defensive lineman	Concordia
5	4	2	Devon Bailey	Wide receiver	St. Francis Xavier
6	6	-	Evan Gill	Defensive lineman	Manitoba
7	15	-	Dylan Ainsworth	Defensive lineman	Western
8	9	-	Anthony Coombs	Running back	Manitoba
9	5	15	Matthias Goossen	Offensive lineman	Simon Fraser
10	8	8	Andrew Lue	Linebacker	Queen's
11	13	5	Adam Thibault	Defensive back	Laval
12	11	12	Casey Chin	Linebacker	Simon Fraser
13	-	-	David Ménard	Defensive lineman	Montreal
14	-	-	Antoine Pruneau	Defensive back	Montreal
15	7	6	Beau Landry	Linebacker	Western
-	10	7	Max Caron	Linebacker	Concordia
-	12	9	Sam Sabourin	Linebacker	Queen's
-	14	10	Derek Wiggan	Defensive lineman	Queen's
-	-	11	Kris Bastien	Wide receiver	Concordia
-	-	13	Kit Hillis	Wide receiver	Saskatchewan
-	-	14	Josh Burns	Defensive back	Windsor

== Trades ==
In the explanations below, (D) denotes trades that took place during the draft, while (PD) indicates trades completed pre-draft.

=== Round one ===
- Hamilton → Saskatchewan (PD). Hamilton traded this selection, Shomari Williams, and Josh Bartel to Saskatchewan for the ninth and eleventh picks in this year's draft.
- Saskatchewan → Hamilton (PD). Saskatchewan traded this selection and the eleventh pick in this year's draft to Hamilton for Shomari Williams, Josh Bartel, and the eighth pick in this year's draft.
- Ottawa → Calgary (PD). Ottawa traded the first overall selection and the playing rights to Marwan Hage to Calgary for Jon Gott.
- Edmonton → Toronto (D). Edmonton traded this selection and the 21st overall selection to Toronto for the sixth overall selection, the 15th overall selection, Tony Washington, and Otha Foster.
- Toronto → Edmonton (D). Toronto traded this selection, the 15th overall selection, Tony Washington, and Otha Foster to Edmonton for the third overall selection and the 21st overall selection.
- BC → Ottawa (D). BC traded this selection to Ottawa for Kevin Glenn.
- Montreal → Ottawa (D). Montreal traded this selection and the 13th overall selection to Ottawa for the fifth overall selection and the 10th overall selection.
- Ottawa → Montreal (D). Ottawa traded this selection and the 10th overall selection to Montreal for the fourth overall selection and the 13th overall selection.
- Saskatchewan → Hamilton (D). Saskatchewan traded this selection to Hamilton for the 11th overall selection and the 17th overall selection.

=== Round two ===
- Edmonton → BC (PD). Edmonton traded this selection and a second round pick in the 2013 CFL draft to BC for Mike Reilly and a second round pick in the 2013 CFL draft.
- Winnipeg → Saskatchewan (PD). Winnipeg traded this selection and Alex Hall to Saskatchewan for Patrick Neufeld and a fourth-round pick in the 2015 CFL draft.
- Saskatchewan → Hamilton (PD). Saskatchewan traded this selection and the ninth pick in this year's draft to Hamilton for Shomari Williams, Josh Bartel, and the eighth pick in this year's draft.
- Toronto → Edmonton (D). Toronto traded this selection, the sixth overall selection, Tony Washington, and Otha Foster to Edmonton for the third overall selection and the 21st overall selection.
- Ottawa → Montreal (D). Ottawa traded this selection and the fifth overall selection to Montreal for the fourth overall selection and the 13th overall selection.
- Montreal → Ottawa (D). Montreal traded this selection and the fourth overall selection to Ottawa for the fifth overall selection and the 10th overall selection.
- Hamilton → Saskatchewan (D). Hamilton traded two second round selections to Saskatchewan for the eighth overall selection.
- Saskatchewan → Winnipeg (D). Saskatchewan traded this selection to Winnipeg for the 20th overall selection and the 26th overall selection.

=== Round three ===
- Hamilton → Calgary (PD). Hamilton traded this selection to Calgary for a sixth-round pick in this year's draft and Geoff Tisdale.
- Saskatchewan → BC (PD). Saskatchewan traded this selection and Justin Harper to BC for Geroy Simon.
- BC → Calgary (PD). BC traded this selection to Calgary for Steve Myddelton.
- Toronto → Winnipeg (PD). Toronto traded this selection and Marc Parenteau to Winnipeg for Anthony Woodson and a fifth-round pick in this year's draft.
- Winnipeg → Calgary (PD). Winnipeg traded this selection to Calgary for Chris Randle and the 26th pick in this year's draft.
- Calgary → Winnipeg (PD). Calgary traded this selection and Chris Randle to Winnipeg for the 24th pick in this year's draft.
- Ottawa → Calgary (PD). Ottawa traded this selection and a third-round pick in the 2015 CFL draft to Calgary for Justin Phillips and a third-round selection in this year's draft.
- Calgary → Ottawa (PD). Calgary traded this selection and Justin Phillips to Ottawa for a third-round selection in this year's draft and a third-round pick in the 2015 CFL draft.
- Edmonton → Toronto (D). Edmonton traded this selection and the third overall selection to Toronto for the sixth overall selection, the 15th overall selection, Tony Washington, and Otha Foster.
- Winnipeg → Saskatchewan (D). Winnipeg traded two third-round selections to Saskatchewan for the 17th overall selection.

=== Round four ===
- Hamilton → Montreal (PD). Hamilton traded this selection to Montreal for Dahrran Diedrick.
- Saskatchewan → Toronto (PD). Saskatchewan traded a conditional draft pick to Toronto for Chris Patrick. This pick was originally a conditional pick that became a fourth-round pick.

=== Round five ===
- Winnipeg → Toronto (PD). Winnipeg traded this selection and Anthony Woodson to Toronto for Marc Parenteau and a third-round pick in this year's draft.
- Edmonton → Saskatchewan (PD). Edmonton traded a conditional draft pick to Saskatchewan for Hugh Charles. This pick was originally a conditional pick that became a fifth-round pick.
- Calgary → Montreal (PD). Calgary traded this selection and Larry Taylor to Montreal for the 40th pick in this year's draft. The trade includes conditional picks in the 2015 CFL draft.
- Montreal → Calgary (PD). Montreal traded this selection to Calgary for Larry Taylor and the 43rd pick in this year's draft. The trade includes conditional picks in the 2015 CFL draft.

=== Round six ===
- Calgary → Hamilton (PD). Calgary traded this selection and Geoff Tisdale to Hamilton for a third-round pick in this year's draft.

== Draft order ==
= CFL Division All-Star	= CFL All-Star	= Hall of Famer

=== Round one ===
Pick #	CFL team	Player	Position	School
1	Calgary Stampeders (via Ottawa)	Pierre Lavertu	OL	Laval
2	Winnipeg Blue Bombers	Matthias Goossen	OL	Simon Fraser
3	Toronto Argonauts (via Edmonton)	Anthony Coombs	RB	Manitoba
4	Ottawa Redblacks (via Montreal)	Antoine Pruneau	DB	Montreal
5	Montreal Alouettes (via Ottawa via BC)	David Foucault	OL	Montreal
6	Edmonton Eskimos (via Toronto)	Devon Bailey	WR	St. Francis Xavier
7	Calgary Stampeders	Quinn Smith	DL	Concordia
8	Hamilton Tiger-Cats (via Saskatchewan via Hamilton)	Beau Landry	LB	Western Ontario
9	Hamilton Tiger-Cats (via Saskatchewan)	Evan Gill	DL	Manitoba

=== Round two ===
Pick #	CFL team	Player	Position	School
10	Montreal Alouettes (via Ottawa)	Andrew Lue	DB	Queen's
11	Saskatchewan Roughriders (via Hamilton via Saskatchewan via Winnipeg)	Dylan Ainsworth	DL	Western Ontario
12	BC Lions (via Edmonton)	Tchissakid Player	OL	Northwestern State
13	Ottawa Redblacks (via Montreal)	Scott MacDonell	WR	Queen's
14	BC Lions	Pascal Lochard	FB	Laval
15	Edmonton Eskimos (via Toronto)	Aaron Milton	RB	Toronto
16	Calgary Stampeders	Max Caron	LB	Concordia
17	Winnipeg Blue Bombers (via Saskatchewan via Hamilton)	Jesse Briggs	LB	McGill
18	Saskatchewan Roughriders	Alex Pierzchalski	WR	Toronto

=== Round three ===
Pick #	CFL team	Player	Position	School
19	Calgary Stampeders (via Ottawa)	Laurent Duvernay-Tardif	OL	McGill
20	Saskatchewan Roughriders (via Winnipeg)	Johnny Mark	K	Calgary
21	Toronto Argonauts (via Edmonton)	Jaskaran Dhillon	OL	British Columbia
22	Montreal Alouettes	Jeffrey Finley	DL	Guelph
23	Ottawa Redblacks (via Calgary via BC)	Nigel Romick	DL	Saint Mary's
24	Calgary Stampeders (via Winnipeg via Toronto)	Adam Thibault	DB	Laval
25	Calgary Stampeders	Joe Circelli	OL	Western Ontario
26	Saskatchewan Roughriders (via Winnipeg via Calgary via Hamilton)	Kristopher Bastien	WR	Concordia
27	BC Lions (via Saskatchewan)	Casey Chin	LB	Simon Fraser

=== Round four ===
Pick #	CFL team	Player	Position	School
28	Ottawa Redblacks	Aaron Wheaton	OL	Toronto
29	Winnipeg Blue Bombers	Derek Jones	DB	Simon Fraser
30	Edmonton Eskimos	Raye Hartmann	DB	St. Francis Xavier
31	Montreal Alouettes	James Tuck	DL	York
32	BC Lions	David Menard	DL	Montreal
33	Toronto Argonauts	Thomas Miles	LB	Manitoba
34	Calgary Stampeders	Derek Wiggan	DL	Queen's
35	Montreal Alouettes (via Hamilton)	Andrew Smith	WR	Manitoba
36	Toronto Argonauts (via Saskatchewan)	Alexandre Dupuis	FB	Montreal

=== Round five ===
Pick #	CFL team	Player	Position	School
37	Ottawa Redblacks	Hugo Desmarais	OL	Laval
38	Toronto Argonauts (via Winnipeg)	Eric Black	DB	Saint Mary's
39	Saskatchewan Roughriders (via Edmonton)	Matt Webster	DB	Queen's
40	Calgary Stampeders (via Montreal)	Tyler Crapigna	K	McMaster
41	BC Lions	Alexander Fox	WR	Bishop's
42	Toronto Argonauts	Evan Pszczonak	WR	Windsor
43	Montreal Alouettes (via Calgary)	Nick Boyd	K/P	Manitoba
44	Hamilton Tiger-Cats	Christopher Johnson	LB	Toronto
45	Saskatchewan Roughriders	Kyle Paterson	OL	Regina

=== Round six ===
Pick #	CFL team	Player	Position	School
46	Ottawa Redblacks	Stephon Miller	DL	Windsor
47	Winnipeg Blue Bombers	Quinn Everett	DL	Mount Allison
48	Edmonton Eskimos	Zach Medeiros	K/P	Montreal
49	Montreal Alouettes	Jean-Christophe Beaulieu	FB	Sherbrooke
50	BC Lions	Dylan Roper	DL	Simon Fraser
51	Toronto Argonauts	Tore Corrado	WR	Simon Fraser
52	Hamilton Tiger-Cats (via Calgary)	Mathieu Girard	DL	Montreal
53	Hamilton Tiger-Cats	Stephen Mawa	DL	British Columbia
54	Saskatchewan Roughriders	Travis Bent	LB	Concordia

=== Round seven ===
Pick #	CFL team	Player	Position	School
55	Ottawa Redblacks	Vincent Desloges	DL	Laval
56	Winnipeg Blue Bombers	Aram Eisho	LB	McMaster
57	Edmonton Eskimos	Michael Dadzie	DL	Regina
58	Montreal Alouettes	Mackenzie Sarro	WR/FB	Calgary
59	BC Lions	Guillaume Bourassa	RB	Laval
60	Toronto Argonauts	Kirby Fletcher	DL	Acadia
61	Calgary Stampeders	Brian Marshall	WR	Western Ontario
62	Hamilton Tiger-Cats	Martin Pesek	DL	Acadia
63	Saskatchewan Roughriders	Terry Hart	OL	St. Francis Xavier
64	Ottawa Redblacks	Alexandre Bernard	LB	McGill
65	Ottawa Redblacks	Kevin Malcolm	LS	McMaster
