= Johnny Mark =

Canadian football player (born 1992)

No. 33
- Position: Kicker

Personal information
- Born: June 1, 1992 (age 34); Peterborough, Ontario, Canada
- Listed height: 6 ft 0 in (1.83 m)
- Listed weight: 185 lb (84 kg)

Career information
- University: Calgary
- CFL draft: 2014: 3rdth round, 20thth overall pick

Career history
- 2014: Saskatchewan Roughriders*
- 2015: Ottawa Redblacks*
- 2016: Saskatchewan Roughriders
- * Offseason or practice squad member only

Awards and highlights
- CIS records: Points, career (535); Field goals, career (91); Field goals, season (26)
- Stats at CFL.ca

Johnny Mark (born June 1, 1992) is a Canadian former professional football kicker who played for the Saskatchewan Roughriders of the Canadian Football League (CFL) in 2016. He also played for the Calgary Dinos in U Sports (CIS) from 2011 to 2015. He concluded his university career holding multiple U Sports records, including most points in a career (535), most field goals in a career (91) and most field goals in a season (26) and is a four-time All-Canadian. He was drafted in the third round, 20th overall by the Saskatchewan Roughriders in the 2014 CFL draft.

Following the 2014 CFL draft, Mark signed with the Roughriders. After playing in two preseason games, he returned to the Dinos for the 2014 CIS season. Following the season he was traded to the Ottawa Redblacks, before being released on June 20, 2015, and returning for his final season at the University of Calgary in 2015. Mark was re-signed by the Roughriders on August 2, 2016, and played Week 7 against the Calgary Stampeders.
