= Jesse Newman =

Canadian football player (born 1982)

No. 62, 53
- Position: Guard

Personal information
- Born: September 23, 1982 (age 44); Vancouver, British Columbia, Canada
- Listed height: 6 ft 4 in (1.93 m)
- Listed weight: 302 lb (137 kg)

Career information
- High school: Tsawwassen (BC) South Delta
- College: Louisiana–Lafayette
- CFL draft: 2008: 1st round, 3rd overall pick

Career history
- Calgary Stampeders (2008–2009); BC Lions (2010–2012)

Awards and highlights
- 2× Grey Cup champion (2008, 2011); First-team All-Sun Belt (2007); Second-team All-Sun Belt (2005)
- Stats at CFL.ca (archive)

Jesse Newman (born September 23, 1982) is a Canadian former professional football guard for the Calgary Stampeders and BC Lions of the Canadian Football League (CFL). He was drafted in the first round with the 3rd overall pick in the 2008 CFL draft by the Calgary Stampeders. He played college football for UL Lafayette. He retired from professional football on June 4, 2010, for personal reasons. Following Calgary's bye week later that season, Newman announced that he was coming out of retirement, much to the chagrin of some of the team's players. Consequently, Newman was traded to the BC Lions on September 4 for a second-round pick in the 2011 CFL draft as well as a conditional fourth-round pick in the 2012 CFL draft.
