= Evan Gill =

Canadian football player (born 1992)

No. 92
- Position: Defensive lineman

Personal information
- Born: August 19, 1992 (age 34); Winnipeg, Manitoba, Canada
- Listed height: 6 ft 4 in (1.93 m)
- Listed weight: 292 lb (132 kg)

Career information
- High school: Churchill High School
- University: Manitoba
- CFL draft: 2014: 1st round, 9th overall pick

Career history
- 2015: New York Giants*
- 2015–2017: Hamilton Tiger-Cats
- 2018: Toronto Argonauts*
- 2018: Edmonton Eskimos
- 2018: Ottawa Redblacks*
- * Offseason or practice squad member only
- Stats at CFL.ca

Evan Gill (born August 19, 1992) is a Canadian former professional football defensive lineman who played in the Canadian Football League (CFL). He played CIS football at the University of Manitoba.

== Early life and education ==
Gill is a graduate of Churchill High School in Winnipeg, Manitoba. He was a multi-sport athlete and provincial champion in four different sports.

== College career ==
In 2010, Gill redshirted as a true freshman.

In 2011, he started at defensive end playing all 8 regular season games recording 32.5 Tackles, 3.5 sacks, and 6.5 tackles for loss. Following the 2011 season, he was selected to represent Canada at the IFAF 2012 International Bowl. The game featured the top 50 under 19 Americans on Team USA. Gill played with the IFAF World Team which was made up of 50 players from 22 countries outside of the United States. He recorded 5 tackles, 2 sacks and a fumble recovery as the team's top defensive performer while the World Team upset Team USA 35-29. Team USA featured standouts such as Quarterback Jameis Winston, Running Back Todd Gurley, and Linebacker Noor Davis.

In 2012, he moved from defensive end to defensive tackle, and recorded 23 tackles, and 3 tackles for a loss in 8 regular season games.

In 2013, at defensive tackle, he recorded 29.5 tackles, 4 sacks, 8 tackles for a loss. Playing in all 8 regular season games, the Bisons also hosted the Canada West semifinal which featured the University of Saskatchewan Huskies. The Bisons won 37-36 on a failed field goal attempt, then advanced to the Hardy Cup final where they were defeated by the University of Calgary Dinos.

In 2014, he played in two games. His season ended after suffering an Anterior Cruciate Ligament tear.

== Professional career ==
=== Pre-draft ===
Following the 2013 season, selected as one of two Canadians to participate in the 2014 East–West Shrine Game. The game was televised globally on the NFL Network. The game is played by many top NCAA college football players who are entering the NFL draft. All 32 teams attend the week of practice, interviewing numerous players and interacting with them. Gill became the third player from the University of Manitoba to attend. Previous players include Jason Rahaus and former NFL player Israel Idonije.

=== Hamilton Tiger-Cats ===
Gill was drafted by the Hamilton Tiger-Cats with the ninth overall pick of the 2014 CFL draft. He opted to play one more season for the Bisons to get healthy, recover from a quadriceps injury, and possibly increase his chances at being an NFL draft pick. However, he was injured for most of the 2014 CIS football season.

In 2015, he was invited to rookie minicamp on a tryout basis with the New York Giants but did not receive medical clearance and did not participate. He signed with the Tiger-Cats ahead of the 2015 season, but sat out the whole year due to the ACL injury he endured in 2014. He suffered through two more injury-plagued years in 2016 and 2017, playing in only five total games with the Tiger-Cats.

=== Toronto Argonauts ===
On May 16, 2018, Gill signed with the Toronto Argonauts. He was released on June 10, 2018.

=== Edmonton Eskimos ===
Gill was signed to the practice roster of the Edmonton Eskimos on October 16, 2018. He was moved to the one-game injured list on October 23, and moved to the six-game injured list on November 2, 2018. He was released on April 29, 2019.
