= Dylan Ainsworth =

Canadian football player (born 1992)

No. 99
- Position: Defensive lineman

Personal information
- Born: November 19, 1992 (age 33); Delta, British Columbia, Canada
- Listed height: 6 ft 3 in (1.91 m)
- Listed weight: 242 lb (110 kg)

Career information
- High school: South Delta (Tsawwassen, British Columbia)
- University: Western
- CFL draft: 2014: 2nd round, 11th overall pick

Career history
- 2014–2016: Saskatchewan Roughriders
- 2017: BC Lions*
- * Offseason or practice squad member only
- Stats at CFL.ca

Dylan Ainsworth (born November 19, 1992) is a Canadian former professional football defensive lineman who played in the Canadian Football League (CFL). Ainsworth was drafted by the Saskatchewan Roughriders (CFL) in the second round of the 2014 CFL draft. He played CIS football at the University of Western Ontario, where he held the single season sack record of 9.5 sacks, and attended South Delta Secondary School in Tsawwassen, British Columbia.

== College career ==
Ainsworth played three seasons for the Western Ontario Mustangs. He earned CIS second-team All-Canadian honours in 2013.

== Professional career ==
Ainsworth was drafted by the Saskatchewan Roughriders of the CFL with the eleventh overall pick in the 2014 CFL draft. Ainsworth played 35 games in his first two seasons in the CFL, playing mostly on special teams. He contributed 29 special teams tackles and 1 defensive tackle. He was re-signed by the Riders in February 2016 on a one-year contract, but he missed the entire 2016 season after suffering an injury in training camp. On January 27, 2017, about two weeks before becoming a free agent, Ainsworth was released by the Riders along with three of his teammates.

On February 10, 2017, Ainsworth was signed by the BC Lions of the CFL. Ainsworth, a native of Vancouver, signed with the Lions to care for his father who was suffering from multiple myeloma. Ainsworth did not play in any games for the Lions.
