= David Foucault =

Canadian gridiron football player (born 1989)

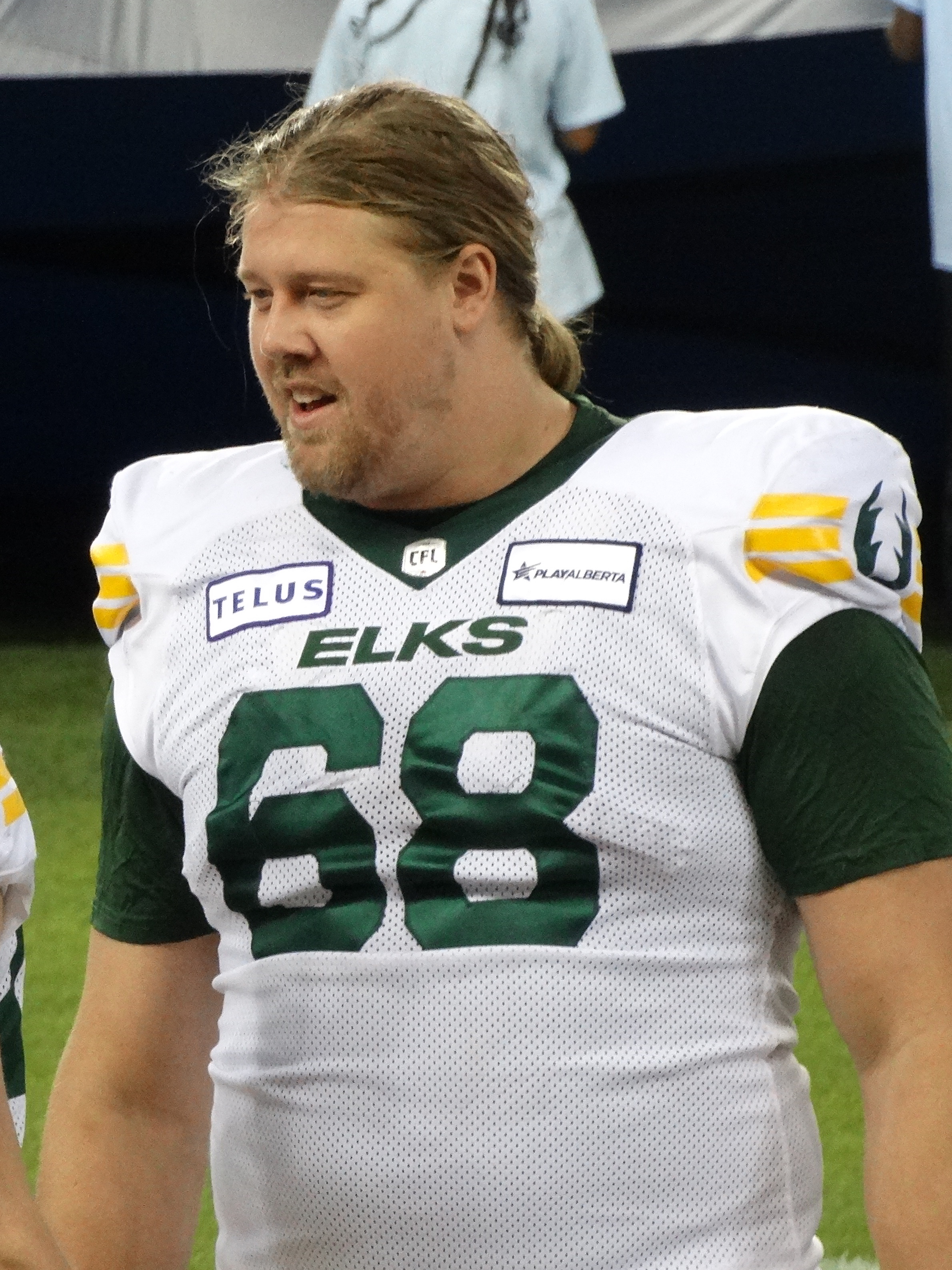
- Foucault with the Edmonton Elks in 2023

Profile
- Position: Offensive lineman

Personal information
- Born: February 7, 1989 (age 37); LaSalle, Quebec, Canada
- Listed height: 6 ft 8 in (2.03 m)
- Listed weight: 323 lb (147 kg)

Career information
- University: Montreal
- NFL draft: 2014: undrafted
- CFL draft: 2014: 1st round, 5th overall pick

Career history
- Carolina Panthers (2014–2016); BC Lions (2017–2019); Montreal Alouettes (2021); Edmonton Elks (2022–2024); BC Lions (2025)

Career NFL statistics
- Games played: 5
- Games started: 1
- Stats at Pro Football Reference
- Stats at CFL.ca

David Foucault (born February 7, 1989) is a Canadian professional football offensive lineman. He played Canadian Interuniversity Sport (CIS) football for the Montreal Carabins. He has also played for the Carolina Panthers of the National Football League (NFL) and the Montreal Alouettes and Edmonton Elks of the CFL.

== Professional career ==
Foucault was selected fifth overall by the Montreal Alouettes (CFL) in the 2014 CFL draft. Along with Antoine Pruneau, he became one of the first two Montreal Carabins chosen in the first round of the CFL draft. The Alouettes continued to hold his player rights until April 2017.

=== Carolina Panthers ===
==== 2014 season ====
Unlike fellow Québécois NFL rookie Laurent Duvernay-Tardif, Foucault was not drafted into the NFL, but he was invited to the Carolina Panthers, the Indianapolis Colts, and the Miami Dolphins rookie camps. He attended the Panthers' camp because the team had fewer offensive linemen competing for positions than the Colts and the Dolphins. The Panthers signed him following the tryout. On August 31, the team announced that Foucault had made the final 53-man roster.

==== 2015 season ====
On September 5, 2015, Foucault was released by the Panthers. On September 7, 2015, he was signed to the Panthers' practice squad. On October 2, Foucault was called up from the practice squad.

On October 6, he was cut from the team, but signed once again to the practice squad on October 8.

As of January 17, 2016, Foucault was on the Panther's practice squad

On February 7, 2016, Foucault's Panthers played in Super Bowl 50. In the game, the Panthers fell to the Denver Broncos by a score of 24–10.

==== 2016 season ====
On August 28, 2016, Foucault was waived by the Panthers.

=== BC Lions (first stint) ===
On March 27, 2017, the BC Lions (CFL) acquired the rights to Foucault and offensive lineman Vincent Brown from the Montreal Alouettes in exchange for international offensive lineman Jovan Olafioye and future considerations. On April 11, 2017, the Lions and Foucault agreed to a three-year contract through the 2019 CFL season. He played in 51 regular season games with the Lions that year, then became a free agent when his contract expired at the end of the season.

=== Montreal Alouettes ===
On February 8, 2021, it was announced that Foucault had signed with the Montreal Alouettes. He played in 13 games for the Alouettes, but was released shortly after the season ended on December 20, 2021.

=== Edmonton Elks ===
Foucault signed with the Edmonton Elks on January 3, 2022. On November 7, 2022, the Edmonton Elks extended Foucault’s contract for two years, through the 2024 season. He became a free agent upon the expiry of his contract on February 11, 2025.

=== BC Lions (second stint) ===
On February 11, 2025, it was announced that Foucault had re-signed with the BC Lions. On June 6, 2025, Foucault was placed on the Lions' 6-game injured list to start the 2025 CFL season due an injury sustained during a preseason game three days prior. Foucault remained on the Lions' 6-game injured list for the entire 2025 CFL season. On February 10, 2026, Foucault became a free agent at the conclusion of his contract with the Lions.
