= Beau Landry =

Canadian football player (born 1991)

No. 23, 20, 51
- Position: Linebacker

Personal information
- Born: September 24, 1991 (age 35); Kitchener, Ontario, Canada
- Listed height: 5 ft 11 in (1.80 m)
- Listed weight: 201 lb (91 kg)

Career information
- University: Western
- CFL draft: 2014: 1st round, 8th overall pick

Career history
- 2014–2016: Hamilton Tiger-Cats
- 2017: Calgary Stampeders
- 2017: Saskatchewan Roughriders
- Stats at CFL.ca

Beau Landry (born September 24, 1991) is a Canadian former professional football linebacker. He was selected by the Hamilton Tiger-Cats with the eighth overall pick in the 2014 CFL draft after playing CIS football at the University of Western Ontario.

== University career ==
Landry played from 2010 to 2013 for the Western Mustangs. He recorded a total of 130.5 defensive tackles, six quarterback sacks, four interceptions, five forced fumbles and three fumble recoveries with the Mustangs. He was a first-team OUA All-Star and first-team All-Canadian in 2013. Landry was also a first-team OUA All-Star and first-team All-Canadian in 2011. He participated in the 2013 CIS East-West Bowl as a member of the West team.

== Professional career ==
Landry was drafted by the Hamilton Tiger-Cats in the first round of the 2014 CFL draft. He was ranked No. 15 in the final CFL Scouting Bureau rankings in April 2014.

Landry signed with the Calgary Stampeders on February 15, 2017. He was released on August 24, 2017, never appearing in a game for the Stampeders.

On August 29, 2017, Landry signed to the practice roster of the Saskatchewan Roughriders.
