= South Delta Secondary School =

South Delta Secondary

Location
- 750 53 Street; Delta, British Columbia, V4M 3B7; Canada

Information
- School type: Public, high school
- Motto: Excelleremus Diligenter (Excellence with Diligence)
- Founded: 1973
- School board: School District 37 Delta
- Superintendent: Doug Sheppard
- School number: 3737037
- Principal: Ben Scarr
- Staff: 110
- Grades: 8-12 standard and French immersion programs
- Enrollment: 1,499 (2019/20)
- Language: English and French
- Area: Tsawwassen
- Colours: Yellow, Blue
- Mascot: Sun Devil
- Team name: Sun Devils
- Website: sd.deltasd.bc.ca
- Last updated: January 8, 2021

South Delta Secondary (SDSS) is a public high school in Tsawwassen, British Columbia, Canada. There are approximately 1,500 students enrolled in each grade 8 through 12 (as of 2019/2020). Graduation rates in the years 2005 to 2010 vary between 95% and 99%.

SDSS feeder schools include all the public elementary schools in Tsawwassen: South Park, Cliff Drive, Beach Grove, English Bluff and Pebble Hill. The school is near Dennison Park, and outdoor gym classes often occur there rather than on school grounds. SDSS shares its track with South Park Elementary School, and hosts the district and regional Track and Field events.

SDSS is the only secondary school in South Delta that has a French Immersion program. Any students from Ladner that wish to continue with French Immersion in high school must go to South Delta Secondary, since there is no French Immersion at Delta Secondary (in Ladner community). Students who complete the French Immersion program at SDSS will graduate with a Double Dogwood diploma.

Tsawwassen used to also have a public Junior high school, Tsawwassen Junior Secondary (TJS). In 1994, TJS merged with South Delta Senior Secondary to form South Delta Secondary School. During the following years students from Grades 8 through 12 attended classes in both the Senior (North) and Junior (South) buildings. In 2003, the South building property was sold and the building which formerly housed the Junior High school was demolished; it is now a housing development. The North building was subsequently expanded to accommodate all students, and now South Delta Secondary is the only public high school in the community of Tsawwassen.

Special programs at SDSS include a Hockey Academy, Soccer Academy, Film Acting/Production Academy, and Culinary Arts program. Since the 2012–2013 school year, SDSS has also had Sustainable Earth Academy.

== Notable alumni ==
- Dylan Ainsworth, CFL player
- Jonathon Blum, 23rd overall pick by Nashville Predators at 2007 NHL entry draft
- Gilbert Brulé, 6th overall pick by Columbus Blue Jackets at 2006 NHL entry draft
- Cody Franson, 79th overall pick by Nashville Predators at 2005 NHL entry draft
- Brendan Gallagher, National Hockey League player, Montreal Canadiens #11
- Harald Hasselbach, former NFL player
- Matt Hill, Canadian/American actor: 21 Jump Street, The X Files, graduated 1986
- Jay Johnstone, former professional soccer player, graduated 1977
- Evander Kane, 4th overall pick by Atlanta Thrashers at 2009 NHL entry draft
- Milan Lucic, National Hockey League player, Calgary Flames #17
- Michael MacLennan Canadian playwright, screenwriter, TV producer, graduated 1986
- Jesse Newman, CFL player
- Mark Rogers (soccer), professional soccer player, Wycombe Wanderers Football Club, Canadian National Team, graduated 1993
- Brent Seabrook, National Hockey League player, Chicago Blackhawks #7
- Troy Stecher, defenseman of the Edmonton Oilers of the NHL
- Markus Thormeyer, Canadian competitive swimmer, graduated 2015
- Jody Vance, Canadian sportscaster, graduated 1985
- Ryley Esler, Video Director for Alice Cooper
