= Andrew Lue =

Canadian football player (born 1992)

Profile
- Position: Defensive back

Personal information
- Born: March 17, 1992 (age 34); Kingston, Jamaica
- Listed height: 6 ft 2 in (1.88 m)
- Listed weight: 210 lb (95 kg)

Career information
- College: Queen's
- CFL draft: 2014: 2nd round, 10th overall pick

Career history
- 2014–2016: Montreal Alouettes
- 2016: Saskatchewan Roughriders
- 2017: Edmonton Eskimos
- 2018: Ottawa Redblacks
- Stats at CFL.ca

Andrew Lue (born March 17, 1992) is a retired Canadian football defensive back. In the CFL's Amateur Scouting Bureau final rankings, he was ranked tenth best of the players eligible in the 2014 CFL draft. He was then drafted tenth overall by the Montreal Alouettes and signed with the team in May 2014. He was then traded to the Saskatchewan Roughriders on October 12, 2016. On February 14, 2017 hew signed a contract with the Edmonton Eskimos. He then signed a contract with the Ottawa Redblacks on February 15, 2018.

== Early life ==
Lue was born in Kingston, Jamaica and raised in Toronto, and Markham, Ontario. He played football and basketball at St. Brother André Catholic High School, where he competed as a wide receiver, defensive back and running back. He was a perennial all-star and was listed as a top 25 prospect in the Toronto area.

== University career ==
Lue attended Queen's University where he majored in Biology and Environmental Science. He played CIS Football as a starter for the Queen's Gaels as a cornerback for 4 years. He was named to the USports All-Canadian football team as a cornerback in 2011 and 2013, and named to the OUA All-Star football team in 2011, 2012 and 2013. He was invited to the 2014 CFL Combine where he jumped 10 ft 5 inches; to lead all participants in the broad jump, and tied for 5th for his vertical jump of 36.5". He graduated in May 2014 on the Dean's List and as an Academic All-Canadian.

== Professional career ==
Lue was drafted tenth overall by the Montreal Alouettes and signed with the team in May 2014.

=== Montreal Alouettes ===
Lue recorded his first tackle on June 28, 2014. He played with the Alouettes for 3 seasons.

=== Saskatchewan Roughriders ===
Lue signed with the Saskatchewan Roughriders on October 12, 2016.

=== Edmonton Eskimos ===
Lue signed with the Edmonton Eskimos on February 14, 2017.

=== Ottawa Redblacks ===
Lue signed with the Ottawa Redblacks on February 15, 2018.
