= Our Lady of Mount Carmel Secondary School =

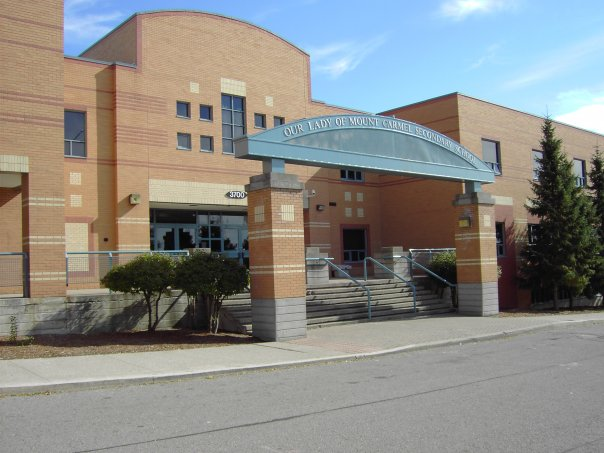

Location
- 3700 Trelawny Circle; Mississauga, Ontario, L5N 5J7; Canada; 43.5748°N 79.7725°W

Information
- School type: Catholic School
- Motto: One through prayer and learning
- Religious affiliation: Catholic
- Established: 1987
- School board: Dufferin-Peel Catholic District School Board
- Area trustee: Brea Corbet
- Principal: Jennifer Varnam
- Staff: 103
- Grades: 9-12
- Enrolment: 1,294 (2021-22 School Year)
- Colours: White, Red, Navy
- Mascot: Courage
- Website: www.dpcdsb.org/CARMS

Our Lady of Mount Carmel Catholic Secondary School is a Catholic separate school in Mississauga, Ontario. It is part of the Dufferin-Peel Catholic District School Board and is affiliated with the parish of St. John of the Cross.

The trustee is Brea Corbet and the principal is Mr. Vincent. The school has approximately 1,750 students.

The school has committees and clubs to encourage extra-curricular participation, such as the Photography club, Drama club and Student Council. Some clubs have special events within the school such as the Health Club; Pro-Life Club participates in the March for Life in Ottawa, Ontario; and the Comic Book Club writes, draws, and publishes their own comic books.

The school's Boys Senior Hockey Team were OFSAA Champions in 2002, 2003 and 2006.

The Punk rock band Billy Talent was formed by students at the school in 1993, originally under the name Pezz.

== Football ==
The school also had a football program that ran from 2000 to 2023 and won back-to-back Tier 2 ROPSSAA Football Championships in 2000 and 2001. The program also produced many CFL players.

== Notable alumni ==
- Tré Armstrong - judge on So You Think You Can Dance Canada
- Devon Bailey - Canadian Football League professional football player
- Ian D'Sa - member of punk rock band Billy Talent
- Jonathan Gallant - member of the punk rock band Billy Talent
- Raye Hartmann - Canadian Football League professional football player
- Benjamin Kowalewicz - member of the punk rock band Billy Talent
- Matt Moulson - NHL professional hockey player (Buffalo Sabres)
- Ese Mrabure-Ajufo - Canadian Football League professional football player
- Kian Schaffer-Baker, Canadian Football League professional football player
- Aaron Solowoniuk - member of punk rock band Billy Talent

== See also ==
- Education in Ontario
- List of secondary schools in Ontario
