= Matthias Goossen =

Canadian football player (born 1992)

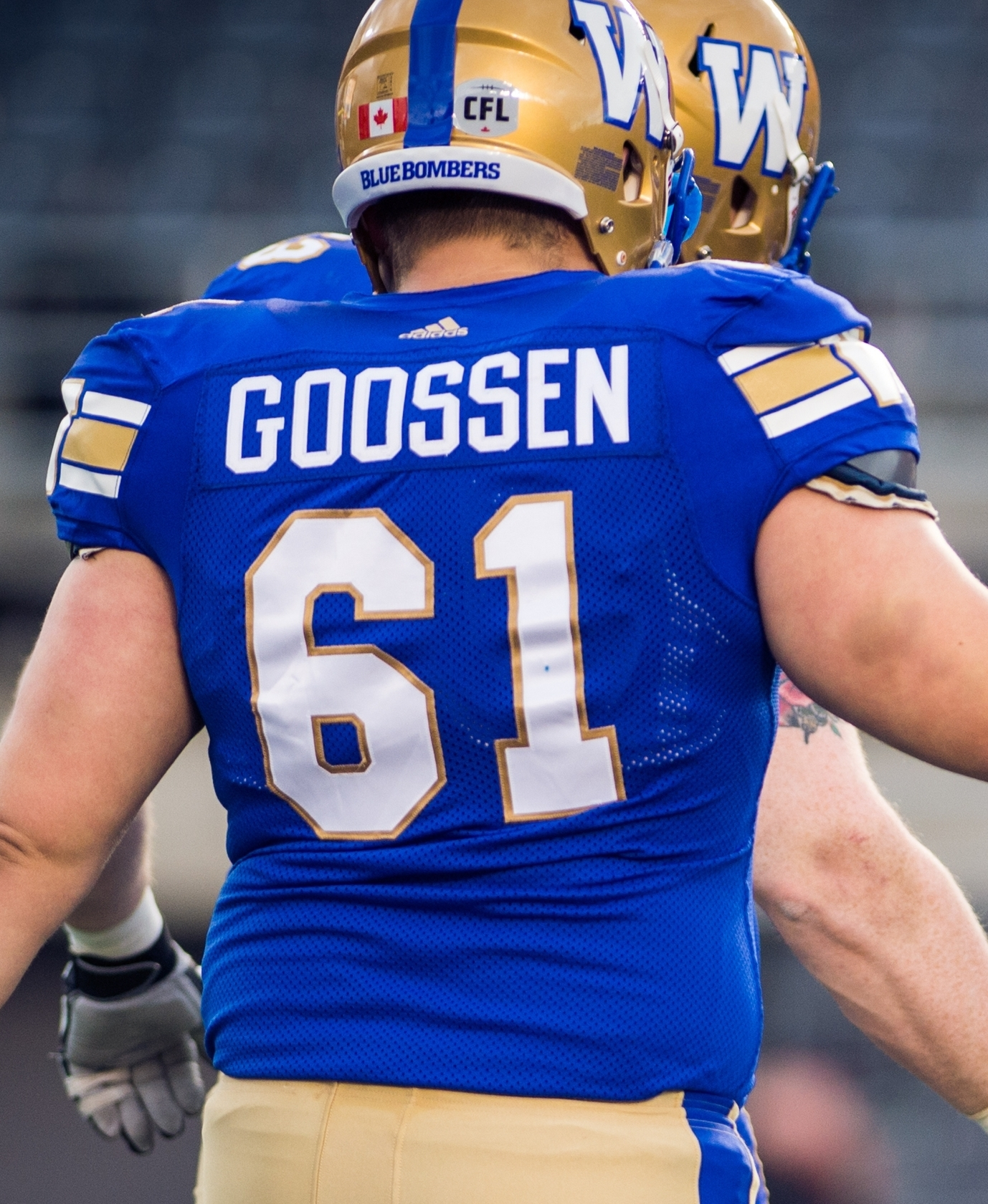
- Goossen with the Winnipeg Blue Bombers in 2016

No. 61
- Position: Centre

Personal information
- Born: October 14, 1992 (age 34); Richmond, British Columbia
- Listed height: 6 ft 4 in (1.93 m)
- Listed weight: 300 lb (136 kg)

Career information
- High school: Vancouver College Fighting Irish
- University: Simon Fraser
- CFL draft: 2014: 1st round, 2nd overall pick

Career history
- 2014–2018: Winnipeg Blue Bombers

Awards and highlights
- CFL All-Star (2018); CFL West All-Star (2018)
- Stats at CFL.ca

Matthias Goossen (born October 14, 1992) is a Canadian former professional football centre who played for the Winnipeg Blue Bombers of the Canadian Football League (CFL). Prior to being drafted into the CFL, he played college football for the Simon Fraser Clan.

== College career ==
As a freshman at Simon Fraser, Goossen was part of Clan's inaugural season in the NCAA. He served as a captain in his last two years of college, and was named a first-team GNAC all star three times.

== Professional career ==
Goossen was selected in the first round of the 2014 CFL draft, second overall, by the Winnipeg Blue Bombers. He signed a three-year contract with the Bombers on May 28. On January 29, 2019, he announced his retirement from professional football, as he was about to enter free agency the following month. Goossen planned to become an officer with his local police department in Vancouver, BC.
