= Maxx Forde =

American gridiron football player (born 1991)

No. 99
- Position: Defensive lineman

Personal information
- Born: November 15, 1991 (age 34); Seattle, Washington
- Listed height: 6 ft 5 in (1.96 m)
- Listed weight: 262 lb (119 kg)

Career information
- College: Idaho
- CFL draft: 2015: 7th round, 58th overall pick

Career history
- 2015–2018: BC Lions
- 2018: Ottawa Redblacks*
- 2018: BC Lions*
- 2019: Winnipeg Blue Bombers*
- * Offseason or practice squad member only
- Stats at CFL.ca

Maxx Forde (born November 15, 1991) is a Canadian football defensive lineman. He was selected in the seventh round and 58th overall by the BC Lions in the 2015 CFL draft. His father, Brian Forde, played for the Lions in 1994 and 1995. Because the elder Forde was born in Montreal, Maxx Forde qualifies as a national player in the CFL, despite being born and raised in the United States. After spending parts of four seasons with the Lions, Forde was traded to the Redblacks on September 8, 2018. However, this trade was voided after Forde failed his physical exam and he remained with the Lions. He became a free agent on February 12, 2019 and signed with the Blue Bombers on February 24, 2019. He played college football with the Idaho Vandals.
