= Ese Mrabure-Ajufo =

Canadian gridiron football player (born 1992)

Wilfrid Laurier Golden Hawks
- Title: Defensive line coach
- CFL status: National

Personal information
- Born: December 5, 1992 (age 33); North York, Ontario, Canada
- Listed height: 6 ft 4 in (1.93 m)
- Listed weight: 285 lb (129 kg)

Career information
- High school: Our Lady of Mount Carmel
- University: Wilfrid Laurier
- CFL draft: 2015: 1st round, 5th overall pick

Career history

Playing
- 2015: BC Lions
- 2016–2017: Saskatchewan Roughriders
- 2018–2019: Calgary Stampeders
- 2021: Ottawa Redblacks
- 2022: Edmonton Elks

Coaching
- 2024–present: Wilfrid Laurier
- Stats at CFL.ca

Ese Mrabure-Ajufo (born December 5, 1992) is a Canadian former professional football defensive lineman who is currently the defensive line coach for the Wilfrid Laurier Golden Hawks of U Sports football.

== Amateur career ==
Mrabure-Ajufo played high school football in his senior year at Our Lady of Mount Carmel Secondary School. From 2011 to 2014, he played university football for the Wilfrid Laurier Golden Hawks. He recorded 50 tackles, 5.5 sacks, and a fumble recovery. He was an OUA second-team all-star in his senior year. In 2014, Mrabure-Ajufo was invited to the East-West Bowl. During the East-West Bowl combine, he received the best scores in the 40-yard dash, vertical jump, and broad jump among defensive lineman.

== Professional career ==
=== BC Lions ===
Mrabure-Ajufo was drafted in the first round of the 2015 CFL draft by the BC Lions with the fifth overall pick, despite being projected as a second round pick by the Canadian Football League Scouting Bureau. He made his CFL debut on July 4, 2015 against the Ottawa Redblacks, where he registered one special teams tackle. Mrabure-Ajufo was released on June 19, 2016.

=== Saskatchewan Roughriders ===
On June 26, 2016, Mrabure-Ajufo signed with the Saskatchewan Roughriders. In two seasons, he played in 32 regular season games where he had 38 defensive tackles and three quarterback sacks.

=== Calgary Stampeders ===
On February 13, 2018, Mrabure-Ajufo signed with the Calgary Stampeders on the first day of free agency. He played in 11 regular season games in 2018 where he had four defensive tackles and two sacks. He was on the injured list when the Stampeders won the 106th Grey Cup championship. He played in only two games in 2019 as he was on the injured list for the other 16 games that season. He became a free agent in 2020, but did not play due to the cancellation of the 2020 CFL season.

=== Ottawa Redblacks ===
On January 15, 2021, Mrabure-Ajufo signed with the Ottawa Redblacks. He played in six games, but did not record any stats. He was released on May 6, 2022.

=== Edmonton Elks ===
The Edmonton Elks announced the signing of Mrabure-Ajufo on May 16, 2022. He became a free agent after the 2022 season.

== Coaching career ==
Mrabure-Ajufo joined the Wilfrid Laurier Golden Hawks in 2025 as the team's defensive line coach.
