= Max Caron =

Canadian football player (born 1989)

No. 43
- Position: Linebacker

Personal information
- Born: August 20, 1989 (age 37); Kingston, Ontario, Canada
- Listed height: 6 ft 2 in (1.88 m)
- Listed weight: 222 lb (101 kg)

Career information
- University: Concordia
- CFL draft: 2014: 2nd round, 16th overall pick

Career history
- 2014–2016: Calgary Stampeders

Awards and highlights
- Grey Cup champion (2014); Presidents' Trophy (2011)

Career CFL statistics
- Games played: 2
- Total tackles: 3
- Stats at CFL.ca

Max Caron (born August 20, 1989) is a Canadian former professional football linebacker. He was drafted by the Calgary Stampeders in the second round of the 2014 CFL draft, but only appeared in two career games due to injury. He announced his retirement from professional football on May 22, 2017.
