= Josh Bartel =

Australian gridiron football player (born 1985)

Profile
- Position: Punter

Personal information
- Born: 23 April 1985 (age 41); Wodonga, Victoria, Australia
- Listed height: 6 ft 3 in (1.91 m)
- Listed weight: 200 lb (91 kg)

Career history
- Hamilton Tiger-Cats (2012–2013); Saskatchewan Roughriders (2014); Saskatchewan Roughriders (2016–2018); BC Lions (2019)

Awards and highlights
- 2× CFL East All-Star (2012, 2013)
- Stats at CFL.ca

Josh Bartel (born 23 April 1985) is an Australian former professional Canadian football punter who played for the Hamilton Tiger-Cats, Saskatchewan Roughriders, and BC Lions of the Canadian Football League (CFL).

Before going to the CFL, Bartel played Australian rules football for the Wodonga Football Club.

== Australian rules football career ==
In June 2010, Bartel quit Wodonga to pursue a gridiron football career in North America.

== Professional career ==
Bartel joined the Hamilton Tiger-Cats of the Canadian Football League in 2012 after leaving Australia and failing to make a National Football League team. Under rules in place at the time, Bartel was considered a "non-import" player because he received his football training in Canada. The rules changed after 31 May 2014, but Bartel was grandfathered in as a "National Player".

In 2012, his first season in the CFL, Bartel punted for 4,985 yards on 116 punts, an average of 43.0 yards per punt, and was named an East Division All-Star.

In 2013, Bartel punted for 4,897 yards on 112 punts, bringing his average up to 43.7 yards per punt. Bartel was again named an East Division All-Star in 2013.

On 17 February 2014, Bartel was traded to the Saskatchewan Roughriders. The 2014 season saw him punt for 4,616 yards on 106 punts, an average of 43.5 yards per punt.

He returned to Australia for the 2015 season, but on 21 January 2016, the Saskatchewan Roughriders announced that Bartel had signed a contract to play for the 2016 season. He punted 134 times for 6,046 yards, an average of 45.1 yards per punt.

On 1 March 2017, Bartel signed a contract extension with the Roughriders that carried through the 2019 CFL season. However, following the signing of Jon Ryan, Bartel was released on 14 May 2019.

On 8 July 2019, it was announced that Bartel had signed with the BC Lions.

== Personal life ==
In Australia, Bartel had a job lined up selling car tires but instead came to Canada to punt in the CFL.

Bartel's cousin, Jimmy, played for the Geelong Cats in the Australian Football League from 2002 to 2016
