= Pierre Lavertu =

Canadian football player (born 1990)

No. 63
- Position: Offensive lineman

Personal information
- Born: May 11, 1990 (age 36); Quebec City, Quebec, Canada
- Listed height: 6 ft 3 in (1.91 m)
- Listed weight: 298 lb (135 kg)

Career information
- University: Laval
- CFL draft: 2014: 1st round, 1st overall pick

Career history
- 2014–2017: Calgary Stampeders

Awards and highlights
- Grey Cup champion (2014); CFL West All-Star (2015)
- Stats at CFL.ca

Pierre Lavertu (born May 11, 1990) is a Canadian former professional football offensive lineman who played for the Calgary Stampeders of the Canadian Football League (CFL). He was selected by the Stampeders with the first overall pick in the 2014 CFL draft after playing CIS football at Laval University.

== College career ==
Lavertu played football for the Laval Rouge et Or. He was a four-time Quebec conference All-Star and a three-time CIS All-Canadian. He was a member of the Rouge et Or’s Vanier Cup-winning teams in 2010, 2012 and 2013.

== Professional career ==
Lavertu was drafted by the Calgary Stampeders with the first pick in the 2014 CFL draft. He signed with the Stampeders on May 29, 2014. He made his CFL debut on June 28, 2014 against the Montreal Alouettes. Lavertu played for four seasons in the CFL, spending the 2017 season on injured reserve before announcing his retirement in April 2018. Lavertu played in 41 games in his three active seasons, but was hampered by injuries in 2016 and then missed all of 2017. After consulting with doctors he determined he would not be able to play at the level he expected of himself, and thus announced his decision to retire from professional football.
