= Mark Washington (Canadian football) =

American gridiron football player and coach (born 1973)

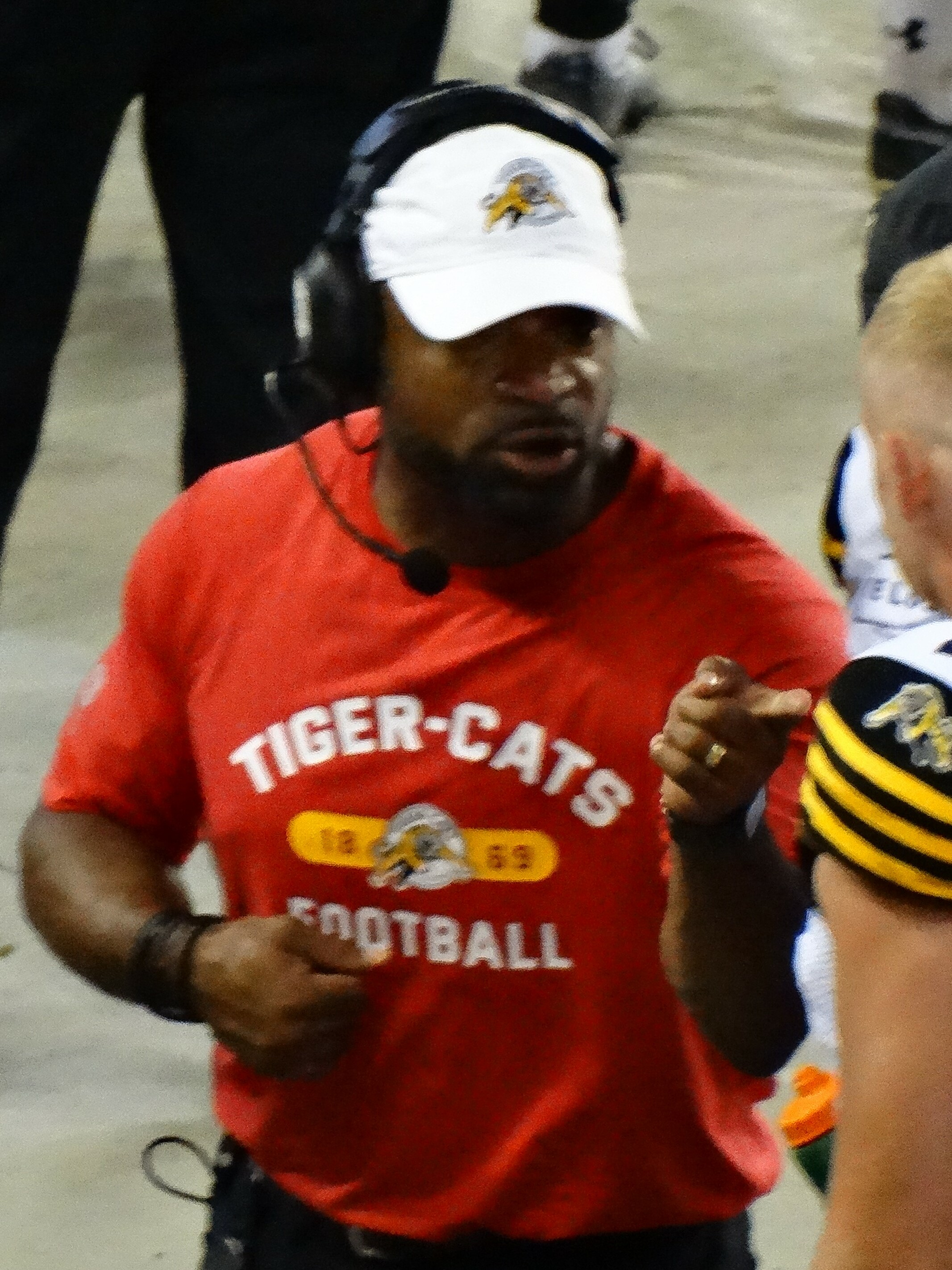
- Washington with the Hamilton Tiger-Cats in 2022

Profile
- Positions: Defensive coordinator, defensive backs coach

Personal information
- Born: April 16, 1973 (age 53); Washington, D.C., U.S.
- Listed height: 5 ft 9 in (1.75 m)
- Listed weight: 180 lb (82 kg)

Career information
- College: Rutgers

Career history

Playing
- 1997: New York CityHawks
- 1997–2002: Montreal Alouettes
- 2003–2007: BC Lions

Coaching
- 2008–2013: BC Lions (Defensive backs coach)
- 2014–2018: BC Lions (Defensive coordinator)
- 2019–2024: Hamilton Tiger-Cats (Defensive coordinator/DB coach)

Awards and highlights
- 3× Grey Cup champion (2002, 2006, 2011); Tom Pate Memorial Award (2006)
- Stats at CFL.ca (archive)

Mark Washington (born April 16, 1973) is an American professional football coach and former player. He played at defensive back in the Canadian Football League (CFL), having played for the Montreal Alouettes and the BC Lions over 11 seasons. After his retirement, he joined the Lions as the defensive backs coach, and was promoted to defensive coordinator for the 2014 BC Lions season. Washington was also the defensive coordinator for the Hamilton Tiger-Cats.

== College career ==
Washington attended Rutgers University. As a junior at Rutgers, he was an All-Big East performer, and as a senior, he was the team captain.

== Professional career ==
Washington began his pro career with the Barcelona Dragons of NFL Europa, where he won a World Bowl in 1997. He played six seasons for the Montreal Alouettes, from 1997 to 2002, recording nine interceptions (and returning two for touchdowns) and winning a Grey Cup in 2002. He moved in 2003, as a free agent, to the BC Lions, where in five seasons he intercepted eight passes (one for a TD), was named an all-star in 2003, and won the Grey Cup in 2006. He retired on January 31, 2008.

== Coaching and broadcasting ==
After his playing career, he became the defensive backs coach of the BC Lions, and also began a career in television broadcasting, co-hosting a local talk-show. On December 12, 2013 it was announced that he would become the new defensive coordinator for the BC Lions.

Mark Washington was named defensive coordinator and defensive backs coach for the Hamilton Tiger-Cats on January 16, 2019. On November 29, 2022, it was reported by TSN insider Farhan Lalji that Washington was one of three finalists for the vacant Ottawa Redblacks head coaching job. After struggles on defence contributed to the Tiger-Cats' CFL-worst 2–8 record, it was announced on August 19, 2024, that Washington had been fired by the team.
