= Adam Thibault =

Canadian football player (born 1990)

No. 00
- Position: Defensive back

Personal information
- Born: March 26, 1990 (age 36); Quebec City, Quebec, Canada
- Listed height: 6 ft 0 in (1.83 m)
- Listed weight: 202 lb (92 kg)

Career information
- University: Laval
- CFL draft: 2014: 3rd round, 24th overall pick

Career history
- 2014–2018: Calgary Stampeders
- 2021: Toronto Argonauts

Awards and highlights
- 2× Grey Cup champion (2014, 2018)
- Stats at CFL.ca

Adam Thibault (born March 26, 1990) is a Canadian former professional football defensive back who played in the Canadian Football League (CFL). He won his first Grey Cup championship in his rookie year with the Calgary Stampeders in 2014 after winning three Vanier Cup championships with Laval.

== College career ==
Thibault spent his collegiate career playing for the Laval Rouge et Or. He played wide receiver his first three seasons before becoming a defensive back during the 2013 season, a season in which the team went 8–0. He appeared in the Vanier Cup all four years on campus, winning three times in those four years.

He improved his draft prospects at the CFL Combine, where he recorded the fastest 40-yard dash (4.454 seconds) and had the best time in the right-left agility drill. He received an invitation for the 2014 NFL National Football League Super Regional Combine.

== Professional career ==
=== Calgary Stampeders ===
Thibault was originally selected by the Calgary Stampeders in the third round (24th overall) of the 2014 CFL draft. He began his tenure with the Stampeders as a member of the practice squad for the 2014 season, and was promoted to the active roster in the August 9 game against the Ottawa Redblacks at McMahon Stadium, recording the tackle on the opening kickoff. During that season, Thibault played in eight regular season games, recording five special teams tackles. He appeared in the Western Final, where he registered two special teams tackles, and in the 102nd Grey Cup, where he made a special teams tackle in the Stampeders' victory.

In 2015, Thibault played in 15 regular season games, recording a team-leading 13 special teams tackles. He scored his first career professional touchdown from a blocked punt that he returned 10 yards for the score on July 18, 2015 against the Winnipeg Blue Bombers. In 2016, he played in 16 regular season games and had a career-high 19 special teams tackles while also recording another fumble recovery. He missed eight games in 2017, but saw more time on defensive as he recorded the first four defensive tackles of his career. He played in eight games in 2018, but was injured in September and was on the injured list when the Stampeders won the 106th Grey Cup. He became a free agent upon the expiry of his contract on February 12, 2019.

=== Toronto Argonauts ===
After last playing a game over three years prior, Thibault signed with the Toronto Argonauts on November 28, 2021, just before the team's East Final game against the Hamilton Tiger-Cats. He became a free agent after the season.
