= Raye Hartmann =

Canadian football player (born 1990)

No. 29
- Position: Defensive back

Personal information
- Born: February 17, 1990 (age 36); Mississauga, Ontario, Canada
- Listed height: 6 ft 2 in (1.88 m)
- Listed weight: 188 lb (85 kg)

Career information
- High school: Our Lady of Mount Carmel
- University: St. Francis Xavier
- CFL draft: 2014: 4th round, 30th overall pick

Career history
- 2014–2015: Edmonton Eskimos
- 2016: Saskatchewan Roughriders

Awards and highlights
- Grey Cup champion (2015)
- Stats at CFL.ca

Raye Hartmann (born February 17, 1990) is a retired Canadian football defensive back. He was selected in the fourth round of the 2014 CFL draft by the Edmonton Eskimos with the 30th overall pick. After he spent 2014 and the start of the 2015 season on the practice roster, Hartmann made his CFL debut on August 6, 2015 against the BC Lions, where he played mostly on the special teams. He attended St. Francis Xavier University where he played CIS football for the X-Men. He won All Star honours in his freshman and sophomore years, his only two years with the X-Men. He joined the roster of the Saskatchewan Roughriders in June 2016.
