= Eric Black (Canadian football) =

American football player (born 1999)

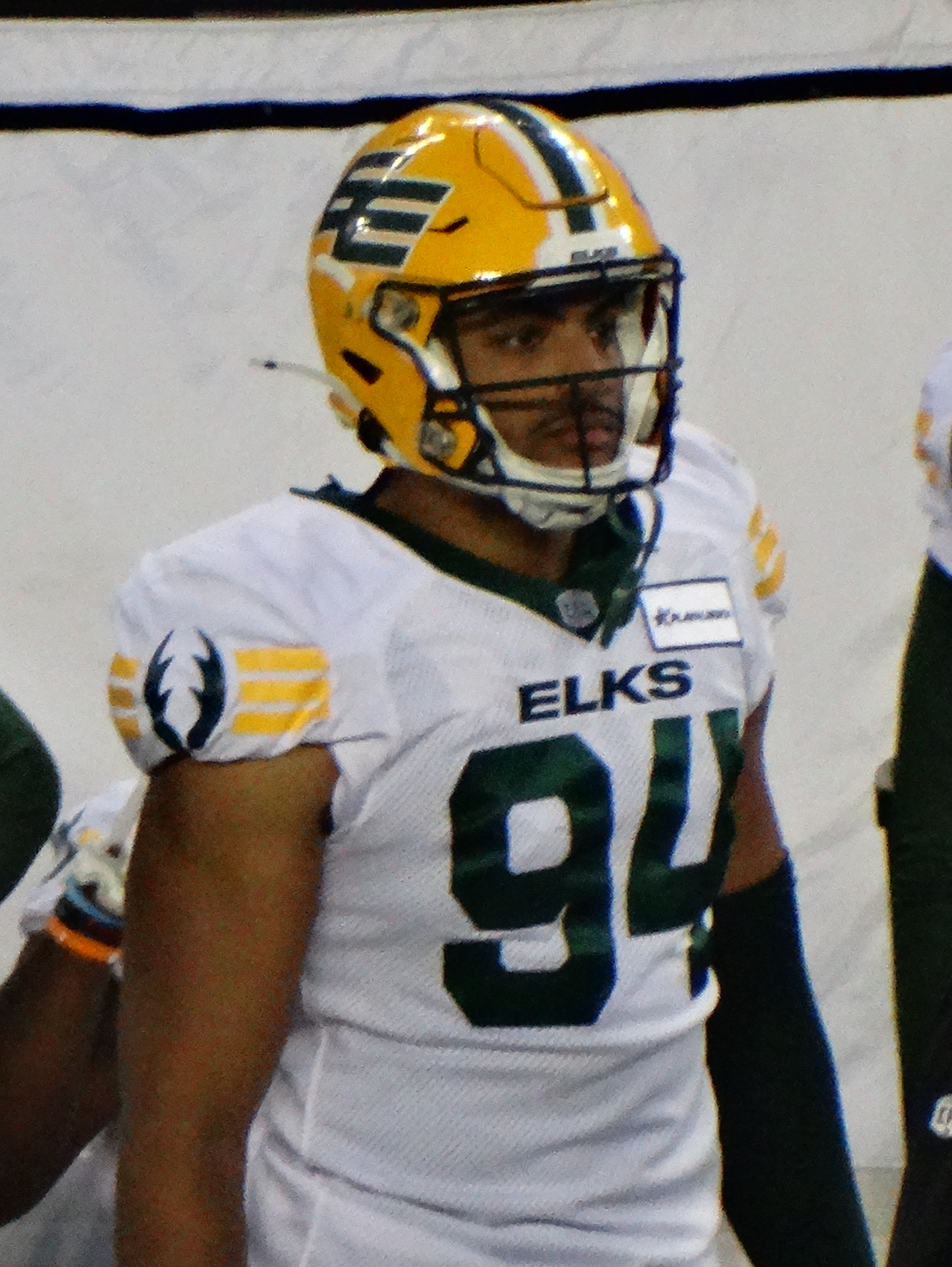
- Black with the Edmonton Elks in 2024

Profile
- Position: Defensive lineman

Personal information
- Born: April 13, 1999 (age 27); Rochester, New York, U.S.
- Listed height: 6 ft 4 in (1.93 m)
- Listed weight: 247 lb (112 kg)

Career information
- High school: Rush–Henrietta (Henrietta, New York)
- College: Buffalo (2017–2021); Stony Brook (2022)
- NFL draft: 2023: undrafted

Career history
- Edmonton Elks (2024); Saskatchewan Roughriders (2024); Ottawa Redblacks (2025)*; Winnipeg Blue Bombers (2026)*
- * Offseason or practice squad member only
- Stats at CFL.ca

Eric Black (born April 13, 1999) is an American professional football defensive lineman. He played college football at Buffalo and Stony Brook.

== Early life ==
Eric Black was born on April 13, 1999, in Rochester, New York. He played high school football at Rush–Henrietta Senior High School in Henrietta, New York, as a wide receiver. He earned All-Greater Rochester and All-County honors as a senior in 2016.

== College career ==
Black first played college football for the Buffalo Bulls of the University of Buffalo. He joined the team as a walk-on, and was moved to defensive end. He was redshirted in 2017. Black was put on scholarship as a sophomore in 2018 and appeared in one game, posting one solo tackle. He played in 11 games during the 2019 season, recording five solo tackles, one assisted tackle, and one fumble recovery. He started all seven games at defensive end during the COVID-19 shortened 2020 season, totaling five solo tackles, seven assisted tackles, three sacks, and one forced fumble. He had two sacks during Marshall's final drive in the 2020 Camellia Bowl, helping to seal Buffalo's 17–10 victory. Black played in ten games in 2021, recording seven solo tackles, ten assisted tackles, 2,5 sacks, one forced fumble, and one fumble recovery. He majored in business administration at Buffalo.

In 2022, Black transferred to play his final season of college football for the Stony Brook Seawolves as a graduate student. He played in ten games during the 2022 season, posting 11 solo tackles, eight assisted tackles, five sacks, one forced fumble, and four pass breakups. His sack total was the most on the team that year. Black also graduated from Stony Brook with a Master of Business Administration.

== Professional career ==
Black participated at Army's pro day in 2023. After going undrafted in the 2023 NFL draft, Black was invited to rookie minicamp on a tryout basis with the New York Giants.

Black was signed to the practice roster of the Edmonton Elks of the Canadian Football League (CFL) on June 2, 2024. He was promoted to the active roster on June 20 and dressed in two games for the Elks during the 2024 CFL season, recording four tackles on defense and one tackle on special teams. Black was moved back to the practice roster on July 7, and was released on July 21, 2024.

Black was signed to the practice roster of the CFL's Saskatchewan Roughriders on August 5, 2024. He was promoted to the active roster on September 19, moved back to the practice roster on September 27, promoted back to the active roster the next day, and moved back to the practice roster again on October 4, 2024. He dressed in two games overall for Saskatchewan during the 2024 season and posted one special teams tackle. Black was the second Rochester-born player to play for the Roughriders after Scott Virkus in 1986. Black signed a futures contract with Saskatchewan on November 14, 2024. He was later released on June 1, 2025, before the start of the 2025 CFL season.

On August 5, 2025, Black was signed to the practice roster of the CFL's Ottawa Redblacks. He was released on August 31, 2025.

On May 4, 2026, Black signed with the Winnipeg Blue Bombers of the CFL. He was released on May 13, 2026.
