= Derek Wiggan =

Canadian football player (born 1992)

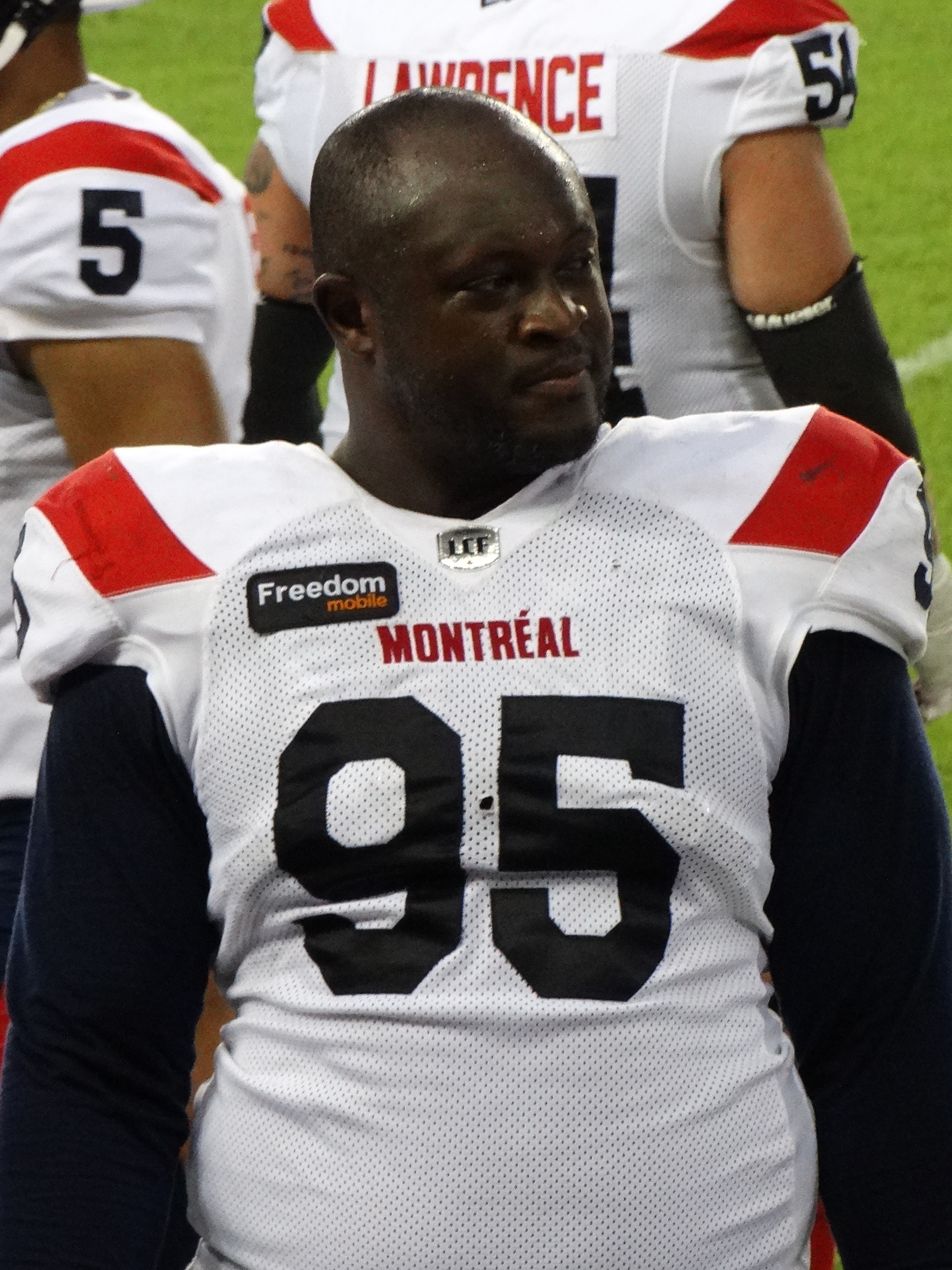
- Wiggan with the Montreal Alouettes in 2024

No. 97, 95
- Position: Defensive lineman

Personal information
- Born: July 27, 1992 (age 34); Toronto, Ontario, Canada
- Listed height: 6 ft 1 in (1.85 m)
- Listed weight: 250 lb (113 kg)

Career information
- High school: St. Michael's College School
- College: Queen's
- CFL draft: 2014: 4th round, 34th overall pick

Career history
- 2014: Calgary Stampeders*
- 2015–2023: Calgary Stampeders
- 2024: Montreal Alouettes
- * Offseason or practice squad member only

Awards and highlights
- Grey Cup champion (2018)
- Stats at CFL.ca

Derek Wiggan (born July 27, 1992) is a Canadian former professional football defensive lineman who play in nine seasons in the Canadian Football League (CFL) for the Calgary Stampeders and Montreal Alouettes. He is a Grey Cup champion after winning with the Stampeders in 2018.

== Amateur career ==
From 2006 to 2009, Wiggan played high school football for St. Michael's College School. In 2008, he was a part of the championship team that won the Metro Bowl. He also participated in shot put events with the track and field team from 2008 to 2010.

Wiggan played college football for the Queen's Golden Gaels from 2010 to 2014 as a defensive end. In 2013, he made 28 tackles, 5.5 sacks, and forced two fumbles to become a first-team OUA all-star. He recorded 36 tackles, 5.5 sacks, and recovered four fumbles the next year. Wiggan was named a second-team OUA all-star in 2014.

== Professional career ==
=== Calgary Stampeders ===
Wiggan was selected by the Calgary Stampeders in the fourth round of the 2014 CFL draft with the 34th overall pick after being ranked as high as 14th by the CFL Scouting Bureau in January of that year. He was signed on May 27, 2014. After attending training camp with the Stampeders, Wiggan returned to Queen's University for his final year before re-signing with the team on February 18. 2015. He transitioned from a defensive end into the role of defensive tackle for his first season. He made his CFL debut in the first week game against the Hamilton Tiger-Cats. In his first three seasons in Calgary, Wiggan played in 46 games accumulating 44 defensive tackles, seven sacks, four special teams tackles and one forced fumble.

Following the 2017 season, Wiggan and the Stamps agreed to a two-year contract extension. In 2018, he won his first Grey Cup championship after the Stampeders defeated the Ottawa Redblacks in the 106th Grey Cup game. He became a free agent upon the expiry of his contract on February 13, 2024.

=== Montreal Alouettes ===
On February 13, 2024, it was announced that Wiggan had signed with the Montreal Alouettes. He played in all 18 regular season games in 2024 where he had 17 defensive tackles and two sacks. He announced his retirement shortly after the end of the season on November 30, 2024.
