= Quinn Smith =

Canadian gridiron football player (born 1991)

No. 90, 69
- Position: Offensive lineman

Personal information
- Born: September 19, 1991 (age 35); Scarborough, Ontario, Canada
- Listed height: 6 ft 2 in (1.88 m)
- Listed weight: 300 lb (136 kg)

Career information
- High school: Birchmount Park
- University: Concordia
- CFL draft: 2014: 1st round, 7th overall pick

Career history
- 2014–2018: Calgary Stampeders
- 2021: Toronto Argonauts*
- * Offseason or practice squad member only

Awards and highlights
- 2× Grey Cup champion (2014, 2018)
- Stats at CFL.ca

Quinn Smith (born September 19, 1991) is a Canadian former professional football offensive lineman. Prior to being drafted into the Canadian Football League (CFL), he played Canadian Interuniversity Sport (CIS) football for the Concordia Stingers.

== University career ==
In 2013, his final year at Concordia, Smith played offensive guard in addition to playing his usual defensive tackle. He was named the Stingers' 2013 football MVP and top defensive lineman by the team.

== Professional career ==
=== Calgary Stampeders ===
Smith impressed the scouts with at the 2014 CFL Combine in March. He had not been ranked on the CFL Scouting Bureau's winter scouting report, but he was listed as the number 4 prospect after the combine.

Smith was selected in the first round of the 2014 CFL draft, seventh overall, by the Stampeders, and was later signed to their roster. In his first three seasons in the CFL Smith was primarily utilized as a rotational player on the defensive line. He appeared in 38 games, contributing 26 tackles and eight quarterback sacks. In September 2016 he was suspended for violating the leagues drug policy after testing positive for a banned substance (Methandienone). Following the 2016 CFL season he was re-signed by the Stampeders in January 2017; about a month before becoming a free agent. He played in two regular season games in 2017 while spending the rest of the year on the injured list, practice roster, and reserve roster. In 2018, he spent all but one regular season game on the injured list and was on the practice roster for the other. He was on the reserve roster when the Stampeders won the 106th Grey Cup. He became a free agent when his contract expired on February 12, 2019.

=== Toronto Argonauts ===
On June 30, 2021, Smith signed with the Toronto Argonauts. He was released near the end of training camp on July 28, 2021.
