= Anthony Coombs (Canadian football) =

Canadian football player (born 1992)

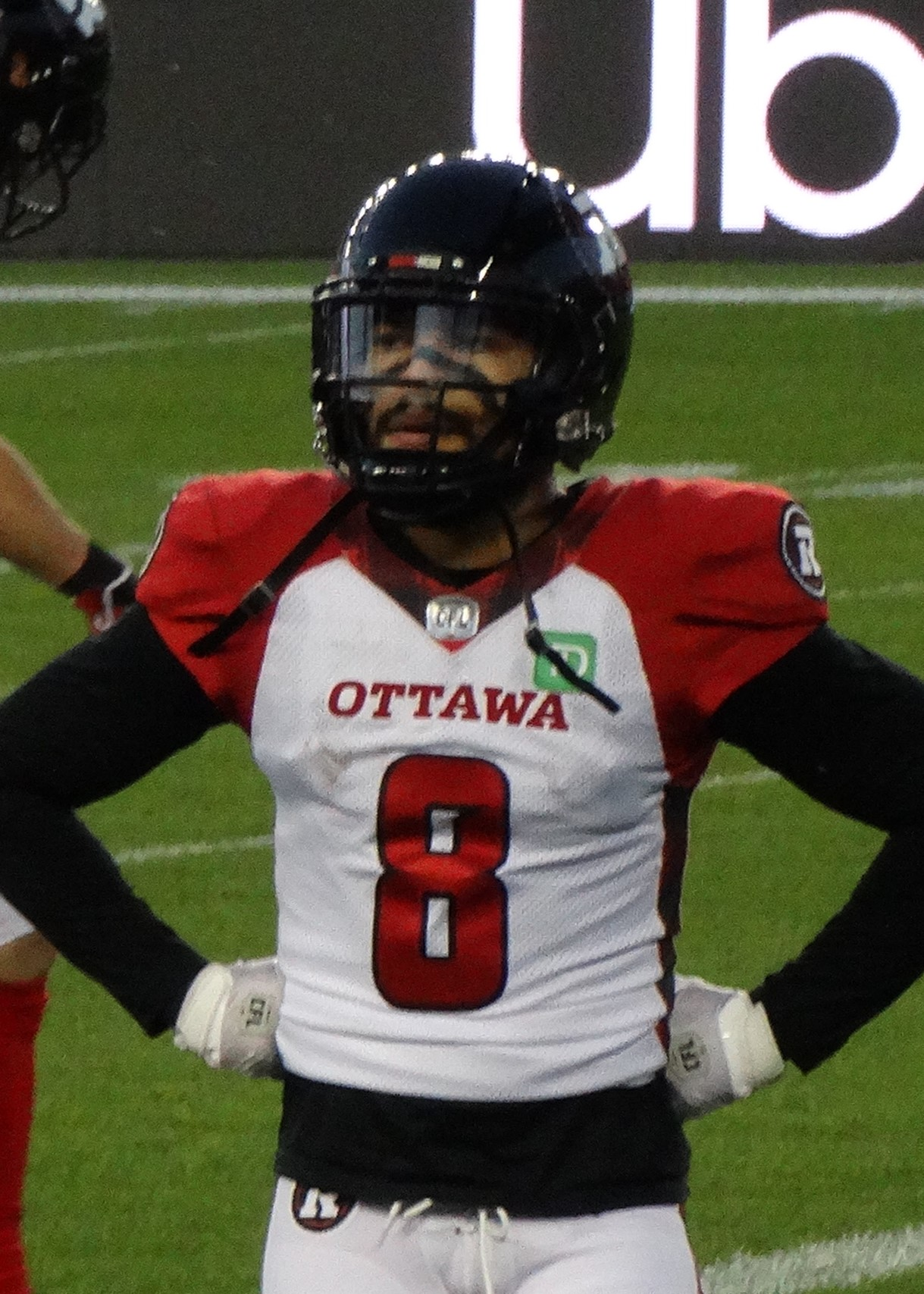
- Coombs with the Ottawa Redblacks in 2021

Profile
- Position: Wide receiver

Personal information
- Born: October 26, 1992 (age 34); Winnipeg, Manitoba, Canada
- Listed height: 5 ft 9 in (1.75 m)
- Listed weight: 190 lb (86 kg)

Career information
- University: Manitoba Bisons
- CFL draft: 2014: 1st round, 3rd overall pick

Career history
- 2014–2018: Toronto Argonauts
- 2019: Hamilton Tiger-Cats
- 2020–2021: Ottawa Redblacks

Awards and highlights
- Grey Cup champion (2017)
- Stats at CFL.ca

Anthony Coombs (born October 26, 1992) is a Canadian former professional football wide receiver who played in the Canadian Football League (CFL). He played Canadian Interuniversity Sport (CIS) football with the Manitoba Bisons.

== Professional career ==
=== Toronto Argonauts ===
In the CFL's Amateur Scouting Bureau final rankings, Coombs was ranked eighth best of the players eligible in the 2014 CFL draft. He was then drafted third overall by the Toronto Argonauts and signed with the team on May 27, 2014.

In his first three seasons, Coombs was mostly used as a backup or rotational player behind starting tailback Curtis Steele and later Brandon Whitaker.

In Coombs' fourth season in the league, and first under new head coach Marc Trestman, his role in the offense expanded greatly; averaging 5.2 receptions per game. On August 22, mid-way through the season, it was announced that Coombs would have to undergo shoulder surgery. At the time, Trestman said he was hopeful Coombs could return to action before the end of the season. Indeed he did, as he played in the last game of the regular season on November 4, 2017, recording two catches for 31 yards. In the East Final against the Saskatchewan Roughriders, Coombs had a team-leading nine receptions for 77 yards and one carry for three yards. He dressed in the 105th Grey Cup game, but did not record any stats as his team went on to win the Grey Cup championship over the Calgary Stampeders.

Coombs began the 2018 Toronto Argonauts season on the one-game injured list before being transferred to the six-game injured list as he recovered from an ankle injury. Coombs played in only two games in 2018 as he struggled to stay healthy. Following the season, he was re-signed by the Argos to a one-year contract. However, he was released during 2019 training camp on June 5, 2019.

=== Hamilton Tiger-Cats ===
On June 19, 2019, Coombs signed a practice roster agreement with the Hamilton Tiger-Cats. He played in 16 regular season games where he rushed 37 times for 158 yards and had 20 receptions 156 yards and two touchdowns.

=== Ottawa Redblacks ===
Upon entering free agency, Coombs signed with the Ottawa Redblacks on February 11, 2020. However, he did not play in 2020 due to the cancellation of the 2020 CFL season and re-signed with the Redblacks on January 26, 2021. In 2021, Coombs played in 11 games where he had 28 receptions for 247 yards. He became a free agent upon the expiry of his contract on February 8, 2022.
