= Devon Bailey =

Canadian football player (born 1991)

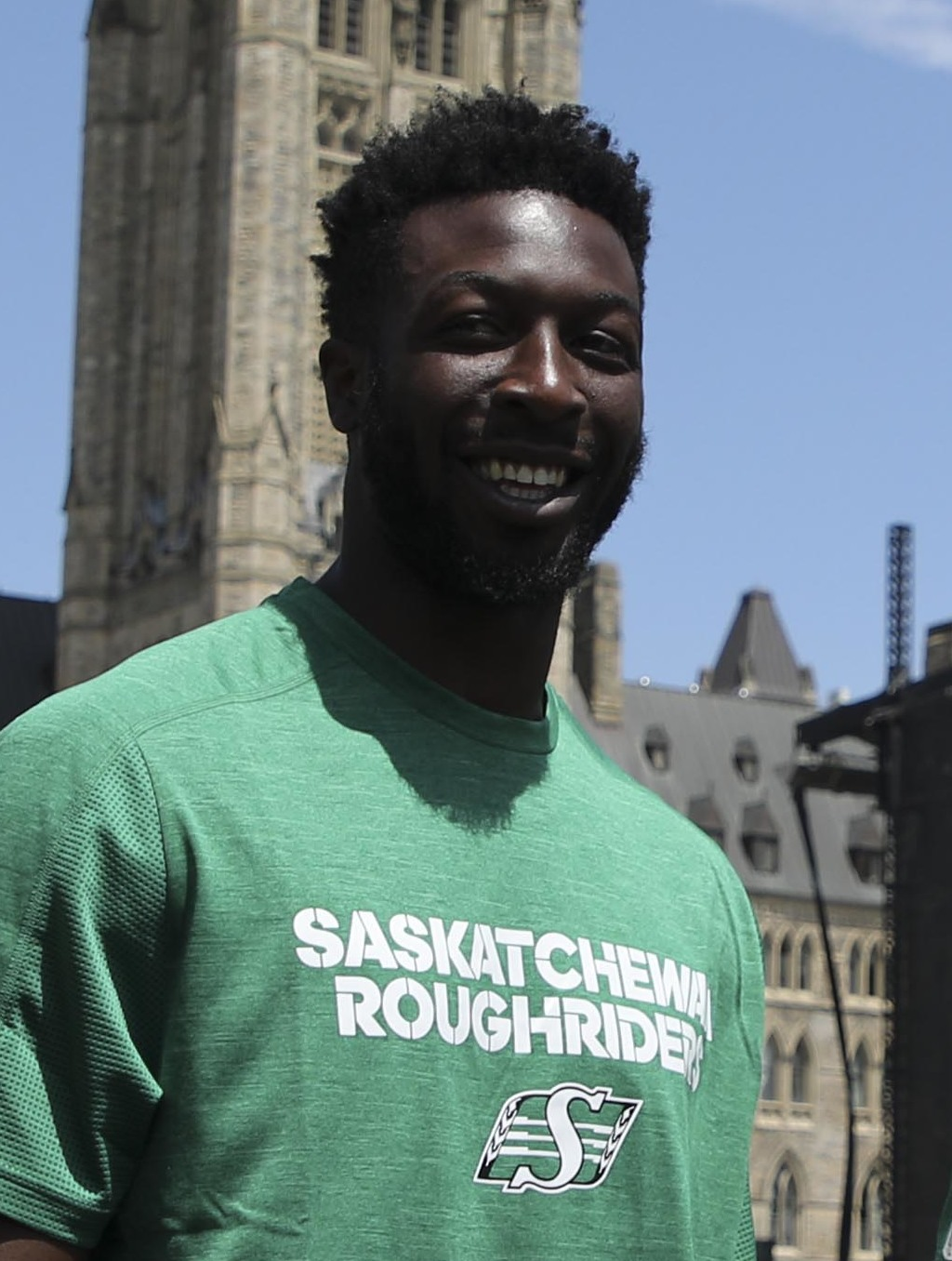
- Bailey with the Saskatchewan Roughriders in 2018

Profile
- Position: Wide receiver

Personal information
- Born: September 28, 1991 (age 35); Mississauga, Ontario, Canada
- Listed height: 6 ft 5 in (1.96 m)
- Listed weight: 200 lb (91 kg)

Career information
- High school: Our Lady of Mount Carmel
- University: St. Francis Xavier
- CFL draft: 2014: 1st round, 6th overall pick

Career history
- 2014–2016: Edmonton Eskimos
- 2017: Montreal Alouettes*
- 2017–2018: Saskatchewan Roughriders
- 2020–2021: BC Lions*
- * Offseason or practice squad member only

Awards and highlights
- Grey Cup champion (2015)
- Stats at CFL.ca

Devon Bailey (born September 28, 1991) is a Canadian former professional football wide receiver who played in the Canadian Football League (CFL). He was drafted by the Edmonton Eskimos with the sixth overall pick of the 2014 CFL draft. He played CIS football at St. Francis Xavier University and attended Our Lady of Mount Carmel Secondary School in Mississauga, Ontario.

== University career ==
Bailey played for the St. Francis Xavier X-Men from 2010 to 2013. He recorded 87 receptions for 1,160 yards and six touchdowns in his career.

== Professional career ==
=== Edmonton Eskimos ===
Edmonton Eskimos drafted Bailey in the first round of the 2014 CFL draft. He was ranked No. 5 in the final CFL Scouting Bureau rankings in April 2014. He signed with the Eskimos on May 31, 2014. In his rookie season with the Eskimos, Bailey recorded 17 catches for a total of 219 yards.

Bailey recorded his first CFL touchdown on August 21, 2015 against the Hamilton Tiger Cats. The Eskimos won the 103rd Grey Cup against the Ottawa Redblacks on November 29, 2015.

In the 2016 CFL season, Bailey recorded two receptions for 83 yards and a touchdown.

=== Montreal Alouettes ===
On April 20, 2017, the Montreal Alouettes signed Bailey to a one-year contract worth an estimated $84,000. He was released by the Alouettes on June 18, 2017.

=== Saskatchewan Roughriders ===
On August 2, 2017, Bailey was signed by the Saskatchewan Roughriders.

=== BC Lions ===
On February 19, 2020, it was announced that Bailey had signed with the BC Lions to a one-year contract. He was released on March 19, 2021.
