= Rolly Lumbala =

Canadian gridiron football player (born 1986)

Profile
- Position: Fullback

Personal information
- Born: January 30, 1986 (age 40); Libreville, Gabon
- Listed height: 6 ft 2 in (1.88 m)
- Listed weight: 238 lb (108 kg)

Career information
- College: Idaho
- CFL draft: 2008: 2nd round, 9th overall pick

Career history
- BC Lions (2008–2018); Miami Dolphins (2010)*
- * Offseason or practice squad member only

Awards and highlights
- Grey Cup champion (2011)

Career CFL statistics
- Rushing yards: 166
- Rushing average: 4
- Receptions: 58
- Receiving yards: 466
- Total touchdowns: 7
- Stats at CFL.ca

Rolly Lumbala (born January 30, 1986) is a former professional Canadian football fullback who played for the BC Lions of the Canadian Football League (CFL). He was also a member of the Miami Dolphins of the National Football League. He was drafted by the Lions in the second round of the 2008 CFL draft. He played college football at Idaho.

He signed with the Dolphins on January 12, 2010, and was released on September 4, 2010.
