= Dean Valli =

Canadian football player (born 1983)

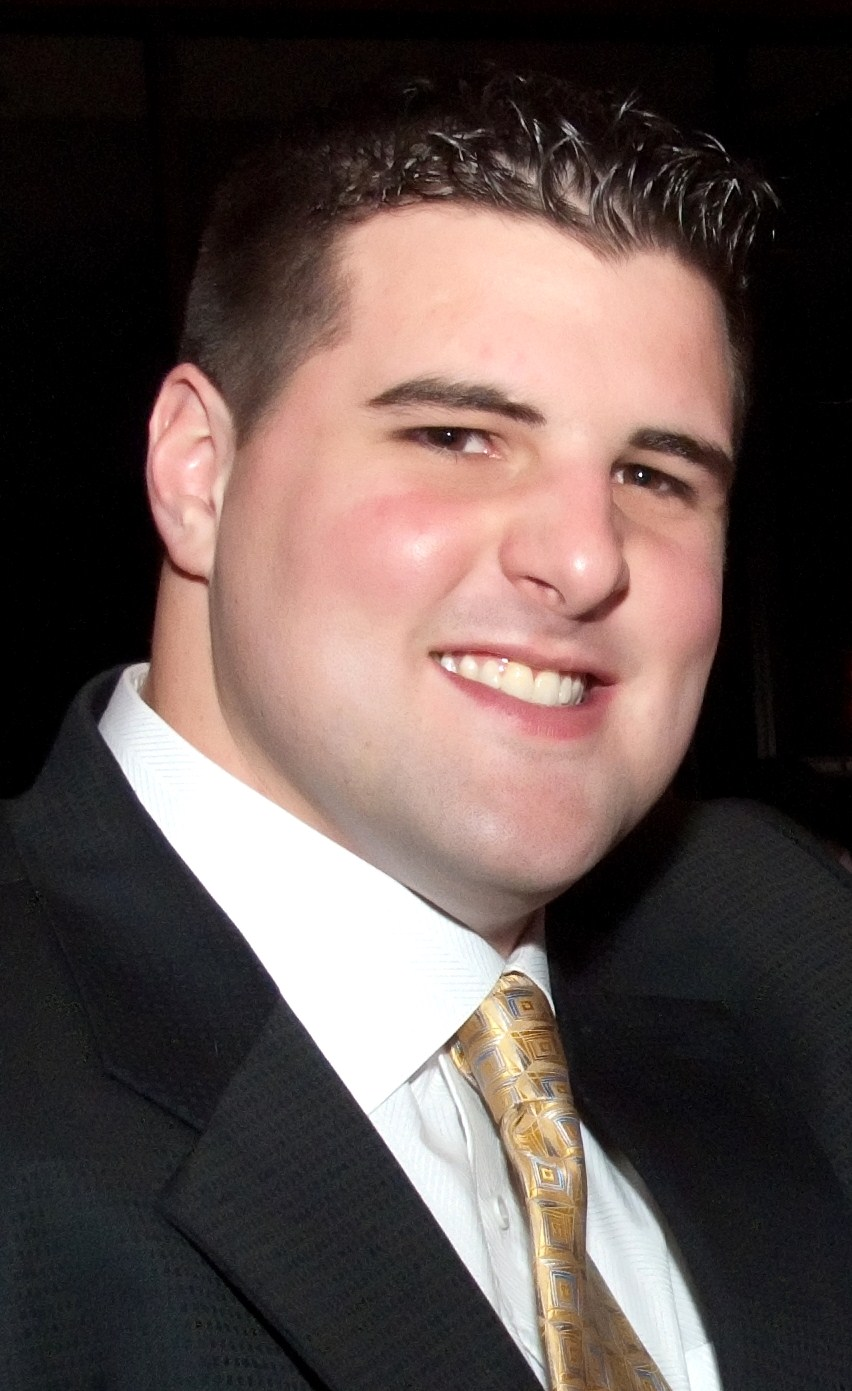
- Valli at the Orange Helmet Awards Dinner, 2009

No. 54
- Position: Centre

Personal information
- Born: October 5, 1983 (age 43); North Vancouver, British Columbia, Canada
- Listed height: 6 ft 5 in (1.96 m)
- Listed weight: 300 lb (136 kg)

Career information
- University: Simon Fraser
- CFL draft: 2006: 1st round, 6th overall pick

Career history
- 2006–2015: BC Lions

Awards and highlights
- 2× Grey Cup champion (2006, 2011)
- Stats at CFL.ca

Dean Valli (born October 5, 1983) is a Canadian former professional football offensive lineman who played for the BC Lions of the Canadian Football League (CFL). Valli attended Simon Fraser University and played for their football team, the Simon Fraser Clan. He played four full seasons with the Clan from 2002 to 2005. Dean graduated with a Bachelor of Arts from Simon Fraser University in 2006. In 2005, Valli was named to the Canada West Universities Athletic Association all-star team. He also represented SFU at the 2005 East West Bowl held in Waterloo, Ontario. Valli was selected in the 1st round, 6th overall, by the Lions in the 2006 CFL draft. 2006 was his first year playing professional football.

Valli retired on February 4, 2016, after 10 seasons with the club.
