= David Ménard =

Canadian football player (born 1990)

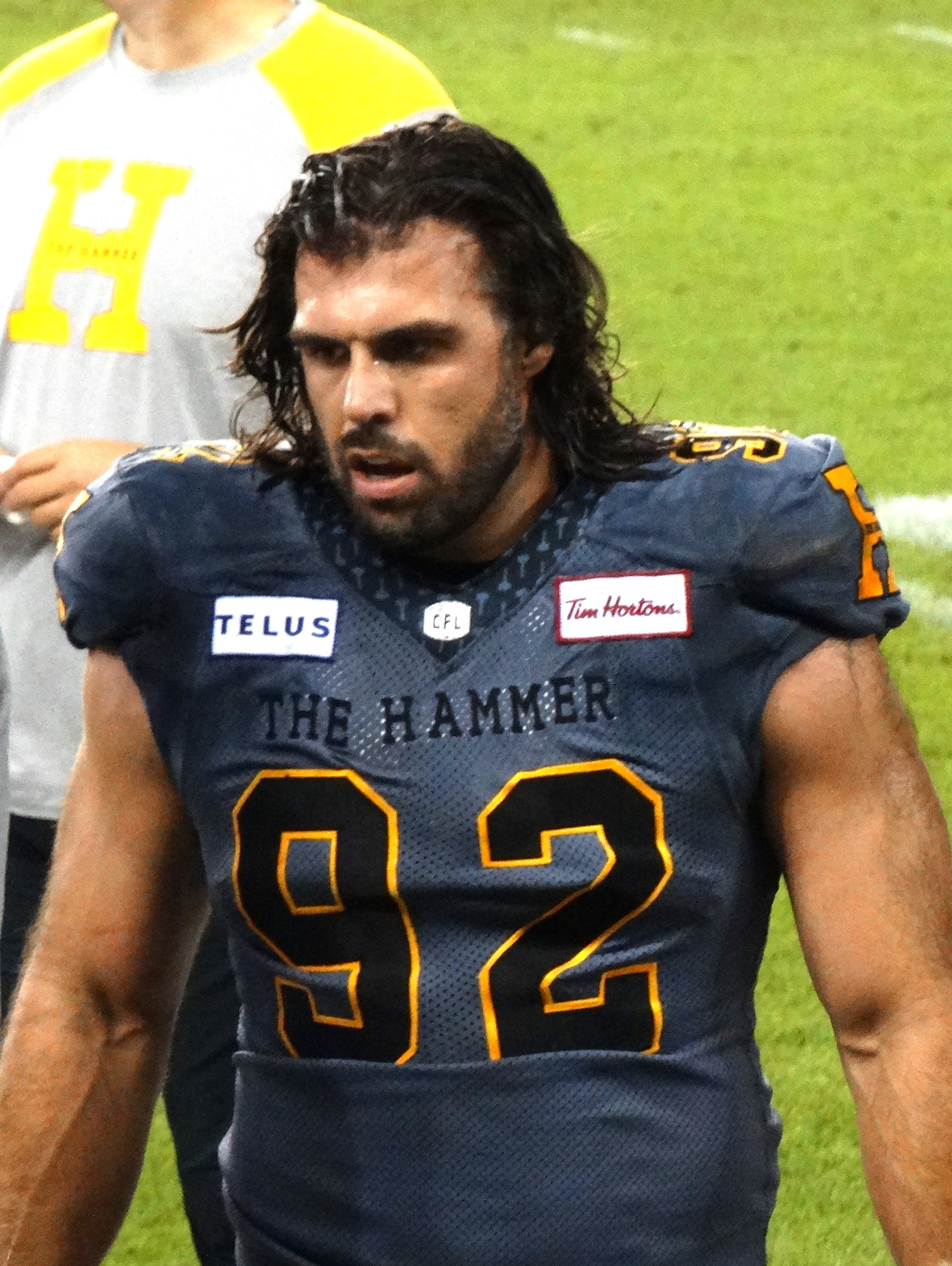
- Ménard with the Hamilton Tiger-Cats in 2024

No. 92
- Position: Defensive lineman

Personal information
- Born: July 15, 1990 (age 36); Chicoutimi, Quebec, Canada
- Listed height: 6 ft 1 in (1.85 m)
- Listed weight: 265 lb (120 kg)

Career information
- University: Montreal
- CFL draft: 2014: 4th round, 32nd overall pick

Career history
- 2014–2019: BC Lions
- 2020–2021: Montreal Alouettes
- 2022–2023: BC Lions
- 2024: Hamilton Tiger-Cats

Awards and highlights
- Lew Hayman Trophy (2021); CFL East All-Star (2021)
- Stats at CFL.ca

David Ménard (born July 15, 1990) is a Canadian professional football defensive lineman.

== University career ==
Ménard played CIS football with the Montreal Carabins from 2010 to 2013. He was named the QUFL Rookie of the Year in 2010.

== Professional career ==
=== BC Lions (first stint) ===
Ménard was ranked as the 13th best player in the Canadian Football League's Amateur Scouting Bureau final rankings for players eligible in the 2014 CFL draft. He was then selected in the fourth round and 32nd overall by the BC Lions in the draft and signed with the team on May 27, 2014. He played for the Lions for six seasons and played in 94 regular season games where he had 63 defensive tackles, 17 sacks, and three forced fumbles.

=== Montreal Alouettes ===
Upon entering free agency, Ménard signed with the Montreal Alouettes on February 12, 2020. However, he did not play in 2020 due to the cancellation of the 2020 CFL season and he re-signed with the Alouettes for the 2021 season on December 15, 2020. Ménard played in all 14 regular season games and led the East Division with eight sacks, despite only starting in one game, and also had 18 defensive tackles and two forced fumbles. He was then named an East Division All-Star and won the Lew Hayman Trophy as the East Division's Most Outstanding Canadian. He became a free agent when his contract expired on February 8, 2022.

=== BC Lions (second stint) ===
On February 8, 2022, it was announced that Ménard had re-signed with the Lions. He played in 18 regular season games where he recorded a career-high nine sacks along with 17 defensive tackles and one forced fumble. In 2023, Ménard again played in all 18 regular season games and had 14 defensive tackles and three sacks. Following the Lions signing of fellow National defensive lineman Christian Covington, Ménard was released on May 2, 2024.

=== Hamilton Tiger-Cats ===
On May 27, 2024, it was announced that Ménard had signed with the Hamilton Tiger-Cats.
