= Casey Chin =

Canadian football player (born 1992)

Profile
- Positions: Linebacker, Long snapper

Personal information
- Born: August 27, 1992 (age 34); Port Moody, British Columbia
- Listed height: 5 ft 10 in (1.78 m)
- Listed weight: 215 lb (98 kg)

Career information
- University: Simon Fraser
- CFL draft: 2014: 3rd round, 27th overall pick

Career history
- 2014–2015: BC Lions
- 2016: Edmonton Eskimos
- Stats at CFL.ca

Casey Chin (born August 27, 1992) is a Canadian former professional football linebacker. He was drafted 27th overall in the 2014 CFL draft by the BC Lions and signed with the club on May 27, 2014. He was ranked as the 12th best player in the Canadian Football League's Amateur Scouting Bureau final rankings for players eligible in the 2014 CFL Draft. He played college football with the Simon Fraser Clan. He went to École des Pionniers de Maillardville in Port Coquitlam for his Middle School and New Westminster Secondary for his High School.
