= Tony Washington (offensive lineman) =

American gridiron football player (born 1986)

Profile
- Position: Offensive lineman

Personal information
- Born: February 17, 1986 (age 40); New Orleans, Louisiana, U.S.
- Listed height: 6 ft 7 in (2.01 m)
- Listed weight: 318 lb (144 kg)

Career information
- High school: Alcée Fortier
- College: Abilene Christian

Career history
- 2010–2011: Dallas Vigilantes
- 2011: Calgary Stampeders
- 2012: Allen Wranglers
- 2012–2013: Toronto Argonauts
- 2014–2017: Edmonton Eskimos
- 2017–2018: Hamilton Tiger-Cats
- 2018–2021: Montreal Alouettes
- 2022: Edmonton Elks

Awards and highlights
- 2× Grey Cup champion (2012, 2015)
- Stats at CFL.ca

Tony Washington (born February 17, 1986) is an American former professional football offensive tackle who played in the Canadian Football League (CFL).

== Early life ==
On May 9, 2003, Washington pleaded guilty to prohibitive sexual conduct after having consensual sex with his sister, Caylen. At the time, he was 16, and she was 15. Washington was processed as an adult and put in jail; he was released after one month. As a result of the charge, he is a registered sex offender.

Washington played one year of high school football as a junior while living in New Orleans. That year, he was awarded with all-league honors as a member of the Alcée Fortier High School football team. His family moved to Texas after Hurricane Katrina struck New Orleans.

== College career ==
After graduating from high school, Washington did not plan to attend college. He decided to go to college, however, after a car salesman suggested he continue his football career. He then enrolled at Trinity Valley Community College in Athens, Texas. While at Trinity Valley, Washington was named to the 2007 all-Southwest Junior College Football Conference first team.

Washington then attended Abilene Christian University, playing on the football team for two years and winning the LSC championship in 2008. Both years he was voted the Lone Star Conference Offensive Lineman of the Year.

== Professional career ==
Though Washington excelled at the NFL Scouting Combine workouts he was undrafted. He was very agile and quick for a lineman, running the 40-yard dash in 5.09 seconds. After leaving school, Washington played for the Dallas Vigilantes of the Arena Football League (AFL) for two years before signing with the Calgary Stampeders in 2011. He was signed by the Toronto Argonauts of the Canadian Football League on July 4, 2012, where he won his first Grey Cup.

Washington was traded to the Edmonton Eskimos from the Argos in May 2014. In his first three seasons in Edmonton he started in 48 games for the club, including the 2015 Grey Cup championship victory. Following the 2016 season Washington signed a contract extension with the Eskimos. He was released by Edmonton on August 7, 2017, and was immediately signed by the Hamilton Tiger-Cats.

On July 22, 2018, Washington was traded with teammate Landon Rice to the Montreal Alouettes in the blockbuster Johnny Manziel deal.

Washington re-signed with the Alouettes on a one-year contract extension on December 16, 2020.

The Edmonton Elks announced that they had traded for Washington on January 14, 2022. He was released on December 1, 2022.
