= T-Dre Player =

Canadian football player (born 1992)

No. 68
- Position: Guard

Personal information
- Born: February 4, 1992 (age 34); Winnipeg, Manitoba, Canada
- Listed height: 6 ft 6 in (1.98 m)
- Listed weight: 315 lb (143 kg)

Career information
- High school: Cedar Hill (Cedar Hill, Texas)
- College: Northwestern State
- CFL draft: 2014: 2nd round, 12th overall pick

Career history
- 2014–2015: BC Lions
- 2016: Winnipeg Blue Bombers*
- 2016: Saskatchewan Roughriders*
- * Offseason or practice squad member only
- Stats at CFL.ca

Tchissakid Dre Player (born February 4, 1992) is a Canadian former professional football offensive lineman who played for the BC Lions of the Canadian Football League (CFL). He was selected by the BC Lions in the second round of the 2014 CFL draft after playing college football at Northwestern State University.

== Early life ==
Tchissakid Dre Player was born on February 4, 1992, in Winnipeg, Manitoba. His dad, Paul Player, was from Oklahoma and played college basketball at the University of Winnipeg. His mother, Corinne Fontaine, is from the Sagkeeng First Nation.

Player and his family moved to Texas when he was nine years old so he could have more athletic opportunities. He attended Cedar Hill High School in Cedar Hill, Texas. He played college football for the Northwestern State Demons of Northwestern State University from 2010 to 2013.

== Professional career ==
Player was drafted by the BC Lions with the twelfth pick in the 2014 CFL draft. He scored a receiving touchdown against the Edmonton Eskimos on June 28, 2014 He was released by the Lions on June 18, 2016.

Player was signed to the Winnipeg Blue Bombers' practice roster on July 4, 2016. He was released by the team on July 17, 2016.

Player was signed to the Saskatchewan Roughriders' practice roster in July 2016. He was released by the team on August 9, 2016.
