= Cameron Thorn =

Canadian football player (born 1990)

Profile
- Position: Offensive lineman

Personal information
- Born: April 16, 1990 (age 36); Midhurst, Ontario, Canada
- Listed height: 6 ft 4 in (1.93 m)
- Listed weight: 295 lb (134 kg)

Career information
- University: Guelph
- CFL draft: 2013: 7th round, 58th overall pick

Career history
- 2013–2015: BC Lions
- 2016–2017: Calgary Stampeders
- Stats at CFL.ca

Cameron Thorn (born April 16, 1990) is a Canadian former professional football offensive lineman who played for the BC Lions and Calgary Stampeders of the Canadian Football League (CFL). He was selected by the Lions in the seventh round, with the 58th overall pick, of the 2013 CFL draft and signed with the team on May 27, 2013. He was released by the Lions on May 26, 2016, and signed with the Stampeders on June 8, 2016. He played CIS football with the Guelph Gryphons.
