= 2013 BC Lions season =

Canadian football team season

- General manager: Wally Buono
- Head coach: Mike Benevides
- Home stadium: BC Place Stadium

Results
- Record: 11–7
- Division place: 3rd, West
- Playoffs: Lost West Semi-Final
- Team MOP: Adam Bighill
- Team MOC: Andrew Harris
- Team MOR: Seydou Junior Haidara

Uniform

The 2013 BC Lions season was the 56th season for the team in the Canadian Football League (CFL) and their 60th overall. On September 27, the Lions defeated the Winnipeg Blue Bombers to clinch a playoff spot for the 17th straight season, tying the mark for the third longest playoff streak in CFL history. The Lions finished the season in third place in the West Division with an 11–7 record, but lost to the Saskatchewan Roughriders in the West Semi-Final.

== Offseason ==
=== Free agents ===
Position	Player	2013 team	Date signed	Notes
LB	Solomon Elimimian	BC Lions	Feb. 15, 2013	
SB	Shawn Gore	BC Lions	Jan. 31, 2013	
OL	Jon Hameister-Ries			
DB	Cauchy Muamba	Winnipeg Blue Bombers	Feb. 19, 2013	
OL	Jesse Newman			
OL	Jovan Olafioye	BC Lions	Feb. 15, 2013	
QB	Mike Reilly	Edmonton Eskimos	Jan. 31, 2013	Traded to EDM
DB	James Yurichuk	Toronto Argonauts	Feb. 15, 2013	

=== CFL draft ===
The 2013 CFL draft took place on May 6, 2013. The Lions had seven selections in the draft, including three positions higher in rounds two and three after completing trades with Edmonton.

Round	Pick	Player	Position	School/club team
1	6	Hunter Steward	OL	Liberty
2	12	Seydou Junior Haidara	WR	Laval
3	21	Boseko Lokombo	LB	Oregon
4	33	Matt McGarva	DB	Windsor
5	42	Matthew Albright	OL	Saint Mary's
6	50	Matt Walker	DB	British Columbia
7	58	Cameron Thorn	DL	Guelph

== Preseason ==
Week	Date	Opponent	Score	Result	Attendance	Record
A	Fri, June 14	at Calgary Stampeders	29–27	Win	26,328	1–0
B	Fri, June 21	vs. Edmonton Eskimos	27–22	Loss	26,733	1–1

# Games played with white uniforms.

== Regular season ==
=== Standings ===
West Division
Team	GP	W	L	T	PF	PA	Pts	
Calgary Stampeders	18	14	4	0	549	413	28	Details
Saskatchewan Roughriders	18	11	7	0	519	398	22	Details
BC Lions	18	11	7	0	504	461	22	Details
Edmonton Eskimos	18	4	14	0	421	519	8	Details

=== Schedule ===
Week	Date	Opponent	Score	Result	Attendance	Record
1	Fri, June 28	at Calgary Stampeders	44–32	Loss	26,625	0–1
2	Thur, July 4	vs. Toronto Argonauts	24–16	Win	25,255	1–1
3	Sat, July 13	at Edmonton Eskimos	17–3	Win	31,310	2–1
4	Sat, July 20	vs. Edmonton Eskimos	31–21	Win	26,623	3–1
5	Tue, July 30	at Toronto Argonauts	38–12	Loss	20,064	3–2
6	Mon, Aug 5	vs. Winnipeg Blue Bombers	27–20	Win	26,856	4–2
7	Bye					4–2
8	Sat, Aug 17	vs. Calgary Stampeders	26–22	Win	29,201	5–2
9	Thur, Aug 22	at Montreal Alouettes	39–38	Loss	22,456	5–3
10	Fri, Aug 30	vs. Hamilton Tiger-Cats	29–26	Win	30,564	6–3
11	Sat, Sept 7	at Hamilton Tiger-Cats	37–29	Loss	13,101	6–4
12	Sun, Sept 15	vs. Montreal Alouettes	36–14	Win	27,213	7–4
13	Sun, Sept 22	at Saskatchewan Roughriders	24–22	Win	39,373	8–4
14	Fri, Sept 27	at Winnipeg Blue Bombers	53–17	Win	29,457	9–4
15	Fri, Oct 4	vs. Saskatchewan Roughriders	31–17	Loss	37,312	9–5
16	Fri, Oct 11	at Calgary Stampeders	40–26	Loss	26,115	9–6
17	Sat, Oct 19	at Saskatchewan Roughriders	35–14	Loss	34,956	9–7
18	Fri, Oct 25	vs. Edmonton Eskimos	43–29	Win	24,545	10–7
19	Fri, Nov 1	vs. Calgary Stampeders	26–7	Win	27,228	11–7

# Games played with colour uniforms.
# Games played with white uniforms.
# Games played with alternate uniforms.

== Team ==
=== Roster ===
2013 BC Lions final roster
Quarterbacks: 16 Thomas DeMarco; 14 Travis Lulay; 11 Buck Pierce; Running backs: 40 Tim Cronk; 33 Andrew Harris; 10 Stefan Logan; 46 Rolly Lumbala; Receivers: 84 Emmanuel Arceneaux; 85 Shawn Gore; 80 S. J. Haidara; 87 Marco Iannuzzi; 19 Paris Jackson; 17 Nick Moore; 86 Courtney Taylor; 8 Korey Williams	Offensive linemen: 53 Matthew Albright G/T; 65 Ben Archibald T; 68 Patrick Kabongo G; 58 Steve Myddelton G; 59 Matt Norman C; 63 Jovan Olafioye T; 54 Dean Valli G/C; Defensive linemen: 91 Brandon Jordan DE; 94 Khreem Smith DE; 79 Eric Taylor DT; 99 Jabar Westerman DT; 98 Jermaine Reid DT; 95 Chris Wilson DE	Linebackers: 45 Jason Arakgi; 44 Adam Bighill; 56 Solomon Elimimian; 28 Korey Jones; 47 Kyle Jones; Defensive backs: 6 Josh Bell; 27 J. R. LaRose; 31 Dante Marsh; 20 Keynan Parker; 26 Cord Parks; 21 Ryan Phillips; 2 Lin-J Shell; Special teams: 39 Jordan Matechuk LS; 4 Paul McCallum K/P	Reserve roster: 24 Korey Banks DB; 7 Tim Brown RB; 87 Akeem Foster WR; 42 Anton McKenzie LB; 9 Keron Williams DE/DT; Practice roster: 60 Nyere Aumaitre T; 96 Adrian Awasom DT; 13 Cam Chism DB; 49 Steven Doege DE; 67 Kyle Fischer T; 90 Andrew Marshall DE; 10 Steven Shott K/P; 35 Isi Sofele RB; 92 Myles Wade DT; 37 Ronnie Yell DB	Injured list: 66 Adam Baboulas G; 12 Joey Elliott QB; 50 Kirby Fabien G; 25 Stu Foord RB; 1 Chris Hart QB; 82 Ernest Jackson WR; 3 Matt McGarva DB; 64 Angus Reid C; Suspended list: Levi Horn T; Italics indicate American players. Roster updated 2026-04-28; Depth chart • Transactions

=== Coaching staff ===
2013 BC Lions staff
Front office: Owner – David Braley; President and CEO – Dennis Skulsky; General Manager and Vice President of Football Operations – Wally Buono; Director of Player Personnel – Roy Shivers; Player Personnel Coordinator and Assistant to GM – Neil McEvoy; Head coaches: Head Coach – Mike Benevides; Offensive coaches: Offensive Coordinator and Receivers – Jacques Chapdelaine; Quarterbacks – Jarious Jackson; Running backs – Kelly Bates; Offensive line – Dan Dorazio	Defensive coaches: Defensive Coordinator – Rich Stubler; Defensive line – Carl Hairston; Defensive backs – Mark Washington; Special teams coaches: Special Teams Coordinator – Chuck McMann; Strength and conditioning: Strength and Conditioning Trainer – Chris Boyko; → Coaching staff

== Playoffs ==
=== Schedule ===
Week	Game	Date	Time	Opponent	Score	Result	Attendance
20	West Semi-Final	Nov 10	1:30 PM PST	at Saskatchewan Roughriders	29–25	Loss	30,942

# Games played with white uniforms.

=== West Semi-Final ===
BC at Saskatchewan

Team	1	2	3	4	Total
Lions	0	17	8	0	25
• Roughriders	3	13	0	13	29

- Date: November 10
- Location: Mosaic Stadium at Taylor Field
  Regina, SK
- Game start: 1:30 PM PST
- Game attendance: 30,942
- Game weather: Clear; −11 °C; wind 19 km/h
- Referee: Andre Proulx
- TV announcers (TSN): Rod Black (play by play), Duane Forde (color), Farhan Lalji (sideline)
