= Third jersey =

Jersey worn as an alternative to a home uniform or an away uniform during games

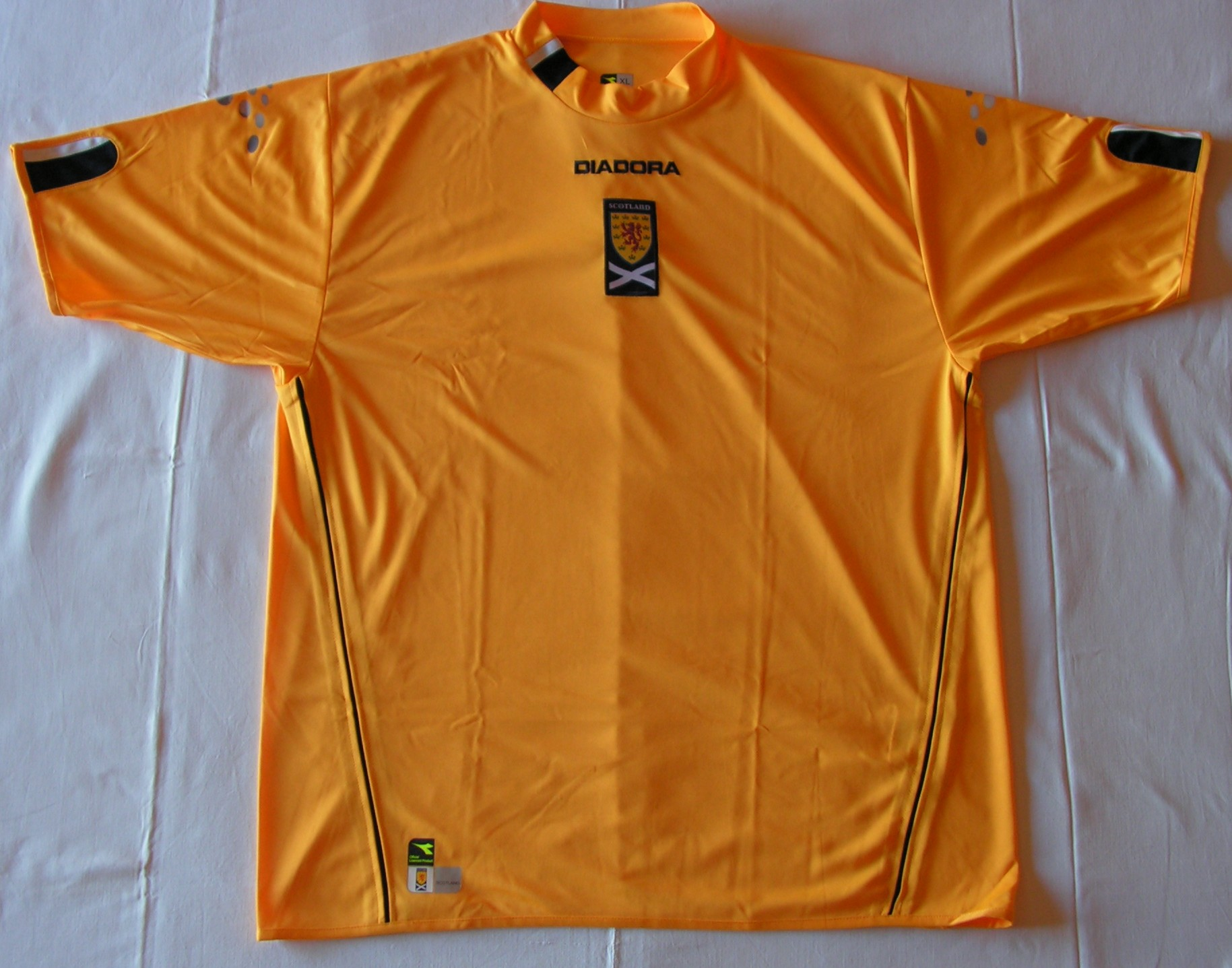
A Scotland national football team orange third jersey.

A third jersey, alternative jersey, third kit, third sweater or alternative uniform is a team jersey or uniform that a sports team can wear instead of its home outfit or its away outfit during games, often when the colors of two competing teams' other uniforms are too similar to contrast easily.

Alternative jerseys are a lucrative means for professional sports organizations to generate revenue, by sales to fans. Of North American sports leagues, the National Football League (gridiron football) generates $1.2 billion annually in jersey sales, with the National Basketball Association second, selling $900 million annually. Another use of the alternative uniform is for identifying with causes. For example, the Central Coast Mariners wear an alternative pink kit on pink ribbon day.

Extra alternative uniforms — such as fourth and fifth kits — are not commonly used, but are sometimes required when teams' other uniforms cause color clashes, their other wears are unavailable to use, or are introduced for commercial purposes. In cases where teams have worn more than three kits in the same season, the extra kits were usually recycled from previous seasons.

Third-choice jerseys or uniforms are used in all five major professional sports leagues in the United States and Canada.

Third kits are commonplace in professional European association football and in some professional European rugby union clubs. Alternative uniforms are common in Australia's two biggest domestic leagues, the Australian Football League (Aussie rules) and National Rugby League (rugby league).

== Background ==
As a general rule in most sports, the home team has the privilege to select its desired color first, and the visiting team must then choose a suitable contrasting color. The "third" jersey should be distinct from the "first" (home) and "second" (away) and thus a visiting team should always have at least one suitable alternative choice. The actual choice may be guided by tradition, but modern sports leagues often impose specific rules, especially in professional leagues.

For home and away jerseys in North America, historical convention has often dictated the colors used by teams in a given league. Teams generally have one jersey which is primarily in a team color, and another jersey which is primarily white (or another light color) and accented with a team color. "White at home" is the convention in baseball (MLB), basketball (NBA, NCAA basketball, and WNBA), minor league professional ice hockey (AHL and ECHL), and college ice hockey. "White while away" is the convention in football (NFL, CFL, NCAA football), major league professional ice hockey (NHL), and professional lacrosse (NLL and MLL). Association football (MLS) does not have a "white at home" or a "white while away" convention.

The NHL (and formerly the NBA) enforces the color/white rule strictly; any NHL team seeking to wear white at home must get express permission from the league office to do so. In minor league hockey, the rules are set in both the AHL and ECHL where the team wears white jerseys at home during one half of the season, then wears the color jerseys during the other half at home, and vice versa on the road. In the NFL, the rules state that the home team has the first choice of color, with the visiting team forced to choose a contrasting color; an exception was Color Rush, in which uniform choices were coordinated by the league itself.

Starting with their uniform contract with Nike that begins with the 2017-2018 season, the NBA has abolished the color/white rule. Instead, each team will designate whether their white uniform, now dubbed the "Association Edition," or their colored uniform, called the "Icon Edition," will be the home uniform, with the other becoming their designated away uniform.

In American sports, throwback jerseys are generally only used for special team games and not for the "third" purpose. In American football a third jersey may be a throwback uniform based on designs the team used in the past. In association football, meanwhile, it is more commonly a radically different design.

== American football ==
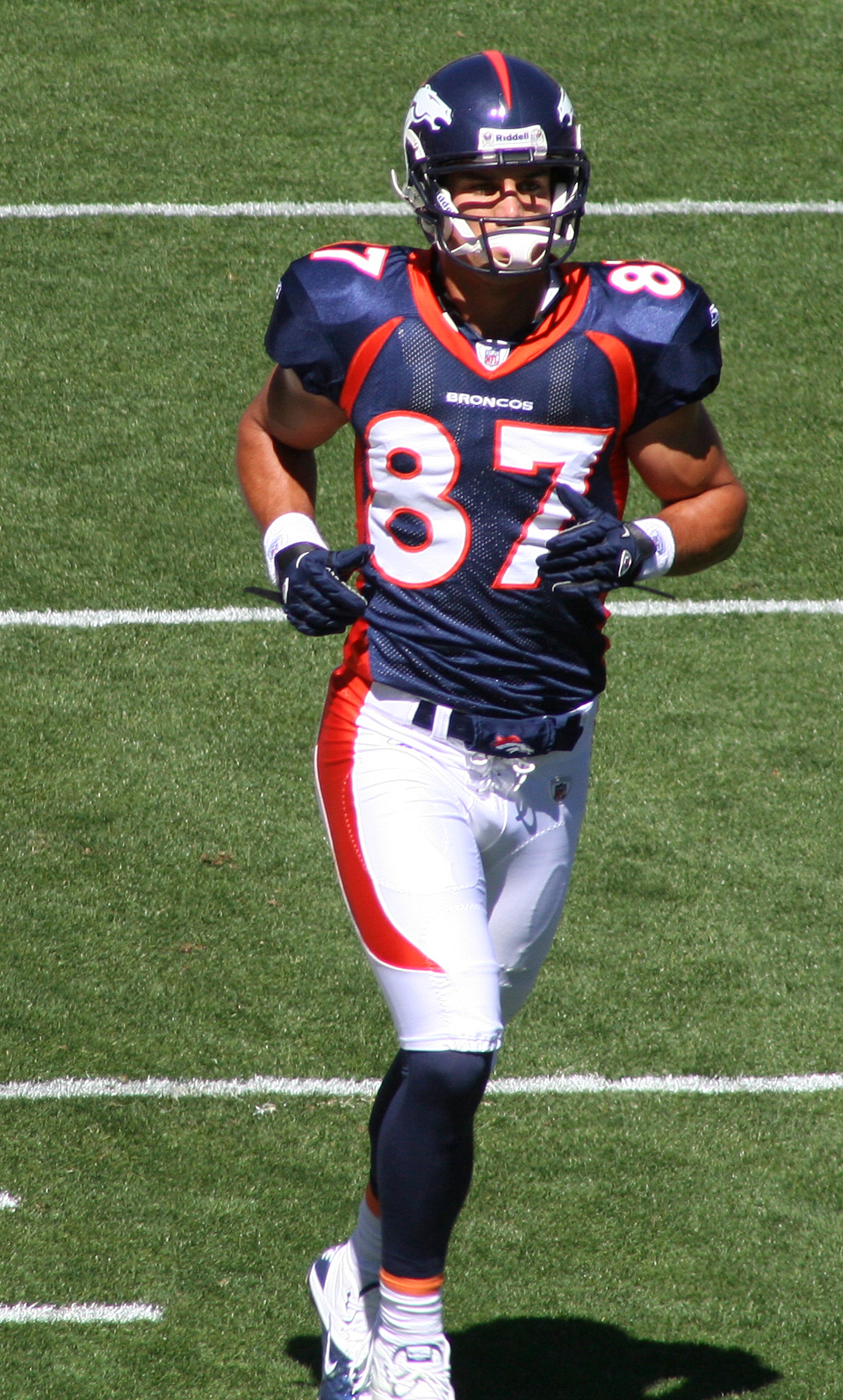
Eric Decker wearing the Denver Broncos' navy blue alternate jersey in 2010

=== National Football League ===
The NFL was the last of the major professional sports leagues to adopt the third jersey rule in 2002, with the only exceptions being the 1994 season, when teams issued a throwback uniform in honour of the league's 75th Anniversary. Initially, the NFL rule stated that a team may wear their third jersey only once a year, however, after one year this restriction was increased to two times a year, and then three soon after. Some teams have exceeded the limit; the 2017 Baltimore Ravens were an example, wearing their all-black uniforms twice that season, and the less-frequent black jerseys on white pants once. There are currently no rules on wearing alternative pants. Teams are only permitted to wear alternative jerseys once in playoff games (except the Super Bowl, where teams must wear their standard uniforms); the only team to do so (other than in 1994) was the 2008 San Diego Chargers. In 2021, the Los Angeles Rams were permitted to wear their white alternate uniforms for Super Bowl. In the past, rules allowed for teams to wear their third jersey two times in the regular season and once in the preseason until 2010. In 2011 teams were no longer allowed to wear their third jersey in the preseason. However, there have been some exceptions since 2011. Beginning in 2018, the NFL began allowing teams to wear their alternates three times, and allowed two different alternates to be worn during the season.

Some teams will generally use one of their third jersey allotments against a particular division opponent each year. For instance, the Los Angeles (formerly San Diego) Chargers would frequently wear their popular alternate powder blue jerseys (that was introduced in 2007) at home against the Oakland Raiders, while the Houston Texans were known to wear their alternate "Battle Red" uniforms at home against the Jacksonville Jaguars, and the Pittsburgh Steelers usually wore their throwbacks from 2007 to 2011 at home against the archrival Baltimore Ravens. The New York Giants were known to wear their alternate red jerseys at home against the Dallas Cowboys until the red jerseys were retired in 2009. The Los Angeles Rams have frequently worn their throwback uniform against the San Francisco 49ers in recent years. The Washington Commanders wear their alternative uniform on home games to commemorate their annual homecoming game once a year since 2012.

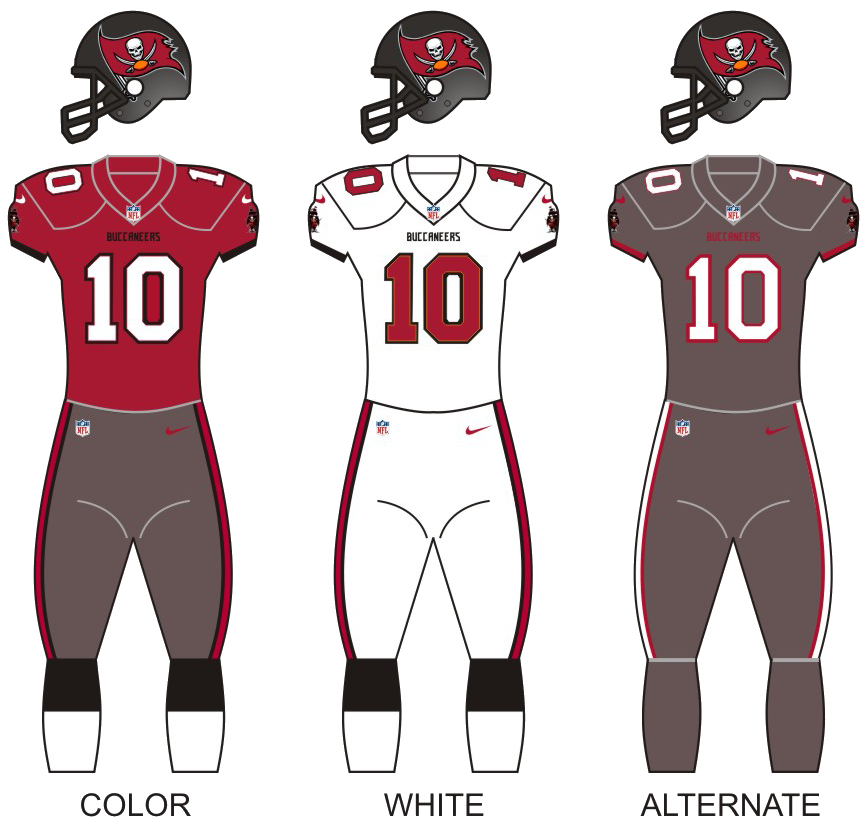
The uniforms of the Tampa Bay Buccaneers since the 2020 season, featuring a third dark grey one

When wearing their third jerseys, especially if the team is wearing a throwback uniform, the team may theme the field around the uniforms. When the New York Jets, for instance, wore their 1960–1962 "Titans of New York" throwbacks at home, they painted the field in the Titans blue-and-gold color scheme (The Jets' current color scheme is green and white). In addition, the Tampa Bay Buccaneers dressed the field up in orange when they wore their "Creamsicle" throwbacks in 2009.

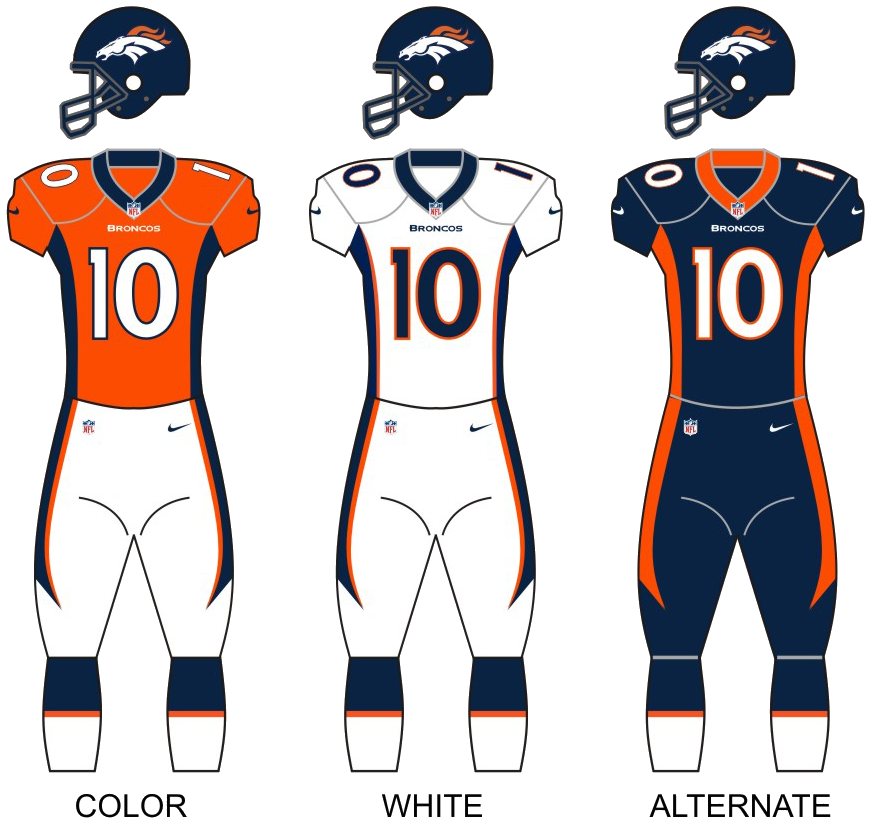
Denver Broncos uniforms featuring a third navy blue and orange jersey, worn since 1997

Teams will generally wear their third jerseys at home, although clubs may wear them as the visiting team as well. The Carolina Panthers are known to wear their electric blue jerseys on the road (most notably in Tampa) if the home team opts to wear their white jerseys against the Panthers and depending on the circumstance (primarily in warmer weather situations, where home teams will wear white to force the visiting team to have their uniforms absorb heat rather than reflect it). Since introducing a wolf grey alternate in 2012, the Seattle Seahawks have worn their alternates only when on the road. The Denver Broncos wore their alternate navy blue jersey with blue pants in a game against the Dallas Cowboys in 2013, and in 2017 the Los Angeles Chargers also wore their alternate powder blue jersey against the Dallas Cowboys for a Thanksgiving Day matchup despite Dallas wearing navy blue. The New York Jets have worn their Titans throwback uniform once in 2007 against the Miami Dolphins at Dolphin Stadium in Miami Gardens, and in 2017 the Buffalo Bills also wore their white throwback uniform against the Miami Dolphins in a week 17 meeting when Miami was also wearing their throwbacks. The Tennessee Titans, who switched back to navy as the primary color in 2015, wore their alternate Columbia blue jersey with white pants on the road in 2016, 2017, and 2018 when their home opponent forced them to wear their dark colors. The Las Vegas Raiders, who previously wore their white jersey with silver numbers for the color rush promotion from 2016 to 2017, wore the alternates for road games at San Francisco in 2018 and at the Los Angeles Chargers in 2020.

Because the football helmet is such a significant and visible part of the football uniform, some teams also wore alternate helmets when wearing their third jersey. This was particularly true for throwback uniforms, such as those worn by the Cowboys (white), Patriots (white), Steelers (yellow), Jets/Titans (blue), and Buccaneers (white). The NFL outlawed the use of alternate helmets beginning in the 2013 season. This has had impact on some teams wanting to wear their throwback jerseys while other teams are not affected by the limitation. Philadelphia Eagles owner Jeffrey Lurie has tried to persuade the league to reverse its one-helmet policy, to allow the Eagles to wear matching kelly green helmets and jerseys. However, beginning in 2022, teams will be allowed to wear an alternate helmet if they so choose.

Outside of league-wide promotions, the only team to not have had an official third uniform as of the 2025 season are the Kansas City Chiefs.

==== Color Rush ====
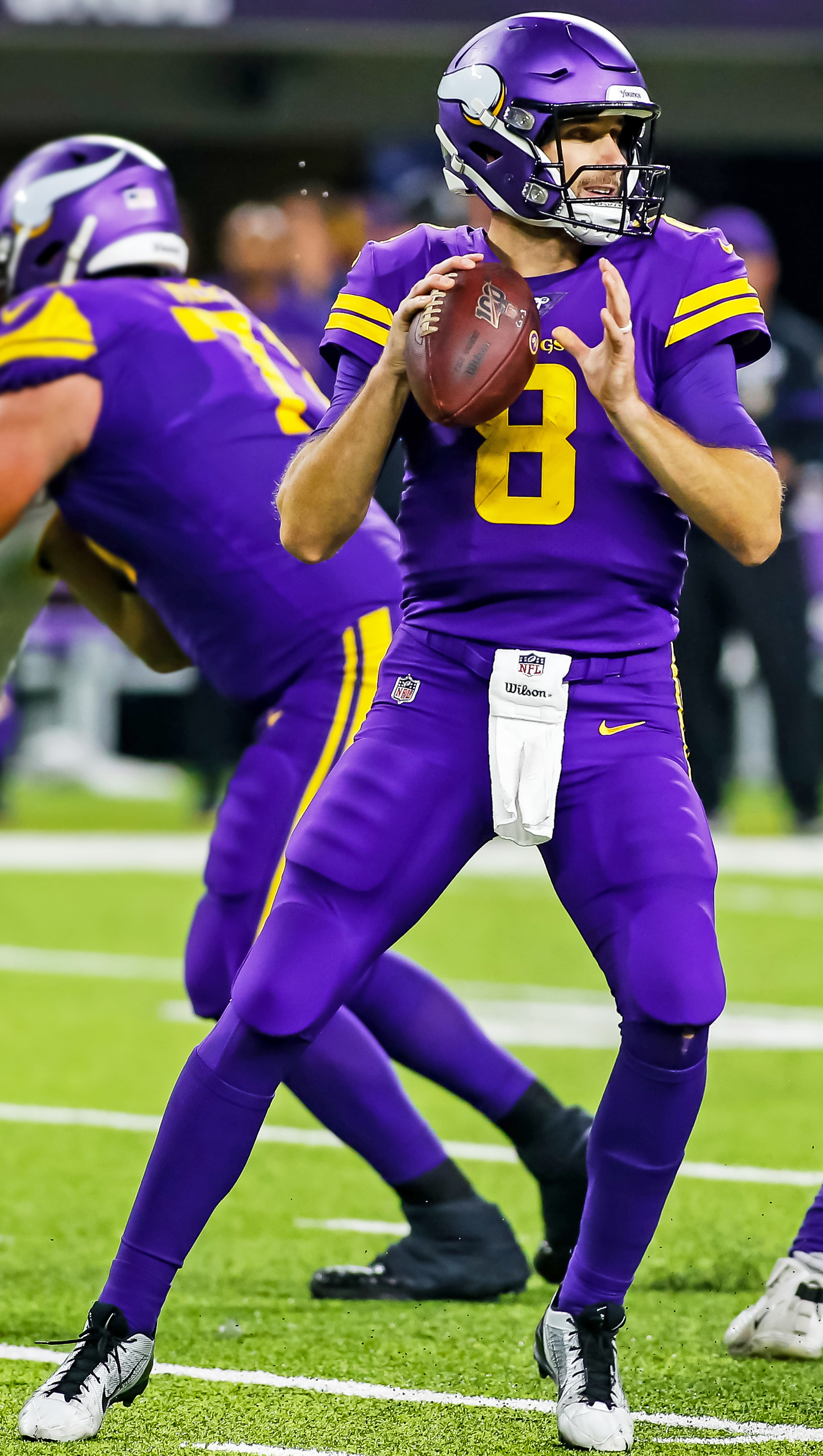
Kirk Cousins wearing the Minnesota Vikings' Color Rush uniform in 2019

For the 2015 season, the NFL debuted a "Color Rush" jersey concept for select Thursday games (Thursday Night Football and one Thanksgiving Day game) in celebration of 50 years of games being broadcast in color. The games featured, mostly, both teams wearing one color matching jerseys, pants, socks and shoes, specially designed to clash with the color of the other team.

The games were as follows:

- November 12: Buffalo Bills (Red) at New York Jets (Kelly Green)
- November 19: Tennessee Titans (Titans Blue) at Jacksonville Jaguars (Bold Gold),
- November 26: Carolina Panthers (Panthers Blue) at Dallas Cowboys (White, due to superstitions about wearing colored jerseys),
- December 17: Tampa Bay Buccaneers (Red) at St. Louis Rams (Yellow Gold).

For 2016, all NFL teams had Color Rush uniforms, although nine teams did not wear them on the field during the 2016 season. The 2017 season also featured Color Rush games, but Washington (who wore all burgundy combo) and Cleveland did not wear their color rush uniforms. The program as a whole is no longer required prior to the 2018 season; teams have the option of whether or not they want to wear their color rush uniforms for the Thursday night games and can wear them beyond that point.

==== Rivalries ====
Starting in 2025, the NFL introduced a "Rivalries" uniform program where special uniforms were worn specifically for games against division opponents. The plan is for teams to wear these uniforms at one home divisional game per season. For the 2025 season, teams in the AFC East and NFC West were the first to wear the new "Rivalries" uniform, followed by the AFC South and NFC North in 2026, the AFC West and NFC East in 2027, and the AFC North and NFC South in 2028.

2026 Rivalries Schedule
Week	Home	Away	Result
2	Arizona Cardinals	Seattle Seahawks	N/A
3	Indianapolis Colts	Houston Texans	N/A
5	Green Bay Packers	Chicago Bears	N/A
8	Detroit Lions	Minnesota Vikings	N/A
8	Jacksonville Jaguars	Indianapolis Colts	N/A
10	Tennessee Titans	Indianapolis Colts	N/A
11	Houston Texans	Indianapolis Colts	N/A
11	Buffalo Bills	Miami Dolphins	N/A
13	New England Patriots	Buffalo Bills	N/A
14	San Francisco 49ers	Los Angeles Rams	N/A
15	Minnesota Vikings	Detroit Lions	N/A
16	Chicago Bears	Green Bay Packers	N/A
16	Seattle Seahawks*	Los Angeles Rams*	N/A
16	New York Jets	New England Patriots	N/A
17	Miami Dolphins	Buffalo Bills	N/A

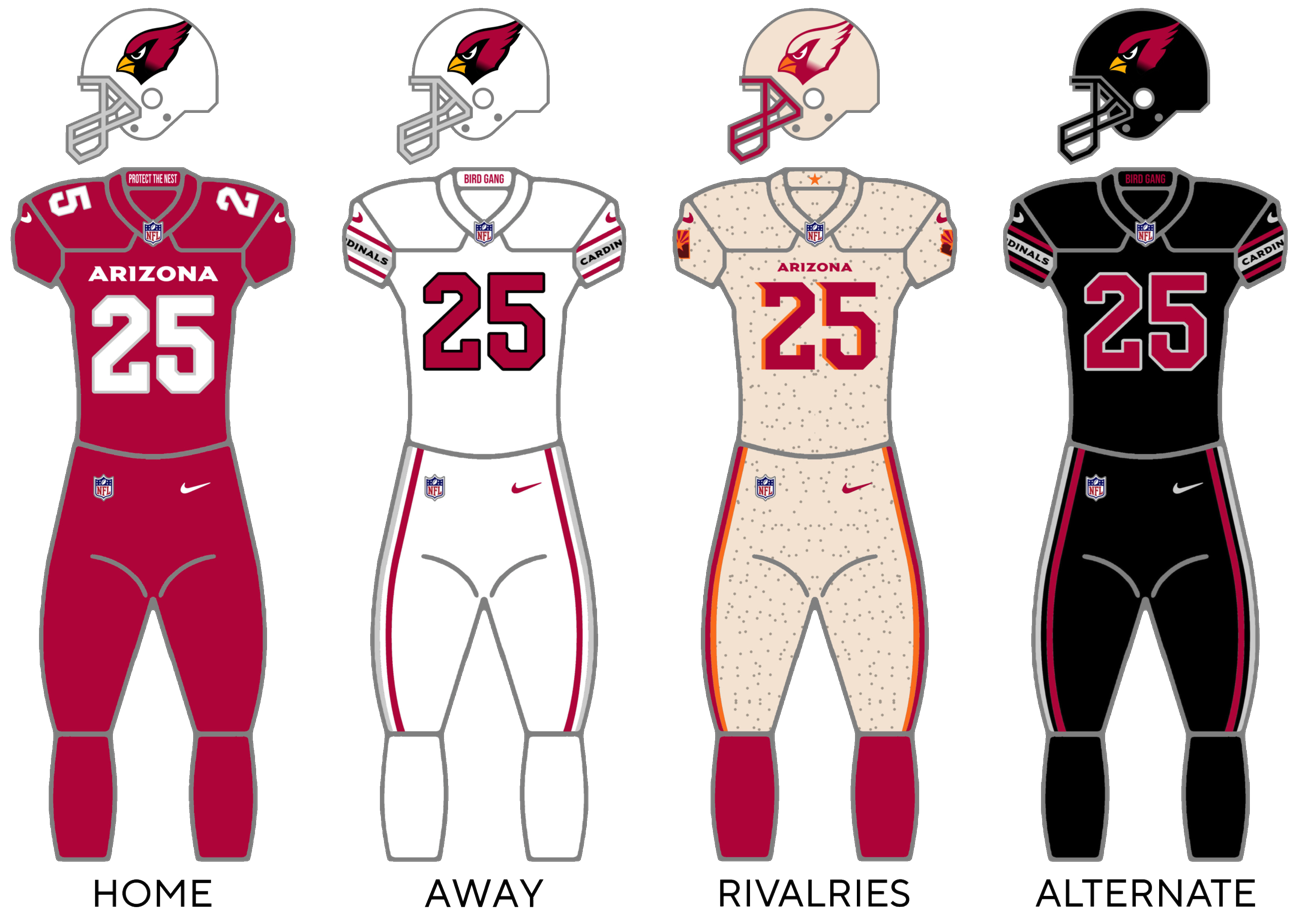
The Arizona Cardinals uniform locker, including their Rivalries set introduced in 2025.

===== Astericks are for teams that will play against each other in their Rivalries set. =====
For the 2026 season, the AFC South and NFC North officially joined the program, meaning half the league has a new set of Rivalries jerseys.

=== College gridiron football ===
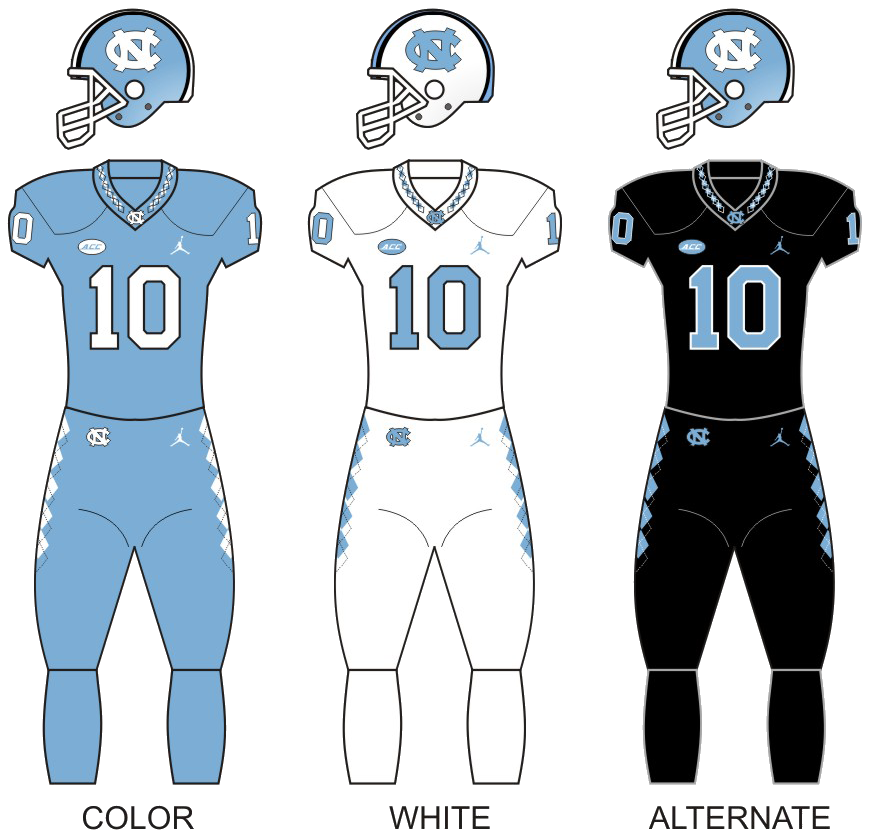
North Carolina uniforms for the 2017 season, with a third jersey in black

Uniforms are much less regulated at the collegiate level compared to the NFL. Tradition continues to guide many teams, especially those with a history of sustained success or championships.

Since the late 2000's, many teams have begun to experiment with alternate uniforms and helmets. Black or dark gray jerseys (with a team color accent), and sometimes all-black uniforms, have been widely used; all-white uniforms are also popular.

Ole Miss was one of the earliest programs to use two different jerseys, wearing either navy blue or red jerseys depending upon the game.

The University of Oregon Ducks have a modular uniform system, consisting of as many as four color choices for jerseys, pants, helmets, socks and other components, allowing the Ducks to select a new combination for nearly every game.

One of the more famous third jerseys is that of the University of Notre Dame. The team wears either white or navy blue for most games, but occasionally special kelly green jerseys with gold numbers, evocative of the "Fighting Irish", are chosen for a major contest.

== Association football ==
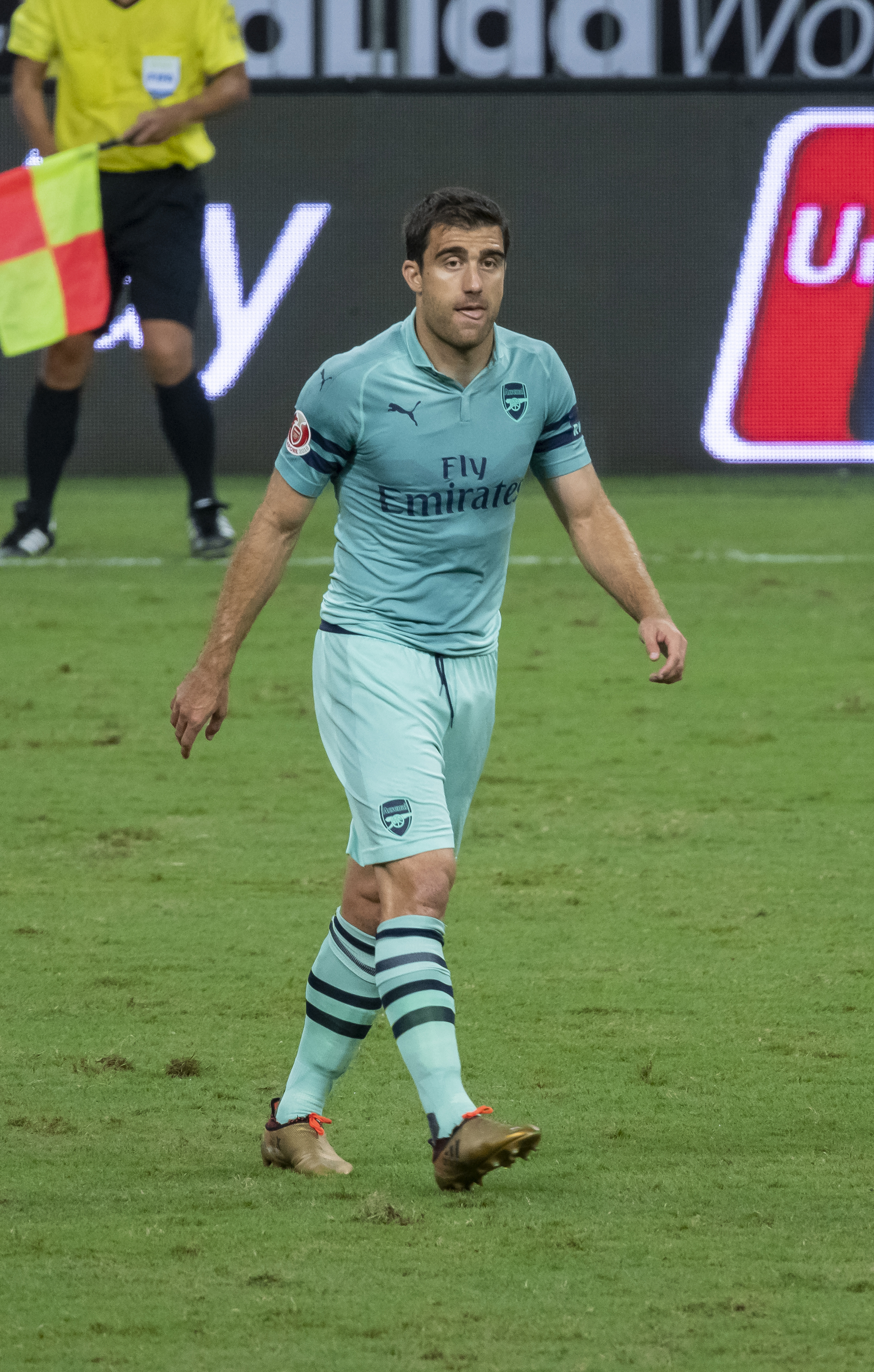
Sokratis Papastathopoulos wears the third kit of Arsenal FC in 2018

Third kits traditionally started in European competition as a way of marking the occasion and existed in association football at least as early as the 1930s. Until 1989–90, the FA Cup competition rules stated: "Where the colours of the two competing clubs are similar, both clubs must change unless alternative arrangements are mutually agreed by the competing clubs". Away kits were often similar as well, therefore third kits were worn in the 1948 FA Cup Final by Manchester United and the 1950 final by Arsenal. Similar rules were employed by European governing body UEFA, with Manchester United winning the 1968 European Cup Final in a blue third kit.

Teams sometimes needed to find makeshift third kits for their players. One notable example being France having to wear the green-and-white stripes of local club C.A. Kimberley for their 1978 World Cup match against Hungary, as both teams were only equipped with their white change shirts for the game.

Third kits in international football are less common; both teams are typically advised to change colours in the event of a home kit clashing. England prepared light blue third kits for the 1970 and 1986 World Cups, which were only worn for the former, and Spain introduced a white third kit for the 2014 World Cup at the insistence of FIFA.

Since the 2000s, most clubs in major European leagues have used a third kit, or had one in reserve. Replicas of the kits are usually sold at club merchandise shops. Sometimes, a previous season's away kit is retained if a clash arises. Clubs sometimes also assign a third kit as their secondary or even primary kit for certain competitions and vice versa.

One notable incident occurred in 1996, when Manchester United changed into their blue and white third kit – mainly used as their cup away kit – at half-time, with manager Alex Ferguson blaming the grey away shirt for several sub-par performances. Ferguson commented, "The players couldn't pick each other out.[...] They said it was difficult to see their team-mates at distance when they lifted their heads". Newcastle United had to wear its sky blue training kit during a 2022 match against Brighton & Hove Albion, because its home kit (black and white), away kit (navy blue) and third kit (white) were all deemed too similar to the blue and white home kit of Brighton & Hove Albion.

== Baseball ==
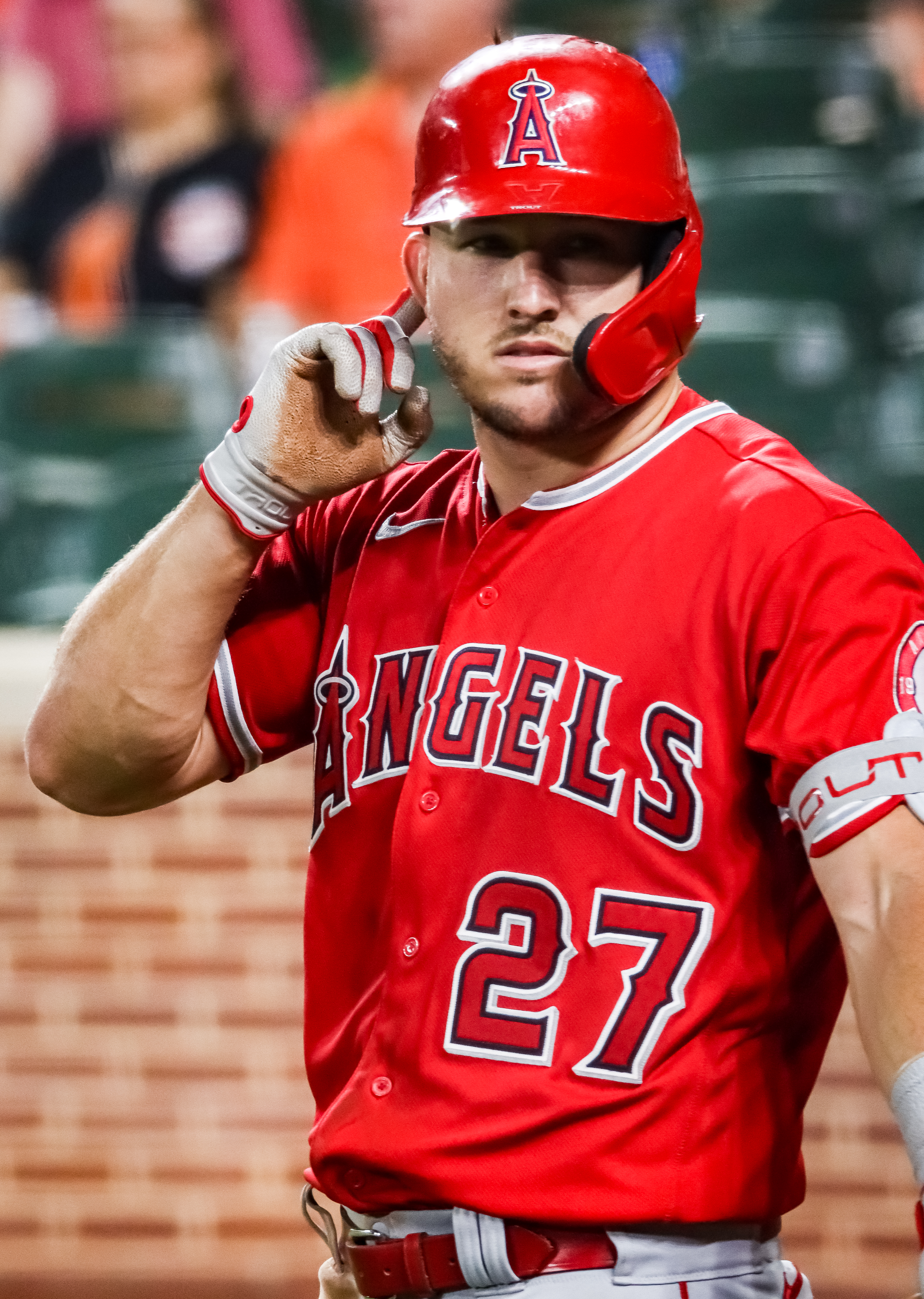
Mike Trout wearing the third jersey of the Los Angeles Angels in 2022

=== Major League Baseball ===
After decades of wearing the same uniforms, Major League Baseball teams began to experiment with numerous designs in the early 1970s, ranging from popular designs (such as the Oakland Athletics' pullover jerseys that most MLB teams later adopted) and not so popular (such as the Chicago White Sox wearing shorts, or the Cleveland Indians wearing all red).

Among such designs that were also tested were third jerseys, to break the traditional mold that baseball teams wear white uniforms at home, and gray on the road. This began in 1972 when the A's flamboyant owner, Charles O. Finley, introduced new uniforms to the team. Taking after the lead of the Pittsburgh Pirates, the jerseys were pullover spandex that would later catch on in MLB (though this would be phased out by the early 1990s in favor of the more traditional button-down jerseys), but by going one step further than the Pirates, the A's introduced alternate gold and green jerseys. The gold jerseys, lighter in color, were considered "home" alternates while the darker green jerseys were considered "away" alternates.

Soon, many teams caught on with different colored jerseys. The Pirates even went as far as to having a rotation of which jerseys to wear, matching white pinstriped, gold, and black pants to wear with jerseys of the same color. The white pinstripes were later phased out in favor of solid white.

The New York Yankees have generally shunned the practice of third jerseys. The Yankees wore three different jerseys in 1911, 1916, and most recently in 1943 according to the Dressed to the Nines database maintained by the National Baseball Hall of Fame. In recent years, the Yankees have worn throwback uniforms for single games in 1996 and 2012.

On May 7, 1995, the Detroit Tigers wore an alternate navy jersey with a tiger stepping through a white old English "D" as their logo. At the time, it was the only game that the Tigers wore a third jersey. However, starting in 2026, the Tigers added an orange home alternate jersey and a navy blue road alternate jersey. This leaves the Yankees as the only team without an official third jersey.

Third jerseys otherwise remain popular in baseball today, either as an alternate design or as a throwback known as "Turn Back the Clock Night." The Milwaukee Brewers, for example, have worn a variation of their 1978–1993 home uniforms for every Friday home game. In 1999, the Seattle Mariners hosted the Kansas City Royals for a game where both teams wore "futuristic" uniforms meant to represent the year 2027 (what will be the Mariners 50th season). The "Turn Ahead The Clock" promotion was so successful that it was copied the next year by 20 MLB teams, this time representing the year 2021 (due to sponsorship by the real estate company Century 21); however, the jerseys were roundly ridiculed and have not been seen since.

Nathan Lukes wearing the Blue Jays' red Canada Day uniforms in 2026

The Toronto Blue Jays change from their traditional blue and grey jersey to a red alternate jersey every Canada Day (July 1) to help celebrate the national holiday (and with it, a cap with a red maple leaf on it, which is Canada's national symbol). In 2007, the Jays announced that as part of the team's popular "Flashback Friday" promotion, the team would use replica uniforms based on the powder-blue road uniforms used in the 1980s at all Friday night home games, starting with the 2008 season. To complete the look, the Jays also wore the original blue and white caps, with their traditional logo on the front of the uniform as well as on the caps. In 2017, to celebrate Canada's 150th anniversary, the Blue Jays wore alternate red jerseys and caps for every Sunday home game. The Tampa Bay Rays wore a black alternate from 1998 to 2000 when they were the Devil Rays, and from 2005 to 2007 they wore green alternate jersey worn both at home and away on selected games. When they changed their name to the Rays, they introduced an alternate navy blue for home and away games to go along with their white and gray uniforms. In 2010 they added light blue jerseys to be worn only on Sunday home games. The Cincinnati Reds wear a red alternate at many afternoon home games, and the Atlanta Braves wear a red jersey for every home game played on Sunday, while the Washington Nationals wear red for all weekend home games, and in 2011 have done so for most weekend road games as well. The Pittsburgh Pirates wore a red alternate for every home game played on Friday during the 2007 season, even though red is not an official team color. Since 2009, the Boston Red Sox wore a red alternate jersey for Friday night home games and a blue alternate jersey for Friday night away games. Also since 2008, for every afternoon home game, the Kansas City Royals wear powder-blue jerseys almost reminiscent of the old jerseys they wore in the 1980s (and in 2010 introduced new powder-blue caps to be worn with these jerseys, though they have since gone back to wearing their normal blue caps). The San Francisco Giants wear orange jerseys during all Friday home games. The Philadelphia Phillies introduced an alternate cream-colored uniform (with a blue cap to complete the look) in 2008 and currently wear it for all afternoon home games. Most recently the Mariners revived their teal jerseys from the mid-1990s, to be used on Friday home games. The Seattle Mariners also have a navy blue alternate away jersey. In 2015 they also introduced an alternate version of their home uniforms, using the team's classic blue-and-yellow scheme on cream uniforms, to be worn on Sunday home games. The Baltimore Orioles wear alternate black jerseys (with a cap showing the "O's" script logo) every Friday, regardless of whether they are home or away (home games against the Red Sox would force the latter to wear their regular grey uniforms rather than their navy Friday uniforms), and in 2012 they introduced an alternate orange jersey to be worn during Saturday games.

In 2013, the New York Mets introduced two different blue alternate jerseys; one has their team name on it (in orange lettering) and is used at home, while the other has their city name on it (in gray lettering) and is used on the road. Prior to that, the Mets wore two black alternate jerseys in a similar fashion as their current blue alternates.

To honor the U.S. military, during Sunday home games, the San Diego Padres originally sported special camouflage-colored jerseys (with green caps to match); in 2011 the camouflage jerseys were changed to a brown/tan "desert camo" with a tan cap. Then in 2016, the Padres replaced them with a new "navy camo" jersey (honoring the U.S. Navy) with a blue cap. Also, they released a modernized version of the franchise's classic brown jerseys with brown-and-yellow caps (which was originally worn from 1969 to 1984) to be worn for Friday home games.

In contrast, the Chicago Cubs frequently wear a blue alternate jersey on the road, and not according to the day of the week. This jersey is worn based on the decision of the starting pitcher (particularly when Carlos Zambrano was scheduled to start), thus explaining why it is worn more often than other third jerseys.

After the death of Harmon Killebrew in 2011, the Minnesota Twins decided to wear their cream-colored "throwback" third jersey – a direct replica of the uniforms used for most of Killebrew's career – for every home game for the rest of the year.

The Milwaukee Brewers have two alternate uniforms with the same color, with one featuring the team nickname and used on home games, the other featuring the city name and used on away games; in addition to their regular alternates, since 2011 the Brewers have, during various "Heritage" games, worn uniforms with "Cerveceros" ("Brewers" in Spanish), "Bierbrauer" (German), "Birrai" (Italian) and "Piwowarzy" (Polish); their opponents during those games would usually also have the foreign translation of their own team name on their road uniforms, such as "Piraten" ("Pirates" in German) or "Cardenales" ("Cardinals" in Spanish).

More recently, there is also a trend towards alternate grey uniforms. The San Francisco Giants wear a different version of their road grey uniforms, featuring the interlocking "SF" instead of the city name in full. This design is similar to the road uniforms the team utilized in the late 80's. The Dodgers and the Cubs have followed suit in wearing alternate grey uniforms, sporting the team name in front (rather than the city name) for their grey alternates.

All 30 MLB teams wore special colored jerseys with contrasting sleeves on the weekend of August 25–27, 2017, for Players Weekend. The Cardinals and Pirates also used these jerseys on August 20, when they met in the MLB Little League Game in Williamsport, Pennsylvania; both this game and Players Weekend coincided with the 2017 Little League World Series in South Williamsport. Notably, the 2017 Players Weekend marked the first time the Yankees ever placed names on the back of their jerseys. Players Weekend has since become an annual affair, with similar jersey changes for each subsequent event.

The trend toward multiple uniforms of the same color can also lead to on-field mix-ups: in 2011, Brewers pitcher Zack Greinke, making a pinch-hitting appearance, accidentally wore the "Bierbrauer" jersey the night before German Heritage Day, while in 2014, just three games into the first season where the alternate was introduced, outfielder Junior Lake played the first inning in a "Chicago" jersey while the rest of the team wore "Cubs".

In 2023, Major League Baseball limited teams to two alternate uniforms in addition to a home and road uniform and a City Connect uniform; this is known as the "4+1 rule". While some teams complied with the rule, including teams such as the Seattle Mariners and Tampa Bay Rays replacing their gray road uniforms with colored tops, MLB allowed the San Diego Padres to keep their two Sunday camouflage home uniforms in order to maintain their tradition of honoring the United States Armed Forces. In addition to the two aforementioned uniforms, the Padres also wear brown tops with sand pants as an alternate road uniform.

==== City Connect ====
In 2021, Nike and Major League Baseball introduced the City Connect series, in which teams unveil alternate uniforms that were a reflection of their community. In a break from recent trends of wearing only colored alternate tops whilst pairing them with either gray or white pants, some designs began incorporating similarly colored pants for the occasion, giving a full-color treatment from shoulders to feet. As of 2024, 28 of 30 MLB teams have City Connect uniform. The New York Yankees and Oakland Athletics are the only two teams without a City Connect uniform.

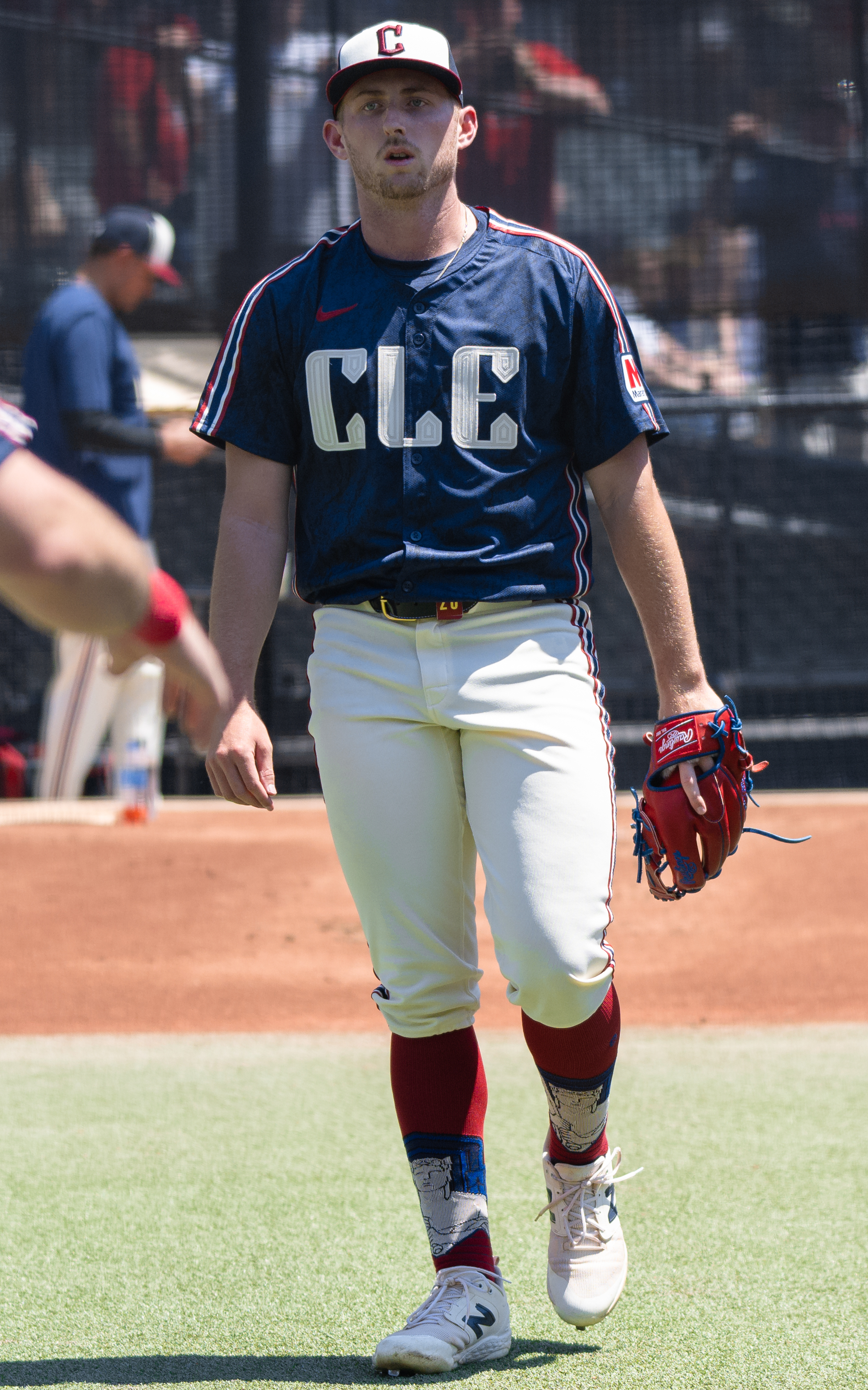
- Tanner Bibee wearing the Cleveland Guardians' City Connect uniform in 2024
  2021
  - Boston Red Sox; debuted April 17
  - Miami Marlins; debuted May 21
  - Chicago White Sox; debuted June 5
  - Chicago Cubs; debuted June 12
  - Arizona Diamondbacks; debuted June 18
  - San Francisco Giants; debuted July 9
  - Los Angeles Dodgers; debuted August 20
- 2022
  - Washington Nationals; debuted April 9
  - Houston Astros; debuted April 20
  - Kansas City Royals; debuted April 30
  - Colorado Rockies; debuted June 4
  - Los Angeles Angels; debuted June 11
  - Milwaukee Brewers; debuted June 24
  - San Diego Padres; debuted July 8
- 2023
  - Atlanta Braves; debuted April 8
  - Texas Rangers; debuted April 21
  - Seattle Mariners; debuted May 5
  - Cincinnati Reds; debuted May 19
  - Baltimore Orioles; debuted May 26
  - Pittsburgh Pirates; debuted June 27
- 2024
  - Philadelphia Phillies; debuted April 12
  - New York Mets; debuted April 27
  - Tampa Bay Rays; debuted May 3
  - Detroit Tigers; debuted May 10
  - Cleveland Guardians; debuted May 17
  - St. Louis Cardinals; debuted May 25
  - Toronto Blue Jays; debuted May 31
  - Minnesota Twins; debuted June 14
  - Los Angeles Dodgers (second design); debuted June 22
- 2025
  - Washington Nationals (second design); debuted March 29
  - Houston Astros (second design); debuted March 31
  - San Francisco Giants (second design); debuted April 8
  - Colorado Rockies (second design); debuted April 20
  - Chicago White Sox (second design); to be debuted May 2
  - Miami Marlins (second design); to be debuted May 3
  - Arizona Diamondbacks (second design); to be debuted May 9
  - Boston Red Sox (second design); to be debuted May 16

== Basketball ==
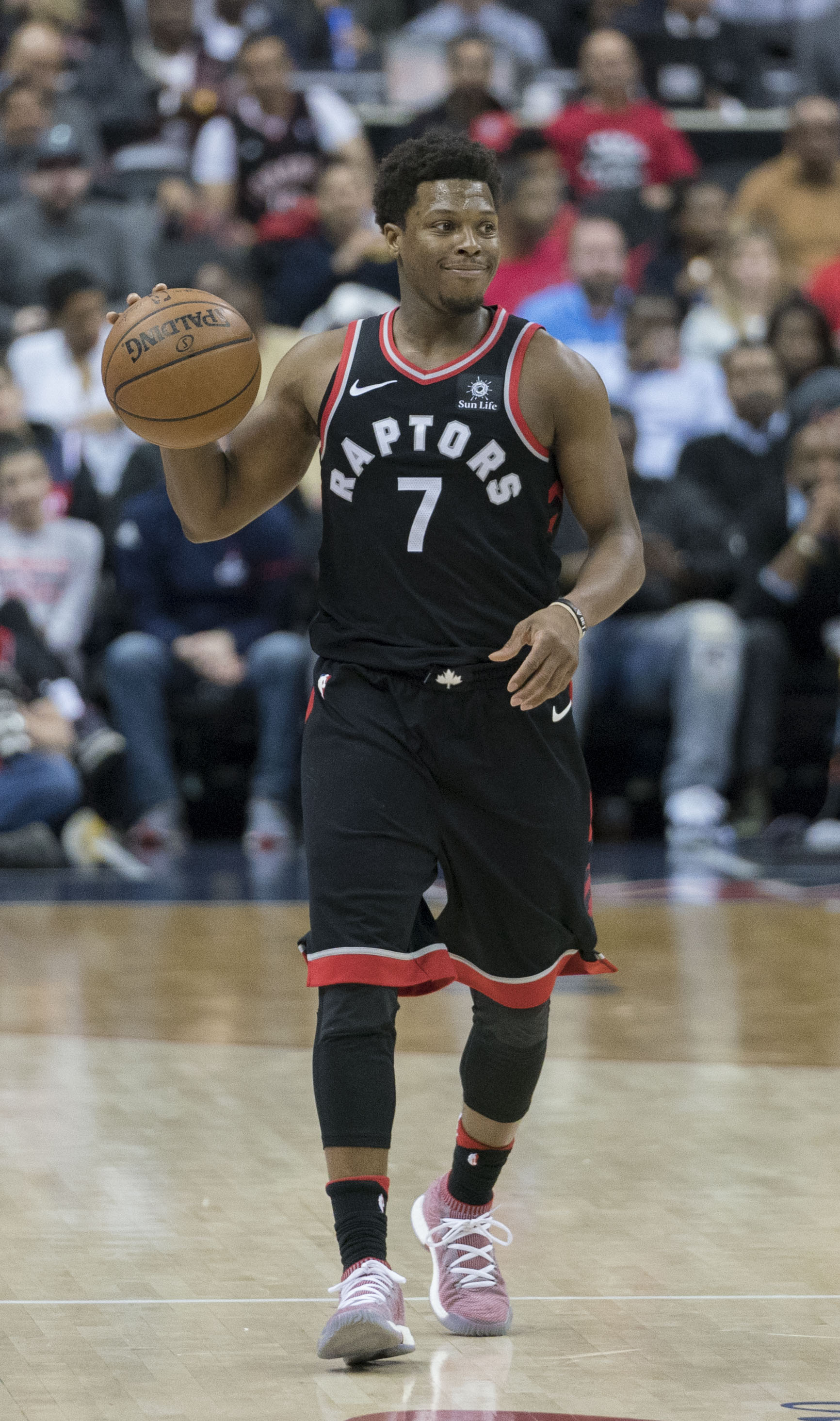
Kyle Lowry wears the third jersey of the Toronto Raptors in 2018

=== National Basketball Association ===
The concept of the third jersey in the NBA was first introduced when the Atlanta Hawks wore neon green alternate jerseys in addition to their standard blue road and white home jerseys during the 1970–71 and 1971–72 seasons. However, it was not until the mid-1990s that third jerseys became a common trend throughout the league.

The 1994–95 season brought the first wave of third jerseys in the NBA, as the Hawks, Charlotte Hornets, Detroit Pistons, Orlando Magic, Phoenix Suns and Sacramento Kings released new alternate uniforms. The trend continued in the 1995–96 season with the Chicago Bulls, Miami Heat, Milwaukee Bucks and New York Knicks introducing their own third jerseys.

Since then, third jerseys became a regular part of every NBA team's uniform rotation, but at first, not all teams were receptive with the concept. For instance, the Boston Celtics and Los Angeles Lakers initially refused to join the trend out of respect to tradition, but they eventually unveiled new alternates in the 2002–03 and 2005–06 seasons respectively.

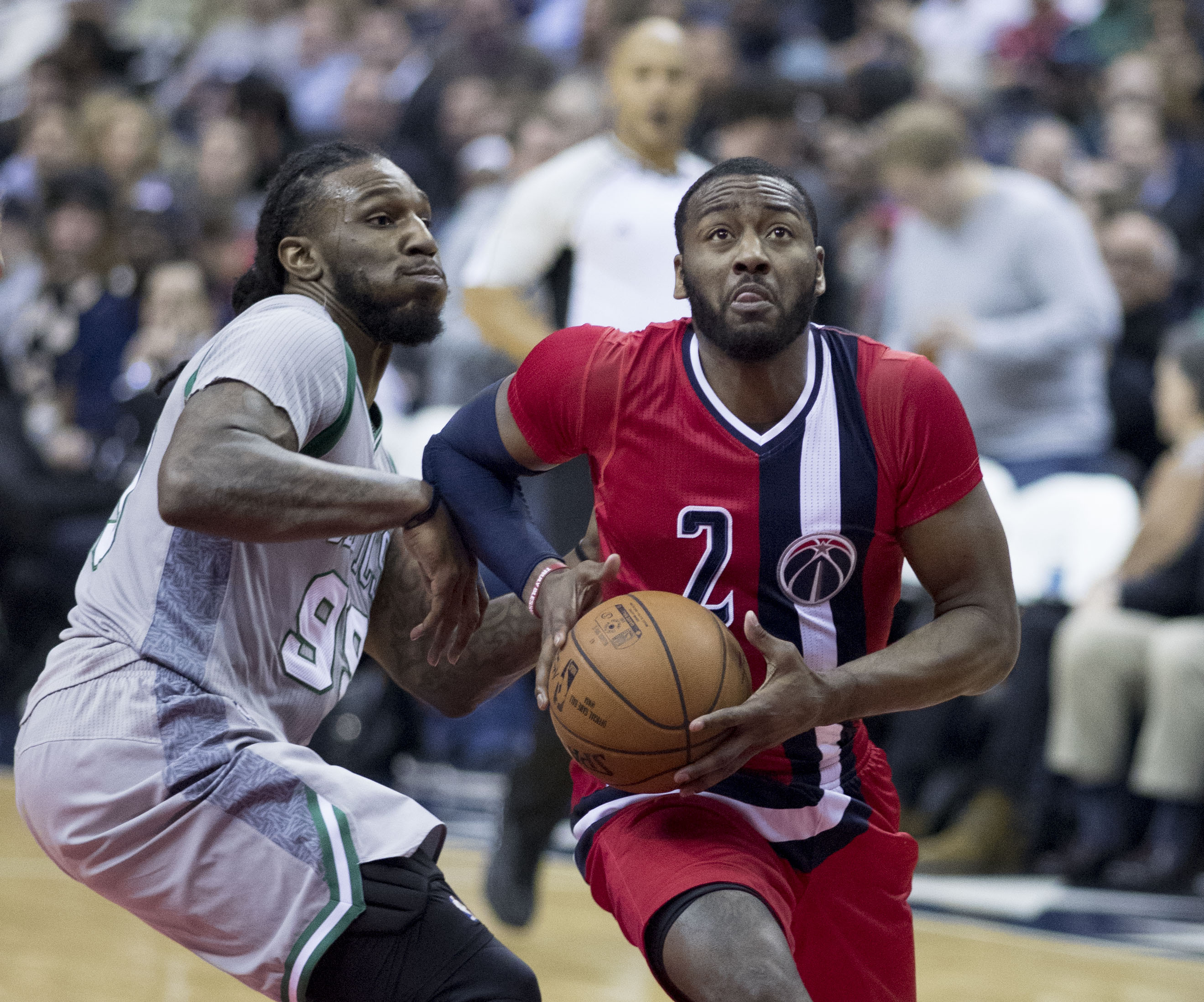
Jae Crowder of the Boston Celtics (left) and John Wall of the Washington Wizards (right) wear sleeved jerseys in 2017

The third jersey trend only got stronger when the NBA signed exclusive uniform contracts with Reebok and later Adidas. The Adidas deal, in particular, saw the introduction of additional alternate uniforms in an effort to boost jersey sales; examples include the Golden State Warriors' sleeved alternates and the Heat's monochrome uniforms.

In addition to third jerseys, there are also holiday-themed jerseys that are worn only on special occasions. These include the jerseys worn on Christmas Day, Chinese New Year, Mardi Gras (for the New Orleans Pelicans), and Saint Patrick's Day.

Other alternate uniforms in the NBA include the "Noche Latina" uniforms, military-inspired uniforms, and "Pride" uniforms, all of which were also concepts introduced by Adidas.

NBA teams were only allowed to introduce a new third jersey at least two years after unveiling a new logo and uniform set. This rule has since been relaxed somewhat, following more recent third jersey releases by the Utah Jazz, the Brooklyn Nets, the New Orleans Pelicans, the New York Knicks, the Philadelphia 76ers, the Phoenix Suns the Charlotte Hornets and the Atlanta Hawks, in which some of the teams release their alternates on the same day as their regular home and away set.

Teams are also allowed to wear their third jerseys as often as desired during the first three rounds of the NBA Playoffs and the NBA Finals. Per the NBA Rule Book, there is no official rule that states that teams are restricted on wearing alternate uniforms or white at home during the NBA Finals. They only requirement stated is from Section VI, c. which states, "The home team shall wear light color jerseys, and the visitors dark jerseys unless otherwise approved. For neutral court games and doubleheaders, the second team named in the official schedule shall be regarded as the home team and shall wear the light colored jerseys." An example of this was when the Cleveland Cavaliers won the 2016 NBA Finals in a black sleeved alternate jersey.

Alex Sarr of the Washington Wizards wearing the Wizards' City uniform in 2024

This rule concerning uniform designations was eliminated once Nike became the uniform provider for the NBA in 2017. In doing so, teams now have the freedom to choose whichever uniform they want to wear, whether it's the "Association" white jersey (formerly the de facto home jersey), the "Icon" dark jersey (formerly the de facto away jersey), the "Statement" alternate color jersey (formerly the de facto third jersey) and the annual "City" and (in 2019 and 2021) "Earned" jerseys. The "Statement" jerseys are usually changed after a three-year cycle, whether through a minor alteration or a major overhaul. Like with Nike's later uniform contract with Major League Baseball, its contract with the NBA only limited teams to three "core" uniforms plus an annual "City" jersey and an occasional "Classic" jersey, leading to the disappearance of limited edition holiday and Pride-themed uniforms from the Adidas era.

== Canadian football ==
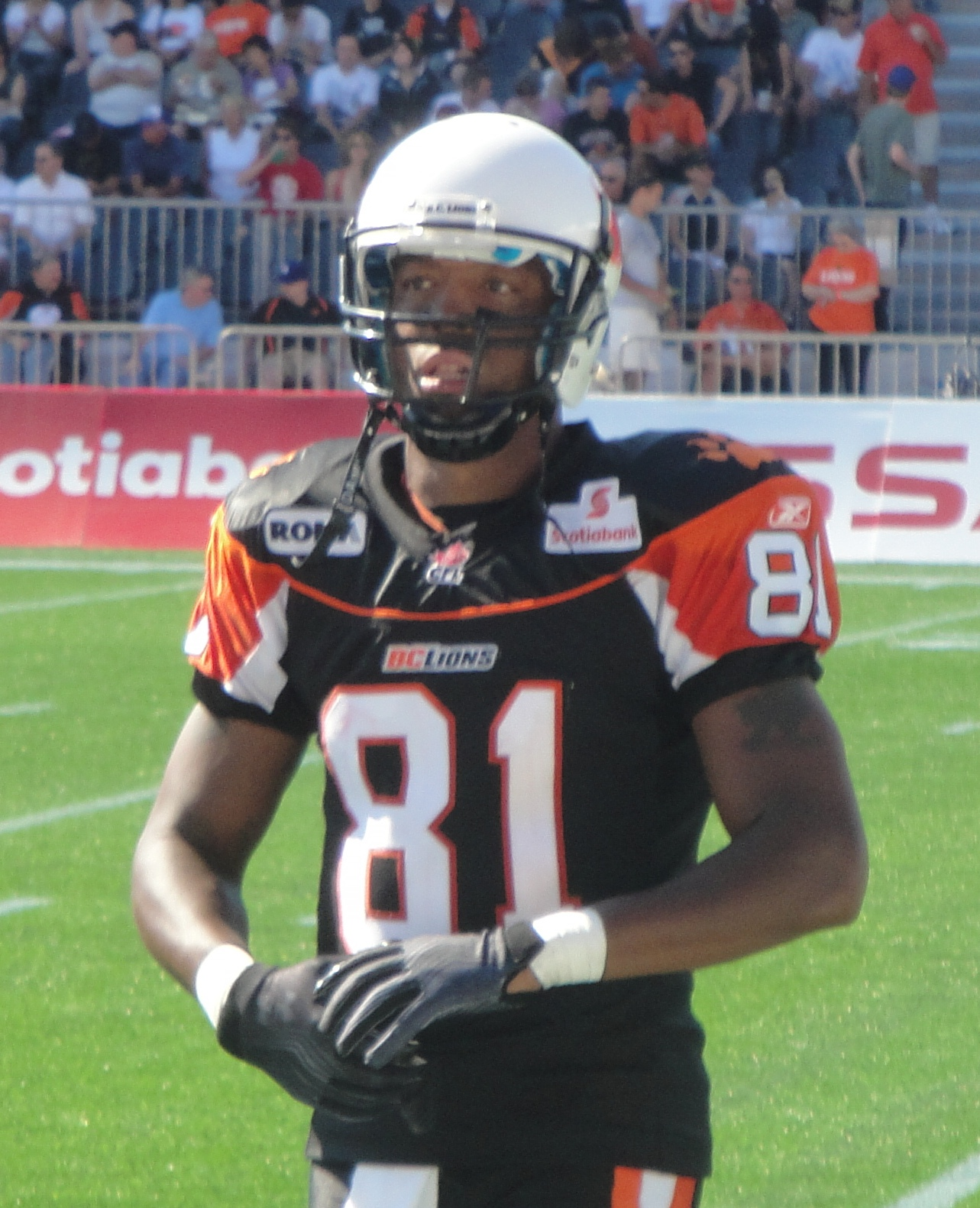
Geroy Simon wearing the BC Lions' black third jersey in 2011.

The Canadian Football League first introduced the use of a permanent third jersey on September 6, 1994, when the Calgary Stampeders wore black uniforms for the Labour Day Classic against the Edmonton Eskimos. The CFL did not have a rule for use of alternate uniforms and teams were able to wear them as often or as little as they liked, a rule that is still in effect. Teams are also able to wear multiple alternate jerseys within the same season, as seen with the Montreal Alouettes during their 2009 campaign when they wore alternate black, blue, and throwback jerseys, in addition to their regular home and away uniforms. Teams are also permitted to wear their third jerseys as the away team, provided that they do not clash with the home team's uniforms. Despite teams having no restrictions with third jerseys, only the Stampeders chose to wear them during the 1990s, presumably due to the league's financial struggles during this decade. As such, no CFL USA team ever wore an alternate uniform. The Alouettes were the next team to introduce third uniforms in 2001 when they also wore black uniforms; a colour that was not part of the team's colour scheme. The Saskatchewan Roughriders first wore their black alternates in 2002 as it became more normal for teams to wear these jerseys. The BC Lions wore orange retro uniforms twice during the 2003 season as part of the celebrations for their 50th season, but those were only worn for that season.

In the 2005 CFL season, Reebok redesigned the primary home and away uniforms for all nine teams and also introduced new alternate uniforms for six teams, with the Hamilton Tiger-Cats and Toronto Argonauts abstaining and the Saskatchewan Roughriders keeping their alternates that they had been using since 2002. Calgary introduced the third iteration of their black uniforms while the Alouettes wore a blue jersey with red numerals. The BC Lions, having now converted to orange as the primary jersey colour, wore black alternates, the Edmonton Eskimos and Winnipeg Blue Bombers wore their own versions of gold alternates, and the Ottawa Renegades wore red alternate jerseys.

For 2006, the Tiger-Cats introduced gold alternate jerseys on August 12, 2006, in a game against the Argonauts. This season also saw the first case of both teams wearing alternate uniforms as the Alouettes brought back their black uniforms in a home game against the Eskimos who wore their gold jerseys. The Winnipeg Blue Bombers also wore their alternate gold jerseys as the away team for their playoff game against the host Toronto Argonauts. The Toronto Argonauts were the last CFL team to wear a third jersey as they wore alternate Cambridge blue uniforms on July 26, 2007.

The league recognized the history of its teams by having member clubs wear throwback uniforms beginning with the 2008 CFL season with the Toronto Argonauts and Winnipeg Blue Bombers wearing 1950s-style uniforms for two games featuring both teams. The CFL then had all eight current teams wear 1960s-based uniforms for the 2009 CFL season and 1970s-based uniforms for the 2010 CFL season. These differed from the designated third jerseys in that most were for one season only, except for the Saskatchewan Roughriders white retro jersey and the Winnipeg Blue Bombers royal blue retro jersey that were worn in subsequent seasons. These throwback uniforms were worn to lead up to the 100th Grey Cup celebration.

Following the league-based retro initiative, the league then turned its attention to a modernized take on all nine teams (including the expansion Ottawa Redblacks) by introducing Signature uniforms mostly in the 2014 season. The Lions first wore their Signature uniforms in 2013 as part of their 60th season celebrations with the other eight teams following suit the following season. The uniforms were worn twice by each team except for Ottawa who wore theirs three times and Winnipeg who wore theirs once. In 2015, Winnipeg abandoned the uniforms altogether, as did the BC Lions, despite their popularity in BC. Every other team wore theirs twice during 2015 except for Hamilton, who wore theirs once on Labour Day.

With the league-wide redesign of uniforms by Adidas in 2016, Calgary, Edmonton, and Montreal each retained their signature series uniforms and each wore them twice during the regular season (Calgary also wore theirs in the West Final game). Saskatchewan also wore a modified version of their retro-themed uniforms in two games that year. When New Era became the league outfitter in 2019, only Calgary, Edmonton, and Saskatchewan wore third jerseys and all three were holdovers from the previous three seasons. Ottawa introduced new alternates in 2021 and four teams wore new alternates in 2022.

As of 2018, teams are permitted to wear third jerseys during the playoffs, but not for the Grey Cup game. The 2010 Saskatchewan Roughriders were the last team to wear alternate uniforms for the championship game.

The following list is a recount of all known alternate uniforms worn by member clubs as of the 2024 CFL season and does not include one-time throwback uniforms:

- BC Lions – Introduced a black alternate uniform in 2005 loosely based on the 1960s jersey, initially worn with white helmets. Switched to orange helmets with black uniform from 2006 to 2008, including the 2006 West final and 94th Grey Cup win. Worn with black retro helmets in 2009 and 2010 seasons. Retired the jerseys in 2011 wearing white helmets, in the final game at Empire Field. Introduced gunmetal uniforms, first worn on August 17, 2013, and worn twice during the 2013 and 2014 seasons, including an away game in Toronto on August 17, 2014. The Lions did not wear a third jersey again until October 15, 2022, when the team wore a modified version of the gunmetal uniforms. The team also wore these uniforms for their playoff game in 2022. The Lions wore a new uniform set in 2023, but did not wear a third jersey that year. In 2024, the Lions introduced a third iteration of the gunmetal uniforms with new logos which were worn twice in the regular season and twice more in 2025.

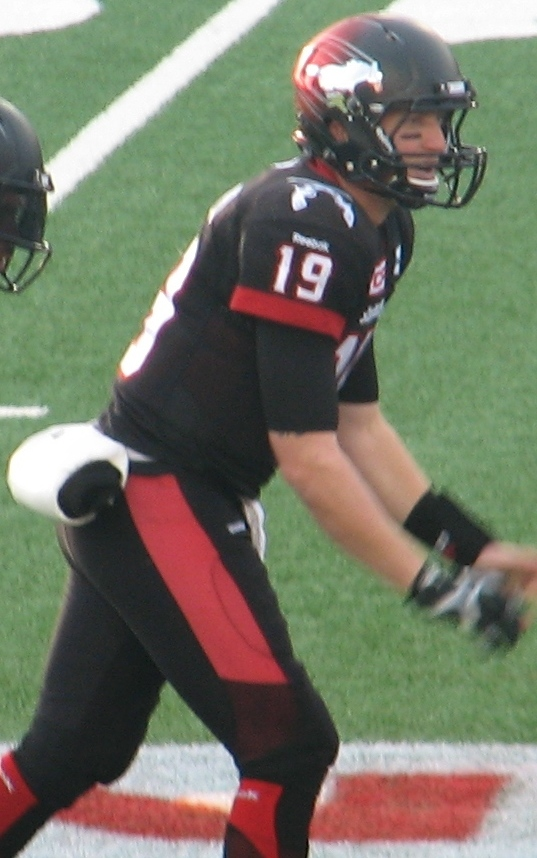
Bo Levi Mitchell wearing the Calgary Stampeders' black jersey in 2014.

- Calgary Stampeders – First to wear third uniforms when they introduced black alternates with red numerals in 1994 on September 6 against Edmonton. They were the first team to wear alternates during a playoff game and the first to wear alternates during a Grey Cup game, which they did in the 86th Grey Cup in 1998. Those black jerseys were retired following the Grey Cup win and new black alternates with white numerals were unveiled in 1999 that were worn until 2004. They first wore black pants with the black jerseys on October 18, 2002 at home vs. the Winnipeg Blue Bombers. The third version of black uniforms were worn on Labour Day in 2005 and were last worn on September 2, 2013. 2011 was the first time the Stampeders wore black helmets with the black uniforms. The Signature series uniforms were first worn, also on Labour Day, for the 2014 season and again from 2015 to 2021. They were also worn for home playoff games from 2015 to 2018. The team introduced new black uniforms in 2022 which were first worn for the Labour Day game that year and once more in the final home game in 2022, which was repeated in 2023. These same black uniforms were worn twice in 2024 and once in 2025. Since 1994, the Stampeders have worn black on Labour Day 21 times.
- Edmonton Elks – First wore their gold alternate jersey on September 9, 2005, against the Calgary Stampeders. Wore the gold alternates against the Alouettes in 2006 as the away team as the Alouettes also wore their alternate uniforms. The club last wore these jerseys on September 7, 2007, again against the Stampeders. The club had no third jersey after the retirement of the gold jersey until the 2014 season when they wore their Signature series green uniforms with the gold "EE" logo. This uniform had been worn at least once each season until the uniforms were rebranded in 2022 where no alternate uniforms were worn that year. In 2024, the Elks introduced green alternate uniforms with green numerals that were worn with gold helmets and green pants, which were worn three times that year and another three times in 2025.
- Hamilton Tiger-Cats – Introduced a gold alternate jersey on August 12, 2006 against the Toronto Argonauts. The jerseys were always paired with black helmets and black pants. They were worn three times during the 2007 and 2008 seasons and worn for the last time on October 31, 2009 and just once for the 2009 season as the team wore retro jerseys that same year. The team had no alternate jersey until the Signature series grey uniform was unveiled in 2014. The grey uniform was worn three times between 2014 and 2015 and no alternate uniform was worn from 2016 to 2021. The team introduced new steel grey uniforms in 2022 which were worn twice that year and twice again in 2023, 2024, and 2025, including once on the road in each season.

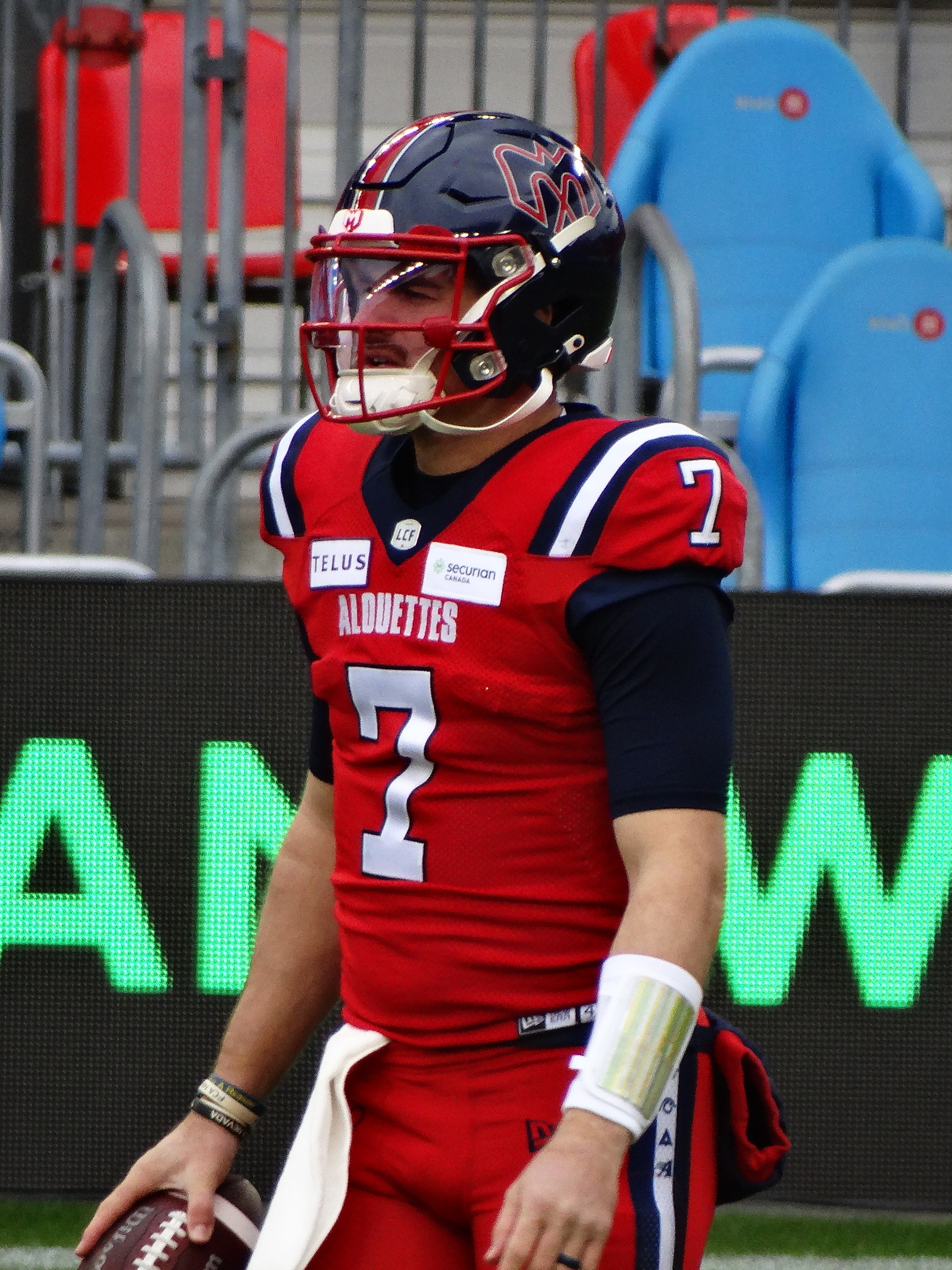
Cody Fajardo wearing the Montreal Alouettes' red third jersey in 2023.

- Montreal Alouettes – Began wearing an all-black uniform in 2001 and continued wearing them until 2004 and two more times in 2006. Introduced a blue alternate with red numerals in 2005 and wore these jerseys in the 93rd Grey Cup. The blue alternates were worn again in 2006, 2009 and 2010. The team introduced a new black jersey, this time with grey numerals as opposed to blue, for the 2007 and wore this jersey five times during the regular season while wearing the primary home jersey four times. This jersey was worn until the 2010 season and was brought back one more time for the 2013 season. The team wore dark grey and blue Signature series uniforms for the 2014 season and wore them two times in each subsequent season until 2016. The uniforms were worn just once in 2017 and 2018 and when the Alouettes re-branded in 2019, the team did not wear a third jersey. The Alouettes had planned to introduce a fan-designed third jersey for the 2021 season as part of their 75th anniversary celebrations, but this did not occur following a cancelled 2020 CFL season. Instead, this uniform was revealed in 2023 and was worn three times during the regular season and once in the post-season, including twice for away games, but just once in 2024. The team did not wear a third jersey in their 2025 season.
- Ottawa Rough Riders – Never wore a third jersey.
- Ottawa Renegades – Introduced a red alternate jersey worn with white pants on July 1, 2005 against the Montreal Alouettes. Worn four times for the 2005 season including a game where they wore the jerseys with black pants on September 16, 2005 against the Winnipeg Blue Bombers.
- Ottawa Redblacks – As part of the Signature series, the Redblacks wore red and plaid uniforms three times during the 2014 season, including an away game on November 7 against the Toronto Argonauts. They wore them twice again in 2015. The team did not wear alternate uniforms again until 2021 when they introduced new red alternate uniforms which were worn three times during the season. The red uniforms were worn twice during the 2022 season and three times in 2023, 2024, and 2025.
- Saskatchewan Roughriders – First wore a black uniform with green numerals during the 2002 season. The jersey was always worn with black pants and was last worn in 2006. The team introduced retro-themed green alternate jerseys worn with silver pants in 2007, based on the uniforms first worn in 1967. From 2010 to 2012, these jerseys were worn with white pants. Also in 2010, white retro versions of these jerseys were introduced, but contrary to most CFL teams, the Roughriders continued to wear these until the 2012 season for select away games. In 2013, the green retro jersey was worn with green pants. In 2014, the team remodeled the retro green jersey, this time more resembling the uniforms from the early 1980s. Also in 2014, the team wore their Signature series uniforms twice, while also wearing "blitz green" for the first time. Both the retro uniform and the Signature series uniforms were worn twice during 2015. The team introduced a modified version of their retro uniform in 2016 that did not have shoulder numbers and it has been worn at least twice each season since then, except for 2021 and 2022 when it was only worn for the Labour Day Classic. In addition to the retro uniforms, the Roughriders introduced obsidian alternate uniforms in 2024 which featured a dark shade of green from helmets to socks and were worn three times, including for their home playoff game. In 2025, the Roughriders wore their retro uniforms for the Labour Day Classic and the West Final and they wore their obsidian uniforms for two more regular season games.
- Toronto Argonauts – Were the last franchise to introduce a recurring alternate jersey, which they did in 2007 on July 26 against the Montreal Alouettes. The jersey was Cambridge blue and partnered with their Oxford blue pants and was worn once in 2007, 2008 and 2009. With the retro uniforms that were introduced in 2009, the team also paired the retro Cambridge blue pants with the alternate jerseys for a monochrome Cambridge blue look that the team wore twice that year. The team wore an Oxford blue retro jersey in 2010 that made a return appearance in 2011. The team became the first in the CFL to wear a white alternate uniform that wasn't based on a retro uniform when they wore their Signature series jerseys in 2014. This uniform was worn once at home and once away in both 2014 and 2015. No alternate jersey has been worn since 2016.
- Winnipeg Blue Bombers – Wore gold alternate jerseys as part of their 75th anniversary season in 2005. The jerseys were worn with either white pants or blue pants and were worn every season through to 2010. Additionally, for the three seasons that the Blue Bombers qualified for the playoffs, the gold jerseys were worn for each game, both home and away, and in the 95th Grey Cup. Also in 2010, the club wore retro 1970s era royal blue jerseys, which were then adopted as the alternates for 2011 and 2012. A modified 1980s era royal blue jersey was introduced in 2013 and was also worn in 2014. The Blue Bombers only wore their 2014 Signature series uniforms once, whereas all other teams wore theirs at least twice, possibly due to negative fan reception. The team did not wear an alternate uniform until 2022 when they introduced all-blue uniforms with a white "W" on the front. These uniforms were worn twice in 2022 and 2023, including in the Banjo Bowl both years, but just once in 2024 and 2025.

== Ice hockey ==
=== National Hockey League ===
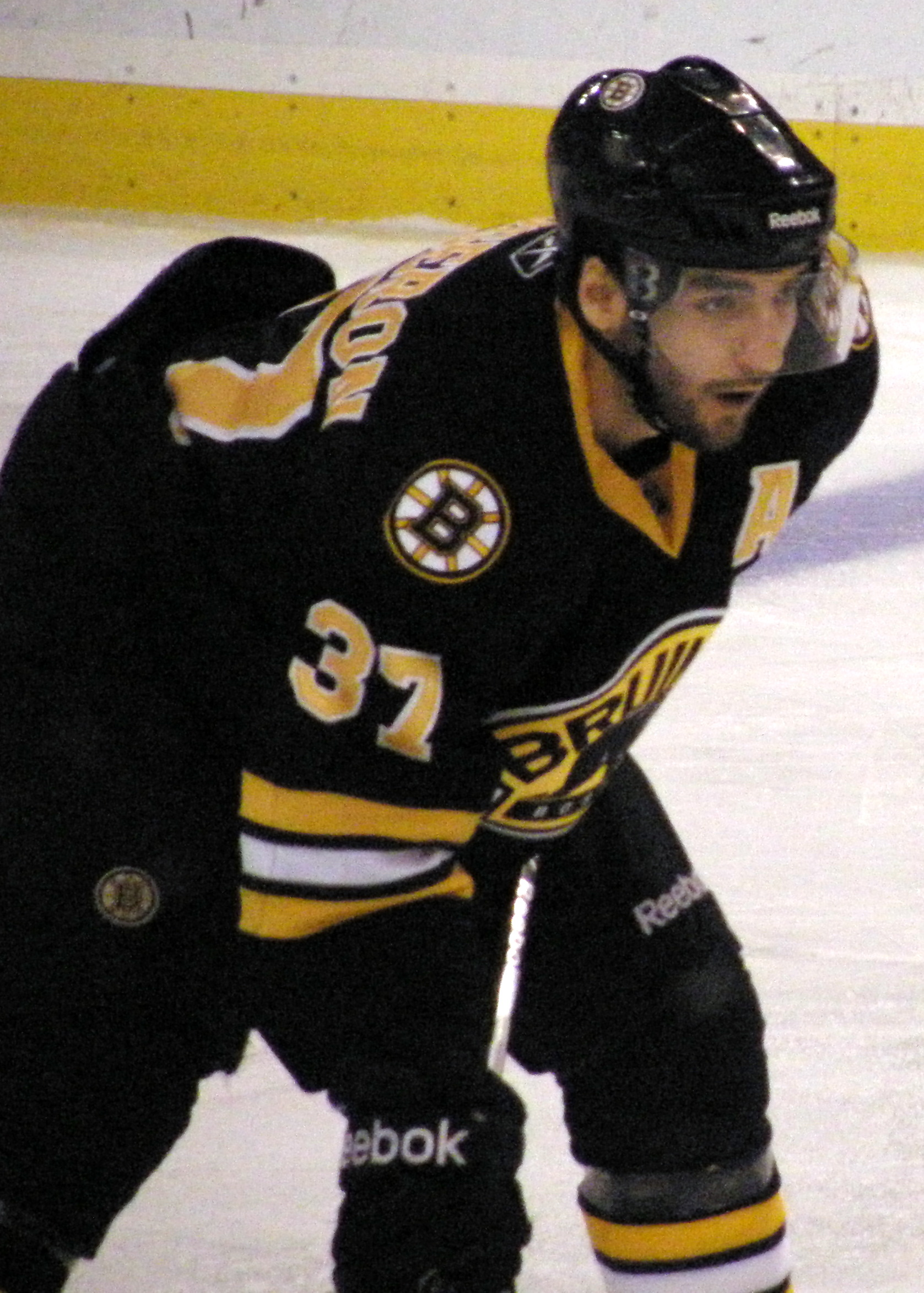
Patrice Bergeron in all black Bruins third jersey in 2011, with exchanged "spoked-B" and shield logo locations

In the National Hockey League, each team has its own distinctive sweater design (ice hockey tradition usually refers to jerseys as "sweaters," because ice hockey players actually wore sweaters on the ice until the 1960s). Prior to 1995 (save a few isolated instances), each team only had two sweaters – one for home use, and one for the road. One sweater was dominantly white (or in a few instances, a light colour), and the other dominantly a dark colour. The home team has first choice of uniforms from the 1917–18 to the 1969–70 seasons (the white or yellow sweater was predominantly the road sweater with the dark sweater predominantly being the home sweater). In the 1970–1971 season, the NHL required teams to wear white (or yellow) sweaters at home and dark sweaters on the road; this rule remained in place until the end of the 2002–03 season. When the Third Sweater Program was introduced in the 1995–96 season, some teams wore the third sweater at home, which would have required an opponent to carry two sets of equipment and uniforms with them while on the road under most circumstances. This was alleviated starting in the 2003–04 season, when new rules mandated dark sweaters at home and white sweaters on the road, with yellow now being treated as a dark colour.

Tom Wilson of the Washington Capitals wearing the Capitals' third jersey in 2022

The first NHL team to feature a three-sweater rotation was the Boston Bruins. From 1955 through 1967, the Bruins had a gold home sweater and a white road sweater, and for several of those seasons featured a black third sweater. The Pittsburgh Penguins would later introduce a gold third sweater in 1981, worn occasionally at home for two seasons for Sunday games and exclusively at home only in the 1983–84 season before retiring it. As part of the NHL's 75th anniversary in the 1991–92 season, for select games the Original Six teams wore throwback sweaters based on designs the teams wore at some point during the first 50 years of the league. The Chicago Blackhawks and Detroit Red Wings wore their throwbacks again for a game at Chicago Stadium in the 1993–94 season.

The 1995-96 third sweater program provided an opportunity for CCM to further experiment with dye-sublimation printing on their sweaters. CCM had introduced the process to the NHL with the 1994 All-Star Game sweaters and the Calgary Flames' new uniforms introduced in the 1994–95 season. The sublimated dye process allows for more complex stripe and graphic designs than were possible or practical with traditional manufacturing methods. The initial participating teams in the 1995–96 season embraced the concept, although the results were mixed. The Bruins' gold jersey, featuring a brown bear's head on the front and jagged striping, lasted through the 2005–06 season, while the Penguins' third jersey, featuring gradient striping that complemented their logo at the time, replaced their road jerseys in 1997. The Vancouver Canucks' red and black jersey with gradient striping, a subtle nod to their garish "Flying V" jerseys from 1978 to 1985, were retired in 1997 when the team changed colours and logos altogether. The jerseys worn by the Mighty Ducks of Anaheim and Los Angeles Kings only lasted one season. Due to the backlash against the less popular designs, the sublimation process was used by fewer teams in subsequent seasons, as newer thirds either rearranged the colours of an existing jersey, or experimented with different construction methods to create new designs.

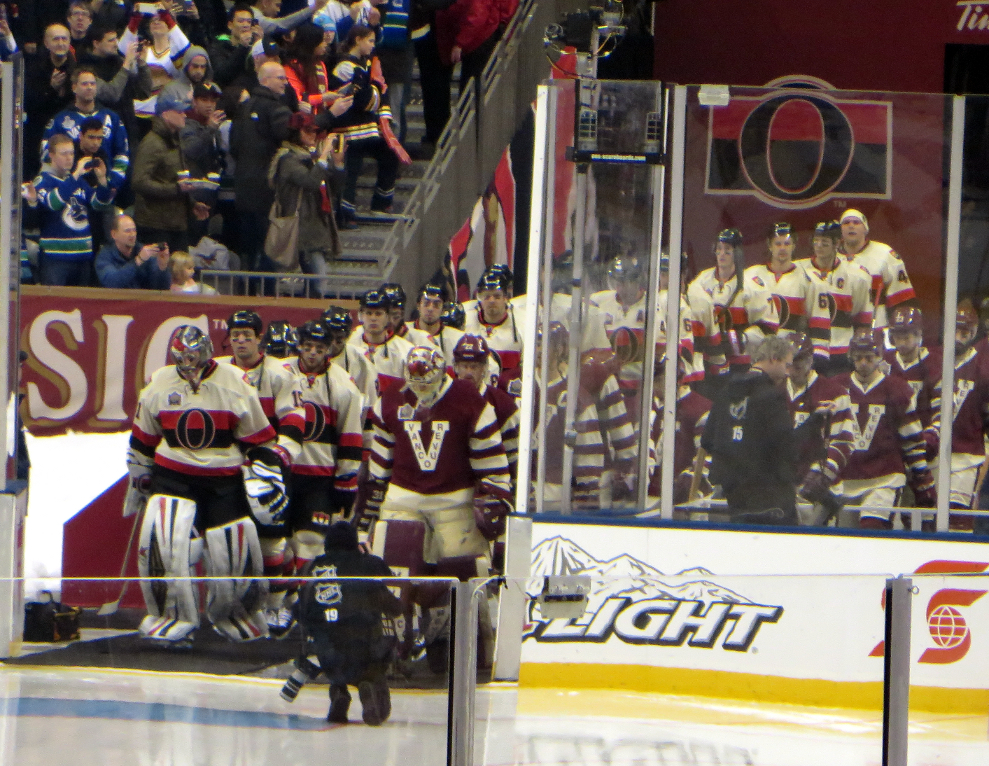
The Vancouver Canucks and Ottawa Senators wearing throwback jerseys for the 2014 NHL Heritage Classic in Vancouver

With the advent of the 2003 Heritage Classic outdoor game, the NHL introduced the Vintage jersey program, allowing a select number of teams to wear throwback designs for a limited number of games, in addition to their existing uniforms. These uniforms were designated with a special V-logo patch. Seven teams participated in the program, and included both home and road versions of throwback designs. As a result, the Bruins, Kings, Canucks, and New York Rangers each had an unprecedented five jerseys in their rotation for that season. The program was suspended due to the 2004–05 NHL lockout, although the Vancouver Canucks and Montreal Canadiens would wear their vintage jerseys for a few games each in the 2005–06 season, and the Canucks and Bruins would wear their dark throwbacks as third jerseys (replacing sublimated-print third jerseys) in the 2006–07 season. The Canucks' and Bruins' throwbacks would later serve as the inspiration for their RBK Edge uniform redesigns in 2007.

Following a one-year hiatus on all third jerseys (save for the 2008 NHL Winter Classic, where the Pittsburgh Penguins and Buffalo Sabres wore throwbacks for that game) as part of the NHL's transition to the Edge uniform system, the third jersey program returned in full earnest for the 2008–09 season. The Winter and Heritage Classics became showcases for throwback uniforms and new sweaters with a throwback aesthetic, while the NHL Stadium Series became a showcase for more radical uniform designs. Third jerseys as a whole began to skew more to traditional stylings and throwback designs, especially for teams who more modernized looks in the Edge redesign. Another trend has been for teams to include an off-white cream colour, sometimes referred to as "vintage white" or "antique white", in place of pure white on their third or Classic jersey, attempting to replicate the discoloured appearance of a genuine aged sweater. This trend picked up after the Minnesota Wild began extensively using "Minnesota wheat", an official team colour similar to the vintage cream colour, in place of white trim on their dark jerseys.

The Detroit Red Wings were the last team in the NHL to introduce an alternate jersey. They added an alternate jersey in celebration of their 100th season for the 2025-26 season. The Montreal Canadiens have only had one season with an official alternate jersey; the 2006-07 season they used throwbacks of their 1944-47 white jerseys.

Prior to 2021, the New Jersey Devils have eschewed the concept of third jerseys under general manager Lou Lamoriello. Instead, they wore special one-off alternates that were throwbacks of the classic red and green jerseys for one home game on or around St. Patrick's Day every season since 2009–10, with the exception of the lockout-shortened 2013 season, and have also worn them in their 2014 NHL Stadium Series outdoor game. However, in 2021, the Devils finally unveiled their first full-time third jersey, using black as the base color.

With Reebok being replaced by parent company Adidas as the NHL's uniform supplier for the 2017–18 NHL season, the third jersey program once again went on hiatus for one year. Like what happened during the Reebok transition, alternate jerseys returned for the 2018–19 season.

==== Usage ====
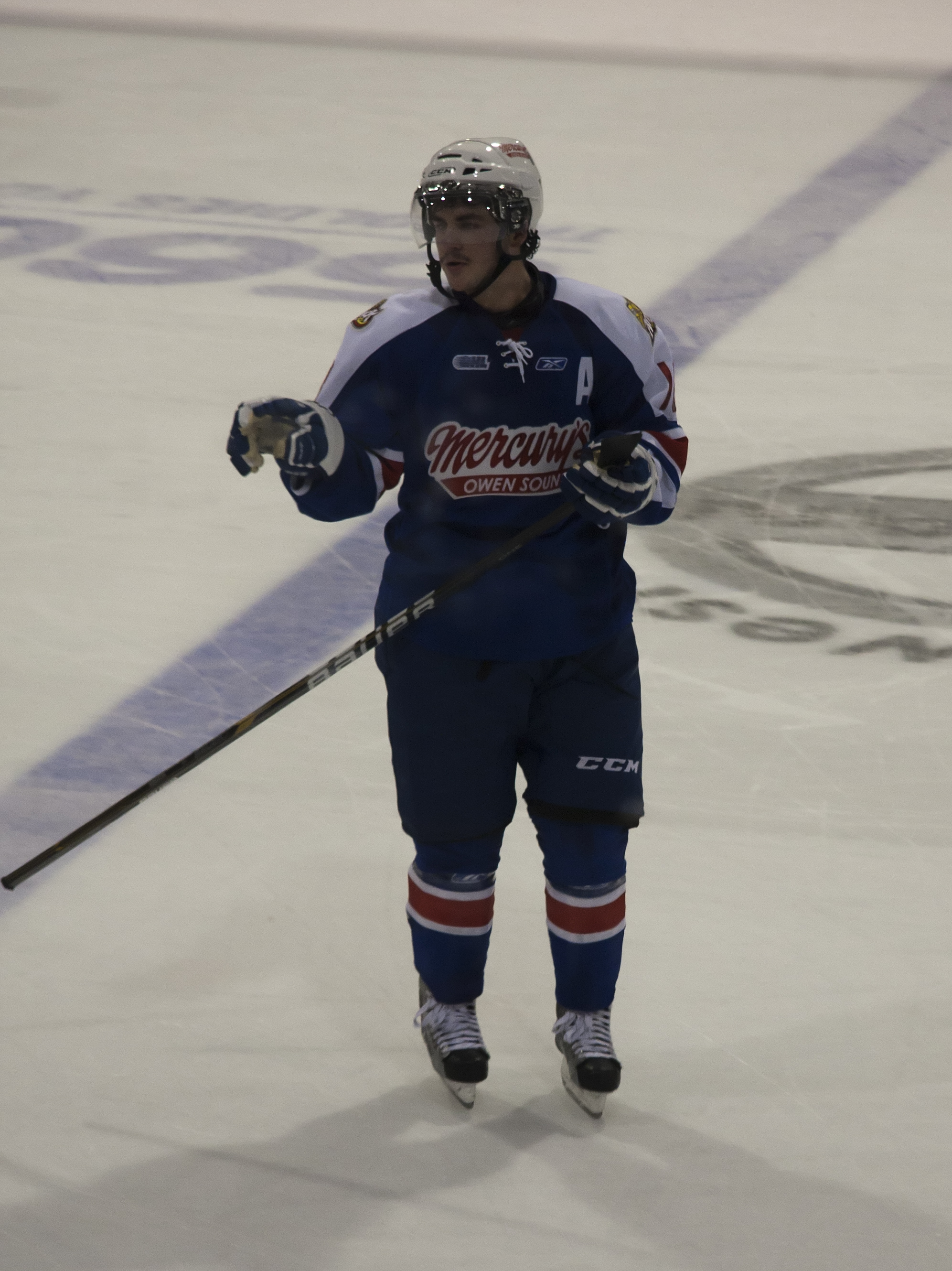
Owen Sound Attack's Joey Hishon wearing a third uniform in the Ontario Hockey League

Once a team has been granted permission by the league to use their new design, they will request and be allowed ten to fifteen games during the season in which they may use their third sweater. They may continue to use the third sweater in subsequent years as well. This alternate design allowed the team's appearance to flirt with radical designs which have occasionally gone on to become the new looks for some of the participating teams, though they can also be quite garish. An infamous example is the aforementioned St. Louis Blues' planned third sweater from 1996. The Mighty Ducks' third from that season, featuring mascot Wildwing bursting through a sheet of ice, was also considered particularly garish. Sales of third sweaters to fans have also provided significant additional income for cash-strapped NHL teams. For example, in 2013, the Calgary Flames introduced a third sweater in exactly the same colours as their primary home sweater, but with the addition of "western styling" mixed with traditional hockey sweater features such as laces and the team name in script on the front. This doesn't always work; in the case of the Flames, they reverted to their throwback third jersey in the 2016–17 season.

Teams are also allowed to wear their third jerseys as often as desired in the Stanley Cup Playoffs; however, they may only wear two different uniforms during the playoffs (one at home and one on the road). Examples of teams who wore third jerseys in the playoffs include the New York Rangers (in 1997), the Dallas Stars (in 1999 and 2026), the San Jose Sharks (from 2011 to 2014), the Anaheim Ducks (in 2014), the Minnesota Wild (from 2013 to 2017), the Washington Capitals (in 2015), the Toronto Maple Leafs (in 1999), the Philadelphia Flyers (in 2001 and 2009), the Pittsburgh Penguins (in 1997, 2016, and 2021), the Edmonton Oilers (in 2017 and 2021), the Calgary Flames (in 2019), the Arizona Coyotes (in 2020), and the Carolina Hurricanes (in 2019, 2020, and 2021). The Ducks, Stars, Flyers, Penguins, Oilers, Wild, Flames, and Coyotes are also examples of teams wearing third jerseys in the playoffs that are then promoted to full-time jerseys the following season.

==== Chronology ====
Several teams have had multiple designs of their third jersey.

- 1955–56: Boston Bruins (remained until end of 1956–57 season; brought back for 1959–60 season and stayed until end of 1964–65 season)
- 1966–67: Toronto Maple Leafs (inspired by Canada's Centennial celebrations in 1967, the Leafs had a completely different uniform set for that year's Stanley Cup playoffs, which culminated with a Stanley Cup victory. The modified Leafs uniform featured a new Maple Leaf emblem, replacing the traditional maple leaf with a design imitating the leaf found on Canada's new Maple Leaf Flag introduced in 1965. This uniform was adopted by the team the following season (1967–68) and remained until a completely new uniform design was unveiled for the 1970–71 season.)
- 1981–82: Pittsburgh Penguins (remained until 1984–1985 season)
- 1991–92: Boston Bruins, Chicago Blackhawks, Detroit Red Wings, Montreal Canadiens, New York Rangers, Toronto Maple Leafs (all as throwback/vintage jerseys)
- 1993–94: Chicago Blackhawks and Detroit Red Wings (one game, wearing the 1992 throwback/vintage jerseys)
- 1995–96: Mighty Ducks of Anaheim, Boston Bruins (through 2005–06), Los Angeles Kings, Pittsburgh Penguins (through 1996–97; would eventually become their regular road jersey), Vancouver Canucks (through 1996–97)
- 1996–97: Chicago Blackhawks (used through 2006–07), New York Islanders (third and fourth jerseys with classic logo, became full-time home and road shirts the following season), New York Rangers (through 2006–07), Tampa Bay Lightning (through 1998–99), Toronto Maple Leafs (one game – throwback/vintage jerseys)
- 1997–98: Mighty Ducks of Anaheim (through 1999–2000), Dallas Stars (through 1998–99; became road jersey afterward), Ottawa Senators (through 1998–99; became road jersey afterward), Philadelphia Flyers (through 2000–01; became road jersey afterward), St. Louis Blues (became home jersey the following season), San Jose Sharks (became road jersey the following season), Washington Capitals (through 1999–2000; became road jersey afterward)
- 1998–99: Calgary Flames (through 1999–2000; became road jersey through 2003; third jersey again 2003–06), Florida Panthers (through 2002–03; became the new home jersey, replaced by former road jersey), New York Rangers (white shirt replaced blue third for one season), Phoenix Coyotes (through 2002–03), Toronto Maple Leafs (through 2006–07)
- 1999–2000: Los Angeles Kings (retired prior to 2007–08 season; logos switched in 2002–03)
- 2000–01: Buffalo Sabres (through 2005–06), Ottawa Senators (through 2006–07), Pittsburgh Penguins (through 2001–02; became home uniform after one season)
- 2001–02: Colorado Avalanche (through 2006–07), Edmonton Oilers (designed by Todd McFarlane; through 2006–07), Nashville Predators (through 2006–07), San Jose Sharks (through 2006–07), Vancouver Canucks (through 2005–06)
- 2002–03: New York Islanders (through 2006–07), Philadelphia Flyers (orange with 3D version of logo, through 2006–07)
- 2003–04: Mighty Ducks of Anaheim (through 2005–06), Atlanta Thrashers (would become home jersey), Boston Bruins (c.1970 – vintage program) Columbus Blue Jackets (became home jersey for 2007–08), Dallas Stars (used through 2005–06), Edmonton Oilers (c.1988 – vintage program), Florida Panthers (former road jersey, through 2006–07), Los Angeles Kings (c.1987 – vintage program), Minnesota Wild (became home jersey for 2007–08); Montreal Canadiens (c.1946 and c.1960 versions – vintage program – 1946 version used through 2006–07), New York Rangers (c.1978 – vintage program), St. Louis Blues (c.1979 – vintage program) Vancouver Canucks (c.1976 – vintage program; worn as fourth in 2005–06, in use as third in 2006–07).
- 2006–07: Boston Bruins (1960s throwback), Buffalo Sabres
- 2007–08: No teams were allowed to have alternate jerseys due to the introduction of the Reebok Edge jersey style. During the NHL playoffs, the Toronto Maple Leafs announced they would wear jerseys similar in design to the ones worn during their 1967 Stanley Cup run, but this did not occur because the Maple Leafs failed to reach a playoff spot during the regular season. The Pittsburgh Penguins (1968–76 blue throwback) and the Buffalo Sabres (1970–96 white throwback) were therefore the only two teams to wear their third jerseys, which happened in the Winter Classic.
- 2008–09: On September 10, 2008, the Carolina Hurricanes unveiled a new predominantly black third jersey featuring a flag design reminiscent of the maritime advisory flag system. The following teams announced the use of third jerseys for the 2008–09 NHL season: Atlanta Thrashers, Boston Bruins, Buffalo Sabres, Chicago Blackhawks (a vintage jersey for the 2009 NHL Winter Classic at Wrigley Field), Dallas Stars, Detroit Red Wings (for the 2009 Winter Classic), Edmonton Oilers, Los Angeles Kings, New York Islanders, Ottawa Senators, Philadelphia Flyers, Phoenix Coyotes, Pittsburgh Penguins, San Jose Sharks, St. Louis Blues, Tampa Bay Lightning, Toronto Maple Leafs, Vancouver Canucks. To commemorate its 100th season, Montreal Canadiens wear vintage jerseys from seasons 1912–13, 1915–16 and 1945–46 during selected home games against Original Six teams.
- 2009–10: Montreal Canadiens announce in Fall 2008 they will wear vintage jerseys from seasons 1909–10 and 1910–11 during selected home games against Original Six teams to commemorate the 100th anniversary of the team. In addition, the Bruins and Flyers donned vintage jerseys for their game as part of the 2010 NHL Winter Classic at Fenway Park on January 1, and the Flyers then changed to the Winter Classic white sweater as their away jersey for the 2010–11 season; new third jerseys in the 2009–10 NHL season were worn by the Calgary Flames, Colorado Avalanche, Florida Panthers, Minnesota Wild and the Nashville Predators. The Blackhawks also debuted a new third jersey which is a variation of the Winter Classic jersey used in 2009.
- 2010–11: The Buffalo Sabres and the New York Islanders are officially changing to the third as their home (and a new white road uniform based on same) for the 2010–11 season. Buffalo introduced a new third jersey loosely based on their AHL predecessor, the Buffalo Bisons, to celebrate the team's 40th anniversary. The Columbus Blue Jackets have introduced a new third jersey, wearing it on selective home and away games only. The Anaheim Ducks also introduced a new third jersey as well along with their home and away jerseys. The Los Angeles Kings unveiled a new fourth throwback jersey, which is based on their purple and gold jerseys worn from 1967 to 1979. The Pittsburgh Penguins retired their powder blue alternates and unveiled their new third jersey at the 2011 NHL Winter Classic at Heinz Field. On November 12, 2010, the New York Rangers introduced a new heritage jersey in a celebration of their 85th anniversary, which is worn during home games against Original Six teams and on all Sunday (later Saturday) home games. The Rangers' heritage jersey debuted on November 17 in a game against the Bruins. The Anaheim Ducks introduced a third sweater on November 26. The jersey features the "D" duck foot logo on the front and the colours are primarily black and orange. On the shoulder of the jersey, there is a patch of the Mighty Duck logo which was no longer used in the 2006–07 NHL season with the logo the Ducks are currently using.
- 2011–12: The Los Angeles Kings relegated their purple and black road jerseys as alternates, while assigning the black and silver jerseys to regular use at home. They made a white and black away jersey based on this design. The Ottawa Senators replaced their black "SENS" alternates with a retro barberpole design based on the original Senators jerseys. The Pittsburgh Penguins and Washington Capitals promoted their 2011 Winter Classic jerseys to third jersey status, while the Toronto Maple Leafs unveiled a new blue retro alternate based on the jersey worn when they won the 1967 Stanley Cup Finals. Even though the Tampa Bay Lightning unveiled new logos and uniforms, their alternate "BOLTS" uniform was retained. The New York Islanders added a black jersey as their alternate, which was retired towards the end of the 2013–14 season.
- 2012–13: No third jerseys were unveiled in the lockout-shortened season, but the Buffalo Sabres, Edmonton Oilers and Florida Panthers dropped their third jerseys.
- 2013–14: The Buffalo Sabres unveiled their two-tone third jersey, with the front of the jersey in gold and the back of the jersey in navy. The Calgary Flames replaced their classic 1980s third jerseys (which are now worn once per season) with a red and black jersey featuring a throwback 'Calgary' script and modern design features (it would be replaced with the former jerseys after the 2015–16 season). The Carolina Hurricanes retained their black third jerseys despite unveiling a new uniform set, while the third jerseys of the Los Angeles Kings and Pittsburgh Penguins were dropped.
- 2014–15: The Anaheim Ducks promoted their third jerseys to regular use at home, adding a new white uniform based on the same design. The Pittsburgh Penguins unveiled their new black and gold third jersey, which is based on their road uniforms worn from 1980 to 1992. In addition, the Philadelphia Flyers promoted the jersey they wore at the 2012 Winter Classic to alternate status. After retiring their black third jersey towards the end of the 2013–14 season, the New York Islanders added a blue alternate jersey, which was previously worn at the Stadium Series game at Yankee Stadium in the previous season. The Tampa Bay Lightning changed their third jersey to a black alternate, while the Los Angeles Kings and Arizona Coyotes unveiled new throwback jerseys, the latter replacing their black third jersey.
- 2015–16: The Anaheim Ducks introduced a new orange third jersey. The Edmonton Oilers introduced a new throwback alternate orange jersey, while the Vancouver Canucks added a black throwback jersey that was the team's road uniform from 1989 to 1997. The Washington Capitals added a red alternate jersey based on the white alternate jersey they used from the 2011–12 to the 2014–15 seasons. In addition, the Colorado Avalanche and the New York Islanders changed their alternate jerseys. The two-tone third jersey worn by the Buffalo Sabres was permanently discontinued; in its place, a "third jersey" identical to the white away jersey was used for six home games (technically it was the same jersey, but as previously noted it required special dispensation from the league to allow it).
- 2016–17: The Pittsburgh Penguins' third jersey that was worn during the 2014–15 and 2015–16 seasons was promoted to regular use at home; while the Boston Bruins replaced their third jersey with the jersey that was first worn at the 2016 NHL Winter Classic. The Los Angeles Kings and Philadelphia Flyers introduced special third jerseys, while the St. Louis Blues removed their third jerseys.
- 2017–18: No teams were allowed to have regular alternate jerseys due to the introduction of the Adidas jersey style. However, teams participating in outdoor games (the NHL 100 Classic, Winter Classic, and Stadium Series games) had special uniforms for those games. In addition, the Toronto Maple Leafs wore a Toronto Arenas throwback for the Next Century Game, commemorating the 100th anniversary of the first game in NHL history.
- 2018–19: The following teams announced the use of third jerseys for the 2018–19: the Anaheim Ducks, the Arizona Coyotes, the Calgary Flames, the Carolina Hurricanes, the Colorado Avalanche, the Columbus Blue Jackets, the Edmonton Oilers, the New Jersey Devils, the New York Islanders, the Ottawa Senators, the Philadelphia Flyers, the Pittsburgh Penguins, the San Jose Sharks, the St. Louis Blues, the Washington Capitals and the Winnipeg Jets. The Boston Bruins and Chicago Blackhawks wore throwback jerseys during the 2019 NHL Winter Classic. The Carolina Hurricanes announced that they would wear green Hartford Whalers jerseys for select games against the Boston Bruins during the 2018–19 season.
- 2019–20: The Boston Bruins, the Edmonton Oilers, and the Vancouver Canucks added new third jerseys. Special throwback uniform designs were worn by the Buffalo Sabres, the Calgary Flames, the Dallas Stars, the Los Angeles Kings, the Nashville Predators, and the Winnipeg Jets for a few games during the season.
- 2020–21: NHL began partnering with Adidas to introduce the Reverse Retro program, where all 31 teams are issued special uniforms which are based on throwback jerseys that were worn during previous seasons. Several teams, including the Arizona Coyotes, the Boston Bruins, the Carolina Hurricanes, the Columbus Blue Jackets, the Los Angeles Kings, the Minnesota Wild, the Montreal Canadiens, the New Jersey Devils, the San Jose Sharks, and the St. Louis Blues, received uniforms that swapped the colour palettes. The introduction of the Reverse Retro jerseys marks the first time in history that all 31 teams have at least three jerseys. In addition to the introduction of the Reverse Retro series, the Dallas Stars, the Vegas Golden Knights, and the Washington Capitals introduced new fourth jerseys, while the throwback uniform of the Calgary Flames was promoted to a home uniform and the old home uniform was relegated to a fourth jersey; the third jerseys of the Buffalo Sabres and the Ottawa Senators were redesigned into Reverse Retro jerseys as part of those teams introducing new wholesale uniform sets.
- 2021–22: New third jerseys were unveiled for the Los Angeles Kings, New Jersey Devils, Pittsburgh Penguins, Toronto Maple Leafs, and Winnipeg Jets. In addition, the Arizona Coyotes' previous "coyote head" home jersey was relegated to a third jersey.
- 2022–23: A second set of Reverse Retro jerseys were introduced. The Buffalo Sabres, Calgary Flames, Carolina Hurricanes, and Vancouver Canucks unveiled modernized versions of 1990s-era throwback jerseys, while the Arizona Coyotes unveiled a new red alternate jersey.
- 2023–24: The Anaheim Ducks and Boston Bruins wore anniversary-specific third jerseys for the season. The Minnesota Wild brought back their Minnesota North Stars-inspired green and gold "Reverse Retro" jersey as an alternate, and the New York Rangers, San Jose Sharks and Tampa Bay Lightning unveiled new alternate jerseys.
- 2024–25: Unlike in previous instances where new jersey styles were introduced, existing third jerseys were permitted to be retained as part of the introduction of the Fanatics jersey style, but no new third jersey designs could be introduced during the season. However, teams participating in outdoor games received special jerseys. As part of these changes, the Anaheim Ducks, Edmonton Oilers, Los Angeles Kings, and New York Islanders retired their third jerseys. The Washington Capitals wore an anniversary-specific throwback jersey for a limited number of games during the season.
- 2025–26: The Chicago Blackhawks, Detroit Red Wings, and New York Rangers wore anniversary-specific third jerseys for the season. The Dallas Stars replaced their alternate jersey with one based on their "Reverse Retro" jersey from 2020-21. After no third jerseys were used by the Edmonton Oilers and the Ottawa Senators in the previous season, both teams introduced alternate heritage-inspired uniforms, while the New Jersey Devils (effective in 2026–27), Philadelphia Flyers, and Toronto Maple Leafs retired their third jerseys. New alternate jerseys were also introduced by the Pittsburgh Penguins and the Washington Capitals to replace their existing designs.

== Rugby league ==
=== National Rugby League ===
In recent years the third jersey has appeared in the Australian NRL, with every team having a 'home' jersey, an 'away' jersey and a 'heritage' jersey. The NRL does not currently require third or alternate jerseys, because most clashes can be resolved with away jerseys or using modified under-20s jerseys.

- South Sydney Rabbitohs used a white jersey (the under-20s away jersey) against Canberra in 2008, even though the NRL stated that the Souths and Canberra jerseys don't clash. They have a similar jersey for 2009 which contains tribal Aboriginal and Maori designs.
- Parramatta Eels have adopted a home (yellow with blue designs), away (blue with yellow designs, however in 2007 this was the alternate) and alternate (white with yellow designs, however in 2007 was away) jersey scheme. They (along with Manly-Warringah and Illawarra) were one of the pioneers of away jerseys in rugby league in Australia.
- Canterbury Bulldogs use a jersey reminiscent of their training jersey as a clash strip (also their under-20s away jersey). They also wear their Berries strip from the 1960s as a heritage strip and a similar (yet quite different) jersey (white with blue and black butcher stripes) for trials.
- Brisbane Broncos have been known to wear a blue and aqua alternate jersey, however, it is rare to see as blue has become a colour hated by Queensland rugby league fans.
- Wests Tigers have worn a white version of their 2008 home jersey, switching the white/orange areas, and introduced a "10 Year Anniversary" jersey, which is white with black and orange V's. They also wear modernised versions of the old Balmain Tigers and Western Suburbs Magpies strips from the 1980s.
- Though not technically third jumpers, the Centenary of Rugby League celebrations left all teams with special jerseys for the Centenary round, and in 2009 several teams wore the same jerseys (the Newcastle Knights, however, wore their foundation strip, in 2008 they wore a Newcastle Rebels jersey, which was the first Newcastle team in the NSWRL and played in the NSWRL's foundation season. The New Zealand Warriors wore a jersey symbolising the history of rugby league in Auckland, with a dark blue jersey with 2 white V's, while the Melbourne Storm wore their 2000's light purple with white lightning bolts away strip in the 2009 Heritage Round, while in 2008 they wore their foundation jersey with V's).
- As a result of the above point, the Sydney Roosters have used five jerseys in 2008.

== See also ==
- Away colours
- Throwback uniform
