= Doege (surname) =

Doege is a surname. Notable people with the surname include:

- Jarret Doege, American football player
- Karl Walter Doege (1867–1932), one of the first people to describe Doege–Potter syndrome
- Seth Doege (born 1988), American football coach
- Steven Doege (born 1991), Canadian football player
