= Mike Benevides =

Canadian gridiron football coach (born 1968)

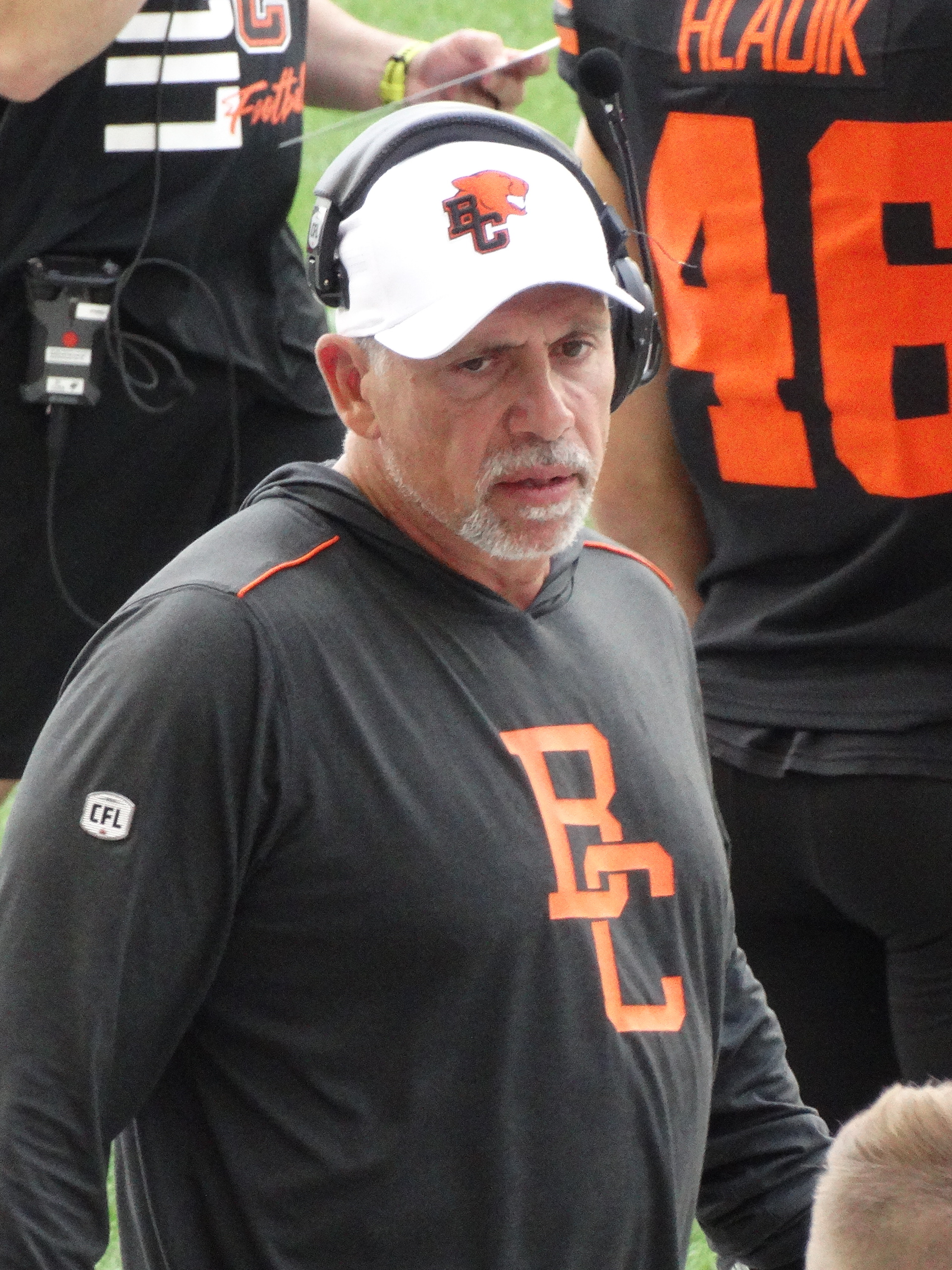
- Benevides with the BC Lions in 2023

BC Lions
- Title: Special teams coordinator

Personal information
- Born: May 3, 1968 (age 58); Toronto, Ontario, Canada

Career information
- College: Bakersfield
- University: York

Career history
- 2000: Calgary Stampeders (Def. asst.)
- 2001–2002: Calgary Stampeders (STC/LC)
- 2003–2007: BC Lions (STC/LC)
- 2008–2011: BC Lions (DC/LC)
- 2012–2014: BC Lions (HC)
- 2016–2017: Edmonton Eskimos (Asst. HC/DC)
- 2018: Edmonton Eskimos (Asst. HC/DC/LC)
- 2020–2022: Ottawa Redblacks (DC)
- 2023–2024: BC Lions (ST)
- 2025–present: BC Lions (DC)

Awards and highlights
- 89th Grey Cup champion; 94th Grey Cup champion; 99th Grey Cup champion

Mike Benevides (born May 3, 1968) is a professional Canadian football coach who is currently serving as the defensive coordinator for the BC Lions of the Canadian Football League (CFL). Benevides was the head coach for the Lions from 2012 though 2014. He has also been the defensive coordinator and assistant head coach for the Edmonton Eskimos and defensive coordinator for the Ottawa Redblacks. He played college football at the defensive tackle position for the Bakersfield College Renegades before transferring to York University to play for the Yeomen.

== Professional career ==
=== Calgary Stampeders ===
Benevides began his coaching career with the Calgary Stampeders in 2000 as a defensive assistant. He spent the following two seasons as the Stampeders' special teams and linebackers coach.

=== BC Lions ===
Benevides then became the special teams and linebackers coach for the BC Lions in 2003. He was eventually promoted to defensive coordinator and eventually head coach in 2012. Benevides spent three seasons with the Lions as the team's head coach, winning 33 games and losing 21. Under his leadership the Lions made the playoffs each season, but lost every time. Following the 2014 season he was fired by the Lions on November 20, 2014.

=== Edmonton Eskimos ===
On January 14, 2016, the Edmonton Eskimos named Benevides their assistant head coach and defensive coordinator. On December 7, 2018, the Eskimos released Mike Benevides from his duties.

=== Ottawa Redblacks ===
After spending a year working for TSN, Benevides was announced as the defensive coordinator for the Ottawa Redblacks on December 17, 2019. He served in that capacity for two seasons, but was not retained following a coaching change for the 2023 season.

=== BC Lions (II) ===
On May 30, 2023, the Lions announced that Benevides had returned to the club as their special teams consultant. On January 2, 2025, it was announced that Benevides had been named the defensive coordinator for the Lions.

== CFL coaching record ==
Team	Year	Regular season					Postseason		
Team	Year	Won	Lost	Ties	Win %	Finish	Won	Lost	Result
BC	2012	13	5	0	.722	1st in West Division	0	1	Lost in West Final
BC	2013	11	7	0	.611	3rd in West Division	0	1	Lost in West Semi-Final
BC	2014	9	9	0	.500	4th in West Division	0	1	Lost in East Semi-Final
Total		33	21	0	.611	1 Division; Championship	0	3	0 Grey Cups
