= Rory Kohlert =

Canadian football wide receiver

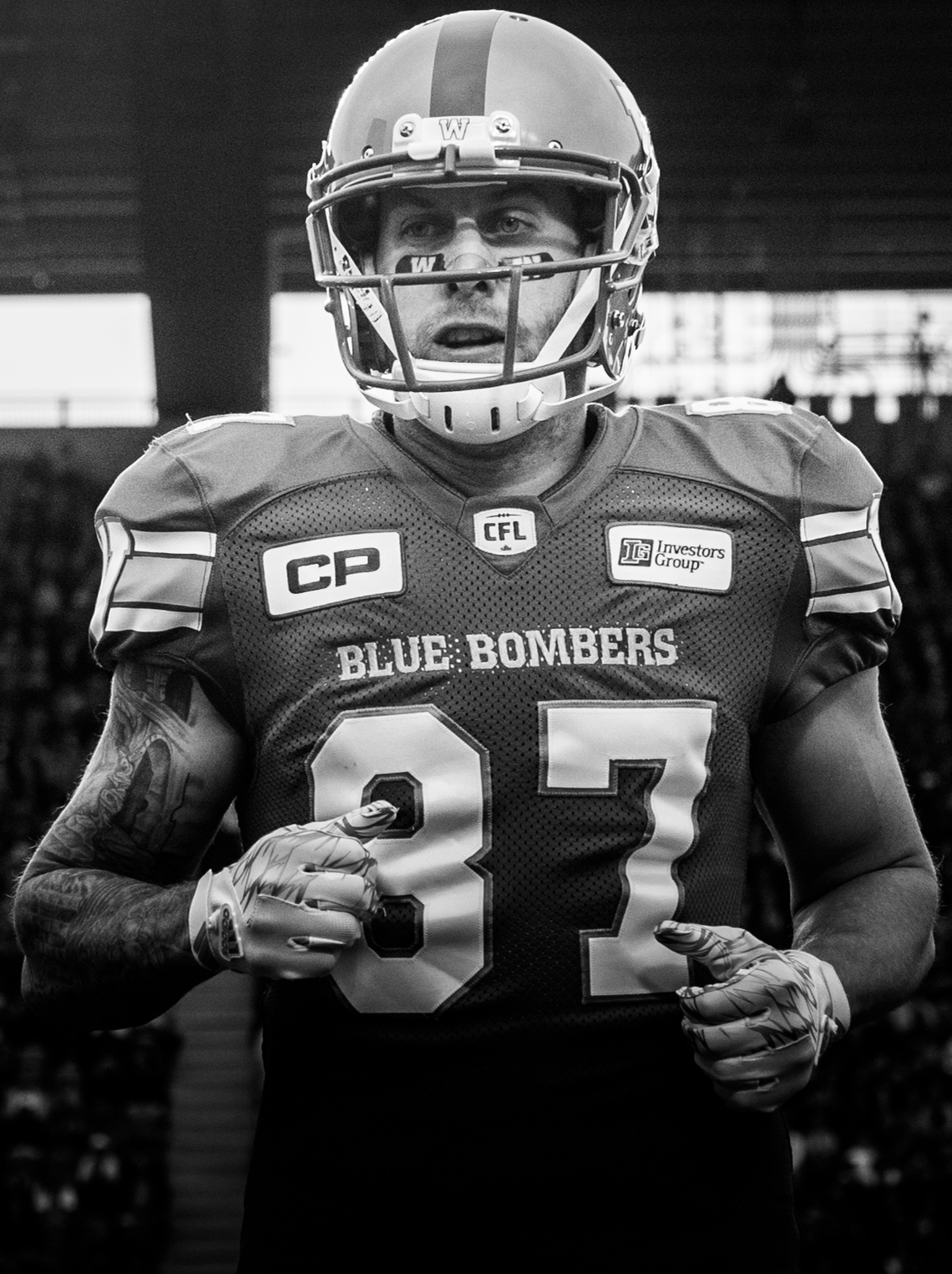
- Kohlert with the Winnipeg Blue Bombers in 2016

Profile
- Position: Wide receiver

Personal information
- Born: January 7, 1988 (age 38); Regina, Saskatchewan, Canada
- Listed height: 6 ft 2 in (1.88 m)
- Listed weight: 203 lb (92 kg)

Career information
- College: Saskatchewan
- CFL draft: 2009: undrafted
- Expansion draft: 2013: 3rd round

Career history
- 2011: Hamilton Tiger-Cats*
- 2012–2013: Winnipeg Blue Bombers
- 2014: Ottawa Redblacks*
- 2014–2016: Winnipeg Blue Bombers
- 2017: Calgary Stampeders
- 2018: Edmonton Eskimos*
- * Offseason or practice squad member only
- Stats at CFL.ca

Rory Kohlert (born January 7, 1988) is a Canadian former professional football wide receiver who played for six seasons in the Canadian Football League (CFL). He was originally signed as an undrafted free agent by the Hamilton Tiger-Cats on March 2, 2011, and was released on July 25, 2011. After returning to the Huskies in 2011, Kohlert signed with the Blue Bombers on March 23, 2012. On December 16, 2013, Kohlert was drafted by the Ottawa Redblacks in the 2013 CFL Expansion Draft, but re-signed with Winnipeg on February 11, 2014 after he became a free agent. After two seasons with the Blue Bombers, Kohlert signed a contract with the Calgary Stampeders for the 2017 season. He played CIS football with the Saskatchewan Huskies.
