= John Delahunt =

Canadian football player (born 1987)

Profile
- Position: Fullback

Personal information
- Born: May 10, 1987 (age 39); Ottawa, Ontario, Canada
- Listed height: 6 ft 3 in (1.91 m)
- Listed weight: 243 lb (110 kg)

Career information
- College: Connecticut
- CFL draft: 2012: undrafted
- Expansion draft: 2013: 2nd round

Career history
- 2013: Hamilton Tiger-Cats
- 2014: Ottawa Redblacks
- 2017: Edmonton Eskimos
- Stats at CFL.ca

John Delahunt (born May 10, 1987) is a Canadian former professional football fullback of the Canadian Football League. He was signed as an undrafted free agent by the Hamilton Tiger-Cats on May 28, 2013. He played college football for the Connecticut Huskies.

On December 16, 2013, Delahunt was drafted by the Ottawa Redblacks in the 2013 CFL Expansion Draft.
