= 2013 CFL expansion draft =

General information
- Date: December 16, 2013

Overview
- League: Canadian Football League
- Expansion team: Ottawa Redblacks
- Expansion season: 2014

The 2013 Canadian Football League Expansion Draft was a three-round CFL draft that took place on Monday December 16, 2013. It was designed to assign players from existing CFL teams to the expansion Ottawa Redblacks. The structure of the draft was announced on January 19, 2011, which described one round for selecting import players and two rounds for selecting non-import players. Additionally, the Redblacks were given the last pick in each of the first four rounds of the 2013 CFL draft and will also be given the first pick in every round of the 2014 CFL draft.

Overall, 24 players were selected in the draft, including two quarterbacks, three receivers, one running back, two fullbacks, six offensive linemen, six defensive linemen, three linebackers, and one defensive back. Only one pending free agent was selected, with Rory Kohlert's contract expiring February 15, 2014.

The draft was originally planned for 2012, but with lawsuits and delays pushing the opening day of the remodelled Frank Clair Stadium back to at least 2014, the draft was postponed.

== Rules of the Draft ==
Ottawa had the right to select three players from each of the eight existing teams for a total of 24 players. These selections were composed of eight import players and 16 non-import players with quarterbacks, kickers and punters eligible within their respective import/non-import categories. Ottawa was able to select a maximum of two quarterbacks and one kicker/punter, but could not select any of these three players from the same team. The CFL Commissioner would resolve any dispute related to player eligibility for the Expansion Draft process.

== Round one: Import Draft ==
Existing teams were able to protect one quarterback and ten additional import players, while Ottawa was only being able to select, at maximum, two quarterbacks in the draft. If a quarterback was selected from a team, that team could protect an additional two non-import players in the first round of the Non-Import Draft. If a kicker or punter was selected from a team, that team could protect one additional non-import player in the first round of the Non-Import Draft. Ottawa selected one import player from each existing team in this round.

Pick #	Player	Position	Original CFL team
1	Kevin Glenn	Quarterback	Calgary Stampeders
2	Thomas DeMarco	Quarterback	BC Lions
3	Moton Hopkins	Defensive line	Montreal Alouettes
4	Jonathan Williams	Defensive Line	Toronto Argonauts
5	Chevon Walker	Running back	Hamilton Tiger-Cats
6	Wallace Miles	Wide receiver	Winnipeg Blue Bombers
7	James Lee	Offensive line	Saskatchewan Roughriders
8	Carlton Mitchell	Wide Receiver	Edmonton Eskimos

== Round two: Non-Import Draft ==
Existing teams were able to protect six total non-import players, including the team's one protected quarterback and one protected kicker/punter. If a quarterback was selected in the Import Draft, eight total non-import players could be protected. If a kicker or punter was selected in the Import Draft, seven total non-import players could be protected. If a non-import kicker or punter was to be selected, it must be done in this round and, if so, that team was able to protect an additional two non-import players in the second round of the Non-Import Draft. Ottawa selected one non-import player from each existing team in this round.

Pick #	Player	Position	Original CFL team
9	Patrick Lavoie	Fullback	Montreal Alouettes
10	James Green	Linebacker	Winnipeg Blue Bombers
11	Keith Shologan	Defensive lineman	Saskatchewan Roughriders
12	Joe Eppele	Offensive lineman	Toronto Argonauts
13	John Delahunt	Fullback	Hamilton Tiger-Cats
14	Alexander Krausnick-Groh	Offensive lineman	Edmonton Eskimos
15	J'Michael Deane	Offensive lineman	Calgary Stampeders
16	Matthew Albright	Offensive lineman	BC Lions

== Round three: Non-Import Draft ==
Existing teams were able to protect six more non-import players in addition to those that were protected in the second round. If a kicker or punter was selected in the Non-Import Draft, eight more non-import players could be protected. Ottawa selected one non-import player from each existing team in this round.

Pick #	Player	Position	Original CFL team
17	Marwan Hage	Centre	Hamilton Tiger-Cats
18	Eric Fraser	Safety	Calgary Stampeders
19	Jason Pottinger	Linebacker	Toronto Argonauts
20	Rory Kohlert	Wide receiver	Winnipeg Blue Bombers
21	Justin Capicciotti	Defensive lineman	Edmonton Eskimos
22	Zack Evans	Defensive lineman	Saskatchewan Roughriders
23	Andrew Marshall	Defensive lineman	BC Lions
24	Jordan Verdone	Linebacker	Montreal Alouettes
