= Matthew Albright =

Canadian football player (born 1991)

No. 53
- Position: Offensive lineman

Personal information
- Born: September 14, 1991 (age 35); Dartmouth, Nova Scotia, Canada
- Listed height: 6 ft 5 in (1.96 m)
- Listed weight: 330 lb (150 kg)

Career information
- University: Saint Mary's
- CFL draft: 2013: 5th round, 42nd overall pick
- Expansion draft: 2013: 2nd round

Career history
- 2013: BC Lions
- 2014–2017: Ottawa Redblacks

Awards and highlights
- Grey Cup champion (2016)
- Stats at CFL.ca

Matthew Albright (born September 14, 1991) is a Canadian former professional football offensive lineman who played in the Canadian Football League (CFL). He was drafted 42nd overall in the 2013 CFL draft by the BC Lions and signed with the club on May 27, 2013. He played CIS football for the Saint Mary's Huskies where he was the AUS nominee in 2012 for the Russ Jackson Award. He played high school football at Prince Andrew High School in Dartmouth, Nova Scotia.

== Professional career ==
On December 16, 2013, Albright was drafted by the Ottawa Redblacks in the second round of the 2013 CFL Expansion Draft. Nonetheless, he spent his first season in the CFL with the BC Lions. Following the 2013 season Albright returned to the team that drafted him. Matthew Albright was active for 14 games over the course of the next two seasons, and his contract was extended following the 2015 CFL season. He retired in February 2018.
