= Matt McGarva =

Canadian gridiron football player (born 1991)

Profile
- Position: Defensive back

Personal information
- Born: May 26, 1991 (age 35); Surrey, British Columbia
- Listed height: 5 ft 8 in (1.73 m)
- Listed weight: 200 lb (91 kg)

Career information
- University: Windsor
- CFL draft: 2013: 4th round, 33rd overall pick

Career history
- 2013–2014: BC Lions
- 2015: Toronto Argonauts*
- * Offseason or practice squad member only
- Stats at CFL.ca

Matt McGarva (born May 26, 1991) is a Canadian former professional football defensive back in the Canadian Football League (CFL). He was drafted 33rd overall in the 2013 CFL draft by the BC Lions and signed with the club on May 27, 2013. Following his release from the Lions, he was signed by the Argonauts on May 30, 2015. He was released by the Argonauts on June 20, 2015.

McGarva played CIS football with the Windsor Lancers.

McGarva is an active part of BC Lions community programs. Predominantly, he is an advocate for "Being More Than A Bystander" movement to eliminate gender violence. He is a public speaker for other Lions programs such as "Stand Up Against Bullying" and "Read, Write and Roar." McGarva works to build football communities through coaching Lord Tweedsmuir Secondary Senior Varsity football and helping run the "Windsor's Finest Football Academy" for under-privileged youth.
