= Steven Doege =

Canadian football player (born 1991)

Profile
- Position: Defensive end

Personal information
- Born: January 22, 1991 (age 35); Kelowna, British Columbia, Canada
- Listed height: 6 ft 3 in (1.91 m)
- Listed weight: 230 lb (104 kg)

Career information
- CJFL: Okanagan Sun

Career history
- 2012–2014: BC Lions
- Stats at CFL.ca (archive)

Steven Doege (born January 22, 1991) is a Canadian former professional football defensive end for the BC Lions of the Canadian Football League.

== Junior career ==
Doege played junior football with the Okanagan Sun.

== Professional career ==
Doege attended the Lions' 2012 training camp as a territorial exemption and spent time on the team's practice roster that year. He re-signed with the Lions on November 29, 2012. He played in seven regular season games over two seasons where he recorded one defensive tackle and three special teams tackles. He was later released in training camp on June 10, 2015.
