= 2012 Hamilton Tiger-Cats season =

Season of Canadian Football League team the Hamilton Tiger-Cats

- General manager: Bob O'Billovich
- Head coach: George Cortez
- Home stadium: Ivor Wynne Stadium

Results
- Record: 6–12
- Division place: 4th, East
- Playoffs: did not qualify
- Team MOP: Chris Williams
- Team MOC: Luca Congi
- Team MOR: Josh Bartel

Uniform

The 2012 Hamilton Tiger-Cats season was the 55th season for the team in the Canadian Football League (CFL) and their 63rd overall. The Tiger-Cats finished in fourth place in the East Division with a 6–12 record and missed the playoffs for the first time since 2008; this was despite the fact that the team scored more points in the 2012 season than any other CFL team (offset by the fact that they also gave up more points than any other CFL team).

== Offseason ==
=== CFL draft ===
The 2012 CFL draft took place on May 3, 2012 live at 3:00 PM EDT. The Tiger-Cats had seven selections in the six-round draft, including an additional third-round pick from the Arland Bruce trade.

Round	Pick	Player	Position	School/Club team
2	8	Courtney Stephen	DB	Northern Illinois
2	10	Frédéric Plesius	LB	Laval
2	13	Carson Rockhill	OL	Calgary
3	17	Arnaud Gascon-Nadon	DL	Laval
3	20	Michael Atkinson	DL	Boise State
4	25	Simon Charbonneau-Campeau	WR	Sherbrooke
5	33	Bo Palmer	SB	Simon Fraser

== Preseason ==
Week	Date	Opponent	Score	Result	Attendance	Record
A	Wed, June 13	vs. Toronto Argonauts	29–24	Loss	27,585	0–1
B	Wed, June 20	at Winnipeg Blue Bombers	26–25	Win	28,300	1–1

== Regular season ==
=== Season standings ===
East Division
Team	GP	W	L	T	PF	PA	Pts	
Montreal Alouettes	18	11	7	0	478	489	22	Details
Toronto Argonauts	18	9	9	0	445	491	18	Details
Winnipeg Blue Bombers	18	6	12	0	376	531	12	Details
Hamilton Tiger-Cats	18	6	12	0	538	576	12	Details

=== Season schedule ===
Week	Date	Opponent	Score	Result	Attendance	Record
1	Fri, June 29	vs. Saskatchewan Roughriders	43–16	Loss	25,682	0–1
2	Fri, July 6	at BC Lions	39–36	Loss	25,109	0–2
3	Sat, July 14	vs. Toronto Argonauts	36–27	Win	24,264	1–2
4	Sat, July 21	vs. Montreal Alouettes	39–24	Win	23,392	2–2
5	Sat, July 28	at Saskatchewan Roughriders	35–34	Win	32,898	3–2
6	Bye					3–2
7	Thurs, Aug 9	vs. Calgary Stampeders	31–20	Loss	22,635	3–3
8	Thurs, Aug 16	at Winnipeg Blue Bombers	32–25	Loss	27,039	3–4
9	Thurs, Aug 23	at Montreal Alouettes	31–29	Loss	22,140	3–5
10	Mon, Sept 3	vs. Toronto Argonauts	33–30	Loss	31,032	3–6
11	Sat, Sept 8	at Toronto Argonauts	45–31	Loss	31,061	3–7
12	Sat, Sept 15	vs. Edmonton Eskimos	51–8	Win	24,162	4–7
13	Fri, Sept 21	at Winnipeg Blue Bombers	34–12	Loss	26,577	4–8
14	Fri, Sept 28	vs. Montreal Alouettes	41–28	Win	23,784	5–8
15	Fri, Oct 5	at Edmonton Eskimos	35–20	Loss	30,557	5–9
16	Fri, Oct 12	vs. BC Lions	37–17	Loss	26,842	5–10
17	Sat, Oct 20	at Calgary Stampeders	34–32	Loss	26,502	5–11
18	Sat, Oct 27	vs. Winnipeg Blue Bombers	28–18	Win	29,722	6–11
19	Thurs, Nov 1	at Toronto Argonauts	43–40	Loss	27,283	6–12

== Roster ==
2012 Hamilton Tiger-Cats final roster
Quarterbacks: 1 Henry Burris; 18 Dan LeFevour; 12 Quinton Porter; Running backs: 0 Darcy Brown; 22 Avon Cobourne; 24 Daryl Stephenson; 29 Chevon Walker; Receivers: 85 Simon Charbonneau-Campeau; 83 Andy Fantuz; 11 Sam Giguère; 84 Bakari Grant; 89 Onrea Jones; 81 Aaron Kelly; 88 Dave Stala; 80 Chris Williams	Offensive linemen: 65 Pascal Baillargeon G; 63 Marc Dile T; 68 Mike Filer C/G; 57 Cody Husband T/G; 55 Tim O'Neill C/G; 59 Brian Simmons T; Defensive linemen: 91 Brandon Boudreaux DE; 99 Torrey Davis DT; 51 Marc-Antoine Fortin DE; 96 Terrence Moore DT; 90 Greg Peach DE; 95 Brandon Peguese DE; 97 Derrick Summers DT; Special teams: 44 Josh Bartel P; 7 Luca Congi K; 54 Kevin Scott LS	Linebackers: 48 Yannick Carter; 35 Kevin Eiben; 42 Dominique Harris; 45 Nathan Kanya; 25 Markeith Knowlton; 8 Renauld Williams; Defensive backs: 3 Marc Beswick; 26 Matt Bucknor; 27 Ricardo Colclough; 34 Ryan Hinds; 32 Chris Rwabukamba; 2 Bo Smith; 31 Geoff Tisdale; 5 Dee Webb	Reserve roster: 64 Nick Hennessey G; 23 Marcell Young DB; Practice roster: -- Nate Bussey LB; 66 Nick Claytor T; 37 Samuel Fournier FB; 53 Patrick Jean-Mary LB; -- Monte Lewis DE; -- Jason Medeiros G; 6 Armando Murillo DB; -- Sam Pope DB; 50 Seamus Postuma G; -- Bogdan Raic WR; 47 Louie Richardson LB; 20 Brandon Rutley RB; -- Chester Stewart QB	Injured list: 36 Isaac Brown LB; 33 Byron Bullock LB; 67 Peter Dyakowski G; 14 Nick Graham DB; 21 Terry Grant RB; 62 Marwan Hage C; 41 Jonathan Hood DB; 28 Jamall Johnson LB; 8 Martell Mallett RB; 94 Jermaine McElveen DT/DE; 98 Eddie Steele DT; 4 Carlos Thomas DB; Suspended: -- Branndon Braxton T; 79 Jordan Brescacin WR; -- Alex Henderson RB; Italics indicate International player
