= 2014 Calgary Stampeders season =

Canadian football team season

- Owner: Calgary Sports and Entertainment
- General manager: John Hufnagel
- Head coach: John Hufnagel
- Home stadium: McMahon Stadium

Results
- Record: 15–3
- Division place: 1st, West
- Playoffs: Won Grey Cup

Uniform

The 2014 Calgary Stampeders season was the 57th season for the team in the Canadian Football League (CFL) and their 80th overall. The Stampeders finished first in the West Division for the second straight season for the first time since the 1996 season. The Stampeders also finished the season with a 15–3 record, tying a team record previously achieved during the 1995 season (and has since been surpassed in 2016 with a 15–2–1 record). With a win in Week 15 the Stampeders qualified for the playoffs for the 10th straight season. On November 30, 2014, the Stampeders won their seventh Grey Cup championship 20–16 over the Hamilton Tiger-Cats at BC Place in Vancouver.

== Offseason ==
=== CFL draft ===
The 2014 CFL draft took place on May 13, 2014. The Stampeders had the most picks in the draft, including trading for the first overall pick in the draft and the rights to Marwan Hage for Jon Gott. Overall, the club had nine selections in the seven-round draft, with two first-round and three third-round picks.

Round	Pick	Player	Position	School/Club team
1	1	Pierre Lavertu	OL	Laval
1	7	Quinn Smith	DL	Concordia
2	16	Max Caron	LB	Concordia
3	19	Laurent Duvernay-Tardif	OL	McGill
3	24	Adam Thibault	DB	Laval
3	25	Joe Circelli	OL	Western
4	34	Derek Wiggan	DL	Queen's
5	40	Tyler Crapigna	K	McMaster
7	61	Brian Marshall	WR	Western

== Preseason ==
Week	Date	Kickoff	Opponent	Results		TV	Venue	Attendance	Summary
Week	Date	Kickoff	Opponent	Score	Record	TV	Venue	Attendance	Summary
A	Bye								
B	Sat, June 14	7:00 p.m. MDT	vs. Winnipeg Blue Bombers	W 23–20	1–0	TSN2	McMahon Stadium	27,103	Recap
C	Fri, June 20	8:00 p.m. MDT	at BC Lions	L 37–13	1–1	TSN	BC Place	26,445	Recap

== Regular season ==
=== Standings ===
West Division
Team	GP	W	L	T	PF	PA	Pts	
Calgary Stampeders	18	15	3	0	511	347	30	Details
Edmonton Eskimos	18	12	6	0	492	340	24	Details
Saskatchewan Roughriders	18	10	8	0	399	441	20	Details
BC Lions	18	9	9	0	380	365	18	Details
Winnipeg Blue Bombers	18	7	11	0	397	481	14	Details

=== Schedule ===
Week	Date	Kickoff	Opponent	Results		TV	Venue	Attendance	Summary
Week	Date	Kickoff	Opponent	Score	Record	TV	Venue	Attendance	Summary
1	Sat, June 28	1:00 p.m. MDT	vs. Montreal Alouettes	W 29–8	1–0	TSN/RDS/ESPN2	McMahon Stadium	26,135	Recap
2	Bye								
3	Sat, July 12	4:30 p.m. MDT	at Toronto Argonauts	W 34–15	2–0	TSN	Rogers Centre	16,102	Recap
4	Fri, July 18	8:00 p.m. MDT	vs. Hamilton Tiger-Cats	W 10–7	3–0	TSN/ESPN2	McMahon Stadium	27,546	Recap
5	Thur, July 24	7:00 p.m. MDT	at Edmonton Eskimos	W 26–22	4–0	TSN/ESPN2	Commonwealth Stadium	40,066	Recap
6	Fri, Aug 1	8:00 p.m. MDT	vs. BC Lions	L 24–25	4–1	TSN/ESPNews	McMahon Stadium	27,266	Recap
7	Sat, Aug 9	5:30 p.m. MDT	vs. Ottawa Redblacks	W 38–17	5–1	TSN/RDS	McMahon Stadium	28,391	Recap
8	Sat, Aug 16	1:00 p.m. MDT	at Hamilton Tiger-Cats	W 30–20	6–1	TSN	Ron Joyce Stadium	6,500	Recap
9	Sun, Aug 24	1:00 p.m. MDT	at Ottawa Redblacks	W 32–7	7–1	TSN	TD Place Stadium	24,327	Recap
10	Mon, Sept 1	2:30 p.m. MDT	vs. Edmonton Eskimos	W 28–13	8–1	TSN	McMahon Stadium	35,400	Recap
11	Sat, Sept 6	5:00 p.m. MDT	at Edmonton Eskimos	W 41–34	9–1	TSN/RDS2	Commonwealth Stadium	40,852	Recap
12	Sat, Sept 13	5:00 p.m. MDT	vs. Toronto Argonauts	W 40–33	10–1	TSN/RDS2	McMahon Stadium	28,607	Recap
13	Sun, Sept 21	11:00 a.m. MDT	at Montreal Alouettes	L 15–31	10–2	TSN/RDS/ESPN2	Molson Stadium	19,892	Recap
14	Sat, Sept 27	7:30 p.m. MDT	vs. BC Lions	W 14–7	11–2	TSN/RDS2	McMahon Stadium	30,214	Recap
15	Fri, Oct 3	8:00 p.m. MDT	at Saskatchewan Roughriders	W 31–24	12–2	TSN/ESPN2	Mosaic Stadium	33,031	Recap
16	Bye								
17	Sat, Oct 18	5:00 p.m. MDT	at Winnipeg Blue Bombers	W 33–23	13–2	TSN/RDS2	Investors Group Field	22,320	Recap
18	Fri, Oct 24	7:30 p.m. MDT	vs. Saskatchewan Roughriders	W 40–27	14–2	TSN	McMahon Stadium	35,400	Recap
19	Sat, Nov 1	2:00 p.m. MDT	vs. Winnipeg Blue Bombers	L 13–18	14–3	TSN/RDS2	McMahon Stadium	27,076	Recap
20	Fri, Nov 7	8:00 p.m. MST	at BC Lions	W 33–16	15–3	TSN	BC Place	33,752	Recap

== Postseason ==
With a win in week 15, the Stampeders qualified for the playoffs for the 10th straight season. The team was the first in the CFL to clinch a playoff spot, doing so with four games remaining in the regular season. Following their week 17 win over Winnipeg, the Stampeders clinched first place in the West Division with three games remaining.

=== Schedule ===
Game	Date	Kickoff	Opponent	Results		TV	Venue	Attendance	Summary
Game	Date	Kickoff	Opponent	Score	Record	TV	Venue	Attendance	Summary
West Semi-Final	Bye								
West Final	Sun, Nov 23	2:30 p.m. MST	vs. Edmonton Eskimos	W 43–18	1–0	TSN	McMahon Stadium	31,004	Recap
102nd Grey Cup	Sun, Nov 30	4:00 p.m. MST	vs. Hamilton Tiger-Cats	W 20–16	2–0	TSN/RDS/ESPN2	BC Place	52,056	Recap

== Roster ==
2014 Calgary Stampeders final roster
Quarterbacks: 19 Bo Levi Mitchell; 20 Bryant Moniz; 4 Drew Tate; Running backs: 9 Jon Cornish; 26 Rob Cote; 35 Tim St. Pierre; 14 Matt Walter; Receivers: 87 Simon Charbonneau-Campeau; 89 Sederrik Cunningham; 82 Nik Lewis; 16 Marquay McDaniel; 86 Anthony Parker; 80 Eric Rogers; 85 Joe West	Offensive linemen: 60 Shane Bergman G; 66 Stanley Bryant T; 65 Dan Federkeil T; 69 Brett Jones C; 63 Pierre Lavertu G/C; 50 Spencer Wilson G/T; Defensive linemen: 94 Frank Beltre DE; 95 Freddie Bishop DE; 96 Demonte' Bolden DT; 40 Shawn Lemon DE; 99 Corey Mace DT; 90 Quinn Smith DT; 7 Junior Turner DT/DE	Linebackers: 47 Maalik Bomar; 23 Alvin Bowen; 24 Keenan MacDougall; 42 Deron Mayo; 45 Karl McCartney; 12 Juwan Simpson; Defensive backs: 11 Josh Bell; 8 Fred Bennett; 21 Adam Berger; 27 Jeff Hecht; 38 Buddy Jackson; 25 Keon Raymond; 1 Lin-J Shell; 28 Brandon Smith; 41 Adam Thibault; 29 Jamar Wall	Special teams: 6 Rob Maver P; 30 René Paredes K; Reserve roster: 62 Edwin Harrison T; 17 Maurice Price WR; Practice roster: 83 Chris Bauman SB; 53 Brad Erdos G; 88 Kamar Jorden SB; 34 Martell Mallett RB; 0 Bo Palmer RB; 57 Billy Peach G; 46 Charlie Power FB; 32 Brandon Underwood DB; 51 Akeem Whonder LB; 37 Jeremy Williams DB	Injured list: 81 Jabari Arthur SB; 43 Max Caron LB; 48 Yannick Carter LB; 33 Hugh Charles RB; 56 Randy Chevrier LS; 58 Brander Craighead G; 44 Ben D'Aguilar DE; 91 DeQuin Evans DT; 31 Jeff Fuller WR; 39 Charleston Hughes DE; 93 Micah Johnson DT; 92 Brandon Jordan DT; 36 Glenn Love LB; 2 Jock Sanders RB; 3 Brad Sinopoli SB; Suspended list: 0 Quincy Butler DB; Italics indicate American player

== Coaching staff ==
2014 Calgary Stampeders staff
Front office: President and coo – Lyle Bauer; General manager – John Hufnagel; Assistant general manager of player personnel – John Murphy; Assistant general manager of football operations – Michael Petrie; Director of football administration – Jane Mawby; Head coaches: Head coach – John Hufnagel; Assistant head coach – Dave Dickenson; Offensive coaches: Offensive coordinator – Dave Dickenson; Running backs – Brent Monson; Receivers – Pete Costanza; Offensive line – Pat DelMonaco	Defensive coaches: Defensive coordinator – Rich Stubler; Defensive line – DeVone Claybrooks; Defensive backs – Tony Missick; Defensive assistant – Marc Mueller; Special teams coaches: Special teams coordinator – Mark Kilam; Strength and conditioning: Strength and conditioning – Brent Monson; → Coaching staff
