= 2016 BC Lions season =

59th Canadian Football League season for the BC Lions

- General manager: Wally Buono
- Head coach: Wally Buono
- Home stadium: BC Place Stadium

Results
- Record: 12–6
- Division place: 2nd, West
- Playoffs: Lost West Final
- Team MOP: Jonathon Jennings
- Team MOC: Shawn Gore
- Team MOR: Antonio Johnson

Uniform

The 2016 BC Lions season was the 59th season for the team in the Canadian Football League (CFL) and their 63rd overall. The Lions finished in second place in the West Division and finished with a 12–6 record. It was only the third time in franchise history that the Lions had finished in second place, and the first time they have done so since 1986. In each of those three years, the Lions hosted and defeated the Winnipeg Blue Bombers in the West Semi-Final.

This was the team's second stint under now tenth-year head coach, Wally Buono, and his 14th season as the general manager. Buono took over the position following Jeff Tedford's resignation on December 2, 2015. The Lions improved upon their 7–11 record from 2015 and qualified for the playoffs for the 20th straight year, which is the second-longest streak in CFL history. After winning the West Semi-Final against the Blue Bombers, the Lions lost to the Calgary Stampeders in the West Final.

For the seventh consecutive season, the Lions held their training camp at Hillside Stadium in Kamloops, British Columbia with rookie camp beginning Wednesday, May 25 and main camp beginning on Sunday, May 29.

== Offseason ==
=== Free agents ===
Position	Player	2016 Team	Date Signed	Notes
WR	Emmanuel Arceneaux	BC Lions	December 17, 2015	Two-year contract
DB	Steven Clarke	BC Lions	May 24, 2016	Signed with Titans before being released.
LB	Rennie Curran			
OL	Kirby Fabien	BC Lions	December 15, 2015	Two-year contract
DB	Eric Fraser	BC Lions	December 18, 2015	Two-year contract
RB	Andrew Harris	Winnipeg Blue Bombers	February 9, 2016	
LB	Alex Hoffman-Ellis	Hamilton Tiger-Cats	February 9, 2016	
DB	Josh Johnson	Jacksonville Jaguars	February 12, 2016	
RB	Pascal Lochard	Winnipeg Blue Bombers	February 9, 2016	
QB	Travis Lulay	BC Lions	February 8, 2016	Two-year contract
OL	Matt Norman			Retired
OL	Jovan Olafioye	BC Lions	January 14, 2016	Three-year contract
DB	Cord Parks	Edmonton Eskimos	May 26, 2016	
RB	Chris Rainey	BC Lions	February 9, 2016	
DT	Khreem Smith			
WR	Courtney Taylor	BC Lions	August 9, 2016	
OL	Dean Valli			Retired

=== CFL draft ===
The 2016 CFL draft took place on May 10, 2016. The Lions had eight picks in the draft, including two fourth round selections from Hamilton and the loss of their fifth round pick in a trade for Tim O'Neill.

Round	Pick	Player	Position	School/Club team
1	5	Charles Vaillancourt	OL	Laval
2	12	Anthony Thompson	DB	Southern Illinois
3	23	Brett Blaszko	WR	Calgary Dinos
4	30	Dillon Guy	OL	Buffalo
4	32	Shaquille Johnson	WR	Western Ontario
6	48	Brennan Van Nistelrooy	DB	Alberta
7	57	Nathan O'Halloran	FB	Windsor
8	65	Boyd Richardson	DL	British Columbia

== Preseason ==
Week	Date	Kickoff	Opponent	Results		TV	Venue	Attendance	Summary
Week	Date	Kickoff	Opponent	Score	Record	TV	Venue	Attendance	Summary
A	Sat, June 11	6:00 p.m. PDT	at Saskatchewan Roughriders	W 28–16	1–0	TSN	Mosaic Stadium	16,141	Recap
B	Fri, June 17	7:00 p.m. PDT	vs. Calgary Stampeders	L 21–31	1–1	None	BC Place	17,630	Recap

# Games played with colour uniforms.

== Regular season ==
=== Standings ===
West Division
Team	GP	W	L	T	Pts	PF	PA	Div	Stk	
Calgary Stampeders	18	15	2	1	31	586	369	9–1	L1	Details
BC Lions	18	12	6	0	24	545	454	5–5	W3	Details
Winnipeg Blue Bombers	18	11	7	0	22	497	454	5–5	W1	Details
Edmonton Eskimos	18	10	8	0	20	549	496	5–5	W2	Details
Saskatchewan Roughriders	18	5	13	0	10	350	530	1–9	L3	Details

=== Schedule ===
Week	Date	Kickoff	Opponent	Results		TV	Venue	Attendance	Summary
Week	Date	Kickoff	Opponent	Score	Record	TV	Venue	Attendance	Summary
1	Sat, June 25	7:00 p.m. PDT	vs. Calgary Stampeders	W 20–18	1–0	TSN/RDS/ESPN2	BC Place	21,386	Recap
2	Fri, July 1	4:00 p.m. PDT	at Hamilton Tiger-Cats	W 28–3	2–0	TSN/RDS	Tim Hortons Field	24,123	Recap
3	Thurs, July 7	7:00 p.m. PDT	vs. Toronto Argonauts	L 14–25	2–1	TSN/RDS2/ESPN2	BC Place	18,921	Recap
4	Sat, July 16	4:00 p.m. PDT	at Saskatchewan Roughriders	W 40–27	3–1	TSN/RDS	Mosaic Stadium	31,014	Recap
5	Bye								
6	Fri, July 29	7:00 p.m. PDT	at Calgary Stampeders	L 41–44 (OT)	3–2	TSN/RDS2/ESPN2	McMahon Stadium	27,651	Recap
7	Thurs, Aug 4	4:00 p.m. PDT	at Montreal Alouettes	W 38–18	4–2	TSN/RDS/ESPN2	Molson Stadium	19,125	Recap
8	Sat, Aug 13	7:00 p.m. PDT	vs. Hamilton Tiger-Cats	W 45–38	5–2	TSN	BC Place	21,213	Recap
9	Fri, Aug 19	7:00 p.m. PDT	vs. Calgary Stampeders	L 9–37	5–3	TSN	BC Place	21,341	Recap
10	Thurs, Aug 25	4:30 p.m. PDT	at Ottawa Redblacks	W 29–23	6–3	TSN/RDS/ESPN2	TD Place Stadium	24,677	Recap
11	Wed, Aug 31	4:30 p.m. PDT	at Toronto Argonauts	W 16–13	7–3	TSN	BMO Field	17,509	Recap
12	Fri, Sept 9	7:00 p.m. PDT	vs. Montreal Alouettes	W 38–27	8–3	TSN/RDS	BC Place	18,107	Recap
13	Bye								
14	Fri, Sept 23	7:00 p.m. PDT	at Edmonton Eskimos	L 23–27	8–4	TSN/RDS2	Commonwealth Stadium	26,934	Recap
15	Sat, Oct 1	7:00 p.m. PDT	vs. Ottawa Redblacks	W 40–33	9–4	TSN/RDS	BC Place	19,703	Recap
16	Sat, Oct 8	1:00 p.m. PDT	at Winnipeg Blue Bombers	L 35–37	9–5	TSN	Investors Group Field	24,284	Recap
17	Fri, Oct 14	7:00 p.m. PDT	vs. Winnipeg Blue Bombers	L 32–35	9–6	TSN	BC Place	19,520	Recap
18	Sat, Oct 22	4:00 p.m. PDT	vs. Edmonton Eskimos	W 32–25	10–6	TSN	BC Place	22,831	Recap
19	Sat, Oct 29	4:00 p.m. PDT	at Saskatchewan Roughriders	W 24–6	11–6	TSN	Mosaic Stadium	33,427	Recap
20	Sat, Nov 5	4:00 p.m. PDT	vs. Saskatchewan Roughriders	W 41–18	12–6	TSN	BC Place	26,481	Recap

# Games played with colour uniforms.
# Games played with white uniforms.

== Post-season ==
=== Schedule ===
Game	Date	Kickoff	Opponent	Results		TV	Venue	Attendance	Summary
Game	Date	Kickoff	Opponent	Score	Record	TV	Venue	Attendance	Summary
West Semi-Final	Sun, Nov 13	1:30 p.m. PST	vs. Winnipeg Blue Bombers	W 32–31	1–0	TSN/RDS/ESPN3	BC Place	19,176	Recap
West Final	Sun, Nov 20	1:30 p.m. PST	at Calgary Stampeders	L 15–42	1–1	TSN/RDS/ESPN2	McMahon Stadium	32,115	Recap

# Games played with colour uniforms.
# Games played with white uniforms.

== Roster ==
2016 BC Lions final roster
Quarterbacks: 10 Jonathon Jennings; 14 Travis Lulay; 12 Keith Price; Running backs: 26 Anthony Allen; 24 Jeremiah Johnson; 46 Rolly Lumbala; 2 Chris Rainey; Receivers: 83 Stephen Adekolu; 84 Emmanuel Arceneaux; 16 Bryan Burnham; 85 Shawn Gore; 87 Marco Iannuzzi; 1 Terrell Sinkfield	Offensive linemen: 50 Kirby Fabien G; 62 Cody Husband C; 57 Antonio Johnson T; 63 Jovan Olafioye T; 66 Tim O'Neill G/C; 67 Hunter Steward G; 69 Charles Vaillancourt G; Defensive linemen: 53 Alex Bazzie DE; 90 Mic'hael Brooks DT; 48 Maxx Forde DT/DE; 78 David Ménard DE/DT; 93 Craig Roh DE; 92 Bryant Turner DT; 99 Jabar Westerman DT; Special teams: 40 Mike Benson LS; 3 Richie Leone K/P; 4 Paul McCallum K	Linebackers: 45 Jason Arakgi; 44 Adam Bighill; 41 Adrian Clarke; 56 Solomon Elimimian; 49 Nehemie Kankolongo; 8 Bo Lokombo; 91 Cameron Ontko; Defensive backs: 11 Mike Edem; 39 Chandler Fenner; 7 Eric Fraser; 23 Anthony Gaitor; 20 Keynan Parker; 21 Ryan Phillips; 0 Loucheiz Purifoy; 9 Brandon Stewart; 28 Anthony Thompson	Practice roster: 95 Darius Allen DE; 80 Brett Blaszko WR; 36 Dyshawn Davis LB; 31 Josh Harris RB; 96 Andrew Hudson DE; 88 Shaq Johnson WR; 89 Douglas McNeil WR; 32 Nathan O'Halloran FB; 68 Kelvin Palmer T; 72 George Uko DT; Injured list: 29 Steven Clarke DB; 55 Jas Dhillon G; 6 T. J. Lee DB; 17 Nick Moore WR; 35 Shaq Murray-Lawrence RB; 25 Ronnie Yell DB; Italics indicate American players Roster updated 2026-05-17; Depth Chart • Transactions

== Coaching staff ==
2016 BC Lions staff
Front office and support staff: Owner – David Braley; President and ceo – Dennis Skulsky; General manager and vice president of football operations – Wally Buono; Director of football operations & player personnel – Neil McEvoy; Director of us scouting – Ryan Rigmaiden; Player-Business Developmental Advisor – Geroy Simon; Football Operations Consultant, Scout –Roy Shivers; Area Scout –Mike McCarthy; Video assistant – Andrew Millin; Head Trainer – Bill Reichelt; Assistant athletic therapist – Tristan Sandhu; Strength and conditioning trainer – Chris Boyko; Equipment manager – Ken "Kato" Kasuya; Equipment assistant – Andrew Dubiellak; Equipment assistant – Stu Mitchell; Director of communications – Jamie Cartmell	Head coaches: Head coach – Wally Buono; Offensive coaches: Offensive coordinator and quarterbacks – Khari Jones; Running backs – Adam Blasetti; Receivers – Marcel Bellefeuille; Offensive line – Dan Dorazio; Defensive coaches: Defensive coordinator and defensive backs – Mark Washington; Defensive line – Robin Ross; Linebackers – Chris Tormey; Special teams coaches: Special teams coordinator – Marcello Simmons; Strength and conditioning: Strength and conditioning trainer – Chris Boyko; → Coaching staff
