= 2012 Calgary Stampeders season =

Canadian football team season

- Owner: Calgary Sports and Entertainment
- General manager: John Hufnagel
- President: Lyle Bauer
- Head coach: John Hufnagel
- Home stadium: McMahon Stadium

Results
- Record: 12–6
- Division place: 2nd, West
- Playoffs: Lost Grey Cup
- Team MOP: Jon Cornish
- Team MOC: Jon Cornish
- Team MOR: Chris Randle

Uniform

The 2012 Calgary Stampeders season was the 55th season for the team in the Canadian Football League (CFL) and their 74th overall. The Stampeders finished in second place in the West Division with a 12–6 record. The Stampeders won the West Semi-Final over the Saskatchewan Roughriders by a score of 36–30, earning their first playoff victory over Saskatchewan since 1994. The Stampeders then traveled to Vancouver and upset the 1st place BC Lions 34–29, advancing to the Grey Cup game. Calgary were the Grey Cup favourites by two points, but they lost 35–22 to the hometown Toronto Argonauts.

== Offseason ==
=== CFL draft ===
The 2012 CFL draft took place on May 3, 2012. The Stampeders had eight selections in the six-round draft, after trading away their second round pick and acquiring additional picks in the third, fourth, and sixth rounds.

| Round | Pick | Player | Position | School/Club team |
|---|---|---|---|---|
| 1 | 5 | Ameet Pall | DL | Wofford |
| 3 | 15 | Keenan MacDougall | DB | Saskatchewan |
| 3 | 19 | Billy Peach | OL | Jacksonville |
| 4 | 27 | Bradley Erdos | OL | Simon Fraser |
| 4 | 30 | Adam Berger | DB | Simon Fraser |
| 5 | 31 | Mike Filer | OL | Mount Allison |
| 6 | 43 | Jordan Spence | DL | Eastern Oregon |
| 6 | 45 | Wilkerson Desouza | LB | Toronto Varsity Blues |

== Preseason ==
| Week | Date | Opponent | Score | Result | Attendance | Record |
|---|---|---|---|---|---|---|
| A | Fri, June 15 | vs. Edmonton Eskimos | 20–17 | Win | 23,629 | 1–0 |
| B | Fri, June 22 | at Saskatchewan Roughriders | 33–31 | Win | 30,998 | 2–0 |

== Regular season ==
=== Season standings ===
West Division
| Team | GP | W | L | T | PF | PA | Pts | |
|---|---|---|---|---|---|---|---|---|
| BC Lions | 18 | 13 | 5 | 0 | 481 | 354 | 26 | Details |
| Calgary Stampeders | 18 | 12 | 6 | 0 | 534 | 431 | 24 | Details |
| Saskatchewan Roughriders | 18 | 8 | 10 | 0 | 457 | 409 | 16 | Details |
| Edmonton Eskimos | 18 | 7 | 11 | 0 | 422 | 450 | 14 | Details |

=== Season schedule ===
| Week | Date | Opponent | Score | Result | Attendance | Record |
|---|---|---|---|---|---|---|
| 1 | Sun, July 1 | vs. Montreal Alouettes | 38–10 | Win | 26,387 | 1–0 |
| 2 | Sat, July 7 | at Toronto Argonauts | 39–36 | Loss | 20,682 | 1–1 |
| 3 | Thurs, July 12 | at Montreal Alouettes | 33–32 | Loss | 21,074 | 1–2 |
| 4 | Thurs, July 19 | vs. Saskatchewan Roughriders | 41–38 (OT) | Win | 32,228 | 2–2 |
| 5 | Sat, July 28 | vs. BC Lions | 34–8 | Loss | 27,968 | 2–3 |
| 6 | Bye | | | | | 2–3 |
| 7 | Thurs, Aug 9 | at Hamilton Tiger-Cats | 31–20 | Win | 22,635 | 3–3 |
| 8 | Sat, Aug 18 | vs. Toronto Argonauts | 22–14 | Loss | 28,246 | 3–4 |
| 9 | Sat, Aug 25 | at Saskatchewan Roughriders | 17–10 | Win | 33,427 | 4–4 |
| 10 | Mon, Sept 3 | vs. Edmonton Eskimos | 31–30 | Win | 32,102 | 5–4 |
| 11 | Fri, Sept 7 | at Edmonton Eskimos | 20–18 | Win | 39,363 | 6–4 |
| 12 | Fri, Sept 14 | vs. Winnipeg Blue Bombers | 44–3 | Win | 28,247 | 7–4 |
| 13 | Sun, Sept 23 | at Saskatchewan Roughriders | 30–25 | Loss | 33,427 | 7–5 |
| 14 | Fri, Sept 28 | vs. Edmonton Eskimos | 39–15 | Win | 29,290 | 8–5 |
| 15 | Sat, Oct 6 | at BC Lions | 27–22 | Loss | 31,347 | 8–6 |
| 16 | Sat, Oct 13 | at Winnipeg Blue Bombers | 32–21 | Win | 25,462 | 9–6 |
| 17 | Sat, Oct 20 | vs. Hamilton Tiger-Cats | 34–32 | Win | 26,502 | 10–6 |
| 18 | Fri, Oct 26 | vs. BC Lions | 41–21 | Win | 27,014 | 11–6 |
| 19 | Fri, Nov 2 | at Edmonton Eskimos | 30–27 | Win | 21,147 | 12–6 |

== Roster ==
2012 Calgary Stampeders final roster
| Quarterbacks: 15 Kevin Glenn; 19 Bo Levi Mitchell; 3 Brad Sinopoli; Running backs: 9 Jon Cornish; 26 Rob Cote; 14 Matt Walter; Receivers: 81 Jabari Arthur; 89 Chris Bauman; 83 Romby Bryant; 87 Arjei Franklin; 82 Nik Lewis; 16 Marquay McDaniel; 17 Maurice Price; 2 Larry Taylor | Offensive linemen: 66 Stanley Bryant T; 64 J'Michael Deane G; 63 Jon Gott C; 62 Edwin Harrison T; 60 Obby Khan C/G; 67 Dimitri Tsoumpas G; 50 Spencer Wilson T; Defensive linemen: 96 Demonte' Bolden DT; 94 Brian Bulcke DT; 39 Charleston Hughes DE; 76 Cordarro Law DE; 99 Corey Mace DT; 97 Anwar Stewart DE; 23 Junior Turner DE | Linebackers: 47 Akwasi Antwi; 11 Malik Jackson; 42 Deron Mayo; 45 Karl McCartney; Defensive backs: 8 Fred Bennett; 32 Derrius Brooks; 0 Quincy Butler; 7 Eric Fraser; 27 Jeff Hecht; 34 Tad Kornegay; 24 Keenan MacDougall; 33 Chris Randle; 25 Keon Raymond; 28 Brandon Smith | Special teams: 56 Randy Chevrier LS; 6 Rob Maver P; 30 René Paredes K; Reserve roster: 12 Juwan Simpson LB; Practice roster: 41 Wilkerson DeSouza FB; 40 Lyndon Rowells RB; 61 Jonathan St-Pierre G; 20 Marvin White DB; 46 Teryl White DT | Injured list: 88 Jason Armstead WR (1 Game); 95 Stevie Baggs DE (9 Game); 37 Marc Calixte LB (9 Game); 1 LaMarcus Coker RB (9 Game); 53 Mark Dewit C/G (1 Game); 91 Kevin Dixon DE (9 Game); 80 Johnny Forzani WR (9 Game); 68 Na'Shan Goddard T (9 Game); 90 Chris McCoy DE (9 Game); 31 Demetrice Morley DB (9 Game); 59 Steve Myddelton G (9 Game); 86 Anthony Parker WR (1 Game); 36 Kenny Pettway DE (1 Game); 44 Justin Phillips DE (9 Game); 93 Dorian Smith DT (9 Game); 35 Tim St. Pierre LS/FB (9 Game); 4 Drew Tate QB (1 Game); 98 Luis Vasquez DT (1 Game); 29 Jamar Wall DB (1 Game); 85 Joe West WR (1 Game); Italics indicate American player |

== Playoffs ==
=== Schedule ===
| Week | Game | Date | Time | Opponent | Score | Result | Attendance |
|---|---|---|---|---|---|---|---|
| 20 | West Semi-Final | Nov 11 | 2:30 PM MST | Saskatchewan Roughriders | 36–30 | Win | 30,027 |
| 21 | West Final | Nov 18 | 2:30 PM MST | at BC Lions | 34–29 | Win | 43,216 |
| 21 | Grey Cup | Nov 25 | 4:00 PM MST | Toronto Argonauts | 35–22 | Loss | 53,208 |

=== West Semi-Final ===
Saskatchewan at Calgary

| Team | 1 | 2 | 3 | 4 | Total |
|---|---|---|---|---|---|
| Roughriders | 3 | 13 | 0 | 14 | 30 |
| • Stampeders | 0 | 19 | 7 | 10 | 36 |

- Date: November 11
- Location: McMahon Stadium
  Calgary, AB
- Game start: 2:30 PM MST
- Game attendance: 30,027
- Game weather: Partly Cloudy; −3 °C; wind 12 km/h SW
- Referee: Al Bradbury
- TV announcers (TSN): Rod Black (Play by Play), Duane Forde (Colour), Lee Jones (Sideline)

=== West Final ===
Calgary at BC

| Team | 1 | 2 | 3 | 4 | Total |
|---|---|---|---|---|---|
| • Stampeders | 14 | 3 | 14 | 3 | 34 |
| Lions | 7 | 9 | 0 | 13 | 29 |

- Date: November 18
- Location: BC Place Stadium
  Vancouver, BC
- Game start: 2:30 PM MST
- Game attendance: 43,216
- Game weather: None (Retractable roof closed)
- TV announcers (TSN): Chris Cuthbert (Play by Play), Glen Suitor (Colour), Farhan Lalji (Sideline), Ryan Rishaug (Sideline)

=== Grey Cup ===
Calgary vs. Toronto

| Team | 1 | 2 | 3 | 4 | Total |
|---|---|---|---|---|---|
| Stampeders | 3 | 3 | 5 | 11 | 22 |
| • Argonauts | 7 | 17 | 3 | 8 | 35 |

- Date: November 25
- Location: Rogers Centre
  Toronto, ON
- Game start: 4:00 PM MST
- Game attendance: 53,208
- Game weather: None (Retractable roof closed)
- TV announcers (TSN): Chris Cuthbert (Play by Play), Glen Suitor (Colour), Farhan Lalji (Sideline), Sara Orlesky (Sideline)
