= 2012 BC Lions season =

Canadian football team season

- General manager: Wally Buono
- Head coach: Mike Benevides
- Home stadium: BC Place Stadium

Results
- Record: 13–5
- Division place: 1st, West
- Playoffs: Lost West Final
- Team MOP: Travis Lulay
- Team MOC: Andrew Harris
- Team MOR: Jabar Westerman

Uniform

The 2012 BC Lions season was the 55th season for the team in the Canadian Football League (CFL) and their 59th overall. The Lions finished the season in first place in the West Division for the second consecutive year with a 13–5 record. The Lions attempted to repeat as Grey Cup champions for the first time in franchise history, but lost the West Final to the Calgary Stampeders. The Lions also began the season with a new head coach for the first time since 2003, after long-time head coach Wally Buono resigned to focus on his duties as general manager.

== Offseason ==
=== Free agents ===
| Position | Player | 2012 team | Date signed | Notes |
|---|---|---|---|---|
| DT | Aaron Hunt | Montreal Alouettes | Feb. 21, 2012 | |
| OL | Andrew Jones | Toronto Argonauts | Mar. 2, 2012 | |
| RB | Jamall Lee | None | | Retired |
| CB | Dante Marsh | BC Lions | Feb. 15, 2012 | |
| P/K | Paul McCallum | BC Lions | Feb. 2, 2012 | |
| LB | Anton McKenzie | BC Lions | Jan. 30, 2012 | |
| DT | Khalif Mitchell | BC Lions | Jan. 16, 2012 | |
| DB | Ryan Phillips | BC Lions | Feb. 15, 2012 | |

=== CFL draft ===
The 2012 CFL draft took place on May 3, 2012, live at 12:00 PM PDT.The Lions had four selections in the draft, after trading for another first round pick, trading away their second and fourth round picks, and forfeiting their sixth round pick. The Lions further traded up in the draft to select Jabar Westerman with the second overall pick. BC followed that with two offensive linemen (Kirby Fabien and Matt Norman) with their first and third round picks, before selecting linebacker Jordan Verdone in the fifth round.

| Round | Pick | Player | Position | School/club team |
|---|---|---|---|---|
| 1 | 2 | Jabar Westerman | DL | Eastern Michigan |
| 1 | 7 | Kirby Fabien | OL | Calgary |
| 3 | 22 | Matt Norman | OL | Western Ontario |
| 5 | 37 | Jordan Verdone | LB | Calgary |

== Preseason ==
| Week | Date | Opponent | Score | Result | Attendance | Record |
|---|---|---|---|---|---|---|
| A | Wed, June 13 | vs. Saskatchewan Roughriders | 44–10 | Win | 24,871 | 1–0 |
| B | Thurs, June 21 | at Edmonton Eskimos | 24–16 | Win | 30,891 | 2–0 |

# Games played with colour uniforms.

== Regular season ==
=== Standings ===
West Division
| Team | GP | W | L | T | PF | PA | Pts | |
|---|---|---|---|---|---|---|---|---|
| BC Lions | 18 | 13 | 5 | 0 | 481 | 354 | 26 | Details |
| Calgary Stampeders | 18 | 12 | 6 | 0 | 534 | 431 | 24 | Details |
| Saskatchewan Roughriders | 18 | 8 | 10 | 0 | 457 | 409 | 16 | Details |
| Edmonton Eskimos | 18 | 7 | 11 | 0 | 422 | 450 | 14 | Details |

=== Season schedule ===
| Week | Date | Opponent | Score | Result | Attendance | Record |
|---|---|---|---|---|---|---|
| 1 | Fri, June 29 | vs. Winnipeg Blue Bombers | 33–16 | Win | 29,351 | 1–0 |
| 2 | Fri, July 6 | vs. Hamilton Tiger-Cats | 39–36 | Win | 25,109 | 2–0 |
| 3 | Sat, July 14 | at Saskatchewan Roughriders | 23–20 | Loss | 32,080 | 2–1 |
| 4 | Fri, July 20 | vs. Edmonton Eskimos | 27–14 | Loss | 28,335 | 2–2 |
| 5 | Sat, July 28 | at Calgary Stampeders | 34–8 | Win | 27,968 | 3–2 |
| 6 | Mon, Aug 6 | at Toronto Argonauts | 18–9 | Win | 22,841 | 4–2 |
| 7 | Bye | | | | | 4–2 |
| 8 | Sun, Aug 19 | vs. Saskatchewan Roughriders | 24–5 | Win | 34,343 | 5–2 |
| 9 | Fri, Aug 24 | at Winnipeg Blue Bombers | 20–17 | Win | 29,533 | 6–2 |
| 10 | Fri, Aug 31 | at Montreal Alouettes | 30–25 | Loss | 22,239 | 6–3 |
| 11 | Sat, Sept 8 | vs. Montreal Alouettes | 43–10 | Win | 29,734 | 7–3 |
| 12 | Sat, Sept 15 | vs. Toronto Argonauts | 28–23 | Win | 28,526 | 8–3 |
| 13 | Sat, Sept 22 | at Edmonton Eskimos | 19–18 | Win | 35,578 | 9–3 |
| 14 | Sat, Sept 29 | at Saskatchewan Roughriders | 27–21 | Loss | 32,360 | 9–4 |
| 15 | Sat, Oct 6 | vs. Calgary Stampeders | 27–22 | Win | 31,347 | 10–4 |
| 16 | Fri, Oct 12 | at Hamilton Tiger-Cats | 37–17 | Win | 26,842 | 11–4 |
| 17 | Fri, Oct 19 | vs. Edmonton Eskimos | 39–19 | Win | 30,102 | 12–4 |
| 18 | Fri, Oct 26 | at Calgary Stampeders | 41–21 | Loss | 27,014 | 12–5 |
| 19 | Sat, Nov 3 | vs. Saskatchewan Roughriders | 17–6 | Win | 36,357 | 13–5 |

# Games played with colour uniforms.
# Games played with white uniforms.

== Roster ==
2012 BC Lions final roster
| Quarterbacks: 16 Thomas DeMarco; 14 Travis Lulay; 13 Mike Reilly; Running backs: 35 Tim Brown; 25 Stu Foord; 33 Andrew Harris; 46 Rolly Lumbala; Receivers: 1 Arland Bruce; 87 Akeem Foster; 85 Shawn Gore; 87 Marco Iannuzzi; 19 Paris Jackson; 17 Nick Moore; 81 Geroy Simon; 86 Courtney Taylor | Offensive linemen: 65 Ben Archibald T; 66 Adam Baboulas C/G; 68 Patrick Kabongo G/T; 53 Jesse Newman G; 59 Matt Norman G; 63 Jovan Olafioye T; 64 Angus Reid C; 54 Dean Valli G/C; Defensive linemen: 96 Khalif Mitchell DT; 94 Khreem Smith DE; 79 Eric Taylor DT; 99 Jabar Westerman DT/DE; 9 Keron Williams DE; Special teams: 40 Tim Cronk LS; 4 Paul McCallum K/P | Linebackers: 44 Adam Bighill; 48 Justin Conn; 56 Solomon Elimimian; 51 Joash Gesse; 42 Anton McKenzie; 47 James Yurichuk; Defensive backs: 24 Korey Banks; 27 J. R. LaRose; 31 Dante Marsh; 3 Cauchy Muamba; 28 Byron Parker; 21 Ryan Phillips; 26 Anthony Reddick; 2 Lin-J Shell | Reserve roster: 37 Josh Bell DB; 91 Brandon Jordan DT; Practice roster: 6 Jarrett Brown QB; 83 Keith Godding WR; 8 Gerard Lawson DB; 58 Glenn Love LB; 61 Benjamin Ossai G/T; 95 Ekom Udofia DT; Injured list: 45 Jason Arakgi LB (1 game); 92 Maurice Evans DT (1 game); 67 Jon Hameister-Ries G (1 game); 82 Ernest Jackson WR (1 game); 18 Hugh O'Neill K/P (9 games); Italics indicate American players. Roster updated 2026-04-28; Depth Chart • Transactions |

=== Coaching staff ===
2012 BC Lions staff
| Front office: Owner – David Braley; President & CEO – Dennis Skulsky; General manager – Wally Buono; Director of player personnel – Roy Shivers; Player personnel coordinator and assistant to gm – Neil McEvoy; Northwest regional scout – Jeff Smith; Canadian college draft coordinator – Kelly Bates; Head coaches: Head coach – Mike Benevides; Offensive coaches: Offensive coordinator and quarterbacks – Jacques Chapdelaine; Receivers – Travis Moore; Running backs – Kelly Bates; Offensive line – Dan Dorazio | Defensive coaches: Defensive coordinator – Rich Stubler; Defensive line – Carl Hairston; Defensive backs – Mark Washington; Special teams coaches: Special teams coordinator – Chuck McMann; Strength and conditioning: Strength and conditioning trainer – Chris Boyko; → Coaching staff |

== Playoffs ==
=== Schedule ===
| Week | Game | Date | Time | Opponent | Score | Result | Attendance |
|---|---|---|---|---|---|---|---|
| 20 | Bye | | | | | | |
| 21 | West Final | Nov 18 | 1:30 PM PST | Calgary Stampeders | 34–29 | Loss | 43,216 |

# Games played with colour uniforms.

=== West Final ===
Calgary at BC

| Team | 1 | 2 | 3 | 4 | Total |
|---|---|---|---|---|---|
| • Stampeders | 14 | 3 | 14 | 3 | 34 |
| Lions | 7 | 9 | 0 | 13 | 29 |

- Date: November 18
- Location: BC Place Stadium
  Vancouver, BC
- Game start: 1:30 PM PST
- Game attendance: 43,216
- Game weather: None (retractable roof closed)
- TV announcers (TSN): Chris Cuthbert (play by play), Glen Suitor (color), Farhan Lalji (sideline), Ryan Rishaug (sideline)
