= 2011 Saskatchewan Huskies football team =

College football season

2011 Saskatchewan Huskies football
- Conference: Canada West Universities Athletic Association
- Record: 6-4 (5-4 Canada West)
- Head coach: Brian Towriss
- Offensive coordinator: Mike Harrington; Travis Serke; Bart Arnold; Brent Schneider; Jason Sulz
- Defensive coordinator: Ed Carleton; Darrell Burko; Wade Dupont; Aaron Moser; Doug Humbert
- Home stadium: Griffiths Stadium

Uniform

2011 Canada West standings
Team (Rank)	W		L	PTS	Playoff Spot
#2 Calgary	8	-	0	16	†
#6 UBC*	0	-	8	0	X
#10 Saskatchewan	5	-	3	10	X
Regina	5	-	3	10	X
Manitoba	4	-	4	8	
Alberta	2	-	6	4	
*UBC forfeited all six wins due to use of an ineligible player † – Conference Champion; Rankings: CIS Top 10

The 2011 Saskatchewan Huskies football team represented the University of Saskatchewan in the 2011 CIS university football season. They played their home games at Griffiths Stadium in Saskatoon, Saskatchewan. The team went into the season hoping to rebound from a disappointing fourth quarter collapse resulting in a loss to the Alberta Golden Bears in the 2010 Canada West Semi-Final.

== Rankings ==
	Pre	Wk 1	Wk 2	Wk 3	Wk 4	Wk 5	Wk 6	Wk 7	Wk 8	Wk 9	Final
CIS Football Top 10	5	5	4	7	9	7	7	10	10	10	10

RV – Received Votes

== Preseason ==
Date	Time	Opponent	Site	Result	Attendance
08/26/2011	7:00 pm	Windsor Lancers*	Griffiths Stadium; Saskatoon, SK (National Non-Conference Game)	W 34-23	
*Non-conference game; All times are in Central time

== Schedule ==
The schedule is as follows:

Date	Time	Opponent	Rank	Site	TV	Result	Attendance
09/02/2011	7:00 pm	Alberta Golden Bears	No. 5	Griffiths Stadium; Saskatoon, SK (2011 Home Opener/Support Our Troops Game)		W 38-7	5,128
09/09/2011	7:00 pm	Regina Rams	No. 5	Griffiths Stadium; Saskatoon, SK (Centennial Game/Hall of Fame Game)	Shaw TV	W 33-10	7,370
09/17/2011	12:00 pm	Manitoba Bisons	No. 4	University Stadium; Winnipeg, MB (Manitoba's Homecoming Game)	Shaw TV	L 26-16	3,500
09/23/2011	7:00 pm	No. 3 Calgary Dinos	No. 7	McMahon Stadium; Calgary, AB	Canadawest.tv	L 38-24	1,725
09/30/2011	7:00 pm	No. 8 UBC Thunderbirds^{†}	No. 9	Griffiths Stadium; Saskatoon, SK (Homecoming Game)		W 36-33	6,461
10/14/2011	7:00 pm	No. 2 Calgary Dinos	No. 7	Griffiths Stadium; Saskatoon, SK (Blackout Game)		L 20-8	5,446
10/22/2011	7:00 pm	Regina Rams	No. 10	Mosaic Stadium at Taylor Field; Regina, SK	Shaw TV	W 16-15	1,915
10/29/2011	1:00 pm	Alberta Golden Bears	No. 10	Foote Field; Edmonton, AB	Canadawest.tv	W 67-3	1,614
^{†}Homecoming; Rankings from CIS Football Top 10 Poll released prior to the game; All times are in Central time

== Playoffs ==
Date	Time	Opponent	Rank	Site	TV	Result	Attendance
11/05/2010	3:00 pm	No. 6 UBC Thunderbirds	No. 10	Thunderbird Stadium; Vancouver, BC (Canada West Semi-Final)	Shaw TV	L 27-22	3,006
Rankings from CIS Football Top 10 Poll released prior to the game; All times are in Central time

== Radio ==
All Huskies football games will be carried on CK750. The radio announcers are Darryl Skender and Kelly Bowers.

== Roster ==
Saskatchewan Huskies roster
Quarterbacks: -- Drew Burko First Year; 1 Jahlani Gilbert-Knorren Second Year; 12 Trent Peterson Second Year; 6 Parker Siemens Second Year; Running backs: -- Jeremy Andrew First Year; 20 Alex Balogun Fourth Year FB; 30 Shane Buchanan First Year; 3 Ben Coakwell Fourth Year; 36 Joey Deason First Year; 7 Dexter Janke First Year; 28 Mark Klause Third Year; 38 Connor Lutz Third Year; 36 Kent Rempel First Year; -- Devin Sapara First Year; Wide receivers: -- Ryan Boyko First Year; 21 Garrett Burgess Second Year; -- Thomas Chan First Year; 71 Shayne Dueck Fourth Year; 70 Christian Gottenbos First Year; 8/18 Kit Hillis First Year; 77 Josh Huschi First Year; 24 James Jackins First Year; 2 Rory Kohlert Fifth Year; 10 Sean Stenger First Year; 9 Mitch Stevens Third Year; -- Emmett Timms First Year; Slotbacks: 25 Garrett Bolen Third Year; 19 Braeden George Fourth Year; 75 Jerit Lambert First Year; 8 Davis Mitchell First Year; 78 Jeffrey Moore Third Year; 8 Matt Walker Second Year	Offensive linemen: 66 Jordan Arkko First Year; -- Josh Butcher First Year; -- Mathew Czerniak Second Year; 64 Michael Fuller Third Year; 67 Evan Greff First Year; 54 Burton Haig Third Year; 48 Ben Heenan Fourth Year; 65 Darcy Hinds Fourth Year; 65 Darren Hinds Fifth Year; 62 Brandon Myre Fourth Year; 55 Brad Nehring Second Year; 47 Cam Redl Third Year; 68 Clinton Reeder First Year; -- Brennan Stephen First Year; 61 Logan Wilk First Year; 46 Craig Woloshyn Third Year; Defensive linemen: -- Tololima Auva'a First Year; -- Alexander Burko First Year; 47 Jon DeWitt Fifth Year DE; 44 Zach Hart Third Year DT; 58 Glen Joorisity First Year; 63 Stephen Kovach Fourth Year; 60 Mark Roesler Fourth Year; 56 David Rybinski Fourth Year DT; 42 Ben Rush Third Year; 77 Joel Seutter Third Year; 51 Levi Steinhauer Third Year DE; 59 Dylan Wright First Year	Linebackers: 4 Dane Bishop Second Year; -- Jason Briggs First Year; 30 Jacques Geyer First Year; 26 Nico Higgs Fifth Year; 45 Thomas Hilderman Second Year; 48 Jordan Hilgers First Year; 39 Rylund Hunter Fourth Year; -- Kody Kipp First Year; 34 Tom Lynch Fifth Year; -- John Malcolm First Year; 37 Tony Michalchuk Fifth Year; -- David Craig Penner First Year; 35 Charlie Power Second Year; 29 Brodie Rothe Third Year; 31 Peter Thiel Fourth Year; Defensive backs: 23 Andrew Abbs Second Year; 15 Cory Edington First Year; 24 Mitch Friesen Fourth Year; 21 Kurtis Gryba First Year; 18/32 Geoff Hughes First Year; 17 Michael King Second Year; 4 Spencer Krieger First Year; 27 Bryce McCall Fourth Year; 10 Keenan MacDougall Fourth Year; 22 Seamus Neary Third Year; -- Derek Oleksyn First Year; 2 Braden Richards First Year; 11 Tyler Robson Third Year; 20 Derrick Sadownick First Year; 5 Luke Thiel Third Year; Special teams: 32 Denton Kolodzinski Second Year P/K; 16 Stephen McDonald Third Year P/K; 4 Cole Samson First Year P/K; Roster updated 2011-08-26

== Game Notes ==
=== Vs. Windsor ===
Windsor at Saskatchewan

Team	1	2	3	4	Total
Lancers	8	8	0	7	23
• Huskies	7	10	10	7	34

- Date: August 26
- Location: Griffiths Stadium
  Saskatoon, SK
- Game start: 7:00 PM CST

=== Vs. Alberta ===
Alberta at Saskatchewan

Team	1	2	3	4	Total
Golden Bears	0	0	7	0	7
• #5 Huskies	3	21	7	7	38

- Date: September 2
- Location: Griffiths Stadium
  Saskatoon, SK
- Game start: 7:00 PM CST
- Elapsed time: 2:50
- Game attendance: 5,128
- Referee: Bob Dumonceaux

=== Vs. Regina ===
Regina at Saskatchewan

Team	1	2	3	4	Total
Rams	10	0	0	0	10
• #5 Huskies	3	17	3	10	33

- Date: September 9
- Location: Griffiths Stadium
  Saskatoon, SK
- Game start: 7:00 PM CST
- Elapsed time: 3:11
- Game attendance: 7,370
- Game weather: 31°C, few clouds, Wind: West, 6 km/h,
- Referee: Mike Thorson
- TV announcers (Shaw TV): Jim Mullin (play-by-play), Daved Benefield (colour), Dave Thomas (sideline)

=== At Manitoba ===
Saskatchewan at Manitoba

Team	1	2	3	4	Total
#4 Huskies	12	0	4	0	16
• Bisons	0	5	7	14	26

- Date: September 17
- Location: University Stadium
  Winnipeg
- Game start: 12:00 PM CST
- Elapsed time: 2:52
- Game attendance: 3,500
- Referee: Dale Jacobson
- TV announcers (Shaw TV): Jim Mullin (play-by-play), Laurence Nixon (colour), Jim Toth (sideline)

=== At Calgary ===
Saskatchewan at Calgary

Team	1	2	3	4	Total
#7 Huskies	0	7	3	14	24
• #3 Dinos	0	12	10	16	38

- Date: September 23
- Location: McMahon Stadium
  Calgary, AB
- Game start: 7:00 PM CST
- Elapsed time: 3:04
- Game attendance: 1,725
- Game weather: 23°C
- Referee: Shawn Kerr
- Television network: Canadawest.tv

=== Vs. British Columbia ===
UBC at Saskatchewan

Team	1	2	3	4	Total
#8 Thunderbirds	4	7	7	15	33
• #9 Huskies	1	1	20	14	36

- Date: September 30
- Location: Griffiths Stadium
  Saskatoon, SK
- Game start: 7:00 PM CST
- Elapsed time: 3:00
- Game attendance: 6,461
- Game weather: 23°C, partly cloudy, Wind: South 13 KM/h
- Referee: Bob Klein

=== Vs. Calgary ===
Calgary at Saskatchewan

Team	1	2	3	4	Total
• #2 Dinos	1	6	3	10	20
#7 Huskies	0	1	0	7	8

- Date: October 14
- Location: Griffiths Stadium
  Saskatoon, SK
- Game start: 7:00 PM CST
- Game attendance: 5,446
- Game weather: 8°C, partly cloudy, Wind: West 11 KM/h
- Referee: Mike Thorson

=== At Regina ===
Saskatchewan at Regina

Team	1	2	3	4	Total
• #10 Huskies	8	0	1	7	16
Rams	0	12	0	3	15

- Date: October 22
- Location: Mosaic Stadium at Taylor Field
  Regina, SK
- Game start: 7:00 PM CST
- Elapsed time: 2:43
- Game attendance: 1,915
- Game weather: 8°C, mostly clear, Wind: West 13 KM/h
- Referee: Rob Isbister
- TV announcers (Shaw TV): Jim Mullin (play by play), Daved Benefield (colour)

=== At Alberta ===
Saskatchewan at Alberta

Team	1	2	3	4	Total
• #10 Huskies	9	35	13	10	67
Golden Bears	0	0	3	0	3

- Date: October 29
- Location: Foote Field
  Edmonton, AB
- Game start: 1:00 PM CST
- Elapsed time: 2:47
- Game attendance: 1,614
- Game weather: 8°C, sunny, Wind: Northwest 15 KM/h
- Referee: Kelly Edgeworth
- Television network: Canadawest.tv

=== At UBC ===
Saskatchewan at UBC

Team	1	2	3	4	Total
#10 Huskies	0	3	3	16	22
• #6 Thunderbirds	0	3	14	10	27

- Date: November 5
- Location: Thunderbird Stadium
  Vancouver, BC
- Game start: 3:00 PM CST
- Elapsed time: 3:15
- Game attendance: 3,006
- Game weather: 10°C, fine Wind: Light Southeast
- TV announcers (Shaw TV): Jim Mullin (play by play), Daved Benefield (colour), Stu Walters (sideline)

== Awards ==
Regular Season
Date	Player	Award
September 6, 2011	Seamus Neary	Canada West Defensive Player of the Week
September 14, 2011	Tony Michalchuk	Canada West Defensive Player of the Week; CIS Defensive Player of the Week

Postseason
Date	Player	Award
November 9, 2011	Ben Heenan	Canada West All-Star Offensive Tackle
November 9, 2011	Zach Hart	Canada West All-Star Interior Defensive Line
November 10, 2011	Jordan Arkko	Canada West Rookie of the Year
November 24, 2011	Ben Heenan	CIS Second Team All-Canadian Offensive Tackle

All-Star Game Selections
Date	Player	Team	Game
December 14, 2011	Ben Heenan	Team West	East–West Shrine Game
December 17, 2011	Jordan Arkko	IFAF World Team	IFAF International Bowl
January 27, 2012	Jahlani Gilbert-Knorren	IFAF World Team	IFAF International Bowl

== 2012 East West Bowl Selections ==
Player	Position
Seamus Neary	Linebacker
Joel Seutter	Defensive end
Luke Thiel	Defensive back
Brian Towriss	Assistant coach (Huskies head coach)
Jason Sulz	Assistant coach

== 2012 CFL draft Choices ==
Rnd.	Pick #	CFL team	Player	Pos.	School	Conf.	Notes
1	1	Saskatchewan Roughriders	Ben Heenan	OL	Saskatchewan	CWUAA	
3	15	Calgary Stampeders	Keenan MacDougall	DB	Saskatchewan	CWUAA	
