= 2012 Montreal Alouettes season =

Canadian football team season

- General manager: Jim Popp
- Head coach: Marc Trestman
- Home stadium: Percival Molson Memorial Stadium

Results
- Record: 11–7
- Division place: 1st, East
- Playoffs: Lost East Final
- Team MOP: Anthony Calvillo
- Team MOC: Shea Emry
- Team MOR: Patrick Lavoie

Uniform

The 2012 Montreal Alouettes season was their 46th season for the team in the Canadian Football League (CFL) and their 58th overall. The Alouettes opened their training camp at Bishop's University in Sherbrooke, Quebec on June 3. The Alouettes finished in first place in the East Division with an 11–7 record. However, the Alouettes lost the East Final to the Toronto Argonauts 27–20.

== Offseason ==
=== CFL draft ===
The 2012 CFL draft took place on May 3, 2012 live at 3:00 PM EDT. The Alouettes had six selections in the six-round draft, after trading their first-round pick to the BC Lions for Sean Whyte and trading Dylan Steenbergen for another sixth-round pick.

| Round | Pick | Player | Position | School/Club team |
|---|---|---|---|---|
| 2 | 11 | Patrick Lavoie | RB | Laval |
| 3 | 18 | Bo Adebayo | DL | Western Kentucky |
| 4 | 26 | Lance Milton | DB | British Columbia |
| 5 | 34 | Bryn Roy | LB | Texas A&M Commerce |
| 6 | 42 | Keynan Parker | DB | Oregon State |
| 6 | 44 | Ryan White | OL | Bishop's |

== Preseason ==
| Week | Date | Opponent | Venue | Score | Result | Attendance | Record |
|---|---|---|---|---|---|---|---|
| A | Thurs, June 14 | Winnipeg Blue Bombers | Molson Stadium | 22–10 | Loss | 20,005 | 0–1 |
| B | Tues, June 19 | at Toronto Argonauts | Rogers Centre | 25–20 | Loss | 36,214 | 0–2 |

# Games played with white uniforms.

== Regular season ==
=== Season standings ===
East Division
| Team | GP | W | L | T | PF | PA | Pts | |
|---|---|---|---|---|---|---|---|---|
| Montreal Alouettes | 18 | 11 | 7 | 0 | 478 | 489 | 22 | Details |
| Toronto Argonauts | 18 | 9 | 9 | 0 | 445 | 491 | 18 | Details |
| Winnipeg Blue Bombers | 18 | 6 | 12 | 0 | 376 | 531 | 12 | Details |
| Hamilton Tiger-Cats | 18 | 6 | 12 | 0 | 538 | 576 | 12 | Details |

=== Season schedule ===
| Week | Date | Opponent | Venue | Score | Result | Attendance | Record |
|---|---|---|---|---|---|---|---|
| 1 | Sun, July 1 | at Calgary Stampeders | McMahon Stadium | 38–10 | Loss | 26,387 | 0–1 |
| 2 | Fri, July 6 | Winnipeg Blue Bombers | Molson Stadium | 41–30 | Win | 21,016 | 1–1 |
| 3 | Thurs, July 12 | Calgary Stampeders | Molson Stadium | 33–32 | Win | 21,074 | 2–1 |
| 4 | Sat, July 21 | at Hamilton Tiger-Cats | Ivor Wynne Stadium | 39–24 | Loss | 23,392 | 2–2 |
| 5 | Fri, July 27 | Toronto Argonauts | Molson Stadium | 23–20 | Loss | 22,773 | 2–3 |
| 6 | Fri, Aug 3 | at Winnipeg Blue Bombers | Canad Inns Stadium | 36–26 | Win | 29,533 | 3–3 |
| 7 | Bye | | | | | | 3–3 |
| 8 | Fri, Aug 17 | at Edmonton Eskimos | Commonwealth Stadium | 38–25 | Win | 32,760 | 4–3 |
| 9 | Thurs, Aug 23 | Hamilton Tiger-Cats | Molson Stadium | 31–29 | Win | 22,140 | 5–3 |
| 10 | Fri, Aug 31 | BC Lions | Molson Stadium | 30–25 | Win | 22,239 | 6–3 |
| 11 | Sat, Sept 8 | at BC Lions | BC Place Stadium | 43–10 | Loss | 29,734 | 6–4 |
| 12 | Sun, Sept 16 | Saskatchewan Roughriders | Molson Stadium | 28–17 | Win | 23,147 | 7–4 |
| 13 | Sun, Sept 23 | Toronto Argonauts | Molson Stadium | 31–10 | Win | 23,209 | 8–4 |
| 14 | Fri, Sept 28 | at Hamilton Tiger-Cats | Ivor Wynne Stadium | 41–28 | Loss | 23,784 | 8–5 |
| 15 | Mon, Oct 8 | Winnipeg Blue Bombers | Molson Stadium | 27–22 | Loss | 23,201 | 8–6 |
| 16 | Sun, Oct 14 | at Toronto Argonauts | Rogers Centre | 24–12 | Win | 25,348 | 9–6 |
| 17 | Sat, Oct 20 | at Saskatchewan Roughriders | Mosaic Stadium | 34–28 | Win | 32,003 | 10–6 |
| 18 | Sun, Oct 28 | Edmonton Eskimos | Molson Stadium | 27–25 | Win | 23,312 | 11–6 |
| 19 | Sat, Nov 3 | at Winnipeg Blue Bombers | Canad Inns Stadium | 19–11 | Loss | 26,907 | 11–7 |

# Games played with colour uniforms.
# Games played with white uniforms.

== Roster ==
2012 Montreal Alouettes final roster
| Quarterbacks: 13 Anthony Calvillo; 3 Adrian McPherson; 8 Josh Neiswander; Running backs: 5 Noel Devine; 30 Dahrran Diedrick; 32 Chris Jennings; Receivers: 0 Bo Bowling; 85 Brian Bratton; 9 Éric Deslauriers; 19 S. J. Green; 84 Trent Guy; 81 Patrick Lavoie; 18 Jamel Richardson | Offensive linemen: 64 Ryan Bomben G; 59 Josh Bourke T; 58 Luc Brodeur-Jourdain C; 57 Scott Flory G; 51 Kristian Matte G/T; 68 Michael Ola T/G; 54 Jeff Perrett T; 60 Andrew Woodruff G; Defensive linemen: 7 John Bowman DE; 91 Alan-Michael Cash DT; 90 Chima Ihekwoaba DE; 97 Aaron Lavarias DE; 45 Michael Lockley DE; 93 Luc Mullinder DE/DT | Linebackers: 10 Marc-Olivier Brouillette; 11 Chip Cox; 38 Curtis Dublanko; 41 Shea Emry; 43 Kenny Ingram; 44 Brian Ridgeway; Defensive backs: 33 Dwight Anderson; 39 Jerald Brown; 26 Michael Carter; 34 Kyries Hebert; 17 Billy Parker; 36 Daryl Townsend; 23 Seth Williams | Special teams: 37 Martin Bédard LS; 6 Sean Whyte K/P; Reserve list: 20 Victor Anderson RB; 21 Wopamo Osaisai DB; 40 Ameet Pall DE; Practice roster: 47 Ivan Brown DE; 25 Eddie Elder DB; 53 Kenny Iwebema DE; 87 Ezra Millington WR; 24 Lance Milton DB; 31 Winston Venable LB; 67 Ryan White T/G | Injured list: 98 Bo Adebayo DE; 55 Anthony Barrette T; 96 J.P. Bekasiak DT; 99 Scooter Berry DE; -- David Clowney WR; 12 Rod Davis LB; 29 Ed Gainey DB; -- Stephen Garcia QB; 95 Moton Hopkins DT; 14 Brandon London WR; 16 Bryn Roy LB; -- Derek Schiavone K/P; 2 Brandon Whitaker RB; 42 Bear Woods LB; Suspended list: 94 Ventrell Jenkins DT; -- Rafael Priest DB; Italics indicate American players |

== Coaching staff ==
2012 Montreal Alouettes staff
| Front office: Owner – Bob Wetenhall; President and ceo – (vacant); VP, General Manager and Director of Football Operations and Player Personnel – Jim Popp; Assistant general manager – Marcel Desjardins; Coordinator of scouting and football administration – Joey Abrams; Football operations assistant/scout – Uzooma Okeke; Head coaches: Head coach – Marc Trestman; Offensive coaches: Offensive Coordinator & QB Coach – Marcus Brady; Running Backs Coach, Administrative Assistant to Head Coach– Andy Bischoff; Receivers – Carson Walch; Offensive line – Pat Meyer | Defensive coaches: Defensive Coordinator & Defensive Backs Coach – Jeff Reinebold; Defensive line coach – Mike Sinclair; Linebackers coach – Matt Sheldon; Defensive assistant – Jean-Marc Edme; Special teams coaches: Special teams coordinator – Andy Bischoff; Special teams assistant – Brendan Nugent; → Coaching staff |

== Playoffs ==
=== Schedule ===
| Game | Date | Time | Opponent | Venue | Score | Result | Attendance |
|---|---|---|---|---|---|---|---|
| East Semi-Final | Bye | | | | | | |
| East Final | Nov 18 | 1:00 PM EST | Toronto Argonauts | Olympic Stadium | 27–20 | Loss | 50,112 |

# Games played with colour uniforms.

=== East Final ===
This game would be the last one played at Olympic Stadium by the Alouettes.

Toronto at Montreal

| Team | 1 | 2 | 3 | 4 | Total |
|---|---|---|---|---|---|
| • Argonauts | 3 | 7 | 14 | 3 | 27 |
| Alouettes | 10 | 7 | 0 | 3 | 20 |

- Date: November 18
- Location: Olympic Stadium
  Montreal, QC
- Game start: 1:00 PM EST
- Game attendance: 50,112
- Game weather: None (Domed stadium)
- Referee: Glen Johnson
- TV announcers (TSN): Rod Black (Play by Play), Duane Forde (Colour), Sara Orlesky (Sideline), John Lu (Sideline)
