= Verdone =

Verdone is a surname. Notable people with the surname include:

- Carlo Verdone (born 1950), Italian actor, screenwriter and film director
- Jordan Verdone (born 1989), Canadian football player
- Luca Verdone (born 1953), Italian film director

== See also ==
- Verdicchio
