= Ismaël Bamba =

Canadian football player (born 1987)

No. 85
- Position: Wide receiver

Personal information
- Born: November 10, 1987 (age 38); Côte d'Ivoire
- Listed height: 6 ft 1 in (1.85 m)
- Listed weight: 195 lb (88 kg)

Career information
- CJFL: St. Leonard Cougars
- College: North Dakota
- University: Sherbrooke
- CFL draft: 2012: 6th round, 39th overall pick

Career history
- 2012: Saskatchewan Roughriders
- 2013: Edmonton Eskimos*
- 2013: Montreal Alouettes
- * Offseason or practice squad member only
- Stats at CFL.ca (archive)

Ismaël Bamba (born November 10, 1987) is an Ivorian former professional Canadian football wide receiver who played for the Montreal Alouettes of the Canadian Football League (CFL) in 2013. He was selected 39th overall by the Saskatchewan Roughriders in the 2012 CFL draft. After the 2011 CIS season, he was ranked as the 11th best player in the Canadian Football League’s Amateur Scouting Bureau final rankings for players eligible in the 2012 CFL draft, and sixth by players in Canadian Interuniversity Sport. He played CIS football with the Sherbrooke Vert et Or. He also played for the St. Leonard Cougars of the CJFL and for the University of North Dakota Fighting Sioux.
