= 2012 Toronto Argonauts season =

CFL team season

- General manager: Jim Barker
- Head coach: Scott Milanovich
- Home stadium: Rogers Centre

Results
- Record: 9–9
- Division place: 2nd, East
- Playoffs: Won Grey Cup
- Team MOP: Chad Owens
- Team MOC: Andre Durie
- Team MOR: Armond Armstead

Uniform

The 2012 Toronto Argonauts season was the 55th season for the team in the Canadian Football League (CFL) and their 140th season overall. The Argonauts finished in second place in the East Division with a respectable 9–9 record, improving on their 6–12 record from 2011. The Argos hosted their first home playoff game since 2007 against the Edmonton Eskimos, the crossover team from the West, which the Argos won 42–26. Their next opponent was the Montreal Alouettes. In a close game, the Argonauts came out on top 27–20 and made it to the Grey Cup game. The Argonauts won the 100th Grey Cup 35–22 over the Calgary Stampeders.

== Offseason ==
=== CFL draft ===
The 2012 CFL draft took place on May 3, 2012 live at 3:00 PM EDT. The Argonauts had six selections in the six-round draft, with no picks in the first and third rounds after completing trades for quarterbacks Ricky Ray and Steven Jyles respectively.

Round	Pick	Player	Position	School/Club team
2	9	Cleyon Laing	DE	Iowa State
4	24	Herve Tonye-Tonye	LB	Northern Colorado
4	28	Quincy Hurst	WR	Manitoba
5	32	Luke Willson	TE	Rice Owls
6	40	Aaron Crawford	LB	Saint Mary's
6	41	Shea Pierre	DB	Windsor

== Preseason ==
Week	Date	Opponent	Location	Final Score	Attendance	Record
A	June 13	@ Tiger-Cats	Ivor Wynne Stadium	W 29 – 24	27,585	1–0
B	June 19	Alouettes	Rogers Centre	W 25 – 20	36,214	2–0

== Regular season ==
With a 31-26 win over the Saskatchewan Roughriders on October 27, the Argonauts clinched a playoff spot for the first time since 2010. It also ensured that the Argonauts would play at home in the playoffs, something Toronto had not accomplished since the club's 2007 season.

=== Season standings ===
East Division
Team	GP	W	L	T	PF	PA	Pts	
Montreal Alouettes	18	11	7	0	478	489	22	Details
Toronto Argonauts	18	9	9	0	445	491	18	Details
Winnipeg Blue Bombers	18	6	12	0	376	531	12	Details
Hamilton Tiger-Cats	18	6	12	0	538	576	12	Details

=== Season schedule ===
Win Loss Tie

Week	Date	Opponent	Location	Final Score	Attendance	Record
1	June 30	@ Eskimos	Commonwealth Stadium	L 19 – 15	35,538	0–1
2	July 7	Stampeders	Rogers Centre	W 39 – 36	20,682	1–1
3	July 14	@ Tiger-Cats	Ivor Wynne Stadium	L 36 – 27	24,264	1–2
4	July 18	Blue Bombers	Rogers Centre	W 25 – 22	22,485	2–2
5	July 27	@ Alouettes	Molson Stadium	W 23 – 20	22,773	3–2
6	August 6	Lions	Rogers Centre	L 18 – 9	22,841	3–3
7	Bye					3–3
8	August 18	@ Stampeders	McMahon Stadium	W 22 – 14	28,246	4–3
9	August 27	Eskimos	Rogers Centre	L 26 – 17	22,912	4–4
10	September 3	@ Tiger-Cats	Ivor Wynne Stadium	W 33 – 30	31,032	5–4
11	September 8	Tiger-Cats	Rogers Centre	W 45 – 31	23,061	6–4
12	September 15	@ Lions	BC Place	L 28 – 23	28,526	6–5
13	September 23	@ Alouettes	Molson Stadium	L 31 – 10	23,209	6–6
14	September 29	@ Blue Bombers	Canad Inns Stadium	W 29 – 10	27,169	7–6
15	October 8	Roughriders	Rogers Centre	L 36 – 10	25,176	7–7
16	October 14	Alouettes	Rogers Centre	L 24 – 12	25,348	7–8
17	October 19	Blue Bombers	Rogers Centre	L 44 – 32	23,419	7–9
18	October 27	@ Roughriders	Mosaic Stadium	W 31 – 26	29,747	8–9
19	November 1	Tiger-Cats	Rogers Centre	W 43 – 40	27,283	9–9

== Roster ==
2012 Toronto Argonauts final roster
Quarterbacks: 7 Trevor Harris; 12 Jarious Jackson; 15 Ricky Ray; Running backs: 33 Jeff Johnson; 44 Chad Kackert; Receivers: 81 Jason Barnes; 88 Mike Bradwell; 32 Andre Durie; 11 Dontrelle Inman; 9 Maurice Mann; 2 Chad Owens; 82 Chad Rempel LS; 89 Spencer Watt	Offensive linemen: 59 Joe Eppele G/T; 64 Andrew Jones G; 67 Jeff Keeping C; 57 Marc Parenteau G; 68 Joel Reinders T; 54 Chris Van Zeyl T; 65 Tony Washington T; Defensive linemen: 96 Armond Armstead DT; 78 Adriano Belli DT; 99 Ronald Flemons DE/DT; 95 Ricky Foley DE; 94 Kevin Huntley DT; 5 E. J. Kuale DE; 91 David Lee DE; 97 Zander Robinson DE	Linebackers: 6 Marcus Ball; 51 Tristan Black; 28 Brandon Isaac; 45 Robert McCune; 46 Jason Pottinger; 42 Walter Spencer; Defensive backs: 39 Matt Black; 27 Étienne Boulay; 8 Ahmad Carroll; 19 Jalil Carter; 4 Pacino Horne; 24 Evan McCollough; 26 Jordan Younger; Special teams: 1 Noel Prefontaine K/P; 30 Swayze Waters K/P	Reserve roster: 47 Kyle Jones LB; 20 Bryan Payton LB; 21 Gerald Riggs Jr. RB; Practice roster: 13 Anthony Alix K/P; 69 Gerald Cadogan T; 38 Johnnie Dixon DB; 83 Julian Feoli-Gudino SB; 87 Quincy Hurst WR; 90 Donte Paige-Moss DE; 84 Samuel Tranks WR; Injured list: 17 Zach Collaros QB (1 Game); 10 Danny Desriveaux WR (1 Game); 61 Cedric Gagné-Marcoux G (9 Game); 18 Djems Kouamé WR (9 Game); 16 Ken-Yon Rambo SB (1 Game); 52 Wayne Smith G/T (1 Game); 25 Pat Watkins CB (1 Game); Italics indicates American player Roster updated 2026-05-12; Depth Chart; Transactions (argonauts.ca); Transactions (cfl.ca)

== Coaching staff ==
2012 Toronto Argonauts staff
Front office: Owner – David Braley; President and ceo – Chris Rudge; Vice-Chair – Michael Clemons; General manager – Jim Barker; Assistant general manager and football operations – Ian Sanderson; Assistant general manager – Chris Jones; Director of player personnel – Mike Hagen; Football operations consultant – Nick Volpe; Head coaches: Head coach – Scott Milanovich; Assistant head coach – Chris Jones; Offensive coaches: Quarterbacks – Jason Maas; Receivers – Kez McCorvey; Offensive line – Stephen McAdoo; Running Backs - Anthony Ierullo	Defensive coaches: Defensive coordinator – Chris Jones; Defensive line – Cory Stone; Secondary – Orlondo Steinauer; Linebackers - James Stanley; Special teams coaches: Special teams coordinator – Mike O'Shea; → Coaching staff

== Postseason ==
=== Schedule ===
Round	Date	Opponent	Location	Final score	Attendance
East Semi-Final	November 11	Eskimos	Rogers Centre	W 42 – 26	25,792
East Final	November 18	@ Alouettes	Olympic Stadium	W 27 – 20	50,112
Grey Cup	November 25	Stampeders	Rogers Centre	W 35 – 22	53,208

=== Bracket ===
November 11: Division Semi-Finals
East
W4	Edmonton Eskimos	26
E2	Toronto Argonauts	42
West
W3	Saskatchewan Roughriders	30
W2	Calgary Stampeders	36

November 18: Division Finals
E2	Toronto Argonauts	27
E1	Montreal Alouettes	20
W2	Calgary Stampeders	34
W1	BC Lions	29

November 25: 100th Grey Cup; Rogers Centre – Toronto
E2	Toronto Argonauts	35
W2	Calgary Stampeders	22

*-Team won in Overtime.

=== East Semi-Final ===
Edmonton at Toronto

Team	1	2	3	4	Total
Eskimos	7	0	3	16	26
• Argonauts	0	31	1	10	42

- Date: November 11
- Location: Rogers Centre
  Toronto, ON
- Game start: 1:00 PM EST
- Game attendance: 25,792
- Game weather: None (Retractable roof closed)
- Referee: Murray Clarke
- TV announcers (TSN): Chris Cuthbert (Play by Play), Glen Suitor (Colour), Sara Orlesky (Sideline)

=== East Final ===
Toronto at Montreal

Team	1	2	3	4	Total
• Argonauts	3	7	14	3	27
Alouettes	10	7	0	3	20

- Date: November 18
- Location: Olympic Stadium
  Montreal, QC
- Game start: 1:00 PM EST
- Game attendance: 50,112
- Game weather: None (Domed stadium)
- Referee: Glen Johnson
- TV announcers (TSN): Rod Black (Play by Play), Duane Forde (Colour), Sara Orlesky (Sideline), John Lu (Sideline)

=== Grey Cup ===
Calgary vs. Toronto

Team	1	2	3	4	Total
Stampeders	3	3	5	11	22
• Argonauts	7	17	3	8	35

- Date: November 25
- Location: Rogers Centre
  Toronto, ON
- Game start: 6:00 PM EST
- Game attendance: 53,208
- Game weather: None (Retractable roof closed)
- Referee: Glen Johnson
- TV announcers (TSN): Chris Cuthbert (Play by Play), Glen Suitor (Colour), Farhan Lalji (Sideline), Sara Orlesky (Sideline)
