= Christo Bilukidi =

Angola-born American football player (born 1989)

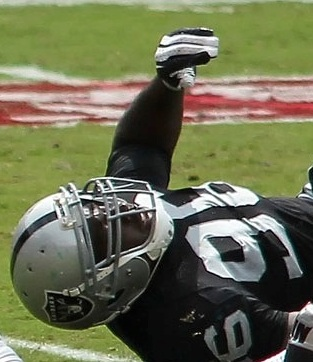
- Bilukidi with the Oakland Raiders in 2012

No. 96, 90, 68
- Position: Defensive end

Personal information
- Born: December 13, 1989 (age 36); Angola
- Listed height: 6 ft 5 in (1.96 m)
- Listed weight: 290 lb (132 kg)

Career information
- High school: St. Patrick's (Ottawa, Ontario, Canada)
- College: Georgia State
- NFL draft: 2012: 6th round, 189th overall pick
- CFL draft: 2012: 3rd round, 21st overall pick

Career history
- Oakland Raiders (2012–2013); Cincinnati Bengals (2013); Baltimore Ravens (2014–2015); Washington Redskins (2016)*; New York Jets (2016)*
- * Offseason or practice squad member only

Career NFL statistics
- Total tackles: 16
- Sacks: 1.0
- Stats at Pro Football Reference

Christo Milumba Bilukidi (born December 13, 1989) is an Angolan-born Canadian former professional football defensive end who played in the National Football League (NFL). He played college football at Eastern Arizona College before transferring to Georgia State University where he was a two-year starter for the Panthers.

== Early life ==
Bilukidi was born in Angola and lived in France and Brazil before his family settled in Ottawa, Ontario, Canada. He attended the high school École secondaire catholique Franco-Cité before attending St. Patrick's High School, where he only played football his senior year, participating on both his high school and with the Cumberland Panthers OVFL Varsity team. He attended and played for Eastern Arizona College in 2009 before playing for Georgia State. He was a member of Georgia State's first football team and, together with Jake Muasau, the first Panthers to play in the NFL.

== Professional career ==
Bilukidi was drafted 21st overall in the 3rd round of the 2012 CFL draft by the Winnipeg Blue Bombers.

=== Oakland Raiders ===
On April 28, 2012, Bilukidi became the first former Georgia State football player to be drafted into the NFL when he was chosen by the Oakland Raiders as the 189th pick overall in the sixth round of the 2012 NFL draft. He was released by the Raiders on October 23, 2013.

=== Cincinnati Bengals ===
He signed with the Bengals on November 1, 2013. This contract was voided as Bilukidi's work visa did not transfer to another team. Once he secured proper documentation, he re-signed with the Bengals on November 21. The Bengals released Bilukidi on September 6, 2014 before their first game of the 2014 season.

=== Baltimore Ravens ===
On September 8, 2014, the Baltimore Ravens signed Bilukidi after voiding the contract of Ray Rice. On February 27, 2015, the Baltimore Ravens extended Bilukidi to a 2-year contract. Bilukidi was waived by the Ravens on October 10, 2015.

=== Washington Redskins ===
The Washington Redskins signed Bilukidi to a futures contract on January 4, 2016. He was released by the team on May 2.
