= Rob Cote =

Canadian gridiron footballer (born 1986)

No. 26
- Position: Fullback

Personal information
- Born: July 5, 1986 (age 40); Calgary, Alberta, Canada
- Listed height: 6 ft 1 in (1.85 m)
- Listed weight: 227 lb (103 kg)

Career information
- High school: Cochrane
- CJFL: Victoria Rebels
- CFL draft: 2007: undrafted

Career history
- 2007–2017: Calgary Stampeders

Awards and highlights
- 2× Grey Cup champion (2008, 2014)
- Stats at CFL.ca

Rob Cote (born July 5, 1986) is a Canadian former professional football fullback who played 10 years for the Calgary Stampeders of the Canadian Football League (CFL). He was originally signed by the Calgary Stampeders as an undrafted free agent in 2007. He also played in the Canadian Junior Football League (CJFL) for the Victoria Rebels.

Cote attends the University of Calgary in the off-season but had never played CIS football.

== Early life ==
Cote grew up in Cochrane, Alberta and played for the Cochrane High School Cobras football team.

== Professional career ==
On February 18, 2017 it was announced that Cote re-signed with the Calgary Stampeders on a one-year deal.

Cote announced his retirement from professional football on January 23, 2018.

== Career statistics ==
		Rushing						Receiving
Year	Team	GP	Car	Yards	Avg	Long	TD	Rec	Yards	Avg	Long	TD
2007	CGY	18	2	3	1.5	3	0	11	112	10.2	21	2
2008	CGY	10	0	0	0.0	0	0	2	23	11.5	19	0
2009	CGY	17	4	20	5.0	10	0	7	99	14.1	28	2
2010	CGY	18	3	11	3.7	6	0	11	111	10.1	20	2
2011	CGY	14	0	0	0.0	0	0	15	171	11.4	41	0
2012	CGY	18	0	0	0.0	0	0	17	184	10.8	26	2
2013	CGY	16	3	5	1.7	3	0	8	75	9.4	22	1
2014	CGY	17	7	31	4.4	11	0	11	96	8.7	29	1
2015	CGY	18	0	0	0.0	0	0	12	138	11.5	26	0
2016	CGY	18	8	28	3.5	11	0	12	99	8.3	14	2
2017	CGY	15	13	45	3.5	12	0	7	52	7.4	13	1
CFL totals		179	40	143	3.6	12	0	113	1,160	10.3	41	13
