= 2012 CFL draft =

Canadian football draft

2012 CFL Draft

General information
- Sport: Canadian football
- Date: May 3
- Time: 3:00 PM ET
- Location: Toronto
- Network: TSN

Overview
- 45 total selections in 6 rounds
- First selection: Ben Heenan
- Most selections: Calgary Stampeders (8)
- Fewest selections: BC Lions (4); Saskatchewan Roughriders (4)
- CIS selections: 24
- NCAA selections: 21

The 2012 CFL draft took place on Thursday, May 3, 2012 at 3:00 PM ET on TSN. 45 players were chosen from among eligible players from Canadian Universities across the country, as well as Canadian players playing in the NCAA. The Calgary Stampeders had the most selections with eight, while Hamilton had seven picks. The Toronto Argonauts and Montreal Alouettes each had six and the Edmonton Eskimos and Winnipeg Blue Bombers had five picks. The defending Grey Cup champion BC Lions and the Saskatchewan Roughriders had the fewest selections with just four. A total of three trades involving 11 draft picks in this draft were made on the draft day itself. Of the 45 draft selections, 24 players were drafted from Canadian Interuniversity Sport institutions, which is the lowest percentage of CIS players taken since 2006 (26 of 50, 52%, were selected then). It is also the lowest number of CIS players taken since the 2000 CFL draft when just 22 out of 46 players were chosen.

The first two rounds were broadcast live on TSN with CFL Commissioner Mark Cohon announcing each selection. The production was hosted by Rod Black and featured the CFL on TSN panel which included Duane Forde, Chris Schultz, Dave Naylor, Farhan Lalji, Blake Nill, Jeff Cummins, and Stefan Ptaszek who analyzed the teams' needs and picks.

== Top prospects ==
60 of the top Canadian athletes attended the 2012 CFL Evaluation Camp which took place March 2–4 in Toronto. Below is a table with the CFL Scouting Bureau rankings of the top CFL Draft prospects.

Final Ranking	January Ranking	September Ranking	Player	Position	School
1	2	-	Tyrone Crawford	Defensive end	Boise State
2	1	1	Ben Heenan	Offensive lineman	Saskatchewan
3	4	2	Shamawd Chambers	Wide receiver	Wilfrid Laurier
4	3	3	Austin Pasztor	Offensive lineman	Virginia
5	6	4	Frédéric Plesius	Linebacker	Laval
6	12	13	Christo Bilukidi	Defensive end	Georgia State
7	7	-	Ameet Pall	Defensive end	Wofford
8	-	-	Jabar Westerman	Defensive lineman	Eastern Michigan
9	9	8	Simon Charbonneau-Campeau	Wide receiver	Sherbrooke
10	15	11	Matt Norman	Offensive lineman	Western Ontario
11	11	6	Ismaël Bamba	Wide receiver	Sherbrooke
12	14	-	Johnny Aprile	Wide receiver	Queen's
13	-	-	Justin Capicciotti	Defensive lineman	Simon Fraser
14	-	-	Keenan MacDougall	Defensive back	Saskatchewan
15	5	5	Kirby Fabien	Offensive lineman	Calgary
-	8	7	Bryce McCall	Defensive back	Saskatchewan
-	10	-	Jason Medeiros	Offensive lineman	McMaster
-	13	-	Arnaud Gascon-Nadon	Defensive end	Laval
-	-	9	Tyson Pencer	Offensive lineman	Washington State
-	-	10	Hasan Hazime	Defensive end	Akron
-	-	12	Austin Anderson	Kicker	McGill
-	-	14	Keynan Parker	Defensive back	Oregon State
-	-	15	Courtney Stephen	Defensive back	Northern Illinois

== Trades ==
In the explanations below, (D) denotes trades that took place during the draft, while (PD) indicates trades completed pre-draft.

=== Round one ===
- Montreal → BC (PD). Montreal traded this selection to BC for Sean Whyte.
- Toronto → Edmonton (PD). Toronto traded this selection, Steven Jyles and Grant Shaw to Edmonton for Ricky Ray.
- Edmonton → BC (D). Edmonton traded this selection and the 20th overall pick in this year's draft to BC for the fourth overall pick, the 14th overall pick, and the 38th overall pick in this year's draft.
- BC → Edmonton (D). BC traded this selection, the 14th overall pick, and the 38th overall pick in this year's draft to Edmonton for the second overall pick and the 20th overall pick in this year's draft.
- Hamilton → Winnipeg (D). Hamilton traded this selection to Winnipeg for the eighth overall pick in the 2012 CFL Draft and the 13th overall pick in the 2012 CFL Draft.

=== Round two ===
- Saskatchewan → Winnipeg (PD). Saskatchewan traded this selection, a fourth round pick in the 2012 CFL Draft, and a conditional draft pick in the 2013 CFL draft to Winnipeg for Odell Willis and a conditional fifth round draft pick in the 2013 CFL draft.
- BC → Edmonton (D). BC traded this selection, the fourth overall pick, and the 38th overall pick in this year's draft to Edmonton for the second overall pick and the 20th overall pick in this year's draft.
- Winnipeg → Hamilton (D). Winnipeg traded this selection and the 13th overall pick in this year's draft to Hamilton for the third overall pick in this year's draft.
- Winnipeg → Hamilton (D). Winnipeg traded this selection and the eighth overall pick in this year's draft to Hamilton for the third overall pick in this year's draft.
- Calgary → Saskatchewan (D). Calgary traded this selection and the 35th overall pick in this year's draft to Saskatchewan for the 15th overall pick in this year's draft and a second round pick in the 2013 CFL draft.

=== Round three ===
- BC → Hamilton (PD). BC traded this selection and a conditional pick in the 2013 CFL draft to Hamilton for Arland Bruce III.
- Toronto → Winnipeg (PD). Toronto traded this selection and a first round pick in the 2011 CFL draft to Winnipeg for Steven Jyles. This selection, originally a fourth round pick, could be upgraded to as high as a second round pick, contingent upon the number of games that Jyles plays for Toronto. Jyles played in eight games and this pick became a third round selection.
- Edmonton → BC (D). Edmonton traded this selection and the second overall pick in this year's draft to BC for the fourth overall pick, the 14th overall pick, and the 38th overall pick in this year's draft.
- Saskatchewan → Calgary (D). Saskatchewan traded this selection and a second round pick in the 2013 CFL draft to Calgary for the 12th overall pick in this year's draft and the 35th overall pick in this year's draft.

=== Round four ===
- BC → Calgary (PD). BC traded this selection and a second round pick in the 2011 CFL draft to Calgary for Jesse Newman.
- Edmonton → Toronto (PD). Edmonton traded this selection to Toronto for Delroy Clarke.
- Saskatchewan → Winnipeg (PD). Saskatchewan traded this selection, a second round pick in the 2012 CFL Draft, and a conditional draft pick in the 2013 CFL draft to Winnipeg for Odell Willis and a conditional fifth round draft pick in the 2013 CFL draft.

=== Round five ===
- Saskatchewan → Winnipeg (PD). Saskatchewan traded this selection, a sixth round pick in the 2010 CFL draft, Adarius Bowman, Jean-François Morin-Roberge, Brady Browne, and a player from the Roughriders negotiation list to Winnipeg for a fifth round pick in the 2009 CFL draft, a fifth round pick in the 2011 or 2012 CFL Draft, the option to swap first round picks in the 2010 CFL draft, Dan Goodspeed, and the rights to Tyler Roehl.
- Winnipeg → Calgary (PD). Winnipeg traded this selection conditionally to Calgary for Pat MacDonald.
- Winnipeg → BC (PD). Winnipeg traded this selection conditionally to BC for Kelly Bates.
- BC → Edmonton (D). BC traded this selection, the fourth overall pick, and the 14th overall pick in this year's draft to Edmonton for the second overall pick and the 20th overall pick in this year's draft.
- Calgary → Saskatchewan (D). Calgary traded this selection and the 12th overall pick in this year's draft to Saskatchewan for the 15th overall pick in this year's draft and a second round pick in the 2013 CFL draft.

=== Round six ===
- Hamilton → Toronto (PD). Hamilton traded this selection conditionally to Toronto for Steve Schmidt.
- Edmonton → Montreal (PD). Edmonton traded this selection and a sixth-round pick in the 2013 CFL draft to Montreal for Dylan Steenbergen.
- Winnipeg → Calgary (PD). Winnipeg traded this selection to Calgary for Neil Ternovatsky.

== Forfeitures ==
- Winnipeg forfeits their first round selection after selecting Kito Poblah in the 2011 Supplemental Draft.
- Edmonton forfeits their second round selection after selecting Ted Laurent in the 2011 Supplemental Draft.
- BC forfeits their sixth round selection after selecting Alex Ellis in the 2011 Supplemental Draft.

== Round one ==
Rnd.	Pick #	CFL team	Player	Pos.	School	Conf.	Notes
1	1	Saskatchewan Roughriders	Ben Heenan	OL	Saskatchewan	CWUAA	
1	2	BC Lions	Jabar Westerman	DL	Eastern Michigan	MAC	via Edmonton via Toronto
1	3	Winnipeg Blue Bombers	Tyson Pencer	OL	Washington State	Pac-12	via Hamilton
1	4	Edmonton Eskimos	Austin Pasztor	OL	Virginia	ACC	via BC via Montreal
1	5	Calgary Stampeders	Ameet Pall	DE	Wofford	SoCon	
1	6	Edmonton Eskimos	Shamawd Chambers	WR	Wilfrid Laurier	OUA	
1	-	Winnipeg Blue Bombers					Forfeit Pick
1	7	BC Lions	Kirby Fabien	OL	Calgary	CWUAA	

== Round two ==
= CFL Division All-Star	= CFL All-Star	= Hall of Famer

Rnd.	Pick #	CFL team	Player	Pos.	School	Conf.	Notes
2	8	Hamilton Tiger-Cats	Courtney Stephen	DB	Northern Illinois	MAC	via Winnipeg via Saskatchewan
2	9	Toronto Argonauts	Cleyon Laing	DL	Iowa State	Big 12	
2	10	Hamilton Tiger-Cats	Frédéric Plesius	LB	Laval	RSEQ	
2	11	Montreal Alouettes	Patrick Lavoie	RB	Laval	RSEQ	
2	12	Saskatchewan Roughriders	Samuel Hurl	LB	Calgary	CWUAA	via Calgary
2	-	Edmonton Eskimos					Forfeit Pick
2	13	Hamilton Tiger-Cats	Carson Rockhill	OL	Calgary	CWUAA	via Winnipeg
2	14	Edmonton Eskimos	Justin Capicciotti	DL	Simon Fraser	GNAC	via BC

== Round three ==
Rnd.	Pick #	CFL team	Player	Pos.	School	Conf.	Notes
3	15	Calgary Stampeders	Keenan MacDougall	DB	Saskatchewan	CWUAA	via Saskatchewan
3	16	Winnipeg Blue Bombers	Johnny Aprile	WR	Queen's	OUA	via Toronto
3	17	Hamilton Tiger-Cats	Arnaud Gascon-Nadon	DE	Laval	RSEQ	
3	18	Montreal Alouettes	Bo Adebayo	DL	Western Kentucky	Sun Belt	
3	19	Calgary Stampeders	Billy Peach	OL	Jacksonville	Pioneer	
3	20	Hamilton Tiger-Cats	Michael Atkinson	DL	Boise State	MW	via BC via Edmonton
3	21	Winnipeg Blue Bombers	Christo Bilukidi	DE	Georgia State	Ind. (FCS)	
3	22	BC Lions	Matt Norman	OL	Western Ontario	OUA	

== Round four ==
Rnd.	Pick #	CFL team	Player	Pos.	School	Conf.	Notes
4	23	Winnipeg Blue Bombers	Rene Stephan	LB	Harding	GAC	via Saskatchewan
4	24	Toronto Argonauts	Herve Tonye-Tonye	LB	Northern Colorado	Big Sky	
4	25	Hamilton Tiger-Cats	Simon Charbonneau-Campeau	WR	Sherbrooke	RSEQ	
4	26	Montreal Alouettes	Lance Milton	DB	British Columbia	CWUAA	
4	27	Calgary Stampeders	Bradley Erdos	OL	Simon Fraser	GNAC	
4	28	Toronto Argonauts	Quincy Hurst	WR	Manitoba	CWUAA	via Edmonton
4	29	Winnipeg Blue Bombers	Jake Thomas	DL	Acadia	AUS	
4	30	Calgary Stampeders	Adam Berger	DB	Simon Fraser	GNAC	via BC

== Round five ==
Rnd.	Pick #	CFL team	Player	Pos.	School	Conf.	Notes
5	31	Calgary Stampeders	Mike Filer	OL	Mount Allison	AUS	via Winnipeg via Saskatchewan
5	32	Toronto Argonauts	Luke Willson	TE	Rice	C-USA	
5	33	Hamilton Tiger-Cats	Bo Palmer	RB	Simon Fraser	GNAC	
5	34	Montreal Alouettes	Bryn Roy	LB	Texas A&M–Commerce	LSC	
5	35	Saskatchewan Roughriders	Kevin Régimbald-Gagné	LB	Sherbrooke	RSEQ	via Calgary
5	36	Edmonton Eskimos	Hasan Hazime	DE	Akron	N/A	
5	37	BC Lions	Jordan Verdone	LB	Calgary	CWUAA	via Winnipeg
5	38	Edmonton Eskimos	Ryan King	LB	Saint Mary's	AUS	via BC

== Round six ==
Rnd.	Pick #	CFL team	Player	Pos.	School	Conf.	Notes
6	39	Saskatchewan Roughriders	Ismaël Bamba	WR	Sherbrooke	RSEQ	
6	40	Toronto Argonauts	Aaron Crawford	LB	Saint Mary's	AUS	
6	41	Toronto Argonauts	Shea Pierre	DB	Windsor	N/A	via Hamilton
6	42	Montreal Alouettes	Keynan Parker	DB	Oregon State	Pac-12	
6	43	Calgary Stampeders	Jordan Spence	DL	Eastern Oregon	N/A	
6	44	Montreal Alouettes	Ryan White	OL	Bishop's	N/A	via Edmonton
6	45	Calgary Stampeders	Wilkerson Desouza	LB	Toronto	N/A	via Winnipeg
6	-	BC Lions					Forfeit Pick
