= Johnny Aprile =

Canadian football player (born 1989)

Profile
- Position: Wide receiver

Personal information
- Born: June 12, 1989 (age 37); Toronto, Ontario
- Listed height: 6 ft 2 in (1.88 m)
- Listed weight: 208 lb (94 kg)

Career information
- University: Queen's
- CFL draft: 2012: 3rd round, 16th overall pick

Career history
- 2012: Winnipeg Blue Bombers*
- 2014–2017: Hamilton Tiger-Cats
- 2018: Edmonton Eskimos*
- * Offseason or practice squad member only
- Stats at CFL.ca

Giovanni "Johnny" Aprile (born June 12, 1989) is a retired Canadian football wide receiver. He was selected 16th overall by the Winnipeg Blue Bombers in the 2012 CFL draft. After the 2011 CIS season, he was ranked as the 12th best player in the Canadian Football League’s Amateur Scouting Bureau final rankings for players eligible in the 2012 CFL draft, and seventh by players in Canadian Interuniversity Sport. He played CIS football for the Queen's Golden Gaels in Canadian Interuniversity Sport football.

== Professional career ==
Aprile was selected 16th overall on May 3, 2012, in the 2012 CFL draft by the Winnipeg Blue Bombers. He was signed by the Blue Bombers on May 25, 2012, where the team planned to convert him to defensive back.

Johnny Aprile was released on June 21, 2012, by the Blue Bombers to allow Aprile to return for Queens to play for the Golden Gaels in the 2012–2013 season

On January 29, 2014, the Blue Bombers traded Aprile's rights to the Hamilton Tiger-Cats for defensive back Matt Bucknor. He was later signed by the Tiger-Cats on March 28, 2014. He was signed by the Edmonton Eskimos in 2018, but was later released by the team after not playing a single game all season. Aprile remains unsigned since the 2018 season.
