= Hasan Hazime =

Canadian football player (born 1987)

Profile
- Position: Defensive lineman

Personal information
- Born: December 23, 1987 (age 38); Pickering, Ontario, Canada
- Listed height: 6 ft 5 in (1.96 m)
- Listed weight: 280 lb (127 kg)

Career information
- High school: Pickering High
- College: Wake Forest
- CFL draft: 2012: 5th round, 36th overall pick

Career history
- 2013–2015: Hamilton Tiger-Cats
- 2016: Saskatchewan Roughriders
- 2017: Edmonton Eskimos*
- * Offseason or practice squad member only
- Stats at CFL.ca

Hasan Hazime (born December 23, 1987) is a Canadian former professional football defensive lineman. He was drafted 36th overall by the Edmonton Eskimos in the 2012 CFL draft and had his rights traded to the Hamilton Tiger-Cats on February 27, 2013. Hazime then signed with Hamilton on May 23, 2013 and spent three seasons with the club. He signed with the Saskatchewan Roughriders as a free agent on February 24, 2016. He played college football for the Wake Forest Demon Deacons.
