= Austin Pasztor =

Canadian gridiron football player (born 1990)

No. 67, 68
- Position: Offensive tackle

Personal information
- Born: November 26, 1990 (age 35); Langton, Ontario, Canada
- Listed height: 6 ft 7 in (2.01 m)
- Listed weight: 305 lb (138 kg)

Career information
- High school: Fork Union Military Academy (Fork Union, Virginia, U.S.)
- College: Virginia
- NFL draft: 2012: undrafted
- CFL draft: 2012: 1st round, 4th overall pick

Career history
- Minnesota Vikings (2012)*; Jacksonville Jaguars (2012–2014); Cleveland Browns (2015–2016); Atlanta Falcons (2017–2018); Tennessee Titans (2018)
- * Offseason or practice squad member only

Awards and highlights
- Second-team All-American (2011); First-team All-ACC (2011)

Career NFL statistics
- Games played: 67
- Games started: 43
- Stats at Pro Football Reference

Austin William Pasztor (born November 26, 1990) is a Canadian former professional football player who was an offensive tackle in the National Football League (NFL). He played college football for the Virginia Cavaliers and was signed by the Minnesota Vikings as an undrafted free agent in 2012.

== Early life ==
Pasztor attended Glendale High School before transferring to Fork Union Military Academy.

== College career ==
Pasztor finished his college eligibility with the Virginia Cavaliers. He was selected fourth overall by the Edmonton Eskimos in the 2012 CFL draft. He was ranked as the fourth best player in the Canadian Football League's Amateur Scouting Bureau final rankings for players eligible in the 2012 CFL draft.

== Professional career ==
=== Minnesota Vikings ===
On April 29, 2012, Pasztor signed with the Minnesota Vikings. On August 31, 2012, as the Vikings reduced their roster down to league maximum of 53 players, he was released.

=== Jacksonville Jaguars ===
Pasztor was signed to the Jacksonville Jaguars practice squad on September 17, 2012. He was promoted to the active roster on December 14. He started three games for the Jaguars in 2012.

On October 2, 2013, the Jaguars announced that they had traded starting left tackle Eugene Monroe to the Baltimore Ravens. Monroe's left tackle position was filled by Luke Joeckel, paving the way for Pasztor to become the team's starting right tackle despite the fact he had been primarily used at guard in the past. Overall, in the 2013 season, he appeared in 15 games and started 13. In the 2014 season, he appeared in and started eight games.

He was released by the Jaguars on September 5, 2015.

=== Cleveland Browns ===
Pasztor was claimed off waivers by the Cleveland Browns on September 6, 2015. On March 22, 2016, Pasztor was offered a one-year tender. He signed his tender on April 4. Overall, in the 2015 season, he appeared in all 16 games and started four. In the 2016 season, he appeared in and started all 16 games.

=== Atlanta Falcons ===
On August 19, 2017, Pasztor signed with the Atlanta Falcons. In the 2017 season, he appeared in seven games.

On March 13, 2018, Pasztor signed a one-year contract extension with the Falcons. He was released on August 31, 2018. He was re-signed on October 24, 2018. He was released again on November 8, 2018.

=== Tennessee Titans ===
On December 11, 2018, Pasztor was signed by the Tennessee Titans. He was released on August 31, 2019.

== Personal life ==
During the 2018 and 2019 offseasons, Pasztor hosted Pasztor's Principles Football Camp and Combine, a free skills camp for students from seventh grade to high school in Brantford, Ontario. Every offseason since 2017, Pasztor has been working toward earning his master's degree in business.
