= Ben Heenan =

Canadian football player (born 1990)

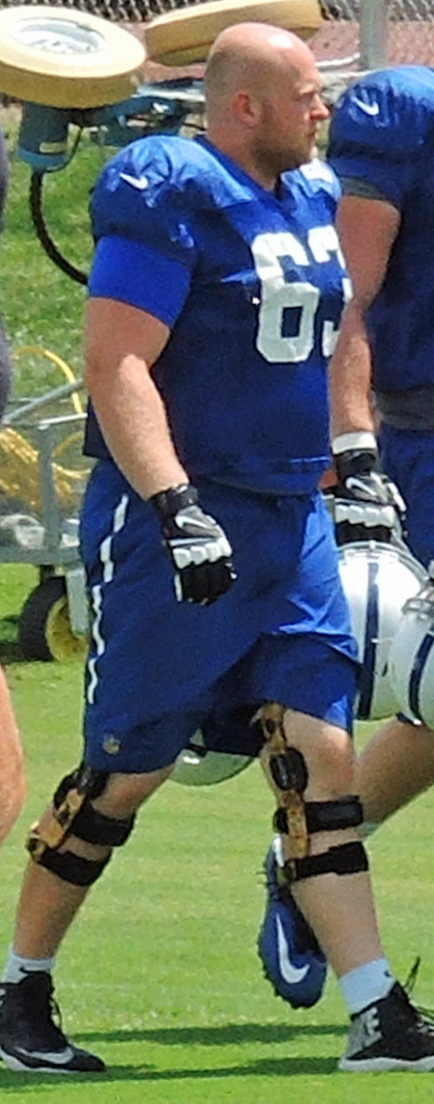
- Heenan at the 2015 Indianapolis Colts training camp

No. 65, 63
- Position: Guard

Personal information
- Born: February 5, 1990 (age 36); Regina, Saskatchewan, Canada
- Listed height: 6 ft 4 in (1.93 m)
- Listed weight: 316 lb (143 kg)

Career information
- High school: Sheldon-Williams Collegiate (Regina, Saskatchewan, Canada)
- University: Saskatchewan
- CFL draft: 2012: 1st round, 1st overall pick

Career history
- Saskatchewan Roughriders (2012–2014); Indianapolis Colts (2015)*
- * Offseason or practice squad member only

Awards and highlights
- Grey Cup champion (2013)
- Stats at CFL.ca (archive)

Ben Heenan (born February 5, 1990) is a Canadian former professional football guard who played for the Saskatchewan Roughriders of Canadian Football League (CFL). Heenan played CIS football for the University of Saskatchewan, and was ranked as the second best player in the CFL's Amateur Scouting Bureau final rankings for players eligible in the 2012 CFL draft, and first by players in Canadian Interuniversity Sport, at the end of the 2011 CIS season.

== Professional career ==
=== Saskatchewan Roughriders ===
Heenan was selected first overall in the 2012 CFL draft by the Saskatchewan Roughriders of Canadian Football League. Heenan spent three years as a member of the Roughriders, including in 2013 when he won his first Grey Cup championship as a member of the 101st Grey Cup-winning team. As a pending free agent, he was released on February 2, 2015, so that he could pursue National Football League opportunities.

=== Indianapolis Colts ===
On February 3, 2015, Heenan signed a 3-year, $1.575 million contract with the Indianapolis Colts. He joined Henoc Muamba as the second player signed by the Colts to have been selected first overall in the CFL Draft. Heenan was released in August after tearing his meniscus. On November 3, the Colts signed Heenan to their practice squad. Heenan announced his retirement from football on April 7, 2016.
