= Herve Tonye-Tonye =

Cameroonian gridiron football player (born 1988)

No. 42
- Position: Linebacker

Personal information
- Born: May 15, 1988 (age 38); Yaoundé, Cameroon
- Listed height: 5 ft 11 in (1.80 m)
- Listed weight: 223 lb (101 kg)

Career information
- College: Alcorn State; Northern Colorado
- CFL draft: 2012: 4th round, 24th overall pick

Career history
- 2013–2015: Toronto Argonauts
- 2016: Winnipeg Blue Bombers*
- 2016: Ottawa Red Blacks
- * Offseason or practice squad member only

Awards and highlights
- Grey Cup champion (2016)
- Stats at CFL.ca

Herve Tonye-Tonye (born May 15, 1988) is a Cameroon-Canadian former professional football linebacker. He was drafted 24th overall by the Argonauts in the 2012 CFL draft, but played out his final year of college eligibility before signing with the team on May 24, 2013. He played college football for the Alcorn State Braves and the Northern Colorado Bears.
