= Keith Godding =

Canadian football player (born 1984)

No. 81
- Position: Wide receiver

Personal information
- Born: January 23, 1984 (age 42); Ajax, Ontario, Canada
- Listed height: 6 ft 0 in (1.83 m)
- Listed weight: 190 lb (86 kg)

Career information
- University: Bishop's
- CFL draft: 2008: undrafted

Career history
- 2008–2009: Montreal Alouettes*
- 2010: Toronto Argonauts
- 2012: BC Lions*
- 2013: Edmonton Eskimos*
- * Offseason or practice squad member only
- Stats at CFL.ca (archive)

Keith Godding (born January 23, 1984) is a Canadian former professional football wide receiver who played for the Toronto Argonauts of the Canadian Football League. He was signed as an undrafted free agent by the Montreal Alouettes in 2008. He played CIS football for the Bishop's Gaiters.

Godding was also a member of the BC Lions and Edmonton Eskimos but did not play in any games for those teams.
