= International Bowl presented by USA Football =

High school football game

The International Bowl is a high school football game held each January in Arlington, Texas at AT&T Stadium. It features USA Football and the American football governing bodies of international countries. The series of games pit the US National Football Team against teams from other countries and regions around the world.

The game began as a tournament in 2009 featuring the United States, Canada, Mexico and France before moving to a single game in a USA vs. The World format. In 2017, the event was expanded from one game to several games over multiple days and features teams of several ages from U19 to U15.

The game has been broadcast on NFL Network, CBS Sports and ESPN. The United States won the first five meetings against Canada, Mexico, France and the World Team. The World Team was the first to defeat Team USA, with a 35–29 win in the 2012 International Bowl.

== Participating teams ==
International Bowl teams
Team	Nation(s)
USA Football	United States
Football Canada	Canada
Team Nordic	Norway, Sweden, Finland, Denmark
Autonomous University of Nuevo León	Mexico
Japan	Japan
British Columbia	Canada
Laguna Select	Mexico
Ontario	Canada
Panama Sharks	Panama
Israel	Israel

== Results ==
- Winning team in **bold**
- Tie game denoted in italics

=== 2009 ===
Date	Winning team	Score	Losing team	Score
2009	**USA**	**41**	Canada	3
2009	**USA**	**78**	France	0
2009	**USA**	**55**	Mexico	0

=== USA vs. The World ===
Date	Winning team	Score	Losing team	Score
2010	**USA**	**17**	The World	0
2011	**USA**	**21**	The World	14
2012	**The World**	**35**	USA	29
2013	**USA**	**42**	The World	10
2015	**USA**	**20**	The World	15

=== 2017 ===
Age	Winning team	Score	Losing team	Score
U-14	US-Stripes	30	US-Stars	19
U-15	US-Honor	41	US-Pride	29
U-15	US-Stars	34	US-Stripes	33
U-16	US-National	63	Ontario	0
U-16	Team Alberta	37	US-Select	16
U-17	US-National	44	Japan	7
U-17	US-Select	42	Saskatchewan	15
U-18	US-Select	21	Ontario	7
U-19	US-National	33	Canada	11

=== 2018 ===
Age	Winning team	Score	Losing team	Score
U-14	US-Stars	63	US-Stripes	48
U-14/15	US-Stars	20	US-Stripes	0
U-15	US-Select	62	Laguna Select	0
U-16	US-Select	47	Chihuahua	0
U-16	US-National	50	UANL Mexico	0
U-17	US-Stars	49	Football Ontario	6
U-17	Japan	21	US-Stripes	6
U-17	US-National	50	British Columbia	6
U-18	UANL Mexico	20	US-Select	9
U-18	Football Canada	44	US-National	26
U-19	US-Select	48	Nordic	13
U-19	US-National	47	Canada	7

=== 2019 ===
Age	Winning team	Score	Losing team	Score
U-16	US-National	47	Caballeros	0
U-16	US-Select	29	Mexico Norte	22
U-17	US-National	28	Japan	24
U-17	US-Select	61	Ontario	7
U-18	US-National	27	Canada	10
U-18	Panama	30	US-Select	25
U-19	US-National	50	Tamaulipas	0
U-19	US-Select	53	Nuevo Leon	0

=== 2020 ===
Age	Winning team	Score	Losing team	Score
U-16	US-National	66	Coahuila	0
U-16	Panama	45	U- Select	41
U-17	Japan	28	US-National	20
U-17	US-Select	51	Mexico Norte	7
U-18	US-National	29	Canada	14
U-18	US-Select	75	Mexico Queretaro	0
U-19	US-National	67	Panama	0
Adult W Flag	Osas Tijuana	24	Diablas	6
Adult M Flag	US Stars	51	Israel	35

== Notable participants ==
- Todd Gurley – Los Angeles Rams, college football player at Georgia.
- Tyrann Mathieu - Chiefs, SEC Defensive Player of the Year (2011)
- Jameis Winston – Buccaneers, college football player at Florida State and Heisman Trophy winner.
- Eno Benjamin - Arizona State: During his sophomore season in 2018, he broke the school record for rushing yards in a game with 312.
- Laviska Shenault Jr. - Colorado: First-team All-Pac-12 (2018)
- D'Andre Swift – Georgia: Second-Team All-SEC (2018)
- Ben Brown - Ole Miss: 2018 SEC All-Freshman Team
- Stephon Tuitt - Steelers, Second-team AP All-American (2012)
- Malcom Brown - Saints, Second Team All-Big 12 (2014)
- Jordan Poyer - Bills, First-team All-Pac-12 (2012)
- Devin Funchess - Colts, 2× Second-team All-Big Ten (2013, 2014)
- Taylor Rapp - Rams, 2× First-team All-Pac-12 (2017, 2018)
- Dalton Risner - Broncos, 3× First-team All-Big 12 (2016, 2017, 2018)
- Dwayne Haskins Jr. - Redskins, Big Ten Player of the Year (2018)
- N'Keal Harry - Patriots, 2× First-team All-Pac-12 (2017, 2018)
- Mecole Hardman - Chiefs, 2× All-SEC Second Team (2017, 2018)
- Vosean Joseph - Bills, 2018 Peach Bowl
- Justin Jackson - Chargers, Jackson became the leading rusher in Northwestern history and became the ninth player in NCAA history to have four years with 1,000 yards.
- Isaiah Wynn - Patriots, Super Bowl champion
- Shaquem Griffin - Seahawks, AAC Defensive Player of the Year
- Samaje Perine - Bengals, Big 12 Offensive Freshman of the Year (2014)
- Jourdan Lewis - Cowboys, Big Ten Defensive Back of the Year (2016)
- Ty Montgomery - Jets, First-team All-Pac-12 (2013)
- Harrison Phillips - Bills, First-team All-Pac-12 (2017)
- Wyatt Teller - Browns, First team All-ACC (2017)
- Ethan Pocic - Seahawks First-team All-SEC (2016)
- Aaron Dobson – college football player at Marshall
- Jacob Ruby – college football player for Richmond Spiders and CFL Edmonton Eskimos
