= Frédéric Plesius =

Canadian football player (born 1988)

No. 33, 39, 53, 44
- Position: Linebacker

Personal information
- Born: February 10, 1988 (age 38); Laval, Quebec, Canada
- Listed height: 6 ft 1 in (1.85 m)
- Listed weight: 245 lb (111 kg)

Career information
- High school: Champlain Prep School
- College: Baylor
- University: Laval
- CFL draft: 2012: 2nd round, 10th overall pick

Career history
- 2013–2016: Hamilton Tiger-Cats
- 2017: Montreal Alouettes
- 2018: Winnipeg Blue Bombers
- 2019: Montreal Alouettes
- 2021: Montreal Alouettes

Awards and highlights
- 2× Vanier Cup champion (2010, 2012); Presidents' Trophy (2012)
- Stats at CFL.ca

Frédéric Gelin Plesius (born February 10, 1988) is a Canadian former professional football linebacker who played in Canadian Football League (CFL) for the Hamilton Tiger-Cats, Montreal Alouettes, and Winnipeg Blue Bombers. Plesius made his professional debut for the Tiger-Cats in 2013.

== College career ==
Plesius first played for the Baylor University Bears, where he was a redshirt in 2008. He then played CIS football with the Laval Rouge et Or where he was a two-time Vanier Cup champion in 2010 and 2012.

== Professional career ==
In May 2012, Plesius was invited to rookie minicamp on a tryout basis with the Philadelphia Eagles of the National Football League.

=== Hamilton Tiger-Cats ===
After the 2011 CIS season, he was ranked as the fifth best player in the Canadian Football League’s Amateur Scouting Bureau final rankings for players eligible in the 2012 CFL draft, and third by players in Canadian Interuniversity Sport. Plesius was drafted in the second round (tenth overall) by the Hamilton Tiger-Cats of the Canadian Football League in the 2012 CFL draft. He spent the 2012 CFL season with the Laval Rouge et Or in the CIS. On June 24, 2013, following the CFL preseason games, he signed a 3-year contract with the Ti-cats. In his first season with the Tiger-Cats, Plesius was utilized primarily on special teams. In 2014, Plesius took on a larger role within the team defense as he accounted for 18 tackles, one interception and two fumble recoveries.

=== Montreal Alouettes (first stint) ===
On February 12, 2017, Plesius was traded to the Montreal Alouettes for Nicholas Shortill. He played in seven games with the team in 2017 and recorded seven special teams tackles. Following the season, he was released by the Alouettes on January 31, 2018.

=== Winnipeg Blue Bombers ===
On July 24, 2018, Plesius signed with the Winnipeg Blue Bombers. He played in six regular season games, recording four defensive tackles and five special teams tackles. He became a free agent after the 2018 season.

=== Montreal Alouettes (second stint) ===
On August 6, 2019, Plesius was re-signed by the Alouettes. He played in six regular season games and the team's lone post-season game where he recorded a total of five special teams tackles. His contract expired on February 11, 2020, and he was not signed by any team during the cancelled 2020 CFL season. He was re-signed by the Alouettes on October 4, 2021. He played in five games and recorded three special teams tackles. He was released on May 6, 2022.
