= Courtney Stephen =

Canadian football player (born 1989)

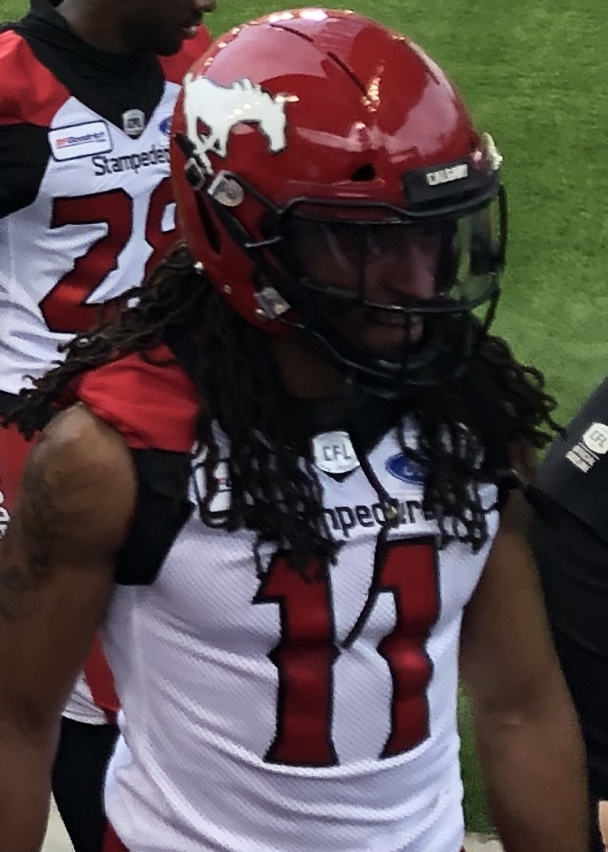
- Stephen before a Stampeders game in 2019.

No. 22
- Position: Defensive back

Personal information
- Born: October 27, 1989 (age 37); Brampton, Ontario
- Listed height: 6 ft 0 in (1.83 m)
- Listed weight: 194 lb (88 kg)

Career information
- College: Northern Illinois
- University: Wilfrid Laurier
- CFL draft: 2012: 2nd round, 8th overall pick

Career history
- 2013–2018: Hamilton Tiger-Cats
- 2019: Calgary Stampeders
- 2020–2021: Hamilton Tiger-Cats*
- * Offseason or practice squad member only
- Stats at CFL.ca

Courtney Stephen (born October 27, 1989) is a Canadian former professional football defensive back. He played CIS Football for the Wilfrid Laurier Golden Hawks from 2008 to 2009 before transferring and playing for the Northern Illinois Huskies from 2010 to 2012. He played in the Canadian Football League (CFL) from 2013 to 2020 for the Hamilton Tiger-Cats and Calgary Stampeders.

== Professional career ==
Stephen was drafted by the Hamilton Tiger-Cats eighth overall in the 2012 CFL draft and signed with the team on May 23, 2013. He played for the Tiger-Cats for six years before signing with the Calgary Stampeders on February 14, 2019. Upon becoming a free agent, he re-signed with the Tiger-Cats on February 11, 2020. He signed a contract extension with the Tiger-Cats on December 29, 2020. He retired from football on June 24, 2021.
