= Bo Palmer =

Canadian football player (born 1990)

No. 34, 0
- Position: Running back

Personal information
- Born: March 7, 1990 (age 36); North Vancouver, British Columbia, Canada
- Listed height: 5 ft 9 in (1.75 m)
- Listed weight: 190 lb (86 kg)

Career information
- High school: Windsor (BC)
- College: Simon Fraser
- CFL draft: 2012: 5th round, 33rd overall pick

Career history
- 2013–2014: Hamilton Tiger-Cats
- 2014: Calgary Stampeders

Awards and highlights
- Grey Cup champion (2014)

Career statistics
- Games: 1

Deronn "Bo" Palmer (born March 7, 1990) is a Canadian former gridiron football running back who played one season in the Canadian Football League (CFL) for the Hamilton Tiger-Cats. He played college football for Simon Fraser and was drafted in the 5th round (33rd overall) of the 2012 CFL draft by the Tiger-Cats. He later was on the practice roster of the Calgary Stampeders, and won the 102nd Grey Cup in 2014.

== Early life and education ==
Bo Palmer was born on March 7, 1990, in North Vancouver, British Columbia. He attended Windsor High School there, earning multiple awards as a quarterback. As a high school freshman in 2004, Palmer was named student-athlete of the year and was given the North Vancouver Certificate of Achievement award. He converted to running back in his next years at Windsor. Following his graduation in 2008, Palmer joined Simon Fraser University. Simon Fraser moved from CIS to NCAA football in 2010, as Palmer was named academic all-GNAC conference. His team recorded their first NCAA win in October 2011, following a game against Dixie State in which Palmer ran 31 times for 178 yards and two touchdowns. He was selected in the 5th round of the 2012 CFL draft following the season, but chose to remain in college. He was named a GNAC conference all-star after his senior season.

== Professional career ==
After graduating from college, Palmer joined the Hamilton Tiger-Cats, who drafted him in the 5th round (33rd overall) of the 2012 CFL draft. He retired at the end of training camp. He rejoined the team in August 2014, and was placed on the practice roster to start the season. He was activated for one game before being released on November 4. He was signed to the practice roster of the Calgary Stampeders on November 14. He spent the rest of the season there, and was a member of their Grey Cup championship team. He was released in May 2015.
