= Billy Peach =

Canadian football player (born 1990)

No. 57
- Position: Offensive lineman

Personal information
- Born: March 28, 1990 (age 36); St. John's, Newfoundland and Labrador, Canada
- Listed height: 6 ft 4 in (1.93 m)
- Listed weight: 313 lb (142 kg)

Career information
- College: Jacksonville
- CFL draft: 2012: 3rd round, 19th overall pick

Career history
- 2013–2014: Calgary Stampeders

Awards and highlights
- Grey Cup champion (2014)

Billy Peach (born March 28, 1990) is a Canadian former professional football offensive lineman who played for one season for the Calgary Stampeders of the Canadian Football League (CFL) in 2013. After playing college football for the Jacksonville Dolphins, he was drafted in the third round, 19th overall by the Stampeders in the 2012 CFL draft, and signed a professional contract with the team on December 5, 2012. He played in three games in 2013, and spent the entire 2014 season on the team's practice roster. He was released before the start of the 2015 season on May 14, 2015.
