= Keynan Parker =

Canadian football player (born 1990)

No. 20
- Position: Defensive back

Personal information
- Born: November 17, 1990 (age 35); Coquitlam, British Columbia, Canada
- Listed height: 6 ft 0 in (1.83 m)
- Listed weight: 183 lb (83 kg)

Career information
- College: Simon Fraser; Oregon State
- CFL draft: 2012: 6th round, 42nd overall pick

Career history
- 2013: Montreal Alouettes*
- 2013–2017: BC Lions
- * Offseason or practice squad member only
- Stats at CFL.ca

Keynan Parker (born November 17, 1990) is a Canadian former professional football defensive back who played for the BC Lions of the Canadian Football League (CFL). He was drafted 42nd overall in the 2012 CFL draft by the Montreal Alouettes. He played college football with the Oregon State Beavers and Simon Fraser Clan.

== Early life ==
During his amateur playing days, Keynan was also an accomplished track and field athlete and often distinguished himself as one of the fastest players on his team. In 2007, he set the Canadian youth record in the 200 meter sprint (21.44 seconds) at the Royal Canadian Legion Nationals before placing fifth at the World Youth Track and Field Championships in the 100 meter dash with a time of 10.61 in that same year.

== Professional career ==
=== Montreal Alouettes ===
Parker was drafted 42nd overall in the 2012 CFL draft by the Montreal Alouettes and signed with the club on May 17, 2013. Parker was part of the final cuts following the Alouettes' training camp in 2013.

=== BC Lions ===
Parker then signed with the BC Lions on June 25, 2013. He signed a two-year contract extension on January 4, 2017, keeping him signed with the Lions through the 2018 season. He was released by the Lions on May 11, 2018.

== Personal life ==
Keynan's father, James "Quick" Parker, is a member of the Canadian Football Hall of Fame.
