= Ameet Pall =

Canadian football player (born 1987)

No. 40, 45
- Position: Defensive end

Personal information
- Born: April 28, 1987 (age 39); Montreal, Quebec
- Listed height: 6 ft 1 in (1.85 m)
- Listed weight: 260 lb (118 kg)

Career information
- College: Wofford
- CFL draft: 2012: 1st round, 5th overall pick

Career history
- 2012: Calgary Stampeders*
- 2012–2014: Montreal Alouettes
- 2014: Winnipeg Blue Bombers
- * Offseason or practice squad member only
- Stats at CFL.ca

Ameet Pall (born April 28, 1987) is a retired Canadian football defensive end. He was selected fifth overall by the Calgary Stampeders in the 2012 CFL draft and was signed by the team on May 15, 2012. Following his release, he signed with the Alouettes on June 25, 2012. He was ranked as the seventh best player in the Canadian Football League's Amateur Scouting Bureau final rankings for players eligible in the 2012 CFL draft. He played college football for the Wofford Terriers. He was signed by the Winnipeg Blue Bombers on September 10, 2014.
