= Kirby Fabien =

Canadian football player (born 1990)

Profile
- Position: Offensive line coach

Personal information
- Born: September 10, 1990 (age 36); Calgary, Alberta, Canada
- Listed height: 6 ft 6 in (1.98 m)
- Listed weight: 325 lb (147 kg)

Career information
- High school: Bishop McNally High
- University: Calgary
- CFL draft: 2012: 1st round, 7th overall pick

Career history

Playing
- 2013–2017: BC Lions
- 2018: Montreal Alouettes

Coaching
- 2021–2024: UBC Thunderbirds (Offensive line coach)
- Stats at CFL.ca

Kirby Fabien (born September 10, 1990) is a Canadian former professional football offensive lineman.

== University career ==
Fabien played CIS football for the Calgary Dinos from 2008 to 2012.

== Professional career ==
=== BC Lions ===
After the 2011 CIS season, he was ranked as the 15th best player in the Canadian Football League’s Amateur Scouting Bureau final rankings for players eligible in the 2012 CFL draft, and ninth by players in Canadian Interuniversity Sport. He was selected seventh overall by the BC Lions in the 2012 CFL draft, but on May 28, 2012, the Calgary Dinos announced that he would be returning to play another year with them. He signed with the Lions during the following off-season on May 27, 2013. He spent five years with the Lions and played in 77 regular season games before becoming a free agent in 2018.

=== Montreal Alouettes ===
After remaining unsigned for over three months, Fabien signed with the Montreal Alouettes on May 24, 2018. He played in five games before being released on July 25, 2018.

== Coaching career ==
In 2021, Fabien was hired by his old coach, Blake Nill, to serve as the offensive line coach for the UBC Thunderbirds.
