= Brad Erdos =

Canadian football player (born 1990)

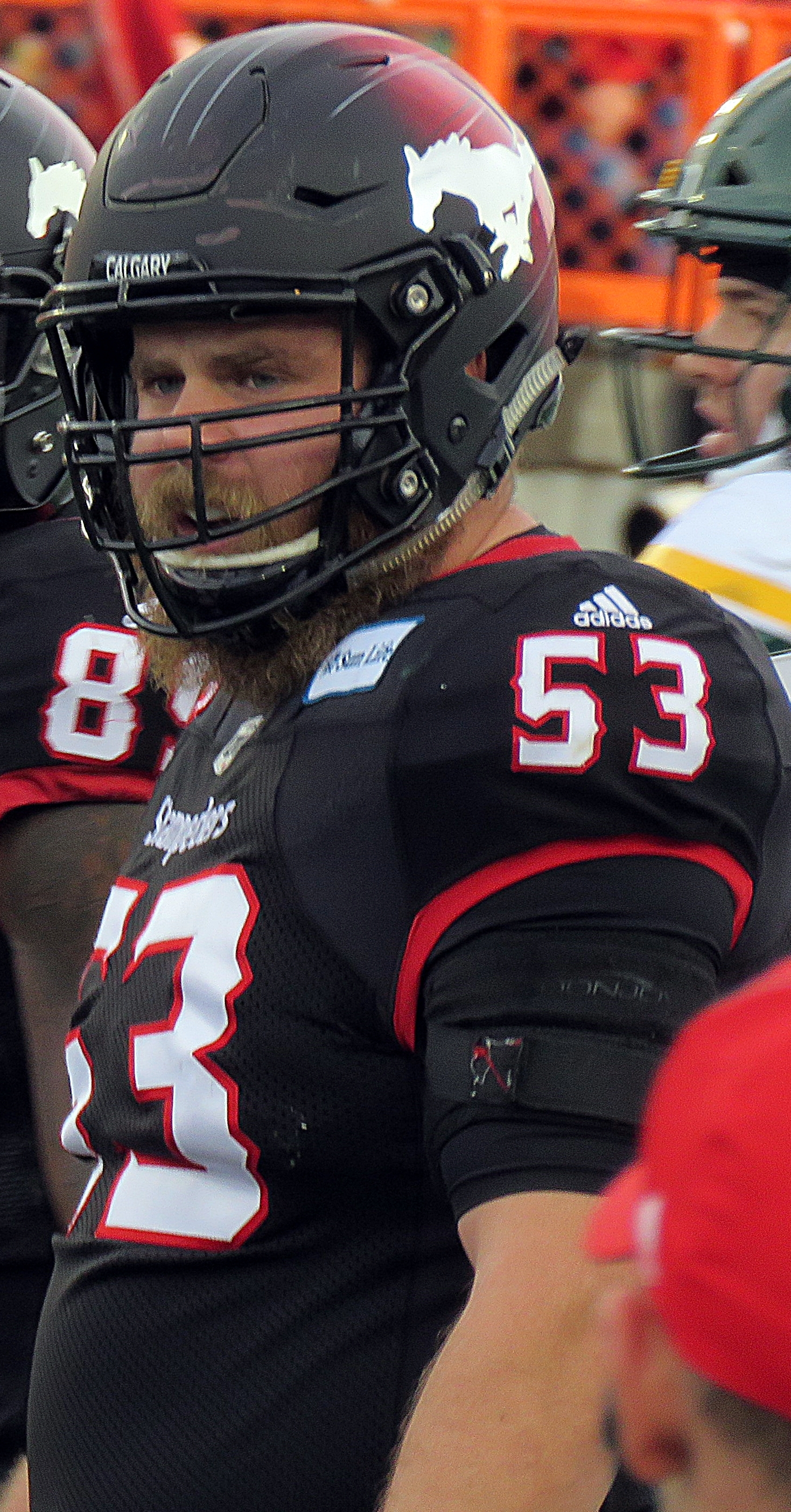
- Erdos in 2017

No. 53
- Position: Guard

Personal information
- Born: April 26, 1990 (age 36); Lethbridge, Alberta, Canada
- Listed height: 6 ft 3 in (1.91 m)
- Listed weight: 298 lb (135 kg)

Career information
- High school: Catholic Central (Lethbridge)
- College: Simon Fraser
- CFL draft: 2012: 4th round, 27th overall pick

Career history
- 2014–2020: Calgary Stampeders

Awards and highlights
- 2× Grey Cup champion (2014, 2018)
- Stats at CFL.ca

Bradley Erdos (born April 26, 1990) is a Canadian former professional football offensive lineman who played for six seasons for the Calgary Stampeders of the Canadian Football League (CFL). He was selected by the Stampeders in the fourth round of the 2012 CFL draft. He played college football at Simon Fraser University.

== Early life ==
Bradley Erdos was born on April 26, 1990, in Lethbridge, Alberta, Canada. He attended Catholic Central High School in Lethbridge.

== College career ==
Erdos played for the Simon Fraser Clan from 2008 to 2013. He missed the 2012 season due to an Achilles injury.

== Professional career ==
Erdos was selected by the Calgary Stampeders of the CFL with the 27th pick in the 2012 CFL draft and signed with the team on January 8, 2014. He made his CFL debut on September 21, 2014 in a game against the Montreal Alouettes. He played in three regular season games during his rookie year and was on the practice roster when the Stampeders won the 102nd Grey Cup championship. Erdos became a regular starter in 2015 and was the starting right guard when the Stampeders won the 106th Grey Cup in 2018. He missed the entire 2019 season due to a knee injury and did not play in 2020 due to the 2020 CFL season being cancelled. He announced his retirement from professional football on February 8, 2021.
