= Simon Charbonneau-Campeau =

Canadian football player (born 1988)

No. 87
- Position: Wide receiver

Personal information
- Born: May 2, 1988 (age 38); Saint-Jean-sur-Richelieu, Quebec, Canada
- Listed height: 6 ft 4 in (1.93 m)
- Listed weight: 195 lb (88 kg)

Career information
- University: Sherbrooke
- CFL draft: 2012: 4th round, 25th overall pick

Career history
- 2012–2013: Hamilton Tiger-Cats
- 2014–2016: Calgary Stampeders

Awards and highlights
- Grey Cup champion (2014)
- Stats at CFL.ca

Simon Charbonneau-Campeau (born May 2, 1988) is a Canadian former professional football wide receiver. He was selected 25th overall by the Hamilton Tiger-Cats in the 2012 CFL draft and was signed on May 30, 2012. After the 2011 CIS season, he was ranked as the ninth best player in the Canadian Football League’s Amateur Scouting Bureau final rankings for players eligible in the 2012 CFL draft, and fourth by players in Canadian Interuniversity Sport. He played CIS football with the Sherbrooke Vert et Or.

== Professional career ==
=== Hamilton Tiger-Cats ===
Charbonneau-Campeau was drafted by the Hamilton Tiger-Cats of the Canadian Football League in the 4th round of the 2012 CFL draft. In his first 2 seasons with the Ti-Cats he caught a total of 9 passes for 115 yards with no touchdowns.

=== Calgary Stampeders ===
On January 6, 2014, Charbonneau-Campeau was traded to the Calgary Stampeders in exchange for non-import WR Spencer Armstrong.
