= Lin-J Shell =

American gridiron football player (1981–2021)

No. 14
- Position: Defensive back

Personal information
- Born: October 22, 1981; Orlando, Florida, U.S.
- Died: July 29, 2021 (aged 39); Jacksonville, Florida, U.S.
- Listed height: 5 ft 11 in (1.80 m)
- Listed weight: 180 lb (82 kg)

Career information
- High school: Orlando (FL) Edgewater
- College: Jacksonville
- NFL draft: 2004: undrafted

Career history
- Orlando Predators (2004); Philadelphia Eagles (2005)*; Orlando Predators (2006–2007); New Orleans VooDoo (2008); Toronto Argonauts (2009–2011); BC Lions (2012–2013); Calgary Stampeders (2014); Winnipeg Blue Bombers (2015)
- * Offseason or practice squad member only

Awards and highlights
- Grey Cup champion (2014); 2× CFL East All-Star (2010, 2011)

Career CFL statistics
- Tackles: 280
- Sacks: 8
- Fumble recoveries: 9
- Interceptions: 8
- Stats at CFL.ca (archived)

Career AFL statistics
- Tackles: 277
- Pass breakups: 40
- Fumble recoveries: 6
- Interceptions: 12
- Total TDs: 4
- Stats at ArenaFan.com

Wagner Lindsell "Lin-J" Shell Jr. (October 22, 1981 – July 29, 2021) was an American professional football player who was a defensive back in the Canadian Football League (CFL). He was originally signed by the Arena Football League's (AFL) Orlando Predators as a street free agent in 2004. He played college football at Jacksonville.

Shell was also a member of the Philadelphia Eagles, New Orleans VooDoo, Calgary Stampeders (where he helped the team win the Grey Cup), Toronto Argonauts (where he was a 2-time CFL East All-Star), BC Lions, and Winnipeg Blue Bombers.

Subsequent to his all-star career with the CFL, Shell taught physical education at Jean Ribault High School in Jacksonville, Florida and coach Football and Jackson High school. On May 9, 2018, Shell was instrumental in preventing a woman from using her handgun in the school gymnasium following a "social media" brawl.

Shell died from a stroke in Florida on July 29, 2021, at the age 39. According to his family, he also tested positive for COVID-19 during the COVID-19 pandemic in Florida.
