= Adam Berger =

Canadian football player (born 1990)

No. 21
- Position: Defensive back

Personal information
- Born: June 28, 1990 (age 36); Vancouver, British Columbia, Canada
- Listed height: 6 ft 0 in (1.83 m)
- Listed weight: 207 lb (94 kg)

Career information
- High school: Lord Tweedsmuir Secondary
- University: Simon Fraser

Career history
- 2013–2016: Calgary Stampeders
- 2017: Ottawa Redblacks
- 2018: Calgary Stampeders

Awards and highlights
- 2× Grey Cup champion (2014) (2018)
- Stats at CFL.ca

Adam Berger (born June 28, 1990) is a Canadian former professional football defensive back. He is a two-time Grey Cup champion, having won in 2014 and 2018 with the Calgary Stampeders.

== Early career ==
Berger played high school football at Lord Tweedsmuir Secondary School as a quarterback. In 2007, he was named the province's Player of the Year.

He played college football for the Simon Fraser Clan from 2008 to 2012. Berger was a medical redshirt in 2008 and played only one game in 2009. In 29 games from 2010 to 2012, he recorded 117 total tackles, eight interceptions including three touchdowns, and two forced fumbles. During his final year, he also contributed as a kicker.

== Professional career ==
=== Calgary Stampeders ===
Berger entered the 2012 CFL draft and was drafted in the fourth round with the 30th overall pick by the Calgary Stampeders. Instead of immediately signing with the Stampeders, Berger elected to play for the Simon Fraser Clan in 2012. On January 30, 2013, he signed with the Stampeders. After spending time on the practice squad, Berger made his CFL debut on September 13 in Week 12 against the Hamilton Tiger-Cats and registered one tackle before being moved back to the practice squad for the remainder of the season.

In 2014, Berger entered the season in a backup role, spending time as a corner and safety before securing the starting position as a free safety. He played in all 18 regular season games, recording six tackles and nine special teams tackles. Additionally, Berger played in two post-season games including the 102nd Grey Cup, where the Stampeders defeated the Hamilton Tiger-Cats 20–16. Following the 2016 season he was not re-signed by the Stampeders and became a free-agent.

=== Ottawa Redblacks ===
Berger signed with the Ottawa Redblacks on February 15, 2017, the second day of free agency.

=== Calgary Stampeders ===
Berger signed with Calgary on February 13, 2018.

He retired from football in May 2019.
