= Cody Husband =

Canadian football player (born 1988)

No. 62
- Position: Offensive lineman

Personal information
- Born: March 19, 1988 (age 38); New Westminster, British Columbia, Canada
- Listed height: 6 ft 7 in (2.01 m)
- Listed weight: 307 lb (139 kg)

Career information
- College: British Columbia
- CFL draft: 2010: undrafted

Career history
- 2011–2013: Hamilton Tiger-Cats
- 2014–2018: BC Lions
- Stats at CFL.ca

Cody Husband (born March 19, 1988) is a Canadian former professional football offensive lineman who played in the Canadian Football League (CFL). He signed as an undrafted free agent with the Hamilton Tiger-Cats on March 2, 2011. Husband played CIS football for the UBC Thunderbirds. He retired in May 2019.
