= Jordan Verdone =

Canadian football player (born 1989)

Profile
- Position: Linebacker

Personal information
- Born: April 7, 1989 (age 37); Echo Bay, Ontario, Canada
- Listed height: 5 ft 11 in (1.80 m)
- Listed weight: 235 lb (107 kg)

Career information
- University: Calgary; Waterloo
- CFL draft: 2012: 5th round, 37th overall pick
- Expansion draft: 2013: 3rd round

Career history
- 2012: BC Lions*
- 2013: Hamilton Tiger-Cats*
- 2013: Montreal Alouettes
- 2014–2015: Ottawa Redblacks
- * Offseason or practice squad member only

Awards and highlights
- 2008 Peter Gorman Trophy
- Stats at CFL.ca

Jordan David Verdone (born April 7, 1989) is a Canadian former professional football linebacker who played in the Canadian Football League (CFL). He was selected in the fifth round, 37th overall by the BC Lions in the 2012 CFL draft and after returning to school that year, he signed with the Montreal Alouettes for the 2013 season and made their opening day roster. He played CIS football for the Calgary Dinos in 2011 and 2012 following a two-year stint with the Waterloo Warriors.

== Professional career ==
Verdone was drafted in the fifth round, 37th overall by the BC Lions in the 2012 CFL draft and signed with the team on May 28, 2012. After spending time on the team's practice roster, he was released on July 3, 2012, and rejoined the Calgary Dinos. During the following off-season, he signed with the Hamilton Tiger-Cats on April 4, 2013, only to be released on April 24, 2013, following the team's spring workout. Soon after, Verdone signed with the Montreal Alouettes on May 25, 2013, and secured a spot on the opening day roster following training camp. He played in his first CFL game on Jun 27, 2013, against the Winnipeg Blue Bombers. On December 16, 2013, Verdone was drafted by the Ottawa Redblacks in the 2013 CFL expansion draft. He played with the team for two years before becoming a free agent in 2016.
