= Jabar Westerman =

Canadian football player (born 1989)

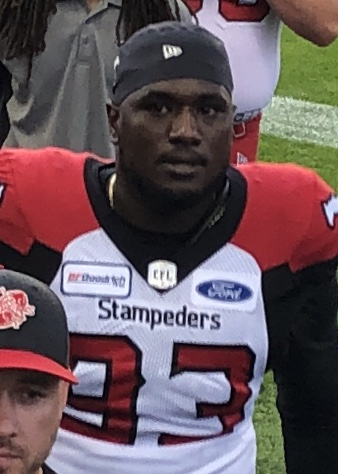
- Westerman with the Calgary Stampeders in 2019

No. 93
- Position: Defensive lineman

Personal information
- Born: May 13, 1989 (age 37); Brampton, Ontario, Canada
- Listed height: 6 ft 2 in (1.88 m)
- Listed weight: 285 lb (129 kg)

Career information
- College: Eastern Michigan
- CFL draft: 2012: 1st round, 2nd overall pick

Career history
- 2012–2016: BC Lions
- 2017–2018: Montreal Alouettes
- 2019: Calgary Stampeders

Awards and highlights
- 2012 - Jackie Parker Trophy

Career CFL statistics
- Tackles: 103
- Sacks: 18
- INTs: 1
- Forced fumbles: 4
- Stats at CFL.ca

Jabar Akil Westerman (born May 13, 1989) is a Canadian former professional football defensive lineman who played in the Canadian Football League (CFL). Westerman played college football with the Eastern Michigan Eagles for two years, putting up 48 tackles and 5.5 sacks.

== Professional career ==
Westerman was ranked as the eighth best player in the Canadian Football League’s Amateur Scouting Bureau final rankings for players eligible in the 2012 CFL draft. He was selected second overall by the BC Lions in the 2012 CFL draft and signed with the team on May 28, 2012. In five seasons with BC, Westerman recorded 75 tackles and 17 sacks in 85 games played. On February 14, 2017, he joined the Montreal Alouettes. In 2018, Westerman played alongside his brother Jamaal Westerman for several games before Jamaal was traded to rival Hamilton. 2018 was a season riddled with injuries for both brothers; Jamaal ended up with a season ending injury, while Jabar played in only seven games and recorded four tackles; it was his first season without a sack. He was released by Montreal in April 2019. On June 19, 2019, Westerman signed with the Calgary Stampeders. In 14 games, Westerman made 15 tackles, providing national depth along the defensive line which had suffered a series of injuries. He was released on January 29, 2020.
