= Matt Norman =

Canadian football player (born 1988)

No. 59
- Position: Offensive lineman

Personal information
- Born: June 20, 1988 (age 38); Châteauguay, Quebec, Canada
- Listed height: 6 ft 4 in (1.93 m)
- Listed weight: 320 lb (145 kg)

Career information
- University: Western Ontario
- CFL draft: 2012: 3rd round, 22nd overall pick

Career history
- 2012–2015: BC Lions
- Stats at CFL.ca (archive)

Medal record

Men's American football

Representing Canada

World Championship
Silver medal – second place	2011 Austria	Team competition

Matthew Norman (born June 20, 1988) is a Canadian former professional football offensive lineman for the BC Lions of the Canadian Football League (CFL). He was selected 22nd overall by the Lions in the 2012 CFL draft. After the 2011 CIS season, he was ranked as the tenth best player in the Canadian Football League's Amateur Scouting Bureau rankings for players eligible in the 2012 CFL draft, and fifth by players in Canadian Interuniversity Sport. He played CIS football with the Western Ontario Mustangs. He also took a year away from football in 2012–2013 to get his teaching degree and was a student teacher at H.B. Beal Secondary School, where he was loved by many of his students. He retired from football in June 2016.
