= Keenan MacDougall =

Canadian football player (born 1990)

No. 24
- Position: Defensive back

Personal information
- Born: March 18, 1990 (age 36); Saskatoon, Saskatchewan, Canada
- Listed height: 6 ft 2 in (1.88 m)
- Listed weight: 208 lb (94 kg)

Career information
- University: Saskatchewan
- CFL draft: 2012: 3rd round, 15th overall pick

Career history
- 2012–2014: Calgary Stampeders
- 2015: Saskatchewan Roughriders

Awards and highlights
- Grey Cup champion (2014)
- Stats at CFL.ca

Keenan MacDougall (born March 18, 1990) is a Canadian former professional football defensive back. He was selected 15th overall by the Stampeders in the 2012 CFL draft. After the 2011 CIS season, he was ranked as the 14th best player in the Canadian Football League’s Amateur Scouting Bureau final rankings for players eligible in the 2012 CFL draft, and eighth by players in Canadian Interuniversity Sport. He played CIS football with the Saskatchewan Huskies.

MacDougall played in his first regular-season CFL game on July 1, 2012 against the Montreal Alouettes. In the first quarter of that game, he picked up a Montreal fumble and ran it back 63 yards for a touchdown.
