= 2013 Saskatchewan Roughriders season =

CFL team season

- General manager: Brendan Taman
- Head coach: Corey Chamblin
- Home stadium: Mosaic Stadium at Taylor Field

Results
- Record: 11–7
- Division place: 2nd, West
- Playoffs: Won Grey Cup
- Team MOP: Kory Sheets
- Team MOC: Chris Getzlaf
- Team MOR: Levi Steinhauer

Uniform

The 2013 Saskatchewan Roughriders season was the 56th season for the team in the Canadian Football League (CFL). The Roughriders improved upon their 8–10 record from 2012 and made the playoffs for the second straight season, while hosting their first playoff game since 2010. After defeating the BC Lions and Calgary Stampeders in the playoffs, the Roughriders qualified for their fourth Grey Cup appearance in seven years and first ever at their home stadium. The team defeated the Hamilton Tiger-Cats 45–23 in the 101st Grey Cup en route to winning the franchise's fourth championship. With the added seats at Mosaic Stadium at Taylor Field, the Roughriders led the league in attendance for the first time, with an average of 37,503 fans attending each regular season game.

== Offseason ==
=== Coaches ===
The Riders began their offseason coaching changes by releasing defensive line coach Mike Walker, linebackers coach Alex Smith, and offensive line coach Kris Sweet. The team hired former Alouettes assistant coach Mike Sinclair to be the defensive line and assistant head coach, but he later joined Marc Trestman's staff with the Chicago Bears. Special teams coordinator Craig Dickenson also resigned with the club, moving to the Winnipeg Blue Bombers, while Bob Dyce moved into that role from the offensive coordinator position. Arguably, the team's biggest coaching hire was Dyce's replacement, George Cortez, the former head coach and coordinator for the Tiger-Cats, whose team led the league in points scored. They also hired Richard Kent to be another defensive backs coach and Doug Malone and Todd Howard to be the offensive and defensive line coaches, respectively.

=== Players ===
On January 24, 2013, the Riders traded Justin Harper and a 2014 4th-round pick to the BC Lions for six-time all-star and two-time Grey Cup champion Geroy Simon. Simon had been a member of the Lions since 2001.

The Roughriders were also lauded for signing many big name free agents, including the 2009 Most Outstanding Canadian and the 100th Grey Cup's Most Valuable Canadian, Ricky Foley. They also signed defensive backs Dwight Anderson, Weldon Brown, and linebacker Tristan Black.

On June 1, 2013, former Roughriders defensive end John Chick, who was released by the Jacksonville Jaguars of the NFL, signed with the Roughriders after much speculation.

=== CFL draft ===
The 2013 CFL draft took place on May 6, 2013. The Roughriders had seven selections total in the seven-round draft, after trading away their second-round pick during a 2012 draft trade and their fourth-round pick in a trade for Greg Carr. Their third-round pick was traded to Toronto for three fifth-round picks.

Round	Pick	Player	Position	School/Club team
1	4	Corey Watman	OL	Eastern Michigan
5	38	Matt Vonk	OL	Waterloo
5	39	Alex Anthony	WR	Wilfrid Laurier
5	40	Levi Steinhauer	DL	Saskatchewan
5	44	Spencer Moore	TE	McMaster
6	49	Thomas Spoletini	LB	Calgary
7	56	Eric Armitage	OL	Western

== Preseason ==
Week	Date	Opponent	Score	Result	Attendance	Record
A	Fri, June 14	at Edmonton Eskimos	31–24	Win	26,623	1–0
B	Thurs, June 20	vs. Calgary Stampeders	24–23	Loss	32,003	1–1

# Games played with white uniforms.

== Regular season ==
=== Season standings ===
West Division
Team	GP	W	L	T	PF	PA	Pts	
Calgary Stampeders	18	14	4	0	549	413	28	Details
Saskatchewan Roughriders	18	11	7	0	519	398	22	Details
BC Lions	18	11	7	0	504	461	22	Details
Edmonton Eskimos	18	4	14	0	421	519	8	Details

=== Season schedule ===
Week	Date	Opponent	Score	Result	Attendance	Record
1	Sat, June 29	at Edmonton Eskimos	39–18	Win	35,869	1–0
2	Fri, July 5	vs. Calgary Stampeders	36–21	Win	35,296	2–0
3	Thurs, July 11	at Toronto Argonauts	39–28	Win	18,211	3–0
4	Sun, July 21	vs. Hamilton Tiger-Cats	37–0	Win	37,372	4–0
5	Sat, July 27	at Hamilton Tiger-Cats	32–20	Win	13,002	5–0
6	Bye					5–0
7	Fri, Aug 9	at Calgary Stampeders	42–27	Loss	35,367	5–1
8	Sat, Aug 17	vs. Montreal Alouettes	24–21	Win	40,637	6–1
9	Sat, Aug 24	at Edmonton Eskimos	30–27	Win	41,868	7–1
ǁ10ǁ	Sun, Sep 1	vs. Winnipeg Blue Bombers	48–25	Win	44,910	8–1
11	Sun, Sep 8	at Winnipeg Blue Bombers	25–13	Loss	33,500	8–2
12	Sat, Sep 14	vs. Toronto Argonauts	31–29	Loss	36,703	8–3
13	Sun, Sep 22	vs. BC Lions	24–22	Loss	39,373	8–4
14	Sun, Sep 29	at Montreal Alouettes	17–12	Loss	24,016	8–5
15	Fri, Oct 4	at BC Lions	31–17	Win	37,312	9–5
16	Sat, Oct 12	vs. Edmonton Eskimos	14–9	Win	35,579	10–5
17	Sat, Oct 19	vs. BC Lions	35–14	Win	34,956	11–5
18	Sat, Oct 26	at Calgary Stampeders	29–25	Loss	33,671	11–6
19	Sat, Nov 2	vs. Edmonton Eskimos	30–26	Loss	32,701	11–7

# Games played with primary home uniforms.
# Games played with white uniforms.
ǁ # ǁ Games played with retro alternate uniforms.

=== Game summaries ===
==== Week 1: at Edmonton Eskimos ====
Week One: Saskatchewan Roughriders at Edmonton Eskimos – Game summary

Quarter	1	2	3	4	Total
Roughriders	14	8	14	3	39
Eskimos	0	1	5	12	18

at Commonwealth Stadium, Edmonton, Alberta

- Date: June 29
- Game time: 1:30 p.m. CST
- Game attendance: 35,869
- Referee: Tom Vallesi
- TV announcers (TSN/ESPN2): Chris Cuthbert, Glen Suitor, and Darcy Seaton

Game information

Top passers

- SSK – Darian Durant (14-22, 171 yards, 3 TD, 0 INT)
- EDM – Mike Reilly (17-35, 259 yards, 1 TD, 3 INT)

Top rushers

- SSK – Kory Sheets (17 rushes, 131 yards, 1 TD)
- EDM – Mike Reilly (4 rushes, 37 yards, 0 TD)

Top receivers

- SSK – Chris Getzlaf (3 rec, 67 yards, 1 TD)
- EDM – Fred Stamps (6 rec, 125 yards, 1 TD)

Top tacklers

- SSK – Tie: Tyron Brackenridge, Craig Butler (5)
- EDM – J. C. Sherritt (6)

The Roughriders started their season in Edmonton, getting impressive performances from Darian Durant and Kory Sheets, in a dominating 39–18 win against the Eskimos. Durant completed 14 passes for 171 yards and three touchdowns, which was the third time in five games in his career that he passed for at least three touchdowns and no interceptions in the opening game of a season. Sheets had 17 rushes for a career best 131 yards and a touchdown while Renauld Williams gave the Riders a comfortable lead with an interception return for a touchdown on the last play of the first half to make the score 22–1 at the half. The game was the sixth time in the last seven seasons that the Roughriders won their opening game of the season. It was also the team's first win in Edmonton since September 26, 2009 and their first road victory against a west division opponent since July 10, 2010, ending a 14-game losing streak.

==== Week 2: vs Calgary Stampeders ====
Week Two: Calgary Stampeders at Saskatchewan Roughriders – Game summary

Quarter	1	2	3	4	Total
Stampeders	7	14	0	0	21
Roughriders	3	11	6	16	36

at Mosaic Stadium at Taylor Field, Regina, Saskatchewan

- Date: July 5
- Game time: 7:00 p.m. CST
- Game attendance: 35,296
- Referee: Glen Johnson
- TV announcers (TSN/RDS2/ESPN3): Rod Black, Glen Suitor, and Lee Jones

Game information

Top passers

- SSK – Darian Durant (26-34, 258 yards, 2 TD, 0 INT)
- CGY – Drew Tate (19-25, 231 yards, 2 TD, 0 INT)

Top rushers

- SSK – Kory Sheets (26 rushes, 133 yards, 1 TD)
- CGY – Jon Cornish (8 rushes, 42 yards, 0 TD)

Top receivers

- SSK – Weston Dressler (10 rec, 108 yards, 1 TD)
- CGY – Joe West (6 rec, 125 yards, 1 TD)

Top tacklers

- SSK – Prince Miller (6)
- CGY – Shawn Lemon (9)

In Week 2, the Roughriders found outstanding performances from receivers Chris Getzlaf, Weston Dressler and once again Durant and Sheets, in a 36–21 win over the Stampeders. Dressler had 10 catches for 108 yards and a touchdown while Getzlaf had eight receptions for 97 yards and a major of his own. Sheets set another career high with 133 rushing yards, and the Roughriders became the only team in the CFL to be undefeated, which is the first time since 2006 that there is only one undefeated team after two weeks. Saskatchewan dominated the time-of-possession, especially in the second half, where the Roughriders had the ball for close to 22 minutes compared to the Stampeders' eight, leading to a defensive shut out for Saskatchewan in the second half. With the temporary seating installed for the 101st Grey Cup, it was the largest opening day crowd and fourth largest overall in franchise history with 35,296 fans in the stands.

==== Week 3: at Toronto Argonauts ====
Week Three: Saskatchewan Roughriders at Toronto Argonauts – Game summary

Quarter	1	2	3	4	Total
Roughriders	7	14	8	10	39
Argonauts	11	3	0	14	28

at Rogers Centre, Toronto

- Date: July 11
- Game time: 5:30 p.m. CST
- Game attendance: 18,211
- Referee: Al Bradbury
- TV announcers (TSN/ESPN3): Chris Cuthbert, Duane Forde, and Matthew Scianitti

Game information

Top passers

- SSK – Darian Durant (14-19, 245 yards, 3 TD, 0 INT)
- TOR – Ricky Ray (27-37, 334 yards, 2 TD, 0 INT)

Top rushers

- SSK – Kory Sheets (26 rushes, 178 yards, 2 TD)
- TOR – Chad Kackert (9 rushes, 35 yards, 0 TD)

Top receivers

- SSK – Taj Smith (3 rec, 141 yards, 2 TD)
- TOR – Andre Durie (7 rec, 100 yards, 1 TD)

Top tacklers

- SSK – Renauld Williams (8)
- TOR – Robert McCune (7)

In Week 3, the Roughriders played defending Grey Cup champions Toronto Argonauts. Durant continued his outstanding start to the season as he completed 14 of 19 passes for 245 yards and three touchdowns before leaving early in the fourth quarter with an apparent ankle injury. He begins the season with eight touchdowns with no interceptions and a 72.0% completion rate. Kory Sheets recorded yet another career high with 178 rushing yards, which was his third 100-yard rushing game after recording three all of last year. Taj Smith had the first 100-yard receiving game of his career with three catches for 141 yards and two touchdowns. Rob Bagg recorded his first touchdown catch since September 25, 2010 following knee injuries that kept him out of most of the last two seasons. It was also Durant's 100th career touchdown pass. Remarkably, the Roughriders didn't record a turnover until the fourth quarter with 23 seconds left on a muffed onside kick return, which was the team's first turnover of the season. The Roughriders had a 3–0 record to start the season for the fourth time in the last six years.

==== Week 4: vs Hamilton Tiger-Cats ====
Week Four: Hamilton Tiger-Cats at Saskatchewan Roughriders – Game summary

Quarter	1	2	3	4	Total
Tiger-Cats	0	0	0	0	0
Roughriders	0	16	7	14	37

at Mosaic Stadium at Taylor Field, Regina, Saskatchewan

- Date: July 21
- Game time: 5:00 p.m. CST
- Game attendance: 37,372
- Referee: Andre Proulx
- TV announcers (TSN/ESPN3): Chris Cuthbert, Glen Suitor, and Lee Jones

Game information

Top passers

- SSK – Darian Durant (20-32, 347 yards, 4 TD, 0 INT)
- HAM – Henry Burris (16-27, 158 yards, 0 TD, 1 INT)

Top rushers

- SSK – Kory Sheets (24 rushes, 130 yards, 0 TD)
- HAM – Henry Burris (4 rushes, 10 yards, 0 TD)

Top receivers

- SSK – Rob Bagg (5 rec, 125 yards, 2 TD)
- HAM – Bakari Grant (6 rec, 80 yards, 0 TD)

Top tacklers

- SSK – Prince Miller (6)
- HAM – Rico Murray (7)

Former Roughriders quarterback and head coach Kent Austin, who led the Roughriders to the 1989 Grey Cup as a player and the 2007 Grey Cup as a head coach, returned to Mosaic Stadium as the head coach and general manager of the Hamilton Tiger-Cats for the first time since the 2007 Grey Cup victory. After sustaining a foot injury, Darian Durant was a game-time decision and excelled, passing for 347 yards and four touchdowns, which was the first time he passed for four touchdowns since a 2012 week one victory over the Tiger-Cats. Rob Bagg led all receivers with 125 receiving yards and two touchdowns, which was his first 100-yard and multi-touchdown performance since a 2010 game, once again against the Tiger-Cats. Offensive lineman Dan Clark scored his first touchdown on a pass from Durant and Kory Sheets recorded his fourth straight 100-yard rushing game, which was the best four-game start in CFL history with 572 rushing yards. The Roughriders recorded a 4–0 start to the season for only the fourth time in franchise history in the modern era of Canadian football.

==== Week 5: at Hamilton Tiger-Cats ====
Week Five: Saskatchewan Roughriders at Hamilton Tiger-Cats – Game summary

Quarter	1	2	3	4	Total
Roughriders	3	23	6	0	32
Tiger-Cats	10	7	0	3	20

at Alumni Stadium, Guelph, Ontario

- Date: July 27
- Game time: 5:30 p.m. CST
- Game attendance: 13,002
- Referee: Kim Murphy
- TV announcers (TSN/RDS2/ESPN3): Chris Cuthbert, Glen Suitor, and Claude Feig

Game information

Top passers

- SSK – Drew Willy (14-25, 269 yards, 3 TD, 0 INT)
- HAM – Henry Burris (26-41, 395 yards, 2 TD, 0 INT)

Top rushers

- SSK – Kory Sheets (25 rushes, 140 yards, 0 TD)
- HAM – C.J. Gable (4 rushes, 31 yards, 0 TD)

Top receivers

- SSK – Geroy Simon (5 rec, 125 yards, 1 TD)
- HAM – Greg Ellingson (5 rec, 114 yards, 1 TD)

Top tacklers

- SSK – Tie: Dwight Anderson, Eddie Russ, Woodny Turenne, Renauld Williams (4)
- HAM – Tie: Arthur Hobbs, Nate Bussey (6)

Leading up to their week 5 game against the Hamilton Tiger-Cats, there was again speculation that Durant may not play due to his foot injury sustained against the Argos. As a game-time decision, Drew Willy made his third professional start and first of the season as he completed 14 of 25 passes for 269 yards and three touchdowns en route to the Roughriders' fifth straight win to open the season. Kory Sheets rushed for 140 yards and became the first player in CFL history to rush for over 100 yards in each of the first five games to start the season. He also set a franchise record for consecutive 100-yard rushing games with five, surpassing the previous records held by George Reed (1969) and Mike Strickland (1978). Geroy Simon led all receivers with 125 receiving yards and scored his first touchdown as a Roughrider and the 101st touchdown reception of his career. John Chick recorded his first sack since returning to the Roughriders and Tearrius George had his first multi-sack game since 2007, matching his career high with three.

==== Week 7: at Calgary Stampeders ====
Week Seven: Saskatchewan Roughriders at Calgary Stampeders – Game summary

Quarter	1	2	3	4	Total
Roughriders	0	7	13	7	27
Stampeders	13	13	0	16	42

at McMahon Stadium, Calgary, Alberta

- Date: August 9
- Game time: 7:00 p.m. CST
- Game attendance: 35,637
- Referee: Tom Vallesi
- TV announcers (TSN/RDS2/ESPN3): Rod Black, Duane Forde, and Jermaine Franklin

Game information

Top passers

- SSK – Darian Durant (20-32, 278 yards, 3 TD, 0 INT)
- CGY – Kevin Glenn (21-28, 218 yards, 1 TD, 0 INT)

Top rushers

- SSK – Kory Sheets (14 rushes, 133 yards, 0 TD)
- CGY – Jon Cornish (16 rushes, 175 yards, 4 TD)

Top receivers

- SSK – Weston Dressler (4 rec, 68 yards, 0 TD)
- CGY – Nik Lewis (7 rec, 96 yards, 1 TD)

Top tacklers

- SSK – Dwight Anderson (9)
- CGY – Tie: Karl McCartney, Juwan Simpson, Fred Bennett, Jamar Wall (4)

The Roughriders suffered their first loss following the bye week to the Calgary Stampeders, leaving the season series split at one game apiece and setting up a rubber match in week 18. After not allowing more than 100 yards rushing in any game in the first five weeks, the Roughriders defense gave up 223 yards including 175 by Jon Cornish to go along with his four rushing touchdowns. While trailing by six points in the third quarter, kick returner Jock Sanders made the peculiar decision to return a kick from the one-yard line, resulting in a safety two plays later followed by a touchdown by Calgary on the ensuing drive, putting the game out of reach. Saskatchewan came into the game as the second-least penalized team, but committed a season-high 10 fouls for 126 yards. Individually, Kory Sheets had eight rushing yards in the first half, but finished strong with 133 total rushing yards by the end of the game, extending his 100-yard game streak to six. Sheets also committed the first offensive turnover of the year for the Roughriders after he fumbled in the first quarter. Darian Durant again had a strong game, passing for three touchdowns, increasing his league-leading total to 15, while having yet to record an interception.

==== Week 8: vs Montreal Alouettes ====
Week Eight: Montreal Alouettes at Saskatchewan Roughriders – Game summary

Quarter	1	2	3	4	Total
Alouettes	3	4	4	10	21
Roughriders	7	1	3	13	24

at Mosaic Stadium at Taylor Field, Regina, Saskatchewan

- Date: August 17
- Game time: 2:00 p.m. CST
- Game attendance: 40,637
- Referee: Al Bradbury
- TV announcers (TSN/RDS/ESPN3): Rod Black, Duane Forde, and Lee Jones

Game information

Top passers

- SSK – Darian Durant (18-32, 250 yards, 2 TD, 0 INT)
- MTL – Josh Neiswander (12-30, 147 yards, 0 TD, 2 INT)

Top rushers

- SSK – Kory Sheets (19 rushes, 74 yards, 0 TD)
- MTL – Jerome Messam (15 rushes, 54 yards, 0 TD)

Top receivers

- SSK – Chris Getzlaf (5 rec, 95 yards, 0 TD)
- MTL – S. J. Green (7 rec, 146 yards, 1 TD)

Top tacklers

- SSK – Weldon Brown (8)
- MTL – Chip Cox (11)

With a sellout 40,637 in attendance at Mosaic Stadium at Taylor Field, the Saskatchewan Roughriders tried to get back on track after suffering their first loss of the 2013 season to Calgary. In the first quarter, Darian Durant found Weston Dressler for a touchdown and later would eclipse the 20,000 passing yards mark for his CFL career. Early in the second quarter, Ricky Foley would injure Alouettes quarterback Anthony Calvillo, forcing Calvillo sit out the rest of the game. Riders returner Jock Sanders suffered two fumbles in the game, making Dressler and Weldon Brown take over for punt and kickoff returns respectively. Rob Bagg would exit the game after an apparent lower body injury. Longtime CFL receiver Geroy Simon caught his 1,000th career reception, becoming only the third CFL player to do so. With the score tied 14-14, Alouettes' defensive back Jerald Brown recovered a fumble by Durant and returned it for a touchdown late in the 4th quarter, but Durant responded with a 65-yard touchdown toss to Taj Smith, tying the game again. Following a Montreal two-and-out, Dressler returned the ensuing punt 38 yards, setting up Christopher Milo's 36-yard game-winning field goal. This was the first game of the season in which Kory Sheets did not rush for over 100 yards.

==== Week 9: at Edmonton Eskimos ====
Week Nine: Saskatchewan Roughriders at Edmonton Eskimos – Game summary

Quarter	1	2	3	4	Total
Roughriders	3	9	10	8	30
Eskimos	3	7	14	3	27

at Commonwealth Stadium, Edmonton, Alberta

- Date: August 24
- Game time: 2:00 p.m. CST
- Game attendance: 41,868
- Referee: Murray Clarke
- TV announcers (TSN/ESPN3): Rod Black, Glen Suitor, and Darcy Seaton

Game information

Top passers

- SSK – Darian Durant (24-30, 334 yards, 0 TD, 0 INT)
- EDM – Mike Reilly (19-29, 303 yards, 3 TD, 2 INT)

Top rushers

- SSK – Kory Sheets (24 rushes, 139 yards, 2 TD)
- EDM – Mike Reilly (8 rushes, 76 yards, 0 TD)

Top receivers

- SSK – Chris Getzlaf (5 rec, 90 yards, 0 TD)
- EDM – Fred Stamps (8 rec, 111 yards, 2 TD)

Top tacklers

- SSK – Renauld Williams (8)
- EDM – Rennie Curran (8)

Following below average performances by Darian Durant and Kory Sheets in week 8, both players got back on track against the Edmonton Eskimos to lead their team to victory. Durant completed 80% of his passes for 334 yards, which is the highest completion percentage in a start during his CFL career. While he didn't throw an interception for the seventh straight start, he also didn't throw a touchdown pass, which was the first time he had not thrown at least two touchdown passes during this streak. This was probably due to Sheets scoring both of Saskatchewan's touchdowns on rushes, where he ran for 139 yards en route to becoming the fastest player to reach 1,000 yards rushing to start a season, doing so in the first eight games. Geroy Simon passed 16,000 yards receiving in his career and Christopher Milo connected on all five of his field goal attempts to keep him perfect on the season. The game saw seven lead changes, but the defense made big plays in the fourth quarter. Dwight Anderson recorded his second interception of the season with Edmonton on the Saskatchewan 4-yard line and trailing only by two points. After a Ricky Schmitt single on the ensuing drive to give the Roughriders a three-point lead, Weldon Brown forced Edmonton quarterback Mike Reilly to fumble on the next Eskimo drive to seal the Saskatchewan victory. The Roughriders have a 7–1 record for only the second time in franchise history, with the first being in 1970 when that team finished 14–2.

==== Week 10: vs Winnipeg Blue Bombers ====
Week Ten: Winnipeg Blue Bombers at Saskatchewan Roughriders – Game summary

Quarter	1	2	3	4	Total
Blue Bombers	2	16	0	7	25
Roughriders	7	7	10	24	48

at Mosaic Stadium at Taylor Field, Regina, Saskatchewan

- Date: September 1
- Game time: 2:00 p.m. CST
- Game attendance: 44,910
- Referee: Kim Murphy
- TV announcers (TSN/ESPN3): Rod Black, Duane Forde

Game information

Top passers

- SSK – Darian Durant (24-35, 315 yards, 4 TD, 1 INT)
- WPG – Justin Goltz (18-29, 182 yards, 0 TD, 2 INT)

Top rushers

- SSK – Kory Sheets (20 rushes, 91 yards, 2 TD)
- WPG – Justin Goltz (5 rushes, 73 yards, 2 TD)

Top receivers

- SSK – Chris Getzlaf (7 rec, 112 yards, 0 TD)
- WPG – Cory Watson (3 rec, 74 yards, 0 TD)

Top tacklers

- SSK – Macho Harris (5)
- WPG – Henoc Muamba (9)

The Roughriders hosted the second largest crowd in franchise history with a sellout crowd of 44,910 fans at Mosaic Stadium to witness a 48–25 win over their arch-rival Winnipeg Blue Bombers. After being down by four points at half-time, the Roughriders outscored the Blue Bombers 34-7 en route to their ninth straight Labour Day Classic victory. Darian Durant threw his first interception of the season to Winnipeg's Henoc Muamba, but responded by throwing four touchdown passes thereafter to go along with his third 300-yard game of 2013. Kory Sheets missed the 100-yard rushing mark for just the second time of the season, but recorded the best nine game start in CFL history with 1,149 rushing yards. On defense, Dwight Anderson recorded an interception for the third consecutive game and John Chick had his first multi-sack game since the 2009 Labour Day Classic. The win improved the Riders' record to 8-1 which is the best nine-game start in franchise history.

==== Week 11: at Winnipeg Blue Bombers ====
Week Eleven: Saskatchewan Roughriders at Winnipeg Blue Bombers – Game summary

Quarter	1	2	3	4	Total
Roughriders	3	9	1	0	13
Blue Bombers	7	3	7	8	25

at Investors Group Field, Winnipeg, Manitoba

- Date: September 8
- Game time: 2:00 p.m. CST
- Game attendance: 33,510
- Referee: Al Bradbury
- TV announcers (TSN/ESPN3): Chris Cuthbert and Glen Suitor

Game information

Top passers

- SSK – Darian Durant (15-33, 129 yards, 0 TD, 1 INT)
- WPG – Justin Goltz (8-17, 129 yards, 0 TD, 1 INT)

Top rushers

- SSK – Kory Sheets (14 rushes, 65 yards, 0 TD)
- WPG – Justin Goltz (6 rushes, 56 yards, 2 TD)

Top receivers

- SSK – Kory Sheets (6 rec, 57 yards, 0 TD)
- WPG – Aaron Kelly (3 rec, 78 yards, 0 TD)

Top tacklers

- SSK – Tie: Weldon Brown, Macho Harris (4)
- WPG – Demond Washington (7)

==== Week 12: vs Toronto Argonauts ====
Week Twelve: Toronto Argonauts at Saskatchewan Roughriders – Game summary

Quarter	1	2	3	4	Total
Argonauts	11	1	0	19	31
Roughriders	3	17	3	6	29

at Mosaic Stadium at Taylor Field, Regina, Saskatchewan

- Date: September 14
- Game time: 7:30 p.m. CST
- Game attendance: 36,703
- Referee: Andre Proulx
- TV announcers (TSN/ESPN3): Gord Miller and Matt Dunigan

Game information

Top passers

- SSK – Darian Durant (24-49, 369 yards, 3 TD, 3 INT)
- TOR – Zach Collaros (18-29, 225 yards, 1 TD, 1 INT)

Top rushers

- SSK – Neal Hughes (6 rushes, 14 yards, 0 TD)
- TOR – Jerious Norwood (12 rushes, 73 yards, 1 TD)

Top receivers

- SSK – Chris Getzlaf (5 rec, 133 yards, 2 TD)
- TOR – John Chiles (8 rec, 104 yards, 1 TD)

Top tacklers

- SSK – Carlos Thomas (5)
- TOR – Marcus Ball (6)

==== Week 13: vs BC Lions ====
Week Thirteen: BC Lions at Saskatchewan Roughriders – Game summary

Quarter	1	2	3	4	Total
Lions	3	3	15	3	24
Roughriders	0	9	3	10	22

at Mosaic Stadium at Taylor Field, Regina, Saskatchewan

- Date: September 22
- Game time: 2:30 p.m. CST
- Game attendance: 39,373
- TV announcers (TSN/ESPN3): Chris Cuthbert and Glen Suitor

Game information

Top passers

- SSK – Darian Durant (35-52, 326 yards, 2 TD, 0 INT)
- BC – Thomas DeMarco (18-33, 208 yards, 2 TD, 0 INT)

Top rushers

- SSK – Chris Garrett (9 rushes, 30 yards, 0 TD)
- BC – Andrew Harris (7 rushes, 27 yards, 0 TD)

Top receivers

- SSK – Taj Smith (10 rec, 104 yards, 0 TD)
- BC – Shawn Gore (6 rec, 74 yards, 1 TD)

Top tacklers

- SSK – Craig Butler (6)
- BC – Dante Marsh (13)

==== Week 14: at Montreal Alouettes ====
Week Fourteen: Saskatchewan Roughriders at Montreal Alouettes – Game summary

Quarter	1	2	3	4	Total
Roughriders	1	2	1	8	12
Alouettes	1	3	7	6	17

at Molson Stadium, Montreal, Quebec

- Date: September 29
- Game time: 11:00 a.m. CST
- Game attendance: 24,016
- Referee: Al Bradbury
- TV announcers (TSN/RDS/ESPN3): Chris Cuthbert and Glen Suitor

Game information

Top passers

- SSK – Darian Durant (24-46, 339 yards, 1 TD, 3 INT)
- MTL – Josh Neiswander (21-36, 264 yards, 1 TD, 0 INT)

Top rushers

- SSK – Chris Garrett (5 rushes, 9 yards, 0 TD)
- MTL – Jerome Messam (12 rushes, 43 yards, 0 TD)

Top receivers

- SSK – Chris Getzlaf (6 rec, 124 yards, 0 TD)
- MTL – Duron Carter (6 rec, 152 yards, 1 TD)

Top tacklers

- SSK – Mike McCullough (6)
- MTL – Tie: Chip Cox, Jerald Brown (5)

==== Week 15: at BC Lions ====
Week Fifteen: Saskatchewan Roughriders at BC Lions – Game summary

Quarter	1	2	3	4	Total
Roughriders	0	16	9	6	31
Lions	3	0	7	7	17

at BC Place Stadium, Vancouver, British Columbia

- Date: October 4
- Game time: 8:00 p.m. CST
- Game attendance: 37,312
- TV announcers (TSN/RDS2/ESPN3): Chris Cuthbert, Glen Suitor, and Farhan Lalji

Game information

Top passers

- SSK – Darian Durant (21-31, 234 yards, 1 TD, 0 INT)
- BC – Thomas DeMarco (19-36, 286 yards, 1 TD, 3 INT)

Top rushers

- SSK – Kory Sheets (14 rushes, 80 yards, 2 TD)
- BC – Korey Williams (1 rushes, 41 yards, 0 TD)

Top receivers

- SSK – Weston Dressler (5 rec, 73 yards, 1 TD)
- BC – Nick Moore (5 rec, 92 yards, 1 TD)

Top tacklers

- SSK – Tie: Renauld Williams, Ricky Foley (6)
- BC – Adam Bighill (5)

==== Week 16: vs Edmonton Eskimos ====
Week Sixteen: Edmonton Eskimos at Saskatchewan Roughriders – Game summary

Quarter	1	2	3	4	Total
Eskimos	3	0	6	0	9
Roughriders	0	14	0	0	14

at Mosaic Stadium at Taylor Field, Regina, Saskatchewan

- Date: October 12
- Game time: 2:30 p.m. CST
- Game attendance: 35,579
- TV announcers (TSN/ESPN3): Rod Black and Duane Forde

Game information

Top passers

- SSK – Darian Durant (16-24, 170 yards, 1 TD, 2 INT)
- EDM – Mike Reilly (17-34, 244 yards, 0 TD, 2 INT)

Top rushers

- SSK – Kory Sheets (24 rushes, 106 yards, 1 TD)
- EDM – Mike Reilly (9 rushes, 42 yards, 0 TD)

Top receivers

- SSK – Chris Getzlaf (4 rec, 51 yards, 0 TD)
- EDM – Matt Carter (2 rec, 71 yards, 0 TD)

Top tacklers

- SSK – Dwight Anderson (6)
- EDM – Rennie Curran (11)

==== Week 17: vs BC Lions ====
Week Seventeen: BC Lions at Saskatchewan Roughriders – Game summary

Quarter	1	2	3	4	Total
Lions	7	0	7	0	14
Roughriders	10	21	0	4	35

at Mosaic Stadium at Taylor Field, Regina, Saskatchewan

- Date: October 19
- Game time: 2:30 p.m. CST
- Game attendance: 34,956
- TV announcers (TSN/ESPN3): Gord Miller and Matt Dunigan

Game information

Top passers

- SSK – Darian Durant (13-29, 187 yards, 1 TD, 1 INT)
- BC – Thomas DeMarco (13-30, 147 yards, 2 TD, 4 INT)

Top rushers

- SSK – Kory Sheets (25 rushes, 148 yards, 1 TD)
- BC – Stefan Logan (11 rushes, 51 yards, 0 TD)

Top receivers

- SSK – Weston Dressler (3 rec, 107 yards, 1 TD)
- BC – Nick Moore (5 rec, 73 yards, 1 TD)

Top tacklers

- SSK – Carlos Thomas (4)
- BC – Solomon Elimimian (7)

==== Week 18: at Calgary Stampeders ====
Week Eighteen: Saskatchewan Roughriders at Calgary Stampeders – Game summary

Quarter	1	2	3	4	Total
Roughriders	3	12	3	7	25
Stampeders	3	7	9	10	29

at McMahon Stadium, Calgary, Alberta

- Date: October 26
- Game time: 5:00 p.m. CST
- Game attendance: 33,671
- TV announcers (TSN/ESPN3): Chris Cuthbert and Glen Suitor

Game information

Top passers

- SSK – Darian Durant (17-31, 202 yards, 1 TD, 1 INT)
- CGY – Drew Tate (11-16, 181 yards, 0 TD, 0 INT)

Top rushers

- SSK – Kory Sheets (11 rushes, 42 yards, 0 TD)
- CGY – Jon Cornish (20 rushes, 109 yards, 1 TD)

Top receivers

- SSK – Taj Smith (3 rec, 53 yards, 1 TD)
- CGY – Jeff Fuller (6 rec, 113 yards, 0 TD)

Top tacklers

- SSK – Tyron Brackenridge (6)
- CGY – Juwan Simpson (6)

==== Week 19: vs Edmonton Eskimos ====
Week Nineteen: Edmonton Eskimos at Saskatchewan Roughriders – Game summary

Quarter	1	2	3	4	Total
Eskimos	10	3	10	7	30
Roughriders	3	7	10	6	26

at Mosaic Stadium at Taylor Field, Regina, Saskatchewan

- Date: November 2
- Game time: 3:00 p.m. CST
- Game attendance: 32,701
- TV announcers (TSN/RDS2/ESPN3): Chris Cuthbert and Glen Suitor

Game information

Top passers

- SSK – Tino Sunseri (14-18, 167 yards, 0 TD, 0 INT)
- EDM – Mike Reilly (5-12, 50 yards, 0 TD, 0 INT)

Top rushers

- SSK – Chris Garrett (23 rushes, 152 yards, 1 TD)
- EDM – Mike Reilly (7 rushes, 60 yards, 0 TD)

Top receivers

- SSK – Taj Smith (9 rec, 106 yards, 0 TD)
- EDM – Adarius Bowman (2 rec, 36 yards, 0 TD)

Top tacklers

- SSK – Tie: Dwight Anderson, Mike McCullough (4)
- EDM – Rennie Curran (11)

== Roster ==
2013 Saskatchewan Roughriders final roster
Quarterbacks: 4 Darian Durant; 8 Tino Sunseri; 5 Drew Willy; Running backs: 32 Neal Hughes; 2 Jock Sanders; 1 Kory Sheets; 30 Daryl Stephenson; Receivers: 6 Rob Bagg; 7 Weston Dressler; 89 Chris Getzlaf; 18 Scott McHenry; 81 Geroy Simon; 88 Taj Smith	Offensive linemen: 66 Chris Best G/C; 67 Dan Clark G; 58 Xavier Fulton T; 65 Ben Heenan T/G; 57 Brendon LaBatte G; 68 Dominic Picard C; Defensive linemen: 97 John Chick DE; 92 Zack Evans DT; 95 Ricky Foley DE/DT; 99 Alex Hall DE; 98 Jermaine McElveen DT; 74 Keith Shologan DT	Linebackers: 51 Tristan Black; 29 Tyron Brackenridge; 22 Diamond Ferri; 27 Brian Peters; 45 Mike McCullough; 48 Renauld Williams; Defensive backs: 33 Dwight Anderson; 35 Weldon Brown; 28 Craig Butler; 38 Tristan Jackson; 20 Terrell Maze; 42 Graig Newman; 11 Carlos Thomas; 37 Rod Williams; 21 Paul Woldu	Special teams: 47 Cory Huclack LS; 19 Chris Milo K; 17 Ricky Schmitt P/K; 75 Levi Steinhauer LS; Reserve roster: 63 Devin Tyler T; 69 Corey Watman C; Practice roster: 83 Alex Anthony SB; 61 Brendan Dunn T; 47 Mortty Ivy LB; 16 Eddie Russ DB; 96 Richard Sumlin DT	Injured list: 26 Graeme Bell FB; 9 Matt Brown RB; 90 Antonio Coleman DE; 15 Milt Collins DB; 25 Chris Garrett RB; 93 Tearrius George DT; 87 Aaron Hargreaves SB; 3 Macho Harris DB; 31 Sam Hurl LB; 10 Kierrie Johnson SB; 52 Abraham Kromah LB; 0 Ejiro Kuale LB; 64 James Lee T; 14 Prince Miller DB; 80 Spencer Moore FB; 43 Kevin Régimbald-Gagné LB; 85 Eron Riley WR; 12 Jordan Sisco WR; 59 Hilee Taylor DE; 24 Woodny Turenne DB; Italics indicate International player Roster updated 2026-05-10; Depth Chart • Transactions

== Coaching staff ==
2013 Saskatchewan Roughriders staff
Front office: President and ceo – Jim Hopson; General manager – Brendan Taman; Assistant general manager – Jeremy O'Day; Director of player personnel – Craig Smith; Director of U.S. Scouting – Vacant; Head coaches: Head coach – Corey Chamblin; Offensive coaches: Offensive coordinator – George Cortez; Offensive line – Doug Malone; Quarterbacks – Khari Jones; Receivers – Jason Tucker	Defensive coaches: Defensive coordinator/linebackers – Richie Hall; Defensive line – Todd Howard; Defensive backs – Barron Miles; Defensive backs – Richard Kent; Special teams coaches: Special teams coordinator – Bob Dyce; Special Teams Coach - Cory McDiarmid; Strength and conditioning: Strength and conditioning coordinator – Dan Farthing; → Coaching staff

== Playoffs ==
=== Schedule ===
Week	Game	Date	Time	Opponent	Score	Result	Attendance
20	ǁ West Semi-Final ǁ	Sun, Nov 10	3:30 PM CST	vs. BC Lions	29–25	Win	30,942
21	West Final	Sun, Nov 17	3:30 PM CST	at Calgary Stampeders	35–13	Win	33,174
22	101st Grey Cup	Sun, Nov 24	5:00 PM CST	Hamilton Tiger-Cats	45–23	Win	44,710

# Games played with primary home uniforms.
# Games played with white uniforms.
ǁ # ǁ Games played with retro alternate uniforms.

=== Game summaries ===
==== West Semi-Final: vs BC Lions ====
West Semi-Final: BC Lions at Saskatchewan Roughriders – Game summary

Quarter	1	2	3	4	Total
Lions	0	17	8	0	25
Roughriders	3	13	0	13	29

at Mosaic Stadium at Taylor Field, Regina, Saskatchewan

- Date: November 10
- Game time: 3:30 p.m. CST
- Game weather: Clear; −11 °C; wind 19 km/h
- Game attendance: 30,942
- Referee: Andre Proulx
- TV announcers (TSN/RDS/ESPN3): Rod Black (Play by Play), Duane Forde (Colour), Farhan Lalji (Sideline)
- Recap, Stats

Game information

Top passers

- SSK – Darian Durant (19-23, 270 yards, 2 TD, 0 INT)
- BC – Travis Lulay (20-26, 211 yards, 0 TD, 0 INT)

Top rushers

- SSK – Darian Durant (6 rushes, 97 yards, 0 TD)
- BC – Andrew Harris (10 rushes, 93 yards, 0 TD)

Top receivers

- SSK – Taj Smith (4 rec, 126 yards, 0 TD)
- BC – Emmanuel Arceneaux (5 rec, 53 yards, 0 TD)

Top tacklers

- SSK – Tyron Brackenridge (6)
- BC – Tie: Adam Bighill, Korey Banks (6)

==== West Final: at Calgary Stampeders ====
West Final: Saskatchewan Roughriders at Calgary Stampeders – Game summary

Quarter	1	2	3	4	Total
Roughriders	7	15	0	13	35
Stampeders	6	0	7	0	13

at McMahon Stadium, Calgary, Alberta

- Date: November 17
- Game time: 3:30 p.m. CST
- Game weather: Clear; −11 °C; wind 20 km/h
- Game attendance: 33,174
- Referee: Kim Murphy
- TV announcers (TSN/RDS/NBCSN): Chris Cuthbert (Play by Play), Glen Suitor (Colour), Jermaine Franklin (Sideline), Farhan Lalji (Sideline)
- Recap, Stats

Game information

Top passers

- SSK – Darian Durant (24-30, 280 yards, 3 TD, 0 INT)
- CGY – Drew Tate (7-13, 185 yards, 0 TD, 2 INT)

Top rushers

- SSK – Kory Sheets (28 rushes, 177 yards, 1 TD)
- CGY – Jon Cornish (9 rushes, 67 yards, 0 TD)

Top receivers

- SSK – Weston Dressler (5 rec, 116 yards, 1 TD)
- CGY – Joe West (3 rec, 101 yards, 1 TD)

Top tacklers

- SSK – Jermaine McElveen (5)
- CGY – Deron Mayo (14)

==== Grey Cup: vs Hamilton Tiger-Cats ====
Grey Cup: Hamilton Tiger-Cats at Saskatchewan Roughriders – Game summary

Quarter	1	2	3	4	Total
Tiger-Cats	3	3	7	10	23
Roughriders	7	24	0	14	45

at Mosaic Stadium at Taylor Field, Regina, Saskatchewan

- Date: November 24
- Game time: 5:00 p.m. CST
- Game weather: Clear; 2°C; wind 45-65 km/h
- Game attendance: 44,710
- Referee: Kim Murphy
- TV announcers (TSN/RDS/NBCSN): Chris Cuthbert (Play by Play), Glen Suitor (Colour), Sara Orlesky (Sideline), Farhan Lalji (Sideline)
- Recap, Stats

Game information

First quarter

- HAM – FG Congi 45 (9:44) 0 – 3 HAM
- SSK – TD Simon 15 yd pass from Durant (Milo convert) (6:59) 7 – 3 SSK

Second quarter

- SSK – FG Milo 20 (12:46) 10 – 3 SSK
- SSK – TD Sanders 3 yd running (Milo convert) (9:00) 17 – 3 SSK
- SSK – TD Sheets 1 yd running (Milo convert) (5:31) 24 – 3 SSK
- HAM – FG Congi 24 (2:47) 24 – 6 SSK
- SSK - TD Simon 42 yd pass from Durant (Milo convert) (1:56) 31 - 6 SSK

Third quarter

- HAM – TD Burris 18 yd running (Congi convert) (2:52) 31 – 13 SSK

Fourth quarter

- HAM – FG Congi 33 (14:48) 31 – 16 SSK
- SSK – TD Sheets 4 yd running (Milo convert) (5:23) 38 – 16 SSK
- SSK – TD Dressler 26 yd pass from Durant (Milo convert) (4:09) 45 – 16 SSK
- HAM – TD Gable 2 yd running (Congi convert) (1:56) 45 – 23 SSK

Top passers

- SSK – Darian Durant (17-24, 245 yards, 3 TD, 0 INT)
- HAM – Henry Burris (20-43, 272 yards, 0 TD, 1 INT)

Top rushers

- SSK – Kory Sheets (20 rushes, 197 yards, 2 TD)
- HAM – Henry Burris (2 rushes, 34 yards, 1 TD)

Top receivers

- SSK – Weston Dressler (5 rec, 81 yards, 1 TD)
- HAM – Bakari Grant (7 rec, 76 yards, 0 TD)

Top tacklers

- SSK – Weldon Brown (5)
- HAM – Tie: Brandon Boudreaux, Neil King, Rico Murray (6)
