= 2014 Saskatchewan Roughriders season =

CFL team season

- General manager: Brendan Taman
- Head coach: Corey Chamblin
- Home stadium: Mosaic Stadium at Taylor Field

Results
- Record: 10–8
- Division place: 3rd, West
- Playoffs: Lost West Semi-Final
- Team MOP: John Chick
- Team MOC: Ricky Foley
- Team MOR: Mark LeGree

Uniform

The 2014 Saskatchewan Roughriders season was the 57th season for the team in the Canadian Football League (CFL). The Roughriders qualified for the playoffs for a third straight season, but failed to defend their Grey Cup title as they lost the West Semi-Final to the Edmonton Eskimos. For the second consecutive season, the club held training camp at Griffiths Stadium in Saskatoon with the main camp beginning on June 1.

== Offseason ==
=== Transactions ===
During the offseason, the Roughriders lost many key players from the 2013 season, including Weston Dressler, Kory Sheets, Craig Butler and Ricky Schmitt.

The Roughriders lost quarterbacks coach Khari Jones to the BC Lions, who went there to become the Lions' offensive coordinator. During the 2013 CFL Expansion Draft, they lost Keith Shologan, Zack Evans and James Lee to the Ottawa Redblacks. The Roughriders re-signed Terrell Maze, Taj Smith, Christopher Milo, Paul Woldu and Macho Harris who all were slated to become free agents in February 2014. In a trade with the Winnipeg Blue Bombers, the Roughriders traded Drew Willy for Jade Etienne. In a trade with the Hamilton Tiger-Cats, the Roughriders received Josh Bartel and Shomari Williams.

In free agency, the Roughriders lost Craig Butler, Jermaine McElveen, Ricky Schmitt, Jock Sanders, Graig Newman and Abraham Kromah. The Roughriders signed David Lee.

The Roughriders lost two players to the National Football League, with Weston Dressler being signed by the Kansas City Chiefs and Kory Sheets being signed by the Oakland Raiders. Dressler returned to the Roughriders in August 2014.

=== CFL draft ===
The 2014 CFL draft took place on May 13, 2014. The Roughriders had eight selections total in the seven-round draft, after trading down in the draft twice to accumulate more lower-round selections.

Round	Pick	Player	Position	School/club team
2	11	Dylan Ainsworth	DL	Western
2	18	Alex Pierzchalski	WR	Toronto
3	20	Johnny Mark	K	Calgary
3	26	Kristopher Bastien	WR	Concordia
5	39	Matt Webster	DB	Queen's
5	45	Kyle Paterson	OL	Regina
6	49	Travis Bent	LB	Concordia
7	56	Terry Hart	OL	St. Francis Xavier

== Preseason ==
On February 10, 2014, it was announced that the Ottawa Redblacks will play their "home" pre-season game at Mosaic Stadium at Taylor Field against the Roughriders on June 14, 2014. Ottawa will be on the home side of the field and the team will be introduced as the home team, while Saskatchewan will play the game as their "away" pre-season game. This was done to accommodate for any delays that may be incurred due to the construction of TD Place Stadium.

Week	Date	Kickoff	Opponent	Results		TV	Venue	Attendance	Summary
Week	Date	Kickoff	Opponent	Score	Record	TV	Venue	Attendance	Summary
A	Bye								
B	Sat, June 14	4:00 p.m. CST	at Ottawa Redblacks	W 21–17	1–0	TSN2	Mosaic Stadium	13,014	Recap
C	Fri, June 20	7:00 p.m. CST	vs. Edmonton Eskimos	L 14–19	1–1	None	Mosaic Stadium	15,353	Recap

# Games played with primary home uniforms.

== Regular season ==
=== Season standings ===
West Division
Team	GP	W	L	T	PF	PA	Pts	
Calgary Stampeders	18	15	3	0	511	347	30	Details
Edmonton Eskimos	18	12	6	0	492	340	24	Details
Saskatchewan Roughriders	18	10	8	0	399	441	20	Details
BC Lions	18	9	9	0	380	365	18	Details
Winnipeg Blue Bombers	18	7	11	0	397	481	14	Details

=== Schedule ===
Week	Date	Kickoff	Opponent	Results		TV	Venue	Attendance	Summary
Week	Date	Kickoff	Opponent	Score	Record	TV	Venue	Attendance	Summary
1	Sun, June 29	5:00 p.m. CST	vs. Hamilton Tiger-Cats	W 31–10	1–0	TSN/RDS2	Mosaic Stadium	19,285	Recap
2	Sat, July 5	1:00 p.m. CST	at Toronto Argonauts	L 15–48	1–1	TSN/RDS2/ESPN2	Rogers Centre	17,758	Recap
3	Sat, July 12	7:30 p.m. CST	vs. BC Lions	L 13–26	1–2	TSN/RDS2	Mosaic Stadium	32,864	Recap
4	Bye								
5	Sat, July 26	8:00 p.m. CST	vs. Toronto Argonauts	W 37–9	2–2	TSN/ESPN2	Mosaic Stadium	32,621	Recap
6	Sat, Aug 2	5:00 p.m. CST	at Ottawa Redblacks	W 38–14	3–2	TSN/RDS2	TD Place Stadium	24,303	Recap
7	Thur, Aug 7	6:30 p.m. CST	at Winnipeg Blue Bombers	W 23–17	4–2	TSN	Investors Group Field	33,234	Recap
8	Sat, Aug 16	5:00 p.m. CST	vs. Montreal Alouettes	W 16–11	5–2	TSN/RDS	Mosaic Stadium	33,427	Recap
9	Sun, Aug 24	5:00 p.m. CST	at BC Lions	W 20–16	6–2	TSN/RDS2	BC Place	33,196	Recap
ǁ10ǁ	Sun, Aug 31	2:00 p.m. CST	vs. Winnipeg Blue Bombers	W 35–30	7–2	TSN	Mosaic Stadium	33,427	Recap
11	Sun, Sept 7	2:00 p.m. CST	at Winnipeg Blue Bombers	W 30–24	8–2	TSN/ESPN	Investors Group Field	33,234	Recap
12	Sun, Sept 14	11:00 a.m. CST	at Hamilton Tiger-Cats	L 3–28	8–3	TSN	Tim Hortons Field	18,135	Recap
13	Sun, Sept 21	2:00 p.m. CST	vs. Ottawa Redblacks	W 35–32 (2OT)	9–3	TSN/RDS2	Mosaic Stadium	33,427	Recap
14	Fri, Sept 26	8:00 p.m. CST	at Edmonton Eskimos	L 0–24	9–4	TSN	Commonwealth Stadium	42,161	Recap
15	Fri, Oct 3	8:00 p.m. CST	vs. Calgary Stampeders	L 24–31	9–5	TSN/ESPN2	Mosaic Stadium	33,031	Recap
16	Mon, Oct 13	11:00 a.m. CST	at Montreal Alouettes	L 9–40	9–6	TSN/RDS	Molson Stadium	23,069	Recap
17	Sun, Oct 19	2:00 p.m. CST	vs. Edmonton Eskimos	L 19–24	9–7	TSN/ESPN2	Mosaic Stadium	32,421	Recap
18	Fri, Oct 24	7:30 p.m. CST	at Calgary Stampeders	L 27–40	9–8	TSN	McMahon Stadium	35,400	Recap
19	Bye								
20	Sat, Nov 8	6:00 p.m. CST	vs. Edmonton Eskimos	W 24-17	10-8	TSN/RDS2	Mosaic Stadium	20,139	Recap

# Games played with primary home uniforms.
# Games played with white uniforms.
ǁ # ǁ Games played with retro alternate uniforms.
# Games played with signature series uniforms.

== Post-season ==
=== Schedule ===
Game	Date	Kickoff	Opponent	Results		TV	Venue	Attendance	Summary
Game	Date	Kickoff	Opponent	Score	Record	TV	Venue	Attendance	Summary
West Semi-Final	Sun, Nov 16	3:30 p.m. CST	at Edmonton Eskimos	L 10-18	0-1	TSN/RDS2/ESPN2	Commonwealth Stadium	26,237	Recap

# Games played with white uniforms.

== Roster ==
2014 Saskatchewan Roughriders final roster
Quarterbacks: 9 Seth Doege; 5 Kerry Joseph; 12 Tino Sunseri; Running backs: 26 Anthony Allen; 39 Tim Cronk; 10 Steven Miller; 80 Spencer Moore; Receivers: 83 Alex Anthony; 6 Rob Bagg; 82 Dan DePalma; 7 Weston Dressler; 89 Chris Getzlaf; 16 Brett Swain; 8 Korey Williams	Offensive linemen: 66 Chris Best G; 58 Xavier Fulton T; 65 Ben Heenan T; 57 Brendon LaBatte G; 68 Dominic Picard C; 69 Corey Watman C/G; Defensive linemen: 90 Dylan Ainsworth DE; 97 John Chick DE; 95 Ricky Foley DE; 93 Tearrius George DT; 92 Trevor Guyton DT; 91 David Lee DE; 70 Derek Walker DT	Linebackers: 41 Tyron Brackenridge; 45 Marvin Burdette; 22 Diamond Ferri; 31 Sam Hurl; 27 Brian Peters; 99 Shomari Williams; Defensive backs: 3 Macho Harris; 38 Tristan Jackson; 28 Mark LeGree; 20 Terrell Maze; 24 Woodny Turenne; 25 Matt Webster; 37 Rod Williams; 21 Paul Woldu	Special teams: 17 Josh Bartel P/K; 19 Chris Milo K/P; 61 Chad Rempel LS; Reserve roster: 35 Weldon Brown DB; 33 Jerome Messam RB; Practice roster: 84 Kris Bastien SB; 61 Pierce Burton G/T; 11 Keith Price QB; 14 Quinn Sharp K/P; 24 Ryan Steed DB; 53 Matt Vonk G; 52 Ryan Wellman LB; 98 Markus White DE	Injured list: 64 Levy Adcock T; 94 Chancey Aghayere DT; 51 Tristan Black LB; 96 Brandon Boudreaux DE; 77 Dan Clark G; 4 Darian Durant QB; 1 Marshay Green DB; 32 Neal Hughes FB; 50 Chad Kilgore LB; 18 Scott McHenry SB; 85 Alex Pierzchalski WR; 43 Kevin Régimbald-Gagné LB; 81 Chaz Schilens WR; 2 Ryan Smith SB; 88 Taj Smith WR; 62 Levi Steinhauer LS; 59 Hilee Taylor DE; 11 Carlos Thomas DB; Italics indicate International player
