= 2012 Saskatchewan Roughriders season =

CFL team season

- General manager: Brendan Taman
- Head coach: Corey Chamblin
- Home stadium: Mosaic Stadium at Taylor Field

Results
- Record: 8–10
- Division place: 3rd, West
- Playoffs: Lost West Semi-Final
- Team MOP: Weston Dressler
- Team MOC: Dominic Picard
- Team MOR: Xavier Fulton

Uniform

The 2012 Saskatchewan Roughriders season was the 55th season for the team in the Canadian Football League (CFL). The Roughriders finished the season in third place in the West Division with an 8–10 record, improving upon their 5–13 record from 2011. The Roughriders qualified for the playoffs and lost to the Calgary Stampeders in the Western Semi-Final.

During the off-season, the Roughriders hired Corey Chamblin as their head coach after Ken Miller had retired.

== Offseason ==
On December 15, 2011, Riders hired new head coach Corey Chamblin. On March 22, 2012, Riders traded their 2nd and 4th round picks in the Canadian College Draft to the Winnipeg Blue Bombers for Odell Willis. The Roughriders also signed soon-to-be all star and former National Football League running back Kory Sheets while also signing three quarterbacks in February.

=== CFL draft ===
The 2012 CFL draft took place on May 3, 2012 live at 1:00 PM CST. The Roughriders had the first overall draft pick and four selections total in the six-round draft, after trading away their second, fourth, and fifth round picks and acquiring Calgary's fifth round pick.

Round	Pick	Player	Position	School/Club team
1	1	Ben Heenan	OL	Saskatchewan
3	12	Samuel Hurl	LB	Calgary
5	35	Kevin Régimbald-Gagné	LB	Sherbrooke
6	39	Ismaël Bamba	WR	Sherbrooke

== Preseason ==
Week	Date	Opponent	Score	Result	Attendance	Record
A	Wed, June 13	at BC Lions	44–10	Loss	24,871	0–1
B	Fri, June 22	vs. Calgary Stampeders	33–31	Loss	30,998	0–2

# Games played with white uniforms.

== Regular season ==
Under the direction of Corey Chamblin, the Roughriders were leading 3–0 going into their game against Calgary, having beaten Hamilton, Edmonton and BC. Kory Sheets had already scored three touchdowns in consecutive games, and Weston Dressler was starting off strong. Roughriders kick returner Tristan Jackson returned a missed field goal by Paul McCallum, the first Rider to return a kick return since 2007.

The Roughriders then began losing close games, losing in overtime in Calgary and losing by one point to Hamilton, both games in which they held double-digit leads in the fourth quarter. Following the bye week, the team lost their next three, extending their losing streak to five games after opening the season 3-0.

The Riders were heading into the Labour Day Classic needing to find a way to win against the Winnipeg Blue Bombers. They defeated the Blue Bombers 52–0, which was the first time that Winnipeg was shut out in a game since 1969. The Roughriders then defeated Winnipeg again in the Banjo Bowl, winning it by a field goal by Sandro DeAngelis in the last minute, led by backup quarterback Drew Willy after Darian Durant was injured early in the game.

Willy then started in Montreal, but couldn't find a way to win. But Calgary was in Regina the next game, with Durant starting, and this time Chamblin "challenged" the defense to keep Jon Cornish away from the 100-yard mark, or "someone would lose their job". The defense was successful, and so was the offence, as the Roughriders got redemption from the Stampeders, winning 30–25.

The next game was against the defending champion BC Lions, with the season series tied one game apiece. The Roughriders got a huge win at home, with Greg Carr scoring a touchdown, and Weston Dressler, already having the greatest season of his career, snagging two. The team continued their winning streak against Toronto, dominating the Argonauts 36–10. The Roughriders RB Kory Sheets was going for the 1000 yard mark in rushing, in his first season in the CFL. He soon accomplished that, becoming the first Saskatchewan rookie running back to gain 1000 rushing yards since Darren Davis in 2000.

While the Roughriders lost their next two games, they nonetheless qualified for the playoffs after 16 games. A Calgary win over Hamilton gave the Riders a spot in the playoffs, as they were back to the playoffs under Chamblin control. Weston Dressler got his first career punt return touchdown, against Montreal on October 20.

=== Season standings ===
West Division
Team	GP	W	L	T	PF	PA	Pts	
BC Lions	18	13	5	0	481	354	26	Details
Calgary Stampeders	18	12	6	0	534	431	24	Details
Saskatchewan Roughriders	18	8	10	0	457	409	16	Details
Edmonton Eskimos	18	7	11	0	422	450	14	Details

=== Season schedule ===
Week	Date	Opponent	Score	Result	Attendance	Record
1	Fri, June 29	at Hamilton Tiger-Cats	43–16	Win	25,682	1–0
2	Sun, July 8	vs. Edmonton Eskimos	17–1	Win	31,459	2–0
3	Sat, July 14	vs. BC Lions	23–20	Win	32,080	3–0
4	Thurs, July 19	at Calgary Stampeders	41–38 (OT)	Loss	32,228	3–1
5	Sat, July 28	vs. Hamilton Tiger-Cats	35–34	Loss	32,898	3–2
6	Bye					3–2
7	Fri, Aug 10	at Edmonton Eskimos	28–20	Loss	43,178	3–3
8	Sun, Aug 19	at BC Lions	24–5	Loss	34,343	3–4
9	Sat, Aug 25	vs. Calgary Stampeders	17–10	Loss	33,427	3–5
ǁ 10 ǁ	Sun, Sept 2	vs. Winnipeg Blue Bombers	52–0	Win	33,427	4–5
11	Sun, Sept 9	at Winnipeg Blue Bombers	25–24	Win	30,077	5–5
12	Sun, Sept 16	at Montreal Alouettes	28–17	Loss	23,147	5–6
ǁ 13 ǁ	Sun, Sept 23	vs. Calgary Stampeders	30–25	Win	33,427	6–6
14	Sat, Sept 29	vs. BC Lions	27–21	Win	32,360	7–6
15	Mon, Oct 8	at Toronto Argonauts	36–10	Win	25,176	8–6
16	Sat, Oct 13	at Edmonton Eskimos	37–20	Loss	38,678	8–7
17	Sat, Oct 20	vs. Montreal Alouettes	34–28	Loss	32,003	8–8
18	Sat, Oct 27	vs. Toronto Argonauts	31–26	Loss	29,747	8–9
19	Sat, Nov 3	at BC Lions	17–6	Loss	36,357	8–10

== Roster ==
2012 Saskatchewan Roughriders final roster
Quarterbacks: 4 Darian Durant; 0 J. T. O'Sullivan; 5 Drew Willy; Running backs: 26 Graeme Bell; 32 Neal Hughes; 1 Kory Sheets; 9 Brandon West; Receivers: 84 Greg Carr; 89 Chris Getzlaf; 87 Aaron Hargreaves; 77 Kierrie Johnson; 18 Scott McHenry; 88 Taj Smith	Offensive linemen: 66 Chris Best G/C; 58 Xavier Fulton T; 65 Ben Heenan G; 51 Alexander Krausnick-Groh C; 57 Brendon LaBatte G; 53 Patrick Neufeld T/G; 68 Dominic Picard C; Defensive linemen: 91 Jay Alford DT; 93 Tearrius George DE; 90 Brent Hawkins DE; 74 Keith Shologan DT	Linebackers: 29 Tyron Brackenridge; 22 Diamond Ferri; 31 Sam Hurl; 52 Abraham Kromah; 8 Joe Lobendahn; 45 Mike McCullough; 99 Shomari Williams; Defensive backs: 28 Craig Butler; 3 Macho Harris; 38 Tristan Jackson; 30 Terrell Maze; 39 Chris McKenzie; 42 Graig Newman; 14 James Patrick; 16 Eddie Russ; 21 Paul Woldu	Special teams: 2 Sandro DeAngelis K/P; 47 Cory Huclack LS; Reserve roster: 7 Weston Dressler SB; 92 Zack Evans DT; 33 Ricky Schmitt K/P; 11 Odell Willis DE; Practice roster: 63 Johan Asiata T; 85 Ismaël Bamba WR; 67 Dan Clark G; 80 Phillip Livas WR; 25 Ramzee Robinson DB; 81 Limas Sweed WR	Injured List: 6 Rob Bagg WR (9 Game); 86 Dallas Baker WR (1 Game); 10 Levi Brown QB (1 Game); 15 Milt Collins DB (9 Game); 49 Chris Ellis DE (9 Game); 17 Brooks Foster SB (1 Game); 64 Dan Goodspeed T (1 Game); 27 Stephfon Green RB (1 Game); 82 Justin Harper WR (9 Game); 19 Chris Milo K (1 Game); 83 Sinorice Moss WR (9 Game); 96 Kenny Rowe DE (1 Game); 29 Jock Sanders RB (9 Game); 12 Jordan Sisco WR (9 Game); 24 Woodny Turenne CB (1 Game); 94 David Veikune DT (1 Game); 95 Mick Williams DT (1 Game); Italics indicate International player Roster updated 2026-05-10; Depth Chart • Transactions

== Coaching staff ==
2012 Saskatchewan Roughriders staff
Front office: President and ceo – Jim Hopson; General manager – Brendan Taman; Assistant general manager – Jeremy O'Day; Director of player personnel – Craig Smith; Director of U.S. Scouting – Vacant; Manager of Video Systems – David Dunster; Head coaches: Head coach – Corey Chamblin; Assistant to head coach – Alex Smith; Offensive coaches: Offensive coordinator/running backs – Bob Dyce; Run game coordinator/offensive line – Kris Sweet; Quarterbacks – Khari Jones; Receivers – Jason Tucker	Defensive coaches: Defensive coordinator – Richie Hall; Defensive line – Mike Walker; Linebackers – Alex Smith; Defensive backs – Barron Miles; Special teams coaches: Special teams coordinator – Craig Dickenson; Strength and conditioning: Strength and conditioning coordinator – Dan Farthing; → Coaching staff

== Playoffs ==
=== Schedule ===
Week	Game	Date	Time	Opponent	Score	Result	Attendance
20	‖ West Semi-Final ‖	Nov 11	3:30 PM CST	at Calgary Stampeders	36–30	Loss	30,027

‖ # ‖ Games played with white retro alternate uniforms.

=== West Semi-Final ===
Saskatchewan at Calgary

Team	1	2	3	4	Total
Roughriders	3	13	0	14	30
• Stampeders	0	19	7	10	36

- Date: November 11
- Location: McMahon Stadium
  Calgary, AB
- Game start: 2:30 PM MST
- Game attendance: 30,027
- Referee: Al Bradbury
- TV announcers (TSN): Rod Black (Play by Play), Duane Forde (Colour), Lee Jones (Sideline)
