= Taj Smith =

American gridiron football player (born 1983)

No. 10, 88
- Position: Wide receiver

Personal information
- Born: September 30, 1983 (age 43); Newark, New Jersey, U.S.
- Listed height: 6 ft 0 in (1.83 m)
- Listed weight: 192 lb (87 kg)

Career information
- High school: Weequahic (NJ)
- College: Syracuse
- NFL draft: 2008: undrafted

Career history
- Green Bay Packers (2008)*; Indianapolis Colts (2008–2010); Saskatchewan Roughriders (2012–2015)
- * Offseason or practice squad member only

Awards and highlights
- Grey Cup champion (2013)
- Stats at Pro Football Reference
- Stats at CFL.ca (archive)

Tajiddin M. Smith-Wilson (born September 30, 1983) is an American former professional football wide receiver who played for the Indianapolis Colts of the National Football League (NFL) and the Saskatchewan Roughriders of the Canadian Football League (CFL). He was signed by the Green Bay Packers as an undrafted free agent in 2008. He played college football at Syracuse and Bakersfield Community College.

== Professional career ==
=== Green Bay Packers ===
In his first 2008 preseason game with the Green Bay Packers, Smith caught two passes for 23 yards against the Cincinnati Bengals. He was waived by the team during final cuts on August 30.

=== Indianapolis Colts ===
Smith was signed to the practice squad of the Indianapolis Colts on September 25, 2008. He was released on December 3, but re-signed on December 8. After finishing the season on the practice squad, Smith was re-signed to a future contract on January 5, 2009. He spent the 2009 season on the practice squad, and was re-signed to a future contract on February 11, 2010. Taj Smith was cut on the Indianapolis Colts roster cut down day and was a free agent. He was later re-signed to add depth to Indianapolis's depleted receiver corps. On December 5, in a game against the Dallas Cowboys Smith blocked a punt and recovered it in the endzone, tying the game for the Colts. Played in all 4 preseason games in 2011. He finished with 12 catches, 210 yards and 2TD and in the last preseason game he ended well with 8 catches, 140 yards, and the game winning Touchdown.

On September 3, 2011, Smith was waived by the Colts.

=== Saskatchewan Roughriders ===
Smith signed with the Saskatchewan Roughriders of the CFL on January 30, 2012. In his first year in the CFL he spent the first four weeks on the practice roster and missed 1 game due to injury. Smith would go on to start 13 regular season games and the West Semi-Final at the wide receiver position. He finished with 47 catches for 690 yards and 2 touchdowns. Smith also played special teams adding 3 tackles, and had 4 catches for 81 yards in the playoffs.

In his second season in the CFL Smith became a more significant element of the Roughriders offense. Smith played in 17 of the 18 regular season games and totaled 1,007 receiving yards (7th most in the league) on 78 passes with 7 touchdowns. He added 191 receiving yards in 3 playoff games, and the Roughriders went on to win the 101st Grey Cup. On January 16, 2014, Smith signed a new contract with the Roughriders, he was to become a free-agent in February 2014 if he was not signed.

== CFL statistics ==
Receiving		Regular season						Playoffs
Year	Team	Games	No.	Yards	Avg	Long	TD	Games	No.	Yards	Avg	Long	TD
2012	SSK	13	47	690	14.7	74	2	1	4	81	20.3	40	0
2013	SSK	17	78	1,007	12.9	70	7	3	12	191	15.9	53	0
2014	SSK	12	29	397	13.7	59	3
2015	SSK	4	8	94	11.8	36	1
CFL totals		46	162	2,188	13.5	74	13	4	16	272	17.0	53	0
