= Weston Dressler =

American football player (born 1985)

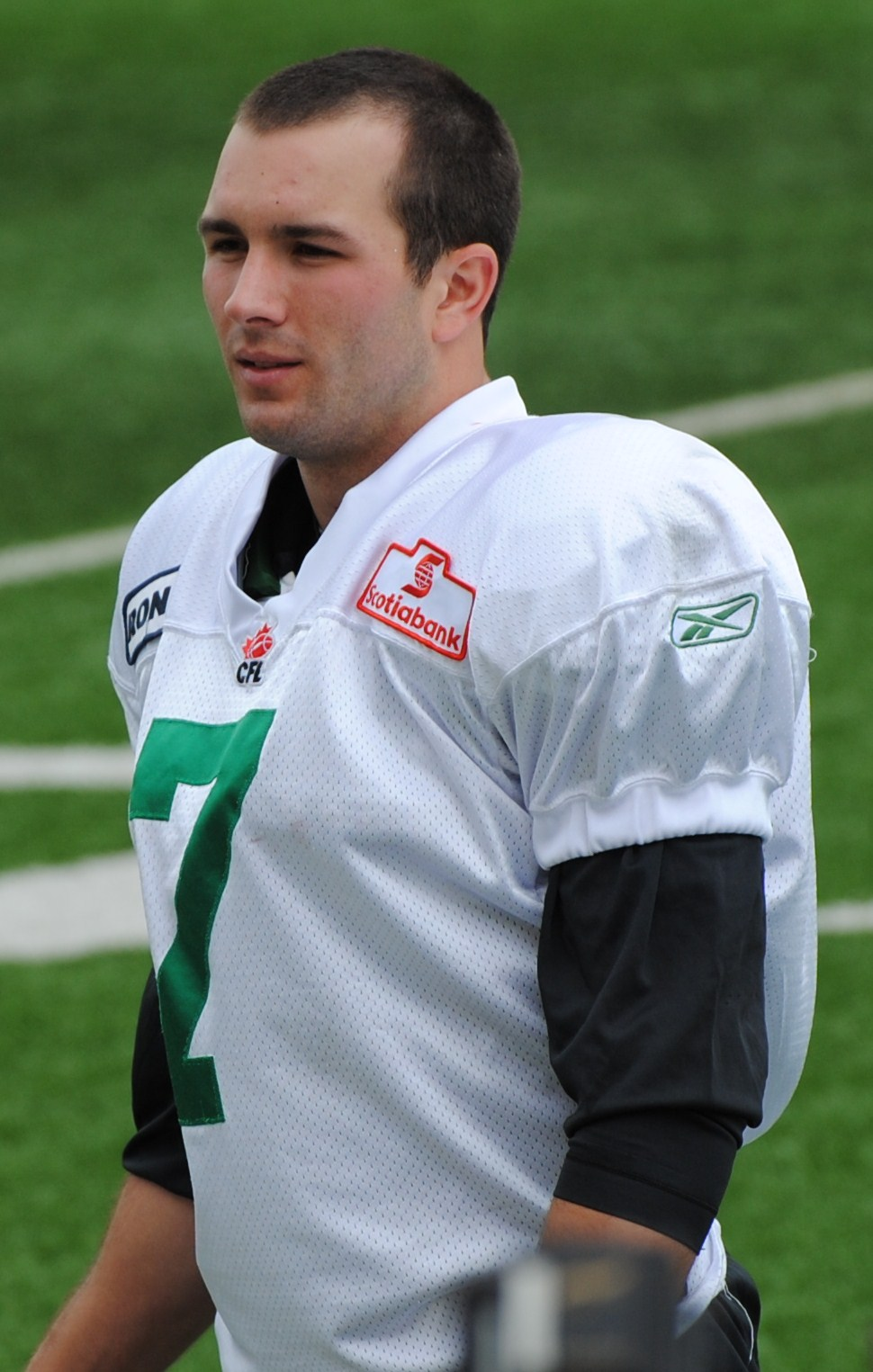
- Dressler with the Saskatchewan Roughriders in 2010

No. 7
- Position: Slotback

Personal information
- Born: June 14, 1985 (age 41); Bismarck, North Dakota, U.S.
- Listed height: 5 ft 7 in (1.70 m)
- Listed weight: 168 lb (76 kg)

Career information
- High school: Bismarck
- College: North Dakota

Career history
- 2008–2013: Saskatchewan Roughriders
- 2014: Kansas City Chiefs*
- 2014–2015: Saskatchewan Roughriders
- 2016–2018: Winnipeg Blue Bombers
- * Offseason or practice squad member only

Awards and highlights
- Grey Cup champion (2013); CFL's Most Outstanding Rookie Award (2008); 2× CFL All-Star (2012, 2013); 4× CFL West All-Star (2009, 2011–2013); Jackie Parker Trophy (2008); Gatorade High School Player of the Year (2003)

Career CFL statistics
- Games played: 161
- Receptions: 715
- Receiving Yards: 10,026
- Touchdowns: 61
- Stats at Pro Football Reference
- Stats at CFL.ca
- Canadian Football Hall of Fame (Class of 2024)

Weston Dressler (born June 14, 1985) is an American former professional football player who was a slotback for 11 years in the Canadian Football League (CFL). He spent the majority of his career with the Saskatchewan Roughriders with whom he won a Grey Cup championship in 2013. Dressler was a two-time CFL All-Star and a four-time CFL West All-Star and was named the CFL's Most Outstanding Rookie in 2008. He had also been a member of the Kansas City Chiefs of the National Football League (NFL) and the Winnipeg Blue Bombers (CFL). He played college football for the North Dakota Fighting Hawks.

== Early life ==
Dressler was born in Bismarck, North Dakota, to Rick and Val Dressler. He attended Bismarck High School. At Bismarck he was a three time all-state and all-conference selection and in 2003 was named North Dakota Gatorade High School Player of the Year. On March 23, 2009, his Bismarck high school retired his jersey (#2).

== College career ==
Dressler played college football for the Fighting Hawks of the University of North Dakota. As a senior, he caught 75 passes for 1,274 receiving yards while being named to the North Central Conference's all-star team for the fourth season in a row. After four seasons at North Dakota, Dressler set 19 school records.

== Professional career ==
=== Saskatchewan Roughriders ===
Dressler went undrafted in the 2008 NFL draft and signed as a street free agent with the Saskatchewan Roughriders on May 13, 2008. After the Roughriders named their final cuts, Dressler was one of five rookies to make the final team. After two games with the Roughriders he led the league with 13 punt returns for 185 yards. On July 14, Dressler suffered a hamstring injury that forced him out of the lineup. Towards the end of the season, Dressler was being considered as the leading candidate for the CFL West's nomination for rookie of the year. As of October 18, Dressler had 46 catches for 928 yards with five touchdowns including six 100+ yard games. On November 5, it became official and Dressler was nominated for rookie of the year. Dressler later won the award over Hamilton's Prechae Rodriguez. Dressler finished the season with a team-leading 1,123 yards receiving (11th overall) and 2,219 combined yards (3rd overall). At the end of the 2008 season, he was voted the most popular player by the fans.

Ensuring that there would be no sophomore slump, Dressler had the most receiving yards in a game in his young career when he caught seven passes for 154 yards against the BC Lions in the home opener. Because of his value as a receiver, the Roughrider coaching staff pulled him from the kick return game and only used him in critical situations on special teams. Ken Miller, the Saskatchewan head coach, and Paul LaPolice, the offensive coordinator, used many different formations in order to get Dressler the ball, from the slotback position, to wideout, to handoffs. On August 21, 2009, against the Montreal Alouettes, Dressler caught eight passes for 179 yards, his most yards gained in a single game to date. On Oct. 10, 2009, Dressler's season came to a close as he sustained a sprained right ankle and fractured right fibula in the closing minutes of a win over the Toronto Argonauts, halting his receiving yardage total under 1,000 yards.

In the ensuing four seasons, Dressler's receptions exceeded the 1,000 yard mark every year. In 2013, Dressler was a CFL All Star and won the 101st Grey Cup. On January 30, 2014, Dressler was released from the Saskatchewan Roughriders so he could sign with a National Football League team.

=== Kansas City Chiefs ===
On February 5, 2014, Dressler signed a futures contract with the NFL's Kansas City Chiefs. He was waived on August 25.

=== Saskatchewan Roughriders ===
On August 27, after clearing NFL waivers, Dressler was offered contracts from the Saskatchewan Roughriders, Calgary Stampeders and Ottawa Redblacks. The offer from the Stampeders was reportedly worth just under $200,000 CAD per year, while the offer from the Redblacks was worth $250,000 - which would have made him the highest-paid non-quarterback in the CFL - though Redblacks General Manager Marcel Desjardins declined to confirm these reports. However, on August 28 Dressler instead agreed to a contract with the Roughriders that is reputedly worth a pro-rated $200,000 CAD for one year, sizeably less than the Redblacks offer.

In his return to Saskatchewan on August 31, 2014, Dressler had three receptions for 28 yards in a 35-30 win over the Winnipeg Blue Bombers in the Labour Day Classic. During the Banjo Bowl against the Winnipeg Blue Bombers, Dressler returned a punt for a touchdown, his second of his CFL career. On September 21, 2014, Dressler recorded 125 receiving yards in a win over the Ottawa Redblacks, a game where he returned another punt for a touchdown. Dressler tied the all-time number one record (CFL and NFL) for the most two point conversions caught in a single game by one player at two in a 31-24 loss to the Calgary Stampeders on October 3, 2014. He wound up playing in the final 9 games of the 2014 season and the Riders lone playoff game. On January 30, 2015, Dressler re-signed with the Roughriders, agreeing to a new 4-year contract extension.

On January 16, 2016, the Roughriders released Dressler.

=== Winnipeg Blue Bombers ===
On January 26, 2016, the Winnipeg Blue Bombers announced that they had signed Dressler to a two-year deal through the 2017 CFL season. In his first year with the Bombers he played in 16 games, and broke the 1,000 receiving yard plateau for the sixth time in his career. In 2017 Dressler played in 11 games, caught 51 passes for 691 yards with three touchdowns. Dressler played the first half of the 2018 season before being placed on the six-game injured reserve with a lower-body injury. On October 26, 2018, he caught a pass that put him over the 10,000 receiving-yard mark, becoming the 17th player in league history to accomplish that feat. Dressler was notified prior to the 2019 CFL free agency period that he will not be offered a contract with the organization, making him a free agent after three seasons with the team.

Dressler was announced as a member of the Canadian Football Hall of Fame 2024 class on May 3, 2024.

== Statistics ==
Receiving		Regular season						Playoffs
Year	Team	Games	No.	Yards	Avg	Long	TD	Games	No.	Yards	Avg	Long	TD
2008	SSK	15	56	1,123	20.1	67	6	1	5	93	18.6	40	0
2009	SSK	14	62	941	15.2	52	4	0	0	0	0	0	0
2010	SSK	17	81	1,189	14.7	77	6	3	13	174	13.4	75	2
2011	SSK	18	79	1,061	13.4	75	5	Team did not qualify
2012	SSK	17	94	1,206	12.8	78	14	1	6	153	25.5	58	0
2013	SSK	17	70	1,011	14.4	45	9	3	16	240	15.0	37	4
2014	SSK	9	27	320	11.9	60	1	1	4	35	8.8	17	0
2015	SSK	16	70	941	13.4	79	6	Team did not qualify
2016	WPG	14	80	1,003	12.5	50	2	1	3	98	32.7	60	0
2017	WPG	11	51	691	13.5	87	3	1	9	114	12.7	20	2
2018	WPG	13	45	535	11.9	37	5	2	6	63	10.5	26	0
CFL totals		161	715	10,026	14.0	87	61	13	62	970	15.6	75	8

== Personal life ==
Dressler has two brothers, Travis and Ryan. His younger brother, Ryan, played wide receiver at The University of North Dakota from 2006 to 2010.
