= George Cortez =

American gridiron football coach

Profile
- Position: Running backs coach

Personal information
- Born: February 11, 1951 (age 75); Port Arthur, Texas, U.S.

Career history
- 1979–1982: Rice (OLC)
- 1984–1985: Montreal Concordes (RBC)
- 1986: Montreal Alouettes (DLC)
- 1987–1989: Lamar (OLC/RBC)
- 1990–1991: Ottawa Rough Riders (STC/DLC)
- 1992–1994: Calgary Stampeders (OLC)
- 1995–1996: SMU (QC)
- 1997: Calgary Stampeders (SC)
- 1998–2001: Calgary Stampeders (OC/QC)
- 2002–2005: California (OC/QC)
- 2006: Saskatchewan Roughriders (OC)
- 2007–2009: Calgary Stampeders (OC)
- 2010–2011: Buffalo Bills (QC)
- 2012: Hamilton Tiger-Cats (HC/OC)
- 2013–2014: Saskatchewan Roughriders (OC)
- 2015: BC Lions (OC)
- 2020: Calgary Stampeders (RBC)

Awards and highlights
- 5× Grey Cup champion (1992, 1998, 2001, 2008, 2013)

George Cortez (born February 11, 1951) is a gridiron football coach who spent most of his coaching career in the Canadian Football League (CFL). He was notably the head coach for the Hamilton Tiger-Cats during the 2012 season. He attended Texas A&M University.

== Coaching career ==
Cortez's coaching career began in 1979 where he was the offensive line coach for the Rice Owls of Rice University. He began his CFL coaching career with the Montreal Concordes in 1984 as the running backs coach. He later served as an assistant coach for the Ottawa Rough Riders, Calgary Stampeders, Saskatchewan Roughriders, and BC Lions. He was hired as the head coach for the Hamilton Tiger-Cats in 2012, but was fired after a 6-12 finish.

Cortez was hired as the running backs coach for the Calgary Stampeders for the 2020 season, which was eventually cancelled, and was not retained for 2021 due to the new league-imposed salary cap.

== Head coaching record ==
Team	Year	Regular season					Postseason		
Team	Year	Won	Lost	Ties	Win %	Finish	Won	Lost	Result
HAM	2012	6	12	0	.333	4th in East Division	-	-	Failed to Qualify
Total		6	12	0	.333	0 Division; Championships	0	0	0 Grey Cups
