= Renauld Williams =

American gridiron football player (born 1981)

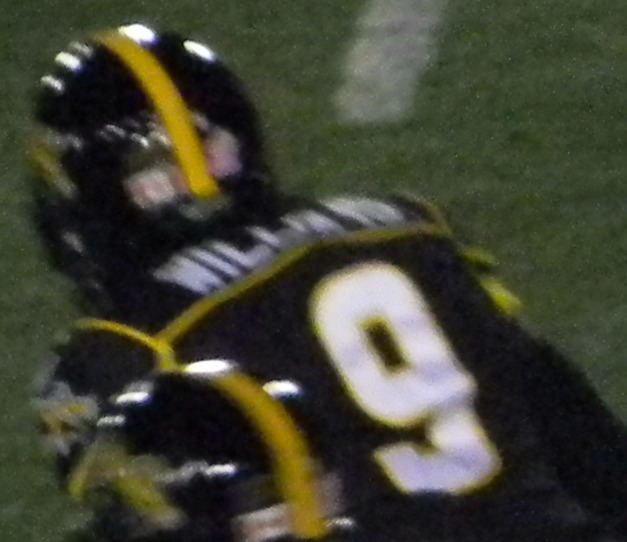
- Williams in 2011

No. 48
- Position: Linebacker

Personal information
- Born: February 23, 1981 (age 45); Westbury, New York, U.S.
- Listed height: 6 ft 0 in (1.83 m)
- Listed weight: 228 lb (103 kg)

Career information
- College: Hofstra
- NFL draft: 2004: undrafted

Career history
- San Francisco 49ers (2004)*; Miami Dolphins (2004); Cleveland Browns (2005)*; New York Jets (2005)*; San Francisco 49ers (2005–2006); Saskatchewan Roughriders (2007–2009); Pittsburgh Steelers (2010)*; Hamilton Tiger-Cats (2011–2012); Saskatchewan Roughriders (2013)
- * Offseason or practice squad member only

Awards and highlights
- Grey Cup champion (2013); First-team All-A-10 (2003)
- Stats at Pro Football Reference
- Stats at CFL.ca (archive)

Renauld Duvall Williams (born February 23, 1981) is an American former professional football linebacker. He was signed by the San Francisco 49ers as an undrafted free agent in 2004. He played college football at Hofstra. Williams was also a member of the Miami Dolphins, Cleveland Browns, New York Jets, Saskatchewan Roughriders, Pittsburgh Steelers, and Hamilton Tiger-Cats.

== Early life ==
Williams was a standout running back in high school at Friends Academy and was a four-year starter.

== College career ==
Heavily recruited to play at Penn State, Williams was injured during his junior year which caused him to play at the University of New Hampshire. After two years of waiting to start he decided to transfer to Hofstra University where he became a two-year starter as a defensive lineman.
