= Weldon Brown =

American gridiron football player (born 1987)

No. 35
- Position: Linebacker

Personal information
- Born: May 12, 1987 (age 39); Bossier City, Louisiana, U.S.
- Listed height: 5 ft 10 in (1.78 m)
- Listed weight: 185 lb (84 kg)

Career information
- High school: Bossier
- College: Louisiana Tech

Career history
- 2009: Jacksonville Jaguars*
- 2010–2012: Edmonton Eskimos
- 2013–2015: Saskatchewan Roughriders
- * Offseason or practice squad member only

Awards and highlights
- Grey Cup champion (2013)

Weldon Brown (born May 12, 1987) is an American former professional football player. He played college football as a cornerback at Louisiana Tech University. Weldon was signed as an undrafted free agent by the Jacksonville Jaguars of the National Football League (NFL) on April 26, 2009, after the 2009 NFL draft. He played in the Canadian Football League (CFL) with the Edmonton Eskimos from 2010 to 2012 and the Saskatchewan Roughriders from 2013 to 2015.
