= Spencer Moore =

Canadian football player (born 1990)

No. 80
- Position: Fullback

Personal information
- Born: July 25, 1990 (age 36); Hamilton, Ontario, Canada
- Listed height: 6 ft 4 in (1.93 m)
- Listed weight: 230 lb (104 kg)

Career information
- University: McMaster
- CFL draft: 2013: 5th round, 44th overall pick

Career history
- 2013–2018: Saskatchewan Roughriders
- 2019–2021: Montreal Alouettes

Awards and highlights
- 47th Vanier Cup champion; 101st Grey Cup champion
- Stats at CFL.ca

Spencer Moore (born July 25, 1990) is a Canadian former professional football fullback who played for nine years in the Canadian Football League (CFL).

== University career ==
Moore played CIS football for the McMaster Marauders and was part of the 47th Vanier Cup championship team.

== Professional career ==
=== Saskatchewan Roughriders ===
Moore was drafted in the fifth round, 44th overall by the Saskatchewan Roughriders in the 2013 CFL draft and signed with the team on May 30, 2013. He was on the nine-game injured list when the Roughriders won the 101st Grey Cup.

=== Montreal Alouettes ===
Moore was traded to the Montreal Alouettes in December 2018 for a conditional eighth-round draft pick. He played in 16 regular season games where he had seven receptions for 54 yards and seven special teams tackles. He did not play in 2020 due to the cancellation of the 2020 CFL season.

Moore was placed on the suspended list by the Montreal Alouettes on July 6, 2021. He re-joined the team and played in seven games and had two special teams tackles and one catch for four yards. He announced his retirement on September 22, 2022.
