= Rennie Curran =

American football player (born 1988)

No. 53
- Position: Linebacker

Personal information
- Born: November 10, 1988 (age 37); Atlanta, Georgia, U.S.
- Listed height: 5 ft 11 in (1.80 m)
- Listed weight: 230 lb (104 kg)

Career information
- High school: Brookwood (Snellville, Georgia)
- College: Georgia
- NFL draft: 2010: 3rd round, 97th overall pick

Career history
- Tennessee Titans (2010); Tampa Bay Buccaneers (2012)*; Edmonton Eskimos (2013–2014); BC Lions (2015)
- * Offseason or practice squad member only

Awards and highlights
- First-team All-American (2009); Sophomore All-American (2008); Freshman All-American (2007); 2× First-team All-SEC (2008, 2009)

Career NFL statistics
- Total tackles: 7
- Stats at Pro Football Reference
- Stats at CFL.ca (archive)

Rennie Curran (born November 10, 1988) is an American former professional football player who was a linebacker in the National Football League (NFL) and Canadian Football League (CFL). He played college football for the Georgia Bulldogs. Curran was considered one of the top weakside linebackers of his class, and has been called "the most dominant defensive player in the game" by The Sporting News. In January 2010, Curran announced that he was forgoing his final year of eligibility to enter the 2010 NFL draft. He was the 97th pick in the draft by the Titans.

== Early life ==
Curran attended Brookwood High School in Snellville, Georgia, where he became the Broncos’ all-time leading tackler and was twice named Gwinnett County Touchdown Club Defensive Player of the Year. He was named to the Atlanta Journal-Constitution Super Southern 100 and Class AAAAA First-team Defense.

Considered a four-star recruit by Rivals.com, Curran was listed as the No. 11 inside linebacker prospect in the nation.

== College career ==
As a true freshman in 2007, Curran appeared in 11 games making five starts with 53 tackles including 9 for loss and 3 quarterback sacks. He received Freshman First-team All-America honors by Rivals.com, and Honorable Mention by The Sporting News.

In his sophomore season, Curran started all 13 games leading the team in tackles (115), including a team-leading 10 for a loss and a team-high 3 sacks to go along with two forced fumbles. His 115 tackles were the most by a Bulldog since Orantes Grant recorded 120 in 1998. Curran was a finalist for the Butkus Award and earned Sophomore All-American honors by College Football News.

In 2009, his junior season, he was voted First-team All-SEC by the AP and Coaches, and was also named First-team All-America by CBSSports.com after leading the SEC in tackles with 116.

== Professional career ==
=== Tennessee Titans ===
The Tennessee Titans selected Rennie Curran in the third round with the 97th pick of the 2010 NFL draft. He was given the number 53, the number of fan-favorite Keith Bulluck, a linebacker who was released earlier in the year. He was released on September 2, 2011.

=== Tampa-Bay Buccaneers ===
Curran spent some time as a member of the Tampa Bay Buccaneers of the National Football League during the 2012 NFL season, but did not see any playing time

=== Edmonton Eskimos ===
Curran joined the Edmonton Eskimos of the Canadian Football League in time for the 2013 CFL season; of which he played in 16 of the 18 regular season games. In his first season in the CFL he amassed 70 tackles, 10 special teams tackles, 2 sacks and 2 interceptions; one of which was for a defensive touchdown. Curran had 53 defensive tackles and 7 special teams tackles in the 2014 CFL season. He was not resigned by the Eskimos prior to the start of CFL free-agency on February 10, 2015, and thus was a free agent.

=== BC Lions ===
On September 22, 2015, it was announced that Curran had signed with the BC Lions.

He participated in The Spring League in 2017 with hopes of returning to the NFL, but suffered a career-ending patella tendon injury.

== Personal life ==
Curran became the author of his first book "Free Agent" - The Perspectives of A Young African American Athlete on April 4, 2012. The book was published by Rathsi Publishing and the foreword was written by University of Georgia head coach Mark Richt. He is a public speaker and has spoken to a wide variety of organizations including schools, churches, and corporate businesses. He began playing the piano at the age of eight, the drums at the age of ten, and the viola at the age of thirteen.
