= Josh Neiswander =

American gridiron player and coach (born 1986)

No. 9
- Position: Quarterback

Personal information
- Born: December 2, 1986 (age 39); Winnsboro, Texas, U.S.
- Listed height: 6 ft 2 in (1.88 m)
- Listed weight: 212 lb (96 kg)

Career information
- College: Angelo State Rams

Career history

Playing
- 2011–2013: Montreal Alouettes

Coaching
- 2020: Tampa Bay Vipers (QB)
- 2023: San Antonio Brahmas (QB)
- Stats at CFL.ca (archive)

Josh Neiswander (born December 2, 1986) is an American former professional football quarterback who played for the Montreal Alouettes of the Canadian Football League (CFL). He was signed by the Alouettes on June 11, 2011. He dressed in all 17 games during the following season as a backup to Anthony Calvillo, football's all-time leader in passing yards, touchdowns, and completions. He started his first professional game against the BC Lions on August 22, 2013, and started 4 more games that season, throwing for 1,369 yards and 9 touchdowns in his first professional season. He graduated with a Master's in Business Administration from Angelo State University while breaking every major passing record in school history.

Neiswander became the quarterbacks coach for the Tampa Bay Vipers of the XFL in 2019, which reunited him with Montreal head coach Marc Trestman.

Neiswander was the quarterbacks coach of the San Antonio Brahmas of the XFL in 2023. He was not retained after the 2023 XFL season after the departure of head coach Hines Ward.
