= Levi Steinhauer =

Canadian football player (born 1991)

No. 56
- Positions: Fullback, long snapper

Personal information
- Born: January 19, 1991 (age 35); Moose Jaw, Saskatchewan, Canada
- Listed height: 6 ft 3 in (1.91 m)
- Listed weight: 235 lb (107 kg)

Career information
- University: Saskatchewan
- CFL draft: 2013: 5th round, 40th overall pick

Career history
- 2013–2016: Saskatchewan Roughriders
- 2017: Edmonton Eskimos

Awards and highlights
- Grey Cup champion (2013)
- Stats at CFL.ca

Levi Steinhauer (born January 19, 1991) is a Canadian former professional football fullback who played for the Saskatchewan Roughriders and Edmonton Eskimos of the Canadian Football League (CFL). He was drafted 40th overall by the Roughriders in the 2013 CFL draft and signed with the team on May 30, 2013. Steinhauer played CIS football for the Saskatchewan Huskies. On November 10, 2015, Steinhauer was resigned for the 2016 CFL season. He was released by the Roughriders on February 1, 2017.
