= Zack Evans =

Canadian gridiron football player (born 1990)

No. 92
- Position: Defensive tackle

Personal information
- Born: June 27, 1990 (age 36); Regina, Saskatchewan, Canada
- Listed height: 6 ft 4 in (1.93 m)
- Listed weight: 295 lb (134 kg)

Career information
- CJFL: Regina Thunder

Career history
- 2012–2013: Saskatchewan Roughriders
- 2014–2017: Ottawa Redblacks
- 2018–2020: Saskatchewan Roughriders

Awards and highlights
- Grey Cup champion (2013, 2016); CFL East All-Star (2016)
- Stats at CFL.ca

Zack Evans (born June 27, 1990) is a Canadian former professional football defensive lineman. He is a two-time Grey Cup champion having won the 101st Grey Cup as a member of the Saskatchewan Roughriders and the 104th Grey Cup with the Ottawa Redblacks.

== Junior career ==
Evans played junior football for the Regina Thunder of the Canadian Junior Football League from 2009 to 2011. In 2011, he was an All- Canadian in the CJFL and also a finalist for the CJFL's Top Defensive Player award.

== Professional career ==
=== Saskatchewan Roughriders (first stint) ===
Evans was signed by the Saskatchewan Roughriders as a territorial exemption on May 29, 2012. He made his professional debut in the team's season-opening game on June 29, 2012, against the Hamilton Tiger-Cats. He played in eight regular season games in his rookie year, recording two defensive tackles. He also made his post-season debut, playing in the team's West Semi-Final loss to the Calgary Stampeders. In 2013, he began the season on the injured reserve, but played in the last eight regular season games, including in the October 12, 2013 game against the Edmonton Eskimos where he recorded his first career quarterback sack. He played in all three post-season games in 2013, including his Grey Cup debut in the 101st Grey Cup game. There, Evans won his first Grey Cup championship as the Roughriders defeated the Hamilton Tiger-Cats in his hometown of Regina.

=== Ottawa Redblacks ===
With the Ottawa Redblacks joining the CFL for the 2014 CFL season, Evans was eligible to be selected in the 2013 CFL Expansion Draft. He was indeed selected on December 15, 2013, in the expansion draft in the third round and his playing rights transferred to the Redblacks. With Ottawa, Evans became more of a regular rotational player as he played in all 18 regular season games and had four starts in 2014. He had 20 defensive tackles and three quarterback sacks in his first year with the Redblacks. In 2015, he did not start any of the 17 regular season games that he played, but he still recorded 17 defensive tackles and a career-high seven sacks. He also recorded not only his first career interception, but also his first professional touchdown, on July 9, 2015, after intercepting Eskimos' quarterback Matt Nichols and returning it 66 yards for the score. He also played in his second Grey Cup game, which was a loss in the 103rd Grey Cup match against the Edmonton Eskimos. During the following off-season, on January 4, 2016, he signed a two-year contract extension with the Redblacks.

Evans established himself as a regular starter in 2016 as he played and started in 17 regular season games while sitting out the final game of the season due to the Redblacks already securing first place in the East Division. With the increased playing time he enjoyed a career year with 24 defensive tackles, six sacks, and a fumble recovery. As a result, he was named a CFL Division All-Star for the first time in his career. To cap off the season, he played and started in both post-season games for the Redblacks and won his second Grey Cup championship with a victory in the 104th Grey Cup game. Evans continued his strong play in 2017 by playing and starting in 18 regular season games and recording 23 defensive tackles and five quarterback sacks. In total, he played in 70 regular season games with the Redblacks and had 84 defensive tackles and 21 sacks before becoming a free agent.

=== Saskatchewan Roughriders (second stint) ===
On February 13, 2018, Evans signed re-signed with the Roughriders. He played and started in all 18 regular season games and had career lows as a starter with 15 defensive tackles, one sack, and one forced fumble. He did, however, have a career-high four fumble recoveries, including his first fumble recovery returned for a touchdown on October 27, 2018, against BC Lions. After the season, it was announced that he had signed a four-year contract extension with the Roughriders on December 18, 2018. He had an injury-shortened season in 2019 where he played in only 11 regular season games and had four defensive tackles and one sack. After the 2020 CFL season was cancelled due to the COVID-19 pandemic, the Roughriders released Evans on December 18, 2020.
