= Jermaine McElveen =

American gridiron football player (born 1984)

No. 98
- Position: Defensive end

Personal information
- Born: August 29, 1984 (age 42); Chicago, Illinois, U.S.
- Listed height: 6 ft 4 in (1.93 m)
- Listed weight: 250 lb (113 kg)

Career information
- College: UAB
- NFL draft: 2007: undrafted

Career history
- Tennessee Titans (2007)*; Montreal Alouettes (2008–2011); Hamilton Tiger-Cats (2012); Saskatchewan Roughriders (2013); Montreal Alouettes (2014)
- * Offseason or practice squad member only

Awards and highlights
- 3× Grey Cup champion (2009, 2010, 2013)
- Stats at CFL.ca (archive)

Jermaine McElveen (born August 29, 1984) is an American former professional football defensive end who played in the Canadian Football League (CFL). He played college football at UAB.

== Professional career ==
=== Tennessee Titans ===
McElveen was signed by the Tennessee Titans as an undrafted free agent in 2007.

=== Montreal Alouettes ===
McElveen spent four seasons with the Montreal Alouettes beginning in 2008. He recorded a career-high eight sacks in 2010.

=== Hamilton Tiger-Cats ===
McElveen signed with the Hamilton Tiger-Cats for the 2012 CFL season. Posted a career high 31 tackles.

=== Saskatchewan Roughriders ===
On May 23, 2013, McElveen was traded to the Saskatchewan Roughriders in exchange for wide receiver Lyle Leong.

=== Montreal Alouettes ===
Upon entering free agency, McElveen signed with the Montreal Alouettes after a two-year absence from the team on February 13, 2014. He was released by the Alouettes on November 27, 2014.
