= Ricky Schmitt =

American gridiron football player (born 1985)

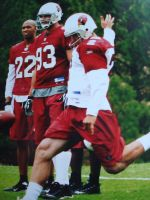
- Schmitt with the Arizona Cardinals in 2007

No. 2
- Position: Punter/Placekicker

Personal information
- Born: August 17, 1985 (age 41); Virginia Beach, Virginia
- Listed height: 6 ft 3 in (1.91 m)
- Listed weight: 213 lb (97 kg)

Career information
- College: Shepherd (WV)
- NFL draft: 2007: undrafted

Career history
- Arizona Cardinals (2007)*; San Francisco 49ers (2008)*; Pittsburgh Steelers (2008)*; Oakland Raiders (2008–2009)*; San Francisco 49ers (2009); Tennessee Titans (2010)*; San Diego Chargers (2011)*; Arizona Cardinals (2012)*; Saskatchewan Roughriders (2012–2013); BC Lions (2014)
- * Offseason or practice squad member only

Awards and highlights
- Grey Cup champion (2013)

Career NFL statistics
- FG made - Attempted: 2-3
- XP made - Attempted: 2-2
- Career Long FG: 39
- Stats at Pro Football Reference
- Stats at CFL.ca (archive)

Ricky William Schmitt (born August 17, 1985) is a former gridiron football punter and place kicker. He was signed by the Arizona Cardinals as an undrafted free agent in 2007. He played college football at Shepherd University.

Schmitt was also a member of the San Diego Chargers, Pittsburgh Steelers, Oakland Raiders, San Francisco 49ers, Tennessee Titans, Saskatchewan Roughriders, and BC Lions.

== Early life ==
Schmitt graduated from Salem High School in Virginia Beach, Virginia in 2003, but did not play football until his senior year. A four-year varsity letterman in soccer, Schmitt only went out for football due to the Sun Devils' need for a kicker. He was named an all-Beach District punter/kicker his senior year. He also played basketball. Schmitt was offered a scholarship to play soccer for Virginia Tech.

== College career ==
Schmitt played college football at Shepherd University, a Division II school in West Virginia. He was one of the premier punters/kickers in the NCAA. In 2006 he would have been among the leaders of all divisions in punting statistics however his offense only allowed him to punt 41 times (not enough to qualify for the leaders). In spring testing Schmitt was one of the fastest members of the Shepherd University squad recording 40-yard dash times in the 4.4’s. He is a three-time first team All-WVIAC selection as a punter and a two-time first team selection as a kicker. 2006 Daktronics Division II First Team All-Northeast Region selection and a second-team All-American in 2006.

Additionally Schmitt holds virtually all Shepherd kicking records including:

- All-time leader in career field goals (33)
- Most extra points in a career (151)
- Most extra points in a season (50-54, 2005)
- Most kick scoring points in a season (80, 2005)
- Most consecutive extra points in a career (60)
- Most consecutive extra points in a season (43)
- 2006 Single-season extra point percentage (100% 43-43)
- Career extra point percentage (.926 - 151-163)
- WVIAC Record in 2006

Schmitt punted 41 times for a 44 average, with a long of 77, and 22 punts inside the 20 in 2006. A master of directional punts, with a 5 sec. hangtime only 17 of his punts were returned. He had eighteen kickoffs for touchbacks.

== Professional career ==
=== Arizona Cardinals ===
Schmitt was signed as an undrafted free agent by the Arizona Cardinals following the 2007 NFL draft. He was cut on August 27. During the Cardinals preseason, Ricky punted 3 times for 114 yards, for an average of 38 yards.

=== First stint with 49ers ===
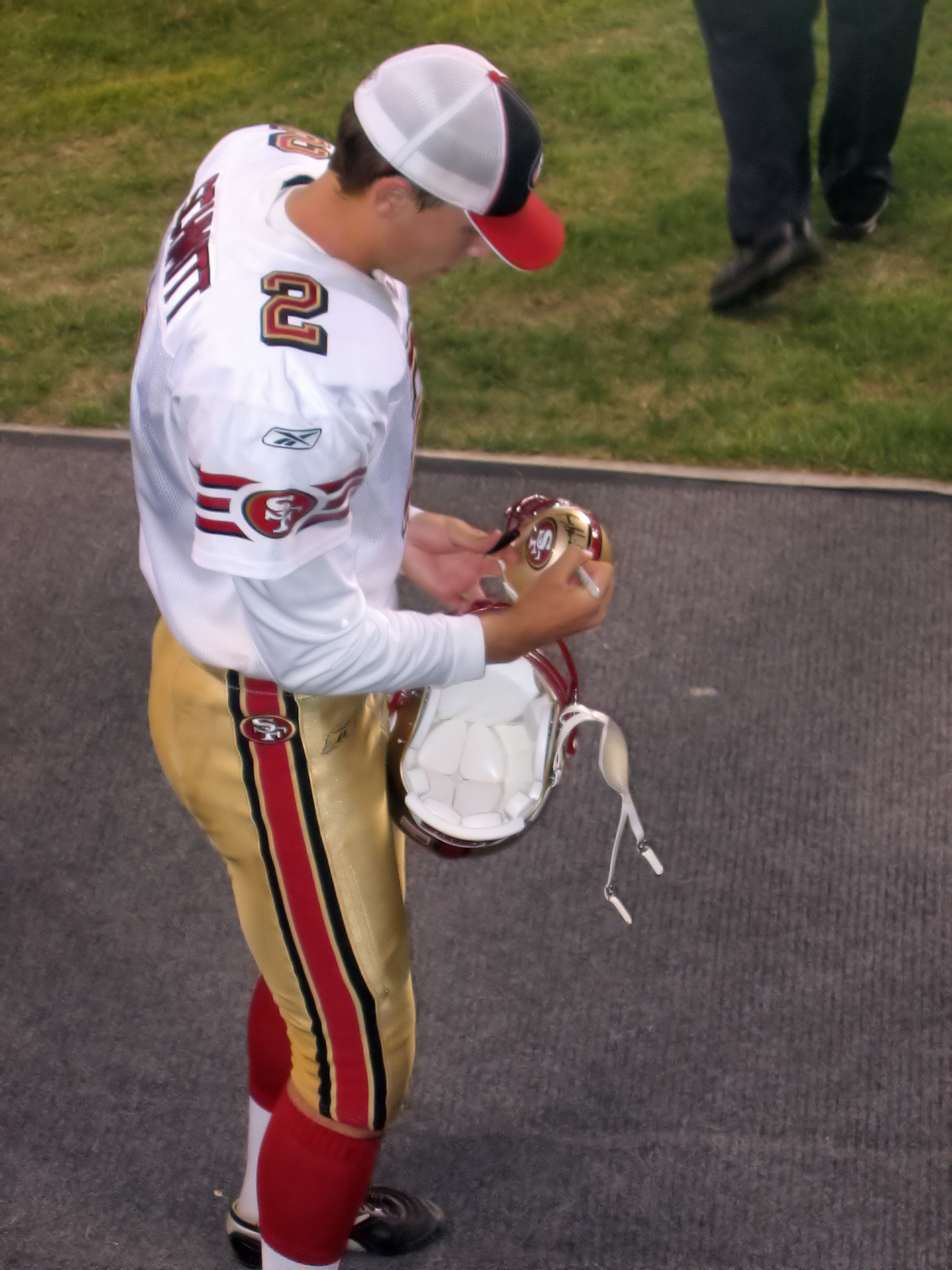
Schmitt in 2008.

Schmitt signed with the San Francisco 49ers on January 15, 2008. He was cut on August 30. During the 49ers preseason, Ricky kicked off twice with both going for touchbacks, punted 3 times for 131.1 yards, with 2 landing inside the 20 and a long of 54, for an average of 43.7 yards, and went 3 for 4 on field goals.

=== Pittsburgh Steelers ===
Schmitt was signed to the practice squad of the Pittsburgh Steelers on October 28, 2008. He was released on November 1.

=== Oakland Raiders ===
Schmitt was signed to the practice squad of the Oakland Raiders on December 15, 2008. On December 30, he signed a two-year contract with the Raiders. He was cut on September 5, 2009. During the Raiders preseason, Ricky punted 18 times for 729 yards, with 5 landing inside the 20, for an average of 40.5 yards, and went 6 for 6 on extra points.

=== Second stint with 49ers ===
Schmitt re-signed with the San Francisco 49ers on December 22, 2009. In his first regular season game against the Detroit Lions on December 27, Ricky kicked off 5 times for 325 yards with 1 touchback, for an average of 65 yards, and also went 2 for 3 on field goals (1blocked) and 2 for 2 on extra points. He was placed on injured reserve with a groin injury on January 2, 2010. On March 5, he became a free agent.

=== Tennessee Titans ===
Schmitt was signed by the Tennessee Titans on March 15, 2010. He was cut on August 31. During the Titans preseason, Ricky kicked off 3 times for 205 yards with 2 touchbacks, for an average of 68.3 yards, and punted 2 times for 110 yards, with 1 landing inside the 20 and a long of 65, for an average of 55 yards. He did not attempt any field goals or extra points.

=== San Diego Chargers ===
Schmitt was signed by the San Diego Chargers on January 20, 2011. He was cut on September 3. During the Chargers preseason, Ricky kicked off 14 times for 830 yards, with 8 touchbacks and 1 landing out of bounds, for an average of 59.3 yards, and punted 5 times for 215 yards, with 1 landing inside the 20 and a long of 50, for an average of 43 yards. He did not attempt any field goals or extra points.

=== Second stint with Cardinals ===
Schmitt re-signed with the Arizona Cardinals on May 14, 2012. He was cut on August 24. During the Cardinals preseason, Ricky kicked off 5 times for 339 yards with 2 touchbacks, for an average of 67.8 yards, and punted 12 times for 537 yards, with 3 landing inside the 20 and a long of 56, for an average of 44.8 yards. He did not attempt any field goals or extra points.

=== Saskatchewan Roughriders ===
Schmitt was signed by the Saskatchewan Roughriders on November 2, 2012. He played in the first round of the CFL playoffs. Saskatchewan lost to Calgary 36-30.

During the 2013 CFL season, Schmitt punted 136 times for 6114 yards, for an average of 45 yards. He had a long of 74.

Schmitt won the 101st Grey Cup with the Roughriders in 2013. In 2014, Schmitt became a free agent.

=== BC Lions ===
On February 20, 2014, Schmitt signed with the BC Lions After playing one season for the Lions, the option year on his contract was not picked up and he became a free agent.
