= Jock Sanders =

American gridiron football player (born 1988)

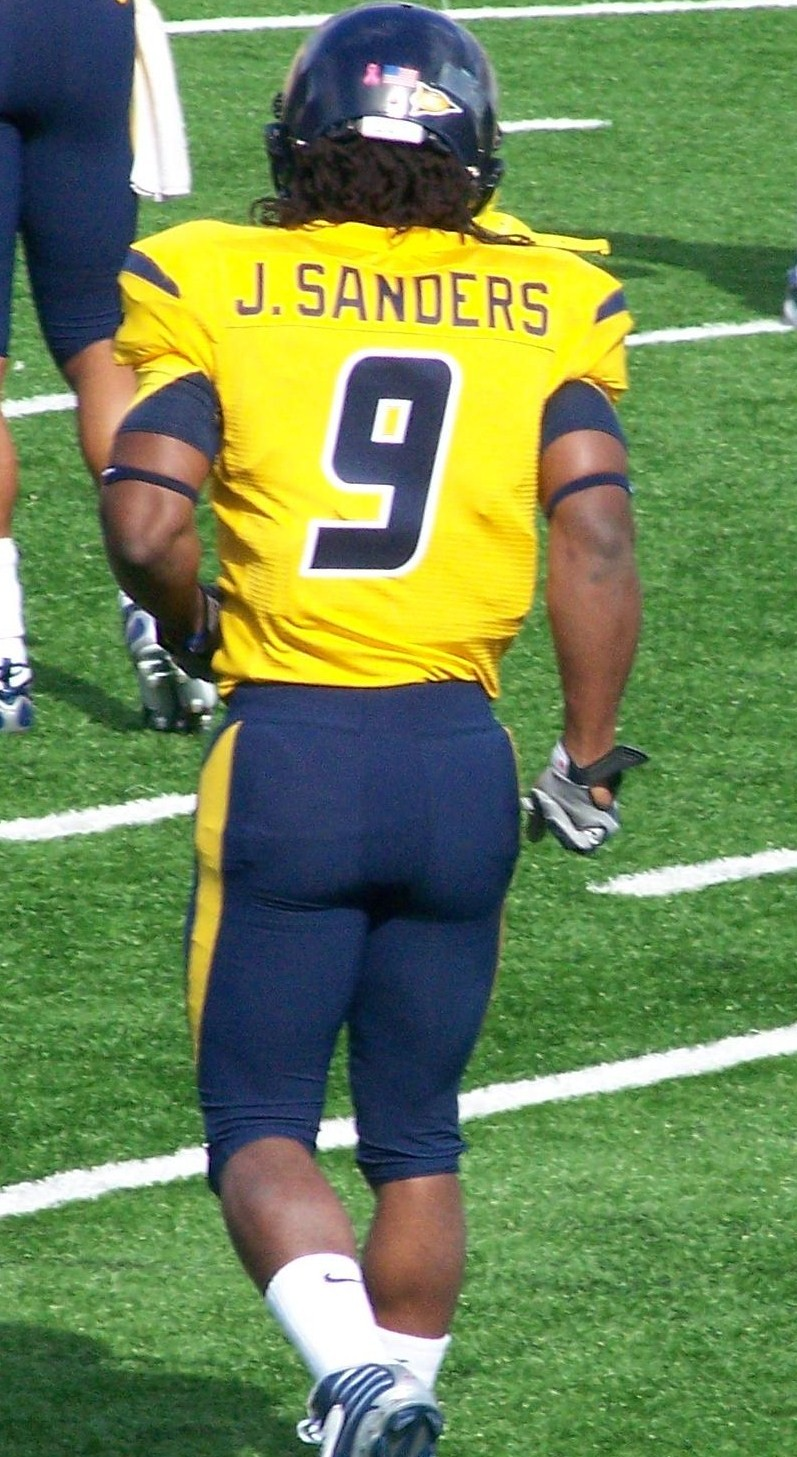
- Sanders warming up before the 2007 Mississippi State game.

No. 9
- Position: Running back

Personal information
- Born: June 14, 1988 (age 38); St. Petersburg, Florida, U.S.
- Listed height: 5 ft 6 in (1.68 m)
- Listed weight: 185 lb (84 kg)

Career information
- High school: St. Petersburg Catholic
- College: West Virginia
- NFL draft: 2011: undrafted

Career history
- Tampa Bay Buccaneers (2011)*; BC Lions (2011); Saskatchewan Roughriders (2012–2013); Calgary Stampeders (2014); Ottawa Redblacks (2015)
- * Offseason or practice squad member only

Awards and highlights
- 2× Grey Cup champion (2013, 2014); Second-team All-Big East (2010)
- Stats at Pro Football Reference
- Stats at CFL.ca (archive)

Jock Sanders (born June 14, 1988) is an American former professional football player who was a slotback and running back in the Canadian Football League (CFL). He was signed by the Tampa Bay Buccaneers as an undrafted free agent in 2011 before joining the BC Lions practice squad. He played for the Saskatchewan Roughriders for the 2012 and 2013 seasons. He signed a contract extension with the Calgary Stampeders on February 4, 2015, and was released on June 14, 2015. He played college football at West Virginia.

== Early life ==
In high school at St. Petersburg Catholic High, Sanders was a three-time all-state receiver and running back. He was named the team MVP two times in his career while rushing for 1,600 yards and 19 touchdowns as a junior and 1,200 yards and 24 touchdowns as a senior. He was also a basketball letterman.

Sanders was given three and two stars by different recruiting sites while being recruited by West Virginia University (WVU), University of Florida, Ohio State University, University of Central Florida, Bowling Green University, and University of South Florida as an athlete. Sanders eventually committed to West Virginia University after a December 2, 2006 visit.

== College career ==
=== Freshman season ===
Sanders went to West Virginia with high school legend Noel Devine in the Mountaineers' recruiting class. Sanders eventually made the team as the third-string running back behind Devine and collegiate star Steve Slaton and a slot receiver position. Sanders was listed as the second-string back for the season opener against Western Michigan University after an impressive off-season.

In the season opener against Western Michigan University, Sanders had three carries for 13 yards and a reception for 13 yards. He also had a total of 37 return yards on two returns (a punt and kickoff return). In the next game against Marshall, Sanders saw no action as Devine was the second-string runner and returner. In the third game against Maryland, Sanders got in on the last two plays of the game in which he rushed on both plays for 11 yards. Against East Carolina University the following game, Sanders totaled three rushes for 15 yards and one reception for 6 yards. He also had key blocks that sprung receiver Darius Reynaud for two touchdowns in the 48-7 win. Against Syracuse University in the 55-14 win, Sanders had two rushes for 10 yards and his first career touchdown, two receptions for 12 yards, and a kick return for 27 yards. In the 38-31 win over University of Louisville, he had two receptions for 32 yards, including a screen pass that Sanders broke for 23-yards.

In the 28-23 victory on the road against No. 22 University of Cincinnati, Sanders had a reception for 15 yards, in which he leaped into the air and pulled the ball down in the middle of the field in the redzone. In the Big East Championship-clinching 66-21 win over No. 20 University of Connecticut, Sanders rushed for 58 yards and a touchdown on only three carries, helped out by his 56-yard long.

Sanders finished his true freshman season with 12 receptions for 102 yards, an 8.5-yard average per reception. He also had 16 carries for 105 yards and two touchdowns. Sanders also had 5 total returns for 101 yards. Sanders finished the season with 308 all-purpose yards while playing in all 13 games on the year.

=== Sophomore season ===
Before the 2008 season began in February, Sanders was involved in an altercation. He and his teammate Noel Devine, along with four other West Virginia University students; participated in an off-campus attack upon two of their fellow WVU students, outside of a Morgantown bar known as Club Z.

To begin his sophomore season, Sanders totaled 62 yards on 8 receptions for two touchdowns and also had 28 yards rushing on two carries and 54 yards on two kick returns in the 48-21 victory over the Villanova Wildcats. In the following 24-3 loss to the East Carolina Pirates, he had three receptions for 20 yards and three kickoff returns for 54 yards. In the 17-14 loss to the Colorado Buffaloes, Sanders rushed seven times for 30 yards and also caught a reception for no gain.

In the 27-3 victory over Marshall University, Sanders totaled 8 receptions for 60 yards and a touchdown and rushed two times for 13 yards. In the 24-17 victory over the Rutgers Scarlet Knights, he had 4 receptions for 47 yards and a touchdown. Then in the 17-6 victory over the Syracuse University Orangemen, 4 passes for 22 yards, a touchdown, and 4 rushes for 11 yards were recorded by him. Sanders' 12-yard touchdown reception from backup Jarrett Brown was his fifth of the season - all being in home games.

In the 34-17 victory over the Auburn Tigers, Sanders rushed 6 times for 42 yards and caught 4 passes for 31 yards. Sanders finished the game with 73 total yards. Then in the 35-13 win over No. 25 Connecticut, Sanders rushed 7 times for 45 yards and two touchdowns, and caught 3 passes for 21 yards and a touchdown. He finished the road victory with 66 total yards and a career-high 3 touchdowns. In the following 26-23 overtime loss to the Cincinnati Bearcats, Sanders finished the game with 5 receptions for 52 yards, including a 30-yard reception during the 4th quarter comeback, and two rushes for -3 yards.

Sanders then followed-up the loss in the 35-21 victory over rival the Louisville Cardinals with a 25-yard touchdown reception and 3 rushes for 14 yards. In the following 19-15 Backyard Brawl loss to the Pittsburgh Panthers, Sanders had 4 rushes for 37 yards and 2 receptions for 14 yards. Sanders then finished out the regular season with 24 yards rushing and 38 yards receiving as he started at running back for the first time in his career in the 13-7 win over the South Florida Bulls. He earned second-team All-Big East honors following the regular season-ending win. In the Meineke Car Care Bowl win over the North Carolina Tar Heels, Sanders rushed 3 times for 10 yards and had 5 receptions for 70 yards.

Sanders finished his sophomore season with 250 yards on 48 carries for 2 touchdowns and a team-leading 53 receptions for 462 yards and 7 touchdowns. He also had 136 yards on 10 returns - totaling 848 all-purpose yards.

=== Junior season ===
On February 10, 2009, Sanders was arrested in Morgantown on charges of driving under the influence of alcohol. He was initially pulled over for speeding and crossing the center line, however it was found that his blood-alcohol level was 0.125, compared to the legal limit of 0.08. Head coach Bill Stewart suspended Sanders indefinitely pending the court case, because it was his second criminal incident in two years.

=== Senior season ===
With his first catch against the Pittsburgh Panthers on November 27, 2010, Sanders became the Mountaineers all-time leading receiver in catches with 192. He broke the record that was previously held by David Saunders (1995–98). In his Senior season, Mountaineer fans recognized him and WVU Running Back Noel devine as the top performers on the team.

=== Career statistics ===
WVU		Rushing					Receiving					Kickoff returns					Punt returns
Season	Games	Att	Yds	Avg	TD	Lg	Rec	Yds	Avg	TD	Lg	No	Yds	Avg	TD	Lg	No	Yds	Avg	TD	Lg
2007	13	16	105	6.6	2	56	12	102	8.5	0	23	3	58	19.3	0	27	2	43	21.5	0	23
2008	13	48	250	5.2	2	29	53	462	8.7	7	41	6	130	21.7	0	32	4	6	1.5	0	7
2009	13	35	175	5.0	1	19	72	688	9.6	3	38	1	28	28.0	0	28	17	146	8.6	0	35
2010	13	14	92	6.6	1	31	69	728	10.6	4	48	12	299	24.9	0	60	8	86	10.8	0	66
Total	52	113	622	5.5	6	56	206	1980	9.6	14	48	22	515	23.4	0	60	31	281	8.9	0	66

== Professional career ==
=== Tampa Bay Buccaneers ===
Sanders was signed by the Tampa Bay Buccaneers as an undrafted free agent on July 27, 2011. He was put off the team for underperforming.

=== BC Lions ===
On October 12, 2011, Sanders signed a practice roster agreement with the BC Lions.

=== Saskatchewan Roughriders ===
On May 23, 2012, Sanders signed a contract with the Saskatchewan Roughriders. During the 2012 CFL season, Sanders was a versatile member of the Riders, dressing for nine games. Sanders was third among the Riders in all-purpose yards (975) and fourth in yards from scrimmage (393). He had 20 carries for 165 yards, 28 receptions for 228 yards and a touchdown, 22 punt returns for 243 yards, and 16 kickoff returns for 339 yards. Sanders injured his left knee during the third quarter of Saskatchewan's 13th regular season game. He didn't return to the active roster during the 2012 CFL season. In Sanders' second season with the Riders saw increased playing time at the kick and punt return positions. He returned 35 kickoffs and 64 punts on the season and scored a touchdown in the 2013 Grey Cup Championship game which was won by the Riders. Following the 2013 CFL season, Sanders was not re-signed by the Riders.

=== Calgary Stampeders ===
On February 25, 2014, Sanders signed a contract with the Calgary Stampeders.

=== Ottawa Redblacks ===
On July 1, 2015, Sanders signed a contract with the Ottawa Redblacks. He was released on August 10, 2015.
