= Justin Goltz =

American gridiron football player (born 1987)

No. 18, 12
- Position: Quarterback

Personal information
- Born: August 23, 1987 (age 39); Walled Lake, Michigan, U.S.
- Listed height: 6 ft 5 in (1.96 m)
- Listed weight: 215 lb (98 kg)

Career information
- College: Occidental Tigers

Career history
- 2010: Sacramento Mountain Lions*
- 2010–2014: Winnipeg Blue Bombers
- 2014–2015: Edmonton Eskimos*
- * Offseason or practice squad member only
- Stats at CFL.ca (archive)

Justin Goltz (born August 23, 1987) is an American former professional football quarterback who played for the Winnipeg Blue Bombers of the Canadian Football League (CFL). He played college football at Occidental College. Goltz was also a member of the Detroit Lions, Sacramento Mountain Lions, and Edmonton Eskimos.

== Early life ==
Goltz attended Walled Lake Central High School in Walled Lake, Michigan. Goltz was a 3-sport athlete (football, baseball, basketball) at Division III Occidental College.

== Professional career ==
He attended NFL rookie mini-camp with the Detroit Lions in 2009, but was not signed to a contract. Goltz was drafted 3rd overall in the 2010 UFL draft by Dennis Green and the Sacramento Mountain Lions. He signed with the Winnipeg Blue Bombers in October 2010. On July 26, 2013, he played his first game as starting quarterback, following an injury to Buck Pierce.

In 2013, Goltz was criticized for his touchdown celebrations in a game against Saskatchewan Roughriders. He later gave a public statement that he will not celebrate touchdowns.

Goltz has previously done TV ads, including a Snickers commercial with Robin Williams. He worked as a sales engineer at Blast Motion, which manufactures swing-tracking sensors.

In August 2019, Hawk-Eye hired Goltz to collaborate with MLB and the NFL. For MLB, Hawk-Eye provides technology for automated balls and strike system; for the NFL, Hawk-Eye's technology is used for definitive angles during instant replay reviews.

== Personal life ==
His wife, Meri-De, is former professional beach and indoor volleyball player.
