= Eddie Russ =

American gridiron football player (born 1987)

Profile
- Position: Defensive back

Personal information
- Born: March 24, 1987 (age 39); Marianna, Florida, U.S.
- Listed height: 6 ft 0 in (1.83 m)
- Listed weight: 185 lb (84 kg)

Career information
- High school: Cottondale (Cottondale, Florida)
- College: Harding

Career history
- 2007–2008: Antelope Valley College
- 2009–2010: Harding
- 2011–2013: Saskatchewan Roughriders

Eddie Russ Jr. (born March 24, 1987) is an American former professional football defensive back who played for the Saskatchewan Roughriders of the Canadian Football League (CFL). He started 21 games and made 53 tackles, 11 pass deflections and one interception in his career.
