= Diamond Ferri =

American gridiron football player (born 1981)

No. 22
- Positions: Linebacker, defensive back, running back

Personal information
- Born: August 6, 1981 (age 45); Medford, Massachusetts, U.S.
- Listed height: 5 ft 11 in (1.80 m)
- Listed weight: 223 lb (101 kg)

Career information
- High school: Everett (MA)
- College: Syracuse

Career history
- 2005: New York Giants*
- 2005: Atlanta Falcons*
- 2006: Amsterdam Admirals
- 2006: Toronto Argonauts
- 2006: Lowell NorEaster
- 2006: Arizona Cardinals
- 2007–2011: Montreal Alouettes
- 2012–2013: Saskatchewan Roughriders
- 2014: Montreal Alouettes
- 2014: Saskatchewan Roughriders
- * Offseason or practice squad member only

Awards and highlights
- 3× Grey Cup champion (2009, 2010, 2013)
- Stats at Pro Football Reference

Diamond M. Ferri (born August 6, 1981) is an American former professional football player who played in the Canadian Football League (CFL) and National Football League (NFL). He played college football at Syracuse University.

== College career ==
In four years at Syracuse University he had 140 tackles, six interceptions, seven tackles for losses, one sack, six forced fumbles and five recovered fumbles. As a running back he carried the ball 88 times for 429 yards and four touchdowns.

Ferri displayed one of the most impressive two-way performances of the modern football era, playing for Syracuse on offense at running back and on defense at safety in a victory against Boston College during the final game of 2004. Playing on nearly every down, he ran the ball 28 times for 141 yards and two touchdowns on offense, and sealed the upset victory with an interception return for a touchdown late in the game.

== Professional career ==
He signed with the New York Giants as an undrafted free agent before the 2005 season and in December, joined the Atlanta Falcons. After being allocated by the Falcons, he played in NFL Europa. He temporarily joined the Toronto Argonauts’ developmental roster. After being release from the Argonauts he played one game for the Lowell NorEaster New England Football League had 8 carries for 88 yards and a touchdown versus the Medford Mustangs. Also played three games with the Arizona Cardinals, registering one tackle.

He signed with the Montreal Alouettes in May of 2007. On September 12, 2007, the Alouettes confirmed Ferri was suffering from acute pancreatitis. He was released by the Alouettes on June 15, 2012 ...Winning the 2009 and 2010 Grey cup with Montreal....

On August 29, 2012, he signed with the Saskatchewan Roughriders. Ferri would eventually win the 101st Grey Cup with the Roughriders in 2013. On February 10, 2014, Ferri was released by the Roughriders. On February 12, 2014, Ferri was signed by the Montreal Alouettes and was released after training camp. He was signed to the Saskatchewan Roughriders' practice roster on October 9, 2014.
