= Dan Clark (Canadian football) =

Canadian football player from Saskatchewan

No. 77
- Position: Offensive lineman

Personal information
- Born: June 1, 1988 (age 38); Regina, Saskatchewan, Canada
- Listed height: 6 ft 4 in (1.93 m)
- Listed weight: 330 lb (150 kg)

Career information
- CJFL: Regina Thunder
- CFL draft: 2010

Career history
- 2009–2022: Saskatchewan Roughriders

Awards and highlights
- Grey Cup champion (2013); CFL All-Star (2019); CFL West All-Star (2019)
- Stats at CFL.ca

Dan Clark (born June 1, 1988) is a Canadian former professional football offensive lineman who played for the Saskatchewan Roughriders of the Canadian Football League (CFL) from 2009 to 2022.

== Career ==
He was signed by the Roughriders in June, 2009 and spent time on the practice roster during the 2009 and 2010 seasons while playing junior football. He played junior football for the Regina Thunder of the Canadian Junior Football League.

In 2019, he was the unanimous selection for Saskatchewan Roughriders Most Outstanding Offensive Lineman. He was also named a CFL All-Star. Clark signed a contract extension with the Roughriders through the 2022 season on December 23, 2020. Clark suffered a broken fibula on June 18, 2022. He had successful surgery shortly thereafter and was expected to miss the remainder of the season. On February 14, 2023, Clark became a free agent. The following day, after signing two Canadian offensive linemen (Peter Godber and Philip Blake) the Riders general manager Jeremy O’Day said it was "highly unlikely" that Clark would return to Saskatchewan for an eleventh season. He played in 131 games for the Roughriders over 10 seasons.

== Personal life ==
He resides in Regina, Saskatchewan during the off season with his wife, daughter and son.
