= Tristan Jackson =

American gridiron football player (born 1986)

No. 38
- Position: Defensive back

Personal information
- Born: March 5, 1986 (age 40); Beaumont, Mississippi, U.S.
- Listed height: 5 ft 8 in (1.73 m)
- Listed weight: 185 lb (84 kg)

Career information
- High school: Perry Central
- College: Central Arkansas
- NFL draft: 2008: undrafted

Career history
- 2008–2010: Edmonton Eskimos
- 2011–2015: Saskatchewan Roughriders
- 2016: Ottawa Redblacks

Awards and highlights
- 2× Grey Cup champion (2013, 2016); 2× Eskimos' Most Outstanding Special Teams Player (2008, 2009); Eskimos' Most Outstanding Rookie (2008); Eskimos record most kickoff return yards – season (1,167) - 2009
- Stats at CFL.ca

Tristan Jackson (born March 5, 1986) is an American former professional football defensive back who played nine seasons in the Canadian Football League. He was signed as a street free agent by the Edmonton Eskimos in 2008 where he played for three seasons before being traded to the Saskatchewan Roughriders. He played college football for the Central Arkansas Bears.

In a 2012 game against the BC Lions, Jackson returned a missed field goal deep in his own end zone for a 129-yard touchdown.

When I caught it, I was going to take a knee, but I seen two guys outside, and we had two guys, I always believe in my guys up front.

— Jackson on the touchdown
