= Banjo Bowl =

Annual Canadian Football League rematch game

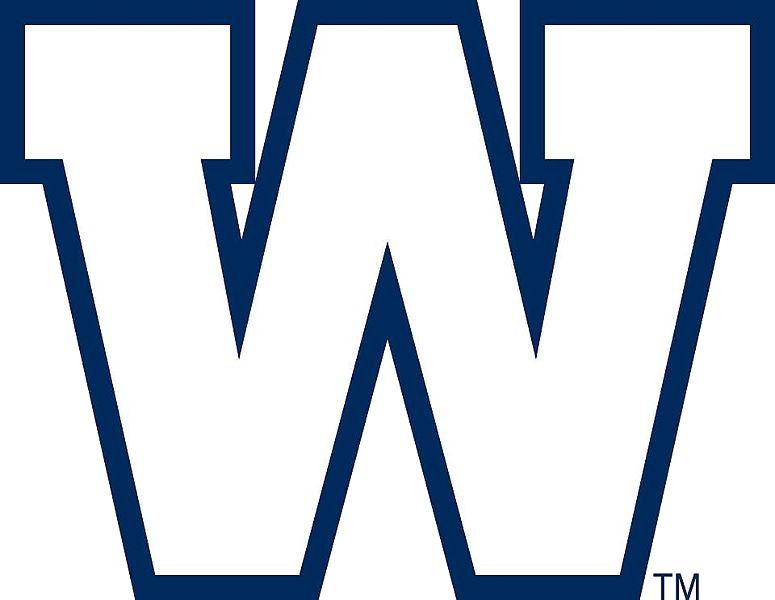
- Saskatchewan Roughriders Winnipeg Blue Bombers
- First meeting: September 12, 2004; Blue Bombers 27, Roughriders 24
- Latest meeting: September 12, 2026; Blue Bombers 19, Roughriders 6

Statistics
- Total meetings: 22
- All-time series: Blue Bombers lead, 14–8
- Largest victory: Roughriders: 55–10 (2009); Blue Bombers: 51–6 (2023)
- Smallest victory: Roughriders: 25–24 (2012); Blue Bombers: 27–24 (2004)
- Longest win streak: Blue Bombers: 5 (2019–2024)
- Current win streak: Blue Bombers: 1 (2026–present)

The Banjo Bowl is the annual rematch game between the Winnipeg Blue Bombers and Saskatchewan Roughriders of the Canadian Football League (CFL) after the Labour Day Classic. While the traditional Labour Day Classic game is always played on the Sunday before Labour Day at Mosaic Stadium in Regina, Saskatchewan (previously held at Taylor Field), there is usually a rematch on the following weekend between these two rival prairie teams at Princess Auto Stadium (previously held at Canad Inns Stadium) in Winnipeg, Manitoba.

== History ==
From 1982 to 2003 consecutively, Saskatchewan hosted Winnipeg in the Labour Day Classic. This game was always held in Regina on the Sunday before Labour Day Monday. Some of these Labour Day Classic games were part of a home-and-home series. In 1984 and 1988, Winnipeg hosted Saskatchewan in the game before the Labour Day Classic. In 1986, 1991 to 1995, and 1998, Winnipeg hosted Saskatchewan in the game after the Labour Day Classic.

Dave Ritchie, Winnipeg's head coach from 1999 to 2004, would ask, "Why can’t we play [the Labour Day Classic] game in Winnipeg once in awhile?" Ritchie knew the visitors should have a clear disadvantage playing in a jacked-up, jam-packed stadium, and felt that Winnipeg should benefit once in a while. At one time, there were discussions about occasionally letting Winnipeg enjoy the home-field advantage and perhaps alternating year by year the site of the Labour Day Classic. Every year starting in 2004, Saskatchewan has hosted the Labour Day Classic and Winnipeg has hosted the Labour Day Rematch. As of the 2026 season, Winnipeg leads the series 14–8.

As on Labour Day weekend when many Winnipeg fans visit Regina to support the Bombers, many Saskatchewan fans visit Winnipeg the following weekend to support the Roughriders. Many come, tongue-in-cheek, with banjos.

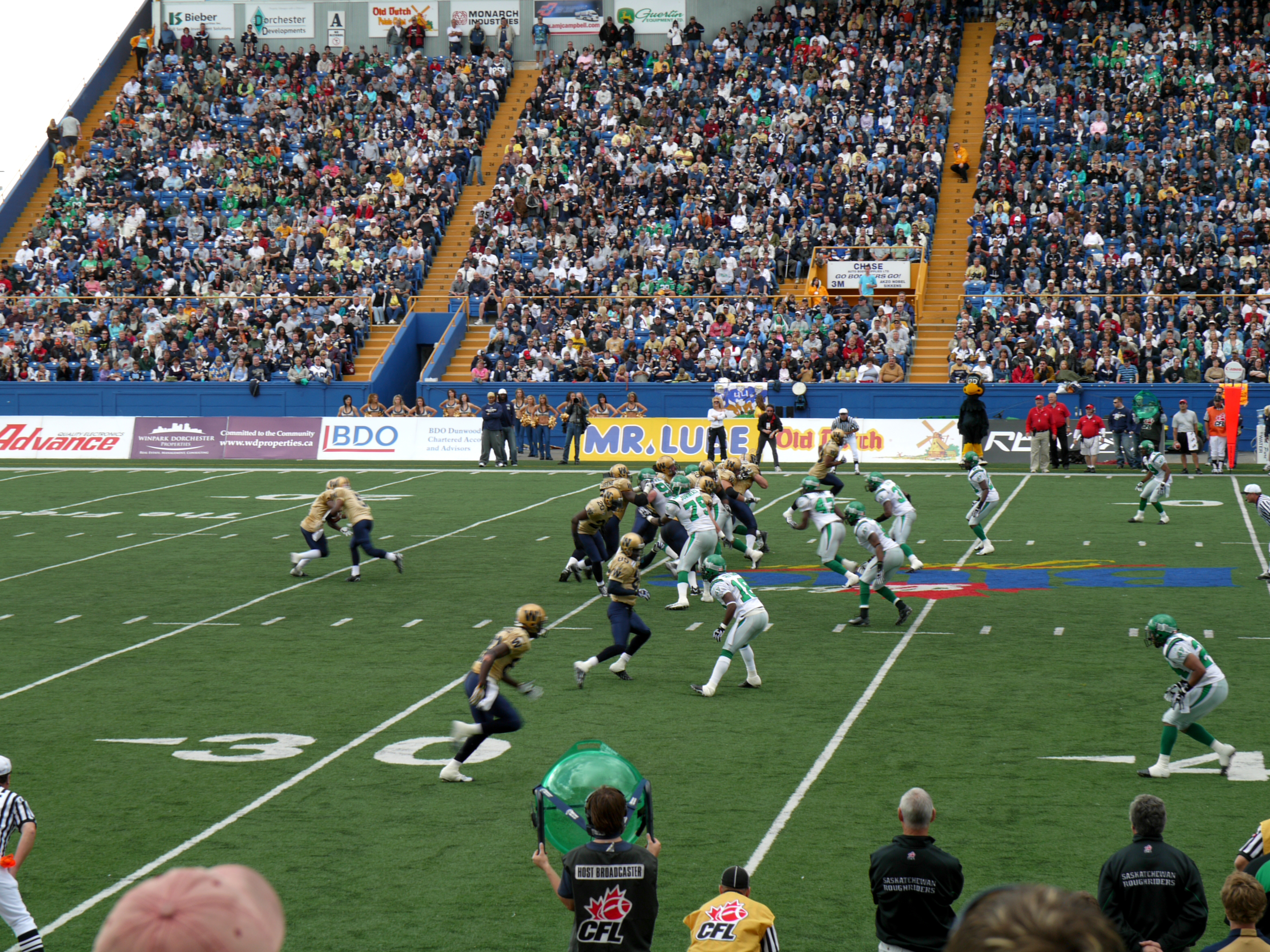
The Winnipeg Blue Bombers hosted the Saskatchewan Roughriders in the 2007 Banjo Bowl.

Despite not being an official event, the Canadian Football League website promotes the game by referring to it as "Banjo Bowl" in some of its online coverage as does the league's official television broadcaster, TSN. In 2013, the Premier of Saskatchewan, Brad Wall, joined in the spirit of the event by posting a video on his YouTube channel making reference to the rivalry and the Banjo Bowl game. The Roughriders themselves have avoided the use of the title "Banjo Bowl" in official communications, referring to the game as the "Labour Day rematch".

=== Name ===
The "Banjo Bowl" moniker was coined by Blue Bombers board member David Asper in early 2004, inspired by an infamous comment made by Bombers placekicker Troy Westwood in the week prior to a 2003 Western Division Semi-final game between the two teams. Westwood was quoted in the media as saying that people from Regina were "a bunch of banjo-pickin' inbreds", which was a reference to the scene and song "Dueling Banjos" from the movie Deliverance. He later sardonically apologized for those comments, saying that "the vast majority of the people in Saskatchewan have no idea how to play the banjo." This further fuelled the Winnipeg–Saskatchewan football rivalry and has made the rematch game even more of an event. The game has been sold out every year since 2005.

== Results ==
Year	Date	Winner	Score	Venue	Attendance	TV	Roughriders QB	Blue Bombers QB
2004	September 12	Blue Bombers	27–24	Canad Inns Stadium	27,160	Sportsnet	Henry Burris	Kevin Glenn
2005	September 10	Roughriders	19–17	Canad Inns Stadium	29,653	CBC	Marcus Crandell	Kevin Glenn
2006	September 10	Blue Bombers	27–23	Canad Inns Stadium	30,026	TSN	Kerry Joseph	Kevin Glenn
2007	September 9	Blue Bombers	34–15	Canad Inns Stadium	29,783	TSN	Kerry Joseph	Kevin Glenn
2008	September 7	Roughriders	34–31	Canad Inns Stadium	29,770	TSN	Michael Bishop	Kevin Glenn
2009	September 13	Roughriders	55–10	Canad Inns Stadium	29,533	TSN	Darian Durant	Michael Bishop
2010	September 12	Blue Bombers	31–2	Canad Inns Stadium	29,533	TSN	Darian Durant	Steven Jyles
2011	September 11	Roughriders	45–23	Canad Inns Stadium	30,518	TSN	Darian Durant	Buck Pierce
2012	September 9	Roughriders	25–24	Canad Inns Stadium	30,077	TSN	Darian Durant	Joey Elliott
2013	September 8	Blue Bombers	25–13	Investors Group Field	33,500	TSN	Darian Durant	Justin Goltz
2014	September 7	Roughriders	30–24	Investors Group Field	33,234	TSN	Darian Durant	Drew Willy
2015	September 12	Blue Bombers	22–7	Investors Group Field	35,156	TSN	Brett Smith	Matt Nichols
2016	September 10	Blue Bombers	17–10	Investors Group Field	33,234	TSN	Darian Durant	Matt Nichols
2017	September 9	Blue Bombers	48–28	Investors Group Field	33,134	TSN	Kevin Glenn	Matt Nichols
2018	September 8	Roughriders	32–27	Investors Group Field	33,134	TSN	Zach Collaros	Matt Nichols
2019	September 7	Blue Bombers	35–10	IG Field	33,134	TSN	Cody Fajardo	Chris Streveler
2020	Not played due to COVID-19							
2021	September 11	Blue Bombers	33–9	IG Field	33,234	TSN	Cody Fajardo	Zach Collaros
2022	September 10	Blue Bombers	54–20	IG Field	33,234	TSN	Cody Fajardo	Zach Collaros
2023	September 9	Blue Bombers	51–6	IG Field	32,343	TSN	Jake Dolegala	Zach Collaros
2024	September 7	Blue Bombers	26–21	Princess Auto Stadium	32,343	CTV	Trevor Harris	Zach Collaros
2025	September 6	Roughriders	21–13	Princess Auto Stadium	32,343	TSN	Trevor Harris	Zach Collaros
2026	September 12	Blue Bombers	19–6	Princess Auto Stadium	32,343	TSN/CTV	Trevor Harris	Zach Collaros
