= 101st Grey Cup =

2013 Canadian Football championship game

Hamilton Tiger-Cats	Saskatchewan Roughriders
(10–8)	(11–7)
23	45
Head coach: Kent Austin	Head coach: Corey Chamblin
	1	2	3	4	Total
Hamilton Tiger-Cats	3	3	7	10	23
Saskatchewan Roughriders	7	24	0	14	45
- Date: November 24, 2013
- Stadium: Mosaic Stadium at Taylor Field
- Location: Regina
- Most Valuable Player: Kory Sheets, RB (Roughriders)
- Most Valuable Canadian: Chris Getzlaf, SB (Roughriders)
- Favourite: Roughriders by 6
- National anthem: Serena Ryder
- Coin toss: Vaughn Solomon Schofield
- Referee: Kim Murphy
- Halftime show: Hedley
- Attendance: 44,710

Broadcasters
- Network: (Canada) TSN, RDS; (United States) NBCSN
- Announcers: (TSN): Chris Cuthbert, Glen Suitor, Dave Randorf, Jock Climie, Matt Dunigan, Chris Schultz, Milt Stegall, Paul LaPolice; (RDS): Denis Casavant, Pierre Vercheval, Marc Labrecque, Mike Sutherland, Claude Mailhot
- Ratings: 4.5 million (average); 11.5 million (total)

The 101st Grey Cup was a Canadian football game played between the East Division champion Hamilton Tiger-Cats and the West Division champion Saskatchewan Roughriders of the Canadian Football League to decide the Grey Cup champions of the 2013 season.

The game took place on November 24, 2013, at Mosaic Stadium at Taylor Field in Regina, Saskatchewan. It was the third Grey Cup game to be hosted in Regina following the 83rd and 91st editions of the game. The Roughriders won their fourth championship 45–23 against the Tiger-Cats. The game took place on artificial turf, and Mosaic Stadium added temporary seating to bring the total seating capacity to just under 45,000.

Kick-off occurred at 5:30 p.m. CST (6:30 p.m. EST; 3:30 p.m. PST), while the pre-game started at noon CST (1 p.m. EST; 10 a.m. PST).

This was the third consecutive year that the Grey Cup involved a team from the host city, following the BC Lions in the 99th Grey Cup and the Toronto Argonauts in the 100th, with all three games seeing the host win. This was also the fourth time that the Roughriders and Tiger-Cats met in the Grey Cup final, having previously met in the 55th, 60th, and 77th editions of the game. The Roughriders became the second western-based CFL team to win the Grey Cup at their home stadium.

Roughriders running back Kory Sheets was named the Most Valuable Player after setting a Grey Cup record by rushing for 197 yards and scoring two touchdowns. Slotback Chris Getzlaf, also of the Roughriders, was awarded the Dick Suderman Trophy as the Most Valuable Canadian.

== Host city ==
On September 29, 2011, news agencies reported that the game would be awarded to Regina, Saskatchewan. On October 13, 2011, the Canadian Football League officially said that the city of Regina would host the game. It was the third time that Regina hosted the event, following the 1995 and 2003 games.

The Saskatchewan Roughriders announced on February 24, 2012, that Mosaic Stadium would undergo renovations and upgrades to increase capacity to host the Grey Cup. The team spent $14 million to increase seating capacity to approximately 45,000 by adding temporary seats in the end zones. Corporate boxes, concessions and washroom facilities were also added to accommodate the increased number of fans at the stadium. A new 18-metre-wide (60 ft) digital LED screen and scoreboard was installed in the northeast end zone while another new 17-metre-wide (55 ft) digital LED screen and scoreboard was attached to the west grandstand.

The Grey Cup Committee announced the details of the 101st Grey Cup on November 29, 2012.

== Festivities ==
Numerous festivities within Regina and throughout Saskatchewan were held as part of the Grey Cup celebrations. The festivities were officially named the "Celebration in Rider Nation" by the host Roughriders. The 101st Grey Cup Festival opened on Wednesday with its opening ceremonies and ran up until kick-off, while including such traditional events as the Grey Cup parade on Saturday and the team-based parties on Friday. The festival also featured concerts by several popular Canadian bands, including the Barenaked Ladies and Hedley, who performed during the game at halftime.

Elsewhere in the province, organizers held a Riderville North celebration in Saskatoon. Aside from a viewing party of the game, the event also featured interactive games, tributes to the Riders and musical performances, including one by The Sheepdogs the night before the game.

== Path to the Grey Cup ==
=== Hamilton Tiger-Cats ===
The Hamilton Tiger-Cats played the season at Alumni Stadium in Guelph, Ontario due to the demolition of their home stadium, Ivor Wynne Stadium, and the building of its replacement, Tim Hortons Field. They finished the season with a record of 10–8 and finished second in the East Division.

In the playoffs, they defeated Montreal 19–16 in the East semi-final, then travelled to Toronto where they won the East final, 36–24.

=== Saskatchewan Roughriders ===
The Saskatchewan Roughriders had an 11–7 record, which placed them second in the West Division.

In the playoffs, they defeated BC 29–25 in the West semi-final, then travelled to Calgary where they won the West final, 35–13.

=== Head-to-head ===
Hamilton and Saskatchewan met twice during the regular season with the Roughriders winning both games. The first meeting between the two was in Regina on July 21, with the Riders dominating the Tiger-Cats in a 37–0 win. The following week, July 27, the two teams met again in a rematch, this time with the Tiger-Cats as the home team. The Riders would win that game as well, with a final score of 32–20.

== Game summary ==
As the designated visiting team, Hamilton called heads for the coin toss. With the toss turning up tails, Saskatchewan deferred their choice to the second half. Hamilton chose to receive the ball to open the game and Saskatchewan chose to defend the south end zone, giving Hamilton the notable wind at their backs and the ball to open the game.

Hamilton head coach Kent Austin did not use the scramble offence at all in the Grey Cup game. The Tiger-Cats had used the scramble offence with great results in their two East Division playoff games. Sometimes it had been with backup quarterback Dan LeFevour, and occasionally number three quarterback Jeremiah Masoli, rather than starter Henry Burris.

Saskatchewan quarterback Darian Durant started the game off poorly, fumbling the ball twice during Saskatchewan's first two offensive drives of the game, with the first being self-recovered and the second being caught by Saskatchewan running back Kory Sheets and carried for a 39-yard gain. Hamilton opened the scoring early in the first with a field goal by Luca Congi, but Saskatchewan quickly responded with a touchdown pass from Durant to Geroy Simon to make it 7–3 for the Roughriders at the end of the first.

Saskatchewan opened the second quarter with a field goal to make it 10–3, and Saskatchewan running back Jock Sanders scored a touchdown to put the Roughriders up 17–3. Following a turnover by Hamilton quarterback Henry Burris, who missed a snap and allowed the football to shoot past him, Sheets scored his first touchdown for Saskatchewan to extend their lead to 24–3. While Hamilton scored another field goal before the end of the quarter, a 42-yard pass from Durant to Simon at the end of the quarter put the Riders up 31–6 at half-time. The 24-point performance by the Saskatchewan offence ranks as one of the best single-quarter performances in Grey Cup history.

The third quarter opened with neither team able to sustain a meaningful drive until near the end of the quarter, when Burris ran the ball 18 yards for Hamilton's first touchdown of the game. That turned out to be the only score of the quarter, although Hamilton scored a field goal in the first play of the fourth quarter to make it 31–16 for the Roughriders with fifteen minutes left to play. However, Hamilton was unable to translate its momentum into another touchdown, and with five minutes remaining in the game Kory Sheets scored another touchdown for the Roughriders to extend the Riders' lead to 38–16. Saskatchewan forced a turnover on the following Tiger-Cats' possession which quickly led to a touchdown by Weston Dressler to make the score 45–16. The Tiger-Cats closed the scoring with a touchdown by C.J. Gable, but it proved to be too little as the Roughriders allowed the clock to run down and won the game with a final score of 45–23.

=== Scoring summary ===
==== First Quarter ====
HAM – FG Congi 45 (9:44) 3–0 HAM
SSK – TD Simon 15 yd pass from Durant (Milo convert) (6:59) 7–3 SSK

==== Second Quarter ====
SSK – FG Milo 20 (12:46) 10–3 SSK
SSK – TD Sanders 3 yd running (Milo convert) (9:00) 17–3 SSK
SSK – TD Sheets 1 yd running (Milo convert) (5:31) 24–3 SSK
HAM – FG Congi 24 (2:47) 24–6 SSK
SSK – TD Simon 42 yd pass from Durant (Milo convert) (1:56) 31–6 SSK

==== Third Quarter ====
HAM – TD Burris 18 yd running (Congi convert) (2:52) 31–13 SSK

==== Fourth Quarter ====
HAM – FG Congi 33 (14:48) 31–16 SSK
SSK – TD Sheets 4 yd running (Milo convert) (5:23) 38–16 SSK
SSK – TD Dressler 26 yd pass from Durant (Milo convert) (4:09) 45–16 SSK
HAM – TD Gable 2 yd running (Congi convert) (1:56) 45–23 SSK

== Musical acts ==
Like the 100th edition, the 101st Grey Cup featured an all-star lineup of Canadian musical acts. The opening ceremonies of the game were marked by a performance by the Saskatoon-based group The Sheepdogs, who played two songs, while the national anthem was performed by Ontarian singer Serena Ryder. The half-time show was sponsored by SiriusXM and featured the rock band Hedley in a 13-minute compilation performance of Hands Up, Anything, Invincible and Cha-Ching, which included several stunts by a performer on a snowmobile.

== Television and radio ==
In Canada, the English broadcast was presented on TSN, while the French language broadcast was handled by its sister station, broadcast in Canada by RDS. In the United States, the game was broadcast on the NBC Sports Network (NBCSN, simulcasting the TSN feed).

On the radio, the game was covered by TSN Radio, AM900 CHML, CKRM and SiriusXM.

Overall, the game was seen by 11.5 million viewers, or approximately 1 in 3 Canadians, with an average viewership of 4.5 million.

== Celebration ==
In the immediate aftermath of the game, thousands of fans poured into the streets of Regina to celebrate. The Saskatchewan Roughriders held a Grey Cup parade on November 26 that started from Mosaic Stadium, travelled south down Albert Street, and ended at the Legislative Building, where a short ceremony occurred.
