= 2015 Ottawa Redblacks season =

Canadian football team season

- General manager: Marcel Desjardins
- Head coach: Rick Campbell
- Home stadium: TD Place Stadium

Results
- Record: 12–6
- Division place: 1st, East
- Playoffs: Lost Grey Cup
- Team MOP: Henry Burris
- Team MOC: Brad Sinopoli
- Team MOR: Forrest Hightower

Uniform

The 2015 Ottawa Redblacks season was the second season for the team in the Canadian Football League (CFL). The Redblacks improved upon their unimpressive 2–16 record from 2014 after just five games when they collected their third win in week five against the Calgary Stampeders. Ottawa clinched a playoff berth in week 17 with a victory over the Winnipeg Blue Bombers on October 16, 2015. The Redblacks became the first Ottawa-based CFL team to have a winning record since 1979. They were also the first Ottawa-based CFL team to finish first in East Division since the 1978 Rough Riders and the first Ottawa-based team ever to finish with at least 12 regular season wins.

The Redblacks posted the fifth best winning percentage posted by a second year expansion team in any established North American professional sports league after the 1951 Cleveland Browns, the 1995 Baltimore Stallions, the 1996 Carolina Panthers and the 1997 Montreal Alouettes – although of those four teams, only the Stallions and Panthers were expansion teams in the same sense as the Redblacks and only the Panthers had a losing record in their inaugural season.

On November 22, 2015, the Redblacks defeated the Hamilton Tiger-Cats 35–28 in the Eastern Final to advance to their first Grey Cup game, which they lost 26–20 to the Edmonton Eskimos. It was the first time that an Ottawa CFL team advanced to the Grey Cup game since the 1981 Ottawa Rough Riders.

== Off-season ==
=== Trades ===
On January 15, 2015, the Redblacks traded Jasper Simmons and Dan Buckner to the Calgary Stampeders in exchange for Maurice Price. Ottawa is hoping that Price can provide the offense with some explosiveness which the team lacked during its inaugural season.

=== Free agency ===
Within the first two days of the start of the free agency period, the Redblacks made four substantial acquisitions. On February 10, 2015, the Redblacks signed Ernest Jackson from the BC Lions to a two-year, $270,000 deal. The next day Ottawa announced they had signed Greg Ellingson (from the Tiger-Cats), SirVincent Rogers (from the Argonauts), and former Ottawa Gee-Gees quarterback and current wide receiver Brad Sinopoli (from the Stampeders). On April 21, 2015, the Redblacks announced they had signed wide receiver Chris Williams. Williams had a very productive two seasons with the Ti-Cats accumulating 153 receptions for 2,362 receiving yards 17 receiving touchdowns, 1,198 punt return yards and five punt returns for touchdowns.

=== CFL draft ===
The 2015 CFL draft took place on May 12, 2015. The Redblacks had six selections in the seven-round draft, including the first overall pick where they selected Ottawa native Alex Mateas. The club traded their third-round pick to Calgary for Justin Phillips.

Round	Pick	Player	Position	School/Club team
1	1	Alex Mateas	OL	UConn
2	10	Jake Harty	WR	Calgary
4	28	Tanner Doll	LS	Calgary
5	37	Jefferson Court	FB	Utah State
6	45	Kienan Lafrance	RB	Manitoba
7	54	Alexandre Leganiere	OL	Montreal

=== Training camp ===
The Redblacks conducted their spring mini-camp at TD Place Stadium on April 27–29. Rookies reported to training camp on May 27, with veterans following a few days later on May 31. Training camp was held at Keith Harris Stadium on the campus of Carleton University.

== Preseason ==
Due to the 2015 FIFA Women's World Cup taking place in June at TD Place Stadium, the Redblacks played their home pre-season game at Telus Stadium in Quebec City, Quebec on the campus of the Université Laval. It was the second game that an Ottawa CFL franchise played in Quebec City, with the first being in 2003, and the second consecutive year that the Redblacks played their home pre-season game away from Ottawa.

Week	Date	Kickoff	Opponent	Results		TV	Venue	Attendance	Summary
Week	Date	Kickoff	Opponent	Score	Record	TV	Venue	Attendance	Summary
A	Mon, June 8	7:30 p.m. EDT	at Hamilton Tiger-Cats	L 10–37	0–1	None	Tim Hortons Field	N/A	Recap
B	Sat, June 13	7:30 p.m. EDT	vs. Montreal Alouettes	L 9–26	0–2	RDS	Telus Stadium (in Quebec City)	4,778	Recap
C	Bye								

# Games played with colour uniforms.

== Regular season ==
=== Standings ===
East Division
Team	GP	W	L	PF	PA	Pts	
Ottawa Redblacks	18	12	6	464	454	24	Details
Hamilton Tiger-Cats	18	10	8	530	391	20	Details
Toronto Argonauts	18	10	8	438	499	20	Details
Montreal Alouettes	18	6	12	388	402	12	Details

=== Schedule ===
Week	Date	Kickoff	Opponent	Results		TV	Venue	Attendance	Summary
Week	Date	Kickoff	Opponent	Score	Record	TV	Venue	Attendance	Summary
1	Thurs, June 25	7:30 p.m. EDT	at Montreal Alouettes	W 20–16	1–0	TSN/RDS/ESPN2	Molson Stadium	21,524	Recap
2	Sat, July 4	6:00 p.m. EDT	vs. BC Lions	W 27–16	2–0	TSN/RDS2	TD Place Stadium	24,376	Recap
3	Thurs, July 9	9:00 p.m. EDT	at Edmonton Eskimos	L 17–46	2–1	TSN/RDS2/ESPN2	Commonwealth Stadium	29,904	Recap
4	Fri, July 17	7:00 p.m. EDT	vs. Edmonton Eskimos	L 12–23	2–2	TSN/RDS	TD Place Stadium	21,078	Recap
5	Fri, July 24	7:00 p.m. EDT	vs. Calgary Stampeders	W 29–26 (OT)	3–2	TSN/RDS	TD Place Stadium	23,018	Recap
6	Bye								
7	Fri, Aug 7	7:30 p.m. EDT	vs. Montreal Alouettes	W 26–23	4–2	TSN/RDS/ESPN2	TD Place Stadium	24,427	Recap
8	Sat, Aug 15	10:00 p.m. EDT	at Calgary Stampeders	L 3–48	4–3	TSN/RDS/ESPN2	McMahon Stadium	27,566	Recap
9	Sun, Aug 23	4:00 p.m. EDT	at Toronto Argonauts	L 24–30	4–4	TSN	Rogers Centre	14,748	Recap
10	Sun, Aug 30	4:00 p.m. EDT	vs. Saskatchewan Roughriders	W 35–13	5–4	TSN/RDS2/ESPN2	TD Place Stadium	24,468	Recap
11	Bye								
12	Sun, Sept 13	4:00 p.m. EDT	at BC Lions	W 31–18	6–4	TSN	BC Place	19,833	Recap
13	Sat, Sept 19	9:00 p.m. EDT	at Saskatchewan Roughriders	W 30–27	7–4	TSN/RDS2	Mosaic Stadium	30,480	Recap
14	Sat, Sept 26	7:00 p.m. EDT	vs. Toronto Argonauts	L 26–35	7–5	TSN/RDS2	TD Place Stadium	24,586	Recap
15	Thurs, Oct 1	7:30 p.m. EDT	vs. Montreal Alouettes	W 39–17	8–5	TSN/RDS	TD Place Stadium	21,607	Recap
16	Tues, Oct 6	7:30 p.m. EDT	at Toronto Argonauts	L 35–38	8–6	TSN/RDS2	TD Place Stadium	15,011	Recap
17	Fri, Oct 16	7:30 p.m. EDT	vs. Winnipeg Blue Bombers	W 27–24	9–6	TSN/RDS2	TD Place Stadium	22,867	Recap
18	Sat, Oct 24	4:00 p.m. EDT	at Winnipeg Blue Bombers	W 27–20	10–6	TSN/RDS2	Investors Group Field	23,773	Recap
19	Sun, Nov 1	1:00 p.m. EST	at Hamilton Tiger-Cats	W 12–6	11–6	TSN	Tim Hortons Field	24,340	Recap
20	Sat, Nov 7	4:00 p.m. EST	vs. Hamilton Tiger-Cats	W 44–28	12–6	TSN/RDS2	TD Place Stadium	24,459	Recap

# Games played with colour uniforms.
# Games played with white uniforms.
# Games played with alternate uniforms.

== Post-season ==
=== Schedule ===
Week	Date	Kickoff	Opponent	Results		TV	Venue	Attendance	Summary
Week	Date	Kickoff	Opponent	Score	Record	TV	Venue	Attendance	Summary
East Semi-Final	Bye								
East Final	Sun, Nov 22	1:00 p.m. EST	vs. Hamilton Tiger-Cats	W 35–28	1–0	TSN/RDS	TD Place Stadium	25,093	Recap
103rd Grey Cup	Sun, Nov 29	6:00 p.m. EST	Edmonton Eskimos	L 20–26	1–1	TSN/RDS/ESPN2	Investors Group Field	36,634	

# Games played with colour uniforms.
# Games played with white uniforms.

== Roster ==
2015 Ottawa Redblacks final roster
Quarterbacks: 1 Henry Burris; 5 Danny O'Brien; 17 Thomas DeMarco P; Running backs: 29 William Powell; 37 Kienan LaFrance; Receivers: 7 Maurice Price; 8 Jake Harty; 9 Earmest Jackson; 80 Chris Williams; 81 Patrick Lavoie; 82 Greg Ellingson; 83 Scott MacDonell; 84 Jamill Smith; 88 Brad Sinopoli	Offensive linemen: 55 SirVincent Rogers T; 56 Alex Mateas C/G; 63 Jon Gott C; 64 J'Michael Deane G; 66 Nolan MacMillan G; 67 Colin Kelly T; Defensive linemen: 44 Justin Phillips DE; 47 Nigel Romick DE; 52 Shawn Lemon DE; 74 Keith Shologan DT; 75 Jonathan Williams DT; 90 Andrew Marshall DE; 92 Zack Evans DT; 93 Justin Capicciotti DE; 95 Moton Hopkins DT; 97 Kalonji Kashama DE/DT	Linebackers: 20 David Hinds; 36 Nick Rosamonda; 38 James Green; 45 Damaso Munoz; 48 Jonathan Beaulieu-Richard; Defensive backs: 2 Jovon Johnson; 3 Brandon Sermons; 6 Antoine Pruneau; 14 Abdul Kanneh; 22 Jeff Richards; 25 Brandyn Thompson; 32 Jermaine Robinson	Special teams: 30 Chris Milo K/P; 50 Kevin Malcolm LS; Reserve roster: 16 Marcus Henry WR; 53 Matthew Albright G; Practice roster: 19 Travell Dixon DB; 28 Hugh Charles RB; 34 Travon Van RB; 39 Quinn Backus LB; 49 Ettore Lattanzio DT/DE; 51 Aaron Wheaton T; 59 Jake Silas T; 79 Matt Acree DT; 94 Vincent Desloges DE	Injured list: 4 Brock Jensen QB; 10 Malik Jackson LB; 13 Khalil Paden WR; 15 Ronnie Pfeffer P/K; 18 Alex Pierzchalski WR; 23 Forrest Hightower DB; 24 Jerrell Gavins DB; 27 Jeremiah Johnson RB; 31 John Boyett DB; 33 Jordan Verdone FB; 43 Travis Brown LB; 85 Matt Carter WR; 91 Aston Whiteside DE; 98 Marlon Smith DE; 99 Connor Williams DT; Italics indicate International player

== Coaching staff ==
2015 Ottawa Redblacks staff
Front office: Owner – Jeff Hunt; President and ceo – Bernie Ashe; General manager – Marcel Desjardins; Coordinator, Football Administration – Chantal Covington; Video Coordinator, Braun Gheller; Towel Folder, Colin Farquharson; Pro Scout, Kenny McClay; Head coaches: Head coach – Rick Campbell; Offensive coaches: Offensive coordinator and quarterbacks – Jason Maas; Running backs – Jordan Maksymic; Offensive line – Bryan Chiu; Receivers – Travis Moore	Defensive coaches: Defensive coordinator – Mark Nelson; Defensive line – Leroy Blugh; Defensive backs – Ike Charlton; Defensive assistant – Derek Oswalt; Special teams coaches: Special teams coordinator – Don Yanowsky; → Coaching staff
