= 2017 Ottawa Redblacks season =

Canadian football team season

- General manager: Marcel Desjardins
- Head coach: Rick Campbell
- Home stadium: TD Place Stadium

Results
- Record: 8–9–1
- Division place: 2nd, East
- Playoffs: Lost East Semi-Final
- Team MOP: Greg Ellingson
- Team MOC: Brad Sinopoli
- Team MOR: Sherrod Baltimore

Uniform

The 2017 Ottawa Redblacks season was the fourth season for the team in the Canadian Football League (CFL). The Redblacks finished in second place in the East Division with an 8–9–1 record and hosted a playoff game for the third consecutive year. The team lost to the Saskatchewan Roughriders in the East Semi-Final in a season where Ottawa hosted the 105th Grey Cup championship at TD Place Stadium. This was the fourth season with Marcel Desjardins as general manager and Rick Campbell as head coach.

== Off-season ==
=== Open Tryout Sessions ===
On January 15, 2017, the Redblacks announced they would be holding open tryouts across North America during the spring. The dates and locations are listed in the table below:

Location	Venue	Date
Indianapolis, Indiana	Decatur Central High School	April 1
Durham, North Carolina	North Carolina Central University	April 2
Houston, Texas	Houston Baptist University - Husky Stadium	April 8
San Jose, California	San Jose City College Stadium	April 9
Atlanta, Georgia	Georgia State University	May 20
Las Vegas, Nevada	Bill "Wildcat" Morris Rebel Park	May 21

=== Coaching staff ===
On December 23, 2016 the Redblacks announced they would be bringing back their entire coaching staff from the previous season.

=== Retirements ===
On January 24, 2017 starting quarterback Henry Burris officially announced his retirement. Burris joined the Redblacks prior to their inaugural season, and was the team's starting quarterback for the franchise's first two seasons, and then again for portions of the 2016 season, eventually leading the team to victory in the 104th Grey Cup game. The retirement pushes Trevor Harris into the starting quarterback role, having acquired him prior to the 2016 season for the purpose of being Burris' successor.

=== Free-Agency ===
The 2017 CFL free agency period officially opened at 12:00pm EST on February 14, 2017. Key transactions are listed below:

==== Retained ====
Date	Position	Player name	Ref.
December 14, 2016	LB	Antoine Pruneau	
January 10, 2017	LB	Taylor Reed	
February 10, 2017	WR	Greg Ellingson	
February 13, 2017	DB	Jerrell Gavins	
February 14, 2017	OL	Nolan MacMillan	
March 9, 2017	DL	Moton Hopkins	

==== Incoming ====
Date	Position	Player name	Former team	Ref.
February 14, 2017	LB	Khalil Bass	Winnipeg Blue Bombers	
February 14, 2017	WR	Kenny Shaw	Toronto Argonauts	
February 15, 2017	DB	A.J. Jefferson	Toronto Argonauts	
February 15, 2017	WR	Diontae Spencer	Toronto Argonauts	
May 4, 2017	WR	Tori Gurley	Toronto Argonauts	

==== Departing ====
Date	Position	Player name	Destination	Ref.
January 4, 2017	DB	Forrest Hightower	New Orleans Saints (NFL)	
January 4, 2017	DB	Mitchell White	Philadelphia Eagles (NFL)	
January 4, 2017	DB	Jeff Richards	Carolina Panthers (NFL)	
February 14, 2017	DB	Abdul Kanneh	Hamilton Tiger-Cats	
February 14, 2017	RB	Kienan Lafrance	Saskatchewan Roughriders	
February 16, 2017	WR	Ernest Jackson	Montreal Alouettes	
February 17, 2017	WR	Chris Williams	BC Lions	

=== CFL draft ===
The 2017 CFL draft took place on May 7, 2017. The Redblacks made no trades in the draft and selected last in each of the eight rounds by virtue of winning the Grey Cup.

Round	Pick	Player	Position	School	Hometown
1	9	Evan Johnson	OL	Saskatchewan	Regina, SK
2	18	Anthony Gosselin	FB	Sherbrooke	Otterburn Park, QC
3	26	Eli Ankou	DL	California, Los Angeles	Ottawa, ON
4	35	Louis-Philippe Bourassa	RB	Montreal	Trois-Rivières, QC
5	44	Mathieu Dupuis	DL	Montreal	Laval, QC
6	53	Austen Hartley	WR	Calgary	Calgary, AB
7	62	Ed Ilnicki	RB	Alberta	Spruce Grove, AB
8	71	Jordan Filippelli	OL	Calgary	Sherwood Park, AB

=== Training camp ===
Non-mandatory spring mini-camp was held on April 27–29 at TD Place stadium. Mini-camp focused on quarterbacks, rookies and new signings. Mandatory training camp began on May 28 and will continue through June 14. Training camp consists of 12 practices, 2 walkthroughs and 1 mock game on June 3. Like in previous seasons the sessions of both the mini-camp and training camp were open for the public to view.

== Preseason ==
=== Schedule ===
Week	Date	Kickoff	Opponent	Results		TV	Venue	Attendance	Summary
Week	Date	Kickoff	Opponent	Score	Record	TV	Venue	Attendance	Summary
A	Thu, June 8	7:30 p.m. EDT	vs. Hamilton Tiger-Cats	W 30–29	1–0	TSN	TD Place Stadium	23,252	Recap
B	Thu, June 15	7:30 p.m. EDT	at Montreal Alouettes	L 5–38	1–1	TSN2/RDS	Molson Stadium	12,533	Recap

# Games played with colour uniforms.

== Regular season ==
=== Standings ===
East Division
Team	GP	W	L	T	Pts	PF	PA	Div	Stk	
Toronto Argonauts	18	9	9	0	18	482	456	6–2	W2	Details
Ottawa Redblacks	18	8	9	1	17	495	452	5–3	W3	Details
Hamilton Tiger-Cats	18	6	12	0	12	443	545	4–4	W1	Details
Montreal Alouettes	18	3	15	0	6	314	580	1–7	L11	Details

=== Schedule ===
Week	Date	Kickoff	Opponent	Results		TV	Venue	Attendance	Summary
Week	Date	Kickoff	Opponent	Score	Record	TV	Venue	Attendance	Summary
1	Fri, June 23	7:30 p.m. EDT	vs. Calgary Stampeders	T 31–31 (2OT)	0–0–1	TSN/RDS/ESPNews	TD Place Stadium	24,565	Recap
2	Thu, June 29	9:00 p.m. EDT	at Calgary Stampeders	L 39–43	0–1–1	TSN/RDS	McMahon Stadium	24,613	Recap
3	Sat, July 8	7:00 p.m. EDT	vs. Toronto Argonauts	L 25–26	0–2–1	TSN/RDS	TD Place Stadium	24,347	Recap
4	Fri, July 14	10:00 p.m. EDT	at Edmonton Eskimos	L 21–23	0–3–1	TSN	Commonwealth Stadium	36,260	Recap
5	Wed, July 19	7:30 p.m. EDT	vs. Montreal Alouettes	W 24–19	1–3–1	TSN/RDS	TD Place Stadium	24,756	Recap
5	Mon, July 24	7:30 p.m. EDT	at Toronto Argonauts	L 24–27	1–4–1	TSN/RDS/ESPN2	BMO Field	15,801	Recap
6	Bye								
7	Fri, Aug 4	7:00 p.m. EDT	vs. Winnipeg Blue Bombers	L 30–33	1–5–1	TSN/RDS	TD Place Stadium	23,725	Recap
8	Thu, Aug 10	7:30 p.m. EDT	vs. Edmonton Eskimos	L 20–27	1–6–1	TSN/RDS	TD Place Stadium	23,851	Recap
9	Fri, Aug 18	7:30 p.m. EDT	at Hamilton Tiger-Cats	W 37–18	2–6–1	TSN/RDS	Tim Hortons Field	23,524	Recap
10	Sat, Aug 26	3:30 p.m. EDT	vs. BC Lions	W 31–24	3–6–1	TSN/RDS2	TD Place Stadium	24,887	Recap
11	Thu, Aug 31	7:30 p.m. EDT	at Montreal Alouettes	W 32–4	4–6–1	TSN/RDS	Molson Stadium	18,325	Recap
12	Sat, Sept 9	6:00 p.m. EDT	vs. Hamilton Tiger-Cats	L 22–26	4–7–1	TSN/RDS2	TD Place Stadium	24,901	Recap
13	Sun, Sept 17	1:00 p.m. EDT	at Montreal Alouettes	W 29–11	5–7–1	TSN/RDS/ESPN2	Molson Stadium	22,596	Recap
14	Fri, Sept 22	8:00 p.m. EDT	at Winnipeg Blue Bombers	L 9–29	5–8–1	TSN/RDS	Investor's Group Field	26,588	Recap
15	Fri, Sept 29	7:00 p.m. EDT	vs. Saskatchewan Roughriders	L 17–18	5–9–1	TSN	TD Place Stadium	24,893	Recap
16	Sat, Oct 7	7:00 p.m. EDT	at BC Lions	W 30–25	6–9–1	TSN	BC Place	19,324	Recap
17	Fri, Oct 13	10:00 p.m. EDT	at Saskatchewan Roughriders	W 33–32	7–9–1	TSN	Mosaic Stadium	33,350	Recap
18	Bye								
19	Fri, Oct 27	7:00 p.m. EDT	vs. Hamilton Tiger-Cats	W 41–36	8–9–1	TSN	TD Place Stadium	24,781	Recap
20	Bye								

# Games played with colour uniforms.
# Games played with white uniforms.

== Post-season ==
=== Schedule ===
Game	Date	Kickoff	Opponent	Results		TV	Venue	Attendance	Summary
Game	Date	Kickoff	Opponent	Score	Record	TV	Venue	Attendance	Summary
East Semi-Final	Sun, Nov 12	1:00 p.m. EST	vs. Saskatchewan Roughriders	L 20–31	0–1	TSN/RDS/ESPN2	TD Place Stadium	24,107	Recap

# Games played with colour uniforms.

== Roster ==
2017 Ottawa Redblacks final roster
Quarterbacks: 7 Trevor Harris; 14 Ryan Lindley; 5 Drew Tate; Running backs: 25 Brendan Gillanders; 45 Anthony Gosselin; 23 Mossis Madu; 29 William Powell; Receivers: 86 Juron Criner; 82 Greg Ellingson; 80 Austen Hartley; 8 Jake Harty; 81 Patrick Lavoie; 89 Dominique Rhymes; 85 Diontae Spencer; 87 Joshua Stangby	Offensive linemen: 53 Matthew Albright G; 63 Jon Gott C; 54 Zach Intzandt G; 64 Evan Johnson G; 58 Jason Lauzon-Séguin T; 56 Alex Mateas G/C; 55 SirVincent Rogers T; 59 Jake Silas T; Defensive linemen: 93 Jake Ceresna DT; 98 Avery Ellis DE; 92 Zack Evans DT; 41 Arnaud Gascon-Nadon DE; 49 Ettore Lattanzio DT; 90 Andrew Marshall DE; 43 Jonathan Newsome DE; 47 Nigel Romick DE	Linebackers: 31 Kevin Brown; 10 Serderius Bryant; 6 Antoine Pruneau; 44 Taylor Reed; Defensive backs: 27 Sherrod Baltimore; 21 Adam Berger; 20 Jean-Philippe Bolduc; 30 Adrian James; 15 Keelan Johnson; 9 Jonathan Rose; 22 Teague Sherman; 32 Nick Taylor; 3 Corey Tindal; 33 Dan West	Special teams: 50 Louis-Philippe Bourassa LS; 3 Brett Maher K/P; Practice roster: 46 Marcus Alford DB; 36 Darien Harris LB; 30 Adrian James DB; 38 Henry Josey RB; 57 Eric Lofton G; 83 Scott MacDonell SB; 34 Wayne Moore RB; 24 Austin Reuland WR; 37 Winston Rose DB; 94 Teidrick Smith DE	Injured list: 17 Danny Collins QB; 52 Tanner Doll LB/LS; 68 Tommie Draheim T; 4 Jerrell Gavins DB; 48 Greg Jones LB; 66 Nolan MacMillan G; 16 Quincy McDuffie WR; 42 Ron Omara LB; 2 Kenny Shaw SB; 88 Brad Sinopoli SB; 96 Michael Wakefield DT; 99 Connor Williams DT; Suspended list: R. J. Harris WR; Robert Herron WR; Italics indicate International player

== Coaching staff ==
Ottawa Redblacks Staff
Front office: Owner – Jeff Hunt; President and ceo – Bernie Ashe; General manager – Marcel Desjardins; Director of player personnel – vacant; Coordinator, Football Administration – Chantal Covington; Video Coordinator, Braun Gheller; Pro Scout, Kenny McClay; Head coaches: Head coach – Rick Campbell; Offensive coaches: Offensive coordinator – Jaime Elizondo; Offensive line – Bryan Chiu; Receivers – Travis Moore; Offensive assistant – Beau Walker	Defensive coaches: Defensive coordinator – Mark Nelson; Defensive line – Leroy Blugh; Defensive backs – Ike Charlton; Linebackers – Derek Oswalt; Special teams coaches: Special teams coordinator – Bob Dyce; Strength and conditioning: Strength and conditioning trainer – vacant; → Coaching staff
