= Ottawa Redblacks all-time records and statistics =

The following is a list of Ottawa Redblacks all-time records and statistics current to the Canadian Football League (CFL)'s 2020 season. This list does not include the records for the Ottawa Rough Riders (1876 to 1996) or the Ottawa Renegades (2002 to 2006).

== Grey Cups ==
Most Grey Cups won, player

- 1 – many players in 2016

Most Grey Cup appearances, player

- 2 – many players in 2015 & 2016

Most Grey Cups won, head coach

- 1 – Rick Campbell

Most Grey Cup appearances, head coach

- 2 – Rick Campbell

== Coaching ==
Most seasons coached

- 6 – Rick Campbell

Most games coached

- 106 – Rick Campbell

Most wins

- 44 – Rick Campbell

Most losses

- 62 – Rick Campbell

== Games ==
Most games played

- 93 – Antoine Pruneau
- 88 – Alex Mateas
- 85 – Brad Sinopoli
- 83 – Jon Gott
- 82 – Andrew Marshall

Most seasons played

- 6 – Antoine Pruneau
- 6 – Nolan MacMillan
- 6 – Nigel Romick

== Scoring ==
Most points – career

- 1047 – Lewis Ward – 2018–present

Most points – season

- 198 – Henry Burris – 2015

Most points – game

- 46 vs Hamilton – 2018 East semi final

Most passing touchdowns – career

- 68 – Trevor Harris

Most passing touchdowns – season

- 30 – Trevor Harris – 2017

Most passing touchdowns – game

- 6 – Trevor Harris – 2018 East Final
- 6 – Henry Burris – 2015 Week 20

Most rushing touchdowns – career

- 13 – Henry Burris
- 13 – William Powell

Most rushing touchdowns – season

- 9 – Jeremiah Johnson – 2015

Most rushing touchdowns – game

- 3 – Jeremiah Johnson – 2015 Week 10

Most receiving touchdowns – career

- 30 – Greg Ellingson

Most receiving touchdowns – season

- 12 – Greg Ellingson – 2017

Most receiving touchdown – game

- 3 – Greg Ellingson – 2015 Week 20
- 3 – Chris Williams – 2016 Week 3

Most interception return touchdowns – career

- 1 – many players

Most interception return touchdowns – season

- 1 – many players

== Passing ==
Most passing yards – career

- 13,096 – Trevor Harris
- 11,786 – Henry Burris

Most passing yards – season

- 5,693 – Henry Burris – 2015
- 5,116 – Trevor Harris – 2018

Most passing yards – game

- 504 – Henry Burris – 2015 Week 15

Most pass completions – career

- 1,071 – Trevor Harris
- 968 – Henry Burris

Most pass completions – season

- 481 – Henry Burris – 2015
- 431 – Trevor Harris – 2018

Most pass completions – game

- 45 – Henry Burris – 2015 Week 15

Highest pass completion percentage – career (minimum 1,000 attempts)

- 70.6 – Trevor Harris
- 66.8 – Henry Burris

Highest pass completion percentage – season

- 73.3 – Trevor Harris – 2016
- 70.9 – Henry Burris – 2015

Highest passer rating – career

- 104.6 – Trevor Harris
- 92.4 – Henry Burris

== Rushing ==
Most rushing yards – career

- 2,835 – William Powell

Most rushing yards – season (all 1,000 yard rushers included)

- 1,363 – William Powell – 2018
- 1,026 – William Powell – 2017
- 1,004 – Devonte Williams – 2023

Most rushing yards – game

- 187 – William Powell – 2017 Week 15

== Receiving ==
Most receiving yards– career

- 5,127 – Brad Sinopoli
- 4,866 – Greg Ellingson
- 2,460 – Chris Williams

Most receiving yards – season

- 1,459 – Greg Ellingson – 2017
- 1,376 – Brad Sinopoli – 2018
- 1,260 – Greg Ellingson – 2016
- 1,246 – Chris Williams – 2016

Most receiving yards – game

- 218 – Greg Ellingson – 2016 Week 4

Most receptions – career

- 455 – Brad Sinopoli
- 332 – Greg Ellingson
- 172 – Ernest Jackson

Most receptions – season

- 116 – Brad Sinopoli – 2018
- 96 – Greg Ellingson – 2017
- 91 – Greg Ellingson – 2018
- 91 – Brad Sinopoli – 2017
- 90 – Brad Sinopoli – 2016

Most receptions – game

- 11 – Greg Ellingson – 2018 Week 9
- 11 – Brad Sinopoli – (Twice) 2018 Weeks 4 & 6
- 11 – Dominique Rhymes – 2019 Week 2

== Interceptions ==
Most interceptions – career

- 12 – Abdul Kanneh
- 9 – Antoine Pruneau
- 9 – Jonathan Rose
- 7 – Brandyn Thompson
- 7 – Jerrell Gavins

Most interceptions – season

- 6 – Abdul Kanneh – 2015

Most interceptions – game

- 2 – Jovon Johnson – 2015 Week 17
- 2 – Brandyn Thompson – 2015 Week 18
- 2 – Forrest Hightower – 2016 Grey Cup
- 2 – Jonathan Rose – 2018 Week 14
- 2 – Abdul Kanneh – 2016 Week 19

== Tackles ==
Most defensive tackles – career

- 293 – Avery Williams (2018–2022)

Most defensive tackles – season

- 94 – Taylor Reed – 2017
- 92 – Avery Williams – 2022
- 84 – Damaso Munoz – 2016

Most defensive tackles – game

- 14 – Avery Williams – 2021

== Quarterback sacks ==
Most sacks – career

- 23 – Justin Capicciotti (2014–2015)
- 21 – Zack Evans (2014–2017)

Most sacks – season

- 12 – Justin Capicciotti (2015)
- 11 – Justin Capicciotti (2014)
