= 2014 Ottawa Redblacks season =

Canadian football team season

- General manager: Marcel Desjardins
- Head coach: Rick Campbell
- Home stadium: TD Place Stadium

Results
- Record: 2–16
- Division place: 4th, East
- Playoffs: did not qualify
- Team MOP: Jasper Simmons
- Team MOC: Justin Capicciotti
- Team MOR: Antoine Pruneau

Uniform

The 2014 Ottawa Redblacks season was the first season for the team in the Canadian Football League (CFL). The Redblacks are the third CFL franchise to play in the city of Ottawa, and the first since the suspension of the Renegades in 2006. The Redblacks finished the season in fourth place in the East Division with a 2–16 record and were eliminated from playoff contention after a week 16 loss to the BC Lions.

== Off-season ==
=== Acquisitions ===
The Redblacks signed their first three players on November 28, 2013. Ottawa signed wide receiver Fred Rouse, defensive back/safety Nick Turnbull and defensive end DiMetrio Tyson. Leading up to the 2013 CFL Expansion Draft the Redblacks signed a number of players including; defensive back Jerrell Gavins, quarterback Matt Faulkner and running backs Jordan Roberts, Michael Hayes, and Eric O'Neal.

In February 2014, following the Expansion Draft, the Redblacks made a series of significant signings including the acquisition of former MOP quarterback Henry Burris, former defensive player of the year Jovon Johnson and LB Malik Jackson.

=== Expansion Draft ===
The 2013 CFL Expansion Draft was a three-round CFL draft held on December 16, 2013, which assign players from existing CFL teams to the new Ottawa team. The structure of the draft was announced on January 19, 2011, which described one round for selecting import (Note: Under the terms of the collective bargaining agreement ratified in 2014, "non-import" players will be now be termed "nationals" and "import" players will be termed "internationals".) players and two rounds for selecting non-import players. Ottawa selected three players from each of the eight existing teams for a total of 24 players. Ottawa was allowed to select eight import players and 16 non-import players with quarterbacks, kickers and punters eligible within their respective import/non-import categories. Ottawa was able to select a maximum of two quarterbacks and one kicker/punter, but not select any two of these three players from the same team.

Overall, 24 players were selected in the draft, including two quarterbacks, three receivers, one running back, two fullbacks, six offensive linemen, six defensive linemen, three linebackers, and one defensive back. Only one pending free agent was selected, with Rory Kohlert's contract expiring February 15, 2014. The selections were announced live at cfl.ca on December 16, 2013.

=== 2013 CFL draft ===
The 2013 CFL draft took place on May 6, 2013. Despite not playing in the 2013 season, the Redblacks picked last in the first four rounds of the draft, with selections being limited to 18 NCAA redshirt juniors. These players were not eligible to sign for the 2013 season, but may sign with Ottawa for this season.

Round	Pick	Player	Position	School/Club team
1	9	Nolan MacMillan	OL	Iowa
2	18	Connor Williams	DE	Utah State
3	27	Kalonji Kashama	DE	Eastern Michigan
4	36	Tyler Digby	TE	Robert Morris

=== 2014 CFL draft ===
The 2014 CFL draft took place on May 13, 2014. The Redblacks began with the first pick in each of the seven rounds, but traded the first overall pick to Calgary for Jon Gott. They re-entered the first round after trading Kevin Glenn to the BC Lions and moved positions in the first and second round following a trade with the Montreal Alouettes. They also moved down in the third round after trading for Justin Phillips. The club also had two bonus picks at the end of the draft, which brought their total to nine.

Round	Pick	Player	Position	School/Club team
1	4	Antoine Pruneau	DB	Montreal
2	13	Scott MacDonell	WR	Queen's
3	23	Nigel Romick	DL	Saint Mary's
4	28	Aaron Wheaton	OL	Toronto
5	37	Hugo Desmarais	OL	Laval
6	46	Stephon Miller	DL	Windsor
7	55	Vincent Desloges	DL	Laval
7	64	Alexandre Bernard	LB	McGill
7	65	Kevin Malcolm	LS	McMaster

=== Training camp ===
On March 11, 2014, the Redblacks announced that they would hold a mini-training camp April 9–10, 2014 at Bon Secours Washington Redskins Training Center in Richmond, Virginia. At this camp, the entire team roster would participate in drills and work out under the supervision of head coach Rick Campbell and the Redblacks football operations staff.

== Schedule ==
On February 10, 2014, it was announced that the Ottawa Redblacks would play their "home" pre-season game at Mosaic Stadium at Taylor Field against the Roughriders on June 14, 2014. Ottawa was the home side of the field and the team was introduced as the home team. It was further announced that the Redblacks would have a bye for the first week of the regular season and then play away games at Edmonton and Winnipeg before their home opener in Week 4 on July 18 against the Toronto Argonauts. These arrangements were made to accommodate for any delays that might be incurred due to the construction of TD Place Stadium.

This was the Redblacks' inaugural season in the Canadian Football League.

== Preseason ==
Week	Date	Kickoff	Opponent	Results		TV	Venue	Attendance	Summary
Week	Date	Kickoff	Opponent	Score	Record	TV	Venue	Attendance	Summary
A	Bye								
B	Sat, June 14	6:00 p.m. EDT	vs. Saskatchewan Roughriders	L 17–21	0–1	TSN2	Mosaic Stadium	13,014	Recap
C	Fri, June 20	7:00 p.m. EDT	at Montreal Alouettes	W 26–10	1–1	TSN	Molson Stadium	18,141	Recap

# Games played with white uniforms.

== Regular season ==
=== Standings ===
East Division
Team	GP	W	L	T	PF	PA	Pts	
Hamilton Tiger-Cats	18	9	9	0	417	395	18	Details
Montreal Alouettes	18	9	9	0	360	394	18	Details
Toronto Argonauts	18	8	10	0	450	456	16	Details
Ottawa Redblacks	18	2	16	0	278	465	4	Details

=== Schedule ===
Week	Date	Kickoff	Opponent	Results		TV	Venue	Attendance	Summary
Week	Date	Kickoff	Opponent	Score	Record	TV	Venue	Attendance	Summary
1	Bye								
2	Thur, July 3	8:30 p.m. EDT	at Winnipeg Blue Bombers	L 28–36	0–1	TSN/RDS2	Investors Group Field	27,553	Recap
3	Fri, July 11	10:00 p.m. EDT	at Edmonton Eskimos	L 11–27	0–2	TSN/RDS/ESPNews	Commonwealth Stadium	31,521	Recap
4	Fri, July 18	7:00 p.m. EDT	vs. Toronto Argonauts	W 18–17	1–2	TSN/RDS	TD Place Stadium	24,326	Recap
5	Sat, July 26	7:00 p.m. EDT	at Hamilton Tiger-Cats	L 23–33	1–3	TSN/RDS	Ron Joyce Stadium	6,500	Recap
6	Sat, Aug 2	7:00 p.m. EDT	vs. Saskatchewan Roughriders	L 14–38	1–4	TSN/RDS2	TD Place Stadium	24,303	Recap
7	Sat, Aug 9	7:30 p.m. EDT	at Calgary Stampeders	L 17–38	1–5	TSN/RDS	McMahon Stadium	28,391	Recap
8	Fri, Aug 15	7:30 p.m. EDT	vs. Edmonton Eskimos	L 8–10	1–6	TSN/RDS2	TD Place Stadium	24,291	Recap
9	Sun, Aug 24	3:00 p.m. EDT	vs. Calgary Stampeders	L 7–32	1–7	TSN	TD Place Stadium	24,327	Recap
10	Fri, Aug 29	7:30 p.m. EDT	at Montreal Alouettes	L 10–20	1–8	TSN/RDS	Molson Stadium	19,440	Recap
11	Fri, Sept 5	7:30 p.m. EDT	vs. BC Lions	L 5–7	1–9	TSN/RDS2	TD Place Stadium	24,287	Recap
12	Bye								
13	Sun, Sept 21	4:00 p.m. EDT	at Saskatchewan Roughriders	L 32–35 (2OT)	1–10	TSN/RDS2	Mosaic Stadium	33,427	Recap
14	Fri, Sept 26	7:00 p.m. EDT	vs. Montreal Alouettes	L 7–15	1–11	TSN/RDS	TD Place Stadium	24,317	Recap
15	Fri, Oct 3	7:00 p.m. EDT	vs. Winnipeg Blue Bombers	W 42–20	2–11	TSN	TD Place Stadium	24,242	Recap
16	Sat, Oct 11	10:00 p.m. EDT	at BC Lions	L 3–41	2–12	TSN	BC Place	31,217	Recap
17	Fri, Oct 17	7:00 p.m. EDT	at Hamilton Tiger-Cats	L 6–16	2–13	TSN/RDS2/ESPN2	Tim Hortons Field	20,125	Recap
18	Fri, Oct 24	6:30 p.m. EDT	vs. Montreal Alouettes	L 17–23	2–14	TSN/RDS	TD Place Stadium	24,458	Recap
19	Fri, Oct 31	7:30 p.m. EDT	vs. Hamilton Tiger-Cats	L 25–34	2–15	TSN/RDS2	TD Place Stadium	24,101	Recap
20	Fri, Nov 7	7:00 p.m. EST	at Toronto Argonauts	L 5–23	2–16	TSN/RDS2	Rogers Centre	19,687	Recap

# Games played with colour uniforms.
# Games played with white uniforms.
# Games played with alternate uniforms.

== Roster ==
2014 Ottawa RedBlacks final roster
Quarterbacks: 1 Henry Burris; 9 Danny O'Brien; 18 Joey Elliott; Running backs: 19 Roy Finch; 27 Jeremiah Johnson; 49 John Delahunt; Receivers: 8 Eddie Poole; 13 Khalil Paden; 15 Jamill Smith; 16 Marcus Henry; 81 Patrick Lavoie; 83 Scott MacDonell; 84 Wallace Miles; 85 Matt Carter; 87 Robin Medeiros	Offensive linemen: 53 Matthew Albright C/G; 55 Alexander Krausnick C; 63 Jon Gott G/C; 64 J'Michael Deane T/G; 66 Nolan MacMillan G/C; 67 Colin Kelly T; Defensive linemen: 47 Nigel Romick DE; 74 Keith Shologan DT; 90 Andrew Marshall DE; 92 Zack Evans DT; 93 Justin Capicciotti DE; 95 Moton Hopkins DT; 97 Kalonji Kashama DE/DT; 98 Marlon Smith DE	Linebackers: 6 Antoine Pruneau; 20 David Hinds; 31 Jasper Simmons; 33 Jordan Verdone; 45 Damaso Munoz; 46 Jason Pottinger; Defensive backs: 2 Jovon Johnson; 7 Eric Fraser; 14 Abdul Kanneh; 21 Hugo Lopez; 22 Brandon McDonald; 24 Jerrell Gavins; 25 Brandyn Thompson; 32 Jermaine Robinson	Special teams: 3 Brett Maher K/P; 54 Kevin Scott LS; Reserve roster: 38 James Green LB; Practice roster: -- Torrance Hunt RB; 30 Philippe Dubuisson-Lebon LB; 36 Charles Clay DB; 37 D. J. Key DB; 41 Justin Cudworth LB; 49 Zach Ramirez K; 58 D. J. Young T; 68 Eric Schultz T; 82 Dan Buckner WR; 86 L. J. Castille WR; 94 Youri Yenga DE; 96 Devan Walker DE	Injured list: 4 Alex Carder QB; 5 Eddie Elder DB; 10 Kierrie Johnson WR; 17 Thomas DeMarco QB; 23 Jonathan Williams RB; 28 D. J. Harper RB; 29 Chevon Walker RB; 34 Michael Hayes RB; 39 Michael Dadzie DE; 42 Anton McKenzie LB; 43 Travis Brown LB; 44 Justin Phillips DE; 50 Jeraill McCuller T; 57 Hugo Desmarais G; 59 Joe Eppele T; 75 Jonathan Williams DT; 80 Dobson Collins WR; 99 Connor Williams DT; Italics indicate American player Roster updated 2026-05-16; Depth Chart • Transactions

== Coaching staff ==
2014 Ottawa Redblacks staff
Front office: Owner – Jeff Hunt; President and ceo – Bernie Ashe; General manager – Marcel Desjardins; Coordinator, Football Administration – Chantal Covington; Video Coordinator, Braun Gheller; Towel Folder, Colin Farquharson; Pro Scout, Kenny McClay; Head coaches: Head coach – Rick Campbell; Offensive coaches: Offensive coordinator – Mike Gibson; Quarterbacks – Marcus Crandell; Running backs – Don Yanowsky; Receivers – Travis Moore; Offensive assistant – Jordan Maksymic	Defensive coaches: Defensive coordinator – Mark Nelson; Defensive line – Leroy Blugh; Defensive backs – Ike Charlton; Defensive assistant – Derek Oswalt; Special teams coaches: Special teams coordinator – Don Yanowsky; → Coaching Staff
