= Ray Early =

American football player (born 1992)

No. 39, 43
- Positions: Kicker, punter

Personal information
- Born: June 3, 1992 (age 34); Florence, South Carolina, U.S.
- Listed height: 5 ft 11 in (1.80 m)
- Listed weight: 220 lb (100 kg)

Career information
- High school: Darlington (Darlington, South Carolina)
- College: Furman (2010–2013)
- NFL draft: 2014: undrafted

Career history
- Saskatchewan Roughriders (2015); Ottawa Redblacks (2016)

Awards and highlights
- Grey Cup champion (2016); Second-team FCS All-America (2013); First-team All-SoCon (2013); 2× Second-team All-SoCon (2010, 2013) (Note: Selected in 2013 as punter); SoCon All-Freshman Team (2010)

Career CFL statistics
- Games played: 23
- Field goals made: 4
- Field goals attempted: 5
- Field goal %: 80
- Points scored: 23
- Punts: 129
- Punting yards: 5,740
- Average punt: 44.5
- Longest punt: 82
- Kickoff yards: 4,274
- Stats at CFL.ca

Raymond Joseph Early (born June 3, 1992) is an American former professional football placekicker and punter who played in the Canadian Football League (CFL) with the Saskatchewan Roughriders and Ottawa Redblacks. He played college football for the Furman Paladins.

== Early life ==
Early was born on June 3, 1992, in Florence, South Carolina. Early served as the team's kicker and punter and was twice named first team all-region and 3A kicker of the year in 2009. He went 13 of 22 on field goal attempts and averaged 43.0 yards per punt in his career. Early also played in the 2009 South Carolina North-South All-Star Game. He committed to play college football at Furman University.

== College career ==
Early played college football for the Furman Paladins from 2010 to 2013. In his freshman year, he kicked 11 of 12 field goals and 40 of 41 extra points, earning himself SoCon second-team and All-Freshman honors. As a sophomore, Early struggled, converting only two of six field goals and 14 of 19 PATs, while taking over kickoff duties.

In 2012, he also became the team's punter with a career long of 82 yards against Wofford. Early made 10 of 16 field goals and 32 of 33 extra points to go with an average punt of 42.1 yards. As a senior, he kicked 19 of 24 field goals and averaged 43.6 on punts. Early was a first-team all-SoCon and second-team AP FCS All-American.

== Professional career ==
After going undrafted in the 2014 NFL draft, Early signed with the Saskatchewan Roughriders of the Canadian Football League (CFL) as an undrafted free agent on May 31, 2015. He was used as a punter and kickoff specialist by the Roughriders and played in 18 games. He attended Darlington High School in Darlington, South Carolina. In 2015, Early averaged 45 yards per punt and had 3,826 kickoff yards with eight singles. On February 10, 2016, he was released by the team.

On October 17, 2016, Early was signed to the practice roster of the Ottawa Redblacks and the following day he was promoted to the active roster. He played the remaining five games of the season, including the 104th Grey Cup at kicker and punter. The Redblacks won in overtime against the Calgary Stampeders with Early scoring two field goals and three converts. On June 6, 2017, he was released by the team.
