= Travis Brown (linebacker) =

American football player and coach (born 1990)

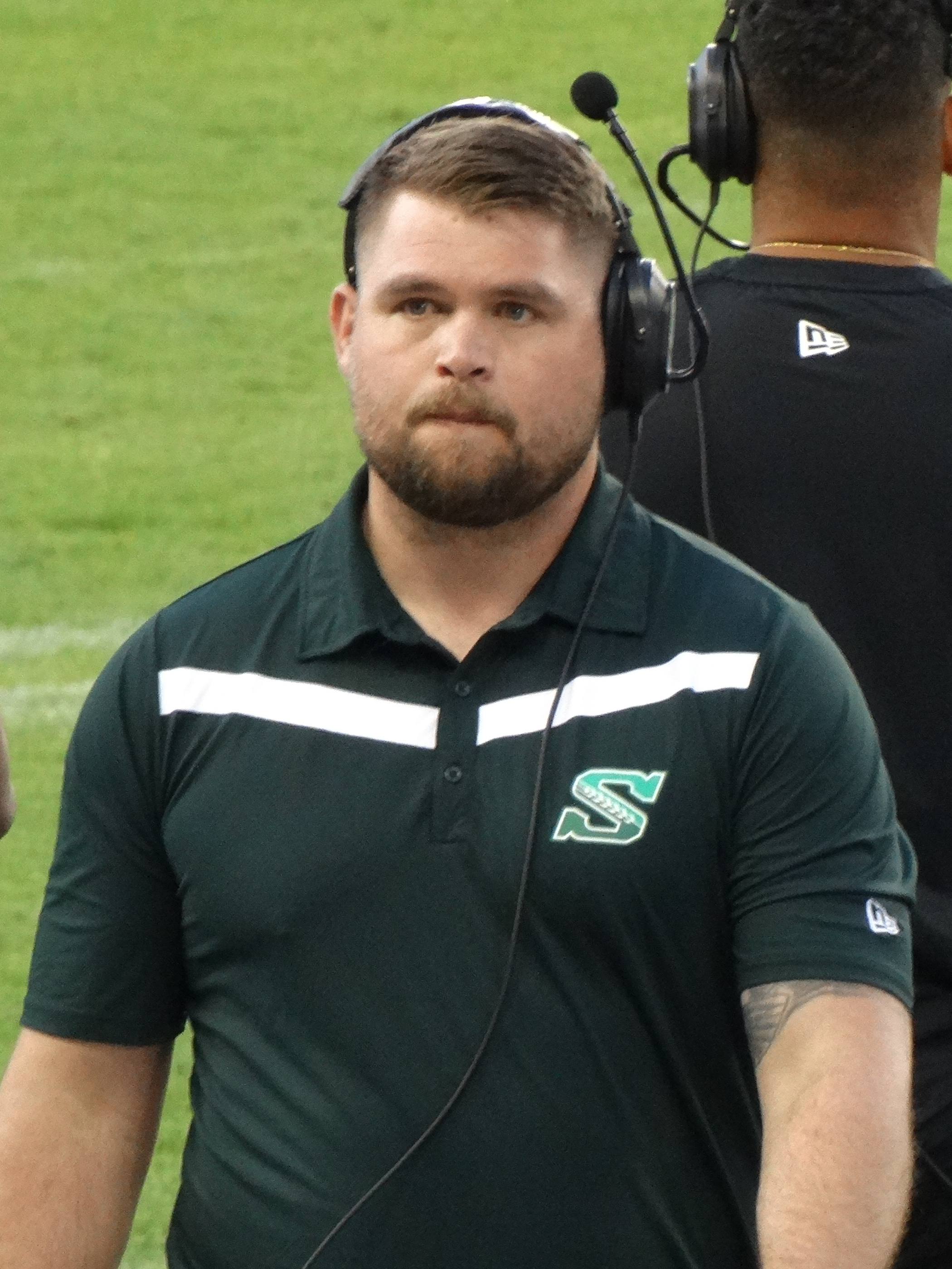
- Brown with the Saskatchewan Roughriders in 2025

Saskatchewan Roughriders
- Title: Linebackers coach Run game coordinator

Personal information
- Born: July 11, 1990 (age 36); Albuquerque, New Mexico, U.S.
- Listed height: 6 ft 1 in (1.85 m)
- Listed weight: 236 lb (107 kg)

Career information
- Position: Linebacker (No. 43)
- High school: Clovis West (Fresno, California)
- College: Fresno State (2009–2012)
- NFL draft: 2013: undrafted

Career history

Playing
- Ottawa Redblacks (2014–2015)

Coaching
- Fresno State (2017–2018) Defensive quality control Assistant linebackers; Edmonton Eskimos (2018–2019) Assistant linebackers Linebackers; BC Lions (2021–2024) Linebackers; Saskatchewan Roughriders (2025–present) Linebackers; Saskatchewan Roughriders (2026–present) Run game coordinator

Awards and highlights
- As coach: Grey Cup champion (2025); As player: First-team All-WAC (2011); Second-team All-MW (2012); Second-team All-WAC (2010)

Career CFL statistics
- Games played: 21
- Games started: 17
- Total tackles: 70
- Sacks: 3
- Interceptions: 2
- Forced fumbles: 1
- Defensive touchdowns: 1
- Stats at CFL.ca

Travis Brown (born July 11, 1990) is an American professional football coach and former player who is the linebackers coach and run game coordinator for the Saskatchewan Roughriders of the Canadian Football League (CFL). He played at linebacker for the Ottawa Redblacks of the CFL. Brown played college football for the Fresno State Bulldogs.

== College career ==
Brown played college football for the Fresno State Bulldogs from 2009 to 2012. He played in 52 games, recording 260 tackles, including 21.5 tackles for loss, six sacks, three pass deflections, one interception and one forced fumble, both of which were returned for a touchdown. Brown was named second-team all conference twice, once in 2010 in the WAC and another in 2012 in the Mountain West. He earned first-team All-WAC honors in 2011 behind 85 tackles, including 8.5 for loss, three sacks and three pass deflections.

== Professional career ==
Pre-draft measurables
Height	Weight	Arm length	Hand span	Wingspan	40-yard dash	10-yard split	20-yard split	20-yard shuttle	Three-cone drill	Vertical jump	Broad jump	Bench press
6 ft 0 in (1.83 m)	232 lb (105 kg)	30 1/2 in (0.77 m)	8 3/4 in (0.22 m)	6 ft 1 7/8 in (1.88 m)	4.71 s	1.69 s	2.80 s	4.38 s	7.08 s	30.0 in (0.76 m)	8 ft 9 in (2.67 m)	18 reps
All values from Pro Day

On April 3, 2014, Brown signed with the Ottawa Redblacks for their inaugural season in 2014. He played in 17 games, starting in 16, making 65 tackles, three sacks, one forced fumble and two interceptions, including one pick-six against the Winnipeg Blue Bombers.

In 2015, Brown suffered a shoulder injury in the season opener but returned and played four games, making five tackles, before ending the season on the injured list after aggravating his shoulder. He was released on February 22, 2016.

== Coaching career ==
=== Fresno State Bulldogs ===
After his playing career ended, Brown began coaching at his alma mater, Fresno State in 2017. He began as a defensive quality control coach, before moving to the assistant linebackers position in 2018.

=== Edmonton Eskimos ===
On April 3, 2018, Brown was announced as the assistant linebackers for the Edmonton Eskimos of the Canadian Football League (CFL). He was promoted to the linebackers coach for the 2019 season.

=== BC Lions ===
On January 6, 2020, the BC Lions announced that Brown would become the team's linebackers coach. He remained in that position from 2021 to 2024.

=== Saskatchewan Roughriders ===
On December 19, 2024, Brown was named the linebackers coach for the Saskatchewan Roughriders. He won the 112th Grey Cup when the Roughriders defeated the Montreal Alouettes, 25–17. In addition to his duties as linebackers coach, he was named the team's run game coordinator on January 9, 2026.
