= Jake Silas =

American gridiron football player (born 1991)

No. 59
- Position: Offensive lineman

Personal information
- Born: September 1, 1991 (age 35); Portland, Michigan, U.S.
- Listed height: 6 ft 7 in (2.01 m)
- Listed weight: 315 lb (143 kg)

Career information
- High school: Portland High School
- College: Buffalo

Career history
- 2015–2017: Ottawa Redblacks

Awards and highlights
- Grey Cup champion (2016); Second-team All-MAC (2014)
- Stats at CFL.ca

Jake Silas (born September 1, 1991) is an American former professional football offensive lineman who played for the Ottawa Redblacks of the Canadian Football League (CFL). He played college football at the University at Buffalo and attended Portland High School in Portland, Michigan. Silas signed with Ottawa as a free agent following the end of his college football career. After spending the entire 2015 season on the Redblacks' practice squad, he was signed to the active roster for the 2016 season, and made his CFL debut in the starting lineup on June 25, 2016, against the Edmonton Eskimos.
