= Maurice Price =

American football player (born 1985)

No. 17
- Position: Wide receiver

Personal information
- Born: September 11, 1985 (age 41); Orlando, Florida, U.S.
- Listed height: 6 ft 1 in (1.85 m)
- Listed weight: 197 lb (89 kg)

Career information
- College: Charleston Southern
- NFL draft: 2007: undrafted

Career history
- Kansas City Chiefs (2007–2008); New England Patriots (2008); San Francisco 49ers (2009)*; Calgary Stampeders (2009)*; Baltimore Ravens (2009–2010)*; Florida Tuskers (2010); Washington Redskins (2010–2011)*; Tampa Bay Buccaneers (2011)*; Calgary Stampeders (2012–2014); Ottawa Redblacks (2015); Saskatchewan Roughriders (2016)*
- * Offseason or practice squad member only

Awards and highlights
- Big South All-Freshman (2004); 2× First-team All-Big South (2005–2006); Grey Cup champion (2014)
- Stats at Pro Football Reference
- Stats at CFL.ca (archive)
- Stats at ArenaFan.com

Maurice Price (born September 11, 1985) is an American former professional football wide receiver who played for the Calgary Stampeders and Ottawa Redblacks of the Canadian Football League (CFL). He was signed by the Kansas City Chiefs as an undrafted free agent in 2007. He played college football at Charleston Southern.

Price was also a member of the New England Patriots, San Francisco 49ers, Baltimore Ravens, Florida Tuskers, Washington Redskins, and Tampa Bay Buccaneers.

== Early life ==
Price attended Olympia High School in Orlando, Florida and was a student and a letterwinner in football. In football, he was a three-year letterwinner, and as a senior, he was a first-team All-County selection and a second-team All-Central Florida selection. As a junior at Charleston Southern University he led the nation in receptions with 103 passes caught. Price then entered the NFL draft pool, skipping his senior season. He impressed many teams with his extraordinary athletic ability which included over 11 feet in the broad jump and over 40 inches in the vertical leap.

== Professional career ==
=== Kansas City Chiefs ===
After being passed-up in the NFL draft he was offered undrafted free agent contracts by 15 NFL clubs. He chose the Kansas City Chiefs and again impressed in training camp until an injury ended his season in 2007 and he was placed on the Injured Reserve. Price was signed by the Chiefs as an undrafted free agent on May 8, 2007. He was placed on injured reserve on August 28, 2007. He led all Chiefs' receivers in both receptions and receiving yardage in the 2008 pre-season games, including a touchdown at Chicago in his first NFL game appearance. He made the Chiefs' 53-man roster in 2008, but was waived by the team on September 9, 2008, and re-signed to the Chiefs' practice squad on September 11, 2008. He was then waived from the practice squad on September 19, 2008. Following this release he received attention from many NFL clubs and worked out for three clubs before choosing to sign to the Active roster of the New England Patriots.

=== New England Patriots ===
Price was signed to the 53 man roster by the Patriots on September 24, 2008. He was waived by the team on October 11, 2008, and re-signed to the team's practice squad on October 15, 2008.

=== San Francisco 49ers ===
Price was signed to a future contract by the San Francisco 49ers on January 29, 2009. He was waived on September 5.

=== Calgary Stampeders ===
Price was signed to the practice roster of the Calgary Stampeders on September 14, 2009.

=== Baltimore Ravens ===
Price was signed to the practice squad of the Baltimore Ravens on December 16, 2009. On January 19 Price signed a reserve future contract.

=== Washington Redskins ===
Price was signed to the Washington Redskins' practice squad on December 1, 2010. He was waived on July 30, 2011.

=== Tampa Bay Buccaneers ===
Price signed with the Tampa Bay Buccaneers on August 14, 2011. He was cut on September 3, 2011.

=== Calgary Stampeders ===
Price re-signed with the Calgary Stampeders on February 22, 2012. After showing great promise to become a starter and suffering a broken foot in training camp Price returned in late season to become the leading receiver on the team in the last four games of the regular season. This streak included three games in a row with touchdown reception of 50 yards or more. On October 20 in a home game played in a snowstorm, Price recorded 71 receiving yards on two catches – including a 56-yard reception for a touchdown, his first in the CFL. In the first playoff game he again led the team in receptions and yardage with 6 grabs for 127 yards.

Maurice Price missed 4 of the first 8 games of the 2013 season due to various injuries. He won Offensive Player of the Week, for Week 10 of the 2013 CFL season, putting up 165 yards receiving and 3 touchdowns. After the 2013 season, Price signed a contract extension with the Stampeders, avoiding pending free agency.

Price started the 2014 CFL season with a bang, a 102-yard touchdown reception against the Al's. Following that game Price only played in 9 of the remaining 17 games regular season games, missing time due to injury. Aside from the Week 1, 102 yard performance, he only averaged 49.1 receiving yards per game. Maurice Price had 64 receiving yards on 5 catches during the 102nd Grey Cup, his only post-season game that season. The Stamps won the 102nd Grey Cup to conclude the season, giving Price his first Grey Cup championship.

=== Ottawa RedBlacks ===
On January 15, 2015, the Ottawa RedBlacks traded LB Jasper Simmons and WR Dan Buckner to the Stampeders in exchange for Maurice Price. Rick Cambell, the head coach of the RedBlacks, had been with Price and the Stamps during the 2012 and 2013 CFL seasons. Ottawa was hoping that Price can provide the offense with some explosiveness which the team lacked during its inaugural season. In his first season with the Redblacks Price did not make as large an impact as some might have expected, finishing 5th on the team in receiving yards. Maurice Price did however manage to play in every game of the 2015 CFL season, something that had troubled him in the past. He set a career best with 58 receptions, accounting for 603 yards with a lone receiving touchdown.

=== Saskatchewan Roughriders ===
On January 11, 2016, Price was traded to the Saskatchewan Roughriders along with a sixth round 2016 CFL draft pick for two late 2016 draft picks. Price signed a contract extension the next day.

Months after signing a contract with the Roughriders, Price retired.
