= Rick Campbell =

American-Canadian gridiron football coach (born 1970)

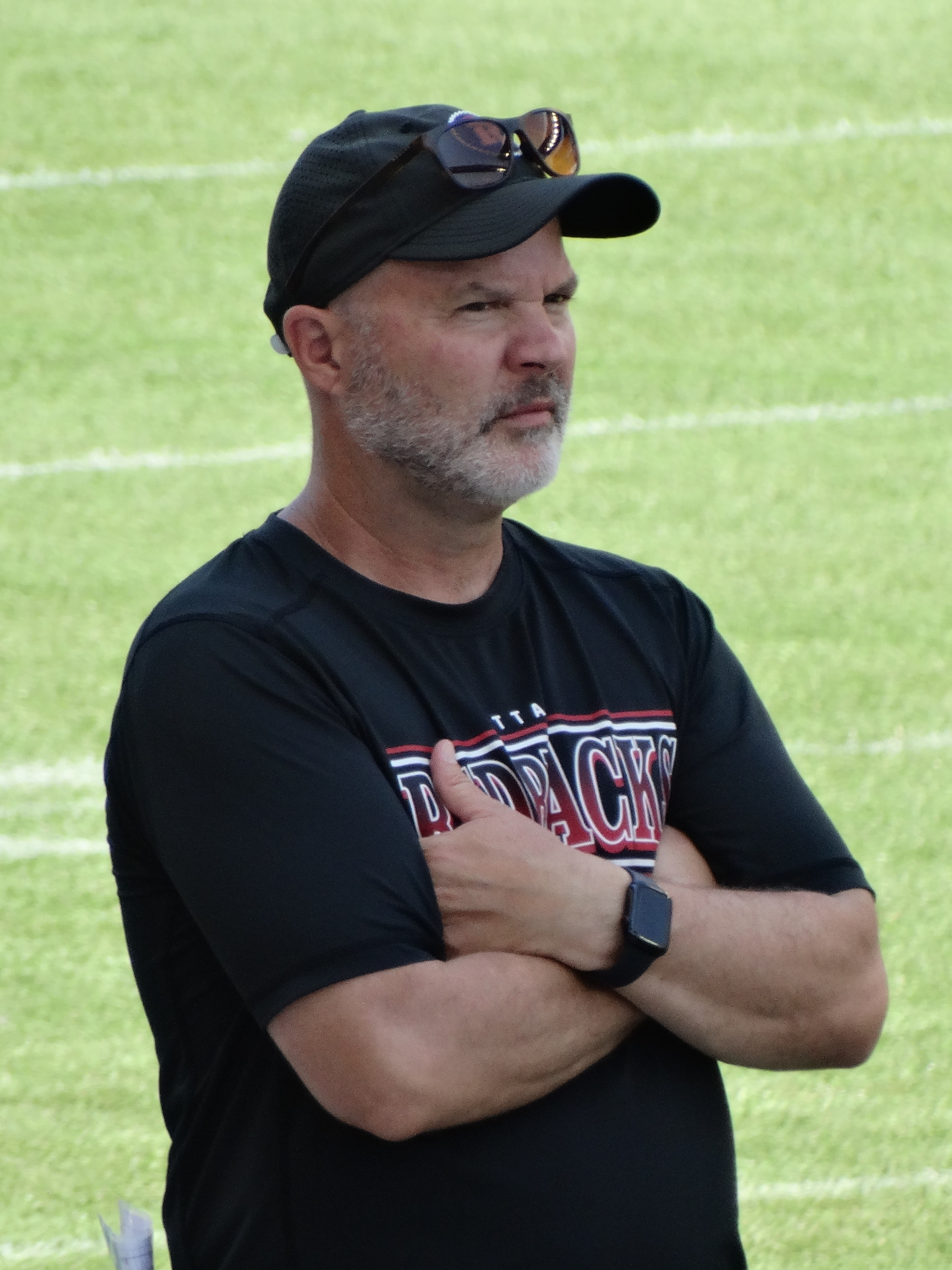
- Campbell with the Ottawa Redblacks in 2025

Edmonton Elks
- Title: Coaching analyst

Personal information
- Born: December 20, 1970 (age 55); Spokane, Washington, U.S.

Career information
- High school: Harry Ainlay (Edmonton, Alberta, Canada)
- College: Washington State University

Career history
- Oregon (1996–1998) Graduate assistant; Edmonton Eskimos (1999–2004) Defensive backs / Special teams coordinator; Edmonton Eskimos (2005–2008) Defensive coordinator; Winnipeg Blue Bombers (2009) Defensive backs / special teams coordinator; Calgary Stampeders (2010) Running backs coach; Edmonton Eskimos (2011) Ass. head coach / Special teams coordinator; Calgary Stampeders (2012–2013) Defensive coordinator; Ottawa Redblacks (2014–2019) Head coach; BC Lions (2020–2024) Head coach / Co-general manager; Ottawa Redblacks (2025) Special teams coordinator; Edmonton Elks (2026–present) Coaching analyst

Awards and highlights
- 3× Grey Cup champion (2003, 2005, 2016); 2015 Annis Stukus Trophy

Rick Campbell (born December 20, 1970) is an American-Canadian professional football coach who is a coaching analyst for the Edmonton Elks of the Canadian Football League (CFL). He was the Calgary Stampeders' defensive coordinator from 2012 to 2013 and was also an assistant coach with the Edmonton Eskimos and Winnipeg Blue Bombers. He then served as the head coach for the Redblacks for six seasons and for the BC Lions for four seasons. He is a three-time Grey Cup champion, once as the special teams coordinator with the Eskimos in 2003, again with the Eskimos as the defensive coordinator in 2005, and once as the head coach of the Redblacks in 2016. He attended Washington State University.

== Early life ==
Campbell was born in Spokane, when his father, Hugh was the head coach of the football team at Whitworth College. As a result of his father's coaching career, Campbell grew up in Spokane, Edmonton, Los Angeles and Houston, before returning to Edmonton. Campbell was a high school football star at Harry Ainlay High School. Following his high school graduation, Campbell attended Washington State University, majoring in education before serving as the secondary and special teams coach for the University of Oregon Ducks as a graduate assistant from 1996 to 1998.

== Coaching career ==
=== Edmonton Eskimos (first stint) ===
Campbell was highly sought after as a coaching prospect, following his stint at the University of Oregon. When Kay Stephenson, the head coach of the Edmonton Eskimos at the time, asked his father Hugh for permission to hire him, he was denied. Upon being asked by Don Matthews to appoint him to the coaching staff, fearing a backlash in the media, the elder Campbell reluctantly agreed. Campbell served as the team's special teams and defensive coach under both Don Matthews and Tom Higgins, earning a Grey Cup ring in 2003. Campbell served in those capacities until 2004, when he was promoted to defensive coordinator, under new head coach Danny Maciocia. Campbell earned his second Grey Cup ring in 2005, and stayed on in that position until 2008.

=== Winnipeg Blue Bombers ===
Shortly after Richie Hall's hiring, Campbell left the Eskimos, and was appointed the defensive backs and special teams coordinator under new the Winnipeg Blue Bombers head coach Mike Kelly. The Bombers campaign was a disaster as the team finished the season at 7–11, and Kelly was fired in the off-season due to personal conduct issues. Campbell would resign from his post shortly after Kelly's dismissal.

=== Calgary Stampeders (first stint) ===
Following his departure from Winnipeg, Campbell returned to Alberta, but this time with the provincial rival Calgary Stampeders. Campbell served as the running backs coach, under John Hufnagel. Campbell resigned at the end of the season.

=== Edmonton Eskimos (second stint) ===
Campbell then returned to the Edmonton Eskimos to serve as the assistant head coach and special teams coordinator under new head coach Kavis Reed. Once again, his stint in Edmonton lasted only one year.

=== Calgary Stampeders (second stint) ===
Campbell then returned to the Calgary Stampeders to replace Chris Jones, who left the Stamps that off-season to accept a defensive coordinator role with the Toronto Argonauts. Under Campbell's tutelage, the Stamps recorded 63 sacks, en route to the league's best record for two consecutive seasons. The Stamps defense under Campbell were known for their aggressive style of play, leading the league in turnovers on downs and second in fewest points allowed. Campbell's work with the Stampeders led him to being considered as a prime candidate for various coaching vacancies around the league.

=== Ottawa Redblacks (first stint) ===
Campbell got his first opportunity to become a head coach, as he was named the first head coach in the history of the Ottawa Redblacks franchise. Campbell returned to his hometown for the first time as a CFL head coach on July 11, 2014 when the Redblacks played the Eskimos. The Eskimos would go on to defeat the Redblacks 27–11 in that game. Campbell won his first game as a CFL head coach on July 17, 2014 when the Redblacks defeated the Toronto Argonauts, 18–17. Despite the initial momentum, Campbell's team finished their inaugural season at 2–16, which was the worst record in the CFL.

Campbell's second season saw a vast improvement as the Redblacks went from 2–16 in their inaugural season to a 12–6 record, which included clinching the franchise's first ever playoff berth. The Redblacks would also clinch a first round bye and home field advantage in the CFL East Division Finals. Under Campbell's tutelage, the Redblacks became the first Ottawa-based CFL team to have a winning record since 1979, along with being the first Ottawa-based CFL team to finish first in the East Division since 1978 and the first Ottawa-based team ever to finish with 12 regular season wins. Campbell won the Annis Stukus Trophy as the CFL's Coach of the Year on November 26, 2015. This special occasion also marked the first time in CFL history that both a father and son each won the award. Campbell guided the Redblacks to the 103rd Grey Cup game, in which the team fell 26–20 to the Edmonton Eskimos.

Campbell's third season saw the team regress to an 8–9–1 record, but earned a dubious distinction of being the first division champion to win with a sub .500 record. Campbell guided the Redblacks franchise to their first Grey Cup championship, defeating the Calgary Stampeders 39–33 in overtime in the 104th Grey Cup. The victory was the first by an Ottawa franchise since the Ottawa Rough Riders won in 1976.

Campbell's fourth season saw the team finish with an identical 8–9–1 record from the season before, which was good enough for second place in the East Division, behind the Toronto Argonauts. The Redblacks struggled with injuries and inconsistent play throughout the course of the season. Campbell's team lost to the Saskatchewan Roughriders, who crossed over to play the Redblacks in the East Division Semi-final.

Campbell's Redblacks returned to form in his fifth season, winning their third divisional title in four years. The Redblacks defeated the Tiger-Cats in the East Final, before getting defeated by the Calgary Stampeders who were making their third consecutive Grey Cup appearance in the 106th Grey Cup game.

Campbell's final season with the Redblacks was an unmitigated disaster. After a 2–0 start, the team lost four in a row and their final 11 games to finish the season with a 3–15 record. Following the season, Campbell and the Redblacks mutually agreed to part ways. Campbell left the Redblacks with a 44–62–2 record over six seasons with one Grey Cup championship in three appearances.

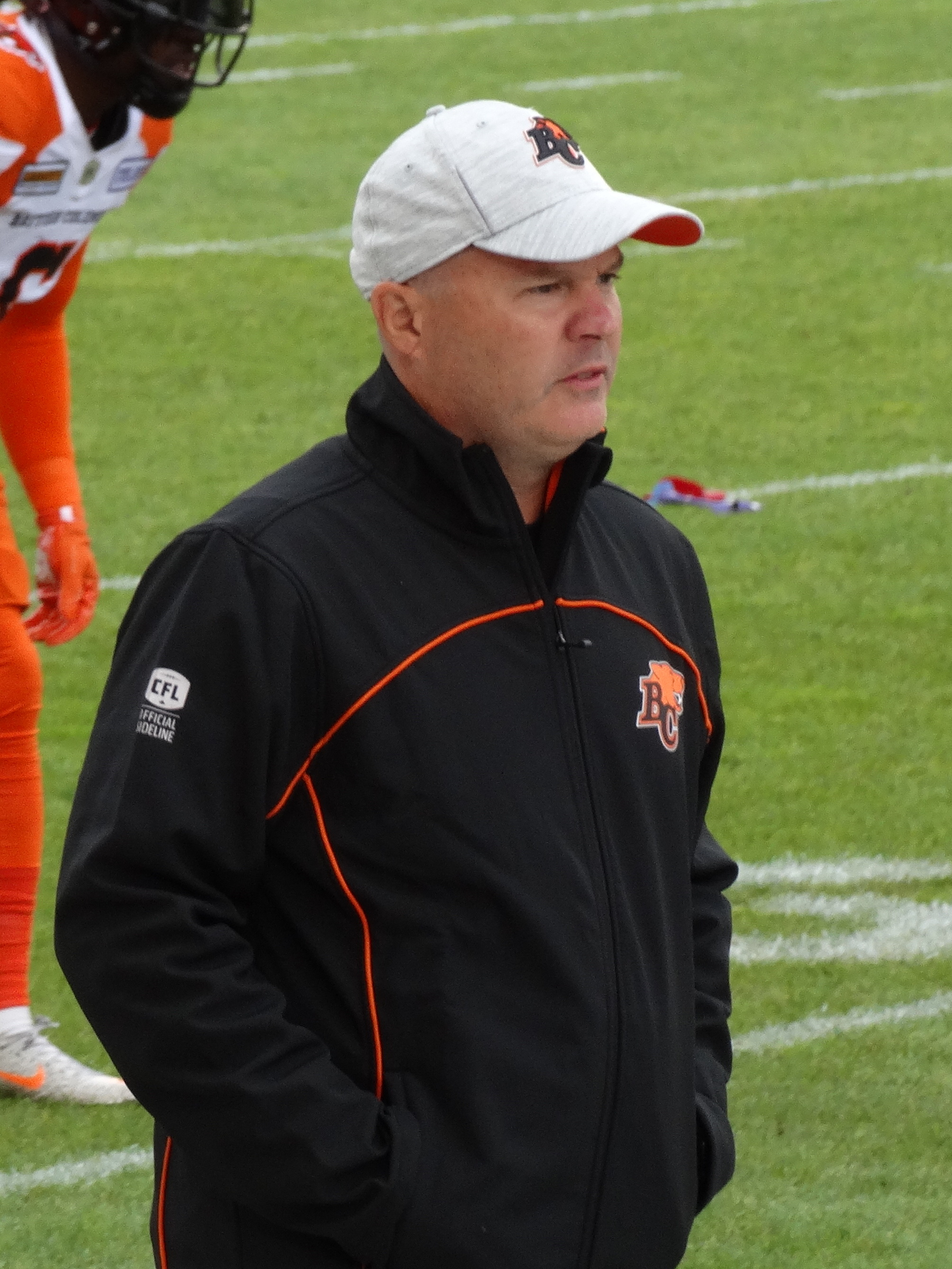
Campbell with the BC Lions in 2022

=== BC Lions ===
On December 2, 2019, Campbell was announced as the head coach for the BC Lions. After the 2020 CFL season was cancelled due to the COVID-19 pandemic, general manager Ed Hervey, who had hired Campbell, resigned from his position and Campbell was named co-general manager of the Lions with Neil McEvoy. Campbell took over a team that finished 5–13 in 2019 and led them to a 5–9 record in a shortened 2021 season. After naming Nathan Rourke as his starting quarterback in 2022, the young pivot had an incredible start to the season, being named the CFL's Most Outstanding Canadian and the Lions finished 12–6 with a home playoff game. With Vernon Adams as the team's starting quarterback, Campbell led the team to another 12–6 finish in 2023, but were defeated in the West Final by the Winnipeg Blue Bombers for the second straight year. In 2024, the Lions began the season 5–1, but stumbled to end the season and finished 9–9 and a third place finish and quick playoff exit in a year where the Lions were hosting the 111th Grey Cup. Consequently, Campbell was relieved of coaching duties on November 20, 2024.

=== Ottawa Redblacks (second stint) ===
On January 9, 2025, it was announced that Campbell had been hired by the Ottawa Redblacks as the team's special teams coordinator. He served in that capacity for one season, but was not retained for 2026 following the hire of Ryan Dinwiddie as head coach.

=== Edmonton Elks ===
On April 1, 2026, the Edmonton Elks announced that Campbell had joined the team as a coaching analyst.

=== Head coaching record ===
Team	Year	Regular season					Postseason		
Team	Year	Won	Lost	Ties	Win %	Finish	Won	Lost	Result
OTT	2014	2	16	0	.111	4th in East Division	–	–	Failed to Qualify
OTT	2015	12	6	0	.666	1st in East Division	1	1	Lost 103rd Grey Cup (EDM)
OTT	2016	8	9	1	.472	1st in East Division	2	0	Won 104th Grey Cup (CGY)
OTT	2017	8	9	1	.472	2nd in East Division	0	1	Lost East Semi-Final (SSK)
OTT	2018	11	7	0	.611	1st in East Division	1	1	Lost 106th Grey Cup (CGY)
OTT	2019	3	15	0	.167	4th in East Division	–	–	Failed to Qualify
BC	2020	Season cancelled							
BC	2021	5	9	0	.357	4th in West Division	–	–	Failed to Qualify
BC	2022	12	6	0	.666	2nd in West Division	1	1	Lost West Final (WPG)
BC	2023	12	6	0	.666	2nd in West Division	1	1	Lost West Final (WPG)
BC	2024	9	9	0	.500	3rd in West Division	0	1	Lost West Semi-Final (SSK)
Total		82	92	2	.472	3 Division Championships	6	6	1 Grey Cup

== Personal life ==
Campbell moved to Ottawa, shortly after his appointment as the Redblacks head coach. After spending the majority of his life in Canada, Campbell became a naturalized Canadian citizen in 2011.
