= Henry Burris =

American gridiron football player and coach (born 1975)

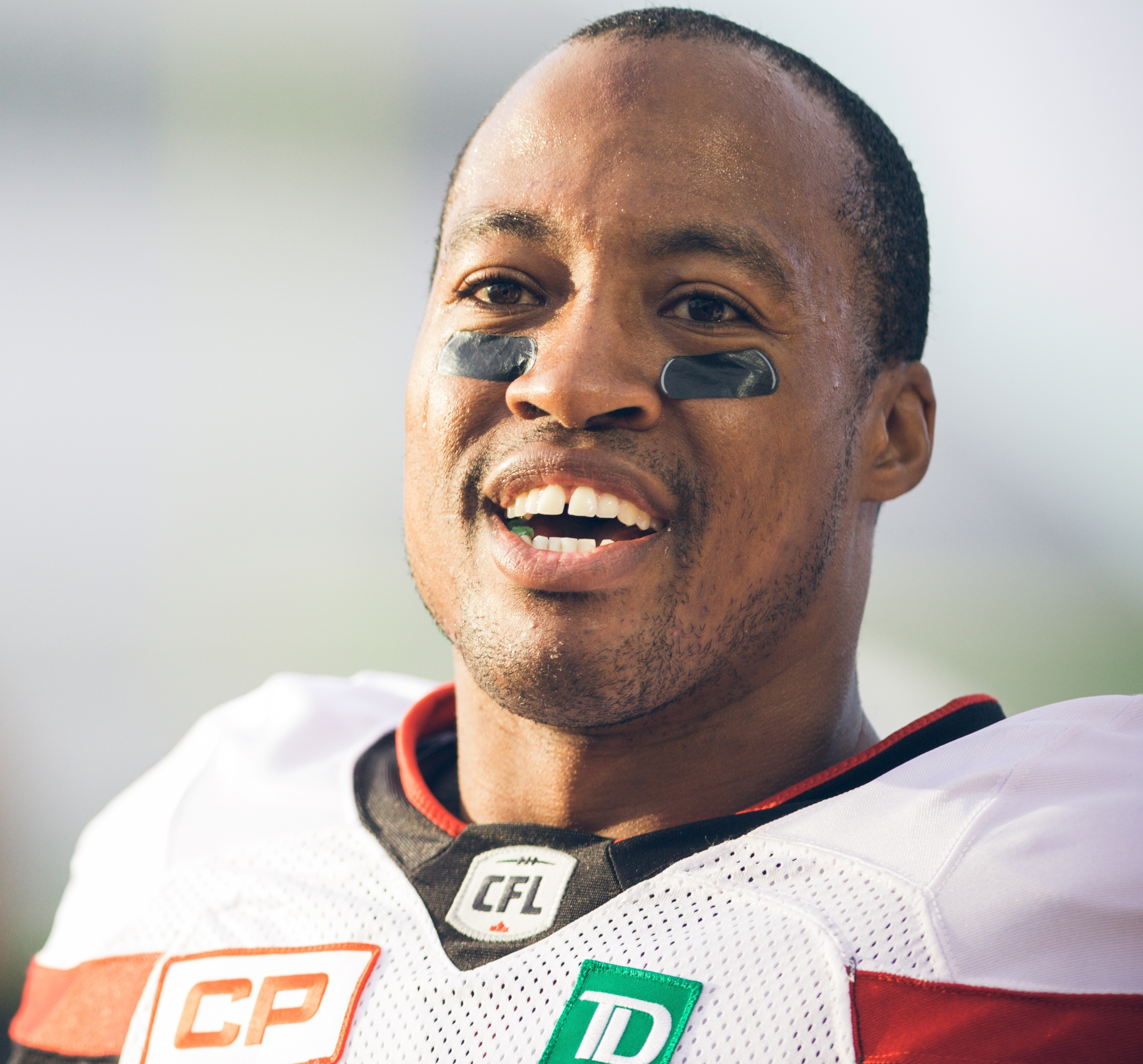
- Burris with the Ottawa Redblacks in 2016

Florida A&M Rattlers
- Title: Co-offensive coordinator & quarterbacks coach

Personal information
- Born: June 4, 1975 (age 51); Spiro, Oklahoma, U.S.
- Listed height: 6 ft 1 in (1.85 m)
- Listed weight: 190 lb (86 kg)

Career information
- Position: Quarterback (No. 16, 1, 10)
- High school: Spiro (OK)
- College: Temple
- NFL draft: 1997: undrafted

Career history

Playing
- Calgary Stampeders (1997–1999); Saskatchewan Roughriders (2000); Green Bay Packers (2001); Chicago Bears (2002); Berlin Thunder (2003); Saskatchewan Roughriders (2003–2004); Calgary Stampeders (2005–2011); Hamilton Tiger-Cats (2012–2013); Ottawa Redblacks (2014–2016)

Coaching
- Chicago Bears (2020) Seasonal coaching assistant; Chicago Bears (2021) Offensive quality control coach; BC Lions (2022) Offensive consultant; Jacksonville Jaguars (2022) Offensive quality control coach; Los Angeles Rams (2023) Tight ends coach (training camp); Florida A&M (2024–present) Co-offensive coordinator & quarterbacks coach

Awards and highlights
- 3× Grey Cup champion (1998, 2008, 2016); 2× Grey Cup MVP (2008, 2016); 2× CFL Most Outstanding Player Award (2010, 2015); 2× Jeff Nicklin Memorial Trophy winner (2008, 2010); Terry Evanshen Trophy winner (2015); 2× CFL All-Star (2010, 2015); 2× CFL East All-Star (2012, 2015); 3× CFL West All-Star (2005, 2008, 2010); CFL single game record for completions (45) (2015); CFL single season record for completions (481) (2015); 3× CFL passing yards leader (2012, 2013, 2015); 4× CFL passing touchdowns leader (2006, 2007, 2010, 2012); Tom Pate Memorial Award (2015)

Career CFL statistics
- Pass attempts: 7,426
- Pass completions: 4,638
- TD–INT: 374–227
- Passing yards: 63,227
- Passer rating: 93.5
- Stats at Pro Football Reference
- Stats at CFL.ca
- Canadian Football Hall of Fame

Henry Armand Burris Jr. (born June 4, 1975) is an American former professional football quarterback, and a member of the Canadian Football Hall of Fame. He is currently the co-offensive coordinator and quarterbacks coach for Florida A&M. Burris played in the Canadian Football League (CFL) from 1998 to 2016. He won three Grey Cup championships, two with the Calgary Stampeders, in 1998 and 2008, having spent 10 years of his career with them, and one with the Ottawa Redblacks in 2016. He was also a sports broadcaster and football analyst at TSN, appearing as a panel member on the network's CFL on TSN broadcasts.

Burris won the CFL's Most Outstanding Player Award in 2010 and 2015. At the time of his retirement Burris was third in all-time CFL passing yards and passing touchdowns. While playing in the CFL, he was also a member of the Saskatchewan Roughriders and Hamilton Tiger-Cats and spent time in the NFL with the Chicago Bears and Green Bay Packers. Prior to his professional career, he played college football with the Temple Owls.

== Early life ==
Burris attended Spiro High School in Spiro, Oklahoma, and won four varsity letters each in football, track, basketball, and baseball. In football, he was named the Oklahoma Offensive Player of the Year as a senior.

Burris attended Temple University and finished with 20 passing records. He left the university ranked second all-time in Big East Conference passing with 7495 yards.

=== College career ===
Season	Team	GP	Passing						
Season	Team	GP	Cmp	Att	Pct	Yds	TD	Int	Rtg
1993	Temple	10	62	149	41.6	691	5	8	80.1
1994	Temple	11	215	409	52.6	2,716	21	12	119.4
1995	Temple	11	139	300	46.3	2,004	11	17	103.2
1996	Temple	11	142	280	50.7	2,084	12	8	121.7
Totals		43	558	1,138	49.0	7,495	49	45	110.7

== Professional career ==
Burris went undrafted in the 1997 NFL draft.

=== Calgary Stampeders (first stint) ===
==== 1997 ====
Burris signed a contract with the CFL's Calgary Stampeders in May 1997. He dressed for one regular season game, and spent the remainder of season on the practice roster.

==== 1998 ====
In 1998, Burris dressed for all 18 regular season games as the Stampeders' third-string quarterback. He gained his first, limited playing time in relief of Jeff Garcia and Dave Dickenson. Burris was also dressed for Calgary's West Final win against Edmonton, as well as the team's Grey Cup win against Hamilton.

==== 1999 ====
In 1999, Garcia joined the San Francisco 49ers. Dickenson became Calgary's starting quarterback, and Burris received more playing time as Dickenson's backup. He replaced Dickenson in the third week game against the Edmonton Eskimos, leading the Stampeders to a come-from-behind victory. Burris started the following two games against the Montreal Alouettes and BC Lions, leading the Stampeders to another victory in the former. He was injured in the third quarter of the latter, and spent the rest of the season on the injured reserve with a torn anterior cruciate ligament.

=== Saskatchewan Roughriders (first stint) ===
==== 2000 ====
On March 9, 2000, Burris signed with the Saskatchewan Roughriders for his first opportunity to be a full-time starting quarterback. He was reunited with Roy Shivers, the team's new general manager, who had been Calgary's Assistant General Manager and Director of Player Personnel in the late 1990s, and Danny Barrett, the team's new head coach, who had been Calgary's Quarterbacks Coach when Burris joined the Stampeders in 1997.

Burris had worn number 16 in Calgary. Before the 2000 season, a poll was held for fans to determine Burris' number in Saskatchewan. The fans chose number 1.

Burris started the first 16 games of the Roughriders season, throwing for 4,647 yards (second in the CFL) and 30 touchdowns (third in the CFL). In game 16, he injured his shoulder, and was replaced by Marvin Graves for the final two regular season games. Despite Saskatchewan finishing the season with a league-worst 5-12-1 record, Burris threw 3 touchdown passes in 3 different games, and for 300 yards 7 times, 2 of which were over 400 yards.

=== Green Bay Packers ===
The Green Bay Packers took interest in him after the CFL season ended, and signed him to a contract. Burris began playing in the NFL in 2001, when he spent several weeks as the Packers' third-string quarterback, without playing in a game, before he was released, and then he spent the rest of the season on their practice squad.

=== Chicago Bears ===
He was signed by the Chicago Bears in the off-season. In six games for the Bears he completed 18 of 51 passes for 207 yards, with three touchdowns and five interceptions. He received significant playing time only in the last two games of the regular season. He was 8 of 22 for 50 yards and a touchdown against Carolina, fumbling twice, and 7 of 19 for 78 yards and four interceptions against Tampa Bay, for a 10.3 quarterback rating. While his passing was quite poor he showed better than average running ability for a quarterback, finishing the 2002 season with 15 rushes for 104 yards.

=== Berlin Thunder ===
The Bears assigned him to NFL Europe's Berlin Thunder in 2003 where he performed respectably. Unhappy with being relegated to Berlin by the Bears, he returned to the CFL and the Roughriders, his former club. He immediately became Nealon Greene's back-up. A knee injury forced him to miss the better part of the season.

=== Saskatchewan Roughriders (second stint) ===
==== 2003 ====
On July 28, 2003, Burris signed with the Roughriders for his second stint with the team. That year, he wore number 10 instead of the number 1 he had worn with the Roughriders in 2000. Defensive back LaDouphyous McCalla had been wearing number 1 since 2001.

Burris dressed for 10 regular season and 2 playoff games that season. He saw action in 2 regular season games, with his most significant game action coming in the Labour Day Classic; Burris replaced starting quarterback Nealon Greene for the second half. Saskatchewan lost 36-18 against Winnipeg, with Burris' passing statistics being 11 of 22 for 130 yards, and a late touchdown pass to Chris Szarka.

==== 2004 ====
In 2004, Burris returned to wearing number 1, and McCalla changed his number to 22. Saskatchewan traded quarterback Kevin Glenn, who had been with the Roughriders since 2001. Going into game 1 against the Toronto Argonauts, Greene was slated to be the number 1 quarterback. Although Burris was listed as the back up, a high left ankle sprain was keeping him out of full workouts, meaning Rocky Butler, who had been in Saskatchewan since 2002, would be the next quarterback on the depth chart.

In the game against Toronto, Burris was the holder on field goals. Greene started, but broke his leg in the first quarter, and was replaced by Butler. Butler struggled against the Argonauts, throwing 2 interceptions in 21-10 loss. Five days later, the Roughriders hosted the Calgary Stampeders in the Roughriders' home opener. Butler started and threw 4 interceptions, and Saskatchewan lost 33-10.

In Saskatchewan's third game, at home against the BC Lions, Burris was healthy enough to start. He threw four touchdowns en route to a 42-29 Saskatchewan victory.

Burris ultimately started 16 regular season games that year. Despite the Roughriders starting 4-8, the team was able to win five games in a row late in the season, and qualify for third place in the West Division. Saskatchewan defeated Edmonton in the West Semi-Final at Commonwealth Stadium 14-6, and Burris threw 2 touchdowns. In the West Final, Burris threw for 416 yards and three touchdowns in Saskatchewan's 27-25 overtime loss in BC.

In February 2005, Burris became a free agent.

=== Calgary Stampeders (second stint) ===
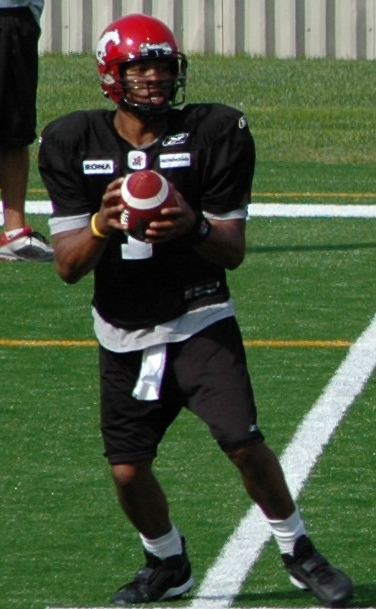
Burris with the Calgary Stampeders in 2006

==== 2005 ====
In the 2005 off-season, Burris rejected the Roughriders' contract offer in order to re-join the Calgary Stampeders. That year, he continued to wear number 1 as had in Saskatchewan, instead of the number 16 he had worn in his first stint with the Stampeders.

Calgary improved its record from 4-14 to 11-7 and finished second in the West. Burris was named the CFL West All-Star quarterback.

The Stampeders hosted Edmonton in the Western Semifinal. In that game, Calgary built up a 23-9 lead in the second quarter, but would go on to lose 33-26.

==== 2006 ====
In 2006, Burris once again helped the Stampeders advance to the CFL playoffs, hosting their second home playoff game in as many years. In the West Semi-Final, the Stampeders hosted Burris' former team, the Saskatchewan Roughriders. Calgary built up a 21-5 second quarter lead, but lost 30-21. Burris threw 4 interceptions and lost a fumble in the game.

==== 2007 ====
In 2007, Burris led the CFL in touchdown passes (34), and finished second in passing yards (4279). Calgary finished third in the West, and once again faced off against the Roughriders in the Western Semifinal (this time played at Mosaic Stadium in Regina, where the Roughriders were hosting their first home playoff game since 1988). Burris once again lost to his former team in a close 26–24 affair.

==== 2008 ====
In 2008, John Hufnagel replaced Tom Higgins as the Stampeder head coach. That season, the Stampeders finished with a league-best 13-5 record. Burris was the CFL West All-Star quarterback and the West nominee for Most Outstanding Player. He won his first championship as a starter, leading the Calgary Stampeders to a 22–14 Grey Cup victory over the host Montreal Alouettes. Burris also captured the title of Grey Cup Most Valuable Player.

==== 2009 ====
In 2009, Burris led the Calgary Stampeders to a second-place finish in the Western Conference. Trying to atone for a year in which he could not beat the first place Saskatchewan Roughriders (0–3–1), the Burris led Stampeders could not defeat the Roughriders in the Western Division Final, falling 27–17. This was Burris' third straight play-off loss to the Roughriders, and denied the Stampeders the chance to play in the Grey Cup to be played in Calgary.

==== 2010 ====
Burris quarterbacked the Stampeders to a CFL best record of 13–5 in 2010. He was the CFL All-Star quarterback and won the CFL Most Outstanding Player award. Looking for revenge against his play-off nemesis, Burris lost to the Roughriders for the fourth time in the post season, 20–16.

==== 2011 ====
Burris started the first 15 regular season games of 2011. However, in the 15th game, Burris was replaced at halftime by Drew Tate. The following week, against Saskatchewan, Burris' string of 69 consecutive starts ended, and Tate got his first CFL start. Tate started the last three regular season games and the West Semi-Final with Burris performing short-yardage duties as the back-up quarterback. This was the first time since 2003 that Burris did not pass for 4000 yards in a CFL season. Burris returned to quarterbacking the Calgary Stampeders in the second half of the Western Conference Semi Finals against the Edmonton Eskimos. He was unable to lead a second half comeback throwing only 7 completions in 15 attempts with 0 touchdowns, having to settle for multiple field goals.

Entering the off-season, there had been much speculation regarding the future of Burris with the Calgary Stampeders. The Stampeders seemed ready to move on and hand the starting job to Drew Tate while Burris had stated that he did not want to be a backup quarterback. The Calgary Stampeders confirmed on January 3, 2012, that they had traded Burris to the Hamilton Tiger-Cats for quarterback Kevin Glenn and offensive lineman Mark Dewit.

=== Hamilton Tiger-Cats ===
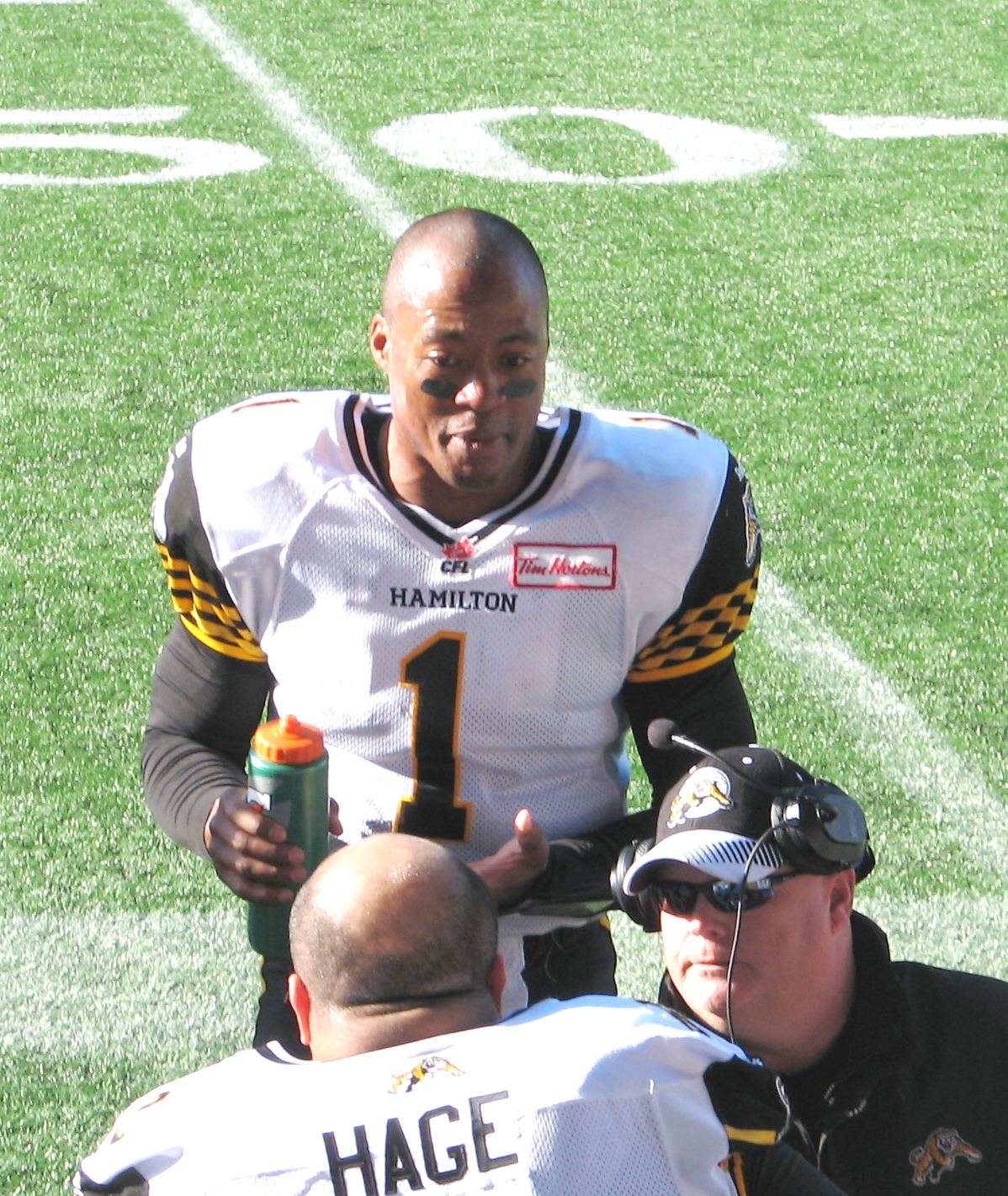
Burris with the Hamilton Tiger-Cats in 2013

==== 2012 ====
In his first season with the Tiger-Cats, Burris had a career year. He threw for 5,367 yards and 43 touchdowns, with a passer rating of 104.4, all career highs. Unfortunately, the Tiger-Cats defense struggled, giving up an average of 32 points per game, which resulted in the team falling to 6–12 and missing the playoffs.

==== 2013 ====
On September 13, 2013, midway through the 2013 CFL season, Burris became the 5th CFL quarterback to throw for 50,000 career passing yards. Burris' 4,925 passing yards was enough to lead the league in passing for the second consecutive year. Burris led the Tiger-Cats into the post-season with a record of 10–8, they defeated the Montreal Alouettes and then the Toronto Argonauts, but ultimately lost to the Saskatchewan Roughriders in the 101st Grey Cup game. Entering the off-season, Burris was set to become a free-agent in February 2014 unless he re-signed with the Tiger-Cats. He expressed his desire to stay with the Ti-Cats, saying, "I want to be back here, we've had a great run. I still feel like I can get it done." However, Burris was released by Hamilton on January 30, 2014, following the signing of Zach Collaros.

=== Ottawa Redblacks ===
==== 2014 ====
On February 4, 2014, Burris signed a three-year contract with the Ottawa Redblacks. The 2014 CFL season was Burris' worst season statistically since his 2003 year with the Roughriders. Burris led the inaugural season of the RedBlacks to a 2–16 record. His completion percentage was his lowest since 2009, and only managed to score 11 touchdowns in 18 games, while throwing 14 interceptions. He threw the first passing touchdown in Redblacks history in their first game on July 3, 2014, against the Winnipeg Blue Bombers. He also led the team to their first victory during their first home game of the season on July 18, 2014, against the Toronto Argonauts.

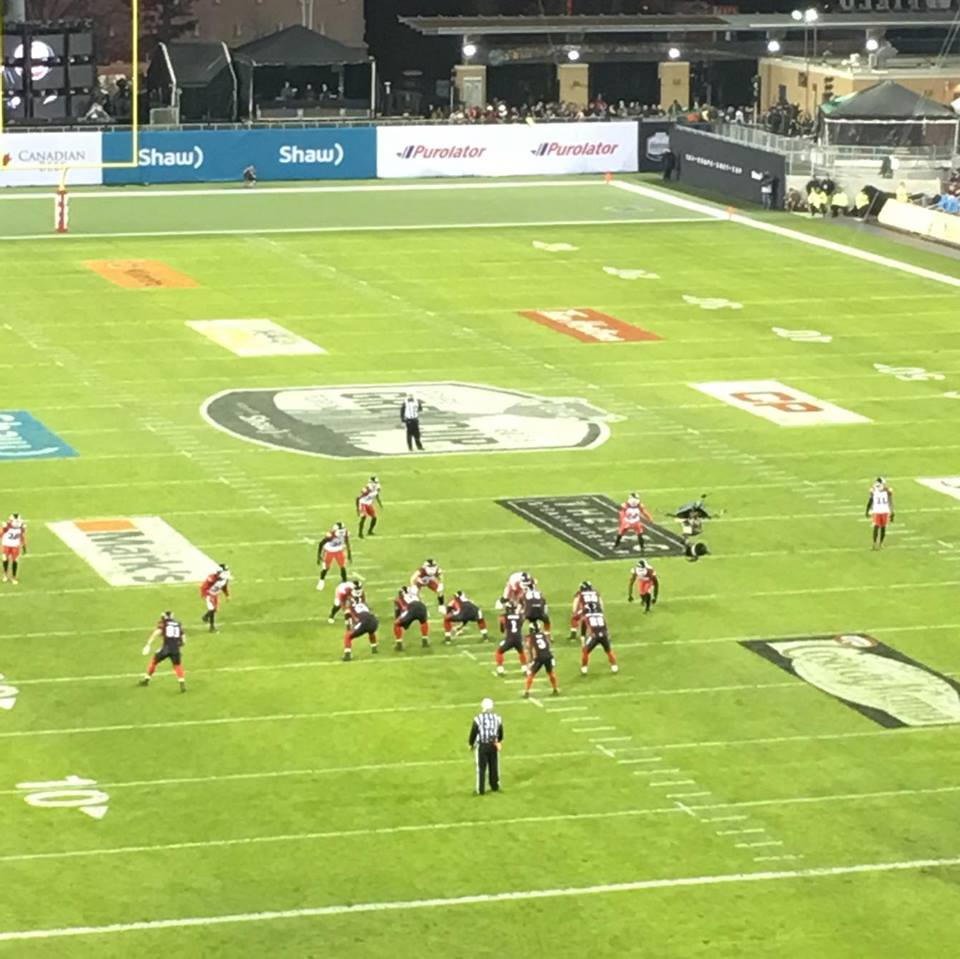
Burris (1) leading the Redblacks on offense against the Calgary Stampeders in the 104th Grey Cup

==== 2015 ====
Burris returned as the starter for the 2015 season and was the only quarterback in the league to start all 18 games that year. With the addition of offensive coordinator, Jason Maas, and several key free agent signings, Burris experienced a renaissance season. On October 1, 2015, Burris set a CFL record for completions in a game connecting on 45 passes for a career-high 504 passing yards. On November 7, 2015, Burris became the CFL's record holder for most completions in a season with 481 completions. Additionally, Burris finished the 2015 season as the league leader in passing yards and completion percentage. He led the RedBlacks to a record of 12–6, earning a first round bye in the process. In the Eastern Final, Burris lead the Redblacks over his old team, the Tiger-Cats, personally advancing to the Grey Cup for the second time in three seasons. Prior to the Grey Cup, he was named the CFL's Most Outstanding Player for 2015.

==== 2016 ====
Burris left the 2016 season opening game in the third quarter after injuring the pinky finger on his throwing hand. He was replaced by backup quarterback Trevor Harris who was brought in as a free-agent during the offseason to replace the 41-year old Burris in the event of an injury or diminished performance. Initially it was reported that Burris would miss only one game, however he was quickly transferred to the six-game injured list. After an injury to backup quarterback Harris, Burris returned early from his hand injury to play in Weeks 6 and 7. In a halftime interview during their Week 7 match against the Eskimos Henry Burris sounded off in response to criticism from some of the TSN staff regarding his poor performance in Week 6 and the impressive play by Harris before his injury. He was quoted as saying, "So all the people talking junk out there, you can take that and shove it. All right? That's all I have to say". Following a bye in Week 8 Burris started in Week 9 but was once again unable to lead the Redblacks to victory. Harris returned to the starting lineup from Week 10 through 15 with mixed results. Burris returned to the starting role in Week 17 (the fourth last week of the regular season). Ottawa split their remaining 4 games, winning 2 and losing 2 to finish below .500 with a record of 8–9–1. This was the first time in CFL history that a team with a losing record finished first in their division. Following their first round bye Burris led the Redblacks to an East Division Final victory over the Edmonton Eskimos in a snowstorm, advancing the team to its second consecutive Grey Cup game. In the 104th Grey Cup, Despite suffering a slight knee injury during warmups, Burris passed for 461 yards and 3 touchdowns leading the Redblacks to a 39–33 over time win over the Calgary Stampeders to win the Grey Cup for Ottawa for the first time in 40 years. At the Grey Cup parade two days following the victory Burris was in crutches stating he would likely need surgery to repair his knee which he injured in warm-ups before the Grey Cup game. He also told the 40,000 fans in attendance that he would delay his decision regarding the future of his playing career until January 2017.

On January 19, 2017, it was reported that Burris was leaning towards retirement, citing the desire to spend more time with his wife and help raise their children; while at the same time wanting to play in 2017 to help Ottawa win back-to-back championships at the 105th Grey Cup in Ottawa. On January 24, 2017, he officially announced his retirement at a press conference. He was inducted into the Canadian Football Hall of Fame as a member of the class of 2020.

== Career statistics ==
=== Regular season ===
		Passing									Rushing
Year	Team	Games	Started	Comp	Att	Pct	Yards	TD	Int	Rating	Att	Yards	Avg	Long	TD	Fumb
1997	CGY	1	0	0	0		0	0	0		0	0	0	0	0	0
1998	CGY	18	0	5	11	45.5	83	0	1	33.5	2	4	2.0	2	0	0
1999	CGY	5	2	36	60	60	529	4	4	83.3	13	81	6.2	16	0	1
2000	SSK	18	16	308	576	53.5	4,647	30	25	79.5	68	188	2.8	17	8	12
2001	GB	0	0	0	0		0	0	0		0	0	0	0	0	0
2002	CHI	6	1	18	51	35.3	207	3	5	28.4	15	104	6.9	17	0	1
2003	BER	6	6	55	99	55.6	589	5	5	69.0	7	59	8.4	26	2	–
2003	SSK	10	0	11	24	45.8	130	1	0	76.7	2	16	8.0	9	0	0
2004	SSK	18	16	322	544	59.2	4,267	23	18	84.4	84	464	5.5	34	7	14
2005	CGY	16	15	265	435	60.9	4,290	23	12	100.1	82	513	6.3	31	9	15
2006	CGY	18	18	305	537	56.8	4,453	23	18	84.3	70	480	6.9	21	5	7
2007	CGY	16	14	285	471	60.5	4,279	34	14	102.0	84	623	7.3	39	5	6
2008	CGY	18	18	381	591	64.4	5,094	39	14	103.8	87	595	6.8	35	3	9
2009	CGY	18	18	339	571	59.4	4,831	22	16	88.0	105	552	5.3	30	11	8
2010	CGY	18	18	370	559	66.2	4,945	38	20	101.9	70	491	7.0	27	3	6
2011	CGY	18	15	281	442	63.6	3,687	20	12	93.6	51	385	7.5	34	4	13
2012	HAM	18	18	391	604	64.7	5,367	43	18	104.4	45	343	7.6	23	0	11
2013	HAM	18	18	374	568	65.8	4,927	24	19	93.2	46	298	6.4	19	0	6
2014	OTT	18	18	315	517	60.9	3,728	11	14	78.7	57	258	4.5	20	2	6
2015	OTT	18	18	481	678	70.9	5,693	26	13	101.0	75	274	3.7	14	7	10
2016	OTT	13	7	180	264	68.2	2,419	12	9	98.0	21	88	4.2	11	4	6
CFL totals		277	229	4,649	7,452	62.4	63,369	373	227	93.5	963	5,653	5.9	34	68	130
Pro totals		283	230	4,666	7,503	62.0	63,576	376	232	93.1	978	5,757	5.9	34	68	131

- Games mean "Dressed For", not "Played In"
- Pro totals include CFL and NFL totals only

=== Playoffs ===
Year & game	Team	GP	GS	ATT	COMP	YD	TD	INT	RUSH	YD	TD
1997 West Semi-Final	CGY	0	-	-	-	-	-	-	-	-	-
1998 West Final	CGY	1	0	0	-	-	-	-	0	-	-
1999 West Semi-Final	CGY	0	-	-	-	-	-	-	-	-	-
1999 West Final	CGY	0	-	-	-	-	-	-	-	-	-
2003 West Semi-Final	SSK	1	0	0	-	-	-	-	0	-	-
2003 West Final	SSK	1	0	0	-	-	-	-	0	-	-
2004 West Semi-Final	SSK	1	1	28	15	158	2	0	3	24	0
2004 West Final	SSK	1	1	39	28	416	3	0	4	24	0
2005 West Semi-Final	CGY	1	1	20	11	242	0	2	7	25	2
2006 West Semi-Final	CGY	1	1	32	16	198	0	4	6	37	1
2007 West Semi-Final	CGY	1	1	36	20	323	2	1	5	22	0
2008 West Final	CGY	1	1	27	17	236	1	1	9	32	1
2009 West Semi-Final	CGY	1	1	32	19	264	2	0	7	63	0
2009 West Final	CGY	1	1	34	22	278	1	3	4	33	0
2010 West Final	CGY	1	1	28	19	229	1	1	1	1	0
2011 West Semi-Final	CGY	1	0	15	7	75	0	0	5	31	0
2013 East Semi-Final	HAM	1	1	36	23	204	1	1	0	-	-
2013 East Final	HAM	1	1	40	27	371	3	1	5	51	0
2015 East Final	OTT	1	1	32	17	326	1	0	6	29	1
2016 East Final	OTT	1	1	26	15	246	2	1	3	8	0
Totals		17	13	425	256	3566	19	15	65	380	5

=== Grey Cup ===
Year	Team	GP	GS	ATT	COMP	YD	TD	INT	RUSH	YD	TD
1998	CGY	1	0	0	-	-	-	-	0	-	-
1999	CGY	0	-	-	-	-	-	-	-	-	-
2008	CGY	1	1	37	28	328	1	1	9	79	0
2013	HAM	1	1	43	20	272	0	1	2	34	1
2015	OTT	1	1	29	22	220	2	1	2	6	0
2016	OTT	1	1	46	35	461	3	1	3	3	2
Totals		5	4	155	105	1281	6	4	16	122	3

== Broadcast career ==
On February 21, 2017, Burris began his broadcasting career and joined CTV Morning Live Ottawa as one of the show's hosts. After two years, Burris announced he would be leaving CTV Morning Live Ottawa, but would continue to be heard on TSN Radio's TSN 1200. Burris was a football analyst at TSN and a panel member on the network's CFL on TSN broadcasts.

== Coaching career ==
=== Chicago Bears ===
Burris joined the coaching staff of the Chicago Bears for the team's 2020 training camp as part of the Bill Walsh diversity coaching fellowship. Burris remained with the team for the duration of the 2020 season as a seasonal coaching assistant. He was promoted to a full-time position as offensive quality control coach on January 25, 2021.

=== BC Lions ===
On March 15, 2022, Burris joined the BC Lions as an offensive consultant. After only 10 days on the job it was announced that Burris was leaving the Lions to pursue an NFL opportunity.

=== Jacksonville Jaguars ===
Burris spent the 2022 season as an Offensive Quality Control coach for the Jacksonville Jaguars after not being retained by Matt Eberflus who became coach of the Chicago Bears following the firing of Matt Nagy. 2022 saw the Jaguars made a large turn around on offense, spurred by the development of second year quarterback Trevor Lawrence and a breakout season by WR Christian Kirk.

=== Los Angeles Rams ===
After not being retained by the Jaguars for the 2023 season, Burris joined the Los Angeles Rams for training camp in 2023 as a tight ends coach.

=== Florida A&M ===
In April 2024, Burris was named the co-offensive coordinator and quarterbacks coach for Florida A&M.

== Personal life ==
Burris is married to Nicole Burris and they are the parents of two boys: Armand, who plays football at Florida A&M University, and Barron who is in high school. He was granted permanent residency in Canada on April 28, 2017, after a long bureaucratic hurdle.

== See also ==
- List of Canadian Football League records (individual)
- List of gridiron football quarterbacks passing statistics
