= Jasper Simmons =

Canadian football player (born 1989)

Profile
- Position: Linebacker

Personal information
- Born: August 20, 1989 (age 37); Pensacola, Florida
- Listed height: 6 ft 1 in (1.85 m)
- Listed weight: 223 lb (101 kg)

Career information
- College: Missouri

Career history
- 2011–2012: Toronto Argonauts
- 2014: Ottawa Redblacks
- 2015: Calgary Stampeders
- 2015: Winnipeg Blue Bombers
- Stats at CFL.ca

Jasper Simmons (born August 20, 1989) is a Canadian football linebacker. He played for the Calgary Stampeders and the Ottawa Redblacks of the Canadian Football League (CFL). He played college football at Missouri.

== College career ==
Simmons attended Hutchinson Community College for two years before attending the University of Missouri in 2009 and 2010. As a senior, he was suspended indefinitely by Missouri.

== Professional career ==
=== Toronto Argonauts ===
Simmons signed with the Toronto Argonauts of the Canadian Football League in 2011. He saw limited playing time in two seasons with the Argos; totaling only 6 defensive tackles, 4 special teams tackles and 2 interceptions.

=== Ottawa RedBlacks ===
In 2014, he signed with the Ottawa Redblacks. That season, he led the RedBlacks in tackles with 80, and also had 2 interceptions for 61 yards.

=== Calgary Stampeders ===
On January 15, 2015, the Ottawa RedBlacks traded Jasper Simmons and WR Dan Buckner to the Stampeders in exchange for WR Maurice Price. He was released by the Stampeders on August 18, 2015.

=== Winnipeg Blue Bombers ===
Simmon signed with the Winnipeg Blue Bombers on August 19, 2015.
