= David Hinds (gridiron football) =

American gridiron football player (born 1990)

No. 20
- Position: Linebacker

Personal information
- Born: February 25, 1990 (age 36); Kingston, Jamaica
- Listed height: 6 ft 2 in (1.88 m)
- Listed weight: 234 lb (106 kg)

Career information
- High school: Edison (Miami, Florida)
- College: Florida Atlantic

Career history
- 2013: Miami Dolphins*
- 2014: Tennessee Titans*
- 2014: Miami Dolphins*
- 2014–2016: Ottawa Redblacks
- * Offseason or practice squad member only
- Stats at Pro Football Reference

David Hinds (born February 25, 1990) is a Jamaican-American former professional football linebacker who played for the Ottawa Redblacks of the Canadian Football League (CFL). He played college football at Florida Atlantic. He was also a member of the Tennessee Titans and Miami Dolphins of the National Football League (NFL).

== Early life ==
Hinds was born in Kingston, Jamaica and moved to Miami, Florida when he was two years old. He participated in football, basketball, and track at Miami Edison High School. He only played football his senior year, when he recorded 107 tackles, three sacks, four interceptions, two forced fumbles, one fumble recovery and one touchdown.

== College career ==
Hinds played for the Florida Atlantic from 2009 to 2012. He led the team with 110 tackles in 2011.

== Professional career ==
After going undrafted in the 2013 NFL draft, Hinds was invited to rookie minicamp with the Miami Dolphins on a tryout basis. Due to a strong performance, the Dolphins signed him to a contract on May 5, 2013. He was waived by the Dolphins on August 27, 2013.

Hinds signed a futures contract with the Tennessee Titans on January 8, 2014. He was waived by the Titans on August 26, 2014.

Hinds was signed to the practice squad of the Dolphins on August 31, 2014. He was released on September 4, 2014.

Hinds was signed to the practice roster of the Ottawa Redblacks on September 15, 2014. He played in two games, starting one, for the Redblacks in 2014, recording six tackles on defense. He appeared in 14 games, starting seven, in 2015, totaling 41 tackles on defense, four special teams tackles, two sacks and one pass breakup. Hinds played in nine games, all starts, for the Redblacks in 2016, accumulating 34 tackles on defense, one special teams tackle and one interception. He was released on August 28, 2016 after John Boyett was moved to linebacker.
