= Scott MacDonell =

Canadian gridiron football player (born 1991)

No. 83
- Position: Slotback

Personal information
- Born: April 18, 1991 (age 35)
- Listed height: 6 ft 5 in (1.96 m)
- Listed weight: 220 lb (100 kg)

Career information
- High school: Phillips Exeter Academy (Exeter, New Hampshire, U. S.)
- University: Queen's (2011–2013)
- CFL draft: 2014: 2nd round, 13th overall pick

Career history
- Ottawa Redblacks (2014–2016); Edmonton Eskimos (2017)*; Montreal Alouettes (2017)*; Ottawa Redblacks (2017)*; Edmonton Eskimos (2018)*
- * Offseason or practice squad member only

Awards and highlights
- Grey Cup champion (2016)

Career CFL statistics
- Games played: 55
- Receptions: 16
- Receiving yards: 221
- Receiving average: 13.8
- Receiving touchdowns: 1
- Stats at CFL.ca

Scott MacDonell (born April 18, 1991) is a Canadian former professional football slotback who played in the Canadian Football League (CFL) with the Ottawa Redblacks and Edmonton Eskimos. He played CIS football for the Queen's Gaels.

== Early life ==
MacDonell was born on April 18, 1991, and grew up in Côte-des-Neiges, a neighbourhood of Montreal, Quebec. He attended Phillips Exeter Academy in Exeter, New Hampshire, U. S.

== College career ==
MacDonell played CIS football for the Queen's Gaels from 2011 to 2013. He played in 20 games, where he caught 75 passes for 909 yards and four touchdowns.

== Professional career ==
=== Ottawa Redblacks (first stint) ===
MacDonell was selected in the second round, with the 13th overall selection, by the Ottawa Redblacks in the 2014 CFL draft. As a rookie, he had 13 receptions for 181 yards and one touchdowns in 16 games. In the next two seasons, MacDonell only had three catches for 40 yards in 39 games. He was a member of the team as they defeated the Calgary Stampeders 39–33 in the 104th Grey Cup. MacDonell became a free agent at the end of the season. On February 21, 2017, he signed a one-year extension with the Redblacks. On June 5, MacDonell was released by the team.

=== Edmonton Eskimos (first stint) ===
On June 14, 2017, MacDonell was signed by the Edmonton Eskimos. On June 18, he was assigned to the practice roster. On August 20, MacDonell was released.

=== Montreal Alouettes ===
On August 27, 2017, the Montreal Alouettes signed MacDonell to the practice roster. He was released on September 15.

=== Ottawa Redblacks (second stint) ===
On September 25, 2017, MacDonell was signed again by the Ottawa Redblacks to the practice roster.

=== Edmonton Eskimos (second stint) ===
On May 17, 2018, the Edmonton Eskimos signed MacDonell. On June 10, he was released by the team.
