= Dan Buckner =

American gridiron football player (born 1990)

No. 9, 12
- Position: Wide receiver

Personal information
- Born: May 31, 1990 (age 36); Allen, Texas, U.S.
- Listed height: 6 ft 4 in (1.93 m)
- Listed weight: 215 lb (98 kg)

Career information
- High school: Allen (Allen, Texas)
- College: Arizona, Texas
- NFL draft: 2013: undrafted

Career history
- Arizona Cardinals (2013)*; Tampa Bay Buccaneers (2013)*; Arizona Cardinals (2013–2014)*; Ottawa Redblacks (2014); Calgary Stampeders (2015)*; Arizona Rattlers (2015–2016); Los Angeles KISS (2016); Arizona Rattlers (2016)*
- * Offseason or practice squad member only

Career AFL statistics
- Receptions: 27
- Receiving yards: 308
- Receiving touchdowns: 3
- Stats at ArenaFan.com
- Stats at Pro Football Reference
- Stats at CFL.ca (archive)

Dan Buckner (born May 31, 1990) is an American former professional football wide receiver. He played college football at the University of Arizona, and before that for the University of Texas at Austin where he played in the 2010 BCS National Championship Game. Buckner was a member of the Arizona Cardinals, Tampa Bay Buccaneers, Ottawa Redblacks, Calgary Stampeders, Arizona Rattlers, and Los Angeles KISS.

== Early life ==
Buckner was a five-star recruit out of Allen High School and received scholarship offers from Baylor, Nebraska, Texas, Notre Dame and Oklahoma, among others.

== College career ==
Buckner played college football at the University of Texas in 2008 and 2009. In his freshman year, he saw limited playing time, catching only 5 passes for 2 touchdowns as Texas won a share of the Big 12 South and then the Fiesta Bowl. In 2009 he started the season as one of Colt McCoy's primary targets, catching 29 receptions for 4 touchdowns in the first 5 games, including a stretch of 3 consecutive games with a touchdown making him only the 6th player in school history to do that, but he had only seven catches over the final four games of the season as his flex end position was gradually phased out of the Longhorns' attack by offensive coordinator Greg Davis. He helped Texas to win the Big 12 Championship and attend the BCS championship game in which he caught just 1 pass for -3 yards.

A few weeks after the BCS Championship game, Buckner was arrested in College Station, Texas, on charges of criminal trespassing and resisting arrest and less than one day later he transferred to Arizona.

After sitting out the 2010 season as a redshirt for transferring, Buckner played two years at Arizona. In two seasons he had 103 receptions for 1,379 yards and 7 touchdowns. He was 2nd in receiving yards for the Wildcats in 2012 and 9th in the Pac-12 as he helped the team to an 8-5 record and a victory over Nevada in the 2012 New Mexico Bowl.

== Professional career ==
=== Arizona Cardinals (first stint) ===
On April 27, 2013, Buckner signed with the Arizona Cardinals as an undrafted free agent following the 2013 NFL draft and then released at the end of camp. He was signed to the practice squad on September 17, 2013 and released a few days later on September 21.

=== Tampa Bay Buccaneers ===
On September 24, 2013, Buckner was signed to the Tampa Bay Buccaneers' practice squad and then released on October 1st.

=== Arizona Cardinals (second stint) ===
Buckner was signed to the Cardinals practice squad again on November 5th, 2013 and stayed with them through the season and signed with them again during the offseason. He was again cut at the end of camp in 2014.

=== Ottawa Redblacks ===
Buckner signed with the Ottawa Redblacks on October 7, 2014. Buckner dressed for two games with the RedBlacks, but did not catch any passes though he was thrown a pass.

=== Calgary Stampeders ===
On January 15, 2015, the Ottawa RedBlacks traded LB Jasper Simmons and Dan Buckner to the Stampeders in exchange for WR Maurice Price. He was released in camp that summer.

=== Arizona Rattlers (first stint) ===
On July 8, 2015, two weeks after being cut by the Stampeders, Buckner was signed by the Arizona Rattlers of the Arena Football League. He played 5 games with Arizona in the 2015 season catching 26 receptions for 304 yards and 3 TDS.

=== Los Angeles KISS ===
On April 14, 2016, Buckner was assigned to the Los Angeles KISS. On May 24, 2016, Buckner was placed on recallable reassignment. He had only 1 reception with the KISS.

=== Arizona Rattlers (second stint) ===
On June 6, 2016, Buckner returned to the Rattlers where he played primarily on defense and helped them to make it to ArenaBowl XXIX.
