= Antoine Pruneau =

Canadian football player (born 1989)

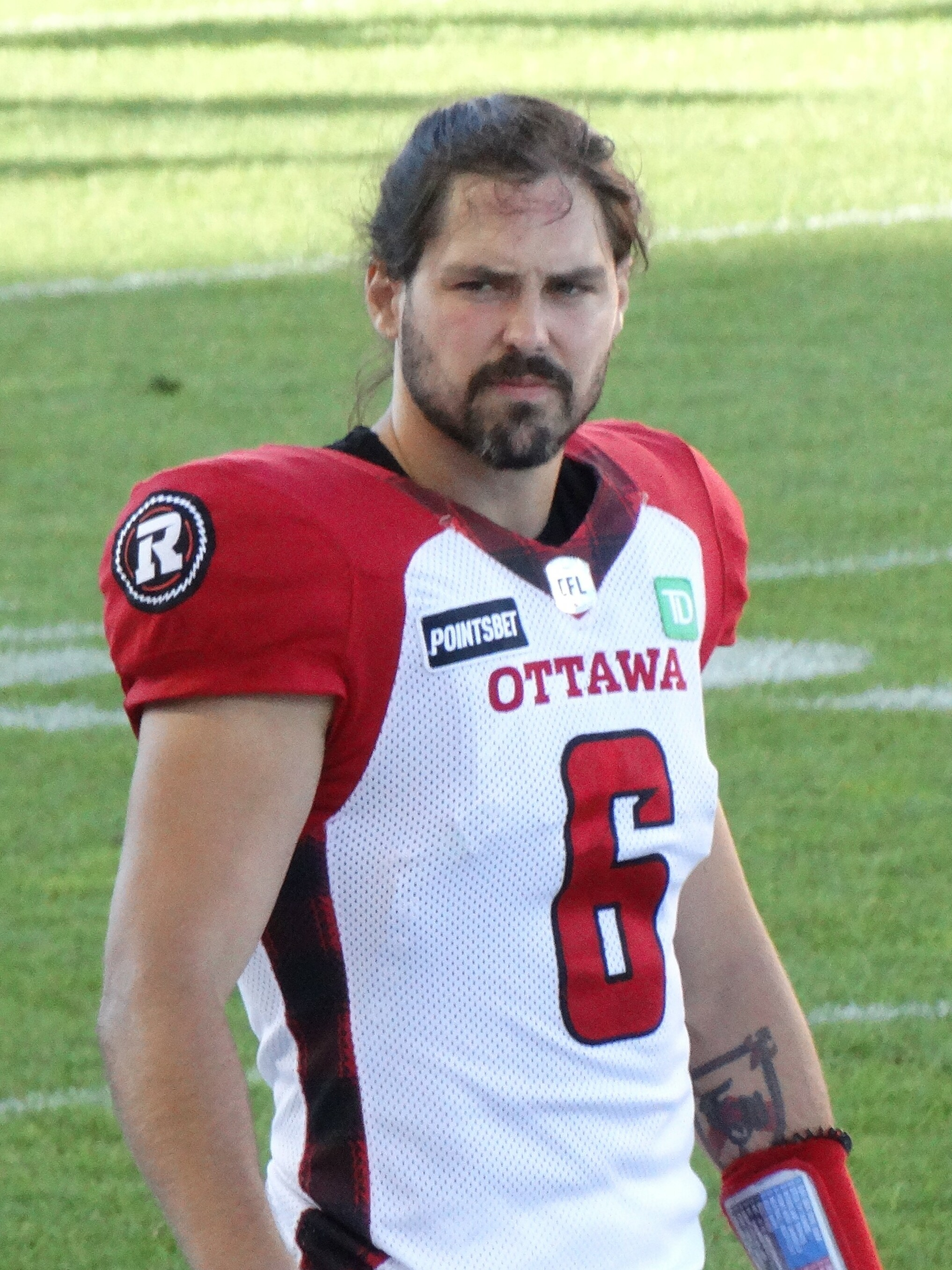
- Pruneau with the Ottawa Redblacks in 2022

Profile
- Position: Defensive back

Personal information
- Born: October 20, 1989 (age 37); Montreal, Quebec, Canada
- Listed height: 6 ft 0 in (1.83 m)
- Listed weight: 200 lb (91 kg)

Career information
- University: Montréal
- CFL draft: 2014: 1st round, 4th overall pick

Career history
- 2014–2022: Ottawa Redblacks

Awards and highlights
- Grey Cup champion – 2016; CFL East All-Star (2017)
- Stats at CFL.ca

Antoine Pruneau (born October 20, 1989) is a Canadian former professional football defensive back who played eight seasons with the Ottawa Redblacks of the Canadian Football League (CFL). Prior to being drafted into the CFL, he played Canadian Interuniversity Sport (CIS) football for the Montreal Carabins.

== University career ==
In university, as a member of the Montreal Carabins, Pruneau was known as a versatile player. He played defensive back before switching to linebacker for his final year, and also served on special teams. During the 2013 season, Pruneau scored two special teams touchdowns; one on a kickoff return and the other on the return of a missed field goal. Pruneau was named to the 2012 and 2013 second All-Canadian Teams by the CIS.

== Professional career ==
The Ottawa Redblacks were impressed by Pruneau's speedand athleticism at the 2014 CFL Combine, and they selected Pruneau in the 1st round of the subsequent draft, 4th overall. In his rookie year, Pruneau saw much playing time on both defense and special teams. He was named the CFL's Canadian player of the month in October. He finished the 2014 season second on the Redblacks with 69 tackles while also contributing 11 special teams tackles and 2 quarterback sacks. Antoine Pruneau was nominated by the RedBlacks as their best rookie. Over the next two seasons Pruneau continued to be an important starter for the Redblacks defence (despite being briefly benched in 2016 due to poor performance). Following the 2016 season Pruneau and the Redblacks agreed on a contract extension, keeping him in Ottawa through the 2019 CFL season. He was named a CFL East All-Star in 2017 after totaling 65 defensive tackles, eight special teams tackles, four interceptions and one quarterback sack. Pruneau played in 13 games for the Redblacks in 2018, contributing with 50 tackles. Immediately following the close of the 2018 season Pruneau agreed to a three-year contract extension. Pruneau suffered a foot injury in Week 13 of the 2019 season - at the time of the injury he had played in eight games for Ottawa that season, contributing with 25 tackles, one interception and one forced fumble.

Following the cancellation of the 2020 season Pruneau returned to the Redblacks for the 2021 season, in which he played in 11 games, finishing the season with 35 defensive tackles, five special teams tackles, and one interception. Pruneau and the Redblacks agreed to a one-year contract extension on February 21, 2022. He played in all 18 regular season games and recorded 18 defensive tackles and 13 special teams tackles in a back up role. On February 9, 2023, Pruneau announced his retirement

He finished his career having played in 122 games with 374 defensive tackles, 74 tackles on special teams, 10 interceptions, four sacks, four forced fumbles, and one defensive touchdown.
