= Connor Williams (Canadian football) =

Canadian football player (born 1991)

No. 99
- Position: Defensive lineman

Personal information
- Born: September 5, 1991 (age 35); North Vancouver, British Columbia, Canada
- Listed height: 6 ft 3 in (1.91 m)
- Listed weight: 278 lb (126 kg)

Career information
- College: Utah State
- CFL draft: 2013: 2nd round, 18th overall pick

Career history
- 2014–2018: Ottawa Redblacks

Awards and highlights
- Grey Cup champion (2016)
- Stats at CFL.ca

Connor Williams (born September 5, 1991) is a Canadian former professional football defensive lineman who played for the Ottawa Redblacks of the Canadian Football League (CFL). He was drafted 18th overall in the 2013 CFL draft by the Ottawa Redblacks and, after completing his college eligibility, signed with the Redblacks on May 28, 2014. He played college football with the Utah State Aggies. He retired from football on July 30, 2018.
