= Jerrell Gavins =

American gridiron football player (born 1988)

No. 4
- Position: Defensive back

Personal information
- Born: October 24, 1988 (age 38); Miami, Florida, U.S.
- Listed height: 5 ft 8 in (1.73 m)
- Listed weight: 178 lb (81 kg)

Career information
- High school: South Miami
- College: Boise State

Career history
- 2013: Tampa Bay Storm
- 2014–2017: Ottawa Redblacks

Awards and highlights
- Grey Cup champion (2016); CFL East All-Star (2015)

Career CFL statistics
- Tackles: 167
- Quarterback sacks: 1
- Interceptions: 7
- Stats at CFL.ca

Jerrell Gavins (born October 24, 1988) is an American former professional Canadian football defensive back for the Ottawa Redblacks of the Canadian Football League (CFL). He played college football at El Camino College and Boise State.

== College career ==
Gavins played for El Camino College in 2008 and joined Boise State as a walk-on in 2009. Gavins had three interceptions in the first three games of the 2011 season, but he suffered a knee injury that forced him to miss the rest of the season. He was granted an injury hardship and returned for a fifth year in 2012. Gavins finished his Boise State career with six interceptions.

== Professional career ==
After going undrafted in the 2013 NFL draft, Gavins received a tryout with the Tampa Bay Buccaneers. On May 30, 2013, Gavins signed with the Tampa Bay Storm.

Gavins signed with the Ottawa Redblacks in November 2013. On July 7, 2014, Gavins was fined $1,400, the CFL's maximum fine, for a hit on Winnipeg Blue Bombers quarterback Drew Willy. Gavins became the first Redblack to be fined for an on-field transgression. He admitted fault for the hit. Gavins played four seasons for the Ottawa Redblacks, winning the Grey Cup in 2016. He played in 59 games for the Redblacks during his CFL career, amassing 167 tackles, seven interceptions, three forced fumbles, and one quarterback sack. Gavins retired from professional football on February 27, 2019 at the age of 30.
