= 104th Grey Cup =

2016 Canadian Football championship game

Calgary Stampeders	Ottawa Redblacks
(15–2–1)	(8–9–1)
33	39
Head coach: Dave Dickenson	Head coach: Rick Campbell
	1	2	3	4	OT	Total
Calgary Stampeders	7	0	10	16	0	33
Ottawa Redblacks	10	10	7	6	6	39
- Date: November 27, 2016
- Stadium: BMO Field
- Location: Toronto
- Most Valuable Player: Henry Burris, QB (Redblacks)
- Most Valuable Canadian: Brad Sinopoli, WR (Redblacks)
- Favourite: Stampeders by 9
- National anthem: The Tenors
- Coin toss: David Johnston
- Referee: André Proulx
- Halftime show: OneRepublic
- Attendance: 33,421

Broadcasters
- Network: Canada (English): TSN; Canada (French): RDS; United States: ESPN2
- Announcers: Chris Cuthbert (play-by-play); Glen Suitor (analyst); Sara Orlesky (sideline reporter); Matthew Scianitti (sideline reporter)
- Ratings: 3.9 million (average); 10 million (total)

The 104th Grey Cup (branded as the 104th Grey Cup presented by Shaw for sponsorship reasons) was a Canadian football game that was played on November 27, 2016, between the Calgary Stampeders and the Ottawa Redblacks, that decided the champion for the 2016 CFL season. In an upset, the Redblacks defeated the heavily favoured Stampeders 39–33 in overtime to win a championship in just their third season of existence. This was the third Grey Cup game to go into overtime (the other two instances came in 1961 and 2005). This also marked a first that a CFL team won its division with a losing record (8–9–1) and became the 3rd worst team (behind the 2000 BC Lions and 2001 Calgary Stampeders who both went 8–10) to win the Grey Cup.

The Redblacks ended a 40-year championship drought for the city of Ottawa that spanned three CFL franchises and 27 football seasons of play. The Redblacks became the fastest Canadian-based expansion team and the fourth-fastest expansion team to win a championship in an established North American professional sports league, after the 1950 Cleveland Browns (who won a championship in their first season in the National Football League), the 1927–28 New York Rangers (who won the Stanley Cup in their second National Hockey League season) and the 1995 Baltimore Stallions (who, as part of the CFL's mid-1990s U.S. expansion, won the Grey Cup in their second and final CFL season); they are tied with the 1970–71 Milwaukee Bucks (winners of the National Basketball Association title in their third season).

The game was played at BMO Field in Toronto, Ontario.

== Background ==
=== Host city ===
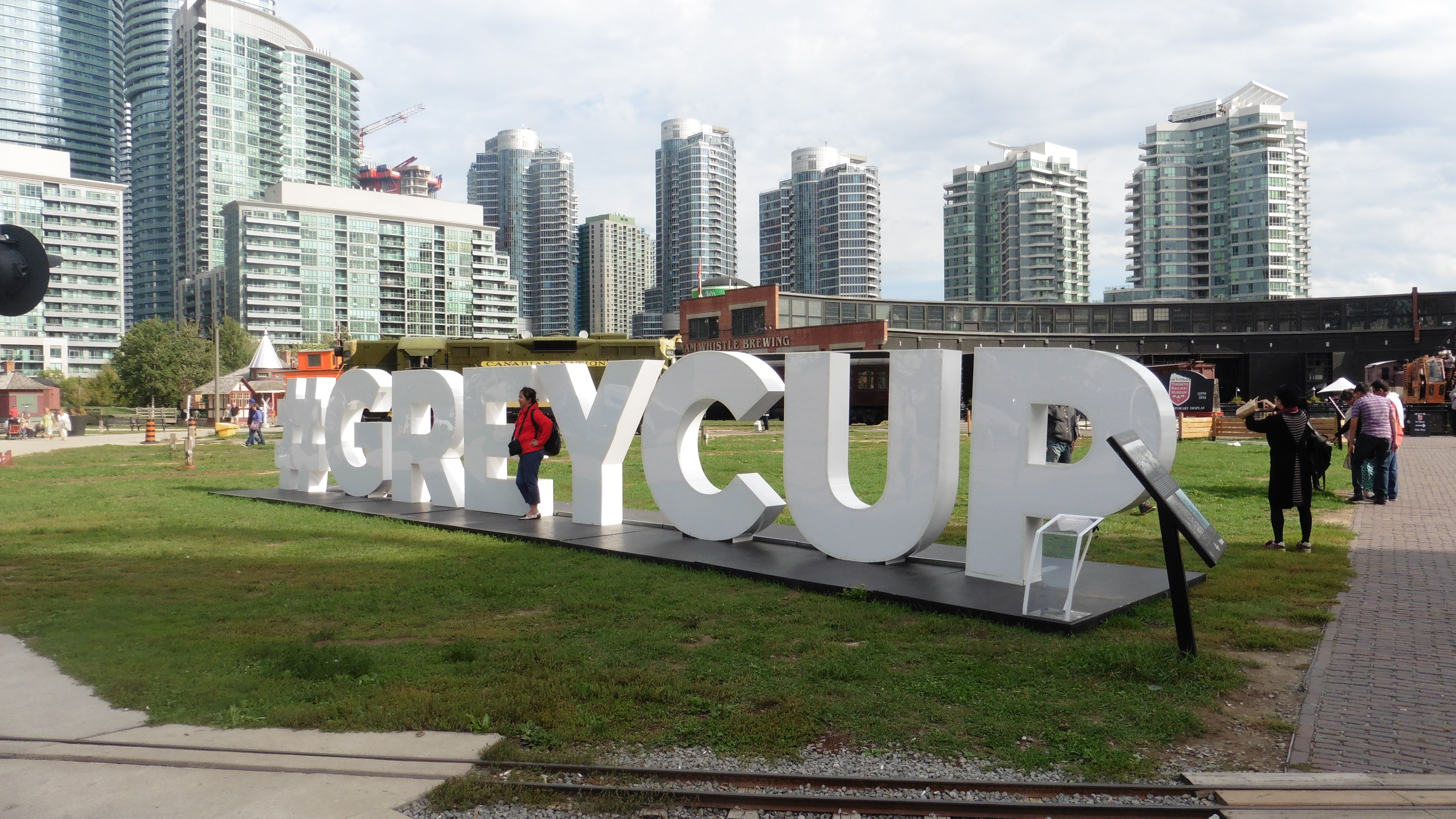
Grey Cup promotion near the John Street Roundhouse at Roundhouse Park in Toronto

On September 4, 2015, news agencies reported that the game would be awarded to Toronto, as a gift to the new Argonaut owners, despite the city recently hosting the 95th and the 100th Grey Cups. On October 1, 2015, this rumor was confirmed at a news conference that BMO Field in Toronto, Ontario, would host the 104th Grey Cup.

It was the 48th Grey Cup game to be held in Toronto, the previous being the 100th Grey Cup in 2012. Although it was the first Grey Cup at BMO Field, which had undergone a $120 million renovation in order to accommodate the CFL franchise, it was not the first to be held at the site – the stadium that previously stood where BMO Field was built (Exhibition Stadium) hosted twelve CFL championship games, the last being the 70th Grey Cup in 1982. It was the first Grey Cup game to be played on a natural grass surface since the 90th Grey Cup at Commonwealth Stadium in Edmonton.

The lead-up to the game was marked by significant media speculation concerning the health of the Argos and of the CFL as a whole in Toronto. The speculation was brought on by several factors, including the poor attendance of Argos games throughout the season, slow ticket sales for the Grey Cup, and a lack of media coverage for the game compared to other sporting events in the city. Despite affirmation of the league's confidence in the Toronto market, the poor showing of fan support in the city led to some questioning the future relevance of the CFL in Canada's largest city. The CFL attributed the slow ticket sales to competition in the Toronto sports market from other major sports teams, including the Toronto Blue Jays and Toronto FC due to their playoff runs.

=== Teams ===
==== Ottawa Redblacks ====
Coming off a season in which they had appeared in the Grey Cup in just their second season of existence, the Redblacks failed to match their 12–6 record of 2015. Nevertheless, they managed to finish in first place in a weak East Division with an 8–9–1 record, becoming the first CFL team to finish first in their division with a losing record. In another CFL first, the Redblacks faced the defending champion Edmonton Eskimos (who, as a crossover team, had defeated the Hamilton Tiger-Cats in the Eastern Semi-Final) in the first Grey Cup rematch to take place in a division final. Despite being underdogs to the 10–8 Eskimos in the Eastern Final, the Redblacks avenged their 2015 Grey Cup loss with a 35–23 win over Edmonton to advance to their second consecutive championship game.

==== Calgary Stampeders ====
After losing the first game of the regular season to the BC Lions, the Stampeders dominated the CFL en route to a 15–2–1 record (tying the team's record for most wins in a season) and a first-place finish. The Stampeders would not lose again until their last game of the regular season (against the Montreal Alouettes) and maintained a fourteen-game win streak between July 21 and October 21, the fourth longest in CFL history. As a result of the team's success five of its players were recognized by the league during its end-of-season awards ceremony, including quarterback Bo Levi Mitchell being named the league's Most Outstanding Player. By virtue of finishing first in the West the Stampeders received a bye through the first round of the playoffs, before defeating the BC Lions 42–15 in the Western Final.

Despite their success on the field, the Stampeders were struck by tragedy on September 25, when defensive back Mylan Hicks was shot and killed at a Calgary nightclub. Fellow defensive back and teammate Jamar Wall changed his jersey number from 29 to Hicks' 31 for the rest of the season in tribute.

==== Head-to-head ====
Ottawa and Calgary met twice in the 2016 regular season. Their first meeting took place on July 8 in Ottawa and resulted in the only tie game of the season, with the two teams playing to a 26–26 draw. In their second and final meeting on September 17, the Stampeders defeated Ottawa 48–23 in Calgary.

== Entertainment ==
The Grey Cup Festival featured various fan events leading up to the game, including activities, the alumni luncheon, and autograph sessions. Two new events added to the festival are the Empowering Women and Community Through Sport Summit, and the first official Grey Cup party in support of the LGBT community, hosted by You Can Play and the law firm Baker & McKenzie at the Striker Sports Bar—Toronto's first sports bar catering to the city's LGBT community. The New Pornographers, Tokyo Police Club, The Lowest of the Low, and The Sheepdogs were announced as headlining acts for the SiriusXM Concert Series.

Canadian opera group The Tenors sang the national anthem marking their first televised performance since their controversial performance at the 2016 Major League Baseball All-Star Game and as a trio, and Canadian singer Alessia Cara headlined the SiriusXM Kickoff Show. On September 7, 2016, the CFL announced that OneRepublic would perform during the Freedom Mobile Halftime Show.

== Venue ==
BMO Field was temporarily expanded to about 34,000 for the Grey Cup game. By the middle of October, ticket prices were lowered due to difficulty in selling tickets to reach the temporary capacity. Originally the tickets were priced between $169 and $899 (before tax), but after the sale the cheapest tickets dropped to $89 and thousands more middle section seats saw a major decrease in cost as well. Some who had purchased their tickets in advance of the mid-October sale were offered upgrades or compensation. Less than a week prior to the game, organizers announced that ticket sales had increased dramatically and they expected a sell-out crowd. Attendance was announced at 33,421.

== Game summary ==
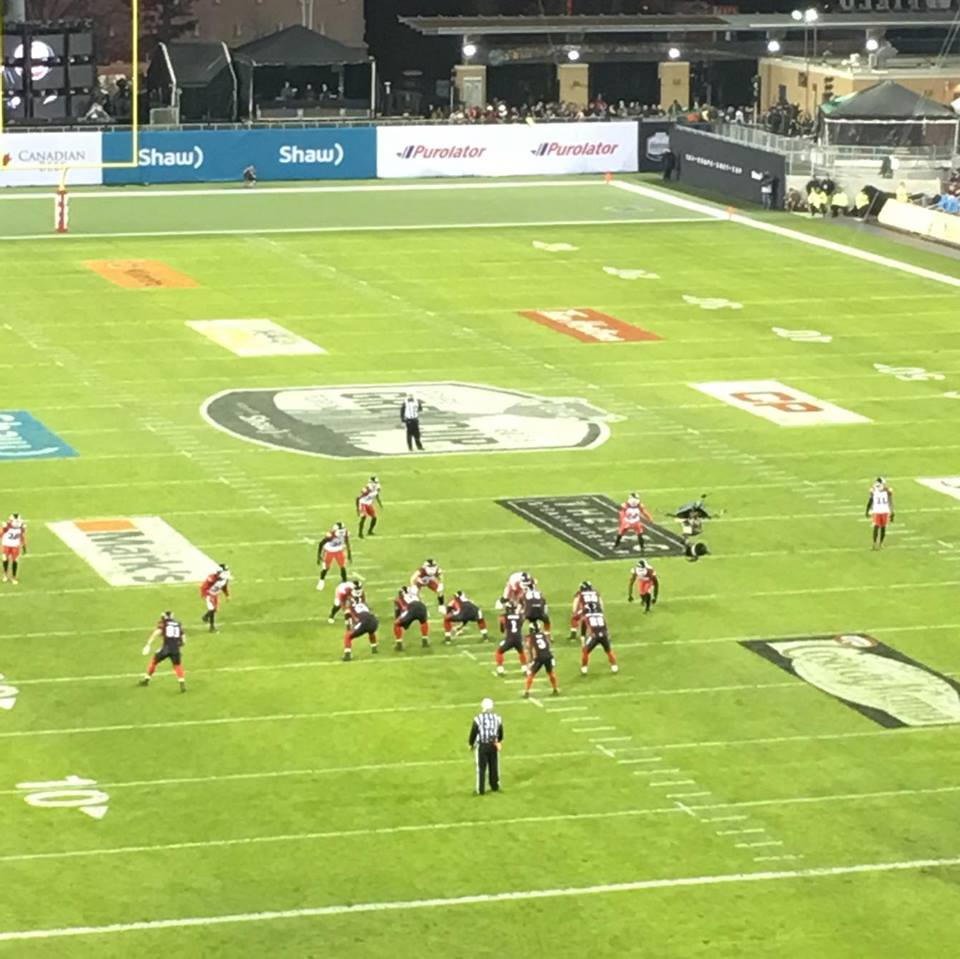
Ottawa Redblacks on offence

First Quarter
OTT – TD Burris 1 yard rush (Early convert) (8:26) 7–0 OTT
CGY – TD Messam 7 yard pass (Paredes convert) (6:08) 7–7 Tie
OTT – FG Early 37 yards (2:13) 10–7 OTT

Second Quarter
OTT – TD Lavoie 6 yard pass (Early convert) (6:46) 17–7 OTT
OTT – FG Early 29 yards (0:08) 20–7 OTT

Third Quarter
OTT – TD Sinopoli 9 yard pass (Early convert) (12:03) 27–7 OTT
CGY – FG Paredes 32 yards (7:33) 27–10 OTT
CGY – TD Durant 33 yard pass (Paredes convert) (4:20) 27–17 OTT

Fourth Quarter
CGY – TD Buckley 1 yard rush (missed convert) (13:53) 27–23 OTT
OTT – TD Burris 1 yard rush (missed convert) (6:21) 33–23 OTT
CGY – TD Daniels 19 yard rush (Paredes convert) (1:44) 33–30 OTT
CGY – FG Paredes 10 yards (0:22) 33–33 Tie

Overtime
OTT – TD Jackson 18 yard pass (missed 2 point convert) (0:00) 39–33 OTT

Immediately prior to the game during the team warm-ups, Ottawa quarterback Henry Burris suffered a scare as he appeared to injure his knee, leading to questions regarding his status for the game. He did not lead his team out onto the field during the team's introduction or participate in the coin toss; in both instances he was replaced by back-up quarterback Trevor Harris. Burris eventually did return to the field in time to start the game, after having received medical attention from the team's doctors.

Calgary entered the game as the heavy favourites, but it was Ottawa that opened the scoring in the game with a touchdown by Burris halfway into the first quarter, capping off a 65-yard opening drive. The Stampeders responded two minutes later with a 79-yard drive of their own which ended with a touchdown pass from Bo Levi Mitchell to the regular season's Most Outstanding Canadian Jerome Messam, tying the game up at 7–7. Redblacks kicker Ray Early would kick a field goal before the end of the first to put the Redblacks ahead 10–7. In the second quarter, the Redblacks continued to score, with Burris connecting with running back Patrick Lavoie for another touchdown with 6:46 remaining and Early scoring another field goal with eight seconds left to put the team up at halftime 20–7. The Redblacks defence intercepted two passes by Mitchell in the second quarter, after Mitchell had thrown only eight in the entire season.

The Redblacks opened the third quarter with another touchdown, this time from Burris to receiver Brad Sinopoli, to make the game 27–7. This was the largest lead of the game for the Redblacks, however, as in a repeat of the 103rd Grey Cup, they found themselves fending off a fierce second-half rally by their opponent. Halfway through the third quarter, Stampeders kicker Rene Paredes connected on a field goal, and on the Stamps' next possession, Mitchell would throw a touchdown pass to wide receiver Lemar Durant to bring the Stampeders within ten points by the start of the fourth quarter. Backup quarterback Andrew Buckley would run for a touchdown a minute into the fourth, making the score 27–23 (Parades missed the subsequent convert kick). The Redblacks would respond eight minutes later with a one-yard touchdown run by Burris (and a missed convert kick by Early) to make the score 33–23 with six minutes to play in the game. With under two minutes left to play in the game, Stampeders wide receiver DaVaris Daniels scored a touchdown to bring the Stampeders within three points. After recovering an onside kick, the Stampeders threatened to end the game with a touchdown and made it to the two-yard line before the Redblacks defence managed to hold them back after a controversial play that saw the Stampeders hand the ball to Buckley – their third-string quarterback – instead of Mitchell or Messam, the CFL's MOP and MOC, respectively. On their final play of regulation, the Stampeders settled for a field goal to tie the game 33–33 and force overtime.

The Stampeders won the coin toss to decide which team would be on offence first, and chose to play second. On the Redblacks' first drive in overtime, Burris threw an 18-yard touchdown pass to Ernest Jackson to go ahead 39–33. After Ottawa failed on the requisite two-point convert attempt, the Stampeders were unable to respond with a touchdown of their own; quarterback Bo Levi Mitchell threw three consecutive incomplete passes to end the game, sealing victory for the Redblacks.

Ottawa quarterback Henry Burris ended the game completing 35–46 passes for 461 yards (the fourth most in Grey Cup history and the first 400+ performance in the game since Danny McManus in 1996), three touchdowns and one interception. Bo Levi Mitchell responded for Calgary with 28–41 passes completed for 391 yards, two touchdowns and three interceptions.

== Aftermath ==
Immediately following the game, Redblacks quarterback Henry Burris was named the Grey Cup's Most Valuable Player, having completed 35-of-46 passes for 461 yards and three touchdowns (while running for another two). Redblacks receiver Brad Sinopoli received the Dick Suderman Trophy as the game's Most Valuable Canadian. Burris became the oldest quarterback to win the Grey Cup at 41 years and 177 days.

The Redblacks' victory ended a 40-year-long championship drought for the city of Ottawa, dating back to the last championship of the Ottawa Rough Riders in 1976. During that timespan, the Rough Riders and the city's original replacement franchise Ottawa Renegades both folded while the modern Ottawa Senators (who have yet to win a Stanley Cup) joined the National Hockey League. Shortly after the game, the City of Ottawa announced it would hold a championship parade and fan rally for the Redblacks on November 29, two days after the game.

On December 7, 2016 CFL Commissioner Jeffrey Orridge fined more than 20 of the 88 players who suited up in this year's Grey Cup because of violations related to how they wore their socks in the game.

== Television ==
The 104th Grey Cup was watched by an average of 3.9 million Canadians, with the average viewership peaking at 5.7 million during the Stampeders' fourth quarter comeback and overtime. The day following the game, the CFL announced the game saw increases in viewership over the previous year, including a 15% increase in viewers from the 18–34 male demographic. This was also the first Grey Cup game broadcast in 4k on TSN's newly created TSN 4k channel. The game also saw significant growth in online viewership and in coverage on social media sites such as Twitter. Overall, approximately ten million Canadians watched at least part of the game.

According to the CFL, approximately 2.5 million viewers in the United States watched the Grey Cup, either on ESPN 2 or through livestreaming.
