= Ottawa Football Clubs all-time records and statistics =

The following is a list of all-time records and statistics competed by Ottawa Football Clubs in the Canadian Football League and the preceding Interprovincial Rugby Football Union. As defined in the 2016 CFL's Facts, Figures, and Records, for historical record purposes and by the current Ottawa Redblacks' request, the Ottawa Football Clubs are considered to be a single entity since 1876 with two periods of inactivity (1997–2001 and 2006–2013). Consequently, this list includes figures from the Ottawa Football Club (1876–1898), Ottawa Rough Riders (1899–1925, 1931–1996), Ottawa Senators (1926–1930), Ottawa Renegades (2002–2005), and Ottawa Redblacks (2014–present).

These figures are current to the 2026 CFL season and are for regular season games only. Each category lists the top five players, where known, except for when the fifth place player is tied in which case all players with the same number are listed.

== Games played ==
Most games played

- 205 – Moe Racine (1958–74)
- 186 – Gerry Organ (1971–77, 79–83)
- 169 – Bob Simpson (1950–62)
- 168 – Joe Poirier (1959–70)
- 167 – Ron Stewart (1958–70)

Most seasons played

- 22 – Eddie Emerson (1912–15, 19–35, 37)
- 16 – Moe Racine (1959–74)
- 13 – Joe Tubman (1919–31)
- 13 – Bob Simpson (1950–62)
- 13 – Ron Stewart (1958–70)

== Scoring ==
Most points – career

- 1,462 – Gerry Organ (1971–77, 79–83)
- 1,063 – Lewis Ward (2018–19, 21–26)
- 841 – Dean Dorsey (1984–87, 89–90)
- 710 – Terry Baker (1990–95)
- 402 – Ron Stewart (1958–70)

Most points – season

- 202 – Terry Baker – 1991
- 198 – Lawrence Tynes – 2003
- 198 – Lewis Ward – 2024
- 184 – Terry Baker – 1992
- 178 – Terry Baker – 1994
- 178 – Christopher Milo – 2016

Most points – game

- 24 – Dave Thelen – versus Toronto Argonauts, September 16, 1959
- 24 – Ron Stewart – at Montreal Alouettes, October 10, 1960
- 24 – Art Green – versus Hamilton Tiger-Cats, September 7, 1975
- 24 – Dean Dorsey – versus Saskatchewan Roughriders, September 24, 1989

Most touchdowns – career

- 70 – Bob Simpson (1950–62)
- 67 – Ron Stewart (1958–70)
- 61 – Tony Gabriel (1975–81)
- 55 – Russ Jackson (1958–69)
- 54 – Whit Tucker (1962–70)

Most touchdowns – season

- 18 – Alvin Walker – 1982
- 16 – Ron Stewart – 1960
- 16 – Caleb Evans – 2022
- 15 – Art Green – 1976
- 14 – Vic Washington – 1969
- 14 – Art Green – 1975
- 14 – Tony Gabriel – 1976

Most touchdowns – game

- 4 – Ken Charlton – versus Hamilton Tigers, November 9, 1946
- 4 – Dave Thelen – versus Toronto Argonauts, September 16, 1959
- 4 – Ron Stewart – at Montreal Alouettes, October 10, 1960
- 4 – Art Green – versus Hamilton Tiger-Cats, September 7, 1975

Most receiving touchdowns – career

- 65 – Bob Simpson (1950–62)
- 61 – Tony Gabriel (1975–81)
- 53 – Whit Tucker (1962–70)
- 34 – Stephen Jones (1990–94)
- 33 – Hugh Oldham (1970–74)

Most receiving touchdowns – season

- 14 – Tony Gabriel – 1976
- 13 – Whit Tucker – 1968
- 13 – Hugh Oldham – 1970
- 12 – David Williams – 1990
- 12 – Greg Ellingson – 2017

Most receiving touchdowns – game

- 3 – Many, most recently Chris Williams – versus Calgary Stampeders, July 8, 2016

Most rushing touchdowns – career

- 54 – Russ Jackson (1958–69)
- 42 – Ron Stewart (1958–70)
- 39 – Dave Thelen (1958–64)
- 32 – Art Green (1973–76, 78)
- 27 – Dustin Crum (2023–25)

Most rushing touchdowns – season

- 16 – Caleb Evans – 2022
- 15 – Ron Stewart – 1960
- 13 – Art Green – 1976
- 13 – Alvin Walker – 1982
- 11 – Art Green – 1975
- 11 – Dustin Crum – 2025

Most rushing touchdowns – game

- 4 – Dave Thelen – versus Toronto Argonauts, September 16, 1959
- 4 – Ron Stewart – versus Montreal Alouettes, October 10, 1960
- 4 – Art Green – versus Hamilton Tiger-Cats, September 7, 1975
- 3 – Many, most recently Dominique Davis – at Calgary Stampeders, June 15, 2019

== Passing ==
Most passing yards – career

- 24,593 – Russ Jackson (1958–69)
- 13,096 – Trevor Harris (2016–18)
- 11,840 – Henry Burris (2014–16)
- 11,251 – Damon Allen (1989–91)
- 10,937 – J. C. Watts (1981–86)

Most passing yards – season

- 5,693 – Henry Burris – 2015
- 5,116 – Trevor Harris – 2018
- 5,063 – Tom Burgess – 1993
- 4,679 – Trevor Harris – 2017
- 4,466 – Kerry Joseph - 2005

Most passing yards – game

- 504 – Henry Burris – versus Montreal Alouettes, October 1, 2015
- 487 – Trevor Harris – versus Montreal Alouettes, August 11, 2018
- 485 – Trevor Harris – versus BC Lions, October 1, 2016
- 480 – Dru Brown – versus Edmonton Elks, July 14, 2024
- 477 – Henry Burris – versus Saskatchewan Roughriders, September 19, 2015

Most pass completions – career

- 1,356 – Russ Jackson (1958–69)
- 1,071 – Trevor Harris (2016–18)
- 976 – Henry Burris (2014–16)
- 803 – Kerry Joseph (2003–05)
- 767 – Damon Allen (1989–91)

Most pass completions – season

- 481 – Henry Burris – 2015
- 431 – Trevor Harris – 2018
- 398 – Trevor Harris – 2017
- 337 – Kerry Joseph – 2005
- 329 – Tom Burgess – 1993

Most pass completions – game

- 45 – Henry Burris – versus Montreal Alouettes, October 1, 2015
- 44 – Trevor Harris – versus Montreal Alouettes, August 11, 2018
- 39 – Trevor Harris – versus Calgary Stampeders, July 8, 2016
- 36 – Trevor Harris – versus Hamilton Tiger-Cats, August 18, 2017
- 35 – Henry Burris – versus Saskatchewan Roughriders, September 19, 2015

Most passing touchdowns – career

- 185 – Russ Jackson (1958–69)
- 75 – Damon Allen (1989–91)
- 68 – Trevor Harris (2016–18)
- 66 – Tom Clements (1975–78)
- 64 – Tom Burgess (1986, 1992–93)

Most passing touchdowns – season

- 34 – Damon Allen – 1990
- 33 – Russ Jackson – 1969
- 30 – Tom Burgess – 1993
- 30 – Trevor Harris – 2017
- 29 – Tom Burgess – 1992

Most passing touchdowns – game

- 6 – Henry Burris – versus Hamilton Tiger-Cats, November 7, 2015
- 5 – Chris Isaac – versus Montreal Concordes, July 29, 1982
- 5 – Damon Allen – versus Edmonton Eskimos, July 26, 1990
- 5 – Tom Burgess – versus Toronto Argonauts, July 9, 1992

== Rushing ==
Most rushing yards – career

- 6,917 – Dave Thelen (1958–64)
- 5,690 – Ron Stewart (1958–70)
- 5,122 – Russ Jackson (1958–69)
- 4,028 – Josh Ranek (2002–05)
- 4,001 – Reggie Barnes (1990–93, 96)

Most rushing yards – season

- 1,486 – Reggie Barnes – 1991
- 1,431 – Alvin Walker – 1983
- 1,407 – Dave Thelen – 1960
- 1,362 – William Powell – 2018
- 1,339 – Dave Thelen – 1959

Most rushing yards – game

- 287 – Ron Stewart – versus Montreal Alouettes, October 10, 1960
- 213 – Tim McCray – versus Edmonton Eskimos, September 21, 1984
- 209 – Dave Thelen – versus Toronto Argonauts, September 14, 1960
- 203 – Alvin Walker – versus Calgary Stampeders, October 23, 1982
- 191 – Reggie Barnes – versus Edmonton Eskimos, August 15, 1991

Most rushing attempts – career

- 1,211 – Dave Thelen (1958–64)
- 983 – Ron Stewart (1958–70)
- 777 – Reggie Barnes (1990–93, 96)
- 745 – Art Green (1973–76, 78)
- 739 – Josh Ranek (2002–05)

Most rushing attempts – season

- 291 – Reggie Barnes – 1991
- 258 – Art Green – 1975
- 251 – William Powell – 2018
- 245 – Dave Thelen – 1960
- 238 – Alvin Walker – 1983

Most rushing attempts – game

- 33 – Dave Thelen – versus Toronto Argonauts, September 14, 1960
- 30 – Tim McCray – versus Edmonton Eskimos, September 21, 1984
- 27 – Alvin Walker – versus Calgary Stampeders, October 23, 1982

Longest rush

- 87 – Bo Scott – versus Montreal Alouettes, August 26, 1965
- 85 – Vic Washington – versus BC Lions, August 13, 1969
- 81 – Tim McCray – versus Edmonton Eskimos, September 21, 1984

== Receiving ==
Most receiving yards – career

- 7,484 – Tony Gabriel (1975–81)
- 6,092 – Whit Tucker (1962–70)
- 6,034 – Bob Simpson (1950–62)
- 5,127 – Brad Sinopoli (2015–19)
- 5,113 – Stephen Jones (1990–94)

Most receiving yards – season

- 1,471 – Gerald Alphin – 1989
- 1,459 – Greg Ellingson – 2017
- 1,402 – Margene Adkins – 1969
- 1,400 – Stephen Jones – 1992
- 1,376 – Brad Sinopoli – 2018

Most receiving yards – game

- 258 – Bob Simpson – versus Toronto Argonauts, September 29, 1956
- 254 – Stephen Jones – versus Toronto Argonauts, July 9, 1992
- 251 – Hugh Oldham – at Toronto Argonauts, August 19, 1971
- 231 – Margene Adkins – versus Toronto Argonauts, October 15, 1969
- 219 – Kelvin Kirk – versus Montreal Concordes, July 29, 1982

Most receptions – career

- 455 – Brad Sinopoli (2015–19)
- 444 – Tony Gabriel (1975–81)
- 394 – Justin Hardy (2022–26)
- 332 – Greg Ellingson (2015–18)
- 279 – Stephen Jones (1990–94)

Most receptions – season

- 116 – Brad Sinopoli – 2018
- 97 – Justin Hardy – 2024
- 96 – Greg Ellingson – 2017
- 94 – Marc Lewis – 1987
- 92 – Ayden Eberhardt – 2026

Most receptions – game

- 13 – Marc Barousse – versus Hamilton Tiger-Cats, July 3, 1986
- 12 – Mossis Madu – versus Toronto Argonauts, September 7, 2019
- 12 – Justin Hardy – versus Calgary Stampeders, September 19, 2026
- 11 – Tony Gabriel – versus Montreal Alouettes, August 16, 1976
- 11 – Robert Gordon – versus BC Lions, November 2, 1996
- 11 – Josh Ranek – versus Winnipeg Blue Bombers August 19, 2005
- 11 – Brad Sinopoli – versus Montreal Alouettes, July 6, 2018
- 11 – Brad Sinopoli – versus BC Lions, July 20, 2018
- 11 – Greg Ellingson – versus Montreal Alouettes, August 11, 2018
- 11 – Dominique Rhymes – versus Saskatchewan Roughriders, June 20, 2019
- 11 – Justin Hardy – versus Montreal Alouettes, October 10, 2022
- 11 – Justin Hardy – versus BC Lions, August 24, 2024
- 11 – Bralon Addison – versus BC Lions, September 12, 2025
- 11 – Ayden Eberhardt – versus Edmonton Elks, July 9, 2026

== Interceptions ==
Most interceptions – career

- 47 – Joe Poirier (1959–70)
- 37 – Al Marcelin (1970–75)
- 31 – Rod Woodward (1971–76)
- 28 – Wayne Tosh (1971–78)
- 28 – George Brancato (1957–62)

Most interceptions – season

- 11 – Less Browne – 1992
- 10 – Don Sutherin – 1969
- 10 – Mike Nelms – 1979
- 10 – Troy Wilson – 1988
- 10 – Korey Banks – 2005

Most interceptions – game

- 4 – Chris Sigler – versus Montreal Alouettes, June 27, 1986

Most interception return yards – career

- 658 – Joe Poirier (1959–70)
- 543 – Rod Woodward (1971–76)
- 525 – Al Marcelin (1970–75)

Most interception return yards – season

- 259 – Less Browne – 1992
- 236 – Barry Ardern – 1969

Most interception return yards – game

- 172 – Barry Ardern – versus Hamilton Tiger-Cats, November 1, 1969

== Tackles ==
- Note: Tackles were first recorded in 1987, but there was no differentiation between defensive and special teams tackles. Those categorical differences were added in 1991.

Most defensive tackles – career

- 378 – Antoine Pruneau (2014–19, 2021–22)
- 292 – Avery Williams (2018–19, 2021–22)
- 242 – Abdul Kanneh (2014–16, 2021–23)
- 241 – Kelly Wiltshire (2002–04)
- 240 – John Kropke (1989–95)

Most total tackles – season

- 127 – Bruce Holmes – 1990
- 98 – Adarius Pickett – 2025
- 95 – Kyries Hebert – 2005
- 94 – Taylor Reed – 2017
- 94 – Avery Williams – 2022

Most defensive tackles – season

- 127 – Bruce Holmes – 1990
- 94 – Taylor Reed – 2017
- 92 – Avery Williams – 2022
- 89 – Avery Williams – 2021
- 89 – Nyles Morgan – 2026

Most defensive tackles – game

- 14 – Bruce Holmes – versus Edmonton Eskimos, October 15, 1989
- 14 – Avery Williams – versus Edmonton Elks, August 7, 2021

Most special teams tackles – career

- 113 – Nigel Romick (2014–19, 2021–25)
- 74 – Antoine Pruneau (2014–19, 2021–22)
- 60 – Kyries Hebert (2004–05, 2018)
- 55 – Andrew Marshall (2014–18)
- 55 – Kene Onyeka (2019–25)

Most special teams tackles – season

- 30 – Dean Noel – 1994
- 29 – Kyries Hebert – 2005
- 29 – Keelan Johnson – 2017
- 27 – Daniel Hunter – 1991
- 27 – Kyries Hebert – 2004

Most special teams tackles – game

- 7 – Darren Joseph – versus Toronto Argonauts, October 13, 2003
- 6 – Daniel Hunter – versus Calgary Stampeders, July 24, 1991

== Quarterback sacks (since 1981) ==
Most sacks – career

- 71 – Greg Marshall (1981–87)
- 57 – Loyd Lewis (1985–91, 95–96)
- 41 – Gregg Stumon (1990–93)
- 39 – Angelo Snipes (1991–93)
- 37 – Lorenzo Mauldin (2022–25)

Most sacks – season

- 20 – Angelo Snipes – 1992
- 17 – Lorenzo Mauldin – 2022
- 16.5 – Greg Marshall – 1984
- 15.5 – Greg Marshall – 1983
- 15 – Loyd Lewis – 1986

Most sacks – game

- 5 – Anthony Collier – versus BC Lions, July 8, 2005

== Punt returns ==
Most punt return yards – career

- 1,985 – DeVonte Dedmon (2019, 2021–25)
- 1,893 – Don Pinhey (1954–58)
- 1,778 – Diontae Spencer (2017–18)
- 1,645 – Mike Nelms (1977–79)
- 1,616 – Kalil Pimpleton (2024–26)

Most punt return yards – season

- 1,155 – Mike Nelms – 1979
- 936 – Treamelle Taylor – 1992

Most punt return yards – game

- 208 – Moody Jackson – at Toronto Argonauts, August 11, 1976
- 203 – Daric Zeno – versus Edmonton Eskimos, July 18, 1985

Longest punt return – game

- 108 – Ernie White – at Montreal Alouettes, August 16, 1960
- 101 – Mariet Ford – versus Winnipeg Blue Bombers, October 16, 1983
- 99 – Kalil Pimpleton – versus Calgary Stampeders, July 26, 2024
- 97 – Mark Ricks – versus Birmingham Barracudas, September 17, 1995
- 97 – Kalil Pimpleton – at Edmonton Elks, July 6, 2025

== Kickoff returns ==
Most kickoff return yards – career

- 3,347 – DeVonte Dedmon (2019, 2021–25)
- 2,806 – Kalil Pimpleton (2024–26)
- 2,616 – Al Marcelin (1970–75)
- 1,962 – Ron Stewart (1958–70)
- 1,782 – Jason Armstead (2004–05)

Most kickoff return yards – season

- 1,834 – Kalil Pimpleton – 2026
- 1,307 – Stacey Dawsey – 1990
- 1,223 – DeVonte Dedmon – 2021
- 1,167 – Kenny Wilhite – 1996

Most kickoff return yards – game

- 243 – Kalil Pimpleton – at Montreal Alouettes, June 28, 2026
- 211 – DeVonte Dedmon – versus Montreal Alouettes, September 3, 2021
- 192 – Stacey Dawsey – at Calgary Stampeders, August 22, 1990

Longest kickoff return – game

- 111 – DeVonte Dedmon – at Montreal Alouettes, August 2, 2019
- 107 – Vic Washington – versus Calgary Stampeders, August 6, 1969
- 104 – Vic Washington – versus Hamilton Tiger-Cats, August 1, 1968
- 101 – DeVonte Dedmon – versus Montreal Alouettes, June 20, 2024
- 100 – DeVonte Dedmon – versus Toronto Argonauts, November 6, 2021

== Field goals ==
Most field goals – career

- 318 – Gerry Organ (1971–77, 79–83)
- 302 – Lewis Ward (2018–19, 2021–26)
- 196 – Dean Dorsey (1984–87, 89–90)
- 159 – Terry Baker (1990–95)
- 78 – Christopher Milo (2015–16)

Most field goals – season

- 58 – Lewis Ward – 2024
- 51 – Lawrence Tynes – 2003
- 51 – Lewis Ward – 2018
- 49 – Lewis Ward – 2022
- 47 – Christopher Milo – 2016

Most field goals – game

- 7 – Dean Dorsey – versus Saskatchewan Roughriders, September 24, 1989
- 7 – Terry Baker – versus Edmonton Eskimos, July 20, 1994
- 7 – Lewis Ward – versus Hamilton Tiger-Cats, July 28, 2018
- 7 – Lewis Ward – versus Edmonton Eskimos, September 22, 2018

Highest field goal accuracy – career (minimum 75 attempts)

- 86.53% (302/349) – Lewis Ward (2018–19, 2021–26)
- 84.78% (78/92) – Christopher Milo (2015–16)
- 81.61% (71/87) – Lawrence Tynes (2002–03)
- 75.97% (196/258) – Dean Dorsey (1984–87, 89–90)
- 75.86% (66/87) – Brett Maher (2014–15, 17)

Highest field goal accuracy – season (minimum 30 attempts)

- 98.08% (51/52) – Lewis Ward – 2018
- 94.12% (32/34) – Brett Lauther – 2026
- 91.18% (31/34) – Christopher Milo – 2015
- 87.88% (58/66) – Lewis Ward – 2024
- 86.00% (43/50) – Lewis Ward – 2019

Longest field goal

- 56 – Lewis Ward – versus Hamilton Tiger-Cats, October 19, 2019
- 56 – Brett Lauther – versus Calgary Stampeders, September 26, 2026
- 55 – Dean Dorsey – versus Saskatchewan Roughriders, July 7, 1985
- 55 – Wayne Lammie – versus Calgary Stampeders, September 27, 1996
- 55 – Christopher Milo – versus Edmonton Eskimos, June 25, 2016
- 55 – Christopher Milo – versus Toronto Argonauts, July 31, 2016

Most consecutive field goals

- 69 – Lewis Ward (June 28, 2018 – August 9, 2019)
- 23 – Dean Dorsey (November 1, 1986 – August 9, 1987)
- 23 – Brett Lauther (June 6, 2026 – August 14, 2026)
