= Brad Sinopoli =

Canadian football wide receiver

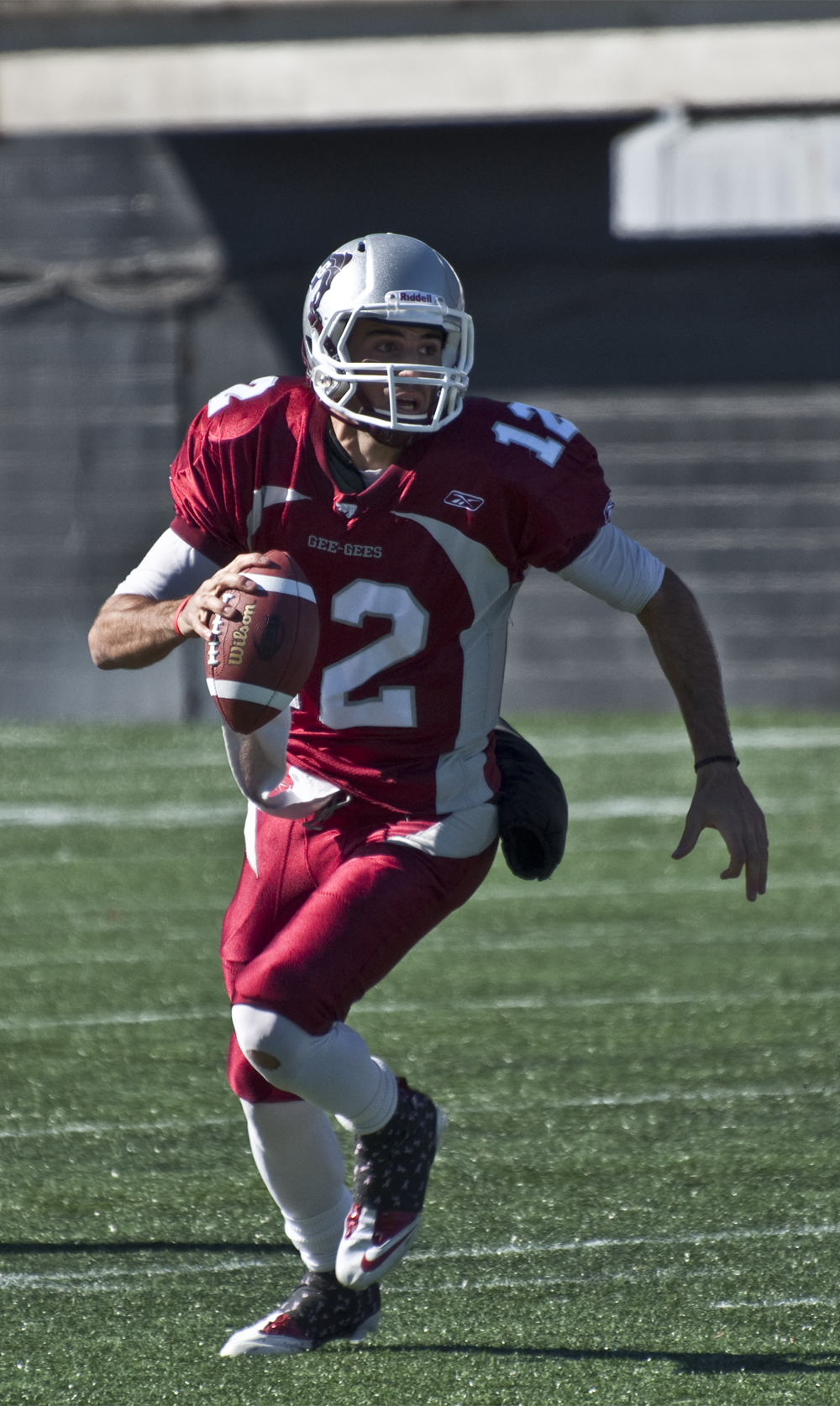
- Sinopoli with the University of Ottawa in 2010

No. 12, 88
- Positions: Wide receiver, quarterback

Personal information
- Born: April 14, 1988 (age 38); Peterborough, Ontario, Canada
- Listed height: 6 ft 4 in (1.93 m)
- Listed weight: 215 lb (98 kg)

Career information
- High school: Crestwood
- University: Ottawa
- CFL draft: 2011: 4th round, 29th overall pick

Career history
- 2011–2014: Calgary Stampeders
- 2015–2020: Ottawa Redblacks

Awards and highlights
- 2× Grey Cup champion (2014, 2016); 2× CFL's Most Outstanding Canadian Award (2015, 2018); CFL All-Star (2018); 3× CFL East All-Star (2015, 2017, 2018); 3× Lew Hayman Trophy (2015, 2017, 2018); Dick Suderman Trophy (2016); Hec Crighton Trophy (2010)
- Stats at CFL.ca

Bradley Sinopoli (born April 14, 1988) is a Canadian former professional football wide receiver who played nine years in the Canadian Football League (CFL). He was originally a quarterback with the Calgary Stampeders before being converted to wide receiver in 2013. He then joined the Ottawa Redblacks where he was twice named the CFL's Most Outstanding Canadian, was named an East Division All-Star three times, and a CFL All-Star in 2018. He won two Grey Cup championships, after winning with the Stampeders in 2014 and with the Redblacks in 2016, the latter of which he was also named the game's Most Valuable Canadian.

Sinopoli played CIS football for the Ottawa Gee-Gees from 2007 to 2010. In 2010, Sinopoli became the fourth Gee-Gee player to win the Hec Crighton Trophy after passing for a school record and CIS leading 2,756 passing yards and 22 touchdowns in eight games. Because of his strong season, he was one of only two quarterbacks invited to the CFL Evaluation Camp for players eligible in the 2011 CFL draft.

== Early life ==
Sinopoli played high school football at Crestwood Secondary School for the Mustangs in his hometown of Peterborough, Ontario. He was also a former AAA hockey player for the Peterborough Minor Petes of the OMHA's Eastern AAA League.

== University career ==
=== Regular season statistics ===
Year	Team	Comp	Att	Pct	Yards	TD	Int	Rating
2007	Ottawa Gee-Gees	16	30	53.3	243	1	1	77.5
2008	Ottawa Gee-Gees	22	40	55.0	355	4	1	107.8
2009	Ottawa Gee-Gees	176	303	58.1	2426	12	7	87.4
2010	Ottawa Gee-Gees	184	301	61.1	2756	22	13	97.5

=== Playoff statistics ===
Year	Team	Comp	Att	Pct	Yards	TD	Int	Rating
2009	Ottawa Gee-Gees	30	54	55.6	342	1	1	73.2
2010	Ottawa Gee-Gees	40	71	56.3	656	4	2	94.6

== Professional career ==
=== Calgary Stampeders ===
Sinopoli was drafted 29th overall in the fourth round of the 2011 CFL draft by the Calgary Stampeders. He was later signed to a contract with the Stampeders on May 20, 2011. He dressed in all 18 regular season games for the 2011 season as the third-string quarterback as well as dressing in the West Semi-Final. Sinopoli served as the team's holder for placekicks in all of their games as well. Prior to the start of the 2012 regular season, Sinopoli was released by the Stampeders. Following an injury to Calgary's starting quarterback Drew Tate, Sinopoli was re-signed by the Stampeders on July 9, 2012. Thereafter, Sinopoli dressed for ten games as the third-string quarterback before Tate went back on the active roster. Following another injury to Tate, Sinopoli dressed in the West Final and 100th Grey Cup. Due to the entrenched quarterbacks on the depth chart, Sinopoli was moved to wide receiver for the 2013 CFL season, with his first career reception coming against the Montreal Alouettes. Sinopoli recorded his first CFL touchdown on a 26-yard run in a 10–7 victory over the Hamilton Tiger-Cats on July 18, 2014. He finished the 2013 season with 34 receptions and 417 receiving yards in 14 regular season games played. In 2014, he recorded his first receiving touchdown in a game against the Toronto Argonauts on September 13, 2014. He broke his collarbone while catching a touchdown pass on October 17, 2014 and sat out the rest of the season. While he didn't play in the game, Sinopoli earned his first Grey Cup championship following the Stampeders' victory in the 102nd Grey Cup game.

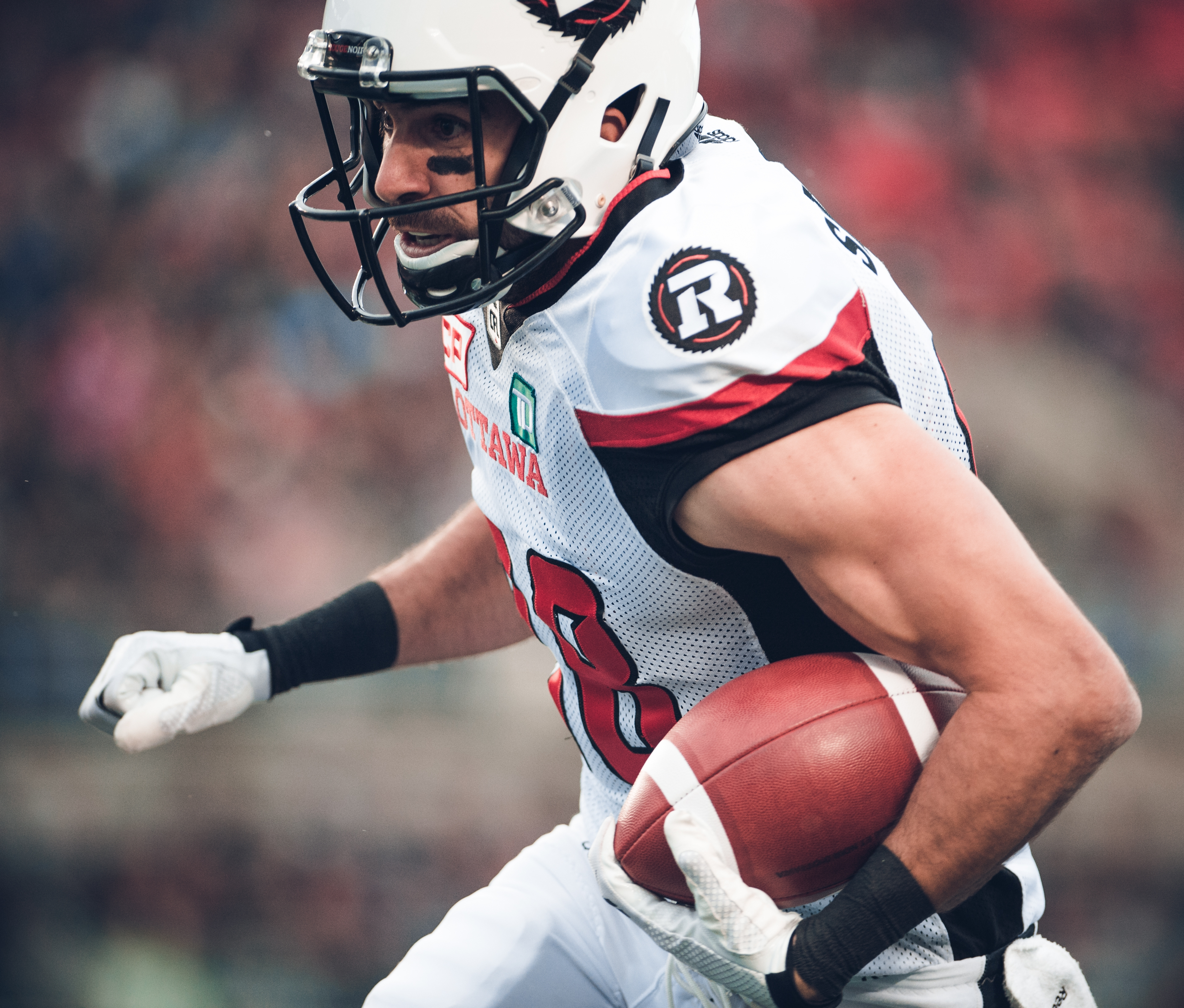
Sinopoli with the Ottawa Redblacks in 2016

=== Ottawa Redblacks ===
On February 10, 2015, Sinopoli signed a free agent contract with the Ottawa Redblacks. He had a break-out season with the Ottawa Redblacks; playing in all 18 regular season games and becoming one of four Ottawa receivers with 1,000-yard receiving seasons. Sinopoli finished the regular season with 86 receptions, for 1,035 yards with three touchdowns. His successful season was rewarded when he was named the CFL's Most Outstanding Canadian. In 2016, Sinopoli surpassed his 2015 performance by finishing the regular season with 90 receptions, for 1,036 with four touchdowns (all career highs). He would also go on to win the Dick Suderman Trophy as the Most Valuable Canadian player at the 104th Grey Cup after compiling six receptions for 94 yards and one touchdown in the Redblacks' upset victory over the Calgary Stampeders. In the Redblacks' second to last regular season game of the 2017 season, Sinopoli injured his shoulder. Following the team's bye week it was announced that he would miss the remainder of the season with a broken bone in his shoulder that would require surgery. At the time of his injury, Sinopoli was seventh in the league in receiving yards with 1,009. Immediately following the 2017 season, Sinopoli signed a new two-year extension. He played in 17 games in 2018, resting for the last game of the regular season, but still managed to post a career-high 116 receptions for 1,376 receiving yards and four touchdowns. He set an all-time CFL record for receptions in a season by a Canadian player (previously 112 by Ben Cahoon in 2003) as well as setting the all-time Ottawa professional football record for most receptions in a season (previously 96 by Greg Ellingson in 2017). 2019 was a down year for Sinopoli, and the Redblacks as a whole. After the team blocked offensive coordinator Jaime Elizondo the opportunity to interview for a head coaching vacancy in Saskatchewan, Elizondo left to join Marc Trestman in the XFL, creating a hole in the coaching staff, and resulting in an inconsistent "offensive committee" to call plays from either Winston October or Joe Paopao. Also in free agency, Ottawa General Manager Marcel Desjardins did not extend key components of Ottawa's offense from the past several seasons, including all star players William Powell, SirVincent Rogers, and Greg Ellingson, as well as starting quarterback Trevor Harris, getting into contract disputes with the latter two. With Sinopoli as the only remaining star player on offense, the team struggled and finished dead last with a record of 3–15. Sinopoli's statistics suffered from playing with three different quarterbacks, and the lack of a running game; no Ottawa running back scored a touchdown all season. Sinopoli managed 72 catches for 671 yards and 3 touchdowns. Following a cancelled 2020 season, Sinopoli and the Redblacks agreed to a restructured contract enabling him to remain with the team for the 2021 season. However, shortly before the 2021 season began, Sinopoli announced his retirement on June 23, 2021.

== CFL career statistics ==
Receiving		Regular season						Playoffs
Year	Team	GA	Rec	Yards	Avg	Long	TD	GA	Rec	Yards	Avg	Long	TD
2011	CGY	18	0	0	0.0	0	0	1	0	0	0.0	0	0
2012	CGY	10	0	0	0.0	0	0	2	0	0	0.0	0	0
2013	CGY	14	34	417	12.3	42	0	1	1	28	28	28	0
2014	CGY	7	15	133	8.9	27	2	Injured
2015	OTT	18	86	1035	12.0	41	3	3	6	53	8.8	16	1
2016	OTT	17	90	1036	11.5	65	4	2	8	109	13.6	31	1
2017	OTT	17	91	1009	11.1	34	3	Injured
2018	OTT	17	116	1376	11.9	38	4	2	6	85	14.2	25	0
2019	OTT	17	72	671	9.3	26	3	did not qualify
CFL totals		139	509	5741	11.3	65	19	11	21	275	13.1	31	2

== Awards and honours ==
In 2016, the Ontario Sports Hall of Fame recognized Brad Sinopoli as the 2015 Syl Apps Athlete of the Year Award recipient. The award celebrates the contributions of top athletes in Ontario, and is awarded to the athlete who has made an outstanding and memorable contribution to Ontario sports during the previous calendar year. The online public vote to determine the award recipient concluded on March 31, 2016 with Sinopoli edging out other top professional competitors such as Andre De Grasse, Brooke Henderson and Andrew Wiggins to win. He received nearly 30% of total votes cast.
