= Archbishop Curley High School =

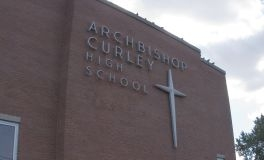

Location
- 3701 Sinclair Lane; Baltimore, Maryland 21213-2079; United States; 39°18′47″N 76°33′54″W

Information
- Type: Private, boys
- Motto: Quis ut Deus (Who is like unto God?)
- Religious affiliation: Roman Catholic
- Patron saint: St. Francis of Assisi
- Established: 1961; 65 years ago
- School district: Archdiocese of Baltimore
- Oversight: Order of Friars Minor Conventual
- Superintendent: Sr. Patricia McCarron, SSND, Ph.D.
- CEEB code: 210032
- President: Mr. Jeremy Joseph ‘96
- Principal: Mr. Ken Pipkin
- Grades: 9–12
- Enrollment: 500
- Average class size: 26
- Student to teacher ratio: 13:1
- Campus size: 33 acres (130,000 m^{2})
- Campus type: Urban
- Colors: Black & white
- Athletics: MIAA
- Athletics conference: B
- Mascot: The Friar
- Team name: Friars
- Accreditation: Middle States Association of Colleges and Schools
- Website: www.archbishopcurley.org

Archbishop Curley High School is a Roman Catholic boys' high school in the Roman Catholic Archdiocese of Baltimore in the United States, within the City of Baltimore. It is affiliated with the Conventual Franciscan religious order. It is the brother school to the neighboring girls' school, The Catholic High School of Baltimore.

== Early history ==
The school is named for Michael Joseph Curley, the tenth archbishop of Baltimore and the first archbishop of Washington. It opened in September 1961 with a class of 420 freshmen, and was dedicated on 17 April 1962, by Cardinal Lawrence Shehan.

The building was designed by the local architect Edward H. Glidden and is located on a 33-acre (130,000 m^{2}) campus on the northeast edge of the City of Baltimore.

The first head of school was Fr. Aloysius Balcerak, OFM Conv.. The school's first graduating class matriculated in 1965.

== Growth and development ==
Archbishop Curley High School celebrated its 25th anniversary during the 1985–1986 school year under principal Fr. Gregory Hartmayer (later Archbishop of Atlanta). During that year, a smaller wing was added onto the building to house the instrumental music department facilities, including a concert practice room. Additional athletic facilities were added in an adjacent wing, including the weight room and wrestling room.

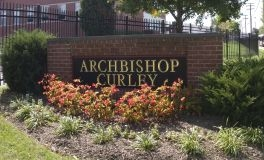
Capital Campaign efforts have improved the campus of the school

In 1994, the school appointed the first head of school to also be an alumnus. Fr. Donald Grzymski, OFM Conv. graduated from Curley in 1970. Fr. Grzymski's tenure as principal is most notable for transitioning the school to a president-principal model, where he continued as head of school in the role of the Curley's first president. Under his leadership, the school undertook its first capital campaign, !Endowing Our Tradition!, with the funds benefiting Curley's endowment. By 1996, Fr. Michael Martin, OFM Conv. '79 had joined Grzymski in the administration as the school's principal.

By 2000, a shift had begun to take place among the faculty and staff. Three notable educators who had served since 1962 all retired after over 30 years each. As E. Patrick Maloney, Richard "Coach" Patry, and Albert E. Frank left the school, a new trend was beginning to emerge. Alumni were increasingly returning to teach and work at their alma mater. By the start of the 21st century, the school had over a dozen such, both in leadership offices and in the classroom.

== 21st century expansion ==
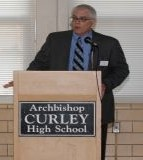
Barry Brownlee, Curley's first lay principal

At the start of the 21st century, with the endowment secured, the campus grounds were revamped with new fencing, a concession stand and a new bowl stadium with terraced seating. After the completion of the Bowl project, Fr. Grzymski stepped down as president and Fr. Martin was appointed to succeed him. Fr. Martin in turn was replaced as principal by Mr. Barry Brownlee, who had previously been an assistant under Fr. Martin, and was the first lay principal in the school.

At the end of the 2004–2005 school year, the first phase of a major facilities renaissance was begun. The friary was reconstructed to better reflect the number of religious living on the grounds and the balance of the space provided room for the relocation of the Lawrence Cardinal Shehan Library to the second floor, adjacent to the academic wing of the building. The space previously occupied by the library was renovated to house a new fitness center, with expanded weight training and wrestling room space. An office for the full-time athletic trainer was also added.

A grant provided funds for a rehabilitation of the auditorium seating and, in summer 2005, further renovations funded by a capital campaign provided a new faculty dining room, a relocated bookstore, conference rooms and offices for the development director, athletic director and alumni association. The science laboratories, school roof, tennis courts and student lockers were also rehabilitated.

=== Capital campaign improvements ===
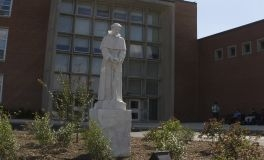
The new entrance to the school.

Under the theme "In Giving We Receive" an aggressive capital campaign was launched in 2008 to generate funds for improvements to the campus in advance of the school's 50th anniversary in 2011.

In summer 2008, a second parking lot was added and the interior roads were renovated, reestablishing the Auditorium lobby as the main entrance of the school. An elevator, making the academic wing ADA accessible, was completed in the spring of 2009. The auditorium was also temperature-controlled for air-conditioning and heat. Additional renovations have included the gymnasium, main office, auditorium lobby and the guidance office.

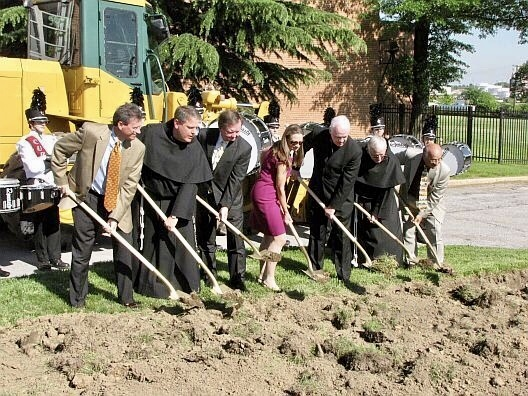
Groundbreaking on the Holthaus Center for the Arts

In May 2009, ground was broken on a $4 million complex, the Holthaus Center for the Fine Arts. The center is named for Gerard E. Holthaus '67, then-CEO of Algeco Scotsman International, who made a $1 million leadership gift to the building campaign. The new facility, completed in May 2010, houses choral and instrumental music practice rooms, as well as storage for Blackfriars' Theatre and space for the Visual Arts Department. Offices for student media and student activities round out the state-of-the-art complex.

Curley celebrated its fiftieth anniversary during the 2010–2011 school year in honor of its founding in 1960 and its opening in 1961. The theme was "A Year of Jubilee".

A capital campaign was begun in 2018 with the theme "Renewing Our Future." The purpose of this campaign is to air-condition the gymnasium, locker rooms and the academic building classrooms.

=== Leadership transitions ===
After nine years as president, Fr. Martin announced in November 2009 that he was stepping down at the conclusion of the 2009–2010 school year. His successor, nominated by the school board and the friars and confirmed by Archbishop Edwin O'Brien, was Fr. Joseph Benicewicz '78, OFM Conv.

After assisting Fr. Benicewicz with the transition to the president's office, Mr. Brownlee announced his retirement as principal. His successor was named as Mr. Philip Piercy. Concurrent to this announcement, Mr. Joseph DellaMonica, vice-president of finance and Curley's longest-tenured employee (43 years), also announced his retirement. With additional changes in both assistant principal offices and campus ministry, 2011–2012 had the largest leadership transition in the school's history.

In July 2014, the archdiocese announced that Fr. Benicewicz and Mr. Piercy would not continue in their roles for the 2014–15 academic year. Fr. Donald Grzymski OFM Conv. agreed to serve again as president. Assistant Principal, Mr. Brian Kohler, was promoted to Principal.

In spring 2021, principal Brian Kohler announced that he would be accepting a position as President of Archbishop Spalding High School. At this time, a national search for a new principal began. After an extensive search, executive director of enrollment & marketing Mr. Jeremy Joseph (‘96) was named as the next principal of Archbishop Curley High School.

In September 2025, Fr. Donald Grzymski, OFM Conv. announced his retirement at the conclusion of the 2025-2026 academic year, concluding his second term as the school’s President. Without a Friar to replace him, the school launched the search for the first lay President in the school’s history. In February 2026, the Board of Trustees announced that they had unanimously voted for Mr. Jeremy Joseph, principal, to assume the role of President. Joseph assumed this role in July 2026. Soon after, the Archdiocese of Baltimore confirmed the appointment of Mr. Kenneth Pipkin, assistant principal, as the school’s next Principal. Joseph and Pipkin have held their respective roles since July 2026.

== Academics ==
There are three distinct academic pathways available at school. Mobility and flexibility between pathways is a key value of the curricula.

=== The Honors Pathway ===
The Honors Pathway offers a rigorous course of study for intellectually gifted students. St. Bonaventure Scholars is a stand-alone program within the Honors Pathway. These students achieve baccalaureate honors through a Capstone project as well as numerous Advanced Placement courses and electives.

=== The College Prep Pathway ===
The college-preparatory curriculum offers development in 21st century skills for students performing at or near grade-level ability. Emphasis is placed on an inquiry-based system of study that engages students across disciplines.

=== The Anthony Pathway ===
This adaptive learning curriculum offers support and remediation to student with diagnosed learning differences. Resources are provided to assist students of all ability levels achieve their fullest potential.

== Campus life ==
=== Campus activities ===
The school has over 30 clubs and co-curricular activities for students to participate in beyond the classroom. Intramural sports provide students an opportunity for informal recreation and competitive play throughout the school year. A comprehensive summer program for both recreation and academic enrichment is also offered annually.

=== Campus ministry ===
Curley's Franciscan Youth Ministry program offers students opportunities for prayer, liturgy and fellowship, as well as a commitment to service, social justice and community outreach.

=== Sport ===
Archbishop Curley High School was a founding member of the Maryland Interscholastic Athletic Association (MIAA). After the disbanding of the Maryland Scholastic Association (MSA) in 1994, it was Fr. Robert Twele, then Curley's principal, who led the committee to draft the new organization's constitution and its by-laws. Consequently, championships from 1961 to 1994 are from the MSA and championships since 1995 are from the MIAA.

Sport	Season	Varsity conference	JV conference	Frosh conference	Varsity championships
Soccer	Fall	A	A	A	1968, 1979, 1994, 1995, 1999, 2006
Football	Fall	B	B	-	2000, 2001, 2003, 2004, 2014, 2024
Cross country	Fall	A	A	-	1975, 1981, 1982, 1984, 1987, 1990, 2002
Volleyball	Fall	A	A	-
Wrestling	Winter	A	A	-	1981, 1998, 1999, 2001, 2002
Basketball	Winter	B	B	B	1996, 2001, 2020
Indoor track	Winter	A	A	-	1997, 2003, 2005
Swimming	Winter	B	-	-	1987, 1988
Ice hockey	Winter	-	-	-	2000, 2001
Lacrosse	Spring	B	B	-	1969, 1971, 1976, 1977, 1986, 2007, 2008, 2019, 2022, 2023
Track & Field	Spring	A	A	-	1982, 1983, 1988, 1989, 1990, 2005, 2006, 2007, 2008
Baseball	Spring	A	A	A	1969, 1970, 1978, 1983, 1999, 2001, 2018
Tennis	Spring	B	-	-	1989, 1994, 1997, 1998, 1999, 2000
Golf	Spring	B	-	-

=== Fine arts and student media ===
Program	Medium	Frequency of appearance
Concert Band	Instrumental music	Two annual school concerts, special events, annual interscholastic competition
Jazz Ensemble	Instrumental music	Two annual school concerts, special events, annual interscholastic competition
Jazz Combo	Instrumental music	Special events
Alumni Jazz	Instrumental music	"All That Curley Jazz" annually
Drumline	Instrumental music	Athletic events, special events, annual interscholastic competition
School Choir	Choral music	Two annual school concerts, special events, school liturgies
Luminare Choir	Choral music	Special events
Schola	Choral music	Special events
Handbell Chorus	Choral music	Christmas concert annually
MasterClass	Choral music	Special arrangement annually
Blackfriars' Theatre	Drama	One fall stage play and one spring musical annually
Art Club	Visual arts	Annual spring art show
The Cord	School yearbook	One issue annually
The Curley Chronicle	School news service	Monthly issue

== Additional information ==
=== Connection with Franciscan Order ===
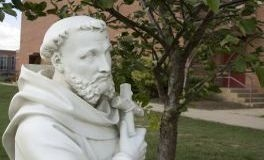
Curley is managed and staffed by the Order of Friars Minor, Conventual (Our Lady of the Angels Province)

The School Board established by the Archbishop of Baltimore is responsible for the general operation and management of Archbishop Curley High School. There are currently four Franciscan friars on the full-time staff, with one other in-residence. In addition to the Franciscan friars, the faculty includes lay teachers.

=== Other affiliations and recognitions ===
Archbishop Curley, as a school within the Archdiocese of Baltimore Department of Catholic Schools, is accredited through AdvancED until 30 June 2022.

The School Board received the Outstanding Board Award in 2007 from the National Catholic Educational Association.

== Head of school ==
From 1961 until 1995, the principal was head of school. Since 1995, the president is head of school. The principal still functions in the role of daily school management and as chief academic officer, reporting to the president. A gallery of formal portraits featuring all the past heads of school is on display in the auditorium lobby.

Head of school	Title	Years in office	Principal(s)
Fr. Aloysius Balcerak	Principal	1961–1967
Fr. Robert Grzybowski	Principal	1967–1971
Fr. David Stopyra	Principal	1971–1976
Fr. Leon Krop	Principal	1976–1979
Fr. Linus DeSantis	Principal	1979–1981
Fr. Mark Curesky	Principal	1981–1982
Fr. Xavier Nawrocki	Principal	1982–1985
Fr. Gregory Hartmayer	Principal	1985–1988
Fr. Robert Twele	Principal	1988–1994
Fr. Donald Grzymski '70	Principal	1994–1995
President	1995–2001	Fr. Paul Reinhardt (1995–96); Fr. Michael Martin '79 (1996–2001)
Fr. Michael Martin '79	President	2001–2010	Barry Brownlee (2001–2011)
Fr. Joseph Benicewicz '78	President	2010–2014	Barry Brownlee (2001–2011); Philip Piercy (2011–2014)
Fr. Donald Grzymski '70	President	2014– 2026	Brian Kolher (2014–2021); Jeremy Joseph (2021–2026)
Mr. Jeremy Joseph ‘96	President || 2026–present||: Kenneth J. Pipkin (2026–present)

== Current administration ==
- President - Jeremy Joseph ‘96
- Principal - Kenneth Pipkin

== Notable alumni ==
Name	Class year	Notability	References
Deonte Harris	2015	NFL wide receiver and kick returner for the Baltimore Ravens. He was named to the Baltimore Sun's First Team All Metro for high school football in 2014 when he led the Friars to their first undefeated season in school history and the Maryland Interscholastic Athletic Association (MIAA) B Conference Championship. That season, Harris had 2,030 yards of total offense, with 25 touchdowns in 10 games, and scored five touchdowns in the MIAA championship game. He played college football at Assumption College where he was named the Northeast-10 Conference Rookie of the Year in 2015, and went on to become a first team All American, breaking several school and NCAA records.	
Avery Williams	2012	CFL Middle Linebacker In the 2021 season, Williams played in 13 regular season games for the Ottawa Redblacks where he had 89 defensive tackles, two sacks, one forced fumble, and his first career interception.[5] He had his best career game in the opening game of the season where he recorded a franchise record-tying 14 defensive tackles and also one sack on August 7, 2021, in the win over the Edmonton Elks.[5][11] At the end of the season, Williams was once again named the team's Most Outstanding Defensive Player and CFL East All-Star. Williams played college football for the Temple from 2013 to 2016.[1] He became a full time starter at the strong side linebacker spot in his senior year in 2016 and appeared in 14 games, having 66 total tackles, with nine tackles for losses, two sacks, two forced fumbles and two recoveries.[1] Following his productive 2016 season, Williams was named to the All-AAC Second-team.	
William J. Frank	1978	Former member of the Maryland House of Delegates, representing District 42.	
Michael Ranneberger	1967	Current United States Ambassador to Kenya.	
John Tucker	1979	2010 inductee into the National Lacrosse Hall of Fame and a 2003 inductee into the Greater Baltimore Chapter of the Lacrosse Hall of Fame; he was a midfielder for Johns Hopkins University's 1984 Division I NCAA National Championship lacrosse team; was named to the U.S. Men's National Lacrosse team in 1986 and was its Captain in 1990 and 1994. He played professionally for the Philadelphia Wings, winning two National Lacrosse League championships and a league MVP. For several seasons he was the coach of Major League Lacrosse's Washington Bayhawks; his second coaching stint in the MLL after the Los Angeles Riptide. He was also the head coach of the West in the 2007 Major League Lacrosse All-Star Game during his tenure with the Riptide.	
Byron Pitts	1978	National correspondent for the CBS Evening News and the author of Step Out on Nothing: How Faith and Family Helped Me Conquer Life's Challenges.	
Jim Jagielski	1979	FOSS leader, the co-founder and president of the Apache Software Foundation, a director of the Open Source Initiative.	
Santino Quaranta		Professional soccer player in Major League Soccer, attended the school in his freshman and second years as a starter on varsity soccer.	
Mickey Cucchiella		Comedian and radio personality, imorning disc jockey on 98 Rock in Baltimore. He attended Curley for his first year.	

== See also ==
- National Catholic Educational Association
