= 2021 Ottawa Redblacks season =

Canadian football team season

- General manager: Marcel Desjardins (until October 25, 2021); Jeremy Snyder (interim)
- President: Mark Goudie
- Head coach: Paul LaPolice
- Home stadium: TD Place Stadium

Results
- Record: 3–11
- Division place: 4th, East
- Playoffs: did not qualify
- Team MOP: DeVonte Dedmon
- Team MODP: Avery Williams
- Team MOC: Lewis Ward
- Team MOOL: Mark Korte
- Team MOST: DeVonte Dedmon
- Team MOR: Ryan Davis

Uniform
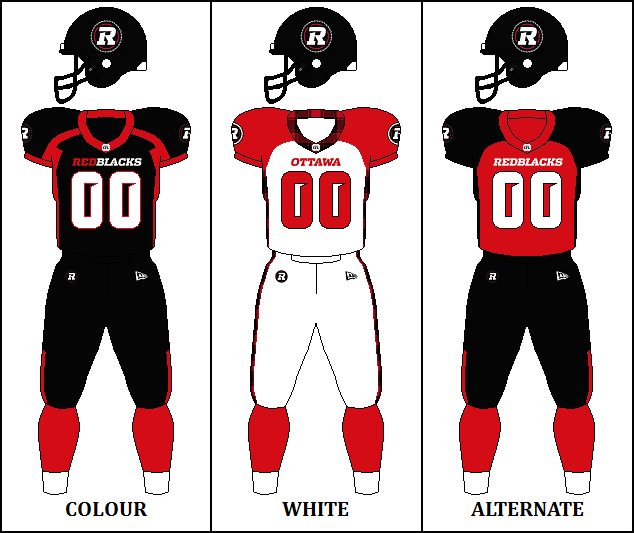

The 2021 Ottawa Redblacks season was the seventh season for the team in the Canadian Football League (CFL). The Redblacks were eliminated from postseason contention following their week 10 loss to the Hamilton Tiger-Cats on October 23, 2021. This was the second straight season that the Redblacks failed to qualify for the playoffs.

The 2021 season was the first season for Paul LaPolice as the team's head coach and the seventh season with Marcel Desjardins as general manager, until his dismissal on October 25, 2021.

An 18-game season schedule was originally released on November 20, 2020, but it was announced on April 21, 2021 that the start of the season would likely be delayed until August and feature a 14-game schedule. On June 15, 2021, the league released the revised 14-game schedule with regular season play beginning on August 5, 2021.

== Offseason ==
=== CFL global draft ===
The 2021 CFL global draft took place on April 15, 2021. With the format being a snake draft, the Redblacks selected last in the odd-numbered rounds and first in the even-numbered rounds.

Round	Pick	Player	Position	University/Club Team	Nationality
1	9	Anthony Mahoungou	REC	Purdue	France
2	10	Tyron Vrede	LB	North Dakota	Netherlands
3	27	Chris Ferguson	OL	Cincinnati	The Bahamas
4	28	Tony Anderson	DB	Grand View	France

== CFL national draft ==
The 2021 CFL draft took place on May 4, 2021. The Redblacks had six selections in the six-round snake draft and had the sixth pick in odd rounds and the fourth pick in even rounds.

Round	Pick	Player	Position	University team	Hometown
1	6	Deshawn Stevens	LB	Maine	Toronto, ON
2	13	Alonzo Addae	DB	West Virginia	Pickering, ON
3	24	Connor Berglof	OL	Saskatchewan	Saskatoon, SK
4	31	Jake Julien	K/P	Eastern Michigan	Barrie, ON
5	42	Keegan Markgraf	LS	Utah	Hamilton, ON
6	49	Matthew Derks	OL	Delaware State	Brantford, ON

== Preseason ==
Due to the shortening of the season, the CFL confirmed that pre-season games would not be played in 2021.

=== Planned schedule ===
Week	Game	Date	Kickoff	Opponent	TV	Venue
A	Bye					
B	1	Fri, May 28	7:30 p.m. EDT	at Montreal Alouettes	NA	Molson Stadium
C	2	Fri, June 4	7:30 p.m. EDT	vs. Montreal Alouettes	NA	TD Place Stadium

== Regular season ==
=== Standings ===
East Division
Team	GP	W	L	T	Pts	PF	PA	Div	Stk	
Toronto Argonauts	14	9	5	0	18	309	318	6–2	L1	Details
Hamilton Tiger-Cats	14	8	6	0	16	312	244	4–4	W1	Details
Montreal Alouettes	14	7	7	0	14	356	295	5–3	L1	Details
Ottawa Redblacks	14	3	11	0	6	224	384	1–7	W1	Details

=== Schedule ===
The Redblacks initially had a schedule that featured 18 regular season games beginning on June 11 and ending on October 29. However, due to the COVID-19 pandemic in Canada, the Canadian Football League delayed the start of the regular season to August 5, 2021 and the Redblacks began their 14-game season on August 7, 2021.

Week	Game	Date	Kickoff	Opponent	Results		TV	Venue	Attendance	Summary
Week	Game	Date	Kickoff	Opponent	Score	Record	TV	Venue	Attendance	Summary
1	1	Sat, Aug 7	10:00 p.m. EDT	@ Edmonton Elks	W 16–12	1–0	TSN/RDS2/ESPN2	Commonwealth Stadium	30,302	Recap
2	Bye									
3	2	Sat, Aug 21	7:00 p.m. EDT	@ Saskatchewan Roughriders	L 10–23	1–1	TSN/RDS	Mosaic Stadium	28,559	Recap
4	3	Sat, Aug 28	7:00 p.m. EDT	BC Lions	L 12–24	1–2	TSN/RDS	TD Place Stadium	15,000	Recap
5	4	Fri, Sept 3	7:30 p.m. EDT	Montreal Alouettes	L 29–51	1–3	TSN/RDS	TD Place Stadium	15,000	Recap
6	5	Sat, Sept 11	10:00 p.m. EDT	@ BC Lions	L 13–45	1–4	TSN/RDS	BC Place	12,552	Recap
7	Bye									
8	6	Wed, Sept 22	7:30 p.m. EDT	Hamilton Tiger-Cats	L 7–24	1–5	TSN/RDS2	TD Place Stadium	12,041	Recap
9	7	Tues, Sept 28	7:30 p.m. EDT	Edmonton Elks	W 34–24	2–5	TSN/RDS2	TD Place Stadium	12,108	Recap
10	8	Wed, Oct 6	7:30 p.m. EDT	@ Toronto Argonauts	L 16–35	2–6	TSN/RDS2	BMO Field	6,788	Recap
10	9	Mon, Oct 11	1:00 p.m. EDT	@ Montreal Alouettes	L 16–20	2–7	TSN/RDS	Molson Stadium	15,236	Recap
11	10	Sat, Oct 16	4:00 p.m. EDT	Montreal Alouettes	L 16–27	2–8	TSN/RDS	TD Place Stadium	16,139	Recap
12	11	Sat, Oct 23	4:00 p.m. EDT	@ Hamilton Tiger-Cats	L 3–32	2–9	TSN/RDS2	Tim Hortons Field	20,112	Recap
13	12	Fri, Oct 29	7:00 p.m. EDT	Calgary Stampeders	L 13–26	2–10	TSN	TD Place Stadium	15,280	Recap
14	13	Sat, Nov 6	4:00 p.m. EDT	Toronto Argonauts	L 20–23	2–11	TSN/RDS2	TD Place Stadium	18,644	Recap
15	Bye									
16	14	Fri, Nov 19	7:30 p.m. EST	@ Montreal Alouettes	W 19–18	3–11	TSN/RDS	Molson Stadium	11,297	Recap

# Games played with white uniforms.
# Games played with colour uniforms.
# Games played with alternate uniforms.

== Roster ==
2021 Ottawa Redblacks final roster
**Quarterbacks**: 5 Caleb Evans; 7 Devlin Hodges; **Running backs**: 20 Timothy Flanders; **Receivers**: 80 Nate Behar; 8 Anthony Coombs; 15 Ryan Davis; 17 DeVonte Dedmon; 89 Marco Dubois; 84 R. J. Harris; 83 Wesley Lewis; 18 Jordan Smallwood; 85 Kenny Stafford	**Offensive linemen**: 67 Kétel Assé T; 56 Jaylen Guthrie G; 65 Mark Korte C/T; 57 Andrew Pickett G/C; 53 Jakub Szott G; 58 Taylor Tappin T; **Defensive linemen**: 96 Stefan Charles DT; 9 Davon Coleman DT; 98 Avery Ellis DE; 90 Cleyon Laing DT; 95 Praise Martin-Oguike DE; 99 Kene Onyeka DE; 47 Nigel Romick DE; **Special teams**: 13 Richie Leone P/K; 10 Lewis Ward K	**Linebackers**: 32 Adam Auclair; 24 Micah Awe; 44 Dan Basambombo; 33 Frédéric Chagnon LS; 38 Christophe Mulumba-Tshimanga; 36 Dwayne Norman; 43 Shaheed Salmon; 46 Tyron Vrede; 42 Avery Williams; **Defensive backs**: 30 Treshaun Abrahams-Webster; 29 Jordan Beaulieu; 37 Brandin Dandridge; 2 Randall Evans; 28 Frankie Griffin; 21 Justin Howell; 14 Abdul Kanneh; 39 Ranthony Texada; 0 Don Unamba	**Practice roster**: 41 Tony Anderson DB; 48 Patrick Carr RB; 22 Douglas Coleman DB; 93 Reshaan Davis DE; 9 Tom Flacco QB; 58 Zach Greenberg LS; 34 Gump Hayes DB; 75 Tre Hornbuckle DE; 87 Michael Klukas WR; 97 Clement Lebreux DT; 19 Anthony Mahoungou WR; 19 José Maltos K; 91 Chigozie Nnoruka DT; 79 Qaadir Sheppard DE; 76 Howard Stephens DE; 88 Terry Williams SB; **Suspended list**: – Amba Etta-Tawo WR; – Alex Fontana G; – Akeem Hunt RB; – Shaneil Jenkins DT; – Charone Peake WR; – Cortrelle Simpson WR; – Shamarko Thomas DB	**Injured list**: 27 Sherrod Baltimore DB; 94 Frank Beltre DE; 50 Louis-Philippe Bourassa LS; 64 Dino Boyd T; 52 Juwann Bushell-Beatty G/T; 63 Tyler Catalina T; 3 Taryn Christion QB; 4 Dominique Davis QB; 61 Chris Ferguson T; 35 Jerod Fernandez LB; 25 Brendan Gillanders RB; 45 Anthony Gosselin FB; 58 Stansly Maponga DE; 66 Nolan MacMillan G; 55 Jamar McGloster T; 92 Ese Mrabure-Ajufo DT; 23 Brad Muhammad DB; 16 Matt Nichols QB; 81 Daniel Petermann WR; 86 Ervin Phillips WR; 6 Antoine Pruneau DB; 51 Na'ty Rodgers T; 49 De'Lance Turner RB
Italics indicate American player • **Bold** indicates Global players

== Coaching staff ==
Ottawa Redblacks staff
Front office: Owner – Ottawa Sports and Entertainment Group (OSEG); Chief executive officer – Mark Goudie; Interim general manager – Jeremy Snyder; Interim assistant general manager – Jean-Marc Edmé; Director of player personnel – Pier-Yves Lavergne; Coordinator of football operations – Joey Swarbrick; Video coordinator – Braun Gheller; Head coaches: Head coach – Paul LaPolice; Offensive coaches: Receivers – Alex Suber; Offensive line – Bob Wylie; Quarterbacks – Steve Walsh	Defensive coaches: Defensive coordinator – Mike Benevides; Defensive line – Carey Bailey; Linebackers – Patrick Bourgon; Defensive backs – Greg Knox; Special teams coaches: Special teams coordinator – Bob Dyce; Strength and conditioning: Strength and conditioning coordinator – Nick Mercuri; → Coaching staff
