= Terry Williams (wide receiver) =

American gridiron football player (born 1996)

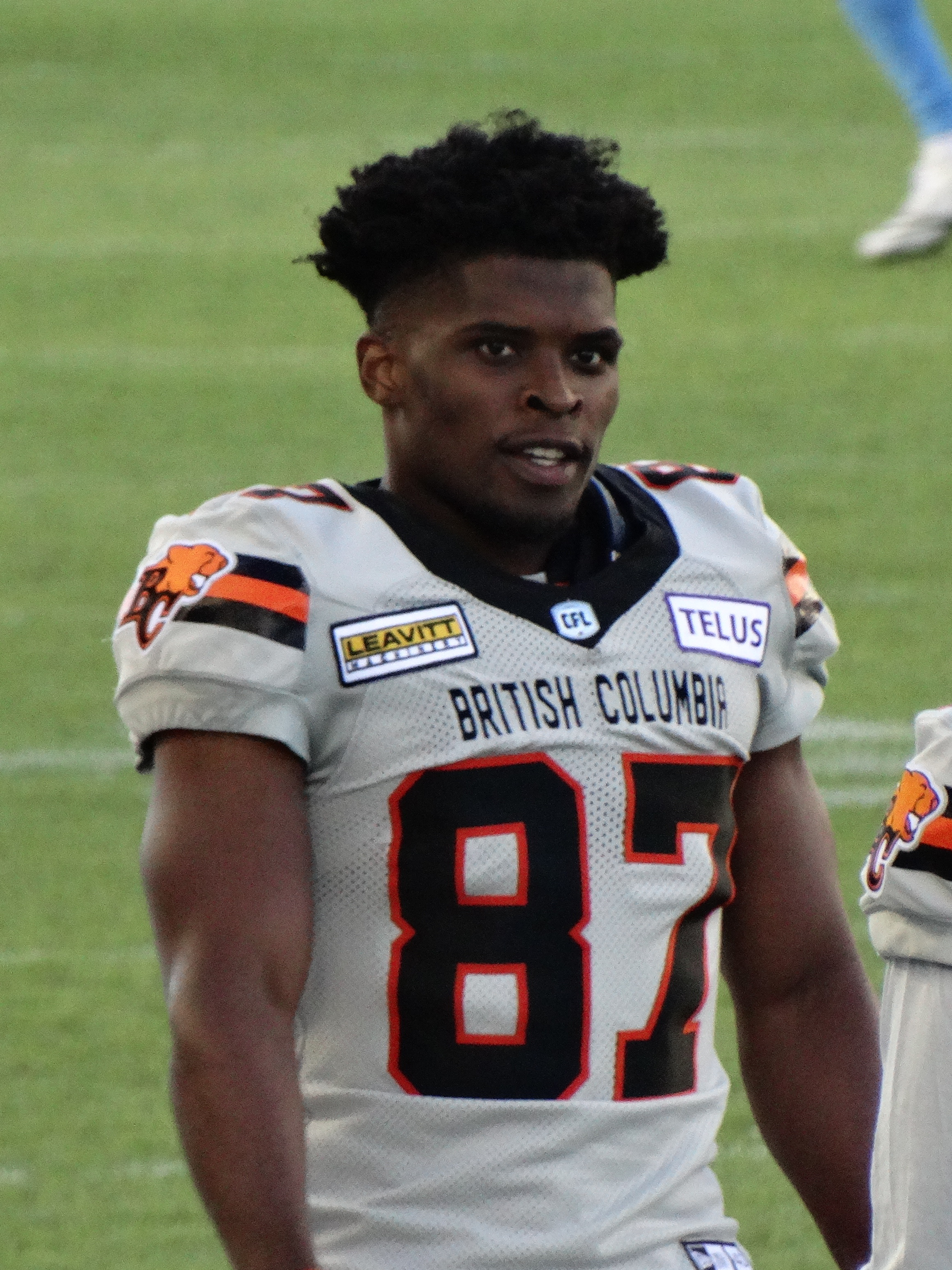
- Williams with the BC Lions in 2024

Profile
- Positions: Wide receiver, kick returner

Personal information
- Born: April 8, 1996 (age 30); Greenwood, Mississippi, U.S.
- Listed height: 5 ft 9 in (1.75 m)
- Listed weight: 170 lb (77 kg)

Career information
- High school: Southaven (Southaven, Mississippi)
- College: Itawamba CC; Tennessee-Martin

Career history
- 2021–2022: Ottawa Redblacks
- 2022–2024: BC Lions
- Stats at CFL.ca

Terry Williams (born April 8, 1996) is an American professional football wide receiver and kick returner. He previously played in the Canadian Football League (CFL). He played college football for the UT Martin Skyhawks.

== College career ==
=== Itawamba Community College ===
Williams first played college football for the Itawamba Community College Indians from 2016 to 2017. In 2017, he recorded 1,095 receiving yards and became the program's all-time leading receiver.

=== Tennessee-Martin ===
On December 20, 2017, it was announced that Williams had signed a National Letter of Intent to play for the UT Martin Skyhawks in 2018. He played in 23 games in two seasons for the program where he had 125 catches for 1,317 yards and six touchdowns. He also had 40 punt returns for 608 yards and two touchdowns.

== Professional career ==
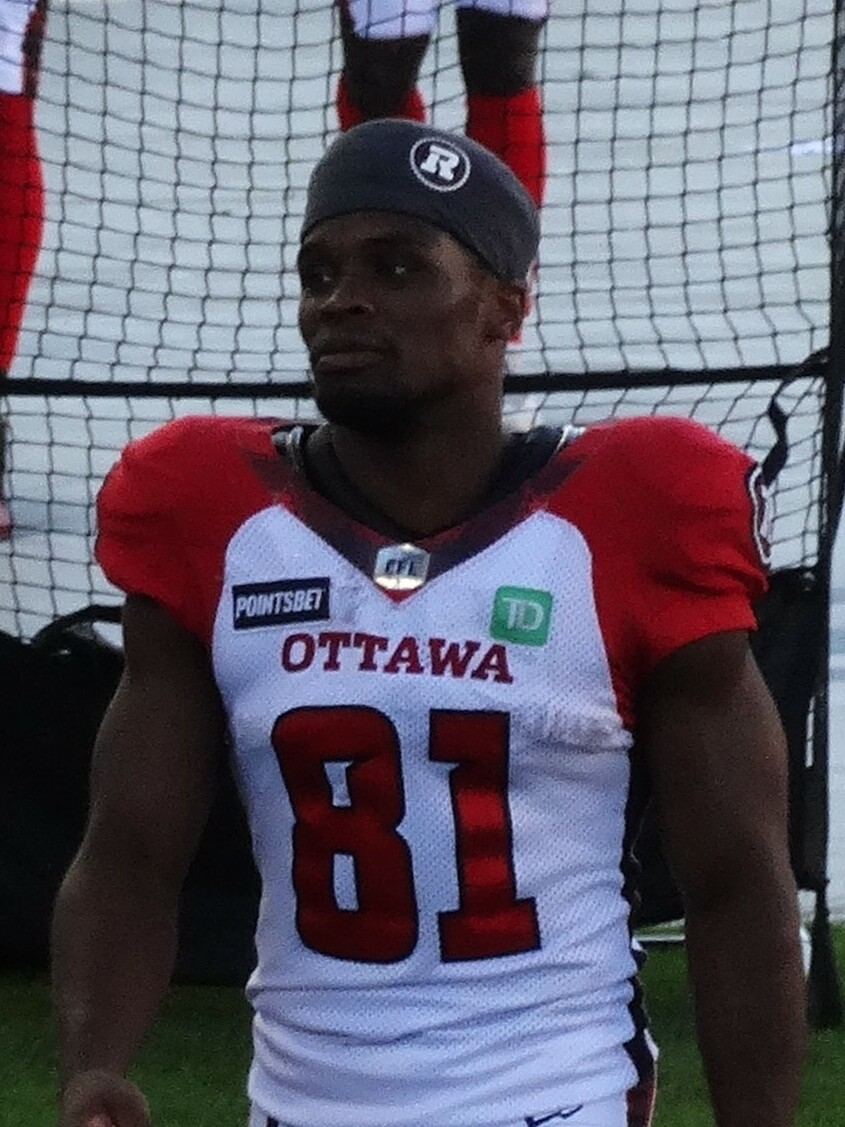
Williams with the Ottawa Redblacks in 2022

=== Ottawa Redblacks ===
On January 18, 2021, it was announced that Williams had signed with the Ottawa Redblacks. He was released following training camp on July 29, 2021, but re-signed with the team on September 12, 2021, and was placed on the practice roster. He later played in his first professional game on October 23, 2021, against the Hamilton Tiger-Cats, where he had seven punt returns for 62 yards and four kickoff returns for 66 yards. He played in two regular season games before returning to the practice roster. He re-signed with the team for the 2022 season on November 20, 2021.

In 2022, Williams opened the season as the team's primary punt and kick returner and played in the first nine games where he led the league with 36 kickoff returns for 914 yards and also had 31 punt returns for 306 yards. Following the signing of DeVonte Dedmon, Williams was placed on the injured list on August 26, 2022, as a healthy scratch.

=== BC Lions ===
On September 4, 2022, it was announced that Williams had been traded to the BC Lions in exchange for a third-round selection in the 2023 CFL draft and a conditional selection in the 2024 CFL Draft. He played in eight games with the Lions where he had 36 punt returns for 336 yards, 25 kickoff returns for 612 yards, and six missed field goal returns for 216 yards.

In 2023, Williams played in 18 regular season games where he had 74 punt returns for 878 yards, 57 kickoff returns for 1,315 yards, and six missed field goal returns for 239 yards and one touchdown. In the 2024 season, he again played in 18 regular season games where he recorded 65 punt returns for 746 yards and 57 kickoff returns for 1,335 yards. He was released in the following off-season on December 23, 2024.

== Personal life ==
Williams was born to parents Angular Williams and Torris Robinson. He has four siblings, Tia, Tamare, Montez, and Lashanda.
