= Lewis Ward =

Lewis Ward is the name of:

- Lewis Ward (Canadian football), Canadian football player
- Lewis Ward (footballer), English footballer
