= Bayridge Secondary School =

Location
- 1059 Taylor-Kidd Boulevard; Kingston, Ontario, K7M 6J9; Canada; 44°15′02″N 76°35′46″W

Information
- School type: Public, Secondary
- Motto: Veneratio Bene Virtus Pietas (Latin) (Respect, Optimism, Courage, Kindness)
- Founded: 1974
- School board: Limestone District School Board
- Area trustee: George Beavis
- School number: 893773
- Administrator: Margaret Berridge
- Principal: Heather Highet Rhonda Beck
- Grades: 9-12
- Enrollment: 620 (June 2016)
- Language: English
- Campus: Suburban
- Area: Bayridge (West Kingston)
- Colours: Royal Blue and Orange
- Mascot: Bengal Tiger
- Team name: Blazers
- Feeder schools: Bayridge P.S; Lancaster Drive P.S. Cataraqui woods E.S. Calvin Park P.S. Truedell P.S. R. G. Sinclair P.S.
- Website: bayridgess.limestone.on.ca

Bayridge Secondary School is a secondary school located in Kingston, Ontario, Canada, offering grades 9 to 12. The school is located in the former Kingston Township, in a neighborhood known as Bayridge, and is part of the Limestone District School Board.

== History ==
Built in 1974, it consists of 757 students from the built-up area of the Bayridge subdivision east to Amherstview. Bayridge has a second off-site campus, the Bayridge Learning Centre, at Progress Avenue. This caters to about 150, mainly adult, students who are at risk of dropping out, or who do not fit into a regular classroom environment. The main campus consists of a large football/soccer field, gymnasium, cafeteria and auditorium, multiple computer labs, library/resource centre, musical facilities, and a unique social place called 'The Bearpit'. On the exterior, the campus is surrounded by a greenspace, student and faculty parking lots, and the O'Connor Sports field, where home games are played in football, rugby, soccer, and field hockey.

In 2009, a renovation of both the school and the school grounds were completed. The "Island" that existed in front of the school was made into two large traffic circles with smaller greenspaces, to facilitate an easy in-and-out access to the front doors for cars and buses, respectively. The main entrance lobby was also raised to the main level of the school's first floor, whereas it used to sit on the "Cafeteria floor".

In addition to renovations of the school's front grounds and facade, a new wing was added to the rear of the school, and includes new classrooms and lockers. Some of the specialized classrooms in the new wing are the Kitchen/Home Economics room, and the Media room, which has a "green screen".

The school was originally opened with an "open concept" learning environment as part of a number of experimental educational concepts undertaken in Ontario in the 1970s. These concepts were generally abandoned by the early 1980s, when a more traditional environment was adopted.

== Athletics ==
Bayridge is currently a member of the KASSAA, EOSSAA, OFSAA, and OSEA athletic associations. The school's sports teams play under the name Blazers with a team mascot of the Bengal tiger. O'Connor Sports Field is the school's home field. It provides teams in several sports including Bayridge football, basketball, volleyball, lacrosse, baseball, tennis, track and Field, badminton, cross country, and curling. School teams have earned KASSAA titles, Eastern Ontario Championship titles, and made Provincial championship appearances. Bayridge has also made National and Provincial appearances for Rocket League.

=== Soccer ===
Throughout the 1980s, Bayridge soccer teams captured many AA championships in Eastern Ontario. In 1986, the Bayridge senior boys soccer team competed at the OFSAA championships in Toronto.

The Bayridge senior boys soccer team was undefeated in 2006 and was the Senior Boys Eastern Ontario Champions. The Blazers lost 3-1 in the quarter finals to the eventual champion Bishop Reding (Milton) the goal scored by forward Lee Jones, from a cross delivered by winger Scott MacLeod. In the regular season the Blazers defeated the AAA OFSAA champion Regiopolis-Notre Dame Panthers 4-1 in the season opener.

=== Cheerleading ===
The Cheerleading squad was National Champions in the Small Varsity All Girls Division in 2004/05 and Finalists in 2005/06. The varsity cheerleading team has members on the roster of the Kingston Elite All-Star Cheerleading Company.

=== Volleyball ===
Coached by Brian Nesbitt, the Blazers' senior boys volleyball team experienced a great deal of success in the mid 1990s. They captured four consecutive KASSAA and EOSSAA championships from 1994–97, and competed at the provincial championships, OFSAA, each of those years. From 1994 to 1996, they were led by captain Bryan English, who after graduating, went on to captain the Queen's University volleyball team, and twice was an OUA all-star.

=== Rocket League ===
Nationals

Since their opening year in 2022, Bayridge has competed in the National Scholastic Rocket League Championships three times, winning the tournament once.

Extended Results

Year	Event	Placement	Location
2022	National Scholastic Rocket League Championships (Fall)	1st	Online
2022	OSEA Provincials (Fall)	Top 4	Online
2023	OSEA Provincials (Spring)	3rd	St. Clair College
2023	OSEA Provincials (Fall)	Top 4	Online
2024	OSEA Provincials (Spring)	2nd	St. Clair College
2024	OSEA Provincials (Fall)	Top 4	Online
2024	National Scholastic Rocket League Championships (Fall)	3rd	Online
2025	OSEA Provincials (Spring)	2nd	St. Clair College
2025	OSEA Provincials (Fall)	2nd	Online
2025	National Scholastic Rocket League Championships (Fall)	Top 8	Online

Game Scores

== Notable alumni ==
- Matt Brash - pitcher, Seattle Mariners (MLB)
- Oamo Culbreath - offensive lineman, Calgary Stampeders (CFL)
- Michael Giffin - fullback, Montreal Alouettes (CFL)
- Kirk Muller - NHL player
- Kaity Biggar - winner of the twenty-seventh season of The Bachelor
- Pat Pengelly - former drummer of band Bedouin Soundclash
- Chris Stewart - right wing, Anaheim Ducks (NHL)
- Bobby Bolt - London Knights and Kingston Frontenacs (OHL), (drafted by) NHL's Anaheim Ducks for Portland Pirates (AHL), Augusta Lynx and Bakersfield Condors (ECHL), Muskegon Lumberjacks (USHL)
- Lewis Ward (Canadian football) Canadian Football League Kicker

== See also ==
- Education in Ontario
- List of secondary schools in Ontario
