= Lewis Ward (Canadian football) =

Canadian gridiron football player (born 1992)

- Ward with the Montreal Alouettes in 2026

No. 71 – Montreal Alouettes
- Position: Placekicker
- Roster status: Reserve
- CFL status: National

Personal information
- Born: 2 September 1992 (age 34); England
- Listed height: 5 ft 7 in (1.70 m)
- Listed weight: 175 lb (79 kg)

Career information
- High school: Bayridge Secondary
- University: Ottawa
- CFL draft: 2017: undrafted

Career history
- 2018–2025: Ottawa Redblacks
- 2026*: Montreal Alouettes
- 2026: Ottawa Redblacks
- 2026–present: Montreal Alouettes

Awards and highlights
- CFL Most Outstanding Rookie (2018); CFL Most Outstanding Special Teams Player (2018); Frank M. Gibson Trophy (2018); CFL All-Star (2018); CFL East All-Star (2018); Professional football record for most consecutive field goals made (69) (2018–19); CFL single season record for field goal percentage (98.1%) (2018)

Career CFL statistics as of 2026
- Games played: 120
- Field goals made: 304
- Field goals attempted: 352
- Field goal %: 86.4%
- Longest field goal: 56
- Stats at CFL.ca

Lewis Ward (born 2 September 1992) is an English-Canadian professional football placekicker for the Montreal Alouettes of the Canadian Football League (CFL). He played U Sports football at the University of Ottawa for the Gee-Gees.

== Early life ==
Ward was born in England, and moved with his family to Kingston, Ontario when he was in the middle of grade eight. He was raised in a soccer loving household and grew up playing soccer himself. Ward attended Bayridge Secondary School in Kingston and played several high school sports including football, soccer, basketball and rugby. He became the first inductee into the school's Sports Hall of Fame.

== University career ==
Ward played for the Ottawa Gee-Gees from 2013 to 2017 as he became one of the best kickers in Gee-Gees and U Sports history. He finished his university career having converted 89 successful field goals, which is the most in program and conference history. It is also second all-time in U Sports history to Johnny Mark's 91 career field goals. He is also the leading scorer in Gee-Gees football history with 412 points and third all-time in U Sports.

== Professional career ==
=== Ottawa Redblacks (first stint) ===
Ward went undrafted in the 2017 CFL draft and instead returned to school for his fifth year of eligibility. Following a successful 2017 season, he signed with the Ottawa Redblacks on 3 January 2018. Following the departure of 2017 kicker, Brett Maher, the Redblacks had an open competition for their kicking position between Ward, Richie Leone, Sergio Castillo, and Mathieu Hebert. He went 4-for-4 on field goal attempts in the pre-season and won the starting placekicking job with Leone handling punts and kickoffs.

On 28 July 2018, Ward tied an Ottawa Football Club record by making seven field goals in a single game, tying him with Terry Baker in 1984 and Dean Dorsey in 1989. On 11 August 2018, he set the all-time CFL rookie record for consecutive field goals made with 22, surpassing Luca Congi's benchmark of 21. He continued that streak to 22 September 2018 in a game against the Edmonton Eskimos, where he broke Rene Paredes' single-season consecutive field goal record of 32 made in 2016 with his 33rd straight in the second quarter of that game. In that same game, he again made all seven of his field goal attempts, tying his own club record and extending his streak to 37 consecutive field goals made. In the following game against the Winnipeg Blue Bombers, he broke the all-time consecutive field goal record of 39 made, also by Paredes, over the 2012-2013 seasons, by connecting on all three of his field goal attempts to bring his streak to 40. On 19 October 2018, against the Hamilton Tiger-Cats, Ward broke the professional football record of 44 consecutive field goals made by breaking Adam Vinatieri's record from the National Football League with his 45th straight field goal. He finished the 2018 regular season having made 51 field goals out of 52 attempts, shattering Paredes' single-season field goal accuracy record of 94.74% with a completion percentage of 98.08%. His single season consecutive field goal streak finished at 48 made by the end of the regular season. He was named as the Redblacks' nominee for the league's Most Outstanding Rookie and Most Outstanding Special Teams Player. At the 2018 Shaw CFL Awards ceremony, he won both awards, becoming the first ever kicker to win the Most Outstanding Rookie Award.

Ward's consecutive field goal streak continued into the 2019 season, including in a game on 5 July 2019 where he made a career-long field goal of 53 yards. On 17 August 2019, Ward was wide right on a 34-yard field goal attempt, ending his consecutive field goal streak at 69 made. Later in the season, on 19 October 2019, Ward set a new franchise record by successfully connecting on a 56-yard field goal, the longest in Ottawa professional football history. He did not play in 2020 due to the cancellation of the 2020 CFL season and signed a one-year extension with the Redblacks on 14 January 2021. On November 4, 2021, near the end of the 2021 season, the Redblacks announced that they had signed Ward to a contract extension that will keep him with the club through the 2022 season.

On April 16, 2026, it was announced that Ward had been released by the Redblacks.

=== Montreal Alouettes (first stint) ===
On June 16, 2026, the Montreal Alouettes announced that Ward had signed a practice roster agreement with the team. He was released on June 29.

=== Ottawa Redblacks (second stint) ===
On July 26, 2026, Ward signed again with the Redblacks following an injury to Brett Lauther. He played in two games and was successful on two field goal attempts, but was one of three on conversion attempts. He was placed on the practice roster upon Lauther's return and eventually released on September 4, 2026.

=== Montreal Alouettes (second stint) ===
Following an injury to incumbent kicker, José Maltos Díaz, Ward was signed by the Alouettes on October 21, 2026.
