= Marcel Desjardins =

Canadian football executive

Montreal Alouettes
- Title: Assistant to general manager and player personnel

Personal information
- Born: May 19, 1966 (age 60); Burlington, Ontario, Canada

Career information
- College: Laurentian

Career history
- 1999–2001: Montreal Alouettes (Asst. Director of Football Operations)
- 2002–2006: Montreal Alouettes (Asst. General manager)
- 2006–2007: Hamilton Tiger-Cats (General manager)
- 2008–2012: Montreal Alouettes (Asst. General manager)
- 2013–2021: Ottawa Redblacks (General manager)
- 2024–present: Montreal Alouettes (Asst. to general manager and player personnel)

Awards and highlights
- 4× Grey Cup champion (2002, 2009, 2010, 2016)

Marcel Desjardins (born May 19, 1966) is a Canadian football executive who is currently the assistant to the general manager and player personnel for the Montreal Alouettes of the Canadian Football League (CFL). He has also served as the general manager for the Hamilton Tiger-Cats for two seasons and the Ottawa Redblacks for eight seasons. He is a four time Grey Cup champion, having won his first three with the Alouettes and his fourth with the Redblacks in 2016. Desjardins is a graduate of the Sports Administration program at Laurentian University in Sudbury, Ontario.

== Administrative career ==
=== Montreal Alouettes ===
Desjardins first joined the Montreal Alouettes as the team's assistant director of football operations in 1999. He was promoted to the position of assistant general manager in 2002 and won his first Grey Cup championship as the Alouettes won the 90th Grey Cup that year. He spent four and a half seasons as the Alouettes' assistant GM where the team played in three Grey Cup games over that period.

=== Hamilton Tiger-Cats ===
On August 29, 2006, Desjardins was named the general manager of the Hamilton Tiger-Cats, replacing the team's interim general manager, Rob Katz. Desjardins took over a 2–9 Tiger-Cats team that had already fired their head coach, Greg Marshall, their offensive coordinator, Joe Paopao, and their offensive line coach, Kani Kauahi. The Tiger-Cats won two more games with Desjardins as the GM and finished with a 4–14 record. He hired former Alouettes head coach, Charlie Taaffe, to lead the team, but Desjardins' first full season with the Tiger-Cats with a 3–15 record. Notably, he had signed Casey Printers midway through the season and traded away incumbent starter, Jason Maas, but the team's offence still struggled. The biggest challenge facing Desjardins going into 2007 was the introduction of the CFL salary cap which required him to slash as much as $1 million from player salaries as a result of excessive contracts being given to players prior to his arrival. He was fired at the end of the season on November 5, 2007.

=== Montreal Alouettes (II) ===
Desjardins returned to the Montreal Alouettes to once again serve as the team's assistant general manager on December 5, 2007. He spent another five years with the Alouettes and won his second and third Grey Cups as the team won championships in 2009 and 2010.

=== Ottawa Redblacks ===
Desjardins received his second opportunity to assemble a CFL team as he was named the general manager for the expansion Ottawa Redblacks on January 30, 2013. After a dismal 2–16 inaugural season, Desjardins quickly assembled a competitive team as the Redblacks finished with a 12–6 record in 2015 and an appearance in the 103rd Grey Cup. In just their third season of existence, Desjardins' Redblacks won the first Grey Cup in forty years for an Ottawa CFL team as they defeated the Calgary Stampeders in the 104th Grey Cup game. The team remained competitive as they returned to the Grey Cup in 2018, but the Redblacks lost the game to the Stampeders.

The team experienced a substantial decline in 2019 as Desjardins chose not to re-sign certain players while others departed as they were looking to cash in on the success they had while in Ottawa. Trevor Harris, Greg Ellingson, William Powell, and SirVincent Rogers. The team also lost their offensive coordinator, Jaime Elizondo, to the XFL after he was not permitted to interview for a vacant CFL head coaching position. The team finished with a 3–15 record and the team's head coach, Rick Campbell, resigned due to a strained relationship with Desjardins.

Desjardins hired Paul LaPolice to be the Redblacks' new head coach and then traded the first overall draft pick in the 2020 CFL draft for quarterback, Nick Arbuckle. However, after being unable to comes to terms on a restructured contract with Arbuckle following a cancelled 2020 CFL season, Desjardins signed Matt Nichols and released Arbuckle.

Desjardins oversaw a Redblacks team that further went into decline in 2021. After starting the year with a 2–9 record and a record of 5–22 overall following their appearance in the 106th Grey Cup, Desjardins was relieved of his duties as general manager on October 25, 2021.

=== Montreal Alouettes (III) ===
On January 11, 2024, it was announced that Desjardins had returned to the Montreal Alouettes to serve as the team's assistant to the general manager and player personnel.
