= Avery Williams (linebacker) =

American football player (born 1994)

Avery A. Williams Sr
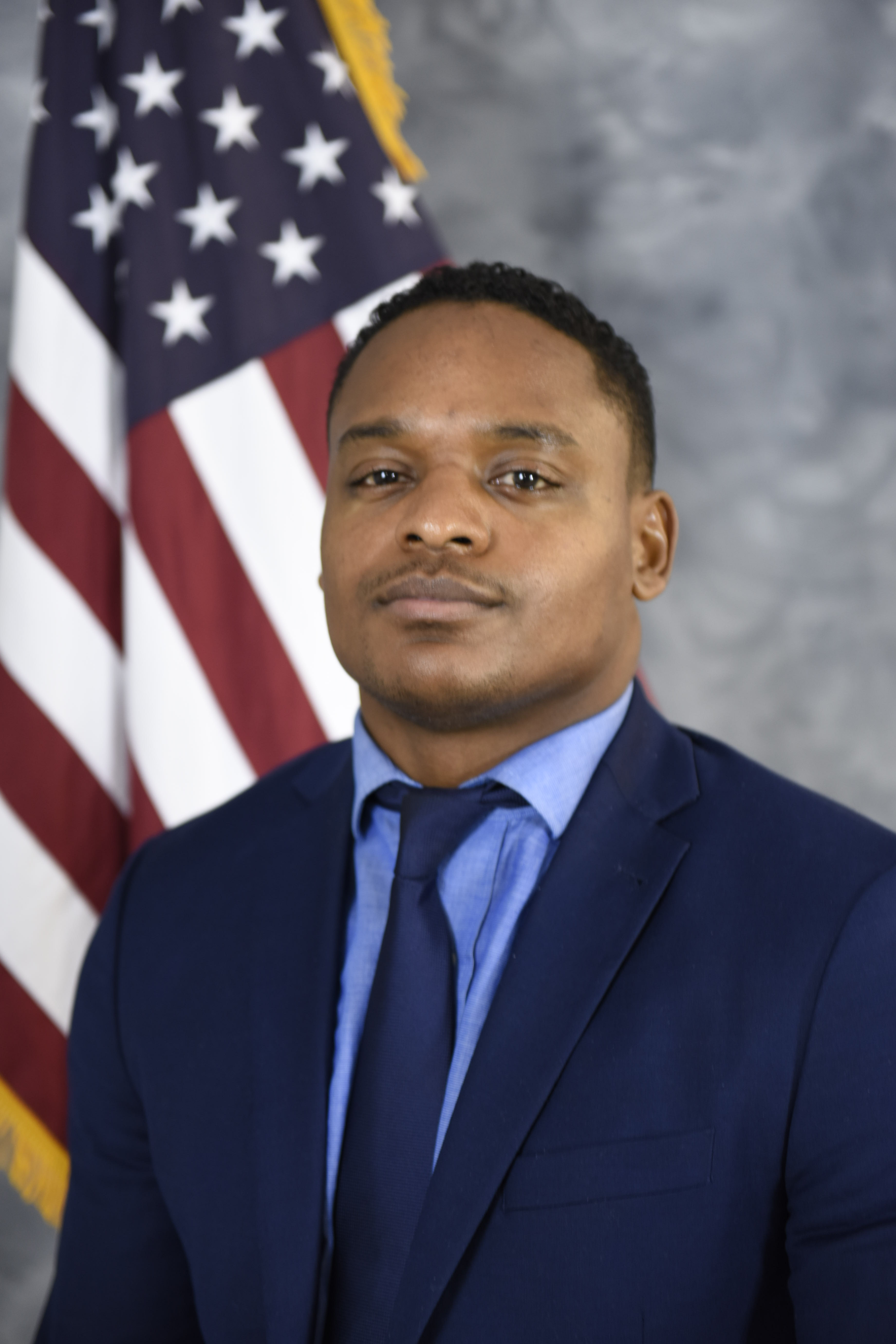

Profile
- Position: Linebacker

Personal information
- Born: September 2, 1994 (age 32); Baltimore, Maryland, U.S.
- Listed height: 5 ft 9 in (1.75 m)
- Listed weight: 225 lb (102 kg)

Career information
- High school: Baltimore (MD) Archbishop Curley
- College: Temple (2012–2016)
- NFL draft: 2017: undrafted

Career history
- Houston Texans (2017)*; Ottawa Redblacks (2018–2022); Montreal Alouettes (2023)
- * Offseason or practice squad member only

Awards and highlights
- Grey Cup champion (2023); CFL East All-Star (2021); Second-team All-AAC (2016); Champion AAC (2016)
- Stats at CFL.ca

Avery A. Williams Sr. (born September 2, 1994) is an American former professional football player. He previously played for the Ottawa Redblacks and Montreal Alouettes of the Canadian Football League (CFL). He was signed by the Houston Texans as an undrafted free agent after playing college football at Temple University.

== Early life ==
Williams played running back, wide receiver, linebacker, and defensive back for Archbishop Curley High School in Baltimore, Maryland.

== College career ==
After using a redshirt season in 2012, Williams played college football for the Temple Owls from 2013 to 2016. He became a full time starter at the strong side linebacker spot in his senior year in 2016 and appeared in 14 games, having 66 total tackles, with nine tackles for losses, two sacks, two forced fumbles and two recoveries. Following his productive 2016 season, Williams was named to the All-AAC Second Team.

== Professional career ==
Pre-draft measurables
Height	Weight	Arm length	Hand span	40-yard dash	10-yard split	20-yard split	20-yard shuttle	Three-cone drill	Vertical jump	Broad jump	Bench press
5 ft 9 1/8 in (1.76 m)	222 lb (101 kg)	29 3/4 in (0.76 m)	9 1/4 in (0.23 m)	4.70 s	1.63 s	2.68 s	4.33 s	7.21 s	29.0 in (0.74 m)	9 ft 2 in (2.79 m)	24 reps
All values from Pro Day

=== Houston Texans ===
Williams was signed by the Houston Texans as an undrafted free agent on May 12, 2017. He was waived on September 2, 2017.

=== Ottawa Redblacks ===
On January 8, 2018, Williams signed with the Ottawa Redblacks. He made the team's active roster following training camp and played in his first professional game on June 21, 2018, against the Saskatchewan Roughriders. In the third game of the 2018 season, on July 6, 2018, against the Montreal Alouettes, he made his first career start. On August 17, 2018, he scored his first career touchdown as he returned a Matt Nichols fumble 43 yards for the score in a victory over the Winnipeg Blue Bombers. He played in 17 regular season games in his rookie year, starting in 11 of them, where he had 43 defensive tackles, six special teams tackles, one sack, two forced fumbles, and one touchdown. He also started in his first two post-season games that year, including the Eastern Conference final game and the 106th Grey Cup,

In 2019, Williams had a strong start to the season as he recorded 69 defensive tackles in the team's first 11 games before he suffered a season-ending injury. Williams was the team's nominee for the CFL's Most Outstanding Player and Most Outstanding Defensive Player awards. He did not play in 2020 due to the cancellation of the 2020 CFL season. Instead, he re-signed with the Redblacks on February 3, 2021.

In the pandemic-shortened 2021 season, Williams played in 13 regular season games where he had 89 defensive tackles, two sacks, one forced fumble, and his first career interception. He had his best career game in the opening game of the season where he recorded a franchise record-tying 14 defensive tackles and also one sack on August 7, 2021, in the win over the Edmonton Elks. At the end of the season, Williams was once again named the team's Most Outstanding Defensive Player and CFL East All-Star. In 18 games in the 2022 season. Williams had a career high 92 defensive tackles, 2 special teams tackles, 2 tackles for loss, 2 sacks, 2 forced fumbles, 1 interception, 3 pass deflections, and 1 fumble recovery. Williams was once again a star player for Ottawa in 2022, contributing with 92 defensive tackles, two special teams tackles, two sacks, two forced fumbles and one interception. Following the season, with his contract expiring and unable to agree to new terms, Ottawa released Williams on February 11, 2023, allowing him to pursue a contract elsewhere.

=== Montreal Alouettes ===
On February 11, 2023, Williams and the Montreal Alouettes agreed to a contract. In 2023, he played in nine regular season games, starting in six, where he had 34 defensive tackles, three special teams tackles, and one pass knockdown. He became a free agent upon the expiry of his contract on February 13, 2024.

== Personal life ==
Williams was born in Baltimore, Maryland to parents Willinette and Anthony Williams.
