= Rob Katz =

American sports team executive

Personal information
- Born: 1969/1970

Career information
- College: Florida

Career history
- 2005–2007: Hamilton Tiger Cats (interim general manager and COO)

Rob Katz (born 1969 or 1970) is a former interim general manager for the Hamilton Tiger Cats from 2005 to 2006 and the chief operating officer for the Tiger Cats from 2005 to 2007. Before his career with the Tiger Cats, Katz held previous positions in American sports including the Florida Marlins and the Tampa Bay Devil Rays.

== Early life and education ==
Katz spent his childhood in Florida and graduated from the University of Florida in 1992.

== Career ==
During his career, Katz held multiple positions in sports including the Doral Open, Homestead-Miami Speedway and Tampa Bay Devil Rays. From 1992 to 1994, Katz worked in business operations for the Florida Marlins. In 1994, he was employed by the clothing company Nutmeg Mills in the marketing department until 1997. Katz went on to become senior director of merchandise for the Tampa Bay Devil Rays for two years and was selected to be marketing director at the Homestead-Miami Speedway in 1999. Katz also was a co-creator of the marketing company ConVision.

=== Hamilton Tiger Cats ===
On August 10, 2005, Katz was named chief operating officer of the Hamilton Tiger Cats and replaced Ron Lancaster as interim general manager. Katz was previously a special assistant to the Tiger Cats upon his promotion in 2005. A year later, Katz left his position of general manager on August 30, 2006 and was replaced by Marcel Desjardins. Katz's term with the Tiger Cats ended in January 2007 when he resigned from his position of COO. After leaving the Tiger Cats, Katz became a co-owner of a drone company called PrecisionHawk.
