= Nigel Romick =

Canadian gridiron football player (born 1991)

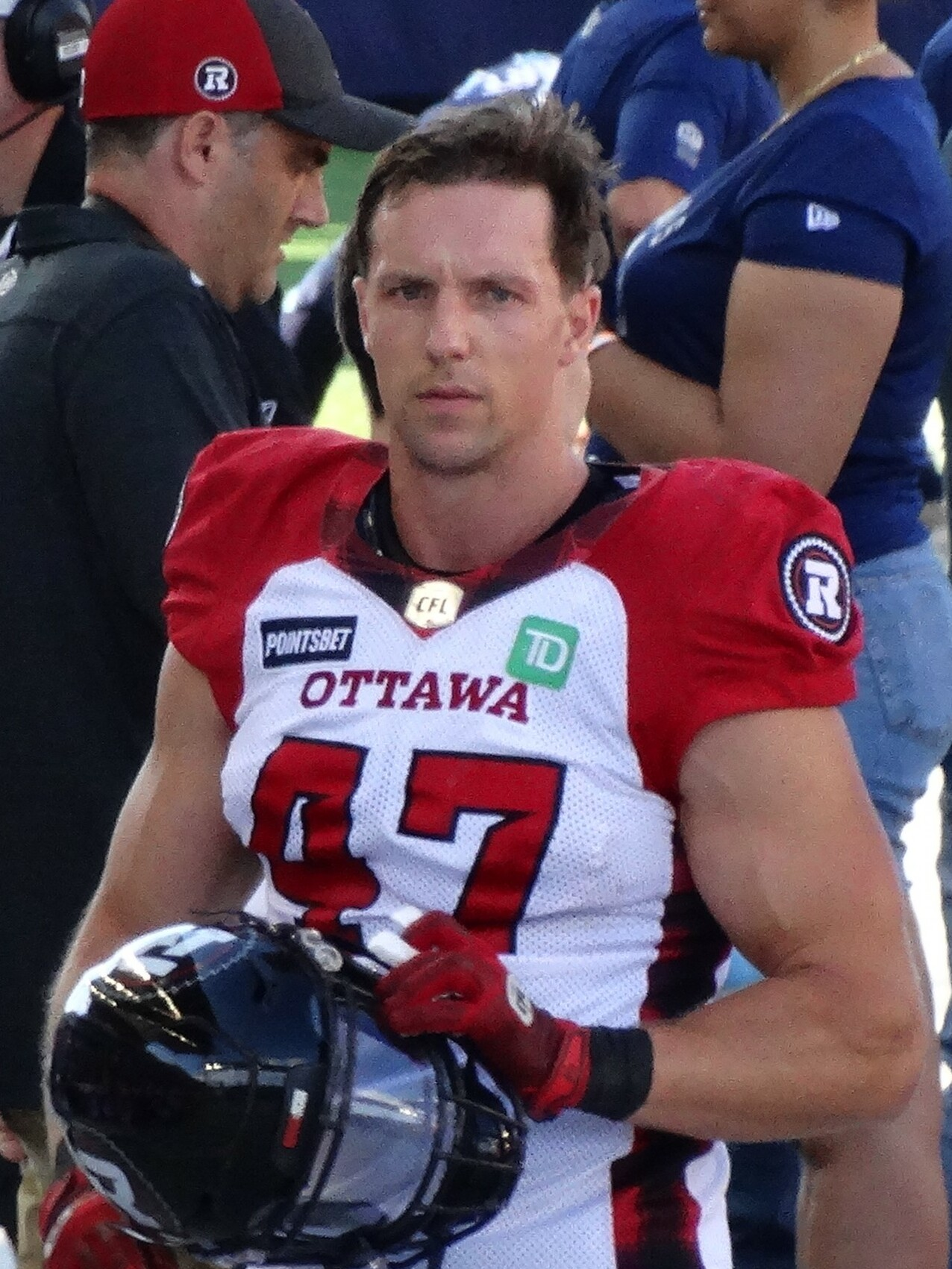
- Romick with the Ottawa Redblacks in 2022

Profile
- Position: Defensive lineman

Personal information
- Born: April 22, 1991 (age 35); Thunder Bay, Ontario, Canada
- Listed height: 6 ft 5 in (1.96 m)
- Listed weight: 248 lb (112 kg)

Career information
- University: Saint Mary's Huskies
- CFL draft: 2014: 3rd round, 23rd overall pick

Career history
- 2014–2025: Ottawa Redblacks

Awards and highlights
- Grey Cup champion (2016)

Career CFL statistics as of 2025
- Games played: 130
- Def. tackles: 17
- ST tackles: 113
- Sacks: 1
- Fumble recoveries: 1
- Stats at CFL.ca

Nigel Romick (born April 22, 1991) is a Canadian professional football defensive lineman. He most recently played for the Ottawa Redblacks of the Canadian Football League (CFL). He is a Grey Cup champion after winning with the Redblacks in 2016. He is also the all-time leader in Ottawa Football Club history in career special teams tackles.

== University career ==
Romick played CIS football with the Saint Mary's Huskies from 2010 to 2013.

== Professional career ==
Following his university career, Romick was selected by the expansion Ottawa Redblacks in the third round, 23rd overall, in the 2014 CFL draft and signed with the team on May 26, 2014. He made the team's active roster following training camp and played in his first professional regular season game on July 3, 2014 against the Winnipeg Blue Bombers. In his rookie year, he played in 11 games where he recorded four special teams tackles.

In 2015, Romick played in all 18 regular season games where he recorded his first two career defensive tackles and also had 17 special teams tackles. He also played in his first playoff game in the team's East Final victory over the Hamilton Tiger-Cats. He then played in his first Grey Cup game, but the Redblacks lost the 103rd Grey Cup to the Edmonton Eskimos. During the 2016 preseason, Romick suffered a ruptured bicep injury and missed the team's first 12 games of the season. He played in two games where he had two special teams tackles, but then suffered a broken thumb in the second game and was out for the rest of the season. While on the injured list, the Redblacks won the 104th Grey Cup game and Romick won the first Grey Cup championship of his career. He re-signed with the Redblacks on December 12, 2016, to a two-year contract extension.

Romick returned healthy in 2017 and played in all 18 regular season games where he had 19 special teams tackles. In 2018, he had a career-high 21 special teams tackles en route to becoming Ottawa's all time leader in special teams tackles. He also played in his second Grey Cup game that year, but the Redblacks lost the 106th Grey Cup to the Calgary Stampeders.

Romick re-signed with the Redblacks to a one-year contract extension on January 15, 2019. The Redblacks struggled in 2019 in a three-win season, but Romick recorded a career-high eight defensive tackles to go along with 17 special teams tackles. He did not play in 2020 due to the cancellation of the 2020 CFL season.

Romick was featured more on defense in 2021 and recorded his first career sack on October 11, 2021, when he brought down Montreal Alouettes quarterback, Vernon Adams. He finished the year having played in 10 regular season games and had three defensive tackles, 12 special teams tackles, and one sack.

In 2022, Romick began the season on the injured list, sitting out the first five games, but returned to play in the next nine where he recorded one defensive tackle and seven special teams tackles. His ninth and last game of the 2022 season, against the Montreal Alouettes in the Thanksgiving Day Classic, was the 100th of his career. In the first game of the 2023 season, on June 10, 2023, also against the Alouettes, Romick recorded his 100th career special teams tackle in his 101st game played. He finished the year having played in 16 games where he had two defensive tackles and eight special teams tackles. He signed a one-year contract extension with the team on January 11, 2024.

Romick played in 12 regular season games in 2024, while sitting out six due to injury, where he recorded six special teams tackles. He also played in the team's East Semi-Final loss to the Toronto Argonauts. After becoming a free agent in the following offseason, Romick re-signed with the Redblacks to a one-year contract. He missed the entire 2025 season due to injury. He became a free agent upon the expiry of his contract on February 10, 2026.

== Personal life ==
Romick and his girlfriend, Melissa Lamb, have one son, Luca, and one daughter, Lola. Romick volunteered as a firefighter in 2020 and as of 2026 is a full time career firefighter for the City of Ottawa.
