= Crestwood Secondary School =

Location
- 1885 Sherbrooke Street West; Peterborough, Ontario, K9J 7B1; Canada; 44.28655°N 78.3814°W

Information
- School type: Public High School
- Founded: 1963
- School board: Kawartha Pine Ridge District School Board
- School number: 903337
- Principal: Peggy Perkins
- Grades: 9 to 12
- Enrollment: 1075 (2001)
- Colours: Red and White
- Team name: Mustangs
- Website: crestwood.kprdsb.ca

Crestwood Secondary School is a high school located at 1885 Sherbrooke Street West in Peterborough, Ontario, Canada. It was established in 1963 and enrolled 1075 students in grades 9 through 12 in 2001. It is a member of the Kawartha Pine Ridge District School Board.

== Campus ==
Crestwood, named by its first principal, Warren W. Watt, opened in 1963 with extensions and the addition of the Learning Information Centre following within a few years. Crestwood sits on 22 acres (89,000 m^{2}) of open land with a backdrop of dense woods of spruce and pine that are characteristic of the Kawartha district. It neighbors James Strath Public School, which is the largest feeder school for Crestwood. It contains a track just short of 400 metres, two baseball fields, a football field that doubles as soccer fields, a tennis court, a shot put area, and a triple jump area.

== School community ==
The community surrounding Crestwood is evenly split between rural and urban, with approximately 61% of students travelling by bus to Crestwood.

Students that attend Crestwood reside in the west end of Peterborough, Ontario as well as Cavan, Springville, Millbrook, North and South Monaghan Townships, Mount Pleasant, Bailieboro, and Fraserville.

== Notable alumni ==
- Brad Sinopoli Canadian football player

== See also ==
- Education in Ontario
- List of secondary schools in Ontario
