= Greg Ellingson =

American football player (born 1988)

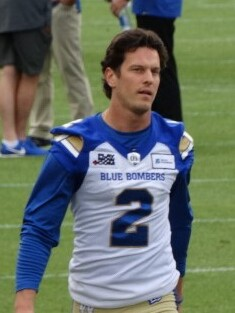
- Ellingson with the Winnipeg Blue Bombers in 2022

No. 82, 2
- Position: Wide receiver

Personal information
- Born: December 30, 1988 (age 37); Tampa, Florida, U.S.
- Listed height: 6 ft 3 in (1.91 m)
- Listed weight: 197 lb (89 kg)

Career information
- High school: Robinson (Tampa)
- College: Florida International
- NFL draft: 2011: undrafted

Career history
- 2011: Jacksonville Jaguars*
- 2012: New Orleans VooDoo
- 2012: Tampa Bay Buccaneers*
- 2013: Tampa Bay Storm
- 2013–2014: Hamilton Tiger-Cats
- 2015–2018: Ottawa Redblacks
- 2019–2021: Edmonton Eskimos / Elks
- 2022: Winnipeg Blue Bombers
- 2023: Montreal Alouettes
- * Offseason or practice squad member only

Awards and highlights
- 2× Grey Cup champion (2016, 2023); CFL All-Star (2017); 3× CFL East All-Star (2016, 2017, 2018); CFL West All-Star (2019)
- Stats at Pro Football Reference
- Stats at CFL.ca

Greg Ellingson (born December 30, 1988) is an American former professional football wide receiver. He played college football at Florida International. He was a member of the Jacksonville Jaguars, New Orleans VooDoo, Tampa Bay Buccaneers, Tampa Bay Storm, Hamilton Tiger-Cats, Ottawa Redblacks, Edmonton Elks, Winnipeg Blue Bombers, and Montreal Alouettes.

== Early life ==
Ellingson attended Thomas Richard Robinson High School in Tampa, Florida. He played college football for the FIU Panthers from 2007 to 2010.

== Professional career ==
=== Jacksonville Jaguars ===
He was signed by the Jacksonville Jaguars as an undrafted free agent in 2011. He was waived from the Jacksonville Jaguars on August 29, 2011.

=== New Orleans Voodoo ===
Ellingson played for the New Orleans Voodoo of the Arena Football League (AFL) in early 2012. In 5 games, Ellingson recorded 33 catches for 475 yards and 8 touchdowns.

=== Tampa Bay Buccaneers ===
He was signed by the Tampa Bay Buccaneers after the release of Tyler Shoemaker on May 22, 2012. He was subsequently released by the Bucs prior to playing in any regular season games.

=== Tampa Bay Storm ===
Remaining in the Tampa Bay area, Ellingson returned to the arena game to start 2013, playing for the AFL's Tampa Bay Storm. In 10 games, Ellingson's 71 catches produced 987 yards and 16 touchdowns, attracting interest from Canadian teams.

=== Hamilton Tiger-Cats ===
Greg Ellingson signed with the Hamilton Tiger-Cats of the Canadian Football League on May 30, 2013, in time for the 2013 CFL season. Ellingson led all receivers in the Tiger-Cats' second preseason game against the Winnipeg Blue Bombers with two catches for 84 yards and a touchdown. His touchdown came on a 58-yard strike from quarterback Henry Burris in the second quarter. The Tiger-Cats won the game 52–0.

Ellingson made his CFL regular season debut on June 28 versus the Toronto Argonauts at the Rogers Centre, and finished second on the team with six catches for 120 yards. The Tiger-Cats lost the game 39–34. Ellingson's first career CFL touchdown came on July 27, 2013, when he caught a 39-yard pass from Burris in the second quarter of a game against the Saskatchewan Roughriders. He went on to lead the Ticats in catches (5) and yards (114) in the 32 – 20 loss. Ellingson played in 12 consecutive games of the CFL season and was having an outstanding rookie campaign. He missed the final 6 games of the regular season with an injury, prior to his injury he was on pace for a 1200-yard season (66.6 yards per game). Ellingson appeared in all 3 of the Ti-Cats post-season games totaling 114 yards on 11 receptions, one of which was for a touchdown. The Tiger-Cats lost in the 101st Grey Cup to the Roughriders.

His second season in the CFL was also cut short due to injury. Ellingson only managed to play in 7 of the 18 regular season games, and also missed out on the Tiger-Cats 2 playoff games. Ellingson managed to rack up 429 receiving yards on 32 catches.

=== Ottawa Redblacks ===
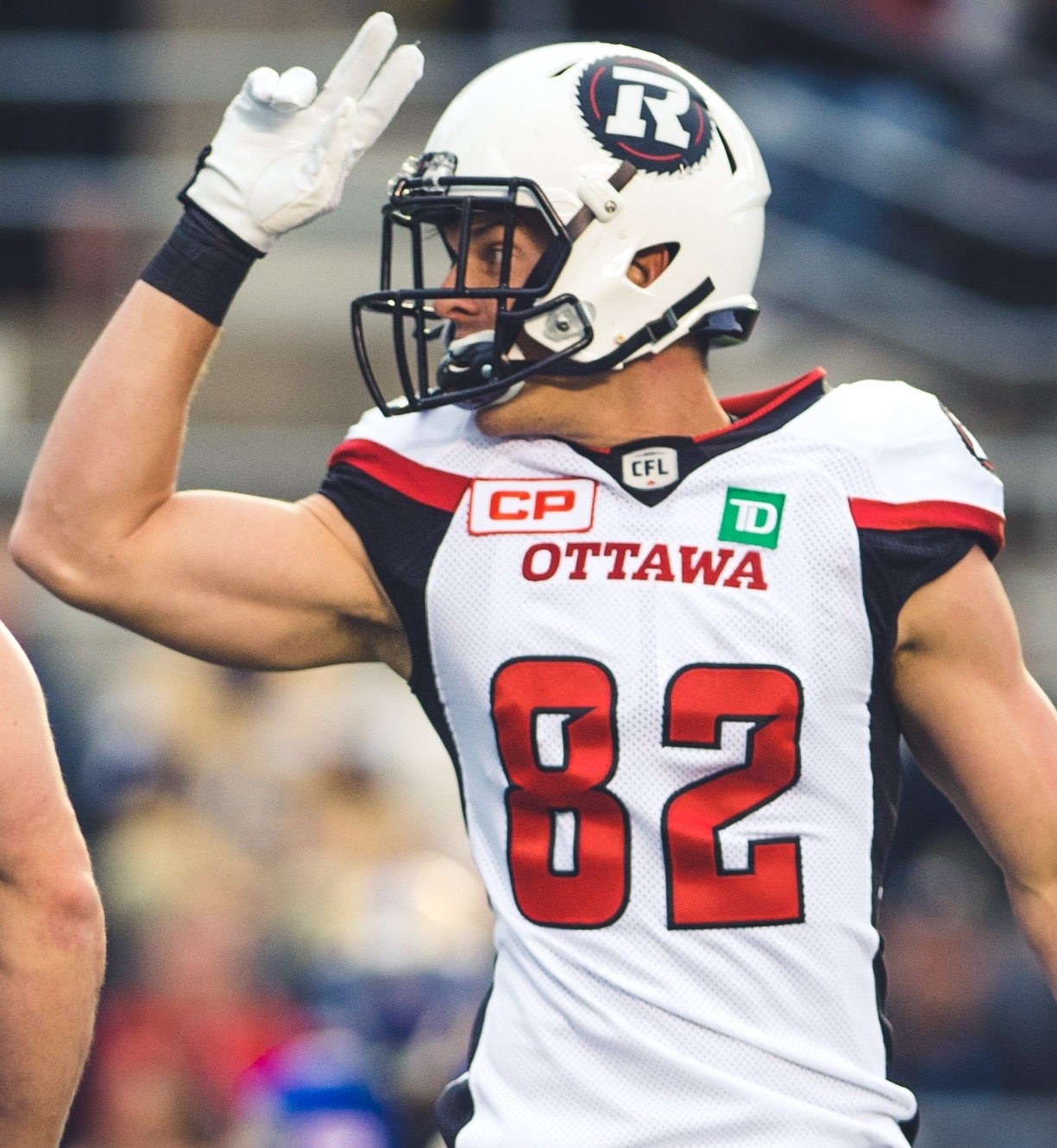
Ellingson with the Redblacks in 2016

Upon entering free agency, Ellingson signed with the Ottawa Redblacks on February 11, 2015. Ellingson had an exceptional 2015 CFL season, setting career highs in every major category. He played in all 18 regular season games, catching 69 passes for 1,071 yards with 9 touchdowns. In the Eastern Final Ellingson had a career day racking up 186 yards on 5 catches with 1 touchdown: His touchdown came with only 1:20 to go in the 4th quarter. On 2nd down and 25 from Ottawa's own 17 yard line, Burris flung the ball down the sideline where Ellingson caught the ball, evaded the defensive back, and ran all the way to the endzone for a 93-yard completion. The catch put the RedBlacks into their first ever Grey Cup game. Ellingson had a career season in 2016. Ellingson set personal bests in receptions (76) and yards (1,260) and was named a CFL divisional All-Star for the first time in his career.

As a pending free agent, Ellingson had a workout with the Chicago Bears of the NFL in mid-December 2016. Nevertheless, he agreed to a two-year contract with the Redblacks on February 10, 2017: The deal was reportedly worth $210,000 per season. Greg Ellingson had another strong season in 2017, finishing first in the league in receiving touchdowns with 12, and third in the league with 1,459 receiving yards. His 96 receptions that year was the most all-time by any of the Ottawa CFL clubs. His production was awarded when he was named a CFL All-Star for the first time in his five-year career. Ellingson continued his strong play in 2018, catching 91 passes for 1,086 yards with 5 touchdowns. Following the season, on December 1, 2018, Ellingson was charged with failing to provide a breath sample. The Redblacks subsequently barred Ellingson from participating in team activities until they had time to investigate the matter.

=== Edmonton Eskimos/Elks ===
Ellingson signed with Edmonton during the 2019 free agency period, after Ottawa General Manager Marcel Desjardins failed to contact him until free agency had opened, and tried to offer him less money than the previous season. Edmonton also signed quarterback Trevor Harris and offensive tackle SirVincent Rogers from Ottawa; Harris also had received little word from Desjardins, and had been involved in a contract dispute the previous season. Ellingson continued his chemistry with Harris, recording his 5th consecutive season with at least 1,000 yards receiving, to go along with 5 more scores. Edmonton reached the Eastern Final as a crossover team, but were defeated. Nevertheless, Ellingson was named a divisional All-Star, his first Western Division honours.

Ellingson did not play in 2020 due to the cancellation of the 2020 CFL season and re-signed with Edmonton on January 30, 2021. He played in ten regular season games where he had 47 receptions for 687 yards and one touchdown in 2021. He became a free agent upon the expiry of his contract on February 8, 2022.

=== Winnipeg Blue Bombers ===
On February 8, 2022, it was announced that Ellingson had signed with the Winnipeg Blue Bombers to a one-year contract. He played and started in just eight regular season games as he dealt with injuries throughout the season, but still managed to record 38 receptions for 598 yards and three touchdowns. Ellingson played in both post-season games, including the 109th Grey Cup game, where he had four receptions for 46 yards, but the Blue Bombers lost to the Toronto Argonauts. He became a free agent on February 14, 2023.

=== Montreal Alouettes ===
On February 15, 2023, it was announced that Ellingson had signed a one-year contract with the Montreal Alouettes. He began the season on the six-game injured list due to a knee injury but eventually made his Alouettes debut in the Labour Day Classic against the BC Lions where he recorded one catch for ten yards. However, he again suffered a knee injury and returned to the six-game injured list for the remainder of the regular season. In the post-season, he was practicing with the team, but was a healthy scratch for both the East Final and 110th Grey Cup victories. He became a free agent upon the expiry of his contract on February 13, 2024.

== Career statistics ==
=== CFL receiving stats ===
Receiving		Regular season						Postseason
Year	Team	GP	Rec	Yds	Avg	Long	TD	GP	Rec	Yds	Avg	Long	TD
2013	HAM	12	52	800	15.4	39	6	3	11	114	10.4	23	1
2014	HAM	9	32	429	13.4	39	0	Did not play
2015	OTT	18	69	1,061	15.4	48	9	2	7	211	30.1	93	1
2016	OTT	17	76	1,260	16.6	77	4	2	8	111	13.9	26	1
2017	OTT	18	96	1,459	15.2	80	12	1	4	52	13.0	19	0
2018	OTT	17	91	1,086	11.9	56	5	2	12	202	16.8	50	1
2019	EDM	16	86	1,170	13.6	54	5	2	15	198	13.2	24	0
2021	EDM	10	47	687	14.6	52	1	Did not play
2022	WPG	8	38	598	15.7	46	3	2	4	46	11.5	24	0
2023	MTL	1	1	10	10.0	10	0	Did not play
CFL totals		126	588	8,560	14.6	80	45	14	61	934	15.3	93	4

=== AFL receiving stats ===
Year	Team	GP	Receiving			
Year	Team	GP	Rec	Yds	Avg	TD
2012	NO	5	33	475	14.4	8
2013	TB	10	71	987	13.9	16
Total		15	104	1,462	14.0	24
