= Rod Woodward =

Canadian gridiron football player (1944–2016)

Profile
- Position: Defensive back

Personal information
- Born: September 22, 1944; Vancouver, British Columbia, Canada
- Died: September 27, 2016 (aged 72); White Rock, British Columbia, Canada
- Listed height: 6 ft 1 in (1.85 m)
- Listed weight: 200 lb (91 kg)

Career information
- College: Idaho

Career history
- 1967–1969: Montreal Alouettes
- 1970–1976: Ottawa Rough Riders
- 1977: Calgary Stampeders
- 1978: Hamilton Tiger-Cats

Awards and highlights
- 2× Grey Cup champion (1973, 1976); CFL All-Star (1975); 3× CFL East All-Star (1972, 1974, 1975)

Rodney William Woodward (September 22, 1944 – September 27, 2016) was a defensive back in the Canadian Football League for twelve years. Woodward won the Grey Cup as a member of the Ottawa Rough Riders in 1973 and 1976. In 2009 he was sentenced to jail for "stealing $185,000 from two elderly clients to pay gambling debts" but his wife believes that this may have been a consequence of injuries he suffered during his football career. He died in 2016 after a fall, having experienced the effects of dementia in his later years.

== Head coaching record ==
Year	Team	Overall	Conference	Standing	Bowl/playoffs
Simon Fraser Clan (NAIA Division II independent) (1980–1982)
1980	Simon Fraser	5–4			
1981	Simon Fraser	3–7			
1982	Simon Fraser	2–8			
Simon Fraser:		10–19			
Total:		10–19			
