= Dave Thelen =

American gridiron football player (born 1936)

Profile
- Position: Running back

Personal information
- Born: September 2, 1936 (age 90); East Canton, Ohio, U.S.
- Listed height: 6 ft 0 in (1.83 m)
- Listed weight: 200 lb (91 kg)

Career information
- College: Miami (Ohio)
- NFL draft: 1958: 27th round, 324th overall pick

Career history
- 1958–1964: Ottawa Rough Riders
- 1965–1966: Toronto Argonauts

Awards and highlights
- Grey Cup champion (1960); 6× CFL East All-Star (1959, 1960, 1963–1966)
- Canadian Football Hall of Fame (Class of 1989)

David Thelen (born September 2, 1936) is a former Canadian Football League (CFL) running back for the Ottawa Rough Riders and the Toronto Argonauts. He was inducted into the Canadian Football Hall of Fame in 1989.

Dave Thelen played semi-pro baseball and was drafted by the Cleveland Indians of Major League Baseball and by the Cleveland Browns of the National Football League before joining the Ottawa Rough Riders of the Canadian Football League in 1958.

During his 9-year career, Thelen rushed for 8,463 yards on 1,530 carries and scored 47 touchdowns. His best years were 1959 to 1961, when he rushed for over 1,000 yards for 3 straight years. He was the CFL’s leading rusher in 1960 with 1407 yards (5.7 yards/rush) and the eastern conference leader in 1959 and 1965. In one game in 1960, he carried 33 times for 209 yards against the Toronto Argonauts. That year, he was part of the 48th Grey Cup winning team. In 1965, Thelen was replaced by Bo Scott and traded to the Toronto Argonauts, playing his final two years with them.
