= Al Marcelin =

American gridiron football player (born 1945)

Profile
- Position: Defensive back

Personal information
- Born: April 17, 1945 (age 81); United States
- Listed height: 6 ft 1 in (1.85 m)
- Listed weight: 190 lb (86 kg)

Career information
- College: Parsons
- NFL draft: 1968: 10th round, 269th overall pick

Career history
- 1970–1975: Ottawa Rough Riders

Awards and highlights
- Grey Cup champion (1973)

Allen Jules Marcelin (born April 17, 1945) is a retired Canadian football player who played for the Ottawa Rough Riders. He played college football at Parsons College.
