= Dean Dorsey =

Canadian gridiron football player (born 1957)

Profile
- Position: Kicker

Personal information
- Born: March 13, 1957 (age 69); Toronto, Ontario, Canada
- Listed height: 5 ft 11 in (1.80 m)
- Listed weight: 190 lb (86 kg)

Career information
- High school: Agincourt Collegiate Institute
- University: Toronto

Career history
- 1982: Cincinnati Bengals
- 1982: Toronto Argonauts
- 1984–1990: Ottawa Rough Riders)
- 1988: Green Bay Packers
- 1988: Philadelphia Eagles
- 1991: Edmonton Eskimos

Career CFL statistics
- Field goals: 219/290
- Field goal %: 75.5%
- Longest field goal: 55
- Kickoffs: 492 (Avg: 53.8; Lg: 90)
- Punting: 57 (Avg: 40.5; Lg: 101)
- Stats at Pro Football Reference

Dean Dorsey (born March 13, 1957) is a Canadian former professional football placekicker in the Canadian Football League (CFL) and National Football League (NFL). He played university football at the University of Toronto.

Dorsey took over kicking duties with the Toronto Argonauts with the departure of Zenon Andrusyshyn during the 1982 CFL season, playing seven regular season and two playoff games. He began a long association with Ottawa football in the 1984 CFL season playing through the 1990 CFL season. He has gone on to coach the Ottawa Junior Riders from 1997 to 1998 and was a volunteer coach for the Ottawa Renegades. He was even briefly considered as a replacement kicker for an injured Dan Giancola for the expansion Renegades before they finally signed Lawrence Tynes in September 2002.

Dorsey tried his hand with the NFL when he signed as a free-agent with the Green Bay Packers in 1988, played three regular season games with Green Bay, then three games with Philadelphia Eagles, going 5-for-10 in field goals (34 long) and 12-for-13 in conversion attempts.
