= DeVonte Dedmon =

American gridiron football player (born 1995)

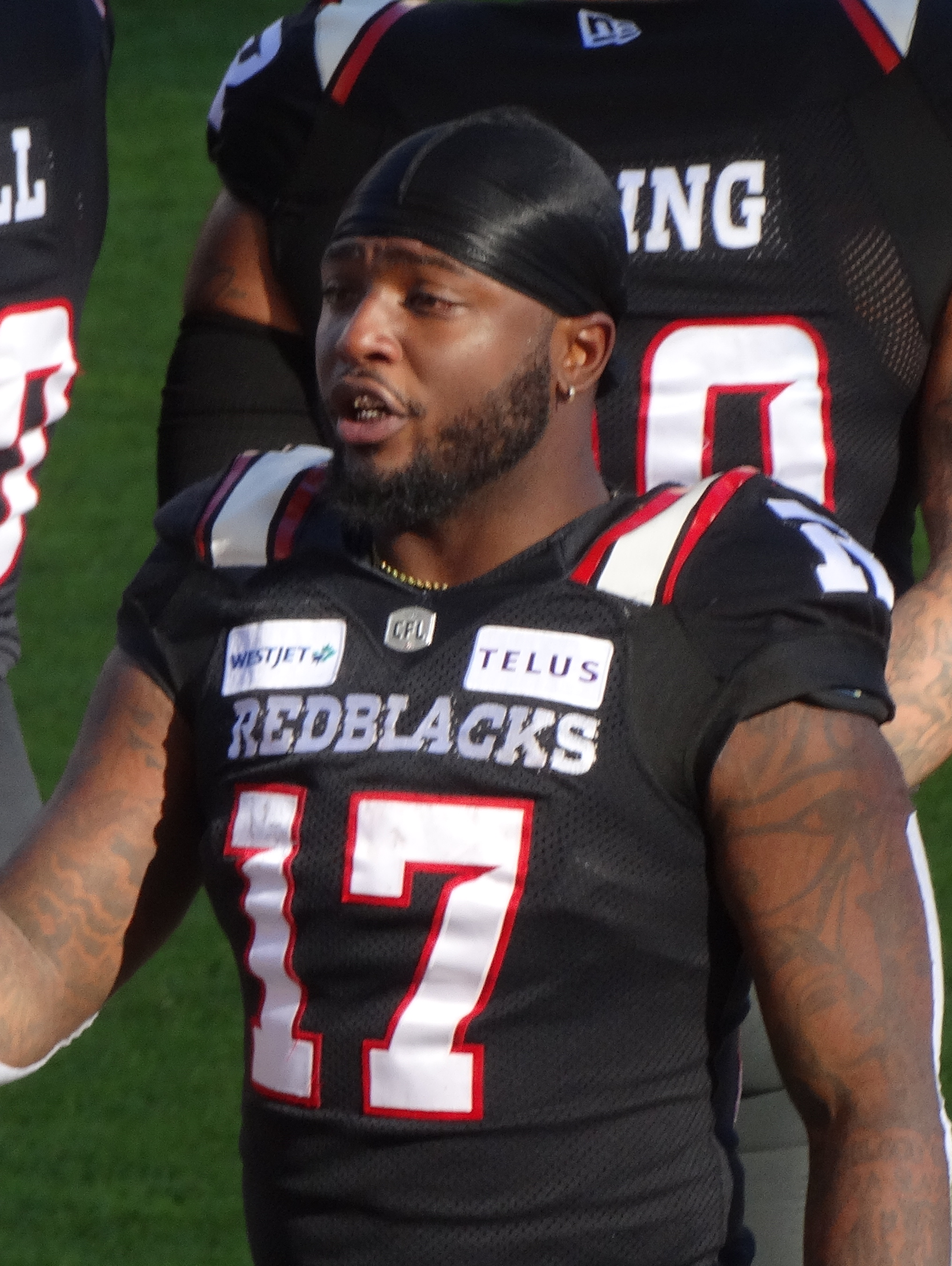
- Dedmon with the Ottawa Redblacks in 2024

Montreal Alouettes
- Positions: Wide receiver, kick returner
- Roster status: Active
- CFL status: American

Personal information
- Born: November 23, 1995 (age 30); Williamsburg, Virginia, U.S.
- Listed height: 5 ft 9 in (1.75 m)
- Listed weight: 212 lb (96 kg)

Career information
- High school: Warhill (Williamsburg, Virginia)
- College: William & Mary
- NFL draft: 2019: undrafted

Career history
- Ottawa Redblacks (2019–2021); Miami Dolphins (2022)*; Ottawa Redblacks (2022–2025); Montreal Alouettes (2026–present)
- * Offseason or practice squad member only

Awards and highlights
- CFL All-Star (2021); CFL East All-Star (2021); John Agro Special Teams Award (2021)
- Stats at Pro Football Reference
- Stats at CFL.ca

DeVonte Dedmon (born November 23, 1995) is an American professional football wide receiver and kick returner for the Montreal Alouettes of the Canadian Football League (CFL).

== College career ==
Dedmon played college football for the William & Mary Tribe from 2014 to 2018.

== Professional career ==
=== Ottawa Redblacks (first stint) ===
On May 22, 2019, it was announced that Dedmon had signed with the Ottawa Redblacks. He played in his first regular season game on July 19, 2019, against the Winnipeg Blue Bombers, where he recorded seven punt returns for 74 yards and five kickoff returns for 117 yards. He scored his first professional touchdown on a 111-yard kickoff return against the Montreal Alouettes on August 2, 2019. In the same game, he also scored with a 95-yard punt return touchdown and set a franchise record with 377 total return yards in the 30–27 overtime win. However, his rookie season was kept short due to injuries and he played in just five regular season games. He did not play in 2020 due to the cancellation of the 2020 CFL season.

On November 2, 2021, it was announced that Dedmon had signed a one-year contract extension with the Redblacks. In the team's next game, on November 6, 2021, Dedmon had a 100-yard kickoff return touchdown and set a CFL record as he recorded his fifth return touchdown in his first 15 career CFL games, surpassing Gizmo Williams' record of 18 games. For the 2021 season, Dedmon played in 11 regular season games and had 11 receptions for 103 yards and ten carries for 68 rushing yards and one touchdown. On special teams, he had 48 punt returns for 737 yards and two touchdowns, 49 kickoff returns for 1,223 yards and one touchdown, and four missed field goal returns for 103 yards. For his strong season, he was named the CFL's Most Outstanding Special Teams Player. He was also named as a league and divisional all-star. He was released on January 26, 2022, so that he could pursue opportunities in the National Football League.

=== Miami Dolphins ===
On January 27, 2022, Dedmon signed a reserve/future contract with the Miami Dolphins of the NFL. He was released on August 16, 2022.

=== Ottawa Redblacks (second stint) ===
On August 20, 2022, it was announced that Dedmon had re-signed with the Redblacks. After joining the team partway through the 2022 season Dedmon only played in six games. He returned 13 punts and eight kickoffs. Dedmon also caught eight passes for 58 yards and carried the ball twice for five yards. On January 3, 2023 Dedmon and the Redblacks agreed to a two-year contract extension. On June 26, 2023, it was announced that Dedmon was out for the remainder of the 2023 season with a shoulder injury.

In 2024, Dedmon again missed time due to injury and played in nine regular season games. He recorded 29 kickoff returns for 799 yards, with a league-leading 27.6-yard average, and one touchdown. He also had 37 punt returns for 424 yards, a missed field goal return for 73 yards, and another 24 yards from scrimmage. In the East Semi-Final, Dedmon had two carries for four yards, two catches for 25 yards, two punt returns for 25 yards, and one kickoff return for 13 yards.

Dedmon played in just eight regular season games in the 2025 season, where he had 22 kickoff returns for 513 yards and 20 punt returns for 232 yards, while missing the rest of the season due to injury. As a pending free agent, he was granted an early release on January 27, 2026.

=== Montreal Alouettes ===
On January 30, 2026, it was announced that Dedmon had signed a one-year contract with the Montreal Alouettes.
