= 2021 CFL season =

Canadian Football League season

- Duration: August 5 – November 20, 2021
- East champions: Hamilton Tiger-Cats
- West champions: Winnipeg Blue Bombers

108th Grey Cup
- Date: December 12, 2021
- Venue: Tim Hortons Field, Hamilton
- Champions: Winnipeg Blue Bombers

CFL seasons
- ← 2020 (cancelled) 2022 →

Locations of the active CFL teams West East

The 2021 CFL season was the 67th season of modern-day Canadian football. Officially, it was the 63rd season of the Canadian Football League. The regular season began on August 5 and ended November 20. Each team played 14 regular season games over 16 weeks. Previously, the season was scheduled to begin on June 10 and end on October 30, with 18 games being played per team over 21 weeks, but this was delayed due to the COVID-19 pandemic in Canada. Hamilton hosted the 108th Grey Cup on December 12, 2021.

== League business ==
=== Resumption of play ===
The 2020 season was postponed on numerous occasions because federal and provincial governments forbade attendance at sporting events in an effort to stop the COVID-19 pandemic in Canada. The league ultimately decided to hold a shortened season in a "bubble" without fans in attendance. However, on August 17, the league called off the season. The federal and provincial governments refused to provide the subsidies needed to cover the expenses necessary for the season to be held. Additionally, public health officials could not guarantee they could approve the league's "bubble" proposal in time to complete the season before Canada's harsh winters set in. At the same time, commissioner Randy Ambrosie guaranteed a return to play in 2021, with fans in attendance at full capacity, without regard to the status of the pandemic by that time.

=== Renaming of the Edmonton team ===
On June 1, 2021, Edmonton's CFL team announced that it adopted a new name, the Edmonton Elks. The team had previously retired its "Edmonton Eskimos" branding on July 21, 2020, and started to temporarily use "Edmonton Football Team" and "EE Football Team", on grounds that the term Eskimo had been considered an offensive term to refer to Inuit.

=== Salary cap ===
According to the new collective bargaining agreement, the 2021 salary cap was scheduled to be $5,350,000 (or an average of $118,888 per active roster spot). That number was subject to change as players would have revenue sharing of 20% from broadcast deals, but could also change due to the COVID-19 pandemic. Individual minimum salaries were set at $65,000 in 2021 for National and American players. Since no 2020 CFL draft pick signed a contract in the cancelled 2020 season, this was the first season with all CFL draft picks subject to a pay scale, with the first overall pick earning approximately $85,000.

=== Schedule ===
The league originally released the season's full schedule on November 20, 2020, which featured a 21-week regular season schedule. The regular season was scheduled to begin on June 10 with a rematch of the 107th Grey Cup with the defending champion Winnipeg Blue Bombers hosting the Hamilton Tiger-Cats. Notably, the schedule featured more intra-divisional games, with BC, Calgary, and Edmonton playing 12 such games, Saskatchewan and Winnipeg playing 11 divisional games, and the East Division teams playing 10 divisional games (an increase of one to two divisional games per team). This was done to reduce cross-country travel. The Toronto Argonauts were scheduled to play a neutral site game on July 19 against the Calgary Stampeders at a location that was supposed to be announced at a later date.

However, due to the ongoing COVID-19 pandemic, the league confirmed on April 21 that the season would be delayed until at least August 5, with a revised schedule released on June 15 (no preseason games were included). This version featured 14 regular season games with even more of a focus on intra-divisional games as the Blue Bombers and Redblacks did not play against each other in the regular season and each team played approximately eight divisional games. As the league anticipated capacity limits to be more lenient in Western Canada, the CFL aligned its schedule to have all East division teams begin their seasons at West division opponents for at least the first two weeks of the season.

If a game postponed due to a COVID-19 outbreak could not have been made up within the regular season schedule, the team(s) affected by the outbreak would be charged with losses by forfeit. If at least 85% of a team's players had received at least one vaccine dose, players received their salary for the unplayed game and the team was credited with a 1–0 win.

=== Potential partnership with the XFL ===
On March 10, the CFL confirmed it was pursuing discussions with the consortium that owns the XFL about some form of partnership, the details of which were not made public. The XFL, which was slated to return in 2022 following its abrupt shutdown and sale in March 2020, paused plans to return pending the results of those discussions. The discussions ended on July 7, with no action taken. The XFL subsequently confirmed it would not resume play until 2023 at the earliest.

=== Global players ===
After first being introduced for the 2019 CFL season, the league featured two active roster spots for players designated as "global" players for each team. Each team also had up to three spots on their practice rosters for global players. Global players were defined as those who did not hold Canadian or American citizenship nor did they qualify as a National player in any other way. This was subject to change after the cancellation of Global Combines in 2020 due to the COVID-19 pandemic.

=== COVID-19 restrictions ===
Some CFL teams enforced limitations on spectator capacity for their games. Even without capacity restrictions, teams still employed enhanced health and safety protocols, such as increased access to sanitization, paperless transactions and digital tickets. With announcements by the Edmonton Elks and Saskatchewan Roughriders on August 30, all CFL teams announced plans to require that spectators present proof that they are vaccinated for COVID-19, either as the result of a voluntary decision, or as the result of provincial public health orders requiring proof of vaccine (British Columbia, Manitoba, and Quebec).

Team	Capacity	Vaccine requirement	Source
BC	Capped at 12,500	Proof of vaccination required beginning September 13 per provincial public health orders.	
Calgary	Full capacity	Proof of full vaccination required beginning September 15 per CSEC policy.	
Edmonton	Full capacity	Proof of full vaccination or negative COVID-19 test required beginning October 15 per team policy.	
Hamilton	Capped at 75% capacity	Proof of full vaccination or negative COVID-19 test required beginning September 6 per team policy.	
Montreal	Capped at 15,000	Proof of vaccination required beginning September 18 per provincial public health orders.	
Ottawa	Capped at 75% capacity	Proof of full vaccination or negative COVID-19 test required beginning September 12 per OSEG policy.	
Saskatchewan	Full capacity	Proof of full vaccination or negative COVID-19 test required beginning September 17 per team policy.	
Toronto	Capped at 75% capacity	Proof of vaccination or negative COVID-19 test required beginning in September per MLSE policy.	
Winnipeg	Full capacity	Proof of full vaccination required per provincial public health orders.	

== Player movement ==
=== Signing moratorium ===
With the 2020 CFL season initially postponed and then ultimately cancelled, the league had placed a moratorium on re-signing players. Teams were able to re-sign players after December 7, 2020, at 12:00 p.m. ET.

=== Free agency ===
The 2021 free agency period began on February 9 at 12:00 p.m. ET. Similar to the previous off-season, pending free agents and teams were able to negotiate offers for one week starting January 31, ending February 7. All formal offers to a player during this time would be sent to both the league and the players union and could not be rescinded.

=== Trade deadline ===
The in-season trade deadline was on October 27 at 5:00 pm ET.

== Regular season ==
=== Standings ===
West Division
Team	GP	W	L	T	Pts	PF	PA	Div	Stk	
Winnipeg Blue Bombers	14	11	3	0	22	351	187	8–1	L2	Details
Saskatchewan Roughriders	14	9	5	0	18	290	285	5–4	L1	Details
Calgary Stampeders	14	8	6	0	16	315	263	6–4	W3	Details
BC Lions	14	5	9	0	10	313	351	2–7	W1	Details
Edmonton Elks	14	3	11	0	6	246	377	2–7	L1	Details

East Division
Team	GP	W	L	T	Pts	PF	PA	Div	Stk	
Toronto Argonauts	14	9	5	0	18	309	318	6–2	L1	Details
Hamilton Tiger-Cats	14	8	6	0	16	312	244	4–4	W1	Details
Montreal Alouettes	14	7	7	0	14	356	295	5–3	L1	Details
Ottawa Redblacks	14	3	11	0	6	224	384	1–7	W1	Details

== Postseason ==
The Grey Cup was played at Tim Hortons Field in Hamilton, Ontario, on December 12. The Winnipeg Blue Bombers won their second consecutive championship, defeating the Hamilton Tiger-Cats in a re-match 33–25, in overtime.

=== Playoff bracket ===
November 28: Division Semi-Finals
East
E2	Hamilton Tiger-Cats	23
E3	Montreal Alouettes	12
West
W2	Saskatchewan Roughriders	33*
W3	Calgary Stampeders	30

December 5: Division Finals
E1	Toronto Argonauts	19
E2	Hamilton Tiger-Cats	27
W1	Winnipeg Blue Bombers	21
W2	Saskatchewan Roughriders	17

December 12: 108th Grey Cup; Tim Hortons Field – Hamilton
E2	Hamilton Tiger-Cats	25
W1	Winnipeg Blue Bombers	33*

*-Team won in Overtime.

== Broadcasting ==
The CFL was broadcast on TSN and RDS across all platforms in Canada as part of their contract. The broadcast rights were reported to have been extended through 2025.

== Award winners ==
=== CFL Top Performers of the Week ===
Week	First	Second	Third	Fans' Choice
One	Abdul Kanneh	Avery Williams	Brady Oliveira	Brady Oliveira
Two	Michael Reilly	Jonathan Woodard	Cody Fajardo	Cody Fajardo
Three	Nick Arbuckle	Cody Fajardo	Greg Ellingson	Nick Arbuckle
Four	Frankie Williams	Jordan Williams	Marc Liegghio	Marc Liegghio
Five	Trevor Harris	Vernon Adams	Brandon Alexander	Brandon Alexander
Six	Stefen Banks	Kamar Jorden	Michael Reilly	Stefen Banks
Seven	DeAundre Alford	Simoni Lawrence	Michael Reilly	DeAundre Alford
Eight	Cody Fajardo	Shaquille Richardson	William Stanback	Cody Fajardo
Nine	Zach Collaros	Caleb Evans	DeVonte Dedmon	Zach Collaros
Ten	Andrew Harris	Dexter McCoil	Ka'Deem Carey	Andrew Harris
Eleven	Rene Paredes	Jake Wieneke	David Ménard	Rene Paredes
Twelve	William Stanback	Eugene Lewis	Monshadrik Hunter	Eugene Lewis
Thirteen	Jeremiah Masoli	A. C. Leonard	Boris Bede	Boris Bede
Fourteen	Cordarro Law	Adam Bighill	A. C. Leonard	Adam Bighill
Fifteen	Duke Williams	Darnell Sankey	Hénoc Muamba	Duke Williams
Sixteen	Nathan Rourke	Johnny Augustine	Davon Coleman	Johnny Augustine

=== CFL Top Performers of the Month ===
Month	First	Second	Third
August	Cody Fajardo	Jonathan Woodard	Michael Reilly
September	Lucky Whitehead	Simoni Lawrence	Michael Reilly
October	David Ménard	Zach Collaros	Jeremiah Masoli
November	A. C. Leonard	Lucky Whitehead	Boris Bede

== 2021 CFL All-Stars ==
=== Offence ===
- QB – Zach Collaros, Winnipeg Blue Bombers
- RB – William Stanback, Montreal Alouettes
- R – Kenny Lawler, Winnipeg Blue Bombers
- R – Eugene Lewis, Montreal Alouettes
- R – Bryan Burnham, BC Lions
- R – Lucky Whitehead, BC Lions
- R – Jake Wieneke, Montreal Alouettes
- OT – Stanley Bryant, Winnipeg Blue Bombers
- OT – Jermarcus Hardrick, Winnipeg Blue Bombers
- OG – Brandon Revenberg, Hamilton Tiger-Cats
- OG – Patrick Neufeld, Winnipeg Blue Bombers
- C – Sean McEwen, Calgary Stampeders

=== Defence ===
- DT – Mike Rose, Calgary Stampeders
- DT – Shawn Oakman, Toronto Argonauts
- DE – Jackson Jeffcoat, Winnipeg Blue Bombers
- DE – Willie Jefferson, Winnipeg Blue Bombers
- LB – Adam Bighill, Winnipeg Blue Bombers
- LB – Simoni Lawrence, Hamilton Tiger-Cats
- CLB – Chris Edwards, Toronto Argonauts
- CB – DeAundre Alford, Winnipeg Blue Bombers
- CB – Jumal Rolle, Hamilton Tiger-Cats
- HB – Cariel Brooks, Hamilton Tiger-Cats
- HB – Deatrick Nichols, Winnipeg Blue Bombers
- S – Brandon Alexander, Winnipeg Blue Bombers

=== Special teams ===
- K – Rene Paredes, Calgary Stampeders
- P – Richie Leone, Ottawa Redblacks
- ST – DeVonte Dedmon, Ottawa Redblacks

== 2021 CFL Western All-Stars ==
=== Offence ===
- QB – Zach Collaros, Winnipeg Blue Bombers
- RB – Ka'Deem Carey, Calgary Stampeders
- R – Kenny Lawler, Winnipeg Blue Bombers
- R – Lucky Whitehead, BC Lions
- R – Bryan Burnham, BC Lions
- R – Kamar Jorden, Calgary Stampeders
- R – Nic Demski, Winnipeg Blue Bombers
- OT – Stanley Bryant, Winnipeg Blue Bombers
- OT – Jermarcus Hardrick, Winnipeg Blue Bombers
- OG – Drew Desjarlais, Winnipeg Blue Bombers
- OG – Patrick Neufeld, Winnipeg Blue Bombers
- C – Sean McEwen, Calgary Stampeders

=== Defence ===
- DT – Micah Johnson, Saskatchewan Roughriders
- DT – Mike Rose, Calgary Stampeders
- DE – Jackson Jeffcoat, Winnipeg Blue Bombers
- DE – Willie Jefferson, Winnipeg Blue Bombers
- LB – Adam Bighill, Winnipeg Blue Bombers
- LB – Darnell Sankey, Calgary Stampeders
- CLB – Alden Darby, Winnipeg Blue Bombers
- CB – DeAundre Alford, Winnipeg Blue Bombers
- CB – Nick Marshall, Saskatchewan Roughriders
- HB – T.J. Lee, BC Lions
- HB – Deatrick Nichols, Winnipeg Blue Bombers
- S – Brandon Alexander, Winnipeg Blue Bombers

=== Special teams ===
- K – Rene Paredes, Calgary Stampeders
- P – Cody Grace, Calgary Stampeders
- ST – Mike Miller, Winnipeg Blue Bombers

== 2021 CFL Eastern All-Stars ==
=== Offence ===
- QB – McLeod Bethel-Thompson, Toronto Argonauts
- RB – William Stanback, Montreal Alouettes
- R – Eugene Lewis, Montreal Alouettes
- R – Jake Wieneke, Montreal Alouettes
- R – Kurleigh Gittens Jr., Toronto Argonauts
- R – Tim White, Hamilton Tiger-Cats
- R – Jaelon Acklin, Hamilton Tiger-Cats
- OT – Landon Rice, Montreal Alouettes
- OT – Chris Van Zeyl, Hamilton Tiger-Cats
- OG – Brandon Revenberg, Hamilton Tiger-Cats
- OG – Kristian Matte, Montreal Alouettes
- C – Peter Nicastro, Toronto Argonauts

=== Defence ===
- DT – Dylan Wynn, Hamilton Tiger-Cats
- DT – Shawn Oakman, Toronto Argonauts
- DE – Ja'Gared Davis, Hamilton Tiger-Cats
- DE – David Ménard, Montreal Alouettes
- LB – Simoni Lawrence, Hamilton Tiger-Cats
- LB – Avery Williams, Ottawa Redblacks
- CLB – Chris Edwards, Toronto Argonauts
- CB – Jumal Rolle, Hamilton Tiger-Cats
- CB – Monshadrik Hunter, Montreal Alouettes
- HB – Cariel Brooks, Hamilton Tiger-Cats
- HB – Shaquille Richardson, Toronto Argonauts
- S – Tunde Adeleke, Hamilton Tiger-Cats

=== Special teams ===
- K – Boris Bede, Toronto Argonauts
- P – Richie Leone, Ottawa Redblacks
- ST – DeVonte Dedmon, Ottawa Redblacks

== 2021 CFL awards ==
- CFL's Most Outstanding Player Award – Zach Collaros (QB), Winnipeg Blue Bombers
- CFL's Most Outstanding Canadian Award – Bo Lokombo (LB), BC Lions
- CFL's Most Outstanding Defensive Player Award – Adam Bighill (LB), Winnipeg Blue Bombers
- CFL's Most Outstanding Offensive Lineman Award – Stanley Bryant, (OL), Winnipeg Blue Bombers
- CFL's Most Outstanding Rookie Award – Jordan Williams (LB), BC Lions
- John Agro Special Teams Award – DeVonte Dedmon (KR), Ottawa Redblacks
- Tom Pate Memorial Award – Mike Daly (DB), Hamilton Tiger-Cats
- Jake Gaudaur Veterans' Trophy – Chris Van Zeyl (OL), Hamilton Tiger-Cats
- Annis Stukus Trophy – Mike O'Shea, Winnipeg Blue Bombers
- Commissioner's Award – Nurse Sara May, Hamilton-area nurse to honour her work during COVID-19 pandemic
- Hugh Campbell Distinguished Leadership Award – Doctors McCormack and Naidu, CFL Chief Medical Officers
- Jane Mawby Tribute Award - Carol Longmuir, director of finance and administration, BC Lions
