= 2018 Ottawa Redblacks season =

Canadian football team season

- General manager: Marcel Desjardins
- Head coach: Rick Campbell
- Home stadium: TD Place Stadium

Results
- Record: 11–7
- Division place: 1st, East
- Playoffs: Lost Grey Cup
- Team MOP: Trevor Harris
- Team MOC: Brad Sinopoli
- Team MOR: Lewis Ward

Uniform

The 2018 Ottawa Redblacks season was the fifth season for the team in the Canadian Football League (CFL). The Redblacks improved upon their 8–9–1 record from 2017, winning their ninth game against the Hamilton Tiger-Cats in an October 19 game, and finished with an 11–7 record. The team clinched a playoff berth and home playoff game for the fourth season in a row following the Toronto Argonauts' week 17 loss on October 6, 2018. After defeating the Tiger-Cats in the East Final, the Redblacks played in their third Grey Cup championship in four years, but lost to the Calgary Stampeders in the 106th Grey Cup game. This was the fifth season with Marcel Desjardins as general manager and Rick Campbell as head coach.

== Off-season ==
=== Open Tryout Sessions ===
On February 15, 2018, the Redblacks announced they would be holding open tryouts across North America during the spring. The dates and locations are listed in the table below:

| Location | Venue | Date |
|---|---|---|
| Indianapolis, Indiana | Decatur Central High School | April 14 |
| Durham, North Carolina | North Carolina Central University | April 15 |
| Houston, Texas | Houston Baptist University - Husky Stadium | May 5 |
| Seattle, Washington | Foster High School Football Stadium | May 6 |
| Atlanta, Georgia | Georgia State University | May 12 |
| Las Vegas, Nevada | Bill "Wildcat" Morris Rebel Park | May 13 |

=== Coaching staff ===
On November 29, 2017 the Redblacks announced they would not bring back four of their assistant coaches (Travis Moore, Bryan Chiu, Derek Oswalt & Ike Charlton) from the previous season. On December 4, 2017 the Redblacks announced the hire of Noel Thorpe as defensive coordinator (Thorpe will double as the defensive backs coach as well). Mark Nelson, who had been the team's defensive coordinator for four seasons, will remain with the club as a linebackers coach. Thorpe had been the defensive coordinator and assistant head coach of the Montreal Alouettes for the previous five seasons.

| Position | 2017 | 2018 |
|---|---|---|
| Head coach | Rick Campbell | |
| Offensive Coordinator | Jaime Elizondo | |
| Defensive Coordinator | Mark Nelson | Noel Thorpe |
| Special Teams Coordinator | Bob Dyce | |
| Running Backs | Beau Walker | |
| Receivers | Travis Moore | Winston October |
| Offensive Line | Bryan Chiu | John McDonell |
| Defensive Line | Leroy Blugh | |
| Linebackers | Derek Oswalt | Mark Nelson |
| Defensive Backs | Ike Charlton | Noel Thorpe |
| Assistant coach | Moton Hopkins | |
| Offensive Assistant | Patrick Bourgon | |

=== Free-Agency ===
The 2018 CFL free agency period officially opened at 12:00pm EST on February 13, 2018. Key transactions are listed below:

==== Retained ====
| Date | Player name | Position | Ref. |
|---|---|---|---|
| November 30, 2017 | Brad Sinopoli | WR | |
| December 13, 2017 | Trevor Harris | QB | |
| January 15, 2018 | William Powell | RB | |
| January 24, 2018 | Alex Mateas | OL | |
| February 7, 2018 | Diontae Spencer | WR | |
| February 7, 2018 | Nolan MacMillan | OL | |
| February 12, 2018 | Jonathan Rose | DB | |

==== Additions ====
| Date | Player name | Position | Previous Team | Ref. |
|---|---|---|---|---|
| February 13, 2018 | A.C. Leonard | DL | Saskatchewan Roughriders | |
| February 13, 2018 | Loucheiz Purifoy | DB | BC Lions | |
| February 14, 2018 | Rico Murray | DB/LB | Toronto Argonauts | |
| February 16, 2018 | Kyries Hebert | LB | Montreal Alouettes | |

==== Departed ====
| Date | Player name | Position | New Team | Ref. |
|---|---|---|---|---|
| February 13, 2018 | Zack Evans | DL | Saskatchewan Roughriders | |
| February 20, 2018 | Taylor Reed | LB | Toronto Argonauts | |

==== CFL draft ====
The 2018 CFL draft took place on May 3, 2018. The Redblacks held seven selections in the eight round draft after trading their fifth-round pick to Calgary for Drew Tate and forfeiting their sixth-round pick after selecting Austin Reuland in the 2017 Supplemental Draft. They then acquired another fourth-round pick after trading Jake Ceresna to Edmonton for Odell Willis and then trading Willis to the BC Lions for the draft pick.

| Round | Pick | Player | Position | School | Hometown |
|---|---|---|---|---|---|
| 1 | 4 | Mark Korte | OL | Alberta | Spruce Grove, AB |
| 2 | 13 | Marco Dubois | WR | Laval | Montreal, QC |
| 3 | 22 | Andrew Pickett | OL | Guelph | Kitchener, ON |
| 4 | 29 | Kene Onyeka | DL | Carleton | Brampton, ON |
| 4 | 30 | Mickael Cote | LB | Concordia | Beloeil, QC |
| 7 | 55 | Justin Howell | DB | Carleton | Bradford, ON |
| 8 | 64 | Jacob Czaja | OL | St. Francis Xavier | Sudbury, ON |

== Preseason ==
=== Schedule ===
| Week | Date | Kickoff | Opponent | Results | | TV | Venue | Attendance | Summary |
| Week | Date | Kickoff | Opponent | Score | Record | TV | Venue | Attendance | Summary |
|---|---|---|---|---|---|---|---|---|---|
| A | Bye | | | | | | | | |
| B | Thu, May 31 | 7:30 p.m. EDT | vs. Montreal Alouettes | W 27–7 | 1–0 | TSN/RDS | TD Place Stadium | 20,539 | Recap |
| C | Thu, Jun 7 | 7:30 p.m. EDT | at Toronto Argonauts | W 32–17 | 2–0 | None | Alumni Stadium | 3,921 | Recap |

# Games played with colour uniforms.

== Regular season ==
=== Standings ===
East Division
| Team | GP | W | L | T | Pts | PF | PA | Div | Stk | |
|---|---|---|---|---|---|---|---|---|---|---|
| Ottawa Redblacks | 18 | 11 | 7 | 0 | 22 | 464 | 420 | 6–2 | W3 | Details |
| Hamilton Tiger-Cats | 18 | 8 | 10 | 0 | 16 | 513 | 456 | 4–4 | L3 | Details |
| Montreal Alouettes | 18 | 5 | 13 | 0 | 10 | 345 | 512 | 4–4 | W2 | Details |
| Toronto Argonauts | 18 | 4 | 14 | 0 | 8 | 369 | 560 | 2–6 | L2 | Details |

=== Schedule ===
| Week | Game | Date | Kickoff | Opponent | Results | | TV | Venue | Attendance | Summary |
| Week | Game | Date | Kickoff | Opponent | Score | Record | TV | Venue | Attendance | Summary |
|---|---|---|---|---|---|---|---|---|---|---|
| 1 | Bye | | | | | | | | | |
| 2 | 1 | Thu, June 21 | 7:30 p.m. EDT | Saskatchewan Roughriders | W 40–17 | 1–0 | TSN/RDS | TD Place Stadium | 24,224 | Recap |
| 3 | 2 | Thu, June 28 | 9:00 p.m. EDT | @ Calgary Stampeders | L 14–24 | 1–1 | TSN/RDS2 | McMahon Stadium | 23,454 | Recap |
| 4 | 3 | Fri, July 6 | 7:30 p.m. EDT | @ Montreal Alouettes | W 28–18 | 2–1 | TSN/RDS | Molson Stadium | 16,718 | Recap |
| 5 | 4 | Thu, July 12 | 7:30 p.m. EDT | Calgary Stampeders | L 3–27 | 2–2 | TSN/RDS | TD Place Stadium | 22,103 | Recap |
| 6 | 5 | Fri, July 20 | 7:30 p.m. EDT | BC Lions | W 29–25 | 3–2 | TSN/RDS | TD Place Stadium | 21,319 | Recap |
| 7 | 6 | Sat, July 28 | 4:00 p.m. EDT | @ Hamilton Tiger-Cats | W 21–15 | 4–2 | TSN/ESPN2/RDS2 | Tim Hortons Field | 23,381 | Recap |
| 8 | 7 | Thu, Aug 2 | 7:00 p.m. EDT | @ Toronto Argonauts | L 41–42 | 4–3 | TSN/ESPN2/RDS | BMO Field | 11,857 | Recap |
| 9 | 8 | Sat, Aug 11 | 8:00 p.m. EDT | Montreal Alouettes | W 24–17 | 5–3 | TSN/RDS | TD Place Stadium | 25,161 | Recap |
| 10 | 9 | Fri, Aug 17 | 8:30 p.m. EDT | @ Winnipeg Blue Bombers | W 44–21 | 6–3 | TSN/RDS | Investors Group Field | 27,602 | Recap |
| 11 | Bye | | | | | | | | | |
| 12 | 10 | Fri, Aug 31 | 7:30 p.m. EDT | Montreal Alouettes | L 11–21 | 6–4 | TSN/RDS | TD Place Stadium | 25,132 | Recap |
| 13 | 11 | Fri, Sept 7 | 10:00 p.m. EDT | @ BC Lions | L 14–26 | 6–5 | TSN | BC Place | 17,529 | Recap |
| 14 | 12 | Sat, Sept 15 | 9:30 p.m. EDT | @ Saskatchewan Roughriders | W 30–25 | 7–5 | TSN/RDS | Mosaic Stadium | 33,350 | Recap |
| 15 | 13 | Sat, Sept 22 | 4:00 p.m. EDT | Edmonton Eskimos | W 28–15 | 8–5 | TSN/RDS2 | TD Place Stadium | 24,800 | Recap |
| 16 | Bye | | | | | | | | | |
| 17 | 14 | Fri, Oct 5 | 7:30 p.m. EDT | Winnipeg Blue Bombers | L 32–40 (OT) | 8–6 | TSN | TD Place Stadium | 21,027 | Recap |
| 18 | 15 | Sat, Oct 13 | 5:00 p.m. EDT | @ Edmonton Eskimos | L 16–34 | 8–7 | TSN/RDS2 | Commonwealth Stadium | 27,163 | Recap |
| 19 | 16 | Fri, Oct 19 | 7:00 p.m. EDT | Hamilton Tiger-Cats | W 35–31 | 9–7 | TSN/RDS2 | TD Place Stadium | 23,534 | Recap |
| 20 | 17 | Sat, Oct 27 | 4:00 p.m. EDT | @ Hamilton Tiger-Cats | W 30–13 | 10–7 | TSN/RDS | Tim Hortons Field | 23,329 | Recap |
| 21 | 18 | Fri, Nov 2 | 7:30 p.m. EDT | Toronto Argonauts | W 24–9 | 11–7 | TSN/RDS | TD Place Stadium | 22,185 | Recap |

# Games played with colour uniforms.
# Games played with white uniforms.

== Post-season ==
=== Schedule ===
With their victory over the Hamilton Tiger-Cats, the Ottawa Redblacks clinched their third Grey Cup birth in four years having won the 2016 Championship Game in Toronto. Trevor Harris threw a playoff record six touchdown passes in the game, surpassing a record Anthony Calvillo set in the 2009 East Final against the BC Lions. With the victory, the Redblacks qualified to play the Calgary Stampeders in the 106th Grey Cup, a re-match of the game from two years prior. The Redblacks lost 27-16 in a game that they never had the lead against the heavily favoured Stampeders.

| Game | Date | Kickoff | Opponent | Results | | TV | Venue | Attendance | Summary |
| Game | Date | Kickoff | Opponent | Score | Record | TV | Venue | Attendance | Summary |
|---|---|---|---|---|---|---|---|---|---|
| East Semi-Final | Bye | | | | | | | | |
| East Final | Sun, Nov 18 | 1:00 p.m. EST | Hamilton Tiger-Cats | W 46–27 | 1–0 | TSN/RDS/ESPNews | TD Place Stadium | 24,108 | Recap |
| 106th Grey Cup | Sun, Nov 27 | 6:00 p.m. EST | vs. Calgary Stampeders | L 16–27 | 1–1 | TSN/RDS/ESPN2 | Commonwealth Stadium | 55,819 | Recap |

# Games played with colour uniforms.
# Games played with white uniforms.

== Roster ==
2018 Ottawa Redblacks final roster
| Quarterbacks: 17 Danny Collins; 4 Dominique Davis; 7 Trevor Harris; Running backs: 46 Jean-Christophe Beaulieu; 25 Brendan Gillanders; 23 Mossis Madu; 29 William Powell; Receivers: 89 Marco Dubois; 82 Greg Ellingson; 83 Julian Feoli-Gudino; 84 R. J. Harris; 81 Jacob Scarfone; 88 Brad Sinopoli; 85 Diontae Spencer | Offensive linemen: 64 Evan Johnson G/T; 65 Mark Korte G; 58 Jason Lauzon-Séguin T; 66 Nolan MacMillan G; 56 Alex Mateas C; 67 Josue Matías T; 55 SirVincent Rogers T; Defensive linemen: 98 Avery Ellis DE; 94 Mike Klassen DT; 49 Ettore Lattanzio DT; 90 Andrew Marshall DE; 95 Danny Mason DE; 47 Nigel Romick DE; 44 J. R. Tavai DE; 96 Michael Wakefield DT | Linebackers: 5 Chris Ackie; 31 Kevin Brown; 34 Kyries Hebert; 42 Avery Williams; Defensive backs: 27 Sherrod Baltimore; 20 Jean-Philippe Bolduc; 24 Anthony Cioffi; 2 Randall Evans; 21 Justin Howell; 3 Rico Murray; 6 Antoine Pruneau; 9 Jonathan Rose; 28 Corey Tindal; 33 Dan West | Special teams: 50 Louis-Philippe Bourassa LS; 13 Richie Leone P/K; 10 Lewis Ward K; Practice roster: 41 Dakota Brush FB; 14 Devin Butler DB; 37 Mikaël Charland DB; 87 Seth Coate SB; 30 Tafon Mainsah DB; 32 Greg Morris RB; 18 Noel Thomas WR; 16 Kyle White DB | Injured list: 8 Will Arndt QB; 39 Mickael Côté LB; 45 Anthony Gosselin FB; 63 Jon Gott OL; 99 A.C. Leonard DE; 19 Andrew Lue LB; 43 Jonathan Newsome DE; 91 Don Oramasionwu DT; 57 Andrew Pickett C/G; 15 Dominique Rhymes SB; 92 George Uko DT; 93 Daryl Waud DT; Italics indicate International player |

== Coaching staff ==
Ottawa Redblacks staff
| Front office: Owner – Ottawa Sports and Entertainment Group (OSEG); President – Jeff Hunt; Chief executive officer – Bernie Ashe; General manager – Marcel Desjardins; Assistant general manager – Jeremy Snyder; Director of player personnel – Jean-Marc Edmé; Coordinator of football operations – Joey Swarbrick; Video coordinator – Colin Farquharson; Head coaches: Head coach – Rick Campbell; Offensive coaches: Offensive coordinator – Jaime Elizondo; Offensive line – John McDonell; Receivers – Winston October; Running backs – Beau Walker | Defensive coaches: Defensive coordinator – Noel Thorpe; Defensive line – Leroy Blugh; Linebackers – Mark Nelson; Defensive assistant – Patrick Bourgon; Special teams coaches: Special teams coordinator – Bob Dyce; Strength and conditioning: Strength and conditioning coordinator – Nick Mercuri; → Coaching staff |
