= 106th Grey Cup =

2018 Canadian Football championship game

Ottawa Redblacks	Calgary Stampeders
(11–7)	(13–5)
16	27
Head coach: Rick Campbell	Head coach: Dave Dickenson
	1	2	3	4	Total
Ottawa Redblacks	0	11	3	2	16
Calgary Stampeders	7	14	3	3	27
- Date: November 25, 2018
- Stadium: Commonwealth Stadium
- Location: Edmonton
- Most Valuable Player: Bo Levi Mitchell, QB (Stampeders)
- Most Valuable Canadian: Lemar Durant, WR (Stampeders)
- Favourite: Stampeders by 4
- National anthem: Brett Kissel
- Coin toss: Julie Payette
- Referee: Tom Vallesi
- Halftime show: Alessia Cara
- Attendance: 55,819

Broadcasters
- Network: English: TSN; French: RDS; United States: ESPN2; Mexico: ESPN3; UK/Ireland: BT Sport
- Announcers: Chris Cuthbert (play-by-play); Glen Suitor (analyst); Sara Orlesky (sideline reporter); Matthew Scianitti (sideline reporter)

The 106th Grey Cup (branded as the 106th Grey Cup presented by Shaw for sponsorship reasons) was the Canadian Football League (CFL) championship game for the 2018 season. It was played on November 25, 2018, between the Ottawa Redblacks and the Calgary Stampeders at Commonwealth Stadium in Edmonton, Alberta.

In a rematch of the 104th Grey Cup, the Stampeders won 27–16, claiming their eighth Grey Cup Championship.

== Host city ==
=== Selection process ===
On March 24, 2017, it was reported by several news outlets that the Calgary Stampeders and Edmonton Eskimos were bidding to host the 2018 Grey Cup game. In previous years, the games would be awarded based on regional preference or ownership changes (such as Toronto hosting the 104th Grey Cup four years after hosting their previous one). However, beginning with the 2018 game, the League announced it would conduct a formal bidding process based on the merits of the application to determine a host. Calgary last hosted the Grey Cup in 2009 while Edmonton last hosted in 2010. Both cities had previously hosted the Grey Cup game four times. Edmonton was awarded the 106th Grey Cup on June 5, 2017, and Calgary was awarded the 107th Grey Cup on April 25, 2018.

Despite having a new stadium, and not having hosted the Grey Cup game since 1996, it was reported that the Hamilton Tiger-Cats would not submit a bid for the 106th Grey Cup due to ongoing lawsuits filed against the construction firms that completed the stadium more than a year behind schedule. Tiger-Cats CEO, Scott Mitchell, relayed that the organization was focused on the lawsuits first and foremost, and once those were completed they would focus on hosting a Grey Cup in the near future. Following the resolution of the lawsuits in 2018, the Tiger-Cats announced they would be bidding for the 108th Grey Cup.

=== Grey Cup Festival ===
The Grey Cup Festival took place from November 21 to 25 in downtown Edmonton on Jasper Avenue. In February 2018, it was announced that the planned Festival would be over twice the size of the Festival held for the 98th Grey Cup, which was the last time that Edmonton hosted the event. The increase in the size of the Festival was the result of a new initiative of the CFL to improve the Grey Cup experience and avoid previous situations where hosting teams underbudgeted the Festival. The five-day event included a zipline from Jasper Avenue to Louise McKinney Park, artificial hills for tubing and skiing, as well as Grey Cup traditions like the team parties. A total of fifty unique events and twenty-eight musical acts were scheduled, and the Festival was expected to add over $80 million to the local economy.

On October 11, 2018, it was announced that due to the proximity between the annual Santa's Parade of Lights and the Grey Cup Parade, the two would be combined into a single event. The combined parade was held on November 24.

On November 8, 2018, Maritime Football Ltd. announced a Name-The-Team drive for its proposed CFL team in Halifax, Nova Scotia. During the East Coast Kitchen Party (an annual Grey Cup party put on by fans from Atlantic Canada) held on November 23, it was announced that the proposed team would be known as the Atlantic Schooners—reviving the name of a former conditional franchise that was awarded to Halifax in 1984 but which folded without ever playing a game.

=== Ticket sales ===
On June 6, 2018 the Eskimos announced they had sold 51,000 tickets in only four days; leaving only a little more than 4,800 seats remaining for the championship game. The game officially sold out in the days leading up to the event. Two weeks before the game, it was announced that numerous Festival events, including the CFL Awards Ceremony, CFLPA Legends Luncheon, and the Grey Cup Gala Dinner, were either sold out or close to selling out.

== Background ==
This was the first Grey Cup game to feature eight officials. In the wake of a hit to quarterback Brandon Bridge's helmet that went unpenalized, the league added an eighth official for the Eastern and Western finals. Ben Major was assigned to work as the eighth official in the Grey Cup.

=== Calgary Stampeders ===
The Stampeders finished first in the West Division for a third straight year with a regular season record of 13–5. They became the first team in the league to clinch a playoff spot in week 13 of the regular season with a 38–16 victory over the Toronto Argonauts. The Stampeders narrowly beat out the Saskatchewan Roughriders for first in the West and did not clinch the top spot until defeating the BC Lions in the final game of the season. That victory also prevented the Stampeders from entering the playoffs on a losing streak for the second year in a row.

As the first place team in the West, the Stampeders received a bye in the first round of the playoffs and hosted the Western Final on November 18 against the third place Winnipeg Blue Bombers. The Stampeders won the game 22–14 to become the West Division champions for the third straight year.

=== Ottawa Redblacks ===
The Redblacks placed first in the East Division with an 11–7 record, returning to the playoffs for the fourth straight season. Led by quarterback Trevor Harris, the Redblacks clinched first place with a victory over the Hamilton Tiger-Cats in week 17. During their season, rookie kicker Lewis Ward broke the professional football record for consecutive field goals, surpassing NFL kicker Adam Vinatieri with his 45th consecutive field goal in week 16. Receiver Brad Sinopoli also set a league record for catches by a Canadian, with 116 worth 1,376 yards.

As the first place team in the East, the Redblacks hosted the Hamilton Tiger-Cats in the Eastern Final after the Tiger-Cats defeated the crossover BC Lions in the Semi-Final. The Redblacks handily defeated the Tiger-Cats 46–27 behind Harris throwing for six touchdowns, a CFL playoff record. With the victory, the Redblacks advanced to the Grey Cup for the third time in four years.

=== Head-to-head ===
Calgary and Ottawa met twice in the 2018 regular season, with Calgary winning both games. Their first meeting took place during week 3 in Calgary and saw the Stampeders win 24–14. Two weeks later, the teams met in Ottawa, where the Stampeders routed the Redblacks 27–3. The 106th Grey Cup was the second championship match-up between the two teams, following the 104th Grey Cup which was won by the Redblacks in overtime.

== Game summary ==
Prior to kickoff, Calgary (CGY) won the coin toss and chose to defer to the second half, with Ottawa (OTT) choosing to kick the ball. Due to the freezing temperatures in Edmonton in the days prior to the event, the turf was slippery throughout the game, with Stampeders defensive lineman Ja'Gared Davis commenting that he had never played on a field with as little traction. The two teams opened the first quarter with quarterbacks Bo Levi Mitchell and Trevor Harris exchanging interceptions. Following their interception of Harris' pass, the Stampeders opened the scoring in the last third of the first quarter with a 21-yard touchdown run by running back Don Jackson and a successful conversion by kicker Rene Paredes to put the Stampeders up 7–0. The Stampeders did not relinquish the lead for the rest of the game.

While the Stampeders began the second quarter with possession, the Redblacks scored on their following possession with a field goal by Lewis Ward, making the score 7–3. However, four minutes later the Stampeders responded with another touchdown, this time courtesy a 17-yard pass from Mitchell to Lemar Durant, extending their lead to 14–3. The Redblacks finally scored their first touchdown of the game at the 12:35 mark of the second quarter with a successful pass from Harris to receiver Julian Feoli-Gudino, who caught the 25-yard pass at the 30-yard line and proceeded to run it into the end zone. The Redblacks opted to go for the two-point conversion rather than the kick to make the score 14–11. However, two minutes later Stampeders punt returner Terry Williams scored the final touchdown of the first half following a 97-yard punt return, setting a Grey Cup record for longest punt return. The previous record had stood since the 83rd Grey Cup in 1995 and was set by Chris Wright of the Baltimore Stallions.

In comparison to the first two quarters, the third quarter was a quiet one offensively, with the two teams both managing a successful field goal to make the score 24–14 going into the fourth quarter. The Stampeders kicked another field goal three minutes into the fourth to increase their lead to 27–14. Facing a thirteen-point deficit, the Redblacks make an offensive push and made it to Calgary's seven-yard line before an attempted touchdown pass was knocked down by Stampeders linebacker Jamar Wall, forcing a turnover on downs. Despite conceding a two points to the Redblacks as the result of a safety, the Stampeders managed to hold their opponents scoreless for the remainder of the game, allowing them to win with a final score of 27–16.

With his two successful field goal kicks, Stampeders kicker Rene Paredes became the all-time Grey Cup leader in field goal percentage, having successfully made all 11 of his field goal kicks throughout five career appearances in the Grey Cup. The previous record was 9-for-9 and was held by former Toronto Argonauts kicker Mike Vanderjagt.

=== Scoring summary ===
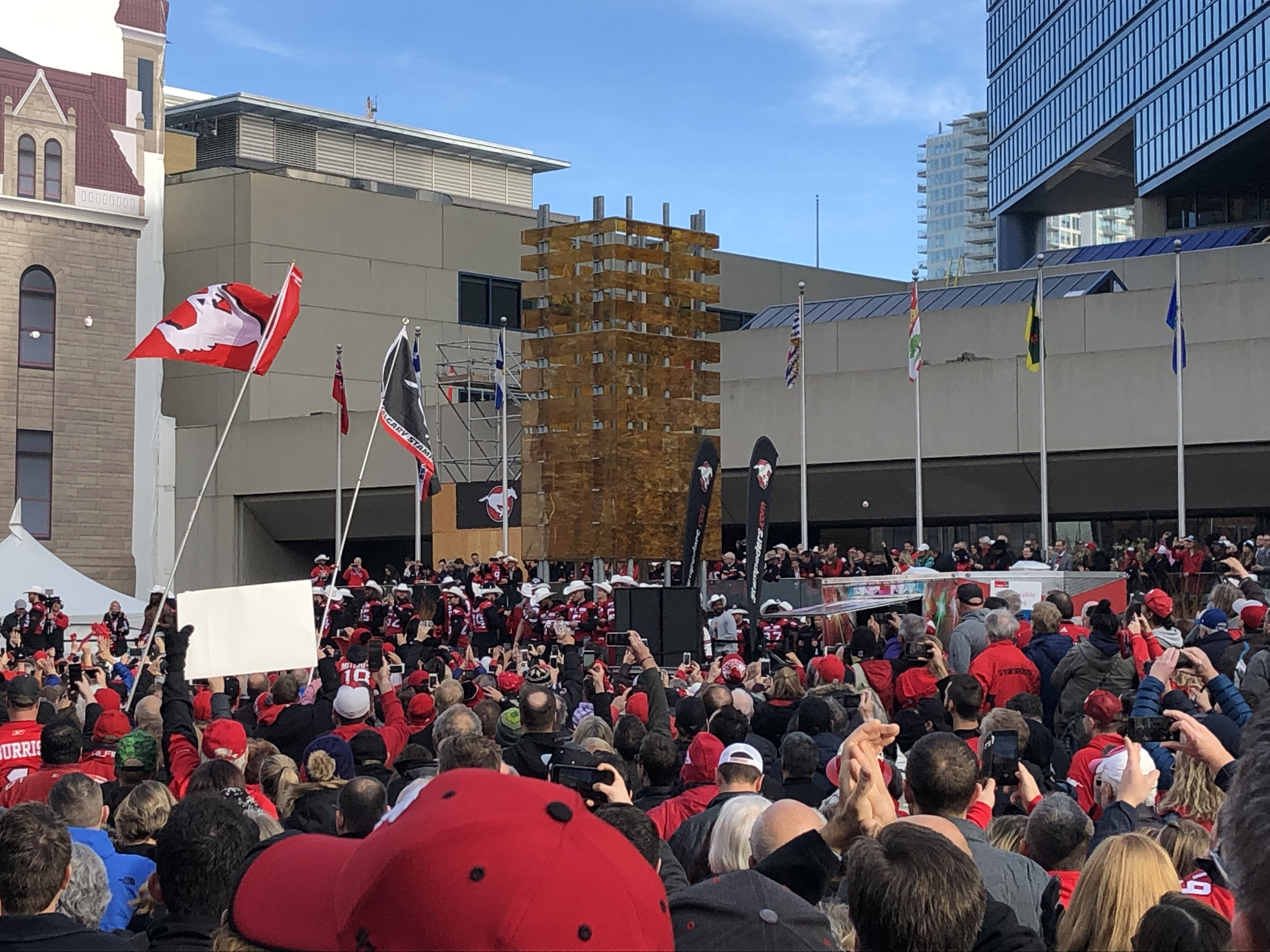
Rally for the 106th Grey Cup, held on 27 November in Calgary, two days after the game.

First quarter

CGY – TD D. Jackson 21 yard pass (Paredes convert) (4:49) 7–0 CGY

Second quarter

OTT – FG Ward 30 yards (12:50) 7–3 CGY
CGY – TD Durant 17 yard pass (Paredes convert) (8:47) 14–3 CGY
OTT – TD Feoli Gudino 55 yard pass (Beaulieu two-point convert) (2:25) 14–11 CGY
CGY – TD T. Williams 97 yard punt return (Paredes convert) (0:20) 21–11 CGY

Third quarter

OTT – FG Ward 41 yards (7:20) 21–14 CGY
CGY – FG Paredes 34 yards (3:53) 24–14 CGY

Fourth quarter

CGY – FG Paredes 29 yards (12:25) 27–14 CGY
OTT – Safety Maver (0:32) 27–16 CGY

=== Individual statistics ===
Sources: CFL 106th Grey Cup Boxscore

Redblacks passing
	CP/AT	Pct	Yards	TD	Int
Trevor Harris	20/38	52.6%	288	1	3
Redblacks rushing
	Car	Yards	Avg	Lg	TD
William Powell	16	94	5.9	–	0
Trevor Harris	1	5	5.0	5	0
Redblacks receiving
	Rec	Yards	Avg	Lg	TD
R. J. Harris	4	66	16.5	–	0
Brad Sinopoli	4	61	15.3	–	0
Greg Ellingson	4	58	14.5	–	0
Julian Feoli-Gudino	1	55	55.0	55	1
Diontae Spencer	3	31	10.3	–	0
Jean-Christophe Beaulieu	2	9	4.5	–	0
William Powell	2	8	4.0	–	0
Redblacks defence
	DT	QS	Int	FR	FF
Kyries Hebert	8	0	0	0	0
J. R. Tavai	6	1	0	0	0
Sherrod Baltimore	4	0	1	0	0
Rico Murray	4	0	0	0	0
Michael Klassen	4	0	0	0	0
Antoine Pruneau	3	0	0	0	0
Jonathan Rose	3	0	1	0	0
Avery Ellis	3	0	0	0	0
Corey Tindal	2	0	0	0	0
Kevin Brown	2	0	0	0	0
Avery Williams	2	0	0	0	0
Ettore Lattanzio	1	0	0	0	0
Anthony Cioffi	1	0	0	0	0
Redblacks placekicking
Player	FM–FA	Lng	Avg	Sng	CM-CA
Lewis Ward	2–3	41	35.5	0	0–0
Redblacks punting
Player	No	GAv	NAv	Sng	Lng
Richie Leone	6	45.2	26.5	0	51
Redblacks punt returns
Player	PR	Yards	Avg	Lg	TD
R.J. Harris	3	31	10.3	15	0
Diontae Spencer	6	21	3.5	10	0
Redblacks kickoff returns
Player	PR	Yards	Avg	Lg	TD
R.J. Harris	3	40	13.3	24	0
Diontae Spencer	1	32	32.0	32	0

Stampeders passing
	CP/AT	Pct	Yards	TD	Int
Bo Levi Mitchell	24/36	66.7%	253	2	2
Stampeders rushing
	Car	Yards	Avg	Lg	TD
Don Jackson	14	53	3.8	–	0
Lemar Durant	1	22	22.0	22	0
Terry Williams	2	16	8.0	–	0
Bo Levi Mitchell	1	7	7.0	7	0
Nick Arbuckle	3	4	1.3	–	0
Bakari Grant	1	3	1.0	3	0
Stampeders receiving
	Rec	Yards	Avg	Lg	TD
Eric Rogers	6	64	10.7	–	0
Chris Matthews	4	59	14.8	–	0
Don Jackson	4	39	9.8	–	1
Juwan Brescacin	5	35	7.0	–	0
Lemar Durant	4	30	7.5	–	1
Julan Lynch	1	26	26.0	26	0
Stampeders defence
	DT	QS	Int	FR	FF
Alex Singleton	8	0	0	0	0
Tre Roberson	5	0	1	0	0
Ja'Gared Davis	4	2	0	0	0
Jamar Wall	4	0	1	0	0
Micah Johnson	3	0	0	0	0
Emanuel Davis	3	0	0	0	0
Brandon Smith	2	0	0	0	0
Cordarro Law	2	0	0	0	0
Jameer Thurman	2	0	0	0	0
Junior Turner	2	1	0	0	0
Ciante Evans	1	0	1	0	0
Adam Berger	1	0	0	0	0
Wynton McManis	0	0	0	1	0
Folarin Orimolade	0	0	0	1	0
Stampeders placekicking
Player	FM–FA	Lng	Avg	Sng	CM-CA
Rene Paredes	2–2	34	31.5	0	3–3
Stampeders punting
Player	No	GAv	NAv	Sng	Lng
Rob Maver	9	43.0	37.2	0	51
Stampeders punt returns
Player	PR	Yards	Avg	Lg	TD
Terry Williams	5	112	22.4	97	1
Stampeders kickoff returns
Player	PR	Yards	Avg	Lg	TD
Terry Williams	2	46	23.0	26	0

== Broadcasting ==
The game was televised in Canada by TSN (English) and RDS (French), and in the United States on ESPN2.

TSN's coverage was produced by Paul Graham, which included a crew of 200 people and utilized 40 cameras including super slow motion cameras for instant replays, and a camera mounted on the referee.

For the first time, a Spanish-language telecast was provided by ESPN Latin America for ESPN3 in Mexico, with Aaron Soriano on play-by-play and the Toronto Argonauts' Frank Beltre on colour. The move came on the heels of a letter of intent between the CFL and Mexico's Liga de Fútbol Americano Profesional, which contained a proposal for partnerships between the two leagues and the possibility of a CFL game played in Mexico as early as 2020.

== Entertainment ==
On June 28, 2018, the CFL announced that The Reklaws would perform prior to the game as part of the SiriusXM Canada Kickoff Show, after their scheduled week 1 halftime performance at Investors Group Field in Winnipeg was cancelled due to inclement weather. Canadian country singer and Alberta native Brett Kissel sang the national anthem which marked the first time the line "in all of us command" was sung at the game.

On September 29, 2018, the CFL announced that Alessia Cara would be the halftime performer.
