= Marco Dubois =

Canadian gridiron football player (born 1995)

- Dubois with the Montreal Alouettes in 2026

Montreal Alouettes
- Positions: Fullback, Wide receiver
- Roster status: Active
- CFL status: National

Personal information
- Born: June 5, 1995 (age 31); LaSalle, Quebec, Canada
- Listed height: 6 ft 4 in (1.93 m)
- Listed weight: 235 lb (107 kg)

Career information
- University: Laval
- CFL draft: 2018: 2nd round, 13th overall pick

Career history
- 2018–2025: Ottawa Redblacks
- 2026–present: Montreal Alouettes
- Stats at CFL.ca

Marco Dubois (born June 5, 1995) is a Canadian professional football fullback for the Montreal Alouettes for the Canadian Football League (CFL).

== University career ==
Dubois played U Sports football for the Laval Rouge et Or from 2014 to 2017.

== Professional career ==
Pre-draft measurables
Height	Weight	40-yard dash	20-yard shuttle	Three-cone drill	Vertical jump	Broad jump	Bench press
6 ft 3 7/8 in (1.93 m)	217 lb (98 kg)	4.62 s	4.56 s	8.05 s	36.5 in (0.93 m)	10 ft 7 in (3.23 m)	18 reps
All values from CFL Combine

=== Ottawa Redblacks ===
Dubois was drafted by the Ottawa Redblacks in the second round with the 13th overall pick in the 2018 CFL draft and signed with the team on May 16, 2018. He made the active roster following training camp and played in his first professional game on June 21, 2018, against the Saskatchewan Roughriders. He later made his first career catch on August 31, 2018 against the Montreal Alouettes. In total, he played in 17 regular season games and recorded three receptions for 11 yards. He also played in both postseason games that year and scored his first touchdown on an 11-yard pass from Trevor Harris in the East Final on November 18, 2018. He also played in his first Grey Cup game that year, but the Redblacks lost to the Calgary Stampeders in the 2018 championship.

In 2019, Dubois played in all 18 regular season games and had four catches for 34 yards. He did not play in 2020 due to the cancellation of the 2020 CFL season and instead re-signed with the Redblacks to a one-year extension on December 17, 2020. In the shortened 2021 season, Dubois played in 13 regular season games where he had two receptions for 29 yards and four special teams tackles.

Dubois played in all 18 regular season games in 2022 where he had four receptions for 70 yards and a career-high nine special teams tackles. In 2023, he had five receptions for 94 yards and scored his first career touchdown.

On May 4, 2026, Dubois was released by the Redblacks.

=== Montreal Alouettes ===
Dubois signed with the Montreal Alouettes on May 6, 2026.
