= Louis-Philippe Bourassa =

Canadian gridiron football player (born 1991)

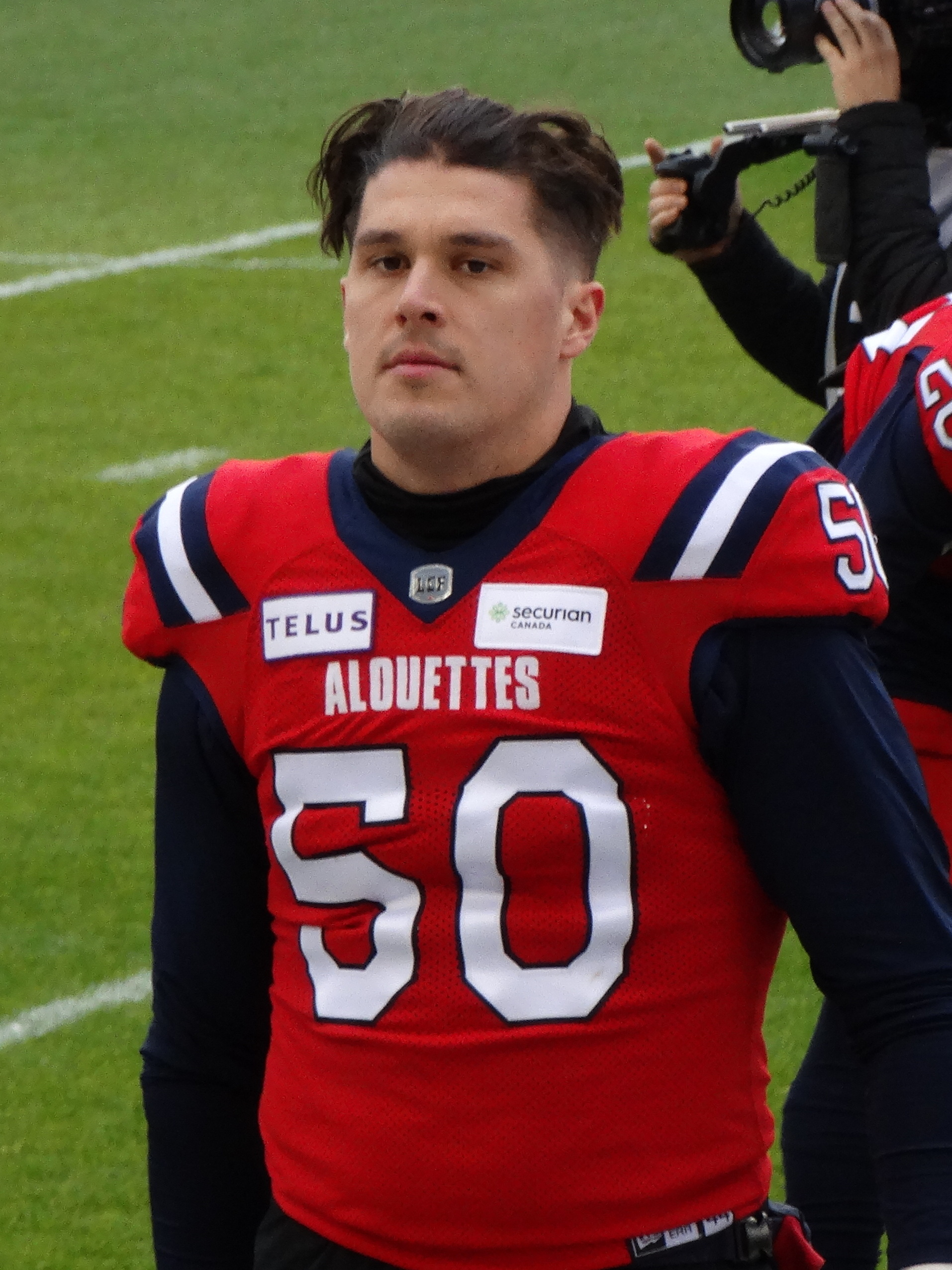
- Bourassa with the Montreal Alouettes in 2023

No. 50 – Montreal Alouettes
- Position: Long snapper
- Roster status: Active
- CFL status: National

Personal information
- Born: November 24, 1991 (age 34); Shawinigan, Quebec, Canada
- Listed height: 6 ft 3 in (1.91 m)
- Listed weight: 245 lb (111 kg)

Career information
- University: Montreal
- CFL draft: 2017: 4th round, 36th overall pick

Career history
- Ottawa Redblacks (2017–2022); Montreal Alouettes (2023–present)

Awards and highlights
- Grey Cup champion (2023); CFL East All-Star (2026); Vanier Cup champion (2014)
- Stats at CFL.ca

Louis-Philippe Bourassa (born November 24, 1991) is a Canadian professional football long snapper for the Montreal Alouettes of the Canadian Football League (CFL).

== Amateur career ==
After playing ice hockey for most of his early life, Bourassa first began playing football at Cégep de Trois-Rivières where he also learned to long snap. He then played U Sports football for the Montreal Carabins from 2014 to 2016. In his first year, he won a Vanier Cup championship after playing in the Carabins' 50th Vanier Cup game victory over the McMaster Marauders in 2014.

== Professional career ==
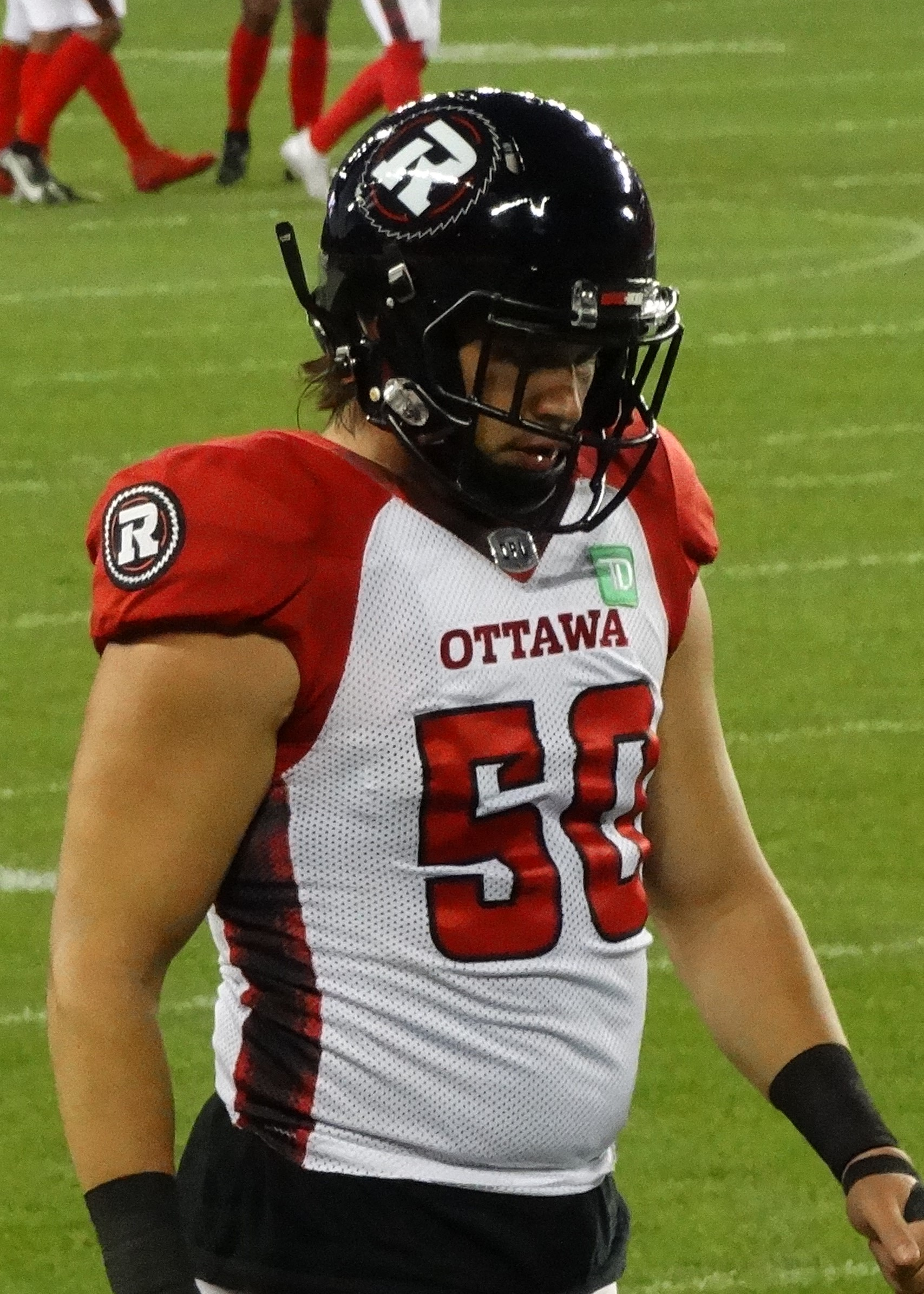
Bourassa with the Ottawa Redblacks in 2021

=== Ottawa Redblacks ===
Bourassa was drafted by the Ottawa Redblacks in the fourth round, 36th overall, in the 2017 CFL draft and signed with the team on May 24, 2017. He played in his first professional game on July 8, 2017, against the Toronto Argonauts, where he had one special teams tackle. He became the team's regular long snapper and played in the remaining 16 regular season games in 2017 and in the East Semi-Final loss to the Saskatchewan Roughriders.

Bourassa played in all 18 regular season games in 2018 and both post-season games that year. He played in his first Grey Cup game, but the Redblacks lost the 106th Grey Cup to the Calgary Stampeders. In 2019, Bourassa played in 16 regular season games and was suspended for two games after testing positive for several banned substances, including ibutamoren and methamphetamine. After the season, he re-signed with the Redblacks to a two-year contract extension on December 27, 2019. He did not play in 2020 due to the cancellation of the 2020 CFL season. He spent two more years with the Redblacks as the team's primary long snapper before becoming a free agent on February 14, 2023.

=== Montreal Alouettes ===
On February 14, 2023, it was announced that Bourassa had signed with the Montreal Alouettes. He played in all 18 regular season games as the team's long snapper in 2023.

== Personal life ==
Bourassa was born in Shawinigan to parents Michel and Agathe.
