= R. J. Harris =

American gridiron football player (born 1992)

R.J. Harris
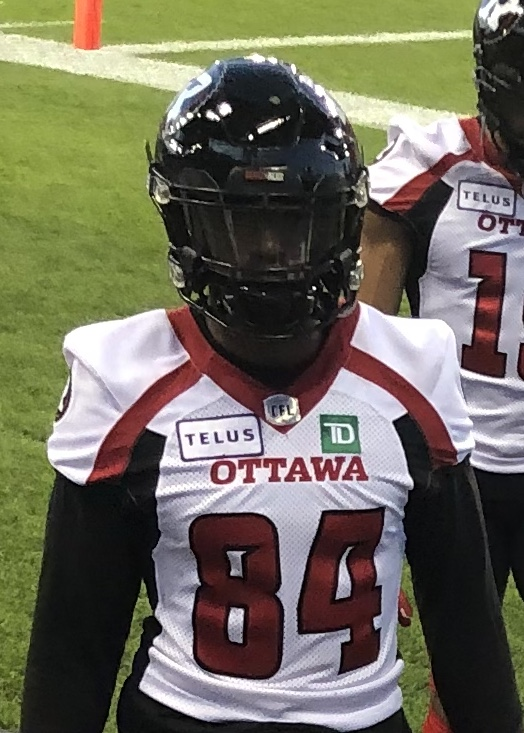
- Harris with the Ottawa Redblacks in 2019

No. 84
- Position: Wide receiver

Personal information
- Born: June 3, 1992 (age 34); Würzburg, Germany
- Listed height: 6 ft 0 in (1.83 m)
- Listed weight: 194 lb (88 kg)

Career information
- High school: Gambrills (MD) Arundel
- College: New Hampshire
- NFL draft: 2015: undrafted

Career history
- New Orleans Saints (2015)*; Atlanta Falcons (2015)*; New Orleans Saints (2016)*; Toronto Argonauts (2017)*; BC Lions (2017)*; Winnipeg Blue Bombers (2017)*; Ottawa Redblacks (2017–2022)
- * Offseason or practice squad member only

Career CFL statistics
- Receptions: 104
- Receiving yards: 1,406
- Receiving touchdowns: 4
- Stats at CFL.ca

Ronnie Harris, Jr. (born June 3, 1992) is an American former professional football wide receiver. He played college football at New Hampshire.

== College career ==
Harris attended the University of New Hampshire where he played for the New Hampshire Wildcats from 2010 to 2014.

== Professional career ==
=== National Football League ===
After going un-drafted in the 2015 NFL draft he signed with the New Orleans Saints of the National Football League (NFL), but was released before the 2015 season began and joined the team's practice roster. After being released from the Saints' practice roster in October 2015, he was signed by the Atlanta Falcons in December to their practice roster where he remained for the 2015 season. During the following off-season, he re-signed with the Saints for the 2016 season, but was again released following the pre-season games.

=== Canadian Football League ===
Harris signed with the Toronto Argonauts on February 1, 2017. He was released following mini camp on May 1, 2017, but was then signed by the BC Lions on May 23, 2017. He played in two pre-season games with the Lions, recording two catches for 47 yards and one touchdown, but was released on June 17, 2017, as part of final training camp cuts. Shortly after, he was signed by the Winnipeg Blue Bombers on June 21, 2017, to their practice roster, but was released again on June 30, 2017. Harris was then signed by the Ottawa Redblacks on July 11, 2017, and spent the season on the practice roster and suspended list.

During the 2018 season, Harris was promoted to the active roster for the Redblacks and played in his first professional football game on July 6, 2018, where he had one catch for 10 yards. He scored his first touchdown on a 14-yard reception from Trevor Harris against the Montreal Alouettes on August 11, 2018. He finished the year having played in 16 regular season games recording 49 receptions for 697 yards and two touchdowns. In 2019, he solidified himself as a starter with the Redblacks and played in 14 regular season games while catching 62 passes for 774 receiving yards and two touchdowns. As a pending free agent in 2020, Harris re-signed with the Redblacks on February 5, 2020, to a one-year contract. After the 2020 CFL season was cancelled, he signed another contract extension with the Redblacks on January 15, 2021. Harris continued to be one of the Redblacks' best receivers during the 2021 season, playing in all 14 regular season games and catching 46 passes for 595 yards. Following the season Harris and Ottawa agreed to a one-year contract extension. R.J. Harris only played in five games for the Redblacks in 2022, catching 17 passes for 175 yards. Harris was released on February 14, 2023. On April 14, 2023, he announced his retirement from professional football.

== Personal life ==
Harris was born in Würzburg, Germany, to Ronnie Sr. and Annette Harris, former members of the military, but grew up in Odenton, Maryland.
