= Kevin Brown (linebacker) =

American gridiron football player (born 1993)

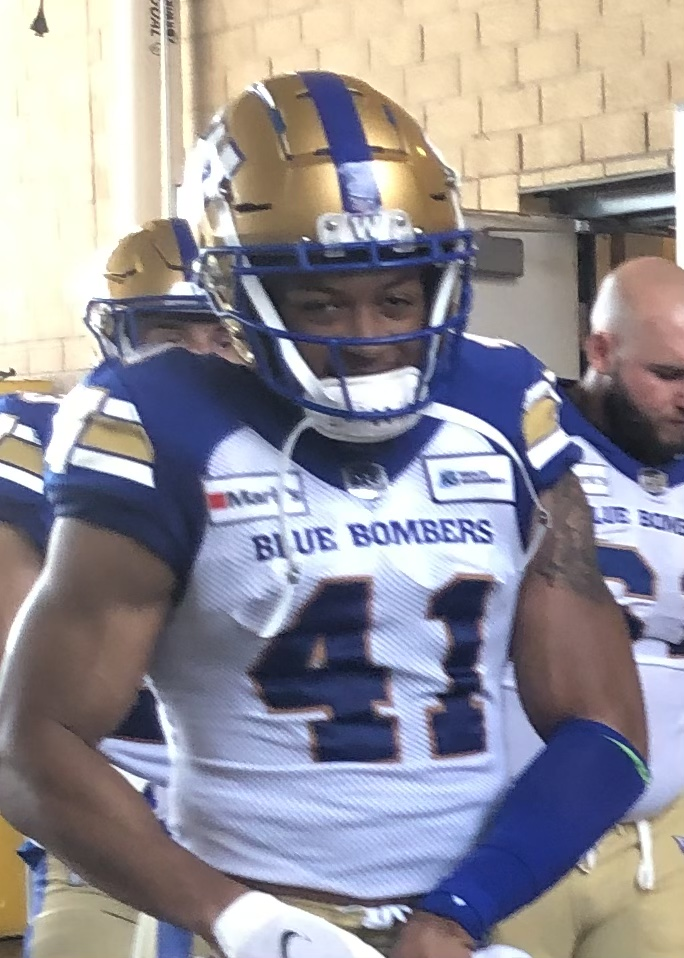
- Brown with the Winnipeg Blue Bombers in 2021

No. 31, 41
- Position: Linebacker

Personal information
- Born: October 18, 1993 (age 33); Indianapolis, Indiana, U.S.
- Listed height: 6 ft 1 in (1.85 m)
- Listed weight: 226 lb (103 kg)

Career information
- High school: Lawrence Central (Indianapolis)
- College: Cincinnati (2012–2015)
- NFL draft: 2016: undrafted

Career history
- 2017–2020: Ottawa Redblacks
- 2021: Edmonton Elks*
- 2021: Winnipeg Blue Bombers
- * Offseason or practice squad member only

Awards and highlights
- Grey Cup champion (2021)
- Stats at CFL.ca

Kevin Brown II (born October 18, 1993) is an American former professional football linebacker who played for the Ottawa Redblacks and Winnipeg Blue Bombers of the Canadian Football League (CFL). He played college football at Cincinnati.

== Early life ==
Brown played high school football in Indianapolis, Indiana for the Lawrence Central Bears from 2010 to 2011.

== College career ==
Brown played college football for the Cincinnati Bearcats from 2012 to 2015.

== Professional career ==
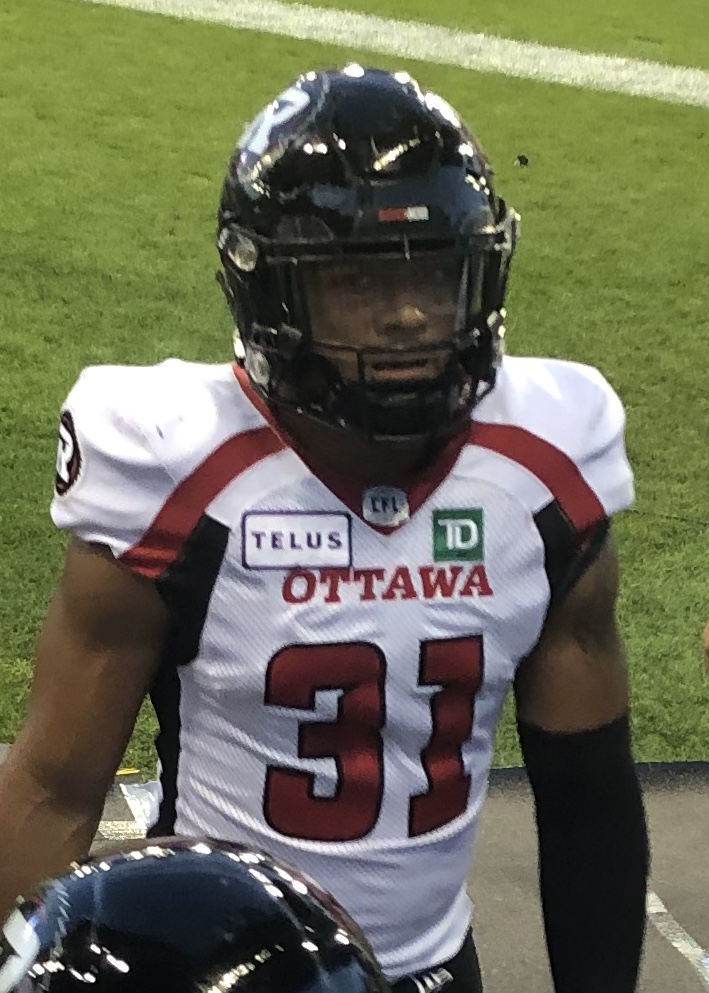
Brown with the Ottawa Redblacks in 2019

=== Ottawa Redblacks ===
Brown signed with the Ottawa Redblacks on December 1, 2016. He played in his first professional game on July 19, 2017, against the Montreal Alouettes where he recorded two special teams tackles. For the 2017 season, he played in 11 regular season games and had 15 defensive tackles, seven special teams tackles, and one sack. In 2018, he became a regular starter and played in 16 regular season games, starting in 15 of them, while recording 55 defensive tackles, 17 special teams tackles, two sacks, and an interception. He also played in his first Grey Cup game, where he had two defensive tackles, but the Redblacks lost the 106th Grey Cup to the Calgary Stampeders. In 2019, the Redblacks struggled to a 3–15 season and Brown played in 15 of those games where he had 42 defensive tackles, 13 special teams tackles, and one interception.

Brown re-signed with the Redblacks to a one-year contract extension on February 11, 2020, but the 2020 CFL season was cancelled and he did not play in 2020. He became a free agent on February 9, 2021.

=== Edmonton Elks ===
On February 9, 2021, Brown signed a one-year contract with the Edmonton Football Team. However, he was released by the newly named Edmonton Elks at the end of training camp on July 26, 2021.

=== Winnipeg Blue Bombers ===
It was announced on August 17, 2021, that Brown had agreed to sign to the practice roster of the Winnipeg Blue Bombers. He was soon elevated to the active roster and played in his first game with the Blue Bombers on August 21, 2021. He played in seven regular season games with the Blue Bombers in 2021 where he had two defensive tackles and eight special teams tackles. He became a free agent upon the expiry of his contract on February 8, 2022.
