= Sherrod Baltimore =

American gridiron football player (born 1992)

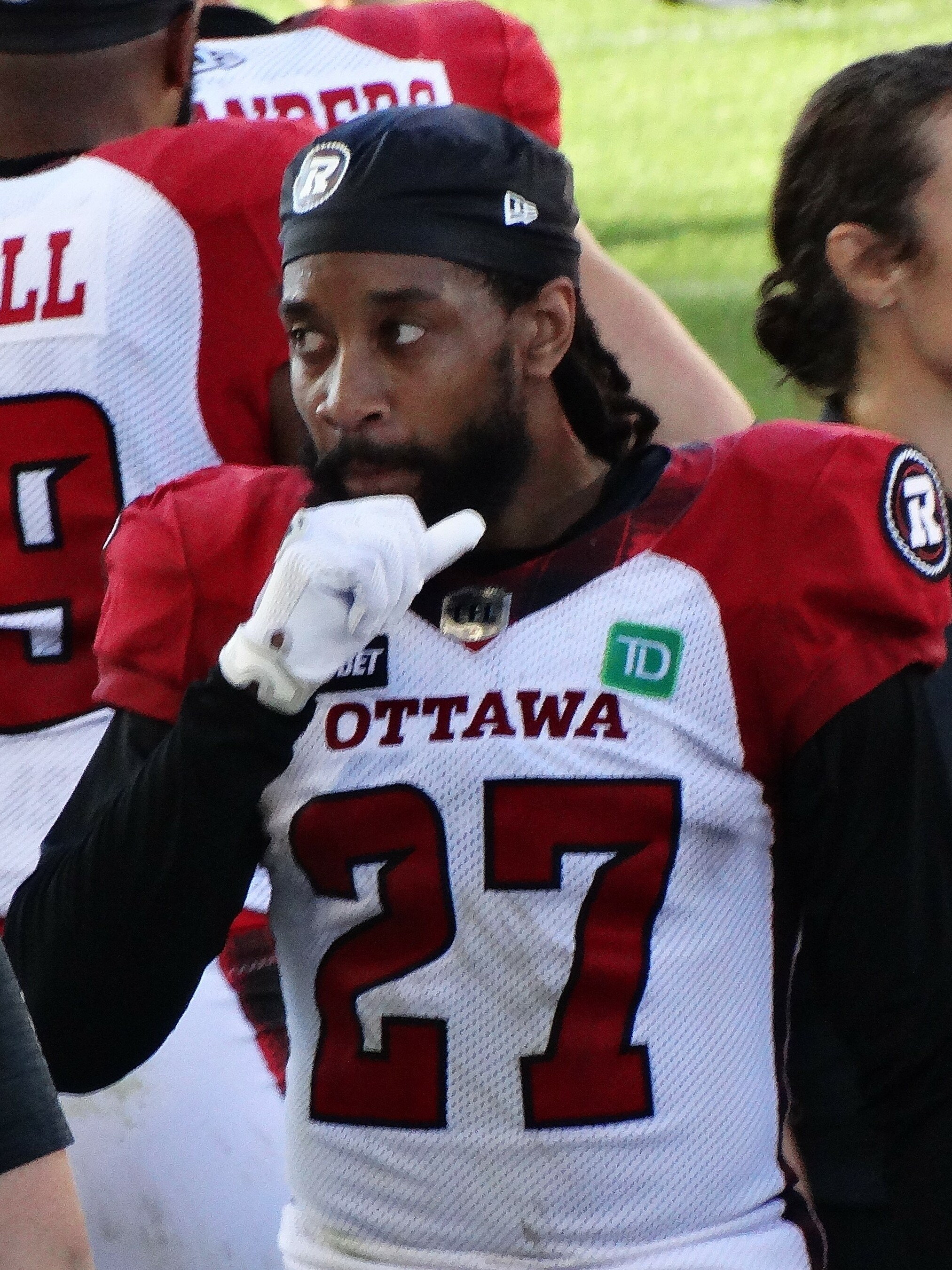
- Baltimore with the Ottawa Redblacks in 2022

Profile
- Position: Defensive back

Personal information
- Born: October 5, 1992 (age 34); Fort Washington, Maryland, U.S.
- Listed height: 5 ft 10 in (1.78 m)
- Listed weight: 175 lb (79 kg)

Career information
- High school: Friendly High School
- College: Maine

Career history
- 2017–2024: Ottawa Redblacks
- Stats at CFL.ca

Sherrod Baltimore (born October 5, 1992) is an American professional football defensive back. He played for the Ottawa Redblacks of the Canadian Football League (CFL). He played college football for the Maine Black Bears.

== Professional career ==
Baltimore signed with the Ottawa Redblacks on April 5, 2017, after being scouted by the Redblacks' director of player personnel, Jean-Marc Edmé. He played in his first game on July 24, 2017, against the Toronto Argonauts where he recorded five defensive tackles. Over the 2017 season, he played and started in 13 regular season games and made 47 defensive tackles and was the team's nominee for the CFL's Most Outstanding Rookie Award. He also played in the team's East Semi-Final playoff loss to the Saskatchewan Roughriders that year.

To begin the 2018 Ottawa Redblacks season, Baltimore lost his starting position and was placed on the team's practice roster, despite his previous season's success. After sitting out four games, he was activated for the July 20, 2018, game against the BC Lions as a backup. Throughout the season, he was promoted to starter and relegated back again to back up, but overall played in 13 regular season games while starting in six. He recorded 15 defensive tackles and two interceptions, including his first career interception on a pass from the Hamilton Tiger-Cats' Jeremiah Masoli on October 19, 2018. He again recorded an interception in the Redblacks' East Final playoff win against the Tiger-Cats and played in his first Grey Cup championship game. Despite a strong outing by Baltimore with four defensive tackles and another interception, the Redblacks fell to the Calgary Stampeders 27–16 in the 106th Grey Cup. On December 21, 2018, it was announced that Baltimore had signed an extension with the Redblacks.

In 2019, Baltimore made the opening day active roster for the first time and played in a career-high 16 regular season games. He had 29 defensive tackles and one forced fumble, but the team struggled to a 3–15 record and failed to qualify for the playoffs. He did not play in 2020 due to the CFL cancelling their 2020 season. On January 11, 2021, it was announced that Baltimore had signed an extension with the Redblacks through the 2021 season.

Baltimore became a free agent upon the expiry of his contract on February 13, 2024. However, he was re-signed at the start of the 2024 season on June 10, 2024. He played in five games and recorded eight defensive tackles before being released on August 4, 2024.

== Personal life ==
Baltimore grew up with his mother, Sharisse Baltimore, and six siblings in the Washington, D.C. area.
