= Jameer Thurman =

American gridiron football player (born 1995)

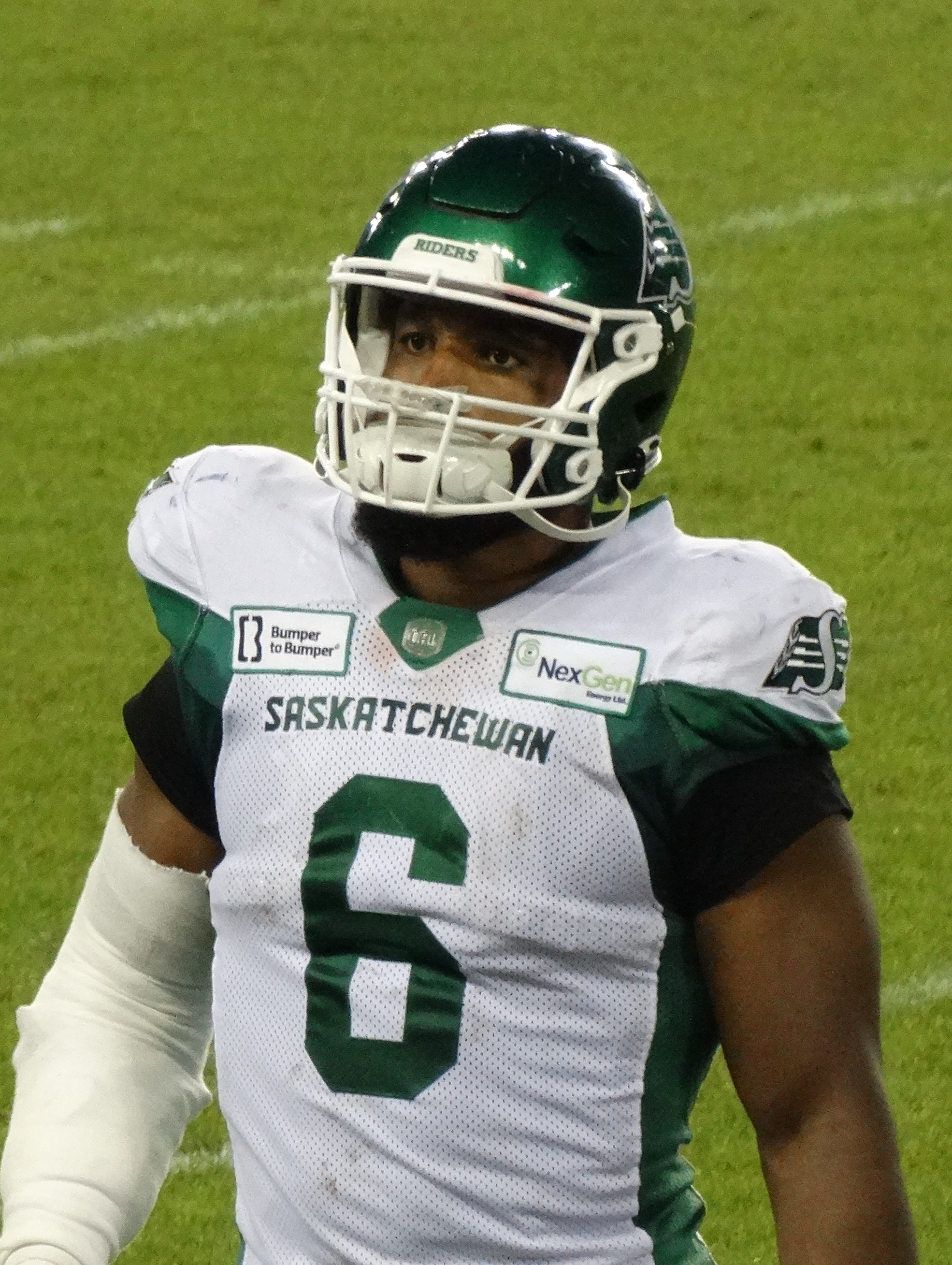
- Thurman with the Saskatchewan Roughriders in 2024

No. 6 – Saskatchewan Roughriders
- Position: Linebacker
- Roster status: Active
- CFL status: American

Personal information
- Born: January 20, 1995 (age 31); Chicago, Illinois, U.S.
- Listed height: 6 ft 0 in (1.83 m)
- Listed weight: 230 lb (104 kg)

Career information
- High school: Proviso West (Hillside, Illinois)
- College: Indiana State
- NFL draft: 2017: undrafted

Career history
- Calgary Stampeders (2017–2018); Chicago Bears (2019)*; DC Defenders (2020); Calgary Stampeders (2021–2022); Hamilton Tiger-Cats (2023); Saskatchewan Roughriders (2024–present)
- * Offseason or practice squad member only

Awards and highlights
- 2× Grey Cup champion (2018, 2025); CFL All-Star (2025); 3× CFL West All-Star (2024, 2025, 2026)

Career CFL statistics as of 2025
- Tackles: 563
- Sacks: 15
- Interceptions: 13
- Forced fumbles: 12
- Stats at CFL.ca
- Stats at Pro Football Reference

Jameer Thurman (born January 20, 1995) is an American professional football linebacker for the Saskatchewan Roughriders of the Canadian Football League (CFL).

== College career ==
Thurman played college football for the Indiana State Sycamores from 2013 to 2016.

== Professional career ==
Pre-draft measurables
Height	Weight	Arm length	Hand span	Wingspan	40-yard dash	10-yard split	20-yard split	20-yard shuttle	Three-cone drill	Vertical jump	Broad jump	Bench press
5 ft 11 5/8 in (1.82 m)	225 lb (102 kg)	31 7/8 in (0.81 m)	9 3/4 in (0.25 m)	6 ft 4 3/4 in (1.95 m)	4.59 s	1.53 s	2.64 s	4.27 s	7.21 s	38.0 in (0.97 m)	10 ft 5 in (3.18 m)	26 reps
All values from Pro Day

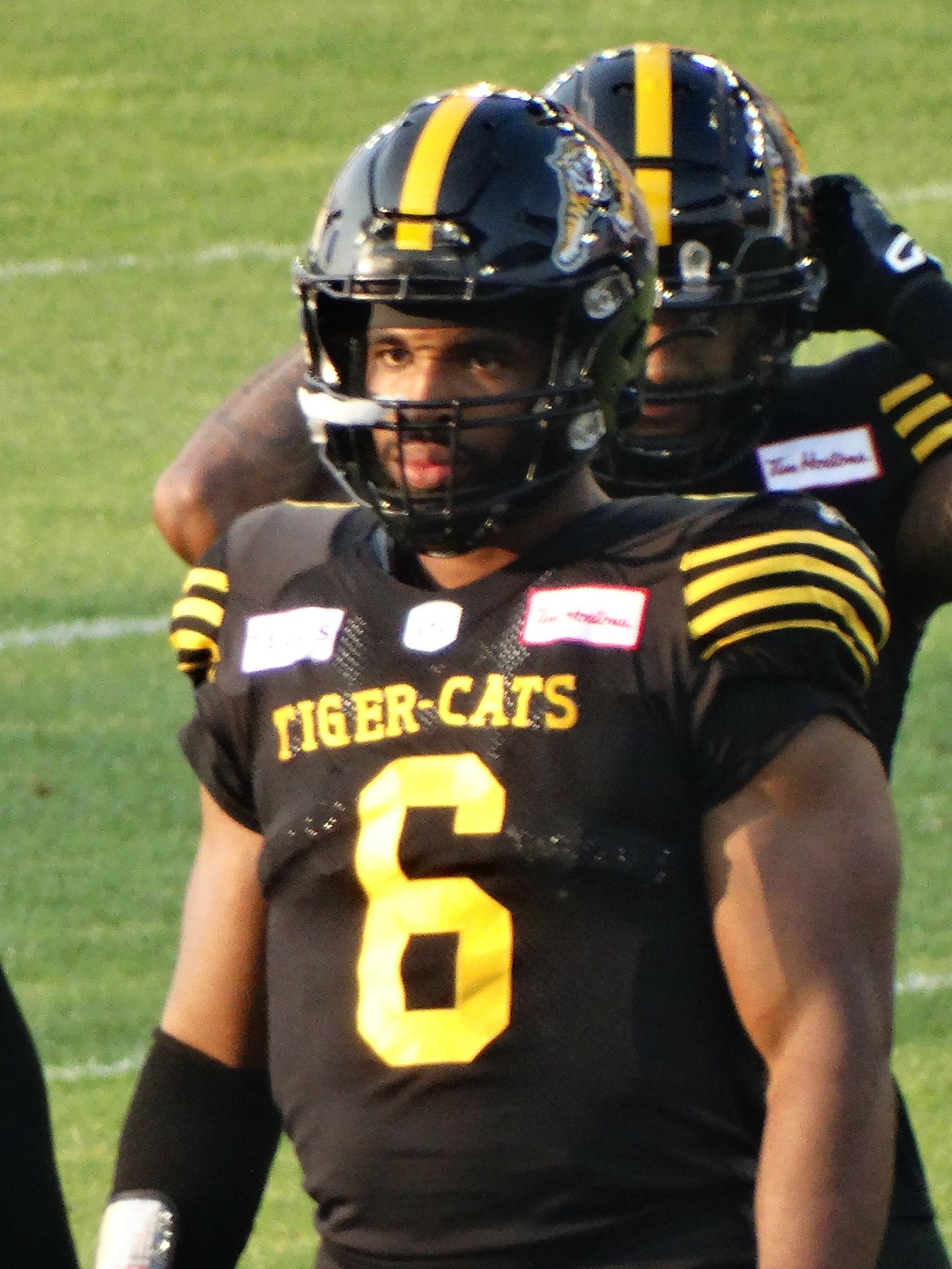
Thurman with the Hamilton Tiger-Cats in 2023

=== Calgary Stampeders (first stint) ===
Thurman spent two seasons with the Calgary Stampeders of the Canadian Football League. Playing in all 18 regular season games during his rookie season in 2017, Thurman recorded 52 tackles, as well as 13 more special teams tackles, a sack, two interceptions, and two forced fumbles. Calgary made it to the 105th Grey Cup, but lost the championship game to the Toronto Argonauts. Thurman recorded 7 tackles during the game, and also sacked Argos quarterback Ricky Ray. The 2018 season again ended with a trip to the Grey Cup; this time it was a victory. Calgary's win in the 106th Grey Cup was the organization's 8th title. In that game, Thurman had two more tackles and a forced fumble, while overall on the year he played in 17 games, upping his tackles to 82 defensive tackles, 16 specials teams tackles, two more sacks, an interception, and a forced fumble.

=== Chicago Bears ===
Thurman signed with the Chicago Bears in January 2019. Thurman managed 16 tackles during the preseason, but did not make the roster, being waived on August 31, 2019.

=== DC Defenders ===
In October 2019, Thurman was selected by the DC Defenders in the 2020 XFL draft. Despite the season ending after 5 games due to the COVID-19 pandemic, Thurman made 28 tackles, an interception, and forced a fumble. Pro Football Focus listed Thurman as one of the highest graded players. He had his contract terminated when the league suspended operations on April 10, 2020.

=== Calgary Stampeders (second stint) ===
On January 19, 2021, it was announced that Thurman had re-signed with the Stampeders. He played for two seasons with the Stampeders and became a free agent upon the expiry of his contract on February 14, 2023.

=== Hamilton Tiger-Cats ===
On February 15, 2023, it was announced that Thurman had signed with the Hamilton Tiger-Cats. He started all 18 regular season games where he recorded a career-highs with 98 defensive tackles and five sacks along with two interceptions and two forced fumbles. He became a free agent upon the expiry of his contract on February 13, 2024.

=== Saskatchewan Roughriders ===
On February 13, 2024, the Saskatchewan Roughriders announced that Thurman had signed a one-year contract with the team.

After a 2025 season where Thurman was named a CFL All-Star for the first time in his career and recorded a career-high 11 tackles in the 112th Grey Cup, Thurman re-signed with the Roughriders on January 12, 2026.
