= Patrick Lavoie =

Canadian football player (born 1987)

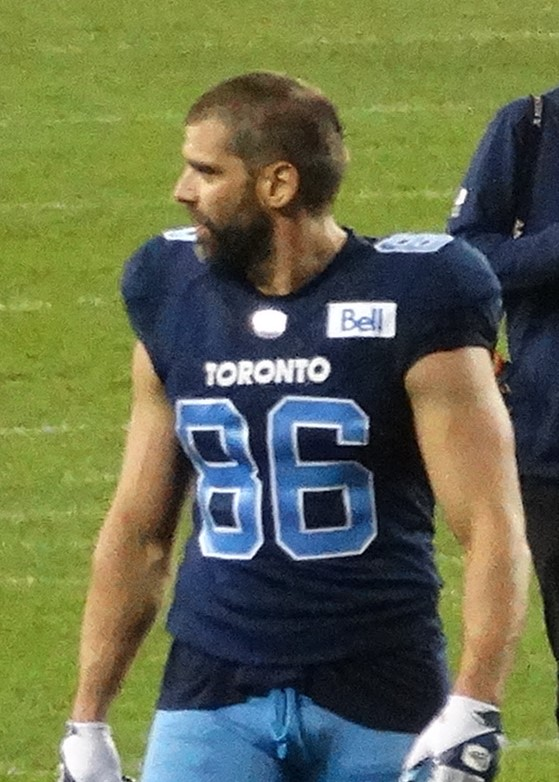
- Lavoie with the Toronto Argonauts in 2021

Profile
- Position: Fullback

Personal information
- Born: October 19, 1987 (age 39); Saint-Flavie, Quebec, Canada
- Listed height: 6 ft 1 in (1.85 m)
- Listed weight: 240 lb (109 kg)

Career information
- University: Laval
- CFL draft: 2012: 2nd round, 11th overall pick
- Expansion draft: 2013: 2nd round

Career history
- 2012–2013: Montreal Alouettes
- 2014–2017: Ottawa Redblacks
- 2018: Montreal Alouettes
- 2018–2020: Saskatchewan Roughriders
- 2021: Toronto Argonauts

Awards and highlights
- 2× Vanier Cup champion (2008, 2010); Grey Cup champion (2016)
- Stats at CFL.ca

Patrick Lavoie (born October 19, 1987) is a Canadian former professional football fullback who played in the Canadian Football League (CFL) for the Montreal Alouettes, Ottawa Redblacks, Saskatchewan Roughriders and Toronto Argonauts. He won the Grey Cup with the Redblacks in 2016. He played CIS football for the Laval Rouge et Or and won Vanier Cup championships in 2008 and 2010.

== Professional career ==
=== Montreal Alouettes (first stint) ===
Lavoie was selected 11th overall by the Montreal Alouettes in the 2012 CFL draft and signed with the team on May 16, 2012 to a two-year contract. He scored his first touchdown on July 6, 2012 against the Winnipeg Blue Bombers. He finished his first season with 33 catches for 307 yards and four touchdowns and was the Alouettes nominee for the CFL's Most Outstanding Rookie Award. After the season, on December 4, 2012, he signed a new, three-year deal that would keep him under contract through 2015. He had a reduced role in 2013 due to injuries as the team also underwent head coaching changes where he only played in 14 games and had six receptions for 46 yards.

=== Ottawa Redblacks ===
On December 16, 2013, Lavoie was selected by the expansion Ottawa Redblacks in the 2013 CFL Expansion Draft. He played in 69 games over four years for the Redblacks as the team's primary fullback, recording 86 catches for 796 yards and three touchdowns. He also had a touchdown catch in each of the Redblacks' Grey Cup appearances in a 2015 loss and a 2016 win. He had signed a contract extension prior to the 2016 CFL season that kept him under contract through the 2018 CFL season.

=== Montreal Alouettes (second stint) ===
On January 30, 2018, Lavoie was traded to the Alouettes in exchange for fellow national fullback J.C. Beaulieu. In his second stint with the Alouettes, he played in 15 games and recorded 13 receptions for 115 yards.

=== Saskatchewan Roughriders ===
On October 10, 2018, Lavoie was traded to the Saskatchewan Roughriders. He played in the last three games of the regular season where he had 10 receptions for 79 yards and also played in the West Semi-Final loss to the Winnipeg Blue Bombers where he had one catch for two yards. He signed a two-year contract extension with the team on December 17, 2018. However, he spent the entire 2019 regular season on the injured list due to a back injury and only played in the 2019 West Final where the Roughriders again lost to the Blue Bombers. With the 2020 CFL season cancelled, he did not play in 2020 and became a free agent in 2021.

=== Toronto Argonauts ===
On September 14, 2021, it was announced that Lavoie had signed with the Toronto Argonauts. He played in four regular season games in 2021 and the East Final that year. He became a free agent upon the expiry of his contract on February 8, 2022.
