= Terry Williams (running back) =

American gridiron football player (born 1992)

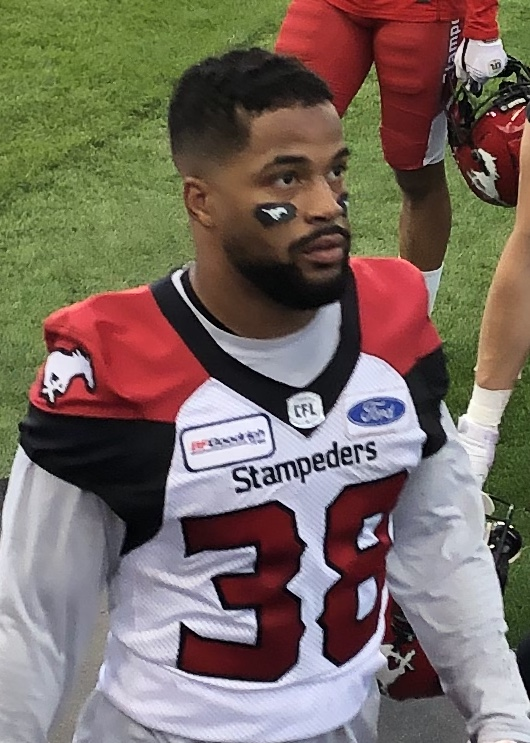
- Williams with the Calgary Stampeders in 2019

No. 38
- Position: Running back

Personal information
- Born: March 11, 1992 (age 34); Morristown, New Jersey, U.S.
- Listed height: 5 ft 9 in (1.75 m)
- Listed weight: 207 lb (94 kg)

Career information
- High school: Cosby (Midlothian, Virginia)
- College: Kutztown
- NFL draft: 2016: undrafted

Career history
- New York Jets (2016)*; Calgary Stampeders (2017–2019); Edmonton Elks (2020–2021)
- * Offseason or practice squad member only

Awards and highlights
- Grey Cup champion (2018)

Career CFL statistics
- Rushing attempts: 117
- Rushing yards: 702
- Rushing touchdowns: 5
- Return touchdowns: 4
- Stats at CFL.ca

Terry Williams (born March 11, 1992) is an American former professional football running back who played in the Canadian Football League (CFL). He played college football for the Kutztown Golden Bears.

== College career ==
Williams played college football for Phoenix College and the Kutztown University of Pennsylvania.

== Professional career ==
Williams signed with the New York Jets in August 2016.

He signed with the Calgary Stampeders in May 2017. On September 29, 2017, Williams made his first career CFL start and ran for 156 yards and three touchdowns; he was named the CFL player of the week.

Williams signed a contract extension with the Edmonton Elks on December 30, 2020. He played in nine games for the Elks in 2021 and was released on December 28, 2021.
