= Diontae Spencer =

American gridiron football player (born 1992)

Profile
- Position: Wide receiver / return specialist

Personal information
- Born: March 19, 1992 (age 34); New Iberia, Louisiana, U.S.
- Listed height: 5 ft 8 in (1.73 m)
- Listed weight: 170 lb (77 kg)

Career information
- High school: Westgate (New Iberia, Louisiana)
- College: McNeese State
- NFL draft: 2014: undrafted

Career history
- St. Louis Rams (2014)*; Toronto Argonauts (2015–2016); Ottawa Redblacks (2017–2018); Pittsburgh Steelers (2019)*; Denver Broncos (2019–2021); New York Jets (2022–2023)*
- * Offseason or practice squad member only

Awards and highlights
- CFL All-Star (2018); CFL East All-Star (2017, 2018)

Career NFL statistics
- Receptions: 10
- Receiving yards: 54
- Return yards: 1,675
- Total touchdowns: 1
- Stats at Pro Football Reference

Career CFL statistics
- Receptions: 259
- Receiving yards: 3,137
- Receiving touchdowns: 19
- Stats at CFL.ca

Diontae Spencer (born March 19, 1992) is an American professional football wide receiver and return specialist. Born in New Iberia, Louisiana, he played college football with the McNeese State Cowboys, where his highest one-game total had been 365 yards, with five touchdowns. He made his professional debut for the Toronto Argonauts (CFL) in 2015. Spencer has also been a member of the St. Louis Rams and Pittsburgh Steelers of the NFL and Ottawa Redblacks of the CFL.

== Professional career ==
After going undrafted in the 2014 NFL draft, Spencer participated in spring mini-camp with the Chicago Bears.

=== St. Louis Rams ===
Spencer signed with the St. Louis Rams on May 27, 2014. Spencer was waived by the team in July.

=== Toronto Argonauts ===
Spencer signed with the Toronto Argonauts in December 2014. Spencer had a productive two seasons in Toronto, catching 107 passes for 1,208 yards with six touchdowns. He also returned 39 punts and 27 kickoff returns.

=== Ottawa Redblacks ===
On the second day of free agency Spencer signed with the Ottawa Redblacks. On October 27, 2017, in a game against the Hamilton Tiger-Cats, Spencer set a CFL single-game record with 496 all-purpose yards: 133 yards receiving, 165 kick-off return yards and 169 punt return yards. Overall, Spencer had an exceptional 2017 campaign with the Redblacks, catching 71 passes for 922 yards with six touchdowns. He also returned 70 punts and 25 kickoffs, and was named a CFL-East All-Star as a returner. On January 31, 2018 Spencer had a workout with the NFL's Baltimore Ravens. Nevertheless, less than one week before becoming a free agent Spencer and the Redblacks agreed on a contract extension on February 7, 2018. Despite recording his first 1,000 yard season in 2018, Spencer did not make the CFL-East All-Star list as a receiver, but did make it as a returner for the 11–7 Redblacks, who finished the year at the top of the division. After advancing to the CFL championship game, Spencer had a costly fumble on a return, and the Redblacks lost the 106th Grey Cup to Calgary, 27–16.

=== Pittsburgh Steelers ===
On January 4, 2019, Spencer signed a reserve/future contract with the Pittsburgh Steelers of the NFL. He was waived on August 31, 2019.

=== Denver Broncos ===
On September 1, 2019, Spencer was claimed off waivers by the Denver Broncos. Spencer signed a one-year exclusive-rights free agent tender with the Broncos on April 18, 2020. He was placed on the reserve/COVID-19 list by the team on November 27, 2020, and activated on December 10. Spencer had his first career NFL touchdown in Week 14 of the 2020 season, when he returned a punt 83 yards against the Carolina Panthers during the 32–27 win. Spencer was named the AFC Special Teams Player of the Week for his performance in Week 14.

The Broncos placed another exclusive-rights free agent tender on Spencer on March 16, 2021. He signed the one-year contract on April 16.

=== New York Jets ===
On September 6, 2022, Spencer signed with the practice squad of the New York Jets. He was released from the practice squad on September 14. He was then re-signed to the practice squad on September 20. He was once again released from the practice squad a week later. He was re-signed on October 11. He signed a reserve/future contract on January 31, 2023. He was placed on injured reserve on July 19, 2023, but released with an injury settlement nine days later.
