= Rico Murray =

American gridiron football player (born 1988)

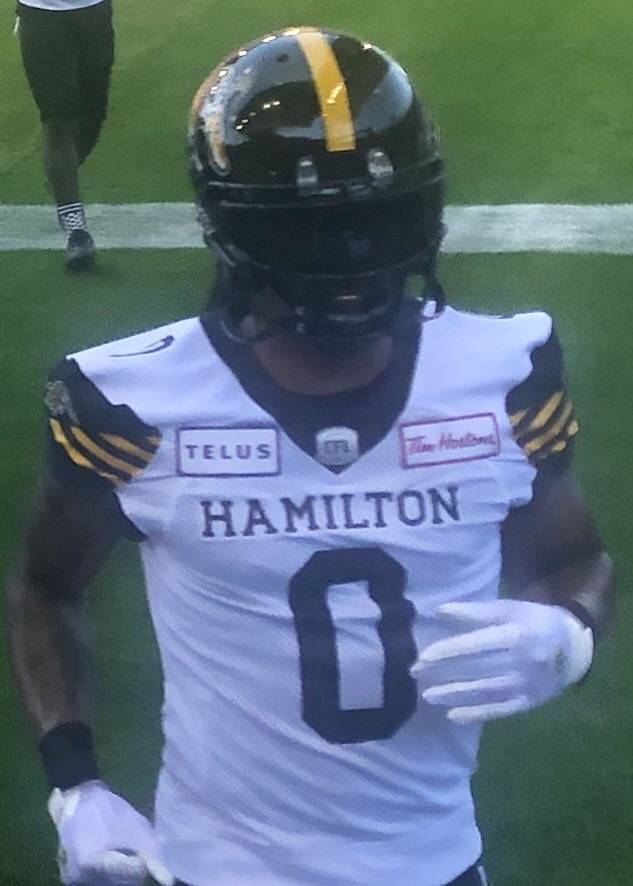

No. 0
- Positions: Defensive back, linebacker

Personal information
- Born: August 21, 1988 (age 38); Cincinnati, Ohio, U.S.
- Listed height: 5 ft 11 in (1.80 m)
- Listed weight: 199 lb (90 kg)

Career information
- High school: Archbishop Moeller (Cincinnati)
- College: Kent State
- NFL draft: 2009: undrafted

Career history
- Cincinnati Bengals (2009–2011); Edmonton Eskimos (2012); Hamilton Tiger-Cats (2013–2016); Toronto Argonauts (2017); Ottawa Redblacks (2018); Hamilton Tiger-Cats (2019–2020)

Awards and highlights
- Grey Cup champion (2017); 3× CFL East All-Star (2014, 2017, 2018)

Career NFL statistics
- Tackles: 19
- Stats at Pro Football Reference

Career CFL statistics
- Tackles: 305
- Sack: 4
- Interceptions: 15
- Stats at CFL.ca

Derico "Rico" Murray (born August 21, 1988) is an American former professional gridiron football defensive back and linebacker. He was signed by the Cincinnati Bengals as an undrafted free agent in 2009. He played college football at Kent State. He has also been a member of the Edmonton Eskimos, Toronto Argonauts, Ottawa Redblacks, and Hamilton Tiger-Cats of the Canadian Football League (CFL).

== College career ==
Murray played 47 games in four seasons (2005–08) at Kent State. He registered a total of 218 defensive tackles (125 solo, 93 assisted), 18 pass breakups, four interceptions, three fumbles forced and two fumble recoveries with the Golden Flashes. In his senior team as a captain he had 72 defensive tackles (47 solo, 27 assisted) and led team with seven pass breakups.

== Professional career ==
=== Cincinnati Bengals ===
After going undrafted in the 2009 NFL draft, Murray signed as a free agent with the Cincinnati Bengals. In 2009, 2010 and 2011 Murray was on the 53-man roster bubble. However, he was released following the first game of the 2011 season on September 14, 2011. He re-joined the Bengals practice squad on January 3, 2012, and was waived on April 12, 2012. During his three-year tenure in the NFL Murray played in 9 games and made 19 tackles.

=== Edmonton Eskimos ===
He signed with the Edmonton Eskimos on June 4, 2012.

=== Hamilton Tiger-Cats ===
He signed with the Hamilton Tiger-Cats of the Canadian Football League (CFL) on July 6, 2013. Murray played four seasons for the Ti-Cats, seeing action in 50 games and contributing 180 tackles on defense, 11 on special teams, 9 interceptions, 4 forced fumbles and 3 sacks. Following the 2016 season he was not re-signed by the Ti-Cats and became a free agent.

=== Toronto Argonauts ===
Murray signed with the Ti-Cats' divisional rival, the Toronto Argonauts, on March 3, 2017. Murray recorded 55 tackles, one interception returned for a score, one sack, and one forced fumble during the year, which would culminate in his being named a CFL East All Star for the second time. Murray also won his first Grey Cup when the Argos defeated the Calgary Stampeders, 27-24.

=== Ottawa Redblacks ===
On the second day of free agency, February 14, 2018, Murray and the Ottawa Redblacks agreed to a one-year contract. Murray proved to be a good fit in the Ottawa defense, playing in all 18 games, and leading in CFL in interceptions with 5 (alongside several other players, including teammate Jonathan Rose). Two of these picks came against his former team, Toronto. Murray also put up 55 tackles, 1 forced fumble, and 3 tackles on special teams, and was named to his third CFL-East All-Star team. Murray was also the team nominee for the CFL's Most Outstanding Defensive Player award. Murray advanced to his fourth career Grey Cup game, but were defeated by Calgary.

=== Hamilton Tiger-Cats (II) ===
After their loss in the 106th Grey Cup, Ottawa did not extend Murray after his All-Star 2018 season. Murray continued his excellent play, with 50 tackles in 18 games played, and two more interceptions, with one taken back for a score. Murray also made 8 tackles in the playoffs, including his fifth Grey Cup game, a losing effort to Winnipeg. After several days as a free agent in early 2019, Murray signed a contract to rejoin the Hamilton Tiger-Cats. Murray retired from professional football on February 18, 2021.
