= William Powell (gridiron football) =

American football player (born 1988)

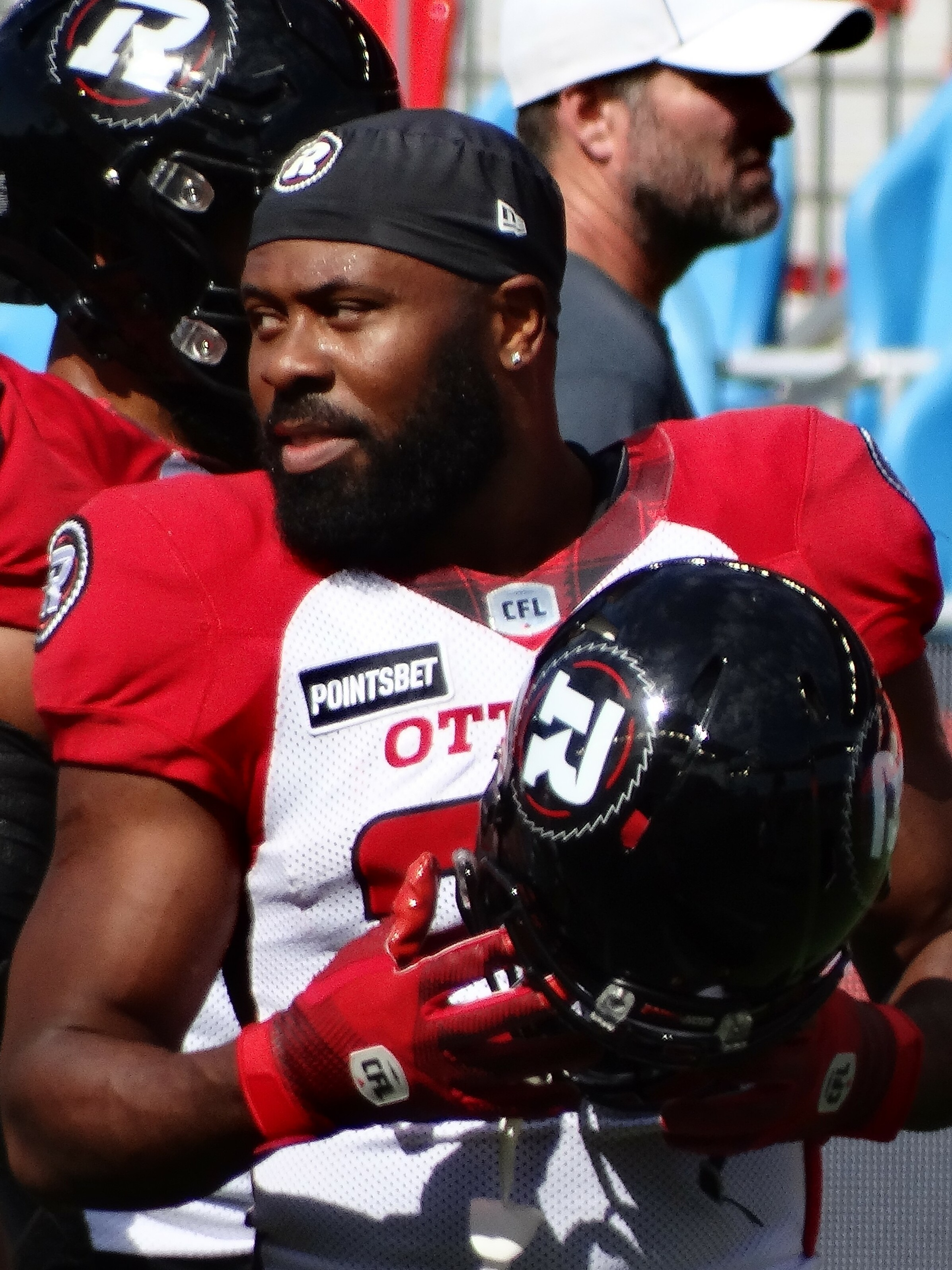
- Powell with the Ottawa Redblacks in 2022

No. 33, 29
- Position: Running back

Personal information
- Born: March 9, 1988 (age 38); Houston, Texas, U.S.
- Listed height: 5 ft 8 in (1.73 m)
- Listed weight: 207 lb (94 kg)

Career information
- High school: Duncanville (Duncanville, Texas)
- College: Kansas State
- NFL draft: 2011: undrafted

Career history
- Arizona Cardinals (2011–2012); Philadelphia Eagles (2013)*; Houston Texans (2014)*; Detroit Lions (2014)*; Ottawa Redblacks (2015–2018); Saskatchewan Roughriders (2019–2021); Ottawa Redblacks (2022)
- * Offseason or practice squad member only

Awards and highlights
- Grey Cup champion (2016); 2× CFL East All-Star (2017, 2018); CFL rushing touchdowns co-leader (2019)

Career NFL statistics
- Rushing attempts: 60
- Rushing yards: 217
- Receptions: 19
- Receiving yards: 132
- Return yards: 507
- Stats at Pro Football Reference

Career CFL statistics
- Rushing attempts: 715
- Rushing yards: 3,928
- Rushing touchdowns: 25
- Stats at CFL.ca

William O. Powell II (born March 9, 1988) is an American former professional football player who was a running back in the National Football League (NFL) and Canadian Football League (CFL). He was a member of the Arizona Cardinals, Philadelphia Eagles, Houston Texans, Detroit Lions, Ottawa Redblacks, and Saskatchewan Roughriders. He played college football for the Kansas State Wildcats.

== Early life ==
William O. Powell II was born in Houston, Texas March 9, 1988. When Powell was about a year old, he and his family relocated to Dallas, TX. Powell is a 2006 Graduate of Duncanville High School in Duncanville, Texas. Powell is the son of the late Darla S. Powell. He is the middle child between two sisters, Brittanye and Jasmyn.

== College career ==
He played college football at Navarro Junior College, and then at Kansas State University. He was never a starter in college, but earned the starting role in 2008 his final year at Navarro, where he led the team in Rushing Yards (937), Touchdowns (8), Carries(139) and Yards Per Carry Average (6.7). He then went on to Kansas State, where he began as a special teams player. He then proceeded to become 2nd on the depth chart behind Daniel Thomas during his 2nd year at Kansas State. He also was given the role of kickoff returner, where he led the nation in Kickoff Return Average (34.5). His season was cut short, however, when he suffered a season ending toe injury against Texas Longhorns. This injury occurred after his 4th and final Collegiate Rushing Touchdown.

== Professional career ==
Pre-draft measurables
Height	Weight	40-yard dash	10-yard split	20-yard split
5 ft 8 1/4 in (1.73 m)	211 lb (96 kg)	4.63 s	1.60 s	2.64 s
All values from Pro Day

=== Arizona Cardinals ===
Powell was not selected in the 2011 NFL draft and was then signed by the Arizona Cardinals. On September 2, 2011, Powell was waived as part of final roster cuts before the beginning of the season. On December 21, 2011, Powell was resigned to the Cardinal's practice squad. Powell was invited back to Cardinals camp in 2012 and would then proceed to make the 53 man roster. Powell would have his first start in the NFL in a game against the San Francisco 49ers. He would finish the season with 217 rushing yards. On April 1, 2013, Powell would sign a one-year contract to remain with the Cardinals. On July 23, 2013, Powell was waived before camp after the Cardinals signed veteran RB Rashard Mendenhall and drafted Stepfan Taylor and Andre Ellington.

=== Philadelphia Eagles ===
On July 24, 2013, the Philadelphia Eagles claimed Powell off waivers. On July 26, 2013, Powell was waived by the Philadelphia Eagles after failing his physical.

=== Houston Texans ===
The Houston Texans signed Powell to a two-year contract on August 11, 2014. The Texans released Powell on August 25, 2014.

=== Detroit Lions ===
Powell signed with the Detroit Lions on September 30, 2014. He was released on October 22, 2014.

=== Ottawa Redblacks (first stint) ===
On September 8, 2015, Powell signed with the Ottawa Redblacks of the Canadian Football League. Powell made his professional debut on October 6, 2015, against the Toronto Argonauts, after an injury to starting running back Jeremiah Johnson. Powell would go on to start the final five games of the regular season, carrying the ball 77 times for 447 yards (4.9 yard average) with two rushing touchdowns. He also contributed in the passing attack catching 19 passes for 158 yards with one receiving touchdown. On June 15, 2016, it was reported that Powell would miss the entire 2016 season with an Achilles injury that he suffered in the team's first preseason game. Set to become a free agent on February 14, 2017, the Reblacks signed Powell to a one-year contract extension on January 31, 2017. On September 29 Powell set a Redblacks franchise record in rushing yards in a single game with 187. Despite missing six regular season games Powell finished second in the league in rushing yards with 1,026, trailing Andrew Harris by a mere nine yards. On January 15, 2018, the Redblacks signed Powell to a one-year contract extension. Powell came just shy of Harris again in 2018, with 1,362 rushing yards and six touchdowns in 16 games played.

=== Saskatchewan Roughriders ===
On February 12, 2019, Powell signed with the Saskatchewan Roughriders. He played in all 18 regular season games in 2019 where he had 215 carries for 1,093 yards and a league-leading 12 touchdowns. After the 2020 CFL season was cancelled, he signed a one-year contract extension with the team on December 17, 2020. In a shortened 2021 season, Powell had 168 rush attempts for 733 yards and three touchdowns. He became a free agent upon the expiry of his contract on February 8, 2022.

=== Ottawa Redblacks (second stint) ===
On February 8, 2022, the Redblacks announced that they had re-signed Powell for the 2022 season, upon the opening of the free agent period. On February 14, 2023, Powell became a free agent.
