= Anthony Cioffi =

American football player (born 1994)

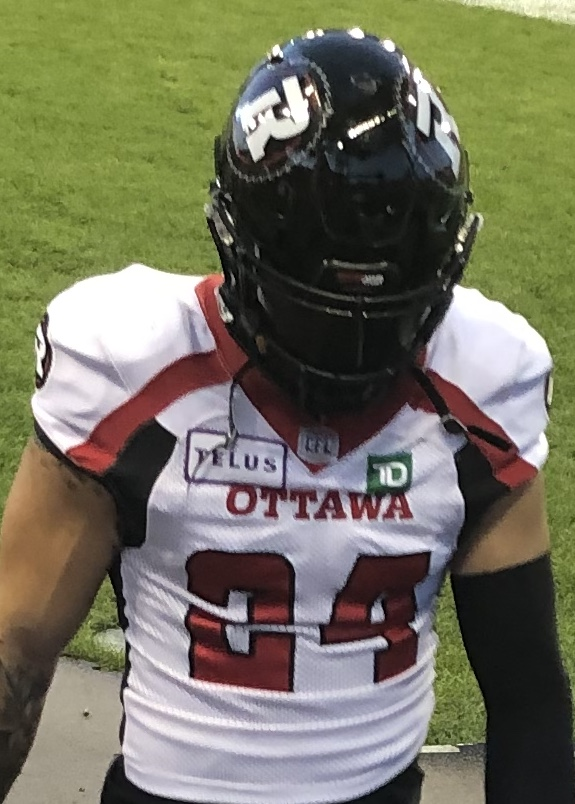
- Cioffi with the Ottawa Redblacks in 2019

Profile
- Positions: Safety, Linebacker

Personal information
- Born: August 26, 1994 (age 32); Springfield, New Jersey, U.S.
- Listed height: 6 ft 0 in (1.83 m)
- Listed weight: 200 lb (91 kg)

Career information
- High school: Springfield (NJ) Dayton
- College: Rutgers
- NFL draft: 2017: undrafted

Career history
- Oakland Raiders (2017)*; Ottawa Redblacks (2018–2019); New York Jets (2020)*; BC Lions (2021); Tampa Bay Bandits (2022); St. Louis Battlehawks (2024)*
- * Offseason or practice squad member only
- Stats at CFL.ca

Anthony Cioffi (born August 26, 1994) is an American professional football safety and linebacker. He played college football for Rutgers University, where he was a four-year starter, as a cornerback his freshman and sophomore years, as a free safety his junior year, and as a strong safety in his senior season. He was signed by the Oakland Raiders as an undrafted free agent in 2017. He spent two years on the CFL's Ottawa Redblacks before signing a futures/reserves contract with the New York Jets of the National Football League. In January 2021, Cioffi signed with the BC Lions.

== Early life ==
Anthony's parents, Jerry and Josephine Cioffi, own a deli in his hometown of Springfield, NJ. His mother is an Italian teacher at Florence M. Gaudineer Middle School while his father and other family members runs the deli, Cioffi's Deli and Pizza. Known for his exceptional speed, Sports Illustrated noted in an April 2017 feature that "...Cioffi and BYU's Micah Hannemann were the only white corners to start for a BCS school recently. Cioffi had earned his way into that coveted corner spot after a stellar high school career at Jonathan Dayton in Springfield, New Jersey and by winning the 2012 Group 1 state title in the 100 meters with a time of 10.86. Cioffi defeated the favorite in that state title race, Anthony Averett, who is now a cornerback for the Baltimore Ravens. He graduated high school with a 2.3 GPA"

== Professional career ==
=== Oakland Raiders ===
Cioffi signed with the Oakland Raiders as an undrafted free agent on May 5, 2017. He was waived on September 2, 2017.

=== Ottawa Redblacks ===
On April 19, 2018, Cioffi signed with the Ottawa Redblacks of the Canadian Football League (CFL).

=== New York Jets ===
On February 13, 2020, Cioffi was signed to a two-year deal by the New York Jets. He was waived on August 15, 2020, but re-signed a week later. He was waived again on August 25, 2020.

=== BC Lions ===
On January 13, 2021, it was announced that Cioffi had signed a one-year contract with the BC Lions. He played in 10 regular season games where he had 23 defensive tackles, one interception, and one forced fumble. He was released prior to free agency on January 11, 2022.

=== Tampa Bay Bandits ===
On February 23, 2022, on the second day of the 2022 USFL draft, the Tampa Bay Bandits picked Cioffi with the 5th pick of the 19th round.

Cioffi and all other Tampa Bay Bandits players were all transferred to the Memphis Showboats after it was announced that the Bandits were taking a hiatus and that the Showboats were joining the league.

On January 21, 2023, Cioffi was released by the Showboats.

=== Vegas Vipers ===
After participating in the XFL Combine, Cioffi's league playing rights were acquired by the Vegas Vipers on August 9, 2023. He signed with the team on October 18, 2023. The Vipers folded when the XFL and USFL merged to create the United Football League (UFL).

=== St. Louis Battlehawks ===
On January 5, 2024, Cioffi was selected by the St. Louis Battlehawks during the 2024 UFL dispersal draft. He was released on March 10, 2024.
