= Trevor Harris =

American football player (born 1986)

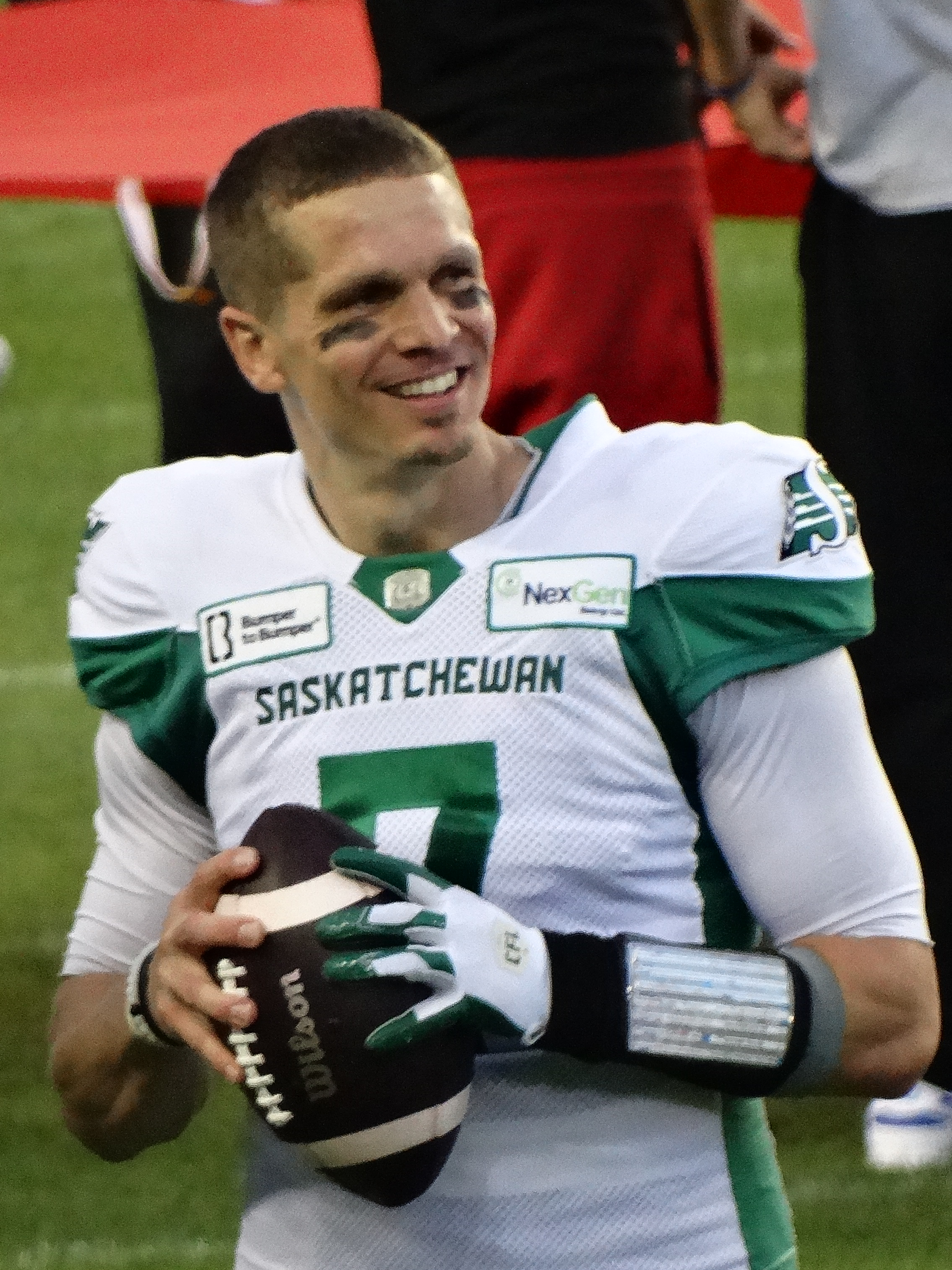
- Harris with the Saskatchewan Roughriders in 2024

No. 7 – Saskatchewan Roughriders
- Position: Quarterback
- Roster status: Active
- CFL status: American

Personal information
- Born: May 31, 1986 (age 40); Waldo, Ohio, U.S.
- Listed height: 6 ft 3 in (1.91 m)
- Listed weight: 212 lb (96 kg)

Career information
- High school: Pleasant (Marion, Ohio)
- College: Edinboro (2005–2009)
- NFL draft: 2010: undrafted

Career history
- Jacksonville Jaguars (2010)*; Arizona Rattlers (2011); Hartford Colonials (2011)*; Buffalo Bills (2011)*; Sacramento Mountain Lions (2011); Orlando Predators (2012)*; Toronto Argonauts (2012–2015); Ottawa Redblacks (2016–2018); Edmonton Eskimos / Elks (2019–2021); Montreal Alouettes (2021–2022); Saskatchewan Roughriders (2023–present)
- * Offseason or practice squad member only

Awards and highlights
- 3× Grey Cup champion (2012, 2016, 2025); Grey Cup Most Valuable Player (2025); CFL passing yards leader (2026); 2× CFL passing touchdowns leader (2015, 2017); CFL East All-Star (2016); CFL West All-Star (2024); 2× PSAC West Offensive Player of the Year (2007, 2008); 3× First-team All-PSAC West (2007–2009); CFL records: Most passing touchdowns, playoff game (6 in 2018); Completion percentage, playoff game (92.3% in 2019); Completion percentage, Grey Cup (85.2% in 2025)

Career CFL statistics as of 2026
- Completions: 3,528
- Attempts: 4,974
- Percentage: 70.9
- TD–INT: 236–110
- Passing yards: 43,067
- Stats at CFL.ca
- Stats at ArenaFan.com

Trevor Harris (born May 31, 1986) is an American professional football quarterback for the Saskatchewan Roughriders of the Canadian Football League (CFL). He played college football at Edinboro University. As Edinboro's starting quarterback, he broke "every career passing record in the Pennsylvania State Athletic Conference" and was a two-time finalist for the Harlon Hill Trophy, awarded each year to the individual selected as the most valuable player in NCAA Division II.

Harris was signed by the Jacksonville Jaguars of the National Football League (NFL) as an undrafted free agent in 2010, and also played in the Arena Football League (AFL). Harris joined the CFL in 2012. He is a two-time CFL divisional all-star, two-time CFL passing touchdowns leader, and has won three Grey Cups (one as a starter, two as a backup). He has also set several single-game CFL playoff records. Harris led the Roughriders to victory in the 112th Grey Cup and was named the Grey Cup Most Valuable Player.

== Early life ==
Harris was an Ohio all-state selection in both football and basketball at Marion Pleasant High School. He was a three-year starter in football, throwing for 1,523 yards and 23 touchdowns as a senior, completing 90 of 149 passes with just 7 interceptions. He was named the Offensive Back of the Year by the North Central Ohio Football Coaches Association, and was also a first team all-NCOFCA choice. He was also a first team All-Mid Ohio Athletic Conference choice and was named the District 11 Player of the Year. He was an All-Ohio selection as a junior, while also being named first team all-MOAC and All-NCOFCA. He completed his career throwing for 4,439 yards with 59 TDs and 19 INTs, adding 6 TDs rushing.

== College career ==
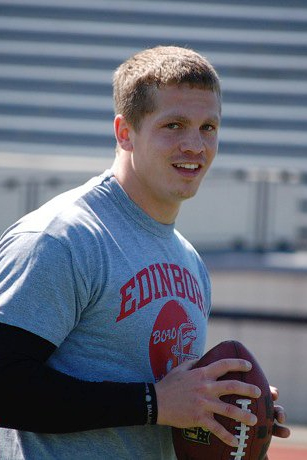
Harris with the Edinboro Fighting Scots in 2010

Harris played collegiate football at Edinboro University of Pennsylvania, a member of NCAA Division II's Pennsylvania State Athletic Conference. Early in his sophomore year, he broke the school's single-game passing record, leading the Pittsburgh Post-Gazette to predict, accurately it turned out, that Harris would "rewrite the school's passing records."

In 2008, he became the third Edinboro player to be a finalist for the Harlon Hill Trophy, and was a finalist again in 2009. Harris was named to the 2009 Consensus Draft Services Preseason All-American Team. He repeated as PSAC West Offensive Player of the Year. He was a three-time All-PSAC West selection and was the PSAC West Rookie of the Year as a freshman.

In his final game at Edinboro, an NCAA playoff game against West Liberty University, Harris set a Division II record with 630 passing yards in a playoff game. West Liberty won the game 84–63, as the two teams combined for 1,394 yards.

Harris finished his career with 11,899 yards passing, completing 66% of his passes and throwing for 100 touchdowns.

== Professional career ==
Pre-draft measurables
Height	Weight	40-yard dash	10-yard split	20-yard split	20-yard shuttle	Three-cone drill	Vertical jump	Broad jump	Bench press
6 ft 1 3/4 in (1.87 m)	223 lb (101 kg)	4.72 s	1.62 s	2.71 s	4.17 s	7.00 s	36.0 in (0.91 m)	9 ft 9 in (2.97 m)	24 reps
All values from Pro Day

=== Jacksonville Jaguars ===
On April 24, 2010, Harris signed with the Jacksonville Jaguars as an undrafted free agent following the 2010 NFL draft. He was waived from the team following the preseason.

=== Arizona Rattlers ===
On November 12, 2010, Harris was signed by the Arizona Rattlers of the Arena Football League (AFL).

=== Hartford Colonials ===
On July 14, 2011, Harris signed with the Hartford Colonials of the United Football League (UFL).

=== Buffalo Bills ===
On July 27, 2011, Harris agreed to terms with the Buffalo Bills. However, due to labour issues in the NFL that year, the team rescinded the contract 36 hours after signing him.

=== Sacramento Mountain Lions ===
Harris signed with the UFL's Sacramento Mountain Lions on September 13, 2011. However, he did not play in any games for the Mountain Lions during the abbreviated 2011 UFL season.

=== Orlando Predators ===
On October 31, 2011, Harris signed with the AFL's Orlando Predators. Prior to the first game of the 2012 AFL season, Orlando believed that the Predator players were going to strike so they released the entire team and played the season opener with replacement players.

=== Toronto Argonauts ===
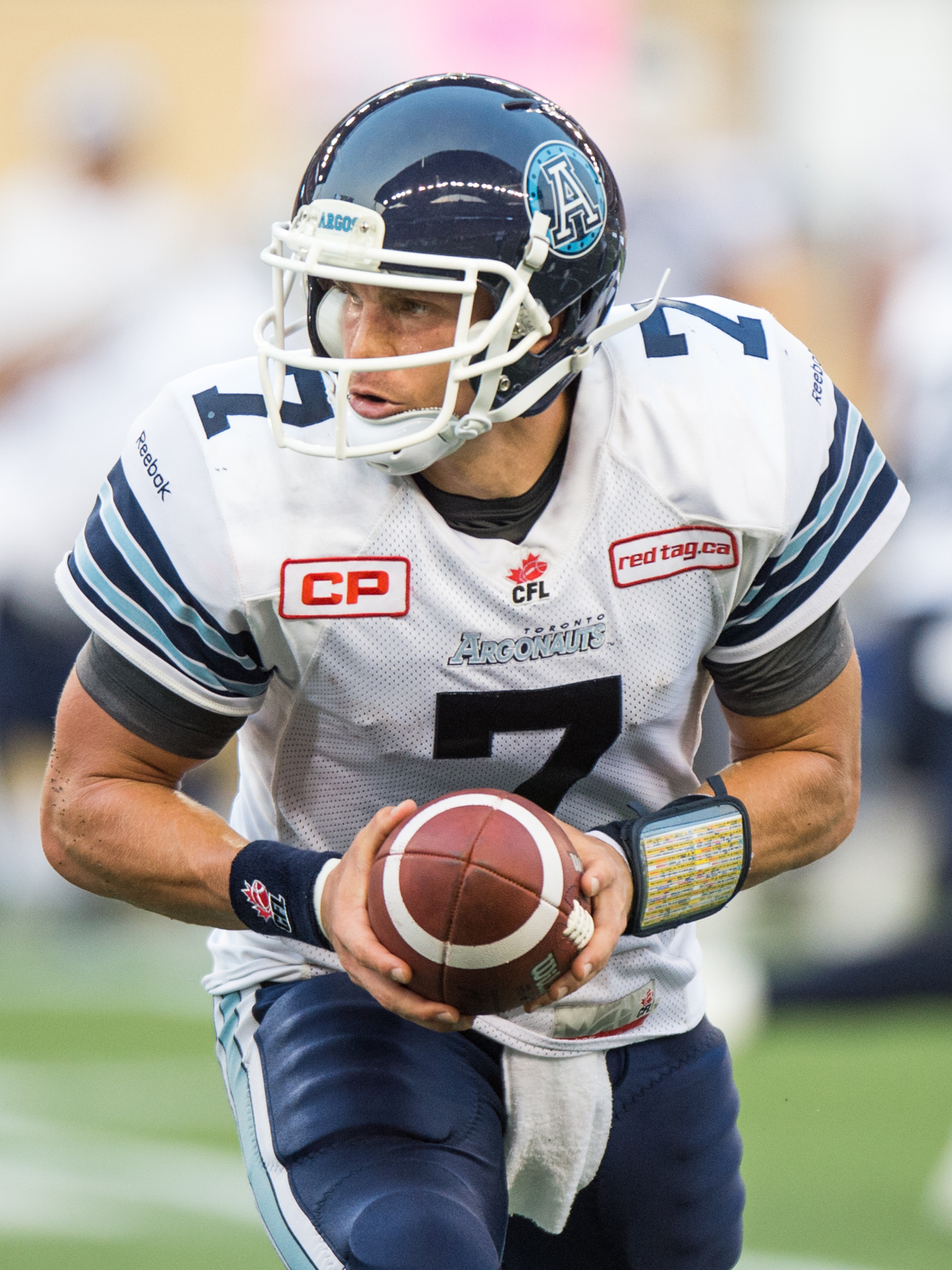
Harris with the Toronto Argonauts in 2015

On March 29, 2012, Harris signed with the Toronto Argonauts of the Canadian Football League. In the Argonauts second, and final, pre-season game of the 2012 season, Harris threw 13 completions in 15 attempts, for 160 yards and two touchdowns. His outstanding performance earned him a spot on the roster. Harris played in two games in the 2012 season completing eight of 19 throws for 80 yards. Harris continued his strong pre-season play in the first preseason game of the 2013 season; completing eight of 11 passing attempts for 115 yards. During the 2014 season Harris started in one game, and played in another five games. For the entire season he attempted 60 passes, completing 42 of them (70% completion percentage), for 449 passing yards with two touchdowns and one interception.

During the 2015 preseason, the Argos announced that Ricky Ray (incumbent starting QB) would miss the first six games of the regular season as he recovered from a torn rotator cuff injury sustained in the 2014 season; Thus making Harris the Argos starting quarterback for Week 1. Trevor Harris started the first 16 games of the CFL season for the Argos as Ricky Ray's injury rehab took longer than expected. During the season, he led the Argos to a record of 9–7 before Ray would start the final two games of the season and the Argos lone playoff game. During his first season as a starting CFL quarterback Harris played admirably. He completed 382 out of 538 pass attempts (71% completion) for 4354 yards with 33 touchdowns and 19 interceptions (both league highs for 2015).

=== Ottawa Redblacks ===
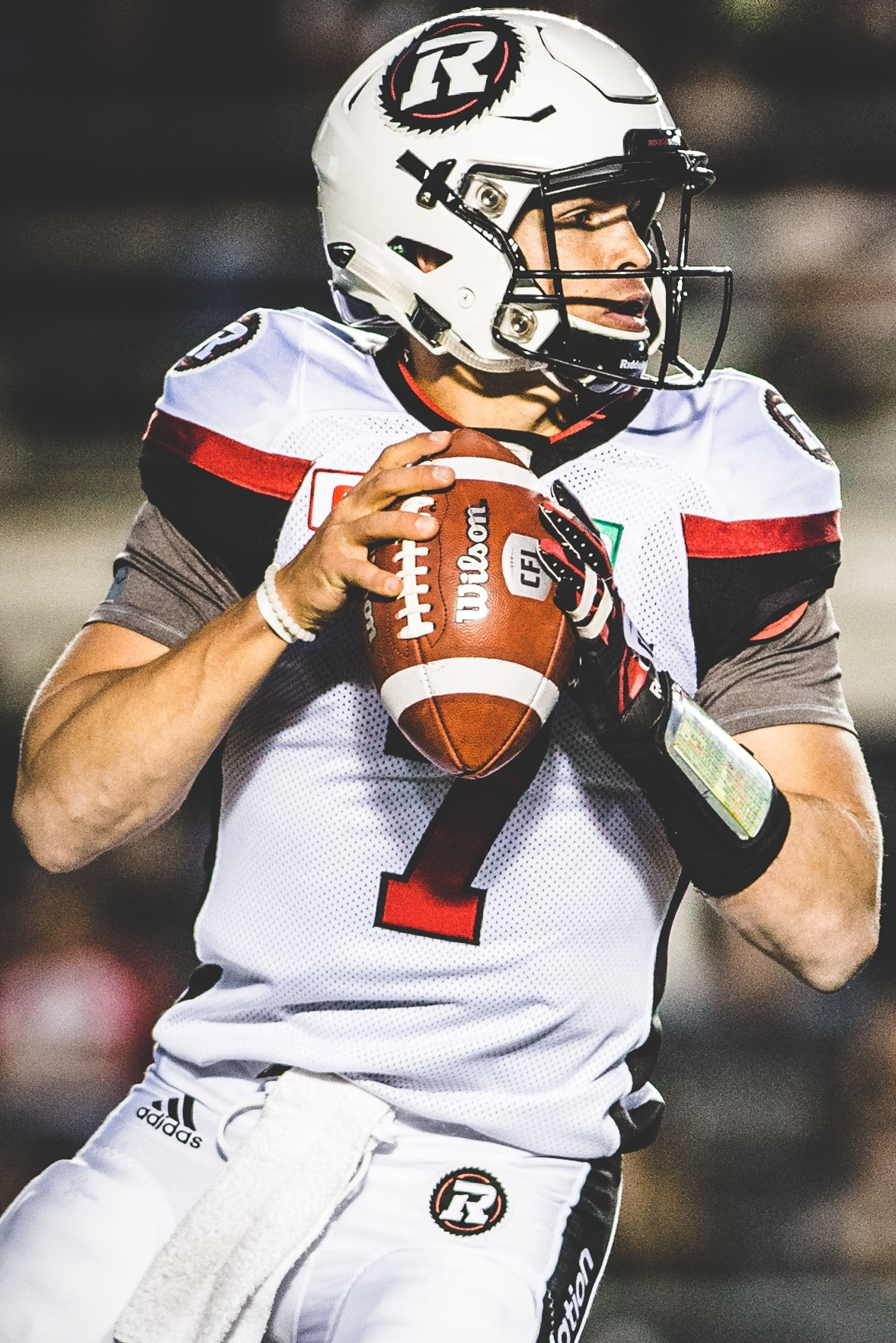
Harris with the Ottawa Redblacks in 2016

Within the first few hours of free-agency starting on February 9, 2016, the Ottawa Redblacks announced that Harris had signed with the team to a two-year contract. He began the season as the backup to Henry Burris who turned 41 years old when the season began. Harris made his Redblacks debut partway through the opening game of the season after Burris injured his finger while receiving the ball from a shotgun snap. Harris completed 17 of 19 passing attempts for 292 yards, with three touchdowns and zero interceptions leading the Redblacks to a dramatic overtime victory over the defending Grey Cup champion Edmonton Eskimos. Following the game, it was announced that Burris would be placed on the 1-game injured list, making Harris the starting quarterback for Week 2. Only a couple days later it was announced that Burris had been transferred to the six-game injured list. Harris was named as a player of the week three times in the month of July, and chosen as the second best player in the month behind teammate wide-receiver Chris Williams. Harris was injured during a July 22 (Week 5) game against the Saskatchewan Roughriders and replaced by back-up Brock Jensen for the rest of the game. The following week (Week 6), Burris returned from his injury as starting quarterback, and Harris was considered week-to-week with knee and ankle injuries. Following their Week 9 loss to the Alouettes, Ottawa head coach Rick Campbell announced that Harris would return to the starting lineup for Week 10 against the BC Lions. In his absence the club had lost three of their four games. Harris started in the next six games for the Redblacks but was ultimately unable to meet expectations, only winning two games and losing four. He was subsequently benched again in favour of Burris. Under Burris' leadership the Redblacks went on to win the 104th Grey Cup. Within a week of winning the Grey Cup Redblacks General Manager Marcel Desjardins stated that based on how the contracts are structured (for Burris and Harris) the team planned for Harris to be their starting quarterback for the 2017 season. Burris retired on January 24, 2017.

Harris started the first 12 games of the 2017 season for the Redblacks before leaving the team's Week 12 game against the Hamilton Tiger-Cats after suffering a shoulder injury. A couple days later it was announced by head coach Rick Campbell that Harris would be out at least a couple weeks with a bruised shoulder. Harris concluded the 2017 campaign having set new career highs in completions, attempts and passing yards, leading Ottawa to the playoffs for the third consecutive season. In Ottawa's East Semi-Final loss against the Saskatchewan Roughriders, which was Harris's first CFL playoff start, he set a record for most pass attempts in a playoff game with 60, and threw the second most pass completions in a playoff game with 37. Not long after the season ended the Redblacks and Harris agreed to a one-year contract extension keeping him with the club through the 2018 CFL season. Harris was set to become a free-agent in February 2018 had both sides not been able to come to deal.

Harris had his most productive season in 2018, setting new career highs in pass attempts and completions, and had his first 5,000 yard season. In the Redblacks' East Final playoff win against the Tiger-Cats, Harris set two new CFL playoff records: one was for the most passing touchdowns in a single playoff game with six; the other was for the highest pass completion percentage in a playoff game at 90.6. His 29 pass completions in 32 pass attempts for 367 yards helped lead the Redblacks to their third Grey Cup appearance in four years. However, Harris and the Redblacks were bested in the 106th Grey Cup by the Calgary Stampeders.

=== Edmonton Eskimos/Elks ===
On February 12, 2019, it was announced that Harris had signed with the Edmonton Eskimos. Harris started in the Eskimos' first 12 games of the season before being ruled out for the team's Week 15 match against the Tiger-Cats with an upper body injury. Subsequently, he was placed on the six-game injured reserve list on September 27, 2019. Harris was activated off of the six-game injured reserve list on October 21, 2019, with two games remaining in the season. He finished the season having played and started in 13 regular season games, but still managed to pass for over 4,000 yards for the fourth time in his career. He also tripled his career touchdowns by rushing for six touchdowns during the 2019 regular season, bringing his career total to nine.

Edmonton played in Montreal for the 2019 East Semi-Final. In this game, Harris once again set the record for the highest pass completion percentage in a playoff game at 92.3, as well as the CFL playoff record for consecutive completions with 22. His 36 completions were third in a single playoff game. Edmonton won the game, but ultimately lost to the Hamilton Tiger-Cats in the East Final.

During the following off-season, on January 31, 2020, Harris signed a contract extension with the Eskimos that would keep him in Edmonton through the 2022 season. Harris did not play in 2020 because the 2020 CFL season was cancelled due to the COVID-19 pandemic.

In 2021, he started the first four games of the season for the Elks before being placed on the six-game injured reserve list with a neck injury on September 16, 2021. On September 27, 2021, Harris was activated off the injured reserve list, however he was not included on the game-day roster for Week 9. Harris returned to his starting role for the Elks' Week 10 match against the Blue Bombers; however, Harris was replaced by rookie Taylor Cornelius in the fourth quarter as Harris proved to be ineffective. On October 12, 2021, Edmonton Elks head coach Jamie Elizondo announced that Cornelius would once again get the Week 11 start ahead of a healthy Trevor Harris who wasn't performing to expectations.

=== Montreal Alouettes ===
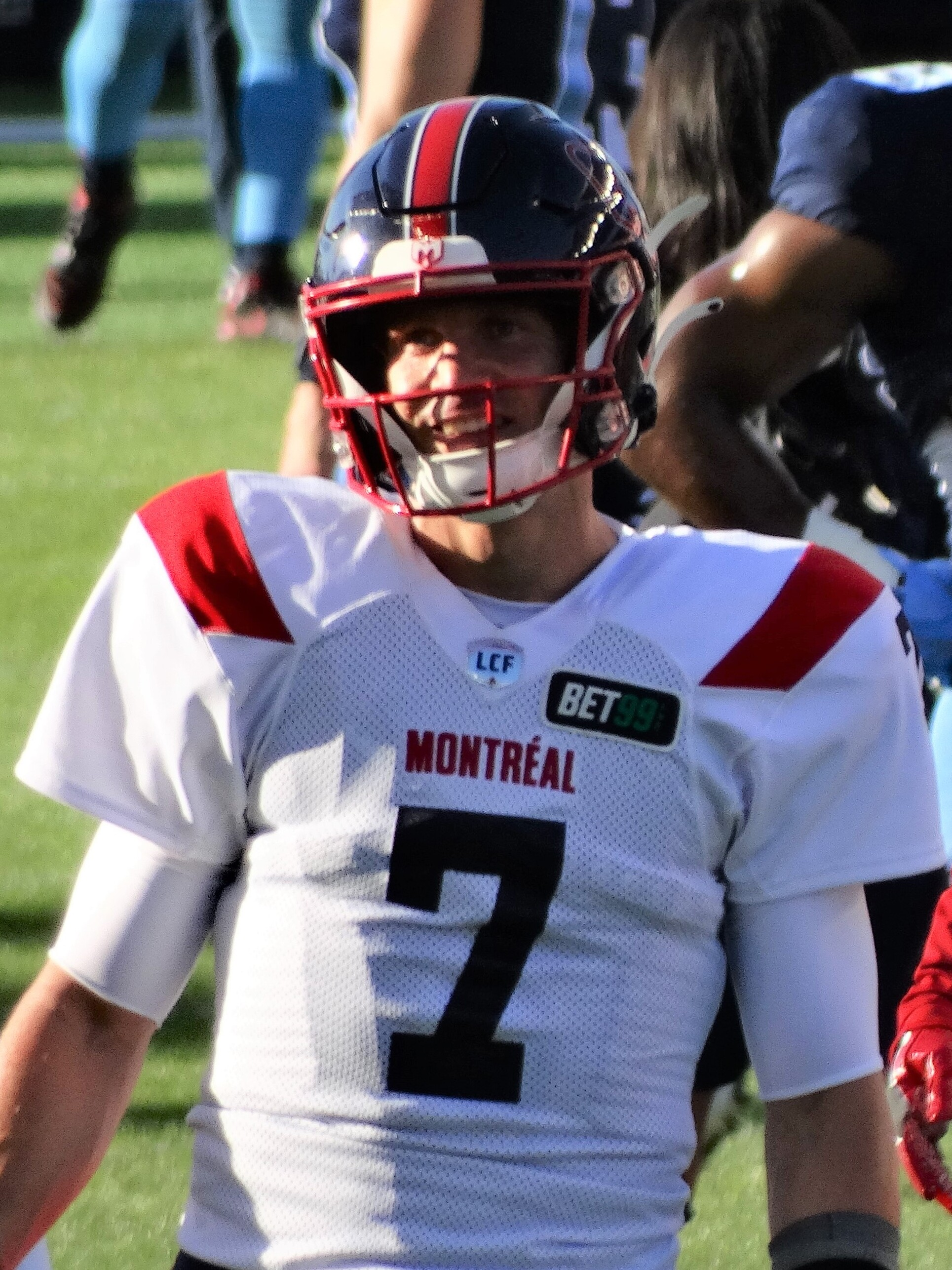
Harris with the Montreal Alouettes in 2022

On October 17, 2021, Harris was traded to the Montreal Alouettes in exchange for Antonio Simmons. Harris played in the final four regular season games to close out the season, starting the last three games. He also started the Alouettes' lone playoff game against the Tiger-Cats, which they lost 23–12, bringing Montreal's season to an end. On December 20, 2021, Harris was released by the Alouettes. According to TSN sports journalist and reporter Dave Naylor, Harris's contract in the 2022 season would have been upwards of $500,000, with a considerable bonus due in the winter offseason. The Alouettes had previously agreed to a contract extension with starting quarterback Vernon Adams.

On February 9, 2022, it was announced that Harris had re-signed with the Alouettes. Harris began the 2022 season as the backup quarterback to Adams, however, after the offence only gained 21 yards in the first quarter of the team's second game, Harris was inserted into the game to lead the team. When Khari Jones was relieved of his duties in early-July, interim head coach Danny Maciocia continued with Harris as the starting quarterback. Harris started 15 games for the Alouettes in 2022, with an 8–7 record, and led the team to a second-place finish in the East Division. After a win over the Hamilton Tiger-Cats in the East Semi-Final, he completed 25 passes out of 30 attempts for 362 yards and one touchdown in the 34–27 loss to the Toronto Argonauts in the East Final. In early February 2023, as a pending free agent, Harris was non-committal about returning to Montreal for the 2023 season.

=== Saskatchewan Roughriders ===
On February 14, 2023, the first day of free agency, Harris signed a two-year contract with the Saskatchewan Roughriders, replacing Cody Fajardo, who coincidentally replaced Harris and signed with the Alouettes, as starting quarterback for the Riders. On July 15, 2023, Harris suffered a tibial plateau fracture of his right knee midway through the fourth quarter of the team's Week 6 loss to the Calgary Stampeders. With the team out of a playoff spot late in the season, Harris did not play again in 2023. In the 2024 season, Harris led the Riders to a 3–0 record with a win over the Elks and two wins over the Tiger-Cats, but he suffered another lower body injury in week 3 against the Tiger-Cats and was placed on the 6-game injured list. After recovering from injury and spending the full six games in the injured list, Harris returned to face his former team, the Alouettes, for the first time since leaving as a free agent, but lost to Montreal 27–24. Harris had an immensely successful season, leading the CFL in passer rating and being named a divisional All-Star for the second time en route to leading the Roughriders to the West Final, where they lost to the Winnipeg Blue Bombers.

On December 6, 2024, the Roughriders announced they had signed Harris to a one-year contract extension. In 2025, he led Saskatchewan to a first-place finish in the West Division with a 12–6 record. In the 112th Grey Cup, Harris completed 23 of 27 passes for 302 yards and a Grey Cup-record 85.2 completion percentage as the Roughriders won 25–17, marking Harris's first Grey Cup win as a starter. He was named the Grey Cup MVP.

Harris returned as the Roughriders' starter in 2026 after signing a one-year contract extension following the Grey Cup; though the team failed to defend their Grey Cup championship, slipped to a 10–8 record and lost in the West Semi-Final, Harris set a career-high with 5,370 passing yards, earning his first passing title. After the season, he signed another one-year contract extension to keep him under contract with the team through 2027.

== Career statistics ==
=== CFL ===
Legend
	Led the league
**Bold**	Career high

==== Regular season ====
		Games			Passing							Rushing
Year	Team	GP	GS	Rec	Comp	Att	Pct	Yards	TD	Int	Rating	Att	Yards	Avg	Long	TD
2011	ARZ	–	–	–	25	37	67.6	272	7	0	128.6	6	25	4.2	–	0
2012	TOR	2	0	0–0	8	19	42.1	80	0	0	54.7	0	0	0.0	0	0
2013	TOR	3	0	0–0	9	15	60.0	176	1	0	**123.2**	3	12	4.0	10	0
2014	TOR	6	1	1–0	42	60	70.0	449	2	1	95.8	5	22	4.4	11	0
2015	TOR	17	16	9–7	382	538	71.0	4,354	**33**	**19**	100.7	47	**212**	4.5	16	1
2016	OTT	12	10	4–5–1	242	330	73.3	3,301	16	4	116.0	30	126	4.2	19	2
2017	OTT	15	15	7–7–1	398	572	69.6	4,679	30	11	103.6	21	77	3.7	12	0
2018	OTT	17	**17**	10–7	**431**	**615**	70.1	5,116	22	11	99.6	27	117	4.3	16	0
2019	EDM	13	13	6–7	343	478	71.8	4,027	16	6	102.9	**48**	139	2.9	**27**	**6**
2020	EDM	Season cancelled								Season cancelled
2021	EDM	6	6	2–4	135	192	70.3	1,568	6	5	94.3	18	62	3.4	9	0
2021	MTL	4	3	1–2	64	91	70.3	703	8	2	113.0	5	43	8.6	14	0
2022	MTL	**18**	15	8–7	331	462	71.6	4,157	20	12	102.9	24	168	7.0	26	0
2023	SSK	5	5	3–2	104	155	67.1	1,274	6	4	94.4	9	94	**10.4**	19	0
2024	SSK	12	11	7–4	260	359	72.4	3,264	20	9	108.4	12	71	5.9	14	2
2025	SSK	17	16	**11–5**	348	473	**73.6**	4,549	24	11	110.7	8	53	6.6	13	0
2026	SSK	17	**17**	9–8	**431**	**615**	70.1	**5,370**	32	15	104.0	15	115	7.7	22	0
AFL totals		-	–	–	25	37	67.6	272	7	0	128.6	6	25	4.2	–	0
CFL totals		214	145	78–65–2	3,528	4,974	70.9	43,067	236	110	103.9	272	1,312	4.8	27	11

==== Postseason ====
CFL playoffs				Passing					Rushing		
Year	Game	GP	GS	Att	Cmp	Yards	TD	Int	Att	Yards	TD
2012	East Semi-Final	1	0	0	–	–	–	–	0	–	–
2012	East Final	1	0	0	–	–	–	–	0	–	–
2013	East Final	1	0	0	–	–	–	–	0	–	–
2015	East Semi-Final	1	0	2	1	10	0	0	1	1	0
2016	East Final	1	0	0	–	–	–	–	0	–	–
2017	East Semi-Final	1	1	60	37	457	2	2	1	4	0
2018	East Final	1	1	32	29	367	6	0	0	–	–
2019	*East Semi-Final	1	1	39	36	421	1	1	3	3	0
2019	*East Final	1	1	41	29	319	1	2	7	26	0
2021	East Semi-Final	1	1	44	28	364	1	1	1	10	0
2022	East Semi-Final	1	1	34	27	243	1	1	0	–	–
2022	East Final	1	1	30	25	362	1	0	0		
2024	West Semi-Final	1	1	33	26	279	1	1	0	–	–
2024	West Final	1	1	44	25	283	1	0	0	–	–
2025	West Final	1	1	38	26	305	2	0	3	15	–
2026	West Semi-Final	1	1	40	29	309	0	1	0	–	–
CFL totals		16	11	437	318	3,719	17	8	16	59	0

*Team qualified for Crossover

==== Grey Cup ====
Grey Cup				Passing					Rushing		
Year	Team	GP	GS	Att	Cmp	Yards	TD	Int	Att	Yards	TD
2012	TOR	1	0	0	–	–	–	–	0	–	–
2016	OTT	1	0	0	–	–	–	–	0	–	–
2018	OTT	1	1	38	20	288	1	3	1	5	0
2025	SSK	1	1	27	23	302	0	0	0	–	–
CFL totals		4	2	65	43	590	1	3	1	5	0

=== College ===
Year	Team	Games			Passing								Rushing			
Year	Team	GP	GS	Record	Cmp	Att	Pct	Yds	Y/A	TD	Int	Rtg	Att	Yds	Avg	TD
2006	Edinboro	11	11	6–5	192	313	61.3	2,547	8.1	20	7	146.3	64	−54	−0.8	0
2007	Edinboro	11	11	7–4	292	426	68.5	3,268	7.7	30	10	151.5	80	250	3.1	5
2008	Edinboro	11	11	9–2	213	323	65.9	2,780	8.6	26	6	161.1	63	226	3.6	4
2009	Edinboro	12	12	8–4	269	402	66.9	3,304	8.2	24	8	151.7	112	370	3.3	6
Career		45	45	30–15	966	1,464	66.0	11,899	8.1	100	31	152.6	319	792	2.5	15
Source: 2006–2009 Edinboro football statistical files.

== See also ==
- List of gridiron football quarterbacks passing statistics
