= Jonathan Rose =

American gridiron football player (born 1993)

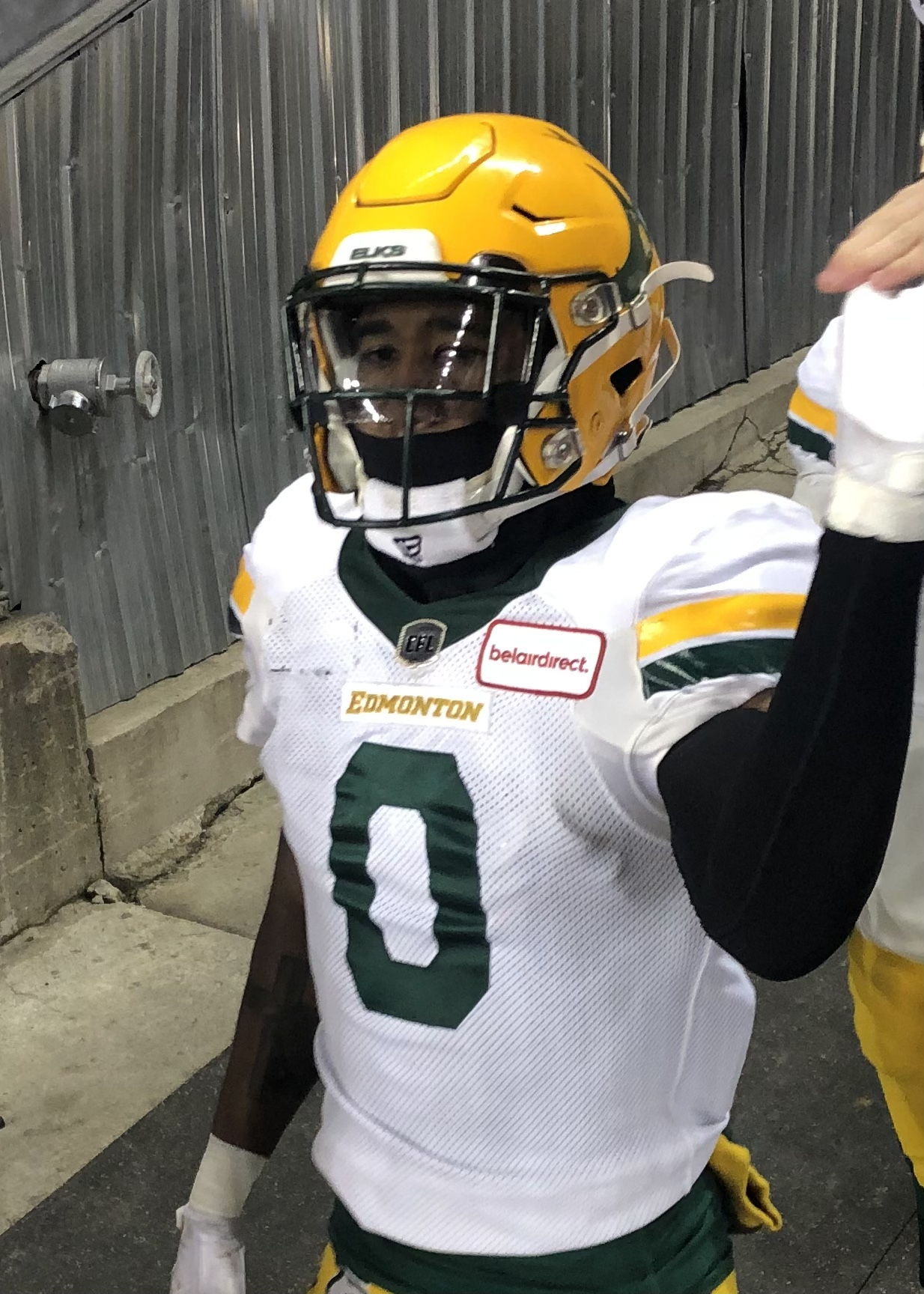
- Rose with the Edmonton Elks in 2021

Profile
- Position: Defensive back

Personal information
- Born: July 19, 1993 (age 33); Leeds, Alabama, U.S.
- Listed height: 6 ft 1 in (1.85 m)
- Listed weight: 190 lb (86 kg)

Career information
- High school: Leeds
- College: Auburn (2011); Nebraska (2012–2015)
- NFL draft: 2016: undrafted

Career history
- Ottawa Redblacks (2016–2019); Edmonton Elks (2021)

Awards and highlights
- Grey Cup champion (2016); CFL East Division All-Star (2016, 2018)

Career CFL statistics
- Total tackles: 153
- Sacks: 1
- Forced fumbles: 6
- Interceptions: 9
- Stats at CFL.ca

Jonathan Rose (born July 19, 1993) is an American former professional gridiron football defensive back. He played for the Ottawa Redblacks and Edmonton Elks of the Canadian Football League (CFL). He played college football at Auburn and Nebraska.

== College career ==
Rose began his college football career at Auburn. He played for Auburn as a freshman in 2011, but was then dismissed from the team for "personal reasons" in July 2012. He signed with Nebraska in August 2012. After sitting out the 2012 season, Rose played for Nebraska from 2013 to 2015. During the 2015 season, Rose was suspended for Nebraska's game against BYU, then was suspended for games against Northwestern and Purdue due to a violation of team rules. In December 2015, Nebraska announced Rose had been dismissed from the team.

== Professional career ==
=== Ottawa Redblacks ===
After going undrafted in the 2016 NFL draft Rose signed with the Ottawa Redblacks in June 2016. Rose started 14 games for Ottawa in 2016 and was named a 2016 East Division All-Star. Rose helped the Redblacks win the 104th Grey Cup, recording six tackles in the win. During the 2017 season, Rose had 53 defensive tackles and two interceptions. On February 12, 2018, Rose signed a one-year contract extension with Ottawa. Rose played in 17 games in the 2018 season, and led the league in interceptions with five (alongside four other players, including teammate Rico Murray) and also lead the league in forced fumbles with 4. Both players were named to the East Division All-Star Team by the end of the regular season. Following the season Rose and the Redblacks agreed to another one-year contract extension.

=== Edmonton Elks ===
Rose signed with the Edmonton Elks on January 4, 2021. He played in 13 games for the Elks in 2021 and was released on December 28, 2021.
