= Jean-Christophe Beaulieu =

Canadian player of Canadian football

Profile
- Position: Fullback

Personal information
- Born: May 6, 1990 (age 36); Trois-Rivières, Quebec, Canada
- Listed height: 6 ft 3 in (1.91 m)
- Listed weight: 220 lb (100 kg)

Career information
- University: Sherbrooke
- CFL draft: 2014: 6th round, 49th overall pick

Career history
- 2014–2017: Montreal Alouettes
- 2018–2019: Ottawa Redblacks
- Stats at CFL.ca

Jean-Christophe Beaulieu (also known as 'J.C Beaulieu') (born May 6, 1990) is a Canadian former professional football fullback who played in the Canadian Football League (CFL) for the Montreal Alouettes and Ottawa Redblacks. He was selected by the Alouettes in the sixth round of the 2014 CFL draft after playing CIS football at the Université de Sherbrooke.

== College career ==
Beaulieu played in nine games for the Sherbrooke Vert et Or during his senior year in 2013, rushing for 55 yards and three touchdowns on 19 carries. He also caught four passes for 34 yards and one touchdown.

== Professional career ==
=== Montreal Alouettes ===
Beaulieu was selected by the Montreal Alouettes with the 49th pick in the 2014 CFL draft. He signed with the team on May 27, 2014. He played in ten games for the Alouettes in 2014, rushing for two yards on one carry and catching two passes for ten yards. Beaulieu also blocked a punt. He started eighteen games in 2015, recording five receptions for 65 yards and a touchdown. He signed a three-year deal with the Alouettes on February 1, 2016. In four seasons with Montreal Beaulieu was used sparingly on offense; he carried the ball 11 times for 104 yards with one touchdown, he also caught 23 passes for 202 yards with one touchdown.

=== Ottawa Redblacks ===
On January 30, 2018, Beaulieu was traded to the Ottawa Redblacks in exchange for Patrick Lavoie. Beaulieu was released on March 2, 2020.
