= List of Ottawa Redblacks first-round draft picks =

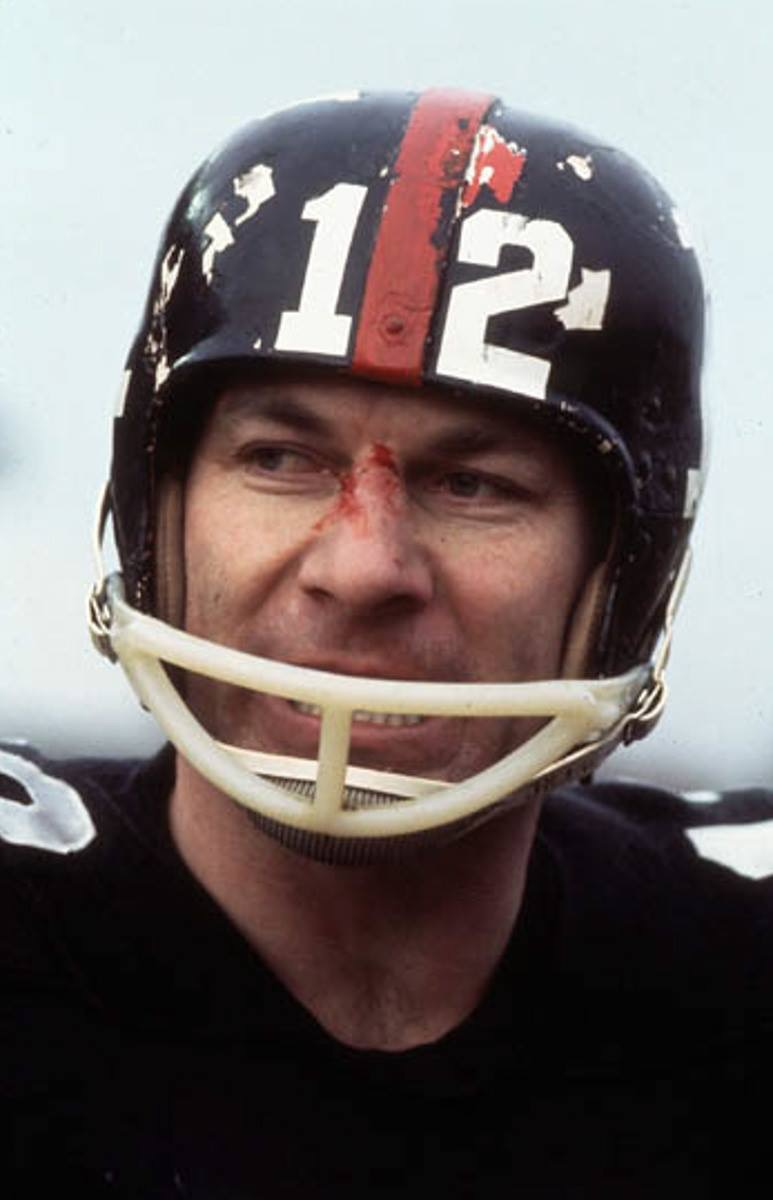
Russ Jackson is the only Ottawa first-round draft pick to enter the Canadian Football Hall of Fame as a CFL player.

The following is a complete list of first-round draft picks selected by the Ottawa Redblacks of the Canadian Football League (CFL). Ottawa participated in the first Canadian college draft in 1953 when only eastern teams were permitted to make selections. From 1960-1962, only eastern teams and the Calgary Stampeders participated in the draft as the other western clubs signed players from universities in their area. This list also includes all territorial exemptions from 1973, when teams were first permitted to selected players within their designated area, until 1985 when these exemptions were abolished.

As defined in the 2016 CFL's Facts, Figures, and Records and the 2023 CFL Guide & Record Book, for historical record purposes and by the current Ottawa Redblacks' request, the Ottawa Football Clubs are considered to be a single entity since 1876 with two periods of inactivity (1997–2001 and 2006–2013). Consequently, this list includes figures from the Ottawa Football Club (1876–1898), Ottawa Rough Riders (1899–1919, 1931–1996), Ottawa Senators (1920–1930), Ottawa Renegades (2002–2005), and Ottawa Redblacks (2014–present). After being scheduled to re-enter the league in 2014, the Ottawa Redblacks participated in the 2013 CFL draft where they were only eligible to select NCAA redshirt juniors. Thereafter, starting with their first season in 2014, they were able to select any draft-eligible player in the CFL draft.

Ottawa has had the first overall selection in the draft 10 times since its inception in 1953. Since 1953, the club has lost their first round pick six times due to trades. Not including territorial exemptions, the most first-round picks Ottawa has had in one year is four, which occurred in the 1968 CFL draft.

== Player selections ==
| = CFL Division All-Star | = CFL All-Star | = Hall of Famer |

| Year | Pick | Player name | Position | College | Notes |
|---|---|---|---|---|---|
| 1952 | 4 | Bob Garside | Halfback | Toronto | |
| 1953 | 2 | Joe Harris | Tackle | Toronto | |
| 1954 | 2 | George Klein | Halfback | McGill | |
| 1955 | 1 | Gino Fracas | Halfback | Western Ontario | |
| 1956 | 1 | Lou Bruce | End | Queen's | |
| 1957 | 3 | Russ Radchuk | Guard | Queen's | |
| 1958 | 6 | Russ Jackson | Halfback | McMaster | |
| 1959 | 4 | Jocko Thompson | Placekicker/Halfback | Queen's | |
| 1960 | 4 | Steve Chisholm | Halfback | Toronto | |
| 1961 | 5 | Paul Burroughs | Halfback | Toronto | |
| 1962 | 4 | Chuck Wood | Guard | McGill | |
| 1963 | 4 | Rick Black | Halfback | Mount Allison | |
| 1963 | 5 | Peter Quinn | Halfback | Queen's | |
| 1963 | 6 | Bill Miklas | Guard | Queen's | |
| 1964 | 6 | Peter Martin | Fullback | Western Ontario | |
| 1965 | 6 | Brian Bentley | Centre | Mount Allison | |
| 1966 | 6 | Glen Markle | Defensive back | Toronto | |
| 1967 | 8 | Greg McQueen | Halfback | Waterloo | |
| 1968 | 2 | Paul Brule | Halfback | St. Francis Xavier | |
| 1968 | 6 | Darryl Burgess | Linebacker | Saint Mary's | |
| 1968 | 7 | Ron Wakelin | Guard | Toronto | |
| 1968 | 9 | Don Cooper | Centre | Bishop's | |
| 1969 | 9 | Jim Foley | Quarterback | St. Dunstan's | |
| 1970 | 9 | Mike Sharp | Quarterback | Carleton | |
| 1971 | 2 | Bob Eccles | Linebacker | Carleton | |
| 1972 | - | No pick | - | - | Traded to Hamilton |
| 1973 | Ex | Donn Smith | Tackle | Purdue | |
| 1973 | - | No pick | - | - | Traded to Edmonton |
| 1974 | Ex | Perry Arnold | Defensive back | Western Ontario | |
| 1974 | Ex | Darryl Craig | Tackle | North Carolina | |
| 1974 | 8 | Dave Hadden | Defensive back | Queen's | |
| 1974 | 9 | Bob Rushton | Defensive lineman | Otterbein | |
| 1975 | Ex | Peter Stenerson | Quarterback | Carleton | |
| 1975 | Ex | Jeff Turcotte | Defensive tackle | Utah State | |
| 1975 | 7 | Marvin Allemang | Linebacker | Acadia | |
| 1976 | Ex | Jeff Avery | Wide receiver | Ottawa | |
| 1976 | Ex | John Palazeti | Tailback | Richmond | |
| 1976 | 4 | Steve Gelley | Defensive back | Simon Fraser | |
| 1976 | 6 | Bill Hatanaka | Wide receiver | York | |
| 1977 | Ex | Mike Murphy | Tailback | Ottawa | |
| 1977 | Ex | Doug McGee | Guard | Richmond | |
| 1977 | Ex | Dan Fournier | Wide receiver | Princeton | |
| 1977 | Ex | Brian McLaughlin | Tackle | Simon Fraser | |
| 1977 | 1 | Mike Riley | Defensive tackle | Dalhousie | Acquired from Calgary |
| 1977 | 9 | Kirk DeFazio | Defensive back | Waterloo | |
| 1978 | Ex | Dick Bakker | Tackle | Queen's | |
| 1978 | Ex | Bruce Walker | Wide receiver | Windsor | |
| 1978 | 7 | Dan Taylor | Tailback | Iowa Central | |
| 1979 | Ex | Malcolm Inglis | Tackle | Carleton | |
| 1979 | Ex | Pat Stoqua | Defensive back | Carleton | |
| 1979 | 6 | Carm Carteri | Linebacker | Montana | |
| 1980 | Ex | Gary Cook | Slotback | Carleton | |
| 1980 | Ex | Glenn Cook | Cornerback | Richmond | |
| 1980 | 6 | Pat McBride | Centre | North Dakota State | |
| 1981 | Ex | John Park | Tight end | Bowling Green | |
| 1981 | Ex | Ian Beckstead | Tight end | Richmond | |
| 1981 | 3 | Maurice Doyle | Running back | Toronto | |
| 1982 | Ex | Mark Seale | Defensive tackle | Richmond | |
| 1982 | Ex | Kevin Dalliday | Guard/Defensive tackle | Carleton | |
| 1982 | Ex | Ron St. Poulton | Defensive back | McGill | |
| 1982 | - | No pick | - | - | Traded to BC |
| 1983 | Ex | Roger Cattelan | Tackle | Boston College | |
| 1983 | Ex | Mike Hudson | Tight end | Guelph | Acquired from Montreal |
| 1983 | 2 | Steve Harrison | Linebacker | British Columbia | |
| 1984 | Ex | Michel Bourgeau | Defensive tackle | Boise State | |
| 1984 | Ex | Jim De Silva | Offensive lineman | Carleton | Acquired from Montreal |
| 1984 | 4 | Maurice Martin | Defensive back | Toronto | |
| 1985 | 1 | Nick Benjamin | Offensive lineman | Concordia | |
| 1986 | 4 | Michael Schad | Tackle | Queen's | |
| 1987 | 1 | Leo Groenewegen | Offensive lineman | British Columbia | |
| 1988 | 1 | Orville Lee | Running back | Simon Fraser | |
| 1989 | 1 | Gerald Wilcox | Slotback | Weber State | |
| 1990 | - | No pick | - | - | Traded to Edmonton |
| 1991 | 7 | Brett MacNeil | Tackle | Boston | |
| 1992 | 3 | Denny Chronopoulos | Guard | Purdue | |
| 1993 | 3 | Paul Yatkowski | Defensive tackle | Tennessee | |
| 1994 | 5 | Tony Bailey | Defensive end | Saint Mary's | |
| 1994 | 7 | Rod Murphy | Linebacker | Idaho State | |
| 1995 | 2 | Stefen Reid | Linebacker | Boise State | |
| 1996 | - | No pick | - | - | Traded to Edmonton |
| 2002 | 1 | Alexandre Gauthier | Offensive lineman | Laval | |
| 2002 | 2 | Mike Vilimek | Running back | Simon Fraser | |
| 2003 | - | No pick | - | - | Traded to Edmonton |
| 2004 | 2 | Ibrahim Khan | Offensive lineman | Simon Fraser | |
| 2004 | 3 | David Azzi | Wide receiver | Ottawa | |
| 2005 | 2 | Cam Yeow | Linebacker | Akron | |
| 2013 | 9 | Nolan MacMillan | Offensive lineman | Iowa | |
| 2014 | 4 | Antoine Pruneau | Defensive back | Montreal | Acquired from Montreal |
| 2015 | 1 | Alex Mateas | Offensive lineman | Connecticut | |
| 2016 | 7 | Jason Lauzon-Seguin | Offensive lineman | Laval | |
| 2017 | 9 | Evan Johnson | Offensive lineman | Saskatchewan | |
| 2018 | 4 | Mark Korte | Offensive lineman | Alberta | |
| 2019 | 7 | Alex Fontana | Offensive lineman | Kansas | |
| 2020 | 6 | Adam Auclair | Defensive back | Laval | Acquired from Calgary |
| 2021 | 6 | Deshawn Stevens | Linebacker | Maine | |
| 2022 | 2 | Zack Pelehos | Offensive lineman | Ottawa | |
| 2023 | 1 | Dontae Bull | Offensive lineman | Fresno State | |
| 2024 | 2 | Nick Mardner | Wide receiver | Auburn | |
| 2025 | 3 | Keelan White | Wide receiver | Montana | |
| 2026 | 1 | Giordano Vaccaro | Offensive lineman | Purdue | |
