= 2019 Ottawa Redblacks season =

Canadian football team season

- General manager: Marcel Desjardins
- Head coach: Rick Campbell
- Home stadium: TD Place Stadium

Results
- Record: 3–15
- Division place: 4th, East
- Playoffs: did not qualify
- Team MOP: Avery Williams
- Team MOC: Nolan MacMillan
- Team MOR: Jerod Fernandez

Uniform

The 2019 Ottawa Redblacks season was the sixth season for the team in the Canadian Football League (CFL). This was the sixth season with Marcel Desjardins as general manager and Rick Campbell as head coach.

The Redblacks were eliminated from playoff contention for the first time since their inaugural season in 2014 following a week 18 loss to the Toronto Argonauts on October 11, 2019.

== Offseason ==
=== Free-Agency ===
The 2018 CFL free agency period officially opened at 12:00pm EST on February 12, 2019. Significant transactions are listed below:

==== Retained ====
Date	Player name	Position	Ref.
January 14, 2019	Nolan Macmillan	OL	
January 25, 2019	Dominique Davis	QB	
February 2, 2019	Jason Lauzon-Seguin	OL	
February 5, 2019	Jonathan Rose	DB	

==== Additions ====
Date	Player name	Position	Previous Team	Ref.
January 25, 2019	Chris Randle	DB	Winnipeg Blue Bombers	
February 13, 2019	Jonathan Jennings	QB	BC Lions	

==== Departed ====
Date	Player name	Position	New Team	Ref.
January 4, 2019	Diontae Spencer	WR	Pittsburgh Steelers (NFL)	
February 12, 2019	Trevor Harris	QB	Edmonton Eskimos	
February 12, 2019	Greg Ellingson	WR	Edmonton Eskimos	
February 12, 2019	SirVincent Rogers	OL	Edmonton Eskimos	
February 12, 2019	William Powell	RB	Saskatchewan Roughriders	
February 14, 2019	Rico Murray	DB	Hamilton Tiger-Cats	
February 14, 2019	A.C. Leonard	DL	Saskatchewan Roughriders	

=== Foreign drafts ===
For the first time in its history, the CFL held drafts for foreign players from Mexico and Europe. Like all other CFL teams, the Redblacks held three non-tradeable selections in the 2019 CFL–LFA draft, which took place on January 14, 2019. The 2019 European CFL draft took place on April 11, 2019 where all teams held one non-tradeable pick.

Draft	Round	Pick	Player	Position	School/Club team	Hometown
LFA	1	2	José Maltos	K	UANL; Fundidores Monterrey	Monterrey, Mexico
LFA	2	11	Guillermo Villalobos	WR	ITESM–Monterrey; Mexicas de la Ciudad de México	Mexico City, Mexico
LFA	3	20	Maximiliano Esquer	DE	ITESM–Monterrey	Monterrey, Mexico
Euro	1	8	Jordan Bouah	WR	Saddleback CC	Rome, Italy

=== CFL draft ===
The 2019 CFL draft took place on May 2, 2019. By virtue of being the 106th Grey Cup runner-up, the Redblacks had the second-last selection in each round, not including traded picks. The team traded their second-round pick to the Montreal Alouettes in exchange for Chris Ackie.

Round	Pick	Player	Position	School	Hometown
1	7	Alex Fontana	OL	Kansas	Toronto, ON
3	27	Gabriel Polan	RB	Sherbrooke	Montreal, QC
4	36	Thomas Grant	DL	Acadia	Halifax, NS
5	45	Wesley Lewis	WR	Houston Baptist	Houston, TX
6	54	Chris Larsen	DL	Manitoba	Toronto, ON
7	63	Samson Abbott	DL	Manitoba	Winnipeg, MB
8	72	Clement Lebreux	DL	Laval	Longueuil, QC

== Preseason ==
=== Schedule ===
Week	Game	Date	Kickoff	Opponent	Results		TV	Venue	Attendance	Summary
Week	Game	Date	Kickoff	Opponent	Score	Record	TV	Venue	Attendance	Summary
A	Bye									
B	1	Sat, June 1	7:00 p.m. EDT	Hamilton Tiger-Cats	L 21–25	0–1	TSN	TD Place Stadium	22,318	Recap
C	2	Thurs, June 6	7:30 p.m. EDT	@ Montreal Alouettes	T 20–20	0–1–1	TSN/RDS	Molson Stadium	13,474	Recap

# Games played with colour uniforms.

== Regular season ==
=== Standings ===
East Division
Team	GP	W	L	T	Pts	PF	PA	Div	Stk	
Hamilton Tiger-Cats	18	15	3	0	30	551	344	7–1	W6	Details
Montreal Alouettes	18	10	8	0	20	479	485	5–3	W1	Details
Toronto Argonauts	18	4	14	0	8	373	562	3–5	L1	Details
Ottawa Redblacks	18	3	15	0	6	312	564	1–7	L11	Details

=== Schedule ===
Week	Game	Date	Kickoff	Opponent	Results		TV	Venue	Attendance	Summary
Week	Game	Date	Kickoff	Opponent	Score	Record	TV	Venue	Attendance	Summary
1	1	Sat, June 15	7:00 p.m. EDT	@ Calgary Stampeders	W 32–28	1–0	TSN/ESPNews	McMahon Stadium	26,301	Recap
2	2	Thu, June 20	7:30 p.m. EDT	Saskatchewan Roughriders	W 44–41	2–0	TSN/RDS	TD Place Stadium	23,453	Recap
3	Bye									
4	3	Fri, July 5	7:30 p.m. EDT	Winnipeg Blue Bombers	L 14–29	2–1	TSN/RDS	TD Place Stadium	20,429	Recap
5	4	Sat, July 13	4:00 p.m. EDT	Montreal Alouettes	L 19–36	2–2	TSN/RDS/ESPN2	TD Place Stadium	21,536	Recap
6	5	Fri, July 19	8:30 p.m. EDT	@ Winnipeg Blue Bombers	L 1–31	2–3	TSN/RDS	IG Field	25,350	Recap
7	6	Thu, July 25	7:00 p.m. EDT	Calgary Stampeders	L 16–17	2–4	TSN/RDS	TD Place Stadium	22,708	Recap
8	7	Fri, Aug 2	7:00 p.m. EDT	@ Montreal Alouettes	W 30–27 (OT)	3–4	TSN/RDS	Molson Stadium	17,498	Recap
9	8	Fri, Aug 9	10:00 p.m. EDT	@ Edmonton Eskimos	L 12–16	3–5	TSN/ESPN2	Commonwealth Stadium	27,951	Recap
10	9	Sat, Aug 17	4:00 p.m. EDT	Hamilton Tiger-Cats	L 7–21	3–6	TSN/RDS2	TD Place Stadium	23,214	Recap
11	10	Sat, Aug 24	7:00 p.m. EDT	@ Saskatchewan Roughriders	L 18–40	3–7	TSN/RDS	Mosaic Stadium	32,328	Recap
12	Bye									
13	11	Sat, Sept 7	1:00 p.m. EDT	Toronto Argonauts	L 17–46	3–8	TSN/RDS2	TD Place Stadium	22,489	Recap
14	12	Fri, Sept 13	10:00 p.m. EDT	@ BC Lions	L 5–29	3–9	TSN/ESPN2	BC Place	15,052	Recap
15	13	Sat, Sept 21	7:00 p.m. EDT	BC Lions	L 7–40	3–10	TSN/RDS2	TD Place Stadium	21,573	Recap
16	14	Sat, Sept 28	4:00 p.m. EDT	Edmonton Eskimos	L 16–21	3–11	TSN/RDS2	TD Place Stadium	23,451	Recap
17	Bye									
18	15	Fri, Oct 11	7:00 p.m. EDT	@ Toronto Argonauts	L 21–28	3–12	TSN/RDS2/ESPNews	BMO Field	10,368	Recap
19	16	Sat, Oct 19	4:00 p.m. EDT	@ Hamilton Tiger-Cats	L 12–33	3–13	TSN/RDS2	Tim Hortons Field	23,692	Recap
20	17	Sat, Oct 26	4:00 p.m. EDT	@ Toronto Argonauts	L 9–39	3–14	TSN/RDS	BMO Field	12,995	Recap
21	18	Fri, Nov 1	7:00 p.m. EDT	Montreal Alouettes	L 32–42	3–15	TSN/RDS	TD Place Stadium	24,592	Recap

# Games played with white uniforms.
# Games played with colour uniforms.

== Roster ==
2019 Ottawa Redblacks final roster
**Quarterbacks**: 8 Will Arndt; 4 Dominique Davis; 3 Jonathon Jennings; **Running backs**: 32 John Crockett; 25 Brendan Gillanders; 45 Anthony Gosselin; 5 Stefan Logan; 22 Greg Morris; **Receivers**: 19 Nate Behar; 89 Marco Dubois; 84 R. J. Harris; 80 Caleb Holley; 82 Wesley Lewis; 88 Brad Sinopoli; 83 Jerminic Smith; 85 Guillermo Villalobos	**Offensive linemen**: 51 Alex Fontana C; 53 Philippe Gagnon G; 64 Evan Johnson G/T; 65 Mark Korte G; 56 Alex Mateas C; 63 Stephane Nembot T; **Defensive linemen**: 98 Avery Ellis DE; 91 Darius Jackson DE; 49 Ettore Lattanzio DT; 90 Julien Laurent DT; 99 Kene Onyeka DE; 47 Nigel Romick DE; 92 George Uko DT; 75 Cameron Walker DE	**Linebackers**: 31 Kevin Brown; 24 Anthony Cioffi; 35 Jerod Fernandez; 43 Shaheed Salmon; **Defensive backs**: 27 Sherrod Baltimore; 20 Jean-Philippe Bolduc; 38 Brandin Dandridge; 2 Randall Evans; 37 DeAndre Farris; 21 Justin Howell; 6 Antoine Pruneau; 28 Corey Tindal	**Special teams**: 55 Mike Benson LS; 50 Louis-Philippe Bourassa LS; 13 Richie Leone P/K; 10 Lewis Ward K; **Practice roster**: 68 Kai Absheer T; 14 Rafael Araujo-Lopes SB; 87 Jaelan Austin WR; 30 Nate Hamlin DB; 33 Denzel Johnson DB; 16 José Maltos K/P; 52 Nick McBeath LB; 61 DeVondre Seymour T; 86 Micah Wright WR; **Suspended**: 67 Colin Buchanan T	**Injured list**: 46 Jean-Christophe Beaulieu FB; 48 Nicolas Boulay LB; 87 Seth Coate WR; 39 Mickael Côté LB; 17 DeVonte Dedmon SB; 30 Maurice Fleming DB; 29 Kevin Francis LB; 34 Gump Hayes DB; 93 Shaneil Jenkins DT; 94 Mike Klassen DT; 36 Jeff Knox LB; 58 Jason Lauzon-Séguin T; 66 Nolan MacMillan G; 23 Mossis Madu RB; 95 Danny Mason DE; 33 Kishawn McClain DB; 57 Andrew Pickett C/G; 7 Chris Randle DB; 15 Dominique Rhymes WR; 9 Jonathan Rose DB; 81 Jacob Scarfone WR; 44 J. R. Tavai DE; 96 Michael Wakefield DT; 42 Avery Williams LB; Italics indicate American player **Bold** indicates Global player

== Coaching staff ==
Ottawa Redblacks staff
Front office: Owner – Ottawa Sports and Entertainment Group (OSEG); President – Jeff Hunt; Chief executive officer – Bernie Ashe; General manager – Marcel Desjardins; Assistant general manager – Jeremy Snyder; Director of player personnel – Jean-Marc Edmé; Coordinator of football operations – Joey Swarbrick; Video coordinator – Colin Farquharson; Head coaches: Head coach – Rick Campbell; Offensive coaches: Receivers – Winston October; Offensive line – John McDonell; Quarterbacks – Beau Walker; Running backs – Joe Paopao	Defensive coaches: Defensive coordinator – Noel Thorpe; Defensive line – Leroy Blugh; Linebackers – Mark Nelson; Defensive assistant – Patrick Bourgon; Special teams coaches: Special teams coordinator – Bob Dyce; Strength and conditioning: Strength and conditioning coordinator – Nick Mercuri; → Coaching staff
