= 2014 Tampa Bay Buccaneers season =

39th season in franchise history; first with Mike Evans

- Owner: The Glazer family
- General manager: Jason Licht
- Head coach: Lovie Smith
- Home stadium: Raymond James Stadium

Results
- Record: 2–14
- Division place: 4th NFC South
- Playoffs: Did not qualify
- Pro Bowlers: DT Gerald McCoy

Uniform
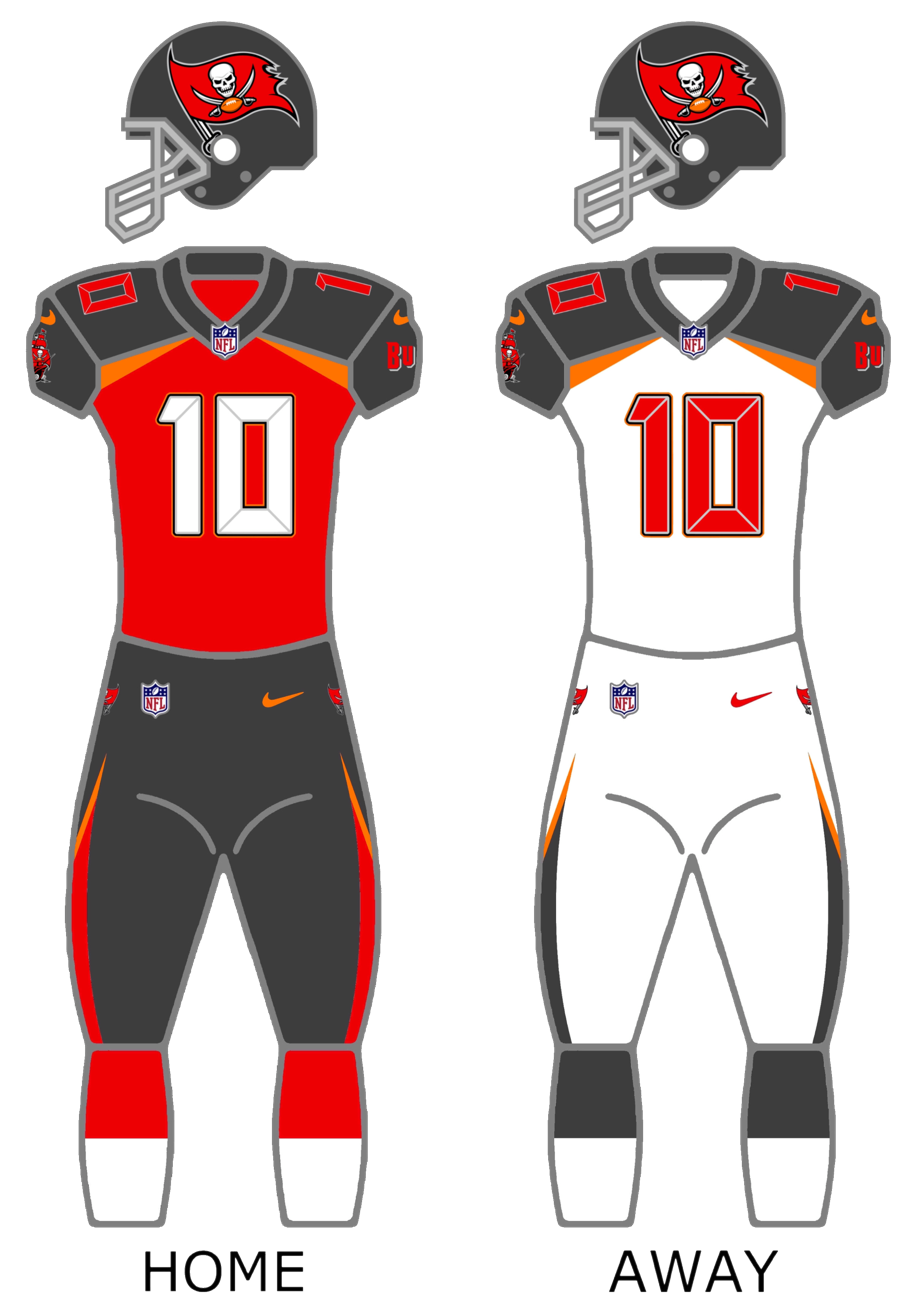

The 2014 season was the Tampa Bay Buccaneers' 39th in the National Football League (NFL). It was also the first season under head coach Lovie Smith, replacing Greg Schiano, who was fired at the end of the 2013 season, and under general manager Jason Licht, who replaced Mark Dominik after a disappointing 2013 season. It was the franchise's first season under new ownership since 1994, after longtime owner Malcolm Glazer died on May 28, 2014. Glazer's sons took over team operations.

The Buccaneers tried to improve their record of 4–12 of last season, but failed after tying their number of losses when they lost to Carolina in Week 15. Following a 2–14 record, their worst since 1986, the Buccaneers finished last overall in the NFC and tied with the Tennessee Titans for the worst record of the 2014 season, but was statistically (via a tiebreaker) last overall for the 2014 NFL season, thus earning the right to the first overall pick in the 2015 NFL draft. The Buccaneers did not win a single home game in 2014, going 0–2 during the preseason and 0–8 in the regular season at Raymond James Stadium. It was only the second time in franchise history, following their infamous 0–14 expansion team, that the Bucs did not win a home game during the season.

== 2014 draft class ==
2014 Tampa Bay Buccaneers draft
Round	Selection	Player	Position	College
1	7	Mike Evans	Wide receiver	Texas A&M
2	38	Austin Seferian-Jenkins	Tight end	Washington
3	69	Charles Sims	Running back	West Virginia
4	None — see draft trades below			
5	143	Kadeem Edwards	Guard	Tennessee State
5	149	Kevin Pamphile	Offensive tackle	Purdue
6	185	Robert Herron	Wide receiver	Wyoming
7	None — see draft trades below			

Draft trades

- The Buccaneers traded their fourth-round selection (No. 104 overall) along with their 2013 first-round selection (13th overall) to the New York Jets in exchange for cornerback Darrelle Revis on April 21, 2013.
- The Buccaneers traded their seventh-round selection (No. 221 overall) and a 2015 fifth-round selection to the Buffalo Bills in exchange for the Bills' 2014 fifth-round selection (No. 149 overall).
- The Buccaneers traded their original sixth-round selection (No. 183 overall) to the Chicago Bears in exchange for offensive tackle Gabe Carimi on June 9, 2013. The Buccaneers later acquired a new sixth-round selection (No. 185 overall) in a trade that sent wide receiver Mike Williams to the Buffalo Bills on April 4, 2014.

== Season summary ==
=== Offseason & preseason ===
Immediately after being named the new head coach, Lovie Smith began overhauling personnel. The primary goal was to reinstall the Tampa 2 defensive scheme that brought the club success during the late 1990s and early 2000s. Among the key cuts were Davin Joseph, and Darrelle Revis. Among the many new signings were quarterback Josh McCown, defensive end Michael Johnson and cornerback Alterraun Verner.

On August 26, the Buccaneers traded with New England for guard Logan Mankins. The Buccaneers finished the preseason only 1–3, but were still picked by some media members to be much-improved, and to even be a wild card contender.

=== September ===
The Buccaneers started the Lovie Smith Era off on a low note, losing on opening day to Carolina, then losing in the last minute to the Rams in week 2. In week three, the team was humiliated on a nationally televised Thursday night game, 56–14 to division rival Atlanta. Smith stated afterwards he was "embarrassed" by the performance, and said the loss was so terrible to the team, that it would "leave a scar."

One week later, Mike Glennon started at quarterback, and Buccaneers bounced back in a big way. Tampa Bay defeated Pittsburgh, their first win of the season, with a last-second go-ahead touchdown pass.

=== October ===
Tampa Bay went winless in October, with Mike Glennon at quarterback. Two overtime losses, and one blowout loss to Baltimore dropped the Buccaneers to 1–6.

=== November ===
Mike Glennon was benched after losing to Cleveland, and Josh McCown was back in at quarterback. Tampa Bay managed to win against the Redskins, with help from a breakout game from Mike Evans. Despite only two wins, the Buccaneers were still mathematically alive for the division title through the end of November due to the lackluster records of the NFC South teams.

=== December ===
Tampa Bay ended the season on a six-game losing streak, going winless in December, to finish the season 2–14. In the final game of the season against New Orleans, the Buccaneers blew a lead in the fourth quarter, sitting some of their starters in the second half. But by virtue of the loss, the Buccaneers mathematically clinched the first pick in the 2015 NFL Draft, beating out the Tennessee Titans (who also went 2–14).

== Staff ==
2014 Tampa Bay Buccaneers staff
Front office: Owner/president – Estate of Malcolm Glazer; Co-chairman – Bryan Glazer; Co-chairman – Edward Glazer; Co-chairman – Joel Glazer; General manager – Jason Licht; Director of player personnel – Jon Robinson; Director of football operations – Shelton Quarles; Director of pro scouting – Scott Cohen; Director of football administration – Mike Greenberg; Head coaches: Head coach – Lovie Smith; Offensive coaches: Offensive coordinator – Jeff Tedford; Quarterbacks – Marcus Arroyo; Running backs – Tim Spencer; Wide receivers – Andrew Hayes-Stoker; Tight ends – Jon Embree; Offensive line – George Warhop; Assistant offensive line – Matt Wiegand; Offensive quality control – Ben Steele	Defensive coaches: Defensive coordinator – Leslie Frazier; Defensive line – Joe Cullen; Assistant defensive line – Mike Phair; Linebackers – Hardy Nickerson; Cornerbacks – Gill Byrd; Safeties – Mikal Smith; Defensive quality control – Dave Borgonzi; Senior defensive assistant – Larry Marmie; Special teams coaches: Special teams coordinator – Kevin O'Dea; Assistant special teams – Carlos Polk; Strength and conditioning: Head strength and conditioning – Dave Kennedy

== Final roster ==
2014 Tampa Bay Buccaneers roster
Quarterbacks (QB): 8 Mike Glennon; 12 Josh McCown; Running backs (RB): 25 Mike James; 22 Doug Martin; 43 Bobby Rainey; 34 Charles Sims; Wide receivers (WR): 13 Mike Evans; 10 Robert Herron; 83 Vincent Jackson; 15 Tavarres King; 11 Solomon Patton; 89 Russell Shepard; Tight ends (TE): 84 Cameron Brate; 82 Brandon Myers; 86 Evan Rodriguez; 88 Luke Stocker	Offensive linemen (OL): 61 Josh Allen C; 73 Anthony Collins T; 75 Oniel Cousins G; 62 Evan Dietrich-Smith C; 69 Demar Dotson T; 72 Garrett Gilkey C; 70 Logan Mankins G; 66 Patrick Omameh G; 64 Kevin Pamphile T; Defensive linemen (DL): 91 Da'Quan Bowers DE; 57 Larry English DE; 96 T. J. Fatinikun DE; 92 William Gholston DE; 90 Michael Johnson DE; 98 Clinton McDonald DT; 77 Lawrence Sidbury DE; 56 Jacquies Smith DE; 97 Akeem Spence DT; 58 George Uko DT	Linebackers (LB): 54 Lavonte David OLB; 50 Dane Fletcher MLB; 59 Mason Foster MLB; 51 Danny Lansanah OLB; 45 Orie Lemon OLB; 52 Jason Williams OLB; Defensive backs (DB): 27 Johnthan Banks CB; 39 Brandon Dixon CB; 32 Isaiah Frey CB; 38 Dashon Goldson FS; 29 Leonard Johnson CB; 30 Bradley McDougald SS; 37 Keith Tandy FS; 21 Alterraun Verner CB; 41 C. J. Wilson CB; Special teams (ST): 48 Andrew DePaola LS; 9 Michael Koenen P; 7 Patrick Murray K	Practice squad: 44 Denicos Allen LB; 36 Derrius Brooks CB (PS/I); 35 Ka'Lial Glaud LB; 49 Jeremy Grable LB (PS/I); 26 Shelton Johnson S; 85 Chandler Jones WR; 3 Mike Kafka QB; 95 Matthew Masifilo DT; 78 Matt Patchan T; 23 Varmah Sonie CB; 60 Jeremiah Warren C; Reserve: 94 Adrian Clayborn DE (IR); 71 Kadeem Edwards G (IR); 24 Mike Jenkins CB (IR); 46 Jorvorskie Lane FB (IR); 53 Brandon Magee OLB (IR); 93 Gerald McCoy DT (IR); 18 Louis Murphy WR (IR); 87 Austin Seferian-Jenkins TE (IR); 31 Major Wright SS (IR); Rookies in italics 53 active, 11 reserve, 9 practice squad

== Schedule ==
=== Preseason ===
Week	Date	Opponent	Result	Record	Venue	Recap
1	August 8	at Jacksonville Jaguars	L 10–16	0–1	EverBank Field	Recap
2	August 16	Miami Dolphins	L 14–20	0–2	Raymond James Stadium	Recap
3	August 23	at Buffalo Bills	W 27–14	1–2	Ralph Wilson Stadium	Recap
4	August 28	Washington Redskins	L 10–24	1–3	Raymond James Stadium	Recap

=== Regular season ===
Week	Date	Opponent	Result	Record	Venue	Recap
1	September 7	Carolina Panthers	L 14–20	0–1	Raymond James Stadium	Recap
2	September 14	St. Louis Rams	L 17–19	0–2	Raymond James Stadium	Recap
3	September 18	at Atlanta Falcons	L 14–56	0–3	Georgia Dome	Recap
4	September 28	at Pittsburgh Steelers	W 27–24	1–3	Heinz Field	Recap
5	October 5	at New Orleans Saints	L 31–37 (OT)	1–4	Mercedes-Benz Superdome	Recap
6	October 12	Baltimore Ravens	L 17–48	1–5	Raymond James Stadium	Recap
7	Bye					
8	October 26	Minnesota Vikings	L 13–19 (OT)	1–6	Raymond James Stadium	Recap
9	November 2	at Cleveland Browns	L 17–22	1–7	FirstEnergy Stadium	Recap
10	November 9	Atlanta Falcons	L 17–27	1–8	Raymond James Stadium	Recap
11	November 16	at Washington Redskins	W 27–7	2–8	FedExField	Recap
12	November 23	at Chicago Bears	L 13–21	2–9	Soldier Field	Recap
13	November 30	Cincinnati Bengals	L 13–14	2–10	Raymond James Stadium	Recap
14	December 7	at Detroit Lions	L 17–34	2–11	Ford Field	Recap
15	December 14	at Carolina Panthers	L 17–19	2–12	Bank of America Stadium	Recap
16	December 21	Green Bay Packers	L 3–20	2–13	Raymond James Stadium	Recap
17	December 28	New Orleans Saints	L 20–23	2–14	Raymond James Stadium	Recap

=== Game summaries ===
==== Week 1: vs. Carolina Panthers ====
Week One: Carolina Panthers at Tampa Bay Buccaneers – Game summary

Quarter	1	2	3	4	Total
Panthers	0	10	0	10	20
Buccaneers	0	0	0	14	14

at Raymond James Stadium, Tampa, Florida

- Date: September 7
- Game time: 4:25 p.m. EDT
- Game weather: 88 °F (31 °C), cloudy
- Game attendance: 62,442
- Referee: Pete Morelli
- TV announcers (Fox): Chris Myers, Ronde Barber and Jennifer Hale
- Recap, Gamebook

Game information

First quarter

- No scoring plays

Second quarter

- CAR – Greg Olsen 5-yard pass from Derek Anderson, Graham Gano kick, 08:04 (CAR 7–0)
- CAR – Graham Gano 28-yard field goal, 00:05 (CAR 10–0)

Third quarter

- No scoring plays

Fourth quarter

- CAR – Kelvin Benjamin 26-yard pass from Derek Anderson, Graham Gano kick, 15:00 (CAR 17–0)
- TB – Chris Owusu 19-yard pass from Josh McCown, Patrick Murray kick, 07:30 (CAR 17–7)
- TB – Bobby Rainey 6-yard pass from Josh McCown, Patrick Murray kick, 02:11 (CAR 17–14)
- CAR – Graham Gano 33-yard field goal, 00:28 (CAR 20–14)

Top passers

- CAR – Derek Anderson, 24/34, 230 Yds, 2 TD
- TB – Josh McCown, 22/35, 183 Yds, 2 TD, 2 INT

Top rushers

- CAR – DeAngelo Williams, 14 Car, 72 Yds
- TB – Jorvorskie Lane, 1 Car, 54 Yds

Top receivers

- CAR – Kelvin Benjamin, 6 Rec, 92 Yds
- TB – Brandon Myers, 6 Rec, 41 Yds

Top tacklers

- CAR – Antoine Cason, 9 Solo
- TB – Lavonte David, 9 Solo, 1 Ast

The first game for new head coach Lovie Smith was against division rival Carolina. A lackluster first three quarters saw the Panthers run out to a 17–0 lead, with Derek Anderson making his first start since 2010 in place of an injured Cam Newton. In the fourth quarter, the Buccaneers rallied, scoring late two touchdowns, and trimming the lead to 17–14 with 2:06 remaining. The Bucs defense forced a 3 & Out, and Carolina punted, giving the ball back to the Bucs offense with just under two minutes to go. On the first play of the drive, however, Bobby Rainey's catch was fumbled away, and Carolina recovered.

==== Week 2: vs. St. Louis Rams ====
Week Two: St. Louis Rams at Tampa Bay Buccaneers – Game summary

Quarter	1	2	3	4	Total
Rams	7	3	3	6	19
Buccaneers	7	0	7	3	17

at Raymond James Stadium, Tampa, Florida

- Date: September 14
- Game time: 4:05 p.m. EDT
- Game weather: 88 °F (31 °C), cloudy
- Game attendance: 59,923
- Referee: Jeff Triplette
- TV announcers (Fox): Dick Stockton, Kirk Morrison and Kristina Pink
- Recap, Gamebook

Game information

First quarter

- TB – Josh McCown 5 yard run, Patrick Murray kick, 8:56 (TB 7–0)
- STL – Zac Stacy 2 yard run, Greg Zuerlein kick, 3:07 (Tied 7–7)

Second quarter

- STL – Greg Zuerlein 36 yard field goal, 0:39 (STL 10–7)

Third quarter

- TB – Josh McCown 1 yard run, Patrick Murray kick, 9:18 (TB 14–10)
- STL – Greg Zuerlein 35 yard field goal, 2:41 (TB 14–13)

Fourth quarter

- STL – Greg Zuerlein 46 yard field goal, 9:10 (STL 16–14)
- TB – Patrick Murray 36 yard field goal, 5:15 (TB 17–16)
- STL – Greg Zuerlein 38 yard field goal, 0:38 (STL 19–17)

Top passers

- STL – Austin Davis, 22/29, 235 Yds
- TB – Josh McCown, 16/21, 179 Yds, INT

Top rushers

- STL – Zac Stacy, 19 Car, 71 Yds, TD
- TB – Bobby Rainey, 22 Car, 144 Yds

Top receivers

- STL – Brian Quick, 7 Rec, 75 Yds
- TB – Vincent Jackson, 4 Rec, 51 Yds

Top tacklers

- STL – E.J. Gaines, 5 Solo
- TB – Dashon Goldson, 9 Solo, 2 Ast

St. Louis kicker Greg Zuerlein kicked a 38-yard field goal with 42 seconds remaining to take a 19–17 lead. On the ensuing drive, Tampa Bay quarterback Josh McCown completed a 19-yard pass to Bobby Rainey, then spiked the ball to stop the clock with 20 second left in regulation. McCown completed a 29-yard pass to Mike Evans at the St. Louis 32 yard line. As the team scurried to line up and spike the ball, A hesitant Evans was injured on the play. With no timeouts left, Tampa Bay was forced to accept a ten-second runoff penalty, and time expired. With the loss, the Buccaneers fell to 0-2. This was Tampa's last 0-2 start until 2026.

==== Week 3: at Atlanta Falcons ====
Week Three: Tampa Bay Buccaneers at Atlanta Falcons – Game summary

Quarter	1	2	3	4	Total
Buccaneers	0	0	0	14	14
Falcons	21	14	21	0	56

at Georgia Dome, Atlanta, Georgia

- Date: September 18
- Game time: 8:25 p.m. EDT
- Game weather: Played indoors (dome stadium)
- Game attendance: 70,318
- Referee: Craig Wrolstad
- TV announcers (CBS/NFLN): Jim Nantz, Phil Simms and Tracy Wolfson
- Recap, Gamebook

Game information

First quarter

- ATL – Harry Douglas 3 yard pass from Matt Ryan, Matt Bryant kick, 12:03 (ATL 7–0)
- ATL – Julio Jones 8 yard pass from Matt Ryan, Matt Bryant kick, 3:03 (ATL 14–0)
- ATL – Kemal Ishmael 23 yard interception return, Matt Bryant kick, 3:03 (ATL 21–0)

Second quarter

- ATL – Devin Hester 20 yard run, Matt Bryant kick, 14:53 (ATL 28–0)
- ATL – Devin Hester 62 yard punt return, Matt Bryant kick, 7:06 (ATL 35–0)

Third quarter

- ATL – Julio Jones 40 yard pass from Matt Ryan, Matt Bryant kick, 8:23 (ATL 42–0)
- ATL – Steven Jackson 2 yard run, Matt Bryant kick, 8:11 (ATL 49–0)
- ATL – Antone Smith 38 yard run, Matt Bryant kick, 1:47 (ATL 56–0)

Fourth quarter

- TB – Vincent Jackson 3 yard pass from Mike Glennon, Patrick Murray kick, 8:46 (ATL 56–7)
- TB – Danny Lansanah 27 yard interception return, Patrick Murray kick, 7:07 (ATL 56–14)

Top passers

- TB – Mike Glennon, 17/24, 121 Yds, TD
- ATL – Matt Ryan, 21/24, 286 Yds, 3 TD

Top rushers

- TB – Bobby Rainey, 11 Car, 41 Yds
- ATL – Steven Jackson, 11 Car, 54 Yds, TD

Top receivers

- TB – Bobby Rainey, 7 Rec, 64 Yds
- ATL – Julio Jones, 9 Rec, 161 Yds, 2 TD

Top tacklers

- TB – Lavonte David, 7 Solo, 1 Ast
- ATL – Robert McClain, 5 Solo, 2 Ast

Atlanta throttled the Buccaneers by the score of 56–14, tied for the second-most lopsided defeat in franchise history. The Falcons jumped out to a 56–0 lead by the third quarter, including Devin Hester's NFL-record 19th return touchdown. In the first half alone, the Falcons forced three turnovers, and held Tampa Bay to 63 yards offense and only two first downs. This was the first NFC vs. NFC game to air on CBS since the 1993 NFL season.

==== Week 4: at Pittsburgh Steelers ====
Week Four: Tampa Bay Buccaneers at Pittsburgh Steelers – Game summary

Quarter	1	2	3	4	Total
Buccaneers	10	0	7	10	27
Steelers	10	7	7	0	24

at Heinz Field, Pittsburgh, Pennsylvania

- Date: September 28
- Game time: 1:00 p.m. EDT
- Game weather: 74 °F (23 °C), partly cloudy
- Game attendance: 62,910
- Referee: Walt Anderson
- TV announcers (Fox): Thom Brennaman, David Diehl and Laura Okmin
- Recap, Gamebook

Game information

First quarter

- TB – Mike Evans 7 yards pass from Mike Glennon, Patrick Murray kick, 13:01 (TB 7–0)
- TB – Patrick Murray 50 yard field goal, 10:01 (TB 10–0)
- PIT – Shaun Suisham 25 yard field goal, 6:19 (TB 10–3)
- PIT – Antonio Brown 11 yard pass from Ben Roethlisberger, Shaun Suisham kick, 0:15 (Tied 10–10)

Second quarter

- PIT – Antonio Brown 27 yard pass from Ben Roethlisberger, Shaun Suisham kick, 4:58 (PIT 17–10)

Third quarter

- TB – Doug Martin 3 yard rush, Patrick Murray kick, 12:27 (Tied 17–17)
- PIT – Heath Miller 5 yard pass from Ben Roethlisberger, Shaun Suisham kick, 7:50 (PIT 24–17)

Fourth quarter

- TB – Patrick Murray 27 yard field goal, 11:37 (PIT 24–20)
- TB – Vincent Jackson 5 yard pass from Mike Glennon, Patrick Murray kick, 0:07 (TB 27–24)

Top passers

- TB – Mike Glennon, 21/42, 302 Yds, 2 TD, INT
- PIT – Ben Roethlisberger, 29/40, 314 Yds, 3 TD

Top rushers

- TB – Doug Martin, 13 Car, 40 Yds, TD
- PIT – Le'Veon Bell, 19 Car, 63 Yds

Top receivers

- TB – Louis Murphy, 6 Rec, 99 Yds
- PIT – Antonio Brown, 7 Rec, 131 Yds, 2 TD

Top tacklers

- TB – Lavonte David, 10 Solo, 2 Ast
- PIT – Lawrence Timmons, 6 Solo, 3 Ast

Tampa Bay won their first game of the season, as well as the first win for new head coach Lovie Smith. One week after a humiliating loss at Atlanta, the Buccaneers bounced back, and upset the Steelers, the first win in franchise history at Pittsburgh. Trailing 24–20 just inside the two-minute warning, Tampa Bay drove to the Pittsburgh 14 yard line. The Steelers forced a turnover on downs, and took over at their own 14. The Tampa Bay defense held the Steelers to a 3 and out, and forced a punt with 50 seconds left in regulation. Brad Wing's punt was high and short, and was downed inside Pittsburgh territory on the 46. Two plays later Mike Glennon, connected to Louis Murphy, who broke free for a 41-yard gain all the way to the 5 yard line. With 7 seconds left, Glennon completed the game-winning touchdown pass to Vincent Jackson in the left corner of the endzone.

It was the Buccaneers' first win against the Steelers since 1998.

==== Week 5: at New Orleans Saints ====
Week Five: Tampa Bay Buccaneers at New Orleans Saints – Game summary

Quarter	1	2	3	4	OT	Total
Buccaneers	0	10	14	7	0	31
Saints	6	7	7	11	6	37

at Mercedes-Benz Superdome, New Orleans, Louisiana

- Date: October 5
- Game time: 1:00 p.m. EDT/12:00 p.m. CDT
- Game weather: Played indoors (dome stadium)
- Game attendance: 73,004
- Referee: Carl Cheffers
- TV announcers (Fox): Dick Stockton, Kirk Morrison and Kristina Pink
- Recap, Gamebook

Game information

First quarter

- NO – Shayne Graham 30 yard field goal, 9:46 (NO 3-0)
- NO – Shayne Graham 29 yard field goal, 0:21 (NO 6-0)

Second quarter

- NO – Pierre Thomas 15 yard pass from Drew Brees, Shayne Graham kick, 10:14 (NO 13-0)
- TB – Patrick Murray 55 yard field goal, 1:54 (NO 13-3)
- TB – Louis Murphy 20 yard pass from Mike Glennon, Patrick Murray kick, 0:20 (NO 13-10)

Third quarter

- TB – Bobby Rainey 9 yard rush, Patrick Murray kick, 11:59 (TB 17–13)
- TB – Danny Lansanah 33 yard interception return, Patrick Murray kick, 11:20 (TB 24–13)
- NO – Travaris Cadet 5 yard pass from Drew Brees, Shayne Graham kick, 4:57 (TB 24–20)

Fourth quarter

- TB – Robert Herron 9 yard pass from Mike Glennon, Patrick Murray kick, 13:28 (TB 31–20)
- NO – Pierre Thomas 27 yard rush, pass failed, 9:28 (TB 31–26)
- NO – Safety, Mike Glennon sacked in end zone by Junior Galette, 6:44 (TB 31–28)
- NO – Shayne Graham 44 yard field goal, 2:30 (Tied 31–31)

Overtime

- NO – Khiry Robinson 18 yard rush, 9:24, (NO 37-31)

Top passers

- TB – Mike Glennon, 19/32, 249 Yds, 2 TD, INT
- NO – Drew Brees, 35/57, 371 Yds, 2 TD, 3 INT

Top rushers

- TB – Doug Martin, 14 Att, 45 yds
- NO – Khiry Robinson, 21 Att, 89 Yds, TD

Top receivers

- TB – Vincent Jackson 8 Rec, 144 Yds
- NO – Pierre Thomas, 8 Rec, 77 Yds, TD

Top tacklers

- TB – Lavonte David, 10 Solo, 4 Ast, 2 TFL
- NO – Rafael Bush, 4 Solo, 2 Ast

Mike Glennon passed for 249 yards and two touchdown passes, as the Buccaneers led the Saints 31–20 in the fourth quarter. New Orleans rallied to tie the game and force overtime. The Saints won the coin toss in overtime, and proceeded to score a touchdown on the first possession to win the game.

==== Week 6: vs. Baltimore Ravens ====
Week Six: Baltimore Ravens at Tampa Bay Buccaneers – Game summary

Quarter	1	2	3	4	Total
Ravens	28	10	7	3	48
Buccaneers	0	0	10	7	17

at Raymond James Stadium, Tampa, Florida

- Date: October 12
- Game time: 1:00 p.m. EDT
- Game weather: 84 °F (29 °C), cloudy
- Game attendance: 60,041
- Referee: Jerome Boger
- TV announcers (CBS): Spero Dedes, Solomon Wilcots and Chris Fischer
- Recap, Gamebook

Game information

First quarter

- BAL – Torrey Smith 15 yard pass from Joe Flacco, Justin Tucker kick, 13:11 (BAL 7–0)
- BAL – Torrey Smith 9 yard pass from Joe Flacco, Justin Tucker kick, 9:22 (BAL 14–0)
- BAL – Kamar Aiken 17 yard pass from Joe Flacco, Justin Tucker kick, 5:00 (BAL 21–0)
- BAL – Michael Campanaro 19 yard pass from Joe Flacco, Justin Tucker kick, 0:01 (BAL 28–0)

Second quarter

- BAL – Steve Smith 56 yard pass from Joe Flacco, Justin Tucker kick, 13:57 (BAL 35–0)
- BAL – Justin Tucker 46 yard field goal, 8:41 (BAL 38–0)

Third quarter

- TB – Patrick Murray 47 yard field goal, 10:50 (BAL 38–3)
- TB – Mike Evans 17 yard pass from Mike Glennon, Patrick Murray kick, 5:46 (BAL 38–10)
- BAL – Bernard Pierce 4 yard rush, Justin Tucker kick, 0:07 (BAL 45–10)

Fourth quarter

- TB – Louis Murphy 3 yard pass from Mike Glennon, Patrick Murray kick, 12:19 (BAL 45–17)
- BAL – Justin Tucker 49 yard field goal, 7:53 (BAL 48–17)

Top passers

- BAL – Joe Flacco, 21/28, 306 Yds, 5 TD
- TB – Mike Glennon, 24/44, 314 Yds, 2 TD, INT

Top rushers

- BAL – Justin Forsett, 14 Att, 111 Yds
- TB – Doug Martin, 11 Att, 45 Yds

Top receivers

- BAL – Steve Smith, 5 Rec, 110 Yds, TD
- TB – Louis Murphy, 7 Rec, 72 Yds, TD

Top tacklers

- BAL – C.J. Mosley, 6 Solo, 2 Ast
- TB – Lavonte David, 10 Solo, 4 Ast, 1 TFL

Ravens quarterback Joe Flacco threw five touchdown passes in the first 17 minutes of regulation (setting a new NFL record), as Baltimore jumped out to a 38–0 halftime lead (also an NFL record for a road team). The Ravens handed Tampa Bay their second dominating loss of the season.

==== Week 8: vs. Minnesota Vikings ====
Week Eight: Minnesota Vikings at Tampa Bay Buccaneers – Game summary

Quarter	1	2	3	4	OT	Total
Vikings	0	3	7	3	6	19
Buccaneers	0	0	0	13	0	13

at Raymond James Stadium, Tampa, Florida

- Date: October 26
- Game time: 1:00 p.m. EDT
- Game weather: 77 °F (25 °C), sunny
- Game attendance: 56,577
- Referee: Craig Wrolstad
- TV announcers (Fox): Justin Kutcher, David Diehl and Laura Okmin
- Recap, Gamebook

Game information

First quarter Second quarter

- MIN – Blair Walsh 46 yard field goal, 0:00 (MIN 3–0)

Third quarter

- MIN – Greg Jennings 17 yard pass from Teddy Bridgewater, Blair Walsh kick, 7:09 (MIN 10–0)

Fourth quarter

- TB – Patrick Murray 54 yard field goal, 14:12 (MIN 10–3)
- TB – Patrick Murray 45 yard field goal, 7:19 (MIN 10–6)
- TB – Austin Seferian-Jenkins 7 yard pass from Mike Glennon, Patrick Murray kick, 2:02 (TB 13–10)
- MIN – Blair Walsh 39 yard field goal, 0:00 (Tied 13–13)

Overtime

- MIN – Anthony Barr 27 yard defensive fumble return (MIN 19–13)

Top passers

- MIN – Teddy Bridgewater, 24/42, 241 Yds, TD
- TB – Mike Glennon, 19/28, 171 Yds, TD, INT

Top rushers

- MIN – Jerick McKinnon, 16 Att, 83 Yds
- TB – Doug Martin, 10 Att, 27 Yds

Top receivers

- MIN – Cordarrelle Patterson, 6 Rec, 86 Yds
- TB – Mike Evans, 4 Rec, 78 Yds

Top tacklers

- MIN – Chad Greenway, 6 Solo, 3 Ast
- TB – Lavonte David, 9 Solo, 5 Ast, 3 TFL

Offensive futility plagued both teams in the first half, with Minnesota kicking a field goal as time expired in the second quarter to take a 3–0 lead into halftime. Trailing 10–6 in the fourth quarter, Mike Glennon threw a 7-yard touchdown pass to Austin Seferian-Jenkins with 2:02 remaining in regulation. The Buccaneers briefly took a 13–10 lead, but the Vikings were able to tie the game at 13–13 and force overtime.

In the overtime period, Tampa Bay won the coin toss and received. On the first play from scrimmage in overtime, Austin Seferian-Jenkins caught a 10-yard pass at the 27 yard line, but fumbled the ball as he was tackled. Anthony Barr scooped up the ball and returned it 27 yards for a touchdown, and Minnesota won 19–13.

==== Week 9: at Cleveland Browns ====
Week Nine: Tampa Bay Buccaneers at Cleveland Browns – Game summary

Quarter	1	2	3	4	Total
Buccaneers	0	10	7	0	17
Browns	3	6	7	6	22

at FirstEnergy Stadium, Cleveland, Ohio

- Date: November 2
- Game time: 1:00 p.m. EST
- Game weather: 42 °F (6 °C), cloudy
- Game attendance: 67,431
- Referee: Terry McAulay
- TV announcers (Fox): Thom Brennaman, David Diehl and Laura Okmin
- Recap, Gamebook

Game information

First quarter

- CLE – Billy Cundiff 49 yard field goal, 5:59, (CLE 3–0)

Second quarter

- CLE – Billy Cundiff 29 yard field goal (CLE 6–0)
- TB – Mike Evans 24 yard pass from Mike Glennon, Patrick Murray, 8:44 (TB 7–6)
- TB – Patrick Murray 40 yard field goal, 2:25 (TB 10–6)
- CLE – Billy Cundiff 43 yard field goal, 0:00 (TB 10–9)

Third quarter

- CLE – Terrance West 2 yard pass from Brian Hoyer, Billy Cundiff kick, 9:10 (CLE 16–10)
- TB – Mike Evans 24 yard pass from Mike Glennon, Patrick Murray kick, 2:49 (TB 17–16)

Fourth quarter

- CLE – Taylor Gabriel 34 yard pass from Brian Hoyer, pass failed, 8:59 (CLE 22–17)

Top passers

- TB – Mike Glennon, 17/33, 260 Yds, 2 TD, 2 INT
- CLE – Brian Hoyer, 21/34, 330 Yds, 2 TD, 2 INT

Top rushers

- TB – Bobby Rainey, 19 Att, 87 Yds
- CLE – Terrance West, 15 Att, 48 Yds

Top receivers

- TB – Mike Evans, 7 Rec, 124 Yds, 2 TD
- CLE – Taylor Gabriel, 5 Rec, 87 Yds, TD

Top tacklers

- TB – Major Wright, 7 Solo, 6 Ast, TFL
- CLE – Buster Skrine, 7 Solo, 2 Ast

Mike Evans caught two touchdown passes from Mike Glennon, as Tampa Bay led 17–16 in the fourth quarter. Cleveland scored with 8:59 remaining in regulation, and won the game by the score of 22–17. In the final two minutes, Tampa Bay drove to the Cleveland 28 yard line, but an offensive pass interference penalty pushed them back to the 47. Facing 4th & 11, Glennon's pass was incomplete, and the Browns defeated Tampa Bay for the first time since 1995.

==== Week 10: vs. Atlanta Falcons ====
Week Ten: Atlanta Falcons at Tampa Bay Buccaneers – Game summary

Quarter	1	2	3	4	Total
Falcons	7	6	3	11	27
Buccaneers	3	7	0	7	17

at Raymond James Stadium, Tampa, Florida

- Date: November 9
- Game time: 1:00 p.m. EST
- Game weather: 64 °F (18 °C), cloudy
- Game attendance: 57,751
- Referee: Clete Blakeman
- TV announcers (Fox): Thom Brennaman, David Diehl and Laura Okmin
- Recap, Gamebook

Game information

First quarter

- TB – Patrick Murray 51 yard field goal, 6:24 (TB 3–0)
- ATL – Steven Jackson 1 yard rush, Matt Bryant kick, 0:51 (ATL 7–3)

Second quarter

- ATL – Matt Bryant 37 yard field goal, 7:09 (ATL 10–3)
- TB – Mike Evans 22 yard pass from Josh McCown, Patrick Murray kick, 0:46 (Tied 10–10)
- ATL – Matt Bryant 43 yard field goal, 0:00 (ATL 13–10)

Third quarter

- ATL – Matt Bryant 44 yard field goal, 10:23 (ATL 16–10)

Fourth quarter

- TB Austin Seferian-Jenkins 1 yard pass from Josh McCown, Patrick Murray kick, 14:18 (TB 17–16)
- ATL – Roddy White 5 yard pass from Matt Ryan, Harry Douglas pass from Matt Ryan, 9:18 (ATL 24–17)
- ATL – Matt Bryant 33 yard field goal, 4:10 (ATL 27–17)

Top passers

- ATL – Matt Ryan, 20/31, 219 Yds, TD
- TB – Josh McCown, 27/43, 301 Yds, 2 TD, 2 INT

Top rushers

- ATL – Steven Jackson, 16 Att, 81 Yds, TD
- TB – Josh McCown, 5 Att, 39 Yds

Top receivers

- ATL – Julio Jones, 8 Rec, 119 Yds
- TB – Mike Evans, 7 Rec, 125 Yds, TD

Top tacklers

- ATL – Paul Worrilow,8 Solo, 2 Ast
- TB – Lavonte David, 10 Solo, 4 Ast

Josh McCown returned as the starting quarterback for Tampa Bay. The Buccaneers led 17–16, but Atlanta scored a go-ahead touchdown early in the fourth quarter and held on for the win. In the final two minutes, Tampa Bay drove to the Atlanta 4 yard line, but McCown's pass to Vincent Jackson was tipped and intercepted in the endzone, sealing the game for Atlanta.

==== Week 11: at Washington Redskins ====
Week Eleven: Tampa Bay Buccaneers at Washington Redskins – Game summary

Quarter	1	2	3	4	Total
Buccaneers	10	3	7	7	27
Redskins	0	7	0	0	7

at FedExField, Landover, Maryland

- Date: November 16
- Game time: 1:00 p.m. EST
- Game weather: 45 °F (7 °C), cloudy
- Game attendance: 77,442
- Referee: Bill Vinovich
- TV announcers (Fox): Dick Stockton, Kirk Morrison and Kristina Pink
- Recap, Gamebook

Game information

First quarter

- TB – Patrick Murray 32 yard field goal, 11:10 (TB 3–0)
- TB – Johnthan Banks 19 yard interception return, Patrick Murray kick, 3:56 (TB 10–0)

Second quarter

- TB – Patrick Murray 38 yard field goal, 7:39 (TB 13–0)
- WAS – Roy Helu 30 yard pass from Robert Griffin III, Kai Forbath kick, 0:11 (TB 13–7)

Third quarter

- TB – Mike Evans 36 yard pass from Josh McCown, Patrick Murray kick, 4:36 (TB 20–7)

Fourth quarter

- TB – Mike Evans 56 yard pass from Josh McCown, Patrick Murray, 14:07 (TB 27–7)

Top passers

- TB – Josh McCown, 15/23, 288 Yds, 2 TD
- WAS – Robert Griffin III, 23/32, 207 Yds, TD, 2 INT

Top rushers

- TB – Charles Sims, 13 Att, 36 Yds
- WAS – Alfred Morris, 20 Att, 96 Yds

Top receivers

- TB – Mike Evans, 7 Rec, 209 Yds, 2 TD
- WAS – Roy Helu, 6 Rec, 57 Yds, TD

Top tacklers

- TB – Lavonte David, 8 Solo, 5 Ast
- WAS – David Amerson, 3 Solo, 2 Ast

Mike Evans had a breakout game, catching 7 passes for 209 yards and two touchdowns (36 yards and 56 yards, respectively). Tampa Bay won their second game of the season.

==== Week 12: at Chicago Bears ====
Week Twelve: Tampa Bay Buccaneers at Chicago Bears – Game summary

Quarter	1	2	3	4	Total
Buccaneers	0	10	0	3	13
Bears	0	0	21	0	21

at Soldier Field, Chicago, Illinois

- Date: November 23
- Game time: 1:00 p.m. EST/12:00 p.m. CST
- Game weather: 54 °F (12 °C), cloudy
- Game attendance: 61,109
- Referee: Walt Coleman
- TV announcers (Fox): Thom Brennaman, David Diehl and Laura Okmin
- Recap, Gamebook

Game information

First quarter

- No Scoring

Second quarter

- TB – Mike Evans 19 yard pass from Josh McCown, Patrick Murray kick, 13:24 (TB 7–0)
- TB – Patrick Murray 32 yard field goal, 0:04 (TB 10–0)

Third quarter

- CHI – Alshon Jeffery 2 yard pass from Jay Cutler, Robbie Gould kick, 10:33 (TB 10–7)
- CHI – Matt Forte 13 yard rush, Robbie Gould kick, 4:51 (CHI 14–10)
- CHI – Matt Forte 1 yard rush, Robbie Gould kick, 3:02 (CHI 21–10)

Fourth quarter

- TB – Patrick Murray 39 yard field goal, 4:56 (CHI 21–13)

Top passers

- TB – Josh McCown, 25/38, 341 Yds, TD, 2 INT
- CHI – Jay Cutler, 17/27, 130 Yds, TD

Top rushers

- TB – Doug Martin, 11 Att, 27 Yds
- CHI – Matt Forte, 23 Att, 89 Yds, 2 TD

Top receivers

- TB – Vincent Jackson, 5 Rec, 117 Yds
- CHI – Martellus Bennett, 4 Rec, 37 Yds

Top tacklers

- TB – Mason Foster, 7 Solo, Ast
- CHI – Ryan Mundy, 6 Solo, 2 Ast

The Buccaneers blew a 10–0 halftime lead with three turnovers in the third quarter. The Bears scored two touchdowns off of turnovers, and a total of 21 points in the third quarter to take the lead and the win. This was head coach Lovie Smith's first return to Chicago since the Bears fired him following the 2012 season.

==== Week 13: vs. Cincinnati Bengals ====
Week Thirteen: Cincinnati Bengals at Tampa Bay Buccaneers – Game summary

Quarter	1	2	3	4	Total
Bengals	0	7	7	0	14
Buccaneers	3	7	0	3	13

at Raymond James Stadium, Tampa, Florida

- Date: November 30
- Game time: 1:00 p.m. EST
- Game weather: 77 °F (25 °C), sunny
- Game attendance: 56,340
- Referee: Bill Leavy
- TV announcers (CBS): Spero Dedes, Solomon Wilcots and Chris Fischer
- Recap, Gamebook

Game information

First quarter

Second quarter

Third quarter

Fourth quarter

Top passers

- CIN –
- TB –

Top rushers

- CIN –
- TB –

Top receivers

- CIN –
- TB –

Top tacklers

- CIN –
- TB –

Trailing 14–13 in the closing seconds, Tampa Bay completed a 21-yard pass to the Bengals 20 yard line, but a replay showed they had 12 men on the field for the play. The penalty took the Buccaneers out of field goal range.

==== Week 14: at Detroit Lions ====
Week Fourteen: Tampa Bay Buccaneers at Detroit Lions – Game summary

Quarter	1	2	3	4	Total
Buccaneers	0	10	0	7	17
Lions	7	10	10	7	34

at Ford Field, Detroit, Michigan

- Date: December 7
- Game time: 1:00 p.m. EST
- Game weather: Played indoors (dome stadium)
- Game attendance: 61,489
- Referee: Jeff Triplette
- TV announcers (Fox): Dick Stockton, Brady Quinn and Kristina Pink
- Recap, Gamebook

Game information

First quarter

Second quarter

Third quarter

Fourth quarter

Top passers

- TB –
- DET –

Top rushers

- TB –
- DET –

Top receivers

- TB –
- DET –

Top tacklers

- TB –
- DET –

==== Week 15: at Carolina Panthers ====
Week Fifteen: Tampa Bay Buccaneers at Carolina Panthers – Game summary

Quarter	1	2	3	4	Total
Buccaneers	7	3	0	7	17
Panthers	6	3	7	3	19

at Bank of America Stadium, Charlotte, North Carolina

- Date: December 14
- Game time: 1:00 p.m. EST
- Game weather: 60 °F (16 °C), sunny
- Game attendance: 72,842
- Referee: Ron Torbert
- TV announcers (Fox): Dick Stockton, Kirk Morrison and Kristina Pink
- Recap, Gamebook

Game information

First quarter Second quarter Third quarter Fourth quarter

Top passers

- TB –
- CAR –

Top rushers

- TB –
- CAR –

Top receivers

- TB –
- CAR –

Top tacklers

- TB –
- CAR –

Like the meeting in week 1, Panthers quarterback Cam Newton was on the sidelines, this time due to injuries suffered in a car accident. Carolina swept the Buccaneers, using backup quarterbacks in both games.

==== Week 16: vs. Green Bay Packers ====
Week Sixteen: Green Bay Packers at Tampa Bay Buccaneers – Game summary

Quarter	1	2	3	4	Total
Packers	7	3	0	10	20
Buccaneers	0	3	0	0	3

at Raymond James Stadium, Tampa, Florida

- Date: December 21
- Game time: 1:00 p.m. EST
- Game weather: 75 °F (24 °C), cloudy
- Game attendance: 64,247
- Referee: Terry McAulay
- TV announcers (Fox): Chris Myers, Ronde Barber and Jennifer Hale
- Recap, Gamebook

Game information

First quarter

Second quarter

Third quarter

Fourth quarter

Top passers

- GB –
- TB –

Top rushers

- GB –
- TB –

Top receivers

- GB –
- TB –

Top tacklers

- GB –
- TB –

==== Week 17: vs. New Orleans Saints ====
Week Seventeen: New Orleans Saints at Tampa Bay Buccaneers – Game summary

Quarter	1	2	3	4	Total
Saints	0	7	0	16	23
Buccaneers	3	17	0	0	20

at Raymond James Stadium, Tampa, Florida

- Date: December 28
- Game time: 1:00 p.m. EST
- Game weather: 79 °F (26 °C), cloudy
- Game attendance: 59,952
- Referee: Brad Allen
- TV announcers (Fox): Sam Rosen, Kirk Morrison and Peter Schrager
- Recap, Gamebook

Game information

First quarter

Second quarter

Third quarter

Fourth quarter

Top passers

- NO –
- TB –

Top rushers

- NO –
- TB –

Top receivers

- NO –
- TB –

Top tacklers

- NO –
- TB –

Tampa Bay took a 20–7 lead into halftime, but New Orleans rallied for the victory. Drew Brees threw a 36-yard touchdown pass to Marques Colston with 1:57 remaining. On the ensuing drive, the Saints defense sacked Josh McCown for a safety, and secured a 23–20 victory. The Saints swept Tampa Bay for the third straight season, and won their seventh overall in the rivalry. The Buccaneers, finishing 2–14, clinched the first pick in the 2015 NFL draft.

== Standings ==
=== Division ===
NFC South
	W	L	T	PCT	DIV	CONF	PF	PA	STK
^{(4)} Carolina Panthers	7	8	1	.469	4–2	6–6	339	374	W4
New Orleans Saints	7	9	0	.438	3–3	6–6	401	424	W1
Atlanta Falcons	6	10	0	.375	5–1	6–6	381	417	L1
Tampa Bay Buccaneers	2	14	0	.125	0–6	1–11	277	410	L6

=== Conference ===
NFC
#	Team	Division	W	L	T	PCT	DIV	CONF	SOS	SOV	STK
Division leaders
1 (Note: Seattle, Green Bay and Dallas were ranked in seeds 1–3 based on conference record.)	Seattle Seahawks	West	12	4	0	.750	5–1	10–2	.525	.513	W6
2	Green Bay Packers	North	12	4	0	.750	5–1	9–3	.482	.440	W2
3	Dallas Cowboys	East	12	4	0	.750	4–2	8–4	.445	.422	W4
4	Carolina Panthers	South	7	8	1	.469	4–2	6–6	.490	.357	W4
Wild Cards
5 (Note: Arizona defeated Detroit head-to-head (Week 11, 14–6).)	Arizona Cardinals	West	11	5	0	.688	3–3	8–4	.523	.477	L2
6	Detroit Lions	North	11	5	0	.688	5–1	9–3	.471	.392	L1
Did not qualify for the postseason
7	Philadelphia Eagles	East	10	6	0	.625	4–2	6–6	.490	.416	W1
8	San Francisco 49ers	West	8	8	0	.500	2–4	7–5	.527	.508	W1
9 (Note: New Orleans defeated Minnesota head-to-head (Week 3, 20–9).)	New Orleans Saints	South	7	9	0	.438	3–3	6–6	.486	.415	W1
10	Minnesota Vikings	North	7	9	0	.438	1–5	6–6	.475	.308	W1
11 (Note: The NY Giants defeated both Atlanta and St. Louis head-to-head (Atlanta: Week 5, 30–20; St. Louis: Week 16, 37–27), while Atlanta finished ahead of St. Louis based on conference record.)	New York Giants	East	6	10	0	.375	2–4	4–8	.512	.323	L1
12	Atlanta Falcons	South	6	10	0	.375	5–1	6–6	.482	.380	L1
13	St. Louis Rams	West	6	10	0	.375	2–4	4–8	.531	.427	L3
14	Chicago Bears	North	5	11	0	.313	1–5	4–8	.529	.338	L5
15	Washington Redskins	East	4	12	0	.250	2–4	2–10	.496	.422	L1
16	Tampa Bay Buccaneers	South	2	14	0	.125	0–6	1–11	.486	.469	L6
Tiebreakers (Note: When breaking ties for three or more teams under the NFL's rules, they are first broken within divisions, then comparing only the highest-ranked remaining team from each division.)
