= 1952 IRFU college draft =

Unofficial Canadian football draft

The 1952 IRFU college draft was an unofficial sports draft held by the Interprovincial Rugby Football Union, a predecessor of the East Division of the Canadian Football League, in the spring of 1952. The concept was first developed at a meeting between Eastern officials on April 6, 1952. In the meeting, the delegates agreed, in principle, that eligible University athletes would be selected by member clubs with the last place team selecting first in each round. While the draft was unofficial, players selected in this draft were indeed added to the rosters of the clubs that had drafted them.

Seventeen players were chosen from among eligible players from five eastern universities, McGill University, Queen's University, University of Toronto, University of Western Ontario, and McMaster University. The Montreal Alouettes had the first selection, as well as the most, since they also had the last selection.

== Round one ==
Pick #	CFL team	Player	Position	University
1	Montreal Alouettes	Harry Lampman	E	Queen's
2	Toronto Argonauts	Marsh Haymes	G	Toronto
3	Hamilton Tiger-Cats	Bill Berezowski	C/G	McMaster
4	Ottawa Rough Riders	Bob Garside	HB	Toronto

== Round two ==
Pick #	CFL team	Player	Position	University
5	Montreal Alouettes	Dawson Tilley	G/T	McGill
6	Toronto Argonauts	Al Dancey	C	Toronto
7	Hamilton Tiger-Cats	Mel Hawkrigg	HB	McMaster
8	Ottawa Rough Riders	Walt Bashak	G/T	McMaster

== Round three ==
Pick #	CFL team	Player	Position	University
9	Montreal Alouettes	Gene Robillard	HB/QB	McGill
10	Toronto Argonauts	Ross McKelvey	HB	Queen's
11	Hamilton Tiger-Cats	Bob McMonagle	HB	Western Ontario
12	Ottawa Rough Riders	Alex Lawson	E/QB	Toronto

== Round four ==
Pick #	CFL team	Player	Position	University
13	Montreal Alouettes	Bob McLelland	G/T	McGill
14	Toronto Argonauts	Jack Roberts	G/T	Toronto
15	Hamilton Tiger-Cats	Gerry Fitzgerald	E	Western Ontario
16	Ottawa Rough Riders	Al Brown	E	Toronto
17	Montreal Alouettes	Ken Wagner	HB	McGill
