= Lampman (surname) =

Lampman is a surname. Notable people with this surname include:

- Archibald Lampman (1861–1899), Canadian poet
  - Archibald Lampman Award, an award named after Archibald Lampman
- Bryce Lampman (born 1982), American ice hockey player
- Ben Hur Lampman (1886–1954), American newspaper editor
- Harry Lampman (1927–2018), Canadian football player
- Jake Lampman (born 1993), American football player
- Mike Lampman (born 1950), Canadian-born American ice hockey player
- Robert Lampman (1920–1997), American economist

== See also ==
- Lampman, a city in Saskatchewan, Canada
  - Lampman Airport, an airport in Lampman
  - Lampman/Spitfire Air Aerodrome, an aerodrome in Lampman
- Ronald Lampman Watts, Canadian academic
- William Lampman House, a house in Catskill, New York
