= 1954 IRFU college draft =

Second sports draft by the Interprovincial Rugby Football Union

The 1954 IRFU college draft was the second official sports draft held by the Interprovincial Rugby Football Union, a predecessor of the East Division of the Canadian Football League, in the spring of 1954. 32 players were chosen from among eligible players from five eastern universities, McGill University, Queen's University, University of Toronto, University of Western Ontario, and McMaster University. The Toronto Argonauts had the first selection, Bill McFarlane, in a draft where only six players would ever play in a professional football game.

The following list only includes the first three rounds due to historical limitations.

== Round one ==
Pick #	CFL team	Player	Position	University
1	Toronto Argonauts	Bill McFarlane	HB	Toronto
2	Ottawa Rough Riders	George Klein	HB	McGill
3	Montreal Alouettes	Don Mattason	G	Toronto
4	Hamilton Tiger-Cats	Steve Oneschuk	HB	Toronto

== Round two ==
Pick #	CFL team	Player	Position	University
5	Toronto Argonauts	Jacques Belec	FB	Western Ontario
6	Ottawa Rough Riders	Len Shaw	FB	McGill
7	Montreal Alouettes	Fred Wilot	QB	McGill
8	Hamilton Tiger-Cats	Jim Dodds	FB	McMaster

== Round three ==
Pick #	CFL team	Player	Position	University
9	Toronto Argonauts	Wilmer Crawford	HB	McMaster
10	Ottawa Rough Riders	Vince Capogreco	G	McGill
11	Montreal Alouettes	Roy McMurtry	T	Toronto
12	Hamilton Tiger-Cats	Jack Thompson	HB	Western Ontario
