= Chris Randle =

American gridiron football player (born 1988)

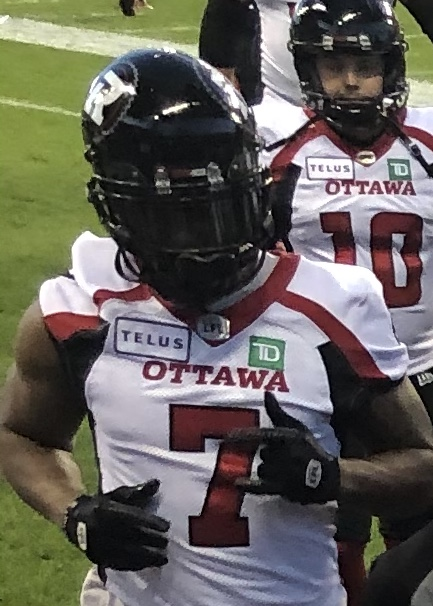
- Randle before a Ottawa Redblacks game in 2019

No. 7
- Position: Defensive back

Personal information
- Born: June 18, 1988 (age 38); Berkeley, California, U.S.
- Listed height: 5 ft 11 in (1.80 m)
- Listed weight: 193 lb (88 kg)

Career information
- High school: Golden Valley (Merced, California)
- College: Utah State
- NFL draft: 2011: undrafted

Career history
- Dallas Cowboys (2011)*; Calgary Stampeders (2012–2013); Winnipeg Blue Bombers (2014–2018); Ottawa Redblacks (2019)
- * Offseason or practice squad member only

Awards and highlights
- CFL All-Star (2017); CFL West All-Star (2017)

Career CFL statistics
- Sacks: 3
- Interceptions: 17
- Stats at CFL.ca
- Stats at Pro Football Reference

Chris Randle (born June 18, 1988) is an American former professional football defensive back. He played college football at Utah State. He was a member of the Calgary Stampeders, Winnipeg Blue Bombers, and Ottawa Redblacks in the Canadian Football League (CFL) and the Dallas Cowboys in the National Football League (NFL).

== Professional career ==
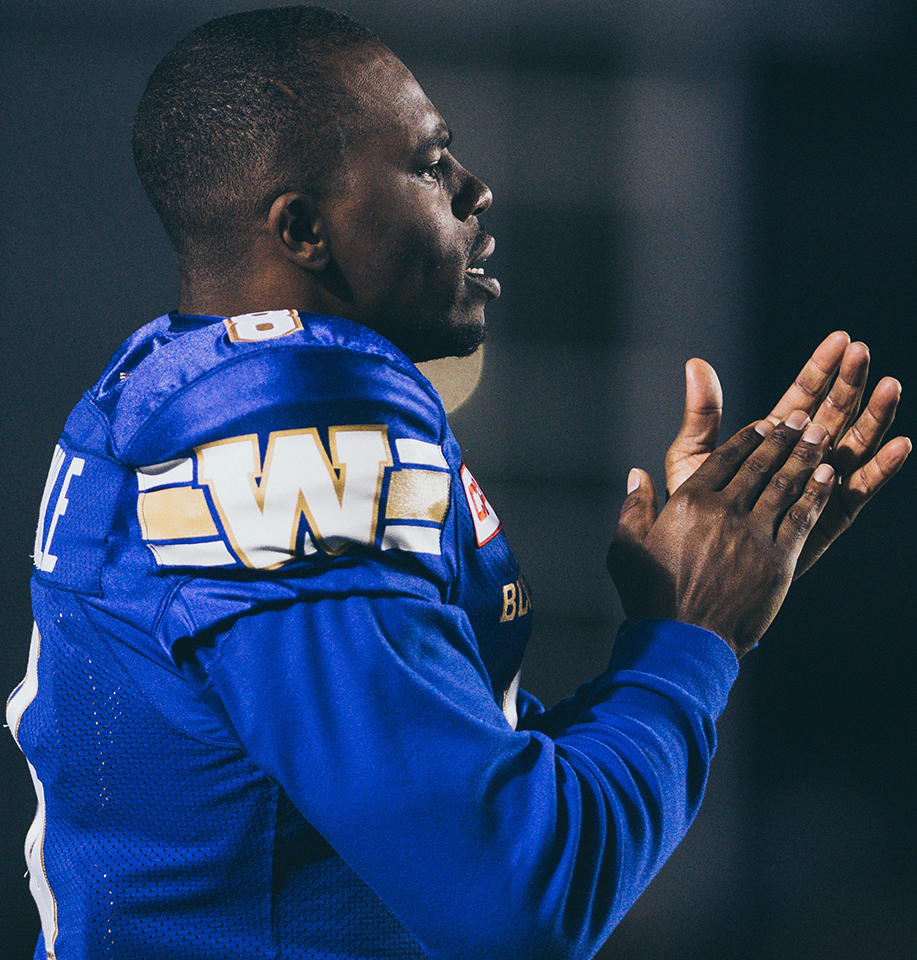
Randle with the Winnipeg Blue Bombers in 2016

=== Dallas Cowboys ===
After going undrafted in the 2011 NFL draft Randle signed with the Dallas Cowboys in July 2011.

=== Calgary Stampeders ===
Randle signed with the Calgary Stampeders on May 22, 2012. Randle played two seasons in Calgary, contributing 34 defensive tackles and eight special teams tackles in both seasons: He also recorded five interceptions.

=== Winnipeg Blue Bombers ===
On February 10, 2014, Randle was traded to the Winnipeg Blue Bombers. In his first four seasons in Winnipeg Randle became an increasingly fundamental part of the defense; culminating in being named a CFL All-Star in 2017. In January 2018 Randle and the Bombers agreed to a two-year contract extension; preventing him from becoming a free agent in February 2018. He was released by the Bombers on January 9, 2019.

=== Ottawa Redblacks ===
On January 25, 2019 Randle and the Ottawa Redblacks agreed to a one-year contract.

== Statistics ==
| | | Defence |
| Year | Team | Games | Tackles | ST | Sacks | Int | TD | FF |
|---|---|---|---|---|---|---|---|---|
| 2012 | CGY | 15 | 34 | 8 | 0 | 1 | 0 | 0 |
| 2013 | CGY | 16 | 34 | 8 | 1 | 4 | 1 | 1 |
| 2014 | WPG | 18 | 42 | 21 | 0 | 2 | 1 | 1 |
| 2015 | WPG | 10 | 33 | 7 | 1 | 1 | 0 | 0 |
| 2016 | WPG | 12 | 30 | 8 | 0 | 2 | 0 | 2 |
| 2017 | WPG | 18 | 60 | 4 | 1 | 5 | 2 | 0 |
| 2018 | WPG | 17 | 57 | 5 | 0 | 2 | 0 | 0 |
| 2019 | OTT | 16 | 47 | 0 | 0 | 1 | 0 | 0 |
| CFL totals | | 122 | 332 | 61 | 3 | 18 | 4 | 4 |
