= Deshawn Stevens =

Canadian gridiron football player (born 1997)

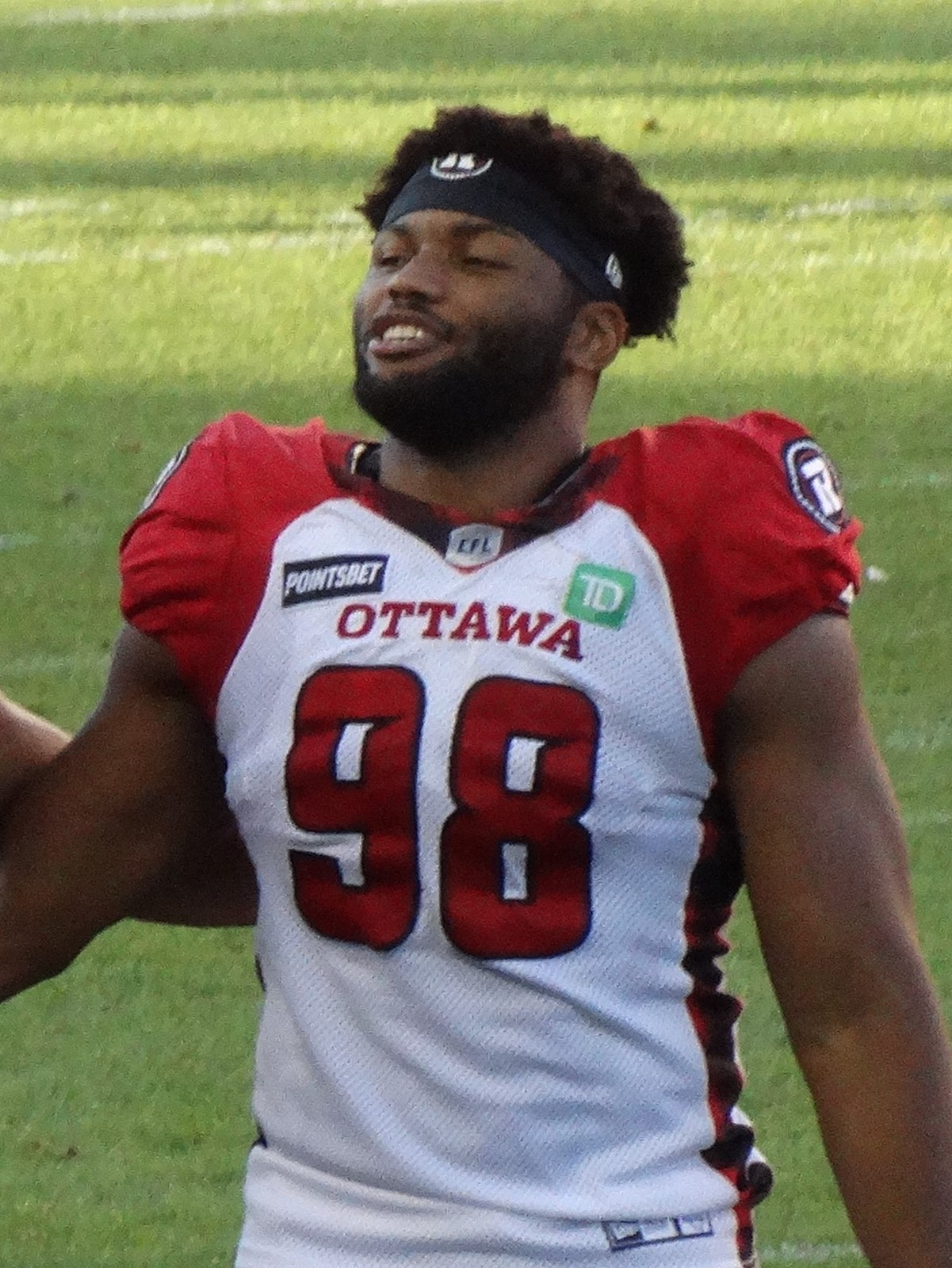
- Stevens with the Ottawa Redblacks in 2022

Profile
- Position: Defensive lineman

Personal information
- Born: June 9, 1997 (age 29); Toronto, Ontario, Canada
- Listed height: 6 ft 1 in (1.85 m)
- Listed weight: 255 lb (116 kg)

Career information
- High school: Kent School
- College: West Virginia; Maine
- CFL draft: 2021: 1st round, 6th overall pick

Career history
- 2022–2024: Ottawa Redblacks
- 2025: BC Lions
- 2025: Saskatchewan Roughriders

Awards and highlights
- Grey Cup champion (2025)
- Stats at CFL.ca

Deshawn Stevens (born June 9, 1997) is a Canadian professional football defensive lineman.

== College career ==
After using a redshirt season in 2016, Stevens played college football for the Maine Black Bears from 2017 to 2020. He played in 29 games, in which he had 211 tackles, 21.5 tackles for loss, 11.5 sacks, one interception, three fumble recoveries, and a forced fumble.

Stevens then transferred to the University of West Virginia in 2021 to play for the Mountaineers, where he played in 12 games and had 12 total tackles.

== Professional career ==
=== Ottawa Redblacks ===
Stevens was ranked as the 20th best player in the Canadian Football League's Amateur Scouting Bureau final rankings for players eligible in the 2021 CFL draft. He was then drafted in the first round, sixth overall, by the Ottawa Redblacks. However, he played out his final year of college eligibility in 2021. Thereafter, he signed with the Redblacks on May 6, 2022. Following training camp in 2022, he made the team's opening day roster and played in his first professional game on June 10, 2022, against the Winnipeg Blue Bombers. He played in all 18 regular season games, in which he recorded seven defensive tackles and six special teams tackles.

In 2023, Stevens played in 12 games and recorded one defensive tackle and four special teams tackles. He began the 2024 season on the injured list before moving to the practice roster. He dressed in one game before being released on July 22, 2024.

=== BC Lions ===
On December 6, 2024, Stevens signed with the BC Lions. On June 10, 2025, Stevens was placed on the Lions' 1-game injured list. He was released on June 16, 2025.

=== Saskatchewan Roughriders ===
On July 30, 2025, Stevens signed with the Saskatchewan Roughriders after spending more than a month in free agency.

== Personal life ==
Stevens was born to parents Selvin Stevens and Andrea Anderson and he has four brothers and five sisters.
