= Alex Fontana (Canadian football) =

Canadian gridiron football player (born 1995)

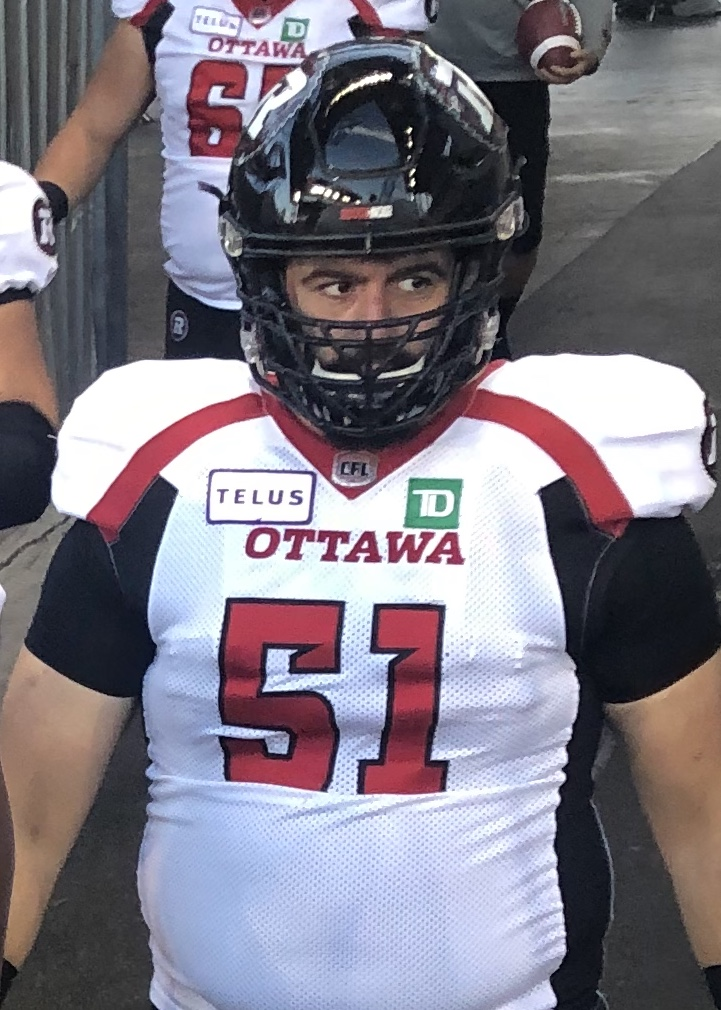
- Fontana with the Ottawa Redblacks in 2019

No. 51, 53
- Position: Offensive lineman

Personal information
- Born: May 1, 1995 (age 31); Toronto, Ontario, Canada
- Listed height: 6 ft 2 in (1.88 m)
- Listed weight: 300 lb (136 kg)

Career information
- High school: Pickering
- College: New Mexico Military; Houston; Kansas
- CFL draft: 2019: 1st round, 7th overall pick

Career history
- 2019–2021: Ottawa Redblacks
- 2022–2023: Hamilton Tiger-Cats
- Stats at CFL.ca

Alex Fontana (born May 1, 1995) is a Canadian former professional football offensive lineman who played for the Ottawa Redblacks and Hamilton Tiger-Cats of the Canadian Football League (CFL).

== College career ==
Fontana played college football for the New Mexico Military Institute Broncos in 2014 and 2015 and transferred to the University of Houston to play for the Cougars in 2016. He did not play in 2017 due to a foot injury and transferred to the University of Kansas to play for the Jayhawks in 2018 as a graduate transfer.

== Professional career ==
=== Ottawa Redblacks ===
Fontana was drafted by the Ottawa Redblacks in the first round with the seventh overall pick in the 2019 CFL draft and signed with the team on May 18, 2019. He made his professional debut on June 15, 2019, against the Calgary Stampeders, and played in all 18 regular season games in 2019. With the cancellation of the 2020 CFL season, he did not play in 2020 and also decided not to play in 2021 as he was placed on the Redblacks' suspended list on July 9, 2021. He became a free agent upon the expiry of his contract on February 8, 2022.

=== Hamilton Tiger-Cats ===
On February 8, 2022, it was announced that Fontana had signed with the Hamilton Tiger-Cats to a two-year contract. He was released on July 24, 2023.
