= Jack Roberts (Canadian football) =

Canadian football player

Profile
- Position: Guard

Personal information
- Born: c. 1930; Toronto, Ontario, Canada
- Died: April 14, 2013; Toronto, Ontario
- Listed height: 5 ft 10 in (1.78 m)
- Listed weight: 210 lb (95 kg)

Career history
- 1952–1953: Toronto Argonauts

Awards and highlights
- Grey Cup champion (1952)

Jack William Roberts (c. 1930 – April 14, 2013) was a Canadian professional football player who played for the Toronto Argonauts. He won the Grey Cup with them in 1952. He also attended and played football at the University of Toronto. He died in 2013.
