= Evan Johnson (Canadian football) =

Canadian gridiron football player (born 1994)

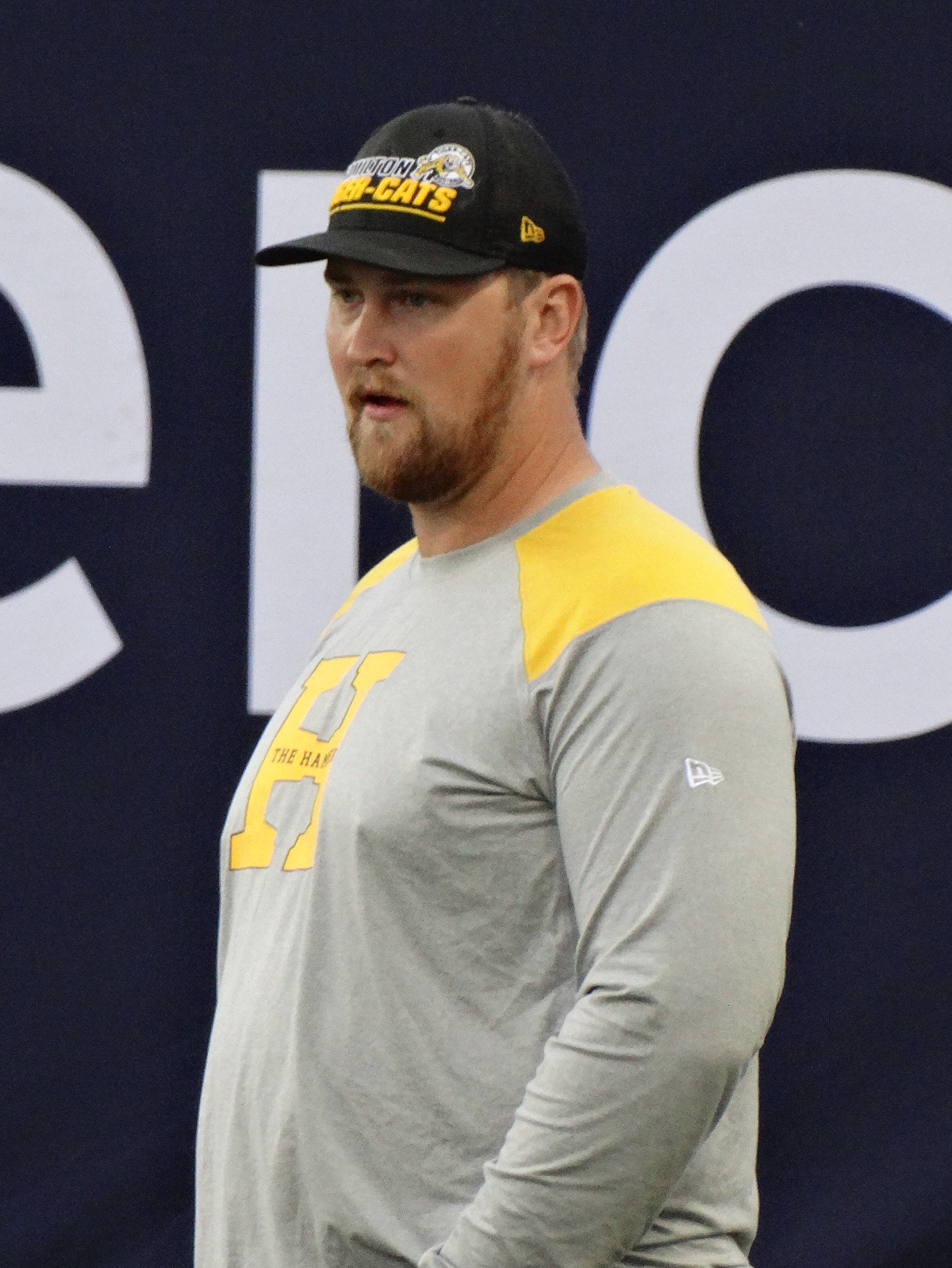
- Johnson with the Hamilton Tiger-Cats in 2024

No. 65
- Position: Offensive lineman

Personal information
- Born: August 21, 1994 (age 32); Regina, Saskatchewan, Canada
- Listed height: 6 ft 4 in (1.93 m)
- Listed weight: 290 lb (132 kg)

Career information
- University: Saskatchewan
- CFL draft: 2017: 1st round, 9th overall pick

Career history
- 2017–2020: Ottawa Redblacks
- 2021–2023: Saskatchewan Roughriders
- 2024: Hamilton Tiger-Cats
- Stats at CFL.ca

Evan Johnson (born August 21, 1994) is a Canadian professional football offensive lineman.

== University career ==
Johnson played U Sports football for the Saskatchewan Huskies from 2013 to 2016.

== Professional career ==
Pre-draft measurables
Height	Weight	40-yard dash	20-yard shuttle	Three-cone drill	Vertical jump	Broad jump	Bench press
6 ft 3 5/8 in (1.92 m)	297 lb (135 kg)	5.31 s	4.66 s	7.97 s	31.0 in (0.79 m)	8 ft 10 in (2.69 m)	21 reps
All values from CFL Combine

=== Ottawa Redblacks ===
Johnson was drafted by the Ottawa Redblacks in the first round with the ninth overall pick in the 2017 CFL draft and signed with the team on May 24, 2017. He dressed for his first professional regular season game on June 23, 2017 in the RedBlacks' season opener in a tie against the Calgary Stampeders. He played in his first playoff game in the 2017 East Semi-Final loss to the Saskatchewan Roughriders. In 2018, he played in 16 regular season games and played in the 106th Grey Cup game where the RedBlacks lost to the Stampeders. Overall, he played in three seasons for Ottawa where he dressed in 52 regular season games. He did not play in 2020 due to the cancellation of the 2020 CFL season.

=== Saskatchewan Roughriders ===
On the first day of free agency in 2021, Johnson signed with the Saskatchewan Roughriders on February 9, 2021. He played for three seasons for the Roughriders where he appeared in 33 regular season games. He became a free agent upon the expiry of his contract on February 13, 2024.

=== Hamilton Tiger-Cats ===
On February 13, 2024, it was announced that Johnson had signed with the Hamilton Tiger-Cats.
