= Mark Korte =

Canadian gridiron football player (born 1996)

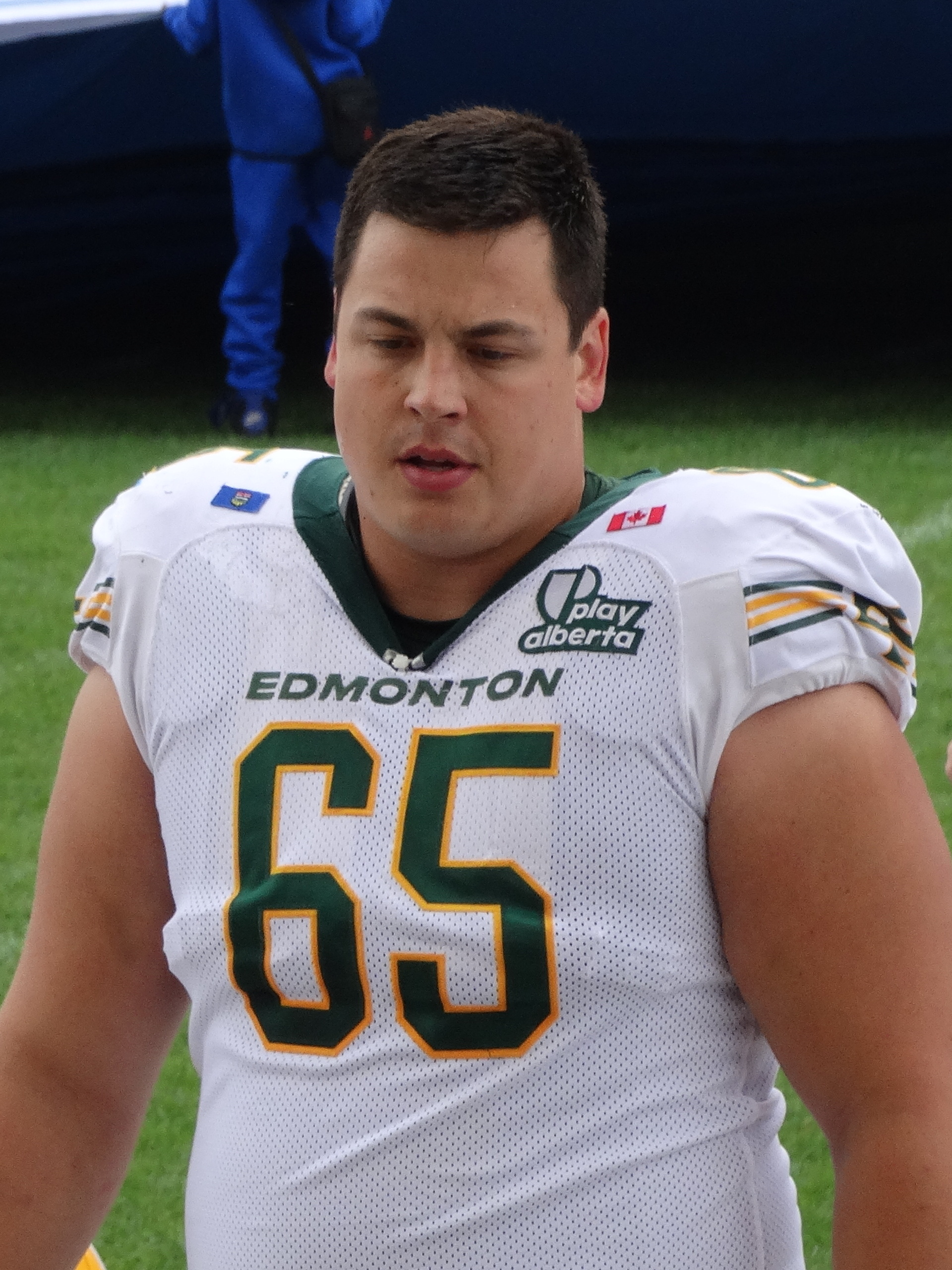
- Korte with the Edmonton Elks in 2025

No. 65 – Edmonton Elks
- Position: Offensive lineman
- Roster status: Active
- CFL status: National

Personal information
- Born: August 2, 1996 (age 30); Spruce Grove, Alberta, Canada
- Listed height: 6 ft 2 in (1.88 m)
- Listed weight: 293 lb (133 kg)

Career information
- University: Alberta
- CFL draft: 2018: 1st round, 4th overall pick

Career history
- Ottawa Redblacks (2018–2021); Edmonton Elks (2022–present)

Awards and highlights
- Grey Cup champion (2026); CFL West All-Star (2024)
- Stats at CFL.ca

Mark Korte (born August 2, 1996) is a Canadian professional football offensive lineman for the Edmonton Elks of the Canadian Football League (CFL).

== University career ==
Korte played U Sports football for the Alberta Golden Bears from 2014 to 2017.

== Professional career ==
Pre-draft measurables
| Height | Weight | 40-yard dash | 20-yard shuttle | Three-cone drill | Vertical jump | Broad jump | Bench press |
|---|---|---|---|---|---|---|---|
| 6 ft 2 1/2 in (1.89 m) | 293 lb (133 kg) | 5.20 s | 4.71 s | 7.97 s | 28.5 in (0.72 m) | 8 ft 7 3/4 in (2.64 m) | 16 reps |
All values from CFL Combine

=== Ottawa Redblacks ===
Korte was drafted by the Ottawa Redblacks in the first round with the fourth overall pick in the 2018 CFL draft and signed with the team on May 16, 2018. He made the team's active roster following training camp and played in the team's season opener on June 21, 2018, against the Saskatchewan Roughriders. He re-signed with the Ottawa Redblacks on January 26, 2021.

=== Edmonton Elks ===
Korte signed with the Edmonton Elks to open free agency on February 8, 2022.
