= William Lampman House =

Historic house in New York, United States

- U.S. National Register of Historic Places
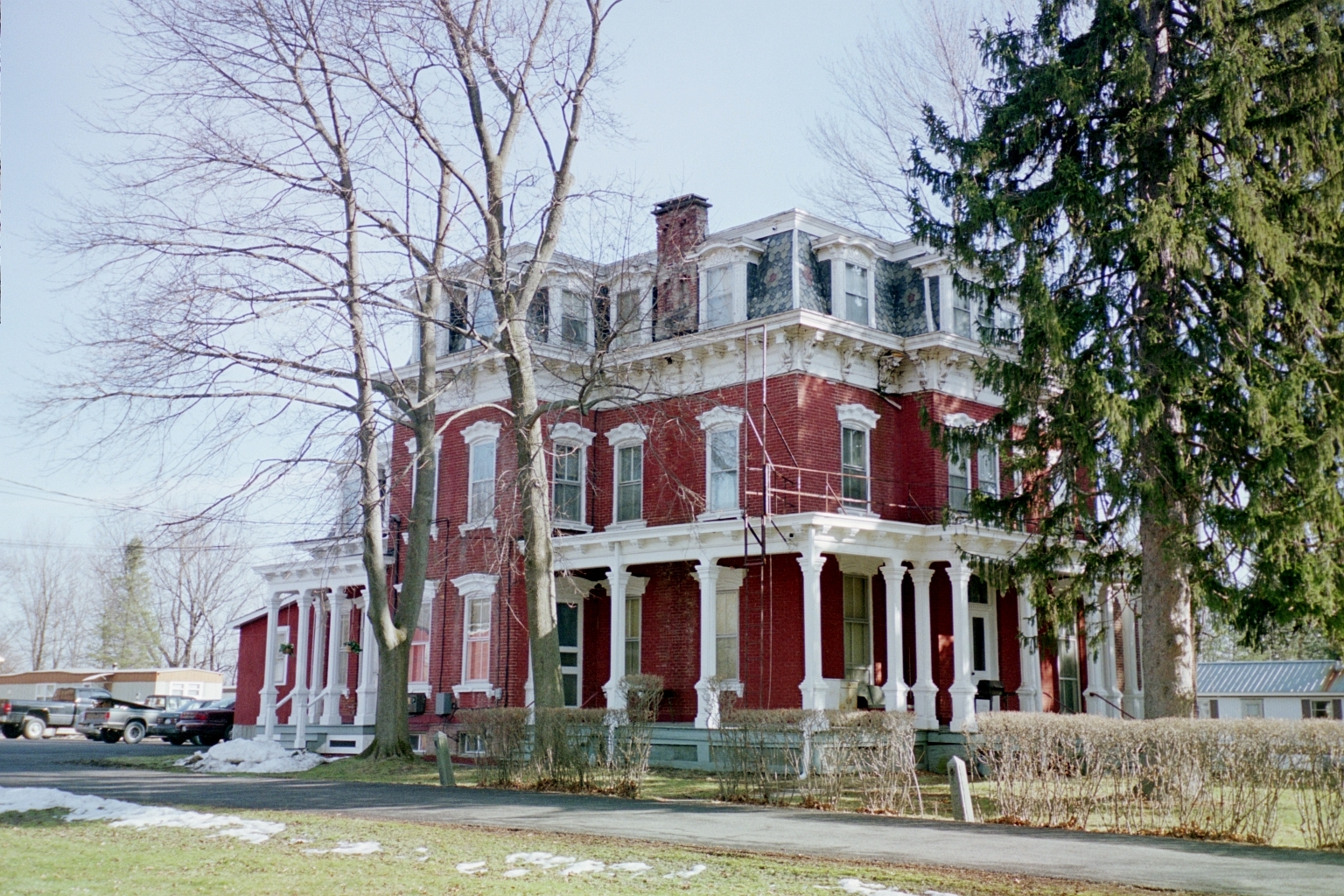

- Location within New York Location within the United States
- Location: Catskill, New York
- Coordinates: 42°12′42″N 73°52′22″W
- Built: 1891
- Architectural style: Second Empire
- NRHP reference No.: 95000960
- Added to NRHP: August 10, 1995

The William Lampman House is located at 147 Grandview Avenue, in Catskill, New York. The 2.6-acre (11,000 m^{2}) site is located on the west side of Catskill Creek, which bisects the town. Contractor, builder and lumberdealer William E. Lampman built the house around 1891. It is significant as an excellent example of the Second Empire style of architecture in Catskill. It is a three-story, brick L-shaped house on a stone foundation. Its characteristic mansard roof is topped with slate shingles. The house was constructed with a traditional center hall plan. In the 1940s, it was converted to apartments but still retains many characteristic architectural features in the interior. Also on the property is a contributing two story carriagehouse, which has fallen into disrepair.

The house was entered on the National Register of Historic Places on August 10, 1995.
