= Bill Berezowski =

Canadian football player (1928–2015)

Profile
- Position: Linebacker

Personal information
- Born: January 31, 1928; Rouyn, Quebec, Canada
- Died: October 23, 2015 (aged 87); Lunenburg, Nova Scotia, Canada
- Listed height: 6 ft 4 in (1.93 m)
- Listed weight: 210 lb (95 kg)

Career information
- University: McMaster

Career history
- 1953–1953: Hamilton Tiger-Cats
- 1954: Toronto Argonauts

Awards and highlights
- Grey Cup champion (1953)

William Berezowski (January 31, 1928 – October 23, 2015), also known as William Barclay, was a Canadian professional football player who played for the Hamilton Tiger-Cats and Toronto Argonauts. He won the Grey Cup with Hamilton in 1953.
