= Robert Herron =

American football player (born 1992)

No. 10
- Position: Wide receiver

Personal information
- Born: June 2, 1992 (age 34); Los Angeles, California, U.S.
- Listed height: 5 ft 9 in (1.75 m)
- Listed weight: 193 lb (88 kg)

Career information
- High school: Susan Miller Dorsey (Los Angeles)
- College: Wyoming
- NFL draft: 2014: 6th round, 185th overall pick

Career history
- Tampa Bay Buccaneers (2014); Miami Dolphins (2015–2016)*; Oakland Raiders (2016)*
- * Offseason or practice squad member only

Career NFL statistics
- Receptions: 6
- Receiving yards: 58
- Receiving touchdowns: 1
- Stats at Pro Football Reference

Robert Herron (/ˈhɛrɒn/ HERR-on; born June 2, 1992) is an American former professional football player who was a wide receiver in the National Football League (NFL). He played college football for the Wyoming Cowboys and was selected by the Tampa Bay Buccaneers in the sixth round of the 2014 NFL draft.

== Early life ==
Herron was born in Los Angeles, California. He was raised by his fathers cousin because his father was in prison and his mother was not a "consistent presence". He attended Susan Miller Dorsey High School in Los Angeles, California. As a senior, he caught 24 passes for 600 yards and six touchdowns, while adding 15 carries for 171 yards and three touchdowns. He earned him first-team all-city and all-league honors, and helped guide his team to an appearance in the semifinals of the state playoffs.

Along with playing football, Herron also ran track and field. He lettered as a sprinter in his final two years. He posted a career-best time of 10.5 seconds in the 100 meters, while also running the 200 meters in 20.99 seconds.

== College career ==
Herron attended the University of Wyoming from 2010 to 2013. Upon arriving at Wyoming, he signed so late in the process that he missed all of the summer camps and workouts. Despite this, he split time at wide receiver and running back, as he appeared in 10 of 12 games as a freshman in 2010. He carried the ball 40 times for 235 yards (5.9 avg), and caught 6 passes for 57 yards.

In 2011, predominantly playing wide receiver, he started the season catching seven passes for 104 yards and two touchdowns, including the game-winning touchdown with 22 seconds left in the fourth quarter vs. Weber State. Herron finished his season second on the team with 43 receptions for 379 yards and three touchdowns.

In 2012, Herron established himself as a deep threat receiver, averaging 21.2 yds per reception. Opening the season vs #15 Texas, he had a breakout performance, totaling five catches for 173 yards and two touchdowns, becoming the National Receiver of the Week. He went on to catch 31 passes for 657 yards and eight touchdowns as a junior.

In 2013, as a senior, Herron set career highs in receptions (72), receiving yards (937), and touchdowns (9). In Wyoming's final home game, Herron recorded 11 catches, 141 receiving yards and four touchdowns in a 59–56 overtime win over Hawaii. His four TD receptions in the game tied the school record set by Marcus Davis in 1995. He earned honorable mention All-MWC honors.

During his career he played in 42 games, finishing with 152 receptions for 2,030 yards and 20 touchdowns. After his senior season he was invited to the Senior Bowl and NFL Combine.

== Professional career ==
Pre-draft measurables
Height	Weight	Arm length	Hand span	40-yard dash	10-yard split	20-yard split	20-yard shuttle	Three-cone drill	Vertical jump	Broad jump	Bench press
5 ft 9 in (1.75 m)	193 lb (88 kg)	30 1/2 in (0.77 m)	9 3/4 in (0.25 m)	4.35 s	2.50 s	1.54 s	4.27 s	6.84 s	35.5 in (0.90 m)	10 ft 5 in (3.18 m)	18 reps
All values from NFL Combine except 40 yd dash from Wyoming Pro Day

=== Tampa Bay Buccaneers ===
Herron was taken in the sixth round with the 185th overall pick of the 2014 NFL draft by the Tampa Bay Buccaneers.

Herron was waived by Buccaneers on September 1, 2015.

=== Miami Dolphins ===
The Miami Dolphins signed Herron to their practice squad on October 14, 2015. On January 6, 2016, Herron signed a reserve/future contract with the Miami Dolphins. On April 28, he was waived.

=== Oakland Raiders ===
On May 24, 2016, Herron signed to the Oakland Raiders. He was waived on May 26, 2016.
