= Jeremy Grable =

American gridiron football player (born 1991)

No. 49
- Position: Linebacker

Personal information
- Born: June 20, 1991 (age 35); Milton, Georgia, U.S.
- Listed height: 6 ft 0 in (1.83 m)
- Listed weight: 220 lb (100 kg)

Career information
- High school: Milton (GA)
- College: Valdosta State
- NFL draft: 2014: undrafted

Career history
- Tampa Bay Buccaneers (2014)*; Winnipeg Blue Bombers (2017)*
- * Offseason or practice squad member only

Awards and highlights
- NCAA Division II national champion (2012)
- Stats at Pro Football Reference

Jeremy Grable (born June 20, 1991) is an American former football linebacker. He was a member of the Tampa Bay Buccaneers of the National Football League (NFL).

== Early life ==
Grable played for Valdosta State University from 2010 to 2012.

== Professional career ==
=== Tampa Bay Buccaneers ===
After going undrafted in the 2014 NFL draft, Grable was signed by the Tampa Bay Buccaneers on July 22, 2014. He was released by the Buccaneers on August 5, 2014. On November 14, 2014, Grable was placed on the practice squad injured reserve.

=== Winnipeg Blue Bombers ===
Grable signed with the Winnipeg Blue Bombers (CFL) on April 18, 2017.
