= Harry Lampman =

Canadian football player (1927–2018)

Profile
- Position: End

Personal information
- Born: June 22, 1927; Hamilton, Ontario
- Died: June 9, 2018 (aged 90); Burlington, Ontario
- Listed height: 6 ft 3 in (1.91 m)
- Listed weight: 226 lb (103 kg)

Career history
- 1952–1956: Saskatchewan Roughriders
- 1957–1959: Hamilton Tiger-Cats
- 1960: Montreal Alouettes

Awards and highlights
- Grey Cup champion (1957)

Harry Lampman (June 22, 1927 – June 9, 2018) was a Canadian professional football player who played for the Saskatchewan Roughriders, Hamilton Tiger-Cats, and Montreal Alouettes. He won the Grey Cup with Hamilton in 1957. He previously played football at and attended the Queen's University.
