= George Klein (Canadian football) =

Canadian football halfback, played for BC Lions and Montreal Alouettes

Profile
- Position: Halfback

Personal information
- Born: May 15, 1932
- Died: September 23, 1999 (aged 67)
- Listed height: 5 ft 8 in (1.73 m)
- Listed weight: 175 lb (79 kg)

Career information
- University: McGill

Career history
- 1954: BC Lions
- 1955: Montreal Alouettes

George Klein (May 15, 1932 – September 23, 1999) was a Canadian professional football player who played for the BC Lions and Montreal Alouettes. He previously played football at McGill University.
