= Bob Garside =

Canadian football player

Profile
- Positions: Halfback, Linebacker

Personal information
- Born: c. 1929
- Died: January 10, 1997 (aged 67–68); St. Catharines, Ontario, Canada
- Listed height: 6 ft 1 in (1.85 m)
- Listed weight: 220 lb (100 kg)

Career history
- 1952: Ottawa Rough Riders
- 1953–1954: Hamilton Tiger-Cats

Awards and highlights
- Grey Cup champion (1953)

Robert Alexander Garside (c. 1929 – January 10, 1997) was a Canadian football player who played for the Hamilton Tiger-Cats and Ottawa Rough Riders. He won the Grey Cup with Hamilton in 1953 and retired in 1955 due to injury (torn knee ligaments). He previously played football at and attended the University of Toronto. In 1957, he became the head coach of the Brantford Tiger-Cat Bees in the Ontario Rugby Football Union after serving as an assistant the prior year. He died in 1997.
