= George Uko =

American gridiron football player (born 1992)

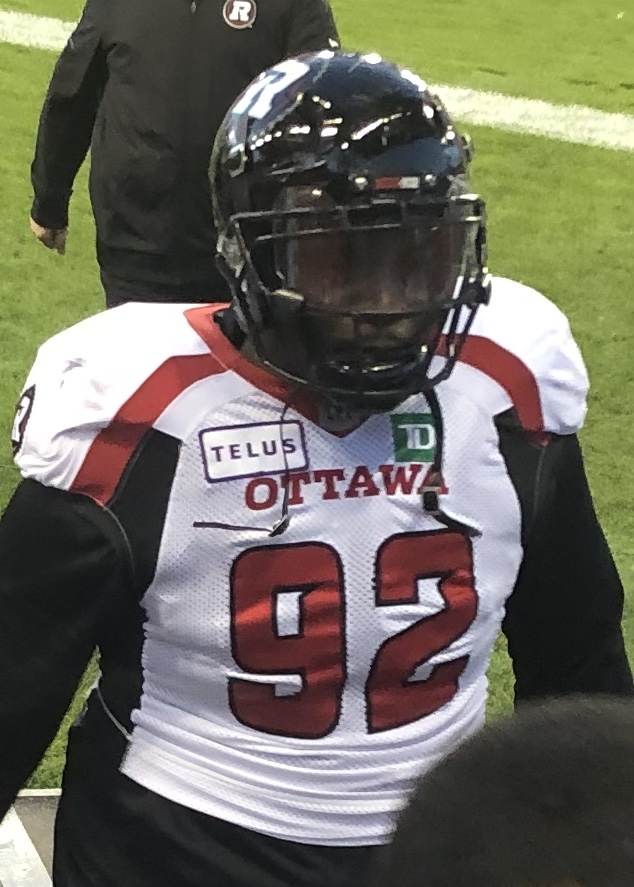
- Uko with the Ottawa Redblacks in 2019

No. 58
- Position: Defensive end

Personal information
- Born: February 11, 1992 (age 34); Chino, California, U.S.
- Listed height: 6 ft 3 in (1.91 m)
- Listed weight: 284 lb (129 kg)

Career information
- High school: Don Lugo
- College: USC
- NFL draft: 2014: undrafted

Career history
- New Orleans Saints (2014)*; Tampa Bay Buccaneers (2014); Denver Broncos (2015–2016)*; BC Lions (2016); Ottawa Redblacks (2018–2019)
- * Offseason or practice squad member only

Awards and highlights
- Super Bowl champion (50)
- Stats at Pro Football Reference
- Stats at CFL.ca

George Uko (born February 11, 1992) is an American former professional football defensive end. He earned a Super Bowl ring as a member of the Denver Broncos in their Super Bowl 50 win. He was also a member of the New Orleans Saints, Tampa Bay Buccaneers, Denver Broncos, BC Lions, and Ottawa Redblacks.

== Professional career ==
=== New Orleans Saints ===
After going undrafted in the 2014 NFL draft, Uko signed with the New Orleans Saints on May 13, 2014. He was waived on August 26, 2014.

=== Tampa Bay Buccaneers ===
On December 16, 2014, Uko was promoted from the practice squad to the active roster.

=== Denver Broncos ===
Uko joined the Denver Broncos as a part of the practice squad. On February 7, 2016, Uko was part of the Broncos team that won Super Bowl 50 to conclude the 2015 NFL season. In the game, the Broncos defeated the Carolina Panthers by a score of 24–10. Uko was waived by the Broncos on April 14, 2016.

=== BC Lions ===
Uko signed with the BC Lions of the Canadian Football League (CFL) on May 19, 2016. Prior to the start of the season he was transferred to the team's practice roster on June 18, 2016. He did not make an appearance for the Lions during his only year with the team.

=== Ottawa Redblacks ===
Uko signed with the Ottawa Redblacks (CFL) in April 2018 in time for the 2018 CFL season, after not playing football in 2017. He played in 10 games for the Redblacks in his first year with the club, contributing with 19 tackles and three quarterback sacks. He was released on March 2, 2020.
