= CFL draft =

Annual sports draft of the Canadian Football League

The CFL draft (French: Repêchage de la LCF, also known as the CFL Canadian draft, CFL college draft, or the Canadian college draft) is an annual sports draft in which the teams of the Canadian Football League (CFL) select eligible Canadian players, typically from the ranks of U Sports football or NCAA college football. Additionally, a smaller draft, called the CFL global draft is held separately to select eligible non-Canadian/American players from the same ranks. The drafts are held once every year on the same day, approximately six weeks prior to the start of the upcoming season (typically late April or early May). Member clubs make selections based on the reverse order of the previous year's standings, with the team with the worst record being awarded the first selection, the Grey Cup runner-up getting the second-to-last selection and the Grey Cup champion selecting last.

Formerly held as part of annual league meetings in Hamilton, and occasionally televised, the draft was previously held via conference call. In 2007, the league began producing a free webcast of the event. Starting in 2009, the first two rounds have been broadcast live on TSN.

== History ==
CFL draft logo used until 2012

Before the CFL draft was implemented, teams selected players based on territorial rights. For the sake of fair competition, a draft would be held to ensure an equal representation of players and talent. An experimental draft was held in 1952 by what was then the Interprovincial Rugby Football Union (now the East Division of the CFL); the first formal Canadian football draft was held the next year. Selection was limited to players from five universities in Ontario and Quebec: McGill University, Queen's University, University of Toronto, University of Western Ontario, and McMaster University. The Montreal Alouettes selected Doug McNichol from Western Ontario as he became the first Canadian football player to be drafted.

In 1956, with the establishment of the Canadian Football Council, a nationwide draft was established, with the five teams of the Western Interprovincial Football Union now taking part and players from all Canadian universities becoming eligible. Additionally, the conference that featured the losing team in the Grey Cup would have its team with the poorest record select first. Two years later, the formation of the present-day Canadian Football League was complete.

Further modifications to the structure of the draft took place in the 1973 CFL draft as Canadian players from American schools would now be eligible for the draft. Prior to this, teams would be awarded territorial rights for non-import players from U.S.-based schools based on the territory in which he was domiciled. Because this would almost eliminate any geographical exemptions, teams would also be permitted to make two territorial exemptions per draft, regardless of school location, beginning in 1973. Territorial exemptions were abolished by 1985, introducing the modern era of the CFL draft, though they were temporarily re-instituted from 2019 to 2023. Territorial selections were replaced in 2024 with picks that rewarded teams that played the most Canadians in the previous season.

In 1986, the draft was reduced from nine rounds to eight rounds and was further reduced to seven rounds in 1993. In 1997, the CFL draft consisted of only six rounds, which was a format that was used until it was changed in 2013 when it was expanded to seven rounds. For the 2016 CFL draft, the format was changed to include eight rounds of selections.

In 2019, the CFL held two drafts (one of Mexican players and one of European players) to select its first group of players under its "global" player designation for players of non-Canadian and non-American nationalities. Since 2021, it has held a singular global draft for these players separate from the main CFL draft.

== Player eligibility ==
Since 2014, U Sports players become eligible for the CFL draft three years after completing their first year of eligibility at university. Additionally, NCAA and NAIA players are eligible to be selected after completing their senior season of eligibility. Prior to this change, all players would become eligible four years after first attending a post-secondary institution, leading many players to return to school after being drafted. Canadian national university and college players are not permitted to enter the league without being subject to the draft and players are only eligible to be drafted once. Since 2019, players who qualify for a "global" designation (players who are neither Canadian or American) are subject to a separate draft.

American players are not subject to the draft and are instead inducted via the negotiation list process.

== Selection order ==
The selection order of the draft is based on a combination of the regular season standings and post-season results from the previous season. Non-Grey Cup participants are ranked in reverse order of the previous season's standings with the team with the league-worst record being awarded the first overall pick. Any ties between teams in different conferences are decided the same way as tied division opponents: first by season series, then by other tie-breaking formulas. The losing team in the previous year's Grey Cup game selects second-last while the winner of the previous year's Grey Cup selects last in each round. The order remains the same in each round.

Teams are permitted to trade draft picks before and during the draft for either another team's draft picks or players. This is a common practice resulting in some teams having multiple selections in one round while other teams may have none. Teams may also trade conditional draft picks, meaning the transaction will only occur if a condition is fulfilled (for example, if a traded player plays enough games or signs a contract extension with his new team).

== See also ==
- List of first overall Canadian Football League draft picks
- CFL Combine
