= Nolan MacMillan =

Canadian football player (born 1990)

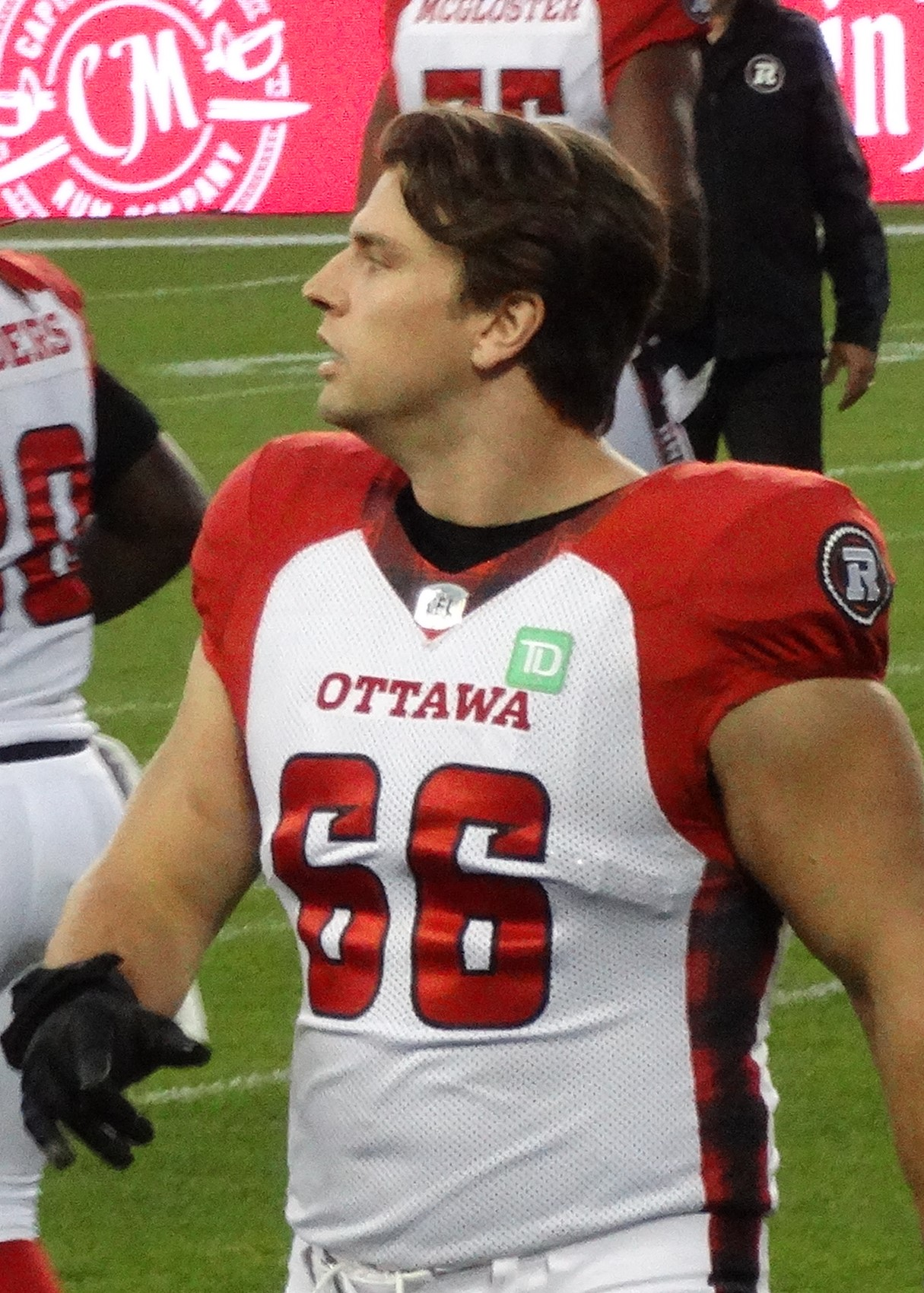
- MacMillan with the Ottawa Redblacks in 2021

Profile
- Position: Offensive lineman

Personal information
- Born: December 21, 1990 (age 35); Arnprior, Ontario, Canada
- Listed height: 6 ft 6 in (1.98 m)
- Listed weight: 294 lb (133 kg)

Career information
- College: Iowa
- CFL draft: 2013: 1st round, 9th overall pick

Career history
- 2014–2021: Ottawa Redblacks

Awards and highlights
- Grey Cup champion (2016); CFL East All-Star (2019)
- Stats at CFL.ca

Nolan MacMillan (born December 21, 1990) is a Canadian former professional football offensive lineman who played seven seasons with the Ottawa Redblacks of the Canadian Football League (CFL). He is a Grey Cup champion after winning with the Redblacks in 2016 and was named a CFL East Division All-Star in 2019.

== Early life ==
MacMillan attended St. Michael's College School in Toronto. He attended the Hun School of Princeton in New Jersey as a senior.

== College career ==
MacMillan played college football for the Iowa Hawkeyes from 2010 to 2013 while using a redshirt season in 2009.

== Professional career ==
MacMillan was drafted ninth overall in the 2013 CFL draft by the Ottawa Redblacks and was the first player ever to be drafted by the team. After completing his college eligibility, MacMillan signed with the Redblacks on May 28, 2014. He became a free agent upon the expiry of his contract on February 8, 2022. He announced his retirement on August 5, 2022, and finished his career having played in 87 games and three Grey Cups, including the championship win in 2016.

== Personal life ==
MacMillan was born in Arnprior to parents Janet and Paul MacMillan.
