= 2009 Hamilton Tiger-Cats season =

Season of Canadian Football League team the Hamilton Tiger-Cats

- General manager: Bob O'Billovich
- Head coach: Marcel Bellefeuille
- Home stadium: Ivor Wynne Stadium

Results
- Record: 9–9
- Division place: 2nd, East
- Playoffs: Lost East Semi-Final
- Team MOP: Arland Bruce III
- Team MOC: Marwan Hage
- Team MOR: Marquay McDaniel

Uniform

The 2009 Hamilton Tiger-Cats season was the 52nd season for the team in the Canadian Football League (CFL) and their 60th overall. The Tiger-Cats finished the season in second place in the East Division with a 9–9 record and qualified for the Grey Cup playoffs for the first time since 2004.

== Off-season ==
=== CFL draft ===
The 2009 CFL draft took place on May 2, 2009. The Tiger-Cats selected tackle Simeon Rottier from the University of Alberta first overall. They originally also had the third overall pick as well but traded that to the BC Lions for sixth and thirteenth overall picks so the Lions could select their desired player, Jamall Lee.

Round	Pick	Player	Position	School/Club team
1	1	Simeon Rottier	OT	Alberta
1	6	Darcy Brown	WR	St. Mary's
2	13	Ryan Hinds	DB	New Hampshire
3	22	Scott McCuaig	LB	UBC
5	33	Guillarme Allard-Cameus	RB	Laval
5	38	Raymond Wladichuk	DB	Simon Fraser
6	41	Cassidy Doneff	WR	Washburn
6	46	Bill McGrath	OL	Indiana State

=== Transactions ===
Date	Type	Incoming	Outgoing	Team
Jan. 25	retirement	n/a	Jeff Piercy	
Jan. 30	free agency	Agustin Barrenechea	n/a	
Feb. 3	released	n/a	Pat Woodcock, Rocky Schwartz, Michael Botterill, Cornelius Anthony, Terrence Patrick and Sacha Lancaster	
Feb. 6	free agency and releases	Johnnie Morant, Willie Quinnie	Tony Miles, Charles Thomas	
Feb. 16	free agency	Alexandre Gauthier	n/a	
Feb. 16	free agency	n/a	Jesse Lumsden	Edmonton Eskimos
Feb. 16	free agency	n/a	Alain Kashama	Calgary Stampeders
Feb. 18	free agency	Matt Kirk	n/a	
Feb. 20	released	n/a	Casey Printers	
Feb. 24	free agency	Josh Betts, Erik Meyer	n/a	
Mar. 20	free agency	Kevin Glenn	n/a	

== Preseason ==
Week	Date	Opponent	Score	Result	Attendance	Record
A	June 17	at Winnipeg Blue Bombers	32–22	Loss	27,742	0–1
B	June 23	Toronto Argonauts	27–17	Loss	16,225	0–2

== Regular season ==
=== Season standings ===
East Division
Team	GP	W	L	T	PF	PA	Pts	
Montreal Alouettes	18	15	3	0	600	324	30	Details
Hamilton Tiger-Cats	18	9	9	0	449	428	18	Details
Winnipeg Blue Bombers	18	7	11	0	386	508	14	Details
Toronto Argonauts	18	3	15	0	328	502	6	Details

=== Season schedule ===
Week	Date	Opponent	Score	Result	Attendance	Record
1	July 1	Toronto Argonauts	30–17	Loss	23,211	0–1
2	July 10	at BC Lions	31–28	Win	26,885	1–1
3	July 18	Winnipeg Blue Bombers	25–13	Win	24,292	2–1
4	July 23	at Montreal Alouettes	21–8	Loss	20,202	2–2
5	July 31	BC Lions	30–18	Win	20,103	3–2
6	August 8	Edmonton Eskimos	28–21	Win	19,206	4–2
7	August 16	at Saskatchewan Roughriders	33–23	Loss	30,360	4–3
8	Bye					
9	August 29	at Edmonton Eskimos	31–30	Loss	35,036	4–4
10	Sept 7	Toronto Argonauts	34–15	Win	30,293	5–4
11	Sept 11	at Toronto Argonauts	25–22 (2OT)	Loss	26,421	5–5
12	Sept 18	Calgary Stampeders	24–17	Win	19,448	6–5
13	Sept 25	Montreal Alouettes	42–8	Loss	22,083	6–6
14	Oct 3	at Calgary Stampeders	15–14	Loss	36,753	6–7
15	Oct 12	Winnipeg Blue Bombers	38–28	Loss	19,562	6–8
16	Oct 18	at Montreal Alouettes	41–38	Loss	20,202	6–9
17	Oct 23	at Toronto Argonauts	26–17	Win	25,352	7–9
18	Oct 31	Saskatchewan Roughriders	24–6	Win	24,586	8–9
19	Nov 8	at Winnipeg Blue Bombers	39–17	Win	29,038	9–9

== Roster ==
2009 Hamilton Tiger-Cats final roster
Quarterbacks: 5 Kevin Glenn; 12 Quinton Porter; 4 Adam Tafralis; Running backs: 14 DeAndra' Cobb; 15 Tyler Ebell; 33 Andre Sadeghian; 23 John Williams; Receivers: 87 Chris Bauman; 4 Arland Bruce; 86 Matt Carter; 8 Corey Grant; 11 Drisan James; 6 Marquay McDaniel; 85 Prechae Rodriguez; 88 Dave Stala	Offensive linemen: 67 Peter Dyakowski G; 66 Alexandre Gauthier T; 64 Dan Goodspeed T; 62 Marwan Hage C; 52 George Hudson G/C; 65 Simeon Rottier G/T; Defensive linemen: 97 Darrell Adams DT; 95 Justin Hickman DE; 93 Matt Kirk DT; 94 Khari Long DE; 71 Garrett McIntyre DE/DT; 99 Jermaine Reid DT; Special teams: 51 Jordan Matechuk LS; 13 Nick Setta K/P	Linebackers: 48 Yannick Carter; 35 Otis Floyd; 28 Jamall Johnson; 25 Markeith Knowlton; 44 Ray Mariuz; Defensive backs: 20 Dylan Barker; 3 Marc Beswick; 19 Sandy Beveridge; 31 Jykine Bradley; 27 Lamont Reid; 7 Bo Smith; 26 Chris Thompson; 9 Geoff Tisdale	Reserve roster: 29 Lawrence Gordon DB; 53 Cedric Gagné-Marcoux G; 98 Montez Murphy DT; Practice roster: 41 Lewis Baker DB; 84 Shawn Bayes WR; 36 Isaac Brown LB; 2 Airese Currie WR; -- Tony Davis DB; 22 LaRoche Jackson DB; 60 Chris Kowalczuk C/G; 80 Rodgeriqus Smith WR; 40 Spenser Smith LB; 69 Matt Spanos T; 72 Albert Toeaina T	Injured list: 18 David Ball WR; 39 Agustín Barrenechea LB; 90 Demonte' Bolden DT; 16 Jason Boltus QB; 55 Zac Carlson G; 43 Dennis Haley LB; 21 Kenton Keith RB; 49 Robert Pavlovic FB; 38 Matt Robichaud LS; 32 Tre Smith RB; Suspended: 68 Matt Morencie G; Italics indicate International player Roster updated 2026-04-17

== Playoffs ==
=== Schedule ===
Week	Date	Time	Opponent	Score	Result	Attendance
20	November 15	1:00 PM	BC Lions	34–27 (OT)	Loss	27,430

=== Bracket ===
November 15: Division Semifinals
East
W4	BC Lions	34*
E2	Hamilton Tiger-Cats	27
West
W3	Edmonton Eskimos	21
W2	Calgary Stampeders	24

November 22: Division Finals
W4	BC Lions	18
E1	Montreal Alouettes	56
W2	Calgary Stampeders	17
W1	Saskatchewan Roughriders	27

November 29: 97th Grey Cup; McMahon Stadium – Calgary
E1	Montreal Alouettes	28
W1	Saskatchewan Roughriders	27

*-Team won in Overtime.

=== East Semi-Final ===
Date and time: Sunday, November 15, 1:00 PM Eastern Standard Time
Venue: Ivor Wynne Stadium, Hamilton, Ontario

Team	Q1	Q2	Q3	Q4	OT	Total
BC Lions	3	13	7	4	7	34
Hamilton Tiger-Cats	3	3	10	11	0	27
