= 2009 BC Lions season =

Canadian football team season

- General manager: Wally Buono
- Head coach: Wally Buono
- Home stadium: BC Place Stadium

Results
- Record: 8–10
- Division place: 4th, West
- Playoffs: Lost East Final
- Team MOP: Geroy Simon
- Team MOR: Martell Mallett

Uniform

The 2009 BC Lions season was the 52nd season for the team in the Canadian Football League (CFL) and their 56th overall. The Lions finished the season in fourth place in the West Division with a disappointing 8–10 record after losing their last three regular season games. While it was their first losing record since 2001, they still managed to play in the East-Semi Final playoff game against the Hamilton Tiger-Cats after that same team eliminated the Winnipeg Blue Bombers in the last game of the season. The Lions would go on to play in the first East Final in franchise history, which they lost to the Montreal Alouettes. It was the sixth consecutive appearance for the Lions in a division final and the third consecutive season that their season was ended by the eventual Grey Cup champions.

== Offseason ==
=== CFL draft ===
The 2009 CFL draft took place on May 2, 2009. The Lions traded their sixth and thirteenth overall picks for Hamilton's third overall pick in order to secure the chance to draft Bishop's running back Jamall Lee.

Round	Pick	Player	Position	School/Club team
1	3	Jamall Lee	RB	Bishop's
1	4	James Yurichuk	LB	Bishop's
1	5	Matt Carter	WR	Acadia
3	21	Matt Morencie	OL	Windsor
4	29	Tang Bacheyie	DB	Kansas
5	37	Jonathan Pierre-Etienne	DE	Montreal

== Preseason ==
Week	Date	Opponent	Score	Result	Attendance	Record
A	June 17	at Calgary Stampeders	37–30	Loss	25,463	0–1
B	June 23	Edmonton Eskimos	31–19	Loss	23,217	0–2

# Games played with white uniforms.

== Regular season ==
=== Season standings ===
West Division
Team	GP	W	L	T	PF	PA	Pts	
Saskatchewan Roughriders	18	10	7	1	514	484	21	Details
Calgary Stampeders	18	10	7	1	514	443	21	Details
Edmonton Eskimos	18	9	9	0	469	502	18	Details
BC Lions	18	8	10	0	431	502	16	Details

=== Season schedule ===
Week	Date	Opponent	Score	Result	Attendance	Record
1	July 3	at Saskatchewan Roughriders	28–24	Loss	30,062	0–1
2	July 10	Hamilton Tiger-Cats	31–28	Loss	26,885	0–2
3	July 16	at Edmonton Eskimos	40–22	Win	33,661	1–2
4	July 24	Calgary Stampeders	48–10	Loss	27,191	1–3
5	July 31	at Hamilton Tiger-Cats	30–18	Loss	20,103	1–4
6	August 7	Saskatchewan Roughriders	35–20	Win	30,117	2–4
7	August 14	at Toronto Argonauts	36–28	Win	24,754	3–4
8	August 21	Winnipeg Blue Bombers	37–10	Loss	27,983	3–5
9	Bye					3–5
10	Sept 4	Montreal Alouettes	19–12	Win	27,199	4–5
11	Sept 13	at Montreal Alouettes	28–24	Loss	20,202	4–6
12	Sept 19	Toronto Argonauts	23–17	Win	27,515	5–6
13	Sept 25	at Calgary Stampeders	27–18	Loss	36,702	5–7
14	Oct 2	Saskatchewan Roughriders	19–16	Win	31,958	6–7
15	Oct 9	at Edmonton Eskimos	34–31	Win	30,120	7–7
16	Oct 18	at Winnipeg Blue Bombers	24–21	Win	24,048	8–7
17	Oct 24	at Saskatchewan Roughriders	33–30 (OT)	Loss	30,945	8–8
18	Oct 31	Calgary Stampeders	28–26	Loss	27,131	8–9
19	Nov 6	Edmonton Eskimos	45–13	Loss	31,515	8–10

# Games played with colour uniforms.
# Games played with white uniforms.
# Games played with alternate uniforms.
# Games played with retro uniforms.

== Roster ==
2009 BC Lions final roster
Quarterbacks: 7 Jarious Jackson; 14 Travis Lulay; 1 Casey Printers; Running backs: 28 Lyle Green; 23 Jamall Lee; 46 Rolly Lumbala; 35 Martell Mallett; 2 Ian Smart; Receivers: 8 Bret Anderson; 84 Emmanuel Arceneaux; 13 Ryan Grice-Mullen; 19 Paris Jackson; 81 Geroy Simon; 88 O'Neil Wilson	Offensive linemen: 55 Sherko Haji-Rasouli G; 61 Daren Heerspink T; 60 Jason Jimenez T; 57 Andrew Jones G; 62 Bobby Singh G; 68 Justin Sorensen G/T; 54 Dean Valli G/C; Defensive linemen: 95 Ricky Foley DE; 90 Aaron Hunt DT; 97 Brent Johnson DE; 79 Caesar Rayford DE; 98 Steve Williams DT; Special teams: 4 Paul McCallum K/P; 70 Dan McCullough LS; 10 Sean Whyte K/P	Linebackers: 45 Jason Arakgi; 11 JoJuan Armour; 6 Javier Glatt; 42 Anton McKenzie; 47 James Yurichuk; Defensive backs: 24 Korey Banks DH; 3 Tad Crawford S; 25 Jerome Dennis DH; 27 Lavar Glover CB; 31 Dante Marsh CB; 9 Barron Miles S; 21 Ryan Phillips DH; 17 Darren Toney CB; Inactive: 12 Zac Champion QB; 72 Jeremy Gibbs DT; 91 Nautyn McKay-Loescher DE; 16 Buck Pierce QB	Practice roster: 18 Michael Bumpus WR; 69 Damane Duckett T; 51 Steve Faoro LS; 76 Alan Harper DT; 83 Greg Hetherington SB; 96 Scott McCuaig DE; 20 Mike McEachern S; 89 Terrence Scott WR; Injured list: 37 Alexis Bwenge RB; 43 Trestin George CB; 67 Jon Hameister-Ries G/T; 64 Angus Reid C; Suspended list: Jason Jones WR; Robert Long WR; Anthony Russo WR; Italics indicate American players

=== Coaching staff ===
2009 BC Lions staff
Front office: Owner, President and CEO – David Braley; General manager – Wally Buono; Director of player personnel – Roy Shivers; Player personnel coordinator and assistant to gm – Neil McEvoy; Northwest regional scout – Jeff Smith; Head coaches: Head coach – Wally Buono; Offensive coaches: Offensive coordinator and offensive line – Dan Dorazio; Receivers – Jacques Chapdelaine; Quarterbacks – Steff Kruck; Running backs – Chuck McMann	Defensive coaches: Defensive coordinator and linebackers – Mike Benevides; Defensive line – Mike Roach; Defensive backs – Mark Washington; Special teams coaches: Special teams coordinator – Chuck McMann; → 2009 Coaching staff

== Player stats ==
=== Passing ===
Player	Att.	Comp	%	Yards	TD	INT	Rating
Buck Pierce	315	199	63.2%	2272	10	12	79.5
Jarious Jackson	155	90	58.1%	1252	12	8	88.4
Casey Printers	68	43	63.2%	686	3	2	99.3
Travis Lulay	36	22	61.1%	324	2	2	85.9
Zac Champion	28	8	28.6%	70	0	4	−23.2
Paul McCallum	1	0	0.0%	0	0	0	2.1

=== Rushing ===
Player	Att.	Yards	Avg.	TD	Fumbles
Martell Mallett	214	1240	5.8	6	2
Buck Pierce	39	276	7.1	1	6
Jarious Jackson	32	143	4.5	2	5
A.J. Harris	33	141	4.3	1	0
Travis Lulay	17	133	7.8	0	0
Casey Printers	10	58	5.8	0	0
Ryan Grice-Mullen	8	42	5.3	2	3
Ian Smart	5	26	5.2	0	0

=== Receiving ===
Player	No.	Yards	Avg.	Long	TD
Geroy Simon	79	1239	15.7	62	6
Paris Jackson	76	1042	13.7	57	8
Emmanuel Arceneaux	63	858	13.6	60	7
O'Neil Wilson	35	405	11.6	33	1
Martell Mallett	43	342	8.0	26	2
Ryan Grice-Mullen	20	210	10.5	27	1
Rufus Skillern	15	182	12.1	46	0

== Awards and records ==
- CFL's Most Outstanding Canadian Award – Ricky Foley, DE
- CFL's Most Outstanding Rookie Award – Martell Mallett, RB
- Commissioner's Award – Wally Buono

=== 2009 CFL All-Stars ===
- DB – Korey Banks, CFL All-Star
- S – Barron Miles, CFL All-Star

=== Western Division All-Star selections ===
- RB – Martell Mallett, CFL Western All-Star
- SB – Geroy Simon, CFL Western All-Star
- ST – Jason Arakgi, CFL Western All-Star
- DT – Aaron Hunt, CFL Western All-Star
- LB – Anton McKenzie, CFL Western All-Star
- DB – Korey Banks, CFL Western All-Star
- S – Barron Miles, CFL Western All-Star

=== Milestones ===
- Barron Miles recorded his 13th career blocked kick, on a convert attempt by Saskatchewan, on Aug 7, 2009 to become the leader in that category.
- On Sept 19, 2009, head coach Wally Buono became the all-time most winningest coach in CFL history after a victory over the Toronto Argonauts.
- On Nov 6, 2009, Barron Miles recorded his 66th career interception, tying Larry Highbaugh for second all time, finishing the season 21 behind Less Browne.

== Playoffs ==
=== Schedule ===
Week	Game	Date	Time	Opponent	Score	Result	Attendance
20	East Semi-Final	Nov 15	10:00 AM PST	at Hamilton Tiger-Cats	34–27 (OT)	Win	27,430
21	East Final	Nov 22	10:00 AM PST	at Montreal Alouettes	56–18	Loss	53,792

# Games played with white uniforms.

=== Bracket ===
November 15: Division Semifinals
East
W4	BC Lions	34*
E2	Hamilton Tiger-Cats	27
West
W3	Edmonton Eskimos	21
W2	Calgary Stampeders	24

November 22: Division Finals
W4	BC Lions	18
E1	Montreal Alouettes	56
W2	Calgary Stampeders	17
W1	Saskatchewan Roughriders	27

November 29: 97th Grey Cup; McMahon Stadium – Calgary
E1	Montreal Alouettes	28
W1	Saskatchewan Roughriders	27

*-Team won in Overtime.

=== East Semi-Final ===
Date and time: Sunday, November 15, 10:00 AM Pacific Standard Time
Venue: Ivor Wynne Stadium, Hamilton, Ontario

Team	Q1	Q2	Q3	Q4	OT	Total
BC Lions	3	13	7	4	7	34
Hamilton Tiger-Cats	3	3	10	11	0	27

=== East Final ===
Date and time: Sunday, November 22, 10:00 AM Pacific Standard Time
Venue: Olympic Stadium, Montreal, Quebec

Team	Q1	Q2	Q3	Q4	Total
BC Lions	3	8	7	0	18
Montreal Alouettes	17	14	14	11	56
