= 2010 Hamilton Tiger-Cats season =

Season of Canadian Football League team the Hamilton Tiger-Cats

- General manager: Bob O'Billovich
- Head coach: Marcel Bellefeuille
- Home stadium: Ivor Wynne Stadium

Results
- Record: 9–9
- Division place: 2nd, East
- Playoffs: Lost East Semi-Final
- Team MOP: Kevin Glenn
- Team MOC: Dave Stala
- Team MOR: Marcus Thigpen

Uniform

The 2010 Hamilton Tiger-Cats season was the 53rd season for the team in the Canadian Football League (CFL) and their 61st overall. The Tiger-Cats succeeded in making a second straight playoff appearance, as well as hosting a second straight playoff game, but lost the East Semi-Final to the Toronto Argonauts.

== Offseason ==
=== CFL draft ===
Round	Pick	Player	Position	School/Club team
3	19	Samuel Fournier	RB	Laval
3	22	Eddie Steele	DT	Manitoba
4	27	Chris Rwabukamba	DB	Duke
5	36	Justin Palardy	K/P	Saint Mary's

== Preseason ==
Week	Date	Opponent	Score	Result	Attendance	Record
A	Sun, June 13	at Toronto Argonauts	13–10	Loss	12,514	0–1
B	Sun, June 20	Winnipeg Blue Bombers	38–20	Win	19,645	1–1

== Regular season ==
=== Season standings ===
East Division
Pos	Team	Pld	W	L	T	PF	PA	PD	Pts
1	Montreal Alouettes (C, Q)	18	12	6	0	521	475	+46	24
2	Hamilton Tiger-Cats (Q)	18	9	9	0	481	450	+31	18
3	Toronto Argonauts (Q)	18	9	9	0	373	442	−69	18
4	Winnipeg Blue Bombers	18	4	14	0	464	485	−21	8

Source: "2010 Regular Season Standings". Canadian Football League. Archived from the original on 2011-08-08.
(C) First round bye; (Q) Qualified for playoffs

=== Season schedule ===
Week	Date	Opponent	Score	Result	Attendance	Record
1	Fri, July 2	at Winnipeg Blue Bombers	49–29	Loss	26,302	0–1
2	Sat, July 10	Calgary Stampeders	23–22	Loss	25,248	0–2
3	Fri, July 16	Winnipeg Blue Bombers	28–7	Win	21,408	1–2
4	Thurs, July 22	at Montreal Alouettes	37–14	Loss	25,012	1–3
5	Sat, July 31	at Saskatchewan Roughriders	37–24	Loss	30,048	1–4
6	Sat, Aug 7	Winnipeg Blue Bombers	29–22	Win	23,653	2–4
7	Fri, Aug 13	at Winnipeg Blue Bombers	39–28	Win	27,892	3–4
8	Fri, Aug 20	at Toronto Argonauts	16–12	Win	24,493	4–4
9	Bye					4–4
10	Mon, Sept 6	Toronto Argonauts	28–13	Win	30,319	5–4
11	Sat, Sept 11	Montreal Alouettes	27–6	Loss	23,452	5–5
12	Sat, Sept 18	at BC Lions	35–31	Win	21,481	6–5
13	Sat, Sept 25	Saskatchewan Roughriders	32–25	Loss	23,108	6–6
14	Sun, Oct 3	at Edmonton Eskimos	37–35	Loss	34,479	6–7
15	Fri, Oct 8	Edmonton Eskimos	36–11	Win	20,791	7–7
16	Fri, Oct 15	at Toronto Argonauts	30–3	Win	25,181	8–7
17	Fri, Oct 22	Montreal Alouettes	40–3	Win	23,118	9–7
18	Fri, Oct 29	at Calgary Stampeders	55–24	Loss	27,644	9–8
19	Sat, Nov 6	BC Lions	23–21	Loss	23,913	9–9

== Roster ==
2010 Hamilton Tiger-Cats final roster
Quarterbacks: 5 Kevin Glenn; 12 Quinton Porter; 4 Adam Tafralis; Running backs: 0 Darcy Brown; 14 DeAndra' Cobb; 8 Marcus Thigpen; Receivers: 87 Chris Bauman; 86 Matt Carter; 15 Glenn MacKay; 85 Maurice Mann; 6 Marquay McDaniel; 81 Steve Schmidt; 88 Dave Stala; 18 Willie Thornton	Offensive linemen: 67 Peter Dyakowski G; 66 Alexandre Gauthier T; 62 Marwan Hage C; 60 Jason Jimenez T; 57 Brian Ramsay T/G; 65 Simeon Rottier G/T; Defensive linemen: 55 Stevie Baggs DE; 90 Demonte' Bolden DT; 95 Justin Hickman DE; 93 Matt Kirk DT; 71 Garrett McIntyre DT/DE; 99 Jermaine Reid DT; Special teams: 4 Sandro DeAngelis K; 51 Jordan Matechuk LS; 11 Eric Wilbur P/K	Linebackers: 39 Agustín Barrenechea; 48 Yannick Carter; 35 Otis Floyd; 21 Kyries Hebert; 28 Jamall Johnson; 25 Markeith Knowlton; 44 Ray Mariuz; Defensive backs: 20 Dylan Barker; 3 Marc Beswick; 27 Jerome Dennis; 23 Will Heyward; 34 Ryan Hinds; 41 Jonathan Hood; 2 Jason Shivers; 9 Geoff Tisdale	Reserve roster: 4 Arland Bruce SB; 37 Shannon James DB; 98 Eddie Steele DT; Practice roster: 16 Jason Boltus QB; 11 Conte Cuttino RB; 53 Mark Dewit C/G; 72 Jeremy Gibbs DT; 58 James Hargrave LB; 38 A. J. Harris RB; 24 Ellis Lankster DB; 92 Albert Smith DT; 32 Lenny Wicks DB; 80 Chris Williams WR	Injured list: 31 Jykine Bradley DB; 36 Isaac Brown LB; 52 George Hudson G/C; 56 Belton Johnson T; 84 Adam Nicolson WR; 7 Bo Smith DB; 26 Ray Wladichuk DB

Italics indicate International player

== Awards and records ==
=== CFL Eastern All-Stars ===
- WR – Arland Bruce III, CFL Eastern All-Star
- WR – Dave Stala, CFL Eastern All-Star
- OC – Marwan Hage, CFL Eastern All-Star
- LB – Markeith Knowlton, CFL Eastern All-Star

== Playoffs ==
=== Schedule ===
Week	Date	Time	Opponent	Score	Result	Attendance
20	Nov 14	1:00 PM EST	Toronto Argonauts	16–13	Loss	27,828

=== Bracket ===
November 14: Division Semi-Finals
E3	Toronto Argonauts	16
E2	Hamilton Tiger-Cats	13
W3	BC Lions	38
W2	Saskatchewan Roughriders	41*

November 21: Division Finals
E3	Toronto Argonauts	17
E1	Montreal Alouettes	48
W2	Saskatchewan Roughriders	20
W1	Calgary Stampeders	16

November 28: 98th Grey Cup; Commonwealth Stadium – Edmonton
E1	Montreal Alouettes	21
W2	Saskatchewan Roughriders	18

*-Team won in Overtime.

=== East Semi-Final ===
Toronto at Hamilton

Team	1	2	3	4	Total
• Argonauts	3	0	10	3	16
Tiger-Cats	0	6	0	7	13

- Date: November 14
- Location: Ivor Wynne Stadium
  Hamilton, ON
- Game start: 1:00 PM EST
- Game attendance: 27,828
- TV announcers (TSN): Rod Black (Play by Play), Duane Forde (Colour)
