= Kevin Glenn =

American gridiron football player (born 1979)

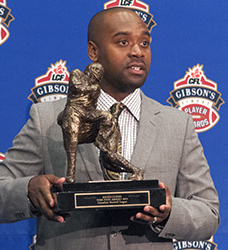
- Glenn with the Tom Pate Memorial Award

No. 5, 15, 2
- Position: Quarterback

Personal information
- Born: June 12, 1979 (age 47); Detroit, Michigan, U.S.
- Listed height: 5 ft 10 in (1.78 m)
- Listed weight: 198 lb (90 kg)

Career information
- High school: Detroit St. Martin de Porres
- College: Illinois State (1997–2000)
- NFL draft: 2001: undrafted

Career history
- 2001–2003: Saskatchewan Roughriders
- 2004: Toronto Argonauts*
- 2004–2008: Winnipeg Blue Bombers
- 2009–2011: Hamilton Tiger-Cats
- 2012–2013: Calgary Stampeders
- 2014: Ottawa Redblacks*
- 2014: BC Lions
- 2015: Saskatchewan Roughriders
- 2015–2016: Montreal Alouettes
- 2016: Winnipeg Blue Bombers
- 2017: Saskatchewan Roughriders
- 2018: Edmonton Eskimos
- * Offseason or practice squad member only

Awards and highlights
- Tom Pate Memorial Award (2011); Terry Evanshen Trophy (2007); CFL East All-Star (2007); CFL passing yards leader (2007)

Career CFL statistics
- Passing completions: 4,068
- Passing attempts: 6,434
- Percentage: 63.23
- TD–INT: 294–207
- Passing yards: 52,867
- Stats at CFL.ca

Kevin Glenn, Jr. (born June 12, 1979) is an American former professional football quarterback who played in the Canadian Football League (CFL) from 2001 to 2018. He played college football for the Illinois State Redbirds, and signed with the Saskatchewan Roughriders as an undrafted free agent in 2001. Glenn is a journeyman quarterback who is the only player to ever have had his rights held by every team in the CFL.

== Early life ==
Glenn was born on June 12, 1979, in Detroit. He played high school football at Detroit St. Martin de Porres.

== College career ==
Glenn played college football for the Illinois State Redbirds from 1997 to 2000, where he set 25 school records during his four years there. He completed 663 of 1,164 pass attempts (57.0%) for 8,251 yards, 62 touchdowns, and 39 interceptions, and also rushed 259 times for 611 yards and eight scores during his college career. He once tossed 101 straight passes without an interception and, in 1998, he led the Gateway Football Conference in passing yards per game, passer efficiency, and total offence. Glenn led Illinois State to its first playoff appearance in 1998.

== Professional career ==
=== Saskatchewan Roughriders (first stint) ===
Glenn originally signed with the Saskatchewan Roughriders on June 8, 2001. He appeared in 18 regular season games for Saskatchewan in the 2001 season, starting for six of those games. Glenn completed 70 of 154 pass attempts (45.5%) for 938 yards, two touchdowns, and nine interceptions. He recorded 28 carries for 152 yards (5.4 yard average) and two touchdowns.

Glenn played in 11 regular season games in the 2002 season as well as the 2002 East Division Semifinal. He started three games on the season. He completed 60 of 95 passes (63.2%) for 777 yards, three touchdowns, and three interceptions. He rushed 21 times for 83 yards and one touchdown.

Glenn entered free agency on February 17, 2003, but re-signed with the Roughriders on March 21, 2003. He dressed for all 18 regular-season games in the 2003 season plus the 2003 West Division Semifinal and the 2003 West Division Final. Glenn completed 40 of his 73 pass attempts (54.8%) for 508 yards, one touchdown, and four interceptions. He also rushed 13 times for 48 yards and a 3.7 yard average.

=== Toronto Argonauts ===
On May 19, 2004, the Roughriders traded Glenn to the Toronto Argonauts for their best selection (third overall) in the 2005 CFL draft, however later in the day, Glenn was traded to the Winnipeg Blue Bombers for their best selection in that draft (also the third overall selection).

=== Winnipeg Blue Bombers (first stint) ===
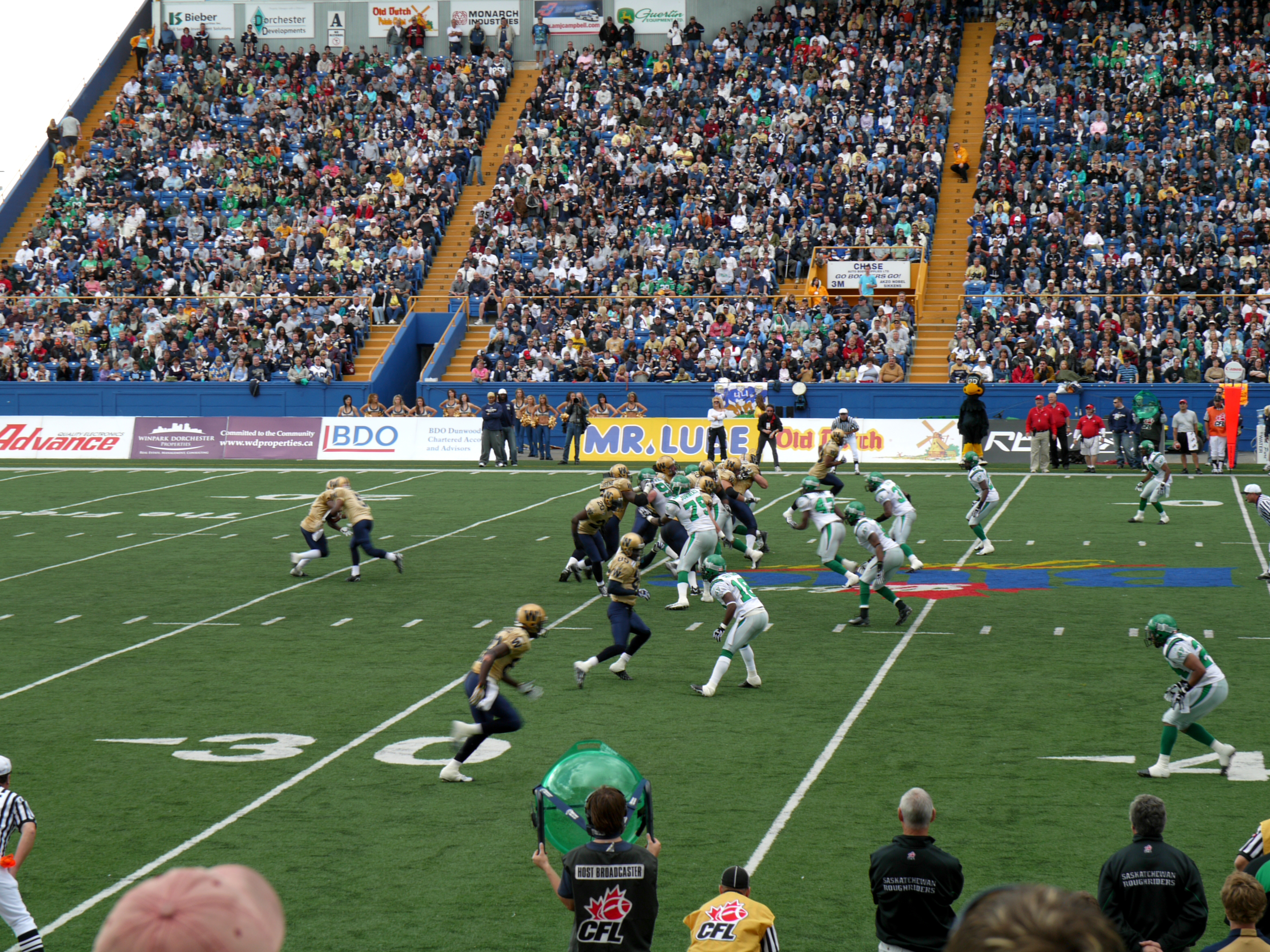
Glenn (left) handing the ball off in 2007 during a Blue Bombers game

In the 2004 season, Glenn played back-up to Khari Jones until Jones was traded mid-season. In 8 games that season, Glenn passed for 2,329 yards, 14 touchdowns, and eight interceptions on 274 attempts and 166 completions. He also rushed 30 times for 125 yards and two touchdowns. That season the Bombers finished with a disappointing record of 7–11, missing the playoffs

The 2005 season was more successful for Glenn. Despite missing three games due to injury, Glenn had his best season as a Bomber. He completed 231 of 403 pass attempts (57.3%) for 3,571 yards and 27 touchdowns. His 27 TD passes was third best in the CFL. He also rushed for one touchdown on October 10 versus the B.C. Lions. That October 10 game at Canad Inns Stadium was arguably Glenn's best single-game performance of his CFL career. He passed for 410 yards and five touchdowns, including four TD completions to slotback Milt Stegall. Glenn would go on to surpass the 300-yard passing mark on five occasions in 2005. Despite impressive numbers from Glenn, the Bombers finished 5–13.

The 2006 season was a year of great growth for Kevin. Though working in a brand new offensive system under new head coach Doug Berry, Glenn performed admirably. In a Week 8 game, Glenn slightly tore his ACL, but returned to the field to play his former team the Saskatchewan Roughriders in their Labour Day tilt. Glenn managed to lead the Bombers to their first playoff appearance in two years.

Glenn emerged as one of the CFL's elite quarterbacks during the 2007 season. By week 7, Glenn had the league's best quarterback rating (107.3), and had thrown for 2078 yards and 11 touchdowns (with only 3 interceptions). However, by the end of the 2007 season, Glenn's quarterback rating had fallen to 93.2, making him 5th amongst starting quarterbacks, in the 8 team CFL. Glenn led Winnipeg to the 95th Grey Cup with a win in the East Division final defeating Toronto 19–9 before leaving the game due to a broken arm and causing him to miss the Grey Cup game, which the Bombers would ultimately lose.

The 2008 Winnipeg Blue Bombers season started out poorly for Glenn with 976 yards, 2 touchdowns, 8 interceptions, a QB Rating of only 65.9, and 4 losses in 4 starts. He then lost his job to Ryan Dinwiddie who guided the team to their first win. After Dinwiddie led the team to its first win, he started struggling and lost his next game and Glenn was given his job back. Glenn and the Bombers became the first team in CFL history to host and lose a playoff-crossover match. In the off-season, quarterback Stefan LeFors was traded by Edmonton to Winnipeg in exchange for draft picks. Glenn was subsequently released on March 9, 2009.

=== Hamilton Tiger-Cats ===
Glenn signed with the Hamilton Tiger-Cats on March 20, 2009. He began the 2009 season as the backup to Quinton Porter, but after Porter struggled during the season, Glenn took over as the starting quarterback. Glenn led the Ti-Cats to their first postseason appearance since 2004 with a record of 9–9. Hamilton was eliminated in overtime in the first round by the crossover BC Lions. In his second year as the starter Glenn led the Tiger-Cats to another 9–9 season this time to lose to the Toronto Argonauts in the first round.

After a very strong year in 2010, Glenn saw his production decrease in 2011, throwing the same number of interceptions (17), but 13 fewer touchdowns. Head coach Marcel Bellefeuille elected to use a two-quarterback system for portions of the season which had Glenn sharing snaps with Quinton Porter. However, Glenn managed to lead the Hamilton Tiger-Cats to the playoffs for the third consecutive season with a record of 8–10 by starting 17 regular season games.

=== Calgary Stampeders ===
On January 3, 2012, Glenn was traded to the Calgary Stampeders along with Mark Dewit and a conditional draft pick for Henry Burris. Glenn was brought in by the Stamps to serve as a backup for starter Drew Tate. When Tate went down with a major injury in week 2 Glenn became the starter. Kevin Glenn went on to start the next 15 games for the Stampeders, winning 10 of them. His 67.9 percent completion rate during the 2012 campaign was the best of his career to that point. Tate returned from injury and went back to starting status for the final two games of the regular season and the Western Division Semi-Finals. When Tate sustained a different injury in the Western Semi-Final, Glenn became the starter for the remainder of the 2012 playoffs. Glenn led the Stamps to victory over the BC Lions in the Western Final, but was unable to defeat the Toronto Argonauts in the 100th Grey Cup, losing 35–22. During the 2012 season, Glenn passed Dieter Brock on the CFL's all time passing yardage chart, surpassing Brock's total of 35,025 yards.

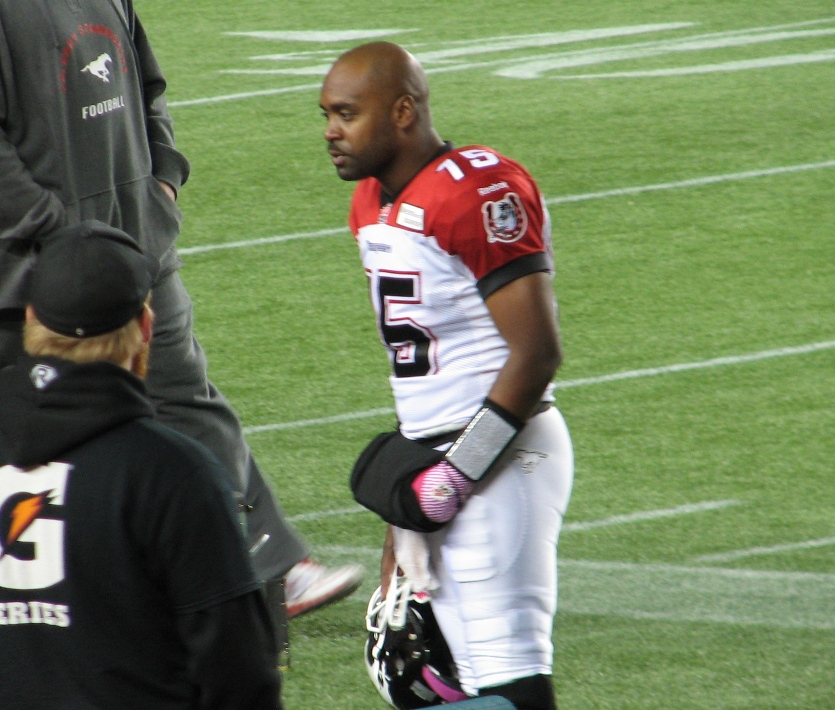
Glenn, shown on the sidelines during the Stampeders' final game against Edmonton for the 2013 season on October 18. During the game, Glenn passed Tom Clements to become Number 10 on the CFL's all time passing list.

Glenn returned to the Stamps for the 2013 CFL season once again as a backup to Drew Tate. In similar fashion to the previous year Glenn came in relief of an injured Tate in Week 2 and was named the starter for Week 3 against the Alouettes due to Tate's injury. Kevin Glenn started in Week 3 and 4 against the Montreal Alouettes, however, he was unable to finish the Week 4 game due to sustaining an elbow injury in the 3rd-quarter, sustained while taking a hit completing a 45-yard pass to Marquay McDaniel. On October 18, 2013, Glenn passed Tom Clements to become the 10th all-time leading quarterback in terms of passing yards. Glenn played a total of 15 of the 18 regular season games in 2013, leading the Stamps to a league best record of 14–4, earning a first round bye. In the West-Final Glenn was pulled after the first half after struggling against the Roughriders. The Stamps lost the game, ending their season.

=== Ottawa Redblacks ===
On December 16, 2013, Glenn was drafted by the Ottawa Redblacks in the 2013 CFL Expansion Draft. Prior to the start of CFL free agency, the RedBlacks signed Henry Burris and named him the starter, leaving Glenn once again relegated to a backup role. On March 6, 2014, Glenn announced that he had requested to be traded, something he had discussed with the RedBlacks front office since the signing of Burris on February 4. Ottawa GM Marcel Desjardins had said that he would not release Glenn.

=== BC Lions ===
On May 13, 2014, Glenn was traded to the BC Lions during the 2014 CFL draft in exchange for the fifth overall pick in that draft. With Travis Lulay suffering a major injury, Glenn started in 17 of the 18 regular season games, and also in the Eastern Semi-Final. Based on QB passer rating statistic, the 2014 season was Glenn's worst passing season since his 2008 campaign with the Blue Bombers. The Lions finished the season fourth in the West Division, but qualified for the playoffs by virtue of the "crossover" rule and the fact their 9–9 record was better than the 3rd-best team in the East. The Lions lost the East Division Semi-Final by a score of 50–17 and head coach Mike Benevides was fired less than a week later despite having had his contract extended to 2016. Glenn was not re-signed by the Lions and became a free agent on February 10, 2015.

=== Saskatchewan Roughriders (second stint) ===
On February 19, 2015, Glenn signed with the Saskatchewan Roughriders, returning him to the team where he began his professional career. Glenn was the backup quarterback on the depth chart and saw action in the first game of the season, when starting quarterback Darian Durant suffered a leg injury. It was revealed after the game that Durant had suffered a torn Achilles tendon, ending his season and making Glenn the starter. Glenn learned Chapdelaine's offensive scheme quickly and excelled, making Saskatchewan's offense the best in the league though the first four games of the season (all losses). Glenn played in 9 games for the Riders but the team struggled and quickly fell out of playoff contention.

=== Montreal Alouettes ===
On trade deadline day for the 2015 season (October 14, 2015), Glenn was traded by the Roughriders to the Montreal Alouettes, in exchange for a fifth-round pick in the 2016 CFL draft. At the time of the trade, the Alouettes had a record of 5–9 tying them for the crossover playoff spot; whereas the Roughriders season was over after they had been officially eliminated from post-season contention. Glenn played in three of the final four games for the Alouettes to close out the season, however, he was not able to earn Montreal a playoff berth, losing the crossover to the BC Lions.

Glenn began the 2016 season as the starting quarterback on a crowded depth chart that included the likes of; Rakeem Cato, Vernon Adams, Brandon Bridge and Jonathan Crompton. Glenn started the first two games of the season of the Alouettes, had a bye for the third week and missed the fourth week with an eye infection. Glenn started nine of the team's first ten games of the season, but only managed to win three of them. As a result, head coach Jim Popp announced Rakeem Cato would be the starting quarterback in Week 12, relegating Glenn to the backup role.

=== Winnipeg Blue Bombers (second stint) ===
On September 11, 2016, Glenn was traded to the Winnipeg Blue Bombers to serve as the back-up for Matt Nichols. He dressed for seven games for the Bombers while playing in one, completing two of his four pass attempts for 16 yards. Unable to come to terms on a new contract, the Bombers released Glenn about a month before he was set to become a free agent.

=== Saskatchewan Roughriders (third stint) ===
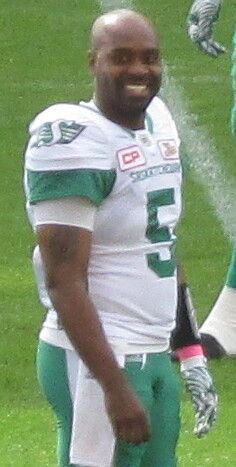
Glenn with the Roughriders in 2017

On January 23, 2017, Glenn signed a contract with the Saskatchewan Roughriders. During training camp and preseason Glenn beat out Canadian quarterback Brandon Bridge, second year quarterback Bryan Bennett and former NFL quarterback Vince Young for the starting job: The latter two were released before the start of the season. Glenn was the Riders starting quarterback for most of the 2017 season, however in the last third of the season he began splitting snaps with Brandon Bridge. In early August Glenn surpassed Ron Lancaster moving into sixth place on the CFL's all-time passing yards list. On September 29, 2017, in his 197th game as a starting quarterback, Glenn recorded his 100th win (tying Matt Dunigan for the eight most all-time). Overall Glenn had a solid season for the Riders, leading the team to a 10–8 record and qualifying for the East division playoff via crossover. On January 3, 2018, the Riders acquired quarterback Zach Collaros. The following day, they announced they had released Glenn.

=== Edmonton Eskimos ===
On January 15, 2018, the Edmonton Eskimos announced that they had signed Glenn to a one-year contract. Glenn's rights had now been held by every team in the CFL. On September 29, 2018, while serving as the backup quarterback to Mike Reilly, Glenn dressed for his 300th CFL game; trailing only Damon Allen (370) and Anthony Calvillo (329) for most games dressed by a quarterback.

On June 12, 2019, his 40th birthday, Glenn retired from his playing career.

With the potential revival of the Atlantic Schooners as the 10th CFL team, Glenn has joked that he may want to come out of retirement to sign a one-day contract with them to continue to hold on to his unique claim of having been part of every CFL team. In a straw poll, Schooner fans (in advance of the teams 2018 revival announcement prior to the 106th Grey Cup) said that they would want Glenn as a QB selection in an expansion draft if the team's revival comes to fruition. Mid-way through the 2019 season the Blue Bombers (7–2 at the time) contacted Glenn to see if he was interested in coming out of retirement following an injury to starting quarterback Matt Nichols; however, Glenn declined the offer although he did consider it "very tempting".

== Coaching career ==
From 2020 to 2022 Glenn was an assistant coach at Detroit Catholic Central High School. While an assistant coach at CC, the team had an overall record of 25–7. In May 2023 it was announced that Glenn had been hired as the head coach of the football team at University Liggett School. He led Liggett to a 7–3 record and a playoff appearance. About a year later, in May of 2024, Glenn was announced as the head coach of the football team at University of Detroit Jesuit High School and Academy.

== Career statistics ==
=== CFL ===
==== Regular season ====
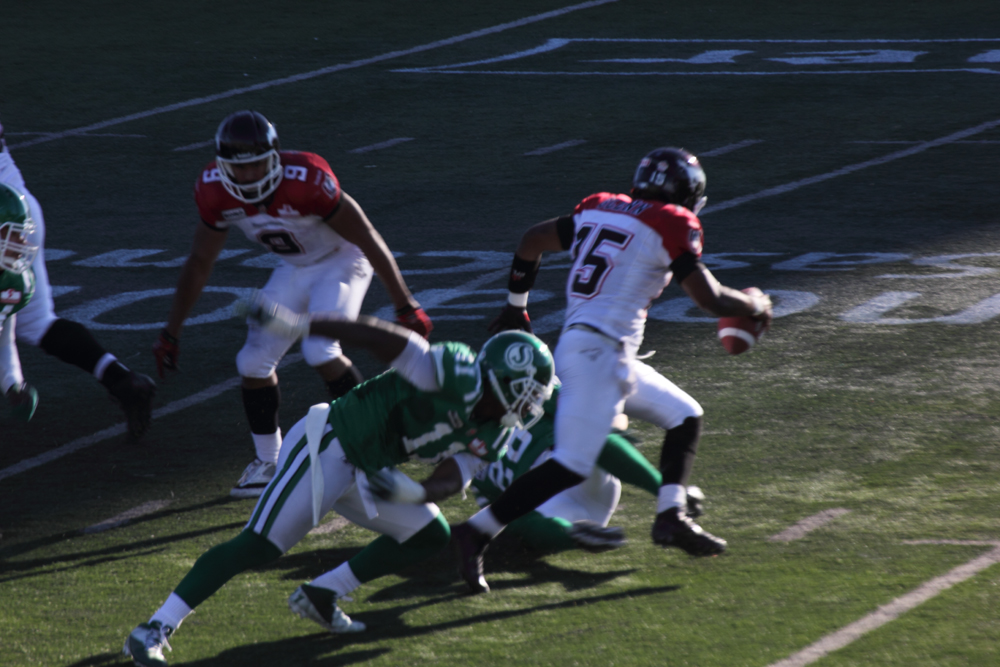
Glenn evading the rush in 2012

Games				Passing							Rushing					
Year	Team	G (Note: Games dressed)	GS	Cmp	Att	Pct	Yards	TD	Int	Rate	Att	Yards	Avg	Long	TD	Fumb
2001	SSK	18	6	70	154	45.5	938	2	9	45.3	28	152	5.4	20	2	3
2002	SSK	11	3	60	95	63.2	777	3	3	86.2	21	83	4.0	20	1	4
2003	SSK	18	2	40	73	54.8	508	1	4	58.5	13	48	3.7	11	0	1
2004	WPG	18	9	166	274	60.6	2,329	14	8	92.9	30	125	4.2	17	2	2
2005	WPG	15	15	231	403	57.3	3,571	27	17	91.5	30	103	3.4	18	1	3
2006	WPG	16	16	249	430	57.9	3,427	17	13	84.1	40	194	4.9	15	2	3
2007	WPG	18	18	388	621	62.5	5,117	25	13	93.2	41	132	3.2	14	0	5
2008	WPG	18	15	293	454	64.5	3,637	20	20	85.6	29	102	3.5	13	0	3
2009	HAM	18	7	241	389	62.0	3,077	18	7	94.6	21	134	6.4	22	2	3
2010	HAM	18	18	388	602	64.5	5,100	33	17	97.6	27	185	6.9	22	0	4
2011	HAM	18	17	307	488	62.9	3,963	19	17	86.8	21	112	5.3	15	1	2
2012	CGY	18	15	325	487	66.7	4,220	25	16	97.2	20	120	6.0	16	0	7
2013	CGY	18	13	223	335	66.6	2,710	18	7	100.5	14	77	5.5	13	0	4
2014	BC	18	17	302	479	63.0	3,918	17	17	85.7	16	105	6.6	19	1	3
2015	SSK	9	8	171	257	66.5	2,174	9	10	88.2	10	40	4.0	8	0	2
2015	MTL	3	3	71	106	67.0	756	7	4	93.9	3	14	4.7	10	0	1
2016	MTL	10	9	222	314	70.7	2,547	13	11	94.0	10	57	5.7	16	1	3
2016	WPG	7	0	2	4	50.0	16	0	0	60.4	0	0	0	0	0	0
2017	SSK	17	17	318	468	67.9	4,038	25	14	100.0	21	75	3.6	11	2	3
2018	EDM	18	0	0	0	0	0	0	0	0	0	0	0	0	0	0
CFL totals		304	208	4,068	6,434	63.2	52,867	294	207	90.8	395	1,858	4.7	22	13	56

==== Postseason ====
Playoffs				Passing					Rushing		
Year	Game	GP	GS	Att	Cmp	Yards	TD	Int	Att	Yards	TD
2002	*East Semi-Final	1	0	0	–	–	–	–	0	–	–
2003	West Semi-Final	1	0	0	–	–	–	–	0	–	–
2003	West Final	1	0	23	16	208	1	0	0	–	–
2006	East Semi-Final	1	1	22	12	224	1	2	3	21	0
2007	East Semi-Final	1	1	31	19	161	1	2	3	12	0
2007	East Final	1	1	21	15	201	1	0	0	–	–
2008	East Semi-Final	1	1	34	15	233	1	1	2	2	0
2009	East Semi-Final	1	1	51	31	434	2	0	1	2	0
2010	East Semi-Final	1	1	35	24	314	0	2	0	–	–
2011	East Semi-Final	1	1	32	23	275	1	1	0	–	–
2011	East Final	1	1	18	13	113	0	0	1	5	0
2012	West Semi-Final	1	0	0	–	–	–	–	0	–	–
2012	West Final	1	1	24	15	303	3	1	1	15	0
2013	West Final	1	1	13	7	185	0	2	0	–	–
2014	*East Semi-Final	1	1	18	6	64	0	2	0	–	–
2016	West Semi-Final	1	0	0	–	–	–	–	0	–	–
2017	*East Semi-Final	1	1	28	18	252	1	0	3	10	1
2017	*East Final	1	1	13	6	87	0	3	0	–	–
CFL totals		18	13	363	220	3,054	12	16	14	67	1

*Team qualified for Crossover

==== Grey Cup ====
Grey Cup				Passing					Rushing		
Year	Team	GP	GS	Att	Cmp	Yards	TD	Int	Att	Yards	TD
2007	WPG	0	–	–	–	–	–	–	–	–	–
2012	CGY	1	1	27	14	222	0	1	0	–	–
CFL totals		1	1	27	14	222	0	1	0	-	-

=== College ===
Year	Team	Passing					Rushing		
Year	Team	Cmp	Att	Yds	TD	Int	Att	Yds	TD
1997	Illinois State	191	361	2,265	12	13	99	90	1
1998	Illinois State	249	407	3,037	26	11	77	258	3
1999	Illinois State	110	174	1,200	10	2	36	160	4
2000	Illinois State	113	222	1,749	14	13	47	103	0
Career		663	1,164	8,251	62	39	259	611	8

== See also ==
- List of gridiron football quarterbacks passing statistics
