= John Hashem =

Canadian football player (born 1987)

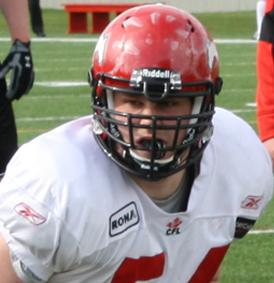
- Hashem in 2009

Profile
- Position: Offensive tackle

Personal information
- Born: May 15, 1987 (age 39); Regina, Saskatchewan, Canada
- Listed height: 6 ft 7 in (2.01 m)
- Listed weight: 285 lb (129 kg)

Career information
- University: Regina
- CFL draft: 2009: 3rd round

Career history
- 2009: Calgary Stampeders*
- 2010: Winnipeg Blue Bombers*
- 2011–2012: Montreal Alouettes
- * Offseason or practice squad member only

John Hashem (born May 15, 1987) is a Canadian former professional football offensive tackle. In 2010, he was signed by the Winnipeg Blue Bombers but was eventually released. He was drafted by the Calgary Stampeders in the third round of the 2009 CFL draft. He played CIS football for the Regina Rams and was briefly on the roster for the Saskatchewan Roughriders

== College career ==
Hashem played his college football for the Regina Rams. He started 16 consecutive games at Right tackle for Regina over the past two seasons. In 2007, the work of Hashem and his stellar offensive line colleagues allowed the Rams to lead Canada West with a 32.1 points-per-game average. In 2008, he blocked for conference-leading passer Teale Orban. In 2009 and 2010, he blocked for the Can-West Superstar quarterback Marc Mueller. During his time on the Rams in 2009-2010, John played with 2011-2012 CIS First Team All Canadian Brett Jones .

== Professional career ==
Hashem was drafted by the Calgary Stampeders in 2009, he was signed by the Winnipeg Blue Bombers in 2010. Then, he was on the Montreal Alouettes roster in 2011 and attended the team's training camp in 2012. He now runs a poker health site Highstakehealth

== Coaching career ==
After playing, John started coaching at Leboldus High School in Regina. His roles including Offensive Line Coach, Special Teams Coordinator and Offensive Coordinator. From 2011-2016 the team won 5 consecutive provincial championships. In 2017 and 2018 the team lost in the city finals. In 2019 John joined the University of Regina Rams as an Offensive Line Coach.

== Poker ==
John has had numerous successes in live poker tournaments. His most recent success was placing 98th out of 8600 players in the 2019 World Series of Poker Main event. Later that fall he placed first place in the SIGA Poker Championship in Saskatoon.

== Personal life ==
Hashem was born in Regina, Saskatchewan to Shannon Hashem (a biochemist) and Simon Hashem (an engineer). He studied software engineering at the University of Regina while playing on the university’s football team, Regina Rams . He graduated in 2009 and started his professional football career with the Calgary Stampeders. He is currently a coach with the University of Regina Rams, and a software engineer working as a web-developer.
