= John Kanaroski =

Canadian football player (born 1984)

Profile
- Position: Wide receiver

Personal information
- Born: December 23, 1984 (age 41); Calgary, Alberta
- Listed height: 5 ft 9 in (1.75 m)
- Listed weight: 170 lb (77 kg)

Career information
- University: Regina
- CFL draft: 2009: 6th round, 48th overall pick

Career history
- 2009: Calgary Stampeders*
- * Offseason or practice squad member only
- Stats at CFL.ca (archive)

John Kanaroski (born December 23, 1984) is a Canadian former professional football wide receiver. He was drafted by the Calgary Stampeders in the sixth round of the 2009 CFL draft. He played CIS football for the Regina Rams.
