= Peter Quinney =

Canadian football player (born 1986)

Profile
- Position: Fullback

Personal information
- Born: June 1, 1986 (age 40); Belleville, Ontario, Canada
- Listed height: 6 ft 1 in (1.85 m)
- Listed weight: 215 lb (98 kg)

Career information
- College: Wilfrid Laurier
- CFL draft: 2009: 5th round, 35th overall pick

Career history
- 2009: Winnipeg Blue Bombers*
- 2010: Toronto Argonauts
- * Offseason or practice squad member only
- Stats at CFL.ca

Peter Quinney (born June 1, 1986) is a Canadian former professional football fullback. He was drafted by the Winnipeg Blue Bombers in the fifth round of the 2009 CFL draft. He played CIS football for the Wilfrid Laurier Golden Hawks.

On January 1, 2010, Peter was signed by the Toronto Argonauts. He was released by the Argonauts on September 16, 2010, but was re-signed by the Argonauts on November 2, 2010. On April 21, 2011, Quinney was released by the Argonauts.

Peter successfully completed teachers college at Wilfrid Laurier's Faculty of Education. He is currently employed as a full-time teacher.

== Early life ==
While at Laurier, he also played Slotback and Tight End. At the 2009 CFL E-Camp Quinney tied for first with 23 reps on the bench press. He played his high school football at Centennial Secondary School in Belleville, and also excelled in rugby and wrestling, winning multiple MVPs for all three sports.

While with the Kingston Grenadiers, Peter excelled and was the recipient of the prestigious coaches award in 2003.
