= Westshore Rebels =

Canadian junior football team

- Sport: Canadian football
- Founded: 1971
- League: Canadian Junior Football League
- Division: B.C. Football Conference
- Based in: Langford, British Columbia
- Stadium: Westhills Stadium
- Colours: Red, White, and Black
- Head coach: Connor Bryan

The Westshore Rebels are a Canadian junior football team based in Langford, British Columbia. The Rebels play in the B.C. Football Conference, which itself is part of the Canadian Junior Football League (CJFL) and competes annually for the national title known as the Canadian Bowl. The club has operated continuously since the late 1960s in Victoria, having previously been known as the Sharks, Payless, and the Hornets. The team rejoined the BCJFA in 1985 as the Victoria Payless, and changed the name to the Rebels in 1988. They were the BCFL champions in 2003.

== History ==
=== Victoria Dolphins ===
Victoria's contribution to the BCJFA officially began in 1971 when the Victoria Dolphins were admitted to the league. Under the direction of "Mr. Football", head coach Frank Hindle, they finished a very successful first year ending in third place with 3-3-1. The next season 1972, the team grabbed second spot behind the powerful Vancouver Meralomas, but unfortunately were defeated in the first ever BCJFA semi-final game, held in Victoria, by the North Shore Cougars. The Dolphins participated in the BCJFA from 1971 until 1979. In addition to Frank Hindle, who coached the team in 1971, '72, and '77, other Dolphin head coaches included Roy Vollinger (1973), Ken Werrun (1974, '75 and '76), Brian Gingell (1978), and Paul Shortt (1979). In 1979 Kym Clarke was the BCFC MVP. Following 1979 season the Dolphins ceased to be a part of the BCJFA.

=== Victoria Hornets ===
In 1985, the Victoria Hornets, who had been dominating the BCJFA Tier II league (players 18–20 years of age) under coach Frank Hindle, and were provincial champions in 1983 and '84, moved up and again became full members of the BCJFA at the Tier I level (players aged 22 and under).

=== Victoria Payless ===
In 1985 the team then became known as Victoria Payless (Payless Gas stepped in and sponsored the team, which helped cover the costs of playing at the new level). This first year back in junior was also the final year of coaching for Frank Hindle. The team managed a respectable fourth-place finish and grabbed the last playoff spot. However, were defeated in the semi-final game by the Richmond Raiders. Darryl Brassard, Bill Grant, Ted Leonard, Dan McLean and Murray Smith were named BCJFL All-Stars. A new head coach, Doug Ferne, took over in 1985 and the team failed to make the playoffs in '86, but with hard work by Doug and his staff in the off season, the 1987 team had a great year and finished in second place behind BC champs Okanagan Sun. This 1987 Payless club, for the first time in 15 years, hosted a BCJFA semi-final game against the Richmond Raiders, but were upset in a heart-breaker. In 1987 Ian Gordon was named the CJFL Outstanding Defensive player. Midway through the 1988 season coach Ferne stepped down and the head coaching role was assumed by Paul Shortt, who continued through until 1993. During Shortt's reign, Payless made the play-offs four of the six seasons. The four play-off years were from 1990-93. In 1990 Troy Francis was the CJFL top defensive player and 1992 Simon Beckow was named the CJFL top offensive player.

=== Vancouver Island Sharks ===
In 1994, Payless Gas withdrew their sponsorship of the team, and the team name was changed to the Vancouver Island Sharks. The new head coach was Rod Outhwaite, and although they finished in last place, the foundation was laid for a new era of football. 1995 saw new coach, Gerry Hornett, take over, and for the two years in which Gerry was the boss, the team registered identical records and fourth-place finishes. In 1997, the Sharks fielded a team half made up of rookies, and under new head coach John Hugi, who had been an assistant coach with the team for 6 years.

=== Victoria Rebels ===
During the off-season John Cardillicha was appointed head coach, and the team again changed its name and colours to reflect the new direction John wanted to take them. The 1998 Rebels improved steadily throughout the season, and finished in third place with a 6–4 record. While they lost in the first round of the playoffs, the season had to be considered a success, and the Rebels were looking forward to even better things in the future. 1999 brought more success with a second-place finish due to a 6–3-1 record and a CJFL defensive player MVP in Scott Gilbert (Mennie). After a promising win, the Rebels were out played by the Okanagan Sun in their first ever BCFC final. The 2000 season resulted in a 7–3 record and another CJFL defensive player MVP, thanks to the play of Mike Kissinger. The Rebels played the Okanagan Sun and lost in over-time and missed advancing to the Canadian Bowl by a 38–43 score.

John Cardillichia stepped down as head coach at the end of the 2002 season, Matt Bloker who had been an assistant coach assumed the head coaching role, and coached for 2003 and 2004 season before the team was moved to Nanaimo and renamed the Vancouver Island Raiders. On November 4, 2004 the club announced that the team's board of directors voted to move operations of the team to the city of Nanaimo for the 2005 season and beyond. However, at a special general meeting of the Vancouver Island Junior Football Society on December 21, the society reversed the vote to relocate to Nanaimo. The society then replaced the executive and board of directors with a new board of volunteers, and vowed to stay in Victoria.

Paul Orizatti assumed the head coach role and in 2005 helped start a new Rebels organization from the bottom floor up, and continued on as head coach until the end of the 2008 season.

In 2009 John Cardilicchia once again came on board as the coach of the Rebels and continued until 2012.

=== Westshore Rebels ===
During the 2010 off-season the Rebels changed its name to Westshore Rebels to encompass a re-branding and relocation to newly built Westhills Stadium. In 2013 Scott Mennie took over as head coach, and then had to step down before the start of the season. Tim Kearse stepped in as the interim head coach for the season and in 2014 Andrew Axhorn took over the helm as head coach for the season.

On March 4, 2011, the team was re-branded as the Westshore Rebels, as the team had played in the township of Langford for the previous two seasons. The team announced that they would continue playing their home games out of Bear Mountain Stadium. In 2014 the Canadian Junior Football League recognized the 2014 Rebels as having the Top Executive in Canadian Junior Football, led by team president Elise Pastro. The Rebels were also selected as the most Sportsman Like Team in the BCFC for their community outreach and professional conduct on and off the football field.

In January 2015 the Rebels announced new head coach JC Boice, who has various championship titles under his belt, held various NCAA roles and works full-time with National Football Academies. With this new visionary and a restructured executive board of directors, the organization refocused and reunited with a crisp logo, updated team colours and a renewed commitment to the Westshore community. With this new family support, JC recruited and retained top coaches and players from across Canada.

== Notable alumni ==
=== BC Lions ===
- Bill Chamberlain
- Mohammed Elewonibi
- Jordan Matechuk
- Jesse Newman
- Lorne Plante
- Jamel Lyles
- Kieran Poissant

=== Calgary Stampeders ===
- Tim O'Neill
- Jesse Newman
- Rob Cote
- John Bender

=== Edmonton Eskimos ===
- Greg Morris

=== Montreal Alouettes ===
- Scott Mennie
- Andrew Woodruff

=== Saskatchewan Roughriders ===
- Greg Morris
