= Greg Morris (Canadian football) =

Canadian football player (born 1992)

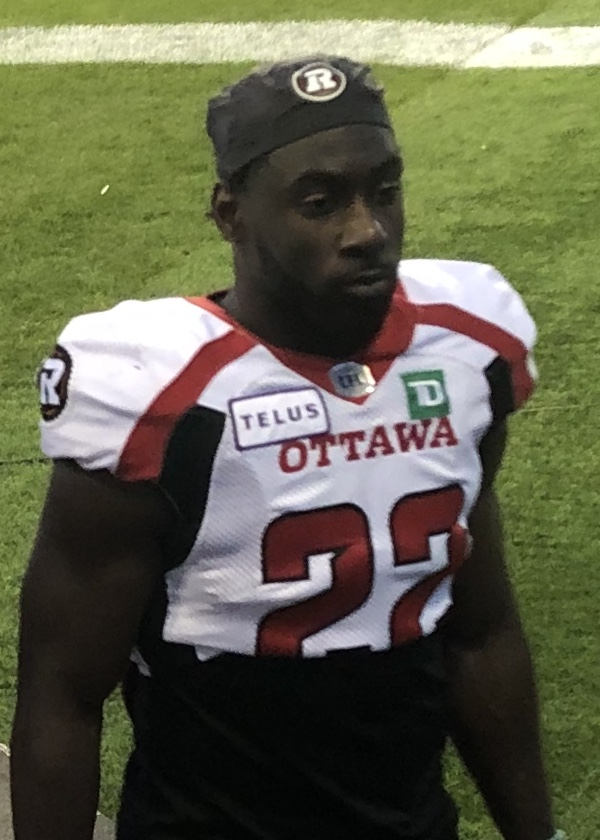
- Morris with the Ottawa Redblacks in 2019

No. 19, 22
- Position: Running back

Personal information
- Born: March 4, 1992 (age 34); Toronto, Ontario, Canada
- Listed height: 5 ft 11 in (1.80 m)
- Listed weight: 200 lb (91 kg)

Career information
- High school: Donald A. Wilson (Whitby, Ontario)
- CJFL: Westshore Rebels
- College: New Mexico Military

Career history
- 2015–2016: Edmonton Eskimos
- 2016–2017: Saskatchewan Roughriders
- 2018: Toronto Argonauts*
- 2018–2019: Ottawa Redblacks
- * Offseason or practice squad member only

Awards and highlights
- Grey Cup champion (2015)
- Stats at CFL.ca

Greg Morris (born March 4, 1992) is a Canadian former professional football running back who played in the Canadian Football League (CFL). He played college football at New Mexico Military Institute. He also played junior football for the Westshore Rebels of the Canadian Junior Football League (CJFL).

== Early life ==
Morris participated in basketball, track and football at Donald A Wilson Secondary School in Whitby, Ontario. He played running back and linebacker on the football team. He was named the school's senior athlete of the year.

== Junior football career ==
Morris played for the Westshore Rebels of the Canadian Junior Football League from 2011 to 2012. He earned B.C. Football Conference rookie of the year honors in 2011 after rushing for 1,064 yards and eight touchdowns. He set the single-game CJFL rushing record when he ran for 405 yards and four touchdowns on 24 attempts in an October 2012 game against Kamloops. Morris finished the 2012 season with a B.C. Football Conference-leading 1,496 rushing yards and garnered CJFL All-Canadian recognition. He earned Outstanding Offensive Back and B.C. Football Conference All-Star honors in 2012 as well.

== College career ==
Morris played in ten games for the New Mexico Military Institute Broncos in 2013, rushing for 995 yards and seven touchdowns on 151 attempts. He also caught eleven passes for 153 yards and one touchdown. He earned First Team All-WSFL accolades in 2013.

== Professional career ==
=== Edmonton Eskimos ===
Morris was signed to the Edmonton Eskimos' practice roster on August 17, 2015. He was promoted to the active roster on September 6 and played in nine games for the team during the 2015 season. The Eskimos won the 103rd Grey Cup against the Ottawa Redblacks by a score of 26–20 on November 29, 2015. He was released by the Eskimos on August 31, 2016.

=== Saskatchewan Roughriders ===
Morris was signed to the Saskatchewan Roughriders' practice roster on September 1, 2016, and promoted to the active roster on September 3. He played in nine games with the Roughriders, including one start at running back, recording 14 carries for 112 yards and one touchdown and he also had eight catches for 77 yards. In 2017, he played in all 18 regular season games and both post-season games. He had 14 carries for 66 rushing yards and one reception for 34 yards. He saw increased time on kickoff returns, posting career highs with 32 kickoff returns for 732 yards.

=== Toronto Argonauts ===
On February 15, 2018, Morris signed as a free agent with the Toronto Argonauts. He was released at the end of the 2018 training camp on June 11, 2018.

=== Ottawa Redblacks ===
On September 18, 2018, Morris was signed by the Ottawa Redblacks to their practice roster. He played in 16 regular season games over two seasons where he recorded 21 carries for 117 rushing yards and nine receptions for 54 receiving yards. He was released by the Redblacks on January 23, 2020.
