= Emmanuel Arceneaux =

American gridiron football player (born 1987)

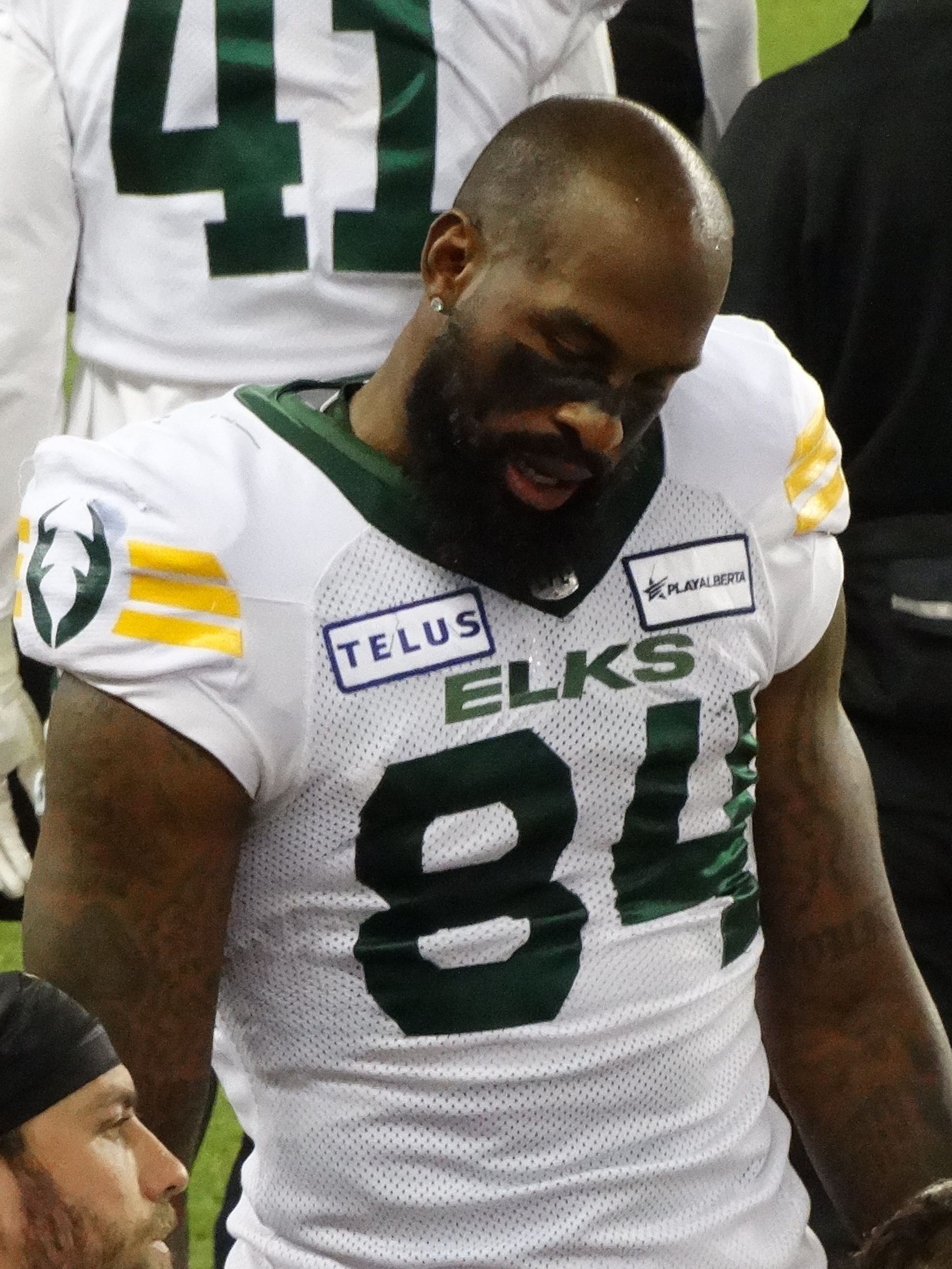
- Arceneaux with the Edmonton Elks in 2023

No. 84
- Position: Wide receiver

Personal information
- Born: September 17, 1987 (age 39); Alexandria, Louisiana, U.S.
- Listed height: 6 ft 2 in (1.88 m)
- Listed weight: 218 lb (99 kg)

Career information
- High school: Peabody Magnet (Alexandria)
- College: Alcorn State

Career history
- 2009–2010: BC Lions
- 2011: Minnesota Vikings
- 2012: Washington Redskins*
- 2013: New York Jets*
- 2013–2018: BC Lions
- 2019: Saskatchewan Roughriders
- 2021: Frisco Fighters
- 2022–2023: Edmonton Elks
- * Offseason or practice squad member only

Awards and highlights
- Tom Pate Memorial Award (2022); 2× CFL All-Star (2015, 2016); 3× CFL West All-Star (2014–2016)
- Stats at Pro Football Reference
- Stats at CFL.ca

Emmanuel "Manny" Arceneaux (born September 17, 1987) is an American former professional football wide receiver who played 11 seasons in the Canadian Football League (CFL) for the BC Lions, Saskatchewan Roughriders, and Edmonton Elks. He played college football for the Alcorn State Braves.

Arceneaux signed as an undrafted free agent with the Lions in 2009. He was also a member of the Minnesota Vikings, Washington Redskins, New York Jets, and Frisco Fighters.

== College career ==
While at Alcorn State University, Arceneaux maintained a 3.0 GPA and was president of the student-athlete advisory committee, while recording 99 career catches for 1,618 and 12 touchdowns for the Braves. He is a member of Alpha Phi Alpha fraternity.

== Professional career ==
=== BC Lions (first stint) ===
Arceneaux was signed to the BC Lions of the Canadian Football League (CFL) on May 19, 2009, and made the Lions' active roster after training camp. Arceneaux had an outstanding debut season, starting at the wide receiver position for all 18 games and recording 63 catches for 858 yards and seven touchdowns. He caught a touchdown pass in each of his first three games and had two 100-yard receiving games during the season. He led all receivers in the 2009 playoffs, recording 12 catches for 189 yards. He continued his strong play in 2010 by registering his first 1000-yard season while finishing second on the team in receiving yards and touchdowns.

=== Minnesota Vikings ===
On January 22, 2011, Arceneaux agreed to the terms on a three-year contract with the Minnesota Vikings. During the 2011 season, he played in three regular season games, catching one pass for 10 yards. On August 31, 2012, as the Vikings reduced their roster down to league maximum of 53 players, he was released.

=== Washington Redskins ===
On September 1, 2012, the Washington Redskins claimed Arceneaux off waivers and signed him to the practice squad.

=== New York Jets ===
Arceneaux was signed by the New York Jets to a reserve/future contract on January 2, 2013. He was waived on May 7, 2013.

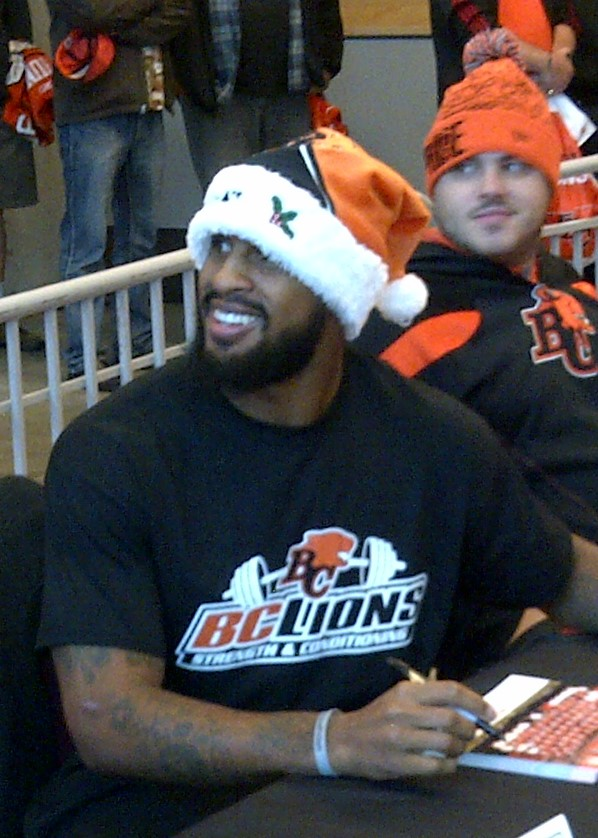
Arceneaux with the BC Lions in 2013

=== BC Lions (second stint) ===
On May 16, 2013, Arceneaux's agent announced that Arceneaux would be returning to CFL within a week. The Lions, Toronto Argonauts and Edmonton Eskimos were all believed to have interest in the free-agent. On May 21, 2013, it was officially announced that Arceneaux had signed with the Lions, with whom he had played two seasons with before going south to the NFL. The contract was reportedly a two-year, $280,000 deal. Arceneaux was fined an undisclosed amount by the CFL following a Week 4 touchdown celebration involving props. Arceneaux used the end-zone corner post and the football to mimic putting in golf. Arceneaux gained an increasingly prominent role in the Lions offense over the next three seasons, culminating in being named a CFL All-Star in 2015 after setting (then) career highs in receptions, yards and touchdowns. Following the 2015 CFL season Arceneaux was re-signed by the Lions through the 2017 CFL season.

Arceneaux continued his stellar play in 2016 and 2017, catching at least 100 receptions in both seasons. On December 12, 2017, the Lions announced they had re-signed Arceneaux to a one-year deal through the 2018 season. Arceneaux suffered a torn ACL halfway through the season, at the time of the injury he was the Lions leading receiver in catches and yards.

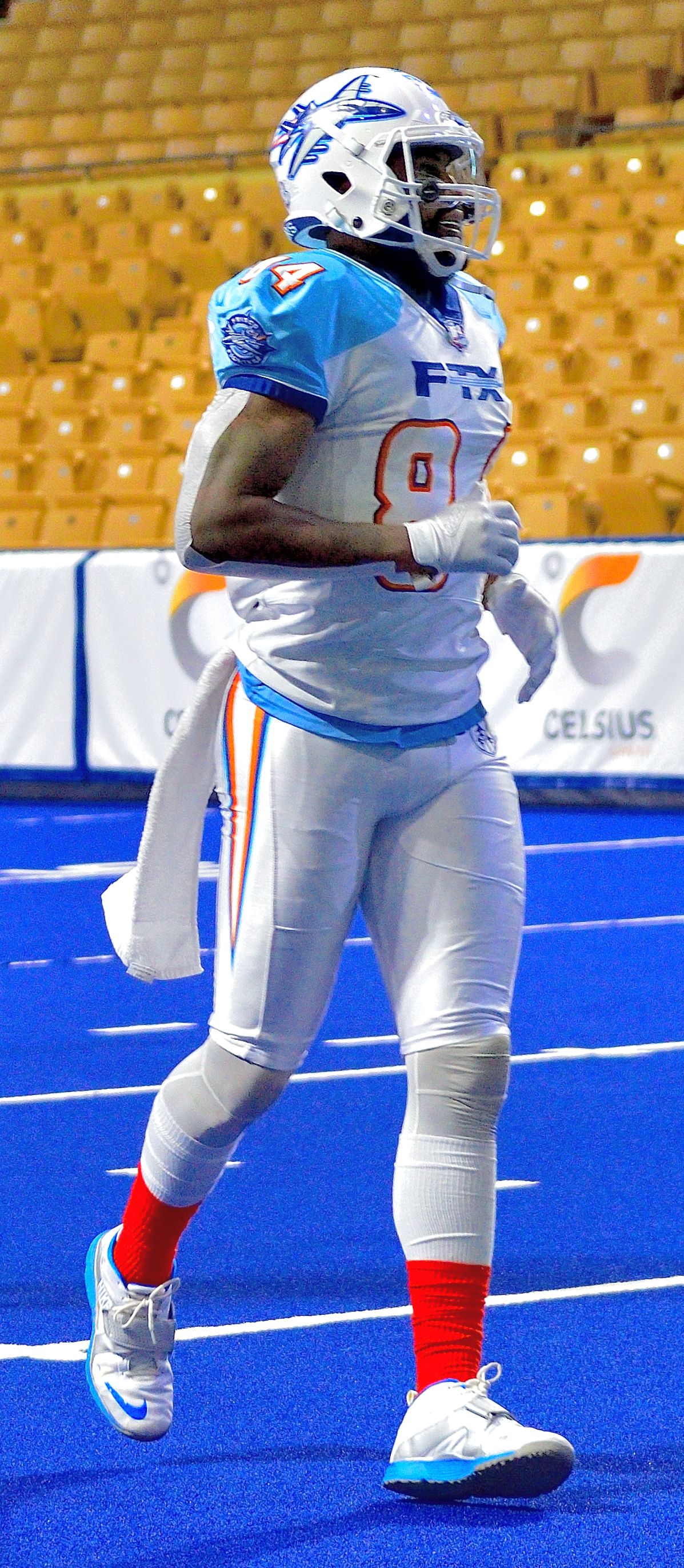
Arceneaux with the Frisco Fighters in 2021

=== Saskatchewan Roughriders ===
Arceneaux was signed to a one-year contract by the Saskatchewan Roughriders on February 15, 2019. He played in 11 games and recorded 22 receptions for 249 yards and two touchdowns. He also played in the Roughriders' West Final loss where he had one catch for five yards. He became a free agent on February 11, 2020.

=== Frisco Fighters ===
Arceneaux hoped to play one final season in 2020 before retiring, but the COVID-19 pandemic caused the 2020 CFL season to be cancelled.

In April 2021, Arceneaux signed with the Frisco Fighters of the Indoor Football League, after being persuaded by Frisco quarterback Jonathan Bane to join the team. The 33-year old receiver reflected on his "rookie season" in indoor football as potentially his last, which he considers the opposite of many indoor football players' careers, as the sport is more often used by younger players seeking a stepping stone to NFL or CFL play. Arceneaux caught 36 passes for 320 yards and 6 touchdowns, along with scoring 3 rushing touchdowns over 11 regular season games. In the 2 playoff games Frisco played prior to elimination, Arceneaux added 67 more yards on 4 catches, plus two more rushing touchdowns.

=== Edmonton Elks ===
On January 26, 2022, it was announced that Arceneaux had signed with the Edmonton Elks. On June 24, 2023, the Elks announced they had placed him on the six-game injured list with a knee injury. He played in 12 regular season games where he had 28 receptions for 346 yards. In the following offseason, he became a free agent upon the expiry of his contract on February 13, 2024. Arceneaux announced his retirement from professional football on May 7, 2024.

== Career statistics ==
Receiving		Regular season						Playoffs
Year	Team	GP	Rec	Yards	Avg	Long	TD	GP	Rec	Yards	Avg	Long	TD
2009	BC	18	63	858	13.6	60	7	2	12	189	15.8	49	0
2010	BC	18	67	1,114	16.6	74	5	1	5	80	16.0	29	1
2011	MIN	3	1	10	10.0	10	0	Team did not qualify
2013	BC	16	51	885	17.4	80	6	1	5	53	10.6	23	0
2014	BC	15	62	905	14.6	53	8	1	0	0	0	0	0
2015	BC	17	76	1,151	15.1	82	9	1	2	28	14	23	0
2016	BC	18	105	1,566	14.9	70	13	2	10	124	12.4	26	1
2017	BC	18	100	1,137	11.4	55	6	Team did not qualify
2018	BC	9	32	553	17.3	78	1	Injured
2019	SSK	11	22	249	11.3	55	2	1	1	5	5.0	5	0
2021	FF	11	36	320	8.9	30	6	2	4	67	16.75	24	0
2022	EDM	12	39	513	13.2	66	1	Team did not qualify
2023	EDM	12	28	346	12.4	77	0	Team did not qualify
IFL totals		11	36	320	8.9	30	6	2	4	67	16.75	24	0
CFL totals		164	645	9,277	14.4	82	58	9	35	479	13.7	49	2
NFL totals		3	1	10	10.0	10	0	0	0	0	0.0	0	0
