= Spencer Armstrong =

Canadian football player (born 1986)

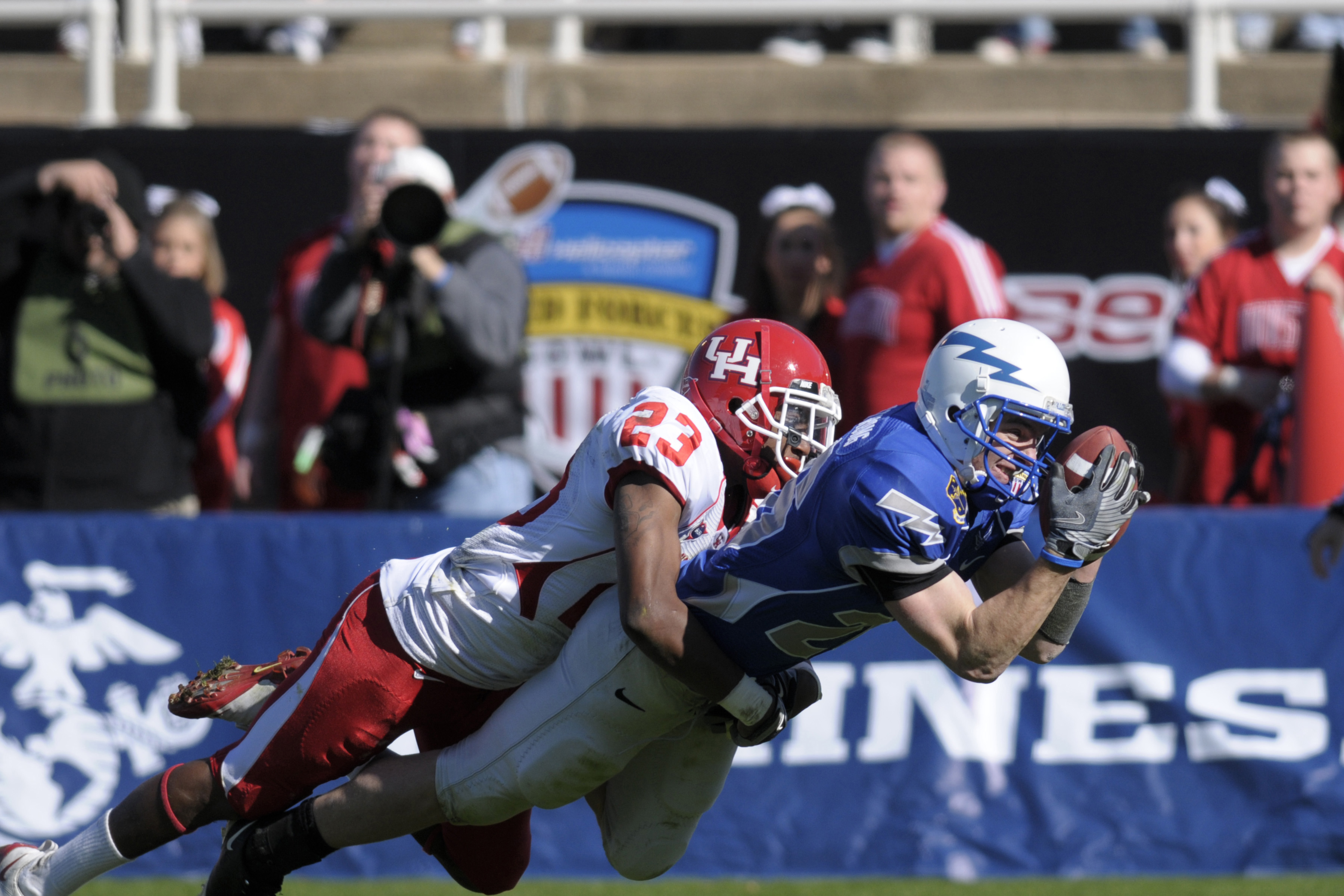
- Armstrong catches a pass in a 2008 game.

Profile
- Position: Wide receiver

Personal information
- Born: June 2, 1986 (age 40); Toronto, Ontario, Canada
- Listed height: 6 ft 1 in (1.85 m)
- Listed weight: 195 lb (88 kg)

Career information
- College: Air Force
- CFL draft: 2009: 4th round, 28th overall pick

Career history
- 2013: Calgary Stampeders
- 2014: Hamilton Tiger-Cats
- Stats at CFL.ca (archive)

Spencer Armstrong (born June 2, 1986) is a Canadian former professional football wide receiver. He was drafted by the Calgary Stampeders in the fourth round of the 2009 CFL draft and signed with the team on August 5, 2013. He was traded to the Tiger-Cats on January 6, 2014. Armstrong was released by the Tiger-Cats in May 2014. He played college football for the Air Force Falcons.
