= Scott McHenry =

Canadian football player (born 1987)

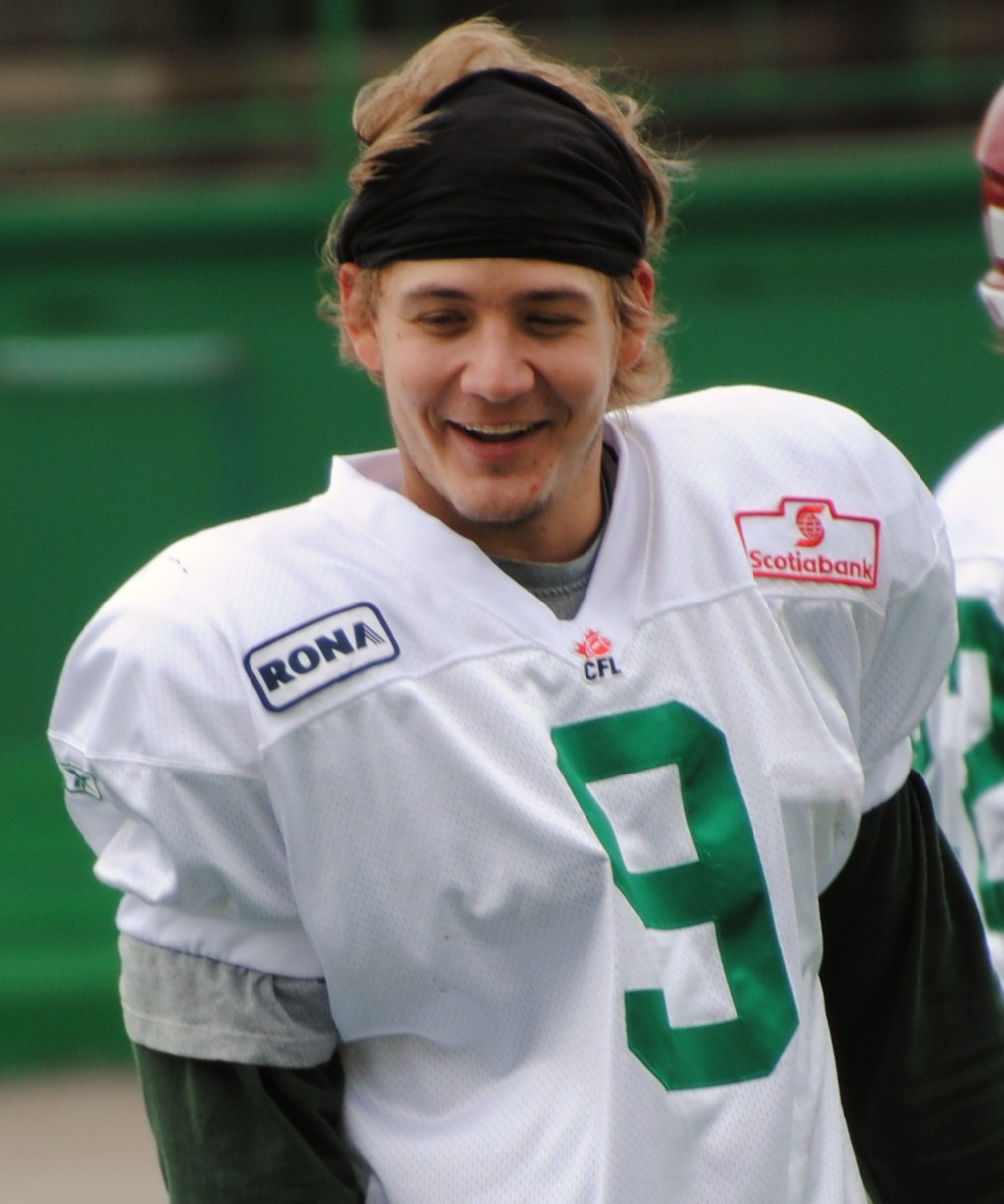
- McHenry with the Saskatchewan Roughriders in 2010

No. 18
- Position: Slotback

Personal information
- Born: May 25, 1987 (age 39); Saskatoon, Saskatchewan
- Listed height: 6 ft 2 in (1.88 m)
- Listed weight: 215 lb (98 kg)

Career information
- University: Saskatchewan
- CFL draft: 2009: 4th round, 32nd overall pick

Career history
- 2009: Calgary Stampeders*
- 2010: Winnipeg Blue Bombers*
- 2010: Saskatchewan Roughriders*
- 2010–2011: Winnipeg Blue Bombers
- 2011–2015: Saskatchewan Roughriders
- * Offseason or practice squad member only

Awards and highlights
- Grey Cup champion (2013)
- Stats at CFL.ca

Scott Patrick McHenry (born May 25, 1987) is a Canadian former professional football slotback who played in the Canadian Football League (CFL). He was drafted by the Calgary Stampeders in the fourth round of the 2009 CFL draft. He played CIS football for the Saskatchewan Huskies football team. He was signed in the 2010 offseason by the Winnipeg Blue Bombers, but was cut by the Bombers on June 23, 2010. Soon after, he signed a practice roster agreement with the Saskatchewan Roughriders on June 25, 2010. He was taken off the Roughriders' practice roster and signed to the Blue Bombers active roster on August 5, 2010 He was later released by the Blue Bombers on August 29, 2011. He was quickly signed to a practice roster agreement with the Roughriders on August 31, 2011.
