= Kieran Poissant =

Canadian gridiron football player (born 2001)

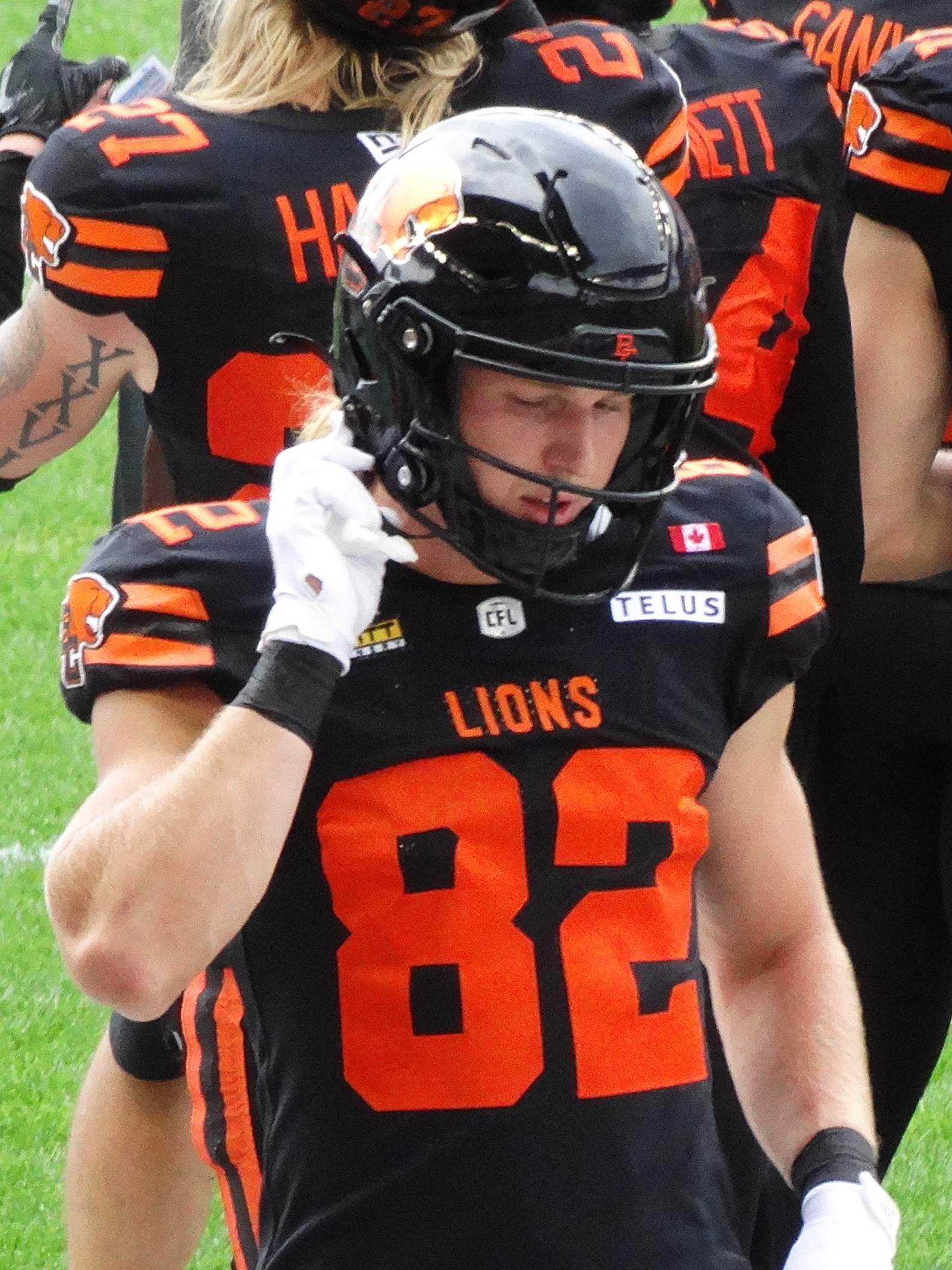
- Poissant with the BC Lions in 2025

No. 82 – BC Lions
- Position: Wide receiver
- Roster status: 1-game injured list
- CFL status: National

Personal information
- Born: March 1, 2001 (age 25)
- Listed height: 6 ft 0 in (1.83 m)
- Listed weight: 175 lb (79 kg)

Career information
- High school: Miller Catholic (Regina, Saskatchewan)
- CJFL: Westshore Rebels (2021–2023)

Career history
- BC Lions (2024–present)

Career CFL statistics as of 2026
- Receptions: 34
- Receiving yards: 314
- Receiving average: 9.2
- Stats at CFL.ca

Kieran Poissant (born March 1, 2001) is a Canadian professional football wide receiver for the BC Lions of the Canadian Football League (CFL). Poissant played junior football for the Westshore Rebels.

== Junior career ==
Poissant played junior football for the Westshore Rebels from 2021 to 2023, recording 146 catches for 2,314 yards, and 25 touchdowns. In 2022, he hauled in 49 passes for 811 yards and 10 touchdowns, to be BCFC's top receiver.

== Professional career ==
On November 22, 2023, Poissant signed with the BC Lions of the CFL. He was added to the practice roster on June 2, 2024. Poissant played in 11 games, recording seven receptions for 58 yards. He was released on November 3, 2024, but was later re-signed on November 18.

Poissant started the 2025 season on the active roster but did not play in the first two games before he was placed on the one-game injured list due to a thigh injury on June 20, 2025. On July 4, he was activated from the injured list.

On June 26, 2026, Poissant was placed on the Lions' 1-game injured list.
