= James Yurichuk =

Canadian football player (born 1986)

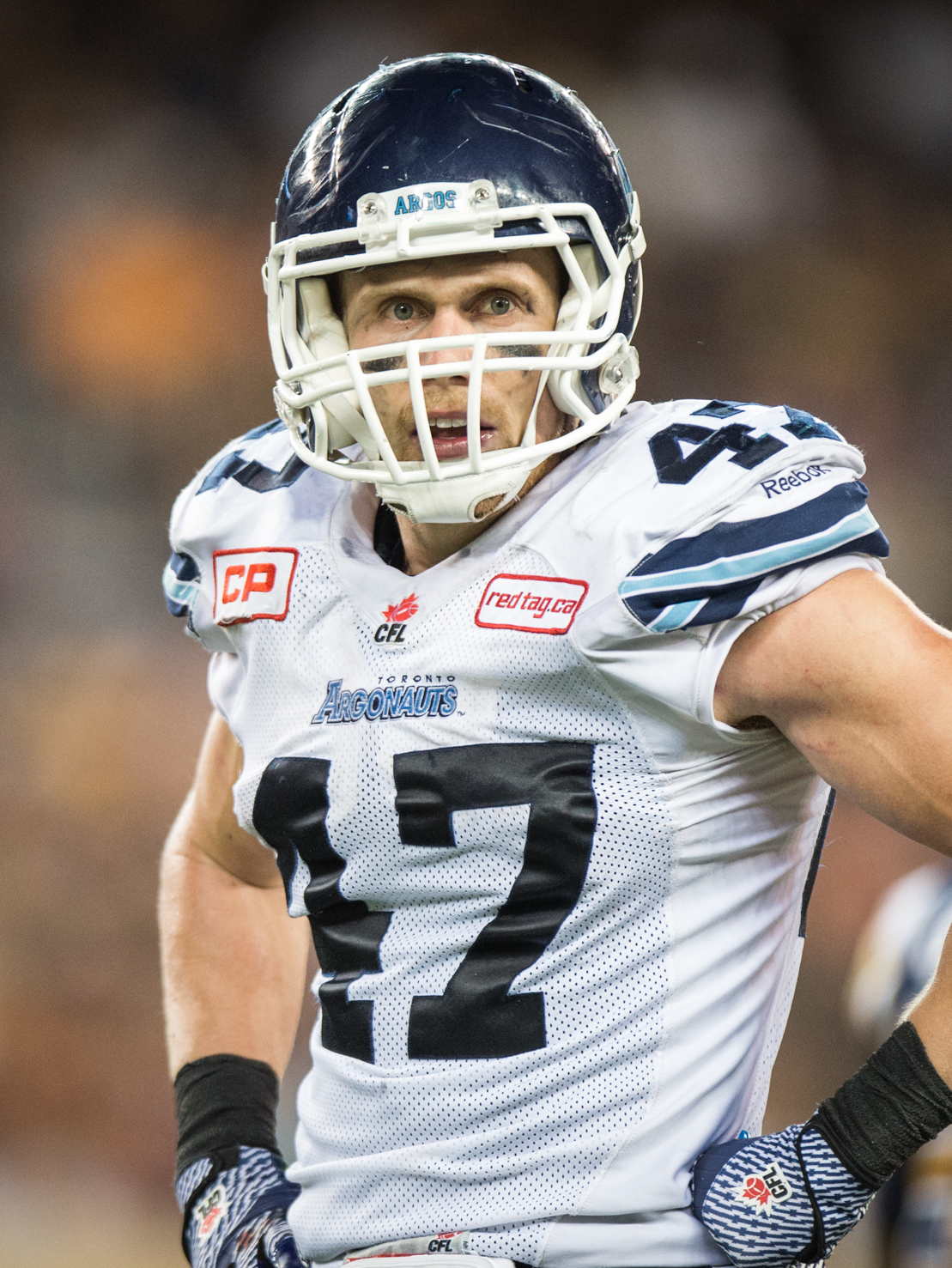
- Yurichuk with the Toronto Argonauts in 2015

No. 47
- Position: Linebacker

Personal information
- Born: November 1, 1986 (age 40); Brampton, Ontario, Canada
- Listed height: 6 ft 3 in (1.91 m)
- Listed weight: 233 lb (106 kg)

Career information
- University: Bishop's
- CFL draft: 2009: 1st round, 4th overall pick

Career history
- 2009–2012: BC Lions
- 2013–2016: Toronto Argonauts

Awards and highlights
- Grey Cup champion (2011); Jake Gaudaur Veterans' Trophy (2014)
- Stats at CFL.ca

James Yurichuk (born November 1, 1986) is a Canadian former professional football linebacker. He was drafted by the BC Lions in the 2009 CFL draft in the first round and played four seasons with the BC Lions, winning the Grey Cup in 2011 with the Lions. He played CIS football for the Bishop's Gaiters. Yurichuk is also the founder of Wuxly Outerwear.

== Professional career ==
=== BC Lions ===
Yurichuk was drafted by the BC Lions in the first round of the 2009 CFL draft. He played primarily on special teams in the 2009 BC Lions season and was among the league leaders in special teams tackles. His dribbled ball kick that led to a Lions touchdown in week 6 was considered the turning point of the game and demonstrated his knowledge of Canadian football rules. Yurichuk played in his first Grey Cup game in 2011 where he recorded two special teams tackles in the 99th Grey Cup victory over the Winnipeg Blue Bombers. He played in 72 regular season games for the Lions, starting in seven, where he had 42 defensive tackles, 61 special teams tackles, and three interceptions.

=== Toronto Argonauts ===
On February 15, 2013, the first day of CFL free agency, Yurichuk signed with the Toronto Argonauts. He earned the Jake Gaudaur Veterans' Trophy in 2014. He played in four seasons for the Argonauts where he dressed in 72 games, starting in five, and recorded 38 defensive tackles, 61 special teams tackles, and one interception. He became a free agent upon the expiry of his contract on February 14, 2017.
