= Guillaume Allard-Caméus =

Canadian football player (born 1984)

No. 34, 43
- Position: Fullback

Personal information
- Born: November 2, 1984 (age 42); Laval, Quebec, Canada
- Listed height: 6 ft 0 in (1.83 m)
- Listed weight: 215 lb (98 kg)

Career information
- University: Laval
- CFL draft: 2009: 5th round, 33rd overall pick

Career history
- 2009: Hamilton Tiger-Cats
- 2009: Montreal Alouettes

Awards and highlights
- Grey Cup champion (2009); 2× Vanier Cup champion (2006, 2008)

Guillaume Allard-Caméus (born November 2, 1984) is a Canadian former professional football fullback who played for the Hamilton Tiger-Cats and the Montreal Alouettes of the Canadian Football League (CFL). He was selected in the fifth round of the 2009 CFL draft. During the 2009 season, he went on to play four games with the Tiger-Cats and three with the Alouettes. He played college football for the Laval Rouge et Or, winning the Vanier Cup in 2006 and 2008.

== College career ==
Allard-Caméus played football at Cégep du Vieux Montréal and then Laval University. In 2006, he played a large role in the Rouge et Or's national championship run in the post-season. He ran for a touchdown in the conference semifinal against the McGill Redmen and led his team with 97 rushing yards in the Dunsmore Cup. In the 42nd Vanier Cup, the Rouge et Or won 13–8 against the Saskatchewan Huskies after Allard-Caméus scored a touchdown on a goal-line attempt. As a senior in 2008, Allard-Caméus received 77 carries for 389 yards and five touchdowns in the regular season. He scored a touchdown in the Uteck Bowl against the Calgary Dinos to help the Rouge et Or advance to the 44th Vanier Cup. In the championship game, the Rouge et Or defeated the Western Ontario Mustangs 44–21 as Allard-Caméus became a two-time Vanier Cup champion.

== Professional career ==
Allard-Caméus was selected in the fifth round of the 2009 CFL draft by the Hamilton Tiger-Cats with the 33rd overall pick. He went on to play four games with the Tiger-Cats, making two special teams tackles. He was later released by the team. In late August, the Montreal Alouettes signed Allard-Caméus to the practice squad, primarily intending to use him on special teams. He played in three games for the Alouettes on special teams, spending most of his time on the practice roster through the end of the season. He was a member of the Alouettes when they won the 97th Grey Cup.
