= Will Heyward =

American gridiron football player (born 1984)

No. 23
- Position: Defensive back

Personal information
- Born: February 23, 1984 (age 42); Seguin, Texas, U.S.
- Listed height: 5 ft 9 in (1.75 m)
- Listed weight: 190 lb (86 kg)

Career information
- High school: Seguin (TX)
- College: Texas State
- NFL draft: 2005: undrafted

Career history
- Corpus Christi Sharks (2007); Calgary Stampeders (2008)*; BC Lions (2009)*; Hamilton Tiger-Cats (2010); Ottawa Redblacks (2014)*
- * Offseason or practice squad member only

Will Heyward (born February 23, 1984) is an American former professional football defensive back. He had his best season with the Hamilton Tiger-Cats of the Canadian Football League (CFL). He was signed as a free-agent on May 19, 2010. He played college football at Texas State University–San Marcos and Arena Football League 2 prior to joining the Hamilton Tiger-Cats in May 2010.

== Career ==
=== High school ===
Heyward was an All-District wide receiver his Sophomore, Junior and Senior year in high school. After his Junior and Senior year, he was placed on the All-Region team selection as wide receiver. After his Senior year, he earned a spot on the All-State team as a defensive back and specialist. He completed his high school career with 238 tackles, 12 interceptions, 1,080 receiving yards, 14 touchdowns, 5 kickoff return touchdowns and 4 punt return touchdowns Heyward also ran track in high school. He was an All-Region selection his junior and senior year and finished 1st place in District for the 100-meter dash with a time of 10:47 his senior year.

=== College ===
Heyward played football at Texas State University from 2001–2004 and earned All-Conference selections throughout his college career. His senior year, he finished top ten in the nation for kick off return yards, averaging 26.9 yards per return. Heyward was also an All-Conference selection in track and field from 2001-2005.

=== Arena Football League 2 ===
In 2007, Heyward signed as a receiver and defensive back with the Corpus Christi Sharks of the Arena League Football 2. In his first year in the league, he recorded 77 tackles, 7 interceptions, 4 forced fumbles and ran two of the forced fumbled back for touchdowns. He completed the season as being Corpus Christi Sharks defensive player of the year.

=== Canadian Football League ===
On May 19, 2010, Heyward (who stands at 5'9 and weighs 190 lbs.) was signed as an import free-agent for the Hamilton Tiger-Cats. As injuries have played part in the season, Heyward has had the opportunity to gain starting position status.

Heyward signed with the Ottawa Redblacks before the 2014 season but was released in training camp, June 4, 2014.
