= Jonathan Pierre-Etienne =

Canadian football player (born 1984)

Profile
- Positions: Linebacker, Defensive end

Personal information
- Born: July 7, 1984 (age 42); Montreal, Quebec, Canada
- Listed height: 6 ft 2 in (1.88 m)
- Listed weight: 257 lb (117 kg)

Career information
- College: Rutgers
- University: Montreal
- CFL draft: 2009: 5th round, 37th overall pick

Career history
- 2009: BC Lions*
- 2011: Toronto Argonauts
- * Offseason or practice squad member only
- Stats at CFL.ca (archive)

Jonathan Pierre-Etienne (born July 7, 1984) is a Canadian lawyer and former professional Canadian football linebacker and defensive lineman for the Toronto Argonauts of the Canadian Football League. He was originally drafted by the BC Lions in the fifth round of the 2009 CFL draft. After completing his college eligibility, he signed with the Argonauts on December 16, 2011. He played college football for the Rutgers Scarlet Knights from 2005-2008 and then transferred to the Université de Montréal and played CIS football for the Montreal Carabins from 2008-2011. He was released by the Argonauts on June 17, 2012.
