= Darren Toney =

American gridiron football player (born 1984)

Profile
- Position: Defensive back

Personal information
- Born: January 9, 1984 (age 42); Lake Village, Arkansas, U.S.
- Listed height: 5 ft 11 in (1.80 m)
- Listed weight: 185 lb (84 kg)

Career information
- High school: Lake Village
- College: Arkansas State
- NFL draft: 2009: undrafted

Career history
- 2009: Peoria Pirates
- 2009: BC Lions
- 2011: Hamilton Tiger-Cats
- Stats at CFL.ca

Darren Toney (born January 9, 1984) is a former professional gridiron football defensive back in the Canadian Football League. He was originally signed by the BC Lions as a street free agent in 2009, but was cut in training camp in June 2010. He played college football for the Arkansas State Red Wolves.
