= Marquay McDaniel =

American gridiron football player and coach (born 1984)

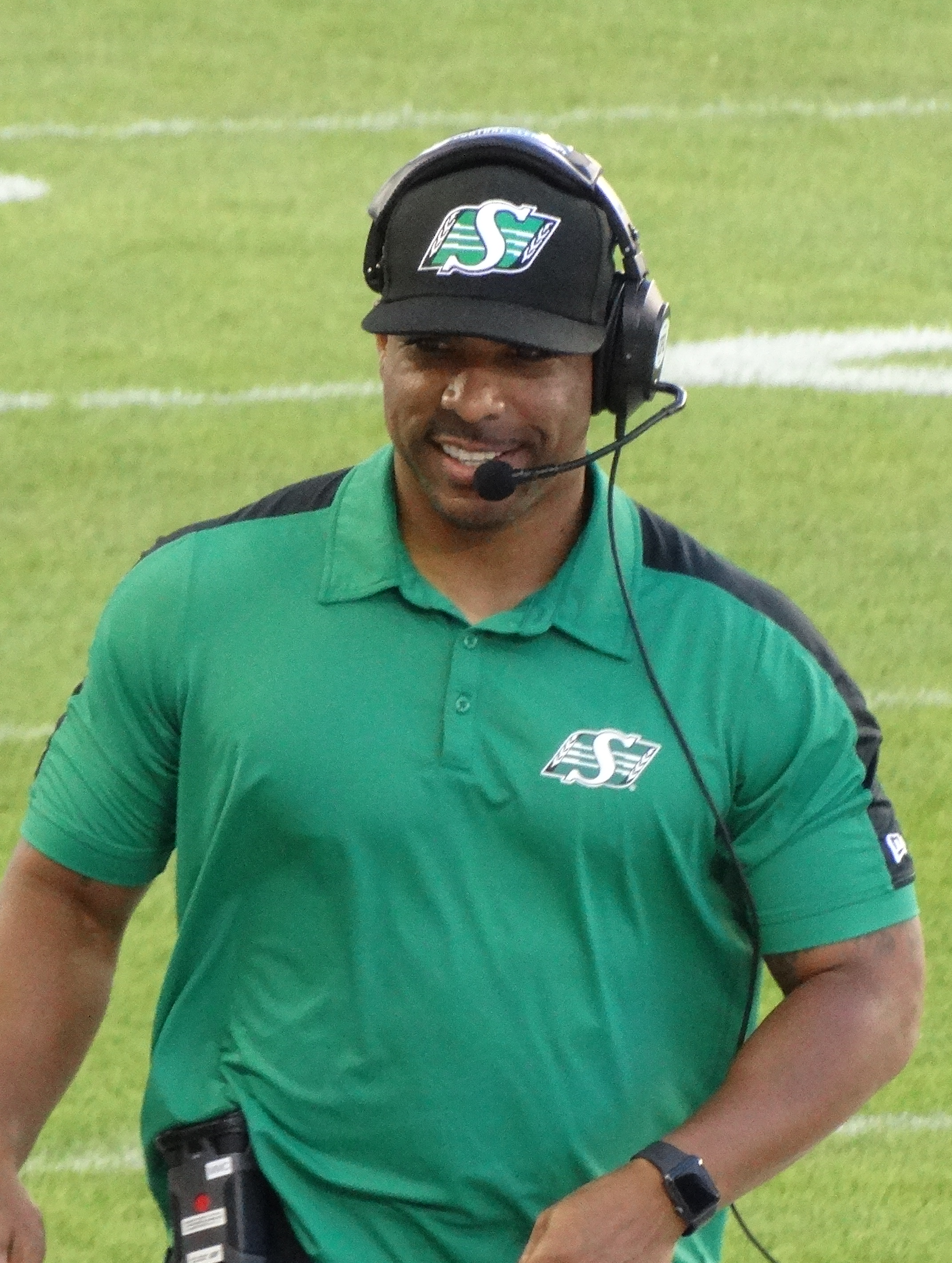
- McDaniel with the Saskatchewan Roughriders in 2024

Saskatchewan Roughriders
- Title: Receivers coach

Personal information
- Born: April 20, 1984 (age 42); Virginia Beach, Virginia, U.S.
- Listed height: 5 ft 10 in (1.78 m)
- Listed weight: 200 lb (91 kg)

Career information
- Position: Wide receiver (No. 16)
- College: Hampton

Career history

Playing
- 2007–2008: Denver Broncos*
- 2009–2011: Hamilton Tiger-Cats
- 2011–2017: Calgary Stampeders
- 2018: Hamilton Tiger-Cats
- * Offseason or practice squad member only

Coaching
- 2018: McMaster Marauders (Receivers coach)
- 2019: Montreal Alouettes (Offensive assistant)
- 2020–2022: Calgary Stampeders (Receivers coach)
- 2024–present: Saskatchewan Roughriders (Receivers coach)

Awards and highlights
- 2× Grey Cup champion (2014, 2025); CFL All-Star (2013); CFL West All-Star (2013); 3× All-MEAC (2004–2006)
- Stats at CFL.ca

Marquay McDaniel (born April 20, 1984) is the receivers coach for the Saskatchewan Roughriders of the Canadian Football League (CFL). He is a former professional Canadian football wide receiver who played for 10 seasons in the CFL, six with the Calgary Stampeders and four with the Hamilton Tiger-Cats. He was originally signed by the Denver Broncos as an undrafted free agent in 2007. McDaniel was named a CFL All-Star in 2013, and won a Grey Cup championship in 2014. He played college football for the Hampton Pirates.

== Professional career ==
Pre-draft measurables
Height	Weight	Arm length	Hand span	40-yard dash	10-yard split	20-yard split	20-yard shuttle	Three-cone drill	Vertical jump	Broad jump	Bench press
5 ft 10 1/2 in (1.79 m)	205 lb (93 kg)	31 3/4 in (0.81 m)	9 in (0.23 m)	4.57 s	1.56 s	2.64 s	4.35 s	7.13 s	33.5 in (0.85 m)	9 ft 6 in (2.90 m)	19 reps
All values from NFL Combine

=== Hamilton Tiger-Cats ===
In his rookie season McDaniel played in all 18 games and led the CFL with 2,535 all-purpose yards. He had 688 yards and three touchdowns on 57 receptions, 1,153 yards on 57 kickoff returns, 615 yards on 73 punt returns and 79 yards on five missed-field goal returns. He was Hamilton’s nominee for the CFL's Most Outstanding Rookie Award. He had six catches for 100 yards in the Ticats’ East semifinal loss to BC.

In 2010 McDaniel started all 18 regular-season games for the Tiger-Cats and finished second on the club in receiving yards with 998. He made 76 catches with seven of the grabs going for touchdowns. He also returned 15 kickoffs for 332 yards and six punts for 46 yards. McDaniel had six catches for 85 yards in the East semifinal.

2011 was a down year for McDaniel as he only saw action in one game, making four catches for 60 yards in a July 16 contest against the Saskatchewan Roughriders. Shortly after being released by Hamilton on Aug. 31, he signed with the Stampeders and spent the remainder of the season on Calgary’s practice roster.

=== Calgary Stampeders ===
2012 was a return to form for McDaniel, he started 14 games and all three post-season contests. In the regular season, he caught 53 passes for 744 yards and three touchdowns. He also carried the ball twice for 15 yards. His first touchdowns as a Stampeder came on Sept. 23 in Saskatchewan when he recorded two scores. McDaniel also saw time on special teams, returning 12 punts for 130 yards, one kickoff for 18 yards and one missed field goal for 31 yards. In the playoffs, McDaniel tallied 12 catches for 220 yards and a touchdown. His major came on the second play of the West final as he made a 68-yard catch and run for his longest career touchdown.

In 2013 McDaniel started all 18 games and was the team’s leading receiver and fourth in the league with 76 catches for 1,047 yards and eight touchdowns and five carries for 42 yards and touchdown. He surpassed the 1,000-yard receiving mark for the first time in his career on Oct. 26 against the Riders. He has also returned four punts for 44 yards. He was hurt in the last regular season game and was on the injured list for the Western Final. McDaniel was named a West Division all-star and CFL all-star.

In 2014 McDaniel started 12 games and was the team’s leading receiver for the second season in a row with 54 catches for 792 yards and four touchdowns. He added one carry for three yards. He also returned seven punts for 52 yards and one kickoff for 22 yards. He was placed on the six-game injury list prior to Game 12 after breaking his arm on Sept. 13 and returned to the lineup for the final regular season game. He was named CFL offensive player of the week for his 12-catch, 165-yard comeback performance in the last game of the regular season. McDaniel started the Western Final and had two catches for 58 yards including a 46-yard touchdown. He also started the Grey Cup where he hauled in seven catches for 61 yards. The Stampeders won the championship beating his former team, the Hamilton Tiger-Cats, in a 20–16 contest.

In 2015 McDaniel started all 18 games and had 86 catches for 1,038 yards and four touchdowns, plus caught five two-point converts which is a CFL season-record. He also carried the ball three times. McDaniel also started both playoff games and had six catches for 27 yards and returned four punts for 40 yards. In 2016 McDaniel started 16 games and was the team’s leading receiver with 1,074 yards and four touchdowns on 83 catches and added one carry for three yards. He also had a two-point convert. He played his 100th regular-season game on June 25. 2016 was his third 1,000-yard receiving season, and his third season to lead the Stampeders in receiving yards. He was on the one-game injury list for Games 17 and 18. In 2017 McDaniel re-signed with the Stampeders through the 2018 season. McDaniel had another strong season in 2017, leading the Stamps in receiving yards for the fourth consecutive season. Following the team's loss in the 105th Grey Cup McDaniel was critical of teammate Kamar Jorden's fumble which played a significant role in the Stamps' defeat. On February 9, 2018 the Stampeders announced they had released McDaniel.

=== Hamilton Tiger-Cats (II) ===
On September 9, 2018, McDaniel was re-signed by the Hamilton Tiger-Cats. McDaniel was initially signed to the practice roster so that he could continue to serve as the receivers coach at the nearby McMaster University, but was promoted following a slew of injuries to the Ti-Cat receivers. In four games, McDaniel caught eight passes for 65 yards.

=== CFL statistics ===
Receiving		Regular season
Year	Team	Games	No.	Yards	Avg	Long	TD
2009	HAM	18	57	688	12.1	41	3
2010	HAM	18	76	998	13.1	37	7
2011	HAM	1	4	60	15.0	24	0
2012	CGY	14	53	744	14.0	50	3
2013	CGY	18	76	1,047	13.8	63	8
2014	CGY	12	54	792	14.7	43	4
2015	CGY	18	86	1,038	12.1	63	4
2016	CGY	16	83	1,074	12.9	53	4
2017	CGY	15	65	860	13.2	49	4
2018	HAM	4	8	65	8.1	12	0
CFL totals		134	562	7,366	13.1	63	37

Source: CFL.ca Player Bio

== Coaching career ==
=== McMaster Marauders ===
Prior to serving as the receivers coach at McMaster University, McDaniel was a guest coach for his old CFL team in Calgary during training camp. After joining Hamilton later in the season, McDaniel continued to coach for McMaster, while also fulfilling his playing duties.

=== Montreal Alouettes ===
On June 25, 2019, McDaniel was hired by the Montreal Alouettes as an offensive assistant.

=== Calgary Stampeders ===
McDaniel joined Stampeders for the 2020 season as their receivers coach. After serving for two seasons, McDaniel was not retained for the 2023 season.

=== Saskatchewan Roughriders ===
On January 15, 2024, it was announced that McDaniel had been named the receivers coach for the Saskatchewan Roughriders.
