= Willie Thornton (Canadian football) =

American gridiron football player (born 1986)

Profile
- Position: Wide receiver

Personal information
- Born: February 15, 1986 (age 40); Belle Glade, Florida, U.S.
- Listed height: 5 ft 10 in (1.78 m)
- Listed weight: 180 lb (82 kg)

Career information
- College: Texas A&M-Commerce
- NFL draft: 2009: undrafted

Career history
- 2009: Edmonton Eskimos*
- 2010: Hamilton Tiger-Cats
- * Offseason or practice squad member only
- Stats at CFL.ca

William Thornton (born February 15, 1986) is an American former professional football wide receiver. He played college football at Texas A&M-Commerce, and played for the Hamilton Tiger-Cats of the Canadian Football League (CFL) in 2010.

== College career ==
Thornton played college football at Texas A&M-Commerce. On September 20, 2008, he caught seven passes for 266 yards in a 38-14 win against Eastern New Mexico. Thornton also had four touchdown catches in the game, including one for 98 yards on the opening play. As a result, he was named Lone Star Conference North player of the week. As a senior, Thornton caught 48 passes for 923 yards and 10 touchdowns.

== Professional career ==
Thornton was a member of the Edmonton Eskimos during training camp in 2009.

Thornton signed with the Hamilton Tiger-Cats on May 26, 2010, but he was sustained torn thumb ligaments during a collision with another player in training camp. He was released on June 8, 2010. He was signed to the team's practice roster on September 8, 2010, and released on September 29. He was re-signed to the practice roster on October 11. He was promoted to the active roster on November 4, and played in the team's November 6 game against the BC Lions. He was released by the Tiger-Cats in April 2011.
