= Cassidy Doneff =

Canadian football player (born 1986)

No. 80
- Position: Wide receiver

Personal information
- Born: July 14, 1986 (age 40); Cochrane, Alberta, Canada
- Listed height: 6 ft 0 in (1.83 m)
- Listed weight: 183 lb (83 kg)

Career information
- College: Washburn University
- CFL draft: 2009: 6th round, 41st overall pick

Career history
- 2009: Hamilton Tiger-Cats*
- 2011–2012: Winnipeg Blue Bombers
- * Offseason or practice squad member only
- Stats at CFL.ca

Cassidy Doneff (born July 14, 1986) is a Canadian former professional football wide receiver who played for the Winnipeg Blue Bombers of the Canadian Football League (CFL). He was drafted by the Hamilton Tiger-Cats in the sixth round of the 2009 CFL draft. He played college football for the Washburn Ichabods. In 2008, Doneff won the Wally Buono Award for the most outstanding junior football player.
