= Tang Bacheyie =

Canadian football player (born 1985)

Profile
- Positions: Safety, Linebacker

Personal information
- Born: March 25, 1985 (age 41); Windsor, Ontario
- Listed height: 6 ft 1 in (1.85 m)
- Listed weight: 207 lb (94 kg)

Career information
- College: Kansas
- CFL draft: 2009: 4th round, 29th overall pick

Career history
- 2009: BC Lions*
- 2009–2010: Toronto Argonauts
- * Offseason or practice squad member only
- Stats at CFL.ca (archive)

Tang Bacheyie (born March 25, 1985) is a Canadian former professional football safety. He last played for the Toronto Argonauts of the Canadian Football League. He was drafted by the BC Lions in the fourth round of the 2009 CFL draft. He played college football for the Kansas Jayhawks.

On July 22, 2009, Bacheyie was acquired by the Toronto Argonauts from the Lions' practice roster. On July 31, 2009, Bacheyie was released by the Argonauts, but re-signed with them on January 12, 2010. He was again released on June 1, 2011.
