= Martell Mallett =

American gridiron football player (born 1986)

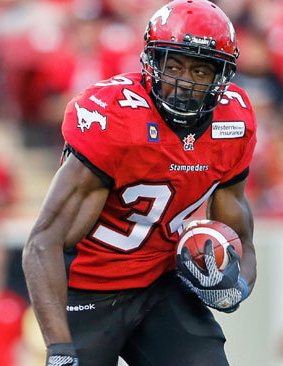
- Mallett with the Calgary Stampeders in 2014

No. 34
- Position: Running back

Personal information
- Born: May 13, 1986 (age 40); Pine Bluff, Arkansas, U.S.
- Listed height: 6 ft 0 in (1.83 m)
- Listed weight: 195 lb (88 kg)

Career information
- College: Arkansas–Pine Bluff
- NFL draft: 2009: undrafted

Career history
- BC Lions (2009); Philadelphia Eagles (2010)*; Cleveland Browns (2010)*; Philadelphia Eagles (2010)*; New York Giants (2010–2011)*; Hamilton Tiger-Cats (2012); Calgary Stampeders (2014)
- * Offseason or practice squad member only

Awards and highlights
- Grey Cup champion (2014); CFL West All-Star (2009); Jackie Parker Trophy (2009); CFL's Most Outstanding Rookie Award (2009)

Career CFL statistics
- Rushing yards: 1,403
- Rushing touchdowns: 6
- Receptions: 50
- Receiving yards: 414
- Receiving touchdowns: 2
- Stats at CFL.ca (archived)

Martell Mallett (born May 13, 1986) is an American former professional football running back. He was signed by the BC Lions of the Canadian Football League (CFL) as a street free agent in 2009. He played college football at Arkansas at Pine Bluff.

Mallett was also a member of the Cleveland Browns, Philadelphia Eagles, New York Giants, Hamilton Tiger-Cats, and Calgary Stampeders.

== Professional career ==
=== BC Lions ===
On September 4, 2009, in a home game against the Montreal Alouettes, Mallett rushed for a franchise record 213 yards. He rushed for 1240 yards during the 2009 season and was a Western All-Star.

On November 26, 2009, Mallett was named the CFL's Most Outstanding Rookie of the Year.

=== Philadelphia Eagles ===
Mallett was signed by the Philadelphia Eagles on January 19, 2010. He was waived on July 31, 2010. He was re-signed on August 1. He was waived again on September 3, but was re-signed to the team's practice squad on September 5. He was released from the practice squad on September 21.

=== Cleveland Browns ===
Mallett was signed to the Cleveland Browns' practice squad on September 28, 2010. He was released on November 23, 2010.

=== Philadelphia Eagles ===
Mallett was re-signed to the Philadelphia Eagles' practice squad on January 5, 2011. His practice squad contract expired after the conclusion of the season.

=== New York Giants ===
Mallett was signed to a future contract by the New York Giants on January 11, 2011. On August 1, he was waived/injured by the Giants and after clearing waivers, was placed on injured reserve. He was released from injured reserve with an injury settlement on August 25.

=== Hamilton Tiger-Cats ===
Mallett returned to the CFL by signing with the Hamilton Tiger-Cats on January 30, 2012. On June 6, 2012, Mallett tore his Achilles tendon during training camp. He did not play in the 2012 season. He was released by the Tiger-Cats on May 24, 2013.

=== Calgary Stampeders ===
Mallett signed with the Calgary Stampeders on February 9, 2014. He played his first professional game in over four years on August 1, 2014, rushing for over 100 yards in a game versus his former team, the B.C. Lions.
