= Rocky Schwartz =

American football player (born 1984)

Profile
- Position: Safety

Personal information
- Born: August 27, 1984 (age 42); Bradenton, Florida
- Listed height: 5 ft 10 in (1.78 m)
- Listed weight: 200 lb (91 kg)

Career information
- College: Houston
- NFL draft: 2008: undrafted

Career history
- New Orleans Saints (2008)*; Tennessee Titans (2008)*; Hamilton Tiger-Cats (2008)*
- * Offseason or practice squad member only
- Stats at CFL.ca (archive)

Roderick Evan Schwartz, II (born August 27, 1984) is an American former football safety. He was signed by the New Orleans Saints as an undrafted free agent in 2008. He played college football at Houston.

Schwartz was also a member of the Tennessee Titans and Hamilton Tiger-Cats. Schwartz now assists in coaching for the Pop Warner East Manatee Bulldogs in Bradenton Florida.
