= Jamall Lee =

Canadian gridiron football player (born 1987)

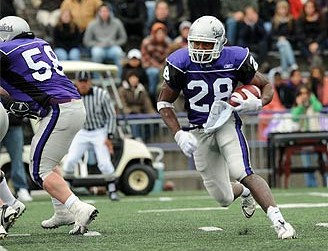
- Lee (28) playing for the Bishop's Gaiters

No. 23
- Position: Running back

Personal information
- Born: March 13, 1987 (age 39); New Westminster, British Columbia, Canada
- Listed height: 6 ft 1 in (1.85 m)
- Listed weight: 221 lb (100 kg)

Career information
- University: Bishop's
- CFL draft: 2009: 1st round, 3rd overall pick

Career history
- Carolina Panthers (2009)*; BC Lions (2009–2012)
- * Offseason or practice squad member only

Awards and highlights
- QUFL Most Outstanding Player (2007); CIS first team all-star (2008); QUFL's career rushing record (4,296 yards)
- Stats at CFL.ca (archive)

Jamall Lee (born March 13, 1987) is a Canadian former professional football running back who played three seasons for the BC Lions of the Canadian Football League (CFL). He was signed by the Carolina Panthers of the National Football League (NFL) as an undrafted free agent in 2009 and released at the end of the pre-season, making him an NFL free agent. He was selected by the BC Lions third overall in the 2009 CFL draft. He played CIS football for the Bishop's Gaiters.

== Early life ==
Lee was born in New Westminster, British Columbia. His father, Orville Lee, was the last Canadian to lead the CFL in rushing, in the 1988 CFL season. Jamall played Canadian football at Terry Fox Secondary School and though he was not recruited by any American college football or Canadian university teams, his father's connections with Bishop's University in Lennoxville, Quebec, gave him an opportunity to play for the Gaiters.

== University career ==
At Bishop's, Lee ran for a four-year total of 4,296 yards, which made him the Quebec University Football League's all-time leading rusher. He was also selected as the QUFL's most outstanding player of 2007 and a CIS first team all-star for the 2008 CIS football season. He was the only Canadian selected to play in the 2009 Texas vs. The Nation Game in El Paso, Texas. Ahead of the 2009 CFL Evaluation Camp, Lee was ranked second amongst those eligible for the 2009 CFL draft. He set new CFL Evaluation Camp records for both the 40-yard dash at 4.39 seconds and the vertical jump at 44 inches (110 cm).

== Professional career ==
=== Carolina Panthers ===
Lee signed with the Carolina Panthers as an undrafted free agent on April 27, 2009. Lee dressed for all four pre-season games for the Panthers including their final on September 3, 2009, in which he scored the team's sole touchdown.

He was released from the team before the start of the 2009 regular season.

=== BC Lions ===
On October 12, 2009, the BC Lions announced that they had agreed to terms with Lee and he dressed for the final four games of the season. On October 31, 2009, Lee recorded his first career reception against the Calgary Stampeders. Lee played in both playoff games and recorded one rush for -1 yards and one catch for -5 yards in the Eastern Final. After three seasons as a special teams player and backup running back, he announced his retirement on February 13, 2012.
