= Matt Morencie =

Canadian football player (born 1987)

No. 68
- Position: Offensive lineman

Personal information
- Born: December 28, 1987 (age 38); Windsor, Ontario, Canada
- Listed height: 6 ft 2 in (1.88 m)
- Listed weight: 267 lb (121 kg)

Career information
- University: Windsor
- CFL draft: 2009: 3rd round, 21st overall pick

Career history
- 2009: BC Lions*
- 2010: Hamilton Tiger-Cats*
- 2010–2011: Winnipeg Blue Bombers
- * Offseason or practice squad member only

Awards and highlights
- J. P. Metras Trophy (2009)
- Stats at CFL.ca

Matt Morencie (born December 28, 1987) is a Canadian former professional football offensive lineman. He was drafted by the BC Lions in the third round of the 2009 CFL draft. He played CIS football for the Windsor Lancers.
