= Raymond Wladichuk =

Canadian football player (born 1987)

Profile
- Position: Defensive back

Personal information
- Born: November 7, 1987 (age 38); Vernon, British Columbia
- Listed height: 6 ft 1 in (1.85 m)
- Listed weight: 200 lb (91 kg)

Career information
- College: Simon Fraser
- CFL draft: 2009: 5th round, 38th overall pick

Career history
- Hamilton Tiger-Cats (2010–2011)
- Stats at CFL.ca (archive)

Raymond Wladichuk (born November 7, 1987) is a Canadian former professional football defensive back. He most recently played for the Hamilton Tiger-Cats of the Canadian Football League. He was drafted by the Tiger-Cats in the 2009 CFL draft with the 38th pick in the fifth round, but returned to play with the Simon Fraser Clan after attending Hamilton's 2009 training camp.
