= Simeon Rottier =

Canadian football player (born 1984)

No. 65
- Position: Guard

Personal information
- Born: January 21, 1984 (age 42); Westlock, Alberta, Canada
- Listed height: 6 ft 6 in (1.98 m)
- Listed weight: 295 lb (134 kg)

Career information
- CJFL: Edmonton Huskies
- University: Alberta
- CFL draft: 2009: 1st round, 1st overall pick

Career history
- 2009–2011: Hamilton Tiger-Cats
- 2012–2017: Edmonton Eskimos

Awards and highlights
- Grey Cup champion (2015); CFL All-Star (2014); CFL West All-Star (2014)
- Stats at CFL.ca

Simeon Rottier (born January 21, 1984) is a Canadian former professional football offensive lineman who played in the Canadian Football League (CFL). He was selected by the Hamilton Tiger-Cats with the first overall pick in the 2009 CFL draft, becoming the first player from Alberta to be taken first overall. He played CIS football for the Alberta Golden Bears and he played junior football for the Edmonton Huskies.

Khalif Mitchell was suspended by the CFL on July 23, 2012, for two games without pay after he violently hyperextended the arm of Rottier. Rottier announced his retirement from professional football career on 17 May 2018 after nine seasons in the CFL, having spent the previous six seasons prior to his retirement playing for the Edmonton Eskimos.
