= Scott McCuaig =

Canadian football player (born 1984)

Profile
- Position: Defensive end

Personal information
- Born: June 5, 1984 (age 42); Surrey, British Columbia, Canada
- Listed height: 6 ft 4 in (1.93 m)
- Listed weight: 245 lb (111 kg)

Career information
- University: British Columbia
- CFL draft: 2009: 3rd round, 22nd overall pick

Career history
- 2009: Hamilton Tiger-Cats*
- 2009–2010: BC Lions
- * Offseason or practice squad member only
- Stats at CFL.ca

Scott McCuaig (born June 5, 1984) is a Canadian former professional football defensive lineman who played for the BC Lions. He was drafted by the Hamilton Tiger-Cats of the Canadian Football League in the third round of the 2009 CFL draft. He played CIS football for the UBC Thunderbirds, as a standout defensive lineman, sharing the single season record for QB sacks (11), named Canada West’s MOP, and in 2021 was named to UBC’s “All-Decade Team”

McCuaig was signed by the Hamilton Tiger-Cats on May 28, 2009, following the 2009 CFL Draft. He was placed on the practice roster on June 29, 2009, at the conclusion of the pre-season. On August 19, 2009, unhappy with being placed on the practice roster and seeing an opportunity to return to British Columbia, he requested a release from the Tiger-Cats and signed with the BC Lions on August 28, 2009. Following his football career he became a firefighter in BC’s Lower Mainland.
