= 2009 CFL draft =

Canadian football draft

General information
- Sport: Canadian football
- Date: May 2
- Time: 11:00 AM ET
- Location: Toronto
- Network: TSN

Overview
- 48 total selections in 6 rounds
- First selection: Simeon Rottier
- Most selections: Calgary Stampeders (8); Montreal Alouettes (8); Hamilton Tiger-Cats (8)
- Fewest selections: Saskatchewan Roughriders (2)
- CIS selections: 38
- NCAA selections: 10

The 2009 CFL draft took place on Saturday, May 2, 2009 at 11:00 AM ET on TSN. 48 players were chosen from among 774 eligible players from Canadian universities across the country, as well as Canadian players playing in the NCAA. Of the 48 draft selections, 38 players were drafted from Canadian Interuniversity Sport institutions, including the first seven.

The first two rounds were broadcast live on TSN with CFL Commissioner Mark Cohon announcing each selection. The production was hosted by Rod Black and featured the CFL on TSN panel which included Duane Forde, Steve Sumarah, Stefan Ptaszek, Farhan Lalji, Glen Suitor, Matt Dunigan, and Chris Schultz who analyzed the teams' needs and picks.

== Round one ==
| = CFL Division All-Star | = CFL All-Star | = Hall of Famer |

| Pick # | CFL team | Player | Position | School |
|---|---|---|---|---|
| 1 | Hamilton Tiger-Cats | Simeon Rottier | OT | Alberta |
| 2 | Toronto Argonauts | Étienne Légaré | DT | Laval |
| 3 | BC Lions (via Hamilton via Winnipeg) | Jamall Lee | RB | Bishop's |
| 4 | BC Lions (via Toronto via Edmonton) | James Yurichuk | LB | Bishop's |
| 5 | BC Lions | Matt Carter | WR | Acadia |
| 6 | Hamilton Tiger-Cats (via BC via Saskatchewan) | Darcy Brown | WR | St. Mary's |
| 7 | Montreal Alouettes | Dylan Steenbergen | OL | Calgary |
| 8 | Calgary Stampeders | Eric Fraser | S | Central Michigan |

== Round two ==
| Pick # | CFL team | Player | Position | School |
|---|---|---|---|---|
| 9 | Saskatchewan Roughriders (via Hamilton) | Tamon George | DB | Regina |
| 10 | Toronto Argonauts | Matt Lambros | WR | Liberty |
| 11 | Edmonton Eskimos (via Winnipeg) | Gordon Hinse | OT | Alberta |
| 12 | Edmonton Eskimos | Dee Stirling | DL | Queen's |
| 13 | Hamilton Tiger-Cats (via BC) | Ryan Hinds | DB | New Hampshire |
| 14 | Montreal Alouettes (via Saskatchewan) | Martin Bédard | TE | UConn |
| 15 | Montreal Alouettes | Matt Singer | OL | Manitoba |
| 16 | Calgary Stampeders | Tristan Black | LB | Wayne State |

== Round three ==
| Pick # | CFL team | Player | Position | School |
|---|---|---|---|---|
| 17 | Saskatchewan Roughriders (via Hamilton) | Nick Hutchins | OL | Regina |
| 18 | Toronto Argonauts | James Green | LB | Calgary |
| 19 | Winnipeg Blue Bombers | Mike Morris | OL | UBC |
| 20 | Edmonton Eskimos | Andrea Bonaventura | LB | Calgary |
| 21 | BC Lions | Matt Morencie | OL | Windsor |
| 22 | Hamilton Tiger-Cats (via Saskatchewan) | Scott McCuaig | LB | UBC |
| 23 | Montreal Alouettes | Nickolas Morin-Soucy | DL | Montreal |
| 24 | Calgary Stampeders | John Hashem | OT | Regina |

== Round four ==
| Pick # | CFL team | Player | Position | School |
|---|---|---|---|---|
| 25 | Montreal Alouettes (via Hamilton) | Stan Van Sichem | DL | Regina |
| 26 | Toronto Argonauts | Zachary Pollari | OT | Western Ontario |
| 27 | Winnipeg Blue Bombers | Adam Bestard | OL | Wilfrid Laurier |
| 28 | Calgary Stampeders (via Edmonton) | Spencer Armstrong | WR | Air Force |
| 29 | BC Lions | Tang Bacheyie | S | Kansas |
| 30 | Calgary Stampeders (via Saskatchewan) | Steve Myddelton | DE | St. Francis Xavier |
| 31 | Montreal Alouettes | Ivan Brown | DL | Saskatchewan |
| 32 | Calgary Stampeders | Scott McHenry | SB | Saskatchewan |

== Round five ==
| Pick # | CFL team | Player | Position | School |
|---|---|---|---|---|
| 33 | Hamilton Tiger-Cats | Guillarme Allard-Cameus | RB | Laval |
| 34 | Toronto Argonauts | Gordon Sawler | DL | St. Francis Xavier |
| 35 | Winnipeg Blue Bombers | Peter Quinney | FB | Wilfrid Laurier |
| 36 | Edmonton Eskimos | Eric Lee | RB | Weber State |
| 37 | BC Lions | Jonathan Pierre-Etienne | DE | Montreal |
| 38 | Hamilton Tiger-Cats (via Saskatchewan) | Raymond Wladichuk | DB | Simon Fraser |
| 39 | Montreal Alouettes | Benoît Boulanger | RB | Sherbrooke |
| 40 | Calgary Stampeders | Osie Ukwuoma | DL | Queen's |

== Round six ==
| Pick # | CFL team | Player | Position | School |
|---|---|---|---|---|
| 41 | Hamilton Tiger-Cats | Cassidy Doneff | WR | Washburn |
| 42 | Toronto Argonauts | Anthony DesLauriers | DB | Simon Fraser |
| 43 | Toronto Argonauts (via Winnipeg) | Brad Crawford | DB | Guelph |
| 44 | Edmonton Eskimos | Jason Kosec | LB | Western Ontario |
| 45 | Winnipeg Blue Bombers (via BC) | Thaine Carter | LB | Queen's |
| 46 | Hamilton Tiger-Cats (via Saskatchewan) | Bill McGrath | OL | Indiana State |
| 47 | Montreal Alouettes | Ryan Mousseau | OL | Ottawa |
| 48 | Calgary Stampeders | John Kanaroski | WR | Regina |
