= Darcy Brown =

Canadian football player (born 1986)

Profile
- Position: Fullback

Personal information
- Born: May 29, 1986 (age 40); Mississauga, Ontario, Canada
- Listed height: 6 ft 4 in (1.93 m)
- Listed weight: 250 lb (113 kg)

Career information
- High school: The Woodlands
- College: Saint Mary's
- CFL draft: 2009: 1st round, 6th overall pick

Career history
- 2009–2012: Hamilton Tiger-Cats
- 2012: Edmonton Eskimos
- Stats at CFL.ca (archive)

Darcy Brown (born May 29, 1986) is a Canadian former professional football fullback and tight end formerly of the Edmonton Eskimos of the Canadian Football League (CFL). He was drafted by the Hamilton Tiger-Cats in the first round of the 2009 CFL draft. He played CIS football for the Saint Mary's Huskies.

== Early life ==
Brown went to The Woodlands School, where he played varsity football for four years.
