= Ryan Hinds (Canadian football) =

Canadian football player (born 1986)

Profile
- Position: Defensive back

Personal information
- Born: August 21, 1986 (age 40); Georgetown, Guyana
- Listed height: 6 ft 1 in (1.85 m)
- Listed weight: 200 lb (91 kg)

Career information
- High school: North Toronto
- College: New Hampshire
- CFL draft: 2009: 2nd round, 13th overall pick

Career history
- 2010–2013: Hamilton Tiger-Cats
- 2013–2015: Edmonton Eskimos
- 2016: Ottawa Redblacks*
- * Offseason or practice squad member only

Awards and highlights
- Grey Cup champion (2015)
- Stats at CFL.ca

Ryan Hinds (born June 19, 1986) is a former professional Canadian football defensive back. He was raised in Toronto, Canada and played college football for the New Hampshire Wildcats. A Biology major, In the 31 games he played, Hinds made 60 tackles (40 solo), 5 interceptions (218 yards total return), and 20 pass break ups. Hinds sits on the Board of Directors for GTA Youth Athletics, a not-for-profit organization he began to teach children leadership through the sport of football.

== Professional career ==
=== Hamilton Tiger-Cats ===
He was drafted by the Hamilton Tiger-Cats in the 2009 CFL draft with the 13th pick in the second round. After being with the team for four seasons, he was released by the Tiger-Cats on August 14, 2013.

=== Edmonton Eskimos ===
Hinds signed with the Edmonton Eskimos about two weeks after being released by the Ti-Cats. Hinds played in 22 games for the Eskimos in three seasons. He was not re-signed by the club following the 2015 CFL season, and became a free-agent on February 9, 2016.

=== Ottawa RedBlacks ===
On February 19, 2016, Hinds agreed to a contract with the Ottawa RedBlacks. However, Hinds elected not to attend training camp, announcing via his agent that, "his heart wasn’t in it and he wasn’t going to play anymore".
