= Jordan Matechuk =

No. 51
- Position: Long snapper

Personal information
- Born: September 22, 1985 (age 41); Yorkton, Saskatchewan, Canada
- Listed height: 5 ft 10 in (1.78 m)
- Listed weight: 234 lb (106 kg)

Career information
- NFL draft: 2007: undrafted

Career history
- Regina Thunder (2005); Winnipeg Rifles (2006); Victoria Rebels (2007); Winnipeg Blue Bombers (2007)*; Hamilton Tiger-Cats (2008–2010); Winnipeg Blue Bombers (2012); Saskatchewan Roughriders (2013)*; BC Lions (2013–2014)
- * Offseason or practice squad member only
- Stats at CFL.ca (archive)

Jordan Matechuk (born September 22, 1985) is a Canadian former professional football linebacker and long snapper who played in the Canadian Football League. He played junior football for the Regina Thunder, Winnipeg Rifles and Victoria Rebels. He was signed by the Blue Bombers as an undrafted free agent in 2007. Matechuk was signed by the Hamilton Tiger-Cats in 2008 and was released before the 2011 season after spending three seasons with the club. On February 14, 2012, Matechuk once again signed with the Winnipeg Blue Bombers.
