= Matt Carter (Canadian football) =

Canadian football player (born 1986)

No. 85
- Position: Slotback

Personal information
- Born: August 2, 1986 (age 40); Kelowna, British Columbia
- Listed height: 6 ft 2 in (1.88 m)
- Listed weight: 200 lb (91 kg)

Career information
- High school: Mount Boucherie
- University: Acadia
- CFL draft: 2009: 1st round, 5th overall pick

Career history
- 2009: BC Lions*
- 2009–2011: Hamilton Tiger-Cats
- 2012–2013: Edmonton Eskimos
- 2014–2015: Ottawa Redblacks
- * Offseason or practice squad member only
- Stats at CFL.ca (archive)

Matt Carter (born August 2, 1986, in Kelowna, British Columbia) is a retired professional Canadian football wide receiver. He was drafted fifth overall by the BC Lions in the 2009 CFL draft. He played CIS football for the Acadia Axemen. He was also a member of the Hamilton Tiger-Cats, Edmonton Eskimos and Ottawa Redblacks.

== Professional career ==
Carter was drafted by the BC Lions in the first round of the 2009 CFL draft and signed briefly to their practice roster before he asked to be released, so he could return closer to his family in Oakville, Ontario, as they dealt with a family medical issue. Several weeks later, the nearby Hamilton Tiger-Cats signed him to their practice roster. He spent three seasons with the Tiger-Cats until he became a free agent on February 15, 2012. He then signed with the Edmonton Eskimos on February 22, 2012. After spending two seasons with the Eskimos, he signed as a free agent with the Ottawa Redblacks on February 11, 2014. After two seasons in Ottawa, Carter retired from professional football in January 2016, citing concussions as the main reason for his decision.
