= 2010 Toronto Argonauts season =

CFL team season

- General manager: Adam Rita
- Head coach: Jim Barker
- Home stadium: Rogers Centre

Results
- Record: 9–9
- Division place: 3rd, East
- Playoffs: Lost East Final

Uniform

The 2010 Toronto Argonauts season was the 53rd season for the team in the Canadian Football League (CFL) and their 138th overall. The Argonauts improved upon their 3–15 record from 2009 and their 4–14 record from 2008 and qualified for the playoffs for the first time since 2007. After upsetting the Hamilton Tiger-Cats in the East Semi-Final, they were defeated in the East Final by the hosting Montreal Alouettes.

== Offseason ==
=== CFL draft ===
Round	Pick	Player	Position	School/Club team
1	2	Joe Eppele	OT	Washington State
1	3	Cory Greenwood	LB	Concordia
2	11	Grant Shaw	DB/K	Saskatchewan
3	18	Spencer Watt	WR	Simon Fraser
4	26	Joel Reinders	OT	Waterloo
4	30	Steven Turner	WR	Bishop's
5	32	Michael Warner	OL	Waterloo
6	40	Nasser Jamal	OL	Louisiana-Lafayette
6	44	Conor Elliott	LB	Western

== Preseason ==
Week	Date	Opponent	Location	Final score	Attendance	Record
A	June 13	Tiger-Cats	Rogers Centre	W 13 – 10	12,514	1–0
B	June 19	@ Alouettes	Molson Stadium	L 31 – 23	23,112	1–1

== Regular season ==
=== Season standings ===
East Division
Team	GP	W	L	T	PF	PA	Pts	
Montreal Alouettes	18	12	6	0	521	475	24	Details
Hamilton Tiger-Cats	18	9	9	0	481	450	18	Details
Toronto Argonauts	18	9	9	0	373	442	18	Details
Winnipeg Blue Bombers	18	4	14	0	464	485	8	Details

=== Season schedule ===
Win Loss Tie

Week	Date	Opponent	Location	Final score	Attendance	Record
1	July 1	@ Stampeders	McMahon Stadium	L 30 – 16	29,333	0–1
2	July 9	@ Blue Bombers	Canad Inns Stadium	W 36 – 34	28,009	1–1
3	July 14	Stampeders	Rogers Centre	W 27 – 24	20,242	2–1
4	July 23	Lions	Rogers Centre	W 24 – 20	19,709	3–1
5	July 29	@ Alouettes	Molson Stadium	L 41 – 10	25,012	3–2
6	August 6	@ Eskimos	Commonwealth Stadium	W 29 – 28	31,888	4–2
7	August 14	Alouettes	Rogers Centre	W 37 – 22	22,311	5–2
8	August 20	Tiger-Cats	Rogers Centre	L 16 – 12	24,493	5–3
9	Bye					5–3
10	September 6	@ Tiger-Cats	Ivor Wynne Stadium	L 28 – 13	30,319	5–4
11	September 11	@ Lions	Empire Field	L 37 – 16	22,703	5–5
12	September 19	Blue Bombers	Rogers Centre	W 17 – 13	19,662	6–5
13	September 26	Eskimos	Moncton Stadium	L 24 – 6	20,725	6–6
14	October 2	Roughriders	Rogers Centre	L 27 – 16	23,873	6–7
15	October 9	@ Roughriders	Mosaic Stadium	W 24 – 19	30,048	7–7
16	October 15	Tiger-Cats	Rogers Centre	L 30 – 3	25,181	7–8
17	October 23	@ Blue Bombers	Canad Inns Stadium	W 27 – 8	23,446	8–8
18	October 29	Alouettes	Rogers Centre	L 37 – 30	22,427	8–9
19	November 7	@ Alouettes	Molson Stadium	W 30 – 4	25,012	9–9

== Roster ==
2010 Toronto Argonauts final roster
Quarterbacks: 12 Dalton Bell; 6 Danny Brannagan; 1 Cleo Lemon; Running backs: 3 Cory Boyd; 40 Bryan Crawford; 44 Peter Quinney; 34 Dwayne Wright; Receivers: 88 Mike Bradwell; 18 Ryan Christian; 80 Jeremaine Copeland; 32 Andre Durie; 15 Reggie McNeal; 2 Chad Owens; 82 Chad Rempel LS; 89 Spencer Watt	Offensive linemen: 59 Joe Eppele T/G; 61 Cedric Gagné-Marcoux G; 67 Jeff Keeping G; 56 Rob Murphy T; 64 Dominic Picard C; 65 Taylor Robertson G; 54 Chris Van Zeyl T; Defensive linemen: 78 Adriano Belli DT; 96 Alex Buzbee DE; 99 Ronald Flemons DE; 9 Ricky Foley DE; 94 Kevin Huntley DT; 95 E. J. Kuale DE; 79 Eric Taylor DT	Linebackers: 5 Tristan Black; 35 Kevin Eiben; 46 Jason Pottinger; 37 Jeremy Unertl; 26 Jordan Younger; Defensive backs: 39 Matt Black; 24 Evan McCollough; 28 Byron Parker; 10 Willie Pile; 21 Lin-J Shell; 25 Sean Smalls	Special teams: 7 Noel Prefontaine P/K; 13 Grant Shaw K/P; Reserve roster: 63 Shannon Boatman T; 17 Michael Grant DB; 16 Brandon Rideau WR; 66 Jonathan St-Pierre C; Practice roster: 20 Anthony Alridge RB; 92 Matthias Askew DT; 69 Andre Barbour T; 87 DJ Boldin WR; 85 Keith Godding WR; 36 Alphonso Hodge DB	Injured list: 8 Joshua Abrams DB (1 Game); 41 Tang Bacheyie LB (9 Game); 30 Jamie Boreham P/K (9 Game); 11 Delroy Clarke DB (1 Game); 90 Adrian Davis DT (9 Game); 14 Ken Dorsey QB (1 Game); 91 Ben Ishola DE (1 Game); 33 Jeff Johnson RB (1 Game); 23 Willie Middlebrooks DB (1 Game); 4 James Robinson WR (1 Game); Italics indicates American player Roster updated 2026-05-11; Depth Chart; Transactions (argonauts.ca); Transactions (cfl.ca)

== Awards and records ==
=== CFL Eastern All-Stars ===
- RB – Cory Boyd, CFL Eastern All-Star
- OT – Rob Murphy, CFL Eastern All-Star
- DT – Kevin Huntley, CFL Eastern All-Star
- LB – Kevin Eiben, CFL Eastern All-Star
- DB – Lin-J Shell, CFL Eastern All-Star
- S – Willie Pile, CFL Eastern All-Star
- ST – Chad Owens, CFL Eastern All-Star

== Playoffs ==
=== Schedule ===
Round	Date	Opponent	Location	Final score	Attendance
East Semi-Final	November 14	@ Tiger-Cats	Ivor Wynne Stadium	W 16 – 13	27,828
East Final	November 21	@ Alouettes	Olympic Stadium	L 48 – 17	58,021

=== Bracket ===
November 14: Division Semi-Finals
E3	Toronto Argonauts	16
E2	Hamilton Tiger-Cats	13
W3	BC Lions	38
W2	Saskatchewan Roughriders	41*

November 21: Division Finals
E3	Toronto Argonauts	17
E1	Montreal Alouettes	48
W2	Saskatchewan Roughriders	20
W1	Calgary Stampeders	16

November 28: 98th Grey Cup; Commonwealth Stadium – Edmonton
E1	Montreal Alouettes	21
W2	Saskatchewan Roughriders	18

*-Team won in Overtime.

=== East Semi-Final ===
Toronto at Hamilton

Team	1	2	3	4	Total
• Argonauts	3	0	10	3	16
Tiger-Cats	0	6	0	7	13

- Date: November 14
- Location: Ivor Wynne Stadium
  Hamilton, ON
- Game start: 1:00 PM EST
- Game attendance: 27,828
- TV announcers (TSN): Rod Black (Play by Play), Duane Forde (Colour)

=== East Final ===
Toronto at Montreal

Team	1	2	3	4	Total
Argonauts	0	6	3	8	17
• Alouettes	17	10	7	14	48

- Date: November 21
- Location: Olympic Stadium
  Montreal, QC
- Game start: 1:00 PM EST
- Game attendance: 58,021
- Game weather: None (Closed Stadium)
- Referee: Jake Ireland
- TV announcers (TSN): Rod Black (Play by Play), Duane Forde (Colour), Sara Orlesky (Sideline)
