= 2010 BC Lions season =

Canadian football team season

- General manager: Wally Buono
- Head coach: Wally Buono
- Home stadium: Empire Field

Results
- Record: 8–10
- Division place: 3rd, West
- Playoffs: Lost West Semi-Final
- Team MOP: Paul McCallum
- Team MOR: Solomon Elimimian

Uniform

The 2010 BC Lions season was the 53rd season for the team in the Canadian Football League (CFL) and their 57th overall. The Lions finished the season in third place in the West Division with a second consecutive 8–10 record and qualified for the playoffs by winning their last game of the season. If they had lost, the Edmonton Eskimos would have qualified instead. The team had a dismal start, posting a 1–7 record to start the season, but won seven of their last 10 games to qualify for the playoffs for the 14th consecutive season. The Lions played the Saskatchewan Roughriders in the West Semi-Final, but lost the game in double overtime 41–38.

Due to renovations to BC Place, the Lions played at a temporary stadium located on the site of their old home field, Empire Stadium. Additionally, Head Coach and General Manager Wally Buono announced that training camp would be held in Kamloops for the next three seasons, beginning with 2010.

== Offseason ==
=== CFL draft ===
Round	Pick	Player	Position	School/Club team
1	4	Danny Watkins	OT	Baylor
2	10	Shawn Gore	WR	Bishop's
3	16	Joash Gesse	LB	Montréal
3	20	Hamid Mahmoudi	DB	Montréal
4	24	Nate Binder	WR	Tusculum College
4	25	Akeem Foster	WR	St. Francis Xavier
5	34	Cauchy Muamba	DB	St. Francis Xavier
6	41	Adam Baboulas	OL	Saint Mary's
6	42	Matthew Chapdelaine	WR	Simon Fraser

== Preseason ==
Week	Date	Opponent	Score	Result	Attendance	Record
A	Sun, June 13	at Saskatchewan Roughriders	19–17	Win	29,227	1–0
B	Sun, June 20	Edmonton Eskimos	36–32	Loss	24,763	1–1

# Games played with white uniforms.

== Regular season ==
=== Season standings ===
West Division
Team	GP	W	L	T	PF	PA	Pts	
Calgary Stampeders	18	13	5	0	626	459	26	Details
Saskatchewan Roughriders	18	10	8	0	497	488	20	Details
BC Lions	18	8	10	0	466	466	16	Details
Edmonton Eskimos	18	7	11	0	382	545	14	Details

=== Season schedule ===
Week	Date	Opponent	Score	Result	Attendance	Record
1	Sun, July 4	at Edmonton Eskimos	25–10	Win	32,439	1–0
2	Sat, July 10	Saskatchewan Roughriders	37–18	Loss	27,528	1–1
3	Fri, July 16	Montreal Alouettes	16–12	Loss	25,162	1–2
4	Fri, July 23	at Toronto Argonauts	24–20	Loss	19,709	1–3
5	Fri, July 30	at Edmonton Eskimos	28–25	Loss	32,281	1–4
6	Sat, Aug 7	Calgary Stampeders	27–22	Loss	24,876	1–5
7	Thurs, Aug 12	at Saskatchewan Roughriders	37–13	Loss	30,048	1–6
8	Bye					1–6
9	Fri, Aug 27	Calgary Stampeders	48–35	Loss	25,127	1–7
10	Fri, Sept 3	at Montreal Alouettes	38–17	Win	25,012	2–7
11	Sat, Sept 11	Toronto Argonauts	37–16	Win	22,703	3–7
12	Sat, Sept 18	Hamilton Tiger-Cats	35–31	Loss	21,481	3–8
13	Sat, Sept 25	at Calgary Stampeders	29–10	Win	29,637	4–8
14	Sat, Oct 2	Winnipeg Blue Bombers	16–14	Win	23,186	5–8
15	Mon, Oct 11	at Winnipeg Blue Bombers	47–35 (2OT)	Loss	25,016	5–9
16	Sat, Oct 16	Edmonton Eskimos	31–28 (OT)	Loss	21,414	5–10
17	Fri, Oct 22	at Calgary Stampeders	36–31	Win	28,054	6–10
18	Sun, Oct 31	Saskatchewan Roughriders	23–17	Win	25,479	7–10
19	Sat, Nov 6	at Hamilton Tiger-Cats	23–21	Win	23,913	8–10

# Games played with colour uniforms.
# Games played with white uniforms.
# Games played with alternate uniforms.
# Games played with retro uniforms.

== Roster ==
2010 BC Lions final roster
Quarterbacks: 7 Jarious Jackson; 14 Travis Lulay; 13 Mike Reilly; Running backs: 32 Yonus Davis; 33 Andrew Harris; 46 Rolly Lumbala; 20 Jerome Messam; 25 Jamal Robertson; Receivers: 84 Emmanuel Arceneaux; 82 Steven Black; 85 Shawn Gore; 19 Paris Jackson; 81 Geroy Simon; 88 O'Neil Wilson	Offensive linemen: 55 Sherko Haji-Rasouli G; 67 Jon Hameister-Ries G; 66 Joe McGrath T; 53 Jesse Newman G; 63 Jovan Olafioye T/G; 64 Angus Reid C; 68 Justin Sorensen G/T; Defensive linemen: 98 Jonathan Brown DE; 90 Aaron Hunt DT; 97 Brent Johnson DT/DE; 96 Khalif Mitchell DT; 9 Keron Williams DE; Special teams: 4 Paul McCallum K/P; 70 Dan McCullough LS	Linebackers: 45 Jason Arakgi; 56 Solomon Elimimian; 51 Joash Gesse; 44 Adam Leonard; 42 Anton McKenzie; 47 James Yurichuk; Defensive backs: 24 Korey Banks; 3 Tad Crawford; 6 Stanley Franks; 37 David Hyland; 31 Dante Marsh; 34 Cauchy Muamba; 21 Ryan Phillips; 26 Anthony Reddick	Reserve roster: 11 Jeremy Geathers DE; 8 Trestin George DB; 48 Joe Henderson LB; 59 Dane Randolph T; 10 Sean Whyte K/P; Practice Roster: 86 Edward Britton WR; 18 Matt Chapdelaine WR; 87 Akeem Foster SB; 62 Nick Hennessey T; 58 Anthony Hoke DE; 94 Richard Jones DT; 41 Hamid Mahmoudi DB; 83 Nick Moore WR; 91 Sean Ortiz DE; 80 Darius Passmore WR; 35 Daylan Walker DB	Injured list: 57 Andrew Jones G (9 Game); 27 J. R. LaRose DB (9 Game); 23 Jamall Lee FB (9 Game); 92 Dominie Pittman DE (9 Game); 2 Davis Sanchez DB (9 Game); 54 Dean Valli C/G (9 Game); 98 Steve Williams DT (9 Game); Italics indicate American players Roster updated 2026-04-27; Depth Chart • Transactions

=== Coaching staff ===
2010 BC Lions staff
Front office: Owner, President and CEO – David Braley; General manager – Wally Buono; Director of player personnel – Roy Shivers; Player personnel coordinator and assistant to gm – Neil McEvoy; Player personnel assistant – Barron Miles; Northwest regional scout – Jeff Smith; Head coaches: Head coach – Wally Buono; Offensive coaches: Offensive coordinator and quarterbacks – Jacques Chapdelaine; Receivers – Travis Moore; Offensive line – Dan Dorazio; Offensive assistant – Chuck McMann	Defensive coaches: Defensive coordinator and linebackers – Mike Benevides; Defensive line – Rich Stubler; Defensive backs – Mark Washington; Defensive assistant – Barron Miles; Special teams coaches: Special teams coordinator – Chuck McMann; Strength and conditioning: Strength and conditioning trainer – Chris Boyko; → Coaching staff

== Player stats ==
As of the end of Week 13 (Game 12):

=== Passing ===
Player	Att.	Comp	%	Yards	TD	INT	Rating
Casey Printers	237	129	54.4	1731	10	6	81.4
Travis Lulay	318	205	64.5	2602	9	11	84.9
Jarious Jackson	48	26	54.2	293	0	3	46.6
Geroy Simon	1	1	100.0	14	0	0	143.8

=== Rushing ===
Player	Att.	Yards	Avg.	TD	Fumbles
Jamal Robertson	154	953	6.2	8	3
Travis Lulay	62	396	6.4	3	8
Yonus Davis	34	213	6.3	3	4
Jerome Messam	23	92	4.0	2	2
Casey Printers	13	75	5.8	1	4
Emmanuel Arceneaux	8	29	3.6	0	0
Jarious Jackson	11	26	2.4	0	0
Robert Jordan	4	22	5.5	0	0
Paul McCallum	2	20	10.0	0	0

=== Receiving ===
Player	No.	Yards	Avg.	Long	TD
Geroy Simon	78	1190	15.3	98	6
Emmanuel Arceneaux	67	1114	16.6	74	5
Paris Jackson	61	758	12.4	53	1
Jamal Robertson	54	387	7.2	26	1
Steven Black	22	370	16.8	65	5
Derick Armstrong	22	316	14.4	58	0
O'Neil Wilson	30	256	8.5	20	0

== Awards and records ==
- Solomon Elimimian (LB) – CFL's Most Outstanding Rookie Award

=== 2010 CFL All-Stars ===
- DB – Ryan Phillips, CFL All-Star
- K – Paul McCallum, CFL All-Star

=== CFL Western All-Stars ===
- OG – Jovan Olafioye, Western All-Star
- DE – Brent Johnson, Western All-Star
- LB – Korey Banks, Western All-Star
- DB – Ryan Phillips, Western All-Star
- K – Paul McCallum, Western All-Star
- ST – Yonus Davis, Western All-Star

== Playoffs ==
=== Schedule ===
Week	Game	Date	Time	Opponent	Score	Result	Attendance
20	West Semi-Final	Nov 14	1:30 PM PST	at Saskatchewan Roughriders	41–38 (2OT)	Loss	29,215

# Games played with white uniforms.

=== Bracket ===
November 14: Division Semi-Finals
E3	Toronto Argonauts	16
E2	Hamilton Tiger-Cats	13
W3	BC Lions	38
W2	Saskatchewan Roughriders	41*

November 21: Division Finals
E3	Toronto Argonauts	17
E1	Montreal Alouettes	48
W2	Saskatchewan Roughriders	20
W1	Calgary Stampeders	16

November 28: 98th Grey Cup; Commonwealth Stadium – Edmonton
E1	Montreal Alouettes	21
W2	Saskatchewan Roughriders	18

*-Team won in Overtime.

=== West Semi-Final ===
BC at Saskatchewan

Team	1	2	3	4	OT	2OT	Total
Lions	3	13	3	8	8	3	38
• Roughriders	4	3	7	13	8	6	41

- Date: November 14
- Location: Mosaic Stadium at Taylor Field
  Regina, SK
- Game start: 1:30 PM PST
- Game attendance: 29,215
- TV announcers (TSN): Chris Cuthbert (Play by Play), Glen Suitor (Colour), Farhan Lalji (Sideline)
