= 2010 Calgary Stampeders season =

Canadian football team season

- General manager: John Hufnagel
- President: Lyle Bauer
- Head coach: John Hufnagel
- Home stadium: McMahon Stadium

Results
- Record: 13–5
- Division place: 1st, West
- Playoffs: Lost West Final

Uniform

The 2010 Calgary Stampeders season was the 53rd season for the team in the Canadian Football League (CFL) and their 72nd overall. The Stampeders finished in first place in the West Division with a 13–5 record. They attempted to win their 7th Grey Cup championship, but they lost in the West Final.

== Offseason ==
=== CFL draft ===
Round	Pick	Player	Position	School/Club team
1	5	Rob Maver	K/P	Guelph
2	13	Taurean Allen	DB	Wilfrid Laurier
3	17	John Bender	OL	Nevada
3	21	J'Michael Deane	OL	Michigan State
5	37	Karl McCartney	LB	Saint Mary's
6	46	Oamo Culbreath	OL	British Columbia

== Preseason ==
Week	Date	Opponent	Score	Result	Attendance	Record
A	Sun, June 13	at Edmonton Eskimos	23–21	Win	33,708	1–0
B	Sun, June 20	vs. Saskatchewan Roughriders	41–17	Win	29,050	2–0

== Regular season ==
=== Season standings ===
West Division
Team	GP	W	L	T	PF	PA	Pts	
Calgary Stampeders	18	13	5	0	626	459	26	Details
Saskatchewan Roughriders	18	10	8	0	497	488	20	Details
BC Lions	18	8	10	0	466	466	16	Details
Edmonton Eskimos	18	7	11	0	382	545	14	Details

=== Season schedule ===
Week	Date	Opponent	Score	Result	Attendance	Record
1	Thurs, July 1	vs. Toronto Argonauts	30–16	Win	29,333	1–0
2	Sat, July 10	at Hamilton Tiger-Cats	23–22	Win	25,248	2–0
3	Wed, July 14	at Toronto Argonauts	27–24	Loss	20,242	2–1
4	Sat, July 24	vs. Saskatchewan Roughriders	40–20	Win	35,650	3–1
5	Sat, July 31	vs. Winnipeg Blue Bombers	23–20	Win	30,150	4–1
6	Sat, Aug 7	at BC Lions	27–22	Win	24,876	5–1
7	Sun, Aug 15	vs. Edmonton Eskimos	56–15	Win	30,242	6–1
8	Bye					6–1
9	Fri, Aug 27	at BC Lions	48–35	Win	25,127	7–1
10	Mon, Sept 6	vs. Edmonton Eskimos	52–5	Win	34,559	8–1
11	Fri, Sept 10	at Edmonton Eskimos	36–20	Win	35,349	9–1
12	Fri, Sept 17	at Saskatchewan Roughriders	43–37 (OT)	Loss	30,048	9–2
13	Sat, Sept 25	vs. BC Lions	29–10	Loss	29,637	9–3
14	Fri, Oct 1	vs. Montreal Alouettes	46–21	Win	31,167	10–3
15	Mon, Oct 11	at Montreal Alouettes	46–19	Loss	25,012	10–4
16	Sun, Oct 17	at Saskatchewan Roughriders	34–26	Win	30,048	11–4
17	Fri, Oct 22	vs. BC Lions	36–31	Loss	28,054	11–5
18	Fri, Oct 29	vs. Hamilton Tiger-Cats	55–24	Win	27,644	12–5
19	Sat, Nov 6	at Winnipeg Blue Bombers	35–32	Win	22,056	13–5

== Roster ==
2010 Calgary Stampeders final roster
Quarterbacks: 1 Henry Burris; 17 Daryll Clark; 4 Drew Tate; Running backs: 9 Jon Cornish; 26 Rob Cote; 21 Joffrey Reynolds; Receivers': 23 Jabari Arthur; 83 Romby Bryant; 87 Arjei Franklin; 82 Nik Lewis; 85 Ken-Yon Rambo; 84 Landan Talley	Offensive linemen: 65 Ben Archibald T; 62 Stanley Bryant T; 68 Rob Lazeo C/G; 59 Steve Myddelton G; 66 Tim O'Neill C; 67 Dimitri Tsoumpas G; Defensive linemen: 95 DeVone Claybrooks DT; 39 Charleston Hughes DE; 77 Tom Johnson DT; 99 Corey Mace DT; 46 Robert McCune DE; 44 Justin Phillips DE	Linebackers: 37 Marc Calixte; 40 Mike Cornell; 11 Malik Jackson; 45 Karl McCartney; 12 Juwan Simpson; Defensive backs: 0 Taurean Allen; 33 Dwight Anderson; 27 Brandon Browner; 14 Milt Collins; 7 Eric Fraser; 30 Brandon Isaac; 31 Wes Lysack; 25 Keon Raymond; 28 Brandon Smith	Special teams: 56 Randy Chevrier LS; 16 Burke Dales P; 6 Rob Maver K; Reserve roster: 91 Tearrius George DE; 24 Deon Murphy WR; 8 Siddeeq Shabazz LB; Practice Roster: 19 Raymond Brown DB; 35 Johnnie Dixon DB; 61 Gerald Cadogan T; 54 Zac Carlson G; 57 Oamo Culbreath T; 81 Blaine Kruger WR; 32 Rafael Little RB	Injured list: 29 Ray Cheatham DB; 60 Dan Comiskey G; 80 Johnny Forzani WR; 63 Jon Gott G; 53 Ed Harrison T; 42 Mike Labinjo DE; 94 Michael Landry DT; 92 Khari Long DE; 34 Jesse Lumsden RB; 96 Miguel Robédé DT; 2 P. K. Sam SB; Suspended: Brandon Jamison LB; Curtis Vizza OL; Italics indicate American player Roster updated 2026-04-29

== Player stats ==
=== Passing ===
Player	Att	Comp	%	Yards	TD	INT	Rating
Henry Burris	559	370	66.2	4945	38	20	101.9
Drew Tate	62	44	71.0	521	7	0	133.9

=== Rushing ===
Player	Att	Yards	Avg	TD	Fumbles
Joffrey Reynolds	217	1200	5.5	8	1
Jon Cornish	85	618	7.3	0	3
Henry Burris	70	491	7.0	3	6
Drew Tate	36	189	5.3	5	1
Jesse Lumsden	4	40	10.0	1	0

=== Receiving ===
Player	No.	Yards	Avg	Long	TD
Nik Lewis	90	1262	14.0	74	9
Romby Bryant	78	1170	15.0	68	15
Ken-Yon Rambo	72	1172	16.3	100	8
Arjei Franklin	42	523	12.5	39	2
Joffrey Reynolds	37	286	7.7	23	0
Deon Murphy	25	271	10.8	48	4

== Awards and records ==
- CFL's Most Outstanding Player Award – Henry Burris (QB)
- CFL's Most Outstanding Offensive Lineman Award – Ben Archibald (OT)
- Tom Pate Memorial Award – Wes Lysack (DB)

=== 2010 CFL All-Stars ===
- CB – Dwight Anderson
- OT – Ben Archibald
- CB – Brandon Browner
- QB – Henry Burris
- SB – Nik Lewis
- LB – Juwan Simpson
- OG – Dimitri Tsoumpas

=== CFL Western All-Stars ===
- CB – Dwight Anderson
- OT – Ben Archibald
- CB – Brandon Browner
- WR – Romby Bryant
- QB – Henry Burris
- DT – DeVone Claybrooks
- P – Burke Dales
- DE – Charleston Hughes
- DT – Tom Johnson
- SB – Nik Lewis
- RB – Joffrey Reynolds
- LB – Juwan Simpson
- OG – Dimitri Tsoumpas

=== Milestones ===
- On July 1, Joffrey Reynolds set a Calgary Stampeders' record with his 29th 100-yard rushing game, surpassing Earl Lunsford who had 28.
- On Sept 10, Joffrey Reynolds became the Calgary Stampeders' all-time leader in rushing yards, surpassing Kelvin Anderson's record of 8,292 yards.

== Playoffs ==
=== Schedule ===
Week	Date	Time	Opponent	Score	Result	Attendance
20	Bye					
21	Nov 21	2:30 PM MST	vs. Saskatchewan Roughriders	20–16	Loss	35,650

=== Bracket ===
November 14: Division Semi-Finals
E3	Toronto Argonauts	16
E2	Hamilton Tiger-Cats	13
W3	BC Lions	38
W2	Saskatchewan Roughriders	41*

November 21: Division Finals
E3	Toronto Argonauts	17
E1	Montreal Alouettes	48
W2	Saskatchewan Roughriders	20
W1	Calgary Stampeders	16

November 28: 98th Grey Cup; Commonwealth Stadium – Edmonton
E1	Montreal Alouettes	21
W2	Saskatchewan Roughriders	18

*-Team won in Overtime.

=== West Final ===
Saskatchewan at Calgary

Team	1	2	3	4	Total
• Roughriders	0	14	6	0	20
Stampeders	11	0	4	1	16

- Date: November 21
- Location: McMahon Stadium
  Calgary, AB
- Game start: 2:30 PM MST
- Game attendance: 35,650
- Referee: Andre Proulx
- TV announcers (TSN): Chris Cuthbert (Play by play), Glen Suitor (Colour), Farhan Lalji (Sideline)
