= Taurean =

Taurean is a unisex given name. Notable people with the name include:

- Taurean Allen (born 1987), Canadian football player
- Taurean Blacque (1940–2022), American actor
- Taurean Green (born 1986), American basketball player
- Taurean Henderson (born 1983), American football player
- Taurean Yves Jordan
- Taurean Manders (born 1986), Bermudian footballer
- Taurean Nixon (born 1991), American football player
- Taurean Prince (born 1994), American basketball player
- Taurean York (born 2005), American football player
