= John Bender =

John Bender may refer to:

- John Bender (fl. 1870s), American serial killer among Bloody Benders
- John R. Bender (1882–1928), American football player and coach, basketball coach, baseball coach
- Jonathan Bender (born 1981), basketball player
- John Bender (Ohio politician), member of the Ohio House of Representatives from 1993 to 2000
- John Bender, a fictional character in the film The Breakfast Club
- John Bender (gridiron football) (born 1987), Canadian football offensive lineman
- Jack Bender (born 1949), American television and film director, actor, television producer, and writer
- John Bender (shot putter) (born 1966), American shot putter, 1988 NCAA outdoor runner-up for the Fresno State Bulldogs track and field team
