= Newtonbrook =

Coordinates: 43°47′N 79°25′W

- Neighbourhood of Toronto
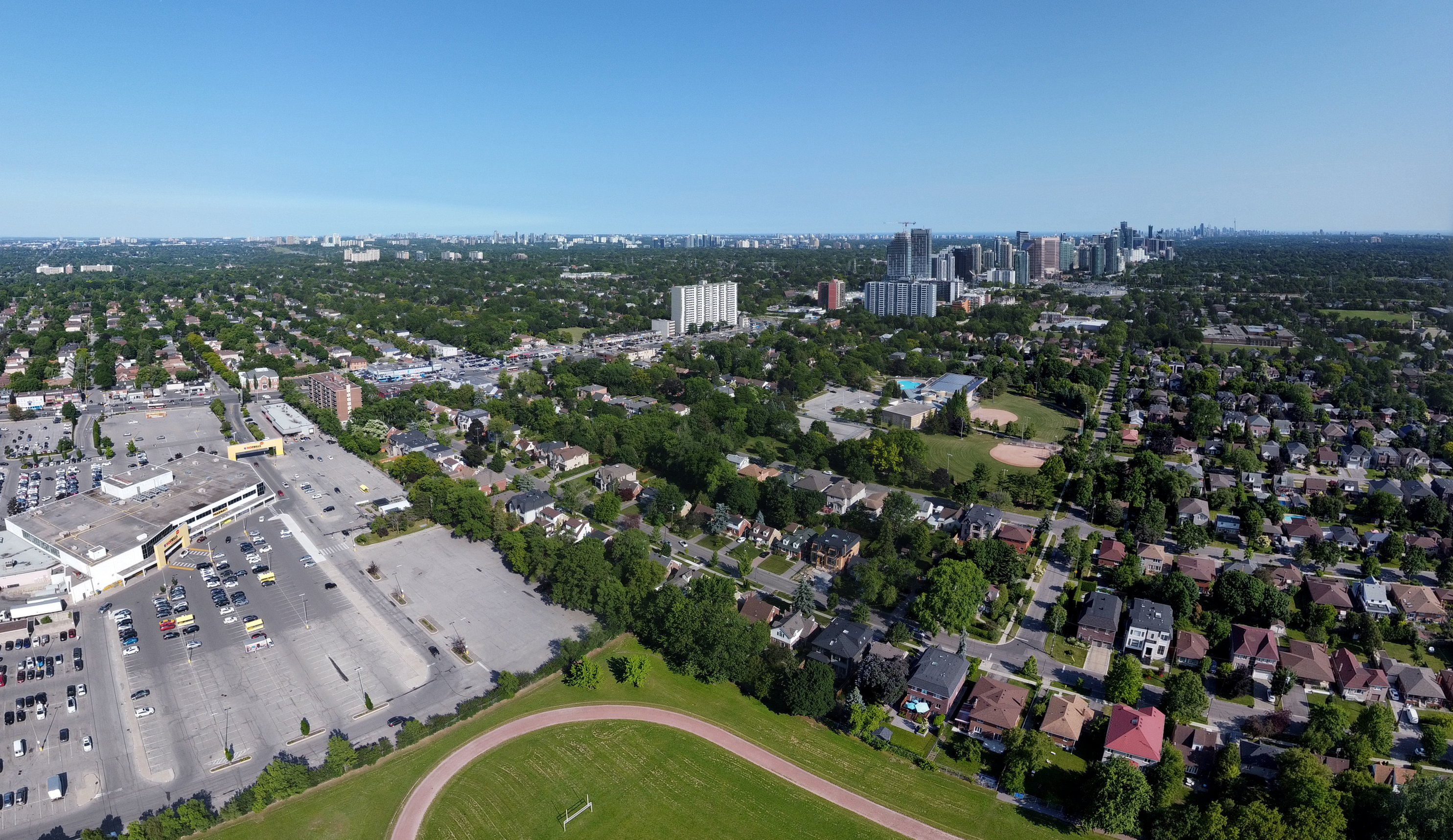
- Aerial view of Newtonbrook from Newtonbrook Secondary School

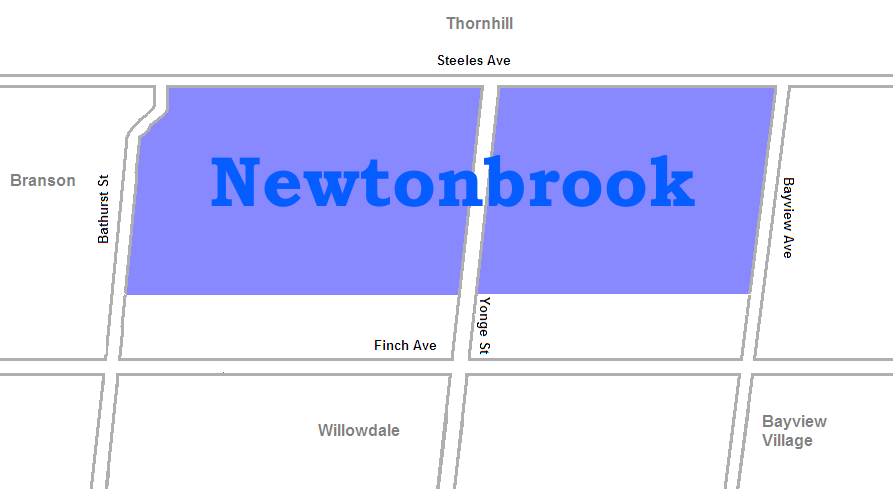
- Newtownbrook and surroundings
- Municipality established: 1850 York Township
- Changed municipality: 1922 North York from York Township
- Changed municipality: 1998 Toronto from North York

Newtonbrook is a neighbourhood in Toronto, Ontario, Canada. It is located in the area around Yonge Street and Finch Avenue in the district of North York between the east and west branches of the Don River. Officially, the area is divided into two neighbourhoods; Newtonbrook West and Newtonbrook East.

== History ==
The area was settled by Europeans in the early 19th century. Newtonbrook's early industries included saw and grist mills on the east and west branches of the Don River. The town's Newton Brook Wesleyan Church was named after Reverend Robert Newton.

In 1847, Lieutenant Colonel William S. Durie of The Queen's Own Rifles of Canada subdivided part of his Newtonbrook property. The resulting subdivision is now Drewry Avenue.

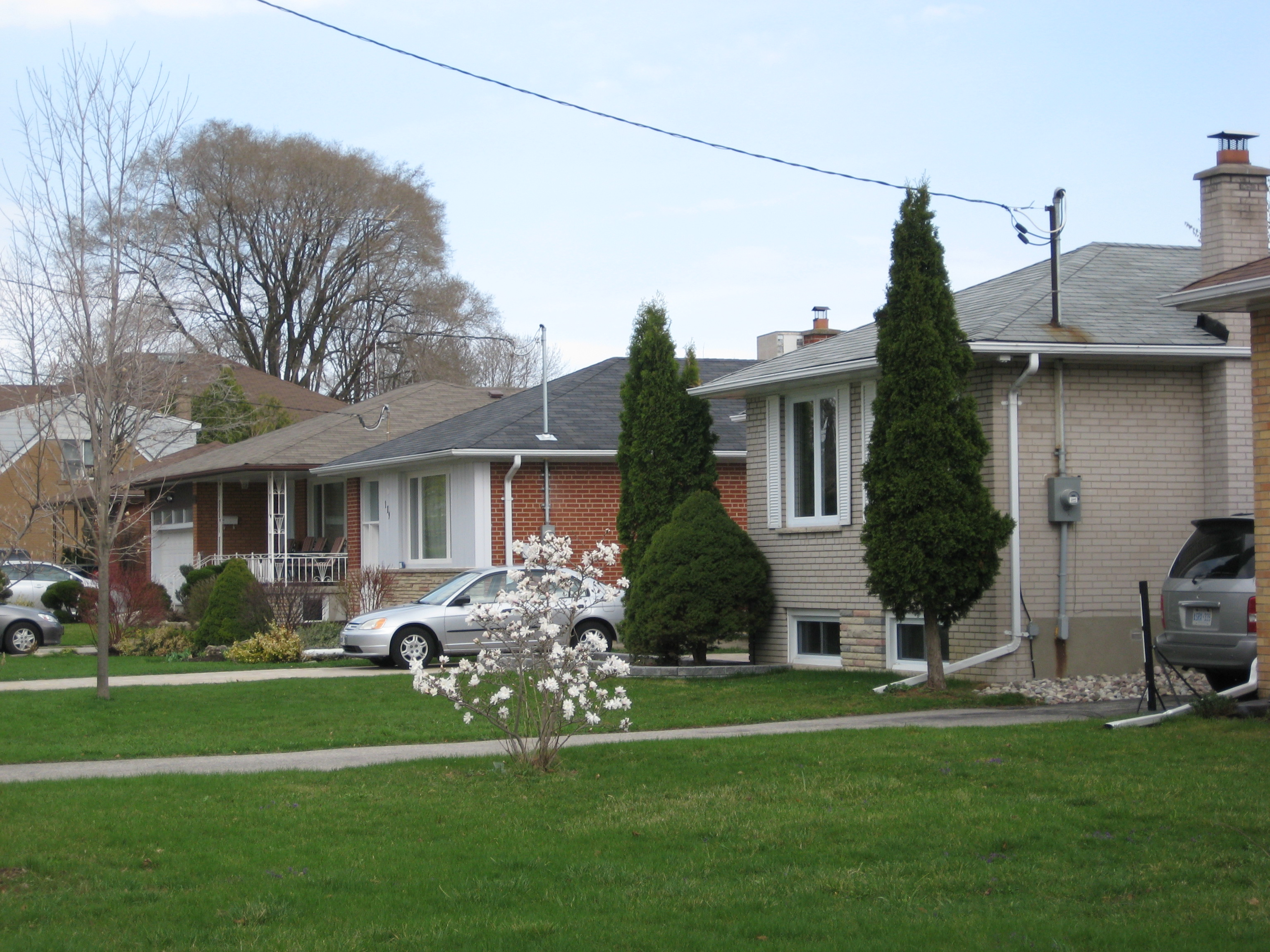
Residences in Newtonbrook. Residential developments in Newtonbrook began during the 1950s.

In the 1950s, Newtonbrook was subdivided for a massive residential development. Most of the town's landmarks were removed, except for the Newtonbrook Schoolhouse and the Newtonbrook General Store. Just one house from the original Drewry Avenue subdivision remains.

As of the end of 2006, Newtonbrook was the northernmost area of Toronto to be affected by the infill development (mainly along the Finch Ave. and Yonge St. corridors). Older detached and semi-detached houses from the 1950s were demolished (or converted to mixed residential-commercial use), with townhouse complexes built in their place. There is also an increasing number of new custom built homes in this neighbourhood. A new low-rise condo building was built on the northwest corner of Yonge and Drewry.

== Demographics ==
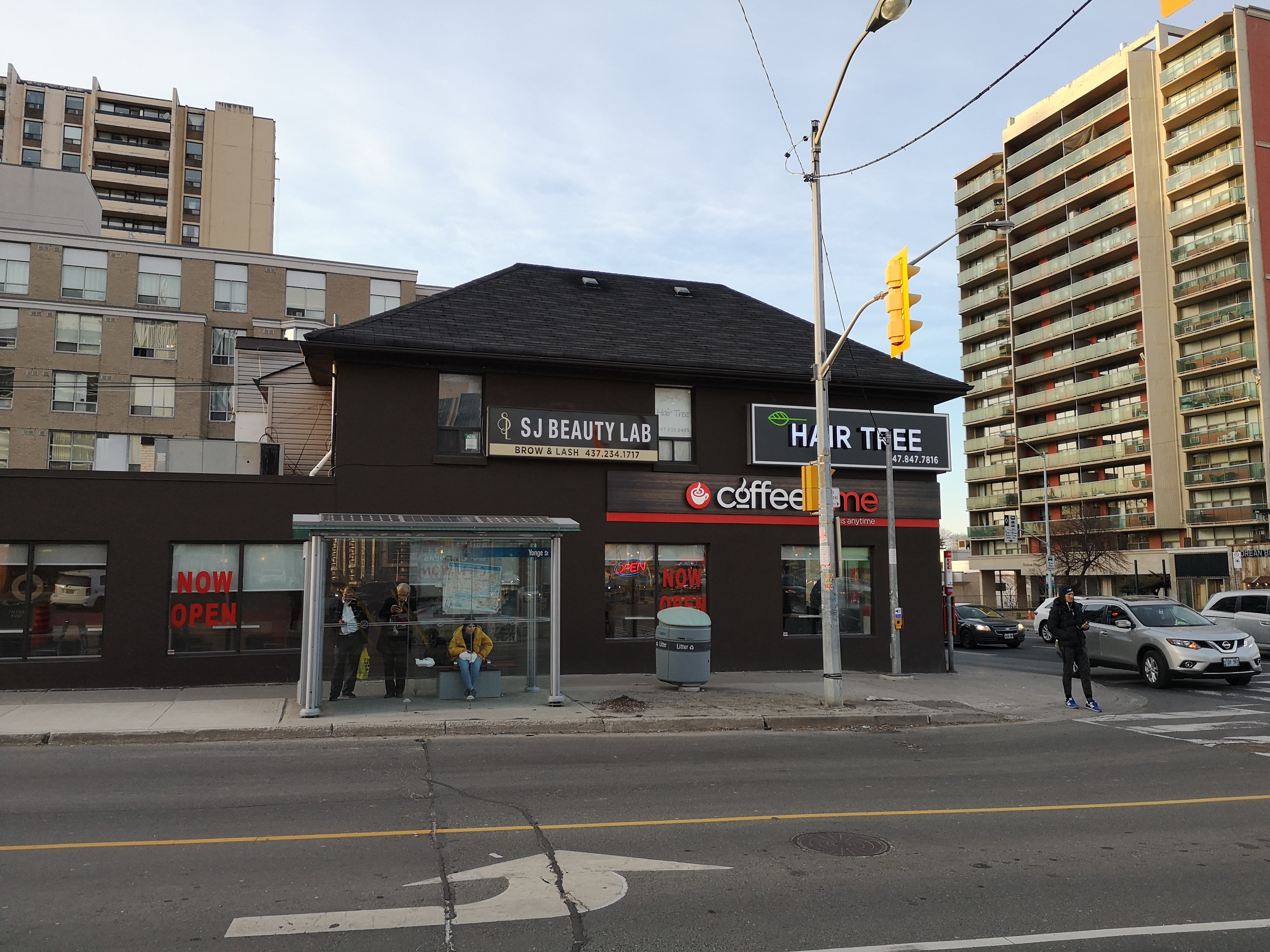
View of Newtonbrook from Drewry Avenue and Yonge Street

Newtonbrook contains a large community of Persian, Mandarin, Russian and Korean-speaking residents. English is the most spoken language of both Newtonbrook neighbourhoods, with Persian and Russian being the next most spoken languages of Newtonbrook West and Newtonbrook East, respectively.

The average income in the area is above the average for Toronto. Along with this, a majority of residents live in single detached or semi-detached houses which they own.

== Education ==
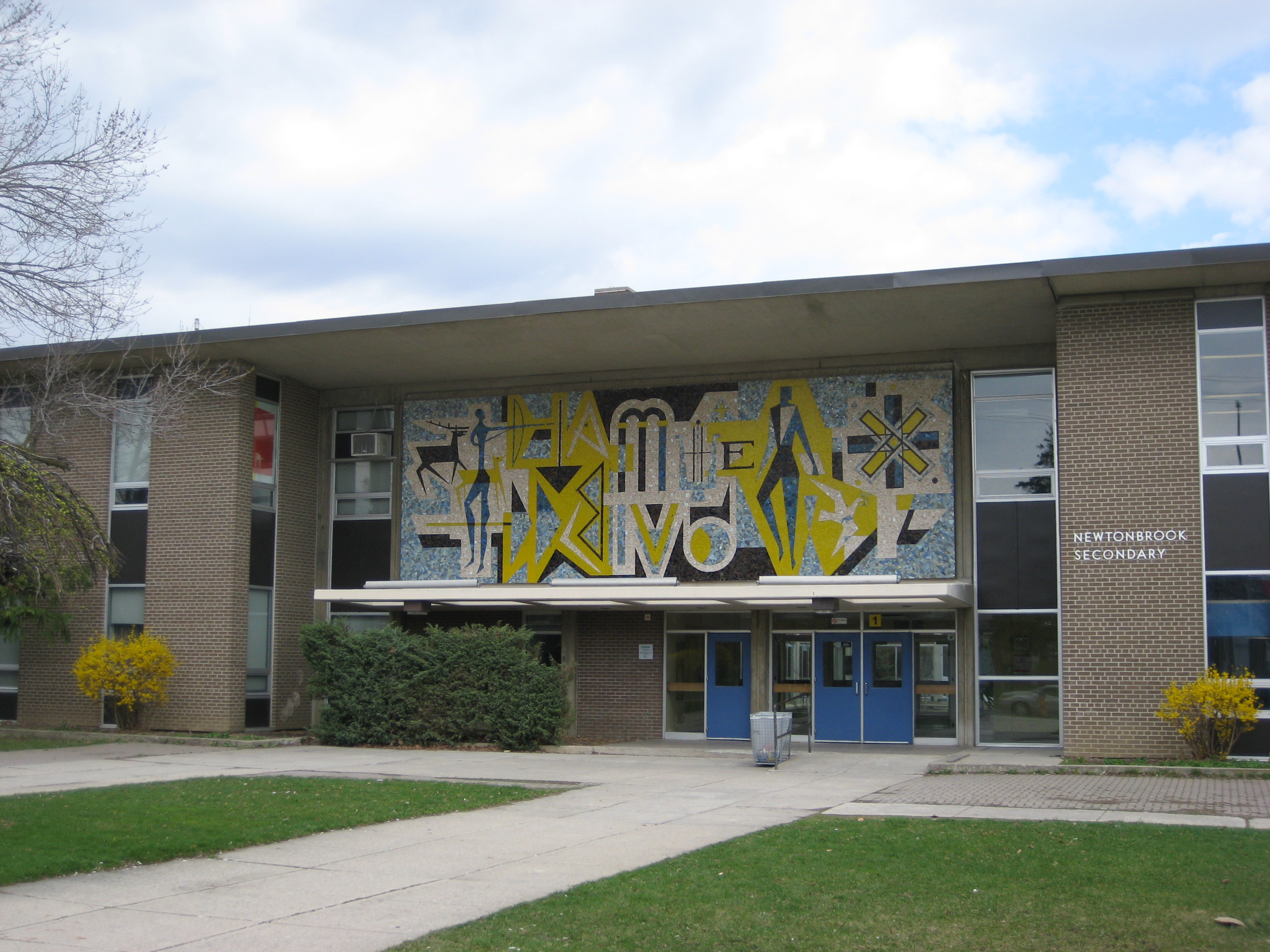
Newtonbrook Secondary School is one of three public secondary schools situated in Newtonbrook.

Three public school boards operate schools that offer primary and secondary education.

The Toronto District School Board (TDSB) is a secular public school board that operates two secondary schools in the neighbourhood, Newtonbrook Secondary School and Drewry Secondary School. Both schools are part of the North York Board of Education.

The Toronto Catholic District School Board (TCDSB) is a separate public school board that also operates an all-boys secondary school in Newtonbrook, Brebeuf College School. In addition to English-based public school boards, the Conseil scolaire catholique MonAvenir (CSCM) also operates a secondary school in Newtonbrook, École secondaire catholique Monseigneur-de-Charbonnel (formerly Lewis S. Beattie Secondary School). CSCM is a French-based separate public school board. The school and headquarters are leased from the TDSB. However before 1998, Brebeuf and Charbonnel were part of the Metropolitan Separate School Board when it was an English and French board at the time.

TCDSB and TDSB operate several schools in Newtonbrook that provide primary education. They include:

- Cummer Valley Middle School (TDSB), opened in 1960 as Northmount Junior High School
- Fisherville Senior Public School (TDSB)
- Pleasant Public School (TDSB)
- R. J. Lang Elementary and Middle School (TDSB)
- St. Agnes Catholic School (TCDSB)
- St. Paschal Baylon Separate School (TCDSB)

== Recreation ==
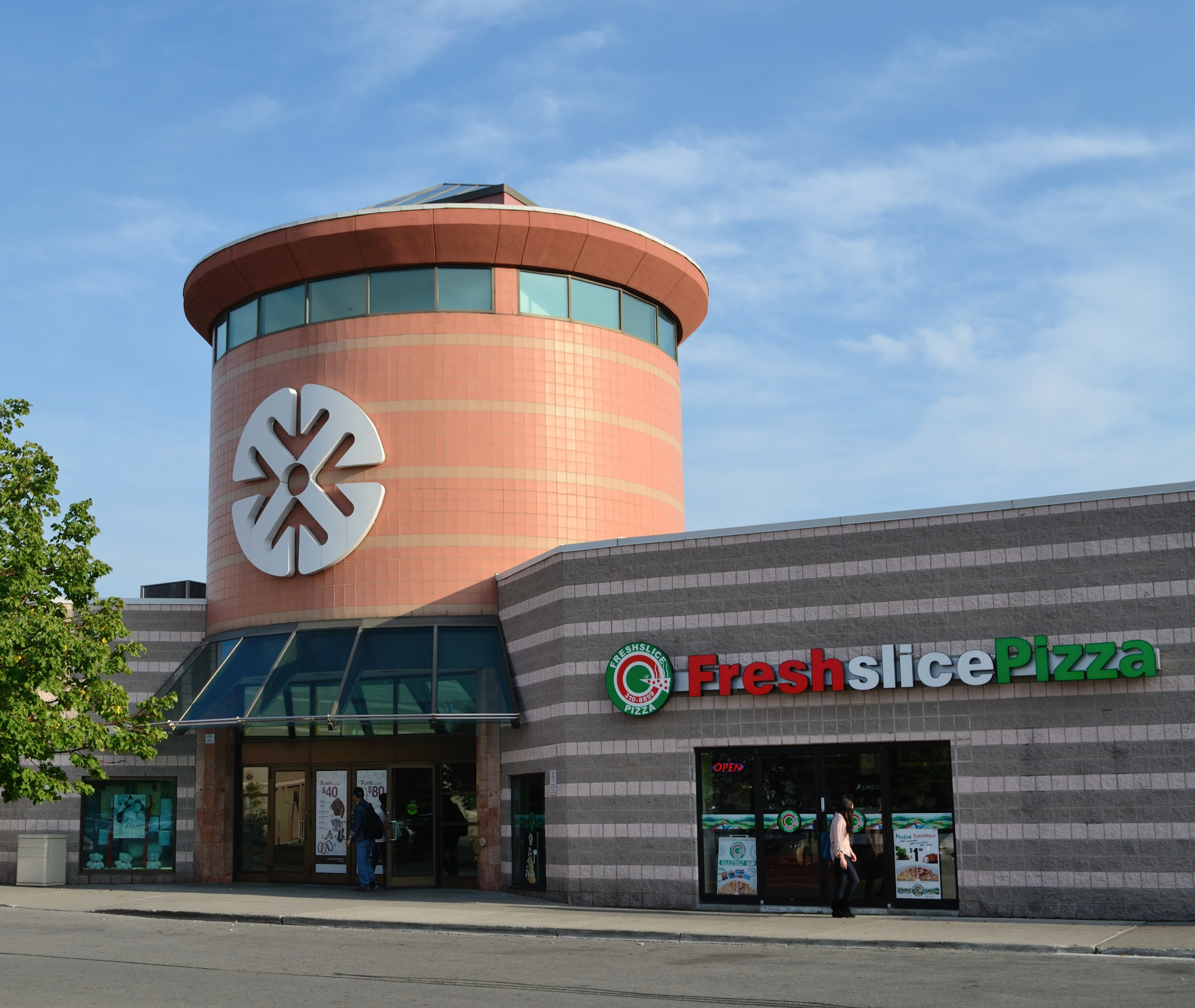
Centerpoint Mall is a shopping mall located in the north of the neighbourhood.

There are several shopping malls and plazas located within the neighbourhood, including Centerpoint Mall, on Steeles Avenue and Yonge Street, and Toronto Iranian Plaza. The former Newtonbrook Plaza at Yonge and Cummer was demolished in 2018-2019 for the development of M2M Condos.

Newtonbrook is also home to several municipal parks, as well as the Finch Hydro Corridor. Parks in the neighbourhood are managed by the Toronto Parks, Forestry and Recreation Division.

== Transportation ==
Public transportation in the neighbourhood is also serviced by the Toronto Transit Commission's (TTC) bus service. Newtonbrook is served by Finch subway station, which is the northern terminus of the Toronto Transit Commission's (TTC) Line 1 Yonge–University, located just south of the neighbourhood. In addition to TTC services, public transit services may also be accessed at Finch Bus Terminal, which provides access to GO Transit's commuter and regional buses. York Region Transit and Viva Rapid Transit may also be accessed from the terminal.

== Notable people ==
It is the birthplace and hometown of Nobel Prize winner and Canadian Prime Minister Lester B. Pearson. Pearson was born at a manse in the intersection of Yonge Street and Hendon Avenue, now the site of the North American Life Centre. His father was the local Methodist minister and Lester was born in the parsonage.

== See also ==
- List of neighbourhoods in Toronto
