= Hamid Mahmoudi =

Canadian gridiron football player (born 1985)

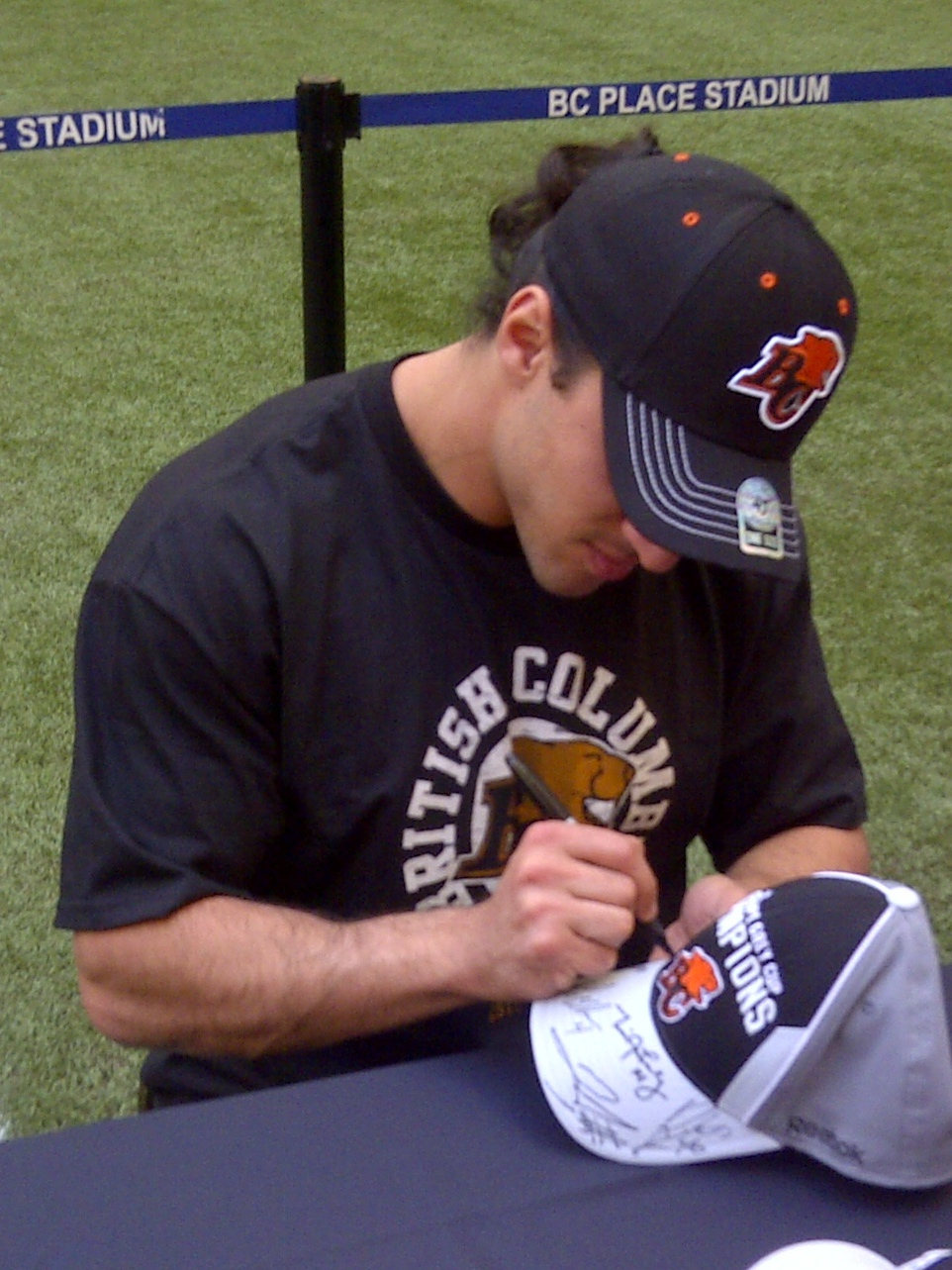
- Mahmoudi with the BC Lions in 2012

No. 41
- Position: Cornerback

Personal information
- Born: August 25, 1985 (age 41); Tehran, Iran
- Listed height: 5 ft 8 in (1.73 m)
- Listed weight: 177 lb (80 kg)

Career information
- University: Montréal
- CFL draft: 2010: 3rd round, 20th overall pick

Career history
- 2010–2011: BC Lions

Awards and highlights
- Grey Cup champion (2011)
- Stats at CFL.ca (archive)

Hamid Mahmoudi (born August 25, 1985) is an Iranian former professional Canadian football cornerback who played two seasons for the BC Lions of the Canadian Football League (CFL). He is a Grey Cup champion after winning with the Lions in 2011.

== University career ==
Mahmoudi played CIS football for the Montreal Carabins.

== Professional career ==
Mahmoudi was drafted 20th overall by the Lions in the 2010 CFL draft and signed a contract with the team on May 25, 2010. He spent the 2010 season on the practice roster, but played in seven games in 2011 where he recorded four special teams tackles. He was a member of the 99th Grey Cup championship team that year. He was released during training camp in the following season on June 14, 2012.
