= Chris Rwabukamba =

Rwandan gridiron football player (born 1987)

No. 46
- Position: Defensive back

Personal information
- Born: January 5, 1987 (age 39); Kigali, Rwanda
- Listed height: 5 ft 11 in (1.80 m)
- Listed weight: 190 lb (86 kg)

Career information
- College: Duke
- CFL draft: 2010: 4th round, 27th overall pick

Career history
- 2011–2012: Hamilton Tiger-Cats
- 2013–2014: Edmonton Eskimos
- 2015: BC Lions
- 2016–2017: Calgary Stampeders
- 2017: Edmonton Elks
- Stats at CFL.ca

Chris Rwabukamba (born January 5, 1987) is a Rwandan-Canadian professional football defensive back who played in the Canadian Football League (CFL). He was drafted 27th overall by the Hamilton Tiger-Cats in the 2010 CFL draft and signed with the team on June 1, 2011. He was also a member of the Edmonton Eskimos / Elks, BC Lions, and Calgary Stampeders. He played college football for the Duke Blue Devils where he was a team captain his senior year. He was born in Kigali, Rwanda and raised in Windsor, Ontario.
