= Chima Ihekwoaba =

Canadian football player (born 1988)

Chima H. Ihekwoaba
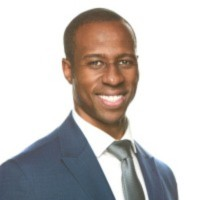
- Ihekwoaba in 2024

No. 90
- Position: Defensive end

Personal information
- Born: November 3, 1988 (age 38); Toronto, Ontario, Canada
- Listed height: 6 ft 4 in (1.93 m)
- Listed weight: 255 lb (116 kg)

Career information
- College: Wilfrid Laurier
- CFL draft: 2010: 2nd round, 14th overall pick

Career history
- 2010: Detroit Lions*
- 2010–2012: Montreal Alouettes
- * Offseason or practice squad member only

Awards and highlights
- Grey Cup champion (2010)
- Stats at CFL.ca (archive)

Chima Henry Ihekwoaba (born November 3, 1988) is a Canadian former professional football defensive end for the Montreal Alouettes of the Canadian Football League. He was drafted 14th overall by the Alouettes in the 2010 CFL draft and signed with the team after spending time with the NFL's Detroit Lions. He played college football for the Wilfrid Laurier Golden Hawks.

== Professional career ==
=== Detroit Lions ===
Ihekwoaba signed with the Detroit Lions on May 2, 2010, on the same day that he was drafted 14th overall by the Alouettes in the CFL draft. He was released by the Lions at the end of the NFL's preseason on August 30, 2010.

=== Montreal Alouettes ===
On September 15, 2010, it was announced that Ihekwoaba had signed a contract with the Montreal Alouettes.
