= Joe Eppele =

Canadian football player (born 1987)

No. 59
- Position: Offensive lineman

Personal information
- Born: August 12, 1987 (age 39); Squamish, British Columbia, Canada
- Listed height: 6 ft 8 in (2.03 m)
- Listed weight: 309 lb (140 kg)

Career information
- High school: Vancouver College
- College: Washington State
- CFL draft: 2010: 1st round, 2nd overall pick
- Expansion draft: 2013: 2nd round

Career history
- 2010–2013: Toronto Argonauts
- 2014: Ottawa Redblacks

Awards and highlights
- Grey Cup champion (2012)
- Stats at CFL.ca

Joseph Eppele (born August 12, 1987) is a Canadian former professional football offensive lineman. He was drafted second overall by the Toronto Argonauts in the 2010 CFL draft, being the first offensive lineman taken while being ranked fifth overall by the CFL's Amateur Scouting Bureau. He played college football for the Washington State Cougars.

== College career ==
Eppele attended Washington State University where he played college football for the Washington State Cougars from 2006-2009.

== Professional career ==
=== Toronto Argonauts ===
After a strong outing at the CFL Evaluation Camp, Eppele moved up six spots to become the fifth ranked player in the Canadian Football League’s Amateur Scouting Bureau rankings for players eligible in the 2010 CFL draft. On the day prior to the draft, the Toronto Argonauts traded the number one overall draft pick to the Saskatchewan Roughriders, along with the eighth overall pick, for punter Jamie Boreham and the second and fourth overall picks in the 2010 draft. Rather than drafting one outstanding and high ranked player, the Argonauts elected to trade in order to be able to draft two very highly ranked players; Eppele with the second overall pick and Cory Greenwood with the third overall pick (acquired from BC).

On May 18, 2010, it was announced that Eppele had signed a contract through the 2012 CFL season with the Toronto Argonauts. On December 31, 2012, Eppele signed a contract extension with the Argonauts through the 2014 CFL season.

=== Ottawa Redblacks ===
On December 16, 2013, Eppele was drafted by the Ottawa Redblacks in the 2013 CFL Expansion Draft. He missed the 2014 season due to injury.
