= Jorgen Hus =

Canadian gridiron football player (born 1989)

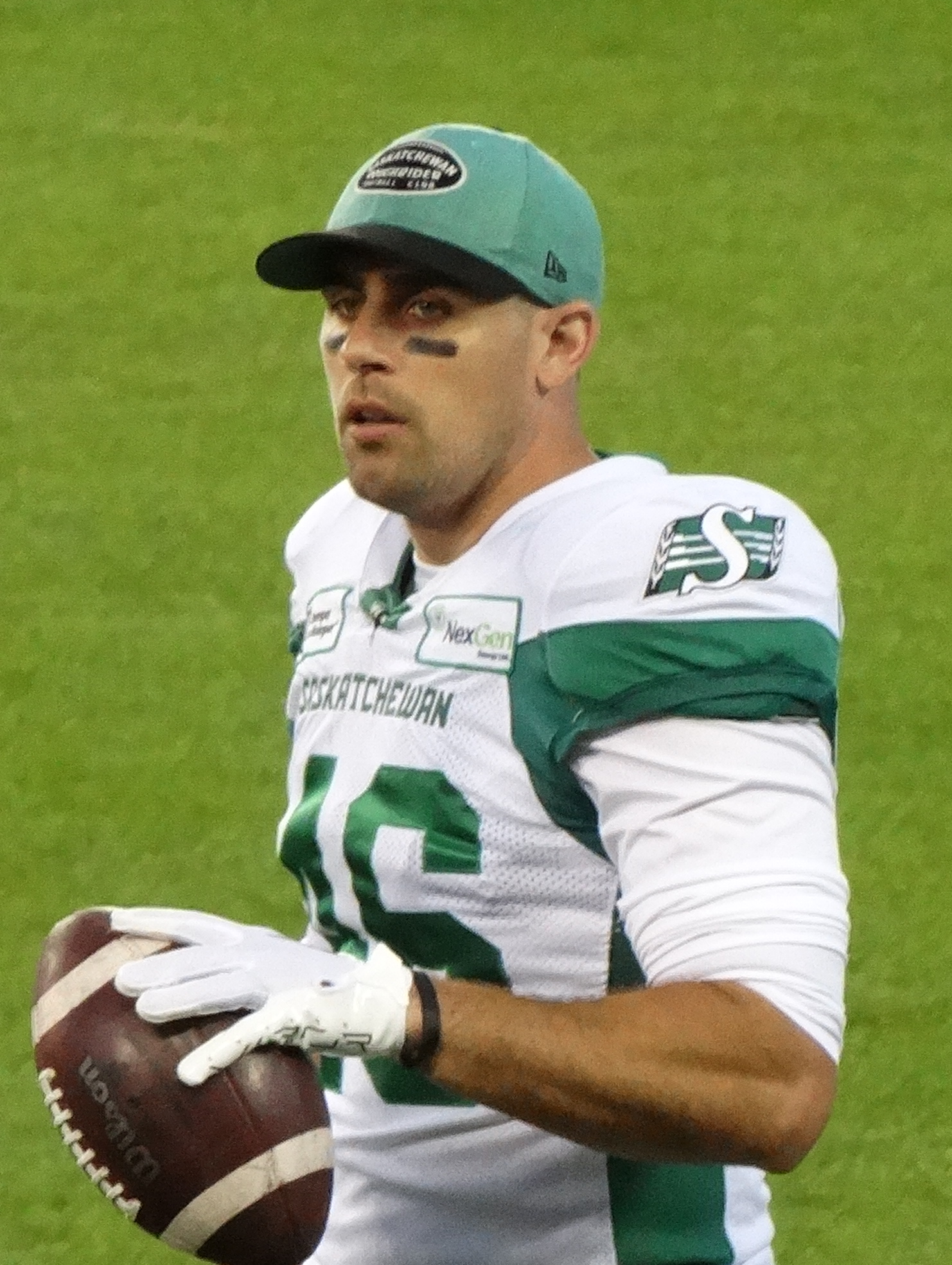
- Hus with the Saskatchewan Roughriders in 2024

Profile
- Position: Long snapper

Personal information
- Born: September 12, 1989 (age 37); Saskatoon, Saskatchewan, Canada
- Listed height: 6 ft 1 in (1.85 m)
- Listed weight: 230 lb (104 kg)

Career information
- CJFL: Saskatoon Hilltops
- University: Regina
- CFL draft: 2013: 4th round, 31st overall pick

Career history
- St. Louis Rams (2013)*; Seattle Seahawks (2014)*; St. Louis Rams (2014)*; Kansas City Chiefs (2015)*; Saskatchewan Roughriders (2015–2025)
- * Offseason or practice squad member only

Awards and highlights
- Grey Cup champion (2025); Jake Gaudaur Veterans' Trophy (2024)

Career CFL statistics as of 2025
- Games played: 167
- ST tackles: 25
- Stats at CFL.ca
- Stats at Pro Football Reference

Jorgen Hus (born September 12, 1989) is a Canadian former professional football long snapper. He played in ten seasons in the Canadian Football League, all with the Saskatchewan Roughriders, and won a Grey Cup championship with the Roughriders in 2025.

== Amateur career ==
Hus played CIS football for the Regina Rams and also played junior football for the Saskatoon Hilltops.

== Professional career ==
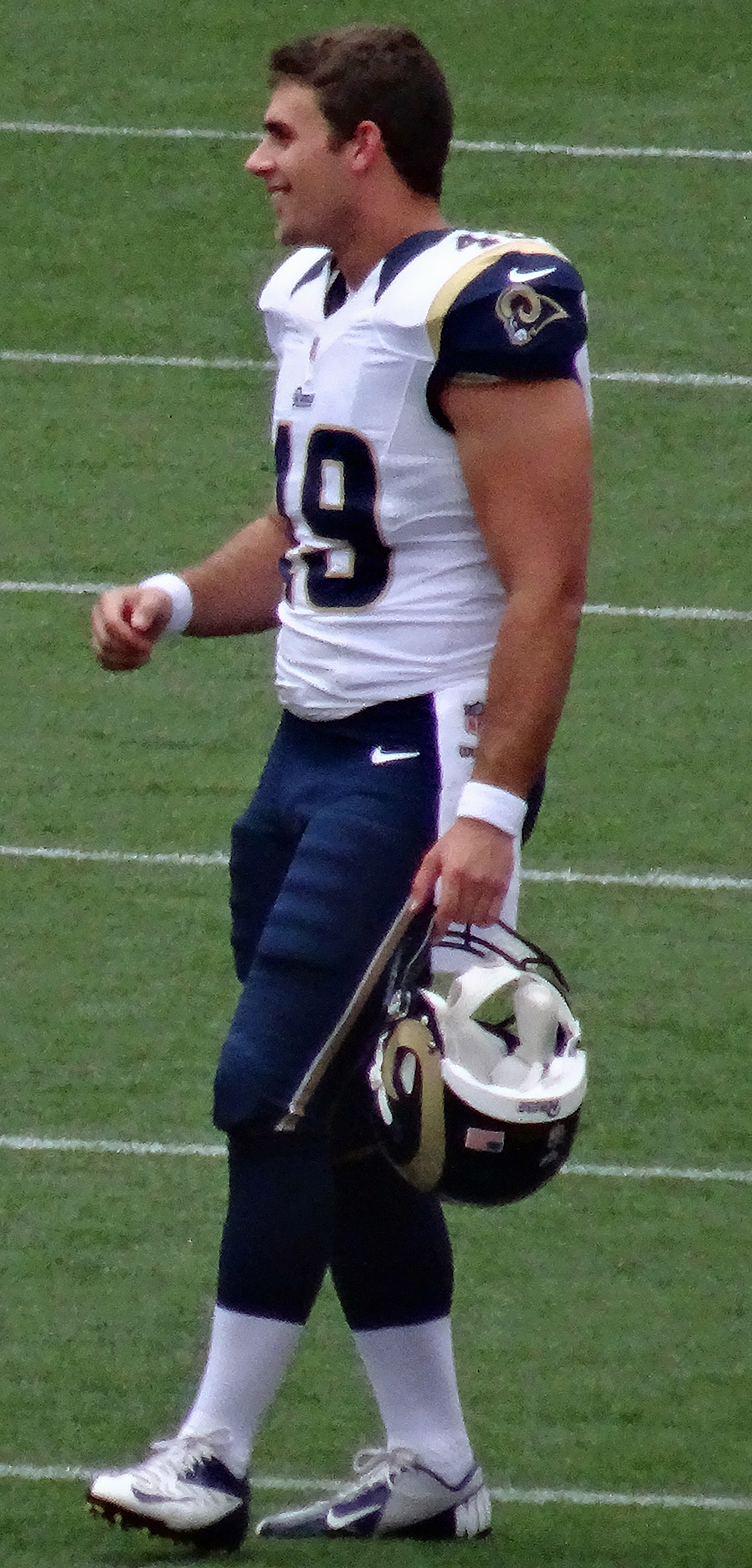
Hus with the St. Louis Rams in 2013

=== Early career ===
Hus was drafted in the fourth round, 31st overall by the Edmonton Eskimos in the 2013 CFL draft. However, he first spent time with the National Football League's St. Louis Rams, Seattle Seahawks, and Kansas City Chiefs from 2013 to 2014.

=== Saskatchewan Roughriders ===
Hus' CFL rights were traded to the Saskatchewan Roughriders for Cory Watson on May 11, 2015, and he signed with the Roughriders on May 21, 2015. He played in his first professional game on June 27, 2015, against the Winnipeg Blue Bombers. He played in all 18 regular season games in his rookie year in 2015 where he also recorded five special teams tackles.

Hus re-signed to a one-year contract extension with the Roughriders on December 16, 2020. He signed a two-year extension on November 14, 2023.

On April 23, 2026, Hus announced his retirement from professional football.
