= Curtis Dublanko =

Canadian football player (born 1988)

Profile
- Position: Linebacker

Personal information
- Born: February 12, 1988 (age 38); Thorsby, Alberta, Canada
- Listed height: 6 ft 0 in (1.83 m)
- Listed weight: 220 lb (100 kg)

Career information
- College: North Dakota
- CFL draft: 2010: 2nd round, 15th overall pick

Career history
- 2011–2013: Montreal Alouettes
- 2014: Edmonton Eskimos
- Stats at CFL.ca

Curtis Dublanko (born February 12, 1988) is a Canadian former professional football linebacker who played in the Canadian Football League (CFL). He was selected 15th overall by the Montreal Alouettes in the 2010 CFL draft, and signed with the team on April 2, 2011 after finishing his final year at the University of North Dakota. He played college football for the North Dakota Fighting Sioux.
