= Cory Watson =

Canadian football player (born 1984)

Concordia Stingers
- Title: Wide receiver
- CFL status: National

Personal information
- Born: March 27, 1984 (age 42); Dollard-des-Ormeaux, Quebec, Canada
- Listed height: 6 ft 3 in (1.91 m)
- Listed weight: 210 lb (95 kg)

Career information
- University: Concordia
- CFL draft: 2010: 2nd round, 9th overall pick

Career history

Playing
- 2010–2014: Winnipeg Blue Bombers
- 2015: Saskatchewan Roughriders*
- 2015–2017: Edmonton Eskimos
- 2018: BC Lions
- 2019: Saskatchewan Roughriders
- * Offseason or practice squad member only

Coaching
- 2022–present: Concordia Stingers (Wide receivers Coach)

Awards and highlights
- Grey Cup champion (2015)
- Stats at CFL.ca

Cory Watson (born March 27, 1984) is a wide receivers coach for the Concordia Stingers of U Sports football. He was formerly a professional Canadian football wide receiver who was drafted ninth overall by the Winnipeg Blue Bombers in the 2010 CFL draft and played for five seasons with the club. He was also a member of the Saskatchewan Roughriders, Edmonton Eskimos and BC Lions. He also played CIS football for the Stingers.

== Professional career ==
=== Winnipeg Blue Bombers ===
Watson joined the Winnipeg Blue Bombers after being drafted by them in the 2nd round of the 2010 CFL draft. In his rookie season in the league he played in 15 games, totalling 277 yards on 17 receptions. He caught his first touchdown pass in the final game of that season. Watson showed great improvement in his sophomore season racking up 793 yards on 69 catches, which is, to date, the best season of his career. Over the next three seasons Watson missed significant playing time due to injuries, playing in only 30 of a possible 54 games. During those 30 games he averaged only 38.2 yards per game on 3.1 receptions per game.

=== Saskatchewan Roughriders ===
On January 29, 2015, Watson and a 3rd round selection in the 2015 CFL draft were traded to the Saskatchewan Roughriders in exchange for Canadian receiver Kris Bastien, a 2nd round pick in the 2015 CFL draft and the rights to a player on Winnipeg's negotiation list.

=== Edmonton Eskimos ===
One day before the 2015 CFL draft, the Riders traded Watson to the Edmonton Eskimos. In return, the Riders received national long-snapper Jorgen Hus and a second-round selection in the 2016 CFL draft. Watson contributed 42 receptions for 319 yards with three touchdowns during the Eskimos 103rd Grey Cup winning season. Following the season, Watson was re-signed by the Eskimos throughout the 2017 CFL season. Over three seasons with the Eskimos, he played in 48 games, recording 112 receptions for 1,114 receiving yards and seven touchdowns.

=== BC Lions ===
Upon entering free agency, Watson signed with the BC Lions on February 14, 2018, reuniting him with former Eskimos general manager, Ed Hervey. Watson played in 18 games for the Lions in 2018, catching 38 passes for 406 yards with three touchdowns.

=== Saskatchewan Roughriders (II) ===
Watson returned to Saskatchewan for the 2019 season, and contributed with 46 receptions for 401 yards with one touchdown.

== Coaching career ==
On April 27, 2022, it was announced that Watson had joined his alma mater Concordia as a wide receivers coach.
