= Brian Ridgeway =

Canadian gridiron football player (born 1984)

No. 44
- Position: Linebacker

Personal information
- Born: April 26, 1984 (age 42); Grande Prairie, Alberta, Canada
- Listed height: 6 ft 2 in (1.88 m)
- Listed weight: 222 lb (101 kg)

Career information
- University: Simon Fraser; Saint Mary's
- CFL draft: 2010: 5th round, 39th overall pick

Career history
- 2011–2013: Montreal Alouettes
- Stats at CFL.ca (archive)

Brian Ridgeway (born April 26, 1984) is a Canadian former professional football linebacker who played for the Montreal Alouettes of the Canadian Football League (CFL). He was selected 39th overall by the Alouettes in the 2010 CFL draft. He originally played CIS Football with the Simon Fraser Clan, but due to that school's program joining NCAA Division II, he played his final year of CIS eligibility with the Saint Mary's Huskies.
