= Justin Conn =

Canadian football player (born 1988)

No. 42, 48
- Position: Linebacker

Personal information
- Born: August 29, 1988 (age 38); Fredericton, New Brunswick, Canada
- Listed height: 6 ft 3 in (1.91 m)
- Listed weight: 230 lb (104 kg)

Career information
- University: Bishop's
- CFL draft: 2010: 6th round, 47th overall pick

Career history
- 2010–2011: Montreal Alouettes
- 2011: Calgary Stampeders
- 2012: BC Lions

Awards and highlights
- Grey Cup champion (2010)
- Stats at CFL.ca

Justin Conn (born August 29, 1988) is a Canadian former professional football linebacker. He was drafted 47th overall by the Montreal Alouettes in the 2010 CFL draft. He played CIS football for the Bishop's Gaiters.
