= Newtonbrook Secondary School =

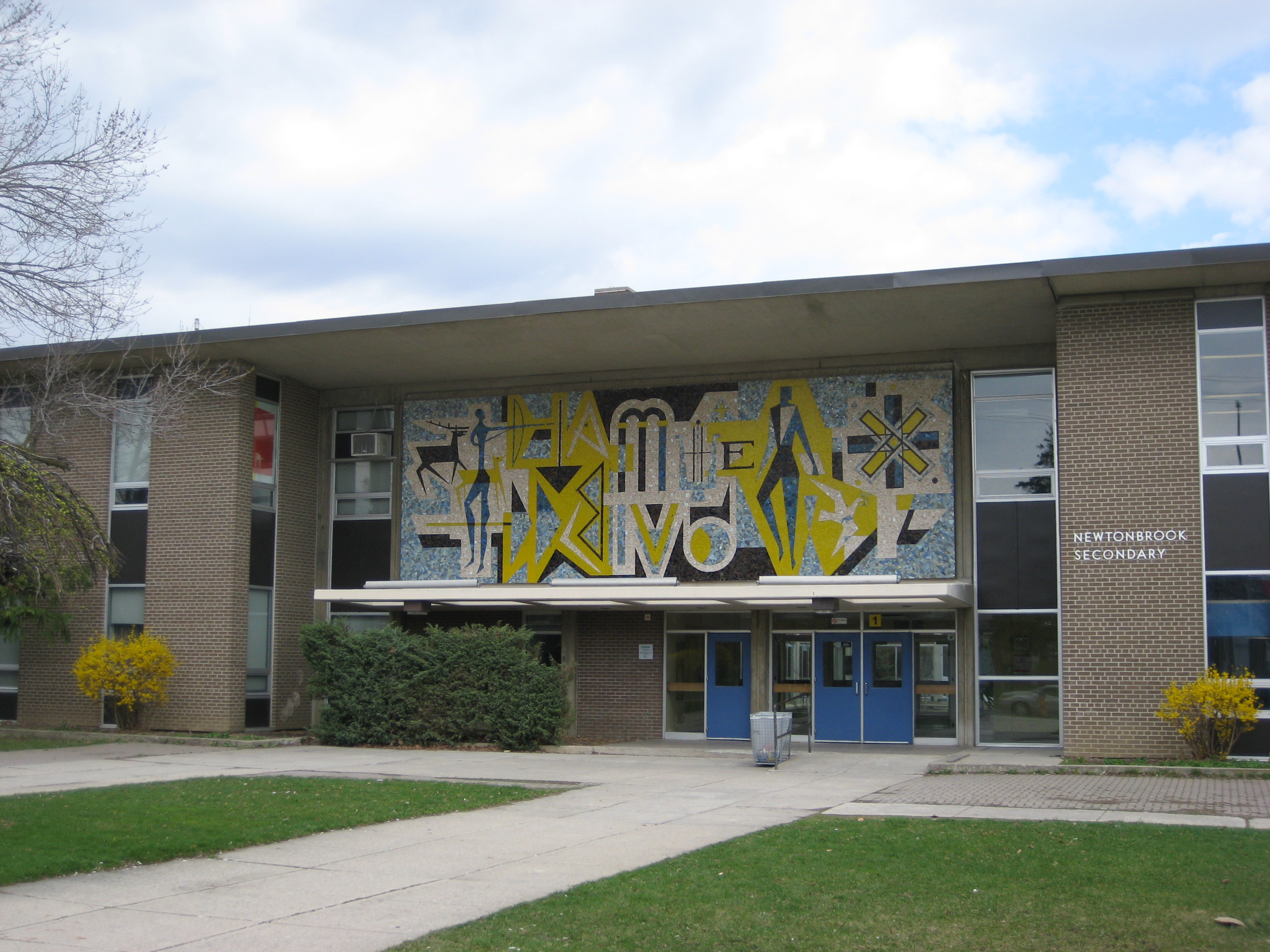

Location
- 155 Hilda Avenue; Toronto, Ontario, M2M 1V6; Canada; 43.7935°N 79.4265°W

Information
- School type: Public, High School
- Motto: Quisque Pro Ingenio (To each according to his/her own talent)
- Founded: 1964
- School board: Toronto District School Board
- Superintendent: Marwa Hamid
- Area trustee: Weidong Pei
- School number: 3442 / 928810
- Principal: Saverio Zupo
- Grades: 9 - 12
- Enrolment: 861 (2019-20)
- Language: English and French
- Area: Yonge Street and Steeles Ave, North York
- Colours: Scarlet & Grey
- Mascot: Polaris the Polar Bear
- Team name: Newtonbrook Northmen/Vikings (1964-1995); Newtonbrook North Stars (1995-present)
- Website: schoolweb.tdsb.on.ca/newtonbrook

Newtonbrook Secondary School is a high school for Grades 9 to 12 in the Newtonbrook neighborhood in Toronto, Ontario, Canada.

== History ==
Opened in 1964 by the then North York Board of Education to provide a closer school for the area (formerly served by Earl Haig Secondary School to the south) with 610 pupils. It was officially opened in Winter 1965 by Newtonbrook-born and then Prime Minister of Canada Lester B. Pearson.

The building's design resembled Sir Sanford Fleming Academy but alterations occurred years later.

It is considered to be one of the more sports-oriented high schools in the Toronto District School Board. Some of the athletics offered are: rugby, basketball, soccer, track, ultimate, volleyball, baseball, softball, cheerleading, dance team, water polo, cross country running, swimming, badminton and most importantly, wrestling. Newtonbrook has one of the oldest wrestling teams among Toronto high school. Newtonbrook's football program was coached by then-city councillor and future mayor Rob Ford until 2001 when he confronted a student.

Some elective academic programmes offered are: French immersion, fashion design, dance, music and a thorough computer science program.

The sports field is used by the Toronto City Saints rugby team of the Canada Rugby League.

== Notable alumni ==
- J'Michael Deane CFL Player Ottawa Red Blacks, Former Calgary Stampeder, Graduate Michigan State University
- Elizabeth Cull, Minister of Health (1991+); Minister of Finance (1993–95), British Columbia, Canada.
- Lisa Feldman Barrett, University Distinguished Professor of Psychology, Northeastern University
- Mark Bluvshtein, Russian-born Canadian chess grandmaster
- Shane Kippel, Canadian television actor
- Geddy Lee, born Gary Lee Weinrib, singer (Rush)
- Mark Napier, retired NHL Player (Minnesota North Stars, Montreal Canadiens, Edmonton Oilers and Buffalo Sabres); former head coach for the Toronto St. Michael's Majors
- Steve Shutt, retired NHL player Montreal Canadiens and Los Angeles Kings
- Shawn Gore, former NFL player, Green Bay Packers and CFL player B.C. Lions
- Michael Wex (né Weczs), Yiddish-language scholar and theorist, best selling North American humorist
- Boris Cherniak, Comedian, Hypnotist, and Author

== See also ==
- Education in Ontario
- List of secondary schools in Ontario
