= Shomari Williams =

Canadian football coach and recruiter (born 1985)

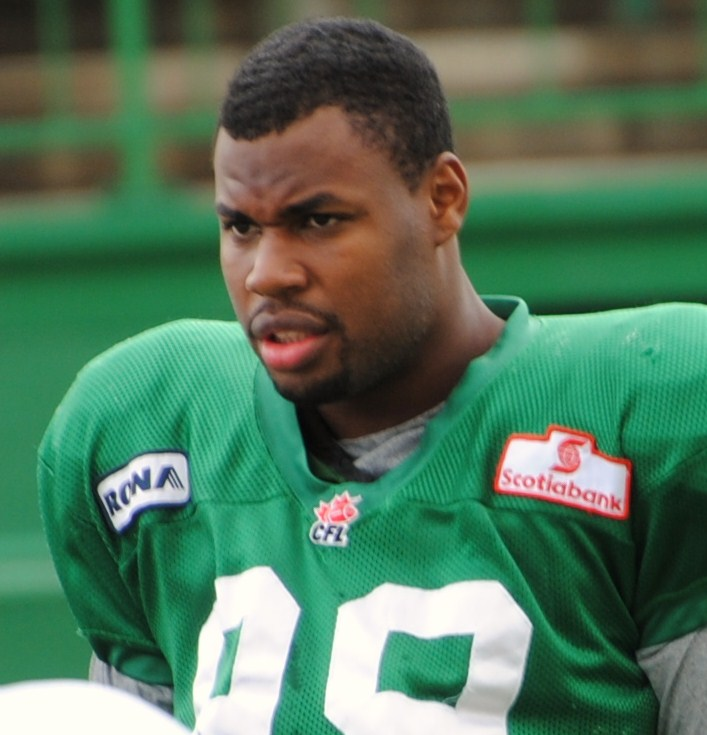
- Williams with the Saskatchewan Roughriders in 2010

UBC Thunderbirds
- Title: Defensive line coach

Personal information
- Born: March 8, 1985 (age 41); Toronto, Ontario, Canada
- Listed height: 6 ft 1 in (1.85 m)
- Listed weight: 232 lb (105 kg)

Career information
- Position: Defensive lineman
- University: Queen's
- CFL draft: 2010: 1st round, 1st overall pick

Career history

Playing
- 2010–2012: Saskatchewan Roughriders
- 2013: Hamilton Tiger-Cats
- 2014: Saskatchewan Roughriders
- 2015: Calgary Stampeders*
- 2015: Edmonton Eskimos*
- * Offseason or practice squad member only

Coaching
- 2018: Queen's Gaels (AC)
- 2019–present: UBC Thunderbirds (DLC)

Awards and highlights
- 2009 Vanier Cup champion; MVP of 2009 Mitchell Bowl
- Stats at CFL.ca (archive)

Shomari Gyasi Williams (born March 8, 1985) is the defensive line coach and recruiting coordinator for the UBC Thunderbirds of U Sports football. He is a former professional Canadian football defensive end who played in parts of six seasons in the Canadian Football League (CFL). He was drafted first overall by the Saskatchewan Roughriders in the 2010 CFL draft after Saskatchewan traded up to be in a position to draft him. Williams played one season with the Hamilton Tiger-Cats before being traded back to Saskatchewan. He played college football for the Queen's Golden Gaels and the Houston Cougars.

Off the field Williams owns and operates two companies designed at helping high school student athletes get exposure and opportunities to receive athletic scholarships. Student Blitz is a company he founded while still at the University of Houston and used it to help several players still in Canada receive NCAA scholarships. Top Prospects is his Canadian company which now is home to Canada's largest database of high school football players.

== Amateur career ==
=== High school ===
Williams first attended North Park Secondary School in Brampton, Ontario where he played football for the North Park Vikings. He then attended Champlain Regional Prep in Lennoxville, Quebec for two years. He was named the team's MVP and also secured a spot on the All-Canadian squad while in high school. During one of his best games in high school, Williams recorded 11 tackles and a forced fumble. While in high school, he was recruited by the University of Houston, University of South Florida, Rutgers, and Connecticut.

=== University ===
At the University of Houston, Williams played mostly on special teams. During his freshman season, he also spent time as a fullback. In his sophomore season, Williams played in all 13 of the club's games, the most action he saw during his time at Houston. During his junior year, he competed in two games. After his junior season, Williams transferred to Queen's University. He had finished his degree in entrepreneurship at the University of Houston, and wanted to further his education in Canada.

Williams played defensive end for the Queen's Golden Gaels. During the regular season he played in six games, recording 32 tackles and four sacks. He was named Queen's University Athlete of the Week twice during the season. In the playoffs, Williams contributed even more, recording 26 tackles and 5.5 sacks in four playoff games. He was named Most Valuable Player at the 2009 Mitchell Bowl, where Queen's defeated the Laval Rouge et Or. Queen's won the 2009 Vanier Cup as Canada's national champions.

== Professional career ==
=== Saskatchewan Roughriders ===
After impressing at the CFL Evaluation Camp, Williams was named the top prospect in the Canadian Football League’s Amateur Scouting Bureau rankings for players eligible in the 2010 CFL draft. On the day prior to the draft, the Toronto Argonauts traded the number one overall draft pick to the Saskatchewan Roughriders, along with the eighth overall pick, for punter Jamie Boreham and the second and fourth overall picks in the 2010 draft. Williams was flown into Regina to be introduced on May 2, 2010 as the number one overall selection in the 2010 CFL Draft. He agreed to a contract with the Roughriders on May 12, 2010. Williams played 3 seasons with the Roughriders. His first two seasons were mostly as a member of the special teams units. In his third season he received significant playing time at the defensive end and linebacker positions, recording 59 tackles and 2 sacks.

=== Hamilton Tiger-Cats ===
On February 15, 2013, the first day of CFL free agency, Williams signed with the Hamilton Tiger-Cats of the CFL. In 2013, Williams missed much of the season with the Tiger-Cats with an injury.

=== Saskatchewan Roughriders (II) ===
On February 17, 2014, Williams was part of a trade that sent him back to the Saskatchewan Roughriders. He played in all 18 regular season games, amassing 17 special teams tackles. He was released on March 2, 2015.

=== Calgary Stampeders ===
On March 10, 2015, Williams signed a contract with the Calgary Stampeders of the CFL.

== Coaching career ==
=== Queen's Gaels ===
On July 16, 2018, Williams joined the Queen's Gaels as the team's assistant coach in charge of recruiting. He spent the 2018 U Sports football season with his alma mater.

=== UBC Thunderbirds ===
For the 2019 U Sports football season, Williams joined the UBC Thunderbirds as the team's defensive line coach and recruiting coordinator.
