= Nasser Jamal =

Afghani gridiron football player (born 1988)

Profile
- Position: Offensive lineman

Personal information
- Born: February 25, 1988 (age 38); Kandahar, Afghanistan
- Listed height: 6 ft 6 in (1.98 m)
- Listed weight: 290 lb (132 kg)

Career information
- High school: New Westminster (British Columbia, Canada)
- College: Louisiana at Lafayette
- CFL draft: 2010: 6th round, 40th overall pick

Career history
- 2011: Toronto Argonauts*
- * Offseason or practice squad member only
- Stats at CFL.ca (archive)

Nasser Jamal (born February 25, 1988, in Kandahar, Afghanistan) is a former professional Canadian football offensive lineman. He was a member of the Toronto Argonauts of the Canadian Football League (CFL). He was drafted 40th overall by the Argonauts in the 2009 CFL draft and signed with the team on April 4, 2011, taking time off to complete his degree. He was ranked as a top 5 draft pick, but fell in rankings due to injury. He was later released on July 20, 2011, due to injuries sustained during practice. He played NCAA Division 1A college football for the Louisiana–Lafayette Ragin' Cajuns where he was a 3-year letter winner and recipient of multiple academic awards.

Jamal speaks English and Pashto.
