= Adam Baboulas =

Canadian football player (born 1987)

Profile
- Position: Offensive lineman

Personal information
- Born: April 5, 1987 (age 39); Oshawa, Ontario, Canada
- Listed height: 6 ft 4 in (1.93 m)
- Listed weight: 300 lb (136 kg)

Career information
- University: Saint Mary's
- CFL draft: 2010: 6th round, 41st overall pick

Career history
- 2010–2013: BC Lions
- 2014: Edmonton Eskimos
- Stats at CFL.ca (archive)

Adam Baboulas (born April 5, 1987) is a Canadian former professional football offensive lineman who played in the Canadian Football League (CFL). He was selected 41st overall by the BC Lions in the 2010 CFL draft, and signed a contract with the team on May 25, 2010. He played college football for the Saint Mary's Huskies.
