= Danny Watkins =

Canadian gridiron football player (born 1984)

No. 63, 62
- Position: Offensive guard

Personal information
- Born: November 6, 1984 (age 42); Kelowna, British Columbia, Canada
- Listed height: 6 ft 3 in (1.91 m)
- Listed weight: 310 lb (141 kg)

Career information
- High school: Mt. Boucherie (West Kelowna, British Columbia)
- College: Butte (2007–2008); Baylor (2009–2010)
- NFL draft: 2011: 1st round, 23rd overall pick
- CFL draft: 2010: 1st round, 4th overall pick

Career history
- Philadelphia Eagles (2011–2012); Miami Dolphins (2013)

Awards and highlights
- PFWA All-Rookie Team (2011); First-team All-Big 12 (2010)

Career NFL statistics
- Games played: 24
- Games started: 18
- Fumble recoveries: 1
- Stats at Pro Football Reference

Danny William Watkins (born November 6, 1984) is a Canadian former professional football player who was an offensive guard in the National Football League (NFL).

== Early life ==
Watkins' father, Todd, is a road grader. In high school, Watkins played rugby and hockey as a defenseman, but became the "designated goon" because of his size. He became a junior firefighter when he was 16 after visiting the West Kelowna Fire and Rescue squad.

== College career ==
=== Butte College ===
Watkins enrolled at Butte College to study fire sciences in order to become a firefighter after a year as a junior firefighter. The school's football coach recruited him to play for their football team, at the age of 22 it was the first time Watkins had ever played football. He played football at Butte from 2007−2008, helping them to a perfect 11−0 record in 2008. Butte coaches sent game tape to FBS schools, and California, Hawaii, and Baylor expressed interest.

=== Baylor University ===
Watkins transferred to Baylor University, after head coach Art Briles was impressed with his game tape at Butte. Watkins started at left offensive tackle as a junior in 2009 for the Bears. He replaced Jason Smith, who was drafted second overall by the St. Louis Rams in the 2009 NFL draft.

He was selected fourth overall by the BC Lions of the Canadian Football League in the 2010 CFL draft, but played out his last year at Baylor University, the 2010 season.

== Professional career ==
=== Pre-draft ===
Prior to the 2011 NFL draft, Watkins was projected to be drafted in the first or second round. He hired former NFL offensive lineman Joe Panos as his agent.

Pre-draft measurables
Height	Weight	Arm length	Hand span	Wingspan	40-yard dash	10-yard split	20-yard split	20-yard shuttle	Three-cone drill	Vertical jump	Broad jump	Bench press
6 ft 3 3/8 in (1.91 m)	310 lb (141 kg)	34 1/4 in (0.87 m)	10 1/8 in (0.26 m)	6 ft 9 5/8 in (2.07 m)	5.40 s	1.89 s	3.11 s	4.62 s	7.61 s	26.0 in (0.66 m)	7 ft 8 in (2.34 m)	29 reps
All values from 2011 NFL Scouting Combine

Watkins invited five of his friends from the West Kelowna fire department to join him at the draft. On the morning of the draft, Watkins and his firefighter friends visited a New York City firehouse that lost several members during the September 11 attacks.

=== Philadelphia Eagles ===
Watkins was selected in the first round with the 23rd overall pick by the Philadelphia Eagles in the 2011 NFL draft. He became the oldest first-round selection since 1971 at the age of 26. He was the first Canadian to be drafted in the first rounds of both the CFL and NFL drafts since Mike Schad in 1986. He was projected to start as a rookie at right offensive guard and signed a four-year contract worth $7.9 million on August 1. However, the Eagles claimed Kyle DeVan off waivers from the Indianapolis Colts before the start of the season and Watkins was benched. Watkins was inactive for the first two weeks of the season and was active for a week three game against the New York Giants, but did not play. He was inactive again in week four, but was promoted to the starting right guard on October 5, due to the ineffectiveness of DeVan through the first four games of the season. Watkins was released on August 31, 2013. Eagles general manager Howie Roseman said the "innate toughness" Watkins showed at Baylor never showed up in the NFL.

=== Miami Dolphins ===
The Miami Dolphins signed Watkins to a one-year contract on September 3, 2013, after waiving backup lineman Josh Samuda.

=== Retirement ===
In 2014, it was reported that Watkins had left the NFL and was a firefighter in Frisco, Texas.
