= Michael Warner (Canadian football) =

Profile
- Position: Offensive lineman

Personal information
- Listed height: 6 ft 1 in (1.85 m)
- Listed weight: 293 lb (133 kg)

Career information
- University: Waterloo
- CFL draft: 2010: 5th round, 32nd overall pick

Career history
- 2010: Toronto Argonauts*
- 2011: Toronto Argonauts*
- * Offseason or practice squad member only
- Stats at CFL.ca

Michael Warner is a professional Canadian football offensive lineman in the Canadian Football League. He was drafted 32nd overall by the Toronto Argonauts in the 2010 CFL draft and signed with the team on May 25, 2010. On June 20, 2010, Warner was released by the Argonauts. He played CIS football for the Waterloo Warriors.

On December 7, 2010, Warner was re-signed by the Argonauts. He was released by the Argonauts on June 8, 2011.
