= Karl McCartney (gridiron football) =

Canadian football player (born 1987)

Profile
- Position: Linebacker

Personal information
- Born: November 29, 1987 (age 38); Nassau, Bahamas
- Listed height: 6 ft 0 in (1.83 m)
- Listed weight: 230 lb (104 kg)

Career information
- University: Saint Mary's
- CFL draft: 2010: 5th round, 37th overall pick

Career history
- 2010–2015: Calgary Stampeders

Awards and highlights
- Grey Cup champion (2014)
- Stats at CFL.ca (archive)

Karl McCartney (born November 29, 1987) is a former professional Canadian football linebacker. He was drafted 37th overall by the Stampeders in the 2010 CFL draft and signed a contract with the team on May 20, 2010. He played college football for the Saint Mary's Huskies.
