= Nate Binder =

Canadian football player (born 1985)

No. 82
- Position: Wide receiver

Personal information
- Born: September 28, 1985 (age 41); Windsor, Ontario, Canada
- Listed height: 6 ft 2 in (1.88 m)
- Listed weight: 200 lb (91 kg)

Career information
- High school: Essex District
- University: Tusculum
- CFL draft: 2010: 4th round, 24th overall pick

Career history
- 2010: BC Lions*
- 2010–2011: Edmonton Eskimos
- * Offseason or practice squad member only
- Stats at CFL.ca (archive)

Nate Binder (born September 28, 1985) is a Canadian former professional football wide receiver. He was drafted 24th overall by the Lions in the 2010 CFL draft and signed a contract with the team on May 25, 2010. He played college football for the Tusculum Pioneers. Binder also played for the Edmonton Eskimos.
