= J'Michael Deane =

American gridiron football player (born 1987)

No. 61
- Position: Offensive lineman

Personal information
- Born: May 4, 1986 (age 40); Hinton, Alberta, Canada
- Listed height: 6 ft 5 in (1.96 m)
- Listed weight: 320 lb (145 kg)

Career information
- High school: Newtonbrook
- College: Michigan State
- CFL draft: 2010: 3rd round, 21st overall pick

Career history
- 2011–2013: Calgary Stampeders
- 2014–2016: Ottawa Redblacks
- 2017–2018: Toronto Argonauts
- 2019: Edmonton Eskimos

Awards and highlights
- 2× Grey Cup champion (2016, 2017)
- Stats at CFL.ca

J'Michael Deane (born May 4, 1986) is a Canadian former professional football offensive lineman who played in the Canadian Football League (CFL). He was drafted 21st overall by the Calgary Stampeders in the 2010 CFL draft and signed a contract with the team on May 10, 2011, after finishing his college eligibility. He played for three years with the Stampeders before being selected in the 2013 CFL Expansion Draft by the Ottawa Redblacks. He won his first Grey Cup championship in 2016. He played college football for the Michigan State Spartans.
