= Matthew Chapdelaine =

Canadian football player

Profile
- Position: Wide receiver

Personal information
- Born: July 28, 1988 (age 38); Burlington, Ontario, Canada
- Listed height: 6 ft 2 in (1.88 m)
- Listed weight: 205 lb (93 kg)

Career information
- University: Alberta; Simon Fraser
- CFL draft: 2010: 6th round, 42nd overall pick

Career history
- 2010: BC Lions*
- * Offseason or practice squad member only
- Stats at CFL.ca (archive)

Matthew Chapdelaine (born July 28, 1988) is a Canadian former football wide receiver. He was drafted 42nd overall by the BC Lions in the 2010 CFL draft and signed a contract with the team on May 25, 2010. He played college football for the Alberta Golden Bears before transferring to Simon Fraser University. Chapdelaine suffered a stress fracture in his foot prior to the 2009 season and never played for the Simon Fraser Clan.
