= Shawn Gore =

Canadian gridiron football player (born 1987)

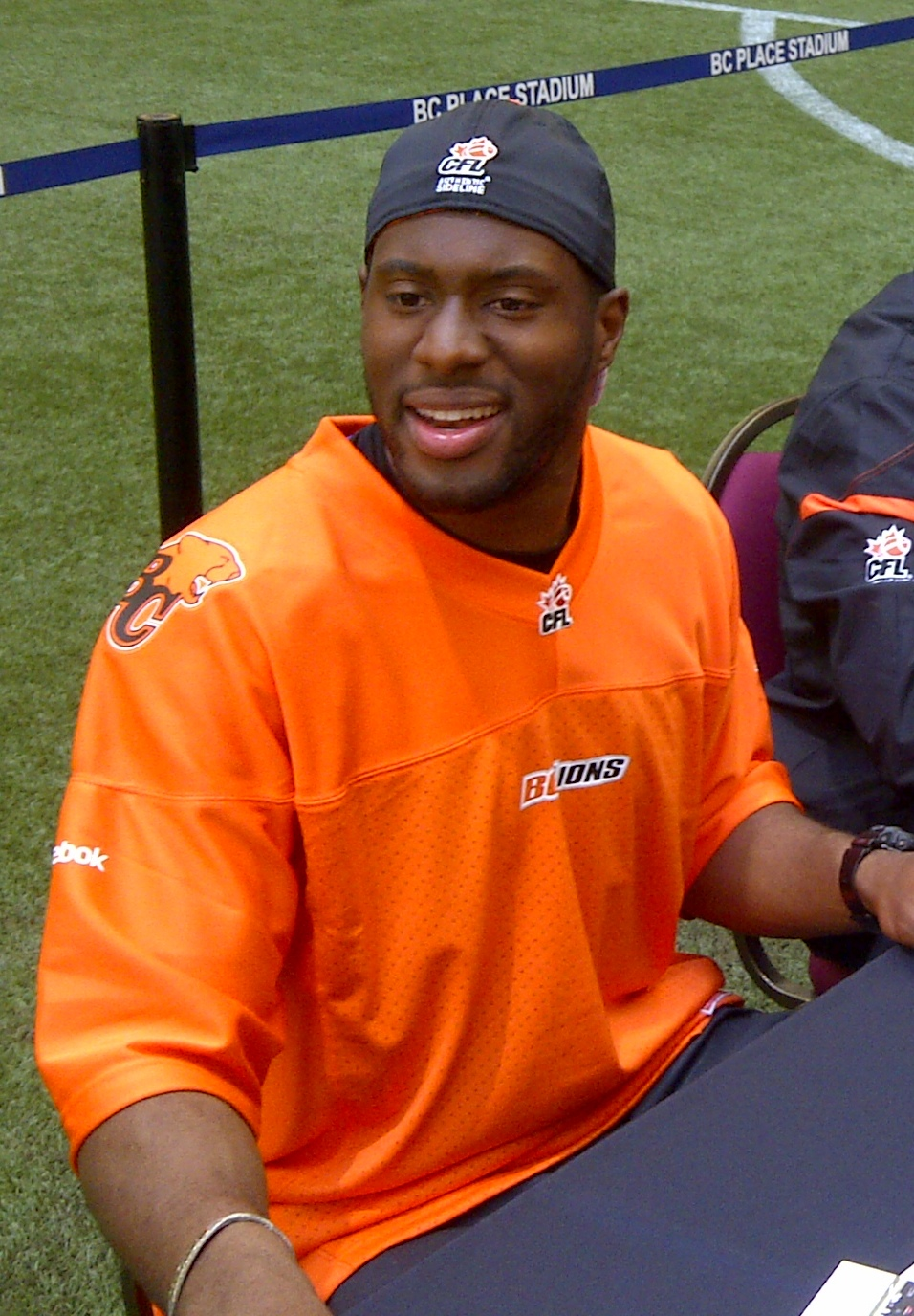
- Gore in 2012

No. 85
- Position: Wide receiver

Personal information
- Born: April 12, 1987 (age 39); Toronto, Ontario, Canada
- Listed height: 6 ft 0 in (1.83 m)
- Listed weight: 200 lb (91 kg)

Career information
- University: Bishop's
- CFL draft: 2010: 2nd round, 10th overall pick

Career history
- 2010: Green Bay Packers*
- 2010–2016: BC Lions
- * Offseason or practice squad member only

Awards and highlights
- Grey Cup champion (2011); Gibson's Finest CFL Canadian Player of the Week against Edmonton Eskimos week 12 (2012)
- Stats at CFL.ca

Shawn Vere Gore (born April 12, 1987), is a retired professional Canadian football wide receiver. Gore spent the majority of his professional career playing for the BC Lions of the Canadian Football League. He was drafted tenth overall by the Lions in the 2010 CFL draft, but signed with the Green Bay Packers of the National Football League on the day after the draft as a free agent. He played college football for the Bishop's Gaiters, and high school football for the Newtonbrook North Stars.

== Professional career ==
=== Green Bay Packers ===
Gore was released from the Packers on August 28, 2010 without ever playing an NFL regular season game.

=== BC Lions ===
Soon after, on September 5, 2010, it was announced that Gore had signed with the BC Lions. After a strong performance in the Lions' 2011 training camp, Gore earned a starting position on offence as a receiver.

On January 13, 2013, after trying out for three NFL teams it was announced that Gore decided to re-sign with the Lions under a three-year deal. On May 4, 2017, at the age of 30, Gore announced his retirement from professional football on the same day he was sworn in as a member of the Vancouver Police Department. He finished his CFL career having played for six seasons, accumulating 307 receptions for 3,911 yards and 20 touchdowns over 113 games.
