= Rob Maver =

Canadian football player (born 1986)

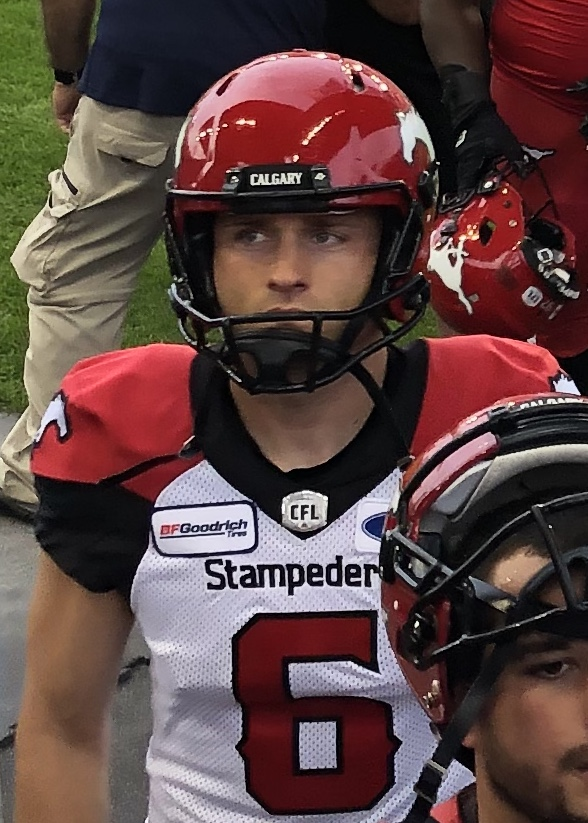
- Maver with the Calgary Stampeders in 2019

No. 6
- Positions: Punter, Kicker

Personal information
- Born: March 12, 1986 (age 40); Brampton, Ontario, Canada
- Listed height: 6 ft 0 in (1.83 m)
- Listed weight: 195 lb (88 kg)

Career information
- High school: Turner Fenton
- University: Guelph
- CFL draft: 2010: 1st round, 5th overall pick

Career history
- 2010–2019: Calgary Stampeders

Awards and highlights
- 2× Grey Cup champion (2014) (2018); Dave Dryburgh Memorial Trophy (2010); Tom Pate Memorial Award (2019); 2× CFL All-Star (2012, 2013); 3× CFL West All-Star (2012, 2013, 2014)
- Stats at CFL.ca

Rob Maver (born March 12, 1986) is a Canadian former professional football punter who played his entire 10-year career with the Calgary Stampeders of the Canadian Football League (CFL). He was drafted fifth overall by the Stampeders in the 2010 CFL draft, after being highly ranked by the CFL's Amateur Scouting Bureau. He played CIS football for the Guelph Gryphons. He played high school football for Turner Fenton Trojans.

== University career ==
Maver attended University of Guelph where he played university football for the Guelph Gryphons as the team's placekicker and punter from 2006-2009. He earned OUA All-star honours for both positions for the 2009 season. Maver also played in the 2009 CIS East-West game and finished in eighth place on the CIS all-time field goals list with 54.

== Professional career ==
After his university career, Maver was the only placekicker invited to the CFL Evaluation Camp (Grant Shaw was invited as a defensive back). Maver was the sixth ranked player in the Canadian Football League’s Amateur Scouting Bureau rankings for players eligible in the 2010 CFL draft. With their kickers departing their teams after the 2009 CFL season, the Calgary Stampeders, Hamilton Tiger-Cats, and Toronto Argonauts were said to be looking for a replacement kicker, possibly found in the draft. As such, the Calgary Stampeders had to use their early draft pick to select Maver fifth overall before the other two teams could do so.

On May 13, 2010, it was announced that Maver had signed a contract with the Calgary Stampeders.
