= Steven Turner =

Canadian football player (born 1987)

Profile
- Positions: Running back, Slotback

Personal information
- Born: January 18, 1987 (age 39); Brampton, Ontario, Canada
- Listed height: 5 ft 8 in (1.73 m)
- Listed weight: 176 lb (80 kg)

Career information
- University: Bishop's
- CFL draft: 2010: 4th round, 30th overall pick

Career history
- 2010–2011: Toronto Argonauts*
- 2012: Edmonton Eskimos*
- * Offseason or practice squad member only
- Stats at CFL.ca

Steven "Afterburner" Turner (born January 18, 1987) is a Canadian former professional football running back and slotback. He was drafted 30th overall by the Toronto Argonauts in the 2010 CFL draft. He played college football for the Bishop's Gaiters.

== College career ==
Turner attended Bishop's University where he played college football for the Bishop's Gaiters from 2006 to 2009 under former Toronto Argonaut Leroy Blugh.

== Professional career ==
Turner turned heads at the CFL Evaluation Camp after he broke the E-Camp record of 4.39 seconds for the 40-yard dash by recording his own mark of 4.31 seconds. The previous record had been set by former teammate Jamall Lee at the previous year's E-Camp. Turner finished in first or at least tied for first in the 40-yard dash, the shuttle, the vertical leap and the standing broad leap After his impressive performance at the E-Camp, he was ranked as the 14th best player available in the 2010 CFL draft in the Canadian Football League’s Amateur Scouting Bureau rankings. On May 2, 2010, Turner was selected with the 30th overall pick by the Toronto Argonauts in the 2010 CFL draft.

Turner signed through the 2012 season with the Argonauts on May 21, 2010. On June 7, 2010, he ruptured his left Achilles tendon during training camp, leaving his 2010 CFL season debut in doubt. On June 24, 2010, Turner was released by the Argonauts. On December 7, 2010, Turner was re-signed by the Argonauts. He was released by the Argonauts on June 8, 2011.

Turner was signed to the practice roster of the Edmonton Eskimos on October 15, 2012. He was released on May 8, 2013.
