= Saleem Borhot =

Canadian football player (born 1985)

No. 23
- Position: Defensive back

Personal information
- Born: June 28, 1985 (age 41); Calgary, Alberta
- Listed height: 6 ft 2.5 in (1.89 m)
- Listed weight: 205 lb (93 kg)

Career information
- High school: Henry Wisewood
- CJFL: Okanagan Sun
- University: Saint Mary's
- CFL draft: 2010: 2nd round, 12th overall pick

Career history
- 2010: Edmonton Eskimos
- 2011: Calgary Stampeders*
- * Offseason or practice squad member only
- Stats at CFL.ca (archive)

Saleem Borhot (born June 28, 1985) is a Canadian former professional football defensive back.He last played for the Calgary Stampeders of the Canadian Football League. He was drafted twelfth overall by the Edmonton Eskimos in the 2010 CFL draft and signed a three-year contract plus an option year with the team on May 14, 2010. He played university football for the Saint Mary's Huskies.
