= Akeem Foster =

Canadian gridiron football player (born 1987)

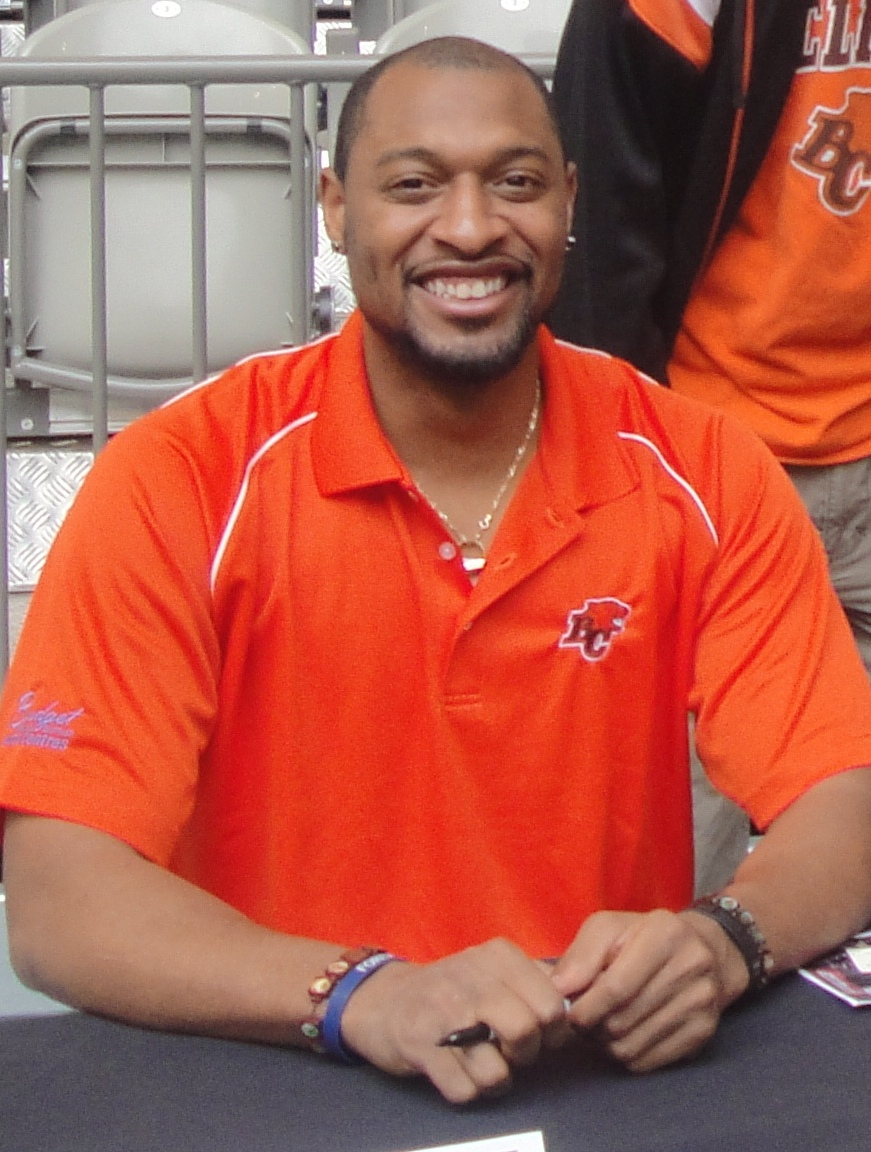
- Foster in 2012

No. 8, 88
- Position: Wide receiver

Personal information
- Born: March 20, 1987 (age 39); Ajax, Ontario, Canada
- Listed height: 6 ft 4 in (1.93 m)
- Listed weight: 220 lb (100 kg)

Career information
- High school: Notre Dame C.S.S. (Ajax, ON)
- University: St. Francis Xavier
- CFL draft: 2010: 4th round, 25th overall pick

Career history
- 2010–2013: BC Lions
- 2013: Winnipeg Blue Bombers
- 2014: Edmonton Eskimos
- 2016: Tri-Cities Fever
- 2017: Nebraska Danger

Awards and highlights
- Grey Cup champion (2011)
- Stats at CFL.ca (archive)

Akeem Foster (born March 20, 1987) is a Canadian former professional football wide receiver who played in the Canadian Football League (CFL). He was drafted 25th overall by the BC Lions in the 2010 CFL draft and signed a contract with the team on May 25, 2010. During the 2013 CFL season, the Lions traded him in exchange for Buck Pierce. He played college football for the St. Francis Xavier X-Men. Foster played for the Tri-Cities Fever of the Indoor Football League in 2016. Foster also played for the Kotka Eagles of the Finnish 1st Division.
