= Taurean Allen =

Canadian football player (born 1987)

Profile
- Position: Defensive back

Personal information
- Born: February 15, 1987 (age 39); Etobicoke, Ontario, Canada
- Listed height: 5 ft 11 in (1.80 m)
- Listed weight: 195 lb (88 kg)

Career information
- High school: Applewood Heights
- University: Wilfrid Laurier
- CFL draft: 2010: 2nd round, 13th overall pick

Career history
- 2010–2011: Calgary Stampeders

Taurean Allen (born February 15, 1987) is a Canadian former professional football defensive back who played for the Calgary Stampeders of the Canadian Football League (CFL). The Stampeders selected Allen in the second round of the 2010 CFL draft. He played college football for the Wilfrid Laurier Golden Hawks. In 2010, Allen played in six regular season games for the Stampeders, recording seven tackles. He did not play in the 2011 season due to injury and was released shortly thereafter.

== Early career ==
Allen played college football at Wilfrid Laurier University as a cornerback. As a freshman player in 2007, Allen led the secondary unit with seven knockdowns along with two interceptions. He was named a first-team Ontario University Athletics (OUA) All-Star and a second-team All-Canadian. Allen was again named to the OUA All-Star first team in 2008 and 2009. He studied communications while at Wilfrid Laurier. He also played at the CIS East West Bowl in his final year with the Golden Hawks after recording 16.5 tackles, two pass deflections, and an interception in 2009.

== Professional career ==
In September and December 2009, the CFL Scouting Bureau ranked Allen thirteenth on the list of top draft prospects for the 2010 CFL draft. Allen saw his ranking increase to eighth place after being invited to the CFL evaluation camp at the University of Toronto. Going into the draft, Allen was reported to be the fastest cornerback available for selection. The Calgary Stampeders selected Allen in the second round of the 2010 CFL draft with the 13th overall pick. After drafting Allen, Stampeders head coach and general manager John Hufnagel stated that Allen could play at cornerback, but the team would attempt to transition him to safety. Allen signed with the Stampeders on May 17, 2010 and spent time during the offseason training with several of his new teammates in Chattanooga, Tennessee.

In training camp, Allen competed with Wes Lysack and Eric Fraser for the starting safety position. Lysack and Fraser were considered to be stronger players than Allen physically, but Allen was both quicker and possessed greater ability in coverage. Allen started the first preseason game at safety but also spent significant time on the field as a cornerback, his previous position. After making the regular season roster, Allen spent the month of July moving on and off the roster but playing in no games. Allen made his CFL debut on July 31, 2010 in a 23–20 win against the Winnipeg Blue Bombers, in which he played off the bench. He continued to spend most of his time on the inactive list or the practice squad throughout the season, playing sporadically. Allen also missed playing time due to a leg injury. He finished the season with seven tackles in six games. Allen's contributions were largely on special teams, where he performed five of his tackles. He played in the West Final against the Saskatchewan Roughriders.

Starting safety Lysack was released from the Stampeders during the offseason, and several players competed alongside Allen for the starting role in training camp, including Eric Fraser, Milt Collins, Mark Holden, and Saleem Borhot. Allen's preseason was cut short by an injury that affected his hip, groin, and leg, causing the Stampeders to place him on the nine-game injured list before the season opener. He ultimately did not play in the 2011 season. The Stampeders released Allen during the offseason. The Leader-Post's Allen Cameron cited his injuries as the primary cause of his relatively quiet and brief career in the CFL, saying they "slowed his development and sapped his confidence".

== Later life ==
After his professional career, Allen went on to work for Aerotek as a technical recruiter and account manager.
