= Evan McCollough =

American gridiron football player (born 1987)

No. 24
- Position: Defensive back

Personal information
- Born: September 2, 1987 (age 39); Glenarden, Maryland, U.S.
- Listed height: 5 ft 11 in (1.80 m)
- Listed weight: 196 lb (89 kg)

Career information
- College: James Madison
- NFL draft: 2009: undrafted

Career history
- 2009: Tampa Bay Buccaneers*
- 2010–2012: Toronto Argonauts
- 2013–2014: Hamilton Tiger-Cats
- 2014: Toronto Argonauts
- * Offseason or practice squad member only

Awards and highlights
- Grey Cup champion (2012)
- Stats at CFL.ca (archive)

Evan McCollough (born September 2, 1987) is an American former professional football defensive back who played in the Canadian Football League (CFL).

== College career ==
McCollough played college football for the James Madison Dukes.

== Professional career ==
=== Toronto Argonauts ===
On May 28, 2010, McCollough signed as a free agent with the Toronto Argonauts. McCollough was a member of the 100th Grey Cup winning team.

=== Hamilton Tiger-Cats ===
On February 15, 2013, McCollough signed with the Hamilton Tiger-Cats. He was released by the Tiger-Cats on June 21, 2014.

=== Toronto Argonauts ===
McCollough was signed to the Toronto Argonauts' practice roster on August 30, 2014.
