= 2010 CFL draft =

Canadian football draft

2010 CFL Draft

General information
- Sport: Canadian football
- Date: May 2
- Time: 12:00 PM ET
- Location: Toronto
- Network: TSN

Overview
- 47 total selections in 6 rounds
- First selection: Shomari Williams
- Most selections: Toronto Argonauts (9); BC Lions (9)
- Fewest selections: Edmonton Eskimos (4); Hamilton Tiger-Cats (4); Winnipeg Blue Bombers (4); Saskatchewan Roughriders (4)
- CIS selections: 36
- NCAA selections: 11

The 2010 CFL draft took place on Sunday, May 2, 2010, at 12:00 PM ET on TSN. 47 players were chosen from among eligible players from Canadian universities across the country, as well as Canadian players playing in the NCAA. After a number of trades, including ones made on draft day, Toronto and BC wound up with the most picks with nine apiece. The defending Grey Cup champions, the Montreal Alouettes, had seven, while the Calgary Stampeders had six. The Edmonton Eskimos, Hamilton Tiger-Cats, Winnipeg Blue Bombers and the Saskatchewan Roughriders each had four. Of the 47 draft selections, 36 players were drafted from Canadian Interuniversity Sport institutions.

The Saskatchewan Roughriders also had the option to increase their number of draft picks as part of the three-way trade that was completed with Winnipeg and Hamilton in April, 2009. The Roughriders could have either swapped first round picks with Winnipeg in this year's draft or in the 2011 CFL draft, or receive two second round picks in 2011 and 2012. This was done due to the uncertainty of the Stefan LeFors trade where the traded draft pick to Edmonton was conditional upon Lefors' performance. It was then confirmed that the Roughriders had chosen to swap first round picks with the Blue Bombers in this year's draft.

== Top prospects ==
Source: CFL Scouting Bureau final rankings.

Final ranking	December ranking	September ranking	Player	Position	School
1	4	15	Shomari Williams	Linebacker	Queen's
2	1	6	John Bender	Offensive guard	Nevada
3	2	3	Cory Greenwood	Linebacker	Concordia
4	3	2	Danny Watkins	Offensive tackle	Baylor
5	11	4	Joe Eppele	Offensive tackle	Washington State
6	7	12	Rob Maver	Kicker/Punter	Guelph
7	10	1	Brian Bulcke	Defensive lineman	Stanford
8	13	13	Taurean Allen	Defensive back	Wilfrid Laurier
9	12	–	Eddie Steele	Defensive tackle	Manitoba
10	–	–	Shawn Gore	Wide receiver	Bishop's Gaiters
11	–	–	Joel Reinders	Offensive lineman	Waterloo Warriors
12	5	9	J'Michael Deane	Offensive lineman	Michigan State
13	8	8	Joash Gesse	Linebacker	Montreal
14	–	–	Steven Turner	Wide receiver	Bishop's
15	6	14	Cory Watson	Wide receiver	Concordia
–	9	5	Akeem Foster	Wide receiver	St. Francis Xavier
–	14	7	Chima Ihekwoaba	Defensive end	Wilfrid Laurier
–	15	11	Nasser Jamal	Offensive tackle	Louisiana–Lafayette
–	–	10	Chris Rwabukamba	Defensive back	Duke

== Forfeitures ==
- Hamilton forfeited their first round selection after selecting Zac Carlson in the 2009 Supplemental Draft.

== Draft order ==
= CFL Division All-Star	= CFL All-Star	= Hall of Famer

=== Round one ===
Pick #	CFL team	Player	Position	School
1	Saskatchewan Roughriders (via Toronto)	Shomari Williams	LB	Queen's
2	Toronto Argonauts (via Saskatchewan via Winnipeg)	Joe Eppele	OT	Washington State
3	Toronto Argonauts (via BC)	Cory Greenwood	LB	Concordia
4	BC Lions (via Toronto via Saskatchewan via Edmonton)	Danny Watkins	OT	Baylor
–	Hamilton Tiger-Cats	Forfeit Pick		
5	Calgary Stampeders	Rob Maver	K/P	Guelph
6	Edmonton Eskimos (via Winnipeg via Saskatchewan)	Brian Bulcke	DL	Stanford
7	Montreal Alouettes	Kristian Matte	OL	Concordia

=== Round two ===
Pick #	CFL team	Player	Position	School
8	Saskatchewan Roughriders (via Toronto via Saskatchewan via Toronto)	Jordan Sisco	WR	Regina
9	Winnipeg Blue Bombers (via Edmonton via Winnipeg)	Cory Watson	WR	Concordia
10	BC Lions	Shawn Gore	WR	Bishop's
11	Toronto Argonauts (via Edmonton)	Grant Shaw	K	Saskatchewan
12	Edmonton Eskimos (via Hamilton)	Saleem Borhot	DB	Saint Mary's
13	Calgary Stampeders	Taurean Allen	DB	Wilfrid Laurier
14	Montreal Alouettes (via Saskatchewan)	Chima Ihekwoaba	DL	Wilfrid Laurier
15	Montreal Alouettes	Curtis Dublanko	LB	North Dakota

=== Round three ===
Pick #	CFL team	Player	Position	School
16	BC Lions (via Toronto)	Joash Gesse	LB	Montréal
17	Calgary Stampeders (via Winnipeg)	John Bender	OL	Nevada
18	Toronto Argonauts (via BC)	Spencer Watt	WR	Simon Fraser
19	Hamilton Tiger-Cats (via Edmonton)	Samuel Fournier	RB	Laval
20	BC Lions (via Toronto via Hamilton)	Hamid Mahmoudi	DB	Montréal
21	Calgary Stampeders	J'Michael Deane	OL	Michigan State
22	Hamilton Tiger-Cats (via Winnipeg via Edmonton via Toronto via Saskatchewan)	Eddie Steele	DT	Manitoba
23	Montreal Alouettes	Marc-Olivier Brouillette	QB	Montréal

=== Round four ===
Pick #	CFL team	Player	Position	School
24	BC Lions (via Toronto)	Nate Binder	WR	Tusculum College
25	BC Lions (via Toronto via Edmonton via Winnipeg)	Akeem Foster	WR	St. Francis Xavier
26	Toronto Argonauts (via BC)	Joel Reinders	OT	Waterloo
27	Hamilton Tiger-Cats (via Edmonton)	Chris Rwabukamba	DB	Duke
28	Winnipeg Blue Bombers (via Hamilton)	Christopher Smith	LB	Queen's
29	Winnipeg Blue Bombers (via Calgary)	Anthony Woodson	RB	Calgary
30	Toronto Argonauts (via BC via Saskatchewan)	Steven Turner	WR	Bishop's
31	Montreal Alouettes	Ryan Bomben	OL	Guelph

=== Round five ===
Pick #	CFL team	Player	Position	School
32	Toronto Argonauts	Michael Warner	OL	Waterloo
33	Saskatchewan Roughriders (via Winnipeg)	Patrick Neufeld	OL	Saskatchewan
34	BC Lions	Cauchy Muamba	DB	St. Francis Xavier
35	Edmonton Eskimos	Scott Ferguson	OL	St. Cloud State
36	Hamilton Tiger-Cats	Justin Palardy	K/P	Saint Mary's
37	Calgary Stampeders	Karl McCartney	LB	Saint Mary's
38	Saskatchewan Roughriders (via Toronto via Saskatchewan)	Bruno LaPointe	DL	Buffalo
39	Montreal Alouettes	Brian Ridgeway	LB	Simon Fraser

=== Round six ===
Pick #	CFL team	Player	Position	School
40	Toronto Argonauts	Nasser Jamal	OL	Louisiana–Lafayette
41	BC Lions (via Winnipeg)	Adam Baboulas	OL	Saint Mary's
42	BC Lions	Matthew Chapdelaine	WR	Simon Fraser
43	Edmonton Eskimos	Corbin Sharun	DB	St. Francis Xavier
44	Toronto Argonauts (via Hamilton)	Conor Elliott	LB	Western
45	Winnipeg Blue Bombers (via Calgary)	Christopher Greaves	DL	Western
46	Calgary Stampeders (via Winnipeg via Saskatchewan)	Oamo Culbreath	OL	British Columbia
47	Montreal Alouettes	Justin Conn	LB	Bishop's
