= Zac Carlson =

Canadian football player (born 1987)

No. 54
- Position: Offensive lineman

Personal information
- Born: August 8, 1987 (age 39); Winnipeg, Manitoba, Canada
- Listed height: 6 ft 4 in (1.93 m)
- Listed weight: 300 lb (136 kg)

Career information
- High school: San Jacinto (CA)
- College: Weber State
- CFL draft: 2009: Supplemental 1st round

Career history
- 2009: Hamilton Tiger-Cats
- 2010: Calgary Stampeders
- Stats at CFL.ca (archive)

Zac Carlson (born August 8, 1987) is a Canadian former professional football offensive lineman who played for the Calgary Stampeders of the Canadian Football League (CFL). He was drafted by the Hamilton Tiger-Cats in the first round of the 2009 CFL Supplemental Draft, meaning that they would forfeit their first round selection in the 2010 CFL draft. After his release in training camp in 2010, he signed with the Calgary Stampeders on June 25, 2010. He played college football for Weber State.
