= Oamo Culbreath =

Canadian football player (born 1987)

Profile
- Position: Offensive lineman

Personal information
- Born: October 26, 1987 (age 39); Kingston, Ontario, Canada
- Listed height: 6 ft 5 in (1.96 m)
- Listed weight: 317 lb (144 kg)

Career information
- High school: Bayridge
- University: British Columbia
- CFL draft: 2010: 6th round, 46th overall pick

Career history
- 2010–2011: Calgary Stampeders
- Stats at CFL.ca (archive)

Oamo Culbreath (born October 26, 1987) is a Canadian former professional football offensive lineman who played for the Calgary Stampeders of the Canadian Football League (CFL). He was drafted 46th overall by the Stampeders in the 2010 CFL draft and signed a contract with the team on May 27, 2010. He played CIS football for the UBC Thunderbirds.
