= Joash Gesse =

Canadian football player (born 1986)

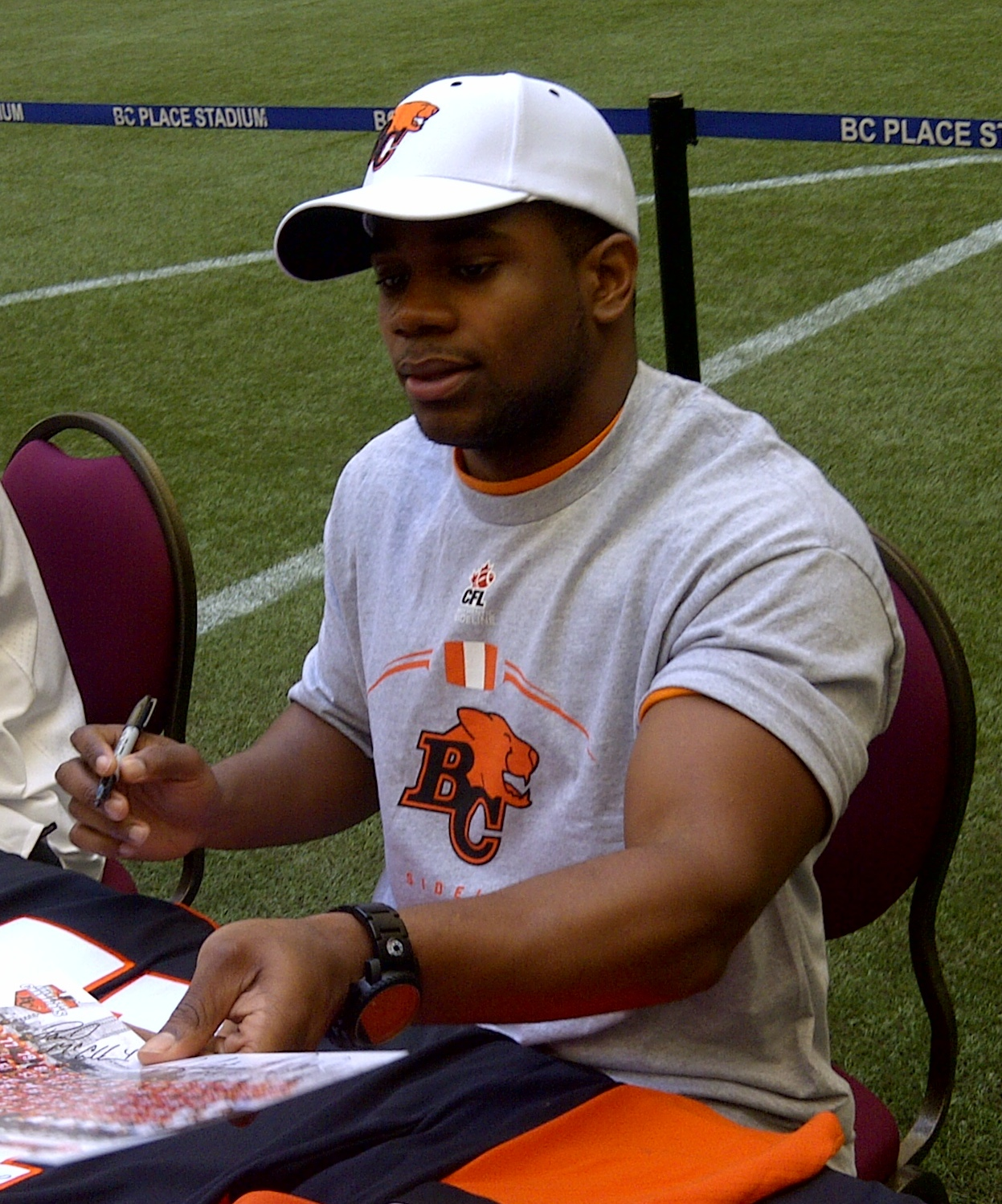
- Gesse with the BC Lions in 2012

No. 51
- Position: Linebacker

Personal information
- Born: September 4, 1986 (age 40); Montreal, Quebec, Canada
- Listed height: 5 ft 11 in (1.80 m)
- Listed weight: 220 lb (100 kg)

Career information
- University: Montréal
- CFL draft: 2010: 3rd round, 16th overall pick

Career history
- 2010–2012: BC Lions
- 2013–2014: Edmonton Eskimos
- 2015: Saskatchewan Roughriders

Awards and highlights
- Grey Cup champion (2011)
- Stats at CFL.ca

Joash Gesse (born September 4, 1986) is a Canadian former professional football linebacker who played in the Canadian Football League (CFL). He was selected sixteenth overall by the BC Lions in the 2010 CFL draft, and signed a contract with the team on May 25, 2010. After spending three seasons with the Lions, he signed with the Edmonton Eskimos with whom he played for two years. He played college football for the Montreal Carabins. He is currently working as a high school teacher in Laval, Quebec.
