= John Bender (gridiron football) =

Canadian football player (born 1987)

Profile
- Position: Offensive lineman

Personal information
- Born: March 9, 1987 (age 39); Three Hills, Alberta, Canada
- Listed height: 6 ft 8 in (2.03 m)
- Listed weight: 325 lb (147 kg)

Career information
- High school: Cochrane (Cochrane, Alberta)
- College: Nevada
- CFL draft: 2010: 3rd round, 17th overall pick

Career history
- 2011: Calgary Stampeders
- Stats at CFL.ca (archive)

John Bender (born March 9, 1987) is a Canadian former professional football offensive lineman. He was selected 17th overall by the Calgary Stampeders in the 2010 CFL draft and signed a contract with the team on May 10, 2011 after finishing his college eligibility. He played college football for the Nevada Wolf Pack. He attended Cochrane High School in Cochrane, Alberta.
