= Cory Greenwood =

Canadian gridiron football player (born 1985)

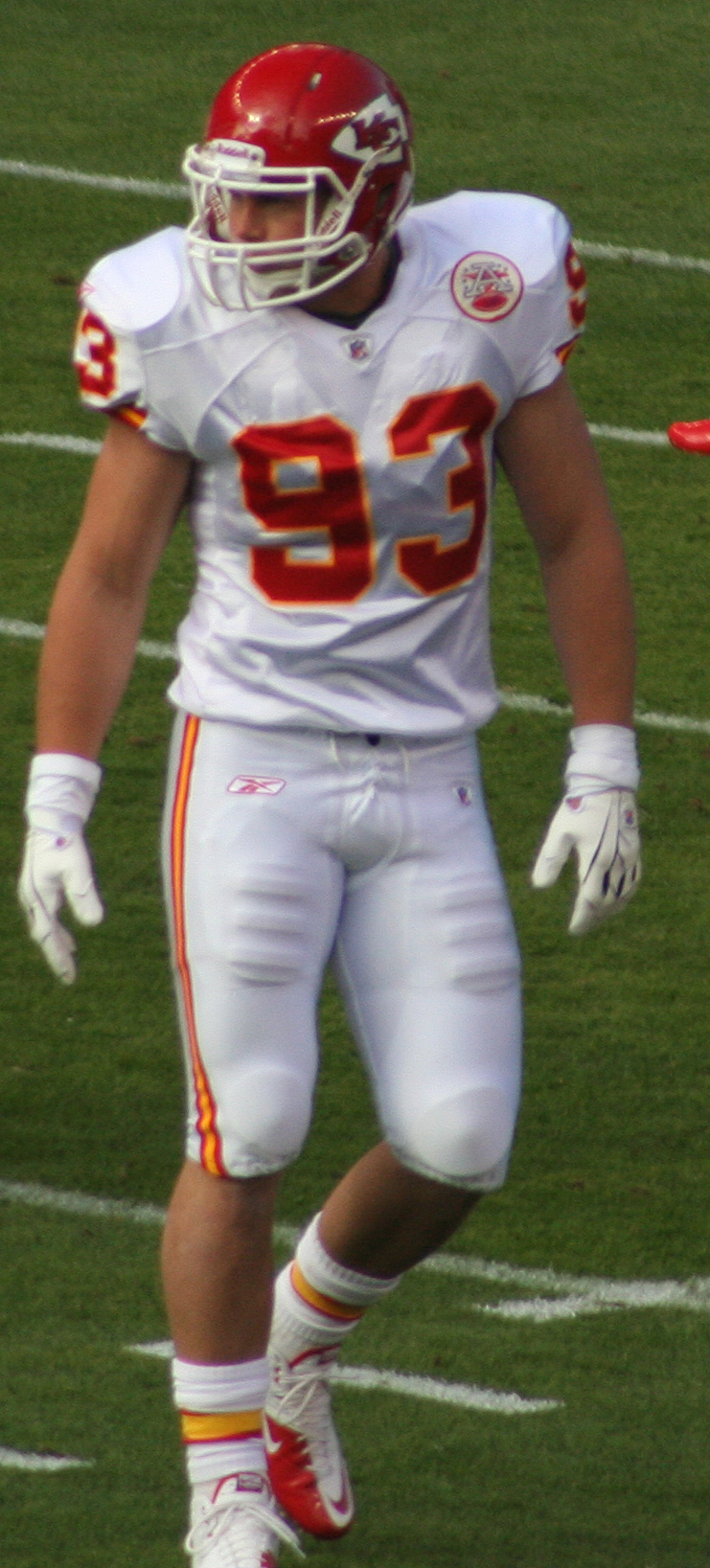
- Greenwood with the Kansas City Chiefs in 2010

No. 93, 36
- Position: Linebacker

Personal information
- Born: June 5, 1985 (age 41); Kingston, Ontario, Canada
- Listed height: 6 ft 2 in (1.88 m)
- Listed weight: 235 lb (107 kg)

Career information
- High school: Kingston (ON) Regiopolis-Notre Dame
- University: Concordia
- CFL draft: 2010: 1st round, 3rd overall pick

Career history
- Kansas City Chiefs (2010−2012); Detroit Lions (2013−2014); Toronto Argonauts (2014–2016); Edmonton Eskimos (2017)*; Calgary Stampeders (2018–2019); Calgary Stampeders (2021)
- * Offseason or practice squad member only

Awards and highlights
- Presidents' Trophy (2009)

Career CFL statistics
- Games played: 48
- Total tackles: 35
- Forced fumbles: 1
- Fumble recoveries: 1
- Stats at Pro Football Reference

Career CFL statistics
- Games played: 40
- Total tackles: 184
- Sacks: 5
- Interceptions: 1
- Stats at CFL.ca

Cory James Greenwood (born June 5, 1985) is a Canadian former professional football linebacker. He is a Grey Cup champion, having won the 106th Grey Cup with the Stampeders. He played college football for the Concordia Stingers from 2006 to 2009. He has the tendency to hit high cuts.

== Early life ==
Greenwood was born and raised in Kingston, Ontario, where he attended Regiopolis-Notre Dame Catholic Secondary School. He later attended Concordia University, where he played college football for the Concordia Stingers from 2006 to 2009. In his senior year, he was the recipient of the Presidents' Trophy for best defensive player in Canadian Interuniversity Sport football.

== Professional career ==
=== CFL draft ===
Coming into the 2010 CFL draft, Greenwood was ranked as the third overall prospect in the Canadian Football League's Amateur Scouting Bureau rankings for players eligible in that year's draft. On the day prior to the draft, the Toronto Argonauts traded the number one overall draft pick to the Saskatchewan Roughriders, along with the eighth overall pick, for punter Jamie Boreham and the second and fourth overall picks in the 2010 draft. To ensure that they would be able to select Greenwood, they then traded their newly acquired fourth overall pick to the BC Lions for the third overall pick. With the trade made official, the Toronto Argonauts selected Greenwood with the third overall pick in the draft.

=== Kansas City Chiefs ===
On May 18, 2010, it was announced that Greenwood had signed a contract with the Kansas City Chiefs of the NFL. Following the Chiefs' 2010 training camp, Greenwood was listed on the team's active roster and depth chart as a third-string middle linebacker and third-string long snapper. In 2011, Greenwood finished the season with 13 tackles. On May 2, 2013, Greenwood was released by the Chiefs.

=== Detroit Lions ===
Greenwood signed with the Detroit Lions on May 6, 2013. On August 19, 2013, he was waived/injured by the Lions. On August 20, 2013, he cleared waivers and was placed on injured reserve. He was released on August 8, 2014.

=== Toronto Argonauts ===
On October 28, 2014, Greenwood signed with the Toronto Argonauts of the Canadian Football League (CFL). Greenwood only appeared in two games for the Argonauts during the 2014 campaign and only playing on special teams. He recorded two special teams tackles in both games. Greenwood saw an increased role for the double-blue in 2015, playing in eight games and contributing 33 defensive tackles, three special teams tackles, one sack and one fumble recovery. Greenwood had a bit of a breakout season in 2016, despite missing a number of games due to a knee injury he suffered in August. He accumulated 70 tackles in only 12 games. After not being re-signed by the Argos following the season, Greenwood became a free agent on February 14, 2017.

=== Edmonton Eskimos ===
On March 8, 2017, Greenwood signed with the Edmonton Eskimos of the CFL. He tore his anterior cruciate ligament on the first day of training camp and missed the entire 2017 CFL season. He was then released on March 14, 2018.

=== Calgary Stampeders ===
On September 12, 2018, Greenwood was signed by the Calgary Stampeders. He was brought in to add Canadian depth and special teams play; in six games on the active roster, Greenwood made two defensive tackles and five special teams tackles. In the playoffs, which culminated in the Stampeders winning the 106th Grey Cup, Greenwood had three more special teams tackles. Prior to free agency, Greenwood signed a one-year extension.

Greenwood's 2019 season saw him play in 12 games, making a then-league leading 79 tackles, as well as two sacks, an interception, and three forced fumbles. However, like in previous seasons, Greenwood was unable to stay healthy and ended up of the injured list following week 14. Greenwood was still recognized as the Calgary nominee for the Most Outstanding Canadian Award. He returned to play in the Stampeders' West-Semi Final loss to the Winnipeg Blue Bombers, where he recorded three defensive tackles.

Greenwood became a free agent on February 11, 2020, and was not signed by any team. He planned on re-signing with the Stampeders, but the 2020 CFL season was postponed and ultimately cancelled. Instead, he re-signed with the Stampeders on January 29, 2021, for the 2021 CFL season.
