= 2006 BC Lions season =

Canadian football team season

- Owner: David Braley
- General manager: Wally Buono
- President: Bob Ackles
- Head coach: Wally Buono
- Home stadium: BC Place Stadium

Results
- Record: 13–5
- Division place: 1st, West
- Playoffs: Won Grey Cup
- Team MOP: Geroy Simon
- Team MOC: Brent Johnson
- Team MOR: Aaron Hunt

Uniform

The 2006 BC Lions season was the 49th season for the team in the Canadian Football League (CFL) and their 53rd overall. The Lions finished in first place in the West Division for a third consecutive season with a 13–5 record and won the 94th Grey Cup over the Montreal Alouettes. Lions quarterback Dave Dickenson was named the game's Most Valuable Player after completing 18 of 29 passes for 184 yards and rushing for 53 yards on six carries. Placekicker Paul McCallum tied a Grey Cup record by kicking six field goals en route to being named the Grey Cup's Most Valuable Canadian. The Lions won their fifth Grey Cup championship in franchise history and first since 2000 when they also defeated the Alouettes.

During the regular season, the Lions were dominant, led by slotback Geroy Simon who caught 105 passes for a club record 1856 yards and 15 touchdowns. Simon was named the league's Most Outstanding Player, becoming the fifth BC Lions player to win the award. Defensive end Brent Johnson was named the league's Most Outstanding Canadian and Most Outstanding Defensive Player, defensive tackle Aaron Hunt was named the league's Most Outstanding Rookie, and offensive tackle Rob Murphy was named the league's Most Outstanding Offensive Lineman. Defensive back Mark Washington was awarded the CFLPA's Outstanding Community Service Award and head coach Wally Buono won the Annis Stukus Trophy as the CFL's Coach of the Year, making it the third time he won the award. The only CFL major trophy not won by the Lions was the CFL's Most Outstanding Special Teams Award, won by Calgary Stampeders kicker Sandro DeAngelis. The Lions had 10 Western All-Stars and a league leading seven CFL All-Stars.

== Offseason ==
=== CFL draft ===
Rd	Pick	Player	Position	School
1	2	Jay Pottinger	LB	McMaster
1	4	Ricky Foley	LB	York
1	6	Dean Valli	OL	Simon Fraser
2	15	Jon Hameister-Ries	OL	Tulsa
5	40	Mike Lindstrom	SB	British Columbia
6	48	Jason Ward	DL	Connecticut

== Preseason ==
Week	Date	Opponent	Score	Result	Attendance	Record
A	Fri, June 2	vs. Calgary Stampeders	26–23	Loss	23,154	0–1
B	Thu, June 8	at Calgary Stampeders	57–13	Win	7,335	1–1

# Games played with white uniforms.

== Regular season ==
=== Season standings ===
West Division
Team	GP	W	L	T	PF	PA	Pts	
BC Lions	18	13	5	0	555	355	26	Details
Calgary Stampeders	18	10	8	0	477	426	20	Details
Saskatchewan Roughriders	18	9	9	0	465	434	18	Details
Edmonton Eskimos	18	7	11	0	399	468	14	Details

=== Season schedule ===
Week	Date	Opponent	Score	Result	Attendance	Record
1	Fri, June 16	vs. Saskatchewan Roughriders	45–28	Win	27,539	1–0
2	Sun, June 25	at Saskatchewan Roughriders	32–24	Loss	21,082	1–1
3	Fri, June 30	vs. Toronto Argonauts	26–19	Win	30,514	2–1
4	Fri, July 7	at Edmonton Eskimos	27–20	Loss	35,035	2–2
5	Fri, July 14	vs. Saskatchewan Roughriders	29–28	Loss	28,513	2–3
6	Fri, July 21	at Calgary Stampeders	43–20	Win	31,210	3–3
7	Sat, July 29	at Toronto Argonauts	28–8	Win	28,356	4–3
8	Fri, Aug 4	vs. Edmonton Eskimos	34–17	Win	27,312	5–3
9	Thu, Aug 10	at Winnipeg Blue Bombers	32–5	Win	25,033	6–3
10	Fri, Aug 18	vs. Edmonton Eskimos	30–28	Win	33,589	7–3
11	Bye					7–3
12	Fri, Sept 1	at Montreal Alouettes	48–13	Win	20,202	8–3
13	Bye					8–3
14	Sat, Sept 16	vs. Montreal Alouettes	36–20	Win	35,971	9–3
15	Sun, Sept 24	at Saskatchewan Roughriders	23–20 (OT)	Loss	27,592	9–4
16	Sat, Sept 30	at Hamilton Tiger-Cats	28–8	Win	24,163	10–4
17	Fri, Oct 6	vs. Calgary Stampeders	39–13	Win	32,232	11–4
18	Sun, Oct 15	at Calgary Stampeders	32–25	Loss	33,546	11–5
19	Sat, Oct 21	vs. Hamilton Tiger-Cats	23–17	Win	31,294	12–5
20	Sat, Oct 28	vs. Winnipeg Blue Bombers	26–16	Win	33,744	13–5

# Games played with colour uniforms.
# Games played with white uniforms.
# Games played with alternate uniforms.

== Player stats ==
=== Passing ===
Player	Att.	Comp	%	Yards	TD	INT	Rating
Dave Dickenson	338	238	70.4	3032	22	7	111.2
Buck Pierce	186	137	73.7	1752	11	6	109.0
Jarious Jackson	79	37	46.8	477	3	2	68.4

=== Rushing ===
Player	Att.	Yards	Avg.	Long	TD
Joe Smith	166	887	5.3	66	9
Buck Pierce	31	294	9.5	39	3
Dave Dickenson	32	195	6.1	15	0
Antonio Warren	41	169	4.1	16	0
Jarious Jackson	46	137	3.0	15	1

=== Receiving ===
Player	No.	Yards	Avg.	Long	TD
Geroy Simon	105	1856	17.7	92	15
Paris Jackson	51	634	12.4	49	4
Ryan Thelwell	53	625	11.8	30	4
Jason Clermont	44	507	11.5	26	3
Joe Smith	51	420	8.2	26	1

== Team ==
=== Coaching staff ===
BC Lions staff
Front Office and Support staff: Owner – David Braley; President and ceo – Bob Ackles; Vice President, Business – George Chayka; General managers – Wally Buono; Director of player personnel – Bob O'Billovich; Player personnel coordinator – Neil McEvoy; Head trainer – Bill Reichelt; Strength and conditioning trainer – Bob Park; Equipment manager – Ken 'Kato' Kasuya	Head coaches: Head coach – Wally Buono; Offensive coaches: Offensive coordinator – Jacques Chapdelaine; Quarterbacks – Steff Kruck; Offensive line – Dan Dorazio; Running backs – Jamie Barresi; Defensive coaches: Defensive coordinator – Dave Ritchie; Defensive line – Mike Roach; Linebackers – Mike Benevides; Special teams coaches: Special teams coordinator – Mike Benevides; → Coaching staff

== Awards and records ==
- Wally Buono, – CFL's Scotiabank Coach of the Year
- Aaron Hunt (DT), – CFL's Most Outstanding Rookie Award
- Brent Johnson (DE), – CFL's Most Outstanding Canadian Award
- Brent Johnson (DE), – CFL's Most Outstanding Defensive Player Award
- Rob Murphy (OG), -CFL's Most Outstanding Offensive Lineman Award
- Geroy Simon (SB), – CFL's Most Outstanding Player Award
- Geroy Simon (SB), – Rogers Fans' Choice Award
- Mark Washington (DB), – CFLPA's Most Outstanding Community Service Award

=== 2006 CFL All-Stars ===
- Korey Banks, Defensive Back
- Otis Floyd, Linebacker
- Brent Johnson, Defensive End
- Barron Miles, Safety
- Rob Murphy, Offensive Tackle
- Geroy Simon, Wide Receiver
- Tyrone Williams, Defensive Tackle

=== Western Division All-Star selections ===
- Korey Banks, Defensive Back
- Otis Floyd, Linebacker
- Aaron Hunt, Defensive Tackle
- Brent Johnson, Defensive End
- Carl Kidd, Special Teams
- Dante Marsh, Cornerback
- Barron Miles, Safety
- Rob Murphy, Offensive Tackle
- Geroy Simon, Wide Receiver
- Tyrone Williams, Defensive Tackle

== Playoffs ==
Week	Game	Date	Opponent	Score	Result	Attendance
21	Bye					
22	West Final	Sun, Nov 12	vs. Saskatchewan Roughriders	45–18	Win	50,084
23	Grey Cup	Sun, Nov 19	Montreal Alouettes	25–14	Win	44,786

# Games played with alternate uniforms.

=== West Final ===
November 12, 2006 @ BC Place Stadium, Vancouver, BC

Team	Q1	Q2	Q3	Q4	Total
Saskatchewan Roughriders	3	1	14	0	18
BC Lions	3	26	3	13	45

Dave Dickenson completed 27-of-37 passes for 274 yards and three touchdowns, as the BC Lions defeated the Saskatchewan Roughriders, 45–18, to score a franchise playoff-record points total and reach the 94th Grey Cup against Montreal. The Lions will play the Montreal Alouettes, who beat the Toronto Argonauts 33–24 in the East Final. BC, who finished first in the West Division for the third straight season, lost the 2004 Grey Cup to Toronto and were downed by Edmonton in the 2005 West Final.

=== Grey Cup ===
November 19, 2006 @ Canad Inns Stadium, Winnipeg, MB

Team	Q1	Q2	Q3	Q4	Total
Montreal Alouettes	0	3	9	2	14
BC Lions	9	10	0	6	25

==== Scoring summary ====
BC Lions (25) – TDs, Ian Smart; FGs Paul McCallum (6); cons., McCallum.

Montreal Alouettes (14) – TDs, Robert Edwards; FGs Damon Duval; cons., Duval; safety touch (2).

First quarter
BC—FG McCallum 34-yard field goal 4:49
BC—FG McCallum 35-yard field goal 12:26
BC—FG McCallum 24-yard field goal 14:15

Second quarter
BC—TD Smart 25-yard run (McCallum convert) 4:12
MTL—FG Duval 43-yard field goal 13:18
BC—FG McCallum 30-yard field goal 15:00

Third quarter
MTL—Safety McCallum concedes in end zone 8:47
MTL—TD Edwards 2-yard run (Duval convert) 13:00

Fourth quarter
BC—FG McCallum 21-yard field goal 4:17
BC—FG McCallum 47-yard field goal 6:28
MTL—Safety McCallum concedes in end zone 13:17

== Roster ==
2006 BC Lions final roster
Quarterbacks: 12 Dave Dickenson; 7 Jarious Jackson; 16 Buck Pierce; Running backs: 37 Alexis Bwenge; 28 Lyle Green; 2 Ian Smart; 33 Joe Smith; Receivers: 8 Bret Anderson K; 82 Jason Clermont; 83 Gilles Colon; 19 Paris Jackson; 85 Kendrick Jones; 81 Geroy Simon; 3 Ryan Thelwell	Offensive linemen: 59 Kelly Bates G; 55 Sherko Haji-Rasouli G/T; 60 Jason Jimenez T; 56 Rob Murphy T; 64 Angus Reid C; 62 Bobby Singh G; Defensive linemen: 95 Ricky Foley DE; 90 Aaron Hunt DT; 97 Brent Johnson DE; 93 Matt Kirk DT; 91 Nautyn McKay-Loescher DE; 96 Tyrone Williams DT; 90 Chris Wilson DE	Linebackers: 45 Tyson Craiggs; 35 Otis Floyd; 6 Javier Glatt; 39 Jamall Johnson; 26 Carl Kidd; 42 Markeith Knowlton; 11 Jason Pottinger; Defensive backs: 24 Korey Banks DH; 17 Sebastian Clovis S; 27 Lavar Glover CB; 31 Dante Marsh CB; 9 Barron Miles S; 21 Ryan Phillips DH; 23 Mark Washington CB	Special teams: 4 Paul McCallum K/P; Reserve roster: 63 Amariah Farrow T; 14 Rob Pikula K/P; 54 Dean Valli C; 36 George White LB; Injured list: 20 Mark Nohra RB; 88 Tony Simmons WR; Suspended: Sandro Sciortino K; Italics indicate International player
