= 2007 BC Lions season =

Canadian football team season

- Owner: David Braley
- General manager: Wally Buono
- President: Bob Ackles
- Head coach: Wally Buono
- Home stadium: BC Place Stadium

Results
- Record: 14–3–1
- Division place: 1st, West
- Playoffs: Lost West Final
- Team MOP: Joe Smith
- Team MOR: Cameron Wake

Uniform

The 2007 BC Lions season was the 50th season for the team in the Canadian Football League (CFL) and their 54th season overall. They finished first in the West Division for the fourth consecutive season with a 14–3–1 record, establishing new franchise records for wins and points in a season and most consecutive first-place finishes. They were defeated in the Western Final 26–17 by the Saskatchewan Roughriders, ending their hopes of repeating their Grey Cup Championship.

== Transactions ==
=== CFL draft ===
Round	Pick	Player	Position	School/Club team
1	8	Adam Nicolson	WR	Ottawa
2	16	Josh Bean	LB	Boise State
2	17 (Via Hamilton)	Tad Crawford	S	Columbia
3	24	Andre Sadeghian	RB	McMaster
4	32	Andrew Jones	DL	McMaster
5	40	Kyle Kirkwood	OL	Ottawa
5	48	Nic Edgson	DB	Idaho State

== Preseason ==
Week	Date	Opponent	Score	Result	Attendance	Record
B	June 15	vs. Saskatchewan Roughriders	24–18	Loss	25,320	0–1
C	June 21	at Edmonton Eskimos	18–12	Loss	31,650	0–2

# Games played with white uniforms.

== Regular season ==
=== Season standings ===
West Division
Pos	Team	Pld	W	L	T	PF	PA	PD	Pts
1	BC Lions (C, Q)	18	14	3	1	542	379	+163	29
2	Saskatchewan Roughriders (Q)	18	12	6	0	530	432	+98	24
3	Calgary Stampeders (Q)	18	7	10	1	473	527	−54	15
4	Edmonton Eskimos	18	5	12	1	399	509	−110	11

Source: "2007 Regular Season Standings". Canadian Football League. Archived from the original on 2008-09-21.
(C) First round bye; (Q) Qualified for playoffs

=== Season schedule ===
Week	Date	Opponent	Score	Result	Attendance	Record
1	June 28	at Toronto Argonauts	24–22	Win	29,157	1–0
2	July 6	vs. Edmonton Eskimos	29–9	Win	32,893	2–0
3	July 13	at Saskatchewan Roughriders	42–12	Win	26,981	3–0
4	July 19	vs. Hamilton Tiger-Cats	22–18	Win	29,045	4–0
5	July 28	at Calgary Stampeders	32–27	Win	28,564	5–0
6	Aug 2	vs. Saskatchewan Roughriders	21–9	Loss	31,858	5–1
7	Aug 10	vs. Winnipeg Blue Bombers	22–21	Loss	31,525	5–2
8	Aug 17	at Calgary Stampeders	45–45	Tie	30,826	5–2–1
9	Bye					5–2–1
10	Aug 31	vs. Montreal Alouettes	46–14	Win	32,115	6–2–1
11	Sept 9	at Montreal Alouettes	32–14	Loss	20,202	6–3–1
12	Sept 15	vs. Toronto Argonauts	40–7	Win	31,156	7–3–1
13	Sept 22	at Saskatchewan Roughriders	37–34	Win	28,800	8–3–1
14	Sept 29	vs. Calgary Stampeders	42–9	Win	32,263	9–3–1
15	Oct 5	at Winnipeg Blue Bombers	26–20	Win	26,593	10–3–1
16	Oct 13	at Edmonton Eskimos	24–18	Win	33,663	11–3–1
17	Oct 20	vs. Edmonton Eskimos	37–26	Win	37,011	12–3–1
18	Oct 26	at Hamilton Tiger-Cats	27–19	Win	19,322	13–3–1
19	Nov 3	vs. Calgary Stampeders	25–24	Win	34,242	14–3–1

# Games played with colour uniforms.
# Games played with white uniforms.
# Games played with alternate uniforms.

=== Roster ===
2007 BC Lions final roster
Quarterbacks: 12 (United States) Dave Dickenson; 13 (United States) Gino Guidugli; 7 (United States) Jarious Jackson; Running backs: 37 (Canada) Alexis Bwenge; 28 (Canada) Lyle Green; 32 (Canada) Andre Sadeghian; 2 (Jamaica) Ian Smart; 33 (United States) Joe Smith; Wide receivers: 1 (Canada) Josh Boden; 19 (Canada) Paris Jackson; 84 (Canada) Adam Nicolson; Slotbacks: 8 (Canada) Bret Anderson; 82 (Canada) Jason Clermont; 81 (United States) Geroy Simon	Offensive linemen: 59 (Canada) Kelly Bates G; 63 (United States) Amariah Farrow T; 55 (Iran) Sherko Haji-Rasouli G; 60 (United States) Jason Jimenez T; 56 (United States) Rob Murphy T; 64 (Canada) Angus Reid C; 54 (Canada) Dean Valli G/C; Defensive linemen: 95 (Canada) Ricky Foley DE; 90 (United States) Aaron Hunt DT; 97 (Canada) Brent Johnson DE; 93 (Canada) Matt Kirk DT; 91 (United States) Cameron Wake DE; 96 (United States) Tyrone Williams DT	Linebackers: 51 (Canada) Tyson Craiggs LS/MLB; 35 (United States) Otis Floyd OLB; 6 (Canada) Javier Glatt MLB; 41 (United States) Tim Goodwell MLB; 42 (United States) Markeith Knowlton OLB; 11 (Canada) Jason Pottinger OLB/MLB; Defensive backs: 24 (United States) Korey Banks DH; 3 (Canada) Tad Crawford S; 25 (United States) Jerome Dennis DH/CB; 27 (United States) Lavar Glover CB; 31 (United States) Dante Marsh CB; 16 (United States) Barron Miles S; 21 (United States) Ryan Phillips DH; 23 (United States) Mark Washington CB/DH	Special teams: 4 (Canada) Paul McCallum K/P; Developmental squad: 92 (United States) Brandon Ala DE; 29 (United States) James Bethea CB; 57 (Canada) Andrew Jones G; 83 (United States) Chad Mock WR; 80 (United States) Robert Ortiz WR; 20 (United States) Butchie Wallace RB; 36 (Canada) Konrad Wasiela CB; Reserve roster: 67 (Canada) Jon Hameister-Ries G; 16 (United States) Buck Pierce QB; 69 (Canada) Lorne Plante G; 18 (United States) Cory Rodgers WR; Injured list: 17 (Canada) Sebastian Clovis S; 39 (United States) Jamall Johnson LB

=== Week 1: at Toronto Argonauts ===
	1	2	3	4	Total
Lions	7	3	14	0	24
Argonauts	0	15	0	7	22

at Rogers Centre, Toronto

Joe Smith took the lustre off a record-setting performance by Bashir Levingston. Smith's two third-quarter touchdowns rallied the Grey Cup-champion BC Lions to a 24–22 win Thursday over the Argonauts in the first game of the CFL season. The loss tarnished Levingston's CFL-record 129-yard return of a missed field goal late in the first half that thrilled the Rogers Centre gathering of 29,157 and put Toronto ahead 15–10.

=== Week 2: vs. Edmonton Eskimos ===
	1	2	3	4	Total
Eskimos	3	3	0	3	9
Lions	0	16	7	6	29

at BC Place Stadium, Vancouver

BC Quarterback Dave Dickenson continued his slow start to the CFL season, Friday but his only touchdown pass secured a 29–9, BC Lions home opener win over the Edmonton Eskimos. The 100-yard touchdown drive ended with a 36-yard completion to slotback Jason Clermont midway through the third quarter for a 23–6 lead. While kicker Paul McCallum completed the Lions attack with five field goals and a convert.

=== Week 3: at Saskatchewan Roughriders ===
	1	2	3	4	Total
Lions	1	20	7	14	42
Roughriders	0	0	10	2	12

at Mosaic Stadium at Taylor Field, Regina, Saskatchewan

The BC Lions capitalized on the Saskatchewan Roughriders' mistakes to win the battle of the two unbeaten West teams 42–12 Friday. Riders penalties, fumbles and interceptions were abundant and as a result, the home team was no threat to win the game for most of the evening. The Riders briefly brought the subdued crowd of 26,981 back into the game in the second with a Matt Dominguez touchdown, but they couldn't recover and allowed two touchdowns in the last minute of the game. Joe Smith found the end zone twice for the Lions (3–0–0), while Jason Clermont had seven receptions for 68 yards. In the second quarter however, the Lions would lose quarterbacks Dave Dickenson and Buck Pierce to injuries leaving third-stringer Jarious Jackson to finish the game.

=== Week 4: vs. Hamilton Tiger-Cats ===
	1	2	3	4	Total
Tiger-Cats	3	3	6	6	18
Lions	7	2	0	13	22

at BC Place Stadium, Vancouver

The BC Lions were rescued again by their depth at quarterback Thursday as they staggered to a 22–18 victory over the Hamilton Tiger-Cats. The Lions were down to their last quarterback as Buck Pierce, who started with a hand injury in place of Dave Dickenson, left the game with sore ribs after throwing his second interception and was replaced by Jarious Jackson. In addition, Lions running back Joe Smith was taken off the field on a stretcher after fumbling late in the fourth quarter. He briefly had no feeling in his legs but later recovered in the locker room. However, Jackson remained healthy and found wideout Paris Jackson for a 64-yard gain that set up Paul McCallum's 14-yard insurance field goal for a 22–12 cushion. He also had Paris Jackson open in the end zone on a play that drew a pass interference call. The 31-yard penalty led to the third-string quarterback's touchdown plunge. The victory left the Lions as the CFL's only unbeaten team at 4–0 while Hamilton dropped to 0–4.

=== Week 5: at Calgary Stampeders ===
	1	2	3	4	Total
Lions	5	6	14	7	32
Stampeders	0	11	0	16	27

at McMahon Stadium, Calgary

The BC Lions remained the only unbeaten team in the CFL with a 32–27 win over the Calgary Stampeders on Saturday. BC quarterback Jarious Jackson, who replaced Buck Pierce to start the second half, threw touchdown passes to Geroy Simon and Cory Rodgers while Joe Smith ran in a 38-yard score. Paul McCallum kicked two field goals. Calgary counterpart Henry Burris linked up with Rob Cote and Jeremaine Copeland for touchdowns. Sandro DeAngelis made two field goals, but he was wide on another attempt and had a kick blocked. Jackson was 3-for-7 in passing for two touchdowns and he was intercepted once in relief of Pierce, who was 7-for-14 and was intercepted once in the first half. Burris completed half of 44 pass attempts for 423 yards and two touchdowns, but was intercepted four times. Down 25–11 heading into the fourth quarter, the Stampeders chased the Lions with Burris's 36-yard touchdown pass to Copeland at 8:56, DeAngelis's convert and his earlier 26-yard field goal to pull within four points. But a Burris interception stalled Calgary's momentum as LaVar Glover picked him off and returned the ball 30 yards, which set up Jackson's 15-yard touchdown pass to Rodgers at 11:48 and put the Lions up 32–21. Burris replied on a two-yard run with 1:19 remaining, after finding receiver Brett Ralph within five yards of the end zone, to keep Calgary's hopes of a win alive. The attempted two-point convert was unsuccessful and the Lions hung on for the win.

=== Week 6: vs. Saskatchewan Roughriders ===
	1	2	3	4	Total
Roughriders	1	14	3	3	21
Lions	1	7	1	0	9

at BC Place Stadium, Vancouver

The Saskatchewan Roughriders took advantage of a third-string quarterback, and running back Wes Cates had a big game with over 100 yards rushing as they defeated the BC Lions 21–9 Thursday night to hand the defending Grey Cup champions their first loss of the CFL season. A crowd of 31,858 saw the Riders improve their record to 4–2 and move to within two points of the first-place Lions in the CFL West. BC dropped to 5–1. The Lions were forced to start third-string quarterback Jarious Jackson because of injuries to Dave Dickenson and Buck Pierce. Jackson, who came off the bench three times this season to preserve Lions wins, showed some flashes but struggled in his first CFL start. He completed 16 of 38 passes for 183 yards, threw one touchdown pass but was intercepted three times.

=== Week 7: vs. Winnipeg Blue Bombers ===
	1	2	3	4	Total
Blue Bombers	0	10	0	12	22
Lions	10	7	4	0	21

at BC Place Stadium, Vancouver

A crowd of 31,525 saw the Winnipeg Blue Bombers erase an eight-point deficit when wide receiver Terrence Edwards scored on a six-yard touchdown pass from quarterback Kevin Glenn at 3:57 of the fourth quarter. That came one play after Edwards hauled in a 52-yard pass. Winnipeg's two-point convert failed but BC's Ian Smart fumbled the kickoff that would set up Rob Pikula's winning field goal. Pikula, a punter, was pressed into placekicking after Troy Westwood pulled a hamstring early in the game. He also hit from 41 and 31 yards. A last-ditch Lions drive ended when quarterback Buck Pierce threw an incompletion on a third-and-five with about 40 seconds left. Paul McCallum was successful early kicking two field goals from 12 and 45 yards, but missed on a critical 43-yarder with just five minutes remaining in the game that would have secured a BC win. With the loss BC is now tied with the Saskatchewan Roughriders for first place in the CFL West Division.

=== Week 8: at Calgary Stampeders ===
	1	2	3	4	OT	Total
Lions	7	14	7	3	14	45
Stampeders	10	7	7	7	14	45

at McMahon Stadium, Calgary

The Calgary Stampeders jumped out to an early 7–0 lead after Henry Burris capped off a five-play, 59-yard drive by plunging into the end zone from one yard out. On the drive, Joffrey Reynolds carried the ball three times for 30 yards, while Nik Lewis caught one ball and scrambled for a 28-yard gain. The BC Lions responded right away to tie the score as Buck Pierce engineered an 11-play, 80-yard scoring drive. He capped off the drive by completing an eight-yard touchdown pass to receiver Jason Clermont. With just six seconds to go in the first quarter, the Stamps regained the lead when Sandro DeAngelis kicked a 29-yard field goal.

Just three plays after Ryan Phillips picked off an errant pass by Burris to record his league-leading sixth interception, Pierce tossed a 13-yard touchdown pass to Clermont to put the Lions up 14–10. The Stamps then completed an impressive eight-play, 80-yard scoring drive capped off by Jeremaine Copeland's fourth touchdown of the season. Late in the first half, Joe Smith rambled 18 yards across the goal line to cap off a five-play, 67-yard scoring drive to put the Lions up 21–17.

The see-saw battle continued in the third quarter as Calgary regained a three-point lead when Burris scored his second one-yard touchdown of the game. Once again, the Lions responded as Pierce tossed a 30-yard pass to Tony Simmons in the Calgary end zone before Paul McCallum kicked a 28-yard field goal. With 40 seconds left in the game, Lewis hauled in a seven-yard touchdown pass from Burris to tie the game at 31–31 and send it into overtime. The teams would continue scoring in overtime, but would eventually end the game with a tie.

=== Week 10: vs. Montreal Alouettes ===
	1	2	3	4	Total
Alouettes	0	7	7	0	14
Lions	0	17	12	17	46

at BC Place Stadium, Vancouver

Joe Smith's power and Ian Smart's speed delivered a knockout blow for the BC Lions in their 46–14 CFL romp over the Montreal Alouettes. Smith, the bruising running back, smashed and crashed for 161 yards on 20 carries and two touchdowns as the Lions halted a three-game winless skid in convincing style. Smith and his speedy backfield partner Smart, sliced and slashed for a pair touchdowns and had 63 yards on 10 carries as the Lions climbed back into first place in the CFL West. The pair's effectiveness showed on Smart's first touchdown in the fourth quarter. With the Lions knocking on Montreal's door, everyone in the roaring crowd of 32,115 expected Smith to get the ball. Instead, quarterback Jarious Jackson faked the ball to Smith, then tossed it to Smart who blazed nine yards for the touchdown.

The Lions shredded the Montreal defence — ranked second in the league against both the pass and run — for 420 yards. BC rushed for a combined 275 yards, with Jackson, making just his second CFL start, adding 46 yards on three carries.

While the running backs rumbled the Lions defence roared as defensive back Ryan Phillips stepped in front of an Anthony Calvillo pass in the third quarter and returned his CFL-leading seventh interception 92 yards for a touchdown. Besides throwing the interception, Calvillo was sacked five times, forced to hurry several throws and at times was left looking dazed and confused. He was shaken up but left the field on his own steam after a sack by Jamall Johnson in the fourth quarter.

The win improved the Lions record to 6–2–1 and moves them one point ahead of Saskatchewan in the CFL West. While Montreal's loss continued their on-going frustration when playing at BC Place Stadium which they haven't won in since 2000.

=== Week 11: at Montreal Alouettes ===
	1	2	3	4	Total
Lions	3	10	0	1	14
Alouettes	0	12	13	7	32

at Molson Stadium, Montreal

Marcus Brady won his first start as an Alouette and Jarrett Payton scored three touchdowns as Montreal downed the BC Lions 32–14 on Sunday afternoon.

The 6–4 Alouettes avenged a 46–14 loss in Vancouver last week to the 6–3–1 Lions, and beat BC for only the second time in 10 meetings since 2003.

Brady looked at home running the Montreal attack in place of Anthony Calvillo, who is out indefinitely with a torn rotator cuff, He won the battle of the back-ups over Jarious Jackson, who started a second game for BC in place of injured Dave Dickenson and Buck Pierce.

Payton, who rushed for more than 100 yards, scored on runs of one, two and three yards, while Damon Duval had three field goals for Montreal.

Cory Rodgers caught a touchdown pass and Paul McCallum had two field goals and a single for the Lions, who played their 900th CFL game since 1954.

=== Week 12: vs. Toronto Argonauts ===
	1	2	3	4	Total
Argonauts	0	0	7	0	7
Lions	3	9	8	20	40

at BC Place Stadium, Vancouver

Workhorse running back Joe Smith plunged for two touchdowns as the BC Lions regained first place in the CFL West with a 40–7 victory over the Toronto Argonauts on Saturday. Smith, who had 99 rushing yards and is within six of 1,000 for the season, now has 12 rushing touchdowns. His clinching major made it 27–7 and it was set up by Ryan Phillips's league-leading eighth interception as the Lions turned a multitude of Toronto turnovers into points.

Defensive end Brent Johnson recovered a fumble by Toronto quarterback Michael Bishop after he was sacked for the second time by Cameron Wake and rambled 25 yards to the end zone. BC took a 27–7 lead early in the fourth quarter after Mark Washington punched the ball away from Argo receiver Andre Talbot who leaped for a Bishop pass near midfield.

BC quarterback Jarious Jackson made his fourth consecutive start in place of veteran Dave Dickenson (concussion) and Buck Pierce (shoulder) and managed the game better than his Toronto counterpart.

He faced the league's top-rated pass defence but it was Bishop who was picked off three times. Korey Banks's interception led to one of Paul McCallum's five field goals, the longest from 46 yards. McCallum added three converts while Toronto kicker Noel Prefontaine conceded two safeties.

The win moved the 7–3–1 Lions one point ahead of the Saskatchewan Roughriders, who lost 44–22 to the Calgary Stampeders.

=== Week 13: at Saskatchewan Roughriders ===
	1	2	3	4	Total
Lions	7	8	7	15	37
Roughriders	15	9	7	3	34

at Mosaic Stadium at Taylor Field, Regina

The BC Lions pawed their way to an unlikely 37–34 victory on Saturday night, dampening and darkening the party mood among 28,800 fans at the sold out Mosaic Stadium at Taylor Field, when Geroy Simon caught the game-winning 33-yard touch down catch with 34 seconds remaining in the game.

The Lions offence couldn't get anything going in the first half, outside of the line creating holes and Joe Smith churning up yardage. BC quarterback, Jarious Jackson was only 3-of-14 for 28 yards passing in the first half, while the Saskatchewan Roughriders marched three times for an early 22–7 lead in the first 16 minutes of the game. The Riders even had 200-plus more yards in offence than the Lions at the end of the first half.

Tensions between the two teams erupted before the end of the first half when Riders tackle Scott Schultz had rolled on to Jarious Jackson that caused BC guard Sherko Haji-Rasouli to throw in punches and eventually popped Schultz's helmet off. Meanwhile, Rob Murphy was standing over Saskatchewan rush end John Chick, while his left hand was on Chick's chin strap and his right arm was cocked and ready. In the end, the referee ended up giving penalties to Rob Murphy and Scott Schultz for unnecessary roughness and decided to eject BC receiver Cory Rodgers out of the game during the melee, who had earlier caught two of Jackson's three completed first half passes, one of them resulting in a touchdown. Riders' GM Eric Tillman eventually followed Lions' President Bobby Ackles into the hallway yelling "That's not in the rulebook! That's not in the rulebook!"

In the second half, Jackson became more effective completing his first six passes and eventually Joe Smith ran in for a 3-yard touchdown to cut Saskatchewan's lead to 24–22. Then with momentum on their side, the Lions decided on a 3rd and 1, to keep their drive alive on their own 15-yard line. Instead, Saskatchewan's defence was able to sack Jackson before he crossed the first down marker causing a turnover on downs. With good field position Kerry Joseph was able to complete Saskatchewan's drive when he ran in the end zone making it a 31–22, Roughriders lead.

But in the fourth quarter, Jackson would complete a 5-yard touchdown pass to Jason Clermont to cut the Riders lead to 31–29. The Riders only score in the fourth quarter came when kicker Luca Congi kicked a 25-yard field goal to make it a 34–29 Riders lead. However, late in the game, with the Roughriders leading 34–30, Jackson was able to find Geroy Simon in the end zone for a 33-yard touchdown on a third down play to give the Lions the lead and the win with just 34 seconds left.

The Lions (8–3–1) defence then took over picking off a Kerry Joseph pass on the 'Riders' last-gasp drive to hang on and extend the club's lead atop the West Division by three points.

=== Week 14: vs. Calgary Stampeders ===
	1	2	3	4	Total
Stampeders	1	3	0	5	9
Lions	14	7	7	14	42

at BC Place Stadium, Vancouver

Jarious Jackson threw three touchdown passes and the Lions defence stopped the Calgary Stampeders from scoring a touchdown in a 42–9 CFL rout Saturday night.

The Lions scored on their first two possessions and led 14–1 with 6:30 gone. Then the earth caved in for Calgary as Akili Smith, the former NFL first-round pick who was making his first CFL start in place of Henry Burris, limped off with about five minutes left in the second quarter with a slight groin pull after being sacked by Korey Banks. Knowing they had the Stampeders on the ropes the Lion defence made things miserable for inexperienced backup Barrick Nealy, who spent much of the game running for his life and took some brutal hits.

Jackson, who moved up the depth chart after injuries to Dave Dickenson and Buck Pierce, improved his record to 4–2 as a starter. He methodically picked the Stampeder defence apart with pin-point passes, then showed his mobility with several key runs. His performance is an indication that Jarious Jackson is starting to become more comfortable at the starting position. Furthermore, Lions receiver Geroy Simon indicated that the team has become confident with Jackson as their starting quarterback.

=== Week 15: at Winnipeg Blue Bombers ===
	1	2	3	4	Total
Lions	6	13	0	7	26
Blue Bombers	4	0	7	9	20

at Canad Inns Stadium, Winnipeg

=== Week 16 at Edmonton Eskimos ===
at Commonwealth Stadium, Edmonton

=== Week 17 vs. Edmonton Eskimos ===
at BC Place Stadium, Vancouver

=== Week 18 at Hamilton Tiger Cats ===
at Ivor Wynne Stadium, Hamilton, Ontario

=== Week 19 vs Calgary Stampeders ===
	1	2	3	4	Total
Stampeders	7	10	0	7	24
Lions	9	3	13	0	25

at BC Place Stadium, Vancouver

This was the final game of the BC Lions' regular season. After the game the Lions finished the season with a record of 14–3–1. The final score of this game was 25–24 for the Lions. The Calgary Stampeders tried to win the game at the last moment with no time left on the clock by attempting a field goal. The field goal was attempted but, it failed because the ball bounced off of the pole, which gave The Lions another big win.

== Player stats ==
=== Passing ===
Player	Att.	Comp	%	Yards	TD	INT	Rating
Jarious Jackson	304	167	54.9	2553	18	10	88.9
Buck Pierce	127	81	63.8	1013	5	3	91.7
Dave Dickenson	87	56	64.4	740	3	3	88.3
Gino Guidugli	11	6	54.5	138	1	1	92.2
Ian Smart	1	0	0.0	0	0	0	2.1

=== Rushing ===
Player	Att.	Yards	Avg.	TD	Fumbles
Joe Smith	281	1510	5.4	18	2
Jarious Jackson	49	265	5.4	3	8
Buck Pierce	22	164	7.5	1	0
Ian Smart	32	158	4.9	3	3
Dave Dickenson	9	44	4.9	0	0

=== Receiving ===
Player	No.	Yards	Avg.	Long	TD
Geroy Simon	72	1308	18.2	96	6
Jason Clermont	86	1158	13.5	93	7
Paris Jackson	65	962	14.8	64	5
Cory Rodgers	27	351	13.0	51	3
Josh Boden	14	237	16.9	49	0

== Playoffs ==
Week	Game	Date	Opponent	Score	Result	Attendance
20	Bye					
21	West Final	Nov 18	vs. Saskatchewan Roughriders	26–17	Loss	54,712

# Games played with alternate uniforms.

=== West final ===
Team	Q1	Q2	Q3	Q4	Total
Saskatchewan Roughriders	10	3	13	0	26
BC Lions	7	3	7	0	17

This was the third meeting in four years between the Saskatchewan Roughriders and the BC Lions in the Western Final. In each meeting, the team that had lost the season series between the two teams, won the Western Final.

== Awards and honours ==
- Ian Smart (RB), John Agro Special Teams Award
- Jason Clermont, REC, Most Outstanding Canadian Award
- Cameron Wake, DE, Jackie Parker Trophy
- Cameron Wake, DE, Norm Fieldgate Trophy

=== 2007 CFL All-Stars ===
- Kelly Bates, Offensive Guard
- Jason Clermont, Receiver
- Rob Murphy, Offensive Tackle
- Ryan Phillips, Defensive Back
- Geroy Simon, Receiver
- Ian Smart, Special Teams
- Joe Smith, Running Back
- Cameron Wake, Defensive End
- Tyrone Williams, Defensive Tackle

=== Western Division All-Star Selections ===
- Korey Banks, Defensive Back
- Kelly Bates, Offensive Guard
- Jason Clermont, Receiver
- Otis Floyd, Linebacker
- Lavar Glover, Cornerback
- Aaron Hunt, Defensive Tackle
- Paul McCallum, Punter
- Barron Miles, Safety
- Rob Murphy, Offensive Tackle
- Ryan Phillips, Defensive Back
- Geroy Simon, Receiver
- Ian Smart, Special Teams
- Joe Smith, Running Back
- Cameron Wake, Defensive End
- Tyrone Williams, Defensive Tackle
