= Danny McManus =

American gridiron football player (born 1965)

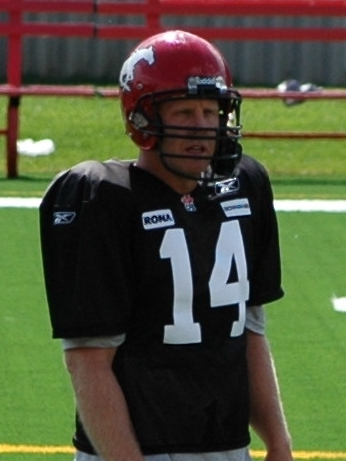
- McManus with the Calgary Stampeders in 2006

Winnipeg Blue Bombers
- Title: Assistant general manager Director of U.S. scouting

Personal information
- Born: June 17, 1965 (age 61); Dania Beach, Florida, U.S.
- Listed height: 6 ft 0 in (1.83 m)
- Listed weight: 220 lb (100 kg)

Career information
- Position: Quarterback (No. 14)
- High school: South Broward (Hollywood, Florida)
- College: Florida State
- NFL draft: 1988: 11/ Pick 282nd round

Career history

Playing
- 1988: Kansas City Chiefs
- 1990–1992: Winnipeg Blue Bombers
- 1993–1995: BC Lions
- 1996–1997: Edmonton Eskimos
- 1998–2005: Hamilton Tiger-Cats
- 2006: Edmonton Eskimos*
- 2006: Calgary Stampeders
- * Offseason or practice squad member only

Coaching
- 2008: Hamilton Tiger-Cats (assistant)

Operations
- 2009–2013: Hamilton Tiger-Cats (scout)
- 2014–present: Winnipeg Blue Bombers (assistant GM)

Awards and highlights
- 5× Grey Cup champion (1990, 1994, 1999, 2019, 2021); Grey Cup MVP (1999); CFL MOP (1999); CFL All-Star (1999); CFL East All-Star (1999); Rogers Fans' Choice Award (2004); Tom Pate Memorial Award (2005); Records: 1st in Hamilton Tiger-Cats career passing yards (33,841), pass attempts (4,257), completions (2,368) and touchdown passes (164)
- Stats at CFL.ca (archive)
- Canadian Football Hall of Fame (Class of 2011)

Danny McManus (born June 17, 1965) is an American former professional football player who was a quarterback in the Canadian Football League (CFL). He passed for over 53,000 yards in 17 seasons. He currently serves as the assistant general manager and director for U.S. scouting for the Winnipeg Blue Bombers. He played every season in the league from 1990 to 2006, as a member of the Winnipeg Blue Bombers, BC Lions, Edmonton Eskimos, Hamilton Tiger-Cats, and finally with the Calgary Stampeders. He is a five-time Grey Cup champion, having won three times as a player and twice in a front office capacity. He is fifth all-time in passing yards in the CFL and is the all-time leading passer for the Tiger-Cats. He has also worked as a color commentator for TSN's CFL broadcasts, having previously appeared as a guest analyst on the CFL on CBC late in his playing career.

== College career ==
McManus spent four seasons at Florida State University, from 1984 to 1987, coached by Bobby Bowden (McManus also went to Florida State in 1983, but was redshirted). McManus was named the starter as quarterback in 1985. After four victories, he suffered a pair of concussions and he spent the rest of 1985 on the bench. The following season, McManus came out of the backup position to end the year as the starter and threw for 872 yards and seven touchdowns. He was named the Seminole's offensive most valuable player.

In 1987, he started every game for Florida State, leading them to an 11–1 record and a spot in the Fiesta Bowl, which they won 31–28 over Nebraska. McManus, who threw for 375 yards and three touchdowns in the bowl game, was named the most valuable player, and wound up with 1,984 yards and fourteen touchdowns on the year. After this season, McManus entered the NFL draft.

== Professional career ==
=== National Football League ===
McManus was selected in the 1988 NFL draft in the eleventh round by the Kansas City Chiefs. He made the Chiefs out of training camp, and spent his first, and only, National Football League season on the bench as the third quarterback. McManus saw no action and was released during 1989's training camp by the Chiefs and was not signed during the 1989 season.

=== Winnipeg Blue Bombers ===
Unable to find a place to play in 1989, McManus signed with the Canadian Football League's Winnipeg Blue Bombers in time for the 1990 season. The Blue Bombers had won two Grey Cups in the previous three years and in McManus's first year with team they won the 78th Grey Cup. McManus, the Blue Bombers' backup all year, threw for a total of 946 yards and seven touchdowns during the season, and also tossed a touchdown in the Grey Cup in a rare appearance for the backup in the championship game.

Through 1991 and 1992, McManus remained with the Blue Bombers as the backup quarterback to Matt Dunigan. He made his second Grey Cup appearance in 1992, again coming in for a relief stint. This time the Blue Bombers lost the 80th Grey Cup 24–10 to Calgary at SkyDome in Toronto, Ontario.

=== BC Lions ===
After the Grey Cup, he left Winnipeg as a free agent and ended up signing with the BC Lions. He started three games in 1993 when starting quarterback Danny Barrett was injured. For 1994, McManus was again the backup, this time to Kent Austin. In the West Final he replaced Austin and led the Lions to a trip to a comeback victory over the Calgary Stampeders in a driving snowstorm culminating in a last second TD pass that sent the Lions to the Grey Cup Game at home in Vancouver. In the 82nd Grey Cup, Austin was knocked out of the game and McManus had to take over at halftime, and ended up leading the Lions on a drive downfield setting up Lui Passaglia to kick a game-winning field goal, giving BC a 26–23 victory over the Baltimore Stallions. It was McManus's second Grey Cup and third appearance in five years in the Canadian Football League.

In 1995, McManus was given the reins as the Lions' full-time starter. McManus threw for 4,655 yards (second in the league behind his old mentor Dunigan) and 19 touchdowns. But the Lions' efforts to defend their Grey Cup were quickly derailed come playoff time, as the Lions were defeated by the Edmonton Eskimos in the Western Division Semi-Final despite McManus throwing for 333 yards and two touchdowns.

=== Edmonton Eskimos ===
Any animosity McManus must have felt to the Eskimos must have quickly cooled, however, as he signed with Edmonton during the off-season as a free agent following his release by British Columbia.

In 1996, McManus once again was second in the league in passing yardage, this time behind Doug Flutie, with 4,425 yards. This total was third highest for a single season in Edmonton history. His 582 pass attempts were second in a single season in Edmonton history. The Eskimos finished second in the Western Division. In the West Semi-Final at Commonwealth Stadium in Edmonton, the Eskimos slaughtered McManus’ former team, the Winnipeg Blue Bombers, 68–7. Edmonton defeated Calgary 15–12 the following week in the West Final. In the Grey Cup game, played in driving snow at Ivor Wynne Stadium, the Toronto Argonauts defeated Edmonton in the 84th Grey Cup 43–37. McManus had an excellent game despite the conditions with 413 yards (4th all-time in a Grey Cup game) and three touchdowns (tied for 2nd all-time in a Grey Cup game), but was outplayed by Toronto's Flutie, who was named the most outstanding player. McManus's only interception of the game came when Doug Flutie's brother Darren fell trying to catch a well-thrown ball, and the ball ricocheted off of Flutie and into the waiting arms of a Toronto defensive back, who returned it for a touchdown.

1997 was a slight regression for him, but not for the Eskimos as they won their division for the first time since 1991. McManus fell to fourth in passing yardage but was still the Edmonton nominee for Most Outstanding Player. Edmonton was hosting the 85th Grey Cup that year and hopes were high that the Eskimos would play at it, but Edmonton lost a heart-breaking Western final to the Saskatchewan Roughriders 31–30. McManus threw for an excellent 407 yards in the game in a losing effort.

=== Hamilton Tiger-Cats ===
McManus left the Eskimos as a free agent for 1998, as the Hamilton Tiger-Cats signed both the veteran quarterback and his all-time favorite receiver, Darren Flutie. McManus arrived on a talent-laden team and did not disappoint, finishing second in passing yardage for the second time in his career and becoming only the second Hamilton quarterback to pass for over 4,000 yards in a season. The Tiger-Cats warred with the fast-rising Montreal Alouettes and their veteran quarterback Anthony Calvillo all season, including a rare tie in a regular-season meeting between the two teams. Hamilton and Montreal finished even at 12–5–1, but Hamilton took first place on their superior head-to-head record. When the two teams inevitably clashed in the East final, Hamilton took a thriller 22–20. However, all-star quarterback Jeff Garcia and his Calgary Stampeders beat Hamilton 26–24 in the 86th Grey Cup.

Despite the disappointment of 1998, McManus rebounded in superb fashion for 1999. Throwing for 5,334 yards and 28 touchdowns, McManus won his first, and only, Most Outstanding Player award. The icing on the cake came on the 87th Grey Cup, where McManus thwarted the Stampeders' drive for a repeat in a rematch of the previous year's championship game. Garcia was gone to the NFL but his replacement Dave Dickenson had proven very dangerous; however, the Tiger-Cats took their first Grey Cup since 1986 with a 32–21 victory. It was McManus's third Grey Cup and his sixth appearance in the big game.

In 2000, McManus set the CFL record with six straight seasons throwing for at least 4,000 yards. But, after their Grey Cup victory, the Tiger-Cats were beginning to enter a long spiral to the East Division basement. The team finished a disappointing 9–9 and lost the East Semi-Final to Winnipeg. 2001 was a slight resurgence as the Tiger-Cats finished 11–7, but another loss to Winnipeg in the East Final sent the Tiger-Cats home early. By 2002, the Tiger-Cats were running on fumes and went down to 7–11, ahead of only the expansion Ottawa Renegades. For the first time in his CFL career, Danny McManus missed the playoffs.

McManus turned 38 during the 2003 CFL season and there was speculation he might retire following the season. The Tiger-Cats were one of the worst teams in Canadian football history that year. Despite starting fifteen games, McManus threw for only 2,869 yards, snapping his record streak of consecutive 4,000-yard seasons at eight. McManus might have been hurt by the loss of preferred target Darren Flutie to retirement. The Tiger-Cats finished 1–17, with their lone win being an overtime victory over the Saskatchewan Roughriders.

2004 was significantly stronger for McManus, as was his team. For the second time in his career, McManus threw for over 5,000 yards despite turning 39 early in the season. The Tiger-Cats shocked the Canadian football world by finishing 9–8–1, an accomplishment amazing enough for rookie head coach Greg Marshall to be named coach of the year and McManus to receive the Rogers-AT&T Fan Choice Award, sharing it with Anthony Calvillo. McManus became the third player in CFL history to reach 50,000 passing yards. In Hamilton's sole playoff game, they lost the East Semi-Final to rivals Toronto 24–6.

The Tiger-Cats were unable to build on their 2004 success, and in the 2005 season finished in the league's basement at 5–13, with a defense that allowed 583 points. McManus threw for 2,544 yards and eleven touchdowns with a quarterback rating of 67.1, and spent time on the bench in favor of Khari Jones, Marcus Brady, and the unknown Kevin Eakin who all took snaps.

=== Final season and retirement ===
After the 93rd Grey Cup, McManus was traded to the newly crowned league champion Edmonton Eskimos in a package that included as the centerpiece Edmonton quarterback Jason Maas. This was the first time McManus had ever been traded in his career and his second go-round with Edmonton. On March 31, 2006, McManus was traded for the second time in his career, this time to the Calgary Stampeders. Edmonton received a third round draft pick in the 2006 CFL draft in return. For the 2006 season, he served as backup and mentor to Stampeders' starting quarterback Henry Burris. He announced his retirement from playing football on April 2, 2007. He was quickly snapped up by TSN as an analyst for CFL game broadcasts for the 2007 season. He was inducted into the Canadian Football Hall of Fame in 2011.

McManus is first in Hamilton Tiger-Cats franchise history in career passing yards (33,841), pass attempts (4,257), completions (2,368) and touchdown passes (164). second in Tiger-Cats history in passing yards in a single game (525), fourth all-time in CFL career passing yards (53,255).

== Coaching career ==
McManus began working as a guest coach with the Tiger-Cats during 2008 CFL season training camp and signed on as a coaching consultant in July to assist offensive coordinator Marcel Bellefeuille and work with the quarterbacks.

== Front office career ==
McManus served as a scout for the Hamilton Tiger-Cats from 2009 to 2013 and eventually became the team's head U.S. scout.

On December 2, 2013, it was announced that McManus has been hired as the assistant general manager and director of U.S. scouting for the Winnipeg Blue Bombers. He was hired by his former Tiger-Cats teammate, Kyle Walters, who was Winnipeg Blue Bomber's general manager.

== Legacy ==
In 2012, and in honor of the 100th Grey Cup, Canada Post used his image on a series of commemorative postage stamps. The image was also used on presentation posters and other materials to promote the Grey Cup game and other celebrations associated with the centennial.

== See also ==
- List of gridiron football quarterbacks passing statistics
