= 2007 CFL season =

Canadian Football League season

- Duration: June 28 – November 3, 2007
- East champions: Winnipeg Blue Bombers
- West champions: Saskatchewan Roughriders

95th Grey Cup
- Date: November 25, 2007
- Venue: Rogers Centre, Toronto

CFL seasons
- ← 2006 2008 →

Canadian Football League team locations: West, East

The 2007 CFL season was the 54th season of modern-day Canadian football, the 50th season of the Canadian Football League, and many special events were held to commemorate the event. Regular-season play began on June 28 at the Rogers Centre in Toronto, Ontario and concluded on November 3. The playoffs began on November 11 and ended with the championship game, the 95th Grey Cup, at the Rogers Centre in Toronto, on November 25, 2007, with the Saskatchewan Roughriders as champions.

== CFL news in 2007 ==
=== Schedule ===
On February 14, 2007, the CFL announced the game schedule for the 2007 season, introducing a 19-week schedule that included 18 regular-season games and one bye week for each team. Bye weeks were taken consecutively by each division beginning with the East in Week 8, creating two weeks of divisional rivalry games.

The year's regular-season schedule kicked off on Canada Day weekend and included the CFL's annual traditional rivalries — highlighted by the Labour Day and Thanksgiving Classics. The Canadian Football Hall of Fame game returned to Ivor Wynne Stadium on induction weekend and featured the Winnipeg Blue Bombers and the Hamilton Tiger-Cats on September 15.

The regular-season concluded with a triple-header on Saturday, November 3, as teams finalized post-season positioning before the Division Semi-Finals began eight days later on Sunday, November 11. The CFL's Division Championships qualified the season's two Grey Cup competing teams one week later on November 18. The 2007 season officially concluded with the 95th Grey Cup on Sunday, November 25, returning to Toronto for the first time since 1992.

=== Television ===
On February 28, 2007, the CFL announced details of the 2007 broadcast schedule which included all 77 games broadcast across the country by partners TSN, CBC or RDS.

The year's regular season schedule saw 50 games aired on TSN, which were also carried live on TSN Broadband, 22 games on CBC and a minimum of 16 Montreal Alouettes' games on RDS. Coverage of the entire post-season, including the 95th Grey Cup in Toronto, Ontario, returned to CBC and RDS in the fall. The 2007 season would be the CBC's final season as a CFL broadcaster for the foreseeable future, as the CFL and TSN began an exclusive deal with the 2008 CFL season. It would also be the last CFL season to be carried on any over-the-air broadcaster for 17 years, as it would not be until 2024 that TSN—which had repeatedly renewed its exclusive deal with the CFL multiple times after its initial 5-year term—sub-licensed any CFL content to sister network CTV.

TSN's 50-game CFL broadcast schedule became available for the first time ever on multiple TSN distribution platforms. All 50 games aired live on TSN and TSN Broadband, with a minimum of 35 broadcasts produced and televised in High Definition on TSN HD. The majority of HD telecasts aired Friday nights during the 11th season of Wendy's Friday Night Football.

TSN's broadcast schedule got underway on June 28 with a season opening double-header featuring BC at Toronto followed by Winnipeg at Edmonton. Additional highlights included two Grey Cup rematches featuring Montreal vs. BC (Aug. 31 and Sept. 9), the traditional Labour Day Classic Weekend with Winnipeg at Saskatchewan (Sept. 2) and the Hall of Fame Game featuring Winnipeg at Hamilton (Sept. 15).

The first of 22 CFL on CBC regular-season games aired on Saturday, June 30 when the Hamilton Tiger-Cats played the Calgary Stampeders at McMahon Stadium. CBC's regular-season line-up featured the first-ever CFL on CBC triple-header as well as the traditional double-headers, the Labour Day and Thanksgiving Day Classics.

=== League Attendance ===
The CFL's average attendance for 2007 was 29,167, which is the highest average since the 1983 CFL season.

=== CFL in Ottawa ===
The Ottawa franchise did not play in the 2007 season. The CFL indicated that there was not enough time for a potential new owner to get the franchise up and running until 2009 at the earliest.

=== Salary Management System ===
2007 was the first year the new salary cap and salary management system was enforced. The cap was set at $4.05 million and it demonstrated its successful implementation as six clubs were under the salary expenditure cap while two teams exceeded and were penalized. The Saskatchewan Roughriders were fined, as were the Montreal Alouettes, who also lost a first round draft pick at the 2008 CFL Canadian Draft.

=== New Commissioner ===
On March 12, 2007, Mark Cohon was named the CFL's 12th commissioner. The son of McDonald's of Canada founder George Cohon succeeded Tom Wright. Born in Chicago, Illinois, Cohon moved to Toronto, Ontario when he was two years old. Cohon is a graduate of Chicago's Northwestern University with a Bachelor of Science with a major in communication studies and was a business consultant to environmental and youth organizations in Toronto before becoming president and chief executive officer of AudienceView Ticketing, a company which sells ticketing systems and services to sports, arts and entertainment events. In 2006, he was appointed new chair of the Ontario Science Centre. He was appointed to the board of trustees in 2003.

=== Rule Changes ===
==== The "Ricky Williams Rule" ====
Outgoing CFL commissioner Tom Wright, stated that a rule will be introduced before the start of next season that would prevent a player under suspension in the National Football League from signing with a CFL club. Some columnists dubbed this "The Ricky Williams Rule" because the running back joined the Toronto Argonauts after the NFL suspended him for the 2006 season for failing its substance abuse program for the fourth time.

==== Illegal Movement ====
This rule will penalize offensive linemen 5 yards for abrupt snap down into 2 or 3 point stance. This rule is aimed at eliminating a tactic by offensive linemen, solely designed to draw the defence offside.

==== Kick from Scrimmage ====
On a kick from scrimmage going out of bounds in flight between the 20-yard lines, the receiving team will have the option of taking possession at the point the ball went out of bounds in flight, or having a 10-yard penalty applied against the kicking team at the point of the last scrimmage, with the down repeated. This forces the kicking team on punts and field goal attempts to land the ball in the field of play.

==== Unnecessary roughness ====
- Any player in possession of the ball, who falls to the ground without contact and is not attempting to advance the ball, may only be touched down and may not be contacted in any other manner. Players on the ground are in an extremely vulnerable position and should be protected from excessive contact.
- Horse-collar tackles will be penalized.
- Contact above the shoulders on the long snapper will be penalized.

==== Roughing the Passer ====
- Contact below a quarterback's knees will no longer be accepted.
- Defensive players may no longer lead with the head or use the head as the primary contact point to hit a passer. Ducking the head and launching at a passer is not acceptable. In the 2006 season, Spergon Wynn was the victim of such a hit at the hands of Scott Schultz. There was no penalty on the play, although Schultz was subsequently fined.

==== Blocking on Kick Returns ====
Players on the return team will once again be allowed to block oncoming tacklers from the sides. This was the rule until 2006, when the CFL outlawed blocks on the back of the side, leading to the temporary demise of the kick return touchdown. In 2006, there were only three touchdowns from kick returns, compared to eighteen in 2005. In addition to fewer touchdowns being scored, shorter kick returns lead to offences having to cover a larger portion of the field to score a touchdown, leading to more field goals and fewer touchdowns. With the long kick returns coming back in 2007, it was expected that games would be higher scoring and more exciting.

=== Records and Milestones ===
Winnipeg Blue Bombers slotback, Milt Stegall passed Mike Pringle and George Reed for the most career touchdowns with 137 on July 27. By the end of the season he had 144 career touchdowns and, with 14,695 career receiving yards, was trying to pass Allen Pitts all-time league record of 14,891 receiving yards.

Toronto Argonauts slotback, Derrell Mitchell surpassed Paul Masotti as the franchise's all-time leading receiver on July 26.

Winnipeg Blue Bombers running back, Charles Roberts passed Leo Lewis to become the franchise's all-time leading rusher on September 2.

BC running back, Joe Smith broke former Lion great Cory Philpot's franchise single season rushing record on October 28.

== Regular season ==
West Division
Pos	Team	Pld	W	L	T	PF	PA	PD	Pts
1	BC Lions (C, Q)	18	14	3	1	542	379	+163	29
2	Saskatchewan Roughriders (Q)	18	12	6	0	530	432	+98	24
3	Calgary Stampeders (Q)	18	7	10	1	473	527	−54	15
4	Edmonton Eskimos	18	5	12	1	399	509	−110	11

Source: "2007 Regular Season Standings". Canadian Football League. Archived from the original on September 21, 2008.
(C) First round bye; (Q) Qualified for playoffs

East Division
Pos	Team	Pld	W	L	T	PF	PA	PD	Pts
1	Toronto Argonauts (C, Q)	18	11	7	0	440	336	+104	22
2	Winnipeg Blue Bombers (Q)	18	10	7	1	439	404	+35	21
3	Montreal Alouettes (Q)	18	8	10	0	398	433	−35	16
4	Hamilton Tiger-Cats	18	3	15	0	315	514	−199	6

Source: "2007 Regular Season Standings". Canadian Football League. Archived from the original on September 21, 2008.
(C) First round bye; (Q) Qualified for playoffs

== Grey Cup Playoffs ==
The Saskatchewan Roughriders are the 2007 Grey Cup Champions, defeating the Winnipeg Blue Bombers 23–19 at Toronto's Rogers Centre. It was the first Grey Cup for the Roughriders since they won it in 1989, ending an 18-year drought. The Roughriders' James Johnson (DB) was named the Grey Cup's Most Valuable Player and Andy Fantuz (SB) was named as the Grey Cup's Most Valuable Canadian.

=== Playoff bracket ===
November 11: Division Semifinals
East
E3	Montreal Alouettes	22
E2	Winnipeg Blue Bombers	24
West
W3	Calgary Stampeders	24
W2	Saskatchewan Roughriders	26

November 18: Division Finals
E2	Winnipeg Blue Bombers	19
E1	Toronto Argonauts	9
W2	Saskatchewan Roughriders	26
W1	BC Lions	17

November 25: 95th Grey Cup; Rogers Centre – Toronto
E2	Winnipeg Blue Bombers	19
W2	Saskatchewan Roughriders	23

== CFL leaders ==
- CFL passing leaders
- CFL rushing leaders
- CFL receiving leaders

== 2007 CFL All-Stars ==
=== Offence ===
- QB – Kerry Joseph, Saskatchewan Roughriders
- WR – Derick Armstrong, Winnipeg Blue Bombers
- WR – Jason Clermont, BC Lions
- WR – Terrence Edwards, Winnipeg Blue Bombers
- WR – Geroy Simon, BC Lions
- RB – Charles Roberts, Winnipeg Blue Bombers
- RB – Joe Smith, BC Lions
- OT – Dan Goodspeed, Winnipeg Blue Bombers
- OT – Rob Murphy, BC Lions
- OG – Kelly Bates, BC Lions
- OG – Scott Flory, Montreal Alouettes
- C – Jeremy O'Day, Saskatchewan Roughriders

=== Defence ===
- DE – Jonathan Brown, Toronto Argonauts
- DE – Cameron Wake, BC Lions
- DT – Doug Brown, Winnipeg Blue Bombers
- DT – Tyrone Williams, BC Lions
- LB – Kevin Eiben, Toronto Argonauts
- LB – Zeke Moreno, Hamilton Tiger-Cats
- LB – Barrin Simpson, Winnipeg Blue Bombers
- DB – Ryan Phillips, BC Lions
- DB – Kenny Wheaton, Toronto Argonauts
- CB – Byron Parker, Toronto Argonauts
- CB – Jordan Younger, Toronto Argonauts
- DS – Orlondo Steinauer, Toronto Argonauts

=== Special teams ===
- K – Nick Setta, Hamilton Tiger-Cats
- P – Damon Duval, Montreal Alouettes
- ST – Ian Smart, BC Lions

== 2007 Western All-Stars ==
=== Offence ===
- QB – Kerry Joseph, Saskatchewan Roughriders
- WR – Jason Clermont, BC Lions
- WR – D.J. Flick, Saskatchewan Roughriders
- WR – Nik Lewis, Calgary Stampeders
- WR – Geroy Simon, BC Lions
- RB – Joffrey Reynolds, Calgary Stampeders
- RB – Joe Smith, BC Lions
- OT – Gene Makowsky, Saskatchewan Roughriders
- OT – Rob Murphy, BC Lions
- OG – Kelly Bates, BC Lions
- OG – Jay McNeil, Calgary Stampeders
- C – Jeremy O'Day, Saskatchewan Roughriders

=== Defence ===
- DE – Fred Perry, Saskatchewan Roughriders
- DE – Cameron Wake, BC Lions
- DT – Aaron Hunt, BC Lions
- DT – Tyrone Williams, BC Lions
- LB – Otis Floyd, BC Lions
- LB – Reggie Hunt, Saskatchewan Roughriders
- LB – Maurice Lloyd, Saskatchewan Roughriders
- DB – Korey Banks, BC Lions
- DB – Ryan Phillips, BC Lions
- CB – Lavar Glover, BC Lions
- CB – James Johnson, Saskatchewan Roughriders
- DS – Barron Miles, BC Lions

=== Special teams ===
- K – Sandro DeAngelis, Calgary Stampeders
- P – Paul McCallum, BC Lions
- ST – Ian Smart, BC Lions

== 2007 Eastern All-Stars ==
=== Offence ===
- QB – Kevin Glenn, Winnipeg Blue Bombers
- WR – Derick Armstrong, Winnipeg Blue Bombers
- WR – Ben Cahoon, Montreal Alouettes
- WR – Terrence Edwards, Winnipeg Blue Bombers
- WR – Milt Stegall, Winnipeg Blue Bombers
- RB – Jesse Lumsden, Hamilton Tiger-Cats
- RB – Charles Roberts, Winnipeg Blue Bombers
- OT – Alexandre Gauthier, Winnipeg Blue Bombers
- OT – Dan Goodspeed, Winnipeg Blue Bombers
- OG – Scott Flory, Montreal Alouettes
- OG – Taylor Robertson, Toronto Argonauts
- C – Marwan Hage, Hamilton Tiger-Cats

=== Defence ===
- DE – Jonathan Brown, Toronto Argonauts
- DE – Tom Canada, Winnipeg Blue Bombers
- DT – Adriano Belli, Toronto Argonauts
- DT – Doug Brown, Winnipeg Blue Bombers
- LB – Kevin Eiben, Toronto Argonauts
- LB – Zeke Moreno, Hamilton Tiger-Cats
- LB – Barrin Simpson, Winnipeg Blue Bombers
- DB – Randee Drew, Montreal Alouettes
- DB – Kenny Wheaton, Toronto Argonauts
- CB – Byron Parker, Toronto Argonauts
- CB – Jordan Younger, Toronto Argonauts
- DS – Orlondo Steinauer, Toronto Argonauts

=== Special teams ===
- K – Nick Setta, Hamilton Tiger-Cats
- P – Damon Duval, Montreal Alouettes
- ST – Dominique Dorsey, Toronto Argonauts

== 2007 Intergold CFLPA All-Stars ==
=== Offence ===
- QB – Kevin Glenn, Winnipeg Blue Bombers
- OT – Dan Goodspeed, Winnipeg Blue Bombers
- OT – Patrick Kabongo, Edmonton Eskimos
- OG – Andrew Greene, Winnipeg Blue Bombers
- OG – Scott Flory, Montreal Alouettes
- C – Marwan Hage, Hamilton Tiger-Cats
- RB – Charles Roberts, Winnipeg Blue Bombers
- FB – Chris Szarka, Saskatchewan Roughriders
- SB – Terrence Edwards, Winnipeg Blue Bombers
- SB – Milt Stegall, Winnipeg Blue Bombers
- WR – Derick Armstrong, Winnipeg Blue Bombers
- WR – Kamau Peterson, Edmonton Eskimos

=== Defence ===
- DE – Jonathan Brown, Toronto Argonauts
- DE – Cameron Wake, BC Lions
- DT – Doug Brown, Winnipeg Blue Bombers
- DT – Adriano Belli, Toronto Argonauts
- LB – Barrin Simpson, Winnipeg Blue Bombers
- LB – Zeke Moreno, Hamilton Tiger-Cats
- LB – JoJuan Armour, Hamilton Tiger-Cats
- CB – Byron Parker, Toronto Argonauts
- CB – Jordan Younger, Toronto Argonauts
- HB – Korey Banks, BC Lions
- HB – Ryan Phillips, BC Lions
- S – Barron Miles, BC Lions

=== Special teams ===
- K – Nick Setta, Hamilton Tiger-Cats
- ST – Dominique Dorsey, Toronto Argonauts
- P – Damon Duval, Montreal Alouettes

=== Head coach ===
- Kent Austin, Saskatchewan Roughriders

== 2007 Rogers CFL Awards ==
- CFL's Most Outstanding Player Award – Kerry Joseph (QB), Saskatchewan Roughriders
- CFL's Most Outstanding Canadian Award – Jason Clermont (SB), BC Lions
- CFL's Most Outstanding Defensive Player Award – Cameron Wake (DE), BC Lions
- CFL's Most Outstanding Offensive Lineman Award – Rob Murphy (OG), BC Lions
- CFL's Most Outstanding Rookie Award – Cameron Wake (DE), BC Lions
- CFL's Most Outstanding Special Teams Award – Ian Smart (RB), BC Lions
- CFLPA's Outstanding Community Service Award – Milt Stegall (SB), Winnipeg Blue Bombers
- Rogers Fans' Choice Award – Charles Roberts (RB), Winnipeg Blue Bombers
- CFL's Scotiabank Coach of the Year – Kent Austin, Saskatchewan Roughriders
- Commissioner's Award – Keith Pelley, Toronto
- Hugh Campbell Distinguished Leadership Award - Bob Ackles, BC Lions
