= Fred Perry (Canadian football) =

American gridiron football player (born 1975)

Profile
- Position: Defensive end

Personal information
- Born: January 5, 1975 (age 51); Fort Smith, Arkansas, U.S.
- Listed height: 6 ft 1 in (1.85 m)
- Listed weight: 240 lb (109 kg)

Career information
- College: Southern Arkansas

Career history
- 1999–2000: Toronto Argonauts
- 2001: Edmonton Eskimos
- 2001: Birmingham Thunderbolts
- 2002: Atlanta Falcons*
- 2003: Ottawa Renegades
- 2004: Calgary Stampeders
- 2005–2007: Saskatchewan Roughriders
- 2008: Edmonton Eskimos
- 2009: Winnipeg Blue Bombers
- * Offseason or practice squad member only

Awards and highlights
- Grey Cup champion (2007); 2× CFL All-Star (2006, 2007); 2× CFL West All-Star (2006, 2007)
- Stats at CFL.ca

Fred Perry (born January 5, 1975) is an American former professional football defensive end.

== College career ==
Perry attended Southern Arkansas University and played two seasons of football. As a senior, he helped in leading his team to the 1997 Gulf South Conference Championship and was named an NCAA Division II All-American. He previously attended Northeastern Oklahoma College.

== Professional career ==
The bulk of Perry's playing career has been in the CFL, though he spent the entire 2002 season on the injured reserve of the NFL's Atlanta Falcons after being injured in an exhibition game.

In 2006, Perry was second in the CFL in quarterback sacks and was named to the CFL All-Star team. He repeated as an All-Star in 2007 and won the 95th Grey Cup with the Saskatchewan Roughriders.

On February 8, 2008, he was traded, along with Saskatchewan's 2008 2nd round CFL Draft choice, to the Edmonton Eskimos. In exchange, the Riders received Steven Jyles and Edmonton's 2008 2nd round draft choice. It was reported that, after re-signing with the Roughriders shortly after the Grey Cup, Perry had repeatedly asked for a signing bonus or cash advance that general manager Eric Tillman could not provide for salary cap reasons.

In 2008, Perry saw action in only seven games with the Eskimos, managing just one sack.

On May 15, 2009, Perry was traded from the Edmonton Eskimos to the Winnipeg Blue Bombers for DB Kelly Malveaux. Perry's success with the Blue Bombers was limited due to injury. On March 19, 2010, he was released by the Winnipeg.
