= Rogers Fans' Choice Award =

The Rogers Fans' Choice Award was annually awarded to the player who received the most votes from fans as the Rogers Player of the Game, during the 4th quarter of Canadian Football League (CFL) games on The Sports Network (TSN), between 2003 and 2007.

Fans used their Rogers Wireless phones or the CFL's web site to vote for their player. In 2008, Rogers decided to no longer be a sponsor for the CFL when it started to make attempts to obtain a National Football League (NFL) franchise in Toronto. The Rogers Fans' Choice Awards ceased to exist after the 2007 season.

== Rogers Fans' Choice Award winners ==
- 2007 – Charles Roberts (RB), Winnipeg Blue Bombers
- 2006 – Geroy Simon (SB), BC Lions
- 2005 – Damon Allen (QB), Toronto Argonauts
- 2004 – Danny McManus (QB), Hamilton Tiger-Cats / Anthony Calvillo (QB), Montreal Alouettes
- 2003 – Ricky Ray (QB), Edmonton Eskimos
