= Charles Roberts (Canadian football) =

American gridiron football player (born 1979)

Profile
- Position: Running back

Personal information
- Born: April 3, 1979 (age 47); Montclair, California, U.S.
- Listed height: 5 ft 6 in (1.68 m)
- Listed weight: 177 lb (80 kg)

Career information
- College: Sacramento State

Career history
- 2001–2008: Winnipeg Blue Bombers
- 2008: BC Lions

Awards and highlights
- 7× CFL All-Star (2001–2007); 3× CFL East All-Star (2001, 2006, 2007); 4× CFL West All-Star (2002–2005); 3× CFL rushing yards leader (2003, 2005, 2006); 3× Eddie James Memorial Trophy (2003–2005); Frank M. Gibson Trophy (2001); Rogers Fans' Choice Award (2007); Winnipeg career rushing leader (9,987 yards); Winnipeg Blue Bombers Ring of Honour
- Stats at CFL.ca (archive)
- Canadian Football Hall of Fame (Class of 2014)

Charles Roberts (born April 3, 1979) is an American former professional football running back who played for the Winnipeg Blue Bombers and BC Lions of the Canadian Football League (CFL). In 2024, he was inducted into the Winnipeg Blue Bombers Ring of Honour.

== College career ==
Roberts attended Sacramento State, where he set numerous DI-AA rushing records for the Sac State Hornets football team, including total rushing yards and most yards in a game (409 yards vs Idaho State in 1999). His nickname while with the Hornets was "Choo-Choo Charlie", in reference to the train that would often come by behind the stadium during games and practices. Upon graduation, he went to Winnipeg, Manitoba, Canada to play for the Canadian Football League team, the Winnipeg Blue Bombers.

== Professional career ==
=== Winnipeg Blue Bombers ===
In his 8-year tenure, he established himself as a successful running back in the Canadian Football League, earning the nickname "Blink" for his quickness and agility. He led the league in rushing yards in 2006 with 1609 yards and 10 touchdowns, earning a nomination as the East's Most Outstanding Player. Off the field, he experienced highs and lows. The enigmatic back missed team flights, led the league in all-purpose yards, pondered retirement, led the league in rushing yards, publicly criticized some decisions, and signed a long-term big money deal to remain as the face of the Bombers.

Through the 2006 season, Roberts rushed for 8,091 yards in just six seasons with the Blue Bombers. He also tallied up 2,732 receiving yards and 57 touchdowns.

On September 2, 2007, Roberts passed Leo Lewis to become the Winnipeg Blue Bombers all-time leading rusher. At the time, he was fifth all-time in CFL career rushing totals. Andrew Harris surpassed Charles Roberts for fifth during the CFL's 2023 rendition of the "Touchdown Atlantic" (TDA), an event which only had been played once during the CFL preseason in 2005 when Roberts was still playing.

Roberts was selected in 2005 as one of the 20 All-Time Blue Bomber Greats.

On September 1, 2008, Roberts was traded to the BC Lions for fellow RB Joe Smith.

=== BC Lions ===
On September 13, 2008, in a game against the Roughriders, Roberts ran to surpass 10,000 rushing yards in his CFL career.

On December 3, 2008, the Lions announced that Roberts' 2009 option was not being renewed and as a result he became a free agent. He retired from the game shortly thereafter.

== Post-football ==
Since retiring as a player, Roberts moved to and now resides in Long Beach, California.

On September 18, 2013, Roberts was inducted into the Blue Bombers' Hall of Fame.

In 2014, he was inducted into the Canadian Football Hall of Fame.

== CFL statistics ==
=== Regular season ===
Year	Team	Att.	Yards	Ave.	Long	TD	Fumbles	Rec.	Yards	Avg	Long	TD
2001	Winnipeg	107	620	5.8	22	1	3	27	288	10	43	0
2002	Winnipeg	216	1,162	5.4	70	5	5	55	613	11	59	6
2003	Winnipeg	264	1,554	5.9	51	8	2	51	548	10	47	2
2004	Winnipeg	300	1,522	5.1	49	8	11	53	398	7	26	5
2005	Winnipeg	290	1,624	5.6	69	12	5	49	474	9	32	0
2006	Winnipeg	303	1,609	5.3	33	10	5	42	411	9	32	0
2007	Winnipeg	246	1,379	5.3	56	16	6	47	358	7	35	0
2008	Winnipeg	111	517	4.7	33	4		38	251	6.6	14	0
2008	British Columbia	65	298	4.6	18	5		6	55	9.2	20	0
Totals	TOT	1918	10285	5.4	70	69	41	368	3396	9	64	13

=== Playoffs ===
Playoffs	Team	GP	Rush	Yards	TD	Rec.	Yards	TD
2001 East Final	Winnipeg	1	9	49	0	4	33	0
2002 West Semi-Final	Winnipeg	1	16	169	1	2	14	0
2002 West Final	Winnipeg	1	1	−1	0	0	–	–
2003 West Semi-Final	Winnipeg	1	16	73	0	4	32	0
2006 East Semi-Final	Winnipeg	1	30	179	2	0	–	–
2007 East Semi-Final	Winnipeg	1	20	107	1	2	17	0
2007 East Final	Winnipeg	1	25	105	0	1	8	0
2008 West Semi-Final	British Columbia	0	–	–	–	–	–	–
2008 West Final	British Columbia	0	–	–	–	–	–	–
Totals		7	117	681	4	13	104	0

=== Grey Cup ===
Grey Cup	Team	GP	Rush	Yards	TD	Rec.	Yards	TD
2001	Winnipeg	1	8	70	0	0	–	–
2007	Winnipeg	1	13	47	0	2	8	0
Totals		2	21	117	0	2	8	0
