= Joe Smith (running back) =

American gridiron football player (born 1979)

No. 33
- Position: Running back

Personal information
- Born: August 26, 1979 (age 47); Monroe, Louisiana, U.S.

Career information
- College: Louisiana Tech

Career history
- 2003: Jacksonville Jaguars*
- 2004: Tampa Bay Buccaneers*
- 2004: New Orleans Saints*
- 2005: Tennessee Titans*
- 2005: Rhein Fire
- 2006–2008: BC Lions
- 2008: Winnipeg Blue Bombers
- * Offseason or practice squad member only

Awards and highlights
- Grey Cup champion (2006); Eddie James Memorial Trophy (2007); CFL All-Star (2007); CFL West All-Star (2007)

Joseph O'Brien Smith (born August 26, 1979) is an American former professional running back in the Canadian Football League (CFL). In 2007, in only his second season with the team, he became the BC Lions' all-time single-season rushing leader, rushing for a record 1,510 yards.

== College career ==
Born in Monroe, Louisiana, Smith's hometown is Cleveland, Texas. He played collegiately as a running back at Louisiana Tech University for two years following his transfer from the New Mexico Military Institute. At Louisiana Tech, he rushed for 2,189 yards and added 450 receiving yards to go along with 25 touchdowns. As a senior, he was selected in the first-team All-Western Athletic Conference team and was named the offensive Most Valuable Player. Smith graduated from Louisiana Tech with a bachelor's degree in sociology.

== Professional career ==
=== NFL career ===
Following his graduation from Louisiana Tech, Smith began his professional football career in 2003 as a free agent running back with the Jacksonville Jaguars. However, he was cut after spending 15 weeks on the practice squad.

In 2005, following his release from Jacksonville and a one-week stint with the Tampa Bay Buccaneers, Smith signed with the Tennessee Titans and was allocated to the Rhein Fire of NFL Europa where he became the team's starting running back.

=== CFL career (BC Lions & Winnipeg Blue Bombers) ===
Smith signed as a free agent with the BC Lions in May, 2006, and replaced Antonio Warren as their starting running back when Warren was released in July. In 14 games with the Lions during the 2006 season, Smith rushed 166 times for 887 yards and 9 touchdowns with only 2 fumbles and caught 51 passes for 420 yards and one touchdown.

Smith rushed for 116 yards on 9 carries in the 2006 Grey Cup game, which the Lions won over the Montreal Alouettes by a score of 25–14.

During the 2007 CFL season, Smith broke former Lion great Cory Philpot's single season rushing record with 1,510 yards, coming in an October 28 game against the Hamilton Tiger-Cats.

Smith finished the 2007 season as the CFL's rushing and rushing touchdowns leader (with 1,510 yards and 18 touchdowns, respectively), was named a CFL All-Star for the first time, and won the Western Division's Eddie James Memorial Trophy (as the Western Division's leading rusher).

On September 1, 2008, Smith was traded to the Winnipeg Blue Bombers for RB Charles Roberts.

He was released by Winnipeg on June 25, 2009.

== Statistics ==
Year	Team	Att.	Yards	Ave.	Long	TD
2005	Rhein Fire	191	894	4.7	59	4
2006	BC Lions	166	887	5.3	66	9
2007	BC Lions	281	1,510	5.4	38	18
2008	BC Lions	55	236	4.3	22	3
2008	Winnipeg Blue Bombers	69	381	5.5	31	2
Totals	CFL	571	3,014	5.5	66	32
