= Carl Kidd =

American gridiron football player (born 1973)

No. 46, 26
- Position: Linebacker

Personal information
- Born: June 14, 1973 (age 53); Pine Bluff, Arkansas, U.S.
- Listed height: 6 ft 1 in (1.85 m)
- Listed weight: 230 lb (104 kg)

Career information
- High school: Dollarway (Pine Bluff)
- College: Arkansas
- NFL draft: 1995: undrafted

Career history
- Oakland Raiders (1995–1996); Denver Broncos (1998)*; Kansas City Chiefs (1999)*; Minnesota Vikings (2000)*; B.C. Lions (2000); Minnesota Vikings (2001)*; B.C. Lions (2001–2006)
- * Offseason or practice squad member only

Awards and highlights
- 2× Grey Cup champion (2000, 2006); 2× CFL West All-Star (2002, 2006)
- Stats at Pro Football Reference

Carl Edward Kidd (born June 10, 1973) is an American former professional football linebacker and defensive back who played in both the National Football League (NFL) and the Canadian Football League (CFL). He played college football for the Arkansas Razorbacks and was signed by the Oakland Raiders as an undrafted free agent.

== Early life and college ==
Kidd played high school football at Dollarway High School in Pine Bluff, Arkansas, and then played at Northeastern Oklahoma A&M College. Kidd later played cornerback and safety at the University of Arkansas, lettering in 1993 and 1994. As a senior Kidd led the team in punt returns and won the Steve Little Award for the top Razorback special teams player. Following his senior season, Kidd was selected to play in the Blue-Gray Classic all-star game in Montgomery, Alabama.

== Professional career ==
=== Oakland Raiders ===
Kidd was signed as a free agent by the Oakland Raiders after not being taken in the 1995 NFL draft. He played a combined 29 games for the Oakland Raiders in 1995 and 1996. Kidd played in all sixteen games for the Raiders in 1996, grabbing the only interception in his NFL career and returning 29 kickoffs for 622 yards. Kidd then spent 3 years in various NFL camps before being signed as a free agent with the BC Lions in 2000.

=== CFL career ===
In 2002, Kidd was one of six Lions to be selected to the CFL Western All-Star team. He returned 2 interceptions for touchdowns and was named BC's top defensive player and Player of the Week for week #14.

In 2003, he was named Defensive Player of the Week for week 8, was 6th in the CFL with 87 total tackle (football move)s and returned 2 interceptions for touchdowns.

In 2004, he recorded his 5th career touchdown, which was a 35-yard interception return versus the Hamilton Tiger-Cats. Kidd was also the Lions leader with 54 defensive tackles.

In 2005, he missed the first 2 games due to injury but still led the Lions in special teams tackles (23) and had 2 sacks.

In 2006, he had 66 total tackles and 4 sacks with the Lions to help them win the 2006 Grey Cup. In what would be his final game, Kidd teamed with Javier Glatt to cause a critical fumble that sealed the Grey Cup title for the Lions.

On March 27, 2007, Kidd announced his retirement from professional football at age 33.
