= Tyrone Williams (defensive tackle) =

American football player (born 1972)

No. 90, 95, 96
- Position: Defensive tackle

Personal information
- Born: October 22, 1972 (age 54); Philadelphia, Pennsylvania, U.S.
- Listed height: 6 ft 4 in (1.93 m)
- Listed weight: 296 lb (134 kg)

Career information
- College: Wyoming

Career history
- 1995: Arizona Rattlers
- 1996–1997: St. Louis Rams*
- 1997: Rhein Fire
- 1997: Chicago Bears*
- 1997: St. Louis Rams*
- 1997: Chicago Bears
- 1999: Rhein Fire
- 1999–2000: Philadelphia Eagles
- 2000: Kansas City Chiefs
- 2001: Washington Redskins
- 2001: Kansas City Chiefs
- 2002–2008: BC Lions
- 2009: Winnipeg Blue Bombers
- * Offseason or practice squad member only

Awards and highlights
- Grey Cup champion (94th); 2× CFL All-Star (2006, 2007); 2× CFL West All-Star (2006, 2007)

Career NFL statistics
- Total tackles: 28
- Sacks: 4.5
- Forced fumbles: 1
- Fumble recoveries: 1
- Stats at Pro Football Reference
- Stats at CFL.ca

Tyrone M. Williams Jr. (born October 22, 1972) is an American former professional football player who was a defensive tackle in the National Football League (NFL) and Canadian Football League (CFL). He was signed by the Chicago Bears as an undrafted free agent in 1997. He played college football for the Wyoming Cowboys.

Williams has also played for the Philadelphia Eagles, Kansas City Chiefs, Washington Redskins, BC Lions and Winnipeg Blue Bombers. He was a two-time Western Division All-Star and won the 94th Grey Cup with the Lions.
