= Otis Floyd =

American gridiron football player (born 1976)

No. 35
- Position: Linebacker

Personal information
- Born: June 13, 1976 (age 50); Detroit, Michigan, U.S.
- Listed height: 6 ft 2 in (1.88 m)
- Listed weight: 238 lb (108 kg)

Career information
- College: Louisville

Career history
- 2000: Edmonton Eskimos
- 2001: San Francisco Demons
- 2001–2003: Calgary Stampeders
- 2004–2008: BC Lions
- 2009–2010: Hamilton Tiger-Cats

Awards and highlights
- 2× Grey Cup champion (2001, 2006); CFL All-Star (2006 ); CFL East All-Star (2009); 3× CFL West All-Star (2005, 2006, 2007)
- Stats at CFL.ca (archive)

Otis Floyd (born June 13, 1976) is an American former professional football linebacker. He most recently played for the Hamilton Tiger-Cats of the Canadian Football League (CFL).

== College career ==
Floyd played five seasons for the University of Louisville.

== Professional career ==
Floyd won a Grey Cup championship in 2001 with the Calgary Stampeders, and then in 2006 with the BC Lions.

== Personal life ==
Floyd owns a roofing company called Paramount Roofing & Consulting, Inc. in Douglasville, Georgia.
