= Javier Glatt =

Canadian gridiron football player (born 1981)

No. 6
- Position: Linebacker

Personal information
- Born: October 10, 1981 (age 45); Calgary, Alberta, Canada
- Listed height: 6 ft 0 in (1.83 m)
- Listed weight: 225 lb (102 kg)

Career information
- University: UBC
- CFL draft: 2003: 2nd round, 15th overall pick

Career history
- 2003–2009: BC Lions
- 2010: Edmonton Eskimos

Awards and highlights
- Grey Cup champion (2006); CFL West All-Star (2008)
- Stats at CFL.ca

Javier Glatt (born October 10, 1981) is a Canadian former professional football linebacker who played for eight seasons in the Canadian Football League (CFL). He spent one season with the Edmonton Eskimos, but spent seven years with the BC Lions and won a Grey Cup championship with the team in 2006.

== College career ==
At UBC, he was the Canadian West Conference Defensive Player of the Year in 2002, and a three-time CIS All-Canadian as a UBC Thunderbird. Glatt also played baseball for University of British Columbia in their early 2000-2001 stages, and was a teammate of Mark Zamjoc, Derran Watts, Jeff Francis and UBC baseball assistant coach (currently, was a former player) Cav Whitely.

== Professional career ==
=== BC Lions ===
Glatt was drafted 15th overall, in the second round, in the 2003 CFL draft by the BC Lions. He spent three years as a backup before earning a position as the team's starting middle linebacker in 2006, while also helping the Lions win the 94th Grey Cup that year. In 2008, Glatt made his first CFL Divisional All-Star Team after finishing fourth in the CFL with 88 Defensive tackles along with six tackles for loss, two sacks, two interceptions, two forced fumbles, and two fumble recoveries. On August 4, 2009, Javier Glatt was moved to back up and special teams when the Lions signed free agent JoJuan Armour, the former starting linebacker for the Calgary Stampeders. On January 29, 2010, Glatt was released by the BC Lions.

=== Edmonton Eskimos ===
On February 10, 2010, Glatt signed with the Edmonton Eskimos. After one season as a backup with the Eskimos, Glatt retired from professional football on March 8, 2011.

Glatt played in a total of 143 CFL games recording 444 tackles, 14 sacks, and 11 Interceptions (including one he returned 56 yards for a touchdown) over his eight-year career (seven with the BC Lions and one with the Edmonton Eskimos).

== Post-playing career ==
Glatt went on to co-found CadMakers in 2014, a company that specializes in integrating advanced parametric design and construction technologies (such as automation, and prefabrication) with a focus on bringing manufacturing techniques into the construction industry.

== Personal life ==
Glatt is the younger brother of former CFL player J. P. Izquierdo.
