= 2006 CFL season =

Canadian Football League season

- Duration: June 16 – October 28, 2006
- East champions: Montreal Alouettes
- West champions: BC Lions

94th Grey Cup
- Date: November 19, 2006
- Venue: Canad Inns Stadium, Winnipeg
- Champions: BC Lions

CFL seasons
- ← 2005 2007 →

Canadian Football League team locations: West, East

The 2006 CFL season is considered to be the 53rd season in modern-day Canadian football, although it is officially the 49th Canadian Football League season.

== CFL news in 2006 ==
It was announced on April 9, 2006 that the CFL had suspended the operations of the Ottawa Renegades for the 2006 season, thus making the CFL an eight team league and moving the Winnipeg Blue Bombers to the East Division for at least the 2006 season. On April 12, 2006 an Ottawa Dispersal Draft was held where the remaining eight teams chose players from the Ottawa Renegades' roster. On September 28, it was confirmed that Ottawa would return no sooner than the 2008 season, to give potential new owners enough time to set up the new franchise.

Ultimately, the Renegades never returned. They would not be replaced until the formation of the Ottawa Redblacks, who began play for the 2014 CFL season.

The 2006 season is the first season where teams will be able to challenge officials' calls using instant replay. The CFL's replay system seems to be largely modelled on the one used in the NFL although there are some differences.

A new salary cap and salary management system (SMS) was adopted for the 2006 season, although the enforcement part of the new system will not take effect until the 2007 season. The cap for the 2007 season has been set at $4.05 million.

It was announced on July 5, 2006 that Tom Wright, commissioner of the CFL, had informed the CFL that he would not be seeking a contract extension as league commissioner after this season, thus ending his tenure as the 11th CFL commissioner. Prior to his final day in the office, Wright presented the Grey Cup to the BC Lions as they defeated the Montreal Alouettes in the championship game at Winnipeg's Canad Inns Stadium. Commissioner Wright and TSN President Phil King announced a landmark five-year multi-platform agreement between the League and TSN to commence in 2008 on December 20.

In June 2006 the league announced the launch of CFL Broadband, an internet streaming service designed to provide fans with another media platform, in addition to TSN and CBC broadcasts, to watch live CFL games.

On October 26, 2006, Hugh Campbell stepped down as CEO of the Eskimos.

The number of TDs scored on kicking or punting plays dropped dramatically in 2006, which many attributed to stricter rules on blocking. There were 16 such TDs in 2005, and just 3 in the 2006 season.

=== Records and Milestones ===
Damon Allen became pro-football's all-time passing yardage leader on September 4 by surpassing Warren Moon's total of 70,553 yards (in both the CFL and NFL combined) as the Toronto Argonauts defeated the Hamilton Tiger-Cats, 40–6.

Terry Vaughn became the all-time receptions leader, surpassing Darren Flutie with 973 on July 14. Then on September 22, Vaughn became the first football receiver in CFL history to record 1,000 all-time receptions.

On October 14, Byron Parker sets a new CFL single-season record for most interception return yardage with 342 on a 75-yard interception return for a touchdown in Edmonton.

On October 20, Mike O'Shea becomes the first Canadian and third player (behind Willie Pless and Alondra Johnson) to have had 1,000 career tackles.

The Edmonton Eskimos' streak of 34 straight years in the playoffs came to an end in 2006.

== Regular season ==
Note: GP = Games Played, W = Wins, L = Losses, T = Ties, PF = Points For, PA = Points Against, Pts = Points

Teams in bold finished in playoff positions.

West Division
| Pos | Team | Pld | W | L | T | PF | PA | PD | Pts |
|---|---|---|---|---|---|---|---|---|---|
| 1 | BC Lions (Q) | 18 | 13 | 5 | 0 | 555 | 355 | +200 | **26** |
| 2 | Calgary Stampeders (Q) | 18 | 10 | 8 | 0 | 477 | 426 | +51 | **20** |
| 3 | Saskatchewan Roughriders (Q) | 18 | 9 | 9 | 0 | 465 | 434 | +31 | **18** |
| 4 | Edmonton Eskimos | 18 | 7 | 11 | 0 | 399 | 468 | −69 | **14** |

Source: "2006 Regular Season Standings". Canadian Football League. Archived from the original on September 21, 2008.
(Q) Qualified for playoffs

East Division
| Pos | Team | Pld | W | L | T | PF | PA | PD | Pts |
|---|---|---|---|---|---|---|---|---|---|
| 1 | Montreal Alouettes (C, Q) | 18 | 10 | 8 | 0 | 451 | 431 | +20 | **20** |
| 2 | Toronto Argonauts (Q) | 18 | 10 | 8 | 0 | 359 | 343 | +16 | **20** |
| 3 | Winnipeg Blue Bombers (Q) | 18 | 9 | 9 | 0 | 362 | 408 | −46 | **18** |
| 4 | Hamilton Tiger-Cats | 18 | 4 | 14 | 0 | 292 | 495 | −203 | **8** |

Source: "2006 Regular Season Standings". Canadian Football League. Archived from the original on September 21, 2008.
(C) First round bye; (Q) Qualified for playoffs

=== Notes ===
- Ottawa Renegades have suspended operations for the 2006 season.
- Montreal finished ahead of Toronto by winning their head-to-head season series 2-1.

== Grey Cup playoffs ==
The BC Lions are the 2006 Grey Cup Champions, defeating the Montreal Alouettes 25–14 at Winnipeg's Canad Inns Stadium. It was the first Grey Cup for the Lions since they defeated the same Alouettes in the 88th Grey Cup game in 2000. The Lions' Dave Dickenson (QB) was named the Grey Cup's Most Valuable Player and the Lions' Paul McCallum (K) was the Grey Cup's Most Valuable Canadian.

=== Playoff bracket ===
November 5: Division Semifinals
East
E3 | Winnipeg Blue Bombers | 27
E2 | Toronto Argonauts | 31
West
W3 | Saskatchewan Roughriders | 30
W2 | Calgary Stampeders | 21

November 12: Division Finals
E2 | Toronto Argonauts | 24
E1 | Montreal Alouettes | 33
W3 | Saskatchewan Roughriders | 18
W1 | BC Lions | 45

November 19: 94th Grey Cup; Canad Inns Stadium – Winnipeg, MB
E1 | Montreal Alouettes | 14
W1 | BC Lions | 25

== CFL leaders ==
- CFL passing leaders
- CFL rushing leaders
- CFL receiving leaders

== 2006 CFL All-Stars ==
=== Offence ===
- QB – Ricky Ray, Edmonton Eskimos
- WR – Geroy Simon, BC Lions
- WR – Milt Stegall, Winnipeg Blue Bombers
- WR – Arland Bruce III, Toronto Argonauts
- WR – Jason Tucker, Edmonton Eskimos
- RB – Joffrey Reynolds, Calgary Stampeders
- RB – Charles Roberts, Winnipeg Blue Bombers
- OT – Gene Makowsky, Saskatchewan Roughriders
- OT – Rob Murphy, BC Lions
- OG – Scott Flory, Montreal Alouettes
- OG – Jay McNeil, Calgary Stampeders
- C – Jeremy O'Day, Saskatchewan Roughriders

=== Defence ===
- DE – Brent Johnson, BC Lions
- DE – Fred Perry, Saskatchewan Roughriders
- DT – Doug Brown, Winnipeg Blue Bombers
- DT – Tyrone Williams, BC Lions
- LB – Brian Clark, Calgary Stampeders
- LB – Otis Floyd, BC Lions
- LB – Barrin Simpson, Winnipeg Blue Bombers
- DB – Korey Banks, BC Lions
- DB – Eddie Davis, Saskatchewan Roughriders
- CB – Byron Parker, Toronto Argonauts
- CB – Coby Rhinehart, Calgary Stampeders
- DS – Barron Miles, BC Lions

=== Special teams ===
- K – Sandro DeAngelis, Calgary Stampeders
- P – Noel Prefontaine, Toronto Argonauts
- ST – Albert Johnson III, Winnipeg Blue Bombers

== 2006 Western All-Stars ==
=== Offence ===
- QB – Ricky Ray, Edmonton Eskimos
- WR – Geroy Simon, BC Lions
- WR – Matt Dominguez, Saskatchewan Roughriders
- WR – Nik Lewis, Calgary Stampeders
- WR – Jason Tucker, Edmonton Eskimos
- RB – Joffrey Reynolds, Calgary Stampeders
- RB – Kenton Keith, Saskatchewan Roughriders
- OT – Gene Makowsky, Saskatchewan Roughriders
- OT – Rob Murphy, BC Lions
- OG – Dan Comiskey, Edmonton Eskimos
- OG – Jay McNeil, Calgary Stampeders
- C – Jeremy O'Day, Saskatchewan Roughriders

=== Defence ===
- DE – Brent Johnson, BC Lions
- DE – Fred Perry, Saskatchewan Roughriders
- DT – Aaron Hunt, BC Lions
- DT – Tyrone Williams, BC Lions
- LB – Brian Clark, Calgary Stampeders
- LB – Otis Floyd, BC Lions
- LB – Reggie Hunt, Saskatchewan Roughriders
- DB – Korey Banks, BC Lions
- DB – Eddie Davis, Saskatchewan Roughriders
- CB – Dante Marsh, BC Lions
- CB – Coby Rhinehart, Calgary Stampeders
- DS – Barron Miles, BC Lions

=== Special teams ===
- K – Sandro DeAngelis, Calgary Stampeders
- P – Burke Dales, Calgary Stampeders
- ST – Carl Kidd, BC Lions

== 2006 Eastern All-Stars ==
=== Offence ===
- QB – Anthony Calvillo, Montreal Alouettes
- WR – Ben Cahoon, Montreal Alouettes
- WR – Milt Stegall, Winnipeg Blue Bombers
- WR – Arland Bruce III, Toronto Argonauts
- WR – Kerry Watkins, Montreal Alouettes
- RB – Robert Edwards, Montreal Alouettes
- RB – Charles Roberts, Winnipeg Blue Bombers
- OT – Bernard Williams, Toronto Argonauts
- OT – Jerome Davis, Toronto Argonauts
- OG – Scott Flory, Montreal Alouettes
- OG – Jude St. John, Toronto Argonauts
- C – Bryan Chiu, Montreal Alouettes

=== Defence ===
- DE – Gavin Walls, Winnipeg Blue Bombers
- DE – Jonathan Brown, Toronto Argonauts
- DT – Ed Philion, Montreal Alouettes
- DT – Doug Brown, Winnipeg Blue Bombers
- LB – Kevin Eiben, Toronto Argonauts
- LB – Tim Strickland, Montreal Alouettes
- LB – Barrin Simpson, Winnipeg Blue Bombers
- DB – Tay Cody Hamilton Tiger-Cats
- DB – Kenny Wheaton, Toronto Argonauts
- CB – Byron Parker, Toronto Argonauts
- CB – Jordan Younger, Toronto Argonauts
- DS – Orlondo Steinauer, Toronto Argonauts

=== Special teams ===
- K – Damon Duval, Montreal Alouettes
- P – Noel Prefontaine, Toronto Argonauts
- ST – Albert Johnson III, Winnipeg Blue Bombers

== 2006 Intergold CFLPA All-Stars ==
=== Offence ===
- QB – Henry Burris, Calgary Stampeders
- OT – Gene Makowsky, Saskatchewan Roughriders
- OT – Bernard Williams, Toronto Argonauts
- OG – Dan Comiskey, Edmonton Eskimos
- OG – Scott Flory, Montreal Alouettes
- C – Bryan Chiu, Montreal Alouettes
- RB – Joffrey Reynolds, Calgary Stampeders
- FB – Chris Szarka, Saskatchewan Roughriders
- SB – Geroy Simon, BC Lions
- SB – Milton Stegall, Winnipeg Blue Bombers
- WR – Arland Bruce, Toronto Argonauts
- WR – Kerry Watkins, Montreal Alouettes

=== Defence ===
- DE – Brent Johnson, BC Lions
- DE – Fred Perry, Saskatchewan Roughriders
- DT – Doug Brown, Winnipeg Blue Bombers
- DT – Tyrone Williams, BC Lions
- LB – Barrin Simpson, Winnipeg Blue Bombers
- LB – Otis Floyd, BC Lions
- LB – Brian Clark, Calgary Stampeders
- CB – Tay Cody, Hamilton Tiger-Cats
- CB – Omarr Morgan, Saskatchewan Roughriders
- HB – Korey Banks, BC Lions
- HB – Eddie Davis, Saskatchewan Roughriders
- S – Barron Miles, BC Lions

=== Special teams ===
- K – Sandro DeAngelis, Calgary Stampeders
- ST – Sandro DeAngelis, Calgary Stampeders
- P – Damon Duval, Montreal Alouettes

=== Head coach ===
- Wally Buono, BC Lions

== 2006 Rogers CFL Awards ==
- CFL's Most Outstanding Player Award – Geroy Simon (SB), BC Lions
- CFL's Most Outstanding Canadian Award – Brent Johnson (DE), BC Lions
- CFL's Most Outstanding Defensive Player Award – Brent Johnson (DE), BC Lions
- CFL's Most Outstanding Offensive Lineman Award – Rob Murphy (OG), BC Lions
- CFL's Most Outstanding Rookie Award – Aaron Hunt (DT), BC Lions
- CFL's Most Outstanding Special Teams Award – Sandro DeAngelis (K), Calgary Stampeders
- CFLPA's Outstanding Community Service Award – Mark Washington (DB), BC Lions
- Rogers Fans' Choice Award – Geroy Simon (SB), BC Lions
- CFL's Scotiabank Coach of the Year – Wally Buono, BC Lions
- Commissioner's Award - Winnipeg Blue Bombers Ghosts
- Hugh Campbell Distinguished Leadership Award - Hugh Campbell, Edmonton Eskimos
