= Korey Banks =

American football player (born 1979)

No. 24
- Position: Defensive back

Personal information
- Born: August 7, 1979 (age 47); Boynton Beach, Florida, U.S.
- Listed height: 5 ft 10 in (1.78 m)
- Listed weight: 185 lb (84 kg)

Career information
- College: Mississippi State
- NFL draft: 2003: undrafted

Career history
- 2003–2004: Washington Redskins*
- 2004–2005: Miami Dolphins*
- 2004: Edmonton Eskimos*
- 2004–2005: Ottawa Renegades
- 2006–2013: BC Lions
- 2014: Winnipeg Blue Bombers*
- * Offseason or practice squad member only

Awards and highlights
- 2× Grey Cup champion (2006, 2011); 4× CFL All-Star (2006, 2009, 2011, 2012); 7× CFL West All-Star (2006, 2007, 2008, 2009, 2010, 2011, 2012); CFL East All-Star (2005)
- Stats at CFL.ca (archive)

Korey Banks (born August 7, 1979) is an American former professional football defensive back who played in the Canadian Football League (CFL). He played college football for the Mississippi State Bulldogs.

== Professional career ==
=== NFL ===
In 2003, he signed as an undrafted rookie with the Miami Dolphins of the National Football League. He was waived after training camp on August 31, 2003. The Dolphins put him on waivers and he was assigned to the practice squad on November 11. On November 24, he was released by the Dolphins. Miami re-signed him on December 31, 2003 and he played in their last two games.

=== Ottawa Renegades ===
He was acquired by the Ottawa Renegades in a late season trade in 2004 after spending time on the Edmonton Eskimos' practice roster. Edmonton traded their first and second picks in the 2005 CFL draft, along with Banks, to Ottawa in exchange for Clinton Wayne and Patrick Kabongo. In 2004, he had seven tackles in three games for Ottawa.

Korey had an outstanding 2005 season with a league-leading 10 interceptions, two touchdowns, 44 tackles, 12 pass knockdowns, two forced fumbles and one fumble recovery. He was the Renegades' nominee for Most Outstanding Defensive Player and was named a 2005 CFL All-Star.

=== BC Lions ===
When the Renegades were suspended after the 2005 season, Banks was drafted in the first round, 6th overall, by the BC Lions in the 2006 Ottawa Renegades Dispersal Draft. Banks recorded a touchdown and 7 interceptions in his first season with the Lions in which he helped them win the 94th Grey Cup. He has since been named a CFL All-Star in 2006, 2009, 2011 and 2012 as well as a West Division All-Star from 2006 to 2011. Following the 2013 CFL season Banks entered his optional year of his contract, he expressed his desire to negotiate a new contract extension at an increased salary to what his option year salary would pay him. The BC Lions refused to grant Banks a contract extension.

=== Winnipeg Blue Bombers ===
On January 31, 2014, Banks was traded to the Winnipeg Blue Bombers in exchange for non-import wide receiver Kito Poblah. On February 19, 2014, the Bombers signed Banks to a contract extension through the 2015 CFL season. Banks was reportedly a healthy scratch for the Bombers' first game of the season and was eventually released on June 29, 2014 when he could not be traded.

== Personal life ==
He has two sons, Korey Jr. and Kamden, as well as a daughter, Kennedy. He is cousins with San Francisco 49ers wide receiver Anquan Boldin and former Miami Dolphins running back Autry Denson.
