= Rob Murphy (gridiron football) =

American gridiron football player (born 1977)

No. 61
- Position: Center

Personal information
- Born: January 18, 1977 (age 49); Buffalo, New York, U.S.
- Listed height: 6 ft 5 in (1.96 m)
- Listed weight: 310 lb (141 kg)

Career information
- College: Ohio State
- NFL draft: 1999: undrafted

Career history
- Cincinnati Bengals (1999)*; Frankfurt Galaxy (2000); Kansas City Chiefs (2000); Chicago Enforcers (2001); Indianapolis Colts (2001–2002); San Francisco 49ers (2003–2004); Detroit Lions (2005)*; BC Lions (2006–2008); Toronto Argonauts (2009–2011)
- * Offseason or practice squad member only

Awards and highlights
- Grey Cup champion (2006); 2× CFL's Most Outstanding Offensive Lineman Award (2006, 2007); 2× DeMarco-Becket Memorial Trophy (2006, 2007); Consensus All-American (1998); First-team All-American (1997); First-team All-Big Ten (1998); Second-team All-Big Ten (1997)
- Stats at Pro Football Reference

Robert Donald Murphy (born January 18, 1977) is an American former professional football player who was a center in the National Football League (NFL) and Canadian Football League (CFL). He played college football for the Ohio State Buckeyes, earning consensus All-American honors in 1998. Murphy was signed by the Kansas City Chiefs as an undrafted free agent in 2000, and played professionally for the Frankfurt Galaxy, Chicago Enforcers, Indianapolis Colts, San Francisco 49ers, BC Lions and Toronto Argonauts.

== Early life ==
Murphy was born in Buffalo, New York. He attended Moeller High School in Cincinnati, Ohio, and played football, ice hockey, and wrestled for the Moeller Crusaders.

== College career ==
Murphy attended Ohio State University, and was a three-year starter for the Ohio State Buckeyes football team. He participated in the 1997 Rose Bowl and the 1998 Sugar Bowl. He was a first-team All-American selection in 1997 and a consensus first-team All-American in 1998, and twice received first-team All-Big Ten honours.

== Professional career ==
Murphy signed with the Cincinnati Bengals in 1999, was on the practice squad and was picked up by the Kansas City Chiefs in the last week of the 1999 season and signed to the active roster. He was allocated by the Chiefs to NFL Europe and played and started 10 games with the Frankfurt Galaxy in 2000.

He was put on the injured reserve by the Kansas City Chiefs in 2000 and was released at the end of the season. Murphy was selected 184th overall by the Chicago Enforcers in the 2001 XFL draft and started 11 games including their playoff game.

At the end of the XFL season Murphy signed a free agent contract with the Indianapolis Colts. Signed to active roster in week 3. But did not see any action. In 2002, he played in 10 games and 1 playoff game against the NY Jets and was also used as a short yardage tight end. He was released in August 2003 and immediately signed with the San Francisco 49ers. He played in 2 games in 2003. In 2004 Murphy played in 14 games at the guard position.

In Spring of 2005 he was released and signed by the Detroit Lions. He was released at the end of training camp but was signed back at the halfway point in the season. He went unsigned in the NFL after the end of the 2005 season.

=== Canadian Football League ===
The BC Lions signed Murphy as a free agent prior to the 2006 CFL season and made an immediate impact winning the CFL's Most Outstanding Offensive Lineman Award, was selected to the CFL All-Star team, and helped the Lions win the 94th Grey Cup; all in his first CFL season. With such success, Murphy was able to renegotiate a significant salary increase for the option year on his contract.

Murphy continued his success in the 2007 CFL season. He was again named the CFL's Most Outstanding Offensive Lineman and selected for the CFL All-Star team. He was named Gladiator of the Game during Friday Night Football against Edmonton Eskimos and, at the conclusion of the season, named a 2007 Walby Warrior.

In 2008, he was again named a CFL All Star.

He became a free agent on February 16, 2009, and the Argonauts signed him the same day for a two-year deal worth $400,000 plus incentives.

He started all 18 games at Left Tackle.

In 2010 Murphy had a resurgence from the 2009 season. He was voted team captain and was again named a CFL and Divisional All Star for the 4th year of his five years in the CFL. He was nominated as the Argonauts Most Outstanding Lineman. Murphy was named "Nastiest Player" in the CFL according to a TSN players poll at the end of the season. He currently hosts a weekly radio show on TSN 1050 with Cybulski and Company called Murphy's Law. He is heard frequently as well as a fill in co-host on TSN 1050. He is known for his quick wit and shoot straight from the hip attitude as his on-air persona.

On May 23, 2012, Murphy announced his retirement from professional football.
