= Sandro DeAngelis =

Canadian gridiron football player (born 1981)

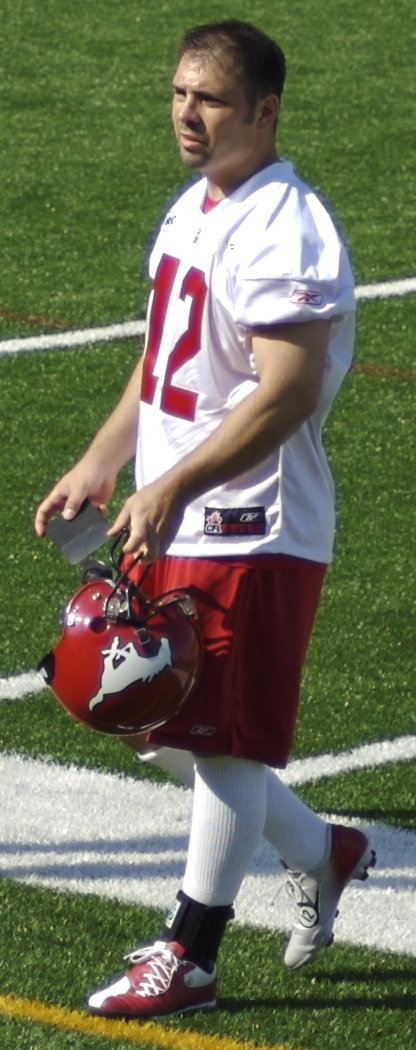
- DeAngelis with the Calgary Stampeders in 2007

Profile
- Position: Kicker

Personal information
- Born: May 1, 1981 (age 45); Niagara Falls, Ontario, Canada
- Listed height: 5 ft 8 in (1.73 m)
- Listed weight: 195 lb (88 kg)

Career information
- High school: St. Joseph's Collegiate Institute
- College: Nebraska

Career history
- 2005–2009: Calgary Stampeders
- 2010: Hamilton Tiger-Cats
- 2011: Montreal Alouettes
- 2012: Saskatchewan Roughriders
- 2013: Winnipeg Blue Bombers

Awards and highlights
- Grey Cup champion (2008); Dick Suderman Trophy (2008); John Agro Special Teams Award (2006); 4× Dave Dryburgh Memorial Trophy (2005, 2006, 2008, 2009); 3× CFL All-Star (2005, 2006, 2008); 5× CFL West All-Star (2005, 2006, 2007, 2008, 2009)
- Stats at CFL.ca (archive)

Sandro DeAngelis (born May 1, 1981) is a Canadian former professional football placekicker who played in the Canadian Football League (CFL). DeAngelis is among the most accurate kickers in CFL history. He won a Grey Cup championship with the Calgary Stampeders in 2008.

== Early life ==
DeAngelis starred at fullback and linebacker for St. Joseph’s Collegiate in Buffalo, N.Y. and earned First-Team All-Western New York honours as a kicker in 1999, connecting on four field goals, while kicking 70 percent of his kickoffs into the end zone. He also rushed for 600 yards and nine touchdowns in just four games. As a junior, DeAngelis rushed for 1,821 yards and 22 touchdowns, while averaging 42 yards per punt, including a school record 84-yard return. He also connected on five field goals and 37 PATs. DeAngelis’ longest field goal was a 46-yard kick as a sophomore.

DeAngelis was a first-team All-New York selection and was chosen as the Buffalo News Player of the Year and the Western New York Player of the Year, while earning honorable-mention All-America honors from USA Today. An outstanding student, he was a member of his school’s Collegiate Scholars Club, National Honor Society and earned academic All-Western New York honors.

DeAngelis went on to play college football at the University of Nebraska from 2000–2004. He was the team's starting placekicker for parts of three seasons.

== Professional career ==
He signed with the Calgary Stampeders as a free agent on March 8, 2005. In his first year, DeAngelis led the league in field goal percentage (76.9%) connecting on 40 of 52 field goals. He finished second in the league with 179 points and kicked the longest field goal of the season in the CFL from 56 yards. He finished third in the league with a 58.9 kickoff average. DeAngelis was named to the CFL Western All-Star team and CFL All-Star team, and was also named Player of the Week twice, in Weeks 9 and 18.

In 2006, DeAngelis was the league's leading scorer, with 214 points. DeAngelis connected on a league leading 56 of 65 field goal attempts. His 86.2% conversion rate was second in the league. His 53-yard kick tied for the longest kick in the CFL. DeAngelis also led the league with 84 kickoffs and 4,762 kickoff yards. The 56.9 yard kickoff average ranked sixth in the league.

On November 23, 2008, DeAngelis won his first Grey Cup championship with the Stampeders against the hosting Montreal Alouettes. His 5 field goal performance, including one from 51 yards, earned him the Dick Suderman Trophy as the Grey Cup's Most Outstanding Canadian.

On February 22, 2010, DeAngelis signed with the Hamilton Tiger-Cats as a free agent. During the 2010 season, he kicked for a career low 76.2%, leading to his eventual release the following off-season on May 24, 2011.

On May 30, 2011, DeAngelis signed with the Montreal Alouettes. After failing to dress for a game in 2011, he requested to be released by the Alouettes and in February 2012, his request was granted.

On August 6, 2012, DeAngelis signed with the Saskatchewan Roughriders. He was later released on January 22, 2013.

On August 13, 2013, DeAngelis signed with the Winnipeg Blue Bombers and placed on their practice roster. On December 19, 2013, after the conclusion of the season, the Blue Bombers announced that they had released DeAngelis.

== Post-playing career ==
After retiring following the 2013 CFL season, DeAngelis became a teacher at Millard North Middle School in Omaha, Nebraska where he is also the boys varsity soccer coach.
