= Brent Johnson (Canadian football) =

Canadian gridiron football player (born 1976)

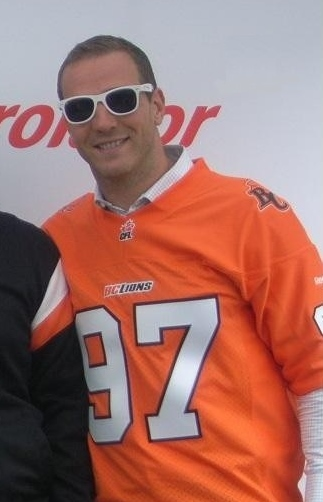
- Johnson in 2012

No. 97
- Position: Defensive end

Personal information
- Born: December 7, 1976 (age 49); Kingston, Ontario, Canada
- Listed height: 6 ft 3 in (1.91 m)
- Listed weight: 265 lb (120 kg)

Career information
- College: Ohio State
- CFL draft: 2000: 3rd round, 20th overall pick

Career history
- 2001–2011: BC Lions

Awards and highlights
- 2× Grey Cup champion (2006, 2011); CFL Most Outstanding Defensive Player (2006); Norm Fieldgate Trophy (2006); 2× CFL Most Outstanding Canadian (2005, 2006); 2× Dr. Beattie Martin Trophy (2005, 2006); 3× CFL All-Star (2005, 2006, 2008); 5× CFL West All-Star (2004, 2005, 2006, 2008, 2010); All-Big 10 team (2000); BC Lions Wall of Fame; BC Lions #97 retired
- Stats at CFL.ca (archive)
- Canadian Football Hall of Fame (Class of 2018)

Brent Johnson (born December 7, 1976) is a Canadian former professional football defensive lineman who played for the BC Lions of the Canadian Football League (CFL). He attended Ohio State University, where he played for the Buckeyes.

== Professional career ==
Brent Johnson was drafted by the Lions in the third round, 20th overall of the 2000 CFL draft. He started playing for BC in 2001. Johnson led the CFL in sacks with 17 in the 2005 CFL season and 16 in the 2006 CFL season. He won the CFL's Most Outstanding Canadian Award and was named a CFL All-Star in both years. Johnson also won the CFL's Most Outstanding Defensive Player Award in 2006. He was awarded his third CFL All-Star selection for his performance in the 2008 CFL season. He holds the record for sacks with the BC Lions with 89 over his 11-year career.

== Personal ==
Johnson lives in Vancouver with his wife Lara and his son Roman.
