= Barron Miles =

American football player and coach (born 1972)

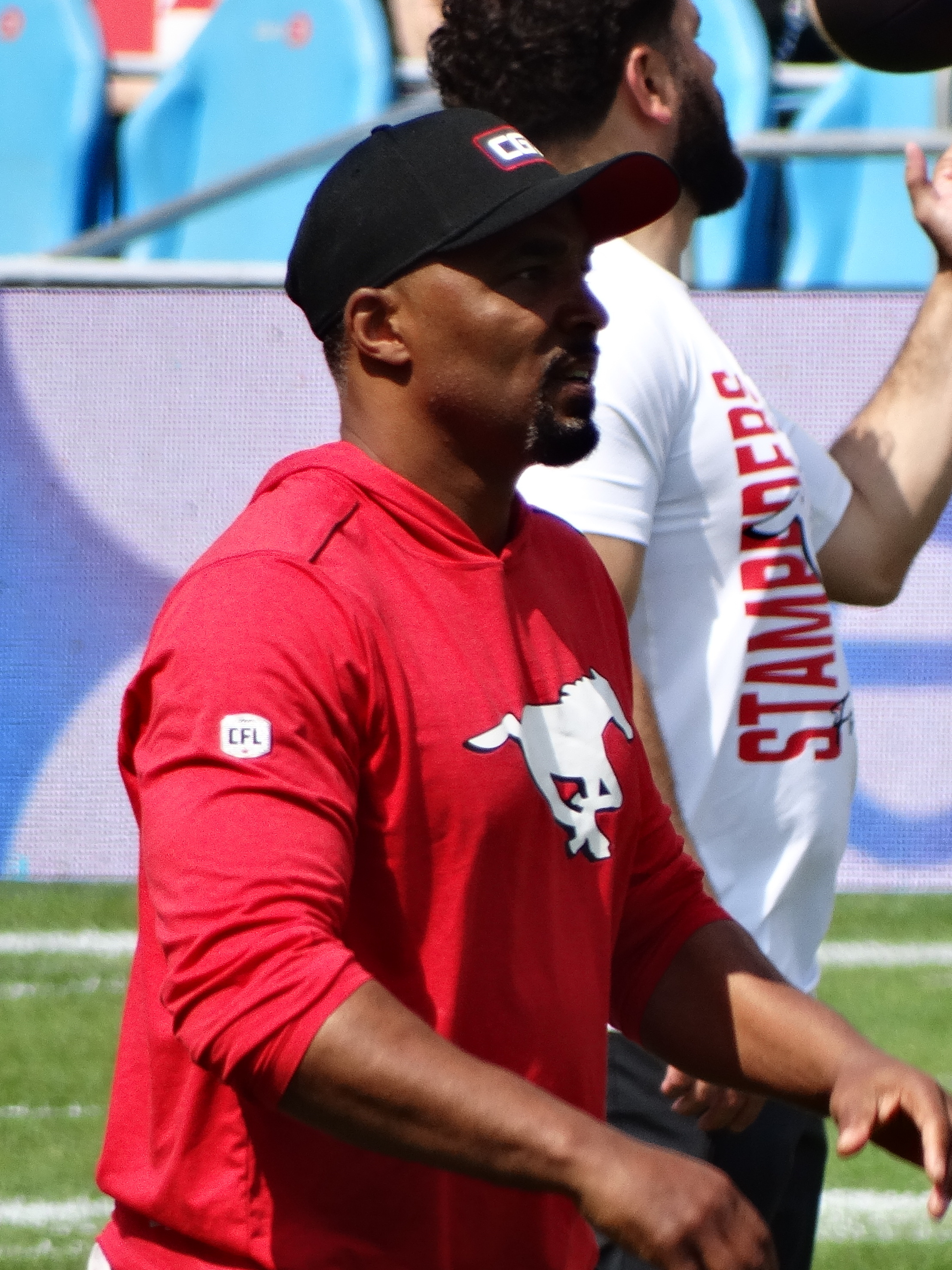
- Miles with the Calgary Stampeders in 2025

Calgary Stampeders
- Title: Defensive backs coach

Personal information
- Born: January 1, 1972 (age 54); Roselle, New Jersey, U.S.
- Listed height: 5 ft 9 in (1.75 m)
- Listed weight: 182 lb (83 kg)

Career information
- High school: Abraham Clark (Roselle)
- College: Nebraska
- NFL draft: 1995: 6th round, 199th overall pick

Career history

Playing
- Pittsburgh Steelers (1995); Frankfurt Galaxy (1997); Pittsburgh Steelers (1997)*; Montreal Alouettes (1998–2004); BC Lions (2005–2009)
- * Offseason or practice squad member only

Coaching
- BC Lions (2010–2011) Defensive assistant; Saskatchewan Roughriders (2012–2014) Defensive backs coach; Winnipeg Blue Bombers (2015) Defensive backs coach; Edmonton Eskimos (2016–2019) DB/Player development coach; Montreal Alouettes (2020) DB/Passing game coordinator; Montreal Alouettes (2021–2022) Defensive coordinator; Bishop's Gaiters (2022) Defensive coordinator; Ottawa Redblacks (2023–2024) Defensive coordinator; Calgary Stampeders (2025–present) Defensive backs coach

Awards and highlights
- 4× Grey Cup champion (2002, 2006, 2011, 2013); 6× CFL All-Star (1999, 2000, 2003, 2006, 2008, 2009); 5× CFL East All-Star (1999-2003); 5× CFL West All-Star (2005-2009); Frank M. Gibson Trophy (1998); James P. McCaffrey Trophy (2002); Tom Pate Memorial Award (2004); National champion (1994); Third-team All-American (1994); First-team All-Big Eight (1994); CFL record: All-time leader in blocked kicks (13)
- Canadian Football Hall of Fame

Barron Miles (born January 1, 1972) is an American former professional football player who is the defensive backs coach for the Calgary Stampeders of the Canadian Football League (CFL). He has also served as the defensive coordinator for the Montreal Alouettes and Ottawa Redblacks of the CFL. He played for 12 years in the CFL as a defensive back where he finished his career tied for second all-time in career interceptions with 66 and as the all-time leader in blocked kicks with 13. He was inducted into the Canadian Football Hall of Fame in 2018.

== Early life ==
Raised in Roselle, New Jersey, Miles played prep football on both offense and defence at Abraham Clark High School.

== College career ==
One of the top cornerbacks and special teams players in school history at the University of Nebraska–Lincoln, Barron Miles helped Nebraska win the 1994 NCAA college football national championship, and deliver Tom Osborne's first national title. He earned All-Big Eight honors in 1993 and 1994 and ranks among NU's all-time top 10 in pass breakups. He also blocked a school-record seven punts during his career.

== Professional career ==
Miles was drafted by the Pittsburgh Steelers in 1995, but failed to make the team after suffering a serious knee injury in a preseason game versus the Buffalo Bills during his rookie season. He was assigned to the Frankfurt Galaxy of NFL Europa in 1997.

Miles joined the Montreal Alouettes in 1998, and made an immediate impact, winning the CFL East Division Rookie of the Year Award. Miles played seven seasons with Montreal, and was named a CFL All-Star three times (1999, 2000, 2002) during his tenure as a Lark.

In 2005, Miles signed with the BC Lions as a free agent, and started 17 of 18 games for the Lions at safety missing only one game due to injury. Miles was named to the 2005 CFL West Division All-Star team as a defensive back and led the Lions with six interceptions (4th in the CFL).

In 2006, Miles led the CFL in interceptions with 10, for 206 return yards, and two touchdowns. During a 2006 CFL All-Star season, Miles recorded 39 defensive tackles, four pass knockdowns, three forced fumbles, and a fumble recovery. Miles also notched one defensive tackle, a blocked kick, and a quarterback sack in the Lions' CFL West Division Championship game against the Saskatchewan Roughriders, as well as three defensive tackles in the Lions' 25-14 Grey Cup Championship victory over Miles' old team, the Montreal Alouettes.

On August 7, 2009, Miles became the CFL's career leader for blocked kicks (13) with a blocked extra point against the Saskatchewan Roughriders.

Miles is a five-time CFL All-Star at the defensive back position and finished his career with 66 interceptions.

== Coaching career ==
Miles began his coaching career as a defensive backs coach for the Senior Varsity Lord Tweedsmuir Panthers during the 2009 season. After serving as an assistant defensive coach and defensive backs coach in the CFL for four teams over 11 years, Miles was named the defensive coordinator for the Montreal Alouettes in 2021. He continued in that role to begin the 2022 season, but was fired after four games on July 6, 2022.

Miles was hired as the defensive coordinator for the Bishop's Gaiters in August 2022.

On December 5, 2022, it was announced that Miles had been hired by the Ottawa Redblacks to become their defensive coordinator. He served in that role for two seasons before mutually parting ways with the organization following the 2024 season on November 8, 2024.

Miles was named the defensive backs coach for the Calgary Stampeders on December 16, 2024.

== Personal life ==
Miles and his wife Jennifer have three children: Raven, Barron Jr. and Ava.
