= Aaron Hunt (gridiron football) =

American gridiron football player (born 1980)

No. 99
- Position: Defensive tackle

Personal information
- Born: June 19, 1980 (age 46); Houston, Texas, U.S.
- Listed height: 6 ft 3 in (1.91 m)
- Listed weight: 270 lb (122 kg)

Career information
- College: Texas Tech
- NFL draft: 2003: 6th round, 194th overall pick

Career history
- 2003: Denver Broncos*
- 2003: Arizona Cardinals*
- 2004: Miami Dolphins*
- 2005: Denver Broncos*
- 2005: → Hamburg Sea Devils
- 2006–2011: BC Lions
- 2012: Montreal Alouettes
- * Offseason or practice squad member only

Awards and highlights
- 2× Grey Cup champion (2006, 2011); 2× CFL All-Star (2008, 2011); 5× CFL West All-Star (2006–2009, 2011); Most Outstanding Rookie (2006); Jackie Parker Trophy (2006); Second-team All-Big 12 (2001)
- Stats at CFL.ca (archive)

Aaron Hunt (born June 19, 1980) is an American former professional football defensive tackle.

== College career ==
Hunt attended Texas Tech University and played for the Texas Tech Red Raiders football team. He set a Big 12 record for most career sacks with 34, and it would stand until 2022 when it was equaled by Iowa State's Will McDonald.

== Professional career ==
=== Denver Broncos (first stint) ===
In 2003, Hunt was selected in the sixth round (194th overall) by the Denver Broncos in the 2003 NFL draft. He was released by Denver on September 4, 2003.

=== Arizona Cardinals ===
Hunt spent the last 3 weeks of the 2003 season on the Arizona Cardinals practice squad.

=== Miami Dolphins ===
In 2004, Hunt spent training camp with the Miami Dolphins but was waived on August 27.

=== Denver Broncos (second stint) ===
In 2005, Hunt re-signed with the Broncos in March 2005 and spent a season in NFL Europa. There, he played with the Hamburg Sea Devils and recorded 3 sacks and 23 total tackles. Hunt was waived by Denver on August 27.

=== BC Lions ===
In May 2006, Hunt was signed as a free agent by the BC Lions of the Canadian Football League and had a great first year. Hunt won the CFL's Most Outstanding Rookie Award and Jackie Parker Trophy for best rookie in the West Division. Hunt was named a 2006 West Division All-Star, and was a member of the Lions 2006 Grey Cup championship team.

=== Montreal Alouettes ===
After becoming a free agent in 2012, Hunt signed with the Montreal Alouettes on February 21, 2012. Hunt was released by Montreal on July 24, 2012, after four games, recording 4 tackles and 0 sacks in that span.

== Personal life ==
Hunt is the younger brother of linebacker Reggie Hunt. The elder Hunt retired in 2011 after stints with the Edmonton Eskimos, Montreal Alouettes and Saskatchewan Roughriders.
