= 2008 CFL season =

Canadian Football League season

- Duration: June 26 – November 1, 2008
- East champions: Montreal Alouettes
- West champions: Calgary Stampeders

96th Grey Cup
- Date: November 23, 2008
- Venue: Olympic Stadium, Montreal
- Champions: Calgary Stampeders

CFL seasons
- ← 2007 2009 →

Canadian Football League team locations: West, East

The 2008 CFL season was the 55th season of modern-day Canadian football, the 51st season for the Canadian Football League. It was also the first CFL season in which all of the league's regular season and post-season games, including the Grey Cup game, were aired on TSN. This meant the CFL was no longer aired on broadcast television in Canada. As of 2008, TSN was available in approximately 8.8 million of Canada's 13 million households. Montreal hosted the 96th Grey Cup at Olympic Stadium on November 23, 2008, when the championship was won by the Calgary Stampeders.

== CFL news in 2008 ==
=== Schedule ===
On February 21, 2008, the CFL announced the game schedule for the 2008 season. It was a 19-week schedule that included 18 regular-season games and one bye week for each team. Bye weeks were taken consecutively by each division, beginning with the West in Week 8, thus creating two weeks of divisional rivalry games.

The regular-season schedule began on Thursday, June 26, with an East-West double-header. For the first time since 1977, the season opener took place at Hamilton's Ivor Wynne Stadium, with the host Tiger-Cats losing to the Montreal Alouettes 33–10. The second game of the double-header saw the Calgary Stampeders at home, where they prevailed 28–18 over the BC Lions. The Toronto Argonauts opened by beating the host Winnipeg Blue Bombers 23–16 the following night, and the Saskatchewan Roughriders defeated the Edmonton Eskimos, in Regina, by a score of 34–13 on June 28.

The regular season concluded with a double-header on Saturday, November 1, with divisional playoffs the following weekend. The 2008 season officially ended with the playing of the 96th Grey Cup Championship on Sunday, November 23, in Montreal.

=== Television ===
2008 marked the first year in which the entire CFL schedule, including the playoffs and the Grey Cup game, was televised by TSN. CBC Television did not broadcast any games for the first time since CFL games began being televised in 1952, as the CFL and TSN began an exclusive five-year deal. This led some to criticize TSN, because the Grey Cup aired on a cable channel (TSN) while CTV—TSN's majority owner—broadcast regular-season NFL games. Because of obligations to other sporting events, concerns intensified after TSN began relegating some CFL games to its new digital channel TSN2 (which was not available to analog cable subscribers), while other sports, including the NFL, were broadcast. In addition, TSN severely curtailed high-definition coverage for the final three weeks of the regular season, with only five of the twelve games being made available in HD.

Montreal games, as well as the entire playoffs and the Grey Cup game, were televised in French by RDS.

In the United States, a last-minute deal was reached between the league and its longtime American syndicator America One, which carried two games each week. Internet broadcasts were also aired in the United States on ESPN360.

=== CFL in Ottawa ===
On March 25, 2008, the CFL granted a conditional franchise—slated to begin play in 2010—to an Ottawa-based group led by Jeff Hunt, owner of the Ontario Hockey League's Ottawa 67's, under the condition that the group could secure a lease agreement with the City of Ottawa to allow the team to play at Frank Clair Stadium. The franchise was based on the remnants of the Ottawa Renegades, but was to be a separate team. In November, it was announced that the 2014 Grey Cup would be granted to Ottawa, again based on the condition that use of Frank Clair Stadium could be secured.

=== Competition with the NFL ===
2008 was the first year in which the National Football League played a regular season game in Toronto, as part of an agreement reached between the owners of the Rogers Centre and that league and the Buffalo Bills. The NFL accommodated the CFL by playing the regular season game on December 7, after the end of the CFL season, so that the leagues did not directly compete. A preseason game was also played in Toronto, on August 14, between the Bills and the Pittsburgh Steelers, one day before the Toronto Argonauts played in the Rogers Centre, and concurrently with the Hamilton Tiger-Cats' game in Winnipeg. The Bills' preseason game did not sell out, amid reports of exorbitant ticket prices and thousands of tickets being given away.

=== Marketing and heritage revisited ===
In an effort to expand the CFL merchandise line, it was announced that RBK would release vintage jerseys for each team, beginning with the Toronto Argonauts and Winnipeg Blue Bombers. The launch for the new apparel began August 29, 2008, with releases in Toronto and Winnipeg retail stores attended by Argonaut players Kerry Joseph and Arland Bruce III and Blue Bombers Kevin Glenn and Milt Stegall respectively.

=== Attendance ===
Attendance in the CFL remained strong in 2008, averaging 28,914 per game and exceeded two million fans for the seventh straight season.

=== Records and milestones ===
- On June 26, Montreal quarterback Anthony Calvillo surpassed Danny McManus to become the second-all-time leading passer in the CFL, in a game against the Hamilton Tiger-Cats.
- On July 25, BC Lions slotback Geroy Simon surpassed Jim "Dirty 30" Young as the Lions' all-time receiving yards leader, in a game against the Montreal Alouettes.
- On September 12, Winnipeg slotback Milt Stegall surpassed Allen Pitts to become the CFL's all-time leader in career receiving yards, with 14,982, against the Toronto Argonauts.
- On September 13, Lions running back and former Blue Bomber Charles Roberts reached over 10,000 rushing yards in his CFL career in a game versus the Saskatchewan Roughriders.
- On September 19, Stegall became the first-ever CFL player to reach 15,000 yards receiving, during a contest against the Hamilton Tiger-Cats.
- On October 4, Montreal Alouettes slotback Ben Cahoon surpassed Ray Elgaard to become the leading Canadian receiver in CFL history, with 831 receptions, also against the Hamilton Tiger-Cats.
- On November 1, BC Lions kick returner Ian Smart set a new CFL record for most kickoff return yardage.
- The CFL experienced its sixth highest scoring season in its history, averaging 56.24 combined points per game, a 14.5% increase from 2007 and 20.5% from 2006.

== Regular season ==
West Division
| Pos | Team | Pld | W | L | T | PF | PA | PD | Pts |
|---|---|---|---|---|---|---|---|---|---|
| 1 | Calgary Stampeders (C, Q) | 18 | 13 | 5 | 0 | 595 | 420 | +175 | 26 |
| 2 | Saskatchewan Roughriders (Q) | 18 | 12 | 6 | 0 | 500 | 471 | +29 | 24 |
| 3 | BC Lions (Q) | 18 | 11 | 7 | 0 | 559 | 479 | +80 | 22 |
| 4 | Edmonton Eskimos (Q) | 18 | 10 | 8 | 0 | 512 | 536 | −24 | 20 |

Source: "2008 Regular Season Standings". Canadian Football League. Archived from the original on February 5, 2009.
(C) First round bye; (Q) Qualified for playoffs

East Division
| Pos | Team | Pld | W | L | T | PF | PA | PD | Pts |
|---|---|---|---|---|---|---|---|---|---|
| 1 | Montreal Alouettes (C, Q) | 18 | 11 | 7 | 0 | 610 | 443 | +167 | 22 |
| 2 | Winnipeg Blue Bombers (Q) | 18 | 8 | 10 | 0 | 435 | 490 | −55 | 16 |
| 3 | Toronto Argonauts | 18 | 4 | 14 | 0 | 397 | 627 | −230 | 8 |
| 4 | Hamilton Tiger-Cats | 18 | 3 | 15 | 0 | 441 | 593 | −152 | 6 |

Source: "2008 Regular Season Standings". Canadian Football League. Archived from the original on February 5, 2009.
(C) First round bye; (Q) Qualified for playoffs

Notes
A team that placed fourth in one division was eligible to "cross over" and claim the third playoff spot in the other division if they had a better overall record than the other division's third-place team. In 2008, this meant the Edmonton Eskimos got the third-place spot in the Eastern Division; however, Winnipeg retained home-field advantage for the East semi-final even though Edmonton had a better win–loss record.

== Grey Cup playoffs ==
The Calgary Stampeders are the 2008 Grey Cup champions, defeating the Montreal Alouettes 22–14 at Montreal's Olympic Stadium. It was the first Grey Cup for the Stampeders since the 2001 Championship (a game also held in Montreal). Stampeder quarterback Henry Burris was named the Grey Cup Most Valuable Player, and kicker Sandro DeAngelis was named the Grey Cup Most Valuable Canadian.

=== Playoff bracket ===
November 8: Division Semi-finals
East
W4 | Edmonton Eskimos | 29
E2 | Winnipeg Blue Bombers | 21
West
W3 | BC Lions | 33
W2 | Saskatchewan Roughriders | 12

November 15: Division Finals
W4 | Edmonton Eskimos | 26
E1 | Montreal Alouettes | 36
W3 | BC Lions | 18
W1 | Calgary Stampeders | 22

November 23: 96th Grey Cup @ Olympic Stadium – Montreal, QC
E1 | Montreal Alouettes | 14
W1 | Calgary Stampeders | 22

== CFL leaders ==
- CFL passing leaders
- CFL rushing leaders
- CFL receiving leaders

== 2008 CFL All-Stars ==
=== Offence ===
- QB – Anthony Calvillo, Montreal Alouettes
- WR – Geroy Simon, BC Lions
- WR – Jamel Richardson, Montreal Alouettes
- WR – Ken-Yon Rambo, Calgary Stampeders
- WR – Ben Cahoon, Montreal Alouettes
- RB – Wes Cates, Saskatchewan Roughriders
- RB – Joffrey Reynolds, Calgary Stampeders
- OT – Jason Jimenez, BC Lions
- OT – Dan Goodspeed, Winnipeg Blue Bombers
- OG – Gene Makowsky, Saskatchewan Roughriders
- OG – Scott Flory, Montreal Alouettes
- C – Bryan Chiu, Montreal Alouettes

=== Defence ===
- DE – Brent Johnson, BC Lions
- DE – Cameron Wake, BC Lions
- DT – Doug Brown, Winnipeg Blue Bombers
- DT – Aaron Hunt, BC Lions
- LB – Maurice Lloyd, Saskatchewan Roughriders
- LB – Anton McKenzie, Saskatchewan Roughriders
- LB – Zeke Moreno, Winnipeg Blue Bombers
- DB – Jason Goss, Edmonton Eskimos
- DB – Chris Thompson, Hamilton Tiger-Cats
- CB – Brandon Browner, Calgary Stampeders
- CB – Dante Marsh, BC Lions
- DS – Barron Miles, BC Lions

=== Special teams ===
- K – Sandro DeAngelis, Calgary Stampeders
- P – Nick Setta, Hamilton Tiger-Cats
- ST – Dominique Dorsey, Toronto Argonauts

== 2008 Western All-Stars ==
=== Offence ===
- QB – Henry Burris, Calgary Stampeders
- WR – Paris Jackson, BC Lions
- WR – Kamau Peterson, Edmonton Eskimos
- WR – Ken-Yon Rambo, Calgary Stampeders
- WR – Geroy Simon, BC Lions
- RB – Joffrey Reynolds, Calgary Stampeders
- RB – Wes Cates, Saskatchewan Roughriders
- OT – Jason Jimenez, BC Lions
- OT – Rob Murphy, BC Lions
- OG – Patrick Kabongo, Edmonton Eskimos
- OG – Gene Makowsky, Saskatchewan Roughriders
- C – Rob Lazeo, Calgary Stampeders

=== Defence ===
- DE – Brent Johnson, BC Lions
- DE – Cameron Wake, BC Lions
- DT – Aaron Hunt, BC Lions
- DT – Dario Romero, Edmonton Eskimos
- LB – Javier Glatt, BC Lions
- LB – Anton McKenzie, Saskatchewan Roughriders
- LB – Maurice Lloyd, Saskatchewan Roughriders
- DB – Korey Banks, BC Lions
- DB – Jason Goss, Edmonton Eskimos
- CB – Brandon Browner, Calgary Stampeders
- CB – Dante Marsh, BC Lions
- DS – Barron Miles, BC Lions

=== Special teams ===
- K – Sandro DeAngelis, Calgary Stampeders
- P – Paul McCallum, BC Lions
- ST – Ian Smart, BC Lions

== 2008 Eastern All-Stars ==
=== Offence ===
- QB – Anthony Calvillo, Montreal Alouettes
- WR – Arland Bruce, Toronto Argonauts
- WR – Ben Cahoon, Montreal Alouettes
- WR – Jamel Richardson, Montreal Alouettes
- WR – Kerry Watkins, Montreal Alouettes
- RB – Avon Cobourne, Montreal Alouettes
- RB – Fred Reid, Winnipeg Blue Bombers
- OT – Josh Bourke, Montreal Alouettes
- OT – Dan Goodspeed, Winnipeg Blue Bombers
- OG – Scott Flory, Montreal Alouettes
- OG – Paul Lambert, Montreal Alouettes
- C – Bryan Chiu, Montreal Alouettes

=== Defence ===
- DE – Jonathan Brown, Toronto Argonauts
- DE – Gavin Walls, Winnipeg Blue Bombers
- DT – Keron Williams, Montreal Alouettes
- DT – Doug Brown, Winnipeg Blue Bombers
- LB – T. J. Hill, Montreal Alouettes
- LB – Zeke Moreno, Winnipeg Blue Bombers
- LB – Markeith Knowlton, Hamilton Tiger-Cats
- DB – Kelly Malveaux, Winnipeg Blue Bombers
- DB – Chris Thompson, Hamilton Tiger-Cats
- CB – Mark Estelle, Montreal Alouettes
- CB – Davis Sanchez, Montreal Alouettes
- DS – Kenny Wheaton, Toronto Argonauts

=== Special teams ===
- K – Damon Duval, Montreal Alouettes
- P – Nick Setta, Hamilton Tiger-Cats
- ST – Dominique Dorsey, Toronto Argonauts

== 2008 CFLPA Pro Player All-Stars ==
=== Offence ===
- QB – Anthony Calvillo, Montreal Alouettes
- OT – Wayne A. Smith, Saskatchewan Roughriders
- OT – Patrick Kabongo, Edmonton Eskimos
- OG – Gene Makowsky, Saskatchewan Roughriders
- OG – Scott Flory, Montreal Alouettes
- C – Marwan Hage, Hamilton Tiger Cats
- RB – Wes Cates, Saskatchewan Roughriders
- FB – Mathieu Bertrand, Edmonton Eskimos
- SB – Geroy Simon, BC Lions
- SB – Jamal Richardson, Montreal Alouettes
- WR – Ken-Yon Rambo, Calgary Stampeders
- WR – Kerry Watkins, Montreal Alouettes

=== Defence ===
- DE – Cameron Wake. BC Lions
- DE – Brent Johnson. BC Lions
- DT – Keron Williams. Montreal Alouettes
- DT – Doug Brown. Winnipeg Blue Bombers
- LB – Maurice Lloyd. Saskatchewan Roughriders
- LB – Jojuan Armour. Calgary Stampeders
- LB – Ezekiel Moreno. Winnipeg Blue Bombers
- CB – Brandon Browner. Calgary Stampeders
- CB – Dante Marsh. BC Lions
- HB – Jason Goss. Edmonton Eskimos
- HB – Korey Banks. BC Lions
- S – Barron Miles. BC Lions

=== Special teams ===
- K – Sandro DeAngelis, Calgary Stampeders
- ST – Dominique Dorsey, Toronto Argonauts
- P – Damon Duval, Montreal Alouettes
- P – Nick Setta, Hamilton Tiger-Cats

=== Head coach ===
- Marc Trestman, Montreal Alouettes

== 2008 CFL awards ==
- CFL's Most Outstanding Player Award – Anthony Calvillo (QB), Montreal Alouettes
- CFL's Most Outstanding Canadian Award – Kamau Peterson (WR), Edmonton Eskimos
- CFL's Most Outstanding Defensive Player Award – Cameron Wake (DE), BC Lions
- CFL's Most Outstanding Offensive Lineman Award – Scott Flory (OG), Montreal Alouettes
- CFL's Most Outstanding Rookie Award – Weston Dressler (SB), Saskatchewan Roughriders
- John Agro Special Teams Award – Dominique Dorsey (RB), Toronto Argonauts
- Tom Pate Memorial Award – Jeremy O'Day (C), Saskatchewan Roughriders
- Annis Stukus Trophy – John Hufnagel, Calgary Stampeders
- Commissioner's Award – Ron Lancaster - Outstanding career with several CFL teams as Player, Coach, & CBC broadcaster
- Hugh Campbell Distinguished Leadership Award - no recipient
