= 2008 BC Lions season =

Canadian football team season

- Owner: David Braley
- General manager: Wally Buono
- President: Bob Ackles (until his death on July 6)
- Head coach: Wally Buono
- Home stadium: BC Place Stadium

Results
- Record: 11–7
- Division place: 3rd, West
- Playoffs: Lost West Final
- Team MOP: Cameron Wake
- Team MOR: Stefan Logan

Uniform

The 2008 BC Lions season was the 51st season for the team in the Canadian Football League (CFL) and their 55th overall. The Lions finished the season in third place in the West Division with an 11–7 record and appeared in the West Final, losing to the eventual Grey Cup champion Calgary Stampeders.

== Offseason ==
=== CFL draft ===
In the 2008 CFL Draft, 48 players were chosen from among 752 eligible players from Canadian universities across the country, as well as Canadian players playing in the NCAA. The first two rounds were broadcast on TSN.ca with host Rod Black.

Round	Pick	Player	Position	School/Club team
1	5	Justin Sorensen	OL	South Carolina
2	9 (via Hamilton)	Rolly Lumbala	RB	Idaho
3	18 (via Edmonton)	Justin Shaw	DL	Manitoba
3	20 (via Saskatchewan via Montreal)	Jason Arakgi	LB	McMaster
3	22	Mike McEachern	LB	Western Illinois
5	38	Brady Browne	DB	Manitoba
6	46	Hubert Buydens	OL	Saskatchewan

== Preseason ==
Week	Date	Opponent	Score	Result	Attendance	Record
A	June 13	at Saskatchewan Roughriders	33–13	Loss	28,800	0–1
B	June 19	Calgary Stampeders	39–35	Win	26,242	1–1

# Games played with white uniforms.

== Regular season ==
- On September 13, Lions running back and former Blue Bomber, Charles Roberts reached over 10,000 rushing yards in his CFL career versus the Saskatchewan Roughriders.
- On July 6, Bobby Ackles, an integral member of the B.C. Lions for more than 50 years, died of a heart attack at his family's cabin on Bowen Island. Ackles started with the team as a waterboy in 1954. Ackles was sixty nine years old. Under Ackles' leadership, the Lions captured the Grey Cup in 1985 and in 2006.
- On September 20, an unsportsmanlike incident occurred during a game in Saskatchewan. It started in the fourth quarter when Saskatchewan fans became angry about a B.C. play they thought should have been a face mask penalty. Lions defensive back Dante Marsh fired the ball into the stands, and Saskatchewan fans responded by pelting the Lions with full cans of beer. The incident occurred on the night when the Roughriders were honouring past CFL legend Ron Lancaster, who had recently died at the age of 69.
- On November 1, B.C. Lions kick returner Ian Smart set a new CFL record for most kickoff return yardage.

=== Season standings ===
West Division
Team	GP	W	L	T	PF	PA	Pts	
Calgary Stampeders	18	13	5	0	595	420	26	Details
Saskatchewan Roughriders	18	12	6	0	500	471	24	Details
BC Lions	18	11	7	0	559	479	22	Details
Edmonton Eskimos	18	10	8	0	512	536	20	Details

=== Season schedule ===
Week	Date	Opponent	Score	Result	Attendance	Record
1	June 26	at Calgary Stampeders	28–18	Loss	30,159	0–1
2	July 4	Saskatchewan Roughriders	26–16	Loss	33,813	0–2
3	July 11	at Winnipeg Blue Bombers	42–24	Win	26,735	1–2
4	July 18	Winnipeg Blue Bombers	27–18	Win	37,174	2–2
5	July 25	Montreal Alouettes	36–34	Win	30,132	3–2
6	July 31	at Edmonton Eskimos	35–24	Loss	35,008	3–3
7	Aug 8	Edmonton Eskimos	40–34	Win	30,863	4–3
8	Bye					4–3
9	Aug 22	Calgary Stampeders	36–29	Loss	34,221	4–4
10	Aug 29	at Montreal Alouettes	30–25	Loss	20,202	4–5
11	Sept 6	at Hamilton Tiger-Cats	35–12	Win	18,723	5–5
12	Sept 13	Saskatchewan Roughriders	28–23	Win	38,608	6–5
13	Sept 20	at Saskatchewan Roughriders	27–21	Win	30,945	7–5
14	Sept 27	Hamilton Tiger-Cats	40–10	Win	31,161	8–5
15	Oct 3	at Toronto Argonauts	24–20	Win	28,273	9–5
16	Oct 10	Edmonton Eskimos	27–20	Loss	34,778	9–6
17	Oct 17	at Edmonton Eskimos	43–28	Win	34,342	10–6
18	Oct 25	Toronto Argonauts	55–32	Win	35,994	11–6
19	Nov 1	at Calgary Stampeders	41–30	Loss	30,275	11–7

# Games played with colour uniforms.
# Games played with white uniforms.
# Games played with alternate uniforms.

== Roster ==
2008 BC Lions final roster
Quarterbacks: 12 Zac Champion; 7 Jarious Jackson; 16 Buck Pierce; Running backs: 37 Alexis Bwenge; 28 Lyle Green; 26 Stefan Logan; 46 Rolly Lumbala; 2 Ian Smart; Receivers: 8 Bret Anderson K; 82 Jason Clermont; 13 Ryan Grice-Mullen; 19 Paris Jackson; 81 Geroy Simon; 88 O'Neil Wilson	Offensive linemen: 59 Kelly Bates G; 55 Sherko Haji-Rasouli G; 67 Jon Hameister-Ries G/T; 60 Jason Jimenez T; 56 Rob Murphy T; 64 Angus Reid C; 54 Dean Valli G; Defensive linemen: 95 Ricky Foley DE; 90 Aaron Hunt DT; 97 Brent Johnson DE; 93 Matt Kirk DT; 91 Cameron Wake DE; 96 Tyrone Williams DT; Special teams: 4 Paul McCallum K/P; 70 Dan McCullough LS	Linebackers: 45 Jason Arakgi OLB; 35 Otis Floyd OLB; 6 Javier Glatt MLB; 39 Jamall Johnson OLB; 51 Terna Nande MLB; 11 Jason Pottinger OLB/MLB; Defensive backs: 24 Korey Banks DH; 3 Tad Crawford S; 25 Jerome Dennis DH; 27 Lavar Glover CB; 31 Dante Marsh CB; 9 Barron Miles S; 21 Ryan Phillips DH; 32 B. J. Tucker CB	Practice Roster: 34 Donald Brown DH; 83 Greg Hetherington SB; 79 Caesar Rayford DE; 94 Justin Shaw DE; 87 Rufus Skillern WR; 10 Sean Whyte K/P; Reserve roster: 89 Clarence Coleman WR; 72 Jeremy Gibbs DT; 69 Lorne Plante C; 63 Walter Stith T; Injured list: 1 Charles Roberts RB; 18 Cory Rodgers WR; Italics indicate American players

== Player stats ==
=== Passing ===
Player	Att.	Comp	%	Yards	TD	INT	Rating
Buck Pierce	362	232	64.1	3018	19	9	97.4
Jarious Jackson	288	158	54.9	2164	17	10	84.3
Paul McCallum	2	2	100.0	53	0	0	158.3
Zac Champion	3	2	66.7	11	1	0	158.3
Charles Roberts	1	0	0.0	0	0	0	2.1
Stefan Logan	1	0	0.0	0	0	0	2.1

=== Rushing ===
Player	Att.	Yards	Avg.	TD	Fumbles
Stefan Logan	122	889	7.3	0	4
Jarious Jackson	63	362	5.7	2	4
Charles Roberts	65	298	4.6	5	1
Joe Smith	55	236	4.3	3	0
Buck Pierce	29	177	6.1	2	2

=== Receiving ===
Player	No.	Yards	Avg.	Long	TD
Geroy Simon	82	1418	17.3	79	10
Paris Jackson	76	1180	15.5	56	8
Jason Clermont	50	640	12.8	36	3
Stefan Logan	52	477	9.2	31	3
Clarence Coleman	34	389	11.4	39	3

== Awards and records ==
- Cameron Wake (DE), British Columbia Lions – CFL's Most Outstanding Defensive Player Award
- Cameron Wake, Norm Fieldgate Trophy

=== 2008 CFL All-Stars ===
- Brent Johnson, Defensive Tackle
- Aaron Hunt, Defensive Tackle
- Jason Jimenez, Offensive Tackle
- Dante Marsh, Cornerback
- Barron Miles, Safety
- Geroy Simon, Receiver
- Cameron Wake, Defensive End

=== Western Division All-Star Selections ===
- Korey Banks, Defensive Back
- Javier Glatt, Linebacker
- Aaron Hunt, Defensive Tackle
- Paris Jackson, Receiver
- Jason Jimenez, Offensive Tackle
- Brent Johnson, Defensive Tackle
- Dante Marsh, Cornerback
- Paul McCallum, Punter
- Barron Miles, Safety
- Rob Murphy, Offensive Tackle
- Geroy Simon, Receiver
- Ian Smart, Special Teams
- Cameron Wake, Defensive End

== Playoffs ==
Week	Game	Date	Opponent	Score	Result	Attendance
20	West Semi-Final	Nov 8	at Saskatchewan Roughriders	33–12	Win	30,945
21	West Final	Nov 15	at Calgary Stampeders	22–18	Loss	35,650

# Games played with white uniforms.

=== West Semi-Final ===
Date and time: Saturday, November 8, 3:30 PM Central Standard Time
Venue: Mosaic Stadium at Taylor Field, Regina, Saskatchewan

Team	Q1	Q2	Q3	Q4	Total
BC Lions	7	9	10	7	33
Saskatchewan Roughriders	0	6	3	3	12

=== West Final ===
Date and time: Saturday, November 15, 2:30 PM Mountain Standard Time
Venue: McMahon Stadium, Calgary, Alberta

Team	Q1	Q2	Q3	Q4	Total
BC Lions	6	6	3	3	18
Calgary Stampeders	0	9	6	7	22
