= 2011 BC Lions season =

Canadian football team season

- General manager: Wally Buono
- Head coach: Wally Buono
- Home stadium: Empire Field; BC Place Stadium

Results
- Record: 11–7
- Division place: 1st, West
- Playoffs: Won Grey Cup
- Team MOP: Travis Lulay
- Team MOC: Paul McCallum
- Team MOR: Tim Brown

Uniform

The 2011 BC Lions season was the 54th season for the team in the Canadian Football League (CFL) and their 58th overall. The Lions finished in first place in the West Division with an 11–7 record. The Lions won their sixth Grey Cup championship over the Winnipeg Blue Bombers by a score of 34–23. The Lions became the first team in league history to start a season 0–5 and finish in first place. They also became the first team to lose their first five regular season games and win the Grey Cup. The Lions were also the first team to win a Grey Cup championship in their home stadium since the 1994 BC Lions and were only the fourth team to win at home since the inception of the Canadian Football League in 1958. Because of their remarkable season, the Lions were named the Canadian Press Team of the Year for 2011, becoming only the second CFL team to win the award since 1983.

The Lions opened their training camp at Hillside Stadium in Kamloops, British Columbia with rookie camp beginning June 1 and main camp beginning on June 5. Due to ongoing construction at BC Place Stadium, the Lions played their first five regular season games at Empire Field before moving to BC Place for the remaining four. On October 10, 2011, the Lions clinched a playoff berth after the Saskatchewan Roughriders lost their game to the Edmonton Eskimos. This extends the franchise record to 15 straight years in the playoffs, with that mark also tied for fourth-best in CFL history.

== Offseason ==
=== BC Place construction ===
Due to the continued construction of BC Place Stadium, the Lions started their season at Empire Field, the temporary stadium that they played in for all ten games in 2010. However, it was unclear as to when the Lions would move into the refurbished stadium, as the contractor, PCL Westcoast Constructor, would not reveal a date. It was likely that between three and five regular season games would be played at BC Place Stadium and it has been guaranteed that it will be complete by November 1, in time for the 99th Grey Cup, which it is scheduled to host.

On February 7, 2011, it was announced that the BC Lions would be opening the newly renovated BC Place on September 30, 2011. When the schedule was released on February 18, 2011, it was announced that the Lions' opponent would be the Edmonton Eskimos and that they would play four 2011 regular season games in BC Place Stadium.

=== CFL draft ===
The 2011 CFL draft took place on Sunday, May 8, 2011. The Lions had five selections in the draft, with the first coming in the sixth spot overall, after trading their third overall pick with Calgary. Through the trade, BC was still able to select their first choice, Marco Iannuzzi, with their first pick and then draft kicker/punter Hugh O'Neill to replace the recently traded Sean Whyte. BC also selected Alex Ellis in the 2011 supplemental draft, and must forfeit a sixth-round 2012 draft pick.

Round	Pick	Player	Position	School/Club team
1	6	Marco Iannuzzi	WR	Harvard
2	11	Hugh O'Neill	K/P	Alberta
3	19	Michael Carter	DB	Maryland
5	37	Yannick Sage	OL	Sherbrooke
6	42	Chris Hodgson	DL	Saint Mary's

== Preseason ==
Week	Date	Opponent	Score	Result	Attendance	Record
A	Wed, June 15	at Calgary Stampeders	24–0	Win	8,235	1–0
B	Wed, June 22	vs. Saskatchewan Roughriders	34–6	Win	18,742	2–0

# Games played with white uniforms.

== Regular season ==
=== Standings ===
West Division
Team	GP	W	L	T	PF	PA	Pts	
BC Lions	18	11	7	0	511	385	22	Details
Edmonton Eskimos	18	11	7	0	427	401	22	Details
Calgary Stampeders	18	11	7	0	511	476	22	Details
Saskatchewan Roughriders	18	5	13	0	346	482	10	Details

=== Season schedule ===
- The Lions played their first five regular season games at Empire Field and played their remaining four at BC Place Stadium.

Week	Date	Opponent	Score	Result	Attendance	Record
1	Thurs, June 30	at Montreal Alouettes	30–26	Loss	22,317	0–1
2	Fri, July 8	vs. Calgary Stampeders	34–32	Loss	22,738	0–2
3	Sat, July 16	at Edmonton Eskimos	33–17	Loss	32,297	0–3
4	Fri, July 22	vs. Hamilton Tiger-Cats	39–31	Loss	24,117	0–4
5	Thurs, July 28	at Winnipeg Blue Bombers	25–20	Loss	29,533	0–5
6	Fri, Aug 5	vs. Saskatchewan Roughriders	24–11	Win	25,238	1–5
7	Sat, Aug 13	vs. Winnipeg Blue Bombers	30–17	Loss	24,131	1–6
8	Fri, Aug 19	at Edmonton Eskimos	36–1	Win	35,216	2–6
9	Bye					2–6
10	Fri, Sept 2	at Toronto Argonauts	29–16	Win	19,593	3–6
11	Sat, Sept 10	vs. Toronto Argonauts	28–6	Win	25,263	4–6
12	Sat, Sept 17	at Calgary Stampeders	32–19	Win	29,929	5–6
13	Sat, Sept 24	at Saskatchewan Roughriders	42–5	Win	30,048	6–6
14	Fri, Sept 30	vs. Edmonton Eskimos	33–24	Win	50,213	7–6
15	Sat, Oct 8	vs. Calgary Stampeders	33–31	Win	30,622	8–6
16	Sun, Oct 16	at Saskatchewan Roughriders	29–18	Win	30,048	9–6
17	Sat, Oct 22	at Hamilton Tiger-Cats	42–10	Loss	25,536	9–7
18	Sat, Oct 29	vs. Edmonton Eskimos	29–20	Win	29,749	10–7
19	Sat, Nov 5	vs. Montreal Alouettes	43–1	Win	35,454	11–7

# Games played with colour uniforms.
# Games played with white uniforms.
# Games played with alternate uniforms.

== Roster ==
2011 BC Lions final roster
Quarterbacks: 7 Jarious Jackson; 14 Travis Lulay; 13 Mike Reilly; Running backs: 35 Tim Brown; 33 Andrew Harris; 23 Jamall Lee; 46 Rolly Lumbala; Receivers: 1 Arland Bruce; 85 Shawn Gore; 87 Marco Iannuzzi; 19 Paris Jackson; 10 Kierrie Johnson; 81 Geroy Simon; 8 Ryan Thelwell	Offensive linemen: 65 Ben Archibald T; 67 Jon Hameister-Ries G/T; 57 Andrew Jones G; 53 Jesse Newman G; 63 Jovan Olafioye T; 64 Angus Reid C; 54 Dean Valli G; Defensive linemen: 90 Aaron Hunt DT; 97 Brent Johnson DE; 96 Khalif Mitchell DT; 94 Khreem Smith DE; 79 Eric Taylor DT; 9 Keron Williams DE	Linebackers: 45 Jason Arakgi; 50 Adam Bighill; 56 Solomon Elimimian; 42 Anton McKenzie; 36 Neil McKinlay; 47 James Yurichuk; Defensive backs: 24 Korey Banks; 11 Tad Kornegay; 27 J. R. LaRose; 31 Dante Marsh; 3 Cauchy Muamba; 21 Ryan Phillips; 26 Anthony Reddick	Special teams: 4 Paul McCallum K/P; 70 Dan McCullough LS; Practice roster: 61 Adam Baboulas G/C; 40 Tim Cronk FB; 76 Rajon Henley DE; 49 Amara Kamara LB; 83 Nick Moore WR; 29 Rafael Priest DB; 17 Jock Sanders RB/SB; 86 Courtney Taylor WR; 98 Teryl White DT	Reserve roster: 20 Jerome Dennis DB; 87 Akeem Foster WR; 41 Hamid Mahmoudi DB; 25 Jamal Robertson RB; Injured list: 6 Stanley Franks DB; 51 Joash Gesse LB; 44 Adam Leonard LB; 18 Hugh O'Neill K/P; 2 Davis Sanchez DB; 28 J. R. Ruffin DB; Italics indicate American players. Roster updated 2026-04-27; Depth chart • Transactions

== Coaching staff ==
2011 BC Lions staff
Front office: Owner – David Braley; President & CEO – Dennis Skulsky; General manager – Wally Buono; Director of player personnel – Roy Shivers; Player personnel coordinator and assistant to gm – Neil McEvoy; Player personal assistant – Barron Miles; Northwest regional scout – Jeff Smith; Head coaches: Head coach – Wally Buono; Offensive coaches: Offensive coordinator and quarterbacks – Jacques Chapdelaine; Receivers – Travis Moore; Running backs – Chuck McMann; Offensive line – Dan Dorazio; Offensive line assistant – Kelly Bates	Defensive coaches: Defensive coordinator and linebackers – Mike Benevides; Defensive line – Randy Melvin; Defensive backs – Mark Washington; Defensive assistant – Barron Miles; Special teams coaches: Special teams coordinator – Chuck McMann; Strength and conditioning: Strength and conditioning trainer – Chris Boyko; → Coaching staff

== Player stats ==
=== Passing ===
Player	Att.	Comp	%	Yards	TD	INT	Rating
Travis Lulay	583	342	58.7	4,815	32	11	95.8
Jarious Jackson	39	18	46.2	263	1	2	55.8
Mike Reilly	2	1	50.0	12	0	0	68.8
Paul McCallum	2	0	00.0	0	0	2	−414.6

=== Rushing ===
Player	Att.	Yards	Avg.	TD	Fumbles
Andrew Harris	96	458	4.8	1	2
Travis Lulay	47	391	8.3	3	1
Tim Brown	64	376	5.9	5	3
Jamal Robertson	63	296	4.7	3	0
Shawn Gore	12	85	7.1	0	1
Jarious Jackson	22	80	3.6	0	2
Kierrie Johnson	7	53	7.6	0	0

=== Receiving ===
Player	No.	Yards	Avg.	Long	TD
Geroy Simon	84	1,350	16.1	63	8
Arland Bruce	58	859	14.8	100	8
Shawn Gore	60	836	13.9	51	1
Akeem Foster	33	593	18.0	56	6
Andrew Harris	30	395	13.2	63	7
Kierrie Johnson	20	235	11.8	29	0

== Awards and records ==
- CFL's Most Outstanding Player Award – Travis Lulay, QB
- John Agro Special Teams Award – Paul McCallum, K/P

=== 2011 CFL All-Stars ===
- QB – Travis Lulay, CFL All-Star
- WR – Geroy Simon, CFL All-Star
- OT – Jovan Olafioye, CFL All-Star
- OC – Angus Reid, CFL All-Star
- DT – Aaron Hunt, CFL All-Star
- DT – Khalif Mitchell, CFL All-Star
- LB – Solomon Elimimian, CFL All-Star
- DB – Korey Banks, CFL All-Star
- K – Paul McCallum, CFL All-Star

=== Western All-Stars ===
- QB – Travis Lulay, Western All-Star
- WR – Geroy Simon, Western All-Star
- OT – Ben Archibald, Western All-Star
- OT – Jovan Olafioye, Western All-Star
- OC – Angus Reid, Western All-Star
- DT – Aaron Hunt, Western All-Star
- DT – Khalif Mitchell, Western All-Star
- DE – Keron Williams, Western All-Star
- LB – Solomon Elimimian, Western All-Star
- CB – Dante Marsh, Western All-Star
- DB – Korey Banks, Western All-Star
- K – Paul McCallum, Western All-Star

=== Milestones ===
- On September 10, 2011, Lions receiver Geroy Simon became the franchise's all-time touchdowns leader when he scored his 88th touchdown as a BC Lion, surpassing Willie Fleming.

== Playoffs ==
=== Schedule ===
Week	Game	Date	Time	Opponent	Score	Result	Attendance
20	Bye						
21	West Final	Nov 20	1:30 PM PST	vs. Edmonton Eskimos	40–23	Win	41,313
22	Grey Cup	Nov 27	3:30 PM PST	Winnipeg Blue Bombers	34–23	Win	54,313

# Games played with colour uniforms.

=== Bracket ===
November 13: Division Semi-Finals
East
E3	Hamilton Tiger-Cats	52*
E2	Montreal Alouettes	44
West
W3	Calgary Stampeders	19
W2	Edmonton Eskimos	33

November 20: Division Finals
E3	Hamilton Tiger-Cats	3
E1	Winnipeg Blue Bombers	19
W2	Edmonton Eskimos	23
W1	BC Lions	40

November 27: 99th Grey Cup; BC Place Stadium – Vancouver
E1	Winnipeg Blue Bombers	23
W1	BC Lions	34

*-Team won in Overtime.

=== West Final ===
Edmonton at BC

Team	1	2	3	4	Total
Eskimos	0	3	6	14	23
• Lions	6	20	7	7	40

- Date: November 20
- Location: BC Place Stadium
  Vancouver, BC
- Game start: 1:30 PM PST
- Game attendance: 41,313
- Game weather: None (Retractable roof closed)
- Referee: Glen Johnson
- TV announcers (TSN): Chris Cuthbert (Play by Play), Glen Suitor (Colour), Farhan Lalji (Sideline)

=== Grey Cup ===
Winnipeg vs. BC

Team	1	2	3	4	Total
Blue Bombers	0	6	3	14	23
• Lions	11	3	10	10	34

- Date: November 27
- Location: BC Place Stadium
  Vancouver, BC
- Game start: 3:30 PM PST
- Game attendance: 54,313
- Game weather: None (Retractable roof closed)
- Referee: Andre Proulx
- TV announcers (TSN): Chris Cuthbert (Play by Play), Glen Suitor (Colour), Farhan Lalji (Sideline), Sara Orlesky (Sideline), Duane Forde (Sideline)
