= Geroy Simon =

American gridiron football player and executive (born 1975)

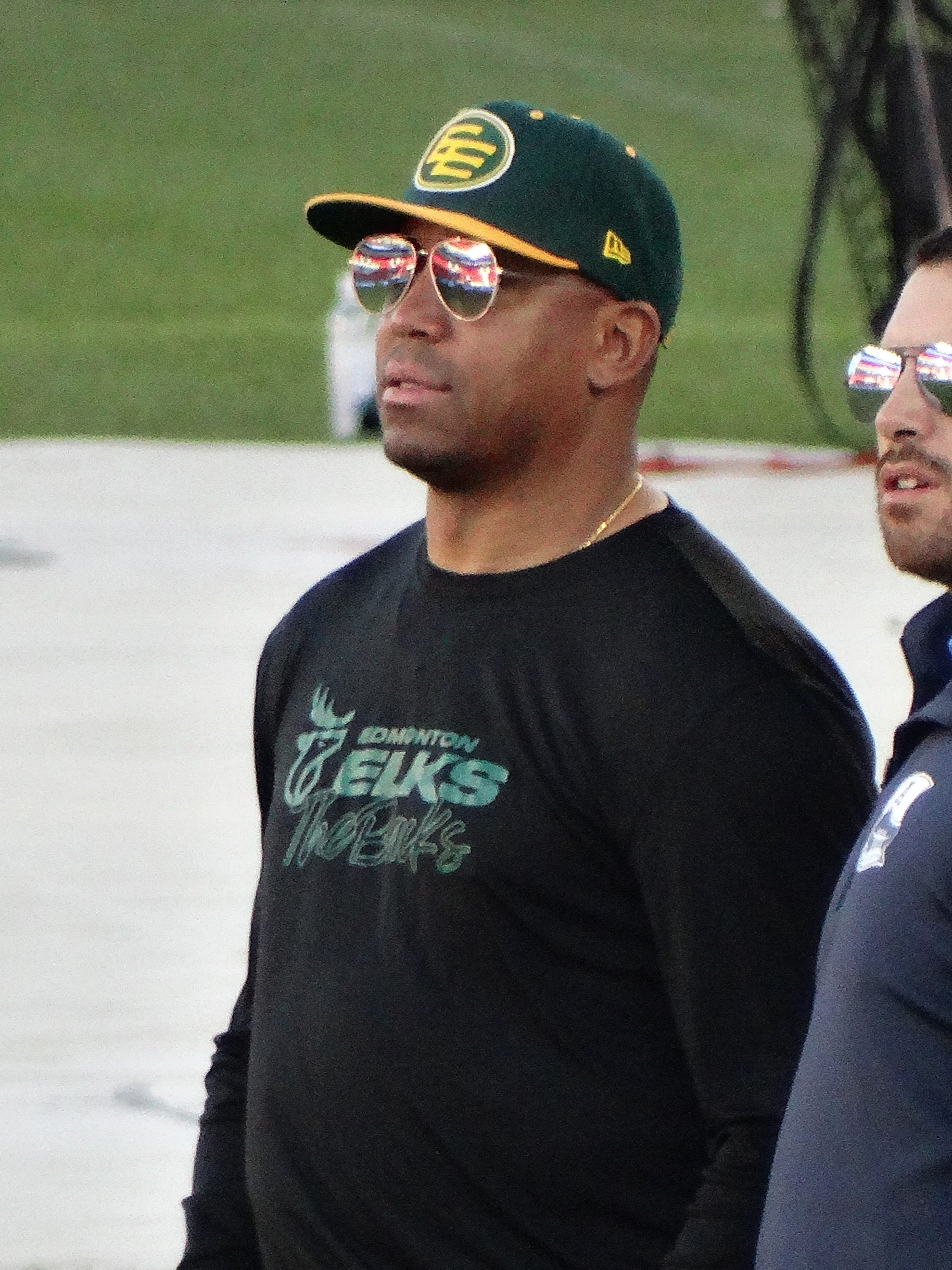
- Simon with the Edmonton Elks in 2023

Maryland Terrapins
- Title: Executive director of revenue share management and general manager

Personal information
- Born: 11 September 1975 (age 51); Johnstown, Pennsylvania, U.S.
- Listed height: 6 ft 2 in (1.88 m)
- Listed weight: 198 lb (90 kg)

Career information
- Position: Slotback (No. 81)
- College: Maryland

Career history

Playing
- Cincinnati Bengals (1997)*; Philadelphia Eagles (1997)*; Pittsburgh Steelers (1997)*; Tampa Bay Buccaneers (1997–1998)*; Winnipeg Blue Bombers (1999–2000); Kansas City Chiefs (2001)*; BC Lions (2001–2012); Saskatchewan Roughriders (2013)
- * Offseason or practice squad member only

Operations
- Saskatchewan Roughriders (2014) Area scout; BC Lions (2015–2016) Player business developmental advisor; BC Lions (2017) Director of CIS scouting & personnel assistant; BC Lions (2018–2019) Director of Canadian scouting & CFL draft coordinator; BC Lions (2020–2021) Director of global scouting & U.S. regional scout; Edmonton Elks (2022–2024) Assistant general manager; Edmonton Elks (2024) Interim general manager; Maryland (2025) Executive director of revenue share management and general manager

Awards and highlights
- 3× Grey Cup champion (2006, 2011, 2013); 6× CFL All-Star (2003, 2004, 2006–2008, 2011); 7× CFL West All-Star (2003, 2004, 2006–2009, 2011); CFL's Most Outstanding Player (2006); Rogers Fans' Choice Award (2006); Jeff Nicklin Memorial Trophy (2006); Second-team All-ACC (1994); BC Lions Wall of Fame; BC Lions #81 retired; CFL records: Most career receiving yards (16,352)

Career CFL statistics
- Games played: 238
- Receptions: 1,029
- Receiving yards: 16,352
- Touchdown receptions: 103
- Canadian Football Hall of Fame

Geroy Simon (born September 11, 1975) is an American football executive and former player who is the executive director of revenue share management and general manager of the Maryland Terrapins football team. He played in 15 seasons at slotback in the Canadian Football League, twelve of them with the BC Lions. He won the CFL's Most Outstanding Player Award in 2006 while also winning three Grey Cup championships; with the BC Lions in 2006 and 2011 and with Saskatchewan in 2013. As of the 2026 CFL season, Simon is still the all-time career leader in CFL receiving yards with 16,352 yards, second in pass receptions with 1,029 and third in touchdown receptions with 103. He was inducted into the Canadian Football Hall of Fame in 2017. Following his playing career, Simon was an executive in the Canadian Football League and was the interim general manager of the Edmonton Elks in 2024.

== College career ==
Simon finished second on the University of Maryland's all-time charts for receptions (185) and receiving yards (2,059), and caught 10 career touchdown passes. As a senior, he caught 35 passes for 534 yards and 3 touchdowns. He had his best season as a sophomore, setting an ACC record with 77 catches for 891 yards and 5 touchdowns. That season, he also returned a kickoff 94 yards for a touchdown.

== Professional career ==
=== Pittsburgh Steelers ===
1997: Spent part of the 1997 season on the NFL's Pittsburgh Steelers practice squad.

=== Winnipeg Blue Bombers ===
1999–2000: Saw some time at slotback and wide receiver for the Winnipeg Blue Bombers, playing in 10 games in 1999 and all 18 regular season games in 2000. Simon caught 51 passes for 725 yards and 7 TDs in 2000, all career numbers at the time.

=== BC Lions ===
2001: Joined the BC Lions as a free agent and served as a backup at the slotback position, seeing time in 6 games.

2002: Led the Lions with 50 receptions in his first full season in the starting lineup, finishing with 754 yards. He also threw for a 71-yard touchdown toss in his only attempt of the season. He established career highs in kick returns with 51 punt returns for 464 yards, 19 kickoff returns for 385 yards and six missed field goal returns for 128 yards.

2003: Recorded his first 1,000-yard receiving season with 1687 yards and was named both a Western and a CFL All-Star for the first time in his career. Named Offensive Player of the Week for Week #16. He also scored his first two-point conversion on a five-yard reception. For the second consecutive season, he threw a touchdown pass, this time for 52 yards. He also had a career-high seven carries for 135 yards and one rushing touchdown.

2004: Became the third Lions player to record 100 receptions in a season with 103 catches. He broke Darren Flutie's BC Lions team record for single season receiving with 1,750 yards. Caught 3 passes for 31 yards in the 2004 Grey Cup. Received his second straight Western and CFL All-Star berth and was named Offensive Player of the Week in Week #9.

2005: Led the Lions in receiving (both yards and receptions) for the third straight season. Ranked 4th in the CFL in receiving yards with 1,322 and 5th in receptions with 89. Set an all-time Lions playoff record with a 90-yard reception for a touchdown against Edmonton in the 2005 West Final.

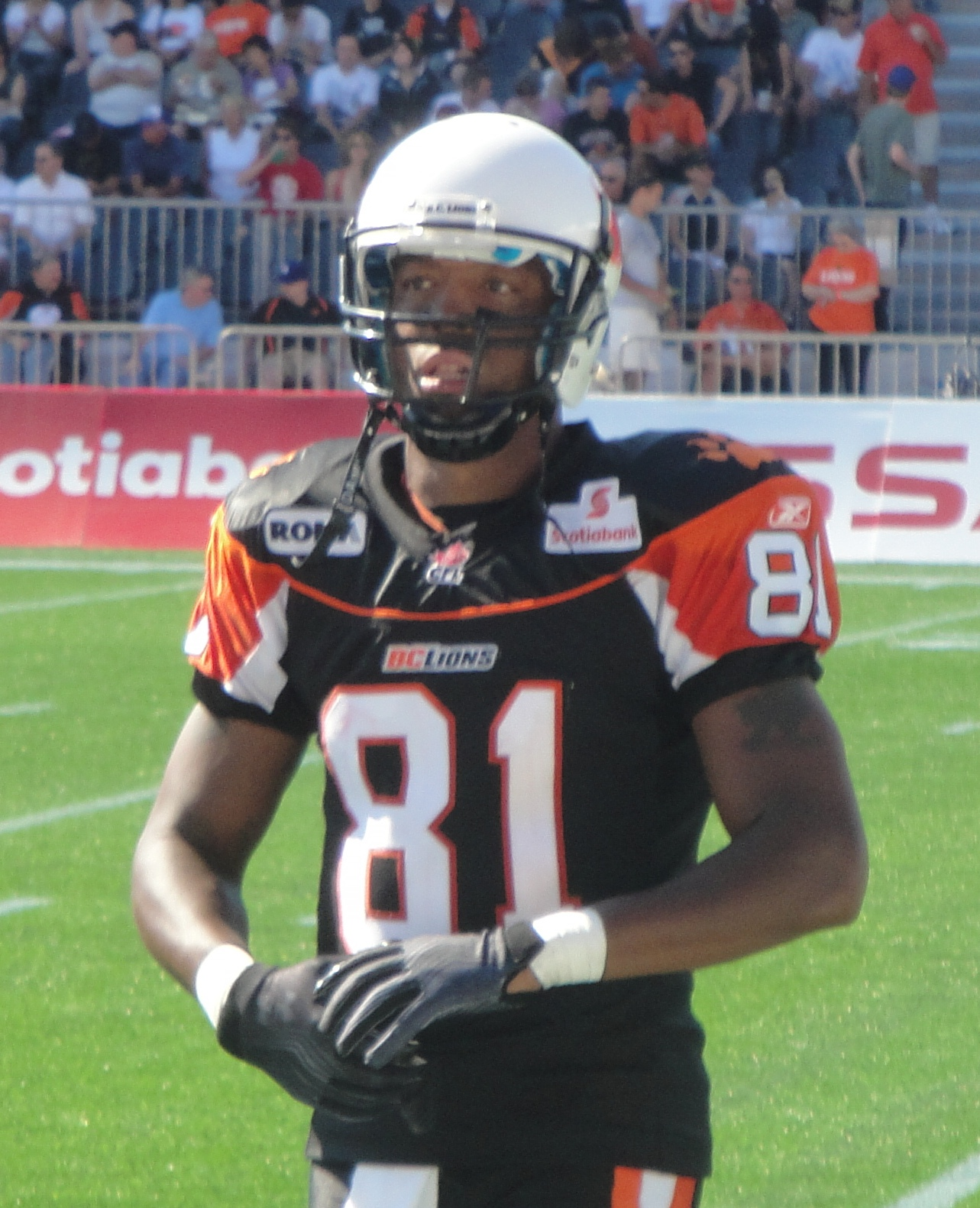
Simon with the BC Lions in 2011.

2006: Simon led the CFL in receiving yards and receptions, with 1,856 yards on 105 receptions and 15 touchdowns, all of which are career highs. Consequently, he broke his own team receiving yards record that he set in 2004. He also tied the CFL record for most 100-yard receiving games in a season with 11. Evidenced by his dominant play, Simon was named the CFL Offensive Player of the Month for both September and October. For his efforts on the season, Simon was named the Most Outstanding Player of the CFL for the 2006 season. He capped off the season by contributing four catches for 41 yards in the BC Lions' 2006 Grey Cup win.

2007: Simon had a difficult start to the season, accumulating only 449 yards and one touchdown through ten games. However, it turned out that he had saved his best for last and caught 38 passes for 859 yards and six touchdowns in the final eight games, incidentally, all wins for the Lions. He set a personal best 18.2-yard average per catch and claimed his second straight receiving title with a 211-yard performance in the final game of the season.

2008: On 25 July 2008, in a home game against the Montreal Alouettes, Simon surpassed Jim "Dirty 30" Young for the number one spot as the Lions all-time receiving yards receiver. He finished the season with 10,262 career receiving yards. He also became the Lions all-time receiving touchdown leader surpassing Young's 65 with his 66th touchdown on 27 September 2008 versus the Hamilton Tiger-Cats. He finished the season with eight 100-yard receiving games and finished second in receiving despite missing two games with injury.

2009: With the release of Jason Clermont before the 2009 CFL season, Simon and Paris Jackson were the only remaining 1,000-yard receivers on the 2009 BC Lions team and Simon routinely faced double and triple coverage by opponents reducing his receptions. Nonetheless, Simon had 79 receptions for 1,239 yards, securing his seventh straight 1,000-yard receiving yards season. This was also his seventh consecutive season in which he led the Lions in receiving yards.

2010: Simon recorded his eighth straight 1,000-yard receiving yard season in 2010, amassing 1,190 yards on 78 catches with six touchdowns.

2011: On 10 September, Simon passed Willie Fleming as the Lions' all-time touchdown leader after he scored his 88th touchdown as a Lion in the last game to be played at Empire Field. He came into the season needing 1417 receiving yards to pass Milt Stegall as the CFL's all-time leader in receiving yardage. While finishing just short, he nonetheless had an all-star season, recording 84 catches for 1350 yards and eight touchdowns. Simon played in the 99th Grey Cup, catching four passes for 79 yards en route to a 34-23 Lions' victory and the second Grey Cup championship of his career.

2012: On 29 June, while playing against the Winnipeg Blue Bombers and with the former record holder Milt Stegall in attendance, Simon became the all-time CFL career reception yards leader.

=== Saskatchewan Roughriders ===
2013: On 24 January, Simon was traded to the Saskatchewan Roughriders in exchange for receiver Justin Harper and Saskatchewan's third round pick in the 2014 CFL draft. On the same day, the Saskatchewan Roughriders signed Simon to a contract for one year plus an option worth $170,000 per year plus bonuses. Geroy Simon missed the first 3 weeks of the 2013 CFL season with a lower body injury. On 17 August 2013 (Week 8) Simon became the 3rd player in CFL history to have 1,000 career receptions: The other players are Ben Cahoon and Terry Vaughn In Week 9 (1 week later) Simon became the first CFL player to have 16,000 receiving yards. In Week 14, against the Montreal Alouettes, Simon became the CFL's all time receptions leader. He surpassed Ben Cahoon's record of 1,017 career receptions. Simon would finish the season on a winning note catching two touchdown passes in the biggest game of the year en route to the Roughriders winning their fourth Grey Cup championship.

On May 31, 2014, Simon announced his retirement from professional football.

== Career statistics ==
Receiving		Regular season						Playoffs
Year	Team	Games	No.	Yards	Avg	Long	TD	Games	No.	Yards	Avg	Long	TD
1999	WPG	10	34	306	9.0	25	0	Team did not qualify
2000	WPG	17	51	725	14.2	80	7	2	4	54	13.5	31	1
2001	BC	6	14	182	13.0	33	1	1	5	56	11.2	32	0
2002	BC	17	50	754	15.1	42	2	1	5	88	17.6	31	0
2003	BC	18	94	1687	17.9	103	13	1	3	11	3.7	5	0
2004	BC	18	103	1750	17.0	89	14	2	8	73	9.1	18	0
2005	BC	18	89	1322	14.9	83	10	1	3	112	37.3	90	1
2006	BC	18	105	1856	17.7	92	15	2	8	75	9.4	13	0
2007	BC	18	72	1308	18.2	96	6	1	5	50	10.0	18	1
2008	BC	16	82	1418	17.3	79	10	2	9	179	19.9	46	1
2009	BC	18	79	1239	15.7	62	6	2	9	141	15.7	48	0
2010	BC	18	78	1190	15.3	98	6	1	4	45	11.3	14	0
2011	BC	18	84	1350	16.1	63	8	2	10	185	18.5	53	1
2012	BC	13	54	700	12.9	56	2	1	6	56	9.3	56	0
2013	SSK	15	40	565	14.1	45	3	3	6	103	17.2	42	2
WPG totals		27	85	1,031	12.1	80	7	2	4	54	13.5	31	1
BC totals		196	904	14,756	16.3	103	93	17	75	1,071	14.3	90	4
SSK totals		15	40	565	14.1	45	3	3	6	103	17.2	42	2
CFL totals		238	1,029	16,352	15.9	103	103	22	85	1,228	14.4	90	7

== Awards and legacy ==
In 2012, in honour of the 100th Grey Cup, Canada Post used his image on a series of commemorative postage stamps. The image was also used on presentation posters and other materials to promote the Grey Cup game and other celebrations associated with the centennial.

The BC Lions retired Simon's #81 in 2014; his number became the tenth number retired by the Lions.

== Executive career ==
After Simon ended his playing career in 2013, he remained with the Saskatchewan Roughriders in a front office role. Simon returned to the BC Lions in 2015 and served as the team's Director for Global Scouting and a US Regional Scout. On December 28, 2021, he was named the assistant general manager of the Edmonton Elks.

On July 15, 2024, following the dismissal of general manager, Chris Jones, Simon was named the team's interim general manager. On November 9, 2024, it was announced that Ed Hervey had been named general manager for the Elks and Simon was not retained.

In 2025, Simon was named executive director of revenue share management and general manager of the Maryland Terrapins football team.

== Personal life ==
Before ultimately choosing football as a career, Simon enjoyed great success as a basketball player at a young age. He also took up baseball and track, but became attracted to football after watching Walter Payton. Envisioning a career in professional football, he accepted a scholarship offer from the University of Maryland. During his spare time, Simon has said that he listens to B.B. King, watches SportsCentre, and plays pool. Simon also coaches his son's minor football team. Simon currently lives in Edmonton for the football season and spends the offseason in Arizona with his fiancée Taryn Dakha.

Simon was together with his wife, Tracy Simon, for 17 years before she died.

His eldest son Gervon, who was born when Geroy was a freshman at Maryland, was formerly the starting quarterback at Greater Johnstown High School - Geroy's alma mater - who finished as the all-time passing yards leader.
