= 2004 BC Lions season =

Canadian football team season

- Owner: David Braley
- General manager: Wally Buono
- President: Bob Ackles
- Head coach: Wally Buono
- Home stadium: BC Place Stadium

Results
- Record: 13–5
- Division place: 1st, West
- Playoffs: Lost Grey Cup
- Team MOP: Casey Printers

Uniform

The 2004 BC Lions finished in first place in the West Division with a 13–5 record. They won the West Final and appeared in the 92nd Grey Cup.

== Offseason ==
=== CFL draft ===
Rd	Pick	Player	Position	School
1	5	O.J. Atogwe	S	Stanford
2	13	Nautyn McKay-Loescher	DE	Alabama
3	22	Scott Plummer	DB	Simon Fraser
5	40	Troy Cunningham	DE	Concordia
6	49	Billy Palmer	TE	Notre Dame

== Preseason ==
Week	Date	Opponent	Score	Result	Attendance	Record
B	June 5	vs. Saskatchewan Roughriders	24–14	Loss	11,874	0–1
C	June 10	at Winnipeg Blue Bombers	39–28	Win	26,470	1–1

== Regular season ==
=== Season standings ===
West Division
Team	GP	W	L	T	PF	PA	Pts	
BC Lions	18	13	5	0	584	436	26	Details
Edmonton Eskimos	18	9	9	0	532	472	18	Details
Saskatchewan Roughriders	18	9	9	0	476	444	18	Details
Winnipeg Blue Bombers	18	7	11	0	448	507	14	Details
Calgary Stampeders	18	4	14	0	396	522	8	Details

=== Season schedule ===
Week	Date	Opponent	Score	Result	Attendance	Record
1	June 18	vs. Hamilton Tiger-Cats	38–36	Loss	20,952	0–1
2	June 26	at Edmonton Eskimos	41–34	Win	35,367	1–1
3	July 2	at Saskatchewan Roughriders	42–29	Loss	21,605	1–2
4	July 9	vs. Edmonton Eskimos	25–9	Loss	22,227	1–3
5	Bye					1–3
6	July 22	at Winnipeg Blue Bombers	48–17	Win	25,567	2–3
7	July 29	vs. Montreal Alouettes	32–9	Win	23,788	3–3
8	August 6	vs. Ottawa Renegades	47–27	Win	25,255	4–3
9	August 13	at Hamilton Tiger-Cats	49–11	Win	27,891	5–3
10	August 21	at Calgary Stampeders	25–18 (OT)	Win	28,351	6–3
11	August 27	vs. Toronto Argonauts	31–10	Win	29,484	7–3
12	Bye					7–3
13	Sept 11	at Ottawa Renegades	31–13	Win	22,380	8–3
14	Sept 18	vs. Edmonton Eskimos	36–33 (OT)	Win	29,704	9–3
15	Sept 24	at Calgary Stampeders	22–21	Loss	28,524	9–4
16	Oct 2	vs. Winnipeg Blue Bombers	42–31	Win	29,170	10–4
17	Oct 11	at Toronto Argonauts	22–16	Loss	25,212	10–5
18	Oct 17	at Montreal Alouettes	32–29	Win	20,202	11–5
19	Oct 22	vs. Calgary Stampeders	19–17	Win	27,295	12–5
20	Oct 30	vs. Saskatchewan Roughriders	40–38	Win	32,402	13–5

== Player stats ==
=== Passing ===
Player	Att.	Comp	%	Yards	TD	INT	Rating
Casey Printers	494	325	65.8	5088	35	10	115.0
Dave Dickenson	98	62	63.3	967	8	2	114.6
Spergon Wynn	34	21	61.8	268	2	0	106.0
Geroy Simon	1	0	0.0	0	0	0	2.1

=== Rushing ===
Player	Att.	Yards	Avg.	Longest	TD
Antonio Warren	219	1136	5.2	37	5
Casey Printers	82	469	5.7	40	9
Eddie Linscomb	40	220	5.5	37	2
Dave Dickenson	12	78	6.5	16	0
Lyle Green	11	43	3.9	12	0

=== Receiving ===
Player	No.	Yards	Avg.	Long	TD
Geroy Simon	103	1750	17.0	89	14
Jason Clermont	83	1220	14.7	80	7
Ryan Thelwell	54	909	16.8	46	6
Chris Brazzell	49	906	18.5	73	8
Frank Cutolo	47	786	16.7	102	9

== Awards and records ==
- Casey Printers (QB), – CFL's Most Outstanding Player Award
- Jason Clermont (SB), – CFL's Most Outstanding Canadian Award
- Casey Printers (QB), – Jeff Nicklin Memorial Trophy

=== 2004 CFL All-Stars ===
- Casey Printers, Quarterback
- Geroy Simon, Slotback
- Barrin Simpson, Linebacker

=== Western Division All-Star Selections ===
- Casey Printers, Quarterback
- Jason Clermont, Slotback
- Geroy Simon, Slotback
- Ryan Thelwell, Wide Receiver
- Angus Reid, Centre
- Brent Johnson, Defensive End
- Barrin Simpson, Linebacker
- Sam Young, Safety

== Playoffs ==
=== West Final ===
Team	Q1	Q2	Q3	Q4	OT	Total
Saskatchewan Roughriders	7	7	0	10	1	25
BC Lions	7	0	7	10	3	27

=== Grey Cup ===
Team	Q1	Q2	Q3	Q4	Total
Toronto Argonauts	0	17	7	3	27
BC Lions	7	3	3	6	19

Toronto Argonauts (27) – TDs, Damon Allen (2), Robert Baker; FGs Noel Prefontaine (2); cons., Prefontaine (3).

BC Lions (19) – TDs, Jason Clermont, Dave Dickenson; FGs Duncan O'Mahony (2); cons. O'Mahony (1).

First quarter
BC—TD Clermont 12-yard pass from Dickenson (O'Mahony convert) 4:07

Second quarter
TOR—FG Prefontaine 27-yard field goal 7:40
TOR—TD Allen 1-yard run (Prefontaine convert) 12:22
BC—FG O'Mahony 42-yard field goal 13:13
TOR—TD Baker 23-yard pass from Allen (Prefontaine convert) 14:37

Third quarter
TOR—TD Allen 1-yard run (Prefontaine convert) 4:45
BC—FG O'Mahony 36-yard field goal 9:16

Fourth quarter
BC—TD Dickenson 7-yard run (convert failed) 6:06
TOR—FG Prefontaine 16-yard field goal 12:19

== Roster ==
2004 BC Lions final roster
Quarterbacks: 12 Dave Dickenson; 1 Casey Printers; 13 Spergon Wynn; Running backs: 36 Jason Gavadza; 28 Lyle Green; 25 Darren Joseph; 34 Antonio Warren; Receivers: 85 Chris Brazzell; 82 Jason Clermont; 86 Frank Cutolo; 19 Paris Jackson; 84 Aaron Lockett; 81 Geroy Simon; 3 Ryan Thelwell	Offensive linemen: 59 Kelly Bates G; 67 Carl Gourgues G; 58 David Heasman T; 60 Marques McFadden T; 69 Freddie Moore T; 64 Angus Reid C; 62 Bobby Singh G; Defensive linemen: 97 Brent Johnson DE; 95 Cameron Legault DT; 91 Nautyn McKay-Loescher DE; 93 Marc Pilon DT; 90 Mawuko Tugbenyoh DE; 96 Tyrone Williams DT	Linebackers: 4 JoJuan Armour; 35 Otis Floyd; 26 Carl Kidd; 33 Kelly Lochbaum; 51 Barrin Simpson; Defensive backs: 24 Da'Shann Austin; 21 Fabian Burke; 10 Jason Crumb; 17 Bo Lewis; 31 Dante Marsh; 23 Mark Washington; 2 Sam Young	Special teams: 7 Duncan O'Mahony K/P; Injured list: 92 Dante Booker DT; 6 Javier Glatt LB; 54 Chris Hoople LB; 68 Cory Mantyka T; 20 Mark Nohra RB; Italics indicate International player
