= Paris Jackson (Canadian football) =

Canadian football player (born 1980)

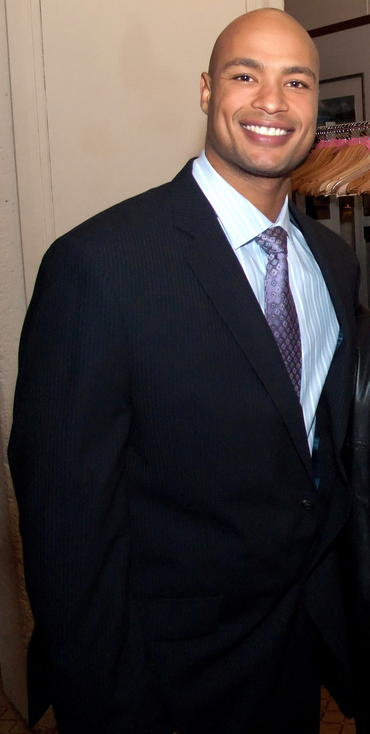

No. 19
- Positions: Slotback, wide receiver

Personal information
- Born: July 24, 1980 (age 46); Vancouver, British Columbia, Canada
- Listed height: 6 ft 3 in (1.91 m)
- Listed weight: 215 lb (98 kg)

Career information
- High school: Carson Graham (North Vancouver)
- College: Utah
- CFL draft: 2003: 1st round, 6th overall pick

Career history
- 2003–2013: BC Lions
- 2014: Ottawa Redblacks
- 2014: Edmonton Eskimos

Awards and highlights
- 2× Grey Cup champion (2006, 2011); CFL West All-Star (2008)
- Stats at CFL.ca (archive)

Paris Jackson (born July 24, 1980) is a Canadian former professional football slotback who played in the Canadian Football League (CFL). He was selected sixth overall by the BC Lions in the 2003 CFL draft, and signed with the team on August 30, 2003. He played college football for the Utah Utes from 2001 to 2002.

== Early life ==
Jackson was team captain at Carson Graham Secondary School in North Vancouver. In his senior year, he set the school's single-game record for most rushing yards and touchdowns, and accumulated 2,138 rushing yards and 24 touchdowns.

== College career ==
Jackson attended Butte College in California in 2000, where he was an All-Conference player, recording 35 receptions for 899 yards and 8 touchdowns. He then transferred to the University of Utah, where he majored in sociology. In 2002, he caught 43 passes in 11 games, finishing second on the team in receiving with 553 yards, and third in scoring with 6 touchdowns. He received an honourable mention for Conference All-Star.

== Professional career ==
=== BC Lions ===
Jackson was selected in the first round, 6th overall in the 2003 CFL draft by his hometown team, the BC Lions. He signed with the Lions midway through the 2003 season. As a backup wide receiver in 2003 and 2004, he caught 16 passes for 223 yards, and played in the 2004 Grey Cup against the Toronto Argonauts.

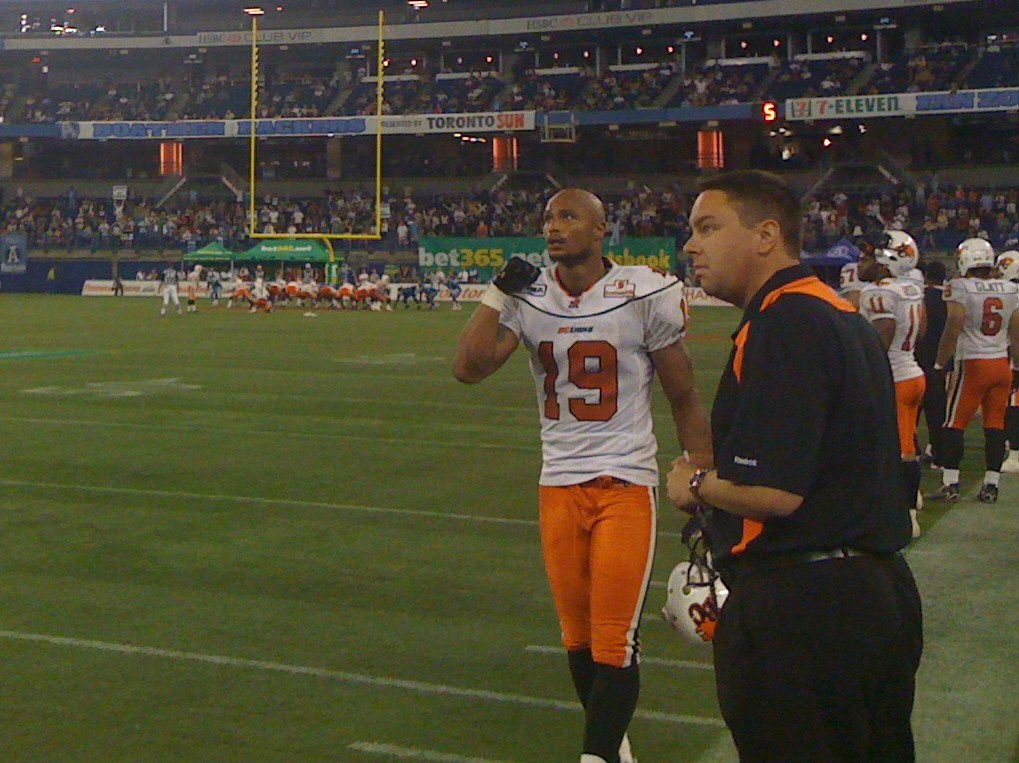
Jackson watches the videoboard as Sean Whyte kicks a field goal against the Argonauts.

Jackson saw more playing time in 2005, finishing with 48 catches for 617 yards and 4 touchdowns, including a team-high 6 receptions in the West Division Final. In 2006, he was second on the team with 51 catches for 634 yards and 4 touchdowns. Jackson caught 2 touchdown passes in the West Division Final, and had 5 receptions for 65 yards in the Lions' 2006 Grey Cup victory over the Montreal Alouettes.

In 2007, he posted career bests in every receiving category. He has been noted as an exciting receiver for the Lions with a penchant for making acrobatic catches.

Jackson recorded his best season of his career in 2008 when he caught 76 passes for 1,180 yards and eight touchdowns; all career highs. In recognition of his strong season, he was named a CFL West All-Star and was the BC Lions' nominee for the Most Outstanding Canadian Award

For the 2009 BC Lions season, Jackson took over the slotback role left by the departure of Jason Clermont and recorded his second straight 1000-yard season.

In 2010, Jackson saw his receiving numbers decrease as his production was hampered by injuries and inconsistent quarterback play. He had a 111 consecutive games-played streak end this season as he missed his first CFL game of his career during BC's game against Edmonton on October 9, 2009. He only managed to score one touchdown this season, which was his least since 2004 when he didn't score any.

For the next three seasons, Jackson was relegated to a backup role, catching no more than 10 passes for 2011, 2012 and 2013 seasons. He did, however, have two receptions in the Lions' 99th Grey Cup victory, which was his second Grey Cup championship. On February 22, Jackson was released by the Lions, after his 11th season with the club.

=== Ottawa Redblacks ===
On March 7, 2014, Jackson signed with the Ottawa Redblacks of the Canadian Football League.

=== Edmonton Eskimos ===
Jackson was signed by the Edmonton Eskimos on September 29, 2014.

== Statistics ==
| Receiving | | Regular season | | | | | | Playoffs |
| Year | Team | Games | No. | Yards | Avg | Long | TD | Games | No. | Yards | Avg | Long | TD |
|---|---|---|---|---|---|---|---|---|---|---|---|---|---|
| 2003 | BC | 8 | 6 | 85 | 14.2 | 35 | 0 | 1 | 4 | 38 | 9.5 | 15 | 0 |
| 2004 | BC | 18 | 10 | 138 | 13.8 | 28 | 0 | 2 | 0 | 0 | 0.0 | 0 | 0 |
| 2005 | BC | 18 | 48 | 617 | 12.9 | 40 | 4 | 1 | 6 | 86 | 14.3 | 47 | 0 |
| 2006 | BC | 18 | 51 | 634 | 12.4 | 49 | 4 | 2 | 10 | 131 | 13.1 | 35 | 2 |
| 2007 | BC | 18 | 65 | 962 | 14.8 | 64 | 5 | 1 | 3 | 34 | 11.3 | 16 | 0 |
| 2008 | BC | 18 | 76 | 1,180 | 15.5 | 56 | 8 | 2 | 7 | 44 | 6.3 | 12 | 0 |
| 2009 | BC | 17 | 76 | 1,042 | 13.7 | 57 | 8 | 2 | 7 | 67 | 9.6 | 18 | 1 |
| 2010 | BC | 18 | 61 | 758 | 12.4 | 53 | 1 | 1 | 5 | 69 | 13.8 | 34 | 0 |
| 2011 | BC | 16 | 7 | 117 | 16.7 | 51 | 1 | 2 | 2 | 43 | 21.5 | 30 | 0 |
| 2012 | BC | 18 | 10 | 127 | 12.7 | 30 | 0 | 0 | 0 | 0 | 0.0 | 0 | 0 |
| 2013 | BC | 18 | 10 | 97 | 9.7 | 20 | 0 | 1 | 3 | 29 | 9.6 | 22 | 0 |
| 2014 | OTT | 7 | 6 | 34 | 5.7 | 15 | 0 |
| 2014 | EDM | 2 | 7 | 68 | 9.7 | 25 | 0 | 2 | 7 | 78 | 11.1 | 31 | 1 |
| CFL totals | | 194 | 433 | 5,859 | 13.5 | 64 | 31 | 17 | 54 | 619 | 11.5 | 47 | 4 |

== Personal ==
Jackson wears a cross necklace that contains his deceased mother's ashes. Before each game, he dresses in his equipment and kisses the cross before removing it and placing it in his locker. He has one daughter, born in September 2008, and one son born in 2011.
