= Lorne Plante =

Canadian football player (born 1984)

Profile
- Position: Centre

Personal information
- Born: May 13, 1984 (age 42); Winnipeg, Manitoba, Canada
- Listed height: 6 ft 7 in (2.01 m)
- Listed weight: 250 lb (113 kg)

Career information
- College: Manitoba

Career history
- BC Lions (2006–2008); Winnipeg Blue Bombers (2009)

Awards and highlights
- Grey Cup champion (2006)
- Stats at CFL.ca (archive)

Lorne Plante (born May 13, 1984) is a Canadian former professional football centre who played in the Canadian Football League. He was signed as an undrafted free agent by the BC Lions in 2006. He played CIS football for the Manitoba Bisons.
