= Nautyn McKay-Loescher =

Canadian gridiron football player (born 1981)

No. 91
- Position: Defensive end

Personal information
- Born: November 9, 1980 (age 45); Toronto, Ontario, Canada
- Listed height: 6 ft 2 in (1.88 m)
- Listed weight: 260 lb (118 kg)

Career information
- High school: Central Technical School
- College: University of Alabama
- CFL draft: 2004: 2nd round, 12th overall pick

Career history
- 2004: Indianapolis Colts*
- 2004–2006: BC Lions
- 2007–2008: Hamilton Tiger-Cats
- 2009: BC Lions
- * Offseason or practice squad member only

Awards and highlights
- Grey Cup champion (2006)
- Stats at CFL.ca

Nautyn McKay-Loescher (born November 9, 1980) is a Canadian former professional football defensive end. He was signed by the Indianapolis Colts as an undrafted free agent in 2004 and drafted in the 2004 CFL draft by the BC Lions. He played college football at Alabama.

McKay-Loescher also played for the Hamilton Tiger-Cats.

== Early life ==
McKay-Loescher was born in Toronto and attended Central Technical School there. He went to the University of Alabama and played college football for the Alabama Crimson Tide football team from 2000 to 2003. He played 47 games and started 16 at defensive end, made 77 total tackles (including 12.5 quarterback sacks), 1 forced fumble, 1 fumble return, and 4 pass knock-downs.

== Professional career ==
McKay-Loescher was selected 12th overall by the BC Lions in the 2004 CFL draft but initially signed on May 3 as an undrafted NFL free agent with the Indianapolis Colts. He attended the Colts training camp but was released with an injury settlement on August 28 and signed with BC on September 29. After missing the final five regular season games, he made his CFL debut in the 2004 CFL season West Division final and also played in the Lions loss to the Toronto Argonauts in the 92nd Grey Cup.

In the 2005 CFL season, McKay-Loescher played his first full season with three sacks and a pair of tackles. In 2006, he recorded 9 tackles, 5 sacks and a 69-yard fumble recovery, which he returned for his first CFL touchdown. His 2006 CFL season ended with the 94th Grey Cup championship victory over the Montreal Alouettes.

McKay-Loescher became a free agent and signed with the Hamilton Tiger-Cats on February 16, 2007. He started 16 games for the Ti-Cats in the 2007 CFL season and led the team with 11 quarterback sacks. He also recorded 17 defensive tackles, 1 special teams tackle, forced 3 fumbles, and recovered 1 fumble. The 2008 CFL season saw McKay-Loescher play in 17 of 18 regular season games making 13 tackles, 2 sacks, and forcing 1 fumble.

He was released by the Tiger-Cats on February 25, 2009.

McKay-Loescher re-signed with the BC Lions on March 10, 2009.

On February 25, 2010, the BC Lions released McKay-Loescher.
