= Jason Jimenez =

American gridiron football player (born 1980)

- Jimenez with the Green Bay Packers in 2004

No. 60
- Position: Offensive tackle

Personal information
- Born: May 1, 1980 (age 46); Queens, New York, U.S.
- Listed height: 6 ft 7 in (2.01 m)
- Listed weight: 320 lb (145 kg)

Career information
- High school: Cypress Creek High School; Orlando, Florida
- College: Southern Mississippi

Career history
- 2003: Cleveland Browns*
- 2003–2004: Green Bay Packers*
- 2004: Frankfurt Galaxy
- 2004: Oakland Raiders*
- 2005: Tampa Bay Buccaneers*
- 2005: Cologne Centurions
- 2005: Detroit Lions*
- 2006–2009: BC Lions
- 2010–2011: Hamilton Tiger-Cats
- * Offseason or practice squad member only

Awards and highlights
- Grey Cup champion (2006); CFL All-Star (2008); CFL West All-Star (2008)

Jason Jimenez (born May 1, 1980) is a former professional gridiron football offensive tackle. He is a member of the 2006 Grey Cup champions, the BC Lions of the CFL.

== Professional career ==
In 2003, Jimenez played on the practice squad for the Cleveland Browns, Oakland Raiders and Green Bay Packers of the NFL. He was signed by the Packers in January 2004 and released in September 2004. The Raiders assigned him to the Cologne Centurions of NFL Europe in 2005. The BC Lions signed him on January 31, 2006. In 2008, he was named a CFL All-Star.

On January 29, 2010, Jimenez was released by the Lions after playing 71 games over a four-year period.

Jimenez signed as a free agent with the Hamilton Tiger-Cats on February 23, 2010. Terms of the deal were not disclosed.

== Personal life ==
He went to The University of Southern Mississippi where he earned joint degrees in Political science and Criminal justice while playing for the Southern Mississippi Golden Eagles. He graduated from Cypress Creek HS in Orlando Fl. As of 2023, Jimenez has a wife and 2 kids, he was a principal at Legacy Middle School in Orlando, Florida. He is now the principal at Innovation High school in Orlando, Florida.
