= Stanley Franks =

American gridiron football player (born 1986)

No. 6
- Position: Defensive back

Personal information
- Born: July 7, 1986 (age 40); Long Beach, California, U.S.
- Listed height: 5 ft 9 in (1.75 m)
- Listed weight: 180 lb (82 kg)

Career information
- College: Idaho
- NFL draft: 2008: undrafted

Career history
- 2008: San Diego Chargers*
- 2009: Spokane Shock
- 2009–2011: BC Lions
- * Offseason or practice squad member only

Awards and highlights
- Grey Cup champion (2011)
- Stats at CFL.ca (archive)

Stanley Franks (born July 7, 1986) is an American former professional football defensive back who played in the Canadian Football League (CFL). During his playing career, Franks played for the BC Lions and the AF2 champion Spokane Shock. He played college football at the University of Idaho, where he transitioned from wide receiver to defensive back and led the NCAA in interceptions in 2006.

== College career ==
Franks began his college football career at Long Beach City College, where he played as a wide receiver. In 2005, he earned Junior College All-American honors after recording 62 receptions for 778 yards and eight touchdowns.

Franks transferred to the University of Idaho in 2006, where he transitioned to defensive back. That year, he led the NCAA in interceptions per game with an average of 0.75, totaling nine interceptions. He set the Idaho single-season record for interceptions and interception return yards (220) and earned First-Team All-WAC honors as well as Sports Illustrated Honorable Mention All-America recognition. Among his standout moments was a 98-yard interception return touchdown against Utah State, the fourth-longest in program history. Franks continued to contribute to the Vandals' defense during the 2007 season, solidifying his place in the school’s record books.

== Professional career ==
After his collegiate career, Franks signed as a free agent with the San Diego Chargers. Franks signed as a free agent to the Lions practice roster on October 27, 2009. Prior to the 2010 season, Franks won the job as starting defensive halfback. Prior to his time with the Lions, he played for the AF2 champion Spokane Shock.

== Coaching career ==
Franks later became the defensive backs coach for the University of New Mexico.
