= Adam Leonard (gridiron football) =

American gridiron football player (born 1986)

No. 44
- Position: Linebacker

Personal information
- Born: November 4, 1986 (age 40); Seattle, Washington, U.S.
- Listed height: 6 ft 0 in (1.83 m)
- Listed weight: 235 lb (107 kg)

Career information
- College: Hawaii
- NFL draft: 2009: undrafted

Career history
- 2009: Seattle Seahawks*
- 2010–2011: BC Lions
- * Offseason or practice squad member only

Awards and highlights
- 99th Grey Cup champion
- Stats at CFL.ca (archive)

Adam Leonard (born November 4, 1986) is a former professional gridiron football linebacker. He most recently played for the BC Lions of the Canadian Football League (CFL). Leonard signed as a free agent with the Lions on July 20, 2010. He played college football for the Hawaii Warriors. He is a high school teacher at John Glenn high school in Norwalk California.
