= Justin Shaw =

Canadian football player (born 1982)

No. 91
- Position: Linebacker

Personal information
- Born: September 23, 1982 (age 44); Victoria, British Columbia, Canada
- Listed height: 6 ft 4 in (1.93 m)
- Listed weight: 235 lb (107 kg)

Career information
- University: University of Manitoba
- CFL draft: 2008: 3rd round, 18th overall pick

Career history
- 2008–2009: BC Lions*
- 2009: Winnipeg Blue Bombers
- * Offseason or practice squad member only
- Stats at CFL.ca

Justin Shaw (born September 23, 1982) is a Canadian former professional football linebacker for the Winnipeg Blue Bombers. He was drafted by the BC Lions in the third round of the 2008 CFL draft. In college, he played CIS Football for the Manitoba Bisons.
