= Jason Clermont =

Professional Canadian football slotback

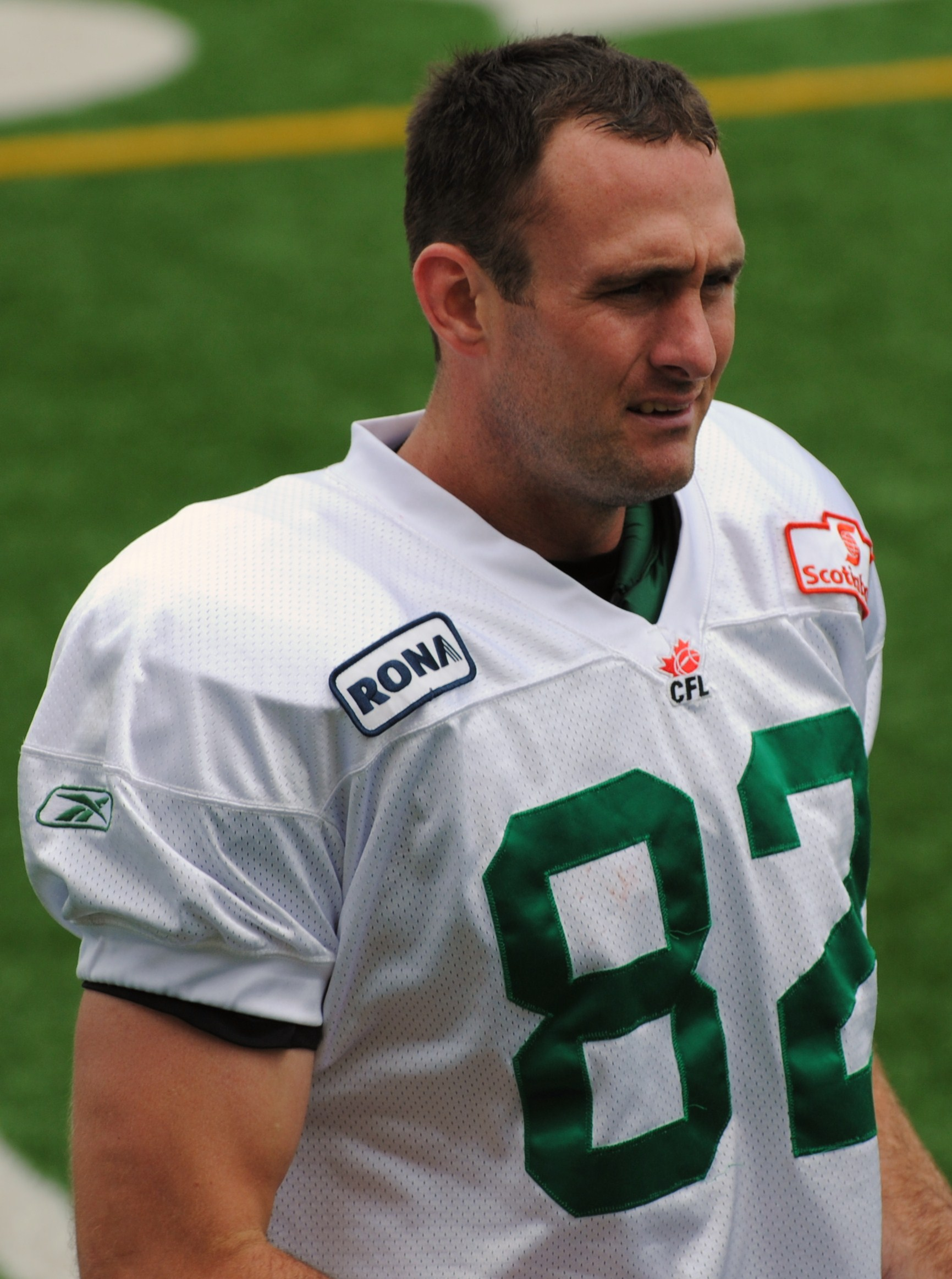
- Clermont with the Saskatchewan Roughriders in 2010

No. 82
- Position: Slotback

Personal information
- Born: May 24, 1978 (age 48); Regina, Saskatchewan, Canada
- Listed height: 6 ft 2 in (1.88 m)
- Listed weight: 227 lb (103 kg)

Career information
- High school: Robert Usher Collegiate
- University: Regina
- CFL draft: 2002: 1st round, 4th overall pick

Career history
- 2002–2008: BC Lions
- 2009–2011: Saskatchewan Roughriders

Awards and highlights
- Grey Cup champion (2006); Dick Suderman Trophy (2004); 2× CFL's Most Outstanding Canadian Award (2004, 2007); CFL's Most Outstanding Rookie Award (2002); Jackie Parker Trophy (2002); CFL All-Star (2007); 2× CFL West All-Star (2004, 2007)
- Stats at CFL.ca (archive)

Jason Clermont (born May 24, 1978) is a Canadian former professional football slotback who played ten seasons in the Canadian Football League (CFL) with the BC Lions and Saskatchewan Roughriders. Clermont started his professional career with the Lions after being selected in the 2002 CFL draft. He played amateur football in his hometown of Regina, starting with the Regina Rams junior football club, and continuing with the team after they became affiliated with the University of Regina. While playing university football, Clermont was named an All-Star and All-Canadian, as well as the Most Valuable Player in the Canada West Conference and represented Western Canada as one of only two Canadian players in the East West Shrine Bowl in San Francisco. As a professional, Clermont's honours have included being named the CFL's Most Outstanding Rookie in 2002, Most Outstanding Canadian in 2004 and 2007, as well as the Most Valuable Canadian at the 2004 Grey Cup. Clermont captured a Grey Cup championship with the Lions in 2006. He joined his hometown Roughriders at the start of the 2009 season after being released by the Lions and is now a member of the Regina Sports Hall of Fame as well as the University of Regina Hall of Fame and BC Lions Wall of Fame.

== Amateur football ==
=== High school ===
Clermont started playing football when he was eight years old, after seeing a minor football team practicing behind his home. He played high school football at Robert Usher Collegiate in his hometown of Regina, Saskatchewan. In 1995, Clermont quarterbacked Usher to a city championship.

=== Junior ===
After finishing his high school career, Clermont played for the Regina Rams of the Canadian Junior Football League (CJFL). Clermont was named the Prairie Football Conference's Outstanding Rookie Receiver in 1996 and was named to the conference's All-Star team in 1997 and 1998. He was named a CJFL All-Canadian in 1998. The Rams won the Canadian Bowl as the nation's junior football champions in 1997 and 1998. In 1997, Clermont scored the winning touchdown in double overtime. As of 2010, Clermont still holds the CJFL record for most points scored in a game with 18 on October 25, 1997. In that game, he also set the record for most touchdowns in a game, with three, and most receiving touchdowns in a game with two.

=== University ===
After the 1998 season, the Rams left the CJFL in favour of affiliation with the University of Regina to play Canadian Interuniversity Sport (CIS) football in the Canada West conference. In 2000, Clermont and the Rams were the runners up in the Vanier Cup championship. During his senior year with the Rams, Clermont was named a Canada West All-Star, and a CIS All-Canadian in addition to being named the Most Outstanding Player in the Canada West conference and the nominee for Hec Creighton Award. He was also selected to participate in the annual East-West Shrine Game at the end of the season. In 2007, Clermont was inducted in the Regina Rams Hall of Fame.

== Professional career ==
=== BC Lions ===
After his university career, Clermont was drafted in the first round (fourth overall) of the 2002 CFL draft by the BC Lions. During the Lions' 2002 season Clermont played slotback and played a key role in the team's offense with 46 receptions for 735 yards and six touchdowns. These numbers were good enough for Clermont to capture the CFL's Most Outstanding Rookie Award. Clermont had similar production in 2003, finishing the season with 615 yards and seven touchdowns.

Clermont had his breakthrough season in 2004, catching 83 passes for 1220 yards and seven touchdowns. He was named the CFL's Top Canadian in addition to securing a spot on the Western Division All-Star Team. Clermont and the Lions made it to the 2004 Grey Cup, but were defeated by the Toronto Argonauts. Despite the loss, Clermont captured the Dick Suderman Trophy as the Outstanding Canadian in the championship game.

With the Lions in 2005, Clermont recorded his second 1000-yard season, and caught four touchdown passes. The 2006 season was a disappointing one for Clermont, as he missed significant time after suffering torn knee ligaments in the first game of the season. He finished the season with 44 receptions and three touchdowns, while starting 11 games. Clermont was back in the lineup in time for the playoffs, and saw limited action as the Lions captured the 2006 Grey Cup with a 25–14 victory over the Montreal Alouettes.

In 2007, Clermont caught 86 passes for 1158 yards and 7 touchdowns. He won his second CFL Most Outstanding Canadian award and he was named a CFL All-Star.

Clermont had an injury plagued season in 2008, leading head coach Wally Buono to deem him expendable. As such, on December 3, 2008, the Lions released Clermont and he became a free agent. In August 2016 the BC Lions inducted Clermont into their Wall of Fame.

=== Saskatchewan Roughriders ===
Clermont signed a contract with the Saskatchewan Roughriders on December 12, 2008, finally being afforded the opportunity to join his hometown team. Although fans expected much from Clermont for the 2009 season, his role on offence was limited as he only caught 23 passes for 317 yards and was a healthy scratch for two games. His first touchdown for the Roughriders was scored on November 14, 2010, at the end of the first semifinal game of the season, taking Saskatchewan to a 41-38 victory against the BC Lions in double overtime. Clermont was named the CFL's Outstanding Canadian for the first week of the playoffs after his performance in the Western semi-final.

On April 24, 2012, Clermont retired from the Canadian Football League after a ten-year career that included four Grey Cup appearances and one Grey Cup championship.

== CFL career statistics ==
| Receiving | | Regular season | | | | | | Playoffs |
| Year | Team | Games | No. | Yards | Avg | Long | TD | Games | No. | Yards | Avg | Long | TD |
|---|---|---|---|---|---|---|---|---|---|---|---|---|---|
| 2002 | BC | 18 | 46 | 735 | 16.0 | 41 | 6 | 1 | 2 | 36 | 18.0 | 19 | 0 |
| 2003 | BC | 15 | 41 | 615 | 15.0 | 39 | 7 | 1 | 2 | 13 | 6.5 | 9 | 0 |
| 2004 | BC | 18 | 83 | 1,220 | 14.7 | 80 | 7 | 2 | 8 | 131 | 16.4 | 36 | 1 |
| 2005 | BC | 18 | 78 | 1,042 | 13.4 | 69 | 4 | 1 | 2 | 37 | 18.5 | 20 | 0 |
| 2006 | BC | 11 | 44 | 507 | 11.5 | 26 | 3 | 2 | 9 | 98 | 10.9 | 22 | 0 |
| 2007 | BC | 18 | 86 | 1,158 | 13.5 | 93 | 7 | 1 | 2 | 28 | 14.0 | 22 | 0 |
| 2008 | BC | 15 | 50 | 640 | 12.8 | 36 | 3 | 2 | 6 | 64 | 10.7 | 18 | 0 |
| 2009 | SSK | 16 | 23 | 317 | 13.8 | 65 | 0 | 2 | 3 | 46 | 15.3 | 30 | 0 |
| 2010 | SSK | 18 | 27 | 300 | 11.1 | 35 | 0 | 3 | 8 | 115 | 14.4 | 32 | 1 |
| 2011 | SSK | 18 | 23 | 232 | 10.1 | 25 | 1 |
| CFL totals | | 165 | 501 | 6,756 | 13.5 | 93 | 38 | 15 | 42 | 570 | 13.6 | 36 | 2 |
