= Dante Marsh =

American gridiron football player (born 1979)

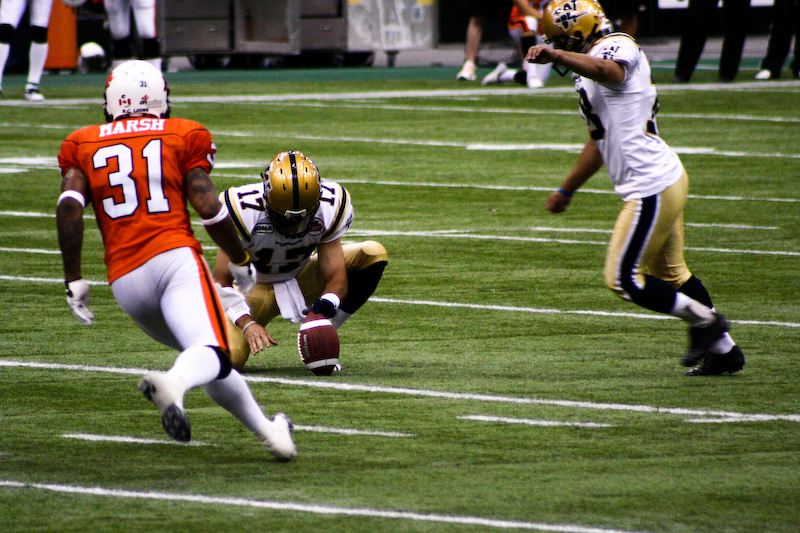
- Marsh (31) in 2009

No. 31
- Position: Cornerback

Personal information
- Born: February 26, 1979 (age 47); Oakland, California, U.S.
- Listed height: 5 ft 10 in (1.78 m)
- Listed weight: 190 lb (86 kg)

Career information
- High school: McClymonds (Oakland, California)
- College: Fresno State

Career history
- 2004–2014: BC Lions

Awards and highlights
- 2× Grey Cup champion (2006, 2011); 4× CFLPA All Star (2008, 2011, 2012, 2013); CFL All-Star (2008); 4× CFL West All-Star (2006, 2008, 2011, 2013)
- Stats at CFL.ca (archive)

Dante Marsh (born February 26, 1979) is an American former professional football cornerback who spent 11 seasons with the BC Lions of the Canadian Football League (CFL). Marsh attended college at Fresno State. He is currently the Cornerbacks Coach at Contra Costa College (San Pablo).

== Professional career ==
Marsh had a brief stint with the NFL's Tennessee Titans in 2001, but missed the whole season due to injury. The BC Lions signed him as a free agent in 2004, in which Marsh recorded his career-high 61 tackles. In 2005, he started all 18 games, and had 47 defensive tackles and 7 special teams tackles. In 2006, Marsh had a career-high 4 interceptions as well as 52 tackles. He helped BC win the 2006 Grey Cup. Marsh is regarded as one of the best cornerbacks in the CFL and he was named a CFL All-Star in 2008. Entering his 10th season as a BC Lion, at age 34, he was awarded a contract extension. Marsh has 33 career interceptions and 3 defensive touchdowns. He became a free agent in late 2014.
