= Jerome Dennis (Canadian football) =

American football player (born 1981)

No. 20
- Position: Defensive back

Personal information
- Born: December 6, 1981 (age 44); Carson, California, U.S.
- Listed height: 5 ft 7 in (1.70 m)
- Listed weight: 270 lb (122 kg)

Career information
- College: Utah State
- NFL draft: 2005: undrafted

Career history
- Indianapolis Colts (2005)*; Spokane Shock (2006); BC Lions (2007–2009); Hamilton Tiger-Cats (2010–2011); BC Lions (2011)
- * Offseason or practice squad member only

Awards and highlights
- Grey Cup champion (2011)
- Stats at CFL.ca (archive)

Jerome Dennis (December 6, 1981) is an American former professional football player who was a defensive back in the Canadian Football League (CFL). He played college football for the Utah State Aggies and was signed as an undrafted free agent by the Indianapolis Colts of the National Football League (NFL) in 2005.

On March 15, 2010, Dennis was acquired by the Hamilton Tiger-Cats from the BC Lions in exchange for linebacker Dennis Haley. He was released by the Tiger-Cats on July 19, 2011. He was soon after re-signed by the Lions on July 20, 2011.
