= Zac Champion =

American gridiron football player (born 1984)

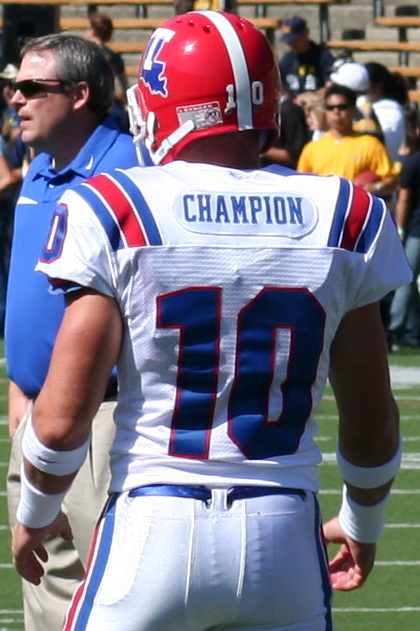
- Champion in 2007

No. 12
- Position: Quarterback

Personal information
- Born: June 29, 1984 (age 42); Birmingham, Alabama
- Listed height: 6 ft 2 in (1.88 m)
- Listed weight: 200 lb (91 kg)

Career information
- College: Louisiana Tech

Career history
- 2008—2010: BC Lions
- 2010: Calgary Stampeders
- 2010: BC Lions
- 2010–2013: Winnipeg Blue Bombers
- Stats at CFL.ca (archive)

Zac Champion (born June 29, 1984) is an American former football quarterback.

Champion was released by the BC Lions on May 10, 2010. On June 7, 2010, Champion was signed by the Calgary Stampeders and was competing for third-string quarterback against Daryll Clark. After playing two disappointing pre-season starts, he lost the spot to Clark. One week later, Champion was cut down to the practice roster. On week four of the CFL season, he was placed on waivers, two weeks later. on October 20, he was signed to the practice roster for the Winnipeg Blue Bombers after Steven Jyles and Alex Brink were both injured.

Champion started as a quarterback for the Louisiana Tech University football team until his graduation following the 2007 season. His senior year, Champion's Bulldogs went 5–7. Champion passed for 2221 yards and 13 touchdowns and throwing only two interceptions.
