= Rufus Skillern =

American gridiron football player (born 1982)

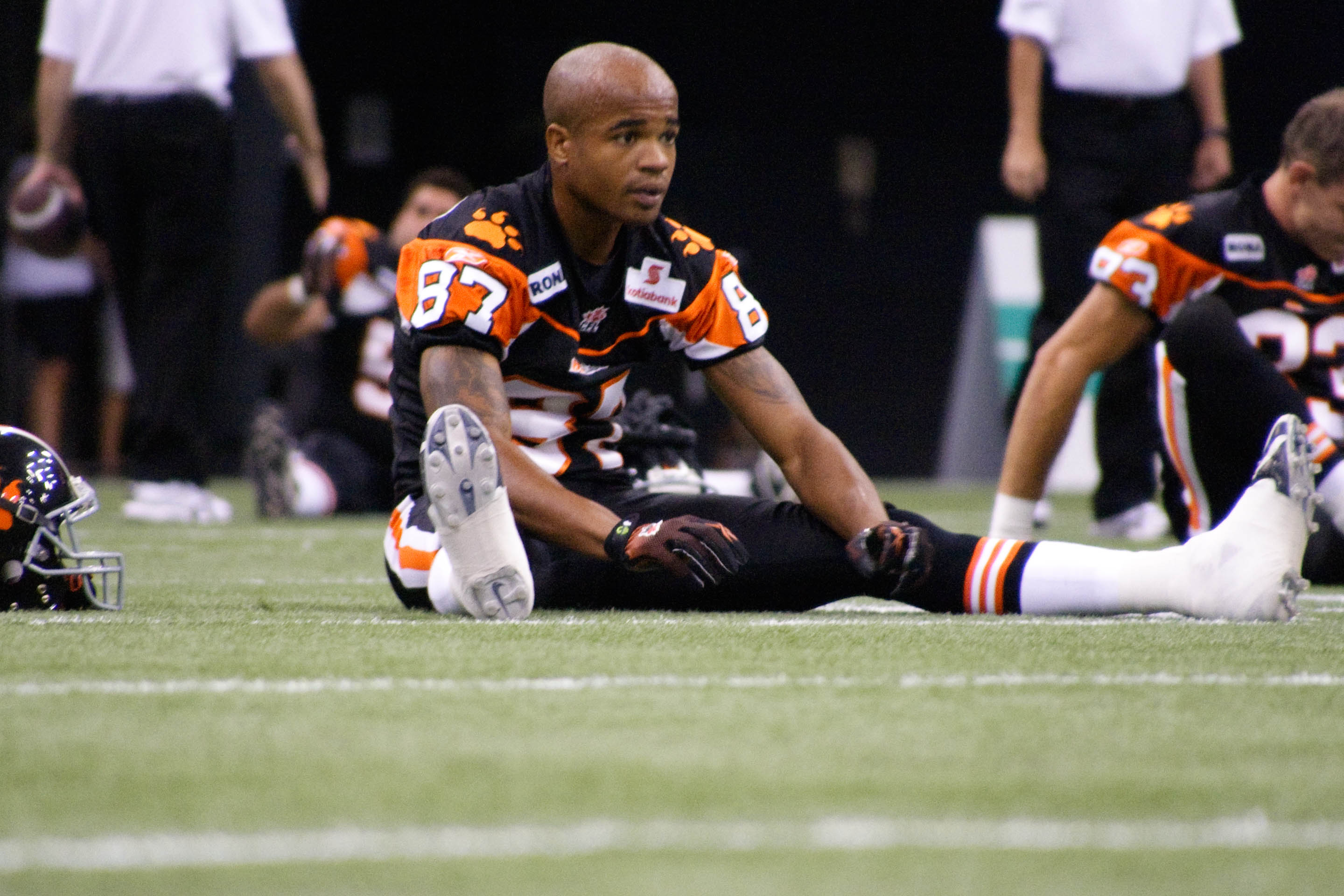
- Skillern with the BC Lions in 2009

Profile
- Position: Wide receiver

Personal information
- Born: May 12, 1982 (age 44); Oakland, California, U.S.
- Listed height: 6 ft 0 in (1.83 m)
- Listed weight: 184 lb (83 kg)

Career information
- College: San Jose State University
- NFL draft: 2006: undrafted

Career history
- 2006: Baltimore Ravens*
- 2008–2009: BC Lions
- * Offseason or practice squad member only
- Stats at CFL.ca

Rufus Skillern (born May 12, 1982) is an American former professional football wide receiver. He was signed by the Baltimore Ravens as an undrafted free agent in 2006. He played college football for the San Jose State Spartans. Skillern also played for the BC Lions.
