= Jon Hameister-Ries =

Canadian gridiron football player (1984–2021)

Profile
- Position: Guard

Personal information
- Born: January 26, 1984; Edmonton, Alberta, Canada
- Died: June 9, 2021 (aged 37)
- Listed height: 6 ft 6 in (1.98 m)
- Listed weight: 285 lb (129 kg)

Career information
- College: Tulsa
- CFL draft: 2006: 2nd round, 15th overall pick

Career history
- 2007: Arizona Cardinals*
- 2007–2013: BC Lions
- * Offseason or practice squad member only

Awards and highlights
- Grey Cup champion (2011)
- Stats at CFL.ca (archive)

Jonathan William Hameister-Ries (January 26, 1984 – June 9, 2021) was a professional Canadian football offensive lineman who played for the BC Lions of the Canadian Football League. He was drafted 15th overall by the Lions in the 2006 CFL draft. He was then signed to the practice roster of the Lions a month later where he spent the remainder of the 2007 CFL season. He played college football for the Tulsa Golden Hurricane. He was released by the Lions on June 16, 2013. He competed in the second season of MasterChef Canada and reached Top 8. Hameister-Ries was a free agent signing of the Arizona Cardinals in May 2007, however, he was released at the end of their training camp on August 30, 2007.

== Death ==
He died on June 9, 2021, at the age of 37.
