= Ian Smart =

Jamaican gridiron football player (born 1980)

No. 2
- Positions: Kick returner, Running back

Personal information
- Born: February 28, 1980 (age 46); Kingston, Jamaica
- Listed height: 5 ft 8 in (1.73 m)
- Listed weight: 200 lb (91 kg)

Career information
- College: C.W. Post College

Career history
- 2003: New York Jets*
- 2004: Scottish Claymores
- 2004: New York Jets*
- 2004–2005: Tampa Bay Buccaneers
- 2006: Montreal Alouettes
- 2006–2009: BC Lions
- * Offseason or practice squad member only

Awards and highlights
- Grey Cup champion (2006); John Agro Special Teams Award (2007); CFL All-Star (2007); 2× CFL West All-Star (2007, 2008)
- Stats at Pro Football Reference
- Stats at CFL.ca

Ian Smart (born February 28, 1980) is a Jamaican-born former professional gridiron football running back and kick returner who played in the National Football League (NFL) and Canadian Football League (CFL). He attended C.W. Post College and rushed for 2,536 yards in 2001.

In 2003, Smart attended New York Jets training camp but joined NFL Europe's now-defunct Scottish Claymores as a running back. He played 4 games with the NFL's Tampa Bay Buccaneers in 2004. He was on the Buccaneers's practice roster during the 2005 season.

Smart played 4 seasons for BC Lions and replaced Aaron Lockett as their kick returner during the 2006 season. He became their backup running back when Alexis Bwenge became a fullback. Smart scored a 25-yard touchdown as running back for the BC Lions in their 2006 Grey Cup victory.

On February 25, 2010, Smart was released by the BC Lions.
