= Kierrie Johnson =

American gridiron football player and coach (born 1988)

- Johnson with the Toronto Argonauts in 2026

Toronto Argonauts
- Title: Wide receivers coach
- CFL status: American

Personal information
- Born: August 4, 1988 (age 38); Houston, Texas, U.S.
- Listed height: 5 ft 9 in (1.75 m)
- Listed weight: 163 lb (74 kg)

Career information
- Position: Wide receiver (No. 10)
- College: Houston
- NFL draft: 2011: undrafted

Career history

Playing
- 2011–2012: BC Lions
- 2012–2013: Saskatchewan Roughriders
- 2014: Ottawa Redblacks
- 2015: Toronto Argonauts

Coaching
- 2026–present: Toronto Argonauts (Wide receivers coach)

Awards and highlights
- Grey Cup champion (2011)
- Stats at CFL.ca (archive)

Kierrie Johnson (born August 4, 1988) is an American former professional football player and is the wide receivers coach for the Toronto Argonauts of the Canadian Football League (CFL). He played as a wide receiver for the BC Lions, Saskatchewan Roughriders, Ottawa Redblacks, and Argonauts. He played college football for the Houston Cougars.

== Professional career ==
Pre-draft measurables
Height	Weight	40-yard dash	10-yard split	20-yard split	20-yard shuttle	Three-cone drill	Vertical jump	Broad jump	Bench press
5 ft 9 3/8 in (1.76 m)	160 lb (73 kg)	4.40 s	1.50 s	2.63 s	4.26 s	6.95 s	33.5 in (0.85 m)	9 ft 11 in (3.02 m)	7 reps
All values from Pro Day

=== BC Lions ===
Johnson signed as a free agent with the BC Lions on May 26, 2011. Johnson was released by the Lions on October 25, 2012.

=== Saskatchewan Roughriders ===
Johnson signed with the Saskatchewan Roughriders on November 10, 2012. He was on the injured list when the Roughriders won the 101st Grey Cup in 2013.

=== Ottawa Redblacks ===
After two seasons with the Roughriders, Johnson signed with the Ottawa Redblacks on February 18, 2014. Johnson only played in Ottawa's first four games of the season before spending the rest of the season on injured reserve. During those four games, he was the team's leading receiver, amassing 214 yards on 17 receptions. He was released on April 23, 2015.

=== Toronto Argonauts ===
On May 6, 2015, Johnson signed with the Toronto Argonauts. He began the 2015 season on the injured list and was later released on August 11, 2015.

== Coaching career ==
It was announced on January 8, 2026, that Johnson had joined the Toronto Argonauts to serve as the team's wide receivers coach.
