= Wally Buono =

Canadian football player and coach (born 1950)

Wally Buono CM
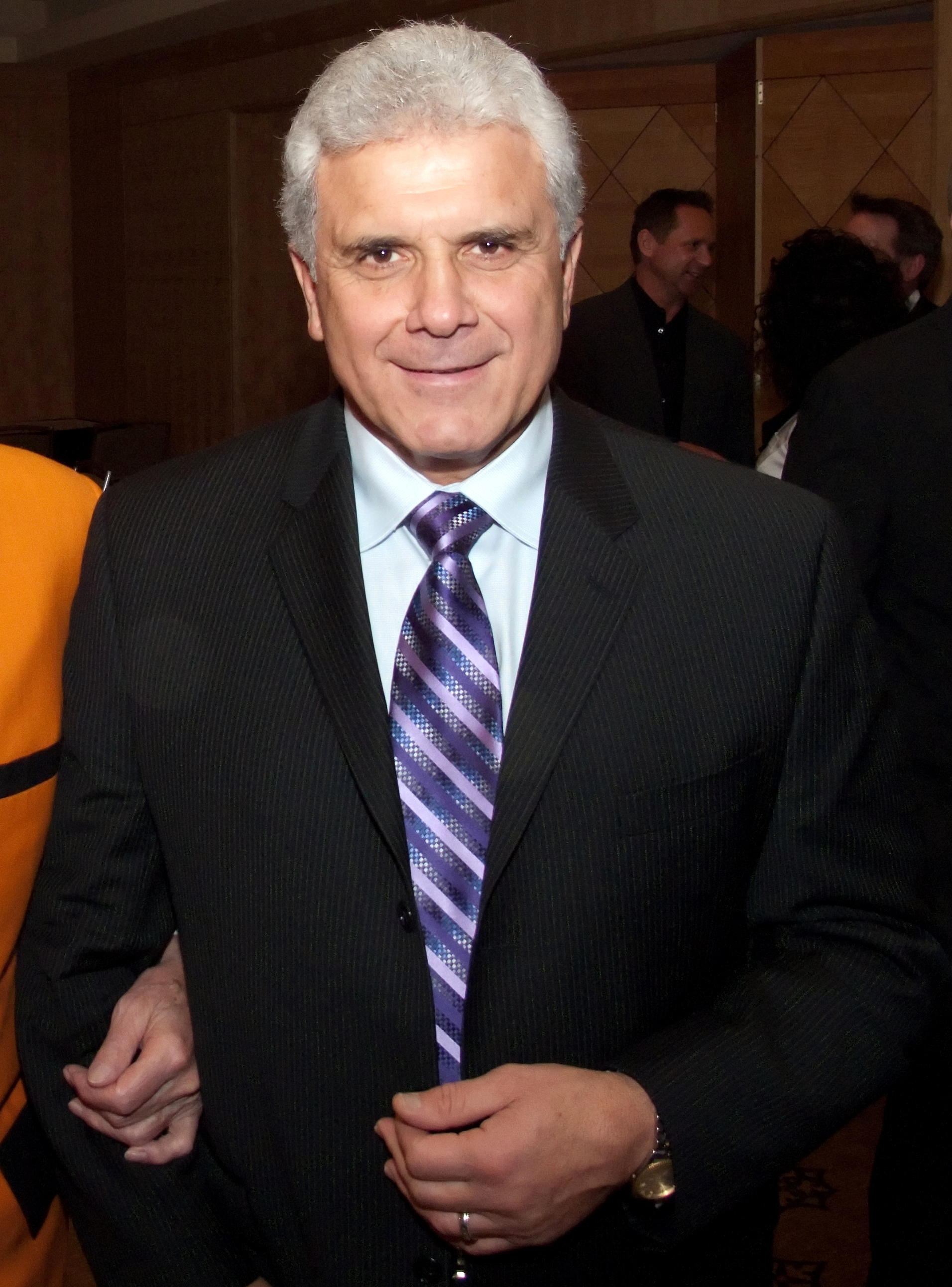
- Buono in 2009

No. 45, 39, 57
- Position: Linebacker

Personal information
- Born: February 7, 1950 (age 76); Potenza, Italy

Career information
- College: Idaho State

Career history

Playing
- 1972–1981: Montreal Alouettes

Coaching
- 1982: Montreal Junior Concordes (Coach)
- 1983–1985: Montreal Concordes (AC)
- 1986: Montreal Alouettes (AC)
- 1987–1989: Calgary Stampeders (AC)
- 1990–2002: Calgary Stampeders (HC)
- 2003–2011, 2016–2018: BC Lions (HC)

Operations
- 1992–2002: Calgary Stampeders (GM)
- 2003–2017: BC Lions (GM)

Awards and highlights
- As player: 2× Grey Cup champion (1974, 1977); As coach: 5× Grey Cup champion (1992, 1998, 2001, 2006, 2011); 4× Annis Stukus Trophy (1992, 1993, 2006, 2011); CFL records: Most regular-season wins by a head coach (282); Most first-place finishes by a head coach (13); Most Grey Cup wins by a head coach (5)
- Canadian Football Hall of Fame (Class of 2014)

Pasquale "Wally" Buono CM (born February 7, 1950) is a Canadian ex-football coach who is the vice president of football operations and alternate governor of the BC Lions of the Canadian Football League (CFL). One of the most successful head coaches in league history, he spent 22 years as head coach of the Calgary Stampeders and the Lions, which is tied for the most seasons coached all-time. On September 19, 2009, Buono became the CFL's all-time winningest coach when his Lions beat the Toronto Argonauts 23–17, giving him 232 regular-season victories, passing Don Matthews. He retired in 2011 with a CFL record 254 regular-season wins as head coach, to focus on duties as general manager for the Lions. In 2016, Buono came out of retirement to coach the Lions again through the 2018 season. In the final home game of the 2018 season, Buono was honored with the Bob Ackles Award as he was retiring from football with the most wins as a coach.

Long before coaching Buono was a linebacker and punter for 10 seasons with the Montreal Alouettes, appearing in 152 consecutive games, not missing one, and in five Grey Cup games between 1972 and 1981, winning two in 1974 and 1977.

Buono's post-season coaching record is 23–17, with five Grey Cup victories in nine appearances. He won the Grey Cup championship in 1992, 1998 and 2001 as head coach of the Stampeders and in 2006 and 2011 as head coach of the Lions. He won the Annis Stukus Trophy as the CFL's Coach of the Year four times, in 1992, 1993, 2006, and 2011, second only to Don Matthews, who had five.

== Early life and playing career ==
Born in Potenza, Italy in 1950, Buono moved to Canada in 1953 with his family. He became interested in football after playing pick up games as a youth in Montréal-Nord, Quebec and being encouraged by CFL all-star Al Phaneuf, a Christian who was coaching a youth football team at one of Montreal’s parks (who invited Buono to join the team.) Soon after, he began playing minor football in Montreal, Quebec.

Buono attended Idaho State University and was a linebacker for the ISU Bengals. He returned to Canada and played 10 seasons with the Montreal Alouettes as a linebacker and punter, appearing in 152 consecutive games, not missing one in his career. He appeared in five Grey Cups between 1974 and 1979, winning two in 1974 and 1977.

=== Career regular season statistics ===
CFL statistics			Interceptions					Punting				
Year	Team	GP	#	Yds	Ave.	Lg	TD	#	Yds	Ave.	Lg	S
1972	Montreal	14	-	-	-	-	-	33	1156	35.0	48	0
1973	Montreal	14	2	19	9.5	10	0	102	3934	38.6	74	3
1974	Montreal	16	1	27	27.0	27	0	27	1025	38.0	50	0
1975	Montreal	16	-	-	-	-	-	-	-	-	-	-
1976	Montreal	16	-	-	-	-	-	-	-	-	-	-
1977	Montreal	16	2	7	3.5	7	0	43	1738	40.4	63	0
1978	Montreal	16	4	61	15.2	33	0	120	5241	43.7	90	8
1979	Montreal	16	2	-5	-2.5	2	0	132	5240	39.7	60	4
1980	Montreal	16	-	-	-	-	-	3	110	36.7	38	0
1981	Montreal	16	-	-	-	-	-	65	2626	40.4	65	1
	Totals		11	109	9.9	33	0	525	21070	40.1	90	16

== Coaching career ==
=== Montreal Junior Concordes ===
In 1982, after his retirement as a player, Buono served as a coach with the Montreal Junior Concordes.

=== Montreal Concordes & Montreal Alouettes ===
From 1983 to 1985, he was an assistant coach with the Montreal Concordes, and then in 1986 with the Montreal Alouettes.

=== Calgary Stampeders ===
From 1987 to 1989, Buono served as an assistant coach with the Calgary Stampeders under head coaches Bob Vespaziani and Lary Kuharich.

==== Head coach ====
In 1990, Buono was hired as Calgary's head coach by Stampeders president Norman Kwong. Calgary defeated Edmonton in the final game of the regular season to clinch first place in the West Division for the first time since 1971. Calgary would lose the West Final at home to Edmonton 43-23.

In 1991, Calgary finished second in the West, defeated the BC Lions in the Semi-Final, and beat Edmonton in the West Final in Edmonton. This was Calgary's first meaningful win in Edmonton since 1980. Calgary qualified for the Grey Cup for the first time since 1971, but ultimately lost to Toronto 36-21.

In 1992, Buono added General Manager to his title. Calgary finished with the most wins in the CFL for the first time since 1967. Calgary beat Winnipeg 24-10 in the Grey Cup, the team's first Grey Cup win since 1971. Buono was named CFL Coach of the Year for the first time.

In 1993, under Buono's leadership, Calgary started 10-0, and finished 15-3. Calgary was hosting the Grey Cup, but the Stampeders ended up losing the West Final at home to Edmonton, who would go on to win the Grey Cup. Buono was named CFL Coach of the Year for the second time.

Going into the 1994 season, Buono's Calgary teams had never lost a regular season game before August 1. In game 1 on July 8 in Saskatchewan, it looked like this streak would continue as Calgary held a 21-0 lead going into the third quarter. However, Saskatchewan scored 22 second half points, including the winning touchdown on the last play of the game. Despite this setback, Calgary finished 15-3, and scored a league record 698 points. Calgary's season would end much like it started, when BC came to Calgary for the West Final, and scored the winning touchdown on the last play of the game. BC would go on to win the Grey Cup.

In 1995, perennial outstanding quarterback, Doug Flutie, suffered an injury. In his absence, Jeff Garcia emerged, and helped guide Calgary to another 15-3 season. Calgary would come up short in the Grey Cup, losing 37-20 against the Baltimore Stallions, the first American team to win the Grey Cup.

Calgary would finish first in 1996 and second in 1997 (the year Buono earned his 100th win as a head coach), but did not win any playoff games. In 1998, Calgary finished first, defeated Edmonton in the West Final, and played Hamilton in the Grey Cup. Trailing by 1 point late in the game, Garcia engineered a drive which would allow placekicker Mark McLoughlin to kick the game-winning field goal. Calgary won 26-24, giving Buono his second Grey Cup win as a head coach.

In his final 4 seasons in Calgary, Buono reached the Grey Cup twice, losing in 1999, and winning in 2001 with a team that won 8 regular season games.

In Buono's 13 seasons as Calgary's head coach, he amassed a regular season record of 153–79–2. His 153 wins placed him second all-time in CFL history for a head coach at the time, and were the most wins for a CFL Head Coach with a single team.

He led the Stampeders to the playoffs for 12 consecutive seasons, including 8 first-place finishes and 5 straight from 1992 to 1996, and 11 Division Final appearances. His teams only missed the playoffs once, in 2002. The Stampeders went to 6 Grey Cup games under Buono, winning 3: 1992, 1998, and 2001, and losing 3: 1991, 1995, 1999. He left the franchise as its winningest coach in championships, allegedly only leaving because the Stampeders attempted to force him to play Kevin Feterik, the owner's son, as the starting quarterback, a charge both the Feteriks denied.

=== BC Lions ===
Buono was hired as head coach and general manager of the BC Lions prior to the 2003 season. In the first five seasons under Buono (2003–2007), the Lions went 62–27–1 in regular-season play, with five straight playoff appearances, four straight first-place finishes (2004–2007), and two Grey Cup appearances: a 27-19 loss to the Toronto Argonauts in 2004 and a 25-14 victory over the Montreal Alouettes in 2006. His teams went through a slight downturn for the following three seasons, including two that were under .500. His team returned to prominence in 2011 after they once again finished first in the west division and followed it with a 34-23 victory over the Winnipeg Blue Bombers in the 99th Grey Cup at home.

He announced his resignation as head coach of the Lions on December 5, 2011 to focus on his duties as general manager.

In 2014, he was inducted into the Canadian Football Hall of Fame.

From 2012 through the 2015 CFL season the Lions failed to win any playoff games, despite making the playoffs all four seasons. On December 2, 2015, the Lions announced that Buono would resume his position as head coach for the 2016 CFL season after head coach Jeff Tedford announced his resignation following a disappointing 7-11 season. On March 2, 2016, the Lions announced that they had extended Wally Buono's contract (as a head-coach/GM) through the 2017 CFL season.

Following the 2017 season, Buono announced he was relinquishing the General Manager position in order to focus on his head coaching duties. Ed Hervey was hired as the new GM of the Lions. Buono retains his position as the Vice President of Football Operations. Buono also stated that 2018 will be his final year as head coach. With 129 wins over two stints, he is the winningest coach in Lions history, and one of the few coaches to top the all-time wins list with two CFL teams.

=== Style ===
Buono, along with John Hufnagel, Calgary's offensive coordinator under Buono from 1990 to 1996, and Tedford, an offensive assistant coach in Calgary in the early 1990s, implemented an offensive system that Buono used throughout his coaching career. The five- and six-receiver package became a staple in Buono's teams' offences. Also, Buono felt it was important that backup quarterbacks get sufficient time in practice to develop.

Calgary under Buono went to Grey Cups with the following starting quarterbacks: Danny Barrett, Flutie (2), Garcia, Dave Dickenson, and Marcus Crandell. In BC, Buono's starting quarterbacks in Grey Cup games were Dickenson (2) and Travis Lulay. Other quarterbacks who had success under Buono were Henry Burris, Mike McCoy, Ben Sankey, Casey Printers, Spergon Wynn, Buck Pierce, Jarious Jackson, and Jonathon Jennings.

=== CFL coaching record ===
Team	Year	Regular season					Postseason		
Team	Year	Won	Lost	Ties	Win %	Finish	Won	Lost	Result
CGY	1990	11	6	1	.639	1st in West Division	0	1	Lost in Division Finals
CGY	1991	11	7	0	.611	2nd in West Division	2	1	Lost in 79th Grey Cup
CGY	1992	13	5	0	.722	1st in West Division	2	0	Won 80th Grey Cup
CGY	1993	15	3	0	.833	1st in West Division	1	1	Lost in Division Finals
CGY	1994	15	3	0	.833	1st in West Division	1	1	Lost in Division Finals
CGY	1995	15	3	0	.833	1st in North Division	2	1	Lost in 83rd Grey Cup
CGY	1996	13	5	0	.722	1st in West Division	0	1	Lost in Division Finals
CGY	1997	10	8	0	.556	2nd in West Division	0	1	Lost in Division Semi-Finals
CGY	1998	12	6	0	.667	1st in West Division	2	0	Won 86th Grey Cup
CGY	1999	12	6	0	.667	2nd in West Division	2	1	Lost in 87th Grey Cup
CGY	2000	12	5	1	.694	1st in West Division	0	1	Lost in Division Finals
CGY	2001	8	10	0	.444	2nd in West Division	3	0	Won 89th Grey Cup
CGY	2002	6	12	0	.333	5th in West Division	–	–	
CGY total		153	79	2	.659	8 West Division; Championships	15	9	3 Grey Cups
BC	2003	11	7	0	.611	4th in West Division	0	1	Lost in Division Semi-Finals
BC	2004	13	5	0	.722	1st in West Division	1	1	Lost in 92nd Grey Cup
BC	2005	12	6	0	.667	1st in West Division	0	1	Lost in Division Finals
BC	2006	13	5	0	.722	1st in West Division	2	0	Won 94th Grey Cup
BC	2007	14	3	1	.806	1st in West Division	0	1	Lost in Division Finals
BC	2008	11	7	0	.611	3rd in West Division	1	1	Lost in Division Finals
BC	2009	8	10	0	.444	4th in West Division	1	1	Lost in Division Finals
BC	2010	8	10	0	.444	3rd in West Division	0	1	Lost in Division Semi-Finals
BC	2011	11	7	0	.611	1st in West Division	2	0	Won 99th Grey Cup
BC	2016	12	6	0	.667	2nd in West Division	1	1	Lost in Division Final
BC	2017	7	11	0	.389	5th in West Division	–	–	
BC	2018	9	9	0	.500	4th in West Division	0	1	Lost in Division Semi-Finals
BC total		129	86	1	.600	5 West Division; Championships	8	9	2 Grey Cups
Total		282	165	3	.630	13 West Division; Championships	23	18	5 Grey Cups

== Wally Buono Award ==
The Wally Buono Award was established in 2003 by The Saint Bernard Pass Charitable Foundation for the purpose of recognizing Canada's top junior football player. The award is a national award. Recipients must prove their athletic and leadership ability on the field as well as a high level of leadership within their community. The Saint Bernard Pass Charitable Foundation is the Swiss-based foundation of Christina Saint Marche. The winners of the award are as follows:

- 2014 – LB Dylan Chapdelaine, Vancouver Island Raiders (BCFC/CJFL)
- 2013 – QB Asher Hastings, Regina Thunder (PCF/CJFL)
- 2012 – QB Jordan Yantz, Vancouver Island Raiders (BCFC/CJFL)
- 2011 – SB Michael Schaper, Vancouver Island Raiders (BCFC/CJFL)
- 2010 – DL Kleevens Jean-Louis, Châteauguay Raiders (QJFL)
- 2009 – RB Andrew Harris, Vancouver Island Raiders (BCFC/CJFL)
- 2008 – WR Cassidy Doneff, Calgary Colts (PFC/CJFL)
- 2007 – RB Tristan Jones, Edmonton Wildcats (PFC/CJFL)
- 2006 – QB Nate Friesen, Winnipeg Rifles (PFC/CJFL)
- 2005 – RB Jeff Halvorson, Posthumous, Okanagan Sun (BCFC/CJFL)
- 2004 – RB Chris Ciezki, Edmonton Huskies (PFC/CJFL)
- 2003 – RB Alan Giacalone, Calgary Colts (PFC/CJFL)

== See also ==
- List of Canadian Football League head coaches by wins
- List of National Football League head coaches with 200 wins

Awards
Preceded by Adam Rita; Don Matthews; Steve Buratto; Danny Maciocia; Marc Trestman	Grey Cup winning head coach 80th Grey Cup, 1992; 86th Grey Cup, 1998; 89th Grey Cup, 2001; 94th Grey Cup, 2006; 99th Grey Cup, 2011	Succeeded by Ron Lancaster; Ron Lancaster; Don Matthews; Kent Austin; Scott Milanovich
