= Jason Arakgi =

Canadian football player (born 1985)

Profile
- Position: Linebacker

Personal information
- Born: May 12, 1985 (age 41); Montreal, Quebec, Canada
- Listed height: 6 ft 2 in (1.88 m)
- Listed weight: 220 lb (100 kg)

Career information
- University: McMaster
- CFL draft: 2008: 3rd round, 20th overall pick

Career history
- 2008–2017: BC Lions

Awards and highlights
- Grey Cup champion (2011); John Agro Special Teams Award runner up (2009); CFL West All-Star (2009); Second-team CFL 2010s All-Decade Team
- Stats at CFL.ca

Jason Arakgi (born May 12, 1985) is a Canadian former professional football linebacker for the BC Lions of the Canadian Football League (CFL). He played CIS football for the McMaster Marauders.

== Professional career ==
Arakgi was drafted in the 3rd round of the 2008 CFL draft by the BC Lions. He made the active roster in his rookie year and played in all 18 regular season games and made an immediate impact on special teams as he recorded 32 special teams tackles in his first year. He continued to play on special teams throughout his career while also serving as a backup linebacker. On August 19, 2016, in a game against the Calgary Stampeders, Arakgi became the CFL's all-time leader in special teams tackles with 185, passing Wade Miller.

On June 17, 2017, he announced after playing in the team's final pre-season game that he was retiring from professional football. He finished his career with a CFL-record 190 special teams tackles in 155 regular season games, along with 26 defensive tackles and two forced fumbles. His special teams tackles record was surpassed by Mike Miller on August 21, 2021.

== Personal life ==
Arakgi was born in Montreal, Quebec, and grew up in Oakville, Ontario. He is the son of CFL receiver Nick Arakgi.
