= Dan McCullough =

Canadian gridiron footballer (born 1983)

Daniel McCullough
No. 55
- Position: Long snapper

Personal information
- Born: April 17, 1983 (age 43); Fredericton, New Brunswick, Canada
- Listed height: 6 ft 3 in (1.91 m)
- Listed weight: 243 lb (110 kg)

Career information
- College: Bishop's

Career history

Playing
- BC Lions (2007–2011)

Coaching
- UNB Red Bombers (2015–2018)

Awards and highlights
- Long Snapper of the Year 2010 (led all long snappers in Tackles); 99th Grey Cup champion
- Stats at CFL.ca (archive)

Dan McCullough (born April 17, 1983) is a Canadian former professional football long snapper who played for the BC Lions of the Canadian Football League (CFL). He was signed as an undrafted free agent by the Lions in 2007. He played CIS football with Bishop's University. McCullough retired on March 9, 2012, in order to pursue business interests. He was also the head coach for the UNB Red Bombers of the Atlantic Football League.
