= 94th Grey Cup =

2006 Canadian Football championship game

BC Lions	Montreal Alouettes
(13–5)	(10–8)
25	14
Head coach: Wally Buono	Head coach: Jim Popp
	1	2	3	4	Total
BC Lions	9	10	0	6	25
Montreal Alouettes	0	3	9	2	14
- Date: November 19, 2006
- Stadium: Canad Inns Stadium
- Location: Winnipeg
- Most Valuable Player: Dave Dickenson, QB (Lions)
- Most Valuable Canadian: Paul McCallum, K (Lions)
- National anthem: Eva Avila
- Coin toss: Hon. Gary Doer
- Referee: Jake Ireland
- Halftime show: Nelly Furtado feat. Saukrates
- Attendance: 44,786

Broadcasters
- Network: CBC, RDS, CBCHD
- Announcers: (CBC) Mark Lee, Chris Walby, Darren Flutie, Sean Millington, Greg Frers, Khari Jones, Elliotte Friedman
- Ratings: 4,012,000

The 94th Grey Cup game took place on November 19, 2006, at Canad Inns Stadium in Winnipeg, Manitoba before 44,786 fans. Ticket prices ranged from $141 and $275. The game decided the championship of the 2006 Canadian Football League season. The BC Lions defeated the Montreal Alouettes, 25–14.

== Grey Cup Festivities ==
The Grey Cup Festival consisted of four nights of entertainment at the Winnipeg Convention Centre, special events at the brand-new MTS Centre in the heart of the city, and a music festival in nightclubs around town. Regular fan favourite festivities include the CFL Player Awards and the Grey Cup Parade, the Grey Cup Gala Dinner, and the CFL Fan Experience – a family event featuring memorabilia, autographs, and interactive football. There was also a Trailer Park Boys breakfast featuring Randy, and Mr. Lahey. Famous musicians performed during the week-long festival that included Kenny Rogers, The Beach Boys, Sam Roberts Band, Tom Cochrane and Red Rider. At the game, Canadian Idol winner, Eva Avila sung the national anthem and Nelly Furtado performed at the halftime show, singing her two latest hits; "Promiscuous" (with Saukrates) and "Maneater".

TSN unveiled the TSN Top 50 CFL Players list as part of the Grey Cup week festivities.

== Game summary ==
BC Lions (25) - TDs, Ian Smart; FGs Paul McCallum (6); cons., McCallum.

Montreal Alouettes (14) - TDs, Robert Edwards; FGs Damon Duval; cons., Duval; safety touch (2).

First quarter
BC—FG McCallum 34-yard field goal 4:49 3 - 0 BC
BC—FG McCallum 35-yard field goal 12:26 6 - 0 BC
BC—FG McCallum 24-yard field goal 14:15 9 - 0 BC

Second quarter
BC—TD Smart 25-yard run (McCallum convert) 4:12 16 - 0 BC
MTL—FG Duval 43-yard field goal 13:18 16 - 3 BC
BC—FG McCallum 30-yard field goal 15:00 19 - 3 BC

Third quarter
MTL—Safety McCallum concedes in end zone 8:47 19 - 5 BC
MTL—TD Edwards 2-yard run (Duval convert)13:00 19 - 12 BC

Fourth quarter
BC—FG McCallum 21-yard field goal 4:17 22 - 12 BC
BC—FG McCallum 47-yard field goal 6:28 25 - 12 BC
MTL—Safety McCallum concedes in end zone 13:17 25 - 14 BC

Montreal won the coin toss and elected to defer to the second half. BC elected to go on defence on the first series, and Alouettes quarterback Anthony Calvillo threw two incomplete passes to begin the game. BC quarterback Dave Dickenson responded with four consecutive passes before rushing for a 12-yard gain setting up a first down on the Montreal 32. Two plays later, BC settled for a Paul McCallum 34-yard field goal to go ahead 3–0.

The Als were forced to punt again on their second possession, putting the Lions on their own 18-yard line. Joe Smith reeled off a 17-yard run on the first play, and after another first down, Dickenson hit Ryan Thelwell with a 14-yard pass past midfield. Paris Jackson made a 14-yard catch of his own but Buck Pierce, filling in for Dickenson, was sacked for a nine-yard loss by Adriano Belli. Dickenson came back in and hit Thelwell with a 16-yard pass, setting up a McCallum 35-yard field goal.

Aaron Hunt forced Calvillo to fumble on the next play, with Javier Glatt recovering the ball on the Montreal 23. This set up another McCallum field goal, this one from 24 yards out. BC was in possession of the ball for 10:26 of the opening quarter.

The Als finally forced BC to punt early in the second quarter, but were pinned on their own two-yard line on a coffin corner punt. Montreal got one first down before being forced to punt again. Starting on his own 43-yard line, Jackson made a highlight reel 18-yard catch. Ian Smart took it 25 yards the rest of the way for the game's opening touchdown.

After another two-and-out for the Als, the Montreal defence was able to stop the Lions on their own 28-yard line. Montreal got the ball back on its own 46 and got a couple of first downs to set up Damon Duval field goal attempt from the 47 that was kicked wide left and returned out of the end zone to negate a single point.

The Als defence held again, giving Montreal possession on its own 48-yard line with 2:26 remaining in the half. Calvillo hit Ben Cahoon for a 25-yard again. Duval was good on a 43-yard field goal, putting the Alouettes in flight.

McCallum booted a 30-yard field goal as the second half expired to put the Lions ahead 19–3.

Early in the third quarter, Dickenson appeared to fumble the ball on a sack by R-Kal Truluck which was recovered by Chip Cox who had nothing but daylight for a touchdown. But Jake Ireland ruled Dickenson was down before the losing the ball, which was overturned by instant replay, the first in Grey Cup history. By rule, the Als got the ball on the BC 42, and were forced to punt. Duval got a coffin corner kick, pinning the Lions on their own one-yard line. McCallum ultimately conceded two points.

The Alouettes went to work from their own 35-yard line. Calvillo hit Mike Vilimek on a 16-yard pass, then Cahoon with a 13-yard strike before calling his own number on a six-yard run. Robert Edwards ran for seven yards, followed by Thyron Anderson's 13-yard reception. Cahoon's 11-yard grab and Edwards' five-yard run before a BC offside penalty set up Edwards' two-yard touchdown run. With the convert Montreal trailed 19–12.

Tim Strickland almost came up with a diving interception on BC's next series.

McCallum booted a 21-yard field goal early in the fourth quarter to put the Lions in front by 10. He added a 47-yard field goal to tie a Grey Cup record with his sixth.

The most crucial play of the game came with 4:06 remaining in the 4th quarter. Calvillo drove the Alouettes down field within the Lions' 5 Yard line. On first down the Lions defense stuffed Edwards before the ball crossed the goal line. On the ensuing play, Calvillo again handed off to Edwards, but Javier Glatt leaped over the Montreal offensive line and knocked the football from Edwards hands. Otis Floyd recovered the ball for the Lions. At first, Jim Popp threw the challenge flag but later picked it up, a decision which would be criticized given the circumstance.

Even after such a swing in momentum, the Lions still had the ball at their one-yard line. The ball was handed off to Smith, who gained short yardage. Faced with second and long, and possibility of a punt that would give Montreal great field position, Dickenson completed a crucial pass to Geroy Simon that gave the Lions a first down.

McCallum gave up another safety with 1:43 remaining to make the score 25–14, but the Alouettes couldn't get closer than the BC 15-yard line before time ran out.

== Trivia ==
- This was BC Lions' fifth Grey Cup.
- After the game, the Lions broke the Grey Cup off its base during their on-field celebrations.
- The last Grey Cup game to be hosted in Winnipeg before this was the 86th Grey Cup in 1998.
- This was the final Grey Cup held at Canad Inns Stadium.

== 2006 CFL playoffs ==
=== Division Semi-finals ===
November 5

==== East Semi-Final ====
Team	Q1	Q2	Q3	Q4	Total
Winnipeg Blue Bombers	3	3	14	7	27
Toronto Argonauts	6	8	0	17	31

Michael Bishop spearheaded a late fourth quarter comeback, giving the Toronto Argonauts a 31–27 win over the Winnipeg Blue Bombers in an East Division semifinal game at the Rogers Centre.

Bishop completed touchdown passes to Arland Bruce and R. Jay Soward in the final eight minutes, turning a 27–17 deficit into a chance to play the Montreal Alouettes in the East Final.

Bishop came in for an ineffective Damon Allen. Bishop finished 3-of-5 for 110 yards. Allen went 15-of-28 for 219 yard with a TD and an interception. Toronto head coach Mike "Pinball" Clemons made the change under center to catch Winnipeg off guard and it worked.

Charles Roberts had two touchdown runs for the Blue Bombers, who failed to hold on to the 10-point fourth-quarter lead. He ended with 30 rushed for 179 yards. After Winnipeg went up 27–17 on Kevin Glenn's 27-yard TD pass to Chris Brazzell, the Argonauts began their comeback.

First, Bruce hauled in a 78-yard catch-and-run from Bishop, making it a 27–24 contest. Then, a little later, Bishop hit Soward for a 15-yard score to give the Argonauts the win. Winnipeg had one last chance, but Orlando Steinauer picked off Glenn inside the final minute at the Toronto 22. Glenn ended 12-of-22 for 224 yards with a TD and two picks.

Toronto led 6–3 after one quarter. The Argo's Noel Prefontaine hit 37- and 28-yard field goals after Troy Westwood opened the scoring with a 42-yarder for Winnipeg. Prefontaine made it a 7–3 game early in the second with a 25-yard single, but Westwood answered with a 23-yard field goal. Allen then hit Michael Palmer with a 23-yard TD strike to make it 14–6 heading into halftime.

Winnipeg then scored 14 third-quarter points thanks to one-yard and 11-yard TD runs by Roberts. Toronto though drew within 20–17 on a Prefontaine 38-yard field goal early in the fourth quarter.

==== West Semi-Final ====
Team	Q1	Q2	Q3	Q4	Total
Saskatchewan Roughriders	3	9	8	10	30
Calgary Stampeders	4	17	0	0	21

Kenton Keith's 14-yard touchdown run with 2:20 remaining cemented a second-half comeback, as the Saskatchewan Roughriders pulled out a gritty 30–21 win over the Calgary Stampeders in the Western Division Semifinal at a chilly McMahon Stadium.

Kerry Joseph threw for 180 yards on 17-of-31 completions and one touchdown, and Keith finished the day with 141 yards on 16 carries and two scores. Defensive back, James Johnson recorded two interceptions for the Roughriders, who ran off 25 unanswered points, 18 coming in the second-half. The Riders advanced to the West championship to take on the BC Lions at BC Place Stadium.

Henry Burris completed 16-of-32 passes for 198 yards, no touchdowns, and was picked off four times and fumbled once. He did run for Calgary's only offensive touchdown in the game. Marcus Howell also took a punt 57 yards for a touchdown for the Stampeders, who hurt their cause by committing six turnovers. Trailing by nine points with little more than two minutes left, Calgary could not score on either of their last two possessions. On the first chance, kicker Sandro DeAngelis pushed a 40-yard field goal attempt wide right. Their final charge saw Burris throw two balls into the end zone that were batted down by defenders, and the third-down attempt picked off to end the game.

Calgary led after one quarter, 4–3, on a DeAngelis 39-yard kick and a single. Things picked up in the second, as the Riders went ahead, 5–4, on a safety concession. The Stampeders regained the lead, 11–5, when Howell electrified the home crowd with his punt return touchdown. The lead was boosted to 14–5 on a successful 25-yard DeAngelis field goal attempt. Calgary increased the margin to 21–5 when Burris sneaked over the goal line amidst a mass of bodies from two yards out, but the Riders closed out the first half strongly. Joseph led the charge from his own 35-yard line and hooked up with Matt Dominguez for a 22-yard strike, capping an eight-play, 75-yard drive which closed the gap to 21–12 at the break.

The Riders came out blazing in the second half. After taking the opening kickoff to their own 34, Keith found a seam up the middle on the first play from scrimmage and bolted 76 yards for the score, cutting the Calgary lead to two at 21–19. The lead was trimmed closer to 21–20 when Howell decided to run out of the back of the end zone rather than fielding a Luca Congi punt, granting Saskatchewan a valuable point. When Congi split the uprights from 41 yards out with 10:26 left in the fourth, the Riders had their first lead since the second quarter. His three points were set up when Eddie Davis intercepted a Burris pass which gave Saskatchewan the ball in Calgary territory.

Joseph and the Roughriders then put the nail in the Stampeders' coffin. A four-play, 66-yard drive was highlighted by Corey Grant's 37-yard reception down to the Calgary 25. Two plays later, Keith's run provided insurance for the victory.

=== Division finals ===
November 12

==== East Final ====
Team	Q1	Q2	Q3	Q4	Total
Toronto Argonauts	3	0	7	14	24
Montreal Alouettes	3	13	14	3	33

Robert Edwards rushed for 137 yards and a touchdown as Montreal advanced to the Grey Cup with a 33–24 victory over the Toronto Argonauts in the East Division final. The Alouettes will now face the BC Lions for the CFL championship.

Anthony Calvillo completed 14-of-22 passes for 252 yards with a touchdown and an interception for Montreal (11–8), who own a 4–1 record against the Argonauts in the last five East finals. Bishop replaced an ineffective Damon Allen in the second half and almost rallied Toronto to victory. The former Heisman Trophy finalist from Kansas State University completed 17-of-24 passes for 159 yards with two touchdowns and a pick for the Argonauts (11–9).

In what was most likely his last CFL action, Ricky Williams ran nine times for 57 yards and a touchdown, while also catching three passes for 34 yards. Williams signed with Toronto after he violated the NFL's substance abuse policy for the fourth time, resulting in a one-year suspension from the league.

Trailing 30–10 in the fourth quarter, Bishop orchestrated two late scoring drives to pull Toronto within six. Bishop first hooked up with Michael Palmer for an 11-yard touchdown that made it a 30–17 games. A pass-interference call in the end zone later in the fourth gave the Argonauts a first down on the one-yard and Williams dove across the goal line to cut Toronto's deficit to six, 30–24. However, Damon Duval nailed a 44-yard field goal to ice the game and send Montreal to the Grey Cup.

The Alouettes drew first blood on Duval's 37-yard boot in the first quarter, but Toronto answered with Noel Prefonatine's 22-yard kick. Montreal then outscored Toronto 13–0 in the second quarter to take a 16–3 lead into the break. Duval connected on a 41-yard kick before Edwards' TD run from four yards out. Duval's 22-yard field goal with two seconds left in the first half gave the Alouettes a 13-point lead.

Toronto appeared to build some momentum to start the second half, as Bashir Levingston returned the kickoff 50 yards deep into Montreal territory. However, on the Argonauts' first play from scrimmage, Mark Estelle stepped in front of an Allen pass and ran it back 78-yards for at touchdown.

Bishop then took over for Allen on Toronto's next possession and found Arland Bruce for a 23-yard touchdown reception that made it 23–10. The Argonauts then got the ball back with a chance to build off the momentum from Bruce's TD, but an overturned call on a Williams' fumble changed the complexion of the game. Williams was originally ruled down on a run, but Montreal challenged the call and the ruling was reversed.

On the next play, Calvillo hooked up with Thyron Anderson for a 57-yard touchdown that made it a 30–10 game.

==== West Final ====
Team	Q1	Q2	Q3	Q4	Total
Saskatchewan Roughriders	3	1	14	0	18
BC Lions	3	26	3	13	45

Dave Dickenson completed 27-of-37 passes for 274 yards and three touchdowns, as the BC Lions destroyed the Saskatchewan Roughriders, 45–18, to score a franchise playoff-record points total and reach the Grey Cup against Montreal. The Lions will play the Montreal Alouettes, who beat the Toronto Argonauts 33–24 in the East Final. BC, who finished first in the West Division for the third straight season, lost the 2004 Grey Cup to Toronto and were downed by Edmonton in the 2005 West Final.

Joe Smith rushed for 116 yards on 19 carries for the Lions, who finished first in the West Division with the league's best record at 13–5. Paris Jackson caught two touchdowns with 66 receiving yards and Jason Clermont had 98 receiving yards on nine catches.

Kerry Joseph completed 15-of-23 passes for 210 yards with one interception and one touchdown for the Roughriders (9–9), who qualified for the division final by upsetting Calgary, 30–21. Kenton Keith scored a pair of third-quarter touchdowns.

BC got going on a 21-yard field goal by Paul McCallum with 11:40 remaining in the first. Saskatchewan answered on a 40-yarder by Luca Congi with 2:39 to go for a 3–3 first quarter score. BC blew the game open with a 26-point second quarter. Dickenson hooked up with Jackson on a 14-yard touchdown pass with 11:55 left in the second. Congi then conceded a safety with 10:20 to go for a 12–3 BC lead. About five minutes later, Dickenson found Smith for a five-yard touchdown pass. McCallum kicked a 20-yard field goal with 1:26 remaining, and the Lions mustered another score when Dickenson threw a 35-yard touchdown pass to Jackson with just 21 seconds on the clock.

Saskatchewan finally got a point as Congi converted a 22-yard single as time expired for a 29–4 advantage. McCallum kicked a 37-yard field goal with 9:38 to go in the third before the Roughriders got going. First, Joseph hooked up with Keith on a 38-yard touchdown pass with a little over two minutes to go. Then, after Geroy Simon fumbled, Keith kept the ball on the ground next for a four-yard rushing touchdown as time expired for a 32–18 Saskatchewan deficit.

The Lions put the game away in the fourth. McCallum kicked a pair of field goals of 18 yards and 41 yards, respectively. Smith then scored a six-yard rushing touchdown with 2:30 remaining for the final margin.
