= 99th Grey Cup =

2011 Canadian Football championship game

Winnipeg Blue Bombers	BC Lions
(10–8)	(11–7)
23	34
Head coach: Paul LaPolice	Head coach: Wally Buono
	1	2	3	4	Total
Winnipeg Blue Bombers	0	6	3	14	23
BC Lions	11	3	10	10	34
- Date: November 27, 2011
- Stadium: BC Place Stadium
- Location: Vancouver
- Most Valuable Player: Travis Lulay, QB (Lions)
- Most Valuable Canadian: Andrew Harris, RB (Lions)
- National anthem: Jann Arden
- Coin toss: Rick Hansen
- Referee: Andre Proulx
- Halftime show: Nickelback
- Attendance: 54,313

Broadcasters
- Network: English: TSN/TSN HD; French: RDS/RDS HD
- Announcers: (TSN): Chris Cuthbert, Glen Suitor, Dave Randorf, Jock Climie, Matt Dunigan, Chris Schultz (RDS): Denis Casavant, Pierre Vercheval, Marc Labrecque, Mike Sutherland, Claude Mailhot
- Ratings: 4.6 million

The 99th Grey Cup was a Canadian football game between the East Division champion Winnipeg Blue Bombers and the West Division champion BC Lions to decide the champion of the Canadian Football League in the 2011 season. The Lions defeated the Blue Bombers 34–23 and became the first team in CFL history to win the Grey Cup after starting the season with five straight losses. They also became the first team to win the championship game at home since the 1994 Lions did it in the 82nd Grey Cup, and were only the fourth team in the modern era to do so. This, a rematch of the 76th Grey Cup, was the second time that these two teams met for the championship.

The game took place on November 27, 2011, at BC Place Stadium in Vancouver, British Columbia. This was the eighth Grey Cup game played at BC Place, and the 15th in Vancouver, the most recent previous one having been the 93rd Grey Cup between the Montreal Alouettes and Edmonton Eskimos.

BC head coach Wally Buono won his fifth Grey Cup, tying a CFL record. In his first Grey Cup, Lions quarterback Travis Lulay threw two second-half touchdown passes and was named Grey Cup MVP. Lions tailback Andrew Harris, also playing in his first championship game, was the Most Valuable Canadian.

== Host city ==
On February 27, 2009, news agencies reported—and the league confirmed—that the game had been awarded to Vancouver. The game was played at the home of the BC Lions, BC Place Stadium. It was the fifteenth Grey Cup to be held in Vancouver (and eighth at BC Place Stadium), the most recent previous one having been the 93rd Grey Cup in 2005, between the Montreal Alouettes and Edmonton Eskimos, which the Eskimos won 38-35 in overtime. BC Place had recently completed a roof replacement, and this was the first Grey Cup played under its new retractable roof.

The game was announced as a sellout on July 21, 2011, thirty days after the tickets went on sale to the public and 129 before the game itself. This surpassed the previous Vancouver record, set when the 93rd Grey Cup game was sold out on October 7, 2005. The sellout attendance for the 99th Grey Cup was 54,313. Prices ranged from $125 to $375 when tickets were released to the general public in June 2011, but 2011 Lions season ticket holders were able to get priority seating at prices ranging from $100 to $295.

== Broadcasting ==
In Canada, the game was televised in high-definition by both TSN (English) and RDS (French). TSN play-by-play was provided by Chris Cuthbert, while Glen Suitor provided colour commentary. Play-by-play man Denis Casavant and colour commentator Pierre Vercheval announced the game for RDS. The RDS broadcast team also included Marc Labrecque, Mike Sutherland and Claude Mailhot.

The game was watched on television by an average audience of 4.6 million people. Although this was down from the 6.04 million viewers that the 98th Grey Cup drew, it was still the highest-rated television program of the week in Canada. In the Vancouver market, over half the population watched the game, and more than 11 million Canadians overall watched some or all of the broadcast on TSN and RDS.

== Entertainment ==
Before the game, Canadian singer-songwriter Jann Arden sang the national anthem entirely in English. The Pepsi Max Halftime Show was performed by Vancouver-based rock band Nickelback. They played songs off their albums All The Right Reasons, Dark Horse, and Here and Now.

On the Friday preceding the championship game, the CFL Alumni Association organized a fan meet-and-greet hosted by stand-up comedian Ron James to benefit the research against concussions in football.

== Path to the Grey Cup ==
=== Winnipeg Blue Bombers ===
The Winnipeg Blue Bombers entered the 2011 season with almost a completely unchanged roster than the team that went 4–14 and finished in last place in the East Division the year before. The Blue Bombers were considered to be a non-contender by many sports writers at the start of the season. However, the Bombers shocked many by getting off to a fast start, going 7–1 in their first 8 games. Although the Bombers started to slip in their on field performance during the second half of the season, they still won enough games to not only make the playoffs, but to finish in 1st place in the East Division for the first time since 2001, finishing with a 10–8 record.

The Bombers earned a bye into the Division Final by virtue of winning the tie-breaker for first place over the Montreal Alouettes. On November 20, 2011, the Blue Bombers faced the 8–10 Hamilton Tiger-Cats in the East Division Final at Canad Inns Stadium in Winnipeg, Manitoba. The Blue Bombers came out on top in a tough defensive battle, defeating the Ti-Cats 19–3 on a cold day in Winnipeg, advancing to the Grey Cup game for the first time since 2007.

=== BC Lions ===
Unlike the Bombers, the Lions got off to a slow start in 2011, losing their first five games before finally getting their first win of the season over the Saskatchewan Roughriders in week 6. After suffering one more defeat to the Winnipeg Blue Bombers the next week, the Lions went on a remarkable 8-game winning streak which jolted them all the way to the top of CFL West Division standings. The Lions would end up finishing the season in 1st place in the West Division with an 11–7 record, winning 11 of their last 13 games after starting the season 0–5.

In the West Division Final on November 20, 2011, the Lions faced the Edmonton Eskimos (also 11–7). The Eskimos previously beaten the Lions in the 2005 playoffs when Vancouver last hosted the Grey Cup game, denying the Lions a chance to play for the Cup in front of a home crowd. This time, the Lions would have that chance as they easily handled the Eskimos 40–23, advancing to the Grey Cup game on their home turf.

=== Head-to-head ===
Winnipeg and BC met twice during the regular season. The Bombers won both games against the Lions, sweeping both meetings. The first game was a 25–20 win by the Bombers at Canad Inns Stadium in Winnipeg on July 28, 2011, which was the first game played after former Lion defensive line coach and then Bomber defensive line and assistant head coach Richard Harris suddenly died on July 26, 2011. Both teams joined each other at the center of the field for a moment of silence before the game. The second game at Empire Field in Vancouver on August 13, 2011, was much more decisive with the Bombers defeating the Lions by a score of 30–17. Despite the Blue Bombers sweep over the Lions, the Bombers sudden decline along with the Lions resurgence resulted in BC being named Grey Cup favourites.

Winnipeg and BC had only met once before in the Grey Cup game, the 76th Grey Cup in Ottawa in 1988. The Lions were also favoured in that game, but the Blue Bombers edged the Lions 22–21 in front of 50,604 fans in Ottawa.

== Game summary ==
Winnipeg Blue Bombers (23) – TDs Greg Carr, Terrence Edwards; FGs Justin Palardy (3); cons., Palardy (2).

BC Lions (34) – TDs, Andrew Harris, Kierrie Johnson, Arland Bruce; FGs Paul McCallum (4); cons., McCallum (3); singles, McCallum (1).

First Quarter
BC – TD Harris 19 run (6:54) (McCallum convert) 7 – 0 BC
BC – FG McCallum 22 (3:42) 10 – 0 BC
BC – Single McCallum 57 punt (00:48) 11 – 0 BC
Second Quarter
BC – FG McCallum 16 (4:44) 14 – 0 BC
WPG – FG Palardy 30 (2:41) 14 – 3 BC
WPG – FG Palardy 15 (00:33) 14 – 6 BC
Third Quarter
WPG – FG Palardy 33 (10:25) 14 – 9 BC
BC – FG McCallum 22 (2:59) 17 – 9 BC
BC – TD Johnson 66 pass from Lulay (McCallum convert) (00:30) 24 – 9 BC
Fourth Quarter
BC – TD Bruce 6 pass from Lulay (McCallum convert) (7:13) 31 – 9 BC
WPG – TD Carr 45 pass from Pierce (Palardy convert) (3:51) 31 – 16 BC
WPG – TD Edwards 13 pass from Pierce (Palardy convert) (1:52) 31 – 23 BC
BC – FG McCallum 34 (1:20) 34 – 23 BC

== CFL playoffs ==
=== Playoff bracket ===
November 13: Division Semi-Finals
East
E3	Hamilton Tiger-Cats	52*
E2	Montreal Alouettes	44
West
W3	Calgary Stampeders	19
W2	Edmonton Eskimos	33

November 20: Division Finals
E3	Hamilton Tiger-Cats	3
E1	Winnipeg Blue Bombers	19
W2	Edmonton Eskimos	23
W1	BC Lions	40

November 27: 99th Grey Cup; BC Place Stadium – Vancouver
E1	Winnipeg Blue Bombers	23
W1	BC Lions	34

*-Team won in overtime.

=== Division Semi-Finals ===
==== East Semi-Final ====
Date and time: Sunday, November 13, 1 PM Eastern Standard Time
Venue: Olympic Stadium, Montreal, Quebec

Team	Q1	Q2	Q3	Q4	OT	Total
Hamilton Tiger-Cats	10	14	3	17	8	52
Montreal Alouettes	3	13	7	21	0	44

==== West Semi-Final ====
Date and time: Sunday, November 13, 3 PM Mountain Standard Time
Venue: Commonwealth Stadium, Edmonton, Alberta

Team	Q1	Q2	Q3	Q4	Total
Calgary Stampeders	8	1	6	4	19
Edmonton Eskimos	3	22	1	7	33

=== Division Finals ===
==== East Final ====
Date and time: Sunday, November 20, 12 PM Central Standard Time
Venue: Canad Inns Stadium, Winnipeg, Manitoba

Team	Q1	Q2	Q3	Q4	Total
Hamilton Tiger-Cats	3	0	0	0	3
Winnipeg Blue Bombers	0	10	3	6	19

==== West Final ====
Date and time: Sunday, November 20, 1:30 PM Pacific Standard Time
Venue: BC Place Stadium, Vancouver, BC

Team	Q1	Q2	Q3	Q4	Total
Edmonton Eskimos	0	3	6	14	23
BC Lions	6	20	7	7	40
