= 2014 Winnipeg Blue Bombers season =

Canadian football team season

- General manager: Kyle Walters
- Head coach: Mike O'Shea
- Home stadium: Investors Group Field

Results
- Record: 7–11
- Division place: 5th, West
- Playoffs: did not qualify

Uniform

The 2014 Winnipeg Blue Bombers season was the 57th season for the team in the Canadian Football League (CFL) and their 82nd overall. The Blue Bombers finished with a 7–11 record, although this was a four-game improvement upon their disastrous 3–15 record from 2013, the Blue Bombers still finished last place in the West Division and failed to make the playoffs for the third straight year. It was also the fifth time in six seasons that the Blue Bombers would fail to qualify for the CFL playoffs.

The Blue Bombers played in the West Division after having played in the East Division for eight seasons.

== Offseason ==
=== CFL draft ===
The 2014 CFL draft took place on May 13, 2014. The Blue Bombers had five selections in the seven-round draft, after trading their original second-round selection and Alex Hall to Saskatchewan for Patrick Neufeld and a fourth round selection in the 2015 CFL draft. They traded two third round picks, another obtained from Toronto, to Saskatchewan to get back into the second round. Finally their fifth-round selection was traded along with Anthony Woodson to Toronto for the other third-round selection and Marc Parenteau.

| Round | Pick | Player | Position | School/Club team |
|---|---|---|---|---|
| 1 | 2 | Matthias Goossen | OL | Simon Fraser |
| 2 | 17 | Jesse Briggs | LB | McGill |
| 4 | 29 | Derek Jones | DB | Simon Fraser |
| 6 | 47 | Quinn Everett | DL | Mount Allison |
| 7 | 56 | Aram Eisho | LB | McMaster |

== Preseason ==
| Game | Kickoff | Date | Opponent | Results | | TV | Venue | Attendance | Recap |
| Game | Kickoff | Date | Opponent | Score | Record | TV | Venue | Attendance | Recap |
|---|---|---|---|---|---|---|---|---|---|
| A | Mon, June 9 | 7:30 p.m. CDT | vs. Toronto Argonauts | L 22–24 | 0–1 | TSN | Investors Group Field | 24,000 | Recap |
| B | Sat, June 14 | 8:00 p.m. CDT | at Calgary Stampeders | L 20–23 | 0–2 | TSN2 | McMahon Stadium | 27,103 | Recap |
| C | Bye | | | | | | | | |

== Regular season ==
=== Standings ===
West Division
| Team | GP | W | L | T | PF | PA | Pts | |
|---|---|---|---|---|---|---|---|---|
| Calgary Stampeders | 18 | 15 | 3 | 0 | 511 | 347 | 30 | Details |
| Edmonton Eskimos | 18 | 12 | 6 | 0 | 492 | 340 | 24 | Details |
| Saskatchewan Roughriders | 18 | 10 | 8 | 0 | 399 | 441 | 20 | Details |
| BC Lions | 18 | 9 | 9 | 0 | 380 | 365 | 18 | Details |
| Winnipeg Blue Bombers | 18 | 7 | 11 | 0 | 397 | 481 | 14 | Details |

=== Schedule ===
| Week | Date | Kickoff | Opponent | Results | | TV | Venue | Attendance | Summary |
| Week | Date | Kickoff | Opponent | Score | Record | TV | Venue | Attendance | Summary |
|---|---|---|---|---|---|---|---|---|---|
| 1 | Thur, June 26 | 7:30 p.m. CDT | vs. Toronto Argonauts | W 45–21 | 1–0 | TSN/RDS2 | Investors Group Field | 24,872 | Recap |
| 2 | Thur, July 3 | 7:30 p.m. CDT | vs. Ottawa Redblacks | W 36–28 | 2–0 | TSN/RDS2 | Investors Group Field | 27,553 | Recap |
| 3 | Fri, July 11 | 6:00 p.m. CDT | at Montreal Alouettes | W 34–33 | 3–0 | TSN/RDS | Molson Stadium | 20,384 | Recap |
| 4 | Thur, July 17 | 7:30 p.m. CDT | vs. Edmonton Eskimos | L 3–26 | 3–1 | TSN/ESPN2/RDS2 | Investors Group Field | 30,976 | Recap |
| 5 | Fri, July 25 | 9:00 p.m. CDT | at BC Lions | W 23–6 | 4–1 | TSN | BC Place | 25,321 | Recap |
| 6 | Thur, July 31 | 6:00 p.m. CDT | at Hamilton Tiger-Cats | W 27–26 | 5–1 | TSN/RDS2 | Ron Joyce Stadium | 6,500 | Recap |
| 7 | Thur, Aug 7 | 7:30 p.m. CDT | vs. Saskatchewan Roughriders | L 17–23 | 5–2 | TSN | Investors Group Field | 33,234 | Recap |
| 8 | Tues, Aug 12 | 6:30 p.m. CDT | at Toronto Argonauts | L 21–38 | 5–3 | TSN/RDS2 | Rogers Centre | 18,106 | Recap |
| 9 | Fri, Aug 22 | 7:30 p.m. CDT | vs. Montreal Alouettes | W 24–16 | 6–3 | TSN/RDS | Investors Group Field | 29,881 | Recap |
| 10 | Sun, Aug 31 | 3:00 p.m. CDT | at Saskatchewan Roughriders | L 30–35 | 6–4 | TSN | Mosaic Stadium | 33,427 | Recap |
| 11 | Sun, Sept 7 | 3:00 p.m. CDT | vs. Saskatchewan Roughriders | L 24–30 | 6–5 | TSN/ESPN | Investors Group Field | 33,234 | Recap |
| 12 | Sat, Sept 13 | 9:00 p.m. CDT | at BC Lions | L 9–26 | 6–6 | TSN | BC Place | 27,754 | Recap |
| 13 | Bye | | | | | | | | |
| 14 | Sat, Sept 27 | 5:30 p.m. CDT | vs. Hamilton Tiger-Cats | L 11–16 | 6–7 | TSN | Investors Group Field | 28,534 | Recap |
| 15 | Fri, Oct 3 | 6:00 p.m. CDT | at Ottawa Redblacks | L 20–42 | 6–8 | TSN | TD Place Stadium | 24,242 | Recap |
| 16 | Mon, Oct 13 | 3:30 p.m. CDT | at Edmonton Eskimos | L 9–41 | 6–9 | TSN/RDS2 | Commonwealth Stadium | 28,065 | Recap |
| 17 | Sat, Oct 18 | 6:00 p.m. CDT | vs. Calgary Stampeders | L 23–33 | 6–10 | TSN/RDS2 | Investors Group Field | 22,320 | Recap |
| 18 | Sat, Oct 25 | 6:00 p.m. CDT | vs. BC Lions | L 23–28 | 6–11 | TSN | Investors Group Field | 24,223 | Recap |
| 19 | Sat, Nov 1 | 3:00 p.m. CDT | at Calgary Stampeders | W 18–13 | 7–11 | TSN/RDS2 | McMahon Stadium | 27,076 | Recap |
| 20 | Bye | | | | | | | | |

== Roster ==
2014 Winnipeg Blue Bombers final roster
| Quarterbacks: 16 Robert Marve; 6 Josh Portis; 5 Drew Willy; Running backs: 34 Paris Cotton; 26 Carl Fitzgerald; 32 Cameron Marshall; 39 Michel-Pierre Pontbriand; 29 Carl Volny; Receivers: 84 Romby Bryant; 80 Brett Carter; 89 Clarence Denmark; 83 Julian Feoli-Gudino; 18 Jerrell Jackson; 87 Rory Kohlert; 81 Cory Watson; 86 Justin Wilson | Offensive linemen: 59 Jace Daniels T; 61 Matthias Goossen G/C; 64 Chris Greaves G; 58 Gord Hinse G/C; 69 Glenn January T; 69 Dan Knapp T/G; 65 Steve Morley C; Defensive linemen: 56 Marvin Booker DE; 93 Kashawn Fraser DE; 48 Deantre Harlan DT; 91 Greg Hickman DT; 45 Ameet Pall DT; 52 Louie Richardson DE; 95 Jake Thomas DT | Linebackers: 40 Jesse Briggs; 23 Desia Dunn; 47 Kyle Jones; 27 Teague Sherman; 13 Don Unamba; 38 Ian Wild; Defensive backs: 2 Matt Bucknor; 25 Bruce Johnson; 41 Derek Jones; 31 Maurice Leggett; 0 Johnny Sears; 8 Chris Randle; 7 Demond Washington; 33 Dan West | Special teams: 70 Lirim Hajrullahu K/P; Reserve roster: 24 Sam McGuffie RB; Practice roster: 22 Daivon Dumas DB; 65 Jarvis Jones T; 51 Abraham Kromah LB; 27 Marty Markett DB; -- Ezra Millington WR; 35 Kyle Norris LB; -- Shea Pierre DB; 42 Rene Stephan LB; 14 Aaron Woods SB; Suspended: 4 Donovan Alexander DB | Injured list: 44 Zach Anderson DT; 12 Brian Brohm QB; 49 Mike Cornell LB; -- Thaddeus Gibson DE; 68 Cordaro Howard G/T; 19 Aaron Kelly WR; 1 E. J. Kuale LB; 94 Ryan Lucas DT; 17 Nick Moore SB; 53 Patrick Neufeld G; 18 Graig Newman DB; 90 Greg Peach DE; 9 Mike Renaud P; 15 Troy Stoudermire DB; 21 Alex Suber DB; 92 Bryant Turner DT; 57 Devin Tyler T; 98 Jason Vega DE; Italics indicate International player |
