= 2011 Winnipeg Blue Bombers season =

Canadian football team season

- General manager: Joe Mack
- Head coach: Paul LaPolice
- Home stadium: Canad Inns Stadium

Results
- Record: 10–8
- Division place: 1st, East
- Playoffs: Lost Grey Cup
- Team MOP: Jovon Johnson
- Team MOC: Cory Watson
- Team MOR: Clarence Denmark

Uniform

The 2011 Winnipeg Blue Bombers was the 54th season for the team in the Canadian Football League (CFL) and their 79th overall. The Blue Bombers finished in first place in the East Division with a 10–8 record. The team clinched their first playoff berth since 2008 on October 7, 2011, after a 33–17 win over the Hamilton Tiger-Cats. On November 20, 2011, The Blue Bombers defeated the Tiger-Cats 19–3 in the East Final, advancing to the 99th Grey Cup and extending their Grey Cup appearances record to 24. However, the Bombers lost the Grey Cup game 34–23 to the BC Lions, extending their drought to 21 years without a Grey Cup championship. Their Grey Cup appearance marked their final playoff game played in five seasons, failing to make the playoffs in the four subsequent seasons following their loss to the Lions team. Incidentally, their first playoff game subsequent to their four-year playoff drought was also against the same BC Lions team they lost in the Grey Cup game in 2011, losing in a 32-31 come-from-behind victory for the Lions, ending the 2016 Winnipeg Blue Bombers season. Additionally, the Blue Bombers wouldn't host another playoff game again until the 2017 CFL season, this time losing to the Edmonton Eskimos 39–32.

The Blue Bombers set a franchise record for season tickets sold with 21,155 with 2011 being marketed as the last season at Canad Inns Stadium before the move to Investors Group Field. This record was in turn broken in 2012 after more than 22,000 were sold.

== Offseason ==
=== CFL draft ===
The 2011 CFL draft took place on Sunday, May 8, 2011. The Blue Bombers had six selections in the draft, and, for the first time since 1975, had the first overall selection in the draft. Winnipeg selected linebacker Henoc Muamba with the pick, making him the first St. Francis Xavier X-Men player to be drafted first overall. The Bombers also had the fourth overall pick after trading Steven Jyles to the Toronto Argonauts, in which they selected Jade Etienne from the University of Saskatchewan. Winnipeg also selected Kito Poblah in the 2011 supplemental draft, and must forfeit a first-round 2012 draft pick.

Round	Pick	Player	Position	School/Club team
1	1	Henoc Muamba	LB	St. Francis Xavier
1	4	Jade Etienne	WR	Saskatchewan
3	17	Brendan Dunn	DL/OL	Western Ontario
4	24	Paul Swiston	OL	Calgary
5	32	Carl Volny	RB	Central Michigan
6	41	Liam Mahoney	WR	Concordia

== Preseason ==
Week	Date	Opponent	Score	Result	Attendance	Record
A	Thurs, June 16	at Montreal Alouettes	27–15	Loss	21,223	0–1
B	Thurs, June 23	vs. Toronto Argonauts	30–23	Loss	29,117	0–2

== Regular season ==
=== Season standings ===
East Division
Team	GP	W	L	T	PF	PA	Pts	
Winnipeg Blue Bombers	18	10	8	0	432	432	20	Details
Montreal Alouettes	18	10	8	0	515	468	20	Details
Hamilton Tiger-Cats	18	8	10	0	481	478	16	Details
Toronto Argonauts	18	6	12	0	397	498	12	Details

=== Season schedule ===
Week	Date	Opponent	Score	Result	Attendance	Record
1	Fri, July 1	at Hamilton Tiger-Cats	24–16	Win	23,852	1–0
2	Fri, July 8	vs. Toronto Argonauts	22–16	Win	27,638	2–0
3	Thurs, July 14	vs. Calgary Stampeders	21–20	Loss	27,890	2–1
4	Sat, July 23	at Toronto Argonauts	33–24	Win	21,189	3–1
5	Thurs, July 28	vs. BC Lions	25–20	Win	29,533	4–1
6	Fri, Aug 5	vs. Edmonton Eskimos	28–16	Win	29,533	5–1
7	Sat, Aug 13	at BC Lions	30–17	Win	24,131	6–1
8	Bye					6–1
9	Fri, Aug 26	vs. Hamilton Tiger-Cats	30–27	Win	30,338	7–1
10	Sun, Sept 4	at Saskatchewan Roughriders	27–7	Loss	30,048	7–2
11	Sun, Sept 11	vs. Saskatchewan Roughriders	45–23	Loss	30,518	7–3
12	Sun, Sept 18	at Montreal Alouettes	25–23	Win	24,642	8–3
13	Sat, Sept 24	at Toronto Argonauts	25–24	Loss	19,108	8–4
14	Fri, Sept 30	vs. Montreal Alouettes	32–26	Loss	30,447	8–5
15	Fri, Oct 7	at Hamilton Tiger-Cats	33–17	Win	23,268	9–5
16	Sat, Oct 15	at Edmonton Eskimos	24–10	Loss	30,734	9–6
17	Sat, Oct 22	vs. Montreal Alouettes	26–25	Win	30,360	10–6
18	Fri, Oct 28	vs. Toronto Argonauts	27–22	Loss	29,751	10–7
19	Sat, Nov 5	at Calgary Stampeders	30–24	Loss	29,076	10–8

== Roster ==
2011 Winnipeg Blue Bombers final roster
Quarterbacks: 7 Alex Brink; 18 Justin Goltz; 4 Buck Pierce; Running backs: 33 Nick FitzGibbon; 19 Chris Garrett; 43 James Green; 39 Michel-Pierre Pontbriand; Receivers: 84 Greg Carr; 89 Clarence Denmark; 82 Terrence Edwards; 15 Aaron Hargreaves; 27 Kito Poblah; 81 Cory Watson	Offensive linemen: 59 Andre Douglas T; 64 Chris Greaves G/T; 69 Glenn January T; 60 Obby Khan C; 57 Brendon LaBatte G/C; 65 Steve Morley G; Defensive linemen: 97 Doug Brown DT; 45 Rodney Fritz DE; 56 Fernand Kashama DE; 93 Don Oramasionwu DT; 92 Bryant Turner DT; 98 Jason Vega DT/DE; 40 Odell Willis DE	Linebackers: 38 Marcellus Bowman; 46 Merrill Johnson; 41 Clint Kent; 47 Pierre-Luc Labbé; 10 Henoc Muamba; Defensive backs: 20 Deon Beasley; 25 Brady Browne; 23 Jonathan Hefney; 2 Jovon Johnson; 31 Ian Logan; 22 Darrell Pasco; 18 Johnny Sears; 21 Alex Suber	Special teams: 30 Jamie Boreham P/K; 50 Chris Cvetkovic LS; 17 Justin Palardy K; Reserve roster: 68 Kelly Butler T; 54 Kenny Mainor DE; 9 Mike Renaud P; 90 Dorian Smith DT; Practice roster: 86 Kurt Adams WR; 34 Dustin Doe LB; 80 Cassidy Doneff WR; 26 Bloi-Dei Dorzon RB; 51 Javon McKinnon LB; 94 Deji Oduwole DE; 66 Justin Sorensen C	Injured list: 16 Joey Elliott QB (9 Game); 88 Jade Etienne WR (1 Game); 29 Jerry-Ralph Jules DB (1 Game); 67 Chris Kowalczuk G (9 Game); 58 Joe Lobendahn MLB (9 Game); 32 Fred Reid RB (9 Game); 8 Brandon Stewart DB (1 Game); 3 Brandon Summers QB (1 Game); 55 Paul Swiston T (9 Game); 24 Carl Volny RB (9 Game); Italics indicate International player

== Coaching staff ==
2011 Winnipeg Blue Bombers staff
Front office: Owner – Community owned (non-profit corporation owned by members); Chairperson of the board of governors – Bill Watchorn; President/CEO – Jim Bell; Vice president and general manager of football operations – Joe Mack; Director of football operations – Ross Hodgkinson; Director of player personnel – Ken Moll; Head coaches: Head coach – Paul LaPolice; Assistant head coach – Richard Harris; Offensive coaches: Offensive coordinator and quarterbacks – Jamie Barresi; Receivers – Chris Wiesehan; Offensive line – Pat DelMonaco	Defensive coaches: Defensive coordinator – Tim Burke; Defensive line – Richard Harris; Linebackers – Casey Creehan; Defensive assistant – Markus Howell; Special teams coaches: Special teams coordinator – Kyle Walters; Special teams assistant – Markus Howell; → Coaching staff

== Player stats ==
=== Passing ===
Player	Att	Comp	%	Yards	TD	INT	Rating
Buck Pierce	411	261	63.5	3,348	14	18	82.0
Alex Brink	140	89	63.6	1,023	5	4	85.5
Joey Elliott	18	10	55.6	87	0	0	68.5
Justin Goltz	6	3	50.0	36	1	0	124.3

=== Rushing ===
Player	Att	Yards	Avg.	TD	Fumble
Fred Reid	181	759	4.2	4	1
Chris Garrett	92	576	6.3	4	0
Buck Pierce	51	324	6.4	2	1
Alex Brink	43	148	3.4	6	4
Clarence Denmark	7	81	11.6	0	1
Carl Volny	9	71	7.9	0	2

=== Receiving ===
Player	No.	Yards	Avg.	Long	TD
Terrence Edwards	66	1,124	17.0	63	8
Clarence Denmark	65	818	12.6	82	5
Cory Watson	69	793	11.5	92	1
Greg Carr	46	648	14.1	59	4
Terence Jeffers-Harris	29	347	12.0	84	2
Aaron Hargreaves	30	292	9.7	21	0

== Awards and records ==
- CFL's Most Outstanding Defensive Player Award – Jovon Johnson, CB

=== 2011 CFL All-Stars ===
- OG – Brendon LaBatte, CFL All-Star
- DE – Odell Willis, CFL All-Star
- CB – Jovon Johnson, CFL All-Star
- DB – Jonathan Hefney, CFL All-Star
- S – Ian Logan, CFL All-Star

=== Eastern All-Stars ===
- WR – Terrence Edwards, Eastern All-Star
- OT – Glenn January, Eastern All-Star
- OG – Brendon LaBatte, Eastern All-Star
- DT – Doug Brown, Eastern All-Star
- DE – Odell Willis, Eastern All-Star
- CB – Jovon Johnson, Eastern All-Star
- DB – Jonathan Hefney, Eastern All-Star
- S – Ian Logan, Eastern All-Star

== Playoffs ==
=== Schedule ===
Week	Game	Date	Time	Opponent	Score	Result	Attendance
20	Bye						
21	East Final	Nov 20	12:00 PM CST	vs. Hamilton Tiger-Cats	19–3	Win	30,051
22	Grey Cup	Nov 27	5:30 PM CST	at BC Lions	34–23	Loss	54,313

=== Bracket ===
November 13: Division Semi-Finals
East
E3	Hamilton Tiger-Cats	52*
E2	Montreal Alouettes	44
West
W3	Calgary Stampeders	19
W2	Edmonton Eskimos	33

November 20: Division Finals
E3	Hamilton Tiger-Cats	3
E1	Winnipeg Blue Bombers	19
W2	Edmonton Eskimos	23
W1	BC Lions	40

November 27: 99th Grey Cup; BC Place Stadium – Vancouver
E1	Winnipeg Blue Bombers	23
W1	BC Lions	34

*-Team won in Overtime.

=== East Final ===
Hamilton at Winnipeg

Team	1	2	3	4	Total
Tiger-Cats	3	0	0	0	3
• Blue Bombers	0	10	3	6	19

- Date: November 20
- Location: Canad Inns Stadium
  Winnipeg, MB
- Game start: 12:00 PM CST
- Game attendance: 30,051
- Game weather: Clear; −13 °C; wind 19 km/h S
- Referee: Andre Proulx
- TV announcers (TSN): Rod Black (Play by Play), Duane Forde (Colour), Sara Orlesky (Sideline)

=== Grey Cup ===
Winnipeg vs. BC

Team	1	2	3	4	Total
Blue Bombers	0	6	3	14	23
• Lions	11	3	10	10	34

- Date: November 27
- Location: BC Place Stadium
  Vancouver, BC
- Game start: 5:30 PM CST
- Game attendance: 54,313
- Game weather: none (closed dome)
- Referee: Andre Proulx
- TV announcers (TSN): Chris Cuthbert (Play by Play), Glen Suitor (Colour)
