= 2015 Winnipeg Blue Bombers season =

Canadian football team season

- General manager: Kyle Walters
- Head coach: Mike O'Shea
- Home stadium: Investors Group Field

Results
- Record: 5–13
- Division place: 4th, West
- Playoffs: did not qualify
- Team MOP: Jamaal Westerman
- Team MOC: Jamaal Westerman
- Team MOR: Khalil Bass

Uniform

The 2015 Winnipeg Blue Bombers season was the 58th season for the team in the Canadian Football League (CFL) and their 83rd overall. The Blue Bombers finished the season in fourth place in the West Division with a 5–13 record and missed the playoffs for the fourth year in a row, as well as the sixth time in seven seasons. This was also the first time since 2010 that a Grey Cup host city has failed to qualify for the playoffs.

== Offseason ==
=== CFL draft ===
The 2015 CFL draft took place on May 12, 2015. The Blue Bombers had six selections in the seven-round draft, including three of the first 15 picks. The team traded their third-round pick for Saskatchewan's second after sending Cory Watson and receiving Kris Bastien. The team also lost their seventh-round pick after trading for Josh Portis.

Round	Pick	Player	Position	School/Club team
1	2	Sukh Chungh	OL	Calgary
2	11	Addison Richards	WR	Regina
2	15	Brendan Morgan	DB	Queen's
4	33	Christophe Normand	RB	Laval
5	38	Ettore Lattanzio	DL	Ottawa
6	46	Justin Warden	LB	Bishop's

== Preseason ==
Week	Date	Kickoff	Opponent	Results		TV	Venue	Attendance	Summary
Week	Date	Kickoff	Opponent	Score	Record	TV	Venue	Attendance	Summary
A	Bye								
B	Tues, June 9	6:30 p.m. CDT	at Toronto Argonauts	W 34–27	1–0	None	Varsity Stadium	5,000	Recap
C	Fri, June 19	7:30 p.m. CDT	vs. Hamilton Tiger-Cats	L 15–26	1–1	None	Investors Group Field	24,344	Recap

== Regular season ==
=== Standings ===
West Division
Team	GP	W	L	PF	PA	Pts	
Edmonton Eskimos	18	14	4	466	341	28	Details
Calgary Stampeders	18	14	4	478	346	28	Details
BC Lions	18	7	11	437	486	14	Details
Winnipeg Blue Bombers	18	5	13	353	502	10	Details
Saskatchewan Roughriders	18	3	15	430	563	6	Details

=== Schedule ===
Week	Date	Kickoff	Opponent	Results		TV	Venue	Attendance	Summary
Week	Date	Kickoff	Opponent	Score	Record	TV	Venue	Attendance	Summary
1	Sat, June 27	7:00 p.m. CDT	at Saskatchewan Roughriders	W 30–26	1–0	TSN	Mosaic Stadium	32,228	Recap
2	Thur, July 2	7:30 p.m. CDT	vs. Hamilton Tiger-Cats	L 26–52	1–1	TSN/RDS2/ESPN2	Investors Group Field	27,279	Recap
3	Fri, July 10	6:00 p.m. CDT	vs. Montreal Alouettes	W 25–23	2–1	TSN/RDS/ESPN2	Investors Group Field	25,605	Recap
4	Sat, July 18	6:00 p.m. CDT	at Calgary Stampeders	L 25–26	2–2	TSN	McMahon Stadium	29,255	Recap
5	Sat, July 25	6:00 p.m. CDT	at Edmonton Eskimos	L 3–32	2–3	TSN	Commonwealth Stadium	27,895	Recap
6	Thur, July 30	7:30 p.m. CDT	vs. BC Lions	W 23–13	3–3	TSN/RDS/ESPN2	Investors Group Field	27,214	Recap
7	Sun, Aug 9	4:00 p.m. CDT	at Hamilton Tiger-Cats	L 8–38	3–4	TSN/RDS2/ESPNews	Tim Hortons Field	24,068	Recap
8	Fri, Aug 14	7:00 p.m. CDT	vs. Toronto Argonauts	L 20–27	3–5	TSN	Investors Group Field	27,246	Recap
9	Bye								
10	Sat, Aug 29	5:00 p.m. CDT	vs. Calgary Stampeders	L 8–36	3–6	TSN/RDS2	Investors Group Field	27,148	Recap
11	Sun, Sep 6	3:00 p.m. CDT	at Saskatchewan Roughriders	L 19–37	3–7	TSN	Mosaic Stadium	33,427	Recap
12	Sat, Sept 12	5:30 p.m. CDT	vs. Saskatchewan Roughriders	W 22–7	4–7	TSN/RDS2	Investors Group Field	35,156	Recap
13	Sun, Sept 20	12:00 p.m. CDT	at Montreal Alouettes	L 14–35	4–8	TSN/RDS	Molson Stadium	23,262	Recap
14	Fri, Sept 25	7:30 p.m. CDT	vs. Calgary Stampeders	L 23–25	4–9	TSN/RDS2	Investors Group Field	23,113	Recap
15	Sat, Oct 3	3:00 p.m. CDT	vs. Edmonton Eskimos	L 23–24	4–10	TSN	Investors Group Field	24,179	Recap
16	Sat, Oct 10	9:00 p.m. CDT	at BC Lions	W 29–26	5–10	TSN	BC Place	19,826	Recap
17	Fri, Oct 16	6:30 p.m. CDT	at Ottawa Redblacks	L 24–27	5–11	TSN/RDS2	TD Place Stadium	22,867	Recap
18	Sat, Oct 24	3:00 p.m. CDT	vs. Ottawa Redblacks	L 20–27	5–12	TSN/RDS2	Investors Group Field	23,773	Recap
19	Bye								
20	Fri, Nov 6	6:30 p.m. CST	at Toronto Argonauts	L 11–21	5–13	TSN/RDS2	Rogers Centre	17,511	Recap

== Roster ==
2015 Winnipeg Blue Bombers final roster
Quarterbacks: 12 Brian Brohm; 6 Dominique Davis; 15 Matt Nichols; Running backs: 32 Cameron Marshall; 37 Christophe Normand; 39 Michel-Pierre Pontbriand; Receivers: 4 Darvin Adams; 81 Kris Bastien; 88 Spencer Davis; 89 Clarence Denmark; 87 Rory Kohlert; 17 Nick Moore; 82 Evan Pszczonak	Offensive linemen: 66 Stanley Bryant T; 58 Selvish Capers G/T; 69 Sukh Chungh G; 61 Matthias Goossen G/C; 54 Tommy Griffiths G/C; 53 Patrick Neufeld T/G; Defensive linemen: 93 Justin Cole DE; 94 Ethan Farmer DT; 99 Jamarkus McFarland DT; 52 Louie Richardson DE; 95 Jake Thomas DT; 49 Chase Vaughn DE; 55 Jamaal Westerman DE	Linebackers: 47 Khalil Bass; 40 Jesse Briggs; 26 Tony Burnett; 10 Sam Hurl; 22 Garrett Waggoner; 38 Ian Wild; Defensive backs: 20 Johnny Adams; 2 Matt Bucknor; 25 Bruce Johnson; 41 Derek Jones; 31 Maurice Leggett; 21 Brendan Morgan; 29 Julian Posey; 14 Lin-J Shell; 27 Teague Sherman	Special teams: 33 Sergio Castillo K/P; 70 Lirim Hajrullahu P/K; 46 Chad Rempel LS; Reserve roster: 44 Zach Anderson DT; 36 Tim Cronk FB; Practice roster: 97 Ivan Brown DE; 60 Cameron Jefferson T; 62 Sam Longo G; 64 Cole Manhart G; 30 C. J. Roberts DB; 14 Aaron Woods SB	Injured list: 98 Nate Collins DT; 84 Kevin Cone WR; 34 Paris Cotton RB; 59 Jace Daniels T; 83 Julian Feoli-Gudino WR; 9 Thaddeus Gibson DE; 56 Derrell Johnson DE; 96 Leon Mackey DT; 16 Robert Marve QB; 3 Graig Newman DB; 90 Greg Peach DE; 68 Dominic Picard C; 8 Chris Randle DB; 86 Addison Richards WR; 23 Da'Rel Scott RB; 1 Troy Stoudermire WR/DB; 92 Bryant Turner DT; 57 Devin Tyler T; 19 Justin Veltung SB; 35 Chevon Walker RB; 7 Demond Washington DB; 5 Drew Willy QB; Italics indicate International player

== Coaching staff ==
2015 Winnipeg Blue Bombers staff
Front office: Owner – Community owned (non-profit corporation owned by members); Chairperson of the board of governors – Brock Bulbuck; President/CEO – Wade Miller; General manager of football operations – Kyle Walters; Assistant General Manager / Director of U.S. Scouting – Danny McManus; Assistant general manager / director of player personnel – Ted Goveia; National Scout - Drew Morris; Director of Football Operations - Dave Siddall; Assistant Director of Football Operations - Maddie Norwell; Head Equipment Manager - Brad Fotty; Assistant Equipment Manager - Kevin Todd; Assistant Equipment Manager - Jared Cronk; Video coordinator – Kent Anderson; Assistant video coordinator – Colin Thurston; Head coaches: Head coach – Mike O'Shea; Offensive coaches: Offensive coordinator – Marcel Bellefeuille; Quarterbacks – Gene Dahlquist; Wide receivers – Markus Howell; Running backs – Buck Pierce; Offensive line – Bob Wylie; Assistant offensive line – Paul Charbonneau	Defensive coaches: Defensive coordinator – Richie Hall; Linebackers – Greg Knox; Defensive line – Todd Howard; Defensive backs – Barron Miles; Special teams coaches: Special teams coordinator – Mike O'Shea; → Coaching staff
