= Khalif Mitchell =

American gridiron football player (born 1985)

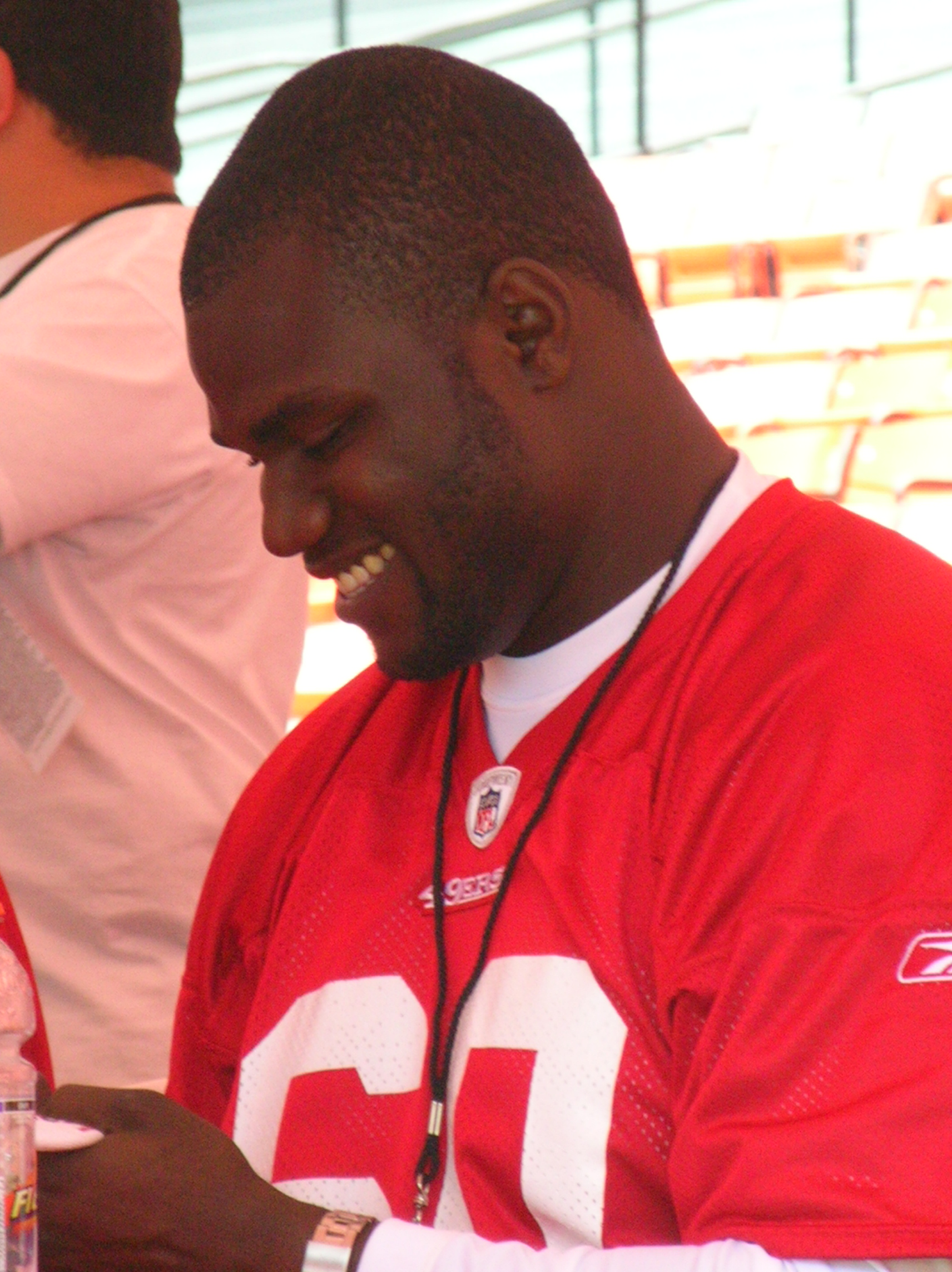
- Mitchell at the San Francisco 49ers Family Day 2009

No. 60, 96
- Position: Defensive tackle

Personal information
- Born: April 7, 1985 (age 41); Virginia Beach, Virginia, U.S.
- Listed height: 6 ft 5 in (1.96 m)
- Listed weight: 316 lb (143 kg)

Career information
- College: University of North Carolina (2005); East Carolina (2006–2008)

Career history
- 2009–2010: San Francisco 49ers*
- 2010–2012: BC Lions
- 2013: Toronto Argonauts
- 2014: BC Lions
- 2015: Montreal Alouettes*
- 2016: Saskatchewan Roughriders*
- 2017: Sioux Falls Storm
- * Offseason or practice squad member only

Awards and highlights
- Grey Cup champion (2011); 2× CFL All-Star (2011, 2013); CFL East All-Star (2013); CFL West All-Star (2011)
- Stats at Pro Football Reference
- Stats at CFL.ca

Khalif Quadree Mitchell (born April 7, 1985) is an American former professional football defensive tackle. Mitchell played college football for two seasons at the University of North Carolina and later at East Carolina University. He was signed by the San Francisco 49ers as an undrafted free agent in 2009 and released in 2010. In 2011, he won a Grey Cup with the BC Lions. In his professional career, Mitchell was a member of the Lions, Toronto Argonauts, Montreal Alouettes and the Saskatchewan Roughriders in the CFL, San Francisco 49ers in the NFL and the Sioux Falls Storm in the IFL.

== Early life ==
A Virginia state native, Mitchell played 1 season of football in 2004 while attending Hargrave Military Academy before transferring to Chapel Hill High School.

== College career ==
Mitchell played his first two seasons of college football as a defensive tackle with the Tarheels team for the University of North Carolina. As an occasional starter, Mitchell recorded 28 tackles, 15 of these were made during the 2005 season.

After his sophomore season at North Carolina, Mitchell transferred to East Carolina University before the start of the 2006 season in which he did not play. His junior season in 2007 included 11 games played that led Mitchell to earning All-Conference USA honors and helping the ECU Pirates football team to victory in the Sheraton Hawai'i Bowl. Upon sustaining injuries to his back and foot, Mitchell saw limited gameplay during the 2008 season.

Approaching the 2009 NFL draft, experts conversely described Mitchell as possessing "a terrific combination of size, speed and strength" but "does not use any of his tools particularly well." Mitchell was also predicted as a 7th round draft pick. By his senior year in 2009 however, it was reported on May 1 that Mitchell signed an undrafted free agent contract with the San Francisco 49ers.

== Professional career ==
=== San Francisco 49ers ===
After going undrafted in the 2009 NFL draft, Mitchell was signed by the San Francisco 49ers as an undrafted free agent on May 1, 2009. He was waived on September 5, and subsequently signed to the practice squad on September 6. He was released from the practice squad on September 8 and later re-signed to the practice squad on October 13. He was released in early September 2010.

=== BC Lions (first stint) ===
Mitchell was signed by the BC Lions of the Canadian Football League on September 21, 2010. He was added to the team's 46-man playing roster as a nose tackle, and activated to the team's 42-man game day roster against the Calgary Stampeders for September 25. With limited playing time in the 2010 CFL season Mitchell only recorded 6 tackles. In Mitchell's second year in the league he earned 2011 CFL All-Star honors with 33 tackles and 6 sacks. In 2011, he won the 99th Grey Cup while playing for the Lions. He re-signed with the BC Lions on January 16, 2012.

Mitchell was suspended by the CFL on July 23, 2012, for two games without pay after he violently hyperextended the arm of Edmonton Eskimos offensive lineman Simeon Rottier. After another game, the league also fined him an unspecified amount for making a number of throat-slashing gestures.

Mitchell caused a controversy for what were understood as racist remarks offensive to people of Chinese descent that he made on Twitter regarding the 2012 US Presidential election debate between Mitt Romney and Barack Obama. Michell was suspended for one game for his remarks, and fined an undisclosed amount of money. His problems started when he tweeted "My teammate said who I think Won the debate. I said the American Ppl. Cause if they watched carefully BOTH OF THEM Hide Money with the Chinks". He later claimed "So I Never knew "Chink" was racist. I def. meant no harm. I was referring to Obama & Romney putting their personal trust in Chinese Banks."

=== Toronto Argonauts ===
On April 2, 2013, the BC Lions traded Mitchell to the Toronto Argonauts for defensive end Adrian Awasom and the rights to an unnamed negotiation list player. Not long after the trade Mitchell began voicing his displeasure with being traded to Toronto. He announced that he would not be attending the Argonauts training camp scheduled to begin on June 1, 2013. Mitchell wanted to be traded to Calgary or Edmonton, or have the trade between the Lions and Argos reversed and have the Lions release him. His future with the Argos was surrounded in uncertainty.

Mitchell changed his mind and was present for mandatory training camp at the start of June 2013. TSN sports reporter Farhan Lalji reported that Mitchell agreed to play the 2013 season with the Argos, under the condition that he be released following the season to pursue employment in the NFL.

Mitchell for the season played in 16 games, recording 32 tackles, five sacks (team high for the season) and one fumble recovery. He was named a CFL East All-Star and a CFL All-Star. On March 10, 2014, Mitchell was released by the Argos.

=== BC Lions (second stint) ===
Despite rumors Mitchell would sign with an NFL franchise for the 2014 season, Mitchell signed a contract with the Lions on May 6, 2014. Mitchell did not have a significant impact on the Lions defense during the 2014 season. He finished the season with only 9 tackles and 1 sack. Following the season he was not re-signed by the Lions, and became a free-agent on February 10, 2015.

=== Montreal Alouettes ===
On February 18, 2015, Mitchell signed a 3-year contract with the Montreal Alouettes of the Canadian Football League. He was, however, released before the regular season began in 2015 for tweeting a Holocaust denial video and failing to remove the posts from his Twitter page.

=== Saskatchewan Roughriders ===
On August 31, 2016, midway through the 2016 CFL season Mitchell signed with the Saskatchewan Roughriders as a practice squad member. On September 12, he was released from the team due to "being unfit". After having made additional outspoken remarks about the Jewish community, Khalif Mitchell was advised he had little leeway for expressing what he described as an opinion and that any additional remarks that garnish negative attention would result in his immediate dismissal.

=== Sioux Falls Storm ===
On February 7, 2017, Mitchell signed with the Sioux Falls Storm of the Indoor Football League as a starting defensive lineman. As of June 2017, he is currently leading the team in sacks and tackles and is 7th in the entire league. Mitchell and the Storm lost the United Bowl against the Arizona Rattlers on July 7, 2017.
