= Chris Garrett (Canadian football) =

American gridiron football player (born 1987)

Profile
- Position: Running back

Personal information
- Born: February 11, 1987 (age 39); New York, New York
- Listed height: 5 ft 8 in (1.73 m)
- Listed weight: 185 lb (84 kg)

Career information
- College: Ohio University

Career history
- 2010–2013: Winnipeg Blue Bombers
- 2013: Saskatchewan Roughriders

Awards and highlights
- First-team All-MAC (2009)
- Stats at CFL.ca (archive)

Chris Garrett (born February 11, 1987, in New York, New York) is a former running back who played for the Winnipeg Blue Bombers of the Canadian Football League from 2010 to 2013. Garrett grew up in Utica, New York before playing college football at Ohio University.

== Career ==
Pre-draft measurables
Height	Weight	40-yard dash	10-yard split	20-yard split	20-yard shuttle	Three-cone drill	Vertical jump	Broad jump	Bench press
5 ft 6 3/8 in (1.69 m)	185 lb (84 kg)	4.50 s	1.55 s	2.59 s	4.26 s	6.85 s	34.0 in (0.86 m)	9 ft 5 in (2.87 m)	19 reps
All values from Pro Day

In his first season with starting reps for the Bombers in 2011, Garrett cemented the starting role as a third stringer. He gained the spot after starters Fred Reid and backup Carl Volny went down with injury in the same game. Garrett then helped the team to the 99th Grey Cup with a 190-yard performance in the CFL East final against the Hamilton Tiger-Cats. He dedicated the game ball to former teammate Marcellis Williamson in an emotional tribute after the game, also promising to send the ball to Williamson's family. Garrett was then named the offensive player of the week by the CFL, for his playoff performance against the Tiger-Cats.

Garrett missed the entire 2012 CFL season after injuring his injured his Achilles in training camp. Upon recovery during the following season, he was released by the Bombers on August 14, 2013.

On September 4, 2013, the Saskatchewan Roughriders signed Garrett. He was released during the off season.

== Statistics ==
Rushing		Regular season						Receiving
Year	Team	No.	Yards	Avg	Long	TD	Fumbles	No.	Yards	Avg	Long	TD
2010	WPG	19	113	5.9	23	0	0	1	20	20	20	0
2011	WPG	92	576	6.3	32	4	0	20	91	4.6	15	0
Totals	TOT	111	689	6.2	32	4	0	21	111	5.3	20	0

Rushing		Playoffs							Receiving
Year	Team	GP	No.	Yards	Avg	Long	TD	Fumbles	No.	Yards	Avg	Long	TD
2011	WPG	1	29	190	6.5	25	1	1	1	10	10.0	10	0
Totals	TOT	1	29	190	6.5	25	1	1	1	10	10.0	10	0
