= Ian Logan =

Canadian football player (born 1982)

Profile
- Position: Safety

Personal information
- Born: August 19, 1982 (age 44); Waterloo, Ontario, Canada
- Listed height: 5 ft 9 in (1.75 m)
- Listed weight: 190 lb (86 kg)

Career information
- University: Wilfrid Laurier

Career history
- 2006–2012: Winnipeg Blue Bombers

Awards and highlights
- CFL All-Star (2011); CFL East All-Star (2011); 3× OUA All-Star (2003–2005); 2× CIS First All-Canadian Team (2004–2005)
- Stats at CFL.ca (archive)

Ian Logan (born August 19, 1982) is a Canadian former professional football safety who played for the Winnipeg Blue Bombers in the Canadian Football League (CFL). He was signed by the Blue Bombers as an undrafted free agent in 2005. He played CIS football at Wilfrid Laurier.

== College career ==
Logan played for the Wilfrid Laurier Golden Hawks. He was an Ontario University Athletics All-Star for three straight seasons (2003 through 2005) and was named to the CIS First All-Canadian Team in 2004 and 2005.

== Professional career ==
The 2006 season saw Logan appearing in 14 regular season games for the Blue & Gold. He made his CFL debut in the team’s regular season opener versus the Montreal Alouettes. He finished the regular season with one defensive tackle and five special teams tackles. He also dressed for the team’s Eastern Semifinal Championship loss to the Toronto Argonauts at Rogers Centre.

Logan blossomed in his second season during 2007. He dressed for 15 regular season games including four starts at corner. He finished the regular season with 16 defensive tackles, three special teams tackles, two pass knockdowns and two interception returns for 16 yards. His two INTs ranked second among Bomber defenders.

For the 2008 season, Logan won the starting spot at safety after week 7. He then went on to start the next 11 regular season games he dressed for. He also started at safety for the East semi-final versus Edmonton. He finished the campaign with 38 defensive tackles, 19 special teams tackles—second most on the team—, two sacks, and a tackle for loss.

The 2009 season was Logan’s first full season as a CFL starter and he did not disappoint. Logan started 16 games at safety for the Blue and Gold (missed week eight and nine). He finished with 44 defensive tackles, four interceptions and also chipped in on special teams, making 13 tackles on that unit. He made seven tackles on July 19, 2009 at Hamilton (25–13 L).

Logan was part of the self-titled "Swaggerville" defence that led the Bombers to their first division win during the 2011 Winnipeg Blue Bombers season. That year he was named to the east division all-star team for the first time and his first ever CFL All-Star team a short time later. When asked what the award meant Logan said that "I was undrafted, so it's a great story going from undrafted to a CFL all-star."

Logan was released by the Blue Bombers on March 26, 2013. He announced his retirement on May 27, 2013.

=== Statistics ===
Regular season		Tackles			Interceptions				Fumbles
Year	Team	Tackles	Stt	Sacks	Int	Yards	Long	TD	Fumbles	Yards	Long	TD
2006	WPG	1	5	0	0	0	0	0	0	0	0	0
2007	WPG	16	3	0	2	0	13	0	0	0	0	0
2008	WPG	38	19	2	0	0	0	0	0	0	0	0
2009	WPG	44	12	0	4	0	6	0	0	0	0	0
2010	WPG	45	5	1	1	0	16	0	0	0	0	0
2011	WPG	34	3	0	4	0	17	0	1	0	0	0
2012	WPG	46	1	1	1	0	0	0	0	0	0	0
CFL totals		224	48	4	12	0	17	0	1	0	0	0
