= Bryant Turner Jr. =

American gridiron football player (born 1987)

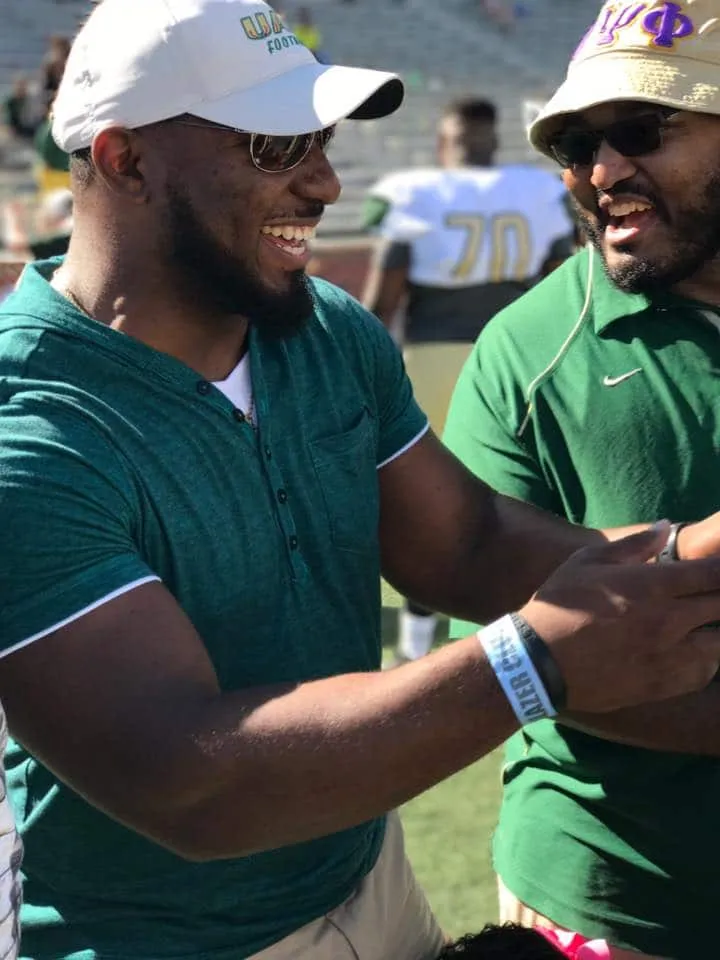
- Bryant Turner Jr. (Left)

No. 92
- Position: Defensive lineman

Personal information
- Born: November 25, 1987 (age 38); Mobile, Alabama, U.S.
- Listed height: 6 ft 2 in (1.88 m)
- Listed weight: 279 lb (127 kg)

Career information
- High school: Daphne (Daphne, Alabama)
- College: UAB
- NFL draft: 2011: undrafted

Career history
- Winnipeg Blue Bombers (2011–2015); BC Lions (2016–2017); Calgary Stampeders (2018)*; Winnipeg Blue Bombers (2018)
- * Offseason or practice squad member only

Awards and highlights
- CFL All-Star (2012); CFL East All-Star (2012, 2013)

Career CFL statistics
- Total tackles: 97
- Sacks: 30
- Forced fumbles: 5
- Stats at CFL.ca

Bryant Turner Jr. (born November 25, 1987) is an American former professional football defensive lineman. He made his professional debut with the Winnipeg Blue Bombers in 2011. He played college football at UAB.

== Professional career ==
=== Winnipeg Blue Bombers ===
Bryant Turner signed with Winnipeg on May 9, 2011. On December 19, 2013, the Blue Bombers added two years to Turner's contract, extending his contract through the 2016 season. Following five seasons with the Bombers Turner was released by Winnipeg on March 22, 2016.

=== BC Lions ===
On April 6, 2016, Bryant Turner signed a one-year contract with the BC Lions of the Canadian Football League.

== Statistics ==
		Defence
Year	Team	Games	Tackles	ST	Sacks	Int	TD	FF
2011	WPG	13	13	0	3	0	0	1
2012	WPG	14	15	0	6	0	0	2
2013	WPG	16	12	0	7	0	0	2
2014	WPG	16	23	0	6	0	0	0
2015	WPG	12	12	0	4	0	0	0
2016	BC	10	25	0	3	0	0	0
2017	BC	9	7	0	1	0	0	0
CFL totals		90	97	0	30	0	0	5
