= Joey Elliott =

American football player (born 1986)

Indianapolis Colts
- Title: Assistant director of pro scouting

Personal information
- Born: August 2, 1986 (age 40); Evansville, Indiana, U.S.
- Listed height: 6 ft 2 in (1.88 m)
- Listed weight: 216 lb (98 kg)

Career information
- Position: Quarterback (No. 16, 14, 18)
- High school: Harrison (Evansville)
- College: Purdue
- NFL draft: 2010: undrafted

Career history

Playing
- Philadelphia Eagles (2010)*; Winnipeg Blue Bombers (2010–2012); BC Lions (2013); Ottawa Redblacks (2014)
- * Offseason or practice squad member only

Operations
- Indianapolis Colts (2016–2024) Pro scout; Indianapolis Colts (2024–present) Assistant director of pro scouting

Career CFL statistics
- Completions: 217
- Attempts: 374
- Yards: 2,634
- Touchdowns: 7
- Interceptions: 15
- Stats at CFL.ca (archived)

Joseph Preston Elliott (born August 2, 1986) is an American former professional football player who was a quarterback in the Canadian Football League (CFL). He is the assistant director of pro scouting for the Indianapolis Colts of the National Football League (NFL). He played college football for the Purdue Boilermakers. Elliott was signed by the Philadelphia Eagles of the NFL as an undrafted free agent in 2010. He played in the CFL for the Winnipeg Blue Bombers, BC Lions, and Ottawa Redblacks.

== Early life ==
College recruiting
Name	Hometown	School	Height	Weight	40^{‡}	Commit date
Joey Elliott; QB	Evansville, Indiana	Harrison High School	6 ft 3 in (1.91 m)	190 lb (86 kg)	4.63	Jul 2, 2004
Joey Elliott; QB	Recruit ratings: Scout: Rivals:					
Overall recruit ranking: Scout: 21 (QB) Rivals: 18 (QB), 5 (IN)
‡ Refers to 40-yard dash; Note: In many cases, Scout, Rivals, 247Sports, On3, and ESPN may conflict in their listings of height, weight and 40 time.; In these cases, the average was taken. ESPN grades are on a 100-point scale.; Sources: "2005 Team Ranking". Rivals.com.

Elliott committed to Purdue University on July 2, 2004. Elliott also received FBS scholarship offers from Indiana and Washington State.

== College career ==
Elliott played college football for the Purdue Boilermakers. He was named co-captain for the 2009 season. He was a 3-time Academic All-Big Ten and was a member of the 2007 Motor City Bowl-winning team over Central Michigan.

== Professional career ==
=== Philadelphia Eagles ===
Elliott was signed by the Philadelphia Eagles as an undrafted free agent on April 26, 2010. He was waived on June 10.

=== Winnipeg Blue Bombers ===
Elliott was signed by the Winnipeg Blue Bombers on July 20, 2010. On October 23, 2010, Elliott saw his first game action after starting quarterback Buck Pierce was injured the prior game, and second-string Steven Jyles, and third-string quarterbacks Alex Brink were knocked out the game due to shoulder injuries . He started the last two games of the season for the Blue Bombers, both losses.

He began the 2011 season as the second-string quarterback, but suffered a season-ending injury in the third game of the season.

In August 2012, Elliot was named the Blue Bombers starting quarterback. In his first start on Aug. 16, the Bombers defeated the Hamilton Tiger-Cats by a score of 32–25. He completed 33 of 43 passes for 406 yards and a touchdown, becoming the first Blue Bomber quarterback to throw for over 400 yards since 2009, and was named the CFL's Offensive Player of the Week twice.

Elliott was released by the Blue Bombers on March 26, 2013.

=== BC Lions ===
On May 24, 2013, Elliott was signed by the BC Lions as one of their quarterbacks. He was released on September 5, 2013, having not played in any regular season game with the Lions, but was re-signed on September 18, 2013.

=== Ottawa Redblacks ===
On September 1, 2014, Elliott was signed by the Ottawa Redblacks after their backup Thomas DeMarco was injured for the rest of the 2014 season.

== Career statistics ==
=== CFL ===
			Passing										Rushing			
Year	Team	Games	Started	Att	Comp	Pct	Yards	TD	Int	Rating	Att	Yards	Avg	Long	TD	Fumb
2010	WPG	13	2	73	35	47.9	435	2	3	59.9	9	66	7.3	33	0	0
2011	WPG	3	0	18	10	55.6	87	0	0	68.5	2	8	4.0	4	0	0
2012	WPG	17	7	280	170	60.7	2101	5	12	72.0	19	134	7.1	23	1	1
2013	BC	15	0	2	1	50.0	0	0	0	56.3	0	0	0.0	0	0	0
2014	OTT	8	0	0	0	0.0	0	0	0	0.0	0	0	0.0	0	0	0
CFL totals		56	9	374	217	58.0	2634	7	15	69.3	30	208	6.9	30	1	1

=== College ===
Elliott's statistics are as follows:

			Passing							Rushing		
Season	Team	GP	Rating	Att	Comp	Pct	Yds	TD	INT	Att	Yds	TD
2006	Purdue	3	133.5	10	6	60.0	72	1	1	3	9	0
2007	Purdue	4	111.1	24	13	54.2	147	1	1	2	5	0
2008	Purdue	3	98.7	15	8	53.3	81	0	0	7	13	1
2009	Purdue	12	131.1	433	267	61.7	3,026	22	13	87	268	4
	Totals	22	129.2	482	294	61.0	3,326	24	15	99	295	5

== Executive career ==
Elliott was hired by the Indianapolis Colts as a pro scout in May 2016. He was promoted to assistant director of pro scouting in 2024.

== Personal life ==
Elliot began a quarterback training camp in 2012.
