= Dan West (Canadian football) =

Canadian football player (born 1986)

No. 33
- Position: Safety

Personal information
- Born: September 3, 1986 (age 40); Ajax, Ontario, Canada
- Listed height: 6 ft 2 in (1.88 m)
- Listed weight: 205 lb (93 kg)

Career information
- High school: multiple schools
- University: Bishop's
- CFL draft: 2012: undrafted

Career history
- 2012–2014: Winnipeg Blue Bombers
- 2015: Saskatchewan Roughriders
- 2016–2018: Ottawa Redblacks

Awards and highlights
- Grey Cup champion (2016)
- Stats at CFL.ca

Dan West (born September 3, 1986) is a Canadian former professional football defensive back. He was initially signed as an undrafted free agent by the Winnipeg Blue Bombers on May 11, 2012, and played for three seasons for the team. After being released by the Blue Bombers during their 2015 training camp, he was signed by the Saskatchewan Roughriders on July 15, 2015. On June 13, 2016, the Roughriders released West, but he was signed by the Redblacks on June 21, 2016. He earned his first Grey Cup Championship ring in 2016 when the Redblacks beat the Calgary Stampeders in overtime.

He played CIS football for the Bishop's Gaiters.

West started out playing tyke football for the Ajax/Pickering Dolphins at the age of 6.
