= Brandon Whitaker =

American gridiron football player (born 1985)

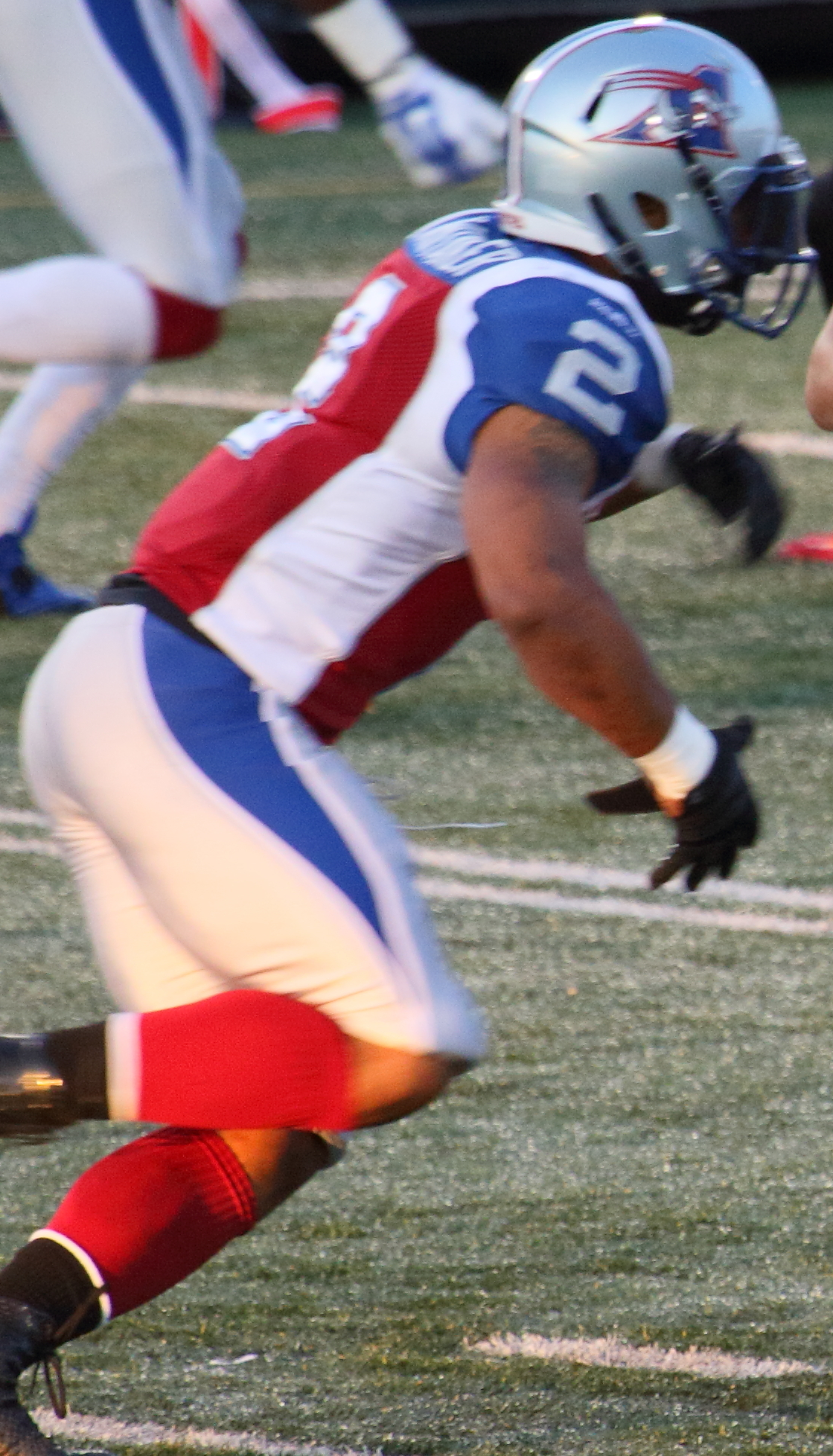
- Whitaker with the Montreal Alouettes in 2013

No. 3
- Position: Running back

Personal information
- Born: September 7, 1985 (age 41); Edmond, Oklahoma, U.S.
- Listed height: 5 ft 10 in (1.78 m)
- Listed weight: 196 lb (89 kg)

Career information
- College: Baylor
- NFL draft: 2008: undrafted

Career history
- 2008–2014: Montreal Alouettes
- 2015–2017: Toronto Argonauts

Awards and highlights
- 3× Grey Cup champion (2009, 2010, 2017); CFL All-Star (2011); 4× CFL East All-Star (2011, 2014–2016)
- Stats at CFL.ca

Brandon Marcel Whitaker (born September 7, 1985) is an American former professional football running back who played for the Montreal Alouettes and Toronto Argonauts of the Canadian Football League (CFL). He was signed as an undrafted free agent by the Alouettes in 2008. He played college football for the Baylor Bears, where he majored in communications. Whitaker is a three-time Grey Cup champion, winning back-to-back championships in 2009 and 2010 with the Alouettes, as well as the 105th Grey Cup with the Argonauts under the leadership of former Alouettes' coach Marc Trestman.The Argonauts did not extend Whitaker's contract with the team subsequent to the 2017 CFL season.

== Professional career ==
=== Montreal Alouettes ===
After going undrafted in the 2008 NFL draft, Whitaker signed with the Montreal Alouettes of the Canadian Football League (CFL) in early June 2008. He was released by the Alouettes on June 22 before the start of the 2008 CFL season. On September 11, 2008, it was reported that Whitaker had been signed to Montreal's practice roster. In his first two seasons in the league Whitaker was used a rotational back. In 2011, he took over the starting role from Avon Cobourne, and he made an immediate impact. Whitaker led the CFL in rushing with 1,381 yards on 226 carries. He also added 638 receiving yards to surpass 2,000 yards from scrimmage and had six-100 yard rushing games. Whitaker tore his ACL in September of the 2012 season, resulting in missing almost half the regular season. Following the season Whitaker's contract expired and he attempted to sign with an NFL team, but eventually signed a new 3-year deal with the Alouettes in early June. Early in the 2013 CFL season Whitaker suffered another injury, this time a separated shoulder, which resulted in him missing 13 of the 18 regular season games. Whitaker played in the first 13 games of the 2014 season before landing on the 6-game injured list with a foot injury to wrap up the season. Prior to the injury he managed to cross 1,000 yards from scrimmage for the third time in his career; earning an East Division all-star award.

=== Toronto Argonauts ===
On June 21, 2015, Whitaker signed with division rivals the Toronto Argonauts. In his first season in Toronto Whitaker was the Argos lead running back, carrying the ball 121 times for 636 yards, while also contributing 53 receptions for 444 yards in the passing game. His efforts resulted in him being named an East Division all-star for the second consecutive season.

In his second season with the Argos Whitaker was named an East Division all-star again after racking up 1,009 yards and three touchdowns on 189 carries, becoming the 41st player in CFL history to rush for 5,000 career yards in the process. Following the season he was no re-signed and became a free agent on February 14, 2017. Nevertheless, Whitaker and the Argos agreed to a new contract on March 30, 2017. Whittaker began the season as Toronto's starting running back, but was placed on the six-game injured list on July 4, 2017. Despite finishing the year on the injured list, and watching the rise of teammate James Wilder Jr., the CFL's Most Outstanding Rookie Award winner, Whitaker would still be a part of the championship team of 2017, which was Whitaker's third Grey Cup. His contract with the Argonauts expired February 14, 2018 at noon. The contract was not extended nor was he offered a new contract after Free Agency begun. Under the salary cap system and the restructuring of James Wilder Jr.'s contract in March 2018, the Argonauts were likely unable to extend an offer to Whittaker.

== Personal life ==
He is the son of Denise Hill and Aaron Whitaker.

Whitaker appeared on the CBC program Hello Goodbye while awaiting for his is mother to arrive at the Pearson airport.
