= Keron Williams =

Jamaican gridiron football player (born 1984)

No. 9
- Position: Defensive end

Personal information
- Born: September 3, 1984 (age 42); Manchester, Jamaica
- Listed height: 6 ft 1 in (1.85 m)
- Listed weight: 260 lb (118 kg)

Career information
- High school: Palm Beach Gardens
- College: Massachusetts

Career history
- 2006–2007: Calgary Stampeders
- 2008–2009: Montreal Alouettes
- 2010–2013: BC Lions

Awards and highlights
- 2× Grey Cup champion (2009, 2011); 2× CFL All-Star (2009, 2012); CFL East All-Star (2008, 2009); CFL West All-Star (2011, 2012); CFLPA Pro Player All-Star (2008)
- Stats at CFL.ca

Keron Donavan Williams (born September 3, 1984) is a Jamaican former professional Canadian football defensive tackle who played in the Canadian Football League (CFL). He was originally signed by the Calgary Stampeders in 2006. Williams played college football for the UMass Minutemen.

== Professional career ==
Williams was signed by the Calgary Stampeders in 2006 and made his professional debut at defensive tackle against the Lions on October 15, 2006. Following two seasons with the Stampeders, he signed as a free agent with the Montreal Alouettes where he won his first Grey Cup championship in 2009. After his championship-winning season, Williams signed with the BC Lions as a free agent on February 16, 2010 and switched to playing defensive end. He won his second Grey Cup championship as a member of the Lions in 2011 after BC won the 99th Grey Cup while beginning the season 0-5. Williams finished the 2012 CFL season as the league leader in sacks with 12, which was also a career high.

== Personal info ==
Williams spends his offseason in Apopka, Florida with his wife, Lexi (Hasti) and their daughter Jazmyne, where he works as a graphic designer. He is the son of Ivanah Thomas.
