= William Henry Harrison High School (Evansville, Indiana) =

Location
- 211 Fielding Road; Evansville, Indiana 47715; United States; 37°58′25″N 87°29′10″W

Information
- Type: Public high school
- Established: 1962
- School district: Evansville Vanderburgh School Corporation
- Principal: Tamara Skinner
- Faculty: 79.84 (on an FTE basis)
- Grades: 9–12
- Enrollment: 1,209 (2023–24)
- Student to teacher ratio: 15.14
- Campus: Mid-size city
- Colors: Red, black and white
- Athletics conference: Southern Indiana Athletic Conference
- Nickname: Warriors
- Rival: Bosse High School
- Newspaper: The Prophet
- Website: Evansville Harrison High School

William Henry Harrison High School, also known as Evansville Harrison High School, is a public high school on the east side of Evansville, Indiana. Students at Harrison come from the Plaza Park Middle School and McGary Middle School.

Harrison High School opened in September, 1962. The school was named for William Henry Harrison, the ninth President of the United States.

== Sports ==
Marching Band Also see: Sports in Evansville

=== State titles ===
- Girls' golf (1988–89)
- Boys' golf (2011–12)

== Notable alumni ==
- Sean Bennett, NFL football player
- Brad Brownell, Clemson University men's basketball head coach
- Calbert Cheaney, NBA basketball player and coach
- Joey Elliott, quarterback for Purdue Boilermakers football and CFL's Winnipeg Blue Bombers, BC Lions and Ottawa RedBlacks
- Brad Ellsworth, former U.S. Representative from Indiana's 8th congressional district
- Kevin Hardy, former Illinois Fighting Illini football player and NFL Pro Bowl linebacker for Jacksonville Jaguars, Dallas Cowboys and Cincinnati Bengals
- Barbara Kinney, White House photographer, Clinton Administration
- Chris Lowery, former Southern Illinois Salukis men's basketball head coach; assistant coach of Kansas State Wildcats men's basketball team
- Walter McCarty, former Kentucky Wildcats men's basketball player and for NBA's New York Knicks, Boston Celtics, Phoenix Suns and Los Angeles Clippers; assistant coach for Boston Celtics. Former Head Coach of University of Evansville Men's Basketball team.
- David Ragland, former Missouri Southern Lions and Southern Indiana Screaming Eagles men's basketball player. Current Evansville Purple Aces men's basketball head coach.
- Steven Sater, Tony Award-winning poet and playwright
- Randall Shepard, Chief Justice Indiana State Supreme Court
- Jami Stallings, 2003 Miss Indiana Teen USA, 2007 Miss Indiana USA
- Casey Stegall, correspondent for Fox News
- Scott Studwell, NFL football player
- Andy Timmons, guitarist
- Brandon Gaudin, sports broadcaster. Voice of Madden NFL. Broadcaster for Fox Sports, Westwood One and Big Ten Network

== See also ==
- List of high schools in Indiana
