= Josh Bourke =

Canadian gridiron football player (born 1982)

Profile
- Position: Offensive tackle

Personal information
- Born: October 16, 1982 (age 44); Windsor, Ontario, Canada
- Listed height: 6 ft 7 in (2.01 m)
- Listed weight: 315 lb (143 kg)

Career information
- High school: St. Mary's Preparatory (Orchard Lake Village, Michigan)
- College: Grand Valley State
- CFL draft: 2004: 3rd round, 21st overall pick

Career history
- 2006: Green Bay Packers
- 2007–2015: Montreal Alouettes
- 2016: Toronto Argonauts

Awards and highlights
- 2× Grey Cup champion (2009, 2010); 2× Leo Dandurand Trophy (2011, 2012); 2× CFL All-Star (2011, 2012); 7× CFL East All-Star (2008–2014)
- Stats at CFL.ca (archive)
- Canadian Football Hall of Fame (Class of 2023)

Joshua Nathan Bourke (born October 16, 1982) is a Canadian former professional football offensive lineman. He spent the majority of his professional career with the Montreal Alouettes of the Canadian Football League (CFL). He also spent time with the Toronto Argonauts (CFL) and the Green Bay Packers (NFL).

== Early life ==
Bourke attended St. Mary's Preparatory in Orchard Lake, Michigan, and went on to Grand Valley State University where he graduated with a Bachelors in Business Administration. From 2000 to 2005 he played on the Grand Valley State Lakers football team. In 2005 he was named GLIAC Offensive Lineman of the Year and a First-Team All-GLIAC.

== Professional career ==
=== Green Bay Packers ===
Bourke signed with the Green Bay Packers of the National Football League in May 2006. He was released on June 8, 2007, without playing in a regular season game.

=== Montreal Alouettes ===
Bourke was chosen by the Alouettes in the third round of the 2004 CFL draft but he continued for another year at Grand Valley State.

In August 2007 Bourke signed with Montreal. He missed the final game of the 2007 regular season and the playoffs due to a knee injury but signed a contract extension on January 7, 2008. His performance in the 2008 CFL season earned him a spot on the East Division All-Star team. Josh Bourke was recognized as a CFL Eastern All-Star every season from 2008 through the 2014 CFL season. Bourke won the Grey Cup with the Alouettes in both the 2009 CFL season and the 2010 CFL season.

Other personal accolades include being named the CFL Offensive lineman of the year in 2011, being selected to the CFLPA All-Star team from 2011 to 2013 and being named the CN Adopt an Alouette of the Year in 2013.

Following the 2013 campaign Bourke's contract expired on February 11, 2014. He was quickly re-signed roughly two hours after becoming a free-agent; signing the highest paid non-QB salary in the league at $215,000 per season (two-year deal).

=== Toronto Argonauts ===
On the first day of 2016 free agency, February 9, 2016, Bourke signed with Toronto Argonauts. Bourke played in 10 games for the double-blue in 2016, missing the second half of the season with injuries. Following only one season in Toronto, he was released by the club on January 9, 2017.

On June 17, 2017, Bourke announced his retirement from professional football at the age of 34.

Bourke was announced as a member of the Canadian Football Hall of Fame 2023 class on March 16, 2023.

== Later life ==
Bourke is currently a CFL Medical Board Member and a CFL players association player representative.
