= Odell Willis =

American gridiron football player (born 1984)

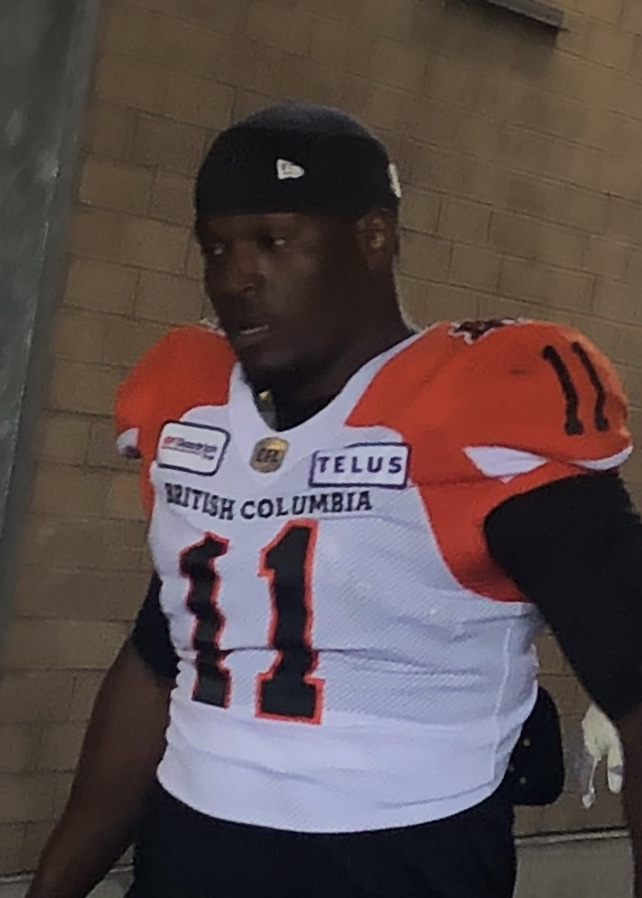
- Willis before a BC Lions game in 2019

Profile
- Position: Defensive end

Personal information
- Born: December 28, 1984 (age 41); Meridian, Mississippi, U.S.
- Listed height: 6 ft 2 in (1.88 m)
- Listed weight: 255 lb (116 kg)

Career information
- College: West Georgia
- NFL draft: 2008: undrafted

Career history
- 2007: Spokane Shock
- 2008: Huntington Heroes
- 2008: Peoria Pirates
- 2008: Green Bay Blizzard
- 2009: Calgary Stampeders
- 2009–2011: Winnipeg Blue Bombers
- 2012: Saskatchewan Roughriders
- 2013–2017: Edmonton Eskimos
- 2018: Ottawa Redblacks*
- 2018–2019: BC Lions
- 2021: Toronto Argonauts*
- * Offseason or practice squad member only

Awards and highlights
- Grey Cup champion (2015); 2× CFL All-Star (2011, 2014); CFL East All-Star (2011); CFL West All-Star (2014)

Career CFL statistics
- Tackles: 263
- Sacks: 101
- Forced fumbles: 24
- Stats at CFL.ca

Odell Willis (born December 28, 1984), nicknamed "the Mayor of Swaggerville", is a professional Canadian football defensive end who is a free agent. He was most recently a member of the Toronto Argonauts of the Canadian Football League (CFL). He was signed by the Spokane Shock as a free agent in 2007. He played college football for the West Georgia Wolves. Willis has also played for the Huntington Heroes, Peoria Pirates, Green Bay Blizzard, Calgary Stampeders, Winnipeg Blue Bombers, Saskatchewan Roughriders, Edmonton Eskimos, and BC Lions.

== College career ==
Willis played four seasons for the University of West Georgia and totaled 126 tackles, 20.5 sacks and six forced fumbles for the Wolves. He was twice named an All-Gulf South Conference selection.

== Professional career ==
=== af2 and AIFA ===
Willis was assigned to the Spokane Shock of the af2 on July 19, 2007. He signed with the Huntington Heroes of the American Indoor Football Association in January 2008 and played for the team during the 2008 season. He played for the Peoria Pirates of the af2 later in 2008. In July 2008, he was traded to the Green Bay Blizzard.

=== Calgary Stampeders ===
In 2009, Willis signed with the Calgary Stampeders where he recorded six sacks in his first nine games.

=== Winnipeg Blue Bombers ===
He was then traded to the Winnipeg Blue Bombers in a package trade, where he recorded another four sacks with the Blue Bombers. In his 2010 campaign, Willis started all 18 games and recorded 11 sacks. During the 2011 CFL season, Willis started all 18 games for the second consecutive year and set a new career high with 13 sacks. His performance earned him his first CFL East Division All-Star nod and recognition on his first CFL All-Star team a short while later.

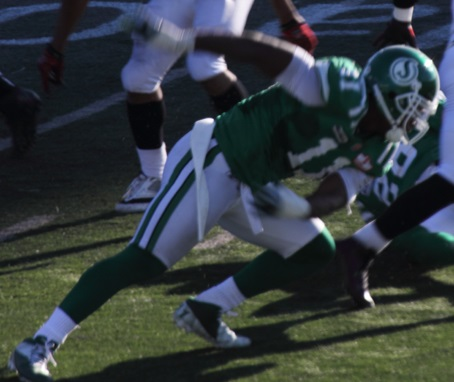
Willis rushing the QB in 2012.

=== Saskatchewan Roughriders ===
On March 22, 2012, Willis was traded to the Saskatchewan Roughriders for second and fourth round picks in the 2012 CFL draft. Willis recorded 6 sacks in the 2012 CFL season.

=== Edmonton Eskimos ===
After not being re-signed following one season with the Roughriders, Willis signed a three-year contract with the Edmonton Eskimos on February 15, 2013 (The first day of CFL free-agency). In his first season with the Eskimos Willis played in 13 of the 18 regular season games. He would finish the season with 22 tackles, 9 quarterback sacks and 1 fumble recovery. Willis' play improved again the following season, earning himself his second CFL All-Star award and his first CFL West All-Star award. His 13 sacks put him tied for 2nd place for most sacks on the season; he also had 32 tackles, 2 interceptions (one for a touchdown) and a fumble recovery. Following the 2014 CFL season, Willis re-signed with the Eskimos.

=== Ottawa Redblacks ===
On February 2, 2018, Willis was traded to the Ottawa Redblacks for fellow defensive lineman, Jake Ceresna. His tenure with the Redblacks lasted 17 minutes.

=== BC Lions ===
Shortly after he was traded to the Redblacks, Willis was again traded on February 2, 2018 back to the West Division to the BC Lions for a fourth-round pick in the 2018 CFL draft and a negotiation list player. Willis continued to perform as a pass rushing threat, recording 11 sacks over the season, a personal best since the 2014 season. Following the season Willis re-signed with the Lions for the 2019 CFL season. In 2019, Willis was switched to defensive tackle mid-season, contributing to lower than usual production of four sacks on the year, but he still managed to pass the milestone of 100 career sacks. He became a free agent in 2020, but did not play due to the cancellation of the 2020 CFL season.

=== Toronto Argonauts ===
On February 12, 2021, it was announced that Willis had signed with the Toronto Argonauts. He was placed on the suspended list on July 20, 2021. He began the season on the suspended list before moving to the practice roster in week 2 of the regular season, but was released on August 17, 2021.
