= Jonathan Hefney =

American gridiron football player (born 1985)

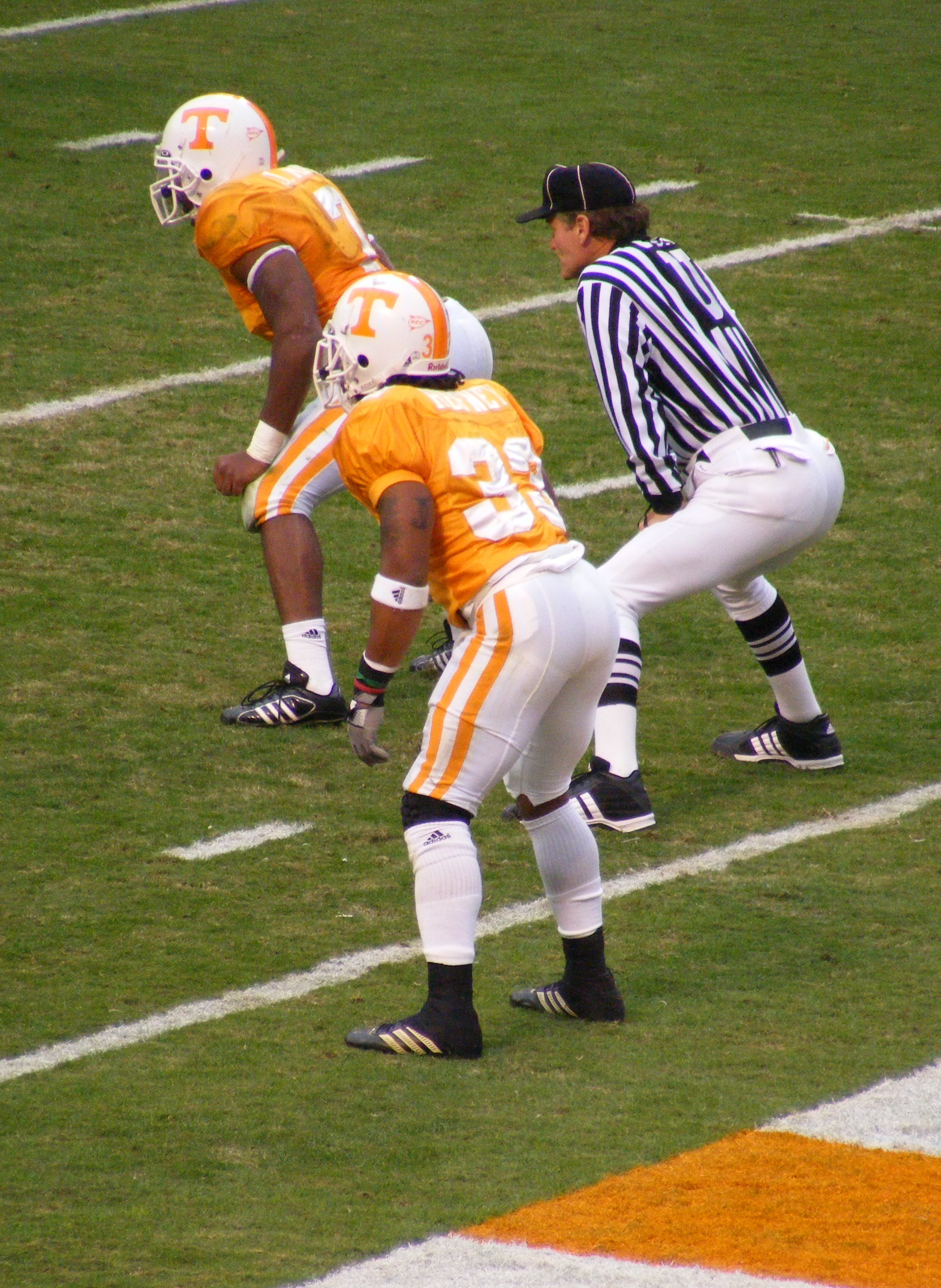
- Hefney while playing at Tennessee

No. 33
- Position: Defensive Halfback

Personal information
- Born: February 27, 1985 (age 41); Rock Hill, South Carolina, U.S.
- Listed height: 5 ft 9 in (1.75 m)
- Listed weight: 185 lb (84 kg)

Career information
- High school: Rock Hill
- College: Tennessee

Career history
- 2008: Tampa Bay Buccaneers*
- 2008: Philadelphia Eagles*
- 2009: Winnipeg Blue Bombers
- 2010: Detroit Lions*
- 2010–2013: Winnipeg Blue Bombers
- 2013–2014: Calgary Stampeders
- 2015: Montreal Alouettes
- * Offseason or practice squad member only

Awards and highlights
- Frank M. Gibson Trophy (2009); 2× CFL All-Star (2009, 2011); 3× CFL East All-Star (2009, 2011, 2012); First-team All-SEC (2007); Second-team All-SEC (2006)
- Stats at CFL.ca (archive)

Jonathan Jerrod Hefney (born February 27, 1985) is an American former professional football defensive back. He was signed by the Tampa Bay Buccaneers of the National Football League (NFL) as an undrafted free agent in 2008. He played college football for the Tennessee Volunteers.

Hefney was also a member of the Winnipeg Blue Bombers, Calgary Stampeders, and Montreal Alouettes of the Canadian Football League (CFL), as well as the NFL's Philadelphia Eagles and Detroit Lions.

== Early life ==
Hefney played high school football at Rock Hill High School in Rock Hill, South Carolina. He led his school to an undefeated record in 2002. Following his senior season, Hefney played at Hargrave Military Academy in Chatham, Virginia.

== College career ==
Hefney was a four-year starter at either cornerback or safety during his time at Tennessee, starting every game except for the 2004 season opener against UNLV. Hefney also garnered attention as a punt return specialist.

== Professional career ==
=== Tampa Bay Buccaneers ===
Hefney was expected to be selected early in the 2008 NFL draft but instead he went undrafted, and signed with the Tampa Bay Buccaneers. On July 25, 2008, he was released from the Buccaneers. Hefney was signed to the Philadelphia Eagles practice squad on September 9, 2008.

=== Winnipeg Blue Bombers (first stint) ===
Failing to make an NFL team, the Winnipeg Blue Bombers of the CFL signed Hefney on May 28, 2009. He recorded 66 tackles and four interceptions his rookie season, earning Eastern Division Rookie of the Year and All-Star honors. However Hefney left the next year to play in the NFL again.

=== Detroit Lions ===
His time in the NFL that year was short however as Hefney was signed by the Detroit Lions on January 4, 2010, and released on September 4, 2010. He was re-signed to the practice squad on September 6, and released on September 23.

=== Winnipeg Blue Bombers (second stint) ===
He returned to the Blue Bombers four days after being released by the Detroit Lions. The 2011 Winnipeg Blue Bombers season saw Hefney as part of the self-titled "Swaggerville" defence that was arguably tops in the league. That season, Hefney won his second nod as a CFL East Division all-star, and was then named to his second CFL All-Star team a short time later. Hefney was named a CFL East Division all-star again in 2012. Just prior to the start of June 2013 training camp, Hefney was charged with marijuana possession in his home state of South Carolina. He was released by the Bombers on June 15, 2013. Hefney played three full seasons and parts of a fourth with the Winnipeg Blue Bombers.

=== Calgary Stampeders ===
On June 18, 2013, 3 days after being released by Winnipeg, Hefney signed with the Calgary Stampeders of the Canadian Football League He was released by the Stampeders on May 21, 2014.

=== Montreal Allouettes ===
Hefney was under contract with the Montreal Alouettes in 2015 when he suffered a career-ending injury early in a Week 15 game against the Ottawa Redblacks. He suffered the injury after making helmet-to-helmet contact with Ottawa Fullback Patrick Lavoie, suffering significant nerve damage in his right side as a consequence.

== Personal life ==
In September 2019 Hefney was sentenced to three years in jail for trafficking cocaine.
