= Jason Vega =

American gridiron football player (born 1987)

No. 92
- Position: Defensive end

Personal information
- Born: May 30, 1987 (age 39); Brockton, Massachusetts, U.S.
- Listed height: 6 ft 4 in (1.93 m)
- Listed weight: 255 lb (116 kg)

Career information
- High school: Brockton High
- College: Northeastern

Career history
- 2011−2012: Winnipeg Blue Bombers
- 2013: New England Patriots*
- 2013: Dallas Cowboys
- 2014: Winnipeg Blue Bombers
- 2015: Toronto Argonauts
- 2016: Edmonton Eskimos
- 2017: Winnipeg Blue Bombers*
- * Offseason or practice squad member only

Career CFL statistics
- Tackles: 82
- Sacks: 17
- Interceptions: 0
- Stats at Pro Football Reference
- Stats at CFL.ca

Jason Vega (born May 30, 1987) is a retired Canadian football and American football defensive end. He played the majority of his professional career in the Canadian Football League (CFL), and more specifically with the Winnipeg Blue Bombers. Elsewhere in the CFL he was a member of the Toronto Argonauts and Edmonton Eskimos. In his time in the NFL he was affiliated with the New England Patriots and played for the Dallas Cowboys.

== College career ==
He played college football at Northeastern University.

== Professional career ==
=== Winnipeg Blue Bombers (first stint) ===
Vega signed with the Winnipeg Blue Bombers of the Canadian Football League. During the 2011 Winnipeg Blue Bombers season, Vega was named defensive player of the week for their win over the Alouettes at the end of October. He finished his rookie season in the CFL with 26 tackles and 7 sacks. The following season Vega contributed 40 tackles and 5 quarterback sacks.

=== New England Patriots ===
Vega signed with the New England Patriots on January 26, 2013. He was released on August 13, 2013.

=== Dallas Cowboys ===
On August 21, 2013, Vega was signed by the Dallas Cowboys. Vega appeared in 2 games for the Cowboys in the 2013 NFL season; tallying 1 tackle.

=== Winnipeg Blue Bombers (second stint) ===
After one season playing in the NFL, Vega signed a new contract with the Bombers on December 23, 2013. Terms of the contract were not released as per team regulations. During the 2014 campaign Vega totaled 16 tackles and 5 sacks. On April 28, 2015 Vega was released by the Blue Bombers; reportedly to free up cap space.

=== Toronto Argonauts ===
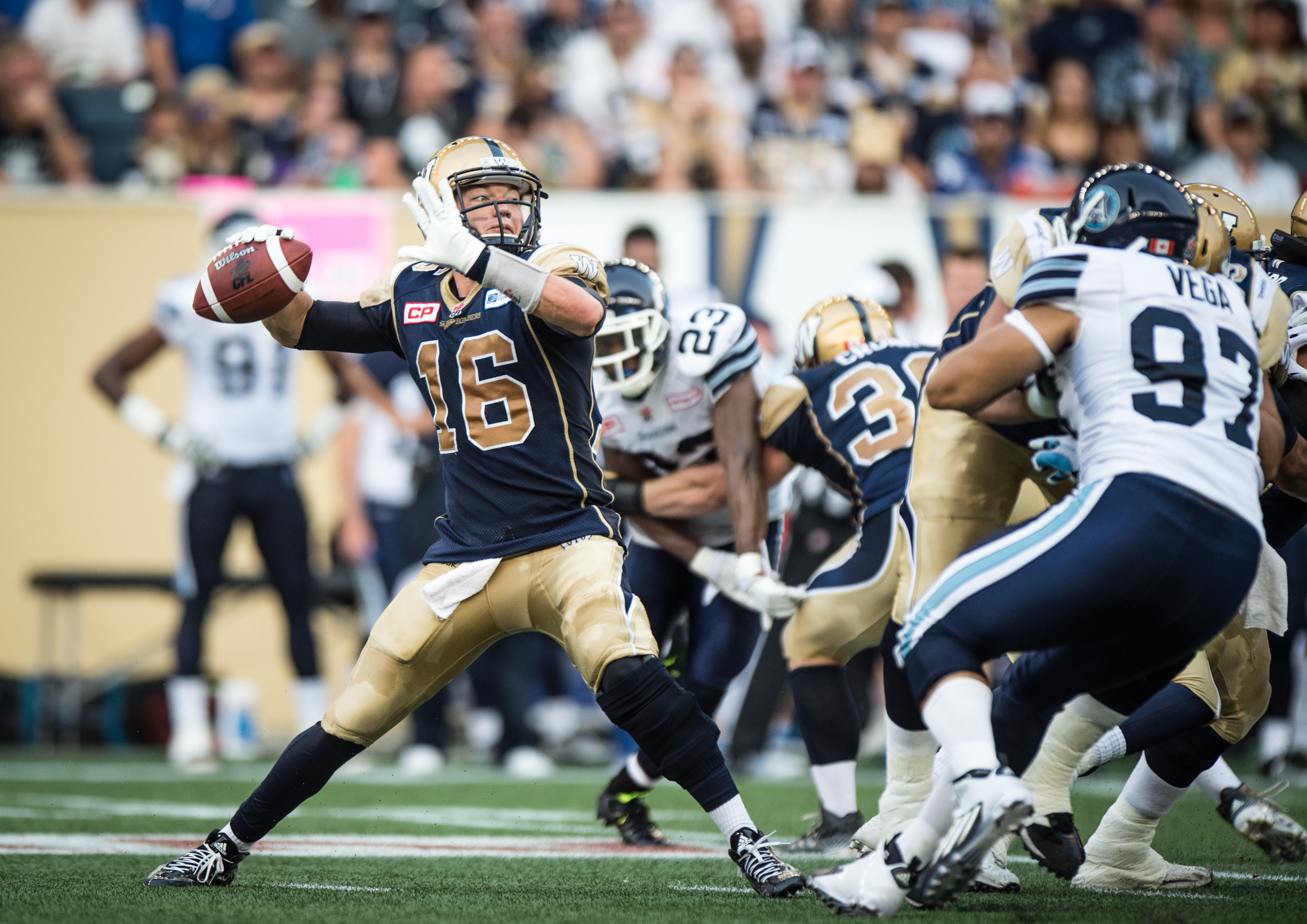
Vega (right) in pursuit of Winnipeg quarterback Robert Marve

On June 22, 2015, Vega signed with the Toronto Argonauts of the Canadian Football League. Following the season he was not re-signed and became a free agent.

=== Edmonton Eskimos ===
Vega signed with the Edmonton Eskimos on August 16, 2016. Vega only appeared in 4 games during the 2016 season, contributing 11 tackles and one quarterback sack. After the season, he was released by the Eskimos.

=== Winnipeg Blue Bombers (third stint) ===
On February 8, 2017 Vega signed a one-day contract with the Blue Bombers and retired.
