= Glenn January =

American gridiron football player (born 1983)

Profile
- Position: Offensive tackle

Personal information
- Born: May 25, 1983 (age 43); Houston, Texas, U.S.
- Listed height: 6 ft 5 in (1.96 m)
- Listed weight: 310 lb (141 kg)

Career information
- College: Texas Tech
- NFL draft: 2007: undrafted

Career history
- 2007: Tampa Bay Buccaneers
- 2007: Toronto Argonauts
- 2008: Saskatchewan Roughriders
- 2009–2015: Winnipeg Blue Bombers

Awards and highlights
- 3× CFL East All-Star (2011, 2012, 2013)
- Stats at CFL.ca (archive)

Glenn Arwin January Jr. (born May 25, 1983) is a former professional Canadian football offensive tackle.

== Early life ==
He attended Second Baptist School and played high school football there. Additionally, he was in the choir his senior year, and part of a renowned dancing duet with his close pal Sam Whiteside. After having a small jazz band in Houston, TX with high school chaps with Jackson Osborne and Ronnie Bloomstrom, Glenn moved on to bigger and better things. Collegiately, January was an offensive lineman for the Texas Tech Red Raiders.

== Professional career ==
He remained undrafted in the 2007 NFL draft and signed as a free agent with the Buccaneers.

On May 30, 2007, January signed with the Toronto Argonauts of the Canadian Football League. On March 5, 2008, he was traded to the Saskatchewan Roughriders, along with Ronald Flemons, Toronto's first round selection in the 2008 CFL draft, and Toronto's second round selection in the 2010 CFL draft in exchange for Kerry Joseph and Saskatchewan's third round pick in the 2010 Canadian Draft. Both Toronto and Saskatchewan were unhappy with January's play, but he went on to a decent career with the Winnipeg Blue Bombers.

January became a free agent and signed the same day with the Winnipeg Blue Bombers on January 16, 2009. January won his first nod as a CFL East Division All-Star during the 2011 Winnipeg Blue Bombers season.
