= Brendon LaBatte =

Canadian football player (born 1986)

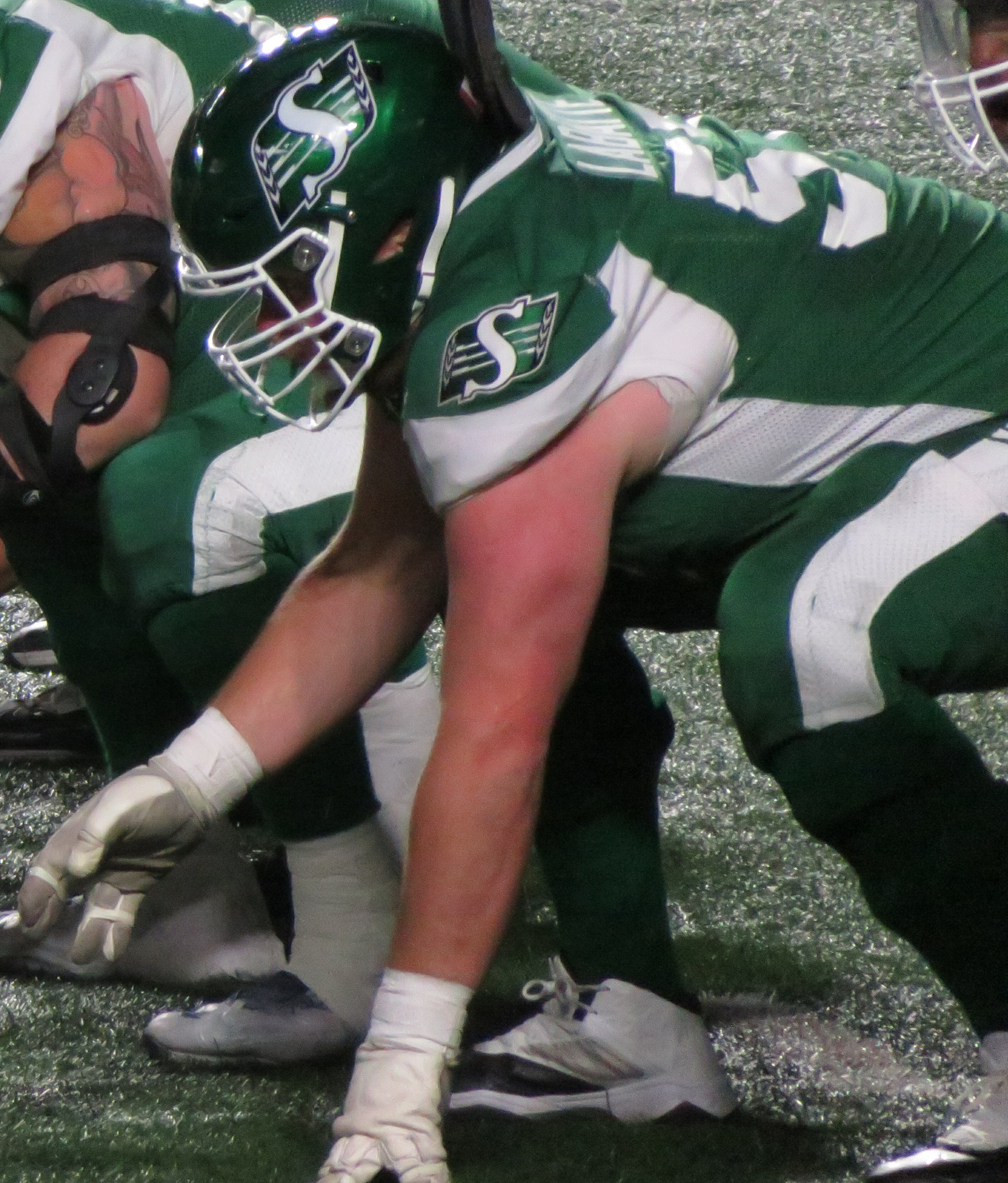
- LaBatte with the Saskatchewan Roughriders in 2019

No. 57
- Position: Offensive guard

Personal information
- Born: September 12, 1986 (age 40); Weyburn, Saskatchewan, Canada
- Listed height: 6 ft 4 in (1.93 m)
- Listed weight: 323 lb (147 kg)

Career information
- University: Regina
- CFL draft: 2008: 1st round, 6th overall pick

Career history
- 2008–2011: Winnipeg Blue Bombers
- 2012–2022: Saskatchewan Roughriders

Awards and highlights
- Grey Cup champion (2013); 6× CFL All-Star (2011, 2013–2015, 2017–2018); 3× CFL East All-Star (2009–2011); 6× CFL West All-Star (2012–2015, 2017–2018); CFL's Most Outstanding Offensive Lineman Award (2013); DeMarco–Becket Memorial Trophy (2013)
- Stats at CFL.ca

Brendon LaBatte (born September 12, 1986) is a Canadian former professional football guard. He was drafted sixth overall by the Winnipeg Blue Bombers in the 2008 CFL draft. He played CIS Football with the Regina Rams.

== Career ==
LaBatte was drafted by the Winnipeg Blue Bombers with the sixth overall pick in the 2008 CFL draft. He went on to win three consecutive CFL East Division All-Star awards from 2009 to 2011. Prior to the 2011 East Division final, Labatte was named to his first ever CFL All-Star team.

LaBatte won the 2013 Grey Cup with Saskatchewan on November 24, 2013. He signed a contract extension with the Roughriders through the 2022 season on December 23, 2020. He opted out of the 2021 CFL season for personal reasons before the start of the season, and the team placed him on their suspended list on July 3.
