= Alex Hall (American football) =

American gridiron football player (born 1985)

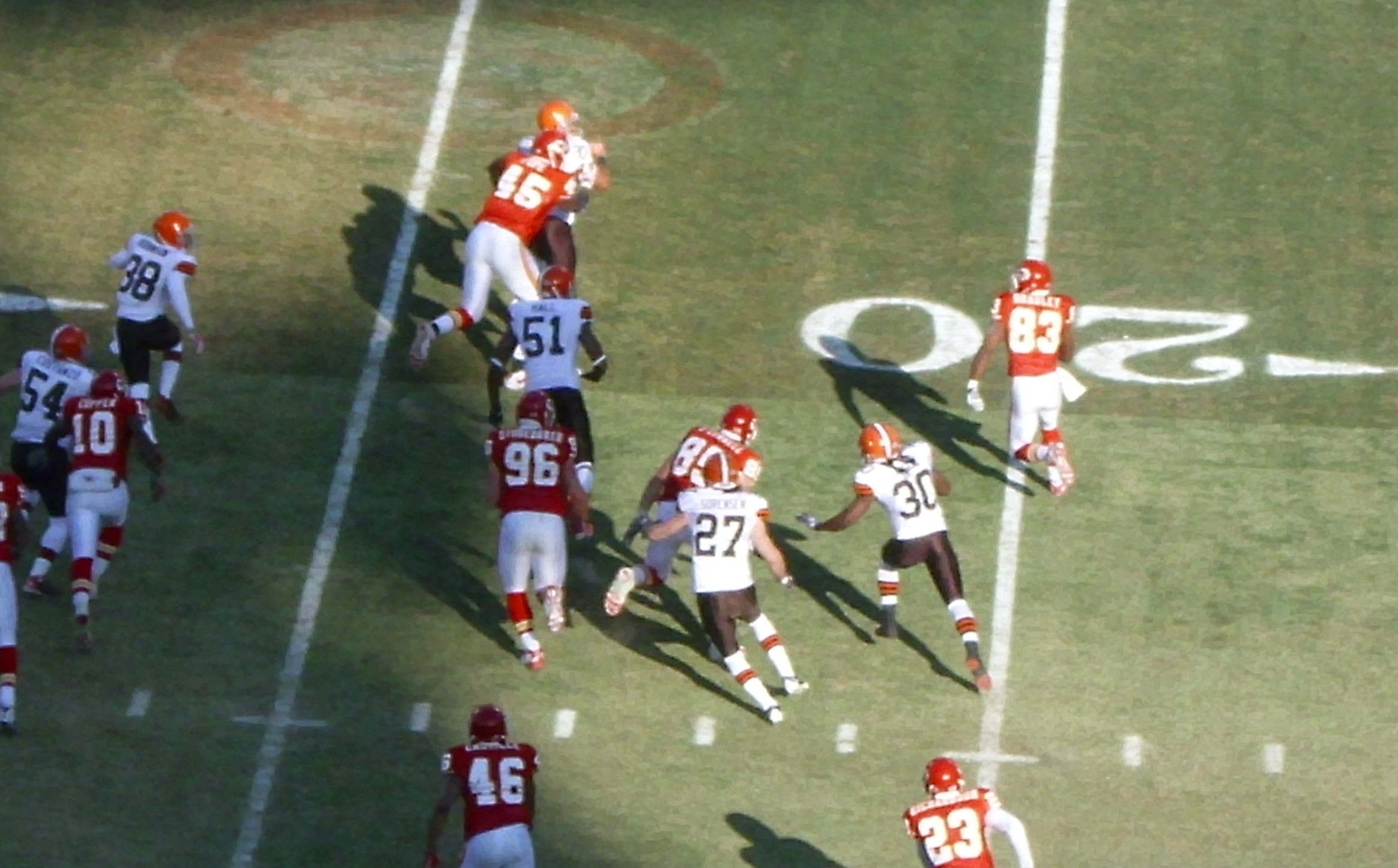
- Hall (#51) chases after a player during a game

No. 96, 51, 93
- Positions: Defensive end, linebacker

Personal information
- Born: August 17, 1985 (age 41); Glenarden, Maryland, U.S.
- Listed height: 6 ft 5 in (1.96 m)
- Listed weight: 250 lb (113 kg)

Career information
- High school: C.H. Flowers (MD)
- College: St. Augustine's College
- NFL draft: 2008: 7th round, 231st overall pick

Career history
- Cleveland Browns (2008–2009); Philadelphia Eagles (2010)*; New York Giants (2010)*; Arizona Cardinals (2010); New York Giants (2010); Winnipeg Blue Bombers (2012–2013); Saskatchewan Roughriders (2013); Carolina Panthers (2014)*; Saskatchewan Roughriders (2015)
- * Offseason or practice squad member only

Awards and highlights
- 2× First-team All-CIAA (2006-2007); 2× NCAA Division II All-American (2006-2007)

Career NFL statistics
- Total tackles: 39
- Sacks: 3
- Forced fumbles: 3
- Fumble recoveries: 1
- Stats at Pro Football Reference

Alex Hall (born August 17, 1985) is a former professional Canadian football defensive end. He was selected by the Cleveland Browns in the seventh round of the 2008 NFL draft. He played college football at St. Augustine's College.

Hall was a member of the Philadelphia Eagles, Arizona Cardinals, New York Giants, and Carolina Panthers in the National Football League and the Winnipeg Blue Bombers and Saskatchewan Roughriders of the CFL.

== Professional career ==
Pre-draft measurables
Height	Weight
6 ft 4 3/4 in (1.95 m)	238 lb (108 kg)
Values from Pro Day

=== Cleveland Browns ===
Hall was selected by the Cleveland Browns in the seventh round of the 2008 NFL draft with the 231st overall pick. He signed a four-year contract with the team on July 22, 2008.

=== Philadelphia Eagles ===
On April 2, 2010, Hall and the 2010 fourth and fifth-round draft picks were traded to the Philadelphia Eagles in exchange for linebacker Chris Gocong and Sheldon Brown. He was waived on July 28, 2010.

=== New York Giants ===
Hall was claimed off waivers by the New York Giants on July 29, 2010. He was waived by the Giants on September 4, 2010.

=== Arizona Cardinals ===
Hall signed with the Arizona Cardinals on September 21, 2010. He was waived by the team on October 30.

=== New York Giants (second stint) ===
Hall was claimed off waivers from the Arizona Cardinals on November 1, 2010, and placed on the active roster, replacing Giants cornerback Bruce Johnson, who was placed on injured reserve. On November 27, Hall was waived to make room for Michael Coe, who was signed to the active roster. While he worked out for the Pittsburgh Steelers on December 14, 2010, he was re-signed on December 15 after linebacker Clint Sintim was placed on injured reserve.

=== Winnipeg Blue Bombers ===
Hall signed with the Winnipeg Blue Bombers of the Canadian Football League on April 24, 2012. He ended the season as an East Division All-Star and was named Winnipeg's Most Outstanding Defensive Player.

=== Saskatchewan Roughriders ===
On October 6, 2013, Hall was traded (along with a 2nd-round pick in the 2014 CFL draft) to the Saskatchewan Roughriders in exchange for non-import lineman Patrick Neufeld and a 5th round selection in 2015 CFL draft. At the time of the trade, Hall led the league in sacks with 15, by the end of the season he would be 2nd in the league with 16 sacks. Since Hall's CFL contract expired at the end of the 2013 CFL season it was expected that would try out for an NFL team for the following season. Hall also won the Grey Cup that year.

=== Carolina Panthers ===
On April 11, 2014, Hall signed with the Carolina Panthers. The Panthers released Hall on August 24, 2014.

=== Saskatchewan Roughriders (II) ===
Hall re-signed with the Roughriders on February 11, 2015.
