= Clarence Denmark =

American gridiron football player (born 1985)

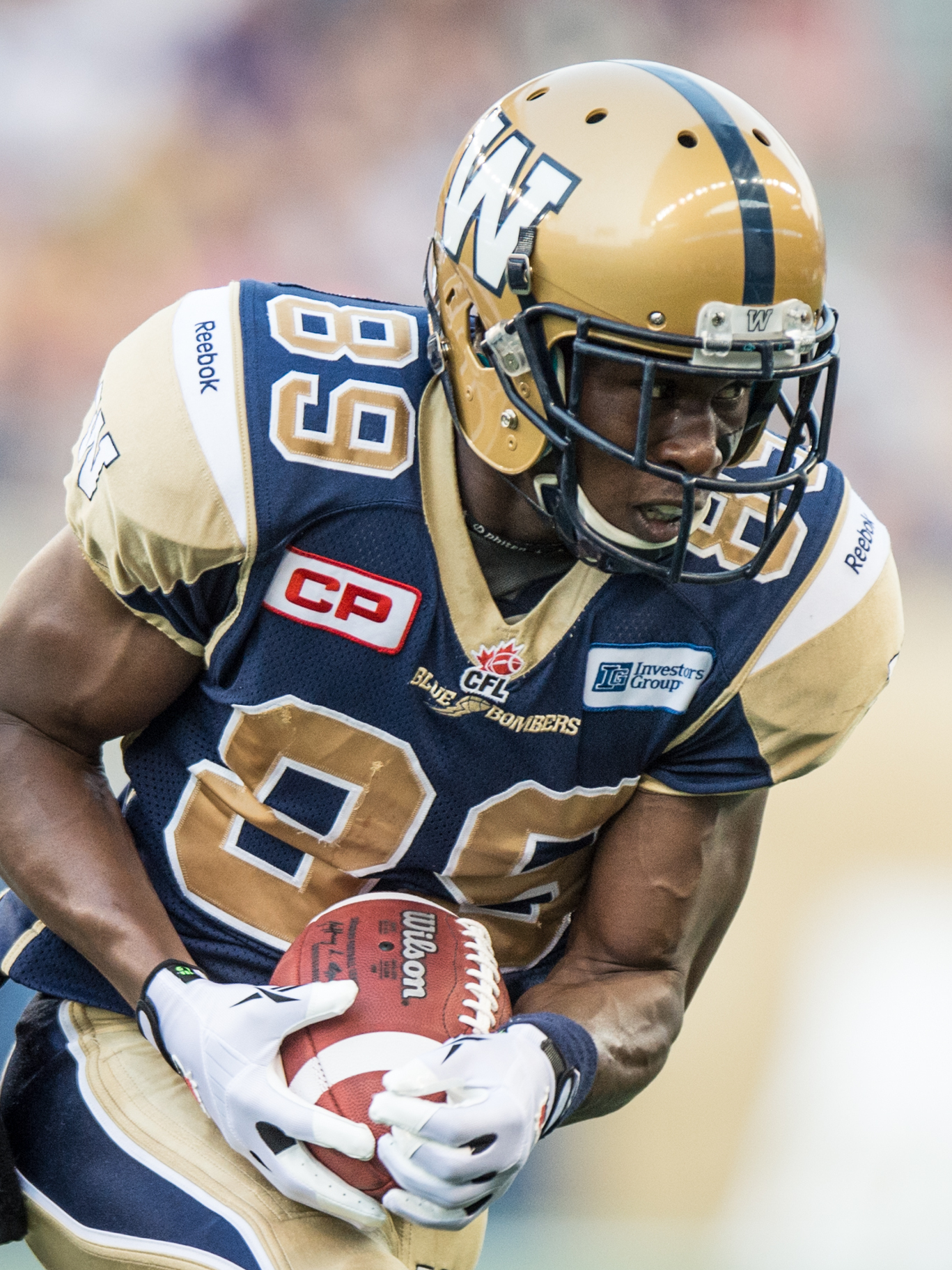
- Denmark with the Winnipeg Blue Bombers in 2015

No. 89
- Position: Wide receiver

Personal information
- Born: September 29, 1985 (age 41); Jacksonville, Florida, U.S.
- Listed height: 5 ft 11 in (1.80 m)
- Listed weight: 185 lb (84 kg)

Career information
- College: Arkansas-Monticello

Career history
- 2009–2010: Jacksonville Jaguars*
- 2011–2015: Winnipeg Blue Bombers
- 2016: Saskatchewan Roughriders*
- 2016–2017: Winnipeg Blue Bombers
- * Offseason or practice squad member only

Awards and highlights
- CFL All-Star (2014); CFL West All-Star (2014)
- Stats at CFL.ca

Clarence Traneil Denmark (born September 29, 1985) is an American former professional football wide receiver who played seven seasons for the Winnipeg Blue Bombers of the Canadian Football League (CFL). Prior to his time in the CFL, Denmark was a member of the Jacksonville Jaguars of the National Football League (NFL). He played college football at Mississippi Delta Community College, Troy University, and Arkansas-Monticello.

== Professional career ==
=== Jacksonville Jaguars ===
Denmark was signed as an undrafted free agent by the Jacksonville Jaguars on August 2, 2009. Denmark, however, was waived on September 1, 2009. He was later signed to the practice squad on December 5, 2009. Denmark was signed as a free agent on January 5, 2010 and he spent the entire offseason with the team; however he was cut on September 4, 2010. On September 13, 2010, Denmark was signed to the practice squad, but subsequently waived five days later. On November 2, 2010, Denmark was once again added to the Jaguars' practice squad.

=== Winnipeg Blue Bombers ===
On May 16, 2011, the Winnipeg Blue Bombers signed Denmark as an import player. Denmark had seven catches for 89 yards and a touchdown in Winnipeg's two pre-season games. Denmark made his first regular season start during Week 2 of the 2011 CFL season: He made four receptions for a total of 38 yards. He would finish his inaugural CFL season as the Bombers second best WR with 818 yards and 5 touchdowns. 2012 was a bit of a down season for Denmark, he only amassed 620 yards and 1 touchdown. He was the leading receiver for the Blue Bombers in both the 2013 and 2014 seasons. In 2013, he accumulated 900 receiving yards and 4 touchdowns, in 2014, he finished second in the league in receiving yards with 1,080 and added 3 touchdowns. His performance was recognized when he was named not only a CFL West All-Star, but a CFL All-Star. Denmark played in all 18 regular season games in this 5th season with the Bombers, catching 57 passes for 718 yards. He was released by the Blue Bombers on March 22, 2016.

=== Saskatchewan Roughriders ===
On May 13, 2016, Denmark signed with the Saskatchewan Roughriders. On June 19, 2016, he was released as part of the Roughriders final cuts.

=== Winnipeg Blue Bombers (II) ===
On July 31, 2016, Denmark was brought back by the Blue Bombers due to injuries to Winnipeg's regular starting receivers. His first game back with the Blue Bombers was a Week 7 victory over Hamilton, in which he recorded seven catches for 69 yards, including a touchdown. He finished the season with 53 catches for 705 yards and eight touchdowns in just 10 games played. In the following off-season, he entered free agency, but eventually re-signed with the Blue Bombers for a seventh season on February 17, 2017. He played in all 18 games in 2017, recording 58 catches for 608 receiving yards and seven touchdowns. In the following off-season, he was not offered another contract by the Blue Bombers and became a free agent.

== Personal life ==
He resides in Jacksonville, Florida. He attended Robert E. Lee High School.
