= Carl Volny =

Canadian football player (born 1987)

No. 29
- Position: Running back

Personal information
- Born: December 25, 1987 (age 38); Montreal, Quebec, Canada
- Listed height: 5 ft 10 in (1.78 m)
- Listed weight: 195 lb (88 kg)

Career information
- University: Central Michigan
- CFL draft: 2011: 5th round, 32nd overall pick

Career history
- 2011–2014: Winnipeg Blue Bombers
- 2015: Montreal Alouettes
- Stats at CFL.ca

Carl Volny (born December 25, 1987) is a Canadian former professional football running back. Volny was drafted 32nd overall in the draft by the Winnipeg Blue Bombers and signed a contract with the team on May 18, 2011. He played college football with the Central Michigan Chippewas.
