= Michel-Pierre Pontbriand =

Canadian football player (born 1985)

No. 39
- Position: Fullback

Personal information
- Born: March 4, 1985 (age 41); Saint-Sauveur, Quebec, Canada
- Listed height: 6 ft 2 in (1.88 m)
- Listed weight: 245 lb (111 kg)

Career information
- High school: Charles-Lemoyne / Edouard-Montpetit
- University: Laval
- CFL draft: 2007: undrafted

Career history
- 2011–2016: Winnipeg Blue Bombers
- Stats at CFL.ca (archive)

Medal record

Men's American football

Representing Canada

World Championship
Silver medal – second place	2011 Austria	Team competition

Michel-Pierre Pontbriand (born March 4, 1985) is a Canadian former professional football fullback. He was signed as undrafted free agent by the Winnipeg Blue Bombers on August 17, 2011. This was after playing and finishing as a 1st team all-star as the special teams captain for Team Canada at the football Senior Men's World Championship in Austria. He played CIS Football with the Laval Rouge et Or. He won 3 national championships with Laval as a starter and played in 2 East-West bowl games in Quebec. He played 3 years for Team Quebec when he was in college, and played with the 2003 Canadian Junior Team in San Diego as well. He was named captain on the Bombers special team squad from 2012 to 2016. He was recognized for his strong leadership, work ethic, and discipline. During his professional career, he competed in all regular season and playoff games while spending time doing volunteer work for various Winnipeg football programs. Before playing football, he played AAA soccer, hockey, and baseball until the age of 18.
