= 2012 CFL season =

Canadian Football League season

- Duration: June 29 – November 3, 2012
- East champions: Toronto Argonauts
- West champions: Calgary Stampeders

100th Grey Cup
- Date: November 25, 2012
- Venue: Rogers Centre, Toronto
- Champions: Toronto Argonauts

CFL seasons
- ← 2011 2013 →

Canadian Football League team locations: West, East

The 2012 CFL season was the 59th season of modern-day Canadian football. Officially, it was the 55th season for the Canadian Football League. The pre-season began on June 13, 2012, and the regular season started on June 29, 2012. Rogers Centre in Toronto hosted the 100th Grey Cup on November 25, with the hometown Toronto Argonauts defeating the Calgary Stampeders 35–22.

== CFL news in 2012 ==
=== Salary cap ===
According to the new collective bargaining agreement, the 2012 salary cap was set at $4,350,000. As per the agreement, the cap is fixed and will not vary with league revenue performance. The minimum team salary will be set at $4,000,000 with individual minimum salaries set at $44,000.

=== Season schedule ===
The 2012 season schedule was released on February 18, 2012, with the regular season opening on June 29 at Ivor Wynne Stadium in Hamilton, Ontario. This marked the first time Hamilton has opened the year since 2009. Additionally, the league returned to division match-ups in the final week of the regular season, which was also last seen in 2009. Following an interruption in the Labour Day Classic in 2011 between the Toronto Argonauts and Hamilton Tiger-Cats, the two teams resumed their historic series in 2012. There were 15 double headers this year, with four on Fridays, eight on Saturdays, one on Sundays, and two (the traditional Labour Day and Thanksgiving contests) on Mondays.

The BC Lions opened their regular season schedule at the newly refurbished BC Place Stadium and spent their first full season there after splitting time between that stadium and Empire Field in 2011. The Winnipeg Blue Bombers spent the first four weeks of the regular season on the road as their home opener at the brand new Investors Group Field was to take place in week 5; however, construction delays pushed back the opening of the new stadium to 2013, forcing the Blue Bombers to continue playing at Canad Inns Stadium during the season. The Tiger-Cats played—and won—their final regular season home game at Ivor Wynne Stadium on October 27 as the stadium was demolished following the 2012 season. Unlike the previous two seasons, there was no game played in Moncton, New Brunswick, as part of the Touchdown Atlantic promotion, due to the league wanting to focus on plans for the 100th Grey Cup festival.

=== Bye weeks ===
This year's bye weeks occurred in the sixth and seventh weeks of the season, earlier than the usual eighth and ninth week setup that has been in place since 2007. This was likely done to accommodate the 2012 Summer Olympics, and the television coverage they demanded, which took place over these two weeks.

=== Uniform changes ===
According to an email, Reebok and the CFL were in the process of designing new home and away uniforms for each of the eight teams for 2012. On April 11, 2012, it was officially announced that all eight teams would be playing in re-engineered jerseys that feature increased elasticity, improved resiliency and moisture wicking technology. East Division teams released their jersey designs on May 1, while West Division teams unveiled their new jerseys on May 2.

=== Rule changes ===
On April 18, 2012, the CFL announced that they had unanimously approved a rule change that will see all scoring plays subject to video review. All touchdowns would be reviewed by the referees, without a team having to use its challenge flag. Due to a surprising number of incidents related to players helmets falling off during play in the 2011 CFL season, the league decided to change its rules to address this issue. Now if a ball carrier's helmet comes off the play will be blown dead immediately. If a non-ball carrier's helmet comes off that player can no longer participate in the play. If he does, the player's team will be penalized 10 yards for illegal participation. If a player hits an opposing player who isn't participating because he lost his helmet, the offending player's team will be penalized 15 yards for unnecessary roughness.

=== 100th Grey Cup ===
Toronto was the site of the 100th Grey Cup as it was also host of the first game and host of the 50th Grey Cup as well. As part of the celebration, the Grey Cup festival stretched over nine days as opposed to the usual three. The Government of Canada also contributed $5 million towards the event in celebration of a Canadian tradition.

=== Records and milestones ===
- On June 29, while playing against the Winnipeg Blue Bombers and with the former record holder Milt Stegall in attendance, Geroy Simon became the all-time CFL career reception yards leader, surpassing the previous mark of 15,153 yards.
- On September 3, Chris Williams surpassed Henry Williams for most kick return touchdowns in a single season with his sixth (five punt returns, one missed field goal return). In the same game, he also set a new record for most consecutive games with a return touchdown with three.
- On October 12, Andrew Harris set a new single-season record for yards from scrimmage by a Canadian, surpassing Terry Evanshen's mark of 1,662 yards set in 1967. Harris finished with 1,830 yards, becoming the second non-import to lead the league in yards from scrimmage.
- On November 1, Chad Owens passed Michael Clemons for most combined yards in a season with a 29-yard kickoff return. Owens finished the season with 3,863 all-purpose yards while also becoming the first professional football player to record three 3,000-yard seasons. Owens also became the first player to lead the league in both receiving yards (1,328) and total kick return yards (2,510).
- On November 2, Jon Cornish surpassed Normie Kwong for most rushing yards in a season by a Canadian, finishing with 1,457 rushing yards. Cornish also finished first in rushing, which was the first time that a non-import led the league in rushing since Orville Lee in 1988.
- On November 2, J. C. Sherritt recorded his 130th tackle, passing Calvin Tiggle's mark of 129 for most tackles in a single season.

== Off-season ==
=== Coaching changes ===
The 2012 off-season saw significant changes in key personal across the league. After winning the 99th Grey Cup, the then head coach of the BC Lions, Wally Buono, resigned from being the head coach so he could focus on his duties as general manager. The Lions promoted Mike Benevides, who was the defensive coordinator for four seasons, to head coach. After an 8–10 season, the Hamilton Tiger-Cats fired head coach Marcel Bellefeuille and hired George Cortez who has had extensive coaching experience with many different CFL teams. Following a very disappointing 2011 season, the Saskatchewan Roughriders hired Corey Chamblin as their new head coach. Finally, the Toronto Argonauts hired Scott Milanovich who had been the offensive coordinator of the Montreal Alouettes for four seasons, to replace Jim Barker who, like Wally Buono, resigned from being the head coach to focus on being general manager.

== Regular season ==
=== Structure ===
Teams play eighteen regular season games, playing two of the three divisional opponents three times, the other four times, and teams from the opposing division twice. Teams are awarded two points for a win and one point for a tie. The top three teams in each division qualify for the playoffs, with the first place team gaining a bye to the divisional finals. A fourth place team in one division may qualify ahead of the third place team in the other division (the "Crossover"), if they earn more points in the season. Such was the case in the 2012 season; Edmonton (the fourth-place team in the West) had more points than Winnipeg (the third-place team in the East).

If two or more teams in the same division are equal in points, the following tiebreakers apply:

- a) Most wins in all games
- b) Head to head winning percentage (matches won divided by all matches played)
- c) Head to head points difference
- d) Head to head points ratio
- e–g) Tiebreakers b–d applied sequentially to all divisional games
- h–i) Tiebreakers c–d applied sequentially to all league games
- j) Coin toss

Notes:

- 1. If two clubs remain tied after other club(s) are eliminated during any step, tie breakers reverts to step a).
- 2. Tiebreakers do not apply to the Crossover. To cross over a team must have more points than the third place team.

=== Standings ===
Note: GP = Games Played, W = Wins, L = Losses, T = Ties, PF = Points For, PA = Points Against, Pts = Points

Teams in bold are in playoff positions.

West Division
Team	GP	W	L	T	PF	PA	Pts	
**BC Lions**	18	13	5	0	481	354	26	Details
**Calgary Stampeders**	18	12	6	0	534	431	24	Details
**Saskatchewan Roughriders**	18	8	10	0	457	409	16	Details
**Edmonton Eskimos**	18	7	11	0	422	450	14	Details

East Division
Team	GP	W	L	T	PF	PA	Pts	
**Montreal Alouettes**	18	11	7	0	478	489	22	Details
**Toronto Argonauts**	18	9	9	0	445	491	18	Details
Winnipeg Blue Bombers	18	6	12	0	376	531	12	Details
Hamilton Tiger-Cats	18	6	12	0	538	576	12	Details

== CFL playoffs ==
The Toronto Argonauts are the 2012 Grey Cup Champions, winning their 16th title on home turf at the Rogers Centre by defeating the Calgary Stampeders. Argonauts' running back Chad Kackert was named the MVP, while Argonauts' defensive end, Ricky Foley was named the Grey Cup's Most Valuable Canadian.

=== Playoff bracket ===
November 11: Division Semi-Finals
East
W4	Edmonton Eskimos	26
E2	Toronto Argonauts	42
West
W3	Saskatchewan Roughriders	30
W2	Calgary Stampeders	36

November 18: Division Finals
E2	Toronto Argonauts	27
E1	Montreal Alouettes	20
W2	Calgary Stampeders	34
W1	BC Lions	29

November 25: 100th Grey Cup; Rogers Centre – Toronto
E2	Toronto Argonauts	35
W2	Calgary Stampeders	22

== CFL leaders ==
- CFL passing leaders
- CFL rushing leaders
- CFL receiving leaders

== Award winners ==
=== CFL Player of the Week ===
Week	Offensive Player of the Week	Defensive Player of the Week	Special Teams Player of the Week	Outstanding Canadian
One	Darian Durant	J. C. Sherritt	Grant Shaw	Jon Cornish
Two	Brandon Whitaker	Adam Bighill	Larry Taylor	Andrew Harris
Three	Anthony Calvillo	Jerald Brown	Chris Williams	Shea Emry
Four	Henry Burris	Joe Burnett	Justin Palardy	Andy Fantuz
Five	Henry Burris	J. C. Sherritt	Daryl Townsend	Andrew Harris
Six	Brandon Whitaker	Adam Bighill	Sean Whyte	James Yurichuk
Seven	Jon Cornish	J. C. Sherritt	Larry Taylor	Jon Cornish
Eight	Joey Elliott	Alex Hall	Chris Williams	Cauchy Muamba
Nine	S. J. Green	Charleston Hughes	Chris Williams	Jon Cornish
Ten	Chad Owens	Ahmad Carroll	Chris Williams	Jon Cornish
Eleven	Chad Kackert	Jason Vega	Demond Washington	Jon Cornish
Twelve	Travis Lulay	Brock Campbell	Tim Brown	Shawn Gore
Thirteen	Chad Simpson	Adam Bighill	Trent Guy	Henoc Muamba
Fourteen	Henry Burris	Adam Bighill	Trent Guy	Jon Cornish
Fifteen	Joey Elliott	Chris Thompson	Sandro DeAngelis	Andrew Harris
Sixteen	Hugh Charles	Shea Emry	Grant Shaw	Shea Emry
Seventeen	Jamel Richardson	Keon Raymond	Weston Dressler	Jon Cornish
Eighteen	Ricky Ray	Anwar Stewart	Tim Brown	Andre Durie
Nineteen	Henry Burris	J. C. Sherritt	Swayze Waters	Henoc Muamba
Twenty	Drew Tate	Keon Raymond	Chad Owens	Jon Cornish
Twenty-one	Chad Owens	Marcus Ball	Paul McCallum	Jon Cornish

=== CFL Player of the Month ===
Month	Offensive Player of the Month	Defensive Player of the Month	Special Teams Player of the Month	Outstanding Canadian
July	Henry Burris	J. C. Sherritt	Chris Williams	Andrew Harris
August	Anthony Calvillo	J. C. Sherritt	Chris Williams	Jon Cornish
September	Travis Lulay	J. C. Sherritt	Luca Congi	Jon Cornish
October	Fred Stamps	Adam Bighill	Rene Paredes	Jon Cornish

== 2012 CFL All-Stars ==
=== Offence ===
- QB – Anthony Calvillo, Montreal Alouettes
- RB – Jon Cornish, Calgary Stampeders
- RB – Andrew Harris, BC Lions
- R – Nik Lewis, Calgary Stampeders
- R – Weston Dressler, Saskatchewan Roughriders
- R – Chad Owens, Toronto Argonauts
- R – Fred Stamps, Edmonton Eskimos
- OT – Josh Bourke, Montreal Alouettes
- OT – Jovan Olafioye, BC Lions
- OG – Scott Flory, Montreal Alouettes
- OG – Dimitri Tsoumpas, Calgary Stampeders
- OC – Luc Brodeur-Jourdain, Montreal Alouettes

=== Defence ===
- DT – Armond Armstead, Toronto Argonauts
- DT – Bryant Turner, Winnipeg Blue Bombers
- DE – Charleston Hughes, Calgary Stampeders
- DE – Keron Williams, BC Lions
- LB – Adam Bighill, BC Lions
- LB – J. C. Sherritt, Edmonton Eskimos
- LB – Shea Emry, Montreal Alouettes
- CB – Joe Burnett, Edmonton Eskimos
- CB – Pat Watkins, Toronto Argonauts
- DB – Korey Banks, BC Lions
- DB – Ryan Phillips, BC Lions
- S – Kyries Hebert, Montreal Alouettes

=== Special teams ===
- K – Rene Paredes, Calgary Stampeders
- P – Rob Maver, Calgary Stampeders
- ST – Chris Williams, Hamilton Tiger-Cats

== 2012 CFL Western All-Stars ==
=== Offence ===
- QB – Travis Lulay, BC Lions
- RB – Jon Cornish, Calgary Stampeders
- RB – Andrew Harris, BC Lions
- R – Weston Dressler, Saskatchewan Roughriders
- R – Chris Getzlaf, Saskatchewan Roughriders
- R – Nik Lewis, Calgary Stampeders
- R – Fred Stamps, Edmonton Eskimos
- OT – Ben Archibald, BC Lions
- OT – Jovan Olafioye, BC Lions
- OG – Brendon LaBatte, Saskatchewan Roughriders
- OG – Dimitri Tsoumpas, Calgary Stampeders
- OC – Angus Reid, BC Lions

=== Defence ===
- DT – Ted Laurent, Edmonton Eskimos
- DT – Almondo Sewell, Edmonton Eskimos
- DE – Charleston Hughes, Calgary Stampeders
- DE – Keron Williams, BC Lions
- LB – Adam Bighill, BC Lions
- LB – J. C. Sherritt, Edmonton Eskimos
- LB – Juwan Simpson, Calgary Stampeders
- CB – Joe Burnett, Edmonton Eskimos
- CB – Keon Raymond, Calgary Stampeders
- DB – Korey Banks, BC Lions
- DB – Ryan Phillips, BC Lions
- S – Donovan Alexander, Edmonton Eskimos

=== Special teams ===
- K – Rene Paredes, Calgary Stampeders
- P – Rob Maver, Calgary Stampeders
- ST – Tim Brown, BC Lions

== 2012 CFL Eastern All-Stars ==
=== Offence ===
- QB – Anthony Calvillo, Montreal Alouettes
- RB – Avon Cobourne, Hamilton Tiger-Cats
- RB – Chad Simpson, Winnipeg Blue Bombers
- R – S. J. Green, Montreal Alouettes
- R – Chris Matthews, Winnipeg Blue Bombers
- R – Chad Owens, Toronto Argonauts
- R – Chris Williams, Hamilton Tiger-Cats
- OT – Josh Bourke, Montreal Alouettes
- OT – Glenn January, Winnipeg Blue Bombers
- OG – Scott Flory, Montreal Alouettes
- OG – Peter Dyakowski, Hamilton Tiger-Cats
- OC – Luc Brodeur-Jourdain, Montreal Alouettes

=== Defence ===
- DT – Armond Armstead, Toronto Argonauts
- DT – Bryant Turner, Winnipeg Blue Bombers
- DE – John Bowman, Montreal Alouettes
- DE – Alex Hall, Winnipeg Blue Bombers
- LB – Chip Cox, Montreal Alouettes
- LB – Shea Emry, Montreal Alouettes
- LB – Renauld Williams, Hamilton Tiger-Cats
- CB – Pat Watkins, Toronto Argonauts
- CB – Jovon Johnson, Winnipeg Blue Bombers
- DB – Dwight Anderson, Montreal Alouettes
- DB – Jonathan Hefney, Winnipeg Blue Bombers
- S – Kyries Hebert, Montreal Alouettes

=== Special teams ===
- K – Luca Congi, Hamilton Tiger-Cats
- P – Josh Bartel, Hamilton Tiger-Cats
- ST – Chris Williams, Hamilton Tiger-Cats

== 2012 CFLPA All-Stars ==
=== Offence ===
- QB – Travis Lulay, BC Lions
- RB – Jon Cornish, Calgary Stampeders
- RB – Kory Sheets, Saskatchewan Roughriders
- R – Chris Williams, Hamilton Tiger Cats
- R – Weston Dressler, Saskatchewan Roughriders
- R – Chris Matthews, Winnipeg Blue Bombers
- R – Fred Stamps, Edmonton Eskimos
- OT – Josh Bourke, Montreal Alouettes
- OT – Glenn January, Winnipeg Blue Bombers
- OG – Scott Flory, Montreal Alouettes
- OG – Peter Dyakowski, Hamilton Tiger Cats
- OC – Luc Brodeur-Jourdain, Montreal Alouettes

=== Defence ===
- DT – Armond Armstead, Toronto Argonauts
- DT – Almondo Sewell, Edmonton Eskimos
- DE – Charleston Hughes, Calgary Stampeders
- DE – Keron Williams, BC Lions
- LB – Adam Bighill, BC Lions
- LB – J. C. Sherritt, Edmonton Eskimos
- LB – Renauld Williams, Hamilton Tiger Cats
- CB – Dante Marsh, BC Lions
- CB – Keon Raymond, Calgary Stampeders
- DB – Korey Banks, BC Lions
- DB – Jonathan Hefney, Winnipeg Blue Bombers
- S – Kyries Hebert, Montreal Alouettes

=== Special teams ===
- K – Rene Paredes, Calgary Stampeders
- P – Burke Dales, Edmonton Eskimos
- ST – Chris Williams, Hamilton Tiger-Cats

== 2012 Gibson's Finest CFL Awards ==
- CFL's Most Outstanding Player Award – Chad Owens (WR/KR), Toronto Argonauts
- CFL's Most Outstanding Canadian Award – Jon Cornish (RB), Calgary Stampeders
- CFL's Most Outstanding Defensive Player Award – J. C. Sherritt (LB), Edmonton Eskimos
- CFL's Most Outstanding Offensive Lineman Award – Jovan Olafioye (OL), BC Lions
- CFL's Most Outstanding Rookie Award – Chris Matthews (WR), Winnipeg Blue Bombers
- John Agro Special Teams Award – Chris Williams (KR), Hamilton Tiger-Cats
- Tom Pate Memorial Award – Brian Bratton (WR), Montreal Alouettes
- Jake Gaudaur Veterans' Trophy – Graeme Bell (FB) - Saskatchewan Roughriders
- Annis Stukus Trophy – Scott Milanovich, Toronto Argonauts
- Commissioner's Award – Every CFL Player
- Hugh Campbell Distinguished Leadership Award - Brian Williams, CBC, and TSN broadcaster
