= 2011 CFL season =

Canadian Football League season

- Duration: June 30 – November 5, 2011
- East champions: Winnipeg Blue Bombers
- West champions: BC Lions

99th Grey Cup
- Date: November 27, 2011
- Venue: BC Place Stadium, Vancouver
- Champions: BC Lions

CFL seasons
- ← 2010 2012 →

Canadian Football League team locations: West, East

The 2011 CFL season was the 58th season of modern-day Canadian football. Officially, it was the 54th season of the Canadian Football League. The complete schedule was released on February 18 and featured the defending Grey Cup champion Montreal Alouettes opening the season against the visiting BC Lions on Thursday, June 30, 2011. The season was among the most notable in the modern era for the competitiveness of the teams; going into the final week, five teams were tied for first place in the league, a first in modern CFL history. It was also the first time since 1982 that all teams finished with fewer than 12 wins in the regular season. As well, for the first time since 1950, the start of the modern era, all four teams competing in the division finals were different from the four teams that had competed in the division finals the previous year. Newly renovated BC Place Stadium in Vancouver hosted the 99th Grey Cup on November 27, with the hometown Lions defeating the Winnipeg Blue Bombers 34–23 in front of a sold-out crowd.

== CFL news in 2011 ==
=== Touchdown Atlantic ===
The CFL returned to Moncton for the second installment of the Touchdown Atlantic series. The Hamilton Tiger-Cats were the home team, while the Calgary Stampeders were the visitors with the game having taken place on Sunday, September 25.

=== Labour Day Classic twist ===
When the 2011 schedule was released, it was revealed that the typical Labour Day Classic match-up featuring the Hamilton Tiger-Cats hosting the Toronto Argonauts would not occur this year for the first time since 1995. Instead the Tiger-Cats will play host to the Montreal Alouettes and then visit the Alouettes the following week as a part of a home-and-home series. While the fan reaction was heated, Commissioner Mark Cohon explained that due to a lack of available home dates for the Argonauts, Toronto would be hosting a game against the BC Lions that weekend, necessitating the need for the change. This was the ninth time that Hamilton played Montreal on the Labour Day weekend.

=== Rule changes ===
On April 14, 2011, it was announced that four significant rule changes would be introduced for the 2011 season. The following changes were implemented:

- Expanding the use of instant replay on game-changing plays and giving the CFL Command Centre more control over these calls. These include:
  - Awarding possession to the defensive team if they successfully challenged and recovered a loose ball that was fumbled by a quarterback that was originally ruled an incomplete pass.
  - Awarding possession to the defensive team if they successfully challenged and recovered a loose ball that was fumbled by a receiver after a catch that was originally ruled an incomplete pass.
- Eliminating blocking below the waist after a completed pass. This means that the offensive team can only block above the waist of a defender, otherwise it will yield a 10-yard penalty. Blocking below the waist is still permissible on running plays and on plays where the pass is completed behind the line of scrimmage.
- Adding 10 yards to an illegal punt that goes out of bounds. If a punt goes out of bounds in the air (i.e. without bouncing) between the 20-yard lines, the receiving team will have the option of taking the ball where it went out of bounds plus 10 yards or have the kicking team re-kick 10 yards further back from the original line of scrimmage.
- Specifying that if a player is pushed out of bounds by an opponent, he can return to the field and make a play. Originally, the rule did not state that there had to be bodily contact from an opponent.

=== Hall of Fame induction weekend ===
For the third consecutive year, the Canadian Football Hall of Fame induction weekend events took place outside of Hamilton, Ontario, the home of the museum. It took place in Calgary from September 14 to 18, with the hall of fame game itself featuring the Calgary Stampeders hosting the BC Lions on Saturday, September 17, 2011.

=== Salary Cap ===
According to the new collective bargaining agreement, the 2011 salary cap will be set at $4,300,000. As per the agreement, the cap is fixed and will not vary with league revenue performance. The minimum team salary will be set at $3,900,000 with individual minimum salaries set at $43,000.

=== Records and milestones ===
- On July 15, Montreal Alouettes quarterback Anthony Calvillo completed his 395th career touchdown to Eric Deslauriers to move past Damon Allen to become the CFL leader for most touchdown passes.
- On August 4, Anthony Calvillo completed his 5,159th pass completion to Brandon London to move past Damon Allen to become the CFL leader for most pass completions.
- On October 8, BC Lions kicker Paul McCallum kicked his 29th straight field goal to pass the previous record of 28 straight field goals set by Dave Ridgway.
- On October 10, Anthony Calvillo completed a 50-yard touchdown pass to Jamel Richardson to become professional football's all-time leading passer.
- On October 21, Toronto Argonauts wide receiver and kick returner Chad Owens became the first player in professional football to record at least 3,000 combined yards in back to back seasons.
- On October 28, Toronto Argonauts cornerback Byron Parker scored the ninth interception return touchdown of his career, surpassing the previous CFL record of eight shared by Dick Thornton, Malcolm Frank and Jason Goss.
- On November 5, Paul McCallum finished the season with a 94.3% field goal percentage, surpassing the previous record of 90.9% held by Lui Passaglia.

== Regular season ==
=== Structure ===
Teams play eighteen regular season games, playing divisional opponents three or four times and teams from the opposing division twice. Teams are awarded two points for a win and one point for a tie. The top three teams in each division qualify for the playoffs, with the first place team gaining a bye to the divisional finals. A fourth place team may qualify ahead of the third place team in another division (the "Crossover") if they earn more points in the season.

If two or more teams in the same division the following tiebreakers apply:

- a) Most wins in all matches
- b) Head to head winning percentage (matches won divided by all matches played)
- c) Head to head points difference
- d) Head to head points ratio
- e–g) Tiebreakers b–d applied sequentially to divisional games
- h–i) Tiebreakers c–d applied sequentially to all games
- j) Coin toss

Notes:

- 1. If two clubs remain tied after other club(s) are eliminated during any step, tie breakers reverts to step a).
- 2. Tiebreakers do not apply to the Crossover. To cross over a team must have more points than the third place team.

=== Standings ===
Note: GP = Games Played, W = Wins, L = Losses, T = Ties, PF = Points For, PA = Points Against, Pts = Points

Teams in bold are in playoff positions.

West Division
Team	GP	W	L	T	PF	PA	Pts	
**BC Lions**	18	11	7	0	511	385	22	Details
**Edmonton Eskimos**	18	11	7	0	427	401	22	Details
**Calgary Stampeders**	18	11	7	0	511	476	22	Details
Saskatchewan Roughriders	18	5	13	0	346	482	10	Details

East Division
Team	GP	W	L	T	PF	PA	Pts	
**Winnipeg Blue Bombers**	18	10	8	0	432	432	20	Details
**Montreal Alouettes**	18	10	8	0	515	468	20	Details
**Hamilton Tiger-Cats**	18	8	10	0	481	478	16	Details
Toronto Argonauts	18	6	12	0	397	498	12	Details

- BC finished 1st in the West Division because they won the season series over Edmonton (3–1) and Calgary (2–1).
- Edmonton finished 2nd in the West Division because they won the season series over Calgary (2–1).
- Winnipeg finished 1st in the East Division because they won the season series over Montreal (2–1).

== Award winners ==
=== CFL Player of the Week ===
Week	Offensive Player of the Week	Defensive Player of the Week	Special Teams Player of the Week	Outstanding Canadian
One	Jamel Richardson	Alex Suber	Tim Brown	Ian Logan
Two	Anthony Calvillo	Joe Lobendahn	Rene Paredes	Jerome Messam
Three	Brandon Whitaker	Chip Cox	Justin Medlock	Jermaine Reid
Four	Buck Pierce	Greg Peach	Damon Duval	Cory Watson
Five	Chad Kackert	Jonathan Hefney	Paul McCallum	Dave Stala
Six	Anthony Calvillo	Solomon Elimimian	Larry Taylor	Jerome Messam
Seven	Chad Owens	Chip Cox	Sean Whyte	Jabari Arthur
Eight	Arland Bruce	Aaron Hunt	Noel Prefontaine	Chris Getzlaf
Nine	Henry Burris	Joe Lobendahn	Sean Whyte	Johnny Forzani
Ten	Travis Lulay	Jerrell Freeman	Chad Owens	Akeem Foster
Eleven	Anthony Calvillo	Khalif Mitchell	Paul McCallum	Craig Butler
Twelve	Buck Pierce	Chris McKenzie	Noel Prefontaine	Jerome Messam
Thirteen	Brandon Whitaker	Jovon Johnson	Marcus Thigpen	Ricky Foley
Fourteen	Jon Cornish	Charleston Hughes	Adam Bighill	Jon Cornish
Fifteen	Anthony Calvillo	Anwar Stewart	Paul McCallum	Jerome Messam
Sixteen	Cory Boyd	Chip Cox	Paul McCallum	Jon Cornish
Seventeen	Ricky Ray	Jason Vega	Justin Medlock	Jerome Messam
Eighteen	Travis Lulay	Khalif Mitchell	Christopher Milo	Johnny Forzani
Nineteen	Adarius Bowman	Juwan Simpson	Paul McCallum	Andre Durie
Twenty	Anthony Calvillo	Jamall Johnson	Marcus Thigpen	Jon Cornish
Twenty-one	Chris Garrett	Korey Banks	Paul McCallum	Andrew Harris

=== CFL Player of the Month ===
Month	Offensive Player of the Month	Defensive Player of the Month	Special Teams Player of the Month	Outstanding Canadian
July	Ricky Ray	Odell Willis	Justin Medlock	Jerome Messam
August	Henry Burris	Solomon Elimimian	Sean Whyte	Johnny Forzani
September	Brandon Whitaker	Jerrell Freeman	Paul McCallum	Jon Cornish
October	Travis Lulay	Byron Parker	Paul McCallum	Jerome Messam

== CFL playoffs ==
The BC Lions became the first team to win the Grey Cup on home turf since the 1994 BC Lions and became the first ever team to win the championship after starting the season 0–5 by defeating the Winnipeg Blue Bombers, 34–23 at Vancouver's BC Place Stadium. Lions' quarterback Travis Lulay was named the MVP, while Lions' running back, Andrew Harris was named the Grey Cup's Most Valuable Canadian.

=== Playoff bracket ===
November 13: Division Semi-Finals
East
E3	Hamilton Tiger-Cats	52*
E2	Montreal Alouettes	44
West
W3	Calgary Stampeders	19
W2	Edmonton Eskimos	33

November 20: Division Finals
E3	Hamilton Tiger-Cats	3
E1	Winnipeg Blue Bombers	19
W2	Edmonton Eskimos	23
W1	BC Lions	40

November 27: 99th Grey Cup; BC Place Stadium – Vancouver
E1	Winnipeg Blue Bombers	23
W1	BC Lions	34

*-Team won in Overtime.

== CFL leaders ==
- CFL passing leaders
- CFL rushing leaders
- CFL receiving leaders

== 2011 CFL All-Stars ==
=== Offence ===
- QB – Travis Lulay, BC Lions
- RB – Jerome Messam, Edmonton Eskimos
- RB – Brandon Whitaker, Montreal Alouettes
- R – Nik Lewis, Calgary Stampeders
- R – Jamel Richardson, Montreal Alouettes
- R – Geroy Simon, BC Lions
- R – Fred Stamps, Edmonton Eskimos
- OT – Josh Bourke, Montreal Alouettes
- OT – Jovan Olafioye, BC Lions
- OG – Brendon LaBatte, Winnipeg Blue Bombers
- OG – Dimitri Tsoumpas, Calgary Stampeders
- OC – Angus Reid, BC Lions

=== Defence ===
- DT – Aaron Hunt, BC Lions
- DT – Khalif Mitchell, BC Lions
- DE – Justin Hickman, Hamilton Tiger-Cats
- DE – Odell Willis, Winnipeg Blue Bombers
- LB – Chip Cox, Montreal Alouettes
- LB – Solomon Elimimian, BC Lions
- LB – Jerrell Freeman, Saskatchewan Roughriders
- CB – Jovon Johnson, Winnipeg Blue Bombers
- CB – Byron Parker, Toronto Argonauts
- DB – Korey Banks, BC Lions
- DB – Jonathan Hefney, Winnipeg Blue Bombers
- S – Ian Logan, Winnipeg Blue Bombers

=== Special teams ===
- K – Paul McCallum, BC Lions
- P – Burke Dales, Calgary Stampeders
- ST – Chad Owens, Toronto Argonauts

== 2011 CFL Western All-Stars ==
=== Offense ===
- QB – Travis Lulay, BC Lions
- RB – Jon Cornish, Calgary Stampeders
- RB – Jerome Messam, Edmonton Eskimos
- R – Weston Dressler, Saskatchewan Roughriders
- R – Nik Lewis, Calgary Stampeders
- R – Geroy Simon, BC Lions
- R – Fred Stamps, Edmonton Eskimos
- OT – Ben Archibald, BC Lions
- OT – Jovan Olafioye, BC Lions
- OG – Dimitri Tsoumpas, Calgary Stampeders
- OG – Greg Wojt, Edmonton Eskimos
- OC – Angus Reid, BC Lions

=== Defence ===
- DT – Aaron Hunt, BC Lions
- DT – Khalif Mitchell, BC Lions
- DE – Marcus Howard, Edmonton Eskimos
- DE – Keron Williams, BC Lions
- LB – Rod Davis, Edmonton Eskimos
- LB – Solomon Elimimian, BC Lions
- LB – Jerrell Freeman, Saskatchewan Roughriders
- CB – Dante Marsh, BC Lions
- CB – Rod Williams, Edmonton Eskimos
- DB – Korey Banks, BC Lions
- DB – Keon Raymond, Calgary Stampeders
- S – Craig Butler, Saskatchewan Roughriders

=== Special teams ===
- K – Paul McCallum, BC Lions
- P – Burke Dales, Calgary Stampeders
- ST – Larry Taylor, Calgary Stampeders

== 2011 CFL Eastern All-Stars ==
=== Offence ===
- QB – Anthony Calvillo, Montreal Alouettes
- RB – Cory Boyd, Toronto Argonauts
- RB – Brandon Whitaker, Montreal Alouettes
- R – Terrence Edwards, Winnipeg Blue Bombers
- R – S. J. Green, Montreal Alouettes
- R – Jamel Richardson, Montreal Alouettes
- R – Chris Williams, Hamilton Tiger-Cats
- OT – Josh Bourke, Montreal Alouettes
- OT – Glenn January, Winnipeg Blue Bombers
- OG – Scott Flory, Montreal Alouettes
- OG – Brendon LaBatte, Winnipeg Blue Bombers
- OC – Dominic Picard, Toronto Argonauts

=== Defence ===
- DT – Doug Brown, Winnipeg Blue Bombers
- DT – Kevin Huntley, Toronto Argonauts
- DE – Justin Hickman, Hamilton Tiger-Cats
- DE – Odell Willis, Winnipeg Blue Bombers
- LB – Chip Cox, Montreal Alouettes
- LB – Jamall Johnson, Hamilton Tiger-Cats
- LB – Renauld Williams, Hamilton Tiger-Cats
- CB – Byron Parker, Toronto Argonauts
- CB – Jovon Johnson, Winnipeg Blue Bombers
- DB – Jonathan Hefney, Winnipeg Blue Bombers
- DB – Lin-J Shell, Toronto Argonauts
- S – Ian Logan, Winnipeg Blue Bombers

=== Special teams ===
- K – Justin Medlock, Hamilton Tiger-Cats
- P – Noel Prefontaine, Toronto Argonauts
- ST – Chad Owens, Toronto Argonauts

== 2011 Gibson's Finest CFL Awards ==
- CFL's Most Outstanding Player Award – Travis Lulay (QB), BC Lions
- CFL's Most Outstanding Canadian Award – Jerome Messam (RB), Edmonton Eskimos
- CFL's Most Outstanding Defensive Player Award – Jovon Johnson (CB), Winnipeg Blue Bombers
- CFL's Most Outstanding Offensive Lineman Award – Josh Bourke (OT), Montreal Alouettes
- CFL's Most Outstanding Rookie Award – Chris Williams (WR), Hamilton Tiger-Cats
- John Agro Special Teams Award – Paul McCallum (K), BC Lions
- Tom Pate Memorial Award – Kevin Glenn (QB), Hamilton Tiger-Cats
- Jake Gaudaur Veterans' Trophy – Andre Durie (RB/SB), Toronto Argonauts
- Annis Stukus Trophy – Wally Buono, BC Lions
- Commissioner's Award – Larry Reda
- Hugh Campbell Distinguished Leadership Award - no recipient
