= 2008 Calgary Stampeders season =

Canadian football team season

- General manager: John Hufnagel
- Head coach: John Hufnagel
- Home stadium: McMahon Stadium

Results
- Record: 13–5
- Division place: 1st, West
- Playoffs: Won Grey Cup

Uniform

The 2008 Calgary Stampeders season was the 51st season for the team in the Canadian Football League (CFL) and their 70th overall. The Stampeders finished in first place in the West division, won the West Final and played in the 96th Grey Cup in Montreal. The Stampeders defeated the hometown Montreal Alouettes to win their 6th Grey Cup championship.

This season started the following streaks for the Stampeders:

- 14 consecutive seasons above .500 (2008–2022)
- 14 consecutive seasons .500 or better (2008–2022)
- 12 consecutive seasons 10+ wins (2008–2019)

== Offseason ==
=== Transactions ===
- April 24, 2008 – Montreal native Kevin Challenger signed with the Calgary Stampeders on Friday April 25. The former Boston College star was eligible for the NFL Draft but Challenger was ranked number 108 among NCAA receivers. Challenger spent five years at Boston College and was a starter the 2006 and 2007 seasons.
- May 27, 2008 – Calgary Stampeders head coach/GM John Hufnagel traded Duncan Mahony to the Edmonton Eskimos. Calgary received a conditional draft pick for the 31-year-old O'Mahony.

=== CFL draft ===
In the 2008 CFL draft, 48 players were chosen from among 752 eligible players from Canadian universities across the country, as well as Canadian players playing in the NCAA. The first two rounds were broadcast on TSN.ca with host Rod Black.

Round	Pick	Player	Position	School/Club team
1	2	Dimitri Tsoumpas	OL	Weber State
1	3	Jesse Newman	OL	Louisiana-Lafayette
2	16	Fernand Kashama	DE	Western Michigan
3	27	Ronald Hilaire	DL	Buffalo
5	35	Jon Gott	OL	Boise State
6	43	Jonathan Lapointe	FB	Montreal

== Preseason ==
Week	Date	Opponent	Score	Result	Attendance	Record
A	June 13	vs. Edmonton Eskimos	39–14	Win	27,580	1–0
B	June 19	at BC Lions	39–35	Loss	26,242	1–1

== Regular season ==
=== Season standings ===
West Division
Team	GP	W	L	T	PF	PA	Pts	
Calgary Stampeders	18	13	5	0	595	420	26	Details
Saskatchewan Roughriders	18	12	6	0	500	471	24	Details
BC Lions	18	11	7	0	559	479	22	Details
Edmonton Eskimos	18	10	8	0	512	536	20	Details

=== Season schedule ===
Week	Date	Opponent	Score	Result	Attendance	Record
1	June 26	vs. BC Lions	28–18	Win	30,159	1–0
2	July 3	at Edmonton Eskimos	34–31	Loss	32,706	1–1
3	July 10	at Montreal Alouettes	23–19	Win	20,202	2–1
4	July 17	vs. Hamilton Tiger-Cats	43–16	Win	31,116	3–1
5	July 24	at Winnipeg Blue Bombers	32–28	Loss	26,882	3–2
6	August 2	vs. Saskatchewan Roughriders	22–21	Loss	35,650	3–3
7	August 7	at Saskatchewan Roughriders	30–25	Win	28,800	4–3
8	Bye					4–3
9	August 22	at BC Lions	36–29	Win	34,221	5–3
10	September 1	vs. Edmonton Eskimos	37–16	Loss	35,650	5–4
11	September 5	at Edmonton Eskimos	38–33	Win	46,014	6–4
12	September 12	vs. Montreal Alouettes	41–30	Win	30,960	7–4
13	September 20	vs. Toronto Argonauts	34–4	Win	33,135	8–4
14	September 27	at Toronto Argonauts	44–16	Win	29,672	9–4
15	October 3	at Saskatchewan Roughriders	37–34	Loss	30,945	9–5
16	October 13	vs. Saskatchewan Roughriders	42–5	Win	35,650	10–5
17	October 18	vs. Winnipeg Blue Bombers	37–16	Win	30,110	11–5
18	October 24	at Hamilton Tiger Cats	28–17	Win	20,614	12–5
19	November 1	vs. BC Lions	41–30	Win	30,275	13–5

== Roster ==
2008 Calgary Stampeders final roster
Quarterbacks: 1 Henry Burris; 4 Will Proctor; 17 Barrick Nealy; Running backs: 9 Jon Cornish; 21 Joffrey Reynolds; 32 Demetris Summers; Wide receivers: 3 Ryan Thelwell; 11 Brett Ralph; 85 Ken-Yon Rambo; Slotbacks: 80 Jeremaine Copeland; 82 Nik Lewis; 86 Teyo Johnson; 87 Jabari Arthur	Offensive linemen: 60 Derek Armstrong G; 62 Jesse Newman G/T; 64 Jeff Pilon T; 66 Tim O'Neill C/G; 67 Dimitri Tsoumpas G; 68 Rob Lazeo C; Defensive linemen: 39 Charleston Hughes DE; 42 Mike Labinjo DE; 44 Justin Phillips DE; 91 Pat MacDonald DE; 56 Randy Chevrier DT; 93 Howard Hodges DT; 96 Miguel Robédé DT; 97 Eddie Freeman DT	Linebackers: 2 JoJuan Armour; 23 Shannon James; 37 Marc Calixte; 43 Saleem Rasheed; 47 Neil Ternovatsky; 48 Juwan Simpson; Defensive backs: 14 Milt Collins; 27 Brandon Browner; 28 Brandon Smith; 29 Dwaine Carpenter; 31 Wes Lysack; 33 Dwight Anderson; 38 J. R. Ruffin; 88 Markus Howell WR	Special teams: 12 Sandro DeAngelis K; 16 Burke Dales P; Reserve roster: 6 Matt Grootegoed LB; 25 Keon Raymond DB; 58 Antonio Hall T; Practice Roster: 24 Lavarus Giles RB; 34 Funtaine Hunter DE; 49 Jonathan Lapointe RB; 57 Michael Byrne OL; 89 Reggie Williams SB; 94 Marcus Parker DT	Injured list: 4 Julian Battle DB; 7 Ben Sankey QB; 8 Richard Karikari DB; 15 Dave Dickenson QB; 19 Calvin Bannister DB; 26 Rob Cote FB/LB; 35 Lenny Walls DB; 61 Godfrey Ellis G; 65 Ben Archibald T; 69 Fabio Filice G; 71 LeMarcus Rowell LB; 90 Julian Jenkins DT; Suspended: -- Moe Thompson DE; 81 Michael Jennings WR; Italics indicate International player Roster updated 2026-04-13

== Player stats ==
=== Passing ===
Player	Att	Comp	%	Yards	TD	INT	Rating
Henry Burris	591	381	64.5	5093	39	14	103.8
Dave Dickenson	9	5	55.6	79	0	0	85.0
Will Proctor	1	1	100.0	49	0	0	158.3
Barrick Nealy	12	5	41.7	32	0	0	47.9
Jermaine Copeland	1	1	100.0	16	0	0	152.1

=== Rushing ===
Player	Att	Yards	Avg	TD	Fumbles
Joffrey Reynolds	227	1310	5.8	10	4
Henry Burris	87	595	6.8	3	9
Jon Cornish	30	254	8.5	1	0
Demetris Summers	19	121	6.4	1	1
Barrick Nealy	9	112	12.4	3	1

=== Receiving ===
Player	No.	Yards	Avg	Long	TD
Ken-Yon Rambo	100	1473	14.7	81	8
Nikolas Lewis	87	1109	12.7	85	10
Jermaine Copeland	52	763	14.7	60	7

== Awards and records ==
- Henry Burris, Led West Division, Passing Touchdowns (39)
- Henry Burris, Led West Division, Passer Rating (103.8)
- Joffrey Reynolds, CFL Rushing Champion, 1310 Yards
- Joffrey Reynolds, Led CFL, Rushing Attempts (227)
- John Hufnagel, Annis Stukus Trophy winner as the CFL's coach of the year.

=== All-Star Selections ===
- Brandon Browner, Western Division All-Star, Defence
- Henry Burris, Western Division All-Star, Offence
- Sandro DeAngelis, Western Division All-Star, Special Teams
- Rob Lazeo, Western Division All-Star, Offence
- Ken-Yon Rambo, Western Division All-Star, Offence
- Joffrey Reynolds, Western Division All-Star, Offence

== Playoffs ==
Game	Date	Time	Opponent	Score	Result	Attendance
West Final	November 15	2:30 PM MST	vs. BC Lions	22–18	Win	35,650
Grey Cup	November 23	4:00 PM MST	Montreal Alouettes	22–14	Win	66,308

=== West Final ===
Date and time: Saturday, November 15, 2:30 PM Mountain Standard Time
Venue: McMahon Stadium, Calgary, Alberta

Team	Q1	Q2	Q3	Q4	Total
BC Lions	6	6	3	3	18
Calgary Stampeders	0	9	6	7	22

=== Grey Cup ===
Date and time: Sunday, November 23, 4:00 PM Mountain Standard Time
Venue: Olympic Stadium, Montreal, Quebec

Team	Q1	Q2	Q3	Q4	Total
Calgary Stampeders	0	10	6	6	22
Montreal Alouettes	3	10	1	0	14
