= 2007 Calgary Stampeders season =

Canadian football team season

- Head coach: Tom Higgins
- Home stadium: McMahon Stadium

Results
- Record: 7–10–1
- Division place: 3rd, West
- Playoffs: Lost West Semi-Final

Uniform

The 2007 Calgary Stampeders season was the 50th season for the team in the Canadian Football League (CFL) and their 69th overall. After promising second-place finishes in the West Division in 2005 (11–7) and 2006 (10–8) they finished third in the West Division in 2007, with a disappointing 7–10–1 record, their first losing record in three seasons. They were defeated in the Western Semi-Final 26–24 by the eventual Grey Cup champion Saskatchewan Roughriders. The season was the last in which the team recorded more than two consecutive losses in the regular season in 10 years, recording three consecutive losses to close out the 2017 Calgary Stampeders season.

== Offseason ==
=== CFL draft ===
The 2007 CFL draft took place on Wednesday, May 2, 2007, where the Stampeders made eight selections including three in the first round.

Round	Pick	Player	Position	School/Club team
1	3	Mike Gyetvai	OL	Michigan State
1	5	Justin Phillips	LB	Wilfrid Laurier
1	6	Jabari Arthur	WR	Akron
2	14	Kevin Challenger	WR	Boston College
3	21	Patrick MacDonald	DL	Alberta
5	35	Henry Bekkering	K	Eastern Washington
5	38	Ian Hazlett	LB	Queen's
6	45	Greg Hetherington	SB	McGill

== Preseason ==
Week	Date	Opponent	Score	Result	Attendance	Record
B	June 15	vs. Edmonton Eskimos	28–3	Win	25,877	1–0
C	June 22	at Saskatchewan Roughriders	23–21	Loss	28,800	1–1

== Regular season ==
=== Season standings ===
West Division
Pos	Team	Pld	W	L	T	PF	PA	PD	Pts
1	BC Lions (C, Q)	18	14	3	1	542	379	+163	29
2	Saskatchewan Roughriders (Q)	18	12	6	0	530	432	+98	24
3	Calgary Stampeders (Q)	18	7	10	1	473	527	−54	15
4	Edmonton Eskimos	18	5	12	1	399	509	−110	11

Source: "2007 Regular Season Standings". Canadian Football League. Archived from the original on 2008-09-21.
(C) First round bye; (Q) Qualified for playoffs

=== Season schedule ===
Week	Date	Opponent	Score	Result	Attendance	Record
1	June 30	vs. Hamilton Tiger-Cats	37–9	Win	29,157	1–0
2	July 8	at Saskatchewan Roughriders	49–8	Loss	25,862	1–1
3	July 12	at Toronto Argonauts	48–15	Loss	29,304	1–2
4	July 21	vs. Toronto Argonauts	33–10	Win	28,202	2–2
5	July 28	vs. BC Lions	32–27	Loss	28,564	2–3
6	August 4	at Edmonton Eskimos	34–32	Win	32,664	3–3
7	August 9	at Montreal Alouettes	30–18	Loss	20,202	3–4
8	August 17	vs. BC Lions	45–45	Tie	30,826	3–4–1
9	Bye					3–4–1
10	September 3	vs. Edmonton Eskimos	35–24	Win	35,650	4–4–1
11	September 7	at Edmonton Eskimos	20–17	Win	42,329	5–4–1
12	September 15	vs. Saskatchewan Roughriders	44–22	Win	35,650	6–4–1
13	September 21	at Hamilton Tiger-Cats	24–20	Loss	23,115	6–5–1
14	September 29	at BC Lions	42–9	Loss	32,263	6–6–1
15	October 8	vs. Saskatchewan Roughriders	33–21	Loss	33,075	6–7–1
16	October 14	vs. Winnipeg Blue Bombers	38–25	Win	30,897	7–7–1
17	October 19	at Winnipeg Blue Bombers	27–13	Loss	23,955	7–8–1
18	October 27	vs. Montreal Alouettes	33–32	Loss	29,247	7–9–1
19	November 3	at BC Lions	25–24	Loss	34,242	7–10–1

=== Week 1: vs. Hamilton Tiger-Cats ===
	1	2	3	4	Total
Tiger-Cats	3	3	3	0	9
Stampeders	7	10	7	13	37

at McMahon Stadium, Calgary, Alberta

- Kickoff time: 8:00 p.m. MDT
- Attendance: 29,157
- Televised by: CBC

The Stampeders' opened the season with a strong performance, defeating the Hamilton Tiger-Cats 37–9. Quarterback Henry Burris opened the scoring with a 10-yard touchdown pass to Nik Lewis within the first five minutes of the first quarter. In the second quarter Tiger-Cat cornerback Dwight Anderson committed a costly illegal block on a punt return; the penalty resulted in the Tiger-Cat offence being sent back to their own goal line. Tiger-Cat quarterback Jason Maas's pass on the ensuing play was nearly intercepted by Cornelius Anthony. On the following play his pass was caught by Brock Ralph (older brother of Stampeder Brett Ralph) in their end zone, but the ball was knocked from Ralph's hands by Crance Clemons, and halfback Jermaine Chatman picked up the fumble for another Stampeder touchdown. Maas was pulled in the fourth quarter in favour of rookie Timmy Chang, but he was unable to produce more points: the Stampeders defence limited the Tiger-Cats offence to Nick Setta's three field goals.

The game was delayed twice in the second quarter by a rabbit, one of many that roam the University of Calgary campus, that made its way onto the field.

- Video highlights of the game on YouTube

=== Week 2: at Saskatchewan Roughriders ===
	1	2	3	4	Total
Stampeders	8	0	0	0	8
Roughriders	7	18	14	10	49

at Mosaic Stadium at Taylor Field, Regina, Saskatchewan

- Kickoff time: 5:00 p.m. CST
- Attendance: 25,862
- Televised by: TSN

The Stampeders were unable to carry forward any of the momentum from their defeat of the Tiger-Cats the week earlier, as the Roughriders went on to defeat them handily. Henry Burris threw a pass to Joffrey Reynolds for the Stampeders' only touchdown, in the first quarter. The Stampeders led the game 8–7 at the end of the first quarter, but the Roughriders defence smothered the Stampeders offence for the rest of the game. Burris was limited to 12 completions in 25 pass attempts for 124 yards before being replaced by Akili Smith. Smith's efforts were even more futile, completing only 6 passes for 64 yards and throwing an interception.

- Video highlights of the game on YouTube

=== Week 3: at Toronto Argonauts ===
	1	2	3	4	Total
Stampeders	0	0	0	15	15
Argonauts	10	17	14	7	48

at Rogers Centre, Toronto, Ontario

- Kickoff time: 3:00 p.m. EDT
- Attendance: 29,304
- Televised by: TSN

The Stampeders' offensive and defensive woes continued this week, being heavily defeated by the Argonauts. The defence surrendered five touchdowns, five converts and two field goals in the first three quarters, while the offence failed to record a point until punter Burke Dales scored a single at the beginning of the fourth quarter. Henry Burris threw a touchdown to Jeremaine Copeland later in the quarter, but was generally ineffective. Running back Joffrey Reynolds was limited to a paltry 39 yards rushing on 10 carries. Akili Smith replaced Burris in the first half and was again limited to six completed passes while throwing three interceptions, consequently being pulled in favour of Burris.

- Video highlights of the game on YouTube

=== Week 4: vs. Toronto Argonauts ===
	1	2	3	4	Total
Argonauts	0	3	0	7	10
Stampeders	10	3	0	20	33

at McMahon Stadium, Calgary, Alberta

- Kickoff time: 5:00 p.m. MDT
- Attendance: 28,202
- Televised by: CBC

After two miserable losses in Regina and Toronto in the previous two weeks the Stampeders returned home to the confines of McMahon Stadium. Argonaut quarterback Michael Bishop, who had a stellar game the week before, sat out this game due to having broken his wrist. Mike McMahon started in his place. Unlike Bishop, McMahon was unable to generate any points for the Argonauts. He began the game auspiciously throwing incompletions in his first five passing attempts, and could not recover. Veteran Damon Allen replaced him at the start of the second half with the score standing at 13–3 for the Stampeders. The Stampeders padded their lead in the fourth quarter with two Sandro DeAngelis field goals and touchdowns to Marc Boerigter and Trey Young. The latter was thrown by receiver Brett Ralph on a fake field goal play. The Argonauts failed to register any more points until the final play of the game, in which Allen threw a touchdown pass to rookie Obed Cétoute.

- Video highlights of the game on YouTube

=== Week 5: vs. BC Lions ===
	1	2	3	4	Total
Lions	5	6	14	7	32
Stampeders	0	11	0	16	27

at McMahon Stadium, Calgary, Alberta

- Kickoff time: 5:00 p.m. MDT
- Attendance: 28,564
- Televised by: CBC

BC came into this game with a perfect 4–0 record. Starting quarterback Dave Dickenson was out of the lineup with a concussion, and back-up Buck Pierce played with sore ribs, but the Stampeders were unable to stop the potent Lions offence while unable to generate their own. The Stamps finished the first quarter with a measly 21 yards of offence. They regained composure in the second quarter, scoring 11 points to tie the game before the end of the half. Sandro DeAngelis missed a 46-yard field goal attempt with 10 seconds remaining in the half. Unfortunately for the Stampeders they allowed the Lions to retake control of the game in the third quarter with two touchdowns. Henry Burris threw several key interceptions, among them one to Korey Banks in the Lions' end zone in the third quarter on a play which would have tied the game and another to LaVar Glover in the fourth quarter, giving the Lions excellent field position to score the winning touchdown.

With the loss the Stampeders fell to last place in the West Division, one point behind the Eskimos.

- Video highlights of the game on YouTube

=== Week 6: at Edmonton Eskimos ===
	1	2	3	4	Total
Stampeders	3	14	7	10	34
Eskimos	1	14	7	10	32

at Commonwealth Stadium, Edmonton, Alberta

- Kickoff time: 5:00 p.m. MDT
- Attendance: 32,644
- Televised by: CBC

The Stampeders and Eskimos offences started off this game quite poorly, managing to produce only a field goal and a single, respectively, in the first quarter. The Stampeders scored the first touchdown in the second quarter on a pass from Henry Burris to Brett Ralph. Eskimo kicker Sean Fleming kicked a field goal, a single on the ensuing kickoff, and another field goal in the span of 3:33 to keep the game close. Burris threw another touchdown late in the quarter to Jeremaine Copeland after penalties to the Eskimos (A.J. Gass and Kenny Onatolu were ejected) gave them excellent field position, but the Eskimos responded with a touchdown of their own, a pass from Ricky Ray to Tyler Ebell, before the end of the half. The Eskimos took the lead in the third quarter on a touchdown pass to Kamau Peterson, but Sandro DeAngelis regained the Stampeders' lead with a field goal and a single. Joffrey Reynolds ran into the end zone for another touchdown to solidify the slim lead, but another touchdown pass to Peterson and field goal by Fleming gave the Eskimos a 32–31 lead with only 1:38 left in the game. The Eskimos had been in excellent position to score a touchdown after a roughing the kicker penalty put them only 13 yards from the Stampeders end zone with a 1st down, but they were unable to score the major and resorted to Fleming's field goal. The inability to score a touchdown in that key moment may have cost the Eskimos the game, as it left the Stampeders in the position to take the lead and win the game with only a safety or field goal. After a final drive to the Eskimos end zone in the last minute of the game the Stampeders offence set up DeAngelis for a 34-yard field goal attempt with no time left. DeAngelis's attempt was good, and the Stampeders won the game 34–32.

- Video highlights of the game on YouTube

=== Week 7: at Montreal Alouettes ===
	1	2	3	4	Total
Stampeders	1	7	3	7	18
Alouettes	1	21	1	7	30

at Percival Molson Memorial Stadium, Montreal, Quebec

- Kickoff time: 7:30 p.m. EDT
- Attendance: 20,202
- Televised by: TSN, RDS
- Video highlights of the game on YouTube

=== Week 8: vs. BC Lions ===
	1	2	3	4	OT	Total
Lions	7	14	7	3	14	45
Stampeders	10	7	7	7	14	45

at McMahon Stadium, Calgary, Alberta

- Kickoff time: 8:00 p.m. MDT
- Attendance: 30,826
- Televised by: TSN
- Video highlights of the game on YouTube

=== Week 10: vs. Edmonton Eskimos ===
	1	2	3	4	Total
Eskimos	8	13	0	3	24
Stampeders	7	8	14	6	35

at McMahon Stadium, Calgary, Alberta

- Kickoff time: 2:00 p.m. MDT
- Attendance: 35,650
- Televised by: CBC
- Video highlights of the game on YouTube

=== Week 11: at Edmonton Eskimos ===
	1	2	3	4	Total
Stampeders	0	6	14	0	20
Eskimos	10	3	1	3	17

at Commonwealth Stadium, Edmonton, Alberta

- Kickoff time: 7:00 p.m. MDT
- Attendance: 42,329
- Televised by: TSN
- Video highlights of the game on YouTube

=== Week 12: vs. Saskatchewan Roughriders ===
	1	2	3	4	Total
Roughriders	1	7	7	7	22
Stampeders	7	21	10	6	44

at McMahon Stadium, Calgary, Alberta

- Kickoff time: 2:00 p.m. MDT
- Attendance: 35,650
- Televised by: TSN
- Video highlights of the game on YouTube

=== Week 13: at Hamilton Tiger-Cats ===
	1	2	3	4	Total
Stampeders	7	10	1	2	20
Tiger-Cats	0	9	4	11	24

at Ivor Wynne Stadium, Hamilton, Ontario

- Kickoff time: 7:30 p.m. EDT
- Attendance: 23,115
- Televised by: TSN
- Video highlights of the game on YouTube

=== Week 14: at BC Lions ===
	1	2	3	4	Total
Stampeders	1	3	0	5	9
Lions	14	7	7	14	42

at BC Place Stadium, Vancouver, British Columbia

- Kickoff time: 7:00 p.m. PDT
- Attendance: 32,263
- Televised by: CBC
- Video highlights of the game on YouTube

=== Week 15: vs. Saskatchewan Roughriders ===
	1	2	3	4	Total
Roughriders	6	16	7	4	33
Stampeders	0	7	7	7	21

at McMahon Stadium, Calgary, Alberta

- Kickoff time: 2:00 p.m. MDT
- Attendance: 33,075
- Televised by: CBC
- Video highlights of the game on YouTube

=== Week 16: vs. Winnipeg Blue Bombers ===
	1	2	3	4	Total
Blue Bombers	0	8	10	7	25
Stampeders	7	10	14	7	38

at McMahon Stadium, Calgary, Alberta

- Kickoff time: 2:00 p.m. MDT
- Attendance: 30,897
- Televised by: TSN
- Video highlights of the game on YouTube

=== Week 17: at Winnipeg Blue Bombers ===
	1	2	3	4	Total
Stampeders	0	6	0	7	13
Blue Bombers	7	3	2	15	27

at Canad Inns Stadium, Winnipeg, Manitoba

- Kickoff time: 7:00 p.m. CDT
- Attendance: 23,955
- Televised by: TSN
- Video highlights of the game on YouTube

=== Week 18: vs. Montreal Alouettes ===
	1	2	3	4	Total
Alouettes	10	14	6	3	33
Stampeders	7	12	3	10	32

at McMahon Stadium, Calgary, Alberta

- Kickoff time: 5:00 p.m. MDT
- Attendance: 29,247
- Televised by: TSN
- Video highlights of the game on YouTube

=== Week 19: at BC Lions ===
	1	2	3	4	Total
Stampeders	7	10	0	7	24
Lions	9	3	13	0	25

at BC Place Stadium, Vancouver, British Columbia

- Kickoff time: 7:00 p.m. PDT
- Attendance: 34,242
- Televised by: TSN
- Video highlights of the game on YouTube

== Postseason ==
=== Schedule ===
Game	Date	Time	Opponent	Score	Result	Attendance
West Semi-Final	Nov 13	3:00 PM MST	at Saskatchewan Roughriders	26–24	Loss	28,800

=== Western Semi-Final ===
Team	Q1	Q2	Q3	Q4	Total
Calgary Stampeders	0	7	10	7	24
Saskatchewan Roughriders	13	6	3	4	26

The Saskatchewan Roughriders rode the foot of Luca Congi and the arm and legs of Kerry Joseph to a 26–24 victory over the Calgary Stampeders at Mosaic Stadium at Taylor Field. Congi matched a season high and tied a league playoff record with six field goals, while Joseph passed for 395 yards and added another 108 on the ground in the first playoff game in Regina in 19 years.

== Roster ==
2007 Calgary Stampeders final roster
Quarterbacks: 1 Henry Burris; 15 Barrick Nealy; 14 Ben Sankey; Running backs: 45 Gerald Commissiong; 9 Jon Cornish; 26 Rob Cote; 24 Ken Simonton; Receivers: 80 Jeremaine Copeland; 88 Markus Howell; 82 Nik Lewis; 11 Brett Ralph; 85 Ken-Yon Rambo; 3 Ryan Thelwell; 87 J. R. Tolver	Offensive linemen: 62 John Comiskey C/G; 69 Dave Costa T; 61 Godfrey Ellis T; 68 Rob Lazeo G/C; 50 Jay McNeil G; 64 Jeff Pilon T; 52 Bobby Singh G; Defensive linemen: 76 Randy Chevrier DT; 97 Eddie Freeman DT; 77 Tearrius George DE; 49 Pat MacDonald DE; 94 Marcus Parker DT; 93 Terrence Patrick DE; 97 Keron Williams DT	Linebackers: 37 Marc Calixte; 56 Scott Coe; 6 Matt Grootegoed; 23 Shannon James; 47 Neil Ternovatsky; Defensive backs: 4 Julian Battle; 27 Brandon Browner; 29 Dwaine Carpenter; 32 Crance Clemons; 31 Wes Lysack; 41 Sean Manning; 30 Sadrick Williams; 33 Trey Young; Special teams: 12 Sandro DeAngelis K; 2 Duncan O'Mahony P	Reserve roster: 48 Brian Clark LB; 16 Burke Dales P; 32 Joffrey Reynolds RB; Injured list: 8 Cornelius Anthony LB; 19 Calvin Bannister DB; 92 Anthony Gargiulo DE; 35 Cory Hathaway FB; 66 Garrick Jones T; 42 Mike Labinjo DE; 44 Justin Phillips DE; 96 Miguel Robédé DT; 95 Robert Rodriguez LB; 28 J. R. Ruffin DB; Suspended: Stephen Bell T; John Syptak DE; Italics indicate International player

== Statistics ==
=== Passing ===
Note: Att = Attempts; Comp = Completions; % = Completions/Attempts; Avg = Yards/Completion; Long = Longest Completion (in yards); Int = Interceptions; TD = Touchdowns

Player	Att	Comp	%	Yards	Avg	Long	Int	TD
Henry Burris	471	285	60.5	4279	15.0	85	14	34
Ben Sankey	90	62	68.9	818	13.2	50	2	5
Akili Smith	47	22	46.8	219	10.0	21	5	0
Barrick Nealy	17	5	29.4	91	18.2	34	0	0
Brett Ralph	2	1	50.0	39	39.0	39	0	1
Jeremaine Copeland	2	0	0.0	0	0.0	0	0	0

=== Receiving ===
Note: Rec = Receptions; Avg = Yards/Reception; Long = Longest Reception (yards); TD = Touchdowns

Player	Rec	Yards	Avg	Long	TD
Jeremaine Copeland	67	1110	16.6	84	10
Nik Lewis	67	1101	16.4	85	5
Ken-Yon Rambo	62	983	15.9	57	10
Ryan Thelwell	40	733	18.3	70	4
Brett Ralph	53	695	13.1	39	3
Joffrey Reynolds	49	336	6.9	18	3
Marc Boerigter	16	246	15.4	70	1
Rob Cote	11	112	10.2	21	2
J. R. Tolver	1	47	47.0	47	0
Trey Young	1	39	39.0	39	1
Ken Simonton	4	33	8.3	16	0
Markus Howell	1	8	8.0	8	0
Gerald Commissiong	2	2	1.0	5	0
Randy Chevrier	1	1	1.0	1	1

=== Rushing ===
Note: Avg = Yards/Carry; Long = Longest Carry (yards); TD = Touchdowns

Player	Carries	Yards	Avg	Long	TD
Joffrey Reynolds	214	1231	5.8	46	2
Henry Burris	85	623	7.3	39	5
Ken Simonton	18	114	6.3	33	1
Gerald Commissiong	18	64	3.6	16	0
Barrick Nealy	7	50	7.1	16	0
Ben Sankey	6	34	5.7	21	0
Jon Cornish	1	30	30.0	18	0
Brett Ralph	5	30	6.0	24	0
Markus Howell	1	17	17.0	17	0
Akili Smith	4	16	4.0	8	0
Duncan O'Mahony	1	5	5.0	5	0
Rob Cote	2	3	1.5	3	0
Nik Lewis	1	0	0.0	0	0
Jeremaine Copeland	1	−5	−5.0	0	0

=== Kicking ===
Note: Att = Attempted field goals; Good = Good field goals; Avg = Yards/kick; Long = Longest kick (yards); KO = Kickoffs; Sing = Singles

	Field goals						Kickoffs				
Player	Att	Good	Yards	Avg	Long	Sing	KO	Yards	Avg	Long	Sing
Sandro DeAngelis	35	30	850	28.3	48	2	76	4586	60.3	86	1
Duncan O'Mahony	1	0	0	0.0	0	0	–	–	–	–	–

=== Punting ===
Player	Punts	Yards	Avg	Long	RetYds	NetYds	NetAvg	Sing
Burke Dales	72	3218	44.7	80	370	2751	38.2	4
Duncan O'Mahony	51	2158	42.3	65	306	1773	34.8	3

=== Defence ===
Note: DTkl = Defensive Tackles; STTkl = Special Teams Tackles; TotTkl = Total Tackles; Int = Interceptions; IntTD = Touchdowns on interceptions; FumR = Fumble Recoveries; Forced = Forced fumbles; FumTD = Touchdowns on fumbles; KD = Knock Downs

Player	DTkl	STTkl	TotTkl	Sacks	Int	IntTD	FumR	Forced	FumTD	KD
Trey Young	69	8	77	0	4	0	3	1	1	2
Brandon Browner	55	16	71	1	1	1	0	4	0	5
Shannon James	60	7	67	4	2	0	0	1	0	5
Cornelius Anthony	56	4	60	8	0	0	1	2	0	5
Scott Coe	56	4	60	1	0	0	2	3	0	3
Dwaine Carpenter	46	12	58	0	0	0	2	1	0	4
Brian Clark	44	4	48	1	1	0	1	0	0	2
Terrence Patrick	41	0	41	0	0	0	2	1	0	1
Tearrius George	33	1	34	8	0	0	1	1	0	0
Crance Clemons	30	0	30	0	1	0	0	3	0	5
Keron Williams	28	0	28	6	0	0	2	2	0	1
Randy Chevrier	15	12	27	2	0	0	1	1	0	1
Anthony Gargiulo	21	0	21	5	0	0	1	1	0	0
Julian Battle	20	0	20	1	1	0	0	0	0	1
Matt Grootegoed	0	20	20	0	0	0	0	2	0	0
J. R. Ruffin	19	0	19	0	0	0	0	0	0	1
Calvin Bannister	17	2	19	0	2	0	0	0	0	3
Marc Calixte	5	12	17	0	0	0	0	1	0	0
Sadrick Williams	16	0	16	0	1	0	0	0	0	1
Jon Cornish	0	15	15	0	0	0	0	0	0	0
Jermaine Chatman	11	0	11	0	0	0	1	0	1	1
Rob Cote	2	7	9	0	0	0	0	0	0	0
Brett Ralph	7	1	8	0	0	0	0	0	0	0
Wes Lysack	2	6	8	0	0	0	0	0	0	0
Neil Ternovatsky	6	1	7	0	0	0	0	0	0	0
Tony Bua	6	0	6	0	0	0	0	0	0	0
Justin Phillips	5	1	6	0	0	0	0	0	0	1
Shannon Garrett	4	2	6	0	0	0	0	0	0	1
Mike Labinjo	2	4	6	0	0	0	0	0	0	0
John Syptak	4	1	5	1	0	0	0	0	0	0
Jeremaine Copeland	4	0	4	0	0	0	0	0	0	0
Pat MacDonald	4	0	4	1	0	0	0	0	0	0
Gerald Commissiong	0	4	4	0	0	0	0	0	0	0
Brandon Haw	3	0	3	0	0	0	0	0	0	0
Garrick Jones	3	0	3	0	0	0	0	0	0	0
Nik Lewis	3	0	3	0	0	0	0	0	0	0
Ryan Thelwell	3	0	3	0	0	0	0	0	0	0
Marc Boerigter	2	0	2	0	0	0	0	0	0	0
John Comiskey	2	0	2	0	0	0	0	0	0	0
Eddie Freeman	2	0	2	1	0	0	1	0	0	0
Rob Lazeo	2	0	2	0	0	0	0	0	0	0
Marcus Parker	2	0	2	1	0	0	0	0	0	0
Ken-Yon Rambo	2	0	2	0	0	0	0	0	0	0
Brandon Stewart	2	0	2	0	0	0	0	0	0	0
Sandro DeAngelis	0	2	2	0	0	0	0	0	0	0
Markus Howell	0	2	2	0	0	0	0	0	0	0
Sean Manning	0	2	2	0	0	0	0	0	0	0
Lamont Brightful	1	0	1	0	0	0	0	0	0	0
Henry Burris	1	0	1	0	0	0	0	0	0	0
Jay McNeil	1	0	1	0	0	0	0	0	0	0
Demetrious Maxie	1	0	1	0	0	0	0	0	0	0
Jeff Pilon	1	0	1	0	0	0	0	0	0	0
Joffrey Reynolds	1	0	1	0	0	0	0	0	0	0
Robert Rodriguez	1	0	1	0	0	0	0	0	0	0
Burke Dales	0	1	1	0	0	0	0	0	0	0

== Awards and records ==
=== 2007 CFL All-Stars ===
- None
