= 2009 Calgary Stampeders season =

Canadian football team season

- General manager: John Hufnagel
- Head coach: John Hufnagel
- Home stadium: McMahon Stadium

Results
- Record: 10–7–1
- Division place: 2nd, West
- Playoffs: Lost West Final

Uniform

The 2009 Calgary Stampeders season was the 52nd season for the team in the Canadian Football League (CFL) and their 71st overall. The Stampeders attempted to repeat as Grey Cup champions.

The Stampeders finished in second place with a 10–7–1 record. They appeared in the West Final but lost to the Saskatchewan Roughriders.

== Offseason ==
=== CFL draft ===
The 2009 CFL draft took place on May 2, 2009. The Stampeders selected safety Eric Fraser of Central Michigan University in the first round, eighth overall.

Round	Pick	Player	Position	School/Club team
1	8	Eric Fraser	S	Central Michigan
2	16	Tristan Black	LB	Wayne State
3	24	John Hashem	OT	Regina
4	28	Spencer Armstrong	WR	Air Force
4	30	Steve Myddelton	DE	St. Francis Xavier
4	32	Scott McHenry	SB	Saskatchewan
5	40	Osie Ukwuoma	DL	Queen's
6	48	John Kanaroski	WR	Regina

== Preseason ==
Week	Date	Opponent	Score	Result	Attendance	Record
A	June 17	vs. BC Lions	37-30	Win	25,463	1–0
B	June 23	at Saskatchewan Roughriders	27-19	Win	29,107	2–0

== Regular season ==
=== Season standings ===
West Division
Team	GP	W	L	T	PF	PA	Pts	
Saskatchewan Roughriders	18	10	7	1	514	484	21	Details
Calgary Stampeders	18	10	7	1	514	443	21	Details
Edmonton Eskimos	18	9	9	0	469	502	18	Details
BC Lions	18	8	10	0	431	502	16	Details

=== Season schedule ===
Week	Date	Opponent	Score	Result	Attendance	Record
1	July 1	vs. Montreal Alouettes	40 – 27	Loss	35,650	0 - 1
2	July 10	at Winnipeg Blue Bombers	42 – 30	Loss	29,533	0 - 2
3	July 17	vs. Toronto Argonauts	44 – 9	Win	33,109	1 - 2
4	July 24	at BC Lions	48 – 10	Win	27,191	2 - 2
5	August 1	vs. Saskatchewan Roughriders	24 – 23	Loss	35,650	2 - 3
6	August 8	vs. Winnipeg Blue Bombers	31 – 23	Win	35,650	3 - 3
7	August 13	at Edmonton Eskimos	38 – 35	Loss	33,065	3 - 4
8	Bye					3 - 4
9	August 28	at Toronto Argonauts	23 – 20	Win	25,329	4 - 4
10	Sept 7	vs. Edmonton Eskimos	32 – 8	Win	40,729	5 - 4
11	Sept 11	at Edmonton Eskimos	35 – 34	Win	46,212	6 - 4
12	Sept 18	at Hamilton Tiger-Cats	24 – 17	Loss	19,448	6 - 5
13	Sept 25	vs. BC Lions	27 – 18	Win	36,702	7 - 5
14	Oct 3	vs. Hamilton Tiger-Cats	15 – 14	Win	36,753	8 - 5
15	Oct 12	at Montreal Alouettes	32 – 11	Loss	20,202	8 - 6
16	Oct 17	vs. Saskatchewan Roughriders	44 – 44 (2OT)	Tie	38,623	8 - 6 - 1
17	Oct 23	vs. Edmonton Eskimos	30 – 7	Win	35,650	9 - 6 - 1
18	Oct 31	at BC Lions	28 – 26	Win	27,131	10 - 6 - 1
19	Nov 6	at Saskatchewan Roughriders	30 – 14	Loss	30,945	10 - 7 - 1

== Roster ==
2009 Calgary Stampeders final roster
Quarterbacks: 1 Henry Burris; 17 Barrick Nealy; 4 Drew Tate; Running backs: 9 Jon Cornish; 26 Rob Cote; 21 Joffrey Reynolds; 32 Demetris Summers; Receivers: 83 Romby Bryant; 80 Jeremaine Copeland; 87 Arjei Franklin; 88 Markus Howell; 2 Teyo Johnson; 82 Nik Lewis; 11 Brett Ralph	Offensive linemen: 65 Ben Archibald T; 61 Godfrey Ellis T/G; 62 Jesse Newman G; 66 Tim O'Neill G/C; 64 Jeff Pilon T; 67 Dimitri Tsoumpas G; Defensive linemen: 95 DeVone Claybrooks DT; 99 Jim Davis DT; 91 Tearrius George DE; 39 Charleston Hughes DE; 77 Tom Johnson DT; 34 Fernand Kashama DE; 44 Justin Phillips DE; 96 Miguel Robédé DT; 98 Odell Willis DE	Linebackers: 37 Marc Calixte; 49 Malik Jackson; 23 Shannon James; 0 Tim Johnson; Defensive backs: 33 Dwight Anderson; 27 Brandon Browner; 7 Dwaine Carpenter; 14 Milt Collins; 29 John Eubanks; 31 Wes Lysack; 25 Keon Raymond; Special teams: 56 Randy Chevrier LS; 16 Burke Dales P; 12 Sandro DeAngelis K	Reserve roster: 63 Jon Gott G; 89 Jermaine Jackson SB; 42 Mike Labinjo DE; 48 Juwan Simpson LB; Practice Roster: 57 Michael Byrne OL; 84 Chris Davis WR; -- Michael Desormeaux QB; 81 Blaine Kruger WR; -- Deon Murphy WR; 15 Maurice Price WR; -- Vince Redd DE; 38 Dee Webb DB	Injured list: 35 Ronnie Amadi DB; 60 Derek Armstrong G; 47 Tristan Black LB; 45 Mike Botterill LB; 86 Jackie Chambers SB; 97 Alain Kashama DE; 68 Rob Lazeo C; 59 Steve Myddelton G; 85 Ken-Yon Rambo WR; 71 LeMarcus Rowell LB; 38 J. R. Ruffin DB; 28 Brandon Smith DB; 3 Ryan Thelwell WR; 43 Derek Watson RB; Suspended: Kenny King DT; Italics indicate American player Roster updated 2026-04-13

== Player stats ==
=== Passing ===
Player	Att	Comp	%	Yards	TD	INT	Rating
Henry Burris	571	339	59.4	4,831	22	16	88.0
Drew Tate	11	9	81.8	78	0	0	99.8
Barrick Nealy	10	6	60.0	72	2	0	148.8

=== Rushing ===
Player	Att	Yards	Avg	TD	Fumbles
Joffrey Reynolds	235	1,504	6.4	11	3
Henry Burris	105	552	5.3	11	8
Jon Cornish	20	105	5.3	2	0
Demetris Summers	8	67	8.4	24	0
Barrick Nealy	6	33	5.5	15	0

=== Receiving ===
Player	No.	Yards	Avg	Long	TD
Jermaine Copeland	81	1,235	15.2	57	12
Nik Lewis	70	1,013	14.5	52	1
Romby Bryant	27	548	20.3	53	0
Ryan Thelwell	31	492	15.9	45	1
Joffrey Reynolds	36	431	12.0	37	2

== Awards and records ==
=== 2009 CFL All-Stars ===
- OT – Ben Archibald
- CB – Brandon Browner
- WR – Jeremaine Copeland
- RB – Joffrey Reynolds

== Playoffs ==
=== Schedule ===
Week	Date	Time	Opponent	Score	Result	Attendance
20	November 15	2:30 PM MST	vs. Edmonton Eskimos	24-21	Win	31,356
21	November 22	2:30 PM MST	at Saskatchewan Roughriders	27-11	Loss	30,945

=== Bracket ===
November 15: Division Semifinals
East
W4	BC Lions	34*
E2	Hamilton Tiger-Cats	27
West
W3	Edmonton Eskimos	21
W2	Calgary Stampeders	24

November 22: Division Finals
W4	BC Lions	18
E1	Montreal Alouettes	56
W2	Calgary Stampeders	17
W1	Saskatchewan Roughriders	27

November 29: 97th Grey Cup; McMahon Stadium – Calgary
E1	Montreal Alouettes	28
W1	Saskatchewan Roughriders	27

*-Team won in Overtime.

=== West Semi-Final ===
Date and time: Sunday, November 15, 2:30 PM Mountain Standard Time
Venue: McMahon Stadium, Calgary, Alberta

Team	Q1	Q2	Q3	Q4	Total
Edmonton Eskimos	0	7	7	7	21
Calgary Stampeders	0	9	7	8	24

=== West Final ===
Date and time: Sunday, November 22, 2:30 PM Mountain Standard Time
Venue: Mosaic Stadium, Regina, Saskatchewan

Team	Q1	Q2	Q3	Q4	Total
Calgary Stampeders	3	7	1	6	17
Saskatchewan Roughriders	0	10	14	3	27
