= 2006 Calgary Stampeders season =

Canadian Football League

- Head coach: Tom Higgins
- Home stadium: McMahon Stadium

Results
- Record: 10–8
- Division place: 2nd, West
- Playoffs: Lost West Semi-Final

Uniform

The 2006 Calgary Stampeders season was the 49th season for the team in the Canadian Football League (CFL) and their 68th overall. The Stampeders finished second place in the West division with a 10–8 record. They appeared in the West Semi-Final where they lost to the Saskatchewan Roughriders.

== Offseason ==
=== CFL draft ===
Round	Pick	Player	Position	School/Club team
2	13	Jon Cornish	RB	Kansas
4	27	Riley Clayton	OL	Manitoba
4	30	Gerald Commissiong	RB	Stanford
5	38	Derek Armstrong	OL	St. Francis Xavier
6	44	Andre Knights	DB	Saint Mary's
6	46	Marc Trepanier	LB	Montreal

=== Preseason ===
Week	Date	Opponent	Score	Result	Attendance	Record
A	June 2	at BC Lions	26–23	Win	23,154	1–0
B	June 8	vs. BC Lions	57–13	Loss	7,335	1–1

== Regular season ==
=== Season standings ===
West Division
Pos	Team	Pld	W	L	T	PF	PA	PD	Pts
1	BC Lions (Q)	18	13	5	0	555	355	+200	26
2	Calgary Stampeders (Q)	18	10	8	0	477	426	+51	20
3	Saskatchewan Roughriders (Q)	18	9	9	0	465	434	+31	18
4	Edmonton Eskimos	18	7	11	0	399	468	−69	14

Source: "2006 Regular Season Standings". Canadian Football League. Archived from the original on 2008-09-21.
(Q) Qualified for playoffs

=== Season schedule ===
Week	Date	Opponent	Score	Result	Attendance	Record
1	June 17	vs. Edmonton Eskimos	24–14	Win	25,895	1–0
2	June 24	at Edmonton Eskimos	18–14	Loss	40,491	1–1
3	June 29	vs. Hamilton Tiger-Cats	23–22	Win	28,396	2–1
4	July 8	at Saskatchewan Roughriders	53–36	Win	23,942	3–1
5	July 14	at Hamilton Tiger-Cats	20–17	Loss	26,944	3–2
6	July 21	vs. BC Lions	43–20	Loss	31,210	3–3
7	July 29	at Saskatchewan Roughriders	19–9	Loss	23,107	3–4
8	August 5	vs. Saskatchewan Roughriders	23–7	Win	34,319	4–4
9	August 12	vs. Montreal Alouettes	27–24	Win	29,452	5–4
10	Bye					5–4
11	August 24	at Montreal Alouettes	41–23	Win	20,202	6–4
12	September 4	vs. Edmonton Eskimos	44–23	Win	35,744	7–4
13	September 8	at Edmonton Eskimos	35–26	Loss	47,965	7–5
14	September 15	vs. Winnipeg Blue Bombers	43–9	Win	26,843	8–5
15	September 23	vs. Toronto Argonauts	39–18	Win	31,539	9–5
16	September 30	at Toronto Argonauts	23–16	Loss	32,410	9–6
17	October 6	at BC Lions	39–13	Loss	32,232	9–7
18	October 15	vs. BC Lions	32–25	Win	33,546	10–7
19	October 21	at Winnipeg Blue Bombers	28–13	Loss	30,092	10–8
20	Bye					10–8

== Playoffs ==
=== Schedule ===
Game	Date	Time	Opponent	Score	Result	Attendance
West Semi-Final	Nov 5	2:00 PM MST	vs. Saskatchewan Roughriders	30–21	Loss	35,650

=== West Semi-Final ===
Team	Q1	Q2	Q3	Q4	Total
Saskatchewan Roughriders	3	9	8	10	30
Calgary Stampeders	4	17	0	0	21

== Roster ==
2006 Calgary Stampeders final roster
Quarterbacks: 1 Henry Burris; 4 David Corley; 14 Danny McManus; Running backs: 25 Wes Cates; 32 Joffrey Reynolds; Receivers: 80 Jeremaine Copeland; 88 Markus Howell; 83 Ron Johnson; 82 Nik Lewis; 11 Brett Ralph; 85 Ken-Yon Rambo; 84 Elijah Thurmon; 81 Beau Gibbs	Offensive linemen: 62 John Comiskey G/C; 61 Godfrey Ellis C; 66 Alexandre Gauthier T; 58 Tyler Lynem T; 50 Jay McNeil G; 64 Jeff Pilon T; 65 Taylor Robertson G; Defensive linemen: 53 Rahim Abdullah DE; 76 Randy Chevrier DT; 91 Demetrious Maxie DE; 92 Sheldon Napastuk DT; 93 Terrence Patrick DE; 96 Miguel Robédé DT; Special teams: 16 Burke Dales P; 12 Sandro DeAngelis K	Linebackers: 42 Khalid Abdullah; 37 Marc Calixte; 48 Brian Clark; 56 Scott Coe; 39 Marc Mitchell; 95 Robert Rodriguez; 45 Walter Spencer; Defensive backs: 26 Crance Clemons; 43 Brandon Haw; 31 Wes Lysack; 9 Pascal Masson; 3 Coby Rhinehart; 28 J. R. Ruffin; 29 Tony Tiller	Reserve roster: 8 Cornelius Anthony LB; 60 Derek Armstrong G; 7 John Grace LB; 33 Trey Young DB; Injured list: 41 Jermaine Chatman DB; 54 Riley Clayton G; 23 Shannon James LB; 34 Gilles Lezi FB; 97 Keron Williams DE; 30 Sadrick Williams DB; 44 Cam Yeow LB; Suspended: 42 Shane Walton DB; Italics indicate International player

== Awards and records ==
=== 2006 CFL All-Stars ===
- LB – Brian Clark
- K – Sandro DeAngelis
- OG – Jay McNeil
- RB – Joffrey Reynolds
- CB – Coby Rhinehart
