= Jim Barker =

Canadian football coach (born 1956)

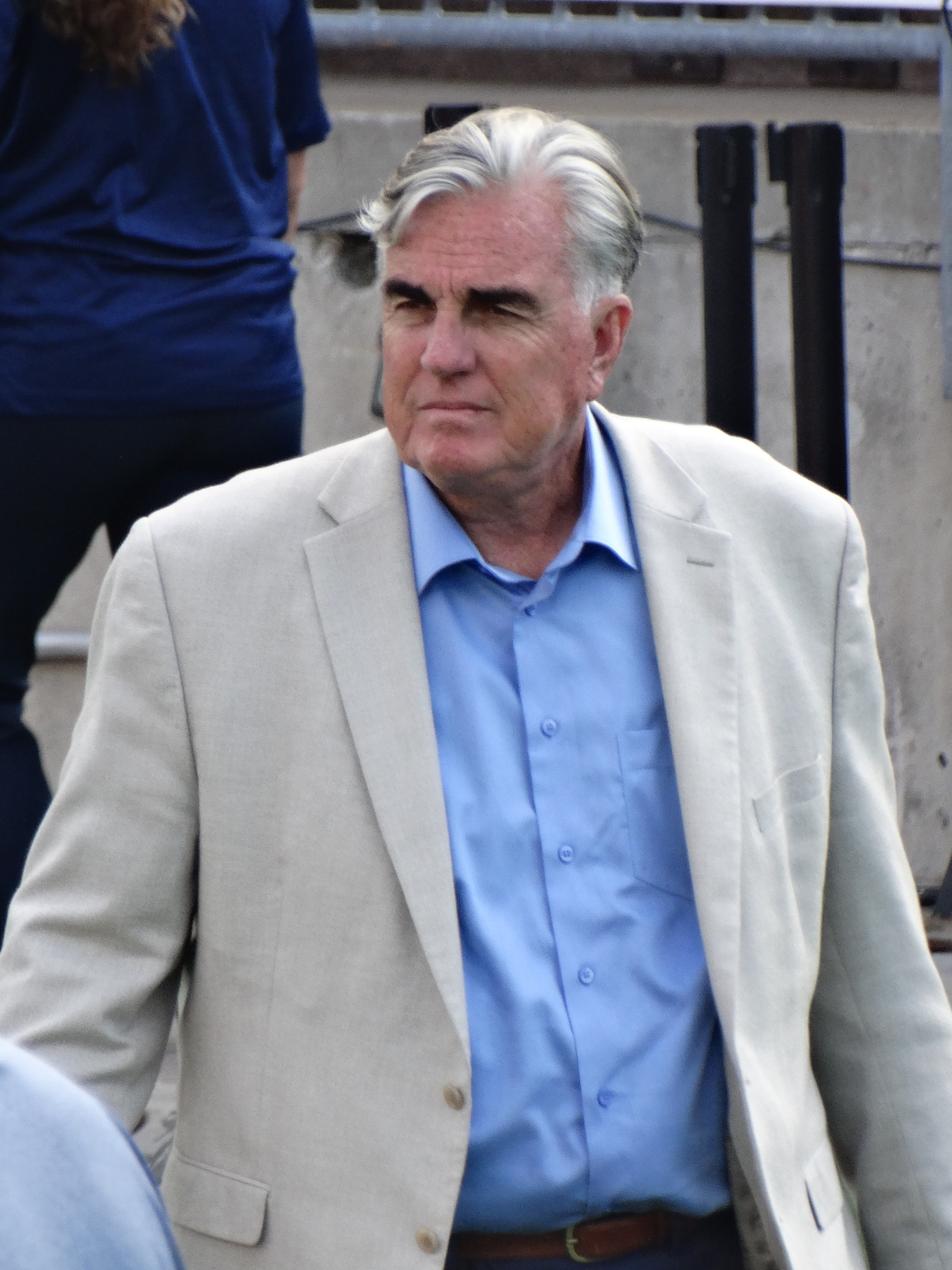
- Barker with the Toronto Argonauts in 2022

Toronto Argonauts
- Title: Director of player personnel

Personal information
- Born: August 25, 1956 (age 70); Pasadena, California, U.S.

Career history

Coaching
- 1978–1981: San Francisco State (AST)
- 1982–1984: Occidental (AST)
- 1985–1987: New Mexico State (AST)
- 1988: Nevada (AST)
- 1989–1995: Pomona-Pitzer (AST)
- 1996: Montreal Alouettes (AST)
- 1997–1998: Toronto Argonauts (OC/OLC)
- 1999: Toronto Argonauts (HC)
- 2001: Los Angeles Xtreme (OC)
- 2002: Montreal Alouettes (OC/QC)
- 2003: Calgary Stampeders (HC)
- 2010–2011: Toronto Argonauts (HC)
- 2019–2020: Hamilton Tiger-Cats (AST)

Operations
- 2005–2007: Calgary Stampeders (GM)
- 2008–2009: Calgary Stampeders (VP/Dir PP)
- 2011–2017: Toronto Argonauts (GM)
- 2019–2020: Hamilton Tiger-Cats (Consultant)
- 2022: Toronto Argonauts (Senior advisor)
- 2026–present: Toronto Argonauts (Dir PP)

Awards and highlights
- 5× Grey Cup champion (1997, 2002, 2008, 2012, 2022); Annis Stukus Trophy (2010)

James Barker (born August 25, 1956) is an American professional football executive who is the director of player personnel for the Toronto Argonauts of the Canadian Football League (CFL). Barker served as the general manager of the Calgary Stampeders from 2005 to 2007, and the Argonauts from 2011 to 2016. He was also the head coach of the Argonauts in 1999, with the Stampeders in 2003, and then again with the Argos from 2010 to 2011. He has also been a sports analyst for the CFL on TSN. Barker has also served as a football operations consultant and assistant coach for the Hamilton Tiger-Cats. He is a five-time Grey Cup champion having won twice as an assistant coach and three times as a football administrator. He received his BA in physical education from the University of Southern California and his MA from San Francisco State University.

== Coaching and executive career ==
=== College football ===
Barker served as an assistant college football coach at San Francisco State (1978–81), Occidental (1982–84), New Mexico State (1985–87), Nevada (1988) and Pomona-Pitzer (1989–95). Barker also served as Pomona-Pitzer's head baseball coach concurrent to his work as the Sagehens' offensive coordinator.

=== CFL ===
Barker's CFL coaching career began in 1996 as a member of the Montreal Alouettes coaching staff. The Alouettes set a team record for wins, but lost in the Eastern Division Finals to the Toronto Argonauts. In 1997, he was named the Argonauts' Co-Offensive Coordinator and offensive line coach and was instrumental in guiding one of the best offences in CFL history. In 1999 he replaced the departing Don Matthews as head coach of the Argonauts, becoming the youngest head coach in the CFL.

=== XFL ===
In 2000, he moved back to the United States and was the offensive coordinator of the Los Angeles Xtreme who went on to win the XFL Championship. His work with quarterback Tommy Maddox is recognized as Maddox went on to win the XFL Player of the Year award and was later named NFL Comeback Player of the Year with the Pittsburgh Steelers.

=== Return to the CFL ===
In 2002, Barker was hired to serve as an in-studio analyst on the America One's CFL telecasts, but instead joined old boss Don Matthews as offensive coordinator and quarterback coach of the Montreal Alouettes, leading them to their first Grey Cup in over 20 years. Quarterback Anthony Calvillo enjoyed his finest season as a pro and was the Terry Evanshen Trophy winner as Eastern Division Player of the Year.

He moved to Calgary in 2003 where he served as the head coach of the Calgary Stampeders. He was fired after a 5–13 season and was replaced by Matt Dunigan.

Barker rejoined the Stampeders in 2005 as general manager. He acquired Henry Burris, Jeremaine Copeland, Rahim Abdullah, and Sandro DeAngelis and played a role in the 2005 CFL draft, selecting players such as John Comiskey, Brett Ralph, and first overall pick Miguel Robede. These changes helped turn the Stampeders' record from 4–14 to 11–7. In 2006, the Stampeders finished 10–8 and lost to the Saskatchewan Roughriders in the Division Semifinals, 30–21. Barker was replaced as general manager by John Hufnagel after the 2007 season. He was reassigned to the position of senior vice-president of football operations and director of player personnel.

On February 9, 2010, Barker returned to the Toronto Argonauts for his second stint as their head coach. After leading the Argos to the playoffs for the first time since 2007, Barker assumed the role of general manager on December 15, 2010, replacing Adam Rita, whose contract was not renewed.

The CFL announced on February 25, 2011, that Barker was the Coach of the Year for 2010, winning the Annis Stukus Trophy. Prior to the 2012 CFL season, Barker made a trade that brought All-Star quarterback Ricky Ray from the Edmonton Eskimos to Toronto to help an offense that had struggled for some time. That move, and others, helped the Argonauts win the league's 100th Grey Cup at Rogers Centre.

After six seasons as the general manager of the Argonauts and compiling a 49–59 record in that time span, Barker was fired on January 24, 2017. Barker spent the 2018 season as a TV analyst on TSN.

On January 3, 2019, the Hamilton Tiger-Cats announced Barker would join the team as a football operations consultant. Following the departure of June Jones just prior to 2019 training camp, Barker also added the title of offensive assistant for the 2019 season. For the 2020 season, he was also named a special teams assistant coach. However, the 2020 CFL season was cancelled and Barker was not retained for the 2021 season.

Barker re-joined the CFL on TSN broadcasts as an analyst for the 2021 CFL season. Following the 2021 season, on March 4, 2022, Barker agreed to re-join the Toronto Argonauts as a senior advisor. On April 30, 2023 Barker stepped down from his role with the Argos. On May 5, 2023, it was announced that he was returning to TSN as a CFL panelist.

On December 8, 2025, it was announced that Barker had re-joined the Argonauts as their director of player personnel.

== CFL GM record ==
Team	Year	Regular season					Postseason		
Team	Year	Won	Lost	Ties	Win %	Finish	Won	Lost	Result
CGY	2005	11	7	0	.611	2nd in West Division	0	1	Lost in West Semi-Final
CGY	2006	10	8	0	.555	2nd in West Division	0	1	Lost in West Semi-Final
CGY	2007	7	10	1	.411	3rd in West Division	0	1	Lost in West Semi-Final
TOR	2011	6	12	0	.333	4th in East Division	–	–	Missed playoffs
TOR	2012	9	9	0	.500	2nd in East Division	3	0	Won Grey Cup
TOR	2013	11	7	0	.611	1st in East Division	0	1	Lost in East Final
TOR	2014	8	10	0	.444	4th in East Division	-	-	Missed playoffs
TOR	2015	10	8	0	.556	3rd in East Division	0	1	Lost in East Semi-Final
TOR	2016	5	13	0	.444	4th in East Division	-	-	Missed playoffs
Total		77	84	1	.478	1 Division; Championship	3	5	1 Grey Cup

== CFL coaching record ==
Team	Year	Regular season					Postseason		
Team	Year	Won	Lost	Ties	Win %	Finish	Won	Lost	Result
TOR	1999	9	9	0	.500	3rd in East Division	0	1	Lost in East Semi-Final
CGY	2003	5	13	0	.278	5th in West Division	–	–	Missed playoffs
TOR	2010	9	9	0	.500	3rd in East Division	1	1	Lost in East Final
TOR	2011	6	12	0	.333	4th in East Division	–	–	Missed playoffs
Total		29	43	0	.403	0 Division; Championships	1	2	0 Grey Cups
