= Shannon James =

Shannon James may refer to:

- Shannon James (model) (born 1987), American model
- Shannon James (gridiron football) (born 1983), gridiron football linebacker
