= Derek Armstrong =

Derek Armstrong may refer to:

- Derek Armstrong (ice hockey) (born 1973), Canadian ice hockey coach
- Derek Armstrong (footballer) (born 1939), English former footballer
- Derek Armstrong (gridiron football) (born 1981), Canadian football guard
- Derek Armstrong (politician) (born 1981), American politician
