= Nik Lewis =

American gridiron football player and coach (born 1982)

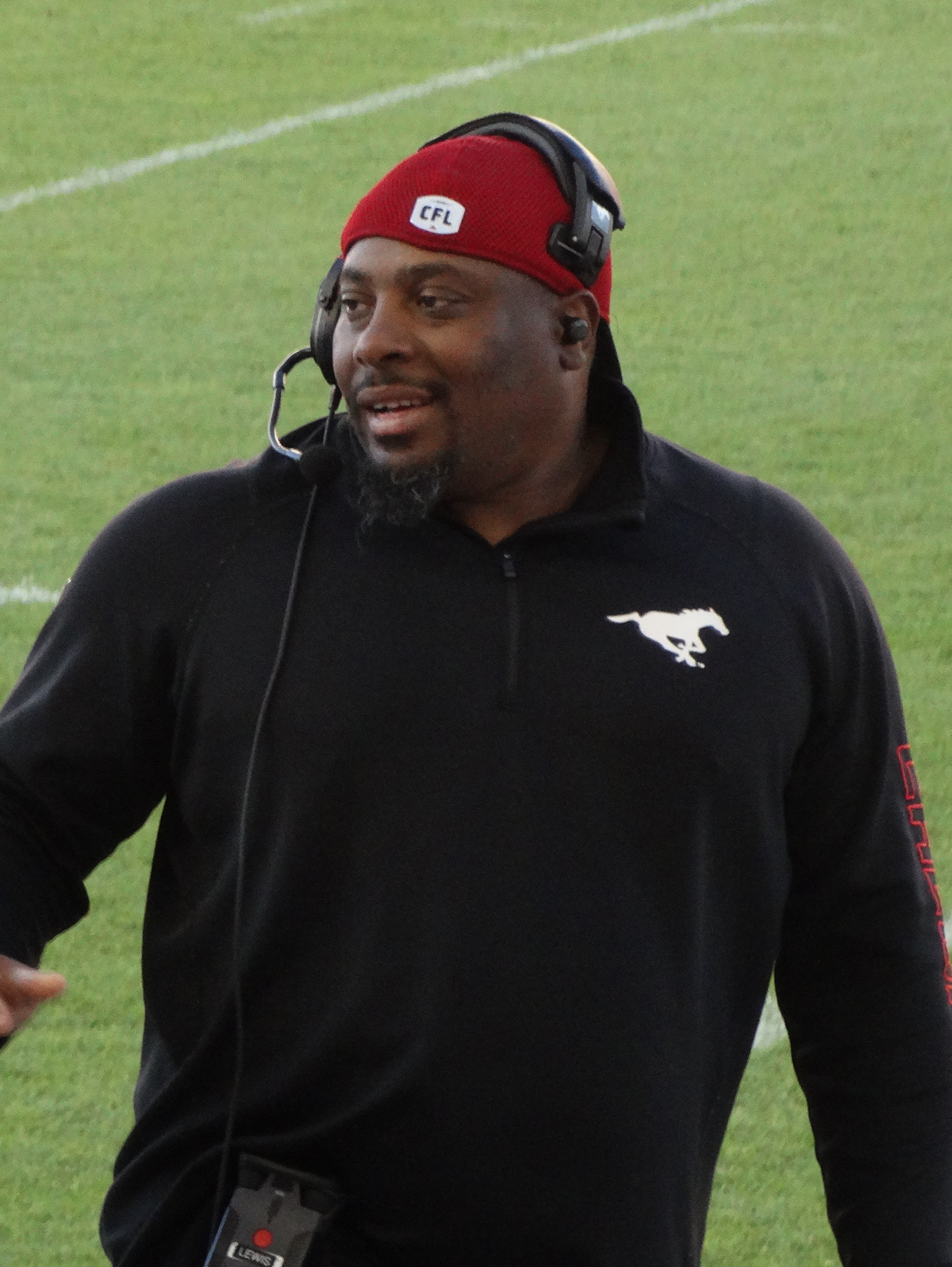
- Lewis with the Calgary Stampeders in 2024

Profile
- Title: Receivers coach

Personal information
- Born: June 3, 1982 (age 44); Mineral Wells, Texas, U.S.
- Listed height: 5 ft 10 in (1.78 m)
- Listed weight: 240 lb (109 kg)

Career information
- Position: Slotback
- College: Southern Arkansas

Career history

Playing
- 2004–2014: Calgary Stampeders
- 2015–2018: Montreal Alouettes

Coaching
- 2019: BC Lions (Running backs coach)
- 2023–2024: Calgary Stampeders (Receivers coach)

Awards and highlights
- 2× Grey Cup champion (2008, 2014); CFL Rookie of the Year (2004); Jackie Parker Trophy (2004); 3× CFL All-Star (2010–2012); CFL East All-Star (2016); 5× CFL West All-Star (2006, 2007, 2010–2012; CFL most career pass receptions (1,051)

Career CFL statistics
- Receptions: 1,051
- Receiving yards: 13,778
- Receiving touchdowns: 71
- Stats at CFL.ca
- Canadian Football Hall of Fame (Class of 2021)

Nikolas Lewis (born June 3, 1982) is an American professional football coach and a former professional slotback who played for 15 years in the Canadian Football League (CFL). He is a two-time Grey Cup champion, winning in 2008 and 2014 with the Stampeders. In his first season, he won the CFL Rookie of the Year award, followed by five West Division All-Star and three CFL All-Star awards. He is second all-time as a Stampeder in receptions (805), receiving yards (11,250), and touchdown catches (65) behind Allen Pitts. He also has the club record for consecutive games with a reception, with 166. On August 24, 2017, Lewis became the CFL all-time leader in receptions with 1,030 catches (he finished his career with 1,051).

Lewis attended Southern Arkansas University and was named an NCAA Division II All-American in 2003. He attended high school in Jacksboro, Texas, where he participated in track, specializing in the triple jump.

== Professional career ==
=== Calgary Stampeders ===
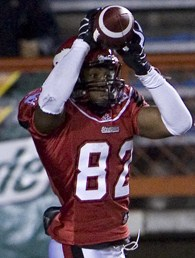
Lewis with the Stampeders in 2007

In 2004, Lewis led the Stampeders in receptions (72), receiving yards (1045), touchdowns (8) and punt return yards (385) and was recognized as the Rookie of the Year by the Canadian Football League. Lewis finished the 2005 CFL season with 1,379 receiving yards, nine touchdowns and 80 receptions, second in the league. 2006 was another strong year for Lewis with the Stampeders as he posting 77 receptions, 1,114 receiving yards and five touchdowns and was named to the 2006 CFL Western Division All-Star team.

The 2007 CFL season saw Lewis achieve 67 receptions, 1,101 receiving yards, and 5 touchdowns. Lewis also had a career long 85 yard reception and was again a CFL Western Division All-Star. Lewis helped lead Calgary to the 96th Grey Cup championship with 87 receptions for 1,109 yards and 10 touchdowns in the 2008 regular season.

In 2009, Lewis had another 1,000-yard season by reaching the plateau in the last 15 minutes in the last game of the regular season. Lewis scored his first and only touchdown of the season in the 17th game of the regular season, earning the unusual distinction of having the lowest touchdowns scored for a 1,000-yard receiver in the history of the CFL. As of the end of this season, Lewis has caught a pass in all 105 games that he has played in.

In 2011 Nik Lewis partnered with Joffrey Reynolds to create www.calmb4storm.com an organization that gives fans an opportunity to experience things otherwise unattainable.

In a 2012 poll of over 250 of his fellow players in the CFL, Lewis was voted "Toughest to Bring Down" out of all other players in the league, with 35% of all votes cast. He also received 8.4% of all votes cast in the category "Toughest Player", finishing third, and placed fourth in the category "Nastiest Player." He received 7.8% of all votes cast in the category "Best Hands", finishing fifth, and he ranked fourth in the category "Best Clutch Performer." Players on the roster of the Calgary Stampeders were not permitted to vote for Lewis. He was the only player to rank in the top five in more than three categories.

During the 2012 CFL Playoffs Lewis sent out the following Tweet "I just bought OJ’s gloves on eBay. Now all I need is a white girl named Nicole." The Tweet was soon deleted by Lewis. Lewis was fined an undisclosed amount by the CFL for violating its social media policy. Lewis subsequently made apologies on two successive days, and announced he was donating the paycheque from his next game (the 2012 Western Final) to a women's charity. Lewis finished the season with over 1,200 yards and 10 touchdowns. It was the 9th consecutive season in which he recorded 1,000 yards.

In Week 8 of the 2013 CFL season Lewis suffered a fractured fibula as he was tackled by BC linebacker Solomon Elimimian. He was expected to miss around 6 weeks due to the injury. However, he instead sat out the rest of the season, which also left his 1,000-yard receiving streak at nine.

Lewis saw a diminished role in 2014, highlighted by his consecutive games with a catch streak snapped in week 5 against the Edmonton Eskimos. He was held without a reception in a regular season game for the first time since June 20, 2004, with the streak ending at 166. He posted career-low totals in receiving yards and failed to score a touchdown in any game of the season, also a career low. Despite the frustrating season, Lewis helped the Stampeders qualify for the 102nd Grey Cup, a game in which he set up Calgary's first touchdown with a 13-yard catch that brought the ball to the one-yard line. He won his second Grey Cup championship following the Stampeders' 20–16 win over the Hamilton Tiger-Cats. After 11 seasons with the Stamps, Lewis was not re-signed following the 2014 season, and became a free agent on February 10, 2015.

=== Montreal Alouettes ===
On February 25, 2015, Lewis and the Montreal Alouettes of the Canadian Football League agreed to a one-year contract. Following a somewhat mediocre 2015 season Lewis was re-signed by the Alouettes. He had a resurgent year in 2016, accomplishing his tenth 1,000 yard season of his career, and his first since 2012. Lewis lead the team with 102 receptions and 1,136 yards receiving. At 34 years of age the Alouettes and Nik Lewis agreed to a two-year contract extension, keeping him with the club through the 2018 season.

On August 24, 2017, Lewis surpassed Geroy Simon's career reception mark to become the all-time CFL receptions leader after recording his 1,030th catch. On October 27, 2017, Lewis told Lee Jones of TSN that he had played his last game after his Alouettes fell to the Saskatchewan Roughriders, 12–37. On May 17, 2018, Lewis officially announced his retirement.

Lewis was inducted into the Canadian Football Hall of Fame as a player in 2021.

== Statistics ==
Receiving		Regular season						Playoffs
Year	Team	Games	No.	Yards	Avg	Long	TD	Games	No.	Yards	Avg	Long	TD
2004	CGY	18	73	1045	14.3	42	8	Team did not qualify
2005	CGY	18	80	1379	17.2	46	9	1	2	28	14.0	15	0
2006	CGY	18	77	1114	14.5	50	5	1	5	36	7.2	12	0
2007	CGY	16	67	1101	16.4	85	5	1	2	19	9.5	14	0
2008	CGY	18	87	1109	12.7	85	10	2	14	184	13.1	31	0
2009	CGY	17	70	1013	14.5	52	1	2	11	145	13.2	26	0
2010	CGY	17	90	1262	14.0	74	9	1	6	55	9.2	16	0
2011	CGY	18	93	1209	13.0	62	5	1	2	31	15.5	17	0
2012	CGY	17	100	1241	12.4	52	10	3	11	132	12	61	0
2013	CGY	7	32	400	12.5	32	3	Placed on injured reserve
2014	CGY	13	37	377	10.2	25	0	2	2	18	9.0	13	0
2015	MTL	17	70	743	10.6	53	2	Team did not qualify
2016	MTL	18	102	1136	11.1	35	3	Team did not qualify
2017	MTL	14	73	649	8.9	21	1	Team did not qualify
CFL totals		226	1,051	13,778	13.1	85	68	15	56	648	11.6	61	0

== Coaching career ==
=== BC Lions ===
Lewis served as the running backs coach for the BC Lions during the 2019 season.

=== Calgary Stampeders ===
On January 3, 2023, it was announced that Lewis had been hired as the receivers coach for the Calgary Stampeders. He served in that role for two seasons.
