= Jon Cornish =

Canadian gridiron football player (born 1984)

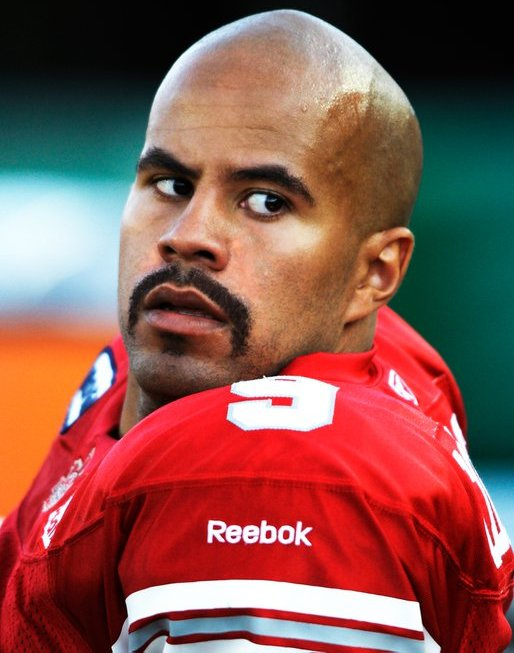
- Cornish with the Calgary Stampeders

No. 9
- Position: Running back

Personal information
- Born: November 5, 1984 (age 42); New Westminster, British Columbia, Canada
- Listed height: 6 ft 0 in (1.83 m)
- Listed weight: 217 lb (98 kg)

Career information
- High school: Burnaby (BC) St. Thomas More
- College: Kansas
- CFL draft: 2006: 2nd round, 13th overall pick

Career history
- 2007–2015: Calgary Stampeders

Awards and highlights
- 2× Grey Cup champion (2008, 2014); CFL's Most Outstanding Player Award (2013); 3× CFL's Most Outstanding Canadian Award (2012–2014); 3× Dr. Beattie Martin Trophy (2012–2014); 3× Eddie James Memorial Trophy (2012–2014); 2× Jeff Nicklin Memorial Trophy (2012, 2013); Lou Marsh Trophy (2013); 3× CFL All-Star (2012–2014); 4× CFL West All-Star (2011–2014); Second-Team CFL 2010s All-Decade Team; First-team All-Big 12 (2006)
- Stats at CFL.ca (archive)
- Canadian Football Hall of Fame (Class of 2019)

Jonathan Michael Cornish (born November 5, 1984) is a Canadian former professional football running back who played nine seasons with the Calgary Stampeders of the Canadian Football League (CFL). He was selected 13th overall in the 2006 CFL draft after playing college football at the University of Kansas. Cornish was inducted as a member of the Canadian Football Hall of Fame in 2019 on his first ballot.

While at Kansas, Cornish set the KU single-season rushing record with 1,457 yards and was selected First Team All-Big XII in his senior year. During his collegiate career, he was also selected Team Offensive MVP in both his junior year and senior year.

Professionally, after taking over starting duties from Calgary's all-time leading rusher Joffrey Reynolds midway through 2011, Cornish rushed for 611 yards in the final seven games of the season, averaging 7.7 yards per carry. In the Stampeders only 2011 playoff game versus the Edmonton Eskimos, he ran for 128 yards and a touchdown while averaging 9.2 yards per carry. Those eight games were enough to garner him the 2011 Calgary Booster Club Male Athlete of the Year award and a CFL West All-star selection.

In his first full year as a starter, Cornish led the CFL in rushing with 1,457 rushing yards on the ground. Cornish also broke Normie Kwong’s 56-year-old single-season rushing record for Canadians. This led to him being selected 2012 Most Outstanding Canadian as well as being the runner-up for the Most Outstanding Player award. Cornish was again selected for Calgary's Male Athlete of the Year award. He bettered this in 2013, rushing for 1813 yards and winning both the Most Outstanding Canadian and the Most Outstanding Player awards. Soon after, Cornish was awarded the Lou Marsh Trophy as Canada's top athlete for 2013.

In 2014, Cornish led the CFL in rushing for the third time with 1,082 yards, an average of 7.8 yards per carry. This was despite only playing in 9 games, half of the regular season. He was a member of the 2014 Grey Cup Champion Calgary Stampeders.

His career achievements were recognized in 2018 when the award for the top Canadian in NCAA Division One football was named the Jon Cornish Trophy honouring his career as a high school and professional player in Canada, and a college player in the NCAA.

== Early life ==
Cornish attended high school at the highly sports-oriented St. Thomas More Collegiate (STMC) in Burnaby, where he participated actively in basketball, track & field and football. In football, he rushed for 3,200 career yards and 49 touchdowns as a three-year letter-winner for Saint Thomas More High School. Cornish averaged 14.9 yards per carry while rushing for 2,136 yards and 31 touchdowns as a senior. His single-game best was 336 yards and four touchdowns.

Cornish is also credited with 152 career tackles, including 89 his senior season and holds his school career record with 37 quarterback sacks, 21 of which he had while a junior. At the end of his senior year, Cornish was selected the British Columbia Provincial Football Player of the Year in the year of its inception.

While at STMC, Cornish was on two Varsity AAA Provincial High School Football Championship teams.

== College career ==
=== Early career ===
Following his medical redshirt, Cornish saw very limited playing time, rushing only 3 times for 8 yards in his first two years.

=== Junior year ===
Cornish played in all 12 games of his junior season and was awarded the John Hadl award for most valuable offensive player of the year on his college team despite not starting a single game. Cornish led his team in all rushing categories with 780 total yards, 9 rushing touchdowns and rushing yards per game and yards per carry with 65 and 5.8, respectively. His efforts in the classroom made him an Academic All-Big 12 second-team selection.

Against Nebraska on his birthday, November 5, 2005, Cornish contributed a touchdown run of 72 yards to help seal Kansas' first victory over Nebraska in 38 years.

In Kansas' second Bowl game appearance under Coach Mangino, playing against the Houston Cougars, Cornish helped his team to their first bowl victory with 101 yards rushing. He also had two touchdown receptions for 13 and 30 yards.

Following his junior season, Cornish was drafted in the Canadian Football League draft by the Calgary Stampeders.

=== Senior year ===
In Cornish's senior year, he rushed for 1,457 yards, making him the all-time single-season rusher at the University of Kansas.

Cornish averaged 5.8 yards per carry, scored 8 rushing touchdowns, 1 passing touchdown, and had 8 games of 100 yards of rushing or more. Cornish was the Big 12's leader in all-purpose yards with an average of 137.6 yards per contest. Cornish finished the season as the 9th leading rusher in NCAA Division I-A football and the 1st in rushing in the Big 12 Conference. Cornish's efforts were enough to earn him First Team Big XII honours and his second John Hadl team Offensive MVP award. In addition, Cornish's 5.8 yards per carry is the highest single-season mark in school history by a back with more than 200 carries, higher than that of former Kansas greats Gale Sayers and John Riggins.

Cornish's career-high rushing in a single game came on November 18, 2006, when he rushed for 201 yards and two touchdowns against Kansas State helping Kansas gain bowl eligibility for the second year in a row. Ultimately, Kansas was not selected for a bowl game.

== Professional career ==
=== 2007 ===
After going undrafted by the NFL, Cornish chose to play in the CFL instead of testing NFL free agency. The Calgary Stampeders had previously drafted him in 2006 with their 13th overall selection in the 2006 CFL draft. He signed with the Stampeders on April 30, 2007, spending most of his time with the special teams unit. He went on to lead the team in special teams tackles with 21 in his first year.

=== 2008 ===
Cornish would see increased repetitions with the offence in 2008 backing up Joffrey Reynolds. Despite only having 30 carries on the season, Cornish made the most of his opportunities and ended the season with 254 yards rushing averaging 8.5 yards per carry. His first long run in the CFL was against Hamilton for 48 yards. In 2008, he also scored his first professional touchdown against his hometown BC Lions in the last game of the regular season.

He contributed to the Stampeders playoff efforts and was a part of the 2008 Grey Cup Championship Team.

=== 2009 ===
In 2009, a preseason injury caused Cornish to miss 3 games. After he returned, Jon contributed primarily on special teams placing second in special teams tackles for the Stampeders at the end of the year.

=== 2010 ===
In his fourth season in Calgary, Cornish established a number of career highs and earned the Stampeders’ nomination for the Canadian Football League's Most Outstanding Canadian award.

His 7.3-yard average per rush was tops in the CFL among running backs, with at least 50 carries and he ran for a career-high 618 yards. He had three carries of at least 50 yards — a 52-yarder against Edmonton on Aug. 15, a 50-yard dash against Saskatchewan on July 24 and another 50-yarder against The Lions on Aug. 28. He also contributed as a receiver, making 14 catches for 226 yards and one touchdown for an average of 16.5 yards per catch, highest of all CFL running backs that year.

On special teams, he made 12 tackles and also returned 12 kickoffs for 224 yards. Cornish twice earned top Canadian honours in the CFL player of the week awards during the 2010 season as he was recognized for his efforts in Week 4 and Week 9.

During the playoffs Cornish was selected by CFL fans as the winner of the 2010 Reebok Rediscover campaign. In the final round of voting, Cornish's description of what had motivated him as a player prevailed over Roughrider Darian Durant’s narration of his defining moment as an athlete.

=== 2011 ===
Despite not making his first start of the season until Week 13, Cornish led the Stampeders in rushing, was first among all CFL running backs in rushing touchdowns, tied for the league lead in total touchdowns and earned West Division all-star recognition. After being installed as the starter, he ran for 611 yards and seven touchdowns in seven contests. The seven touchdowns were the most of any CFL player during that period and the 611 yards were second only to Toronto’s Cory Boyd.

For the season, he posted career highs in carries (119), rushing yards (863), rushing touchdowns (nine), catches (26), receiving yards (385) and receiving touchdowns (two). His 7.3-yard-per-carry average led all CFL players with at least 60 rushing attempts. His 11 total touchdowns tied him for the league lead and were the most by a Canadian Stampeders player since 1995. In addition to his excellent work on offence, Cornish was tied for second on the club with 13 special-teams tackles and returned eight kickoffs for 167 yards. Cornish recorded a pair of 100-yard rushing games during the regular season including a career-high 149-yard performance on Oct. 1 against Saskatchewan that resulted in him being named both the top offensive player and top Canadian in the CFL’s player-of-the-week awards. He also ran for 128 yards on Oct. 14 against Toronto — including a career-best 57-yard dash — and again picked up the CFL’s Canadian player of the week honour. He was also named the CFL’s Canadian of the month for September after posting 336 rushing yards, two touchdowns, a 9.9-yard-per-carry average and eight receptions for 166 yards.

He picked up more league recognition in the playoffs as he was named the Canadian player of the week after rushing for 127 yards and one touchdown in the West semifinal against Edmonton. For the second year in a row, Cornish was the Stamps’ nominee for the CFL's Most Outstanding Canadian award.

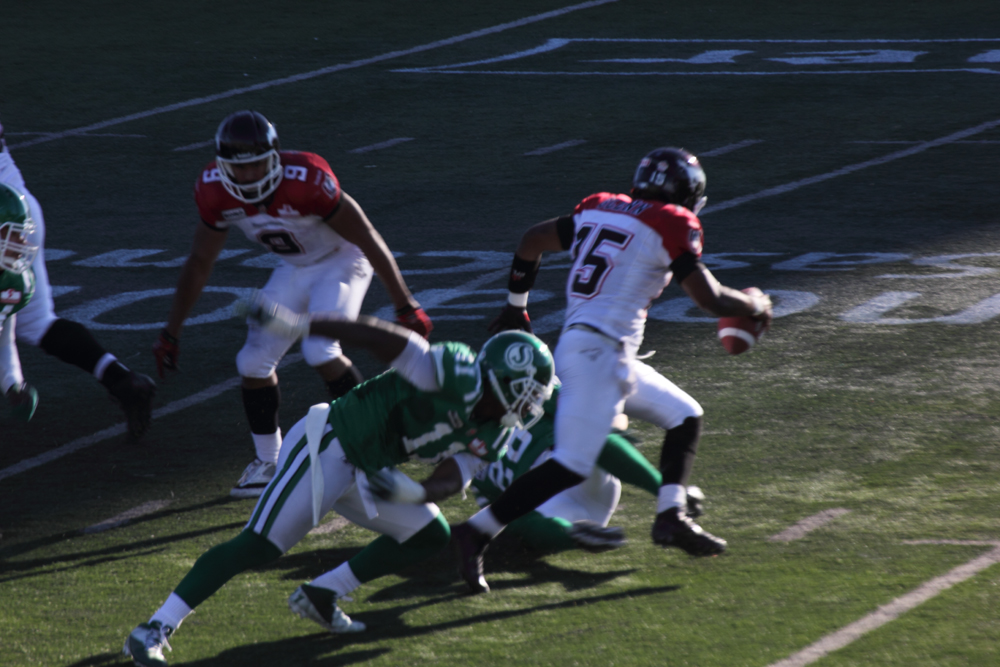
Cornish (#9) in 2012.

=== 2012 ===
In his first full season as a starter, Cornish ran for 1,457 yards as he won the CFL rushing title and broke Normie Kwong's 56-year-old single-season rushing record for Canadians. He turned in four games with at least 150 yards over the course of the season, accumulating 170 yards on Aug. 9 in Hamilton, 159 yards at Saskatchewan on Aug. 25, a career-best 185 yards on Sept. 7 in Edmonton and 180 yards in a Sept. 28 home game against the Eskimos. He shared the league lead with 11 rushing touchdowns and was also a threat in the passing game as he had 38 catches for 338 yards and two scores. Cornish was named the CFL's Canadian player of the month in August, September and October/November. He was also voted Canadian player of the week seven times and offensive player of the week once during the regular season and Canadian player of the week twice more in the playoffs. Cornish's rushing total was the best in the CFL since 2009, the second-best since 2006 and the seventh-best single-season total in Stampeders’ franchise history. In the post-season, he racked up a combined total of 51 carries for 278 yards — including 100-yard games in both the West semifinal and West final — and three receptions for 58 yards. Cornish was named the CFL's Most Outstanding Canadian and was the West Division finalist for the Most Outstanding Player. He was also selected to the West Division, CFL and CFLPA all-star teams.

=== 2013 ===
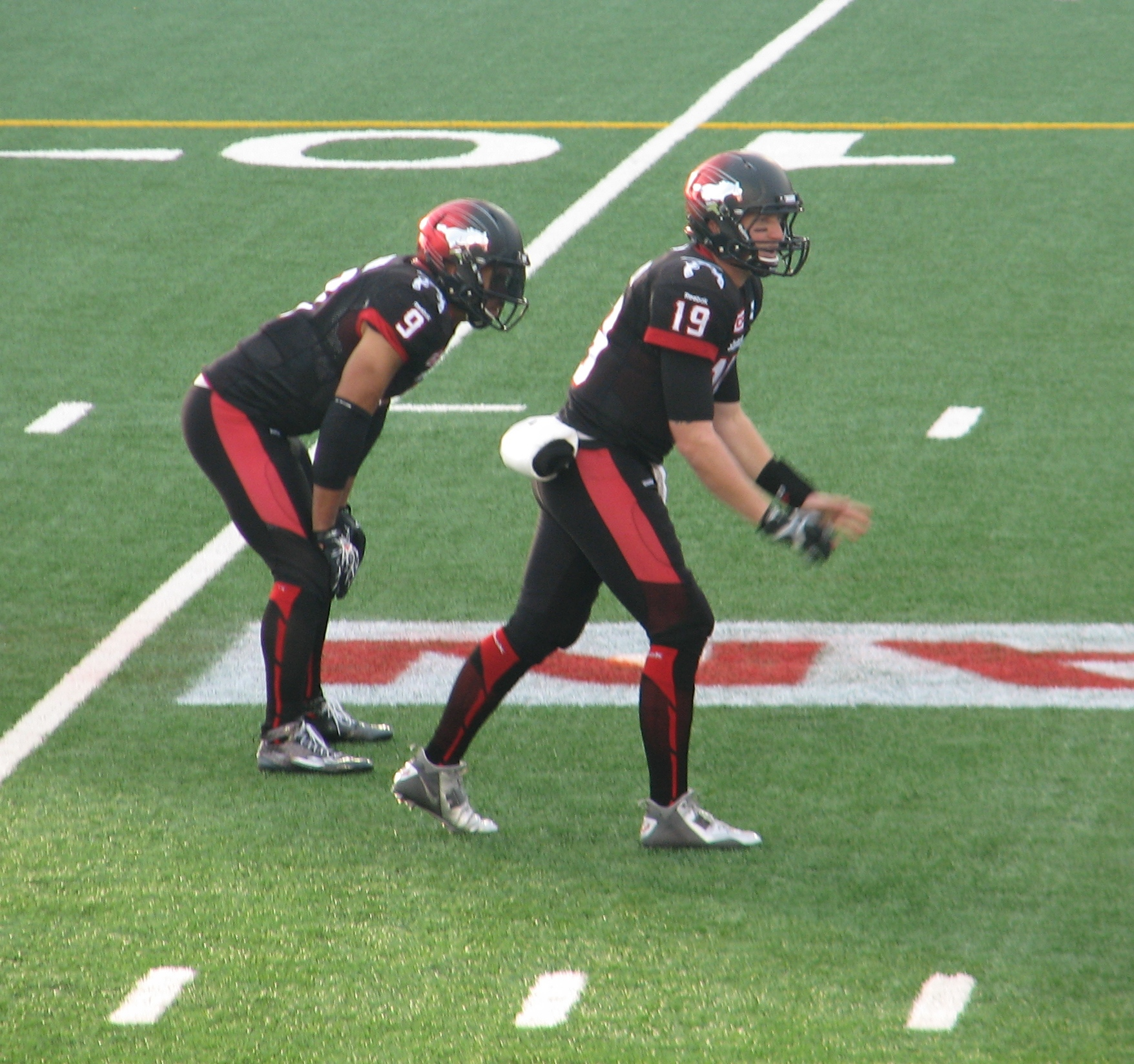
Cornish (#9) in 2014.

Cornish had an outstanding 2013 season. Cornish played in all but one game of the 18 game regular season. His 258 rushing attempts was identical to his rushing attempts in 2012, but in 2013 he ran for 356 more yards, totalling 1,813. He won Outstanding Canadian of the Week 7 times (4 of them consecutively), Offensive Player of the Week once, Offensive Player of the Month for the month of October, and was the most Outstanding Canadian for the months of July, September and October (3 of the 4 months). His 12 rushing touchdowns and 42 pass receptions were also personal bests. He was nominated by the Stampeders as their Most Outstanding Player and Most Outstanding Canadian. On November 21, 2013, Cornish became the third Canadian to win the CFL MOP award, followed by winning the Lou Marsh Trophy as Canada's top athlete for 2013.

=== 2014 ===
Cornish's 2014 CFL season was limited by various injuries. Nonetheless, Cornish wound up leading the league in rushing yards with 1,082, despite only playing in nine of 18 regular season games. This was his third straight rushing title and third straight 1000-yard season. He ran for more than 100 yards six times, with four of those games being over 150 rushing yards. Cornish won Offensive Player of the Week three times, Outstanding Canadian of the Week six times and he won Offensive Player of the Month and Outstanding Canadian of the Month for the month of September. To cap off his season, he was named a West-division All-Star for the 4th consecutive season. He won the CFL's Most Outstanding Canadian Award for the third consecutive season in 2014.

=== 2015 ===
Similar to his 2014 season Cornish missed 9 games during the 2015 season due to nagging injuries. He suffered a broken thumb in late July before complaining of neck stiffness after a 15–11 loss at home to the Edmonton Eskimos on Oct. 10. He would finish the season with 115 carries for 622 yards (5.4 average) with 4 rushing touchdowns. He also contributed 138 yards on 19 pass receptions.

Following the completion of his ninth CFL season Cornish decided to announce his retirement. His decision was based primarily on preserving his health.

== CFL career statistics ==
Rushing		Regular season						Playoffs
Year	Team	Games	No.	Yards	Avg	Long	TD	Games	No.	Yards	Avg	Long	TD
2007	CGY	18	2	30	15.0	18	0	1	0	0	0.0	0	0
2008	CGY	18	30	254	8.5	48	1	2	0	0	0.0	0	0
2009	CGY	15	20	105	5.3	28	2	2	0	0	0.0	0	0
2010	CGY	18	85	618	7.3	52	0	1	3	31	10.3	28	0
2011	CGY	18	119	863	7.3	57	9	1	14	127	9.3	29	1
2012	CGY	18	258	1,457	5.6	73	11	3	51	278	5.5	0	0
2013	CGY	17	258	1,813	7.0	53	12	1	9	67	7.4	32	0
2014	CGY	9	139	1,082	7.8	79	5	1	14	54	3.9	11	1
2015	CGY	9	115	622	5.4	26	4	–	–	–	–	–	–
CFL totals		140	1,026	6,844	6.7	79	44	12	91	557	6.1	29	2

via CFL stats page

== Post-football career ==
Cornish earned his Chartered Financial Analyst designation in 2019, and has since been working as an Investment Advisor with the Royal Bank of Canada.

In 2020 Cornish founded Calgary Black Chambers, an organization of professional people who support post-college youth.

In April 2022 Cornish was named as the 15th chancellor of the University of Calgary.
