= Reggie Williams (Canadian football) =

American gridiron football player (born 1983)

Profile
- Position: Wide receiver

Personal information
- Born: July 23, 1983 (age 43); Lake Charles, Louisiana, U.S.
- Listed height: 6 ft 3 in (1.91 m)
- Listed weight: 202 lb (92 kg)

Career information
- College: LSU
- NFL draft: 2008: undrafted

Career history
- 2008: Calgary Stampeders

Awards and highlights
- Grey Cup champion (2008)
- Stats at CFL.ca

Reggie Williams (born July 23, 1983) is an American former professional football wide receiver. He was signed by the Calgary Stampeders as a street free agent in 2008. He played college football for the LSU Tigers.
