= Jonathan Lapointe =

Canadian football player (born 1984)

No. 49
- Position: Running back

Personal information
- Born: September 25, 1984 (age 42); Quebec City, Quebec, Canada
- Listed height: 5 ft 11 in (1.80 m)
- Listed weight: 244 lb (111 kg)

Career information
- University: Montreal
- CFL draft: 2008: 6th round, 48th overall pick

Career history
- 2008: Calgary Stampeders*
- 2009: Montreal Alouettes*
- * Offseason or practice squad member only

Awards and highlights
- Grey Cup champion (2008)
- Stats at CFL.ca

Jonathan Lapointe (born September 25, 1984) is a Canadian former professional football running back. He was drafted by the Calgary Stampeders in the sixth round of the 2008 CFL draft. He played CIS Football for the Montreal Carabins.

Lapointe was also a member of the Montreal Alouettes.
