= Tristan Black =

Canadian football player (born 1984)

No. 51
- Position: Linebacker

Personal information
- Born: April 8, 1984 (age 42); Toronto, Ontario, Canada
- Listed height: 6 ft 3 in (1.91 m)
- Listed weight: 243 lb (110 kg)

Career information
- High school: Central Tech
- College: Wayne State
- CFL draft: 2009: 2nd round, 16th overall pick

Career history
- 2009–2010: Calgary Stampeders
- 2010–2012: Toronto Argonauts
- 2013–2014: Saskatchewan Roughriders

Awards and highlights
- 2× Grey Cup champion (2012, 2013)
- Stats at CFL.ca (archive)

Tristan Black (born April 8, 1984) is a Canadian former professional football linebacker. He was drafted by the Calgary Stampeders in the second round of the 2009 CFL draft. He played college football for the Wayne State Warriors. He attended Central Tech and Northern Secondary in Toronto, Ontario.

== Professional career ==
Black was drafted by the Calgary Stampeders with the 16th overall pick in the second round of the 2009 CFL draft and signed with the club on May 29, 2009. He played with the Stampeders for five games until sustaining an ankle injury, keeping him out of the lineup well into the 2010 season. Upon his recovery and activation from the nine-game injured list, Black was traded to the Toronto Argonauts on August 22, 2010. He played for two and a half seasons with his hometown Argonauts, including the 2012 season when he was a member of the 100th Grey Cup winning team. Upon entering free agency, he with the Saskatchewan Roughriders on February 16, 2013. He won his second consecutive Grey Cup championship with the Roughriders during their 101st Grey Cup victory. Following two years with the team, Black was released by the Roughriders on January 6, 2015.
