= John Hufnagel =

American football player (born 1951)

Toronto Argonauts
- Title: Special advisor

Personal information
- Born: September 13, 1951 (age 75); Coraopolis, Pennsylvania, U.S.
- Listed height: 6 ft 1 in (1.85 m)
- Listed weight: 194 lb (88 kg)

Career information
- Position: Quarterback (No. 16, 12)
- High school: McKees Rocks (PA) Montour
- College: Penn State
- NFL draft: 1973: 14th round, 348th overall pick

Career history

Playing
- Denver Broncos (1973–1975); Calgary Stampeders (1976–1979); Saskatchewan Roughriders (1980–1983); Winnipeg Blue Bombers (1983–1986); Saskatchewan Roughriders (1987)

Coaching
- Saskatchewan Roughriders (1987) Quarterbacks coach/Receivers coach; Calgary Stampeders (1990–1996) Offensive coordinator; Calgary Stampeders (1994–1996) Assistant head coach; New Jersey Red Dogs (1997–1998) Head coach; Cleveland Browns (1999–2000) Quarterbacks coach; Indianapolis Colts (2001) Quarterbacks coach; Jacksonville Jaguars (2002) Quarterbacks coach; New England Patriots (2003) Quarterbacks coach; New York Giants (2004–2006) Offensive coordinator; Calgary Stampeders (2008–2015) Head coach

Operations
- New Jersey Red Dogs (1997–1998) General manager; Calgary Stampeders (2008–2022) General manager; Calgary Stampeders (2016–2023) President; Calgary Stampeders (2023) Football operations consultant; Calgary Stampeders (2024–2025) Special advisor; Toronto Argonauts (2026–present) Special advisor

Awards and highlights
- Super Bowl champion (XXXVIII); 5× Grey Cup champion (1984, 1992, 2008, 2014, 2018); 2× CFL Coach of the Year (2008, 2014); First-team All-American (1972); 2× First-team All-East (1971, 1972)

Career NFL statistics
- Passing attempts: 61
- Passing completions: 22
- Completion percentage: 36.1%
- TD–INT: 1–9
- Passing yards: 357
- Passer rating: 22.4
- Stats at Pro Football Reference
- Coaching profile at Pro Football Reference

Career CFL statistics
- Passing attempts: 2,694
- Passing completions: 1,495
- Completion percentage: 55.5
- TD–INT: 127–131
- Passing yards: 21,594
- Canadian Football Hall of Fame

John Coleman Hufnagel (born September 13, 1951) is an American special advisor for the Toronto Argonauts of the Canadian Football League (CFL). He has previously served as the Calgary Stampeders' president, general manager, head coach, and offensive coordinator. He played quarterback for fifteen professional seasons in the CFL and National Football League (NFL). Prior to his hiring to the Stampeders on December 3, 2007, he was the offensive coordinator of the New York Giants of the NFL.

== Playing career ==
Hufnagel was an All-American at Penn State University in 1972, where he was the starting quarterback for three seasons (1970–1972) with a 26–3 record under head coach Joe Paterno. As a junior, he was instrumental in the Nittany Lions' 30–6 Cotton Bowl victory in Dallas over the University of Texas. He led a backfield which included Franco Harris and Lydell Mitchell and Penn State finished 11–1, fifth in the final AP poll.

In 1972, Hufnagel became the first Nittany Lion quarterback to pass for more than 2,000 yards in a season. His 2,039 passing yards set Penn State's single-season record for passing yards (since broken) and he remains among the top 10 in most major career passing categories. He finished sixth in the Heisman Trophy voting that year, won by Johnny Rodgers of Nebraska, (and won the following year by Penn State running back John Cappelletti). Hufnagel's final game as a collegian was the Sugar Bowl in New Orleans, a 14–0 shutout loss to the University of Oklahoma on New Year's Eve. Without Cappelletti due to the flu, the Penn State running game was weak and the Sooner defense dominated the game.

A 14th-round selection (348th overall) of the Denver Broncos in the 1973 NFL draft, Hufnagel spent three seasons with the Broncos, then twelve more in the Canadian Football League with the Calgary Stampeders (1976–1979), Saskatchewan Roughriders (1980–1983, 1987), and Winnipeg Blue Bombers (1984–1986).

== Player-coach & early coaching career ==
=== Player-coach ===
In 1987, Hufnagel served as a player-coach for the Saskatchewan Roughriders. The Roughriders acquired his playing rights from Winnipeg, and named him as their Quarterback/Receiver Coach. On August 28, in a 39-13 loss to the Edmonton Eskimos, Hufnagel saw his first playing action of the season. During the game, he suffered a career ending Achilles tendon injury.

In his coaching role, Hufnagel helped mentor the team's young quarterbacks: Jeff Bentrim, Tom Burgess, and Kent Austin, who joined the team later in the season.

During the 2014 Grey Cup Coaches News Conference, when Hufnagel and Austin were opposing coaches, Austin credited Hufnagel for giving him shortcuts in 1987 so that he could have a chance to succeed early as a Canadian Football quarterback instead of having to go through huge growing pains due to inexperience.

=== Early coaching career ===
In 1988 and 1989, Hufnagel worked as real estate agent in Calgary. During this time, he also served as a guest coach for the Saskatchewan Roughriders and as a volunteer coach at the University of Calgary.

== Professional coaching career ==
=== Canadian Football League ===
In January 1990, Hufnagel was hired by new Calgary Stampeders head coach, Wally Buono, to be the team's quarterbacks and running backs coach. By March, he had been given the title of offensive coordinator. In June 1994, Hufnagel added Assistant Head Coach to his title.

Under Hufnagel's tutelage, the five- and six-receiver package became a staple in Calgary's offence. In 1994, Calgary set CFL records for points scored one season (698), touchdowns one season (82), and touchdowns passing one season (52).

Future Pro Bowler quarterbacks Doug Flutie and Jeff Garcia earned All-CFL honors. In 1994, Allen Pitts set a CFL record for receiving yards in a season (2,036). Receiver Dave Sapunjis was the CFL's Most Outstanding Canadian twice (1993 and 1995). In 1995, Pitts and Sapunjis both caught 100 passes.

=== Arena Football League and CFL ===
In 1997, Hufnagel became head coach and general manager of the Arena Football League’s New Jersey Red Dogs. In two seasons there, he posted a 17–11 record.

In the second half of both the 1997 and 1998 CFL seasons, the BC Lions brought Hufnagel in as a consultant to help with their offence.

=== National Football League ===
After two seasons (1999, 2000) as the quarterbacks coach for the Cleveland Browns, Hufnagel was named the quarterbacks coach of the Indianapolis Colts, where he coached Peyton Manning to a 62.7 percent completion percentage and for 4,131 yards passing. He spent the 2002 season as the quarterbacks coach on Tom Coughlin’s staff in Jacksonville. That year, quarterback Mark Brunell threw only seven interceptions in 416 pass attempts, and an 85.7 quarterback rating. He spent the 2003 season with the Super Bowl champion New England Patriots. Under Hufnagel's tutelage, Tom Brady earned a second Super Bowl MVP award, completing 60.2 percent of his passes for 3,620 yards and 23 touchdowns.

Hufnagel became the offensive coordinator of the New York Giants in 2004, and molded them into one of the NFL's most potent offenses. Tiki Barber set a franchise rushing record two years in a row, and the Giants became only the fifth team in NFL history to have five different players score at least seven touchdowns. (Tiki Barber, Jeremy Shockey, Plaxico Burress, Amani Toomer and Brandon Jacobs). While Hufnagel is credited with the rapid development of quarterback Eli Manning, he is sometimes criticized for his often predictable play-calling and an inability to utilize his offensive play-makers effectively.

During the 2006 season, Hufnagel came under much criticism for being too pass-happy and abandoning the running game after the Giants trailed during games. In addition, he was also questioned for having Manning throw the ball the third and sixth most passes in the league over 2005 and 2006 despite Tiki Barber clearly being the best player on offense. In addition, his situational play-calling came under scrutiny, such as when running back Brandon Jacobs was removed from the game inside the five yard-line in two games, thus making the offense more predictable to opposing defenses.

Following a 30–7 defeat by the New Orleans Saints, Hufnagel was stripped of his duties as offensive coordinator. A week later, it was revealed he was fired.

=== Return to the CFL ===
During the BC Lions' 2007 training camp, Hufnagel served as a guest coach.

On December 3, 2007, Hufnagel was hired as the head coach and general manager of the Calgary Stampeders. In his first season, he led the Stampeders to the Grey Cup title with a 22–14 victory over the Montreal Alouettes on November 23. For his performance in the 2008 CFL season, he was awarded the Annis Stukus Trophy as the CFL's coach of the year.

On March 29, 2012, the Stampeders announced that Hufnagel had agreed to a five-year contract extension. That year, he guided the Stamps back to the Grey Cup game. The Stampeders lost the 100th Grey Cup game to the Toronto Argonauts 35-22. In the 2013 CFL season, Hufnagel and the Stampeders finished the season with a league-best 14-4 record. They lost the Western Final to Saskatchewan.

The following season, Hufnagel led the Stampeders to a 15-3 record, the top record in the CFL once again. In the playoffs, the Calgary Stampeders faced the Edmonton Eskimos (who previously eliminated Saskatchewan) and defeated them 43-18, leading them to Calgary's second Grey Cup in three years. They would face the Hamilton Tiger-Cats in the 102nd Grey Cup and win the game 20-16 for Calgary's seventh Grey Cup championship. Following the Stampeder's championship season of 2014, Hufnagel was awarded the Annis Stukus Trophy as the CFL coach of the year for the second time in his career.

On December 3, 2014, Hufnagel announced that the 2015 season would be his last in coaching. In 2016, the plan was for offensive coordinator Dave Dickenson to take over as head coach, with Hufnagel continuing as general manager. In week 17 of 2015, Hufnagel reached 100 wins as a head coach and as a general manager. When he left coaching, Hufnagel was the second-winningest head coach in Stampeders history, trailing only Buono. He was also tied with Bud Grant as the ninth-winningest coach in CFL history (102 wins), and had the most wins of any coach, along with Grant, who spent his entire CFL coaching career with just one team.

In January 2016, Hufnagel was named president of the Stampeders, and continued as general manager. Calgary went to the next three Grey Cup games, winning in 2018.

Prior to the 2023 season, Hufnagel stepped down as general manager, and the position was given to Dickenson. Hufnagel gained 175 wins as Calgary's general manager, which placed him fourth all-time in CFL history. He retained his position as team president and added football operations consultant to his title.

On January 23, 2024, the Stampeders announced that Hufnagel would remain with the organization and assume the role of special advisor to Jay McNeil, the football club's new president, and to Dickenson, the football club's general manager and head coach.

On December 4, 2025, it was announced that Hufnagel had joined the Toronto Argonauts as a senior advisor to the general manager and head coach.

He was inducted into the Canadian Football Hall of Fame as a builder in 2020.

=== CFL coaching record ===
Team	Year	Regular season					Postseason		
Team	Year	Won	Lost	Ties	Win %	Finish	Won	Lost	Result
CGY	2008	13	5	0	.722	1st in West Division	2	0	Won Grey Cup
CGY	2009	10	7	1	.583	2nd in West Division	1	1	Lost West Final
CGY	2010	13	5	0	.722	1st in West Division	0	1	Lost West Final
CGY	2011	11	7	0	.611	3rd in West Division	0	1	Lost West Semi-Final
CGY	2012	12	6	0	.666	2nd in West Division	2	1	Lost Grey Cup
CGY	2013	14	4	0	.777	1st in West Division	0	1	Lost West Final
CGY	2014	15	3	0	.833	1st in West Division	2	0	Won Grey Cup
CGY	2015	14	4	0	.777	2nd in West Division	1	1	Lost West Final
Total		102	41	1	.712	4 West Division; Championships	8	6	2 Grey Cups

== Personal life ==
Hufnagel earned a Bachelor of Science degree in marketing from Penn State University in 1973. Hufnagel and his wife, Sherry, live in Cochrane, Alberta. He has two daughters, Neely and Lindsey. His son, Cole, has been employed in the Stampeders' scouting department since 2016. He graduated from Montour High School in McKees Rocks, Pennsylvania, a suburb southwest of Pittsburgh.

== See also ==
- List of NCAA major college football yearly passing leaders

Preceded by Kent Austin	Grey Cup winning head coach 96th Grey Cup, 2008	Succeeded by Marc Trestman
