= Eric Fraser (Canadian football) =

Canadian football player (born 1987)

No. 7
- Position: Defensive back

Personal information
- Born: May 5, 1987 (age 39); Burnaby, British Columbia, Canada
- Listed height: 6 ft 1 in (1.85 m)
- Listed weight: 201 lb (91 kg)

Career information
- High school: Burnaby Central
- College: Central Michigan
- CFL draft: 2009: 1st round, 8th overall pick
- Expansion draft: 2013: 3rd round

Career history
- 2010–2013: Calgary Stampeders
- 2014: Ottawa Redblacks
- 2015–2016: BC Lions
- Stats at CFL.ca

Eric Fraser (born May 5, 1987) is a Canadian former professional football defensive back who played in the Canadian Football League (CFL). He was drafted as the eighth overall selection by the Calgary Stampeders in the first round of the 2009 CFL draft. He was selected in the 2013 CFL expansion draft by the Ottawa Redblacks and played one season for the team before signing with his hometown BC Lions on July 14, 2015. He played high school football at Burnaby Central Secondary School and played college football for the Central Michigan University Chippewas of the Mid-American Conference.
