= Jeremaine Copeland =

American gridiron football player (born 1977)

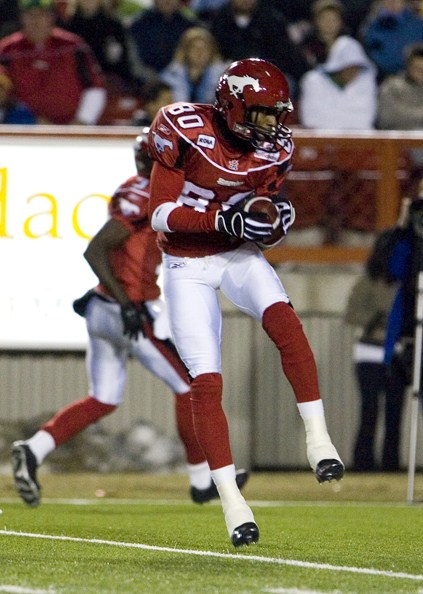
- Copeland with the Calgary Stampeders in 2007

Profile
- Position: Wide receiver

Personal information
- Born: February 19, 1977 (age 49); Harriman, Tennessee, U.S.
- Listed height: 6 ft 2 in (1.88 m)
- Listed weight: 202 lb (92 kg)

Career information
- College: Tennessee

Career history

Playing
- 2000: Barcelona Dragons
- 2001: Los Angeles Xtreme
- 2001–2004: Montreal Alouettes
- 2005–2009: Calgary Stampeders
- 2010–2011: Toronto Argonauts

Coaching
- 2012: Hamilton Tiger-Cats
- 2015: Saskatchewan Roughriders

Awards and highlights
- 2× Grey Cup champion (2002, 2008); XFL champion (2001); 2001 All-XFL Team; 3× CFL All-Star (2003, 2004, 2009); 2× CFL East All-Star (2003, 2004); CFL West All-Star (2009); BCS national champion (1998)
- Stats at CFL.ca (archive)
- Canadian Football Hall of Fame (Class of 2025)

Jeremaine Arnelle Copeland (born February 19, 1977) is an American former professional football wide receiver. He played with the Montreal Alouettes, Calgary Stampeders, and Toronto Argonauts of the Canadian Football League (CFL) as well as in the XFL and NFL Europe. He was inducted into the Canadian Football Hall of Fame in 2025.

== Early life ==
Copeland was born in Harriman, Tennessee. He attended Harriman High School, where he played for the Blue Devils high school football team. While at Harriman, Copeland played at both quarterback and running back. During his career, he was named 2A Player of the Year and the Lawrenceburg Quarterback Club East Tennessee Player of the Year, while also earning All-State and All-Region honors. He set a school record with 65 total touchdowns and 454 total points. As a senior, he rushed 166 times for 1,503 yards and 22 touchdowns while completing 51 of 115 passes for 921 yards and nine touchdowns. On defense, he played safety, recording 123 tackles and 11 interceptions. As a junior, he rushed for 1,110 yards, and as a sophomore, he added 810 rushing yards. In basketball, Copeland averaged 27 points and seven rebounds per game. He also competed in track and field, finishing fourth in the state decathlon as a junior.

== College career ==
Copeland attended the University of Tennessee, where he played under head coach Phillip Fulmer from the 1995 season to the 1998 season.

As a freshman in 1995, he split time with reserve quarterback Jeremy Bates behind starter Peyton Manning. He appeared in seven games, completing five of seven passes for 49 yards, while also ranking third on the team with 73 rushing yards and two touchdowns. He made his collegiate debut against Florida, rushing for 35 yards and a touchdown in the loss. The following week, he scored another rushing touchdown in a 52–14 victory over Mississippi State.

In 1996, he appeared in all 12 games for the Volunteers. He served as the primary backup to Manning, while also contributing as a wide receiver and punt returner. At quarterback, he completed 10 of 15 passes for 85 yards, while adding 72 rushing yards and two touchdowns on 17 carries. As a receiver, he caught 16 passes for 191 yards, and he also returned 11 punts for 113 yards. He recorded at least one reception in nine of the 12 games.

In 1997, he transitioned to wide receiver as Tee Martin moved into the backup role behind Manning. He appeared in all 13 games with six starts and recorded a reception in every game. Against Southern Miss, he had a career-high 11 receptions for 137 yards in a 44–20 victory. He finished the season with 62 receptions for 762 yards and nine touchdowns.

As a senior in 1998, Copeland recorded 29 receptions for 455 yards and one touchdown as Tennessee finished with a 13–0 record and captured the national championship. The Volunteers secured the title with a 23–16 victory over Florida State in the 1999 Fiesta Bowl, in which Copeland recorded one reception for 15 yards. For his career, he totaled 103 receptions for 1,361 yards and 10 touchdowns. As a quarterback, he completed 17 of 24 passes for 199 yards, while also rushing for 145 yards and four touchdowns. He also returned 34 punts for 269 yards, averaging 7.9 yards per return.

== Professional career ==
Copeland played a year of NFL Europe football for the Barcelona Dragons. He ended the season with a team leading 74 receptions for 821 yards, for an 11.1 yards per reception average, and six touchdowns.

Copeland began his CFL career with the Montreal Alouettes in 2001 and played six games. During that season, he played at wide receiver with the XFL's champion Los Angeles Xtreme. He scored a 19-yard receiving touchdown in the championship game. After beginning the 2002 season in the Dallas Cowboys' training camp, Copeland returned to the Alouettes and contributed to their Grey Cup championship that year. Copeland picked up CFL all-star honours in 2003 after piling up 99 receptions and 1,757 receiving yards. Along with teammate slotback Ben Cahoon, Copeland set a CFL record for most receiving yards by two teammates, amassing 3,318 yards between them. In 2004, Copeland was one of four receivers with the Alouettes to eclipse the 1,000-yard receiving mark (the others were Cahoon, Thyron Anderson, and Kwame Cavil).

In 2005, Copeland was lured west to join the Calgary Stampeders after he entered free agency. Although his statistics did not reach the same levels as those achieved with the Alouettes, Copeland became infamous for their elaborate touchdown celebrations, including a "human bicycle" during the 2005 season, and the "bobsled" at the endzone pylon during the 2006 season. On November 23, 2008, Copeland and teammates of the Calgary Stampeders won the Grey Cup against the hosting Montreal Alouettes, 22–14. In 2009, Copeland enjoyed his best season since 2003 when he recorded 1,235 receiving yards and led the league with 12 receiving touchdowns, earning CFL all-star honours that year.

On February 17, 2010, Copeland was traded to the Toronto Argonauts in exchange for wide receiver P. K. Sam. He was elected as the team's offensive captain, leading an inexperienced receiving corps and being a crutch for inexperienced CFL quarterback Cleo Lemon. On November 3, 2011, he surpassed the 10,000 career receiving yards mark, becoming the 15th CFL player to reach the milestone.

On January 25, 2012, Copeland officially retired from the CFL after 11 seasons in professional football.

Copeland was announced as a member of the Canadian Football Hall of Fame 2025 class on June 12, 2025.

== Coaching career ==
After announcing his retirement from professional football, Copeland was named the wide receivers coach of the Hamilton Tiger-Cats, joining former offensive coordinator George Cortez who was the team's head coach at the time. Following the 2012 season, Copeland left the Tiger-Cats to complete his degree at the University of Tennessee.

On February 20, 2015, the Saskatchewan Roughriders announced that Copeland would be their new receivers coach.

== Career statistics ==
=== CFL ===
Receiving		Regular season						Playoffs
Year	Team	Games	No.	Yards	Avg	Long	TD	Games	No.	Yards	Avg	Long	TD
2001	MTL	7	13	182	14.0	26	1
2002	MTL	5	18	352	19.6	41	4	2	5	119	23.8	47	1
2003	MTL	18	99	1,757	17.7	57	14	2	14	185	13.2	26	0
2004	MTL	16	83	1,154	13.9	42	10	1	7	98	14.0	42	0
2005	CGY	18	64	1,211	18.9	70	8	1	4	88	22.0	48	0
2006	CGY	18	54	978	18.1	70	6	1	3	63	21.0	28	0
2007	CGY	18	67	1,110	16.6	84	10	1	3	44	14.7	20	0
2008	CGY	18	52	763	14.7	60	7	2	10	96	9.6	29	0
2009	CGY	18	81	1,235	15.2	57	12	2	8	93	11.6	19	1
2010	TOR	14	48	639	13.3	50	3	2	11	121	11.0	28	1
2011	TOR	18	43	633	14.7	45	0	Team did not qualify
MTL totals		46	213	3,445	16.2	57	29	5	26	402	15.5	47	1
CGY totals		90	318	5,297	16.7	84	43	7	28	384	13.7	48	1
TOR totals		32	91	1,272	14.0	50	3	2	11	121	11.0	28	1
CFL totals		168	622	10,014	16.1	84	75	14	65	907	14.0	48	3

=== NFLE ===
Regular season

Year	Team	Games		Receiving				
Year	Team	GP	GS	Rec	Yds	Avg	Lng	TD
2000	Barcelona	10	10	74	821	11.1	42	6
Career		10	10	74	821	11.1	42	6

=== XFL ===
Regular season

Year	Team	Games		Receiving				
Year	Team	GP	GS	Rec	Yds	Avg	Lng	TD
2001	LA	10	10	67	755	11.3	34	5
Career		10	10	67	755	11.3	34	5

Postseason

Year	Team	Games		Receiving				
Year	Team	GP	GS	Rec	Yds	Avg	Lng	TD
2001	LA	2	2	8	122	15.3	26	2
Career		2	2	8	122	15.3	26	2
