= Calvin Bannister =

American gridiron football player (born 1984)

Profile
- Position: Defensive back

Personal information
- Born: February 17, 1984 (age 42); Roanoke, Virginia, U.S.
- Listed height: 5 ft 8 in (1.73 m)
- Listed weight: 180 lb (82 kg)

Career information
- College: Hampton University
- NFL draft: 2007: undrafted

Career history
- 2007: Baltimore Ravens*
- 2007–2008: Calgary Stampeders
- 2009: BC Lions*
- * Offseason or practice squad member only

Awards and highlights
- Grey Cup champion (2008)
- Stats at CFL.ca (archive)

Calvin Bannister (born February 17, 1984) is an American former professional football defensive back. He was signed by the Baltimore Ravens as an undrafted free agent in 2007, but opted not to go to the Ravens training camp and signed with the Calgary Stampeders of the Canadian Football League (CFL) on June 10, where he became a starter. He also played for the BC Lions. He played college football at Hampton.

== Early life ==
Bannister went to William Fleming High School where he was a star in track, basketball, and football. He was named an All-Conference performer winning the 100-meter dash, 200-meter dash and 400-meter dash at the 2002 regional meet in track. He also earned state champion honors in the 400-meter dash. He was also named Defensive Player of the Year in football.
