= Joffrey Reynolds =

American gridiron football player (born 1979)

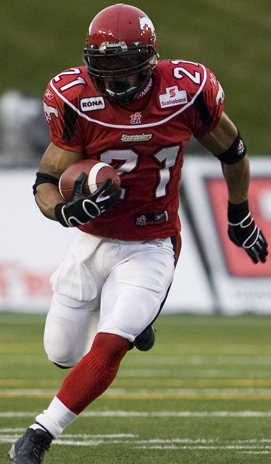
- Reynolds with the Calgary Stampeders in 2007

No. 21
- Position: Running back

Personal information
- Born: November 26, 1979 (age 46); Houston, Texas, U.S.
- Listed height: 5 ft 10 in (1.78 m)
- Listed weight: 218 lb (99 kg)

Career information
- High school: Robert E. Lee
- College: Houston

Career history
- 2003: St. Louis Rams
- 2004: Rhein Fire
- 2004: Cleveland Browns*
- 2004–2011: Calgary Stampeders
- * Offseason or practice squad member only

Awards and highlights
- Grey Cup champion (2008); Jeff Nicklin Memorial Trophy (2009); 4× Eddie James Memorial Trophy (2006, 2008–2010); 4× CFL All-Star (2005, 2006, 2008, 2009); 6× CFL West All-Star (2005–2010)
- Stats at Pro Football Reference
- Stats at CFL.ca (archive)

Joffrey Roy Reynolds (born November 26, 1979) is an American former professional football running back. He played eight years for the Calgary Stampeders of the Canadian Football League (CFL) and became Calgary's all-time leading rusher with 9,213 yards. For six consecutive years Reynolds rushed for over 1,000 yards. He was named a CFL All-Star four times and won a Grey Cup championship with the Stampeders in 2008. He attended the University of Houston. Reynolds also played for the St. Louis Rams of the National Football League (NFL).

== Early life and college career ==
Born in Houston, Texas, Reynolds attended Lee High School in Tyler and starred in football as a running back.

Following high school graduation, Reynolds played collegiately at the University of Houston. Reynolds played in 35 games for the Cougars, and carried the ball 640 times for 2,946 yards (for a 4.6 yards per carry average) and 23 touchdowns. Reynolds still holds the Cougars' record for single game yardage (41 carries for 300 yards and 4 touchdowns) in a 2002 game against East Carolina University.

== Professional career ==
=== NFL ===
Reynolds was signed by the St. Louis Rams as an undrafted free agent in 2003. With the Rams, he recorded 6 kickoff returns for 109 yards. Reynolds was released by the Rams and then picked up by the Cleveland Browns. The Browns released him after their training camp, but assigned him to the Rhein Fire of NFL Europa. Reynolds was then picked up by the New York Giants and was shortly released afterward.

=== CFL ===
Reynolds signed with the Calgary Stampeders of the Canadian Football League in 2004 and was a fixture in the Stamps' backfield. Reynolds was named a CFL All-Star three times (2005, 2006, 2008), as well as a Western Division All-Star four times between 2005 and 2008.

In 2008, Reynolds led the CFL in rushing with 1310 yards (on 227 carries, scoring 10 rushing touchdowns.) The Calgary Stampeders became the Grey Cup Champions, defeating the hosting Montreal Alouettes, 22–14. On July 24, 2009, in a game against the B.C. Lions, he rushed for 131 yards and surpassed Willie Burden as the Stampeders' number 4 all-time rusher.

During the 2011 season, Reynolds' production began to curtail and he was eventually replaced as the team's starting running back. On January 23, 2012, in the following off-season, he was released by the Stampeders after they could not secure a trade for him. Reynolds is the Calgary Stampeders all-time rushing leader with 9,213 yards.

== CFL career statistics ==
Rushing		Regular season						Playoffs
Year	Team	Games	No.	Yards	Avg	Long	TD	Games	No.	Yards	Avg	Long	TD
2004	CGY	5	90	497	5.5	55	2	Team did not qualify
2005	CGY	18	247	1,453	5.9	46	8	1	12	83	6.9	38	1
2006	CGY	18	259	1,541	5.9	53	9	1	15	55	3.7	16	0
2007	CGY	17	214	1,231	5.8	46	2	1	5	11	2.2	6	0
2008	CGY	18	227	1,310	5.8	50	10	2	21	72	3.4	12	0
2009	CGY	18	235	1,504	6.4	38	11	2	30	217	7.2	27	1
2010	CGY	18	217	1,200	5.5	32	8	1	10	52	5.2	16	0
2011	CGY	13	101	477	4.7	26	3	0	0	0	0.0	0	0
CFL totals		125	1,590	9,213	5.8	55	53	8	93	490	5.3	38	2

== Legal trouble ==
In July 2012 Kaitlin Ward, Reynolds' girlfriend, a basketball player, accused him of assault and said that he tackled her and tried to choke her in a bar. He was convicted and given 90 days in the Calgary jail. and was prohibited from drinking alcohol. After conviction, he was given probation on July 4, which he allegedly violated. The prosecutor, Hyatt Mograbee, asked the court to sentence Reynolds to two to three years of prison. It later became evident that Reynolds had not breached his probation due to the fact that his probation officer was not assigned to him during May 29 and 30. Later, judge Harry Van Harten agreed to release Reynolds on a free bail, but asked him to report his probation condition, which he needed to fulfill in two years.
