= Milt Collins =

American gridiron football player (born 1985)

No. 14, 31, 15
- Position: Defensive back

Personal information
- Born: March 9, 1985 (age 41); New Orleans, Louisiana, U.S.
- Listed height: 6 ft 1 in (1.85 m)
- Listed weight: 182 lb (83 kg)

Career information
- High school: O. Perry Walker (New Orleans, Louisiana)
- College: Ole Miss

Career history
- 2008–2011: Calgary Stampeders
- 2011–2012: Hamilton Tiger-Cats
- 2012–2013: Saskatchewan Roughriders

Awards and highlights
- Grey Cup champion (2008)
- Stats at CFL.ca

Milton Collins (born March 9, 1985) is an American former professional football defensive back who played in the Canadian Football League. He was signed by the Calgary Stampeders as an undrafted free agent in 2008. He was released from the Hamilton Tiger-Cats during training camp in June 2012 after only playing a handful of games with the team. He played college football at Jones County Junior College and Ole Miss.
