= Cornelius Anthony =

American gridiron football player (born 1978)

No. 57
- Position: Linebacker

Personal information
- Born: July 3, 1978 (age 48); Pineville, Louisiana, U.S.
- Listed height: 6 ft 0 in (1.83 m)
- Listed weight: 235 lb (107 kg)

Career information
- High school: Elkins (Missouri City, Texas)
- College: Texas A&M

Career history
- Washington Redskins (2001)*; Barcelona Dragons (2002); San Francisco 49ers (2002–2003); Denver Broncos (2004)*; Calgary Stampeders (2005–2007); Hamilton Tiger-Cats (2008)
- * Offseason or practice squad member only
- Stats at Pro Football Reference
- Stats at CFL.ca (archive)

Cornelius Anthony (born July 3, 1978) is an American former professional football player who was a linebacker in the National Football League (NFL) and Canadian Football League (CFL). He played college football for the Texas A&M Aggies and was signed by the Washington Redskins as an undrafted free agent in 2001.

Anthony also played for the Calgary Stampeders and Hamilton Tiger-Cats.

== Early life ==
He starred at Elkins High School in Missouri City, Texas, where he earned District 16-5A Defensive MVP honors after posting 163 total tackles (25 for a loss), three interceptions and three fumble recoveries in addition to playing running back on offense. Also earned All-Greater Houston honors, was a finalist for the Houston Touchdown Club Defensive Player of the Year, and was an honorable mention all-state selection.

== College career ==
Anthony attended Texas A&M University, where he was a three-year starter. He finished his career with six sacks, 288 tackles, and a forced fumble. In a game against Nebraska during his senior year, he posted 18 tackles.

== Professional career ==
=== NFL ===
Anthony was signed as a free agent to the Washington Redskins, but did not appear in a game with the club. He was assigned to NFL Europe, where he played for the Barcelona Dragons. He finished the year with two sacks, a team-leading 50 tackles, a forced fumble, and an interception. He then returned to the U.S., where he played in 17 games over the 2003 and 2004 seasons for the San Francisco 49ers. After being released by the 49ers, he was signed and subsequently released by the Denver Broncos.

=== CFL ===
Signed as a free agent on May 10, 2005, with the Calgary Stampeders. Appeared in 5 games during the 2005 season and recorded 3 special teams tackles. Became a starter during the 2006 season for Calgary. Finished the season with 40 defensive tackles, six quarterback sacks, two special team tackles, two tackles for a loss, one fumble recovery and one interception. Had his best professional season in 2007, making 56 tackles, recording 8 sacks, and recovering a fumble.
