= Neil Ternovatsky =

Canadian football player (born 1984)

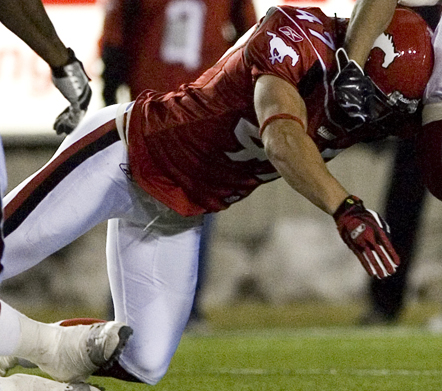
- Ternovatsky with the Calgary Stampeders in 2007

No. 47
- Position: Linebacker

Personal information
- Born: October 15, 1984 (age 42); Winnipeg, Manitoba, Canada
- Listed height: 6 ft 2 in (1.88 m)
- Listed weight: 230 lb (104 kg)

Career information
- College: Alberta
- NFL draft: 2006: undrafted

Career history
- Edmonton Eskimos (2006)*; Calgary Stampeders (2007–2008); Winnipeg Blue Bombers (2009)*
- * Offseason or practice squad member only

Awards and highlights
- Grey Cup champion (2008)
- Stats at CFL.ca (archive)

Neil Ternovatsky (born October 15, 1984) is a Canadian former professional football linebacker. He was signed by the Edmonton Eskimos as an undrafted free agent in 2006. He played CIS football for the Alberta Golden Bears, while studying at the University of Alberta (U of A) for a BA in Economics (which he completed during his CFL career). Ternovatsky was also a member of the Calgary Stampeders, including their 2008 Grey Cup championship season, and finished his career on the practice roster with the 2009 Winnipeg Blue Bombers. He graduated with an MBA from U of A in 2012; as of 2026 he is an Associate Vice President at ATB Financial.
