= Demetris Summers =

American gridiron football player (born 1983)

No. 32
- Position: Running back

Personal information
- Born: October 12, 1983 (age 43); Lexington, South Carolina, U.S.
- Listed height: 6 ft 1 in (1.85 m)
- Listed weight: 200 lb (91 kg)

Career information
- High school: Lexington (SC)
- College: South Carolina
- NFL draft: 2006: undrafted

Career history
- Dallas Cowboys (2006)*; Calgary Stampeders (2008–2010)
- * Offseason or practice squad member only

Awards and highlights
- Grey Cup champion (96th); SEC All-Freshman (2003)
- Stats at CFL.ca (archive)

Demetris Summers (born October 12, 1983) is an American former professional football running back who played for the Calgary Stampeders of the Canadian Football League (CFL). He was released by the team in April 2010.

He was signed by the Dallas Cowboys as an undrafted free agent in 2006. He played college football at South Carolina before being expelled from the team March 1, 2005 after the coaching change and did not play anywhere in the 2005 season before entering early for the 2006 NFL draft, where he was undrafted.

Summers won the 96th Grey Cup as a member of the Stampeders.

Summers is considered one of the biggest recruiting busts in college football history, and is currently in prison.

== Early life ==
Summers was a record setting running back at Lexington High School and was recruited as the No. 3 running back in the nation. He also was a four-year starter in basketball, his freshman year he tipped in a missed shot with 0.6 seconds left to defeat Dorman High School 46–45 in the Upper State Championship. Lexington would go on to win the state championship over Marlboro County High School. On October 10, 2014, Summers became a new member of the Lexington Wildcat Hall of Fame.
