= Pat MacDonald (gridiron football) =

Canadian football player (born 1982)

Patrick MacDonald
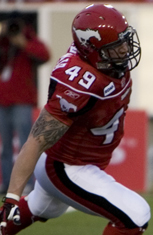
- MacDonald with the Calgary Stampeders in 2007

No. 49, 92, 93
- Position: Defensive lineman

Personal information
- Born: February 20, 1982 (age 44); Toronto, Ontario, Canada
- Listed height: 6 ft 3 in (1.91 m)
- Listed weight: 247 lb (112 kg)

Career information
- College: Alberta
- NFL draft: 2007: undrafted
- CFL draft: 2007: 3rd round, 21st overall pick

Career history
- New Orleans Saints (2007)*; Calgary Stampeders (2007–2009); Carolina Panthers (2009)*; Winnipeg Blue Bombers (2009); Seattle Seahawks (2010)*; Montreal Alouettes (2010)
- * Offseason or practice squad member only

Awards and highlights
- 2× Grey Cup champion (2008, 2010)
- Stats at CFL.ca (archive)

Patrick MacDonald (born February 20, 1982) is a Canadian former professional football player who was a defensive lineman in the Canadian Football League (CFL). He was signed by the New Orleans Saints as an undrafted free agent in 2007 and was the second player in the school's history to go to the NFL. He was selected by the Calgary Stampeders in the third round of the 2007 CFL draft. He played college football at University of Alberta.

MacDonald was also a member of the Carolina Panthers, Winnipeg Blue Bombers, Seattle Seahawks and Montreal Alouettes, winning a Grey Cup in 2008 and 2010.

Patrick MacDonald is now an entrepreneur and youth football coach living in Victoria, Canada with his family.
