= Robert Rodriguez (gridiron football) =

American football coach (born 1981)

Personal information
- Born: December 25, 1981 (age 44); El Paso, Texas, U.S.

Career information
- College: UTEP

Career history

Playing
- Cologne Centurions (2006); Calgary Stampeders (2006–2007)

Coaching
- UTEP (2008–2009) Assistant; UTEP (2010–2014) Linebackers coach; Minnesota Vikings (2015–2019) Assistant defensive line coach; Arizona State (2020–2022) Defensive line coach; Arizona Cardinals (2023–2024) Outside linebackers coach

Awards and highlights
- WAC Defensive Player of the Year (2004)

Robert J. Rodriguez is an American football coach and former player who is the outside linebackers coach for the Arizona Cardinals of the National Football League (NFL). He most recently was the defensive line coach for the Arizona State University Sun Devils football team of the Pac-12 Conference in the NCAA Division I Football Bowl Subdivision (FBS). Rodriguez is a graduate of UTEP, where he played linebacker during the early 2000s and later return to coach the defense in 2008. Rodriguez would then coach in the National Football League as an assistant defensive coach for the Minnesota Vikings in 2015.

== Early years and playing career ==
Rodriguez attended Montwood High School in El Paso, Texas and lettered in both football and basketball. He was a standout running back for Montwood and was the El Paso Times Offensive Player of the Year as well as All City first team for the 1999 season. He signed a football scholarship with UTEP, choosing to continue his playing career in his hometown.

Rodriguez ranks fifth on the all-time UTEP tackle chart with 443 tackles, including 33 for losses. He led the Western Athletic Conference (WAC) in tackles in three of his four seasons at UTEP (2001, 2003, 2004). Rodriguez was named the WAC Defensive Player of the Year in 2004 after being credited with 121 tackles, including 16 tackles for losses. He was the defensive captain of the 2004 UTEP team that was ranked in the AP Top 25 for multiple weeks during the 2004 season and that played the University of Colorado in the EV1.net Houston Bowl. In 2001, Rodriguez was voted 1st team Freshman All-America Linebacker by the Football Writers Association of America (FWAA).

After his final game with UTEP, Rodriguez was invited to play in the East West Shrine Game, one of the most prestigious college all-star games at the time. The game was played at AT&T Park in San Francisco.

Rodriguez signed with the Tennessee Titans of the National Football League in April 2005 as an undrafted free agent. He played in all four pre-season games before being released by the team on the final cut prior to the regular season. He was signed by the Carolina Panthers practice squad in early January 2006. The Panthers advanced to the 2006 NFC Championship game, where they lost to the Seattle Seahawks. Rodriguez was released following the season. Subsequently, he signed as a free agent with the Cologne Centurions of NFL Europe for the 2006 season. He signed with the Calgary Stampeders of the Canadian Football League in the summer of 2006 and played with the Stampeders through 2007.

== Coaching career ==
=== UTEP ===
Rodriguez returned to his alma mater, UTEP, as the defensive program coordinator for the 2008 and 2009 seasons. He was elevated to the position of linebackers coach in 2010. In his first season as linebackers coach in 2010, Rodriguez coached four of the Miners' top seven tacklers. Those four combined to lead the team in tackles seven times in 13 games.

=== Minnesota Vikings ===
Rodriguez joined the Minnesota Vikings of the National Football League in 2015 serving as the Assistant Defensive Line Coach under the tutelage of Defensive Line Coach Andre Patterson until the end of the 2019 football season. For five consecutive seasons, the Viking defense ranked in the top half of the NFL in total defense and in scoring defense during Rodriguez's tenure naming several defensive linemen All-Pro selections and earning Pro Bowl trips each year.

=== Arizona State ===
In 2020, Rodriguez was hired by Arizona State University to coach the football team's defensive line under head coach Herm Edwards.

=== Arizona Cardinals ===
On February 25, 2023, Rodriguez was hired by the Arizona Cardinals to serve as the team's outside linebackers coach.

== Personal life ==
Rodriguez is married to the former Holly Taylor, who played soccer for UTEP from 2000 to 2004 and now practices law. The couple resides in Tempe, Arizona.

He has remained a popular figure in the El Paso area and was voted El Paso's Favorite Athlete in the El Paso Times "Best of the Border" Reader Poll in 2007. Rodriguez has been inducted into the inaugural Montwood High School Ring of Honor in 2006 and into the El Paso Athletic Hall of Fame in 2018.
