= Terrence Patrick =

American gridiron football player (born 1982)

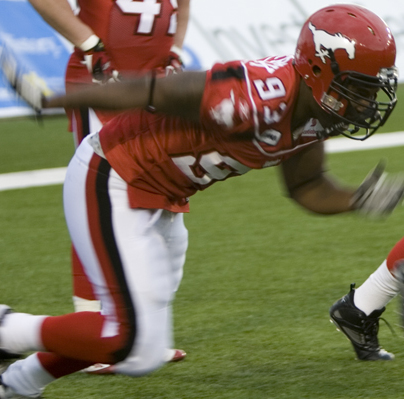
- Patrick with the Calgary Stampeders in 2007

Profile
- Position: Defensive lineman

Personal information
- Born: July 7, 1982 (age 44)
- Listed height: 6 ft 5 in (1.96 m)
- Listed weight: 260 lb (118 kg)

Career information
- High school: Mount Saint Michael (The Bronx, New York)
- College: Mercyhurst

Career history
- 2005–2007: Calgary Stampeders
- 2008: Hamilton Tiger-Cats

Career statistics
- Tackles: 133
- Sacks: 16

Terrence Patrick (born July 7, 1982) is an American former professional football defensive end who played in the Canadian Football League (CFL). He played college football at Mercyhurst.

== Early life ==
Patrick was born in The Bronx and attended Mount Saint Michael Academy, where he played basketball and football. He was named All-Catholic High School Athletic Association in football as a junior and senior.

== College career ==
Patrick played four seasons for the Mercyhurst Lakers. He was named honorable mention All-Great Lakes Intercollegiate Athletic Conference (GLIAC) in his junior season after recording 36 tackles with 4.5 sacks. As a senior he was named second team All-GLIAC after recording 21.0 tackles for loss and 8.5 sacks. Patrick finished his collegiate career with 152 tackles, 36 tackles for loss and 17 sacks.

== Professional career ==
Patrick was signed by the Calgary Stampeders of the Canadian Football League (CFL) in 2005. He made 20 defensive tackles, three tackles for a loss and had two sacks as a rookie. He was cut by Calgary at the end of training camp in 2008. He made 93 defensive tackles with 13 sacks over 49 games with the Stampeders. Patrick was signed by the Hamilton Tiger-Cats on July 1, 2008. He finished the season with 37 tackles and three sacks and was released at the end of the season. Patrick finished his CFL career with 133 total tackles, 17 sacks and three fumbles recovered in 66 games.
