= Marcus Parker =

American gridiron football player (born 1983)

No. 94
- Position: Defensive tackle

Personal information
- Born: May 18, 1983 (age 43); Dallas, Texas, U.S.
- Listed height: 6 ft 2 in (1.88 m)
- Listed weight: 285 lb (129 kg)

Career information
- College: New Mexico (2001–2005)
- NFL draft: 2006: undrafted

Career history
- Detroit Lions (2006)*; Calgary Stampeders (2007–2008); Chicago Rush (2011)
- * Offseason or practice squad member only

Awards and highlights
- Grey Cup champion (2008); First-team All-MW (2004)
- Stats at CFL.ca (archive)
- Stats at ArenaFan.com

Marcus Parker (born May 18, 1983) is an American former professional football defensive tackle who played for the Calgary Stampeders of the Canadian Football League (CFL). He was signed by the Detroit Lions as an undrafted free agent in 2006. He played college football at New Mexico from 2002 to 2005 after being redshirted in 2001. Parker also played for the Chicago Rush of the Arena Football League.

Parker was signed by the Lions on August 9, 2006. He was released on August 27, re-signed again on August 30, and waived/injured on September 3. He was released again on September 8, 2006. He later re-signed with the Lions on April 6, 2007 but was released on June 14, 2007.
