= Justin Phillips (Canadian football) =

Canadian football player (born 1985)

No. 44
- Position: Defensive end

Personal information
- Born: April 24, 1985 (age 41); Ottawa, Ontario, Canada
- Listed height: 6 ft 1 in (1.85 m)
- Listed weight: 210 lb (95 kg)

Career information
- University: Wilfrid Laurier
- CFL draft: 2007: 1st round, 5th overall pick

Career history
- 2007–2013: Calgary Stampeders
- 2014–2015: Ottawa Redblacks

Awards and highlights
- Grey Cup champion (2008)
- Stats at CFL.ca

Justin Phillips (born April 24, 1985) is a Canadian former professional football player who was a defensive end in the Canadian Football League (CFL). He was selected with the fifth overall pick in the 2007 CFL draft by the Calgary Stampeders. He played CIS Football with Wilfrid Laurier University.
