= Brett Ralph =

Canadian football player (born 1982)

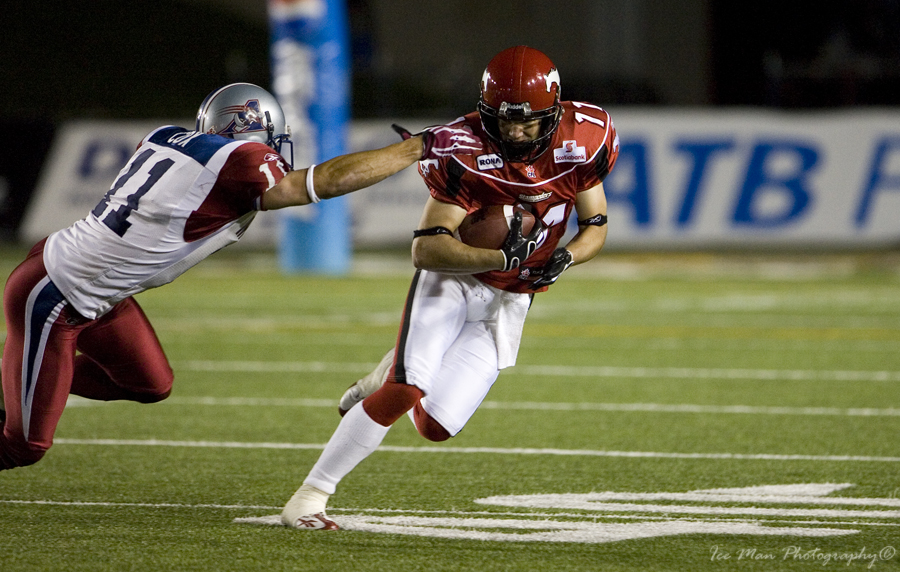
- Ralph with the Calgary Stampeders in 2007

No. 11
- Positions: Wide receiver, Slotback

Personal information
- Born: March 3, 1982 (age 44); Raymond, Alberta, Canada
- Listed height: 5 ft 10 in (1.78 m)
- Listed weight: 175 lb (79 kg)

Career information
- College: Alberta
- CFL draft: 2005: 6th round, 45th overall pick

Career history
- 2005–2009: Calgary Stampeders

Awards and highlights
- Grey Cup champion (2008)
- Stats at CFL.ca

Brett Ralph (born March 3, 1982) is a Canadian former professional football receiver who played for the Calgary Stampeders of the Canadian Football League (CFL). He is the younger brother of fellow CFL receiver Brock Ralph.

== Professional career ==
Ralph was drafted in the 2005 CFL draft in the 6th round by the Calgary Stampeders. He immediately became part of the team's receiving corps. In his rookie season he finished fourth in receiving on the team with 609 yards.

2006 was an off year for him, recording only seven receptions for 76 yards, finishing eighth on the team.

2007 was a return to form, catching 53 passes for 695 yards. His duties on the team were expanded to include holding for placekicks. He threw a touchdown on a fake field goal play in the Stampeders game against the Argonauts on July 21.

On May 31, 2010, Ralph announced his retirement from professional football in order to concentrate on his education to become a teacher.

== Career statistics ==
			Rushing						Receiving
Year	League	Team	Att.	Yards	Avg	Long	TD	Fumbles	No.	Yards	Avg	Long	TD
2005	CFL	Calgary Stampeders	0	0	0	0	0	0	34	609	17.9	61	3
2006	CFL	Calgary Stampeders	0	0	0	0	0	0	7	76	10.9	24	0
2007	CFL	Calgary Stampeders	5	30	6.0	24	0	?	53	695	13.1	39	3
2008	CFL	Calgary Stampeders	?	?	?	?	?	?	52	724	13.9	65	5
2009	CFL	Calgary Stampeders	?	?	?	?	?	?	29	403	13.9	62	1
Totals			?	?	?	?	?	?	175	2507	14.3	65	12
