= Burke Dales =

Canadian football player (1977–2024)

No. 30
- Position: Punter

Personal information
- Born: February 16, 1977; Collingwood, Ontario, Canada
- Died: January 6, 2024 (aged 46); Calgary, Alberta, Canada
- Listed height: 6 ft 3 in (1.91 m)
- Listed weight: 225 lb (102 kg)

Career information
- College: Concordia
- NFL draft: 2002: undrafted

Career history
- 2002: Pittsburgh Steelers*
- 2003: Montreal Alouettes*
- 2005–2011: Calgary Stampeders
- 2012–2013: Edmonton Eskimos
- 2013: Montreal Alouettes
- * Offseason or practice squad member only

Awards and highlights
- Grey Cup champion (2008); 2× CFL All-Star (2010, 2011); 4× CFL West All-Star (2006, 2009, 2010, 2011); 3× Quebec Intercollegiate Football Conference All-Star; All-Canadian team (2001)
- Stats at CFL.ca

Burke Dales (February 16, 1977 – January 6, 2024) was a Canadian professional football player who was a punter in the Canadian Football League (CFL). He played CIS Football with the Concordia Stingers. He was signed by the Pittsburgh Steelers as an undrafted free agent in 2002.

Over his nine-year career, Dales played for the Calgary Stampeders, Edmonton Eskimos, and Montreal Alouettes. Dales was born in Collingwood, Ontario, and raised in Brockville, Ontario.

== Professional career ==
=== Pittsburgh Steelers ===
After playing at Concordia University, Dales attended the Pittsburgh Steelers 2002 training camp. He also tried to make the team as a kick-off specialist. When he placekicked, he used the straight-on style which had not been seen in the NFL since the 1980s.

=== Montreal Alouettes ===
Dales attended Montreal Alouettes's 2003 training camp and sat out the remainder of the 2003 and 2004 seasons before signing with Calgary in 2005.

=== Calgary Stampeders ===
Dales was signed as a free agent on March 8, 2005, by the Calgary Stampeders.

Prior to the Stampeders' 96th Grey Cup victory in 2008, Dales was offered a new contract to re-sign with Calgary for the 2009 CFL season but withheld signing until seeing if he could get interest from a National Football League team.

Dales re-signed with the Stampeders on March 24, 2009, after failing to gain interest from NFL teams and a reportedly higher offer from the Winnipeg Blue Bombers would have meant losing his off-season employment.

=== Edmonton Eskimos ===
After becoming a free agent in 2012, Dales signed with the Edmonton Eskimos on February 19, 2012.

On July 22, 2013, he was released by the Eskimos.

=== Montreal Alouettes ===
On October 30, 2013, Dales was signed again by the Montreal Alouettes.

Dales announced his retirement on May 16, 2014.

== Personal life and death ==
Dales' sister, Stacey, is a former Women's National Basketball Association player who currently works as a reporter for NFL Network. His cousin Jason Arnott played 18 seasons in the National Hockey League.

Dales died in January 2024, at the age of 46.
