= J. R. Ruffin =

American gridiron football player (born 1982)

Profile
- Position: Defensive back

Personal information
- Born: July 28, 1982 (age 44); Detroit, Michigan, U.S.
- Listed height: 6 ft 0 in (1.83 m)
- Listed weight: 182 lb (83 kg)

Career information
- College: Idaho
- NFL draft: 2006: undrafted

Career history
- Calgary Stampeders (2006–2008); Milwaukee Mustangs (2011); BC Lions (2011)

Awards and highlights
- 2× Grey Cup champion (2008, 2011)
- Stats at CFL.ca (archive)

J. R. Ruffin (born July 28, 1982) is an American former professional football defensive back. He was signed by the Calgary Stampeders as an undrafted free agent in 2006. He played college football at Idaho.
