= Derek Armstrong (gridiron football) =

Canadian football player (born 1981)

No. 60
- Position: Guard

Personal information
- Born: June 19, 1981 (age 45); Perth, Ontario, Canada
- Listed height: 6 ft 2 in (1.88 m)
- Listed weight: 300 lb (136 kg)

Career information
- University: St. Francis Xavier
- CFL draft: 2006: 5th round, 38th overall pick

Career history
- Calgary Stampeders (2006–2009); Winnipeg Blue Bombers (2009)

Awards and highlights
- Grey Cup champion (2008); 2003 and 2005 AUS Linemen of the Year; 2003 CIS All-Canadian
- Stats at CFL.ca (archive)

Derek Armstrong (born June 19, 1981) is a Canadian former professional football guard. He was drafted in the fifth round with the 38th overall pick in the 2006 CFL draft by the Calgary Stampeders. He played CIS Football with St. Francis Xavier University. During the 2009 CFL season the Calgary Stampeders traded defensive lineman Odell Willis and receivers Titus Ryan, and Jabari Arthur to the Winnipeg Blue Bombers in exchange for receivers Romby Bryant and Arjei Franklin. These two teams also agreed that Armstrong would be involved in the trade, but would remain Calgary property until the end of the season, so following the 2009 season Armstrong was traded to Winnipeg.
