= Godfrey Ellis =

Bahamian-born Canadian football guard

No. 61
- Position: Guard

Personal information
- Born: April 3, 1982 (age 44); Nassau, Bahamas
- Listed height: 6 ft 2 in (1.88 m)
- Listed weight: 290 lb (132 kg)

Career information
- University: Acadia
- CFL draft: 2005: 2nd round, 10th overall pick

Career history
- 2005–2010: Calgary Stampeders

Awards and highlights
- Grey Cup champion (2008)
- Stats at CFL.ca (archive)

Godfrey Ellis
Medal record

Men's Athletics

Representing Bahamas

CAC Junior Championships (U17)
| Silver medal – second place | 1998 George Town | Shot put |

CARIFTA Games Youth (U17)
| Gold medal – first place | 1998 Port of Spain | Discus throw |
| Silver medal – second place | 1998 Port of Spain | Shot put |

Godfrey Ellis (born April 3, 1982) is a Bahamian-Canadian former professional football guard who played for the Calgary Stampeders of the Canadian Football League (CFL). He was drafted in the second round with the tenth overall pick in the 2005 CFL draft by the Calgary Stampeders. He played CIS Football with Acadia University.
