= Shannon James (gridiron football) =

American gridiron football player (born 1983)

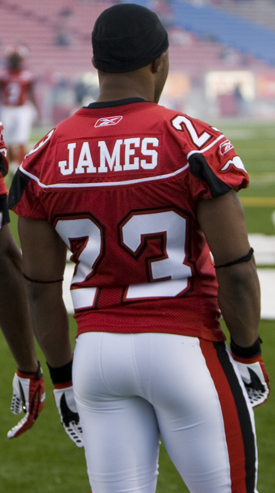
- James with the Calgary Stampeders in 2007

No. 23
- Position: Linebacker

Personal information
- Born: December 28, 1983 (age 42); Bridgeport, Connecticut, U.S.
- Listed height: 5 ft 10 in (1.78 m)
- Listed weight: 205 lb (93 kg)

Career information
- High school: Bunnell
- College: Massachusetts
- NFL draft: 2006: undrafted

Career history
- Baltimore Ravens (2006)*; Calgary Stampeders (2006–2009); Hamilton Tiger-Cats (2010)
- * Offseason or practice squad member only

Awards and highlights
- Grey Cup champion (2008)
- Stats at CFL.ca (archive)

Shannon James (born December 28, 1983) is an American former professional football linebacker who played in the Canadian Football League (CFL) with the Calgary Stampeders and Hamilton Tiger-Cats. He was signed by the Baltimore Ravens as an undrafted free agent in 2006. He played college football at the University of Massachusetts Amherst.
