= 2010 Winnipeg Blue Bombers season =

Canadian football team season

- General manager: Joe Mack
- Head coach: Paul LaPolice
- Home stadium: Canad Inns Stadium

Results
- Record: 4–14
- Division place: 4th, East
- Playoffs: did not qualify

Uniform

The 2010 Winnipeg Blue Bombers season was the 53rd season for the team in the Canadian Football League (CFL) and their 78th overall. The Blue Bombers finished the year in fourth place in the East Division with a 4–14 record and failed to make the playoffs. The team clinched their third consecutive losing season on October 2, 2010 and were eliminated from post-season contention on Oct 23, 2010 making this the second consecutive season that they have missed the playoffs.

After their Week 18 loss against the Edmonton Eskimos, the 2010 Blue Bombers set a CFL record for most losses by four points or less in one season with a remarkable eight such losses. This sets the record after the 1993 Ottawa Rough Riders had seven such losses during their season and when the BC Lions also had seven of these losses in 1996. After losing the final game of the season against the Stampeders, the Blue Bombers finished the year losing nine games by four points or less and ten by a touchdown or less.

== Offseason ==
=== CFL draft ===
Round	Pick	Player	Position	School/Club team
2	9	Cory Watson	SB	Concordia
4	28	Christopher Smith	LB	Queen's
4	29	Anthony Woodson	RB	Calgary
6	45	Christopher Greaves	DL	Western

== Preseason ==
Week	Date	Opponent	Score	Result	Attendance	Record
A	Sun, June 13	Montreal Alouettes	34–10	Win	28,792	1–0
B	Sun, June 20	at Hamilton Tiger-Cats	38–20	Loss	19,645	1–1

== Regular season ==
=== Season standings ===
East Division
Team	GP	W	L	T	PF	PA	Pts	
Montreal Alouettes	18	12	6	0	521	475	24	Details
Hamilton Tiger-Cats	18	9	9	0	481	450	18	Details
Toronto Argonauts	18	9	9	0	373	442	18	Details
Winnipeg Blue Bombers	18	4	14	0	464	485	8	Details

=== Season schedule ===
Week	Date	Opponent	Score	Result	Attendance	Record
1	Fri, July 2	Hamilton Tiger-Cats	49–29	Win	26,302	1–0
2	Fri, July 9	Toronto Argonauts	36–34	Loss	28,009	1–1
3	Fri, July 16	at Hamilton Tiger-Cats	28–7	Loss	21,408	1–2
4	Sat, July 24	Edmonton Eskimos	47–21	Win	26,041	2–2
5	Sat, July 31	at Calgary Stampeders	23–20	Loss	30,150	2–3
6	Sat, Aug 7	at Hamilton Tiger-Cats	29–22	Loss	23,653	2–4
7	Fri, Aug 13	Hamilton Tiger-Cats	39–28	Loss	27,892	2–5
8	Thurs, Aug 19	at Montreal Alouettes	39–17	Loss	25,012	2–6
9	Bye					2–6
10	Sun, Sept 5	at Saskatchewan Roughriders	27–23	Loss	30,048	2–7
11	Sun, Sept 12	Saskatchewan Roughriders	31–2	Win	29,533	3–7
12	Sun, Sept 19	at Toronto Argonauts	17–13	Loss	19,662	3–8
13	Fri, Sept 24	Montreal Alouettes	44–40	Loss	26,154	3–9
14	Sat, Oct 2	at BC Lions	16–14	Loss	23,186	3–10
15	Mon, Oct 11	BC Lions	47–35 (2OT)	Win	25,016	4–10
16	Sun, Oct 17	at Montreal Alouettes	22–19	Loss	25,012	4–11
17	Sat, Oct 23	Toronto Argonauts	27–8	Loss	23,446	4–12
18	Sat, Oct 30	at Edmonton Eskimos	16–13 (OT)	Loss	32,192	4–13
19	Fri, Nov 5	Calgary Stampeders	35–32	Loss	22,056	4–14

== Roster ==
2010 Winnipeg Blue Bombers final roster
Quarterbacks: 12 Zac Champion; 16 Joey Elliott; 13 Justin Goltz; Running backs: 34 Chris Garrett; 77 Jon Oosterhuis; 32 Fred Reid; 20 Andre Sadeghian; Receivers: 84 Greg Carr; 82 Terrence Edwards; 15 Aaron Hargreaves; 88 Markus Howell; 14 Terence Jeffers-Harris; 86 Scott McHenry; 81 Cory Watson	Offensive linemen: 68 Kelly Butler T; 59 Andre Douglas T; 61 Luke Fritz T; 64 Chris Greaves G; 60 Obby Khan C; 65 Steve Morley G; Defensive linemen: 97 Doug Brown DT; 53 Phillip Hunt DE; 56 Fernand Kashama DE; 94 Deji Oduwole DE; 93 Don Oramasionwu DT; 90 Dorian Smith DT; 40 Odell Willis DE	Linebackers: 38 Marcellus Bowman; 46 Merrill Johnson; 41 Clint Kent; 47 Pierre-Luc Labbé; 58 Joe Lobendahn; 51 Rico McCoy; 19 Chris Smith; Defensive backs: 20 Deon Beasley; 23 Jonathan Hefney; 2 Jovon Johnson; 31 Ian Logan; 18 Johnny Sears; 8 Brandon Stewart; 37 Alex Suber	Special teams: 52 Taylor Inglis LS; 17 Justin Palardy K; 9 Mike Renaud P/K; Reserve roster: 95 Moton Hopkins DT; 65 Matt Morencie G; Practice roster: 83 Josh Bishop SB; 67 Chris Kowalczuk G; 89 Jamayel Smith WR; 6 Frank Wilczynski QB; 59 Marlon Winn T	Injured List: 26 Yvenson Bernard RB (1 Game); 7 Alex Brink QB (9 Game); 25 Brady Browne DB (1 Game); 5 Keyuo Craver DB (9 Game); 50 Chris Cvetkovic LS (9 Game); 10 Chris Davis SB (1 Game); 55 Ryan Donnelly G/C (9 Game); 22 Shawn Gallant DB (9 Game); 27 Lavar Glover DB (9 Game); 43 James Green LB (9 Game); 69 Glenn January T (9 Game); 29 Jerry-Ralph Jules DB (9 Game); 3 Steven Jyles QB (9 Game); 57 Brendon LaBatte G (1 Game); 4 Buck Pierce QB (9 Game); 80 Brock Ralph SB (1 Game); 1 Courtney Smith LB (1 Game); 24 Daryl Stephenson FB (1 Game); 48 Remond Willis DE (1 Game); Italics indicate International player

== Coaching staff ==
Winnipeg Blue Bombers Staff
Front office: Owner – Community owned (non-profit corporation owned by members); President/CEO – Jim Bell; Chairman of board of governors – Ken Hildahl; Vice president and general manager of football operations – Joe Mack; Director of football operations – Ross Hodgkinson; Director of player personnel – Ken Moll; Head coaches: Head coach – Paul LaPolice; Offensive coaches: Offensive coordinator and quarterbacks – Jamie Barresi; Receivers – Chris Wiesehan; Offensive line – Pat DelMonaco	Defensive coaches: Defensive coordinator and assistant head coach – Kavis Reed; Defensive line – Richard Harris; Linebackers – Casey Creehan; Special teams coaches: Special teams coordinator – Kyle Walters; → Coaching staff

== Player stats ==
=== Passing ===
Player	Att	Comp	%	Yards	TD	INT	Rating
Steven Jyles	318	196	61.6	2804	19	7	100.9
Buck Pierce	120	80	66.7	1080	6	4	97.9
Joey Elliott	73	35	47.9	435	2	3	58.9
Alex Brink	40	15	37.5	130	0	1	36.5
Mike Renaud	2	1	50.0	27	0	0	100.0
Terrence Edwards	2	0	0.0	0	0	1	(−206.3)

=== Rushing ===
Player	Att	Yards	Avg.	TD	Fumbles
Fred Reid	213	1396	6.6	6	3
Steven Jyles	65	452	7.0	4	8
Buck Pierce	22	237	10.8	2	2
Chris Garrett	19	113	5.9	0	0
Alex Brink	23	73	3.2	1	1
Joey Elliott	9	66	7.3	0	0
Daryl Stephenson	7	30	4.3	0	0
Brock Ralph	2	24	12	0	0
Yvenson Bernard	5	22	4.4	1	0
Terrence Edwards	2	12	6.0	0	0
Adarius Bowman	2	9	4.5	0	0
Terence Jeffers-Harris	2	6	3.0	0	0
Chris Davis	1	4	4.0	0	0
Andre Sadeghian	1	0	0.0	0	0

=== Receiving ===
Player	No.	Yards	Avg.	Long	TD
Terrence Edwards	78	1372	17.6	90	12
Adarius Bowman	50	691	13.8	63	3
Greg Carr	31	568	18.3	74	4
Terence Jeffers-Harris	48	574	11.4	60	4
Brock Ralph	31	394	12.7	49	1
Cory Watson	17	277	16.3	55	1
Fred Reid	35	255	7.3	18	0
Chris Davis	16	184	11.5	40	1
Aaron Hargreaves	14	115	8.2	17	1
Brandon Stewart	1	27	27.0	27	0
Andre Sadeghian	2	12	6.0	9	0
Yvenson Bernard	1	7	7.0	7	0
Jamayel Smith	1	7	7.0	7	0
Jon Oosterhuis	1	0	0.0	0	0

=== Defence ===
Player	Tackles	Sacks	FF	Int
Clint Kent	77	2	2	1
Jovon Johnson	62	0	2	4
Joe Lobendahn	55	3	0	0
Phillip Hunt	53	16	1	0
Marcellus Bowman	51	3	0	1
Alex Suber	51	0	0	0
Doug Brown	49	5	1	0
Ian Logan	45	1	0	1
LaVar Glover	34	0	0	2
Dorian Smith	31	6	0	0
Brady Browne	28	0	0	2
Brandon Stewart	27	0	0	1
Deon Beasley	26	0	0	2
Jonathan Hefney	25	0	0	2
Odell Willis	25	11	4	0
Ike Charlton	22	0	2	0
Courtney Smith	14	0	0	1
Bernard Hicks	12	0	0	0
Merrill Johnson	10	0	0	0
Don Oramasionwu	9	3	1	0
Moton Hopkins	7	1	0	1

== Awards and records ==
=== 2010 CFL All-Stars ===
- RB – Fred Reid, CFL All-Star
- WR – Terrence Edwards, CFL All-Star
- DL – Doug Brown, CFL All-Star
- DE – Phillip Hunt, CFL All-Star

=== CFL Eastern All-Stars ===
- RB – Fred Reid, CFL Eastern All-Star
- WR – Terrence Edwards, CFL All-Star
- OG – Brendon LaBatte, CFL All-Star
- DT – Doug Brown, CFL All-Star
- DE – Phillip Hunt, CFL All-Star
- CB – Jovon Johnson, CFL All-Star
- P – Mike Renaud, CFL All-Star

== Playoffs ==
After finishing last in the East division, the Blue Bombers failed to qualify for the 2010 CFL playoffs.
