= 2012 Winnipeg Blue Bombers season =

Canadian football team season

- General manager: Joe Mack
- Head coach: Paul LaPolice (2–6); Tim Burke (4–6)
- Home stadium: Canad Inns Stadium

Results
- Record: 6–12
- Division place: 3rd, East
- Playoffs: did not qualify
- Team MOP: Chad Simpson
- Team MOC: Henoc Muamba
- Team MOR: Chris Matthews

Uniform

The 2012 Winnipeg Blue Bombers season was the 55th season for the team in the Canadian Football League (CFL) and their 80th overall. The Blue Bombers looked to continue on the success of the 2011 season, in which they made it all the way to the Grey Cup game. However, the team slipped to third place in the East Division and missed the playoffs, finishing with a 6–12 record. The team was supposed to play their first season in their new stadium, Investors Group Field, but ongoing construction delays have moved its opening to the beginning of the 2013 season. The Blue Bombers started the season with four straight road games, which was due to speculation that the stadium would be opened in time for a home opener in week 5 at the earliest. The Blue Bombers started the season 0–4 for the first time since 2008, which was also, coincidentally, a year after they had an appearance in the Grey Cup game.

After a 2–6 start, head coach Paul LaPolice was fired on August 25, 2012, after three years of employment. He was replaced by defensive coordinator Tim Burke.

The low point of the season occurred in Tim Burke's debut as head coach on September 2, 2012, in which the team suffered a 52–0 shutout loss to their biggest rivals the Saskatchewan Roughriders in the Labour Day Classic. It was the Bombers first shutout loss since they were blanked 33–0 by the Edmonton Eskimos on July 29, 1969. It was also their first shutout loss to Saskatchewan since October 15, 1949.

With a 28–18 loss to the Hamilton Tiger-Cats on October 27, 2012, the Blue Bombers were eliminated from playoff contention. Their final game of the season, a 19–11 victory over the Montreal Alouettes, would mark the final game played at Canad Inns Stadium prior to its demolition.

== Offseason ==
=== CFL draft ===
The 2012 CFL draft took place on May 3, 2012, live at 2:00 PM CDT. The Blue Bombers had five selections in the six-round draft, including the loss of their first-round pick after selecting Kito Poblah in the 2011 Supplemental draft. The traded back into the first round by trading two of their second round picks for the third overall selection.

Round	Pick	Player	Position	School/Club team
1	3	Tyson Pencer	OL	Washington State
3	16	Johnny Aprile	WR	Queen's
3	21	Christo Bilukidi	DE	Georgia State
4	23	Rene Stephan	LB	Harding
4	29	Jake Thomas	DL	Acadia

== Preseason ==
Week	Date	Opponent	Score	Result	Attendance	Record
A	Thurs, June 14	at Montreal Alouettes	22–10	Win	20,005	1–0
B	Wed, June 20	vs. Hamilton Tiger-Cats	26–25	Loss	28,300	1–1

== Regular season ==
=== Season standings ===
East Division
Team	GP	W	L	T	PF	PA	Pts	
Montreal Alouettes	18	11	7	0	478	489	22	Details
Toronto Argonauts	18	9	9	0	445	491	18	Details
Winnipeg Blue Bombers	18	6	12	0	376	531	12	Details
Hamilton Tiger-Cats	18	6	12	0	538	576	12	Details

=== Season schedule ===
Week	Date	Opponent	Score	Result	Attendance	Record
1	Fri, June 29	at BC Lions	33–16	Loss	29,351	0–1
2	Fri, July 6	at Montreal Alouettes	41–30	Loss	21,016	0–2
3	Fri, July 13	at Edmonton Eskimos	42–10	Loss	32,067	0–3
4	Wed, July 18	at Toronto Argonauts	25–22	Loss	22,485	0–4
5	Thurs, July 26	vs. Edmonton Eskimos	23–22	Win	29,533	1–4
6	Fri, Aug 3	vs. Montreal Alouettes	36–26	Loss	29,533	1–5
7	Bye					1–5
8	Thurs, Aug 16	vs. Hamilton Tiger-Cats	32–25	Win	27,039	2–5
9	Fri, Aug 24	vs. BC Lions	20–17	Loss	29,533	2–6
10	Sun, Sept 2	at Saskatchewan Roughriders	52–0	Loss	33,427	2–7
11	Sun, Sept 9	vs. Saskatchewan Roughriders	25–24	Loss	30,077	2–8
12	Fri, Sept 14	at Calgary Stampeders	44–3	Loss	28,247	2–9
13	Fri, Sept 21	vs. Hamilton Tiger-Cats	34–12	Win	26,577	3–9
14	Sat, Sept 29	vs. Toronto Argonauts	29–10	Loss	27,169	3–10
15	Mon, Oct 8	at Montreal Alouettes	27–22	Win	23,201	4–10
16	Sat, Oct 13	vs. Calgary Stampeders	32–21	Loss	25,462	4–11
17	Fri, Oct 19	at Toronto Argonauts	44–32	Win	23,419	5–11
18	Sat, Oct 27	at Hamilton Tiger-Cats	28–18	Loss	29,722	5–12
19	Sat, Nov 3	vs. Montreal Alouettes	19–11	Win	26,907	6–12

== Roster ==
2012 Winnipeg Blue Bombers final roster
Quarterbacks: 16 R. J. Archer; 7 Alex Brink; Running backs: 43 James Green; 44 Jordan Matechuk; 39 Michel-Pierre Pontbriand; 32 Nathan Riva; 29 Carl Volny; Receivers: 89 Clarence Denmark; 80 Cassidy Doneff; 88 Jade Etienne; 13 Chris Matthews; 84 Wallace Miles; 1 Kito Poblah	Offensive linemen: 60 Shannon Boatman T; 64 Chris Greaves G; 69 Glenn January T; 65 Steve Morley G; 68 Justin Sorensen C; 55 Paul Swiston T; Defensive linemen: 99 Andre Caroll DT; 45 Rodney Fritz DE; 91 J. T. Gilmore DT; 56 Fernand Kashama DE; 94 Ryan Lucas DT; 54 Kenny Mainor DE; 95 Jake Thomas DT; 48 Youri Yenga DE	Linebackers: 38 Marcellus Bowman; 47 Pierre-Luc Labbé; 10 Henoc Muamba; 27 Terrell Parker; Defensive backs: 20 Deon Beasley; 23 Jonathan Hefney; 2 Jovon Johnson; 31 Ian Logan; 34 Jeremy McGee; 8 Brandon Stewart; 21 Alex Suber; 33 Dan West	Special teams: 50 Chris Cvetkovic LS; 17 Justin Palardy K; 9 Mike Renaud P; Reserve roster: 18 Justin Goltz QB; 67 Chris Kowalczuk C/G; 83 Doug Pierce WR; 15 Demond Washington DB; Practice roster: 52 James Carmon T; 93 Anthony DeGrate DE; 61 Brendan Dunn G; 40 Marcus McGraw LB; 3 Jawann Westerman DB	Injured list: 12 Kurt Adams WR (9 Game); 86 Issac Anderson SB (9 Game); 25 Brady Browne DB (9 Game); 90 Brandon Collier DT (9 Game); 59 Andre Douglas OT (9 Game); 82 Terrence Edwards SB (9 Game); 14 Joey Elliott QB (9 Game); 30 Will Ford RB (9 Game); 19 Chris Garrett RB (9 Game); 96 Alex Hall DE (9 Game); 87 Rory Kohlert WR (1 Game); 58 Tyson Pencer G (9 Game); 4 Buck Pierce QB (9 Game); 0 Johnny Sears DB (9 Game); 5 Chad Simpson RB (9 Game); 42 Rene Stephan LB (9 Game); 66 Jordan Taormina T (9 Game); 92 Bryant Turner DT (1 Game); 98 Jason Vega DE (1 Game); 81 Cory Watson SB (9 Game); 24 Anthony Woodson RB (9 Game); Italics indicate International player Roster updated 2026-05-14; Depth Chart • Transactions

== Coaching staff ==
2012 Winnipeg Blue Bombers staff
Front office: Owner – Community owned (non-profit corporation owned by members); Chairperson of the Board of Governors - Bill Watchorn; President/CEO – Jim Bell; Vice president and general manager of football operations – Joe Mack; Director of football operations – Ross Hodgkinson; Director of player personnel – Ken Moll; Head coaches: Head coach – Paul LaPolice; Assistant head coach – Vacant; Offensive coaches: Offensive coordinator and quarterbacks – Jamie Barresi; Receivers – Chris Wiesehan; Offensive line – Pat DelMonaco	Defensive coaches: Defensive coordinator – Tim Burke; Defensive line – Vacant; Linebackers – Casey Creehan; Defensive assistant – Markus Howell; Special teams coaches: Special teams coordinator – Kyle Walters; Special teams assistant – Markus Howell; → Coaching staff
