= 2013 Winnipeg Blue Bombers season =

Canadian football team season

- General manager: Joe Mack 1–5; Kyle Walters (Interim GM) 2–10
- Head coach: Tim Burke
- Home stadium: Investors Group Field

Results
- Record: 3–15
- Division place: 4th, East
- Playoffs: did not qualify
- Team MOP: Henoc Muamba
- Team MOC: Henoc Muamba
- Team MOR: Ian Wild

Uniform

The 2013 Winnipeg Blue Bombers season was the 56th season for the team in the Canadian Football League (CFL) and their 81st overall. The Blue Bombers finished in fourth place in the East Division with a 3–15 record and missed the playoffs for the second straight year. This was the first season for the Blue Bombers at their new stadium, Investors Group Field. Originally, They were supposed to start playing there in 2012, but delays in construction pushed the opening date to 2013.

This was the last season for the Blue Bombers as a member of the East Division, as the Ottawa Redblacks are to take the field in 2014. The Blue Bombers will move back to the West Division after having played in the East Division since the suspension of the Ottawa Renegades in 2006.

== Offseason ==
=== CFL draft ===
The 2013 CFL draft took place on May 6, 2013. The Blue Bombers had six selections in the seven-round draft, after making a single trade, sending their fifth round pick to Saskatchewan.

| Round | Pick | Player | Position | School/Club team |
|---|---|---|---|---|
| 1 | 2 | Andy Mulumba | DE | Eastern Michigan |
| 2 | 11 | Kristopher Robertson | DB | Concordia |
| 3 | 20 | Carl Fitzgerald | WR | Saint Mary's |
| 4 | 29 | Michael DiCroce | WR | McMaster |
| 6 | 46 | Stephen Alli | WR | Florida |
| 7 | 54 | Billy Pavopoulos | PK | British Columbia |

== Preseason ==
| Week | Date | Opponent | Score | Result | Attendance | Record |
|---|---|---|---|---|---|---|
| A | Wed, June 12 | vs. Toronto Argonauts | 24–6 | Loss | 28,642 | 0–1 |
| B | Thurs, June 20 | at Hamilton Tiger-Cats | 52–0 | Loss | 12,732 | 0–2 |

== Regular season ==
=== Season standings ===
East Division
| Team | GP | W | L | T | PF | PA | Pts | |
|---|---|---|---|---|---|---|---|---|
| Toronto Argonauts | 18 | 11 | 7 | 0 | 507 | 458 | 22 | Details |
| Hamilton Tiger-Cats | 18 | 10 | 8 | 0 | 453 | 468 | 20 | Details |
| Montreal Alouettes | 18 | 8 | 10 | 0 | 459 | 471 | 16 | Details |
| Winnipeg Blue Bombers | 18 | 3 | 15 | 0 | 361 | 585 | 6 | Details |

=== Season schedule ===
| Week | Date | Opponent | Score | Result | Attendance | Record | TV |
|---|---|---|---|---|---|---|---|
| 1 | Thurs, June 27 | vs. Montreal Alouettes | 38–33 | Loss | 33,500 | 0–1 | TSN/RDS/NBCSN |
| 2 | Thurs, July 4 | at Montreal Alouettes | 19–11 | Win | 22,134 | 1–1 | TSN/RDS/ESPN2 |
| 3 | Sat, July 13 | at Hamilton Tiger-Cats | 25–20 | Loss | 13,085 | 1–2 | TSN/ESPN3 |
| 4 | Fri, July 19 | vs. Toronto Argonauts | 35–19 | Loss | 31,257 | 1–3 | TSN/ESPN3 |
| 5 | Fri, July 26 | vs. Calgary Stampeders | 37–24 | Loss | 31,567 | 1–4 | TSN/RDS2/ESPN3 |
| 6 | Mon, Aug 5 | at BC Lions | 27–20 | Loss | 26,856 | 1–5 | TSN/NBCSN |
| 7 | Bye | | | | | | |
| 8 | Fri, Aug 16 | vs. Hamilton Tiger-Cats | 37–18 | Loss | 32,409 | 1–6 | TSN/RDS2/ESPN3 |
| 9 | Sat, Aug 24 | at Hamilton Tiger-Cats | 37–14 | Loss | 13,138 | 1–7 | TSN/RDS2/ESPN3 |
| 10 | Sun, Sept 1 | at Saskatchewan Roughriders | 48–25 | Loss | 44,910 | 1–8 | TSN/ESPN3 |
| 11 | Sun, Sept 8 | vs. Saskatchewan Roughriders | 25–13 | Win | 33,500 | 2–8 | TSN/ESPN3 |
| 12 | Sat, Sept 14 | at Edmonton Eskimos | 25–7 | Loss | 29,499 | 2–9 | TSN/ESPN3 |
| 13 | Fri, Sept 20 | vs. Edmonton Eskimos | 35–27 (OT) | Loss | 28,859 | 2–10 | TSN/RDS2/ESPN2 |
| 14 | Fri, Sept 27 | vs. BC Lions | 53–17 | Loss | 29,457 | 2–11 | TSN/RDS2/ESPN3 |
| 15 | Sat, Oct 5 | at Calgary Stampeders | 38–11 | Loss | 26,293 | 2–12 | TSN/ESPN3 |
| 16 | Mon, Oct 14 | at Montreal Alouettes | 34–27 | Win | 22,853 | 3–12 | TSN/RDS/ESPN3 |
| 17 | Sat, Oct 19 | vs. Toronto Argonauts | 26–20 | Loss | 28,869 | 3–13 | TSN/ESPN3 |
| 18 | Thurs, Oct 24 | at Toronto Argonauts | 36–21 | Loss | 18,478 | 3–14 | TSN/NBCSN |
| 19 | Sat, Nov 2 | vs. Hamilton Tiger-Cats | 37–7 | Loss | 26,316 | 3–15 | TSN/RDS2/ESPN3 |

== Roster ==
2013 Winnipeg Blue Bombers final roster
| Quarterbacks: 16 Jason Boltus; 18 Justin Goltz; 15 Max Hall; Running backs: 32 Mario Fannin; 26 Carl Fitzgerald; 30 Will Ford; 39 Michel-Pierre Pontbriand; 29 Carl Volny; Receivers: 89 Clarence Denmark; 88 Jade Etienne; 19 Aaron Kelly; 87 Rory Kohlert; 84 Wallace Miles; 1 Kito Poblah; 81 Cory Watson | Offensive linemen: 64 Chris Greaves G; 69 Glenn January T; 65 Jarvis Jones T; 65 Steve Morley G; 58 Tyson Pencer G; 68 Justin Sorensen C; Defensive linemen: 44 Zach Anderson DT/DE; 91 J. T. Gilmore DT; 99 J. D. Griggs DE; 54 Kenny Mainor DE; 95 Jake Thomas DT; 92 Bryant Turner DT/DE | Linebackers: 40 Philippe Dubuisson-Lebon; 43 James Green; 47 Pierre-Luc Labbé; 10 Henoc Muamba; 36 Daniel Sheffield; 38 Ian Wild; Defensive backs: 23 Desia Dunn; 2 Jovon Johnson; 3 Cauchy Muamba; 0 Johnny Sears; 31 Teague Sherman; 8 Brandon Stewart; 21 Alex Suber; 7 Demond Washington | Special teams: 50 Chris Cvetkovic LS; 12 Sandro DeAngelis K; 9 Mike Renaud P; Reserve roster: 86 Akeem Foster SB; 67 Chris Kowalczuk C/G; 25 Bo Smith DB; Practice roster: 56 Shea Allard T; 6 Levi Brown QB; 80 Brett Carter SB; 51 Cordaro Howard G; 49 Jake Killeen DE; 24 Semaj Moody DB; 61 Terriss Paliwoda G; 52 Taylor Reed LB | Injured list: 60 Shannon Boatman T/G; 93 Mathieu Boulay DE; 59 Andre Douglas T; 82 Terrence Edwards SB; 69 Dan Knapp T/G; 94 Ryan Lucas DT; 54 Kenny Mainor DE; 27 Marty Markett DB; 13 Chris Matthews WR; 98 Mike McAdoo DE; 20 Jeremy McGee DB; 53 Patrick Neufeld T; 57 Marc Parenteau C; 22 Terrell Parker LB; 90 Greg Peach DE; 5 Chad Simpson RB; 17 Mike Sims-Walker WR; 42 Rene Stephan LB; 55 Paul Swiston G/T; 33 Dan West DB; 14 Aaron Woods SB; Italics indicate International player |

== Coaching staff ==
2013 Winnipeg Blue Bombers staff
| Front office: Owner – Community owned (non-profit corporation owned by members); Chairperson of the board of governors – Brock Bulbuck; President/CEO – Wade Miller; Vice president and general manager of football operations – Kyle Walters (Interim); Director of football operations – vacant; Director of player personnel – Ken Moll; Head coaches: Head coach – Tim Burke; Offensive coaches: Offensive coordinator – Marcel Bellefeuille; Receivers – Markus Howell; Running backs – Steve Hladio; Offensive line – Pat DelMonaco | Defensive coaches: Defensive coordinator and linebackers – Casey Creehan; Defensive line – Will Plemons; Defensive backs – Carl Franks; Special teams coaches: Special teams coordinator – Craig Dickenson; → Coaching staff |
