= 2009 Winnipeg Blue Bombers season =

Canadian football team season

- Head coach: Mike Kelly
- Home stadium: Canad Inns Stadium

Results
- Record: 7–11
- Division place: 3rd, East
- Playoffs: did not qualify

Uniform

The 2009 Winnipeg Blue Bombers season was the 52nd season for the team in the Canadian Football League (CFL) and their 77th overall. The Blue Bombers were in the playoff hunt until the last game of the season, at home, against the Hamilton Tiger-Cats, but lost the game and failed to qualify for the playoffs for the first time since 2005, finishing the season with a disappointing 7–11 record.

== Off-season ==
On February 18, Milt Stegall announced his retirement from the Blue Bombers.

New coach Mike Kelly made many roster moves to re-shape the team that lost the 95th Grey Cup in 2007 and slid to an 8 win and 10 loss record in the 2008 season.

=== CFL draft ===
The 2009 CFL draft took place on May 2, 2009. Due to trades, the Blue Bombers did not have a selection until the third round, when they chose lineman Mike Morris from UBC.

| Round | Pick | Player | Position | School/Club team |
|---|---|---|---|---|
| 3 | 19 | Mike Morris | OL | UBC |
| 4 | 27 | Adam Bestard | OL | Wilfrid Laurier |
| 5 | 35 | Peter Quinney | FB | Wilfrid Laurier |
| 6 | 45 | Thaine Carter | LB | Queen's |

=== Notable transactions ===
- On February 18, Riall Johnson was acquired by the Winnipeg Blue Bombers, from the Toronto Argonauts for import middle linebacker Zeke Moreno and a conditional draft pick.

=== Pre-season ===
| Date | Opponent | Score | Result |
|---|---|---|---|
| June 17 | Hamilton Tiger-Cats | 32–22 | Win |
| June 24 | @ Montreal Alouettes | 31–27 | Loss |

== Regular season ==
=== Division standings ===
East Division
| Team | GP | W | L | T | PF | PA | Pts | |
|---|---|---|---|---|---|---|---|---|
| Montreal Alouettes | 18 | 15 | 3 | 0 | 600 | 324 | 30 | Details |
| Hamilton Tiger-Cats | 18 | 9 | 9 | 0 | 449 | 428 | 18 | Details |
| Winnipeg Blue Bombers | 18 | 7 | 11 | 0 | 386 | 508 | 14 | Details |
| Toronto Argonauts | 18 | 3 | 15 | 0 | 328 | 502 | 6 | Details |

=== Season schedule ===
| Week | Date | Opponent | Score | Result | Attendance | Record |
|---|---|---|---|---|---|---|
| 1 | July 2 | at Edmonton Eskimos | 19–17 | Loss | 30,650 | 0–1 |
| 2 | July 10 | Calgary Stampeders | 42–30 | Win | 29,533 | 1–1 |
| 3 | July 18 | at Hamilton Tiger-Cats | 25–13 | Loss | 24,292 | 1–2 |
| 4 | July 24 | Toronto Argonauts | 19–5 | Loss | 28,466 | 1–3 |
| 5 | August 1 | at Toronto Argonauts | 13–12 | Win | 23,821 | 2–3 |
| 6 | August 8 | at Calgary Stampeders | 31–23 | Loss | 35,650 | 2–4 |
| 7 | August 15 | Montreal Alouettes | 39–12 | Loss | 25,053 | 2–5 |
| 8 | August 21 | at BC Lions | 37–10 | Win | 27,983 | 3–5 |
| 9 | Bye | | | | | |
| 10 | Sept 6 | at Saskatchewan Roughriders | 29–14 | Loss | 30,945 | 3–6 |
| 11 | Sept 13 | Saskatchewan Roughriders | 55–10 | Loss | 29,533 | 3–7 |
| 12 | Sept 20 | at Montreal Alouettes | 33–14 | Loss | 20,202 | 3–8 |
| 13 | Sept 26 | Toronto Argonauts | 29–24 | Win | 22,446 | 4–8 |
| 14 | Oct 2 | Edmonton Eskimos | 27–17 | Win | 21,965 | 5–8 |
| 15 | Oct 12 | at Hamilton Tiger-Cats | 38–28 | Win | 19,562 | 6–8 |
| 16 | Oct 18 | BC Lions | 24–21 | Loss | 24,048 | 6–9 |
| 17 | Oct 24 | Montreal Alouettes | 41–24 | Win | 21,378 | 7–9 |
| 18 | Nov 1 | at Montreal Alouettes | 48–13 | Loss | 20,202 | 7–10 |
| 19 | Nov 8 | Hamilton Tiger-Cats | 39–17 | Loss | 29,038 | 7–11 |

== Roster ==
2009 Winnipeg Blue Bombers final roster
| Quarterbacks: 16 Michael Bishop; 13 Casey Bramlet; 7 Ricky Santos; Running backs: 26 Yvenson Bernard; 77 Jon Oosterhuis; 32 Fred Reid; 34 Daryl Stephenson; Receivers: 12 Adarius Bowman; 82 Terrence Edwards; 15 Aaron Hargreaves; 80 Brock Ralph; 83 Titus Ryan | Offensive linemen: 55 Ryan Donnelly G/C; 61 Luke Fritz G/T; 69 Glenn January T; 60 Obby Khan C; 57 Brendon LaBatte G; 65 Steve Morley T; Defensive linemen: 97 Doug Brown DT; 53 Phillip Hunt DE; 99 Michael Landry DT; 92 Pat MacDonald DT; 93 Don Oramasionwu DT; 91 Justin Shaw DE; 40 Odell Willis DE | Linebackers: 0 Ike Charlton; 45 Derrick Doggett; 47 Pierre-Luc Labbé; 42 Neil McKinlay; 20 Siddeeq Shabazz; 51 Barrin Simpson; Defensive backs: 25 Brady Browne; 10 Keyuo Craver; 22 Shawn Gallant; 23 Jonathan Hefney; 2 Jovon Johnson; 8 Nick Kordic; 31 Ian Logan; 21 Brandon Stewart; 27 Lenny Walls | Special teams: 50 Chris Cvetkovic LS; 18 Alexis Serna K/P; 74 Troy Westwood P; Reserve roster: 84 Dudley Guice WR; 58 Joe Lobendahn LB; 90 Dorian Smith DT; Practice roster: 68 Ryan Ackerman G; 4 Adam DiMichele QB; 66 Qasim Khan C; 36 Rafael Little RB; 3 Dante Luciani WR; 56 Chase Ortiz DE; 67 Lorne Plante T; 24 Levonne Rowan DB | Injured list: 14 Otis Amey WR; 88 Jabari Arthur SB; 59 Kelly Bates G; 86 Arjei Franklin WR; 30 Steve Holness DB; 19 James Johnson DB; 17 Stefan LeFors QB; 9 Mike Renaud P; 41 Fred Perry DE; 98 Gavin Walls DE; Suspended: Aaron McConnell DT; Italics indicate International player |

== Statistics ==
=== Offence ===
==== Passing ====
| Player | Att | Comp | % | Yards | TD | INT | Rating |
|---|---|---|---|---|---|---|---|
| Michael Bishop | 404 | 204 | 50.5 | 3035 | 15 | 19 | 68.3 |
| Stefan LeFors | 88 | 41 | 46.6 | 459 | 2 | 2 | 60.8 |
| Bryan Randall | 20 | 6 | 30.0 | 58 | 0 | 4 | (−44.2) |
| Richie Williams | 10 | 3 | 30.0 | 30 | 0 | 1 | 39.6 |
| Casey Bramlet | 14 | 2 | 14.3 | 18 | 0 | 3 | (−70.0) |

==== Rushing ====
| Player | Att | Yards | Avg. | TD | Fumbles |
|---|---|---|---|---|---|
| Fred Reid | 238 | 1371 | 5.8 | 7 | 2 |
| Yvenson Bernard | 53 | 336 | 6.3 | 0 | 4 |
| Brock Ralph | 22 | 135 | 6.1 | 0 | 2 |
| Michael Bishop | 19 | 84 | 4.4 | 0 | 6 |
| Stefan LeFors | 15 | 68 | 4.5 | 0 | 2 |
| Lavarus Giles | 14 | 54 | 3.9 | 2 | 0 |
| Mike Renaud | 1 | 25 | 25 | 0 | 0 |
| Ricky Santos | 7 | 24 | 3.4 | 1 | 0 |
| Bryan Randall | 4 | 23 | 5.8 | 0 | 0 |
| Romby Bryant | 4 | 12 | 3.0 | 0 | 1 |
| Richie Williams | 2 | 9 | 4.5 | 0 | 0 |
| Gavin Walls | 1 | 9 | 9.0 | 0 | 0 |
| Jon Oosterhuis | 1 | 0 | 0.0 | 0 | 0 |

==== Receiving ====
| Player | No. | Yards | Avg. | Long | TD |
|---|---|---|---|---|---|
| Adarius Bowman | 55 | 925 | 16.8 | 55 | 6 |
| Terrence Edwards | 52 | 816 | 15.7 | 57 | 5 |
| Brock Ralph | 43 | 559 | 13.0 | 32 | 2 |
| Titus Ryan | 8 | 285 | 35.6 | 65 | 3 |
| Romby Bryant | 20 | 232 | 11.6 | 36 | 0 |
| Otis Amey | 18 | 188 | 10.4 | 47 | 0 |
| Fred Reid | 21 | 157 | 7.5 | 24 | 1 |
| Yvenson Bernard | 17 | 153 | 9.0 | 29 | 0 |
| Aaron Hargreaves | 14 | 142 | 10.1 | 17 | 0 |
| Dudley Guice, Jr. | 6 | 76 | 12.7 | 33 | 0 |
| Arjei Franklin | 5 | 53 | 10.6 | 18 | 0 |
| Jon Oosterhuis | 4 | 41 | 10.3 | 19 | 0 |
| Craphonso Thorpe | 2 | 27 | 13.5 | 14 | 0 |
| Steve Morley | 1 | 8 | 8.0 | 8 | 0 |
| Riall Johnson | 1 | 8 | 8.0 | 8 | 0 |
| Daryl Stephenson | 1 | 1 | 1.0 | 1 | 0 |

== Playoffs ==
The Blue Bombers finished third in the East Division with a record of 7 wins and 11 losses. The BC Lions, who finished fourth in the West, had a better record of 8 wins and 10 losses, and under the cross-over rule eliminated Winnipeg from the playoffs. The Lions went on to play the Hamilton Tiger-Cats in the East semi-final at Ivor Wynne Stadium, winning 34-27 in overtime before losing to the Montreal Alouettes in Montreal in the East Final.
