= Jovon Johnson =

American gridiron football player (born 1983)

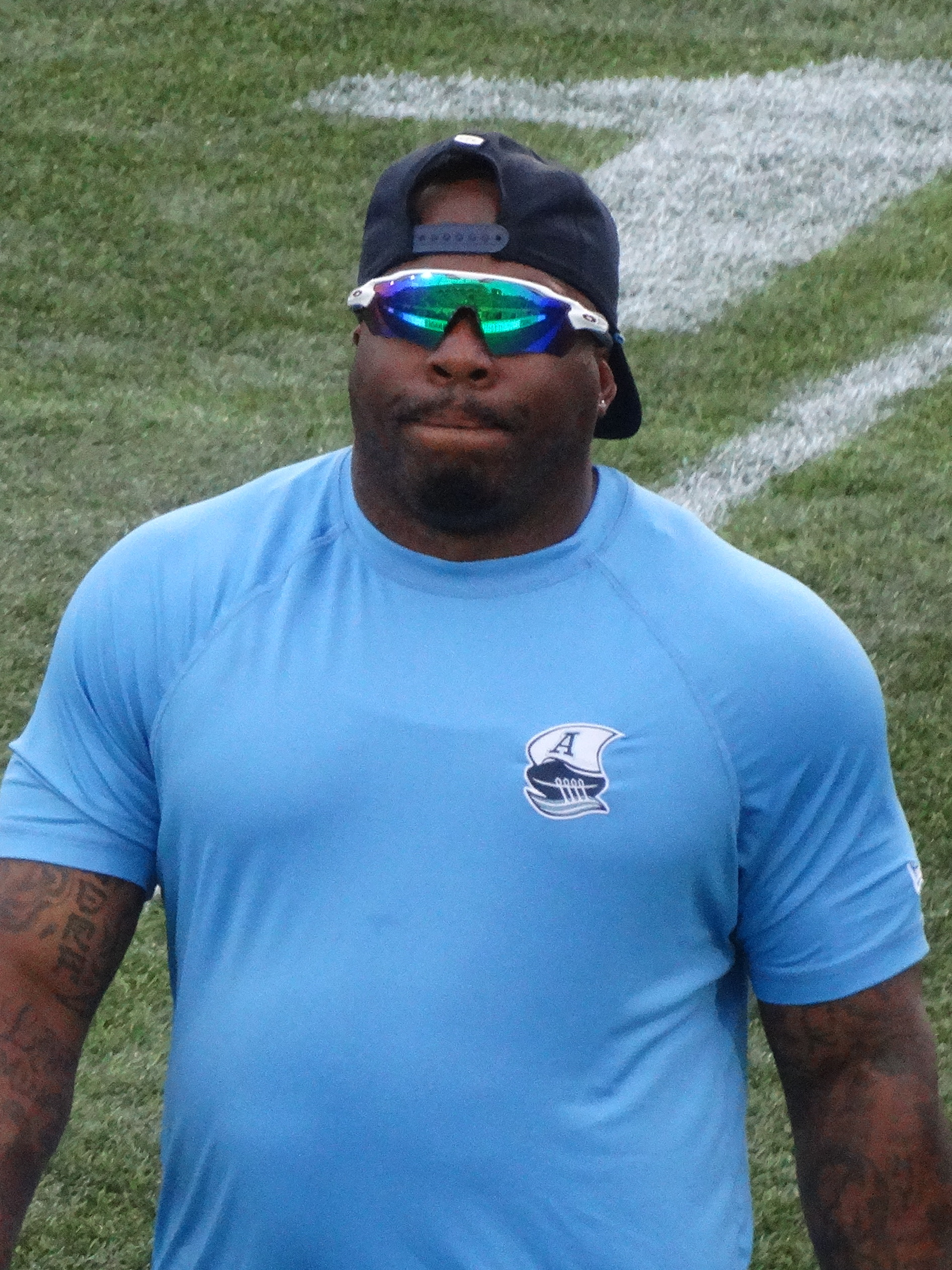
- Johnson with the Toronto Argonauts in 2026

Toronto Argonauts
- Title: Defensive backs coach

Personal information
- Born: November 2, 1983 (age 43); Erie, Pennsylvania, U.S.
- Listed height: 5 ft 8 in (1.73 m)
- Listed weight: 177 lb (80 kg)

Career information
- Position: Cornerback (No. 2)
- High school: Mercyhurst Prep (Erie)
- College: Iowa (2002–2005)
- NFL draft: 2006: undrafted

Career history

Playing
- New York Jets (2006)*; Pittsburgh Steelers (2006); Saskatchewan Roughriders (2007); Erie RiverRats (2008); Winnipeg Blue Bombers (2008–2013); Ottawa Redblacks (2014–2015); Montreal Alouettes (2016–2017); Saskatchewan Roughriders (2017–2018)
- * Offseason or practice squad member only

Coaching
- Defiance (2020–2021) Defensive coordinator & defensive backs coach; North East HS (PA) (2022–2023) Head coach; Gannon (2024–2025) Special teams coordinator & defensive backs coach; Toronto Argonauts (2026–present) Defensive backs coach

Awards and highlights
- Grey Cup champion (2007); 2× CFL All-Star (2009, 2011); CFL's Most Outstanding Defensive Player Award (2011); James P. McCaffrey Trophy (2011); First-team All-Big Ten (2005); Second-team All-Big Ten (2003)
- Stats at Pro Football Reference

Jovon Johnson (born November 2, 1983) is an American former professional football defensive back and is the defensive backs coach for the Toronto Argonauts of the Canadian Football League (CFL). He played in 12 seasons and 188 games in the CFL for the Saskatchewan Roughriders, Winnipeg Blue Bombers, Ottawa Redblacks, and Montreal Alouettes. He was the winner of the CFL's Most Outstanding Defensive Player Award in 2011 while with the Blue Bombers, becoming the first defensive back to win the award in the league. He is also a two-time CFL All-Star and five-time CFL East Division All-Star. He also won the 95th Grey Cup with the Roughriders in 2007. He was also a member of the New York Jets, Pittsburgh Steelers, and Erie RiverRats.

== High school and collegiate career ==
Johnson played his high school ball (and basketball) at Mercyhurst Prep in Erie, Pennsylvania, graduating in 2002. He attended the University of Iowa as a 4-year starter in the Hawkeyes' secondary.

== Professional career ==
Pre-draft measurables
Height	Weight	40-yard dash	20-yard shuttle	Three-cone drill	Vertical jump	Broad jump	Bench press
5 ft 7 7/8 in (1.72 m)	178 lb (81 kg)	4.61 s	4.43 s	7.00 s	36.0 in (0.91 m)	10 ft 1 in (3.07 m)	7 reps
All values from Pro Day

=== Pittsburgh Steelers ===
He was signed by the Pittsburgh Steelers after cornerback Chidi Iwuoma and linebacker Richard Seigler were placed on injured reserve. He spent all of his playing time on the Steelers' special teams recording 1 tackle and 1 assist. He was released from the Pittsburgh Steelers on October 27, 2007.

=== Saskatchewan Roughriders ===
The Saskatchewan Roughriders signed Johnson on October 5, 2007, to a contract and placed on their Developmental Squad. He made his CFL debut on October 21, 2007, against the Hamilton Tiger-Cats. In total, he dressed in eight games while playing in two. He was a member of the 95th Grey Cup championship team, although he did not play in the game itself.

=== Erie RiverRats ===
At the end of February in 2008, he was signed by his hometown Erie RiverRats of the AIFA. In early 2007 he had signed to play with the city's previous AIFA franchise, the now defunct Erie Freeze, but did not play for the Freeze and decided to play for the Steelers instead.

=== Winnipeg Blue Bombers ===
Johnson was signed by the Winnipeg Blue Bombers of the Canadian Football League in April 2008 and started 17 of 18 games during the 2008 CFL season. He led the Bombers in defensive tackles with 57 and added 3 INTs.

He then returned to RiverRats for the 2009 AIFA season following a contract signing in January 2009. He was still under contract in the CFL however the season starts later in the year which would allow him to play in the AIFA. After only one game, it was found out that there was a clause in Johnson's contract with the Winnipeg Blue Bombers that prevents him from playing with any other team. With that, he returned to Winnipeg.

The 2011 Winnipeg Blue Bombers season proved to be a successful one for Johnson, helping to lead the Bombers to their first division title in ten years. He was part of a noteworthy Bombers' defense that had self-titled itself 'Swaggerville' and was named the CFL East Division's most outstanding defensive player. Following this, Johnson was named a CFL East Division all-star for the third consecutive time, as well as being named to his second CFL All-Star team a short time later. Johnson followed this up with an appearance as the first defensive back to win the CFL's Most Outstanding Defensive Player Award. He won the award as the standout player on a team full of talented defensive backs who led the league in fewest passing yards allowed, holding opponents to the lowest pass completion percentage, and led the league with most team interceptions. Johnson accomplished this with teammates such as Jonathan Hefney, Alex Suber, and Brandon Stewart. Johnson continued to play at a high level for the 2012 and 2013 seasons. Through 6 seasons with the Blue Bombers, Johnson amassed 363 tackles, 8 special teams tackles, 23 interceptions, 8 fumble recoveries and 7 defensive touchdowns. Following the 2013 Johnson, age 30, was not re-signed by the Bombers, becoming a free agent on February 11, 2014.

=== Ottawa Redblacks ===
On February 12, 2014, Johnson signed with the Ottawa Redblacks of the Canadian Football League. He recorded the first two sacks of his career during a forgettable 2014 season that saw the expansion club finish 2-16. The next year, however, the Redblacks finished first in the CFL East Division and Johnson was named an Eastern All-Star for the fifth time in his career.

=== Montreal Alouettes ===
Johnson was signed by the Montreal Alouettes on February 10, 2016. Johnson played in all 18 games during his first season with the Alouettes. Johnson was released by the Alouettes on June 17, 2017 as teams trimmed their rosters down to 46 players for the start of the season.

=== Saskatchewan Roughriders (II) ===
On June 19, 2017, the Roughriders announced that Johnson had been added to the team's practice roster. Johnson dressed for all 18 games for the Riders and contributed with 39 defensive tackles, two interceptions and one forced fumble. Following the season Johnson and the Riders agreed to a contract extension.

Johnson signed a one-day contract with the Winnipeg Blue Bombers on March 2, 2020, to retire with the team.

=== Statistics ===
Regular season		Tackles			Interceptions				Fumbles
Year	Team	Tackles	STT	Sacks	Int	Yards	Long	TD	FF	FR	Yards	Long	TD
2007	SSK	9	0	0	0	0	0	0	0	0	0	0	0
2008	WPG	57	4	0	3	130	80	2	2	2	0	0	0
2009	WPG	75	2	0	6	163	73	1	0	0	0	0	0
2010	WPG	62	0	0	4	59	55	1	2	0	0	0	0
2011	WPG	55	0	0	8	104	67	2	0	0	0	0	0
2012	WPG	52	3	0	1	27	27	0	2	4	0	0	0
2013	WPG	62	0	0	1	17	17	0	0	2	48	48	1
2014	OTT	37	0	2	1	0	0	0	0	1	0	0	0
2015	OTT	54	0	0	5	53	26	0	0	4	0	0	0
2016	MTL	59	0	6	3	32	21	0	1	1	0	0	0
2017	SSK	39	0	0	2	42	42	1	1	2	47	47	0
CFL totals		543	9	8	34	585	80	7	9	14	95	48	2

== Coaching career ==
In 2020, Johnson was hired as the defensive coordinator and defensive backs coach for Defiance. In 2022, he was named head coach for North East High School in North East, Pennsylvania. He resigned after two seasons and posted an overall record of 10–11. In 2024, he was hired by Erik Raeburn of Gannon to be the team's special teams coordinator and defensive backs coach.

It was announced on January 8, 2026, that Johnson had joined the Toronto Argonauts to serve as the team's defensive backs coach.

== Head coaching record ==
Year	Team	Overall	Conference	Standing	Bowl/playoffs
North East Grape Pickers () (2022–2023)
2022	North East	2–8	0–5	7th	
2023	North East	8–3	5–1	1st	
North East:		10–11	5–6		
Total:		10–11			
National championship Conference title Conference division title or championship game berth
