= Adarius Bowman =

American gridiron football player (born 1985)

Profile
- Position: Slotback

Personal information
- Born: July 10, 1985 (age 41); Chattanooga, Tennessee, U.S.
- Listed height: 6 ft 3 in (1.91 m)
- Listed weight: 215 lb (98 kg)

Career information
- High school: Notre Dame
- College: Oklahoma State; North Carolina

Career history
- 2008: Saskatchewan Roughriders
- 2009–2010: Winnipeg Blue Bombers
- 2011–2017: Edmonton Eskimos
- 2018: Winnipeg Blue Bombers
- 2018: Montreal Alouettes
- 2022: Edmonton Elks*
- * Offseason or practice squad member only

Awards and highlights
- Grey Cup champion (2015); Tom Pate Memorial Award (2017); 3× CFL All-Star (2014-2016); 3× CFL West All-Star (2014-2016); Big 12 Offensive Newcomer of the Year (2006); First-team All-Big 12 (2006)
- Stats at CFL.ca

Adarius Bowman (born July 10, 1985) is an American former professional football wide receiver in the Canadian Football League (CFL). He was signed by the Saskatchewan Roughriders as an undrafted free agent in 2008. Bowman was also a member Winnipeg Blue Bombers, Montreal Alouettes, and Edmonton Eskimos/Elks. He played college football at Oklahoma State. Bowman was a Grey Cup Champion and three time CFL All-Star having accumulated 652 receptions for 9,491 yards and 49 touchdowns in 141 career games.

== Early life ==
Bowman was ranked by ESPN as the top wide receiver in Tennessee while playing at Notre Dame High School. Not only did he catch passes on offense, but also had 4 interceptions and 75 tackles as a junior on defense. Bowman had 293 receiving yards and 5 touchdowns (a losing effort) in a 2001 game against The McCallie School, the eventual TSSAA Division II-AAA Champions. He played in the 2003 U.S. Army All-American Bowl.

In high school, Bowman excelled in track and basketball. In track, he won state titles in the 4x100 relay and triple jump. He also was selected to play in the annual Tennessee vs. Georgia game in his senior year of basketball.

== College career ==
=== North Carolina ===
After graduating from high school, Bowman began his collegiate career at North Carolina. As a true freshman, Bowman played in all 12 games but only started 2. During the span of the 12 games, he netted 181 receiving yards and two touchdowns. Although he had played in every game the previous season, Bowman only saw action 6 times during the 2004 season. Despite playing in fewer games than in the previous season, he managed to amass 329 receiving yards and 3 touchdowns.

=== Oklahoma State ===
Between the 2004 and 2005 seasons, Bowman transferred to Oklahoma State, where he would become a college football standout under first-year head coach Mike Gundy. He was redshirted during his junior year, but was back on the field in 2006.

In his first game in an Oklahoma State uniform, a 52–10 win over Missouri State, Bowman reeled in a 19-yard touchdown plus two other passes totaling 28 yards. A few weeks later, in the game against Kansas that came to define his career, he pulled down 13 passes totaling a Big 12 record 300 yards. His four touchdowns, including a 64-yarder from Bobby Reid, made him a candidate for ESPN's College Football Player of the Week. By the end of the season, he had caught 60 passes—51 of which resulted in first down or touchdown yardage.

After the season ended, Bowman was named Big 12 Offensive Newcomer of the Year by both the Associated Press and the Big 12 coaches. At the team's football banquet, he was presented with the Bob Fenimore Award, which is presented annually to Oklahoma State's Most Valuable Player.

Going into his senior season, Bowman was ranked as one of the top receiver prospects in the 2008 NFL Draft. Mel Kiper Jr. ranked him as the 19th overall senior prospect before the season. He had a rather disappointing season in 2007, only catching 61 passes for 932 yards and 7 touchdowns.

== Professional career ==
=== 2008 NFL draft ===
Bowman was once regarded as a potential first-round pick in the 2008 NFL draft, but a string of events led to him going undrafted. First, an injury suffered against Kansas after a hit by future NFL player Aqib Talib caused him to miss the final two games of the regular season and scouts to question his durability. Next, poor performances at the Senior Bowl and practices preceding it caused his stock to drop further. At the 2008 NFL Combine, he ran a 4.74 40 yard dash, and had an even slower time at Oklahoma State's Pro Day. However, he was still projected as a late-round draft pick. After going undrafted, he also went unsigned as a rookie free agent, despite drawing interest by the Dallas Cowboys and Philadelphia Eagles.

=== Saskatchewan Roughriders ===
After failing to sign with an NFL team following the 2008 NFL Draft, Bowman signed a contract with the Saskatchewan Roughriders of the Canadian Football League (CFL) in May 2008. Bowman erupted for 112 yards and a touchdown on six catches in his debut for the Saskatchewan Roughriders. His 73-yard TD clinched Saskatchewan's win over the Edmonton Eskimos.

=== Winnipeg Blue Bombers ===
Bowman was traded to the Winnipeg Blue Bombers from the Saskatchewan Roughriders on April 1, 2009. He was traded along with non-import offensive lineman Jean-Francois Morin-Roberge, and non-import safety Brady Browne in exchange for import offensive lineman Dan Goodspeed. The Roughriders then traded Goodspeed to the Hamilton Tiger Cats for non-import offensive lineman Jordan Rempel. Bowman finished the year with 925 receiving yards and 6 touchdowns. Bowman struggled with dropped passes in the 2010 season, a recurring theme in his career to this point, which contributed to a difficult Blue Bombers' season. After failing to rectify this problem, he was demoted from the starting line-up and was eventually released on Oct. 20, 2010.

=== Edmonton Eskimos ===
On January 19, 2011, Bowman was signed by the Edmonton Eskimos. The 2011 CFL season was a breakout year for Bowman, recording 1,153 yards and 4 touchdowns. On November 5, Bowman had a career game, collecting 226 yards with 2 touchdowns. Bowman's second season with the Eskimos was cut short when in the second game of the season he suffered a torn ACL and MCL in his left knee. On July 9, 2012, the Eskimos announced that Bowman would miss the remainder of the 2012 CFL season. In his sixth season in the CFL, Bowman played in only the final 9 games after missing the first half of the season with an injury. Despite missing half the season Bowman still had a strong year accumulating 697 receiving yards and 5 touchdowns. On December 2, 2013, Bowman signed a two-year extension with Edmonton.

Bowman's 2014 CFL season was the best season of his career at that time, as Bowman led the league in receiving yards with 1,456, which was 376 yards ahead of second place. His 112 receptions were the most since Jamel Richardson's 112-catch season in 2011. Bowman followed up a strong 2014 season with another strong year in 2015. Adarius Bowman played in all but 2 of the regular season games in 2015; finishing the year with 93 receptions for 1,304 yards with 7 touchdowns. Bowman was named a CFL All-star for the 2015 campaign; his second year in a row. The Eskimos prevented Bowman from becoming a free-agent when they signed him to a new contract that will keep him playing in Edmonton through the 2017 CFL season. Bowman led the CFL in both receptions (120) and yards (1,761) in the 2016 season, setting career highs in receptions, yards and touchdowns (9). He was named a CFL All-Star for the third consecutive season. At the end of January 2017, he signed a contract extension keeping him with the Eskimos through the 2018 CFL season. The new contract made Bowman the highest paid receiver in the league. The deal included a $140,000 signing bonus with a base salary of $260,000 for 2017, and increasing by $5,000 in 2018. After playing in the first three games of the 2017 season Bowman was placed on the six-game injured list with a hamstring injury. Following the season, on February 5, 2018, Bowman was released by the Eskimos; the same day he was set to receive a $140,000 roster bonus.

=== Winnipeg Blue Bombers (II) ===
Only four days after being released by the Eskimos, Bowman signed a one-year contract with the Winnipeg Blue Bombers. He played in six games for the Blue Bombers, registering receptions in only three of those games with no touchdowns.

=== Montreal Alouettes ===
Following a slow start to the 2018 season, Bowman was traded to the Montreal Alouettes on July 23, 2018, to replace the recently traded Chris Williams. In 11 games with Montreal, Bowman recorded 30 catches for 372 yards, including catching the first CFL touchdown pass thrown by Johnny Manziel courtesy of a trick play. He was not re-signed following the season and became a free-agent in February 2019. Bowman announced his retirement from professional football on October 17, 2019.

=== Edmonton Elks ===
On January 26, 2022, the Edmonton Elks announced Bowman (age 36) would be coming out of retirement and returning for the 2022 CFL season. This ultimately proved to be short lived as Bowman announced his retirement on March 16, 2022.

== Career statistics ==
Receiving		Regular season						Playoffs
Year	Team	Games	No.	Yards	Avg	Long	TD	Games	No.	Yards	Avg	Long	TD
2008	SSK	9	23	358	15.6	73	3	1	3	35	11.7	13	0
2009	WPG	15	55	925	16.8	55	6	Team did not qualify
2010	WPG	12	50	691	13.8	63	3	Team did not qualify
2011	EDM	14	62	1,153	18.6	74	4	2	7	146	20.9	56	0
2012	EDM	2	9	145	16.1	38	0	Placed on injured reserve
2013	EDM	9	44	697	15.8	71	5	Team did not qualify
2014	EDM	17	112	1,456	13.0	49	6	2	13	156	12.0	17	1
2015	EDM	17	93	1,304	14.0	69	7	1	6	74	12.3	23	1
2016	EDM	17	120	1,761	14.7	63	9	2	6	114	19.0	57	2
2017	EDM	12	45	534	11.9	45	5	2	5	97	19.4	42	2
2018	WPG	6	9	95	10.6	25	0	Not with team
2018	MTL	11	30	372	12.4	47	1	Team did not qualify
CFL totals		141	652	9,491	14.6	74	49	10	40	622	15.0	57	6
