= Buck Pierce =

American gridiron football player and coach (born 1981)

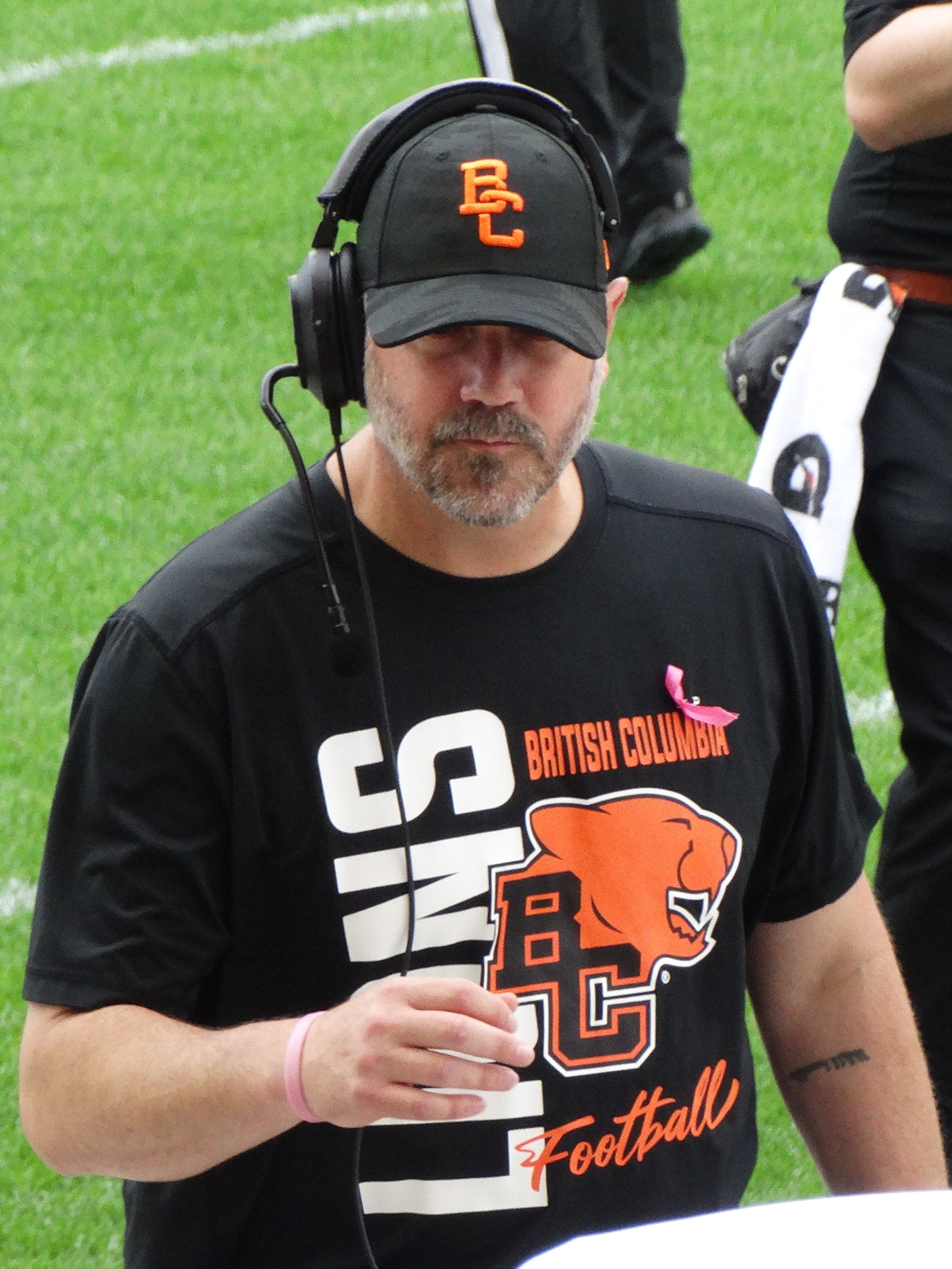
- Pierce with the BC Lions in 2025

BC Lions
- Title: Head coach

Personal information
- Born: November 15, 1981 (age 44); Hutchinson, Kansas, U.S.
- Listed height: 6 ft 1 in (1.85 m)
- Listed weight: 195 lb (88 kg)

Career information
- Position: Quarterback (No. 16)
- High school: Del Norte (Crescent City, California)
- College: New Mexico State

Career history

Playing
- 2005–2009: BC Lions
- 2010–2013: Winnipeg Blue Bombers
- 2013: BC Lions

Coaching
- 2014–2015: Winnipeg Blue Bombers (RB)
- 2016–2019: Winnipeg Blue Bombers (QB)
- 2020–2024: Winnipeg Blue Bombers (OC)
- 2025–present: BC Lions (HC/OC)

Awards and highlights
- 3× Grey Cup champion (2006, 2019, 2021); First-team All-Sun Belt (2004)
- Stats at CFL.ca (archive)

Buck James Pierce (born November 15, 1981) is an American professional football coach who is the head coach and offensive coordinator for the BC Lions of the Canadian Football League (CFL). He is a former quarterback who played nine seasons for the Lions and Winnipeg Blue Bombers. He spent the first five years of his career with the Lions before signing with the Blue Bombers for the 2010 CFL season. During the 2013 CFL season, he rejoined the Lions when the Blue Bombers traded him for Akeem Foster. He played in two Grey Cup games, winning a championship in 2006 and also won as part of the coaching staff with the Winnipeg Blue Bombers in 2019 and 2021. He played college football at New Mexico State from 2001–2004, starting at quarterback for most of his senior year.

== Early life ==
The son of Tim and Connie Pierce, he attended Del Norte High School, in Crescent City, California. He was a three-year starter at Del Norte, guiding the Warriors to a 16-4 record as a junior and senior.

He passed for 2,225 yards and 25 touchdowns as a senior in 1999, earning Big 5 Conference Most Valuable Player honors for the second consecutive season. He broke the school's single-season and career records for both passing yardage and passing touchdowns in 1999. Buck threw for 2,010 yards and 19 touchdowns as a junior in 1998 and 1,180 yards and 10 touchdowns as a sophomore in 1997.

He was voted to the Times Standard North Coast California All-Century team. He qualified for North State meet as a long jumper, leaping better than 22 feet as a junior. He also led DNHS to a pair of league titles as a starting guard on the basketball squad.

== College career ==
Pierce attended New Mexico State University, in Las Cruces, New Mexico where he majored in kinesiology. In 2001, on his first run from scrimmage as a college player, Pierce ripped off a 75-yard run against Louisville. He did not throw an interception in 2001 and did not throw one in 2002 until the fourth quarter against North Texas (11/16) in the next to last game of the season.

Wearing the #11 jersey, he started seven games as a sophomore, and took the top job in 2004 as a senior. He consistently posted high efficiency ratings as a college quarterback.

== Professional career ==
=== BC Lions ===
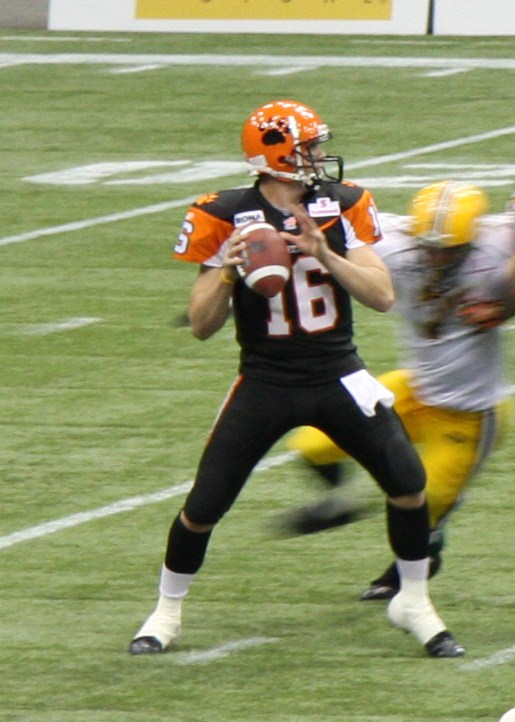
Pierce playing for the BC Lions in 2007

Pierce signed a free agent contract with the BC Lions of the Canadian Football League on May 16, 2005 after being passed over by the Saskatchewan Roughriders.

Pierce began the season as the third-string quarterback, making his CFL debut on August 19, 2005, versus Hamilton. In this game, he completed all three of his passes and also threw his first CFL touchdown pass, to running back Antonio Warren, in a 39-15 win over the Tiger-Cats. After injuries to starter Dave Dickenson and backup Casey Printers, Pierce earned his first career start in Week 16 at Winnipeg (Oct 10/5), a 44-23 loss, completing 12-of-22 passes for 133 yards.

After Casey Printers left for the NFL in 2006, Pierce was elevated to the backup quarterback position behind Dave Dickenson. Once Dickenson was injured in week 8 against the Edmonton Eskimos, Buck was again elevated to starter status, this time for two straight games and earned his first CFL win as a starter as the team won both games. Dickenson returned only to leave the September 24 game against the Saskatchewan Roughriders with post-concussion symptoms, leaving Pierce to start the next game against the Tiger-Cats, also a win. He started each of the next three games until playing poorly in the third game against Hamilton where Dickenson reclaimed his starter's position. Pierce went 5-1 as a starter as he led the CFL in completion percentage (73.7%) and had the second highest quarterback rating (109.0).. At the conclusion of the season, Pierce shared in the Lions championship, playing for a few snaps in the 94th Grey Cup.

In 2007, then-starter Dave Dickenson suffered yet another concussion, in week 3, and Pierce stepped up to assume the role of starting quarterback. By mid-August, Pierce was hobbled by injuries to his ribs, toe, hand, and shoulder, but he persevered in the starting role until finally relinquishing the role to third-stringer Jarious Jackson, who performed well himself. The Lions finished a team record 14-3-1, but succumbed to the Saskatchewan Roughriders in the West Final. Due to his frequent injuries, Pierce has been referred to as the Lions' "walking bruise". As of the end of 2007, he had started 11 games as a Lion, compiling a mark of 7-3-1.

With Dave Dickenson being released in the off-season, the starting quarterback's position was up for grabs for the 2008 season. Following the 2008 pre-season and a tough competition with back-up Jarious Jackson, Pierce was named the BC Lions starting quarterback. Because of an injury in the regular season opener, he acted as the back-up until Jackson's ineffective play led to Pierce returning as the starter against Montreal on Labour Day Weekend. After manhandling the Roughriders in the West Semi-Final, he led the Lions to the West Final against Calgary where they were defeated for the fourth time that season.

The 2009 season saw Pierce struggle with concussions and shoulder injuries. He was sidelined with the former in week 7 on August 14 in a game against Toronto. He returned to play for the first time in week 12 on September 19, starting again against Toronto, after Jarious Jackson was injured in the previous game against Montreal. But again, Pierce was besieged with injuries and left the week 16 match-up with Winnipeg, leaving third stringer Travis Lulay to carry out a victory.

With Jackson sitting out the rest of the season, head coach Wally Buono opted to sign former CFL MOP Casey Printers. In the Winnipeg game, Lulay had also injured himself towards the end of the game, forcing Buono to start Printers for the final three games of the regular season. When Printers was knocked out of the finale against Edmonton on November 6, Pierce came in, in relief, and was again knocked out with a shoulder injury. At season end Buono stated that not all five quarterbacks would be back in 2010.

On March 9, 2010, Buck Pierce was released by the BC Lions making him a free agent.

=== Winnipeg Blue Bombers ===
Pierce signed with the Winnipeg Blue Bombers of the Canadian Football League on April 12, 2010. He started Winnipeg's opening game of the 2010 CFL season against Hamilton on July 2, 2010. Pierce fought through an injury-plagued season, making only five starts with only three of those coming consecutively. Despite backup Steven Jyles playing well in his absence, the Blue Bombers showed their confidence in his progress in the off-season by trading Jyles to the Toronto Argonauts in May 2011, leaving Pierce the undisputed starter.

The 2011 Winnipeg Blue Bombers season began with significant optimism as the team hoped to make the playoffs after failing to qualify the last two seasons. One of the major questions regarding the team's potential was the health of their starting quarterback Buck Pierce, who had missed 13 games the previous year due to injury. Throughout the season Buck Pierce's health would prove to be a minor concern despite taking some vicious hits by defenders. The Blue Bombers jumped out to a 7-1 record to start the season, leading the Eastern Conference. After Labour Day Weekend the Bombers began to struggle losing 6 of 9 games entering the final game of the season with a record of 10-8. Statistically Pierce did not have a great season, but he proved that he was a sufficiently healthy quarterback who could win games.

The 2012 Winnipeg Blue Bombers season began with a great deal of optimism following the team's trip to the 99th Grey Cup in the previous season. Pierce sustained a leg injury in July which caused him to miss multiple games. In only his second game (September 29, 2012) back from injury Pierce took a violent hit to his head, from which he received a concussion. By the conclusion of the season Pierce had only played in 7 of the 18 regular season games. The Blue Bombers finished the year 6-12 and missed the playoffs.

Heading into the 2013 season the Bombers released Joey Elliott and Alex Brink leaving Pierce as the only QB on the roster with any CFL experience.

After Week 5, Pierce lost his starting job to Justin Goltz, and fell to No.3 in the depth chart behind Max Hall.

=== Return to BC ===
With the rise of young quarterbacks, Justin Goltz and Max Hall in Winnipeg, Joey Elliott being released in BC, and Pierce's inability to stay healthy, he was traded to BC on September 8, 2013, for non-import receiver Akeem Foster. He played in five games for the Lions and started their last regular season game of 2013. Following a nine-year career, Pierce announced his retirement on March 4, 2014.

== CFL statistics ==
=== Regular season ===
		Passing										Rushing
Year	Team	Games	Started	Att	Comp	Pct	Yards	Long	TD	Int	Rating	Att	Yards	Avg	Long	TD	Fumb
2005	BC	18	1	71	43	60.6	679	54	3	1	100.6	15	104	6.9	17	2	0
2006	BC	18	6	186	137	73.7	1,752	67	11	6	109.0	31	294	9.5	39	3	2
2007	BC	15	4	127	81	63.8	1,013	35	5	3	91.7	22	164	7.5	20	1	0
2008	BC	18	11	362	232	64.1	3,018	79	19	9	97.4	29	177	6.1	16	1	6
2009	BC	17	12	315	199	63.2	2,272	62	10	12	79.5	39	276	7.1	23	1	6
2010	WPG	5	5	120	80	66.7	1,080	90	6	4	97.9	22	237	10.8	43	2	2
2011	WPG	16	16	411	261	63.5	3,348	92	14	18	82.0	51	324	6.4	48	2	1
2012	WPG	7	7	113	68	60.2	951	57	3	3	85.1	12	60	5.0	12	0	4
2013	WPG	6	4	128	78	60.9	946	65	2	6	69.3	8	30	3.8	8	0	1
2013	BC	5	1	36	21	58.3	230	43	3	1	93.5	4	18	4.5	15	1	0
CFL totals		125	67	1,869	1,200	64.2	15,289	92	76	63	89.2	233	1,684	7.2	48	14	18

=== Postseason ===
Playoffs				Passing					Rushing		
Year	Game	GP	GS	Att	Cmp	Yards	TD	Int	Att	Yards	TD
2005	West Final	1	0	0	-	-	-	-	0	-	-
2006	West Final	1	0	0	-	-	-	-	0	-	-
2007	West Final	1	0	0	-	-	-	-	0	-	-
2008	West Semi-Final	1	1	31	23	221	1	0	1	7	0
2008	West Final	1	1	29	16	262	0	1	2	16	0
2009	*East Semi-Final	0	-	-	-	-	-	-	-	-	-
2009	*East Final	0	-	-	-	-	-	-	-	-	-
2011	East Final	1	1	28	16	175	1	0	9	66	0
2013	West Semi-Final	1	0	0	-	-	-	-	0	-	-
CFL totals		7	3	88	55	658	1	2	12	89	0

*Team qualified for Crossover

=== Grey Cup ===
Grey Cup				Passing					Rushing		
Year	Team	GP	GS	Att	Cmp	Yards	TD	Int	Att	Yards	TD
2006	BC	1	0	0	-	-	-	-	1	0	0
2011	WPG	1	1	37	19	250	2	1	4	17	0
CFL totals		2	1	37	19	250	2	1	5	17	0

== Coaching career ==
=== Winnipeg Blue Bombers ===
On March 7, 2014, only three days after announcing his retirement, Pierce was announced as the running backs coach for the Winnipeg Blue Bombers. He served in that capacity for two seasons before being named the team's quarterbacks coach on February 3, 2016. In 2019, Pierce coached Matt Nichols, Chris Streveler, and Zach Collaros as the latter was the team's starter in the team's victory over the Hamilton Tiger-Cats in the 107th Grey Cup.

On January 21, 2020, Pierce was named the offensive coordinator for the Blue Bombers as the incumbent, Paul LaPolice, left the team to become head coach of the Ottawa Redblacks. After the 2020 CFL season was cancelled, Pierce's offense helped the team to a first place finish as Collaros was named the CFL's Most Outstanding Player and the Blue Bombers repeated as Grey Cup champions in their 108th Grey Cup win. In his four seasons as the team's offensive coordinator, the Blue Bombers qualified for the championship game in each season and won once.

=== BC Lions ===
On December 3, 2024, Pierce was named the head coach of the BC Lions, the 28th in franchise history. On January 2, 2025, it was confirmed that he would also serve as the team's offensive coordinator.

=== CFL coaching record ===
Team	Year	Regular season					Postseason		
Team	Year	Won	Lost	Ties	Win %	Finish	Won	Lost	Result
BC	2025	11	7	0	.611	2nd in West Division	1	1	Lost West Final (SSK)
BC	2026	10	8	0	.556	2nd in West Division	1	1	Lost West Final (EDM)
Total		21	15	0	.583	0 Division Championships	2	2	

== Personal life ==
Pierce and his wife live in Winnipeg, where he once owned a barbeque restaurant which closed in 2015. They have a daughter born in 2015.
