= Alex Brink =

American gridiron football player (born 1985)

No. 10, 7, 15
- Position: Quarterback

Personal information
- Born: June 2, 1985 (age 41); Eugene, Oregon, U.S.
- Listed height: 6 ft 2 in (1.88 m)
- Listed weight: 208 lb (94 kg)

Career information
- High school: Sheldon (Eugene)
- College: Washington State (2004–2007)
- NFL draft: 2008: 7th round, 223rd overall pick

Career history
- Houston Texans (2008–2009)*; Winnipeg Blue Bombers (2010–2012); Toronto Argonauts (2013)*; Montreal Alouettes (2013–2014)
- * Offseason or practice squad member only

Awards and highlights
- 2× Second-team All-Pac-10 (2006, 2007)
- Stats at Pro Football Reference
- Stats at CFL.ca (archive)

Alex Brink (born June 2, 1985) is an American former professional football quarterback. After playing college football at Washington State, Brink was selected by the Houston Texans in the seventh round of the 2008 NFL draft.

In 2010, he joined the Winnipeg Blue Bombers of the Canadian Football League (CFL). Brink was also a member of the Toronto Argonauts and Montreal Alouettes.

== Early life ==
A native of Eugene, Oregon, Brink attended Sheldon High School, and becoming a letterman in football, basketball and baseball. In football, as a senior, he led his team to the state championship, with a 31–24 win over Lake Oswego. During that season he passed for 3946 yards and 36 touchdowns, while being named Oregon Player of the Year. He passed for over 3,500 yards in his junior season as well. His record as a high school starter was 35–3, with one state championship. In baseball, he was a standout player and threw a perfect game. He graduated from Sheldon High in 2003 with a 3.91 GPA.

== College career ==
Brink finished his career as one of Washington State's all-time greats, holding the school career records in passing yards, touchdowns, attempts, completions and total offense. His senior year, he threw for 3,818 yards, the second highest single-season total in school's history. He is the only Cougar to have five 400-plus yard games and has five of the top 10 and three of the top four passing games in WSU history. Although the program was coming off three consecutive 10 win seasons when Brink inherited the team, he failed to lead the Cougars to a single winning season in four years as a starter.

Brink finished his career as the third leading passer, in terms of yards, in Pac-10 history, behind Carson Palmer and Derek Anderson and fifth leader in touchdowns. He is also only the sixth signal caller in conference history to throw for more than 10,000 yards and toss 70-or-more touchdowns. In his college career, Brink completed 58.4 percent of his passes for 10,913 yards. He threw 76 touchdowns but also 43 interceptions. Brink led the Cougars to four straight seasons without a bowl berth. As a starter, Brink was 17–23 over four seasons.

During a game against Oregon State University in the 2005 season Brink set a new school record with 531 passing yards. Ahead 30–16 at the break, the Cougars, however, lost that game due in part to defensive and special teams lapses and other mistakes, but also because Brink threw one touchdown against four interceptions. For much of the 2006 season, Brink led the Pac-10 in passing yards. He was named second-team All-Pac-10 for his efforts. The Cougars were at one point in the 2006 season ranked No. 25 in the nation with a 6–3 record, but lost their final three games to finish the year at 6-6. In 2006-2007 Pac-10 rankings, he led the league in total offense with 242.2 yards per game, was second in passing at 241.6 ypg, and fourth in passing efficiency.

Brink finished his senior year as the 2007 Pac-10 leader in total offense and named second-team All-Pac-10. His final game as a Cougar resulted in a come-from-behind, 42–35 victory over rival University of Washington in the annual Apple Cup in which he threw for 399 yards and five touchdowns. He remains the only WSU quarterback ever to beat Washington three times.

== Professional career ==
Pre-draft measurables
| Height | Weight | Arm length | Hand span | 40-yard dash | 10-yard split | 20-yard split | 20-yard shuttle | Three-cone drill | Vertical jump | Broad jump |
|---|---|---|---|---|---|---|---|---|---|---|
| 6 ft 2 1/4 in (1.89 m) | 212 lb (96 kg) | 32 3/8 in (0.82 m) | 8 1/2 in (0.22 m) | 4.97 s | 1.66 s | 2.77 s | 4.19 s | 7.22 s | 28.0 in (0.71 m) | 9 ft 4 in (2.84 m) |
All values from NFL Combine

=== Houston Texans ===
Brink was selected by the Houston Texans in the seventh round (223rd overall) of the 2008 NFL draft. He signed a rookie contract with the team on June 27, 2008. He was later released on August 29 during final cuts.

The Texans re-signed Brink to the practice squad on October 8 after cornerback Derrick Roberson was released. He was re-signed to a future contract at the end of the year. The Texans waived Brink on June 24, only to re-sign him on August 17 after an injury to Rex Grossman. He was waived again on September 5.

=== Winnipeg Blue Bombers ===
Brink tried out for the New York Jets in late April but shortly after he agreed to a contract with the Winnipeg Blue Bombers of the CFL for the 2010 season.

In early August 2012, he was named the starting quarterback for Winnipeg, following an injury to Buck Pierce. After a string of poor performances as the starter, he was replaced by Joey Elliott.

Brink was released by the Blue Bombers on April 8, 2013. Brink spent three seasons with the Blue Bombers, starting 7 games over that time. He threw for 2,573 yards with 13 touchdowns and 13 interceptions.

=== Toronto Argonauts ===
On April 29, 2013, Brink signed with the Toronto Argonauts. He was released by the Argonauts on May 16, 2013.

=== Montreal Alouettes ===
On October 3, 2013, Brink signed with the Montreal Alouettes. He began the 2014 season as a back-up to Troy Smith, but after ineffective play by Smith, Brink took over as the team's starting quarterback in week 8. He started two games before he was replaced by Jonathan Crompton, who remained the starter until the conclusion of the season. On February 6, 2015, Brink was released after the team had signed John Skelton.

== CFL statistics ==
| | | Passing | | | | | | | | | | Rushing |
| Year | Team | Games | Started | Att | Comp | Pct | Yards | Long | TD | Int | Rating | Att | Yards | Avg | Long | TD |
|---|---|---|---|---|---|---|---|---|---|---|---|---|---|---|---|---|
| 2010 | WPG | 16 | 0 | 40 | 15 | 37.5 | 130 | 45 | 0 | 1 | 36.5 | 23 | 73 | 3.2 | 12 | 1 |
| 2011 | WPG | 18 | 3 | 140 | 89 | 63.6 | 1,023 | 52 | 5 | 4 | 85.5 | 43 | 148 | 3.4 | 21 | 6 |
| 2012 | WPG | 18 | 4 | 217 | 121 | 55.8 | 1,391 | 55 | 8 | 8 | 72.2 | 54 | 241 | 4.5 | 33 | 7 |
| 2014 | MTL | 18 | 2 | 61 | 33 | 54.1 | 261 | 20 | 0 | 2 | 51.3 | 5 | 45 | 9.0 | 17 | 0 |
| CFL totals | | 70 | 9 | 458 | 258 | 56.3 | 2,805 | 55 | 13 | 15 | 70.4 | 125 | 507 | 4.1 | 33 | 14 |

== See also ==
- List of Division I FBS passing yardage leaders
