= Wopamo Osaisai =

American gridiron football player (born 1986)

No. 33, 21
- Position: Cornerback

Personal information
- Born: September 13, 1986 (age 40); Oakland, California, U.S.
- Listed height: 5 ft 11 in (1.80 m)
- Listed weight: 199 lb (90 kg)

Career information
- High school: Pinole Valley (Pinole, California)
- College: Stanford (2004–2008)
- NFL draft: 2009: undrafted

Career history
- San Diego Chargers (2009)*; Edmonton Eskimos (2011); Montreal Alouettes (2012)
- * Offseason or practice squad member only

Awards and highlights
- First-team All-Pac-10 (2006); 2× Second-team All-Pac-10 (2007, 2008)
- Stats at Pro Football Reference
- Stats at CFL.ca (archive)

Wopamo Apere Osaisai (born September 13, 1986) is an American former professional football cornerback who played for the Edmonton Eskimos and Montreal Alouettes of the Canadian Football League (CFL). In his first game as an Eskimo, he caught an interception.
