= Terrence Edwards =

American football player (born 1979)

Profile
- Position: Wide receiver

Personal information
- Born: April 20, 1979 (age 47); Tennille, Georgia, U.S.
- Listed height: 6 ft 0 in (1.83 m)
- Listed weight: 171 lb (78 kg)

Career information
- College: Georgia

Career history
- 2003: Atlanta Falcons
- 2005: Toronto Argonauts*
- 2005–2006: Montreal Alouettes
- 2007–2013: Winnipeg Blue Bombers
- * Offseason or practice squad member only

Awards and highlights
- 2× CFL All-Star (2007, 2010); 3× CFL East All-Star (2007, 2010, 2011); First-team All-SEC (2002)
- Stats at Pro Football Reference
- Stats at CFL.ca (archive)

Terrence Edwards (born April 20, 1979) is an American former professional football player who was a wide receiver for nine seasons with the Winnipeg Blue Bombers and Montreal Alouettes of the Canadian Football League (CFL). He began his career in the National Football League (NFL) with the Atlanta Falcons, who signed him as an undrafted free agent in 2003. He played college football for the Georgia Bulldogs.

He is the younger brother of Robert Edwards, a former first-round pick of the New England Patriots and a former member of the Toronto Argonauts and Montreal Alouettes.

== College career ==
Like his older brother, Terrence Edwards attended the University of Georgia, where he played from 1999 to 2002. In his career, he caught 204 passes for 3,093 yards and 30 touchdowns. He left Georgia holding the SEC record for career receiving yards, a record that stood until Jordan Matthews broke it in 2013. As of 2023, his 204 receptions rank tenth all-time in the conference. As a senior in 2002, he caught 59 passes for 1,004 yards and 11 touchdowns.

== Professional career ==
=== Atlanta Falcons ===
After going undrafted in the 2003 NFL draft, Edwards signed with the Atlanta Falcons on April 29, 2003. Despite missing the team's final preseason game due to injury, Edwards made the team out of training camp. He was active for six games during the regular season, making his debut on September 28 against the Carolina Panthers. His first and only NFL reception to date came on November 30—a 10-yard grab against the Houston Texans from quarterback Doug Johnson.

A groin injury sidelined Edwards during most of the 2004 preseason, and he was released prior to the regular season. He has yet to reappear in the NFL, and his career stats include one reception for ten yards, one punt return for two yards, and one solo tackle.

=== CFL career ===
After spending the 2004 NFL season out of football, Edwards signed with the Toronto Argonauts of the Canadian Football League and went to training camp with the team. He was later released and picked up by the Montreal Alouettes later in the season, for whom he caught six passes for 44 yards in two games.

In 2006 with Montreal, Edwards caught 33 passes for 393 yards and a touchdown. He also carried the ball twice for 18 yards.

Edwards signed with the Winnipeg Blue Bombers on May 24, 2007. This would prove to be his breakout season in the CFL, as he was the league's fifth leading receiver in receptions (80), second in yards (1,280) and tied for second in touchdown receptions (9). He then won his third East Division All-Star award for his performances during the 2011 Winnipeg Blue Bombers season. Despite being 33 years old when the 2012 season begins, Edwards continued production and quality leadership lead the Bombers to extend his contract for an additional 2 years on April 16, 2012.

On February 18, 2014, Edwards announced his retirement from professional football.

=== Statistics ===
Receiving		Regular season						Postseason
Year	Team	Games	No.	Yards	Avg	Long	TD	Games	No.	Yards	Avg	Long	TD
2005	MTL	2	6	44	7.3	12	0	Did not dress
2006	MTL	9	33	393	11.9	36	1	2	5	27	5.4	11	0
2007	WPG	18	80	1,280	16.0	67	9	3	13	120	9.2	30	0
2008	WPG	15	76	1,010	13.3	64	7	Did not dress
2009	WPG	16	52	816	15.7	57	5	Team did not qualify
2010	WPG	18	78	1,372	17.6	90	12	Team did not qualify
2011	WPG	18	66	1,124	17.0	63	8	2	11	163	14.8	36	1
2012	WPG	16	70	1,049	15.0	50	4	Team did not qualify
2013	WPG	13	47	549	11.7	60	1	Team did not qualify
MTL totals		11	39	437	11.2	36	1	2	5	27	5.4	11	0
WPG totals		103	469	7,200	15.4	90	46	5	24	283	11.8	36	1
CFL totals		114	508	7,637	15.0	90	47	7	29	310	10.7	36	1
