= 2007 All-Pacific-10 Conference football team =

The 2007 All-Pacific-10 Conference football team consists of American football players chosen by various organizations for All-Pacific-10 Conference teams for the 2007 college football season. The USC Trojans won the conference, posting a 7–2 conference record. USC then beat the Illinois Fighting Illini in the Rose Bowl 49 to 17. Oregon quarterback Dennis Dixon was unanimously voted Pac-10 Offensive Player of the Year. USC defensive tackle Sedrick Ellis was voted Pat Tillman Pac-10 Defensive Player of the Year.

== Offensive selections ==
=== Quarterbacks ===
- Dennis Dixon, Oregon (Coaches-1)
- Alex Brink, Washington St. (Coaches-2)

=== Running backs ===
- Jonathan Stewart#, Oregon (Coaches-1)
- Justin Forsett, California (Coaches-1)
- Yvenson Bernard, Oregon St. (Coaches-2)
- Louis Rankin, Washington (Coaches-2)

=== Wide receivers ===
- Mike Thomas, Arizona (Coaches-1)
- Brandon Gibson, Washington St. (Coaches-1)
- DeSean Jackson, California (Coaches-2)
- Lavelle Hawkins, California (Coaches-2)

=== Tight ends ===
- Fred Davis, USC (Coaches-1)
- Jed Collins, Washington St. (Coaches-2)

=== Tackles ===
- Sam Baker, USC (Coaches-1)
- Andy Levitre, Oregon St. (Coaches-2)
- Eben Britton, Arizona (Coaches-2)
- Fenuki Tupou, Oregon (Coaches-2)

=== Guards ===
- Mike Pollak, Arizona St. (Coaches-1)
- Roy Schuening, Oregon St. (Coaches-1)
- Chilo Rachal, USC (Coaches-1)
- Juan Garcia, Washington (Coaches-2)
- Geoff Schwartz, Oregon (Coaches-2)

=== Centers ===
- Alex Mack#, California (Coaches-1)
- Max Unger, Oregon (Coaches-1)

== Defensive selections ==
=== Ends ===
- Lawrence Jackson, USC (Coaches-1)
- Dorian Smith, Oregon St. (Coaches-1)
- Nick Reed, Oregon (Coaches-1)
- Dexter Davis, Arizona St. (Coaches-2)
- Bruce Davis, UCLA (Coaches-2)
- Jeff Van Orsow, Oregon St (Coaches-2)

=== Tackles ===
- Sedrick Ellis#, USC (Coaches-1)
- Lionel Dotson, Arizona (Coaches-2)

=== Linebackers ===
- Keith Rivers, USC (Coaches-1)
- Rey Maualuga, USC (Coaches-1)
- Robert James, Arizona St. (Coaches-1)
- Joey LaRocque, Oregon St. (Coaches-2)
- Alan Darlin, Oregon St. (Coaches-2)
- Derrick Doggett, Oregon St. (Coaches-2)
- Zack Follett, California (Coaches-2)

=== Cornerbacks ===
- Antoine Cason, Arizona (Coaches-1)
- Brandon Hughes, Oregon St. (Coaches-2)
- Justin Tryon, Arizona St. (Coaches-2)
- Terrell Thomas, USC (Coaches-2)

=== Safeties ===
- Kevin Ellison, USC (Coaches-1)
- Patrick Chung, Oregon (Coaches-1)
- Chris Horton, UCLA (Coaches-1)
- Troy Nolan, Arizona St. (Coaches-2)

== Special teams ==
=== Placekickers ===
- Thomas Weber, Arizona St. (Coaches-1)
- Alexis Serna, Oregon St. (Coaches-2)

=== Punters ===
- Keenyn Crier, Arizona (Coaches-1)
- Jay Ottovegio, Stanford (Coaches-2)

=== Return specialists ===
- Matthew Slater, UCLA (Coaches-1)
- Kyle Williams, Arizona St. (Coaches-1)
- Jonathan Stewart, Oregon (Coaches-2)
- DeSean Jackson, California (Coaches-2)

=== Special teams player ===
- Jahvid Best, California (Coaches-1)
- Wopamo Osaisai, Stanford (Coaches-2)

== Key ==
Coaches = selected by Pac-12 coaches

# = unanimous selection by coaches

== See also ==
- 2007 College Football All-America Team
