= Chris Davis (wide receiver, born 1983) =

American football player (born 1983)

No. 19, 3
- Position: Wide receiver

Personal information
- Born: December 1, 1983 (age 42); Atlanta, Georgia, U.S.
- Listed height: 5 ft 10 in (1.78 m)
- Listed weight: 180 lb (82 kg)

Career information
- High school: Gibbs (St. Petersburg, Florida)
- College: Wake Forest
- NFL draft: 2006: undrafted

Career history
- Montreal Alouettes (2006–2007); New York Jets (2007); Tennessee Titans (2008)*; Hamilton Tiger-Cats (2008–2009); Calgary Stampeders (2009); Winnipeg Blue Bombers (2010); Kansas Koyotes (2014)
- * Offseason or practice squad member only

Career NFL statistics
- Receptions: 1
- Receiving yards: 3
- Stats at Pro Football Reference

Career CFL statistics
- Receptions: 43
- Receiving yards: 523
- Receiving touchdowns: 2

Chris T. Davis (born December 1, 1983) is an American former professional football player who was a wide receiver in the National Football League (NFL) and Canadian Football League (CFL). He was signed by the Montreal Alouettes as a street free agent in 2006. He played college football for the Wake Forest Demon Deacons. Davis was also a member of the New York Jets, Tennessee Titans, Hamilton Tiger-Cats, Calgary Stampeders, Winnipeg Blue Bombers, and Kansas Koyotes. He appeared in two games for the Jets in the 2007 season.
