= Andre Sadeghian =

Canadian football player (born 1984)

No. 20
- Position: Running back

Personal information
- Born: October 25, 1984 (age 42); Beamsville, Ontario, Canada
- Listed height: 5 ft 11 in (1.80 m)
- Listed weight: 219 lb (99 kg)

Career information
- University: British Columbia and McMaster
- CFL draft: 2007: 3rd round, 24th overall pick

Career history
- 2007: BC Lions
- 2008: Hamilton Tiger-Cats*
- 2008: Saskatchewan Roughriders*
- 2008–2010: Hamilton Tiger-Cats
- 2010: Winnipeg Blue Bombers
- * Offseason or practice squad member only
- Stats at CFL.ca

Andre Sadeghian (born October 25, 1984) is a Canadian former professional football running back.

Sadeghian was an athlete during his tenure at Blessed Trinity Secondary School in Grimsby, Ontario and won several track and field awards including: Ontario Indoor Track and Field Championship Silver Medal for 60m (2001, 2003), Gold Medal for 60m (2002), Bronze Medal for 60m Hurdles (2001, 2002, 2003), OFSAA Bronze Medal for 110m Hurdles (2002).

Andre attended the University of British Columbia for two years, then transferred to McMaster University. After sitting out one year for eligibility purposes, he had a solid final season with the McMaster Marauders. In his final season, he averaged almost 6 yards per carry (983 rushing yards) and had 10 touchdowns in eight games. Andre also had 12 receptions for 198 yards and 12 punt returns, also for 198 yards.

He was selected in the third round (24th overall) in the 2007 CFL draft by the British Columbia Lions. He spent the 2007 CFL season with the Lions and participated in all 18 regular season games. He was signed as a free agent by the Hamilton Tiger-Cats in 2008, placed on their Developmental Squad, released on August 2, signed by the Saskatchewan Roughriders on August 6 and placed on the Riders' Developmental Squad, only to be re-signed by the Tiger-Cats in October and dressed for three games.
