= Jamayel Smith =

American gridiron football player (born 1984)

No. 89, 9
- Position: Wide receiver

Personal information
- Born: August 9, 1984 (age 42); Atlanta, Georgia, U.S.
- Listed height: 6 ft 2 in (1.88 m)
- Listed weight: 187 lb (85 kg)

Career information
- College: Mississippi State
- NFL draft: 2009: undrafted

Career history
- New York Sentinels (2009); Winnipeg Blue Bombers (2010)

Jamayel Ramir Smith (born August 9, 1984) is an American former football wide receiver. He was signed by the New York Sentinels as an undrafted free agent in 2009. He played college football at Mississippi State.

== College career ==
Smith was a walk-on at Mississippi State and redshirted as a freshman. He placed third on the team in receptions (20) and had 335 yards. In his third year, he was an integral part of an 8–5 Bulldogs team, placing second in receptions and having three touchdowns on the year. His total college stats are as follows: 76 receptions, 1,147 yards and 6 touchdowns.

== Professional career ==
=== New York Sentinels ===
Smith was signed by the New York Sentinels of the United Football League on September 9, 2009.
