= Terence Jeffers-Harris =

American gridiron football player (born 1988)

No. 13
- Position: Wide receiver

Personal information
- Born: June 24, 1988 (age 38); San Diego, California, U.S.
- Listed height: 6 ft 2 in (1.88 m)
- Listed weight: 216 lb (98 kg)

Career information
- University: Vanderbilt

Career history
- 2010–2011: Winnipeg Blue Bombers
- 2011: Hamilton Tiger-Cats
- 2012: Saskatchewan Roughriders
- 2013: Calgary Stampeders
- 2015: BC Lions
- Stats at CFL.ca

Terence Jeffers-Harris (born June 24, 1988) is a former professional Canadian football wide receiver.

== College career ==
He played college football at the University of Connecticut, and Vanderbilt University.

== CFL career ==
He was signed by the Winnipeg Blue Bombers as a free agent on April 16, 2010. After he was released by the Bombers on November 17, 2011, he was quickly signed by the Tiger-Cats on November 18, 2011 to the team's practice roster. Jeffers-Harris was then signed by the Saskatchewan Roughriders on July 17, 2012. He signed with the Calgary Stampeders on February 5, 2013. He was released on June 16, 2013. On June 20, 2015, he was signed by the BC Lions, joining their practice roster.
