= Marcellus Bowman =

American gridiron football player (born 1986)

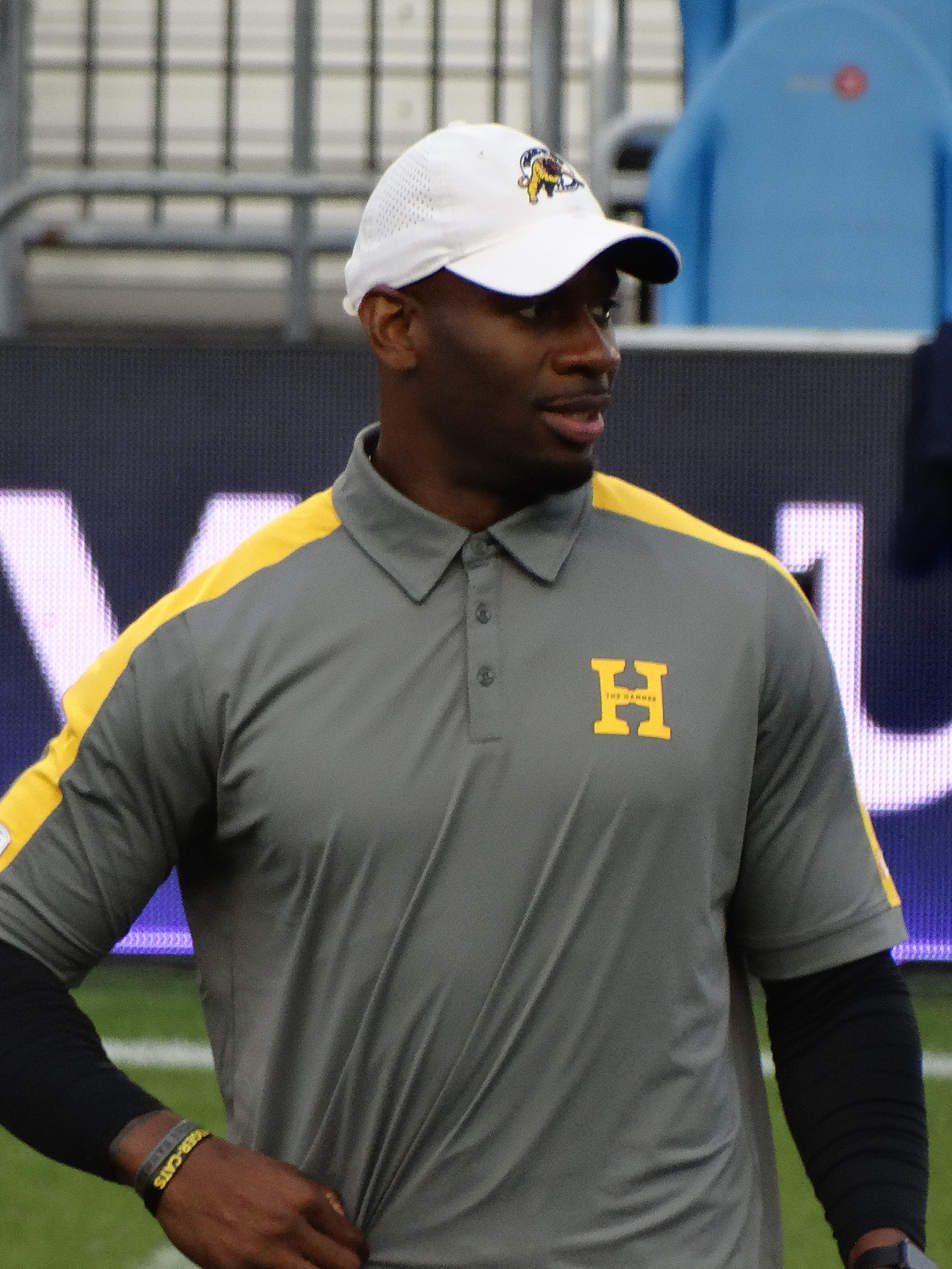
- Bowman with the Hamilton Tiger-Cats in 2024

Hamilton Tiger-Cats
- Title: Head strength and conditioning coach
- CFL status: American

Personal information
- Born: October 12, 1986 (age 40); Youngstown, Ohio
- Listed height: 6 ft 3 in (1.91 m)
- Listed weight: 228 lb (103 kg)

Career information
- High school: Youngstown (OH) Liberty
- College: Boston College

Career history

Playing
- 2010: Denver Broncos*
- 2010–2012: Winnipeg Blue Bombers
- 2013–2014: Hamilton Tiger Cats
- * Offseason or practice squad member only

Coaching
- 2017–18: Auburn Tigers (Strength and conditioning coach)
- 2019–20: UCF Knights (Assistant director of football performance)
- 2023–present: Hamilton Tiger-Cats (Head strength and conditioning coach)
- Stats at CFL.ca (archive)

Marcellus Bowman (born October 12, 1986), nicknamed the Boomakat, is an American former professional football linebacker and is the head strength and conditioning coach for the Hamilton Tiger-Cats of the Canadian Football League (CFL).

== College career ==
After using a redshirt season in 2005, Bowman played college football as a safety for the Boston College Eagles from 2006 to 2009.

== Professional career ==
Pre-draft measurables
Height	Weight	40-yard dash	10-yard split	20-yard split	20-yard shuttle	Three-cone drill	Vertical jump	Broad jump	Bench press
6 ft 2 in (1.88 m)	223 lb (101 kg)	4.57 s	1.47 s	2.66 s	4.21 s	6.89 s	37.5 in (0.95 m)	10 ft 1 in (3.07 m)	21 reps
All values from Pro Day

=== Denver Broncos ===
After being unselected in the 2010 NFL draft, Bowman signed with the Denver Broncos on April 26, 2010. However, he was released shortly after his signing on May 5, 2010.

=== Winnipeg Blue Bombers ===
Bowman joined the Winnipeg Blue Bombers for the 2010 season. He made the team's roster following training camp and made his professional debut on July 2, 2010, against the Hamilton Tiger-Cats. He played for three seasons with the team and in 43 games he recorded 153 defensive tackles, 29 special teams tackles, nine quarterback sacks, two interceptions, and two fumble recoveries.

=== Hamilton Tiger-Cats ===
Upon entering free agency, Bowman signed with the Hamilton Tiger-Cats on February 17, 2013. After spending the first 13 games of the 2013 season on the injured list, Bowman played in five regular season games, starting in one, where he had one defensive tackle and five special teams tackles. He also played in all three post-season games, including the 101st Grey Cup, where the Tiger-Cats lost to the Saskatchewan Roughriders. In 2014, he played in nine games where he recorded 23 defensive tackles and five special teams tackles.

== Coaching career ==
After spending time with the Auburn Tigers and UCF Knights in a strength and conditioning capacity, Bowman was hired by the Hamilton Tiger-Cats as the team's head strength and conditioning coach on January 4, 2023.

== Personal life ==
Bowman was born to parents Vanessa and Marcellus Bowman and has an older sister, Monique.
