= Clint Kent =

American gridiron football player and coach (born 1983)

Profile
- Position: Defensive back

Personal information
- Born: October 14, 1983 (age 43); Macon, Georgia, U.S.
- Listed height: 5 ft 9 in (1.75 m)
- Listed weight: 200 lb (91 kg)

Career information
- College: James Madison

Career history
- 2009: Montreal Alouettes
- 2010–2011: Winnipeg Blue Bombers
- 2012: Edmonton Eskimos
- Stats at CFL.ca (archive)

Clint Kent (born October 14, 1983) is an American gridiron football coach and former player. He is an assistant football coach at Lyon College in Batesville, Arkansas. Kent played professionally in the Canadian Football League (CFL) as a defensive back. He played college football at James Madison University. He also played professionally in Finland.
