= Jerry-Ralph Jules =

Canadian football player (born 1981)

Profile
- Position: Defensive back

Personal information
- Born: June 13, 1981 (age 45); Laval, Quebec, Canada
- Listed height: 5 ft 10 in (1.78 m)
- Listed weight: 181 lb (82 kg)

Career information
- University: Montréal
- CFL draft: 2009: undrafted

Career history
- 2010–2011: Winnipeg Blue Bombers
- Stats at CFL.ca (archive)

Jerry-Ralph Jules (born June 13, 1981) is a Canadian football defensive back. He most recently played for the Winnipeg Blue Bombers of the Canadian Football League. He was signed as undrafted free agent by the Winnipeg Blue Bombers on March 30, 2011. He played CIS Football with the Montreal Carabins.
