= Philippe Dubuisson-Lebon =

Canadian football linebacker

No. 46, 40
- Position: Linebacker

Personal information
- Born: June 19, 1988 (age 38); Montreal, Quebec, Canada
- Listed height: 6 ft 2 in (1.88 m)
- Listed weight: 221 lb (100 kg)

Career information
- CEGEP: Collège Montmorency
- University: Sherbrooke

Career history
- 2012–2013: Hamilton Tiger-Cats
- 2013: Winnipeg Blue Bombers
- 2014: Ottawa Redblacks*
- * Offseason or practice squad member only
- Stats at CFL.ca

Philippe Dubuisson-Lebon (born June 19, 1988) is a Canadian former professional football linebacker who played in the Canadian Football League (CFL) with the Hamilton Tiger-Cats and Winnipeg Blue Bombers. He played CIS football at the Université de Sherbrooke.

== Early life ==
Philippe Dubuisson-Lebon was born on June 19, 1988, in Montreal. He played CEGEP football at Collège Montmorency, and recorded seven interceptions in 2006. He played CIS football for the Sherbrooke Vert et Or, posting 30.5 tackles and 2.5 sacks from 2010 to 2011.

== Professional career ==
Dubuisson-Lebon was signed by the Hamilton Tiger-Cats on October 23, 2012, but was released on October 31, 2012. He was signed by the Tiger-Cats on April 4, 2013. Dubuisson-Lebon was released by the Tiger-Cats on July 2, 2013. He appeared in one game for the Tiger-Cats.

Dubuisson-Lebon signed with the Winnipeg Blue Bombers on July 16, 2013. He appeared in six games for the Blue Bombers.

Dubuisson-Lebon was signed by the Ottawa Redblacks on August 26, 2014. He was released by the Redblacks on May 14, 2015.
