= Rene Stephan =

Canadian football player (born 1988)

No. 42
- Position: Linebacker

Personal information
- Born: May 7, 1988 (age 38); St. Catharines, Ontario
- Listed height: 6 ft 2 in (1.88 m)
- Listed weight: 218 lb (99 kg)

Career information
- College: Harding
- CFL draft: 2012: 4th round, 23rd overall pick

Career history
- 2012–2014: Winnipeg Blue Bombers
- Stats at CFL.ca (archive)

Rene Stephan (born May 7, 1988) is a professional Canadian football linebacker. He was drafted 23rd overall in the fourth round of the 2012 CFL draft by the Blue Bombers and signed with the team on May 11, 2012. He played college football for the Harding Bison. He was released by the Winnipeg Blue Bombers on November 2, 2014.
