= Joe Lobendahn =

American gridiron football player (born 1983)

Profile
- Position: Linebacker

Personal information
- Born: February 15, 1983 (age 43); Honolulu, Hawaii, U.S.
- Listed height: 5 ft 11 in (1.80 m)
- Listed weight: 235 lb (107 kg)

Career information
- High school: Saint Louis School (Honolulu)
- College: Washington
- NFL draft: 2007: undrafted

Career history
- Spokane Shock (2007); Detroit Lions (2007)*; Winnipeg Blue Bombers (2008–2011); Calgary Stampeders (2012); Saskatchewan Roughriders (2012)
- * Offseason or practice squad member only

Awards and highlights
- Second-team All-Pac-10 (2005)
- Stats at CFL.ca (archive)

Joseph Lobendahn (born February 15, 1983) is an American former professional football linebacker of Samoan descent. He most recently played for the Saskatchewan Roughriders. He was signed by the club after being released by the Calgary Stampeders of the Canadian Football League (CFL). Lobendahn joined the Calgary Stampeders during 2012 training camp but failed to win a spot with the linebacker unit.

Lobendahn spent the previous four seasons with the Winnipeg Blue Bombers. He had a strong 2011 campaign until a serious knee injury put him on the Injured Reserve List in September.

He was originally signed by the Detroit Lions as an undrafted free agent in 2007. He played college football at Washington.
