= Aaron Hargreaves =

Canadian football player (born 1986)

No. 87
- Position: Wide receiver

Personal information
- Born: January 26, 1986 (age 40); Ladner, British Columbia, Canada
- Listed height: 6 ft 5 in (1.96 m)
- Listed weight: 234 lb (106 kg)

Career information
- University: Simon Fraser
- CFL draft: 2008: 2nd round, 15th overall pick

Career history
- 2008–2011: Winnipeg Blue Bombers
- 2012: Edmonton Eskimos
- 2012–2013: Saskatchewan Roughriders
- 2014: Ottawa Redblacks*
- * Offseason or practice squad member only
- Stats at CFL.ca

Aaron Hargreaves (born January 26, 1986) is a Canadian former professional football wide receiver. He was drafted by the Winnipeg Blue Bombers in the second round with the 15th pick in the 2008 CFL draft. He played CIS Football for the Simon Fraser Clan. He also played for the Edmonton Eskimos and Saskatchewan Roughriders.
