= Dorian Smith =

American gridiron football player (born 1985)

No. 93
- Position: Defensive lineman

Personal information
- Born: August 19, 1985 (age 41); Van Nuys, California, U.S.
- Listed height: 6 ft 1 in (1.85 m)
- Listed weight: 280 lb (127 kg)

Career information
- College: Oregon State
- NFL draft: 2008: undrafted

Career history
- 2009–2011: Winnipeg Blue Bombers
- 2012: Calgary Stampeders

Awards and highlights
- First-team All-Pac-10 (2007)
- Stats at CFL.ca

Dorian Smith (born August 19, 1985) is an American former professional football player who was a defensive lineman in the Canadian Football League (CFL).

Undrafted after playing two years of college football for the Oregon State Beavers, Smith spent three weeks on the Winnipeg Blue Bombers' practice roster in 2008. On February 27, 2009, he signed with the Blue Bombers and played 36 games for them, recording eight sacks in his rookie season in 2009 and helping their sack-leading 2010 season.

From free agency, Smith signed with the Stampeders on August 4, 2012.
