= Kenny Mainor =

American gridiron football player (born 1985)

Profile
- Position: Defensive lineman

Personal information
- Born: October 30, 1985 (age 41); Atlanta, Georgia, U.S.
- Listed height: 6 ft 4 in (1.93 m)
- Listed weight: 240 lb (109 kg)

Career information
- High school: Brunswick (Brunswick, Georgia)
- College: Troy
- NFL draft: 2009: undrafted

Career history
- Calgary Stampeders (2010)*; Winnipeg Blue Bombers (2011–2013); Alabama Hammers (2015)*
- * Offseason or practice squad member only

Awards and highlights
- Second-team All-Sun Belt (2007)

Career CFL statistics
- Tackles: 67
- Sacks: 21
- Stats at CFL.ca (archived)

Kenny Mainor (born October 30, 1985) is an American former professional football defensive lineman. He has also been a player for the Winnipeg Blue Bombers of the Canadian Football League (CFL). He played college football at Troy University. He was signed by the New York Giants as an undrafted free agent in 2009.
