= Tyson Pencer =

Canadian football player (born 1989)

Profile
- Position: Offensive lineman

Personal information
- Born: February 10, 1989 (age 37); Delta, British Columbia, Canada
- Listed height: 6 ft 7 in (2.01 m)
- Listed weight: 300 lb (136 kg)

Career information
- CJFL: Okanagan Sun
- College: Washington State
- CFL draft: 2012: 1st round, 3rd overall pick

Career history
- 2012–2014: Winnipeg Blue Bombers
- 2015: Edmonton Eskimos*
- * Offseason or practice squad member only
- Stats at CFL.ca

Tyson Pencer (born February 10, 1989) is a Canadian former professional football offensive lineman. He was ranked as the ninth best player in the Canadian Football League’s Amateur Scouting Bureau September rankings for players eligible in the 2012 CFL draft. After redshirting for the 2008 season, Pencer played his freshman and sophomore seasons for the Washington State Cougars in 2009 and 2010. He left the program for personal reasons and played for the Okanagan Sun of the Canadian Junior Football League in 2011.

== Professional career ==
=== Winnipeg Blue Bombers ===
Pencer was selected 3rd overall in the 2012 CFL draft by the Winnipeg Blue Bombers of Canadian Football League. He signed with the team on May 30, 2012. He was released on June 12, 2014

=== Edmonton Eskimos ===
Pencer signed with the Edmonton Eskimos on May 14, 2015.
