= Shannon Boatman =

American football player (born 1984)

No. 63, 60
- Position: Offensive tackle

Personal information
- Born: November 24, 1984 (age 41); Beaumont, Texas, U.S.
- Listed height: 6 ft 6 in (1.98 m)
- Listed weight: 325 lb (147 kg)

Career information
- High school: West Brook (Beaumont, Texas)
- College: Tyler JC (2004–2005); Florida State (2006–2007)

Career history
- 2008: Washington Redskins*
- 2009–2010: Toronto Argonauts
- 2011: Omaha Nighthawks
- 2012–2013: Winnipeg Blue Bombers
- * Offseason or practice squad member only

Shannon D'Ville Boatman (born November 24, 1984) is an American former professional football offensive tackle. He was signed by the Washington Redskins as an undrafted free agent in 2008. He played college football at Florida State.

== Professional career ==
=== Washington Redskins ===
After going undrafted in the 2008 NFL draft, Boatman signed with the Washington Redskins on May 1, 2008. He was released two days later on May 3, 2008.

=== Toronto Argonauts ===
Boatman spent the 2009 season on the Toronto Argonauts practice roster. He played 5 games in 2010. He was cut by the Argos during 2011 training camp.

=== Omaha Nighthawks ===
Boatman was signed by the Omaha Nighthawks of the United Football League on July 5, 2011.

=== Winnipeg Blue Bombers ===
Boatman signed with the Blue Bombers on July 4, 2012.
