= Wallace Miles =

American gridiron football player (born 1989)

No. 84, 3, 14
- Position: Wide receiver

Personal information
- Born: August 1, 1989 (age 37); Atlanta, Georgia, U.S.
- Listed height: 6 ft 1 in (1.85 m)
- Listed weight: 195 lb (88 kg)

Career information
- High school: Westlake (Atlanta)
- College: North Carolina A&T
- NFL draft: 2012: undrafted

Career history
- 2012: Detroit Lions*
- 2012–2013: Winnipeg Blue Bombers
- 2014: Ottawa Redblacks
- 2015: Edmonton Eskimos
- 2016: Toronto Argonauts
- * Offseason or practice squad member only

Awards and highlights
- Grey Cup champion (2015)
- Stats at CFL.ca (archive)

Wallace Miles (born August 1, 1989) is an American former professional football wide receiver who played in the Canadian Football League (CFL) for the Winnipeg Blue Bombers, Ottawa Redblacks, Edmonton Eskimos and Toronto Argonauts. He played college football at North Carolina Agricultural and Technical State University.

== Early life ==
Wallace Miles was born on August 1, 1989, in Atlanta, Georgia. He attended Westlake High School in Atlanta. He was a four-time team MVP and four-year team captain in soccer. He only played two years of varsity football in high school as a placekicker. Miles did not play wide receiver until a teammate suffered an injury during the final game of Miles' senior year.

== College career ==
Miles played college football for the North Carolina A&T Aggies of North Carolina Agricultural and Technical State University. He walked-on to the team as a placekicker but was quickly converted to wide receiver. He was redshirted in 2007. He played in 11 games, starting seven, in 2008, catching 26 passes for 188 yards and one touchdown. Miles appeared in ten games, starting nine, in 2009. He also spent time as the team's placekicker during the 2009 season, converting two of five field goal attempts. He played in 11 games, starting nine, in 2010, recording 34 receptions for 508 yards. Miles caught 70 passes for 1,048 yards and six touchdowns his senior year in 2011.

== Professional career ==
Miles was rated the 222nd best wide receiver in the 2012 NFL draft by NFLDraftScout.com.

Miles signed with the Detroit Lions on May 14, 2012, after going undrafted in the 2012 NFL draft. He was released by the Lions on August 31, 2012.

Miles was signed by the Winnipeg Blue Bombers on October 4, 2012. He dressed in, and started, one game for the Blue Bombers during the 2012 season, catching five passes for 35 yards on nine targets. He dressed in three games, all starts, in 2013, totaling 11 receptions for 158 yards and one touchdown on 24 targets.

On December 16, 2013, Miles was selected in the first round by the Ottawa Redblacks in the 2013 CFL Expansion Draft. He dressed in 15 games, starting 14, for the Redblacks during the team's inaugural 2014 season, catching 50 passes for 732 yards and four touchdowns on 87 targets.

Miles signed with the Edmonton Eskimos on February 12, 2015. He dressed in four games in 2015, totaling 16 catches for 131 yards on 23 targets. On November 29, 2015, the Eskimos beat the Redblacks in the 103rd Grey Cup by a score of 26–20. Miles was released by the team on November 30, 2015.

Miles signed with the Toronto Argonauts on June 3, 2016. He dressed in six games, starting four, for the Argonauts during the 2016 season, catching 13 passes for 127 yards on 18 targets. He was released on September 19, 2016.

== Personal life ==
In 2021, Miles released an autobiography titled "UNDERR8TED: The Route That Caught An NFL Dream". He has worked in construction after his football career.
