= Phillip Hunt =

American football player (born 1986)

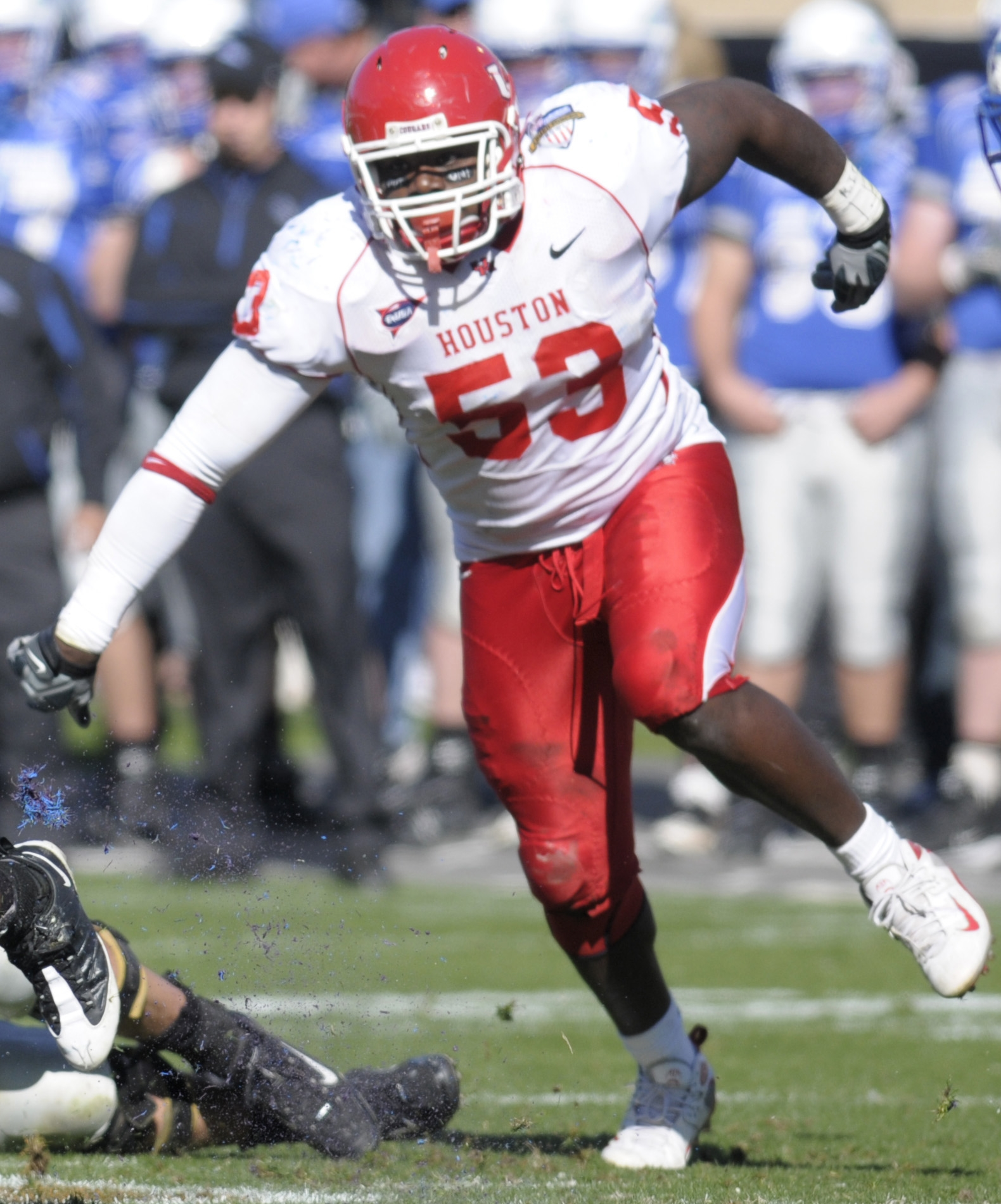
- Hunt in December 2008

No. 76, 58
- Position: Defensive end

Personal information
- Born: January 10, 1986 (age 40); Fort Worth, Texas, U.S.
- Listed height: 6 ft 2 in (1.88 m)
- Listed weight: 248 lb (112 kg)

Career information
- High school: Dunbar (Fort Worth)
- College: Houston
- NFL draft: 2009: undrafted

Career history
- Cleveland Browns (2009)*; Winnipeg Blue Bombers (2009–2010); Philadelphia Eagles (2011–2013); Indianapolis Colts (2014)*; Detroit Lions (2015); New Orleans Saints (2015); Edmonton Eskimos (2016–2017)
- * Offseason or practice squad member only

Awards and highlights
- CFL All-Star (2010); Conference USA Defensive Player of the Year (2008); 2x First-team All-Conference USA (2007, 2008); Third-team All-Conference USA (2006); Conference USA All-Freshmen Team (2005)

Career NFL statistics
- Total tackles: 24
- Sacks: 4
- Stats at Pro Football Reference
- Stats at CFL.ca

Phillip Wayne Hunt Jr. (born January 10, 1986) is an American former professional football player who was a defensive end in the National Football League (NFL) and Canadian Football League (CFL). He was signed by the Cleveland Browns as an undrafted free agent in 2009 after playing college football for the Houston Cougars. He played for the Winnipeg Blue Bombers from 2009 to 2010, and the Philadelphia Eagles from 2011 to 2013. He finished his career with the Edmonton Eskimos.

== Professional career ==
=== Cleveland Browns ===
In 2009 Hunt was signed as an undrafted free agent by the Browns, but was released before regular season.

=== Winnipeg Blue Bombers ===
After his release from the Browns prior to the 2009 season, Hunt signed with the Winnipeg Blue Bombers of the Canadian Football League (CFL) and spent two years with the Blue Bombers. In his first season, he recorded 11 tackles and three sacks, while he led the league in sacks with 16 the following year.

=== Philadelphia Eagles ===
Multiple NFL teams gave Hunt interest and invited him to workouts, including the Eagles, which after the 2010 season signed Hunt to a three-year contract on February 11, 2011. Hunt tore his ACL during the Eagles' first preseason game on August 9, 2013. He was placed on injured reserve on August 28, 2013, and became a free agent following the season.

=== Indianapolis Colts ===
On August 6, 2014, he was signed by the Indianapolis Colts, but failed to make the roster out of training camp and spent the 2014 season as a free agent.

=== Detroit Lions ===
On February 27, 2015, the Detroit Lions signed Hunt to a one-year contract. Hunt made the Lions roster out of training camp as a defensive end. He was cut on October 8, 2015.

=== New Orleans Saints ===
On November 23, 2015, the New Orleans Saints signed Hunt to a one-year $758,000 deal. On May 9, 2016, the Saints released Hunt.

=== Edmonton Eskimos ===
On September 6, 2016, signed with the Edmonton Eskimos of the Canadian Football League. On January 22, 2018, the Eskimos released Hunt.

== Personal life ==
Phillip and his wife Krystal have 3 children.
