= Pat DelMonaco =

American gridiron football coach (born 1979)

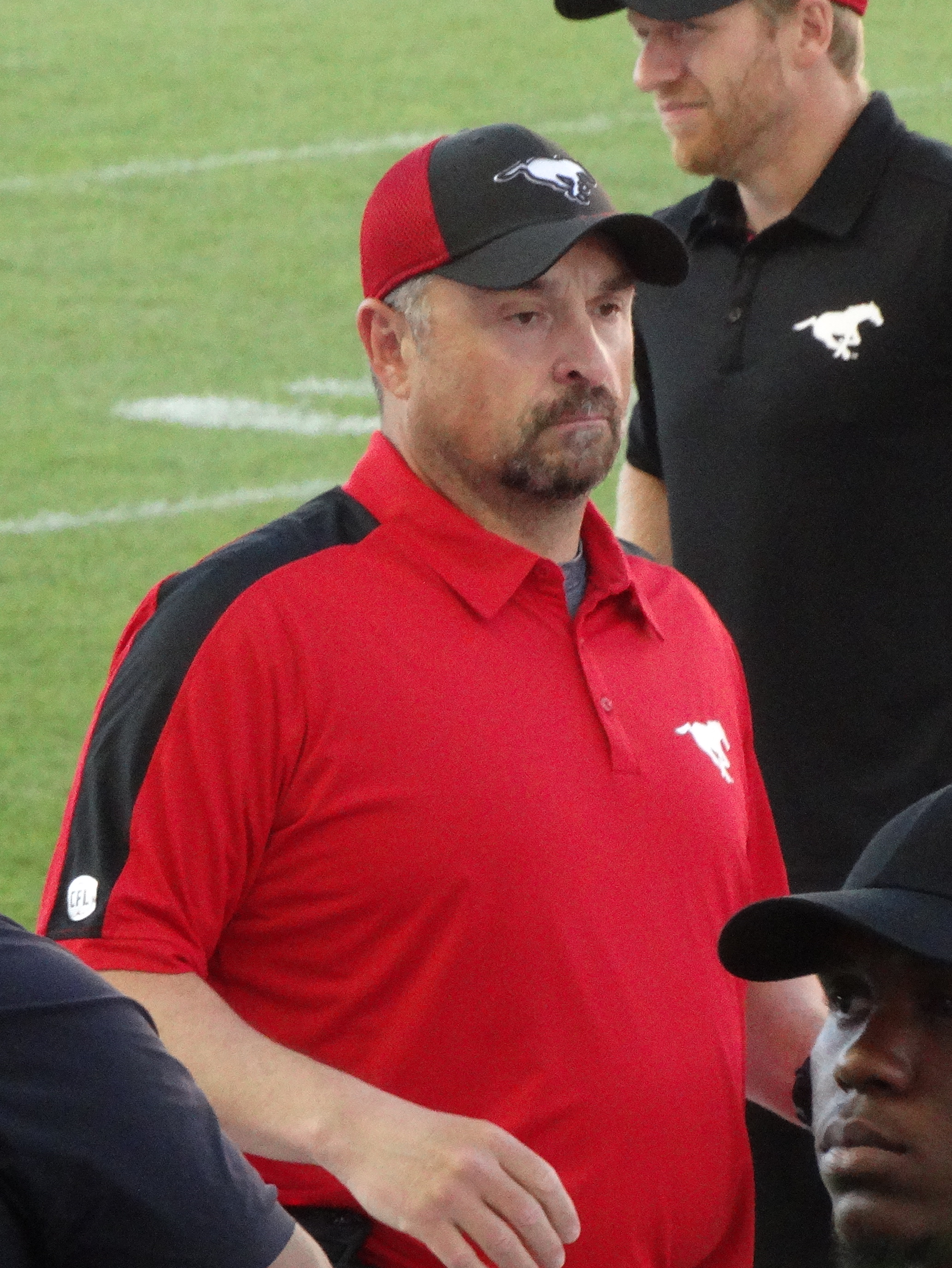
- DelMonaco with the Calgary Stampeders in 2024

Calgary Stampeders
- Title: Offensive coordinator & offensive line coach

Career information
- College: Albany (1996–1999)
- NFL draft: 2000: undrafted

Career history
- Hudson Valley (2000–2001) Offensive line coach; Hudson Valley (2000–2002) Offensive line coach (2002) Quarterbacks coach; Illinois (2001) Graduate assistant; RPI (2003–2004) Offensive line coach; RPI (2005–2009) Offensive coordinator & offensive line coach; Winnipeg Blue Bombers (2010–2013) Offensive line coach; Calgary Stampeders (2014–2019) Offensive line coach; Calgary Stampeders (2020–present) Offensive coordinator & offensive line coach

Awards and highlights
- 2× Grey Cup champion (2014, 2018)

Pasquale DelMonaco Jr. is an American gridiron football coach who is currently the offensive coordinator and offensive line coach for the Calgary Stampeders of the Canadian Football League (CFL). He played college football from 1996 to 1999 at Albany and later served as a coach at Hudson Valley CC (2000–2002), Illinois (2001), RPI (2003–2009) and for the Winnipeg Blue Bombers (2010–2013) before being hired by Calgary in 2014.

== Early life and education ==
A native of Sleepy Hollow, New York, DelMonaco attended the University at Albany, SUNY, playing center for their football team from 1996 to 1999 and being a captain as a senior. During his time with the team, they compiled a record of 35–7 and twice won the conference championship (in 1997 and 1998).

== Coaching career ==
After graduating from Albany, DelMonaco began a coaching career, being named the offensive line coach at Hudson Valley Community College in 2000. He served in the position through 2001, additionally being a graduate assistant for the Illinois Fighting Illini that year. He was Hudson Valley's quarterbacks coach in 2002. The following year, DelMonaco was named offensive line coach for the RPI Engineers in the NCAA's Division III.

After two years of coaching the offensive line at RPI, DelMonaco was given the role of offensive coordinator as well. He served in those positions until 2010, when he was hired to coach the offensive line for the Winnipeg Blue Bombers of the Canadian Football League (CFL) by Paul LaPolice, who had served himself as the offensive coordinator at RPI several years before DelMonaco.

DelMonaco served for four seasons as the Blue Bombers' line coach, from 2010 to 2013, helping them reach the 99th Grey Cup where they lost to the BC Lions. He helped his linemen earn a total of five divisional all-star honors in his stint with them. DelMonaco joined the Calgary Stampeders as offensive line coach in 2014, replacing Mike Gibson who became the offensive coordinator for the Ottawa Redblacks.

In his first season with Calgary, DelMonaco won the 102nd Grey Cup over the Hamilton Tiger-Cats, with his line not allowing a single sack in the game. He helped the team have best rushing average per game in the league in 2015 despite working with a line decimated by injuries, leading the Calgary Herald to name him the best position coach of the year.

In 2016, the Calgary line allowed the fewest sacks in the league for the third consecutive season under DelMonaco, with two members of the line being named league all-stars and Derek Dennis being named the league's most outstanding lineman. In 2018, Calgary tied for least sacks allowed and won the 106th Grey Cup. Following the 2019 season, in which two lineman earned division all-star honors and the Stampeders allowed the second-fewest sacks in the league, DelMonaco was promoted to offensive coordinator while retaining his position as offensive line coach. By this time, players under him had earned six league all-star awards and nine division all-star honors.

Calgary had three offensive players earn division all-star honors and allowed only 20 sacks in DelMonaco's first season with coordinator duties, 2021 (the 2020 season was cancelled due to the COVID-19 pandemic). In 2022, the Stampeders had five players earn division all-star honors on offense, led the league in both points scored (562) and rushing yards per game (135.3), and only allowed 17 sacks, 12 fewer than the next-best team.
