= Chris Kowalczuk =

Canadian football player (born 1985)

No. 67
- Position: Guard

Personal information
- Born: January 17, 1985 (age 41); Brampton, Ontario, Canada
- Listed height: 6 ft 6 in (1.98 m)
- Listed weight: 298 lb (135 kg)

Career information
- University: Toronto
- CFL draft: 2009: undrafted

Career history
- 2009: Hamilton Tiger-Cats*
- 2010–2013: Winnipeg Blue Bombers
- * Offseason or practice squad member only
- Stats at CFL.ca

Chris Kowalczuk (born January 17, 1985) is a Canadian football guard who last played for the Winnipeg Blue Bombers of the Canadian Football League. He was signed as an undrafted free agent by the Winnipeg Blue Bombers on April 22, 2010. He played CIS Football with the Toronto Varsity Blues.
