= Johnny Sears Jr. =

American gridiron football player (born 1987)

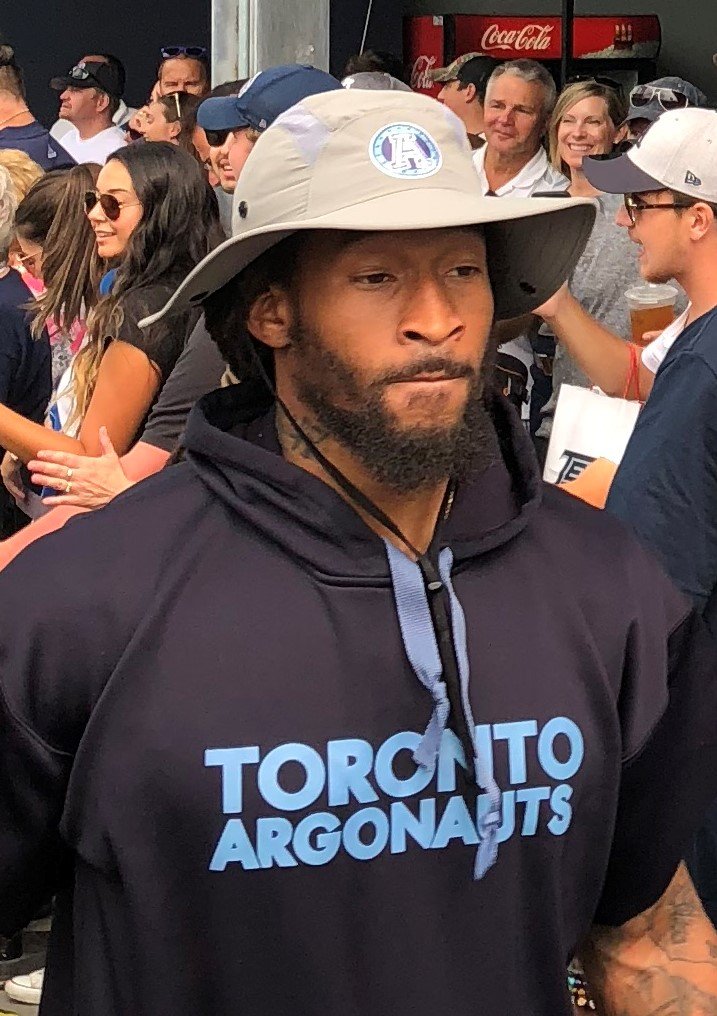
- Sears Jr. before a Toronto Argonauts game in 2018

No. 0
- Position: Defensive back

Personal information
- Born: March 16, 1987 (age 39); Fresno, California, U.S.
- Listed height: 6 ft 1 in (1.85 m)
- Listed weight: 193 lb (88 kg)

Career information
- College: Eastern Michigan

Career history
- 2010–2014: Winnipeg Blue Bombers
- 2015–2016: Hamilton Tiger-Cats
- 2017–2018: Toronto Argonauts

Awards and highlights
- Grey Cup champion (2017)
- Stats at CFL.ca

Johnny Sears Jr. (born March 16, 1987) is an American former professional football defensive back who played in the Canadian Football League (CFL) for the Winnipeg Blue Bombers, Hamilton Tiger-Cats and Toronto Argonauts. He played college football at the University of Michigan, followed by Eastern Michigan. He wore jersey number 0.
