= Alex Suber =

American gridiron football player coach (born 1986)

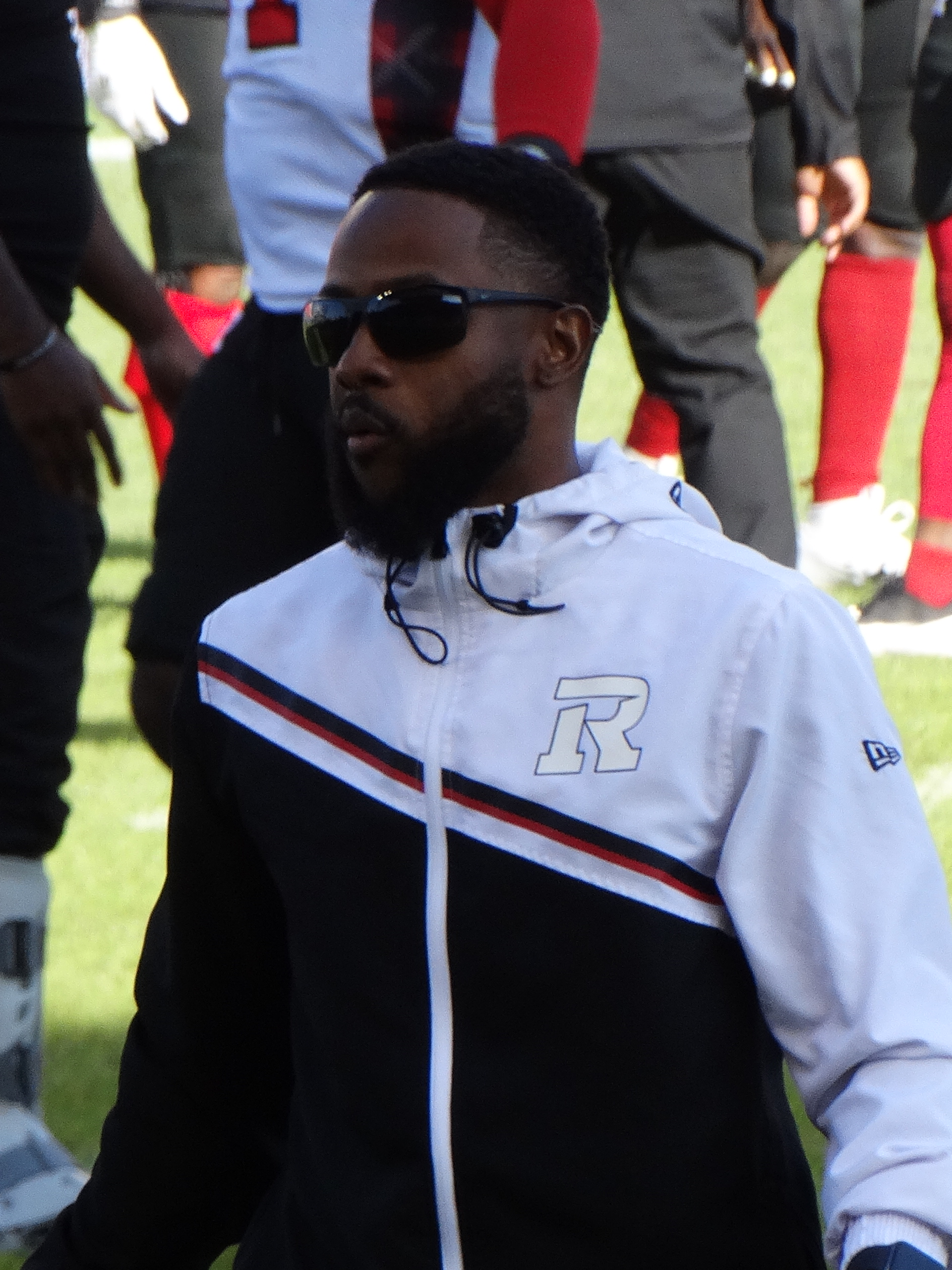
- Suber with the Ottawa Redblacks in 2024

Personal information
- Born: December 1, 1986 (age 39); Tampa, Florida, U.S.
- Listed height: 5 ft 7 in (1.70 m)
- Listed weight: 177 lb (80 kg)

Career information
- Position: Defensive back
- High school: Thomas Jefferson (FL)
- College: Middle Tennessee

Career history

Playing
- 2010–2014: Winnipeg Blue Bombers
- 2014: Toronto Argonauts
- 2015: Saskatchewan Roughriders

Coaching
- 2015: George S. Middleton HS (STC/DB)
- 2016: Fort Pierce Westwood HS (DC/DB)
- 2017: Bethune–Cookman (STA/DB/GA)
- 2018: Lyon (DC/S)
- 2018–2019: Murray State (WR/TE)
- 2020–2022: Ottawa Redblacks (WR)
- 2023: Middle Tennessee (CB)
- 2024: Ottawa Redblacks (DB)
- 2025: Florida Memorial (DC/DB)

Awards and highlights
- First-team All-Sun Belt (2009); New Orleans Bowl champion
- Stats at CFL.ca (archive)

Alex Suber (born December 1, 1986) is an American professional football coach and former professional defensive back. He most recently served as the defensive coordinator and defensive backs coach for Florida Memorial University, positions he held in 2025. He has served as the defensive backs coach for the Ottawa Redblacks of the Canadian Football League (CFL). He played for six seasons in the CFL with the Winnipeg Blue Bombers, Toronto Argonauts, and Saskatchewan Roughriders. He played college football for the Middle Tennessee Blue Raiders.

== Early life ==
Suber was a four-year letter winner in football at Thomas Jefferson High School in Tampa, Florida. As a senior, Suber rushed for 1,592 yards and 16 touchdowns despite missing three games. In his final two games (semifinals and state championship), Suber rushed for a combined 446 yards and 5 touchdowns. 221 yards and 3 touchdowns vs Monsignor Pace, followed by 225 yards and 2 touchdowns against Jacksonville Bolles HS. As a junior, Suber recorded more than 2,000 all-purpose yards and 19 touchdowns in earning a spot on the Class 3A all-state team. It was the second straight year he topped the 2,000-yard mark having done it as a sophomore as well. Rated a 2-star recruit by rivals.com and 3-star by 247sports.com, Suber had offers from Indiana, South Florida, San Diego State, Rutgers, and Ole Miss and signed with MTSU. Suber graduated Thomas Jefferson High School a member of the National Honor Society.

== College career ==
In his first collegiate game at Middle Tennessee State University, Suber rushed for 22 yards on 7 carries and 18 yards receiving with 2 catches against Alabama University No. 2 defense in the country. Unfortunately, he suffered an ACL tear and received a medical redshirt only playing 3 games his freshman year. As a Sophomore, he was second on the team with a personal-best 59 tackles and 7.5 tackles for loss, an Interception, 5 pass breakups, 3 forced fumbles, and 2 fumble recoveries. Had 5 tackles to go along with a forced fumble and a fumble recovery against No. 2 Louisiana State University. Junior year, Suber started in seven games. Ended the year with 26 tackles, a sack, 1.5 tackles for loss, 2 interceptions, 4 pass breakups, and a blocked kick. Had 3 tackles and an interception in the corner of the endzone with less than three minutes to play to seal the victory over University of Maryland while holding 1st Round NFL draft pick Darrius Heyward-Bey to only 3 receptions. Suber had a pass breakup and blocked his first career kick when he rejected a Kentucky field goal with 20 seconds to play while playing a team-high 102 snaps. Registered 5 tackles, a pass breakup, and an interception while covering 3rd Round draft pick T. Y. Hilton that he returned 60 yards against Florida International University while leading the team with 84 snaps. Suffered a broken jaw and was lost for the season. As a senior, he had 57 tackles to go along with 4.5 sacks, 2 interceptions and 2 hurries. Also led the team with 12 pass breakups and tied for 28th nationally in passes defended. Collected 8 tackles, a sack, a pass breakup, and an interception returned 56 yards in road win over University of Louisiana Monroe. In the New Orleans Bowl win over University of Southern Mississippi, Suber recorded 5 tackles, including two for loss of yards, an interception, and a pass breakup. In 2009, Suber was Named 1st team All-Sun Belt by the league's coaches and media. Named 1st team All-Sun Belt by rivals.com. Was named Sun Belt Conference Defensive Player of the Week on Nov. 30. In, 2008, he was named Sun Belt Conference Defensive Player of the Week for his play against the University of Maryland which included holding All-ACC receiver Darrius Heyward-Bey to just three catches. In 2007, Named honorable mention All-Sun Belt by the league's coaches and media. Voted a permanent team captain by his MTSU teammates.

== Professional career ==
=== Winnipeg Blue Bombers ===
On June 1, 2010, Suber signed with the Winnipeg Blue Bombers of the Canadian Football League as a free agent. He was a key player in the infamous 2011 Swaggerville defense that saw a post-season run to the 99th Grey Cup. In his first four seasons, all with the Blue Bombers, he had no fewer than 60 total tackles and also recorded six fumble recoveries.

=== Toronto Argonauts ===
Suber was traded to the Toronto Argonauts on September 2, 2014, where he registered an interception in just his second game with the team. He played in eight games for the Argonauts where he had 23 defensive tackles. He was released by the Argonauts during their 2015 training camp on June 13, 2015.

=== Saskatchewan Roughriders ===
On July 22, 2015, Suber signed with the Saskatchewan Roughriders where he played in three games to finish his career. Overall, he played in 76 career CFL regular season games and recorded 261 defensive tackles, 29 special teams tackles, 14 pass knockdowns, two interceptions, one sack, and one forced fumble. Suber signed a one-day contract with the Winnipeg Blue Bombers on January 15, 2016, in order to retire as a Blue Bomber.

== Coaching career ==
In 2015, Suber started his coaching career at George S. Middleton High School in Tampa, Florida as the Defensive Backs coach during spring football in the off-season of his final year of playing in the Canadian Football League.

In 2016, he was a Special Teams Coordinator and Secondary coach at Westwood High School in Fort Pierce, Florida.

From March to December 2017, Suber was a graduate assistant coach and football operations assistant for Bethune-Cookman University, working with the defensive backs and special teams.

In December 2017, Suber signed as the Defensive Coordinator and Secondary Coach at Lyon College.

On March 15, 2018, Suber joined the staff at Murray State University as the inside/outside receivers and tight ends coach.

On December 20, 2019, Suber was named receivers coach for the Ottawa Redblacks.

After spending a year as the cornerbacks coach for his alma mater, Middle Tennessee State, in 2023, Suber was named the defensive backs coach for the Redblacks for their 2024 season. He spent one season with the team but was not retained for the 2025 season.
