= Pierre-Luc Labbé =

Canadian football player (born 1984)

No. 47
- Position: Linebacker

Personal information
- Born: May 14, 1984 (age 42); Quebec City, Quebec
- Listed height: 6 ft 2 in (1.88 m)
- Listed weight: 229 lb (104 kg)

Career information
- College: Sherbrooke
- CFL draft: 2008: 6th round, 47th overall pick

Career history
- Winnipeg Blue Bombers (2008–2013)
- Stats at CFL.ca (archive)

Pierre-Luc Labbé (born May 14, 1984) is a Canadian former professional football linebacker for the Winnipeg Blue Bombers of the Canadian Football League. He was drafted in the sixth round with the 47th pick of the 2008 CFL draft by the Winnipeg Blue Bombers. He played CIS Football for the Sherbrooke Vert et Or.
