= Brady Browne =

Canadian football player (born 1983)

No. 25
- Position: Defensive back

Personal information
- Born: April 24, 1983 (age 43); Burnaby, British Columbia
- Listed height: 5 ft 10 in (1.78 m)
- Listed weight: 200 lb (91 kg)

Career information
- University: Manitoba
- CFL draft: 2008: 5th round, 38th overall pick

Career history
- 2008: BC Lions
- 2009: Saskatchewan Roughriders*
- 2009–2012: Winnipeg Blue Bombers
- * Offseason or practice squad member only
- Stats at CFL.ca (archive)

Brady Browne (born April 24, 1983) is a Canadian former professional football defensive back. He last played for the Winnipeg Blue Bombers of the Canadian Football League. He was drafted by the BC Lions in the fifth round of the 2008 CFL draft. He played CIS football for the Manitoba Bisons.

Browne was also a member of the Saskatchewan Roughriders.
