= Mike Renaud =

Canadian football player (born 1983)

No. 9
- Position: Punter

Personal information
- Born: May 25, 1983 (age 43); Ottawa, Ontario, Canada
- Listed height: 6 ft 3 in (1.91 m)
- Listed weight: 215 lb (98 kg)

Career information
- University: Concordia
- CFL draft: 2006: undrafted

Career history
- 2006: Montreal Alouettes*
- 2009: Calgary Stampeders*
- 2009–2014: Winnipeg Blue Bombers
- * Offseason or practice squad member only

Awards and highlights
- CFL East All-Star (2010)

Mike Renaud (born May 25, 1983) is a Canadian former professional football punter for the Winnipeg Blue Bombers of the Canadian Football League (CFL). He was signed by the Montreal Alouettes as an undrafted free agent in 2006. He played CIS Football at Concordia.

Renaud was also a member of the Mönchengladbach Mavericks, Team Ohio, and the Calgary Stampeders.

== Professional career ==
In February 2009, he signed as free agent with the Calgary Stampeders, but was then traded to the Winnipeg Blue Bombers on June 13, 2009. Within 2 years, Renaud had already achieved All-Star status as the Eastern Division's All-Star Punter in 2010.

Renaud announced his retirement from professional sports on February 5, 2015.

== Personal life ==
Renaud made his off-season home in Winnipeg and works for a local company.
