= Brandon Stewart =

American gridiron football player (born 1986)

No. 25, 21, 8, 9, 17
- Position: Defensive back

Personal information
- Born: May 16, 1986 (age 40); Seattle, Washington, U.S.
- Listed height: 6 ft 1 in (1.85 m)
- Listed weight: 200 lb (91 kg)

Career information
- College: Eastern Arizona College

Career history
- 2007–2008: Calgary Stampeders
- 2009–2013: Winnipeg Blue Bombers
- 2014–2015: Hamilton Tiger-Cats
- 2016: BC Lions
- 2017: Montreal Alouettes
- Stats at CFL.ca

Brandon Stewart (born May 16, 1986) is an American former professional football defensive back who played the Canadian Football League (CFL). Stewart began his career with the Calgary Stampeders, recording two tackles in two games over a two-year span. On February 24, 2009, Stewart signed as a free agent with the Winnipeg Blue Bombers and spent five seasons with the club. Upon becoming a free agent again, he signed with the Hamilton Tiger-Cats on February 11, 2014. He spent two years with the Tiger-Cats before entering free agency again and signing a two-year deal with the BC Lions on February 9, 2016. Following his release from BC, he signed with the Montreal Alouettes on July 10, 2017.
