= Jabari Arthur =

Canadian gridiron football player and coach (born 1982)

Edmonton Elks
- Title: Running backs coach
- CFL status: National

Personal information
- Born: August 28, 1982 (age 44); Montreal, Quebec, Canada
- Listed height: 6 ft 4 in (1.93 m)
- Listed weight: 225 lb (102 kg)

Career information
- Position: Wide receiver (No. 81)
- High school: Montreal (QC) Vanier College
- College: Akron
- CFL draft: 2007: 1st round, 6th overall pick

Career history

Playing
- Kansas City Chiefs (2008)*; Calgary Stampeders (2008–2009); Winnipeg Blue Bombers (2009); Calgary Stampeders (2010–2015)
- * Offseason or practice squad member only

Coaching
- Calgary Dinos (2017–2021) Receivers coach; Calgary Dinos (2022–2025) Offensive coordinator; Edmonton Elks (2026–present) Running backs coach

Awards and highlights
- 3× Grey Cup champion (2008, 2014, 2026); Vanier Cup champion (2019); 5 Akron Football Records

Career CFL statistics as of 2015
- Receptions: 97
- Yards: 1,162
- Touchdowns: 6
- Stats at CFL.ca (archived)

Jabari Arthur (born August 28, 1982) is a Canadian football coach who serves as the running backs coach for the Edmonton Elks of the Canadian Football League (CFL). He is a former professional wide receiver who played for eight years in the CFL. He is a two-time Grey Cup champion after winning with the Calgary Stampeders in 2008 and 2014. He is also a Vanier Cup champion with the Calgary Dinos following the team's victory in the 2019 game.

Arthur prepped at Vanier College in Montreal, winning Offensive Player-of-the-Year and Player-of-the-Year during the 2001 season. Arthur's play earned him a scholarship offer from the University of Akron, where Arthur would redshirt in 2003. After his redshirt year, new head coach J. D. Brookhart converted Arthur to a wide receiver. Currently, Arthur can be seen in the University of Akron Hall Of Fame.

He signed with the Kansas City Chiefs of the NFL as a rookie free agent. Arthur was released by the Chiefs on August 30, 2008.

== Early life ==
Arthur attended Vanier College in Montreal, Quebec. Arthur's play as a quarterback earned him the Offensive Player-of-the-Year, as well as the Player-of-the-Year for his play during the 2001 season Arthur also participated in Track and Field.

College recruiting
| Name | Hometown | School | Height | Weight | 40^{‡} | Commit date |
|---|---|---|---|---|---|---|
| Jabari Arthur; QB | Montreal, Quebec | Vanier College | 6 ft 4 in (1.93 m) | 210 lb (95 kg) | – | Jul 8, 2003 |
| Jabari Arthur; QB | Recruit ratings: Scout: Rivals: | | | | | |
Overall recruit ranking: Scout: – (QB) Rivals: – (QB), – (CAN)
Note: In many cases, Scout, Rivals, 247Sports, On3, and ESPN may conflict in their listings of height and weight.; In these cases, the average was taken. ESPN grades are on a 100-point scale.; Sources: "Akron Football Commitment List". Rivals.; "Akron College Football Recruiting Commits". Scout.; "Scout.com Team Recruiting Rankings". Scout.; "2003 Team Ranking". Rivals.com.

Arthur committed to the University of Akron on July 8, 2003. Arthur was not heavily recruited, as he only received one scholarship offer.

== College career ==
Jabari Authur played college football for the Zips. During his senior year, his Canadian Football League rights were held by the Calgary Stampeders, who drafted him in the 2007 CFL draft even though he was returning to Akron for his senior year.

=== Statistics ===
| | | | Receiving | | | | | |
| Season | Team | GS | GP | Rec | Yds | Avg | TD | Long |
|---|---|---|---|---|---|---|---|---|
| 2004 | Akron | 0 | 9 | 23 | 270 | 11.7 | 0 | 51 |
| 2005 | Akron | 2 | 12 | 30 | 482 | 16.1 | 3 | 46 |
| 2006 | Akron | 10 | 12 | 45 | 730 | 16.2 | 4 | 57 |
| 2007 | Akron | 12 | 12 | **86** | **1,171** | 13.6 | 10 | 51 |
| | Totals | 24 | 45 | **184** | **2,653** | 14.4 | 17 | 57 |

- Numbers in **Bold** are Akron school records

== Professional career ==
=== Kansas City Chiefs ===
Although eligible for the 2008 NFL draft, Arthur was not selected. He signed with the Chiefs on April 27 at the conclusion of the draft.

=== Calgary Stampeders ===
Arthur signed with the Calgary Stampeders on September 22, 2008. He won the Grey Cup championship in 2008.

=== Winnipeg Blue Bombers ===
On September 20, 2009 Arthur was traded along with fellow receiver Titus Ryan, and defensive lineman Odell Willis to the Winnipeg Blue Bombers in exchange for receivers Arjei Franklin, and Romby Bryant.

=== Calgary Stampeders (II) ===
On July 19, 2010, Arthur signed with the Calgary Stampeders. Over the span of 4 seasons, 2010 through 2013, Arthur averaged 21.5 receptions, for 261 yards, and a total of 4 pass receptions. The 2013 CFL season being by far the best of the four years; netting 41 pass receptions for 510 yards with 3 touchdowns. Following the 2013 CFL season the Stamps resigned Arthur to a new contract; he was set to become a free-agent that off-season. Arthur only caught 9 passes in the 2014 season (77 yards, 2 touchdowns). Despite the disappointing season the Stampeders extended his contract on March 11, 2015. He played in two games in 2015 where he had one catch for 14 yards. He became a free agent upon the expiry of his contract on February 9, 2016.

== Coaching career ==
After sitting out the 2016 season, Arthur was announced as the wide receivers coach for the Calgary Dinos on April 28, 2017. He won the 2019 Vanier Cup with the Dinos in his third year with the program. He was promoted to offensive coordinator on January 24, 2022. He served in that capacity for four seasons.

On February 12, 2026, it was announced that Arthur had joined the coaching staff of the Edmonton Elks as the team's running backs coach.
