= 2010 CFL season =

Canadian Football League season

- Duration: July 1 – November 7, 2010
- East champions: Montreal Alouettes
- West champions: Saskatchewan Roughriders

98th Grey Cup
- Date: November 28, 2010
- Venue: Commonwealth Stadium, Edmonton
- Champions: Montreal Alouettes

CFL seasons
- ← 2009 2011 →

Canadian Football League team locations: West, East

The 2010 CFL season is the 57th season of modern-day Canadian football. Officially, it is the 53rd Canadian Football League season. Commonwealth Stadium in Edmonton hosted the 98th Grey Cup on November 28 when the Montreal Alouettes became the first team to repeat as Grey Cup Champions in 13 years, defeating the Saskatchewan Roughriders, 21–18. The league announced on its Twitter page on January 29, 2010, that the season would start on July 1, 2010. As of 2026 this is the most recent CFL regular season to start in July.

== CFL news in 2010 ==
=== CFL retro ===
West Division Retro Jerseys

East Division Retro Jerseys

As the league approaches the 100th Grey Cup, the CFL celebrated the 1970s with all eight teams wearing retro-themed uniforms from that era during Weeks 6 and 7. Since Saskatchewan's alternate jersey is a version of the 1970s home jersey, they were the only team to wear both home and away retro jerseys during these games.

Additionally, to celebrate the 100th anniversary of the Saskatchewan Roughriders, the players donned red and black centennial jerseys that the team wore from 1912 to 1947 on July 17 when they played Edmonton at Mosaic Stadium at Taylor Field in Regina.

=== Debut of the Moncton series ===
The CFL began a series of annual games in Moncton, New Brunswick, during the 2010 season. The first game, marketed under the "Touchdown Atlantic" banner, took place on September 26, as the Edmonton Eskimos defeated the Toronto Argonauts, 24–6, in front of a sold out crowd of 20,725 at the new Moncton Stadium. Tickets for the game sold out within 32 hours of going on sale. The success of Touchdown Atlantic 2010 has moved Moncton towards a position of candidate for CFL expansion.

=== Labour agreement ===
The collective bargaining agreement between the CFL and the CFL Players' Association expires on June 5, 2010. Negotiations between the two parties have been stalled since October 2009; a meeting is scheduled on April 26, 2010, in Toronto. Stu Laird, president of the CFLPA, has sent e-mails to all players. According to Canwest News Service, the e-mails advise the players to remain unified and "It continues to be the opinion of the executive committee that a CFL management lockout of the players is a very real possibility."

On June 29, 2010, two days before the start of the regular season, it was announced that the CFL and CFLPA had agreed to a new 4-year CBA, set to expire before the 2014 CFL season. While many changes were made, the most prominent were those made to the salaries and the introduction of a drug policy. The 2010 team salary cap is set at $4,250,000 with a team salary floor of $3,900,000 and a minimum player salary of $42,000. The salary cap is set to increase $50,000 per season, reaching $4,400,000 by 2013, with the floor being $4,000,000 by that time. The minimum player salary is set to increase by $1000 per season until 2013 where it would be $45,000.

=== Rule changes ===
Like in the 2009 CFL season, another fan contest on what rule changes the fans wanted to see was done, this time the fans were asked by Commissioner Mark Cohon to focus on what changes could be made to the overtime format to improve it. While a complete overhaul of the format such as going to a "mini game" of playing two 5 minute no quarter halves or eliminating over time in the regular season, fans endorsed the current overtime format with one significant change. The four rules changes for the season approved by the rules committee, including a change to overtime the fans call on in the contest, are as follows:

Changes to overtime

- Teams that score a touchdown in overtime must go for a two-point convert by running or passing the ball into the end zone instead of kicking for a single point. A similar rule is used in United States intercollegiate football, where a similar overtime is used, starting with the third overtime session (overtime sessions are unlimited). This rule has been experimented in other football leagues like the World Football League and the XFL.

Changes in regulation

- Will allow a team that gives up a field goal the option of scrimmaging from its 35-yard line instead of receiving a kick-off. In 2009, this option was eliminated, but has been overturned as it failed to make any significant difference in entertainment value as it was intended, and was unpopular with the coaches.
- Will ensure there is no penalty for pass interference applied if a forward pass is deemed uncatchable.
- Fixing the no yards or halo rule that will result in a penalty of five instead of fifteen yards when a ball is punted, hits the ground and hits a player from the covering team.

=== Broadcasting ===
TSN remains the exclusive broadcaster for all CFL games in Canada. In the United States, the CFL ended its longstanding agreement with America One and signed a more limited deal with NFL Network, which will air 14 games for the season (as opposed to the roughly 70 games per year carried by America One). As with America One, NFL Network will simulcast the TSN broadcast. RDS remains the exclusive French broadcaster of the CFL showing all 18 Montreal Alouettes regular season games and all of the CFL Playoffs.

=== Records and milestones ===
- On October 11, 2010, Ben Cahoon became the CFL's all-time reception leader, catching his 1,007th career pass from Anthony Calvillo in a home game against the Calgary Stampeders.
- November 7, 2010, saw the first time that a regular season Buffalo Bills home game at Rogers Centre in Toronto had been played during the regular CFL season; the Bills against the Chicago Bears kicked off at 1:00 pm, while the Toronto Argonauts kicked off their final regular season game at the Montreal Alouettes at 4:00 pm.

== Regular season ==
West Division
Pos	Team	Pld	W	L	T	PF	PA	PD	Pts
1	Calgary Stampeders (C, Q)	18	13	5	0	626	459	+167	26
2	Saskatchewan Roughriders (Q)	18	10	8	0	497	488	+9	20
3	BC Lions (Q)	18	8	10	0	466	466	0	16
4	Edmonton Eskimos	18	7	11	0	382	545	−163	14

Source: "2010 Regular Season Standings". Canadian Football League. Archived from the original on August 8, 2011.
(C) First round bye; (Q) Qualified for playoffs

East Division
Pos	Team	Pld	W	L	T	PF	PA	PD	Pts
1	Montreal Alouettes (C, Q)	18	12	6	0	521	475	+46	24
2	Hamilton Tiger-Cats (Q)	18	9	9	0	481	450	+31	18
3	Toronto Argonauts (Q)	18	9	9	0	373	442	−69	18
4	Winnipeg Blue Bombers	18	4	14	0	464	485	−21	8

Source: "2010 Regular Season Standings". Canadian Football League. Archived from the original on August 8, 2011.
(C) First round bye; (Q) Qualified for playoffs

Hamilton finished ahead of Toronto in the standings because they won their head-to-head regular season series 3–0.

== Award winners ==
=== CFL Player of the Week ===
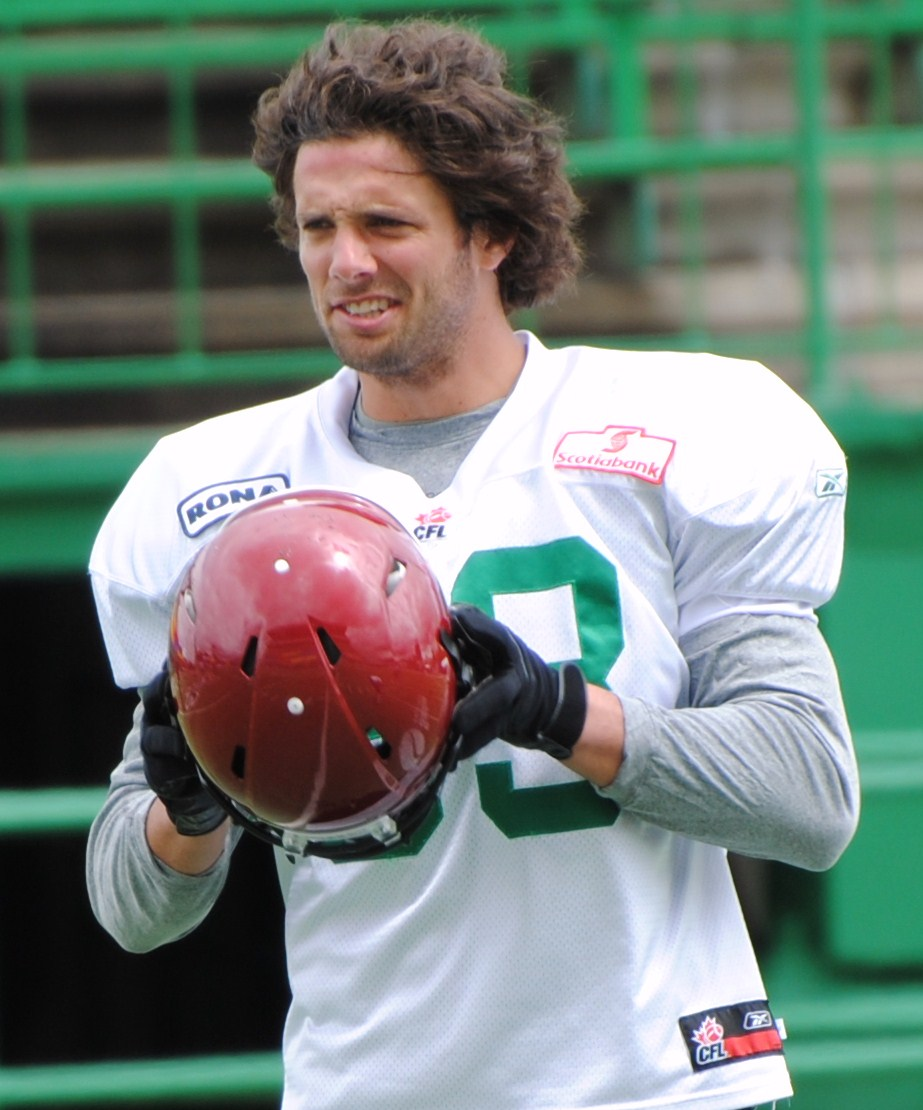
Andy Fantuz of the Saskatchewan Roughriders was named the CFL's Outstanding Canadian for the months of July and September after picking up the league's weekly honour four times.

Week	Offensive Player of the Week	Defensive Player of the Week	Special Teams Player of the Week	Outstanding Canadian
One	Darian Durant	Joe Lobendahn	Marcus Thigpen	Andy Fantuz
Two	Buck Pierce	Brent Hawkins	Chad Owens	Etienne Boulay
Three	Kevin Glenn	Maurice Lloyd	Noel Prefontaine	Dave Stala
Four	Romby Bryant	John Bowman	Jovon Johnson	Jon Cornish
Five	Arland Bruce	Chris Thompson	Luca Congi	Andy Fantuz
Six	Cory Boyd	Chip Cox	Tim Maypray	Dave Stala
Seven	Chad Owens	Jerrell Freeman	Kelly Campbell	Matt Kirk
Eight	Brandon Whitaker	Chip Cox	Jovon Johnson	Andre Durie
Nine	Ken-Yon Rambo	James Patrick	Noel Prefontaine	Jon Cornish
Ten	Kevin Glenn	Brandon Smith	Markeith Knowlton	Dave Stala
Eleven	Henry Burris	Ronald Flemons	Andrew Harris	Jerome Messam
Twelve	Andy Fantuz	Markeith Knowlton	Chad Owens	Andy Fantuz
Thirteen	Anthony Calvillo	Elliott Richardson	Yonus Davis	Elliott Richardson
Fourteen	Henry Burris	Rod Davis	Chad Owens	Andy Fantuz
Fifteen	Anthony Calvillo	Anwar Stewart	Colt David	Doug Brown
Sixteen	Daniel Porter	Stevie Baggs	Derek Schiavone	Chris Getzlaf
Seventeen	Kevin Glenn	Stevie Baggs	Chad Owens	Chris Bauman
Eighteen	Anthony Calvillo	Ryan Phillips	Chad Owens	Ian Logan
Nineteen	Travis Lulay	Keon Raymond	Justin Palardy	Spencer Watt
Twenty	Weston Dressler	Lance Frazier	Paul McCallum	Jason Clermont

=== CFL Player of the Month ===
Month	Offensive Player of the Month	Defensive Player of the Month	Special Teams Player of the Month	Outstanding Canadian
July	Anthony Calvillo	John Bowman	Marcus Thigpen	Andy Fantuz
August	Cory Boyd	Chip Cox	Yonus Davis	Kevin Eiben
September	Darian Durant	Ronald Flemons	Chad Owens	Andy Fantuz
October	Henry Burris	Stevie Baggs	Chad Owens	Andy Fantuz

== CFL playoffs ==
The Montreal Alouettes became the first team to repeat as Grey Cup Champions in 13 years, defeating the Saskatchewan Roughriders, 21–18 at Edmonton's Commonwealth Stadium. Alouettes' wide receiver Jamel Richardson was named the Grey Cup Most Valuable Player, and Roughriders' defensive tackle, Keith Shologan was named the Grey Cup Most Valuable Canadian.

=== Playoff bracket ===
November 14: Division Semi-Finals
East
E3	Toronto Argonauts	16
E2	Hamilton Tiger-Cats	13
West
W3	BC Lions	38
W2	Saskatchewan Roughriders	41*

November 21: Division Finals
E3	Toronto Argonauts	17
E1	Montreal Alouettes	48
W2	Saskatchewan Roughriders	20
W1	Calgary Stampeders	16

November 28: 98th Grey Cup; Commonwealth Stadium – Edmonton
E1	Montreal Alouettes	21
W2	Saskatchewan Roughriders	18

*-Team won in Double Overtime.

== CFL leaders ==
- CFL passing leaders
- CFL rushing leaders
- CFL receiving leaders

== 2010 CFL All-Stars ==
=== Offence ===
- QB – Henry Burris, Calgary Stampeders
- RB – Cory Boyd, Toronto Argonauts
- RB – Fred Reid, Winnipeg Blue Bombers
- WR – Arland Bruce III, Hamilton Tiger-Cats
- SB – Andy Fantuz, Saskatchewan Roughriders
- SB – Nik Lewis, Calgary Stampeders
- WR – Terrence Edwards, Winnipeg Blue Bombers
- OT – Ben Archibald, Calgary Stampeders
- OT – Rob Murphy, Toronto Argonauts
- OG – Scott Flory, Montreal Alouettes
- OG – Dimitri Tsoumpas, Calgary Stampeders
- OC – Marwan Hage, Hamilton Tiger-Cats

=== Defence ===
- DT – Doug Brown, Winnipeg Blue Bombers
- DT – Kevin Huntley, Toronto Argonauts
- DE – Phillip Hunt, Winnipeg Blue Bombers
- DE – John Bowman, Montreal Alouettes
- LB – Chip Cox, Montreal Alouettes
- LB – Markeith Knowlton, Hamilton Tiger-Cats
- LB – Juwan Simpson, Calgary Stampeders
- CB – Dwight Anderson, Calgary Stampeders
- CB – Brandon Browner, Calgary Stampeders
- DB – Ryan Phillips, BC Lions
- DB – Chris Thompson, Edmonton Eskimos
- S – James Patrick, Saskatchewan Roughriders

=== Special teams ===
- K – Paul McCallum, BC Lions
- P – Burke Dales, Calgary Stampeders
- ST – Chad Owens, Toronto Argonauts

== 2010 CFL Western All-Stars ==
=== Offence ===
- QB – Henry Burris, Calgary Stampeders
- RB – Wes Cates, Saskatchewan Roughriders
- RB – Joffrey Reynolds, Calgary Stampeders
- WR – Romby Bryant, Calgary Stampeders
- SB – Andy Fantuz, Saskatchewan Roughriders
- SB – Nik Lewis, Calgary Stampeders
- WR – Fred Stamps, Edmonton Eskimos
- OT – Ben Archibald, Calgary Stampeders
- OT – Gene Makowsky, Saskatchewan Roughriders
- OG – Jovan Olafioye, BC Lions
- OG – Dimitri Tsoumpas, Calgary Stampeders
- OC – Jeremy O'Day, Saskatchewan Roughriders

=== Defence ===
- DT – DeVone Claybrooks, Calgary Stampeders
- DT – Tom Johnson, Calgary Stampeders
- DE – Charleston Hughes, Calgary Stampeders
- DE – Brent Johnson, BC Lions
- LB – Korey Banks, BC Lions
- LB – Barrin Simpson, Saskatchewan Roughriders
- LB – Juwan Simpson, Calgary Stampeders
- CB – Dwight Anderson, Calgary Stampeders
- CB – Brandon Browner, Calgary Stampeders
- DB – Ryan Phillips, BC Lions
- DB – Chris Thompson, Edmonton Eskimos
- S – James Patrick, Saskatchewan Roughriders

=== Special teams ===
- K – Paul McCallum, BC Lions
- P – Burke Dales, Calgary Stampeders
- ST – Yonus Davis, BC Lions

== 2010 CFL Eastern All-Stars ==
=== Offence ===
- QB – Anthony Calvillo, Montreal Alouettes
- RB – Cory Boyd, Toronto Argonauts
- RB – Fred Reid, Winnipeg Blue Bombers
- WR – Arland Bruce III, Hamilton Tiger-Cats
- WR – Terrence Edwards, Winnipeg Blue Bombers
- WR – Jamel Richardson, Montreal Alouettes
- WR – Dave Stala, Hamilton Tiger-Cats
- OT – Josh Bourke, Montreal Alouettes
- OT – Rob Murphy, Toronto Argonauts
- OG – Scott Flory, Montreal Alouettes
- OG – Brendon LaBatte, Winnipeg Blue Bombers
- OC – Marwan Hage, Hamilton Tiger-Cats

=== Defence ===
- DT – Doug Brown, Winnipeg Blue Bombers
- DT – Kevin Huntley, Toronto Argonauts
- DE – John Bowman, Montreal Alouettes
- DE – Phillip Hunt, Winnipeg Blue Bombers
- LB – Chip Cox, Montreal Alouettes
- LB – Kevin Eiben, Toronto Argonauts
- LB – Markeith Knowlton, Hamilton Tiger-Cats
- CB – Mark Estelle, Montreal Alouettes
- CB – Jovon Johnson, Winnipeg Blue Bombers
- DB – Jerald Brown, Montreal Alouettes
- DB – Lin-J Shell, Toronto Argonauts
- S – Willie Pile, Toronto Argonauts

=== Special teams ===
- K – Damon Duval, Montreal Alouettes
- P – Mike Renaud, Winnipeg Blue Bombers
- ST – Chad Owens, Toronto Argonauts

== 2010 CFLPA Pro Player All-Stars ==
=== Offence ===
- QB: Anthony Calvillo, Montreal Alouettes
- OT: Ben Archibald, Calgary Stampeders
- OT: Dan Goodspeed, Saskatchewan Roughriders
- OG: Cedric Gagne-Marcoux, Toronto Argonauts
- OG: Patrick Kabongo, Edmonton Eskimos
- C: Marwan Hage, Hamilton Tiger Cats
- RB: Cory Boyd, Toronto Argonauts
- RB: Fred Reid, Winnipeg Blue Bombers
- SB: Arland Bruce III, Hamilton Tiger Cats
- SB: Fred Stamps, Edmonton Eskimos
- WR: Romby Bryant. Calgary Stampeders
- WR: Jamal Richardson, Montreal Alouettes

=== Defence ===
- DE: Phillip Hunt, Winnipeg Blue Bombers
- DE: Odell Willis, Winnipeg Blue Bombers
- DT: Doug Brown, Winnipeg Blue Bombers
- DT: Dario Romero, Edmonton Eskimos
- LB: Chip Cox, Montreal Alouettes
- LB: Barrin Simpson, Saskatchewan Roughriders
- LB: Solomon Elimimian, BC Lions
- CB: Brandon Browner, Calgary Stampeders
- CB: Dwight Anderson Calgary Stampeders
- HB: Korey Banks, BC Lions
- HB: Chris Thompson, Edmonton Eskimos
- S: James Patrick, Saskatchewan Roughriders

=== Special teams ===
- PK: Paul McCallum, BC Lions
- KR/PR: Chad Owens, Toronto Argonauts
- P: Burke Dales, Calgary Stampeders

=== Head coach ===
- HC: Jim Barker, Toronto Argonauts

== 2010 Gibson's Finest CFL Awards ==
- CFL's Most Outstanding Player Award – Henry Burris (QB), Calgary Stampeders
- CFL's Most Outstanding Canadian Award – Andy Fantuz (SB), Saskatchewan Roughriders
- CFL's Most Outstanding Defensive Player Award – Markeith Knowlton (DB), Hamilton Tiger-Cats
- CFL's Most Outstanding Offensive Lineman Award – Ben Archibald (OT), Calgary Stampeders
- CFL's Most Outstanding Rookie Award – Solomon Elimimian (LB), BC Lions
- John Agro Special Teams Award – Chad Owens (WR), Toronto Argonauts
- Tom Pate Memorial Award – Wes Lysack (DB), Calgary Stampeders
- Jake Gaudaur Veterans' Trophy – Mike McCullough (LB), Saskatchewan Roughriders
- Annis Stukus Trophy – Jim Barker, Toronto Argonauts
- Commissioner's Award – Rider Nation (The award was given to the entire Rider fan base; it is usually only given to an individual).
- Hugh Campbell Distinguished Leadership Award - Tony Proudfoot, Montreal Alouettes
