= Stan Schwartz =

Profile
- Positions: President, general manager, assistant coach

Personal information
- Born: 1943 or 1944 (age 82–83) near Medicine Hat, Alberta, Canada

Career information
- College: Mount Royal College; University of Calgary

Career history

Coaching
- 1976–1983: Calgary Stampeders (AC)

Operations
- 1995: Calgary Stampeders (VP and GM of administration)
- 1996–2003: Calgary Stampeders (President)
- 2005–2012: Calgary Stampeders (General partner)
- 2012–2016: Calgary Stampeders (Executive VP and consultant)

Awards and highlights
- Hugh Campbell Distinguished Leadership Award (2009); As an executive: 4× Grey Cup champion (1998, 2001, 2008, 2014)
- Canadian Football Hall of Fame (Class of 2017)

Stan Schwartz (born 1943 or 1944) is a Canadian former football executive and coach. He served in various capacities with the Calgary Stampeders of the Canadian Football League (CFL), beginning his tenure with the team in 1976, as an assistant coach. He later served as the team's president from 1996 to 2003. Schwartz was inducted into the Canadian Football Hall of Fame in 2017.

== Life and career ==
Born in southern Alberta, near Medicine Hat, Schwartz played football at Mount Royal College and the University of Calgary. In 1969, he became an assistant coach at Ernest Manning High School in Calgary. In 1970, Schwartz began his teaching career, working with the Calgary Board of Education. Afterwards, he moved to the United States, coaching football at and receiving a master's degree from Indiana State University. Schwartz spent time coaching other sports as well, including high school football, wrestling, track and field, junior football, and bantam. He was particularly involved in wrestling, coaching a city high school championship team and serving as an assistant coach for the Alberta Junior Olympic Teams. Schwartz also built football practice equipment for Calgary high schools.

In 1976, Schwartz became an assistant coach with Calgary Stampeders, a position he served in for eight years. After leaving the position, he became the manager of McMahon Stadium, the Stampeders' home stadium. During his time in the position, the stadium served as the venue for the opening and closing ceremonies of the 1988 Winter Olympics. In 1995, he returned to the Stampeders, becoming the organization's vice president and general manager of administration. The following year, he became the Stampeders' team president. In September 2003, he was replaced by Mark McLoughlin and formally announced his resignation from the position in October. During his tenure as the team's president, the Stampeders won two Grey Cup championships (in 1998 and 2001), with Calgary also serving as the host of the 88th Grey Cup in 2000. He then served as a general partner for the team from 2005 to 2012, and later as an executive vice president and consultant in various roles until 2016.

== Awards and recognition ==
In 2005, Schwartz was inducted into the Alberta Sports Hall of Fame. Schwartz was honoured with the Hugh Campbell Distinguished Leadership Award in 2009. He was later inducted into the Canadian Football Hall of Fame as a builder in 2017.

Schwartz's contributions to high school football in the Calgary area have led to trophies being named after him. The Calgary Senior High School Athletic Association (CSHAA) has awarded the "Stan Schwartz Award" annually to the "top Calgary high school volunteer football coach" since 2000. Later, in 2009, the Stampeders introduced the "Stan Schwartz – Heart of a Champion Award" to student-athletes competing in CSHAA competitions.
