= Kevin Huntley =

Kevin Huntley may refer to:

- Kevin Huntley (gridiron football) (born 1982), defensive end
- Kevin Huntley (lacrosse) (born 1986), lacrosse player
