= Ken-Yon Rambo =

American gridiron football player (born 1978)

No. 87
- Position: Wide receiver

Personal information
- Born: October 4, 1978 (age 48); Long Beach, California, U.S.
- Listed height: 6 ft 1 in (1.85 m)
- Listed weight: 207 lb (94 kg)

Career information
- High school: Long Beach Polytechnic
- College: Ohio State
- NFL draft: 2001: 7th round, 229th overall pick

Career history
- 2001: Oakland Raiders*
- 2001–2002: Dallas Cowboys
- 2003: New York Jets
- 2005–2011: Calgary Stampeders
- 2012: Toronto Argonauts
- * Offseason or practice squad member only

Awards and highlights
- Grey Cup champion (2008, 2012); CFL All-Star (2008); CFL West All-Star (2008)
- Stats at Pro Football Reference
- Stats at CFL.ca (archive)

Ken-Yon Cedric Rambo (born October 4, 1978) is an American former professional football wide receiver who played in the Canadian Football League (CFL) and National Football League (NFL). He played college football at Ohio State University.

== Early life ==
Rambo attended Long Beach Polytechnic High School, playing football and running track. In his senior year (1997) he caught a school record 79 passes for 1,096 yards (13.9 yard average) and 17 touchdowns. He received prep All-American and All-state honors.

In 1997, he won the CIF California State Meet in the 300 meter hurdles.

== College career ==
Rambo accepted a football scholarship from Ohio State University. As a freshman, he had 7 receptions for 145 yards and one touchdown. As a sophomore, he collected 5 receptions for 77 yards, 2 kickoff returns for 237 yards (18.8 yard average) and 19 punts returns for 128 yards (6.7 yard average).

As a junior, he was named a starter at wide receiver posting 41 receptions (second on the team) for 833 yards (20.3 yard average) and 6 touchdowns. He returned 21 kickoffs for 653 yards and a 21.1 yard average, breaking the school single-season record. Against Ohio University, he tallied 7 receptions for 181 yards (eighth in school history), with a 25.6 yard average, including 68 and 15 yard touchdown receptions.

As a senior, he registered a career-high 53 receptions (ninth in school history) for 794 yards (15 yard average) and 2 touchdowns. He returned 17 kickoffs for 478 yards (28.1 yard average) and 23 punts for 145 yards (6.3 yard average).

He finished his collegiate career with 106 receptions (eighth in school history), 1,849 career receiving yards (seventh in school history) and 64 kickoff returns (school record) for a 22.9 yard average.

== Professional career ==
=== Oakland Raiders ===
Rambo was selected by the Oakland Raiders in the seventh round (229th overall) of the 2001 NFL draft. He was waived on August 28.

=== Dallas Cowboys ===
On September 5, 2001, he was signed as a free agent by the Dallas Cowboys. He was declared inactive in the first 2 games and played mostly as a return specialist.

In 2002, he saw more time as the third receiver after the season ending neck injury to Raghib Ismail, posting 14 receptions for 211 yards. Against the Detroit Lions, he was the primary returner in place of an injured Reggie Swinton, registering 4 kickoff returns for 63 yards and 4 punt returns for 2 yards. Against the Jacksonville Jaguars, he had a career-high 65 receiving yards, including a career-long 47 yard reception to set up the game-winning touchdown. He was released on August 31, 2003.

=== New York Jets ===
On December 9, 2003, he was signed by the New York Jets, but was not utilized in games. In 2004, he was limited with a hamstring injury in training camp and was cut on September 4.

=== Calgary Stampeders ===
On May 29, 2005, he signed a contract with the Calgary Stampeders of the Canadian Football League. He finished third on the team in receiving with 789 yards, along with 57 receptions and 3 touchdowns.

In 2006, he was fourth on the team in receiving with 704 yards, along with 60 receptions for 5 touchdowns. In 2007, he ranked third on the team with 983 receiving yards and tied with teammate Jeremaine Copeland and D.J. Flick for first in the league in receiving touchdowns with 10.

The 2008 season saw Rambo lead the league in total receiving yards with 1,473 on 100 receptions to go along with 8 touchdowns, helping his team reach the Western Final playoff game. The Stampeders would go on to win the 96th Grey Cup 22–14 over the Montreal Alouettes.

In 2009, he lost for the season after 3 games with a torn ACL. In 2010, he recorded 72 receptions for 1,172 yards and 8 touchdowns.

He was released by the Stampeders on June 23, 2012, after seven seasons with the team, due to an achilles tendon injury. At the time he ranked eighth overall on Calgary's all-time list for receptions and receiving yards and 10th on touchdown receptions.

=== Toronto Argonauts ===
On August 21, 2012, Rambo was added to the Toronto Argonauts' practice roster. After a partial season with the Argonauts, he was released on February 5, 2013.

On September 4, 2015, Calgary signed Rambo to a one-day contract, allowing him to retire as a Stampeder. He finished his Canadian Football League career with 103 games, 416 receptions, 6,119 yards and 40 touchdowns (39 receiving and one rushing). He also returned 50 punts for 463 yards and 4 kickoffs for 60 yards.
