= Ben Archibald =

American football player (born 1978)

No. 60
- Position: Offensive tackle

Personal information
- Born: August 26, 1978 (age 48); Tacoma, Washington, U.S.
- Listed height: 6 ft 3 in (1.91 m)
- Listed weight: 320 lb (145 kg)

Career information
- High school: Seaside (Seaside, Oregon)
- College: BYU
- NFL draft: 2003: undrafted

Career history
- San Francisco 49ers (2003)*; New Orleans Saints (2003–2004)*; Amsterdam Admirals (2005); New Orleans Saints (2005–2006); Calgary Stampeders (2008–2010); BC Lions (2011–2013)
- * Offseason or practice squad member only

Awards and highlights
- 2× Grey Cup champion (2008, 2011); CFL's Most Outstanding Offensive Lineman (2010); DeMarco-Becket Memorial Trophy (2009, 2010); 2× CFL All-Star (2009, 2010); 4× CFL West All-Star (2009–2012); World Bowl champion (XIII); Second-team All-MW (2001)

Career NFL statistics
- Games played: 5
- Games started: 0
- Stats at Pro Football Reference
- Stats at CFL.ca (archive)

Ben Archibald (born August 26, 1978) is an American former professional football player who was an offensive tackle in the National Football League (NFL) and Canadian Football League (CFL). He was signed by the San Francisco 49ers as an undrafted free agent in 2003. He played college football for the BYU Cougars.

Archibald also played for the Amsterdam Admirals, New Orleans Saints and Calgary Stampeders. He won the Grey Cup with the Stamps in 2008 and with BC Lions in 2011.

In 2010, Archibald won the CFL's Most Outstanding Offensive Lineman Award.
