= Dimitri Tsoumpas =

Canadian gridiron football player (born 1985)

Profile
- Position: Guard

Personal information
- Born: September 26, 1985 (age 41); Edmonton, Alberta, Canada
- Listed height: 6 ft 4 in (1.93 m)
- Listed weight: 315 lb (143 kg)

Career information
- High school: Strathcona
- College: Weber State
- CFL draft: 2008: 1st round, 2nd overall pick

Career history
- 2008–2009: Calgary Stampeders
- 2010: Miami Dolphins*
- 2010–2013: Calgary Stampeders
- * Offseason or practice squad member only

Awards and highlights
- Grey Cup champion (2008); 3× CFL All-Star (2010–2012); 4× CFL West All-Star (2009–2012); Second-team All-Big Sky (2007)
- Stats at CFL.ca

Dimitri Tsoumpas [ZOOM-pus] (born September 26, 1985) is a Canadian former professional football guard who played for the Calgary Stampeders of the Canadian Football League (CFL). He was drafted by the Stampeders second overall in the 2008 CFL draft. He played college football for Weber State.

== College career ==
After playing for three straight city championship teams at Strathcona Composite High School he signed on to play at Weber State University. As a true freshman, Tsoumpas was a part of the starting lineup until he was injured. As a junior in 2006 he was named Honorable Mention All-Big Sky. During his senior season, Tsoumpas helped Weber State allow the fewest sacks in the conference, he also helped Trevyn Smith lead the Big Sky in rushing yards for the second year in a row. He was named Second-team All-Big Sky.

== Professional career ==
=== Calgary Stampeders ===
At the 2008 CFL draft Evaluation Camp, Tsoumpas benched 30 times to be one the leaders in that category at the camp. He was considered a possible top pick in the draft, however it was heavily rumored he could try to make an NFL team. A few days before the draft, the Edmonton Eskimos were reportedly considering Tsoumpas, Keith Shologan and Samuel Giguere. However Shologan and Giguere signed contracts with NFL teams. After a draft day trade with the Edmonton Eskimos, the Calgary Stampeders acquired the second overall pick in the 2008 CFL draft and used it to draft Tsoumpas. He was named the starting right guard, while fellow rookie Jesse Newman was the starting left guard. He debuted for Calgary, in week one against the BC Lions. Tsoumpas started all 18 games including all playoff games which included the 96th Grey Cup. He helped Calgary's running backs average 134.6 yards per game with 6.4 yards per carry. He was also key in helping the Stampeders allow the fewest sacks in the CFL. Joffrey Reynolds the CFL's leading rusher gained 1,310 yards with the help of Tsoumpas. Following the season he was Calgary's nominee for the CFL's Most Outstanding Rookie award.

Tsoumpas was expected to remain a starter in 2009.

After sustaining a concussion during the 2013 CFL season, Tsoumpas announced his retirement on January 29, 2014.

=== Miami Dolphins ===
Tsoumpas agreed to terms with the Miami Dolphins of the National Football League on January 8, 2010. Tsoumpas was waived on July 30 and returned to the Calgary Stampeders.
