= Jake Ireland =

Canadian football official

Profile
- Position: Referee

Personal information
- Born: December 1, 1946 (age 79); Hamilton, Ontario

Career information
- College: McMaster University

Career history

Official
- 1979–2008: CFL Official
- Canadian Football Hall of Fame (Class of 2013)

John "Jake" Ireland (born December 1, 1946) is a former referee in the Canadian Football League, who wore uniform number 62, and current lead replay official for the league's instant replay command centre.

== Life ==
Ireland, from Townsend, Ontario, attended Burlington Central High School from 1960 to 1965. Ireland's father, Garnet Ireland, as well as his three brothers and a sister, also attended BCHS. While at Central, Ireland participated in basketball, cross-country running, and curling. He was also an active member of Student’s Council, and was proud to win a Mathematics Award in 1964.

While attending McMaster University, Ireland was contacted by a high school friend to begin officiating flag football for the newly created Burlington Minor Football Association. Soon after, Ireland was contacted to begin officiating for the Lakeshore Football Association, including refereeing games for the Burlington Braves Club. It was during a Braves game that Ireland was recruited by the Canadian Football League to begin his career with the CFL as a referee, a career that would find him participating in 555 games and refereeing in 15 Grey Cup games.

Although he retired from his full-time career with Stelco Inc. after 31 years, Ireland continued as an active CFL referee until the conclusion of the 2008 CFL season, his 30th. His final on-field game was the 96th Grey Cup.

On June 26, 2009, the CFL announced that Ireland is the lead replay official for the new Replay Command Centre that decides all instant replay decisions starting in the 2009 CFL season.

On February 21, 2013 the Canadian Football Hall of Fame announced that Ireland would be inducted into the Hall in September at a ceremony in Edmonton.

== Highlights ==
- June 12, 1979 First CFL game as an official (Ottawa vs. Montreal)
- Total Games Officiated: 555
- Grey Cup Games: 15 (12 as referee)
- 1976 Most Improved Official — Lakeshore Football Officials Association
- 1979 Officiated in the National Junior Football Championship
- 2003 Wall of Fame — Lakeshore Football Officials Association
- 1985–1988 Selected as Head Referee in four consecutive Grey Cup games
- 2013 Inducted into the Canadian Football Hall of Fame.
