= Markeith Knowlton =

American gridiron football player (born 1983)

No. 42, 25
- Position: Linebacker

Personal information
- Born: April 6, 1983 (age 43); McKinney, Texas, U.S.
- Listed height: 6 ft 0 in (1.83 m)
- Listed weight: 205 lb (93 kg)

Career information
- College: North Texas (2001–2004)

Career history
- 2006–2007: BC Lions
- 2008–2013: Hamilton Tiger-Cats

Awards and highlights
- Grey Cup champion (2006); James P. McCaffrey Trophy (2010); 3× CFL All-Star (2008, 2009, 2010); 3× CFL East All-Star (2008, 2009, 2010); Second-team All-Sun Belt (2004)
- Stats at CFL.ca

Markeith Knowlton (born April 6, 1983) is an American former professional football linebacker who played for the BC Lions and Hamilton Tiger-Cats of the Canadian Football League. He played college football at the University of North Texas.

== College career ==
Knowlton was a four-year letterman at the University of North Texas from 2001 to 2004.

== Professional career ==
After going undrafted in the 2005 NFL draft, Knowlton had a brief tryout with the Cleveland Browns in April 2005 but was not signed.

=== BC Lions ===
Knowlton was signed by the BC Lions on April 27, 2006. In his first year in (2006), he had 1 interception, 8 tackles and 14 special team tackles in 15 games. Knowlton helped BC win the 2006 Grey Cup. He spent 2 seasons with the Lions receiving additional playing time in his second season with the club.

=== Hamilton Tiger-Cats ===
Knowlton was traded on April 29, 2008, from BC Lions to the Hamilton Tiger-Cats along with kicker Ara Tchobanian in exchange for the 9th overall selection in the 2008 CFL draft. In both the 2008 and 2009 CFL seasons Knowlton amassed more than 90 tackles. For the 2010 CFL season, he was award the CFL's Most Outstanding Defensive Player Award after recording 71 tackles, three sacks, three interceptions, and six fumble recoveries. His 2011 CFL season was not as productive statistically as his previous 3 seasons, totaling only 64 tackles. Injury slowed his production in the 2012 CFL season, only playing in 7 of the 18 regular season games. Following a Week 4 blowout in the 2013 CFL season Knowlton was released by the Tiger-Cats.
