= Marwan Hage =

Lebanese gridiron football player (born 1981)

Profile
- Position: Centre

Personal information
- Born: September 14, 1981 (age 45); Beirut, Lebanon
- Listed height: 6 ft 2 in (1.88 m)
- Listed weight: 291 lb (132 kg)

Career information
- College: Colorado
- CFL draft: 2004: 2nd round, 14th overall pick
- Expansion draft: 2013: 3rd round

Career history
- 2004: Jacksonville Jaguars*
- 2004–2013: Hamilton Tiger-Cats
- 2014: Ottawa Redblacks*
- * Offseason or practice squad member only

Awards and highlights
- CFL All-Star (2010); 2× CFL East All-Star (2007, 2010); 4× CFLPA All-Star Team (2007, 2008, 2009, 2010); Tom Pate Memorial Award (2009); Leo Dandurand Trophy (2010)
- Stats at CFL.ca

Marwan Hage (Arabic: مروان حاج, Marwān Ḥāja) (born September 14, 1981) is a former offensive lineman who played for the Hamilton Tiger-Cats of the Canadian Football League. Hage played college football for the Colorado Buffaloes. He emigrated from Beirut, Lebanon to Montreal in 1990. He participated in the Jacksonville Jaguars' 2004 training camp. During his retirement announcement in 2014, Hage revealed that he would become the owner of two Tim Hortons franchises in Toronto, Ontario.

== Professional career ==
=== Hamilton Tiger-Cats ===
Hage was selected by the Tiger-Cats in second round of the 2004 CFL draft. In 2006, he founded the Hage's Heroes program which sends under-privileged children to Hamilton Tiger-Cats home games. In 2009, he was awarded the Tom Pate Memorial Award for his contributions to the Hamilton community. He was named a CFL East All-Star in 2007 and a CFLPA (Canadian Football League Players Association) All-Star in 2007 and 2008. He also won the Leo Dandurand Trophy in 2010 as the Most Outstanding Lineman in the East Division. During the final game played at Ivor Wynne Stadium, Hage was named to the All-Time Hamilton Tiger-Cats Team. He also was a member of the Hamilton Tiger-Cats 2013 East Division championship team and played in the 2013 Grey Cup.

=== Ottawa Redblacks ===
He was acquired by the Ottawa Redblacks in the third round of the 2013 CFL Expansion Draft. Instead of playing for the RedBlacks, Hage announced his retirement on April 14, 2014. On Tuesday, May 13, his playing rights were acquired by the Calgary Stampeders along with the first overall selection in the 2014 CFL Draft in exchange for Jon Gott.

== Politics ==
Hage ran for the Conservative Party of Canada nomination in Hamilton East—Stoney Creek for the 2019 Canadian federal election, but was not the party's nominee that year.
