= Romby Bryant =

American gridiron football player (born 1979)

No. 84
- Position: Wide receiver

Personal information
- Born: December 21, 1979 (age 46); Oklahoma City, Oklahoma, U.S.
- Listed height: 6 ft 1 in (1.85 m)
- Listed weight: 191 lb (87 kg)

Career information
- College: Tulsa
- NFL draft: 2004: undrafted

Career history
- Arizona Cardinals (2004)*; Atlanta Falcons (2005); Baltimore Ravens (2006–2007)*; Winnipeg Blue Bombers (2008–2009); Calgary Stampeders (2009–2012); Toronto Argonauts (2013); Winnipeg Blue Bombers (2014); Calgary Stampeders (2015)*
- * Offseason or practice squad member only

Awards and highlights
- Second-team All-WAC (2003)
- Stats at Pro Football Reference
- Stats at CFL.ca (archive)

Romby Bryant (born December 21, 1979) is an American former professional football wide receiver. Bryant spent the majority of his professional career playing for the Winnipeg Blue Bombers and Calgary Stampeders of the Canadian Football League. He was signed by the Arizona Cardinals as an undrafted free agent in 2004. He played college football at Tulsa. He graduated from Western Heights High School in Oklahoma City in 1999.

Bryant was also a member of the Atlanta Falcons, Baltimore Ravens, and Toronto Argonauts.

== Professional career ==
=== NFL ===
==== Arizona Cardinals ====
Bryant went undrafted during the 2004 NFL draft; becoming a free-agent. He was a member of the Arizona Cardinals in 2004.

==== Atlanta Falcons ====
He made the 53 man roster with the Atlanta Falcons for the 2005 NFL season, appearing in 3 games, but making no catches.

==== Baltimore Ravens ====
He spend the 2006 and 2007 NFL seasons with the Baltimore Ravens, but did not appear in any regular season games during those two seasons.

=== CFL ===
==== First stint for the Winnipeg Blue Bombers ====
Following 3 seasons in the NFL, Bryant went north of the border signing with the Winnipeg Blue Bombers of the Canadian Football League. Bryant had a breakout rookie season in the CFL, amassing 65 receptions for 1,206 yards (career high) with 9 touchdowns. Through the first 11 regular season games of the 2009 CFL season Bryant contributed only 20 catches for 232 yards with 0 touchdowns. On September 20, 2009 Bryant was traded to the Calgary Stampeders along with Arjei Franklin in exchange for Jabari Arthur and Titus Ryan.

==== First stint for the Calgary Stampeders ====
Romby Bryant played in the remaining 7 games during the 2008 season, producing 27 receptions for 548 yards. In his first full season with the Stampeders Bryant had a career year. He set personal bests in receptions with 78 and touchdowns with 15; he also contributed an impressive 1,170 receiving yards. Bryant's next two seasons with the Stampeders were less outstanding, but still solid; averaging 53 catches for 655 yards over both seasons.

==== Toronto Argonauts ====
Romby Bryant spent one season with the Toronto Argonauts of the Canadian Football League. Catching only 8 passes for 91 yards.

==== Second stint for the Winnipeg Blue Bombers ====
Bryant returned to the Bombers for the 2014 season. He finished sixth on the team in receiving yards, totaling 317.

==== Second stint for the Calgary Stampeders ====
On April 13, 2015 Bryant signed a one-day contract with the Calgary Stampeders, allowing him to retire as a Stampeder.
