= Strathcona High School =

10-12 school in Edmonton, Alberta (est. 1908)

Strathcona High School (Scona)

Location
- 10450 - 72 Ave; Edmonton, Alberta, T6E 0Z6; Canada; 53°30′32″N 113°29′57″W

Information
- School type: Public secondary
- Motto: Ut qui ministrat (As one who serves)
- Established: 1908
- School board: Edmonton Public Schools
- Principal: Brad Mamchur
- Grades: 10–12
- Enrollment: 1,660 (2022–2023)
- Campus size: 18,699 m^{2} (201,270 sq ft)
- Colours: Scarlet and Gold
- Mascot: Gaylord the Lion
- Team name: Lords
- Budget: $10,142,214.00 (2018-2019)
- Website: strathcona.epsb.ca

Strathcona High School, colloquially referred to as Scona and SCHS, is a public high school located in Edmonton, Alberta. The school was referred to as Strathcona Composite High School until 2014. A $6.1 million modernization project was completed in 2015 and the school now enrolls approximately 1700 students.

== Overview ==
The original Strathcona High School opened in 1908, in the city of Strathcona, Alberta. The school, like the city, were named after Lord Strathcona, a pioneering Scottish businessman and Canadian Parliamentarian, who was very influential in the construction of the Canadian Pacific Railway. The school, today's "Old Scona", was operated by the Strathcona public school district. At its start housed the University of Alberta, formerly temporarily housed in Queen Alexandra School.

The city of Strathcona and the city of Edmonton amalgamated in 1912, with the school joining the Edmonton Public Schools system. By 1950s the Strathcona High had outgrown its 1908 building. In 1955, the school transferred 10 blocks south to a newly built structure (the current building), on a large block of parkland, the former Strathcona sports grounds. (The original 1908 building went through various uses before becoming Old Scona Academic High School in 1976.)

Strathcona is located on Edmonton's south side, just south of the Old Strathcona historic district, in the Queen Alexandra community.

The school houses about 60 classrooms, several computer labs, two gymnasiums, a library media centre with networked CDs, a cafeteria, and a fitness centre. A community pool, once operated by River City Recreation, a private contractor, has been demolished and removed from its north side. Outside the school, the track team uses Rollie Miles Athletic Field. This field was also used as a training facility for the 1978 Commonwealth Games, the 2001 IAAF World Championships in Athletics, the 2005 World Masters Games and hosted olympic trials for the 2016 Summer Olympics. Other facilities nearby the school include South Side Sports Arena, which Phys Ed classes use for the skating unit.

Strathcona High School teams use the team name "Strathcona (or Scona) Lords", referring to their school mascot.

At the main entrance of the school, known as the Michener Entrance, an old lamp from the original Old Scona building is on during school hours and hangs above the Strathcona crest which, out of respect, students and staff will not walk across.

== Global Initiatives ==
Since 2008, Strathcona High School has united annually to turn the motto “as one who serves” into reality. As of 2019, students have raised over $3 million. Below is a brief overview of previous campaigns:

=== Take a Spin For Chelsea (2008) ===
- Take a Spin for Chelsea was a fundraiser and spirit raiser for Chelsea, a student who suffered a horrific car accident that caused her to lose function in her legs, and become a paraplegic. The school raised $27,000 to help with wheelchair accessibility at home and at school.

=== Spread the Word (2009) ===
- $30,000 helped give the gift of literacy to children by building a school at an HIV orphanage in Bumala, Kenya.

=== Play it Forward (2010) ===
- $54,500 helped support programs that use play as a tool to promote education and health in developing countries through a partnership with Right to Play.

=== Not For Sale (2011) ===
- Raising awareness and lobbying the Canadian government to create tougher anti-human trafficking laws, and raised $36,000 towards this cause.

=== Live Love Lend (2012) ===
- $56,000 was raised for Kiva, a microfinancing website that empowers entrepreneurs in developing nations. This money was re-loaned multiple times to generate a total of $248,550 as of November 2014.

=== H2All (2013) ===
- Working with WaterCan, the Canadian Development Agency turned the initial amount of $50,000 into $125,000 to build four wells and sanitation projects in four Ethiopian communities.

=== Chain Reaction (2014) ===
- $180,000 was raised in partnership with World Bicycle Relief to buy bicycles for people in Africa and Asia. The bicycles allowed for increased access to education, medical care and entrepreneurial opportunities.

=== Treehouse Project (2015) ===
- In 2015, Strathcona High School started the Treehouse Project. The project aimed to end youth homelessness in the City of Edmonton and to build an ecolodge in Ecuador run by locals as a means of economic support.
- The School decided to do a 24-hour "Bikeathon", and set a goal of $200,000. The school exceeded its goal by raising over $352,000 with 1,100 students participating. Subsequently, the event made history as Canada's largest school charity project.

=== Bike2Box (2016) ===
- Shelter Box Canada was chosen as the charity to be supported in a school-wide vote of student and staff. Similar to 2015, a Bikeathon was the means of raising money. The 2016 fundraising goal of $200,000 was far surpassed as students raised just over $449,000. Approximately 1200 students participated. As a result, Bike2Box broke the record for the largest student-led fundraiser in Canada, while also maintaining their lead as Canada's largest school charity project.

=== Hope in Motion (2017) ===
- The Jack Davis Hope Foundation was selected as the charity to be supported in a school-wide vote of student and staff. The event was held from 10–11 March 2017.
- The school set a fundraising goal of $300,000 due to the success of the previous two events. The school ultimately raised just over $460,000. This brought the grand total raised by Strathcona's initiatives since 2008 to more than $1,934,000.

=== Break the Cycle (2018) ===
- Earth Group, in partnership with the World Food Programme, was selected as the charity to be supported in a school-wide vote of student and staff. The 2018 Bikeathon event was held on 16–17 March 2018.
- With the Break the Cycle campaign, Strathcona reached another milestone in its Global Initiatives, surpassing half-a-million dollars fundraised in a single initiative. The school raised $518,000 to feed over 1.6 million children in need across the world, including 100,000 meals for the Edmonton Food Bank. This pushed the total money fundraised by each campaign since 2008 well over the $2 million mark and totalling some $2,452,000.00.

=== Beyond Borders (2019) ===
- Doctors Without Borders, or Médecins Sans Frontières (MSF), was selected as the charity to be supported in the 2019 Bikeathon through a school-wide vote of students and staff. The 2019 Bikeathon event was held from 15–16 March 2019. In recognition of the fundraiser, the Mayor of Edmonton, Don Iveson, proclaimed 15 March, “Beyond Borders Day” in the City of Edmonton.
- The school set a fundraising goal of $350,000 due in part to the success of the previous events. The school far surpassed their goal, raising a total of $560,830. This pushed the total amount raised by each campaign since 2008 past the $3 Million mark, totalling $3,012,830.00.

=== One! Step Forward (2020) ===
- One! International Poverty Relief was chosen to be the 2020 Bikeathon supported charity through a school-wide student vote. Students and their teams raised $497,797.35 with the help of 3474 donors.
- The 2020 Bikeathon was cancelled on 11 March, two days before the opening ceremonies, due to the COVID-19 pandemic.

=== YESS: Youth Empowerment & Support Services (2023) ===
- Colloquially known as the 'Mission: Moonwalk' campaign, the students worked to raise over $158 000 for the Edmonton youth support organization YESS. This initiative marked the first after the hiatus imposed by the COVID-19 pandemic.
- Events offered to appease the students included dancing, painting, racing, and watching Star Wars: Episode III; Students largely did not sleep, highlighting their dedication to the cause.

=== Safe Exit (2024) ===
Zebra Child & Youth Advocacy Centre

=== Beyond The Books (2025) ===
Sombrilla

== Theatre productions ==
Strathcona High School has a well established theatre program. In addition to the major productions listed below, the students at the school, with direction from the staff, participate in and create various other theatre projects including: OneAct Festival (plays directed by Grade 12 Students using student cast and crew), smaller scale productions by the various Drama classes, pep rallies, and in conjunction with Students Union and other student bodies, a Talent show and an Awards night.

Strathcona's Schools Productions:

- 2005-2006 Little Shop of Horrors (musical)
- 2006-2007 Anything Goes
- 2007-2008 Footloose (musical)
- 2008-2009 Beauty and the Beast (musical)
- 2009-2010 West Side Story
- 2010-2011 Les Misérables
- 2011-2012 Legally Blonde
- 2012-2013 Anything Goes
- 2013-2014 In The Heights
- 2014-2015 The Addams Family (musical)
- 2015-2016 Rent
- 2016-2017 Bring it On
- 2017-2018 Footloose (musical)
- 2018-2019 Big Fish (musical)
- 2021-2022 Spring Awakening (musical)
- 2022-2023 Mean Girls (musical)
- 2023-2024 Head Over Heels (musical)
- 2024-2025 Hadestown: Teen Edition
- 2025-2026 Heathers: The Musical
- 2026-2027 Chicago: Teen Edition

Strathcona has also earned multiple Cappies awards including Outstanding musical for Footloose, West Side Story, Les Misérables, Legally Blonde, In the Heights and many other technical, dance, and acting awards.

Student Theater clubs: Dance Ensemble, Technical Theatre Crew, Improv Team, OneActs, AYTC

== Athletics ==
The school fields teams in:

- Badminton
- Basketball (boys and girls, both Junior and Senior)
- Cross Country
- Cricket
- Curling
- Football
- Golf (boys and girls)
- Hockey (Scona Classic)
- Rugby (boys and girls)
- Soccer (boys and girls, both Junior and Senior)
- Swimming
- Track and Field
- Ultimate
- Volleyball (boys and girls, both Junior and Senior)

Scona's athletics programs holds various winning streaks in Edmonton's city championships including:

- Track and Field - 53 years
- Swim Team – 39 years
- Canadian football – 6 years (and 2 provincial titles)
- Curling - 3 years

== Academics ==
16 Rhodes Scholars have come from Strathcona. Included in this number is the first female Rhodes scholar from Alberta. Scona also has an Advanced Placement (AP) program, which is one of the largest in Canada. By completing internationally recognized exams, administered by the College Board, many Strathcona students earn credit that can be applied to first year University courses. Currently, the school offers AP courses in Studio Art, Biology, Calculus AB, Calculus BC, Chemistry, Physics 1, Physics 2, Capstone Research, Statistics, Computer Science, English Language, English Literature, Spanish Language, European History, French Language, French Literature, and German Language.

For the 2014–2015 school year and registered enrolment for the 2015–2016 school year, Strathcona High School has the largest AP (Advanced Placement) program in Canada. AP grade averages ranked the highest in Canada, and second in North America.

In 2012, Strathcona High School was one of 10 schools worldwide to participate in the pilot program of the AP Capstone program. The program became fully operational for the 2014–15 school year, with 100 of the more than 20,000 AP schools participating. Strathcona was the only school in Alberta, and one of only 15 in Canada, to participate in the program in its first years. As of the 2017–2018 school year, there are 27 Canadian schools participating in the Capstone program. Strathcona, W.P. Wagner High School, and Queen Elizabeth High School, all in Edmonton, were the only Alberta schools participating.

== Notable alumni and staff ==
=== Notable former students ===
- Mac DeMarco, musician
- Monique Ganderton, stunt woman and actress
- Lisa Gilroy, comedian and actress
- Jon Hameister-Ries, CFL professional football player
- Lois Hole, Lieutenant Governor of Alberta
- Don Iveson, Mayor of Edmonton
- Maria Klawe, president of Harvey Mudd College, board of directors at Microsoft
- J. R. LaRose, CFL player
- Bruce McCulloch, comedian
- Dianna Proctor, sprinter
- Megan Metcalfe, Canadian Olympian, long-distance runner
- Kevin Park, World Curling Tour professional
- Callum Keith Rennie, actor
- Corbin Sharun, CFL player
- Catherine Mary Stewart, actress
- Dimitri Tsoumpas, CFL player

=== Notable staff ===
Principal Ross Sheppard was an athlete, and became superintendent of the Edmonton Public School Board. Principal Harry Ainlay was a long-time member of Edmonton City Council, including three consecutive terms as Mayor of Edmonton. Both of them have high schools named for them in the city.
