= Dwight Anderson (gridiron football) =

Jamaican gridiron football player (born 1981)

No. 33
- Position: Defensive back

Personal information
- Born: August 5, 1981 (age 45); Spanish Town, Jamaica
- Listed height: 5 ft 11 in (1.80 m)
- Listed weight: 228 lb (103 kg)

Career information
- High school: Bloomfield (Bloomfield, Connecticut)
- College: South Dakota

Career history
- 2004: St. Louis Rams
- 2005: Carolina Panthers*
- 2005: St. Louis Rams
- 2007: Philadelphia Soul*
- 2007: Hamilton Tiger-Cats
- 2008–2010: Calgary Stampeders
- 2011–2012: Montreal Alouettes
- 2013–2014: Saskatchewan Roughriders
- 2014: Toronto Argonauts
- * Offseason or practice squad member only

Awards and highlights
- 2× Grey Cup champion (2008, 2013); CFL All-Star (2010); 4× CFL West All-Star (2009, 2010, 2012, 2013)
- Stats at Pro Football Reference
- Stats at CFL.ca (archive)

Dwight Anderson (born July 5, 1981) is a Jamaican-born former professional gridiron football defensive back who played in the National Football League (NFL) and Canadian Football League (CFL). He was signed by the St. Louis Rams as an undrafted free agent in 2004.

Anderson was also a member of the NFL Carolina Panthers, the AFL team the Philadelphia Soul, before becoming a journeyman across several CFL teams: the Hamilton Tiger-Cats, Calgary Stampeders, Montreal Alouettes, Saskatchewan Roughriders and Toronto Argonauts.

== Early life ==
Anderson grew up in the borough known as Queens in New York City. In high school, Anderson starred on the football field for Bloomfield High School in Bloomfield, Connecticut. There he earned All-State football honors from the New Haven Register in 1999. He played college football at South Dakota.

== Career ==
Anderson signed as a backup with the St. Louis Rams in 2004, making 16 tackles over the course of 12 active games. After stints on the Rams' and Panthers' practice squads, as well as the same for the 2007 Philadelphia Soul, Anderson was traded mid-season to Hamilton Tiger-Cats for the remainder of their season. After being injured, he would remain on the bench as the team fell to a 3-15 record.

He would finally find consisting starting duties with the Calgary Stampeders, helping them to the playoffs for three seasons consecutively and win the Grey Cup in 2008, while winning All-CFL Team honors in 2010 for himself. After a two-year term with the Montreal Alouettes that included two further playoff appearances, he was traded to the Saskatchewan Roughriders and would help to a Grey cup win in 2013. After another successful season with the Roughriders (marking seven consecutive playoff seasons) and a season with the Toronto Argonauts, he retired in 2014.
