= Hugh Campbell Distinguished Leadership Award =

The Hugh Campbell Distinguished Leadership Award was first awarded in 2006. It is awarded to an individual who has demonstrated great leadership and made significant contributions to the Canadian Football League. This award has not been given out each year since it was created. It is awarded to honour Hugh Campbell's years of service to Canadian football as a player, coach, and executive.

== Award winners ==
- 2006 – Hugh Campbell, Edmonton Eskimos
- 2007 – Bob Ackles – British Columbia Lions
- 2008 – not awarded
- 2009 – Stan Schwartz, Calgary Stampeders
- 2010 – Tony Proudfoot – Montreal Alouettes
- 2011 – Rick LeLacheur
- 2012 – Brian Williams – CBC and TSN broadcaster
- 2013 – not awarded
- 2014 – Jim Hopson – Saskatchewan Roughriders
- 2015 – Bob Irving – voice of Winnipeg Blue Bombers
- 2016 – Norman Kwong – first Asian born CFL player with Calgary & Edmonton winning 4 Grey Cups
- 2017 – Paul Graham – Vice-president and executive producer of The Sports Network
- 2018 – Wally Buono – Head Coach and General Manager of Calgary Stampeders (1990–2002) and BC Lions (2003–2018)
- 2019 – John Hufnagel – Calgary Stampeders
- 2020 – season cancelled due to the COVID-19 pandemic in Canada
- 2021 – Dr. Bob McCormack & Dr. Dhiren Naidu — the CFL's Chief Medical Officers
- 2022 – Rick LeLacheur, President of the BC Lions
- 2023 – George Hopkins, Calgary Stampeders equipment manager
- 2024 – Stephen Shamie
- 2025 – not awarded
- 2026 – Ron Foxcroft
