= Rick LeLacheur =

Edmonton Elks
- Title: President and CEO

Personal information
- Born: 25 August 1948 (age 78); Edmonton, Alberta, Canada
- Listed height: 5 ft 10 in (1.78 m)
- Listed weight: 185 lb (84 kg)

Career history
- Edmonton Eskimos (2002–2011); President, CEO, COO; BC Lions (2018–2022); President and CEO; Edmonton Elks (2023–2024); President and CEO

Awards and highlights
- As an executive: 2× Grey Cup champion (2003, 2005); 2× Hugh Campbell Distinguished Leadership Award (2011, 2022)
Ice hockey career
- Position: Right wing
- Played for: Edmonton Western Movers; Edmonton Oil Kings; Edmonton Monarchs

Rick LeLacheur (born 25 August 1948) is a Canadian football executive and former ice hockey player who is the former president and chief executive officer (CEO) for the Edmonton Elks and BC Lions of the Canadian Football League (CFL).

== Early life and hockey career ==
An Edmonton native, LeLacheur was born on 25 August 1948. Playing at the right wing position, he was on the roster for the Edmonton Western Movers of the Alberta Junior Hockey League (AJHL) for the 1966–67 season. LeLacheur then played two seasons for the Edmonton Oil Kings of the Western Canada Junior Hockey League (WCJHL), later renamed the Western Canada Hockey League (WCHL). He was the captain for the Oil Kings. LeLacheur's final season playing ice hockey was for the Edmonton Monarchs of the Alberta Senior Hockey League (ASHL) in 1969–70.

== Executive career ==
Following his hockey career, LeLacheur pursued a business career path, working for his family's Western Moving and Storage business for 25 years. He became Western's president in 1982, serving in the position until the company was sold in 1992.

In 1984, before becoming involved with any Canadian Football League (CFL) team, he was the chairman of the Grey Cup festival. He was a board member of the CFL's Edmonton Eskimos in the 1980s. From 1992 to 1998, LeLacheur served as the head of Economic Development Edmonton (EDE), also known as the Edmonton Economic Development Corporation (EEDC). In 1994, LeLacheur brokered a deal that gave Peter Pocklington full control over the Northlands Coliseum.

LeLacheur became the president and CEO of the 2001 World Championships in Athletics, hosted in Edmonton.

LeLacheur then served as the team president and CEO of the Eskimos from 2002 to 2011. He began his tenure with the team as the chief operating officer (COO) of the franchise. Edmonton hosted the 90th Grey Cup in 2002, with LeLacheur serving as the game's managing director. During his tenure with the Eskimos, he oversaw new building additions to the team's Commonwealth Stadium. LeLacheur won two Grey Cup championships with the Eskimos, in 2003 and 2005. In 2010, he publicly criticized the team as they started the season 0–4. Edmonton would again host Grey Cup festivities in 2010. LeLacheur was named the winner of the Hugh Campbell Distinguished Leadership Award for the 2011 CFL season. He left the team due to health concerns, after experiencing complications stemming from surgery for prostate cancer.

In December 2011, he was appointed as the chairman for a three-year term for Horce Racing Alberta (HRA), a private, not-for-profit organization. In December 2017, LeLacheur was named the president and CEO of the CFL's BC Lions. At the time, he was still serving as HRA's chairman of the board. His tenure with the Lions began in January 2018 and ended following the 2022 season. During his tenure with the team, he was tasked with finding new ownership. He was named the Hugh Campbell Distinguished Leadership Award winner for a second time for the 2022 CFL season.

Though he retired following his Lions tenure, he was lured out of retirement and named the interim president and CEO of the Edmonton Elks on August 22, 2023. This marked his second tenure in those positions with the franchise. During this second tenure, the Elks reviewed their ownership structure; the team has been notably community-owned since 1949, though the Elks have been discussed in Canadian football media as potentially moving toward private ownership. LeLacheur mentioned the team's financial struggles over the few previous seasons as a factor that "can't be overlooked". His role with the Elks ended on October 31, 2024, when Chris Morris was named to the role.

== Ice hockey career statistics ==
			Regular season					Playoffs
Season	Team	League	GP	G	A	Pts	PIM	GP	G	A	Pts	PIM
1966–67	Edmonton Western Movers	AJHL	Statistics unavailable					—	—	—	—	—
1967–68	Edmonton Oil Kings	WCJHL	50	18	19	37	33	—	—	—	—	—
1968–69	Edmonton Oil Kings	WCHL	52	9	17	26	58	—	—	—	—	—
1969–70	Edmonton Monarchs	ASHL	Statistics unavailable					—	—	—	—	—
