= Jamall Johnson =

American gridiron football player (born 1982)

No. 28
- Position: Linebacker

Personal information
- Born: October 12, 1982 (age 44); Norco, Louisiana, U.S.
- Listed height: 6 ft 1 in (1.85 m)
- Listed weight: 222 lb (101 kg)

Career information
- High school: Destrehan (LA)
- College: Northwestern State

Career history
- 2005: Cleveland Browns*
- 2005–2008: BC Lions
- 2009: Tampa Bay Buccaneers*
- 2009–2013: Hamilton Tiger-Cats
- 2014: BC Lions
- * Offseason or practice squad member only

Awards and highlights
- Grey Cup champion (2006); CFL All-Star (2009); 2× CFL East All-Star (2009, 2011); Southland Newcomer of the Year (2003); 2× Division I FCS All-American (2003–2004); 2× First-team All-Southland (2003–2004)
- Stats at CFL.ca (archive)

Jamall Johnson (born October 12, 1982) is an American actor and former professional football player. He played as a linebacker in the Canadian Football League (CFL). Johnson was signed by the Cleveland Browns of the National Football League (NFL) as an undrafted free agent in 2005 and was also a member of the Hamilton Tiger-Cats, Tampa Bay Buccaneers, and BC Lions. He played college football for the Northwestern State Demons and high school football at Destrehan High School.

Since leaving football he has become an actor in Vancouver, BC. He is known for Robin Roberts Presents: Mahalia (2021), Wendy Williams: The Movie and Chateau Christmas (2020).

== College career ==
He went to Delta State University and Northwestern State University, where he earned a degree in Business Administration. He played college football and continued his career with the CFL.

== Professional career ==
=== Cleveland Browns ===
Johnson was signed as an undrafted free agent by the Browns in 2005 but was waived before training camp.

=== BC Lions ===
Johnson was signed as a free agent by the BC Lions in 2005. In 2005, he played 5 games, had 7 total tackles and made a key forced fumble in the 2005 West Division Final versus the Edmonton Eskimos. In 2006, Johnson recorded 12 total tackles and a 39-yard fumble recovery. He played during BC's victory in the 2006 Grey Cup.

=== Tampa Bay Buccaneers ===
Johnson was signed to a future contract by the Tampa Bay Buccaneers on December 31, 2008. He was released on June 19, 2009.

=== Hamilton Tiger-Cats ===
Johnson signed with the Hamilton Tiger-Cats on July 4, 2009.

=== BC Lions ===
Johnson was signed as a free agent by the BC Lions on February 13, 2014.
