= Kevin Huntley (gridiron football) =

American football player (born 1982)

No. 94, 98
- Position: Defensive tackle

Personal information
- Born: April 8, 1982 (age 44); Washington, D.C., U.S.
- Listed height: 6 ft 7 in (2.01 m)
- Listed weight: 305 lb (138 kg)

Career information
- High school: Archbishop Carroll (Washington, D.C.)
- College: Kansas State
- NFL draft: 2005: undrafted

Career history
- Oakland Raiders (2005–2006); Atlanta Falcons (2007); Washington Redskins (2008)*; Pittsburgh Steelers (2008)*; Toronto Argonauts (2009–2013); Calgary Stampeders (2013–2014)
- * Offseason or practice squad member only

Awards and highlights
- Grey Cup champion (2012)

Career NFL statistics
- Total tackles: 13
- Sacks: 2.5
- Fumble recoveries: 1
- Stats at Pro Football Reference

Kevin L. Huntley (born April 8, 1982) is a former professional American and Canadian football defensive tackle. He was signed by the Oakland Raiders as an undrafted free agent in 2005. He played college football for the Kansas State Wildcats.

Huntley was also a member of the Atlanta Falcons, Washington Redskins, Pittsburgh Steelers, Toronto Argonauts and Calgary Stampeders.

== Professional career ==
=== Oakland Raiders ===
Huntley was signed as an undrafted free agent by the Oakland Raiders in 2005. He was released by the Raiders on August 29, 2007.

=== Atlanta Falcons ===
On September 12, 2007, he signed with the Atlanta Falcons but was released October 9. On October 29, 2007, he was signed back to the Falcons practice squad.

=== Washington Redskins ===
He signed with the Washington Redskins during the 2008 offseason but was released before playing in any games.

=== Pittsburgh Steelers ===
On August 12, 2008, he was claimed off waivers by the Pittsburgh Steelers, but was released on August 16.

=== Toronto Argonauts ===
Huntley was signed by the Toronto Argonauts on April 27, 2009 and was cut at the end of training camp. He was re-signed on July 10, 2009. He tallied 5 tackles and 1 sack in his debut on July 11, 2009. On June 22, 2013 Huntley was released by the Argos. Huntley played 4 seasons with the Argos, amassing 123 tackles and 26 sacks.

=== Calgary Stampeders ===
Huntley was signed by the Calgary Stampeders on June 25, 2013.
