= Titus Ryan =

American gridiron football player (born 1984)

No. 87
- Position: Wide receiver

Personal information
- Born: May 19, 1984 (age 42); Tuscaloosa, Alabama
- Listed height: 6 ft 0 in (1.83 m)
- Listed weight: 200 lb (91 kg)

Career information
- High school: Northport (AL) Tuscaloosa Co.
- College: Concordia (AL)
- NFL draft: 2007: undrafted

Career history
- Kansas City Chiefs (2007)*; New Orleans Saints (2007–2008)*; Carolina Panthers (2008)*; Calgary Stampeders (2009); Winnipeg Blue Bombers (2009); Dallas Cowboys (2010–2011)*; Las Vegas Locos (2012); New York Jets (2012–2013)*
- * Offseason or practice squad member only

Awards and highlights
- NJCAA All-American (2003)
- Stats at Pro Football Reference

Titus LeMoyne Ryan (born May 19, 1984) is a former professional American and Canadian football wide receiver. He was signed by the Kansas City Chiefs as an undrafted free agent in 2007. He played college football at Concordia College, Selma.

Ryan was also a member of the New Orleans Saints, Carolina Panthers, Calgary Stampeders, Winnipeg Blue Bombers, Las Vegas Locos, Dallas Cowboys, and New York Jets.

== Professional career ==
=== New York Jets ===
Ryan was signed to the New York Jets' practice squad on December 10, 2012. He was released on December 29, 2012. He signed a reserve/future contract on December 31, 2012. Ryan was released on August 22, 2013.
