= Fred Reid =

American gridiron football player and coach (born 1982)

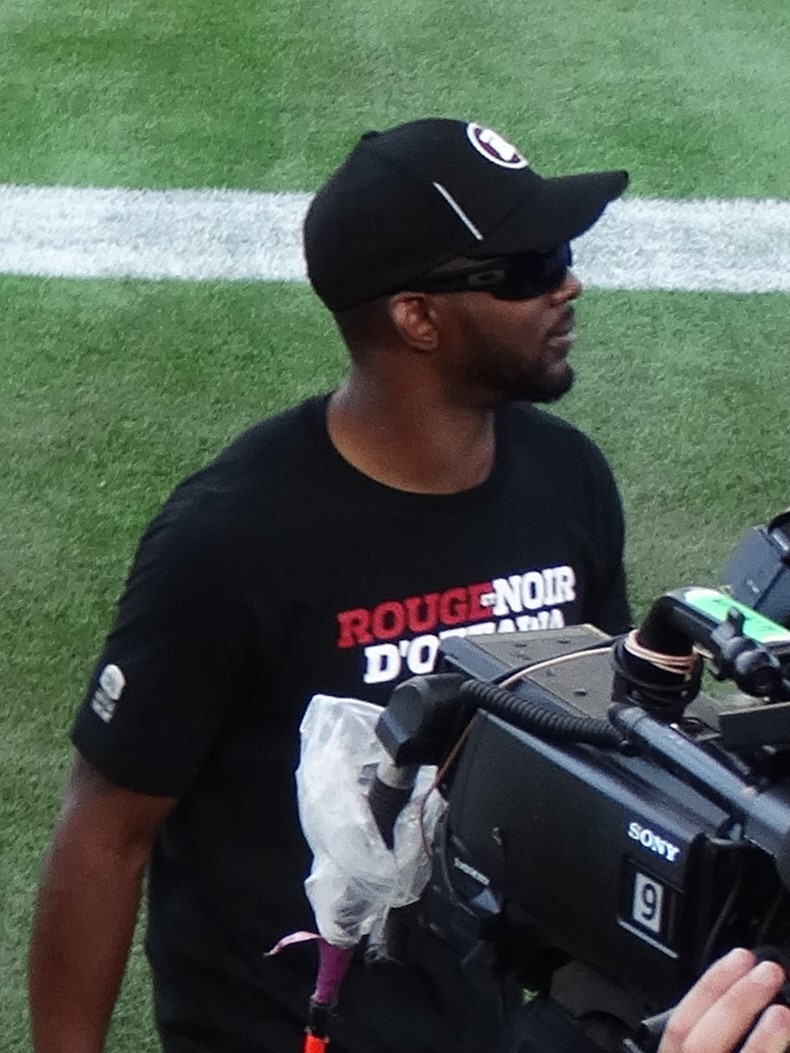
- Reid with the Redblacks in 2022

Ottawa Redblacks
- Title: Running backs coach

Personal information
- Born: March 16, 1982 (age 44); Tampa, Florida, U.S.
- Listed height: 5 ft 10 in (1.78 m)
- Listed weight: 185 lb (84 kg)

Career information
- Position: Running back
- College: Mississippi State

Career history

Playing
- 2005: Tampa Bay Buccaneers*
- 2007: Mississippi MudCats
- 2007–2011: Winnipeg Blue Bombers
- * Offseason or practice squad member only

Coaching
- 2014–2018: Middleton High School (Head coach)
- 2020–2021: Toronto Argonauts (Running backs coach)
- 2022–present: Ottawa Redblacks (Running backs coach)

Awards and highlights
- CFL All-Star (2010); 3× CFL East All-Star (2008–2010)
- Stats at CFL.ca (archive)

Fred Reid (born March 16, 1982) is the running backs coach for the Ottawa Redblacks of the Canadian Football League (CFL). He is a former professional gridiron football running back who played primarily for the Winnipeg Blue Bombers. He was originally signed by the Tampa Bay Buccaneers as an undrafted free agent in 2005. He played college football at Mississippi State.

== College career ==
Reid attended Mississippi State University and in four years of college football he totaled 996 rushing yards on 236 rushing attempts with six touchdowns. He also totaled 44 receptions, 349 receiving yards and two touchdowns. When he graduated he finished as the Southeastern Conference's (SEC) all-time leading kick returner. As a kick returner with the Bulldogs, Reid had 61 returns for 1,303 yards.

As a senior in 2004, Reid helped Sylvester Croom, the first African American head coach in the SEC, win his debut by rushing for 37 yards on 15 carries and one touchdown. During his final season which is considered his best at Mississippi State, Reid had 82 rushes, 393 yards and two touchdowns. Against Maine, he had a career-high 18 rushes for 72 rushing yards.

== Professional career ==
=== Tampa Bay Buccaneers ===
Coming out of Mississippi State, Reid went undrafted in the 2005 NFL draft and was signed by the Tampa Bay Buccaneers shortly after the draft. He was released by the Buccaneers on June 28, 2005.

=== Mississippi MudCats ===
In the spring of 2007, Reid played for the Mississippi MudCats of the American Indoor Football Association.

=== Winnipeg Blue Bombers ===
After spending 2006 out of football, upon recommendation from Winnipeg Blue Bombers linebacker Barrin Simpson, Reid was signed by Winnipeg on April 5, 2007. In his first year with the Blue Bombers he played in all 18 regular-season games and rushed for 270 yards on 40 attempts with two touchdowns. Reid got two starts when Charles Roberts was out with injury. In those two starts, Reid ran for 196 yards and two touchdowns. As a kickoff returner, he had 213 yards on nine attempts. He saw playing time in all three of Winnipeg's playoff games including the Grey Cup against Saskatchewan.

In his second year in Winnipeg, Reid totaled 709 yards on 101 rushing attempts and added three touchdowns. He was named an all-star after the season.

After the 2008 season, Reid's contract expired and he became a free agent, however he was re-signed on January 30, 2009. He was expected to share time at running back with Joe Smith in 2009. However, after Lavarus Giles impressed Blue Bombers management, Smith was released, meaning Reid would end up sharing carries with Giles.

On August 21, 2009, Reid set a new Blue Bombers record for rushing in a single game with 260 yards, with the previous record being 249. Reid led the league in rushing during the 2010 CFL season with 1,396 yards. After spending five seasons with the Blue Bombers, he was released on February 27, 2012.

== CFL statistics ==
Rushing		Regular season						Receiving
Year	Team	No.	Yards	Avg	Long	TD	Fumb	No.	Yards	Avg	Long	TD
2007	WPG	40	270	6.8	0	2	0	8	120	15.0	41	0
2008	WPG	101	709	7.0	0	3	0	13	96	7.4	22	0
2009	WPG	238	1,371	5.8	52	7	2	21	157	7.5	24	1
2010	WPG	213	1,396	6.6	61	6	3	35	255	7.3	18	0
2011	WPG	181	759	4.2	47	4	1	22	182	8.3	44	0
Totals		773	4505	5.8	61	22	6	99	810	8.2	44	1

== Coaching career ==
=== Toronto Argonauts ===
On February 6, 2020, it was announced that Reid had joined the Toronto Argonauts as the team's running backs coach. While the 2020 CFL season was cancelled, Reid continued as a coach for the Argonauts in 2021. He was not retained by the Argonauts following the season.

=== Ottawa Redblacks ===
On March 11, 2022, it was announced that Reid had joined the Ottawa Redblacks as the team's running backs coach. The move reunited him with his former Winnipeg head coach, Paul LaPolice.
