= Yonus Davis =

American gridiron football player (born 1984)

Profile
- Positions: Running back, Kick returner

Personal information
- Born: July 21, 1984 (age 42); Oakland, California, U.S.
- Listed height: 5 ft 7 in (1.70 m)
- Listed weight: 185 lb (84 kg)

Career information
- High school: Skyline (Oakland, California)
- College: San Jose State

Career history
- 2010: BC Lions

Awards and highlights
- Second-team All-WAC (2005, 2006); John Agro Special Teams Award runner up - 2010

Yonus Ramon Davis (born July 21, 1984) is an American former football running back and kick returner. A native of Oakland, California, he played college football in San Jose State University and signed as a free agent to the BC Lions in 2010. The Lions cut Davis in 2011 after Davis was arrested in California for attempting to sell ecstasy, and Davis served 13 months in U.S. federal prison from 2013 to 2014.

== High school and college ==
Born in Oakland, California, Davis attended Skyline High School. His first name "Yonus" means "Greek King". In 2002, the San Francisco Chronicle selected Davis as "Player of the Year" for Alameda County. Cal-Hi Sports named Davis a second-team all-state selection. During his junior season, Davis returned four punts and two kickoffs for two touchdowns. As a senior, Davis rushed for 1,208 yards and 16 touchdowns, intercepted four passes, and returned two punts and two kickoffs.

At San Jose State University, Davis played for the San Jose State Spartans from 2003 to 2008 and redshirted the 2004 season after playing two games. Rushing 1,007 yards on 163 carries in 2006, Davis became the first Spartan since 2000 to rush more than 1,000 yards in one season. He also became the first Spartan running back to average more than 6.0 yards per carry in consecutive seasons. In 2008, Davis played as a fifth-year senior due to a hardship exemption. Davis played 10 games in 2008 with 558 rushing yards and 3 touchdowns. In December 2008, Davis graduated from San Jose State with a B.A. in sociology with an emphasis in criminology.

== CFL career ==
After taking the 2009 season off, Davis signed as a free agent with the BC Lions on January 20, 2010. Wearing jersey #32, Davis debuted with the Lions on July 30 in a game against the Edmonton Eskimos with an 88-yard kickoff return for a touchdown. In a 37–13 loss on August 12 to the Saskatchewan Roughriders, Davis scored the only touchdown for BC on a 51-yard rush, had 84 rushing yards on three carries overall, and returned five kickoffs for 133 yards. Because of this, Mike Beamish of The Vancouver Sun wrote that Davis "could be the Lions' most exciting runner/returner since Stefan Logan." On September 25, Davis returned punts for 244 yards in a 29–10 victory over the Calgary Stampeders, and the CFL named Davis special teams player of the week. Over three games in August, Davis tallied 497 total return yards and was named special teams player of the month for August 2010.

Davis had another 88-yard touchdown from a punt return in the October 31 game against the Saskatchewan Roughriders.

Yonus Davis played in 14 games with 2 starts during the 2010 CFL season for the BC Lions. He finished the year with 1,897 all-purpose yards and 7 touchdowns.

== Drug arrest and conviction ==
On April 9, 2011, Davis was arrested in California after 27 kilograms (59.5 lbs) of ecstasy was delivered to a home he was renting. He was charged with one felony count of attempting to possess a controlled substance with intent to distribute. Davis served one and a half years of his sentence and was then released on good behavior.

On May 3, 2011, the Lions announced they had terminated Davis' contract as a result of the charges. "We are not passing judgment on anybody," Lions General Manager Wally Buono told a news conference at the team's training facility. "But obviously the association and the implication is not something we as an organization, as a league, that we want to be involved with. We are severing ties for that reason."

On February 2, 2012, Yonus Davis pleaded guilty in U.S. Federal District Court (docket 11-CR-00237-DLJ) in San Jose, California to a charge of importing ecstasy in violation of Title 21, United States Code, Sections 952, 960(a)(1), and 960(b)(3), as well as aiding and abetting others in that crime.

Federal judge D. Lowell Jensen sentenced Davis to 33 months in prison on February 7, 2013, with incentive of drug program. Davis was paroled from the Federal Correctional Institution, Terminal Island on March 19, 2014, and his parole ended on September 19, 2014.
