= 96th Grey Cup =

2008 Canadian Football championship game

Calgary Stampeders	Montreal Alouettes
(13–5)	(11–7)
22	14
Head coach: John Hufnagel	Head coach: Marc Trestman
	1	2	3	4	Total
Calgary Stampeders	0	10	6	6	22
Montreal Alouettes	3	10	1	0	14
- Date: November 23, 2008
- Stadium: Olympic Stadium
- Location: Montreal
- Most Valuable Player: Henry Burris, QB (Stampeders)
- Most Valuable Canadian: Sandro DeAngelis, K (Stampeders)
- National anthem: Nikki Yanofsky with Royal 22^{e} Régiment Band
- Coin toss: General Walt Natynczyk, Chief of the Defence Staff
- Referee: Jake Ireland
- Halftime show: Theory of a Deadman, Suzie McNeil, and Andrée Watters
- Attendance: 66,308

Broadcasters
- Network: English:TSN/TSN HD, Versus (U.S. station); French:RDS/RDS HD
- Announcers: (TSN): Chris Cuthbert, Glen Suitor, Dave Randorf, Jock Climie, Matt Dunigan, Chris Schultz (RDS): Denis Casavant, Pierre Vercheval, David Arsenault, Mike Sutherland
- Ratings: 3,654,000 in Canada

The 96th Grey Cup was held in Montreal, Quebec at Olympic Stadium on November 23, 2008. The East Division champion Montreal Alouettes hosted the West Division champion Calgary Stampeders. The Stampeders won the game 22–14, with quarterback Henry Burris winning the MVP award. It was the first time Montreal had hosted the Grey Cup since 2001, the first time since the 2002 Grey Cup that the host city played for the Grey Cup, and the first time since the 58th Grey Cup in 1970 that the Alouettes and Stampeders had met for the national championship. Hoping to break the record for highest attendance for a Grey Cup game, the organizers expanded Olympic Stadium to almost 70,000 seats. A crowd of 66,308 attended the game, failing to break the record of 68,318 set in 1977, but good enough to be the second-highest attended Grey Cup game of all time. Montreal has now played host to the four highest-attended Grey Cup games in history. It was the last time a Western-based team has won the Grey Cup in Eastern Canada until the Winnipeg Blue Bombers won the 108th Grey Cup against the Hamilton Tiger-Cats at Tim Hortons Field in Hamilton in 2021.

== Broadcast ==
This was the first Grey Cup not to be broadcast on CBC Television since they started broadcasting the Grey Cup in 1952. In Canada, the game was telecast solely on the cable channel TSN and its French-language sister network RDS. Internationally, both Versus, telecasting in the United States, and Canadian Forces Radio and Television, broadcasting to Canadian forces internationally, used the TSN feed and graphics.

The game was available in HD on both TSN HD and RDS HD and shown in HD in the United States on Voom HD Networks's WorldSport. It was also seen online at ESPN360.com.

== Events ==
Much like in 2001, there was a Grey Cup Village at the Dorchester Square. Musical events included Porn Flakes, Kellylee Evans, Rock Story, Véronique Labbé, Guy Bélanger, Take the Boys, White Faze, Marc Parent et Wang Dang Doodle, Angel Forrest, Young Soul, and Sylvie Desgroseilliers (Motown Show). There also was the annual Montreal Christmas Santa Claus Parade on Saturday November 22/2, 008.

The Montreal Canadiens' decision to retire the jersey of Patrick Roy the same weekend caused controversy, as some felt that the hockey team — the city's dominant sports franchise — was trying to take attention away from the Montreal Alouettes and the CFL during their championship game weekend.

== Attendance ==
The organizers of the 96th Grey Cup hoped to break the 70,000 attendance mark. The current record for highest attendance was set at the 1977 Grey Cup, also at the Big O in Montreal (68,318). The attendance was reported at 66,308 during the TSN broadcast of the game. In so doing, the 2008 game displaced the 2001 Grey Cup, for second-best attendance (65,255 in 2001, also played in Montreal).

Tickets were priced from $84 in the balcony to $274 in the platinum section. Tickets had three pre-sale days, one during the 95th Grey Cup, one in December and one during Super Bowl XLII. Regular tickets went on sale in March 2008.

== Game summary ==
Calgary Stampeders (22) - TDs, Brett Ralph; FGs Sandro DeAngelis (5); cons., DeAngelis (1).

Montreal Alouettes (14) - TDs, Avon Cobourne; FGs Damon Duval (2); single Duval (1); cons., Duval (1).

First Quarter
MTL – FG Duval 14-yard field goal (4:34)
Second Quarter
CGY – FG DeAngelis 44-yard field goal (1:12)
MTL – TD Cobourne 16-yard run (7:18) (Duval convert)
MTL – FG Duval 19-yard field goal (12:08)
CGY – TD Ralph 20-yard pass from Burris (14:16) (DeAngelis convert)
Third Quarter
CGY – FG DeAngelis 12-yard field goal (8:22)
MTL – Single Duval 63-yard kick went out-of-bounds 9 yards deep in end zone (11:13)
CGY – FG DeAngelis 21-yard field goal (15:00)
Fourth Quarter
CGY – FG DeAngelis 30-yard field goal (2:46)
CGY – FG DeAngelis 50-yard field goal (10:48)

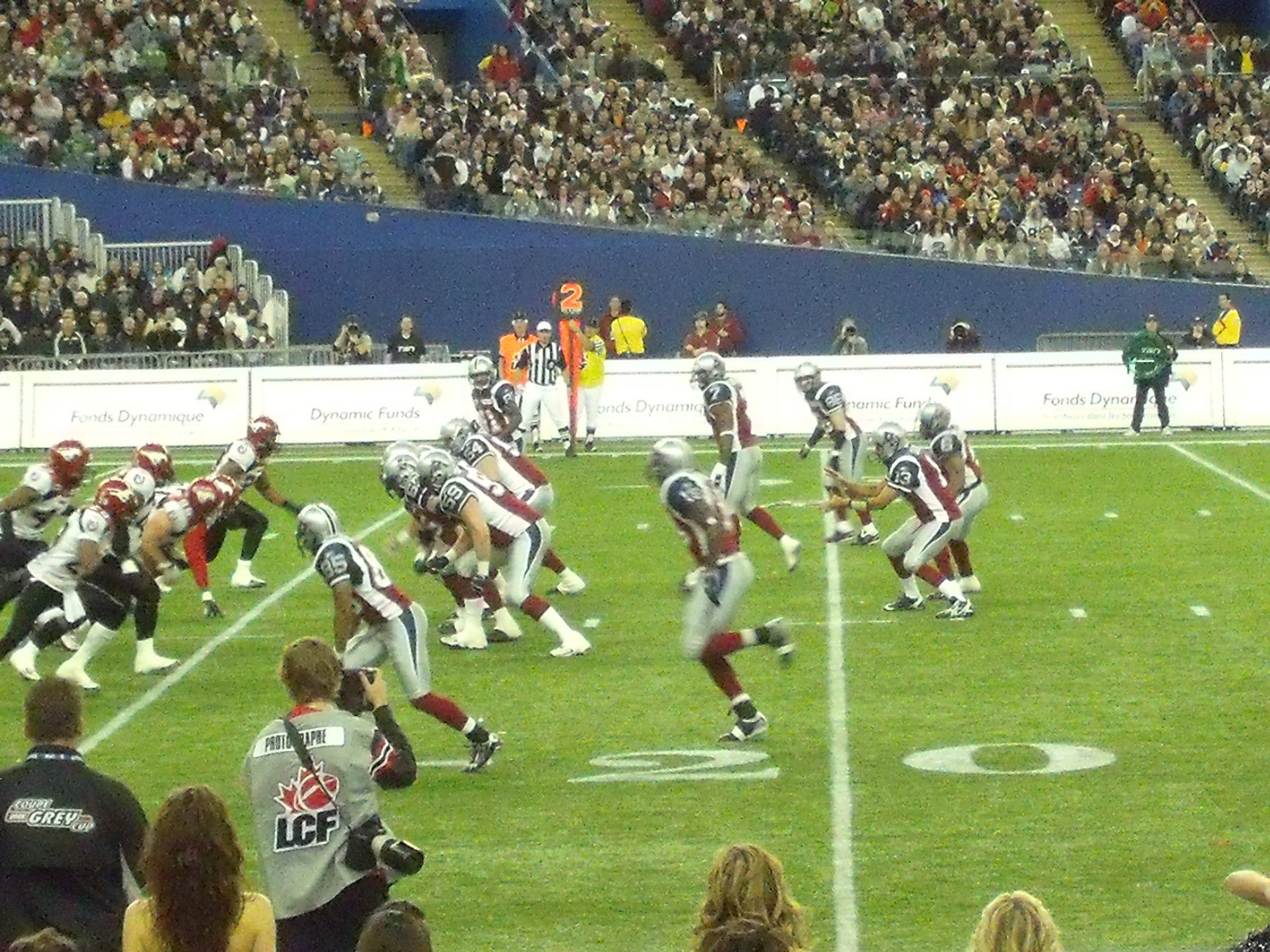
Montreal Alouettes on offence in the 96th Grey Cup.

Calgary quarterback, Henry Burris threw for 328 yards and one touchdown, leading all rushers with 79 yards, while kicker Sandro DeAngelis kicked five field goals as the Calgary Stampeders rallied for a 22–14 victory over the Montreal Alouettes to win the Grey Cup, in front of the 66,305 Montreal faithful at Olympic Stadium.

For his efforts, Henry Burris was named the game's Grey Cup's Most Valuable Player, while kicker Sandro DeAngelis kicked five field goals, connecting from 44, 12, 21, 30 and 50 yards out and took home the Grey Cup's Most Valuable Canadian honours.

The game got off to a slow start with a Damon Duval 14 yard chip shot field goal for Montreal representing all the scoring in the first quarter. The drive was highlighted by a 55-yard completion from Alouettes' quarterback Anthony Calvillo to Jamel Richardson. Sandro DeAngelis answered back in the second quarter with a 44-yard field goal to put the Calgary Stampeders back on even terms at 3-3.

However, the Montreal Alouettes responded when Montreal linebacker, Reggie Hunt intercepted a Henry Burris pass, giving the Alouettes the ball near midfield. The Alouettes offence drove the ball deep into Calgary territory before running back, Avon Cobourne scored the game's first touchdown in the second quarter on a 16-yard run. Then, special teams standout Larry Taylor gave the Alouettes great field position again with a 42-yard punt return. Duval again stepped in and made good on his 19-yard attempt to extend the Montreal lead to 13–3.

With momentum on the home team's side, the Calgary Stampeders responded late in the first half when Henry Burris threw a 20-yard touchdown pass to wide receiver Brett Ralph, cutting the Montreal lead to 13-10 heading into halftime and taking momentum away from Montreal.

In the second half of the game, it was all Calgary Stampeders. In the third quarter, Sandro DeAngelis kicked his second field goal of the game to tie the game 13-13. Montreal took a 14–13 lead after Damon Duval added a punt single, but that was all the offence that Montreal was able to muster in the second half of the game.

On Calgary's next possession, Henry Burris put together a 75-yard drive, including runs of 14 and 29 yards for first downs, which led to a short field goal kick from DeAngelis to give Calgary a 16–14 lead. fry t Montreal's offence started to threaten, but the Calgary defence responded. On the first play of the fourth quarter, Anthony Calvillo was intercepted by Calgary's Dwight Anderson that led to another field goal by DeAngelis to give the Stampeders a 19–14 advantage. Then midway through the game, the Alouettes threatened to regain the lead before an errant Calvillo pass was intercepted by Shannon James, which quieted the Olympic Stadium crowd. Sandro DeAngelis then kicked a 50-yard field goal to extend the Calgary lead to eight points and seal their victory, becoming Grey Cup champions for the first time since 2001.

Stampeders wide receiver, Nikolas Lewis chipped in with 11 catches for 122 yards for the Calgary offence, while Montreal's Jamel Richardson led all receivers with 123 yards and Ben Cahoon was able to catch for 95 yards through the air. However, Anthony Calvillo, who edged out Henry Burris to become the regular season's Most Outstanding Player threw for no touchdowns, got intercepted twice and dropped to a 1–5 record in his Grey Cup appearances.

=== Notable game facts ===
Referee Jake Ireland officiated in his 15th Grey Cup game. This also marked his final game as an official after calling 555 games in his 30-year CFL career.

== 2008 CFL playoffs ==
=== Division Semi-finals ===
==== East Semi-Final ====
Date and time: Saturday, November 8, 12:00 PM Central Standard Time
Venue: Canad Inns Stadium, Winnipeg, Manitoba

Team	Q1	Q2	Q3	Q4	Total
Edmonton Eskimos	3	18	8	0	29
Winnipeg Blue Bombers	8	7	0	6	21

The Edmonton Eskimos claimed the victory on a cold, windy afternoon at Canad Inns Stadium before 27,493 spectators by defeating the Winnipeg Blue Bombers, 29–21 to become the first West Division team to earn a playoff win as a crossover squad since the CFL adopted the concept in 1997.

In the first quarter, Winnipeg took an early 8–0 lead when quarterback Kevin Glenn threw a 78-yard touchdown pass to Romby Bryant, while kicker Alexis Serna earned one point on a missed 23-yard field goal attempt. Before the end of the first quarter, Noel Prefontaine kicked a 23-yard field goal to make it 8-3 Blue Bombers, which eventually led to the Eskimos offensive burst.

The Eskimo charge began in the second quarter after a poor Serna punt into a gusting 30-km/h wind caused a 25-yard return by Tristan Jackson to the Blue Bombers' 32-yard line, which eventually led to an A.J. Harris 1-yard rushing touchdown to make it a 10-8 Edmonton lead. Two minutes after Edmonton took the lead, the Blue Bombers answered back with a touchdown on a Jason Armstead 93-yard punt return, a franchise record to give Winnipeg a 15–10 lead. However the Eskimos took the game over after that point. Right after a 28-yard field goal by Noel Prefontaine, Eskimos' defensive end Fred Perry tipped and intercepted a Kevin Glenn pass for a 31-yard interception return to give the Eskimos a 20–15 lead, which proved to be the turning point in the game. At the end of the second quarter the Eskimos had scored 18 unanswered points and never looked back.

At the six minute mark of the third quarter, A.J. Harris scored his second rushing touchdown of the game, which ended Edmonton's scoring in the game and gave them a 29–15 lead. Eskimos' quarterback Ricky Ray effectively used a short passing strategy to finish the game going 27-of-37 for 303 yards with no interceptions and ran for 25 yards. Ray's favourite weapons in the game were running backs A.J. Harris who rushed for 33 yards on 13 carries and made four receptions for 38 yards, while Calvin McCarty had seven catches for 52 yards. However, the Eskimos defence was the main reason for their victory on Saturday.

Going into the game, the Blue Bomber rushing duo of Fred Reid and Joe Smith was touted to give the home team an edge in the game, but neither of them were able to find the end zone after rushing for a combined 119 rushing yards (Reid, 80; Smith, 39). Even when Winnipeg had a promising drive going late in the third, the Eskimo defence were able to snuff it out after Lenny Williams forced Joe Smith to fumble the ball after a 21-yard gain, which was eventually recovered by Edmonton's Jason Goss. In addition, when Winnipeg had the wind advantage in the fourth quarter they only managed two Serna field goals to round up their score to 21.

Winnipeg quarterback Kevin Glenn only managed 15 completions on 34 attempts for 233 yards and threw for one touchdown and the costly interception to Fred Perry. Milt Stegall managed 56 receiving yards on five receptions, in his final appearance in the CFL.

While the Winnipeg season comes to an end, Edmonton will now head to Montreal to face their long-time Grey Cup rivals, the Montreal Alouettes .

==== West Semi-Final ====
Date and time: Saturday, November 8, 3:30 PM Central Standard Time
Venue: Mosaic Stadium at Taylor Field, Regina, Saskatchewan

Team	Q1	Q2	Q3	Q4	Total
BC Lions	7	9	10	7	33
Saskatchewan Roughriders	0	6	3	3	12

Buck Pierce and Stefan Logan lead the BC Lions to victory on Saturday, defeating the defending Grey Cup champions, in front of a sold out and ravenous "Rider Nation" crowd at Mosaic Stadium at Taylor Field, 33–12 in the West Semi-Final.

On offence, Lions' quarterback, Buck Pierce completed 23 of 31 passes for 221 yards and threw a 14-yard touchdown pass to fullback, Lyle Green for the game's first touchdown score with just two minutes left in the second quarter. The second Lions' touchdown occurred with just one minute left in the third quarter when quarterback Jarious Jackson, who would come in on 1-yard situations, made a trick play and completed a 31-yard touchdown pass to wide receiver, Geroy Simon, who was left wide open. In addition, Lions' running back Stefan Logan ran for 153 yards on 18 carries in the win.

While the Lions' offence was successful, the same could not be said for the Roughriders who turned over the ball seven times in the game. In addition, quarterback, Michael Bishop struggled by only completing 14 of 27 passes for only 172 yards and threw three interceptions and fumbled the ball twice. Bishop eventually was replaced by Darian Durant after he threw an interception, which led to the third Lions' touchdown on a 54-yard interception return by Ryan Phillips who recorded two interceptions in the game. Furthermore, running back Wes Cates only rushed for 23 yards on nine carries, while all the scores for the Roughriders came from field-goals as kicker, Luca Congi went four for four in the game.

With the victory, the Lions headed to Calgary to face the Stampeders in the West Final.

Two days later, Riders QB Michael Bishop was placed on waivers.

=== Division Finals ===
==== East Final ====
Date and time: Saturday, November 15, 1:00 PM Eastern Standard Time
Venue: Olympic Stadium, Montreal, Quebec

Team	Q1	Q2	Q3	Q4	Total
Edmonton Eskimos	7	6	0	13	26
Montreal Alouettes	3	16	10	7	36

Montreal's wide receiver, Larry Taylor was hardly the name on everyone's lips as the CFL's East final got underway on Saturday afternoon, since this game was billed as a showdown between quarterbacks Anthony Calvillo and Edmonton's Ricky Ray, both of whom are regarded as the league's best pivots with the winner playing in the Grey Cup finals. However, Larry Taylor rushed two punt returns to score two touchdowns and lead the Montreal Alouettes to a 36–26 win to play in front of their home fans in the 98th Grey Cup.

Although, in the early stages of the game, the Edmonton Eskimos had the early advantage as they put the opening points on the board using a play that had nothing to do with either quarterback. As Montreal lined up to punt on their own 24, Edmonton lineman, Justin Cooper blew right through a hole that opened when the snapper and right guard blocked opposite directions and there was no one in the backfield to pick up the rush. Cooper almost caught Montreal kicker Damon Duval's kick right off the foot, but was still able to deflect the football which eventually bounced into the Montreal end zone. Cooper recovered for a touchdown to give the Eskimos a 7–0 lead.

After a Damon Duval field goal made it 7–3, Edmonton's Ricky Ray came back with his own drive that led to a Noel Prefontaine 45-yard field goal, which gave Edmonton a 10–3 lead. Prefontaine eventually added another field goal kicking a 22-yarder, five minutes into the second quarter for a 13-3 Edmonton lead. However, the Eskimos were unable to generate any momentum with their opening lead. Despite outplaying the hosts for about 21 of the 24 minutes, Edmonton saw their early lead disappear.

Trailing 13-5 after Edmonton surrendered a safety, the Alouettes offence finally got on track as Anthony Calvillo began to get his usual protection from the Montreal offensive line. He led a nine-play, 75-yard drive ending in an eight-yard toss off a post pattern to Alouettes' wide receiver Jamel Richardson to score the first touchdown of the game for Montreal. The Montreal defence held the Edmonton offence to a quick two and out, which forced Noel Prefontaine to punt the ball away. It landed in the hands of Larry Taylor who was able to get a couple of key blocks and made a nice cut back to run the ball for 62 yards for the touchdown, giving the Alouettes their first lead with 1:07 left in the second quarter. An eight-point Edmonton lead had evaporated into a 19-13 Montreal lead heading into halftime.

In the third quarter, the Montreal offence continued their scoring surge, first on a long, strange drive that included two drops of perfect passes from Anthony Calvillo and seemed to end with a touchdown run by backup quarterback Adrian McPherson. However, the touchdown was called back due to an inadvertent whistle, but Montreal running back, Avon Cobourne then ran it into the endzone to give the Alouettes a 26–13 lead. The other key moment in that drive for the Alouettes was an injury to Eskimos defensive back, Jason Goss. The injury forced Edmonton to make a couple of changes to their defensive setup, which the Alouettes offence were able to exploit. Damon Duval also kicked his second field goal of the game to give the Montreal Alouettes a comfortable 29–13 lead heading into the fourth quarter.

With the score 29–13 in the fourth quarter, the Montreal Alouettes added to their lead when Larry Taylor scored his second punt reception touchdown when he received a Noel Prefontaine punt on the Alouettes 13-yard line after four perfect blocks opened a huge hole up in the middle to give Montreal a 23-point lead. The Eskimos tried to mount a comeback after scoring two touchdowns. The first was from Ricky Ray who put together a 55-yard passing play for a touchdown to Kelly Campbell. Tristan Jackson was then able to close the gap to 10 points after he scored a touchdown on a long punt return. But a missed two-point conversion sealed the victory for the Montreal Alouettes, despite an Edmonton recovery on an on-side kick that set up a last gasp, which quickly ran out of steam.

Anthony Calvillo finished the day 20-for-32, 295 yards and a touchdown as the Eskimos' defence did a good job of keeping him under control, although, Montreal received a superb 140 yards in total offence from running back, Avon Cobourne, working off a sore ankle, including 52 on the ground. Ricky Ray, meanwhile, tossed the ball an astonishing 49 times (26 receptions for 339 yards and a touchdown) as part of an offensive game plan that simply ignored a running game completely. Already boasting the league's worst ground attack, Edmonton's coaching staff put Ray in a tactical straitjacket by running just three times all game for just three yards.

==== West Final ====
Date and time: Saturday, November 15, 2:30 PM Mountain Standard Time
Venue: McMahon Stadium, Calgary, Alberta

Team	Q1	Q2	Q3	Q4	Total
BC Lions	6	6	3	3	18
Calgary Stampeders	0	9	6	7	22

The BC Lions inability to defeat the Calgary Stampeders in 2008, continued in the Western Final as the Lions inability to take advantage of numerous offensive opportunities proved to be their undoing as the Calgary Stampeders advanced to the Grey Cup championship game for the first time in seven years. The Stampeders bend-but-not-break defence limited the BC Lions to six field goals earning a 22–18 win at McMahon Stadium.

The BC Lions did a great job moving the ball in the first half as they had 229 yards of total offence compared to only Calgary's 89, which was also helped by running back, Stefan Logan who was outstanding in the first half, rushing for 94 yards on 13 carries against a Stampeder defence that was specifically designed to stop the run. However, the BC Lions were not able to finish, which came back to hurt them before halftime.

Already leading 3–0, Lions quarterback, Buck Pierce led his club on a long first-quarter drive that should have produced a touchdown, but a hard throw into the end zone bounced in and out of receiver, Ryan Grice-Mullen's hands that resulted in a 30-yard field goal by Paul McCallum, to increase the Lions lead to 6–0. After another Calgary punt, the BC Lions put together another impressive offensive drive that was highlighted by a 12-yard run from backup quarterback, Jarious Jackson, who was in for one play and was complemented with nice receptions by receivers, Jason Clermont and Geroy Simon. But the Stampeders defence again stood their ground and the Lions took another McCallum (35-yarder) field goal to increase their lead, 9–0. After giving up a safety, the BC Lions put another impressive offensive drive as Buck Pierce had a favourable situation with a first down on the Calgary 23-yard line. However, after a Stefan Logan three-yard run and an overthrow in the end zone for Jason Clermont, McCallum had to come in to kick his fourth field goal of the first half for a 12-2 Lions lead.

With one minute remaining in the second quarter, Stampeders quarterback Henry Burris put together a quick five-play drive that resulted in a touchdown pass to receiver Ken-Yon Rambo. He pulled the ball in behind Lions cornerback Dante Marsh with nine seconds left on the clock to cut the lead to 12-9 into halftime and giving Calgary the momentum.

In the third quarter, the BC Lions again threatened to score a touchdown to increase their lead, however, Calgary's defensive end, Mike Labinjo made two consecutive tackles on the goal line to prevent a Lions touchdown early in the second half, which caused Paul McCallum to kick a 12-yard field goal, his fifth of the game to make it 15–9 for the Lions. However, Calgary kicker, Sandro DeAngelis kicked two field goals in the third quarter to tie the game 15-15, heading into the fourth quarter.

The Stampeders built on that momentum, when quarterback Henry Burris and the Calgary offence put together an eight-play drive in the fourth quarter, capped by Burris's one-yard touchdown run at 11:57 to give the Stampeders their first lead of the game, 22–15. A few minutes later, Paul McCallum kicked his sixth field goal of the game from 30 yards to cut Calgary's lead to four points, but the Lions were not able to score any more points, as they were held in check for the remainder of the game by the Stampeders' stellar defence, especially cornerback, Brandon Browner who intercepted a Buck Pierce pass with 1:19 remaining in the game. However, the star of the game was Mike Labinjo, who not only made two key tackles to prevent a BC Lions touchdown in the third quarter, but recorded two sacks and forced a fumble in the game.

Although Lions' quarterback, Buck Pierce started strong and completed 16-of-29 passes for 262 yards, his inability to get a touchdown for the Lions' offence proved to be costly, especially throwing an interception at the late stages of the game. His counterpart and finalist for this year's most outstanding player award, Henry Burris had a slow start in the first half and threw for one interception, as well, but was able to bounce back and complete 17-of-27 passes for 236 yards and was able to throw one touchdown completion and rushed in for the winning touchdown that proved to be the difference in the game.

With the win, the Calgary Stampeders will head to Montreal and play against the hometown, Montreal Alouettes for the chance to win their sixth Grey Cup in team history.
