= 2009 CFL season =

Canadian Football League season

- Duration: July 1 – November 8, 2009
- East champions: Montreal Alouettes
- West champions: Saskatchewan Roughriders

97th Grey Cup
- Date: November 29, 2009
- Venue: McMahon Stadium, Calgary
- Champions: Montreal Alouettes

CFL seasons
- ← 2008 2010 →

Canadian Football League team locations: West, East

The 2009 CFL season was the 56th season of modern-day Canadian football. Officially, it was the 52nd season of the Canadian Football League. The Montreal Alouettes won the 97th Grey Cup on November 29, 2009 with a last second 28–27 win over the Saskatchewan Roughriders. The 19-week regular schedule, issued February 3 began on July 1, which was only the second time in league history that a CFL season started on Canada Day, with the first occurring in 1998. The playoffs started on November 15 and two weeks of pre-season games began on June 17.

== CFL news in 2009 ==
=== Arena football suspension and moves for expansion ===
In February unexpected news was made when an American group, led by ex-NFL receiver Oronde Gadsden, announced their intentions to pursue a franchise in the CFL. Citing the suspension of the 2009 season of the Arena Football League and the demise of NFL Europe as a potential opportunity for growth the US market, Gadsen's group highlighted either Detroit–Windsor or Rochester, New York as possible locations for a new team. Reaction from the CFL with respect to Gadsen's intentions was mixed, however, with league head office iterating a reluctance to return to US expansion while the Montreal Alouettes' American owner, Robert Wetenhall, welcoming the concept of bids involving border regions. Wetenhall's organization had spent its first two years in Baltimore in the 1990s, though under different ownership; Wetenhall having purchased the Alouettes after they had resumed play in Montreal.

The mayor of Moncton, premier of New Brunswick, and league commissioner Mark Cohon met in February to negotiate a deal that would see the city host a regular season game annually over five years, beginning in the 2010 CFL season.

=== Rule changes ===
Several main rule changes were proposed for 2009 by fans at the request of CFL commissioner Mark Cohon. The following changes were implemented:

- The elimination of the option for the scored-upon team to scrimmage from its 35-yard line after field goals, which was first enacted in 1975. This was said to add excitement by preventing a team up by six points to scrimmage and take a knee three times to effectively end the game with one minute to go. Although it had good intentions, the results for this rule change was not as expected, and for the 2010 CFL season, the league reinstated the option again.
- Kickoffs being from the 25-yard line rather than the 35-yard line following a safety: the average kickoff in 2008 went 60 yards downfield, while the average kickoff return was 21 yards, making the option between scrimmaging and receiving kickoffs a wash.
- Removing the restriction that a quarterback must take the snap from the centre. This effectively legalizes the wildcat offense (where a running back takes the snap) in Canadian football, which had long been legal in American football.
- Video replays for coaches challenges will now ordinarily be reviewed at a command centre in the CFL's office in Toronto rather than in the video replay booth on the field. As well, if a team is successful in its two replay challenges, they will be awarded a third one.

Other rule changes considered included moving the kickoff back 10 yards for all kicks (not just following safeties), and moving the ball back during conversions.

=== Hall of Fame induction weekend ===
For only the second time in its 39-year history, the Canadian Football Hall of Fame induction weekend events did not take place in Hamilton, Ontario, the home of the museum. It took place in Winnipeg from September 24 to 26, finishing with the tribute game between the Blue Bombers and Argonauts on September 26.

=== Bye weeks ===
Byes in the two weeks preceding the Labour Day Classic games were retained, however the byes were changed so as to ensure that each pair of Labour Day Classic opponents will have equal rest as opposed to splitting the byes by division.

=== CFL retro ===
West Division Retro Jerseys

East Division Retro Jerseys

As the league approaches the 100th Grey Cup, the CFL celebrated the 1960s with all eight teams wearing retro-themed uniforms from that era at different points in the season. All teams wore their retro uniforms in Week 3. The Saskatchewan Roughriders and the Calgary Stampeders were the only teams to wear both home and away retro uniforms, while the remaining teams wore one set of uniforms. The BC Lions wore their black alternate jerseys in combination with their retro pants and helmets for a "retro look," but did not introduce new home retro jerseys.

=== Records and milestones ===
- On September 19, BC Lions head coach, Wally Buono became the CFL's all-time leader in coaching victories, surpassing Don Matthews' total of 231.

== Regular season ==
East Division
Pos	Team	Pld	W	L	T	PF	PA	PD	Pts
1	Montreal Alouettes (C, Q)	18	15	3	0	600	324	+276	30
2	Hamilton Tiger-Cats (Q)	18	9	9	0	449	428	+21	18
3	Winnipeg Blue Bombers	18	7	11	0	386	508	−122	14
4	Toronto Argonauts	18	3	15	0	328	502	−174	6

Source: "2009 Regular Season Standings". Canadian Football League. Archived from the original on February 9, 2010.
(C) First round bye; (Q) Qualified for playoffs

West Division
Pos	Team	Pld	W	L	T	PF	PA	PD	Pts
1	Saskatchewan Roughriders (C, Q)	18	10	7	1	514	484	+30	21
2	Calgary Stampeders (Q)	18	10	7	1	514	443	+71	21
3	Edmonton Eskimos (Q)	18	9	9	0	469	502	−33	18
4	BC Lions (Q)	18	8	10	0	431	502	−71	16

Source: "2009 Regular Season Standings". Canadian Football League. Archived from the original on February 9, 2010.
(C) First round bye; (Q) Qualified for playoffs

Notes

- Saskatchewan earned first place in the West due to their winning of the season series (2–0–1) against Calgary.
- B.C. qualified for the playoffs in place of Winnipeg due to the "cross-over rule," as B.C. finished with more points.

== Grey Cup playoffs ==
The Montreal Alouettes were the 2009 Grey Cup champions, defeating the Saskatchewan Roughriders, 28–27 on a field goal by Damon Duval at Calgary's McMahon Stadium on the last play of the game. It was the first Grey Cup for the Alouettes since 2002. Alouettes' runningback Avon Cobourne was named the Grey Cup Most Valuable Player, and slotback, Ben Cahoon was named the Grey Cup Most Valuable Canadian.

=== Playoff bracket ===
November 15: Division Semifinals
East
W4	BC Lions	34*
E2	Hamilton Tiger-Cats	27
West
W3	Edmonton Eskimos	21
W2	Calgary Stampeders	24

November 22: Division Finals
W4	BC Lions	18
E1	Montreal Alouettes	56
W2	Calgary Stampeders	17
W1	Saskatchewan Roughriders	27

November 29: 97th Grey Cup; McMahon Stadium – Calgary
E1	Montreal Alouettes	28
W1	Saskatchewan Roughriders	27

*-Team won in Overtime.

== CFL leaders ==
- CFL passing leaders
- CFL rushing leaders
- CFL receiving leaders

== 2009 CFL All-Stars ==
=== Offence ===
- QB – Anthony Calvillo, Montreal Alouettes
- RB – Avon Cobourne, Montreal Alouettes
- RB – Joffrey Reynolds, Calgary Stampeders
- WR – Jeremaine Copeland, Calgary Stampeders
- WR – Arland Bruce III, Hamilton Tiger-Cats
- WR – Kerry Watkins, Montreal Alouettes
- WR – Fred Stamps, Edmonton Eskimos
- OT – Ben Archibald, Calgary Stampeders
- OT – Dan Goodspeed, Hamilton Tiger-Cats
- OG – Gene Makowsky, Saskatchewan Roughriders
- OG – Scott Flory, Montreal Alouettes
- OC – Jeremy O'Day, Saskatchewan Roughriders

=== Defence ===
- DT – Doug Brown, Winnipeg Blue Bombers
- DT – Keron Williams, Montreal Alouettes
- DE – Anwar Stewart, Montreal Alouettes
- DE – John Chick, Saskatchewan Roughriders
- LB – Chip Cox, Montreal Alouettes
- LB – Markeith Knowlton, Hamilton Tiger-Cats
- LB – Jamall Johnson, Hamilton Tiger-Cats
- CB – Brandon Browner, Calgary Stampeders
- CB – Jovon Johnson, Winnipeg Blue Bombers
- DB – Jonathan Hefney, Winnipeg Blue Bombers
- DB – Korey Banks, BC Lions
- S – Barron Miles, BC Lions

=== Special teams ===
- K – Damon Duval, Montreal Alouettes
- P – Damon Duval, Montreal Alouettes
- ST – Larry Taylor, Montreal Alouettes

== 2009 Western All-Stars ==
=== Western offence ===
- QB – Darian Durant, Saskatchewan Roughriders
- RB – Martell Mallett, BC Lions
- RB – Joffrey Reynolds, Calgary Stampeders
- WR – Jeremaine Copeland, Calgary Stampeders
- SB – Weston Dressler, Saskatchewan Roughriders
- SB – Geroy Simon, BC Lions
- WR – Fred Stamps, Edmonton Eskimos
- OT – Ben Archibald, Calgary Stampeders
- OT – Calvin Armstrong, Edmonton Eskimos
- OG – Gene Makowsky, Saskatchewan Roughriders
- OG – Dimitri Tsoumpas, Calgary Stampeders
- OC – Jeremy O'Day, Saskatchewan Roughriders

=== Western defence ===
- DT – Aaron Hunt, BC Lions
- DT – Dario Romero, Edmonton Eskimos
- DE – Stevie Baggs, Saskatchewan Roughriders
- DE – John Chick, Saskatchewan Roughriders
- LB – Tad Kornegay, Saskatchewan Roughriders
- LB – Sean Lucas, Saskatchewan Roughriders
- LB – Anton McKenzie, BC Lions
- CB – Dwight Anderson, Calgary Stampeders
- CB – Brandon Browner, Calgary Stampeders
- DB – Korey Banks, BC Lions
- DB – Lance Frazier, Saskatchewan Roughriders
- S – Barron Miles, BC Lions

=== Western special teams ===
- K – Sandro DeAngelis, Calgary Stampeders
- P – Burke Dales, Calgary Stampeders
- ST – Jason Arakgi, BC Lions

== 2009 Eastern All-Stars ==
=== Eastern offence ===
- QB – Anthony Calvillo, Montreal Alouettes
- RB – Avon Cobourne, Montreal Alouettes
- RB – Fred Reid, Winnipeg Blue Bombers
- WR – Arland Bruce III, Hamilton Tiger-Cats
- WR – Ben Cahoon, Montreal Alouettes
- WR – Jamel Richardson, Montreal Alouettes
- WR – Kerry Watkins, Montreal Alouettes
- OT – Dan Goodspeed, Hamilton Tiger-Cats
- OT – Josh Bourke, Montreal Alouettes
- OG – Scott Flory, Montreal Alouettes
- OG – Brendon LaBatte, Winnipeg Blue Bombers
- OC – Bryan Chiu, Montreal Alouettes

=== Eastern defence ===
- DT – Doug Brown, Winnipeg Blue Bombers
- DT – Keron Williams, Montreal Alouettes
- DE – Anwar Stewart, Montreal Alouettes
- DE – John Bowman, Montreal Alouettes
- LB – Chip Cox, Montreal Alouettes
- LB – Markeith Knowlton, Hamilton Tiger-Cats
- LB – Jamall Johnson, Hamilton Tiger-Cats
- CB – Mark Estelle, Montreal Alouettes
- CB – Jovon Johnson, Winnipeg Blue Bombers
- DB – Jonathan Hefney, Winnipeg Blue Bombers
- DB – Lenny Walls, Winnipeg Blue Bombers
- S – Matthieu Proulx, Montreal Alouettes

=== Eastern special teams ===
- K – Damon Duval, Montreal Alouettes
- P – Damon Duval, Montreal Alouettes
- ST – Larry Taylor, Montreal Alouettes

== 2009 CFLPA Pro Player All-Stars ==
=== Offence ===
- QB – Anthony Calvillo, Montreal Alouettes
- RB – Joffrey Reynolds, Calgary Stampeders
- RB – Mathieu Bertrand, Edmonton Eskimos
- WR – Maurice Mann, Edmonton Eskimos
- WR – Arland Bruce III, Hamilton Tiger-Cats
- WR – Kerry Watkins, Montreal Alouettes
- WR – Fred Stamps, Edmonton Eskimos
- OT – Ben Archibald, Calgary Stampeders
- OT – Dan Goodspeed, Hamilton Tiger-Cats
- OG – Dmitri Tsoumpas, Calgary Stampeders
- OG – Scott Flory, Montreal Alouettes
- OC – Marwan Hage, Hamilton Tiger-Cats

=== Defence ===
- DT – Doug Brown, Winnipeg Blue Bombers
- DT – Keron Williams, Montreal Alouettes
- DE – Anwar Stewart, Montreal Alouettes
- DE – John Chick, Saskatchewan Roughriders
- LB – Maurice Lloyd, Edmonton Eskimos
- LB – Otis Floyd, Hamilton Tiger-Cats
- LB – Jamall Johnson, Hamilton Tiger-Cats
- CB – Brandon Browner, Calgary Stampeders
- CB – Jovon Johnson, Winnipeg Blue Bombers
- DB – Jonathan Hefney, Winnipeg Blue Bombers
- DB – Korey Banks, BC Lions
- S – Barron Miles, BC Lions

=== Special teams ===
- K – Damon Duval, Montreal Alouettes
- P – Burke Dales, Calgary Stampeders
- ST – Larry Taylor, Montreal Alouettes

=== Head coach ===
- Marc Trestman, Montreal Alouettes

== 2009 Gibson's Finest CFL Awards ==
- CFL's Most Outstanding Player Award – Anthony Calvillo (QB), Montreal Alouettes
- CFL's Most Outstanding Canadian Award – Ricky Foley (DE), BC Lions
- CFL's Most Outstanding Defensive Player Award – John Chick (DE), Saskatchewan Roughriders
- CFL's Most Outstanding Offensive Lineman Award – Scott Flory (OG), Montreal Alouettes
- CFL's Most Outstanding Rookie Award – Martell Mallett (RB), BC Lions
- John Agro Special Teams Award – Larry Taylor (WR), Montreal Alouettes
- Tom Pate Memorial Award – Marwan Hage (C), Hamilton Tiger-Cats
- Annis Stukus Trophy – Marc Trestman, Montreal Alouettes
- Commissioner's Award – Wally Buono, Calgary Stampeders-BC Lions
- Hugh Campbell Distinguished Leadership Award - Stan Schwartz, Calgary Stampeders
