= 2016 Toronto Argonauts season =

CFL team season

- General manager: Jim Barker
- Head coach: Scott Milanovich
- Home stadium: BMO Field

Results
- Record: 5–13
- Division place: 4th, East
- Playoffs: did not qualify
- Team MOP: Brandon Whitaker
- Team MOC: Lirim Hajrullahu
- Team MOR: Sean McEwen

Uniform

The 2016 Toronto Argonauts season was the 59th season for the team in the Canadian Football League (CFL) and their 144th season overall. The Argonauts finished in fourth place in the East Division with a 5–13 record and missed the playoffs for the second time in three years. It also marks the second straight year the Grey Cup hosts have failed to make the playoffs after the Winnipeg Blue Bombers last season.

After the Hamilton Tiger-Cats defeated the Ottawa Redblacks in overtime in week 18 on October 21, 2016, the Argonauts were eliminated from the playoffs while they were playing in the second quarter against the Calgary Stampeders. This was the team's fifth season under head coach Scott Milanovich, and the sixth under general manager Jim Barker. It was announced in January 2017 that Jim Barker would be relieved of his duties as general manager after a disappointing 2016 CFL season which saw the Argonauts win a league low 5 games that season, tied with the Saskatchewan Roughriders for league worst that season. Shortly after Jim Barker's termination, Scott Milanovich resigned from his duties as the Argonauts' head coach to work as an assistant coach with the Jacksonville Jaguars.

This was the first season for the Argonauts at their new home stadium, BMO Field, as renovations now allow Canadian football to be played there. The team had averaged 16,380 in fan attendance and had a season high 24,812 fans attend the home opener. The club also had a new ownership group, with Larry Tanenbaum and Bell Canada officially taking ownership on January 1, 2016.

== Offseason ==
=== CFL draft ===
The 2016 CFL draft took place on May 10, 2016. The Argonauts had nine selections in the eight-round draft after trading Bruce Campbell for another fourth-round pick.

Round	Pick	Player	Position	School/Club team
1	4	Brian Jones	WR	Acadia
2	13	DJ Sackey	OL	Toronto
3	22	Jamal Campbell	OL	York
4	27	Declan Cross	RB	McMaster
4	31	Llevi Noel	WR	Windsor AKO Fratmen
5	40	Curtis Newton	LB	Guelph
6	49	Chris Kolankowski	OL	York
7	58	Johnathan Ngeleka Muamba	DB	McMaster
8	66	Ryan Nieuwesteeg	RB	Guelph

== Preseason ==
Week	Date	Kickoff	Opponent	Results		TV	Venue	Attendance	Summary
Week	Date	Kickoff	Opponent	Score	Record	TV	Venue	Attendance	Summary
A	Sat, June 11	4:00 p.m. EDT	vs. Hamilton Tiger-Cats	W 25–16	1–0	None	BMO Field	16,168	Recap
B	Fri, June 17	7:30 p.m. EDT	at Montreal Alouettes	L 22–15	1–1	TSN/RDS	Molson Stadium	14,882	Recap

# Games played with colour uniforms.

== Regular season ==
=== Standings ===
East Division
Team	GP	W	L	T	Pts	PF	PA	Div	Stk	
Ottawa Redblacks	18	8	9	1	17	486	498	5–3	L1	Details
Hamilton Tiger-Cats	18	7	11	0	14	507	502	5–3	L2	Details
Montreal Alouettes	18	7	11	0	14	383	416	3–5	W3	Details
Toronto Argonauts	18	5	13	0	10	383	568	3–5	L7	Details

=== Schedule ===
Week	Date	Kickoff	Opponent	Results		TV	Venue	Attendance	Summary
Week	Date	Kickoff	Opponent	Score	Record	TV	Venue	Attendance	Summary
1	Thurs, June 23	7:30 p.m. EDT	Hamilton Tiger-Cats	L 20–42	0–1	TSN/RDS/ESPNEWS	BMO Field	24,812	Recap
2	Thurs, June 30	10:00 p.m. EDT	@ Saskatchewan Roughriders	W 30–17	1–1	TSN/RDS2/ESPN2	Mosaic Stadium	29,896	Recap
3	Thurs, July 7	10:00 p.m. EDT	@ BC Lions	W 25–14	2–1	TSN/RDS2/ESPN2	BC Place	18,921	Recap
4	Wed, July 13	7:30 p.m. EDT	Ottawa Redblacks	L 20–30	2–2	TSN/RDS	BMO Field	12,373	Recap
5	Mon, July 25	7:30 p.m. EDT	Montreal Alouettes	W 30–17	3–2	TSN/RDS/ESPN2	BMO Field	16,048	Recap
6	Sun, July 31	7:30 p.m. EDT	@ Ottawa Redblacks	W 23–20	4–2	TSN/RDS2/ESPN2	TD Place Stadium	24,894	Recap
7	Bye								
8	Fri, Aug 12	7:30 p.m. EDT	Winnipeg Blue Bombers	L 17–34	4–3	TSN	BMO Field	15,063	Recap
9	Sat, Aug 20	4:00 p.m. EDT	Edmonton Eskimos	L 23–46	4–4	TSN	BMO Field	15,157	Recap
10	Bye								
11	Wed, Aug 31	7:30 p.m. EDT	BC Lions	L 13–16	4–5	TSN	BMO Field	17,509	Recap
11	Mon, Sept 5	6:30 p.m. EDT	@ Hamilton Tiger-Cats	L 36–49	4–6	TSN	Tim Hortons Field	24,512	Recap
12	Sun, Sept 11	4:30 p.m. EDT	Hamilton Tiger-Cats	W 33–21	5–6	TSN	BMO Field	17,214	Recap
13	Sat, Sept 17	2:00 p.m. EDT	@ Winnipeg Blue Bombers	L 29–46	5–7	TSN	Investors Group Field	25,943	Recap
14	Fri, Sept 23	7:00 p.m. EDT	@ Ottawa Redblacks	L 12–29	5–8	TSN/RDS2	TD Place Stadium	25,088	Recap
15	Sun, Oct 2	1:00 p.m. EDT	@ Montreal Alouettes	L 11–38	5–9	TSN2/RDS	Molson Stadium	23,420	Recap
16	Mon, Oct 10	4:00 p.m. EDT	Calgary Stampeders	L 20–48	5–10	TSN	BMO Field	14,224	Recap
17	Sat, Oct 15	4:00 p.m. EDT	Saskatchewan Roughriders	L 11–29	5–11	TSN	BMO Field	15,023	Recap
18	Fri, Oct 21	10:00 p.m. EDT	@ Calgary Stampeders	L 13–31	5–12	TSN	McMahon Stadium	27,520	Recap
19	Bye								
20	Sat, Nov 5	4:00 p.m. EDT	@ Edmonton Eskimos	L 17–41	5–13	TSN	Commonwealth Stadium	33,514	Recap

# Games played with colour uniforms.
# Games played with white uniforms.

== Team ==
The team was led at quarterback by Ricky Ray, who had three statistically brilliant seasons between 2012 and 2014, earning eastern Most Outstanding Player nominations in the latter two years. Ray battled injuries in each of his five seasons as an Argonaut and has not played an entire 18 game season since his last season in Edmonton. Following the departure of Trevor Harris to the Ottawa RedBlacks in early 2016, the backup QB situation was a bit of a revolving door; with Logan Kilgore, Dan LeFevour, Cody Fajardo, and Drew Willy all taking snaps under centre.

The receiving corps remained largely unchanged from the previous season with Tori Gurley, Kevin Elliott, and Vidal Hazelton (The Big Three) returning after posting productive seasons in 2015, also returning to the receiving group were Diontae Spencer and Kenny Shaw. On October 3, 2016, the team announced they had released Gurley, Elliott, and Hazelton, along with Phil Bates. The move was considered a shock by most, but post-game comments by Scott Milanovich in Montreal on October 2, 2016 following a loss to the Als revealed the move which was about to take place was about more than just on-field issues. "We've got some good football players here that I'm not sure are real committed to what we need to have take place, and it's little things; being late, not showing up prepared, screwing around and that's where we're at right now, it's not going to stay that way."

Running back Brandon Whitaker was leaned on heavily and was having a productive season. He finished second in the league in rushing yards with 1009 on 186 carries, which was his second career 1000-yard rushing season, earning him a third consecutive Eastern All-Star award.

On the defensive side of the ball, following last season's departure of star defensive linemen Cleyon Laing and Tristan Okpalaugo to the NFL's Miami Dolphins and Arizona Cardinals respectively, the Argos were able to secure the services of Justin Hickman and Bryan Hall from the Hamilton Tiger-Cats, as well as trade OL Matt Sewell and QB Mitchell Gale to the Saskatchewan Roughriders for DE Shawn Lemon and a conditional 2018 draft pick. Lemon seemed to fit into Defensive Coordinator Rich Stubler's system well, as he finished with 14 sacks (career high) in 16 games and earned his first East Division All-Star nomination.

== Roster ==
2016 Toronto Argonauts final roster
Quarterbacks: 10 Logan Kilgore; 18 Dan LeFevour; 15 Ricky Ray; 2 Drew Willy; Running backs: 38 Declan Cross; 43 Alexandre Dupuis; 34 Ben Malena; 3 Brandon Whitaker; Receivers: 1 Anthony Coombs; 32 Andre Durie; 6 Brian Jones; 84 Llevi Noel; 80 DeVier Posey; 8 Kenny Shaw; 85 Diontae Spencer; 11 Devon Wylie	Offensive linemen: 67 Jamal Campbell T; 57 Tyler Holmes G; 61 Sean McEwen C/G; 65 D. J. Sackey G; 52 Wayne Smith G; 62 Greg Van Roten C/T/G; 54 Chris Van Zeyl T; 56 Corey Watman G; Defensive linemen: 97 Ken Bishop DT; 4 Bryan Hall DT; 7 Justin Hickman DE; 40 Shawn Lemon DE; 93 Eric Martin DE; 98 Tracy Robertson DT	Linebackers: 41 Kyler Elsworth; 30 Thomas Gordon; 27 Cory Greenwood; 36 Marshall McFadden; 48 Thomas Miles; 45 Curtis Newton; 47 James Yurichuk; Defensive backs: 37 Marcus Alford; 33 Aaron Berry; 39 Matt Black; 46 Michael Carter; 5 Jermaine Gabriel; 24 A. J. Jefferson; 19 Devin Smith	Special teams: 70 Lirim Hajrullahu K/P; 58 Jake Reinhart LS; Practice roster: 23 Ri'shard Anderson DB; 90 Trevonti Barber LB; 86 Kevin Bradfield SB; 69 Joe Circelli G; 83 Chuck Jacobs WR; 44 Chad Kackert RB; 88 Jameon Lewis WR; 89 Joe Morgan WR; 49 Terrance Plummer LB; 42 Winston Rose DB; 64 Davonte Wallace G; 63 Brandon Washington G; 82 Malcolm Williams WR	Injured list: 59 Josh Bourke T; 92 Troy Davis DE; 17 Cody Fajardo QB; 95 Ricky Foley DE; 25 Isaiah Green DB; 28 Brandon Isaac LB; 29 Josh Mitchell DB; 9 Akwasi Owusu-Ansah DB; 26 Joe Rankin DB; 35 Rod Sweeting DB; 75 Cameron Walker DE; 99 Daryl Waud DT; Suspended: Da'Rick Rogers WR; Italics indicate international player Transactions (cfl.ca)

== Coaching staff ==
2016 Toronto Argonauts staff
Front office and support staff: Owner – Larry Tanenbaum / Bell Media; President and ceo – Michael Copeland; Special advisor – Michael Clemons; General manager – Jim Barker; Director of football operations – Ian Sanderson; Director of player personnel – Chris Rukavina; US Scouting Coordinator - Spencer Zimmerman; Director canadian scouting – Vince Magri; Consultant, Football Operations – Nick Volpe; Equipment manager – Danny Webb; Assistant equipment manager – Tom Bryce; Head athletic therapist – Scott Shannon; Assistant athletic therapist – Josh Shewell	Head coaches: Head coach – Scott Milanovich; Offensive coaches: Offensive coordinator – Marcus Brady; Running backs – Anthony Ierullo; Receivers – Taylor Stubblefield; Offensive line – Mike Preston; Defensive coaches: Defensive coordinator – Rich Stubler; Defensive Line - Kit Lathrop; Linebackers – D. J. Wingate; Defensive Backs - Jordan Younger; Special teams coaches: Special teams coordinator – Kelly Jeffrey; Assistant special teams – Bradley Daye; → Coaching staff
