= 2017 Toronto Argonauts season =

CFL team season

- General manager: Jim Popp
- Head coach: Marc Trestman
- Home stadium: BMO Field

Results
- Record: 9–9
- Division place: 1st, East
- Playoffs: Won Grey Cup
- Team MOP: Ricky Ray
- Team MOC: Sean McEwen
- Team MOR: James Wilder Jr.

Uniform

The 2017 Toronto Argonauts season was the 60th season for the team in the Canadian Football League (CFL) and their 145th season overall. The Argonauts finished the season in first place in the East Division and finished with a 9–9 record.

The Argonauts improved upon their 5–13 record from 2016 with their sixth win after 13 games and clinched a playoff spot following a Hamilton Tiger-Cats loss on October 13, 2017. The team hosted their first playoff game since 2013, in which they defeated the crossover Saskatchewan Roughriders in the East Final by a score of 25–21. The Argonauts made their 23rd appearance in the Grey Cup championship game and won for the 17th time in the 105th Grey Cup game in Ottawa against the league-leading Calgary Stampeders by a score of 27–24. It was the third largest fourth-quarter comeback in Grey Cup history (eight-point deficit) and the Argos became the first team in Grey Cup history with two touchdowns of 100-plus yards.

With the 2018 Toronto Argonauts team failing to qualify for the playoffs, the 2017 Argonauts became the first championship team since the 1970 Montreal Alouettes to miss the playoffs in both the preceding and following years.

Going back to the beginning of the year, it was announced on February 28, 2017 that Jim Popp would assume the duties of general manager and Marc Trestman would take on head coaching duties. The end result, as noted above, was a stark contrast to their 2016 season, with people calling for the dismissal for Jim Barker and Scott Milanovich toward the latter portions of the 2016 Toronto Argonauts season.

== Offseason ==
=== CFL draft ===
The 2017 CFL draft took place on May 7, 2017. The Argonauts had six selections in the eight-round draft after trading the first overall pick for Drew Willy and their sixth-round pick for S. J. Green.

Round	Pick	Player	Position	School/Club team	Hometown
2	10	Mason Woods	OL	Idaho	Port Coquitlam, BC
3	19	Evan Foster	DL	Manitoba	Chilliwack, BC
4	27	Robert Woodson	DB	Calgary	Calgary, AB
5	36	Nakas Onyeka	LB	Wilfrid Laurier	Brampton, ON
7	54	Justin Herdman	LB	Simon Fraser	Winnipeg, MB
8	63	Matthew Carson	DL	Calgary	Calgary, AB

== Preseason ==
The Toronto Argonauts won their first preseason game with a dominant defensive performance, returning two Montreal interceptions for touchdowns in the game. In the second preseason game, this time on the road, the Argos came back to win against their hated rivals Hamilton – while notably not giving any game reps to Grey Cup-winning quarterbacks Ricky Ray or Drew Willy.

Week	Date	Kickoff	Opponent	Results		TV	Venue	Attendance	Summary
Week	Date	Kickoff	Opponent	Score	Record	TV	Venue	Attendance	Summary
A	Thurs, June 8	7:30 p.m. EDT	vs. Montreal Alouettes	W 24–20	1–0	None	BMO Field	5,532	Recap
B	Fri, June 16	7:30 p.m. EDT	at Hamilton Tiger-Cats	W 23–16	2–0	Ticats.ca	Tim Hortons Field		Recap

# Games played with colour uniforms.

== Regular season ==
=== Standings ===
East Division
Team	GP	W	L	T	Pts	PF	PA	Div	Stk	
Toronto Argonauts	18	9	9	0	18	482	456	6–2	W2	Details
Ottawa Redblacks	18	8	9	1	17	495	452	5–3	W3	Details
Hamilton Tiger-Cats	18	6	12	0	12	443	545	4–4	W1	Details
Montreal Alouettes	18	3	15	0	6	314	580	1–7	L11	Details

=== Schedule ===
Week	Date	Kickoff	Opponent	Results		TV	Venue	Attendance	Summary
Week	Date	Kickoff	Opponent	Score	Record	TV	Venue	Attendance	Summary
1	Sun, June 25	4:00 p.m. EDT	Hamilton Tiger-Cats	W 32–15	1–0	TSN/ESPN2	BMO Field	13,583	Recap
2	Fri, June 30	7:00 p.m. EDT	BC Lions	L 15–28	1–1	TSN/ESPN2	BMO Field	11,219	Recap
3	Sat, July 8	7:00 p.m. EDT	@ Ottawa Redblacks	W 26–25	2–1	TSN/RDS	TD Place Stadium	24,347	Recap
4	Thurs, July 13	8:30 p.m. EDT	@ Winnipeg Blue Bombers	L 25–33	2–2	TSN/RDS	Investors Group Field	25,085	Recap
5	Mon, July 24	7:30 p.m. EDT	Ottawa Redblacks	W 27–24	3–2	TSN/RDS/ESPN2	BMO Field	15,801	Recap
6	Sat, July 29	6:30 p.m. EDT	@ Saskatchewan Roughriders	L 27–38	3–3	TSN	Mosaic Stadium	33,350	Recap
7	Thurs, Aug 3	7:30 p.m. EDT	Calgary Stampeders	L 24–41	3–4	TSN	BMO Field	11,616	Recap
8	Fri, Aug 11	7:30 p.m. EDT	@ Montreal Alouettes	L 9–21	3–5	TSN/RDS	Molson Stadium	19,712	Recap
9	Sat, Aug 19	4:00 p.m. EDT	Montreal Alouettes	W 38–6	4–5	TSN/RDS	BMO Field	16,326	Recap
10	Sat, Aug 26	9:00 p.m. EDT	@ Calgary Stampeders	L 7–23	4–6	TSN	McMahon Stadium	26,150	Recap
11	Mon, Sept 4	6:30 p.m. EDT	@ Hamilton Tiger-Cats	L 22–24	4–7	TSN	Tim Hortons Field	23,926	Recap
12	Bye								
13	Sat, Sept 16	4:00 p.m. EDT	Edmonton Eskimos	W 34–26	5–7	TSN	BMO Field	13,182	Recap
14	Sat, Sept 23	7:00 p.m. EDT	Montreal Alouettes	W 33–19	6–7	TSN/RDS	BMO Field	12,862	Recap
15	Sat, Sept 30	6:30 p.m. EDT	@ Hamilton Tiger-Cats	W 43–35 (OT)	7–7	TSN/RDS2	Tim Hortons Field	24,067	Recap
16	Sat, Oct 7	4:00 p.m. EDT	Saskatchewan Roughriders	L 24–27	7–8	TSN/RDS2	BMO Field	15,102	Recap
17	Sat, Oct 14	7:00 p.m. EDT	@ Edmonton Eskimos	L 27–30	7–9	TSN/RDS2	Commonwealth Stadium	26,738	Recap
18	Sat, Oct 21	4:00 p.m. EDT	Winnipeg Blue Bombers	W 29–28	8–9	TSN/RDS	BMO Field	15,532	Recap
19	Bye								
20	Sat, Nov 4	10:00 p.m. EDT	@ BC Lions	W 40–13	9–9	TSN	BC Place	19,233	Recap

# Games played with colour uniforms.
# Games played with white uniforms.

== Post-season ==
=== Schedule ===
Game	Date	Kickoff	Opponent	Results		TV	Venue	Attendance	Summary
Game	Date	Kickoff	Opponent	Score	Record	TV	Venue	Attendance	Summary
East Semi-Final	Bye								
East Final	Sun, Nov 19	1:00 p.m. EST	Saskatchewan Roughriders	W 25–21	1–0	TSN/RDS/ESPNews	BMO Field	24,929	Recap
[[105th Grey Cup]]	Sun, Nov 26	6:30 p.m. EST	Calgary Stampeders	W 27–24	2–0	TSN/RDS/ESPN2	TD Place Stadium	36,154	Recap

# Games played with colour uniforms.

== Roster ==
2017 Toronto Argonauts final roster
Quarterbacks: 14 McLeod Bethel-Thompson; 17 Cody Fajardo; 7 Jeff Mathews; 15 Ricky Ray; Running backs: 38 Declan Cross; 30 Martese Jackson; 32 James Wilder Jr.; Receivers: 1 Anthony Coombs; 10 Armanti Edwards; 19 S. J. Green; 84 Llevi Noel; 85 DeVier Posey; 88 Jimmy Ralph; 82 Malcolm Williams	Offensive linemen: 69 William Campbell T; 57 Tyler Holmes G; 68 Chris Kolankowski C; 61 Sean McEwen C; 54 Chris Van Zeyl T; 59 Brandon Washington T/G; 56 Corey Watman G; Defensive linemen: 94 Victor Butler DE; 49 Jeff Finley DT; 93 Linden Gaydosh DT; 90 Cleyon Laing DT; 40 Shawn Lemon DE; 91 Justin Tuggle DE; 75 Cameron Walker DE; 98 Dylan Wynn DT	Linebackers: 6 Marcus Ball; 28 Akeem Jordan; 41 Nakas Onyeka; 47 Terrance Plummer; 48 Bear Woods; Defensive backs: 39 Matt Black; 21 Qudarius Ford; 5 Jermaine Gabriel; 20 Rico Murray; 9 Akwasi Owusu-Ansah; 0 Johnny Sears; 26 Cassius Vaughn; 25 Matt Webster; 12 Mitchell White; 23 Robert Woodson	Special teams: 70 Lirim Hajrullahu K/P; 58 Jake Reinhart LS; Practice roster: 43 Evan Foster DE; 96 Jeff Luc DT; 27 Cam McDaniel RB; 45 Curtis Newton LB; 65 D. J. Sackey G; 95 Sadat Sulleyman DE; 18 Brian Tyms WR	Injured list: 44 Khalil Bass LB; 97 Ken Bishop DT; 67 Jamal Campbell T; 91 Alan-Michael Cash DT; 11 Alex Charette WR; 33 Alden Darby DB; 92 Troy Davis DE; 64 J'Michael Deane G; 8 Jeff Fuller WR; 4 Brandon Harris DB; 52 Justin Herdman LB; 16 Brian Jones SB; 29 Josh Mitchell DB; 00 Ronnie Pfeffer K/P; 2 Dakota Prukop QB; 99 Daryl Waud DT; 3 Brandon Whitaker RB; 63 Mason Woods T; Italics indicate international player

== Coaching staff ==
Toronto Argonauts staff
Front office and support staff: Owner – Larry Tanenbaum / Bell Media; President and ceo – Michael Copeland; Special advisor – Michael Clemons; General manager – Jim Popp; Director of football operations – Ian Sanderson; Director of player personnel – Chris Rukavina; US scouting coordinator – Spencer Zimmerman; Director canadian scouting – Vince Magri; Consultant, Football Operations – Nick Volpe; Equipment manager – Danny Webb; Assistant equipment manager – Tom Bryce; Head athletic therapist – Scott Shannon; Assistant athletic therapist – Josh Shewell	Head coaches: Head coach – Marc Trestman; Assistant head coach – Corey Chamblin; Offensive coaches: Offensive coordinator – Marcus Brady; Running backs – Josh Moore; Receivers – Tommy Condell; Offensive line – Mitch Browning; Senior assistant – Steve Walsh; Defensive coaches: Defensive coordinator/defensive backs – Corey Chamblin; Defensive line – Kerry Locklin; Linebackers – Mike Archer; Assistant defensive backs – Tyron Brackenridge; Defensive quality control – Gavin Lake; Special teams coaches: Special teams coordinator – Kevin Eiben; Assistant special teams – Wendell Avery; → Coaching staff
