= Llevi Noel =

Canadian gridiron football player (born 1991)

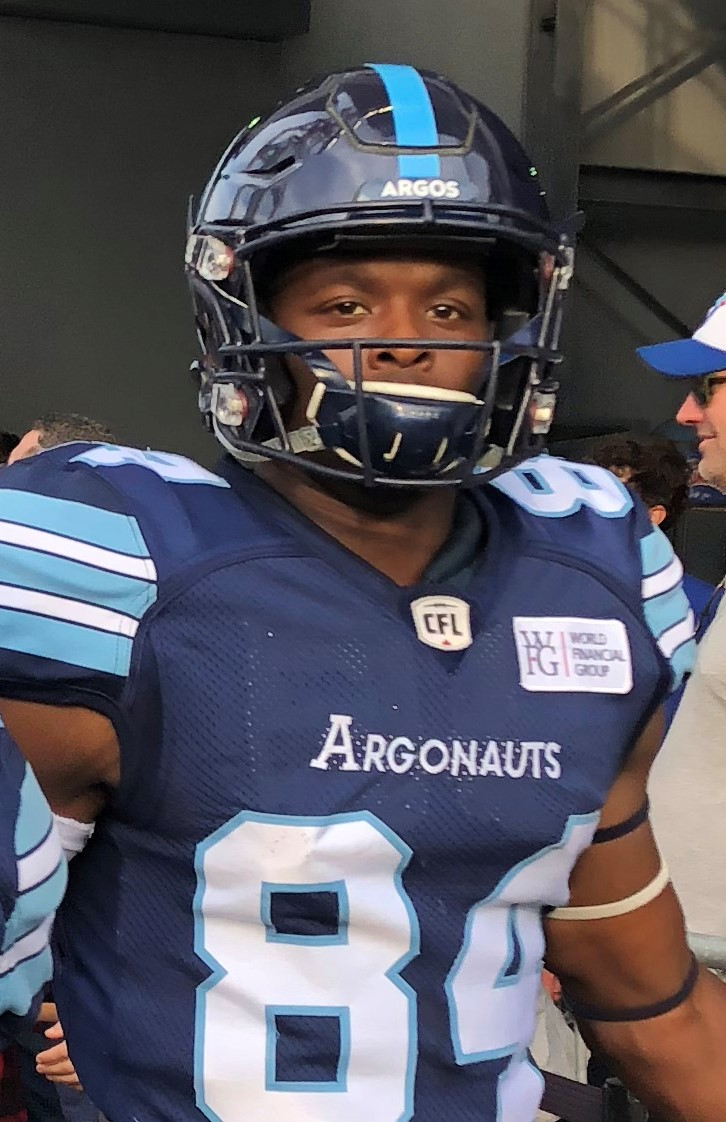
- Noel with the Toronto Argonauts in 2018

No. 84
- Position: Wide receiver

Personal information
- Born: July 15, 1991 (age 35); Toronto, Ontario, Canada
- Listed height: 6 ft 2 in (1.88 m)
- Listed weight: 210 lb (95 kg)

Career information
- High school: Western Tech
- CJFL: Windsor AKO Fratmen
- University: Toronto Varsity Blues
- CFL draft: 2016: 4th round, 31st overall pick

Career history
- 2016–2021: Toronto Argonauts
- 2022: Ottawa Redblacks
- 2022: Edmonton Elks
- 2023: Hamilton Tiger-Cats*
- * Offseason or practice squad member only

Awards and highlights
- Grey Cup champion (2017)
- Stats at CFL.ca

Llevi Noel (born July 15, 1991) is a Canadian former professional football wide receiver. He is a Grey Cup champion after winning the 105th Grey Cup with the Toronto Argonauts in 2017. Noel was a member of four different teams in the Canadian Football League (CFL), the Toronto Argonauts, Ottawa Redblacks, Edmonton Elks and Hamilton Tiger-Cats.

== Early career ==
=== Toronto Varsity Blues ===
Noel played Canadian Interuniversity Sport (CIS) football with the Toronto Varsity Blues from 2013 to 2014. In 2014, he played in six games and had 49 receptions for 758 yards and four touchdowns en route to being named an OUA first team all-star and CIS second team all-Canadian. He had a career-high 200 receiving yards against the Carleton Ravens in the 1000th game in the Varsity Blues' program history.

=== Windsor AKO Fratmen ===
After losing interest with academics in the CIS, Noel played for the Windsor AKO Fratmen of the Canadian Junior Football League in 2015. That year, he recorded 25 receptions for 398 yards and six touchdowns while also returning three kickoffs for 164 yards and one touchdown and five punts for 110 yards.

== Professional career ==
=== Toronto Argonauts ===
In the final CFL Scouting Bureau Rankings, Noel was named the 19th best available player in the 2016 CFL draft. He was eventually drafted in the fourth round, 31st overall, by the Toronto Argonauts in the 2016 draft and signed with the team on May 24, 2016. He made the active roster following training camp that year and played in his first professional game on June 23, 2016 against the Hamilton Tiger-Cats. He recorded his first career reception on August 12, 2016 in a game against the Winnipeg Blue Bombers and scored his first career touchdown on the next play on a 34-yard pass from Cody Fajardo. Following the release of fellow receivers Tori Gurley, Kevin Elliott, Vidal Hazelton and Phil Bates, Noel made his first career start at receiver on October 10, 2016 against the Calgary Stampeders where he had one reception. In his rookie year, he had three receptions for 54 yards and one touchdown while playing in all 18 regular season games. He also played on special teams, recording 19 special teams tackles and 14 kickoff returns for 283 yards.

In his sophomore season, Noel primarily saw playing time on special teams as he led the team with 27 special teams tackles and finished second in the league overall. He played in all 18 regular season games again and otherwise had just one reception that was a seven-yard touchdown catch. The Argonauts qualified for the playoffs this year and Noel played in both games, including his first appearance in a Grey Cup. In the 105th Grey Cup game, he set an Argonaut team record with five special teams tackles in a Grey Cup game as Noel won his first championship in an Argonaut victory over the Calgary Stampeders.

On January 10, 2018, it was announced that Noel had signed an extension through to the 2019 season. For the 2018 season, Noel became a regular fixture on the offence as he played in all 18 regular season games and had a career-high 47 catches for 512 yards and one touchdown. He continued to play on special teams and recorded 11 special teams tackles. On July 21, 2018, he also recovered a fumble from Winnipeg's punt returner, Kevin Fogg, and returned it 49 yards for his first fumble return touchdown. He also recorded his first career rushing attempt this year with a two-yard carry against the Saskatchewan Roughriders on September 22, 2018.

In 2019, Noel started the year with 23 catches for 209 yards and one touchdown in five games. However, he was injured in the sixth game and missed the first games of his career when he was placed on the six-game injured list following a July 25, 2020 loss to the Edmonton Eskimos. He returned after only a two-game absence, but was reduced to only six catches for 50 yards in the remaining 10 regular season games of the season. He again had a presence on special teams as he notched 21 special teams tackles in 16 games, which was the fifth-highest in the league. For the third time in his four seasons, the Argonauts failed to qualify for the playoffs.

On February 10, 2020, Noel signed a one-year contract extension with the Argonauts. However, the 2020 CFL season was cancelled due to the COVID-19 pandemic in Canada, so he re-signed with the team on December 11, 2020 to stay with the Argonauts for the 2021 season. However, he sat out the entire year due to injury and became a free agent upon the expiry of his contract on February 8, 2022.

=== Ottawa Redblacks ===
On February 8, 2022, it was announced that Noel had signed with the Ottawa Redblacks. He dressed in six games for the Redblacks, but did not record any statistics.

=== Edmonton Elks ===
On July 25, 2022, it was announced that Noel had been traded to the Edmonton Elks. He became a free agent upon the expiry of his contract on February 14, 2023.

=== Hamilton Tiger-Cats ===
On February 15, 2023, it was announced that Noel had signed with the Hamilton Tiger-Cats. On May 14, 2023 the Ti-Cats placed Noel on the retired list.
