= Alex Charette =

Canadian gridiron football player (born 1992)

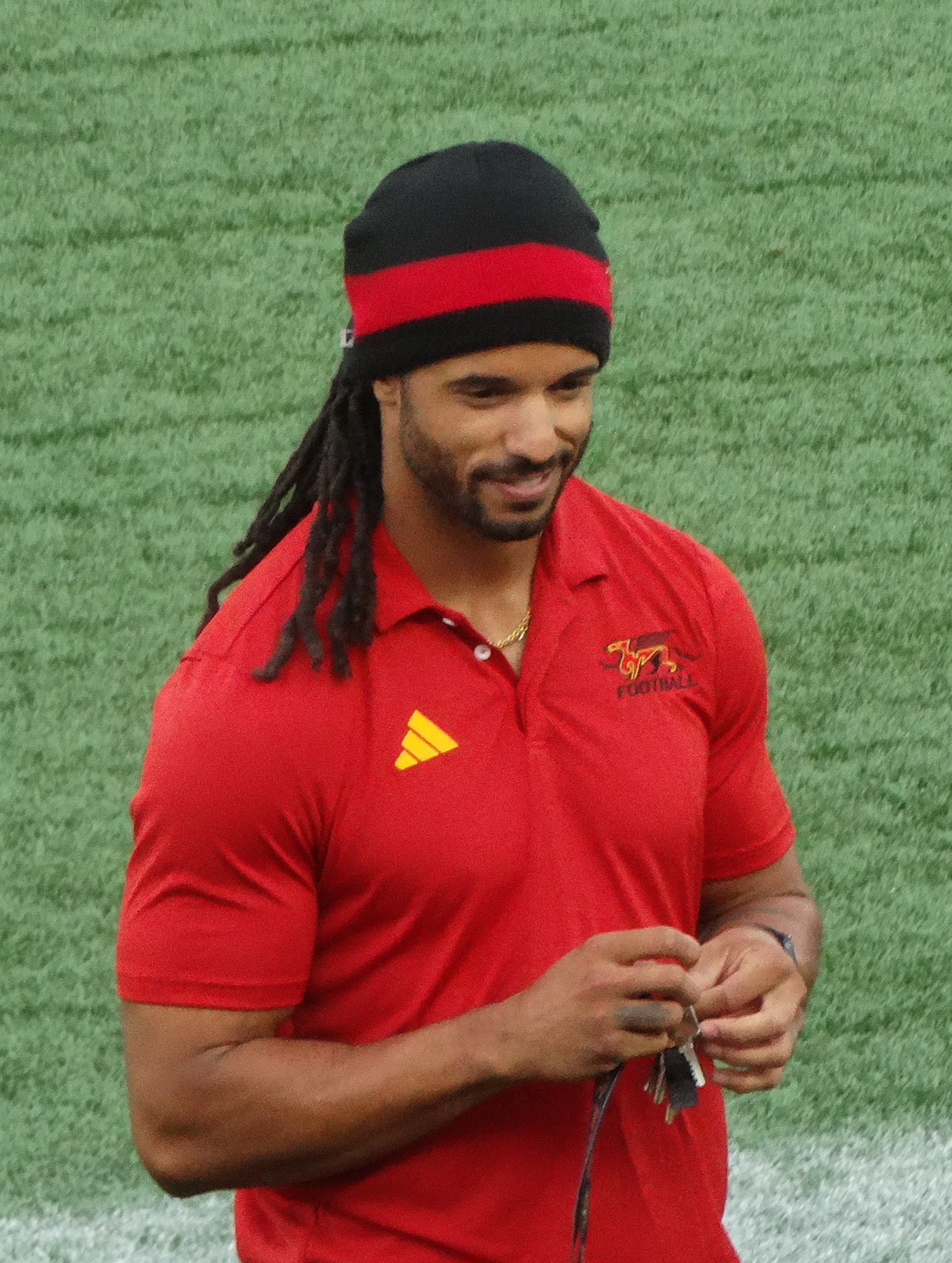
- Charette with the Guelph Gryphons in 2024

Guelph Gryphons
- Title: Receivers coach/Strength and conditioning coach

Personal information
- Born: January 9, 1992 (age 34); St. Catharines, Ontario, Canada
- Listed height: 6 ft 1 in (1.85 m)
- Listed weight: 200 lb (91 kg)

Career information
- Position: Wide receiver (No. 11)
- University: Guelph
- CFL draft: 2015: 4th round, 36th overall pick

Career history

Playing
- 2015–2017: Montreal Alouettes
- 2017–2019: Toronto Argonauts
- 2020: Edmonton Eskimos*
- 2021: Montreal Alouettes
- * Offseason or practice squad member only

Coaching
- 2023–present: Guelph Gryphons (Receivers coach)

Awards and highlights
- Grey Cup champion (2017)
- Stats at CFL.ca

Alex Charette (born January 9, 1992) is a Canadian former professional football wide receiver and is the receivers coach and strength and conditioning coach for the Guelph Gryphons. He was a member of the 105th Grey Cup champion Toronto Argonauts.

== Early life ==
Charette started his football career at Saint Francis Catholic Secondary School in St. Catharines, Ontario and went on to become the first Phoenix graduate to be drafted to a professional sports team. In addition to playing for his high school he played in the Ontario Varsity Football League (OVFL) for the Niagara Spears from 2005 to 2009.

== University career ==
Charette played Canadian Interuniversity Sport (CIS) football with the Guelph Gryphons from 2011 to 2014. He played in 34 games where he recorded 109 receptions for 1,296 yards and nine touchdowns.

== Professional career ==
=== Montreal Alouettes (first stint) ===
Charette was drafted in the fourth round, 36th overall by the Montreal Alouettes in the 2015 CFL draft and signed a four-year contract on May 25, 2015. He played in 27 games with the team where he recorded 24 receptions for 208 yards and ten special teams tackles before being released shortly into his third season on June 26, 2017.

=== Toronto Argonauts ===
Charette signed with the Toronto Argonauts on August 7, 2017 and played in five games with the team while being on the injured list during their 105th Grey Cup victory. He played in 37 games over three seasons with the Argonauts and was released on February 5, 2020.

=== Edmonton Eskimos ===
Charette signed with Edmonton on February 11, 2020, but following the cancelled 2020 CFL season, he was released on January 9, 2021.

=== Montreal Alouettes (second stint) ===
On August 6, 2021, it was announced that Charette had signed with the Montreal Alouettes. He was released shortly after on August 17, 2021.

== Coaching career ==
In August 2023, Charette joined the Guelph Gryphons as the team's strength and conditioning coach and receivers coach.
