= Robert Woodson (Canadian football) =

Canadian football player (born 1995)

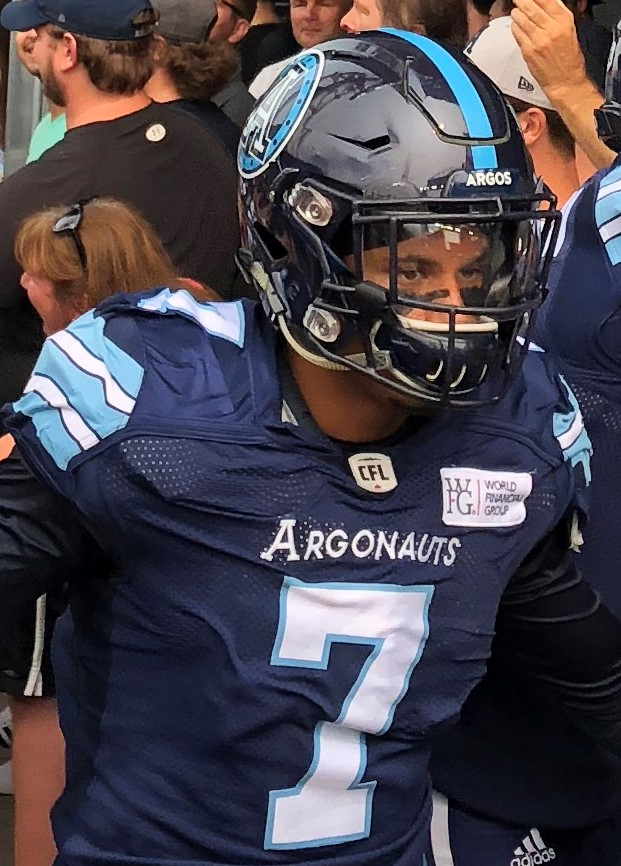
- Woodson with the Toronto Argonauts in 2018

No. 7
- Position: Defensive back

Personal information
- Born: October 4, 1995 (age 31); Calgary, Alberta, Canada
- Listed height: 5 ft 10 in (1.78 m)
- Listed weight: 191 lb (87 kg)

Career information
- High school: Saint Francis High
- University: Calgary
- CFL draft: 2017: 4th round, 27th overall pick

Career history
- 2017–2021: Toronto Argonauts

Awards and highlights
- 105th Grey Cup champion (2017)
- Stats at CFL.ca

Robert Woodson (born October 4, 1995) is a Canadian former professional football defensive back who played for the Toronto Argonauts of the Canadian Football League (CFL). He played U Sports football with the Calgary Dinos from 2013 to 2016.

== Professional career ==
Pre-draft measurables
Height	Weight	40-yard dash	20-yard shuttle	Three-cone drill	Vertical jump	Broad jump	Bench press
5 ft 10 1/4 in (1.78 m)	191 lb (87 kg)	4.64 s	4.39 s	7.03 s	35.0 in (0.89 m)	10 ft 0 1/2 in (3.06 m)	18 reps
All values from CFL Combine

Woodson was drafted by the Argonauts 27th overall in the 2017 CFL draft and signed a two-year contract with the club on May 22, 2017. He made the active roster following training camp and played in his first professional regular season game on June 25, 2017, against the Hamilton Tiger-Cats where he recorded four defensive tackles. For the 2017 season, he played in 12 regular season games and had eight defensive tackles and seven special teams tackles. He also played in both post-season games that year and played in his first Grey Cup game while in his rookie year. He won his first championship following the Argonauts' 105th Grey Cup win over the Calgary Stampeders where he posted two special teams tackles in the game.

In 2018, Woodson had two stints on the injured list, but managed to play in 14 regular season games where he recorded eight defensive tackles and nine special teams tackles. He earned his first professional start on September 8, 2018, in a game against the Tiger-Cats in the Labour Day rematch. The Argonauts did not qualify for the playoffs in 2018.

Scheduled to become a free agent in 2019, Woodson opted to re-sign with the Argonauts on January 29, 2019, to another two-year contract. He played in 15 regular season games, and started eight, spending time at cornerback, halfback, and safety. He had a career-high 24 defensive tackles, seven special teams tackles, and two forced fumbles.

Woodson re-signed with the Argonauts on February 6, 2021. He was placed on the suspended list on July 10, 2021.

== Personal life ==
Woodson's older brother, Anthony Woodson, also played in the CFL over six years for the Winnipeg Blue Bombers, Argonauts, Hamilton Tiger-Cats, and Calgary Stampeders. The two were on opposite sides in the 105th Grey Cup game while Anthony played for the Stampeders.
