= Jamal Campbell =

Canadian gridirion football player (born 1993)

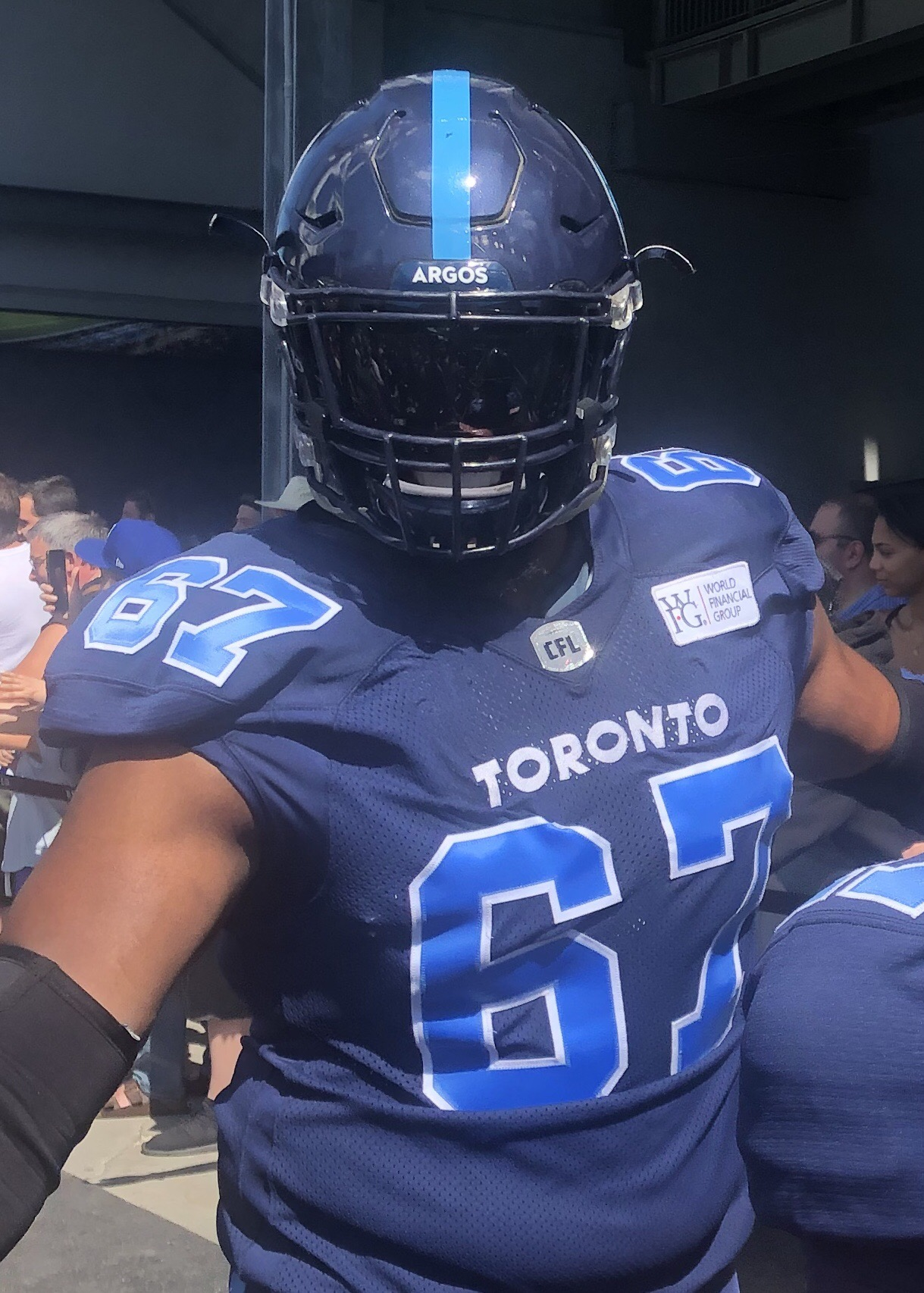
- Campbell with the Toronto Argonauts in 2019

Profile
- Position: Offensive lineman

Personal information
- Born: October 15, 1993 (age 33); Toronto, Ontario, Canada
- Listed height: 6 ft 7 in (2.01 m)
- Listed weight: 300 lb (136 kg)

Career information
- High school: C. W. Jefferys
- University: York
- CFL draft: 2016: 3rd round, 22nd overall pick

Career history
- 2016–2021: Toronto Argonauts
- 2022: Saskatchewan Roughriders
- 2023: Calgary Stampeders

Awards and highlights
- Grey Cup champion (2017)
- Stats at CFL.ca

Jamal Campbell (born October 15, 1993) is a Canadian professional football offensive lineman. He won his first Grey Cup championship in 2017 with the Toronto Argonauts.

== University career ==
Campbell played CIS football for the York Lions from 2012 to 2015.

== Professional career ==
=== Toronto Argonauts ===
Campbell was drafted by the Toronto Argonauts in the third round, 22nd overall, in the 2016 CFL draft and signed with the club on May 24, 2016. He made the team out of training camp and played in eight games in his rookie year in 2016. In 2017, he dressed as a backup offensive lineman for the team's first 15 games of the regular season before being placed of the Argonauts' injured list. Despite not playing in the 105th Grey Cup, Campbell was part of his team's championship as he won the first Grey Cup of his career. He played in eight games in 2018.

Campbell began the 2019 season as a back-up offensive linemen. While lined up as a tight end, he scored his first career professional touchdown on a one-yard reception from McLeod Bethel-Thompson on August 1, 2019. After spending those first seven games as a reserve, he got his first start of the season at right tackle on August 16, 2019 and started every other game of the season there. As a pending free agent, Campbell signed a three-year contract with the Argonauts on February 3, 2020. However, he did not play in 2020 due to the cancellation of the 2020 CFL season and he re-structured his contract with the Argonauts on January 31, 2021. He played in nine games in 2021 before becoming injured and sitting out the rest of the season. In a salary cap related move, he was released by the Argonauts on March 17, 2022.

=== Saskatchewan Roughriders ===
On March 17, 2022, it was announced that Campbell had signed with the Saskatchewan Roughriders. He played in 12 regular season games and made two starts in 2022. He later became a free agent upon the expiry of his contract on February 14, 2023.

=== Calgary Stampeders ===
On February 23, 2023, it was announced that Campbell had signed with the Calgary Stampeders. He played in 13 regular season games as a backup offensive lineman in 2023. In the offseason, he became a free agent upon the expiry of his contract on February 13, 2024.
