= D. J. Sackey =

Canadian gridiron football player and coach (born 1993)

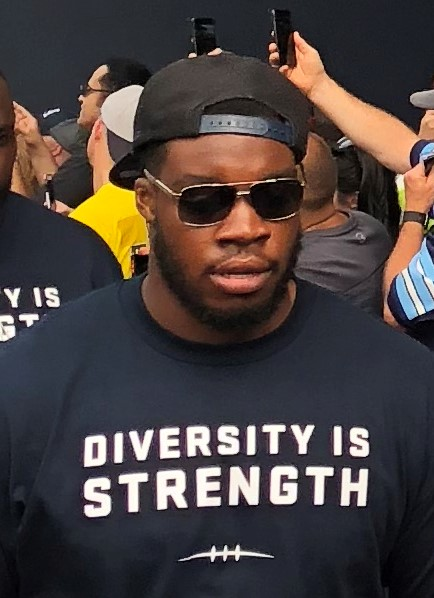
- Sackey with the Toronto Argonauts in 2018

York Lions
- Title: Offensive line coach
- CFL status: National

Personal information
- Born: September 6, 1993 (age 33); Toronto, Ontario, Canada
- Listed height: 6 ft 5 in (1.96 m)
- Listed weight: 300 lb (136 kg)

Career information
- High school: St. Francis Xavier
- University: Toronto
- CFL draft: 2016: 2nd round, 13th overall pick

Career history

Playing
- 2016–2019: Toronto Argonauts
- 2019: Ottawa Redblacks*
- 2019: Edmonton Eskimos*
- * Offseason or practice squad member only

Coaching
- 2023–present: York Lions; Offensive line coach

Career CFL statistics
- Games played: 12
- Games started: 0
- Stats at CFL.ca

David Junior Sackey (born September 6, 1993) is a Canadian former professional football offensive lineman and the current offensive line coach for the York Lions of U Sports football. He played in the Canadian Football League (CFL) for four seasons and won a Grey Cup championship in 2017 with the Toronto Argonauts. He played CIS football for the Toronto Varsity Blues from 2012 to 2015.

== High school ==
Sackey played high school football at St. Francis Xavier Secondary School where he was once named defensive lineman of the year and most improved player.

== Professional career ==
=== Toronto Argonauts ===
Sackey was drafted by the Toronto Argonauts in the second round, 12th overall, in the 2016 CFL draft and signed with the club on May 24, 2016. He played in six games in his rookie year in 2016 and dressed in his first CFL game on July 31, 2016 against the Ottawa Redblacks. In 2017, he spent the regular season and playoffs on the Argos practice roster. The Argos went on to win the 105th Grey Cup. On January 10, 2018, Sackey was re-signed by the Argos to a two-year contract. He dressed in a total of 13 games with the Argonauts and was released part way through the 2019 season on August 14, 2019.

=== Ottawa Redblacks ===
On August 20, 2019, it was announced that Sackey had agreed to a practice roster agreement with the Ottawa Redblacks. He was released on October 7, 2019.

=== Edmonton Eskimos ===
On November 5, 2019, Sackey signed a practice roster agreement with the Edmonton Eskimos. His contract expired at the end of the year.

== Coaching career ==
On August 22, 2023, it was announced that Sackey had joined the York Lions football team as their offensive line coach.
