= Alden Darby =

American gridiron football player (born 1992)

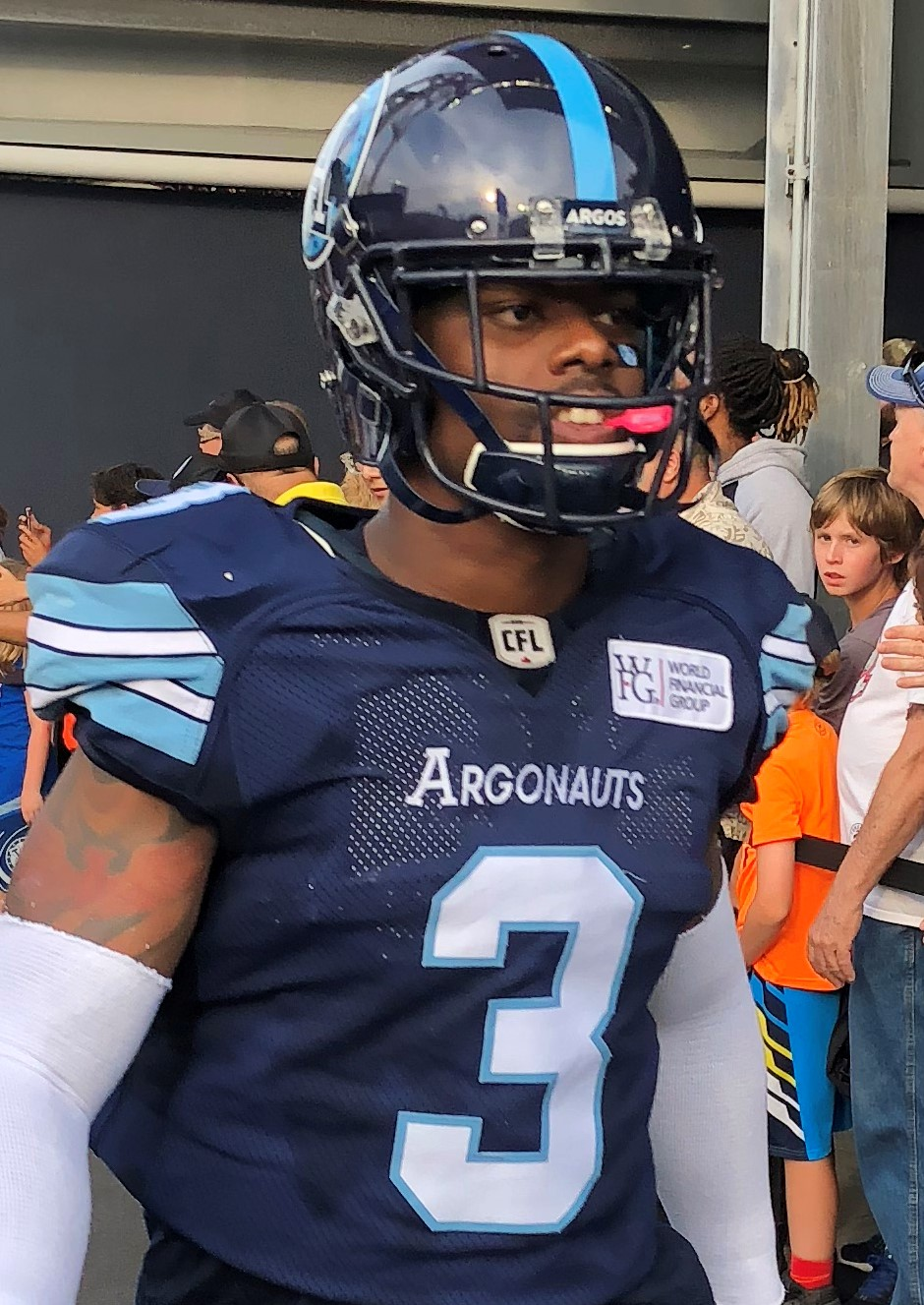
- Darby with the Toronto Argonauts in 2018

Profile
- Position: Defensive back

Personal information
- Born: June 22, 1992 (age 34); Long Beach, California, U.S.
- Listed height: 5 ft 11 in (1.80 m)
- Listed weight: 192 lb (87 kg)

Career information
- High school: Millikan (CA)
- College: Arizona State
- NFL draft: 2014: undrafted

Career history
- San Diego Chargers (2014)*; Pittsburgh Steelers (2015)*; New Orleans Saints (2015–2016)*; Indianapolis Colts (2016)*; Toronto Argonauts (2017–2020); Winnipeg Blue Bombers (2021); Hamilton Tiger-Cats (2022); Winnipeg Blue Bombers (2022–2023)
- * Offseason or practice squad member only

Awards and highlights
- 2× Grey Cup champion (2017, 2021); CFL West All-Star (2021); First-team All-Pac-12 (2013); Second-team All-Pac-12 (2012)
- Stats at Pro Football Reference
- Stats at CFL.ca

Alden Darby Jr. (born June 22, 1992) is an American former professional football defensive back. He played college football at Arizona State.

== College career ==
Darby played for the Arizona State Sun Devils from 2010 to 2013.

== Professional career ==
Pre-draft measurables
| Height | Weight | 40-yard dash | 10-yard split | 20-yard split | 20-yard shuttle | Three-cone drill | Vertical jump | Broad jump |
|---|---|---|---|---|---|---|---|---|
| 5 ft 10 in (1.78 m) | 194 lb (88 kg) | 4.65 s | 1.69 s | 2.68 s | 4.32 s | 6.97 s | 34 1/2 in (0.88 m) | 10 ft 1 in (3.07 m) |
All values from Arizona State Pro Day

=== San Diego Chargers ===
Darby signed with the San Diego Chargers after going undrafted in the 2014 NFL draft. On August 30, 2014, he was released by the Chargers.

=== Pittsburgh Steelers ===
Darby signed with the Pittsburgh Steelers. He was released on September 5, 2015.

=== New Orleans Saints ===
Darby signed with the New Orleans Saints. On August 4, 2016, Darby was placed on injured reserve. On August 7, 2016, he was released by the Saints with an injury settlement.

=== Indianapolis Colts ===
On August 17, 2016, Darby signed with the Indianapolis Colts. On August 28, 2016, Darby was waived by the Colts, but was re-signed two days later. On September 3, 2016, he was waived by the Colts as part of final roster cuts.

=== Toronto Argonauts ===
On July 16, 2017, Darby was signed to the practice roster of the Toronto Argonauts of the Canadian Football League. He played in eight regular season games with the Argonauts in 2017 where he had 18 defensive tackles and one interception that he returned 75 yards for his first career touchdown. He was on the injured list when the team won the 105th Grey Cup. He re-signed with the Argonauts on January 25, 2021.

=== Winnipeg Blue Bombers (first stint) ===
On July 19, 2021, Darby was traded to the Winnipeg Blue Bombers in exchange for offensive lineman Terry Poole. He played in 11 regular season games where he had 34 defensive tackles and was named a CFL West All-Star. He finished the season as a Grey Cup champion as the Blue Bombers won the 108th Grey Cup. He became a free agent upon the expiry of his contract on February 8, 2022.

=== Hamilton Tiger-Cats ===
Darby signed with the Hamilton Tiger-Cats as a free agent on February 10, 2022, after initially verbally agreeing to join the Ottawa Redblacks. He played in ten games where he recorded 23 tackles, one sack, and one interception.

=== Winnipeg Blue Bombers (second stint) ===
On October 4, 2022, the day before the trade deadline, Darby was traded to the Winnipeg Blue Bombers in exchange for Cedric Wilcots. He played in two regular season games where he recorded six defensive tackles. He also played in the West Final playoff and the 109th Grey Cup game, where he recorded three defensive tackles, but the Blue Bombers lost to the Toronto Argonauts.

In 2023, Darby played in 11 regular season games, starting in six, where he recorded 20 defensive tackles and three special teams tackles. He sustained an injury mid-season as was placed on the six-game injured list on September 2, 2023, and did not play again that season. He became a free agent upon the expiry of his contract on February 13, 2024.

On June 6, 2024, Darby announced his retirement via X (Twitter).
