= Jake Reinhart (Canadian football) =

Canadian gridiron football player (born 1989)

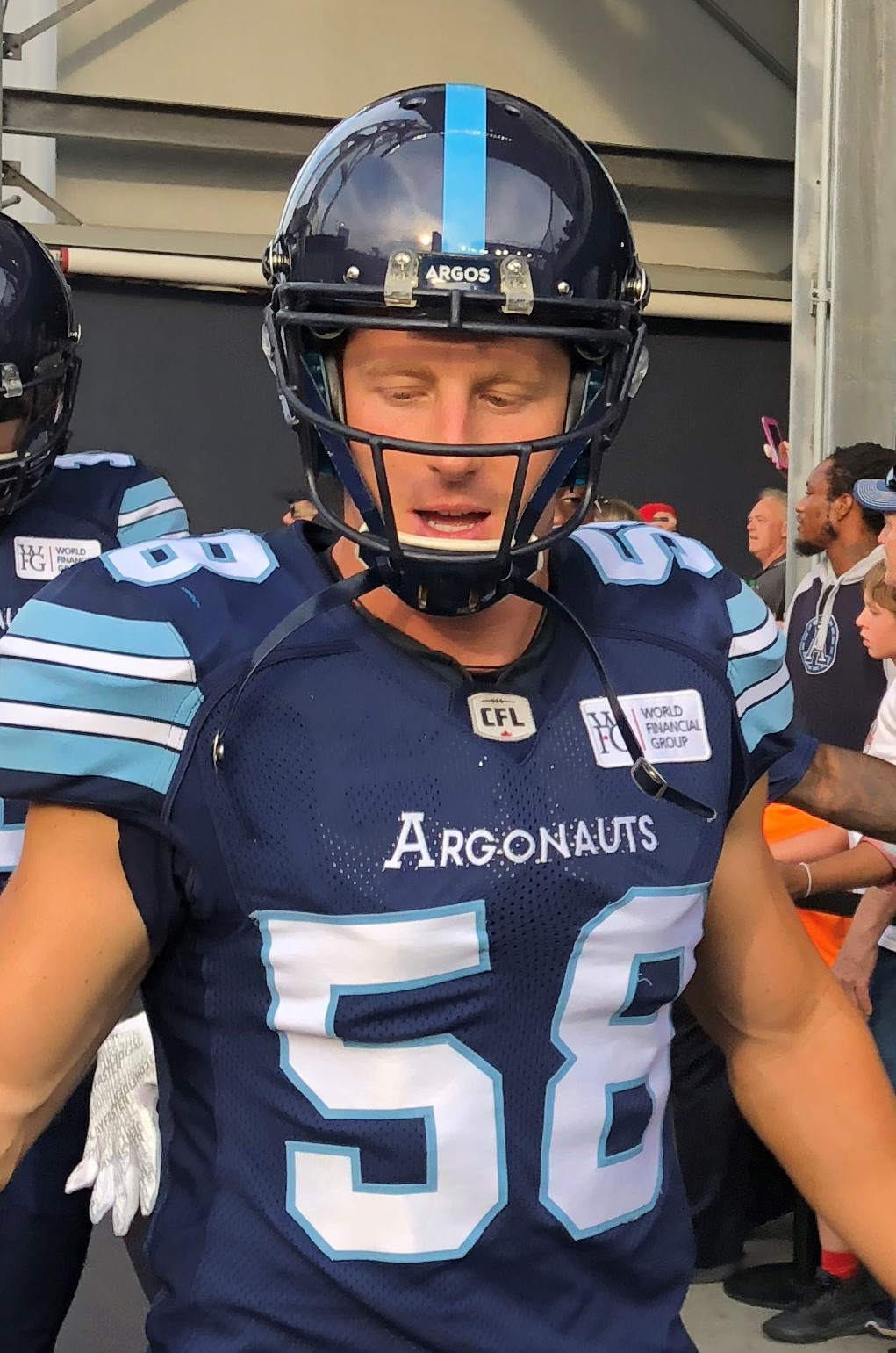
- Reinhart with the Toronto Argonauts in 2018

No. 58
- Position: Long snapper

Personal information
- Born: November 25, 1989 (age 36); Guelph, Ontario, Canada
- Listed height: 6 ft 0 in (1.83 m)
- Listed weight: 220 lb (100 kg)

Career information
- High school: Guelph Collegiate
- University: Guelph
- CFL draft: 2012: undrafted

Career history
- 2013: Toronto Argonauts*
- 2014–2022: Toronto Argonauts
- * Offseason or practice squad member only

Awards and highlights
- Grey Cup champion (2017)
- Stats at CFL.ca

Jake Reinhart (born November 25, 1989) is a Canadian former professional football long snapper who played in eight seasons for the Toronto Argonauts of the Canadian Football League (CFL). He is a Grey Cup champion after playing in the Argonauts' 105th Grey Cup victory.

== University career ==
Reinhart played CIS football as a linebacker and long snapper for the Guelph Gryphons from 2008 to 2012. He was named a CIS Academic All-Canadian in 2012.

== Professional career ==
After going undrafted in the 2012 CFL draft, Reinhart returned to play for the Guelph Gryphons in 2012. After completing his CIS eligibility, he was then signed as an undrafted free agent by the Toronto Argonauts on June 4, 2013. However, he was released after the team's first pre-season game on June 16, 2013.

Following the departure of the Argonauts' incumbent long snapper, Chad Rempel, Reinhart was re-signed by the team on April 15, 2014. He earned the long snapper job following training camp and played in his first professional game on June 26, 2014 against the Winnipeg Blue Bombers. He played in all 18 regular season games that year and recorded seven special teams tackles.

In 2015, he again dressed in all 18 regular season games and had six special teams tackles. Reinhart also played in his first post-season game which was a loss to the Hamilton Tiger-Cats in the East Semi-Final.

In the 2017 season, Reinhart played in all 18 regular season games and both post-season games. He played in the first Grey Cup game of his career which ended in an Argonaut victory over the Calgary Stampeders in the 105th Grey Cup.

The Argonauts home pre-season game in 2018 was played at Alumni Stadium in Guelph, marking Reinhart's first return to play at his university's stadium. He finished the regular season with a career-high 11 special teams tackles in 18 regular season games. Reinhart was injured in the 2019 season opener and missed the first six games of his career. Prior to that, he had a 94 consecutive games played streak, including the post-season.

On February 28, 2020, Reinhart signed a contract extension with the Argonauts through to the 2022 season. However, he did not play in 2020 due to the cancellation of the 2020 CFL season. As of the 2021 season, he was the longest serving member of the Argonauts. On October 6, 2021, Reinhart suffered a severe elbow injury in a game against the Ottawa Redblacks that required emergency surgery in Guelph. Due to the severity of the injury and the possibility of an arm amputation, Reinhart missed the remainder of the season.

In 2022, Reinhart returned to the Argonauts and played in the team's first seven games before re-injuring the same elbow that caused him to miss the rest of the 2021 season. After spending time on the injured list, he announced his retirement on September 30, 2022. At the time of his retirement, he was the longest tenured member of the team and had played in 117 regular season games, two playoff games, one Grey Cup and had recorded 35 special teams tackles.

== Personal life ==
Reinhart was born in Guelph, Ontario to parents Ellen and John Reinhart. His younger brother, Will, played football with him in high school, and his youngest brother, Job, also played long snapper at Guelph and was drafted by the Calgary Stampeders in 2019 CFL draft. Following his retirement from football, Reinhart announced that he had accepted a position with the Kitchener Fire Department.
