= Terry Poole (American football) =

American gridiron football player (born 1992)

No. 68, 69
- Position: Offensive tackle

Personal information
- Born: February 27, 1992 (age 34); Seaside, California, U.S.
- Listed height: 6 ft 5 in (1.96 m)
- Listed weight: 323 lb (147 kg)

Career information
- High school: Seaside
- College: San Diego State
- NFL draft: 2015: 4th round, 130th overall pick

Career history
- Seattle Seahawks (2015–2016); Miami Dolphins (2016–2017)*; Houston Texans (2017)*; San Diego Fleet (2019); Houston Roughnecks (2020); Winnipeg Blue Bombers (2021)*; Toronto Argonauts (2021); New Jersey Generals (2022–2023); Pittsburgh Maulers (2023); Memphis Showboats (2024)
- * Offseason or practice squad member only

Awards and highlights
- All-USFL Team (2022); Mid-season All-XFL Team (2020); Second-team All-MWC (2014)
- Stats at Pro Football Reference

Terry Poole (born February 27, 1992) is an American former professional football offensive tackle. He played college football at San Diego State and Monterey Peninsula College.

== Professional career ==
=== Seattle Seahawks ===
Poole was selected by the Seattle Seahawks in the fourth round with the 130th pick in the 2015 NFL draft. Poole was released on September 5, 2015, and was signed to the practice squad the next day.

On September 3, 2016, he was waived/injured by the Seahawks and placed on injured reserve. He was released on October 3, 2016.

=== Miami Dolphins ===
On October 11, 2016, Poole was signed to the Miami Dolphins' practice squad. He signed a reserve/future contract with the Dolphins on January 10, 2017. He was waived on August 5, 2017.

=== Houston Texans ===
Poole was claimed off waivers by the Houston Texans on August 6, 2017, but was waived two days later after failing his physical.

=== San Diego Fleet ===
On August 16, 2018, Poole signed with the San Diego Fleet of the Alliance of American Football. He was one of seven San Diego State alumni to make the team's final 52-man roster. The league ceased operations in April 2019.

=== Houston Roughnecks ===
Poole was selected by the Houston Roughnecks of the XFL in the 2020 XFL draft. He had his contract terminated when the league suspended operations on April 10, 2020.

=== Winnipeg Blue Bombers ===
Poole signed with the Winnipeg Blue Bombers of the Canadian Football League on June 25, 2021.

=== Toronto Argonauts ===
On July 19, 2021, Poole was traded to the Toronto Argonauts in exchange for defensive back Alden Darby.

=== New Jersey Generals ===
Poole was selected by the New Jersey Generals of the United States Football League (USFL) in the seventh round of the 2022 USFL draft.

The San Antonio Brahmas of the XFL selected Poole in the third round of the 2023 XFL Supplemental Draft on January 1, 2023, but he instead re-signed with the Generals on January 11. The Generals waived Poole in April 2023.

=== Pittsburgh Maulers ===
Poole was claimed off waivers by the Pittsburgh Maulers on April 25, 2023, and subsequently placed on the team's inactive roster. The Maulers folded when the XFL and USFL merged to create the United Football League (UFL).

=== Memphis Showboats ===
Poole was selected by the Memphis Showboats during the 2024 UFL dispersal draft on January 5, 2024. He was released on April 15, 2024.
