= Declan Cross =

Canadian gridiron football player (born 1993)

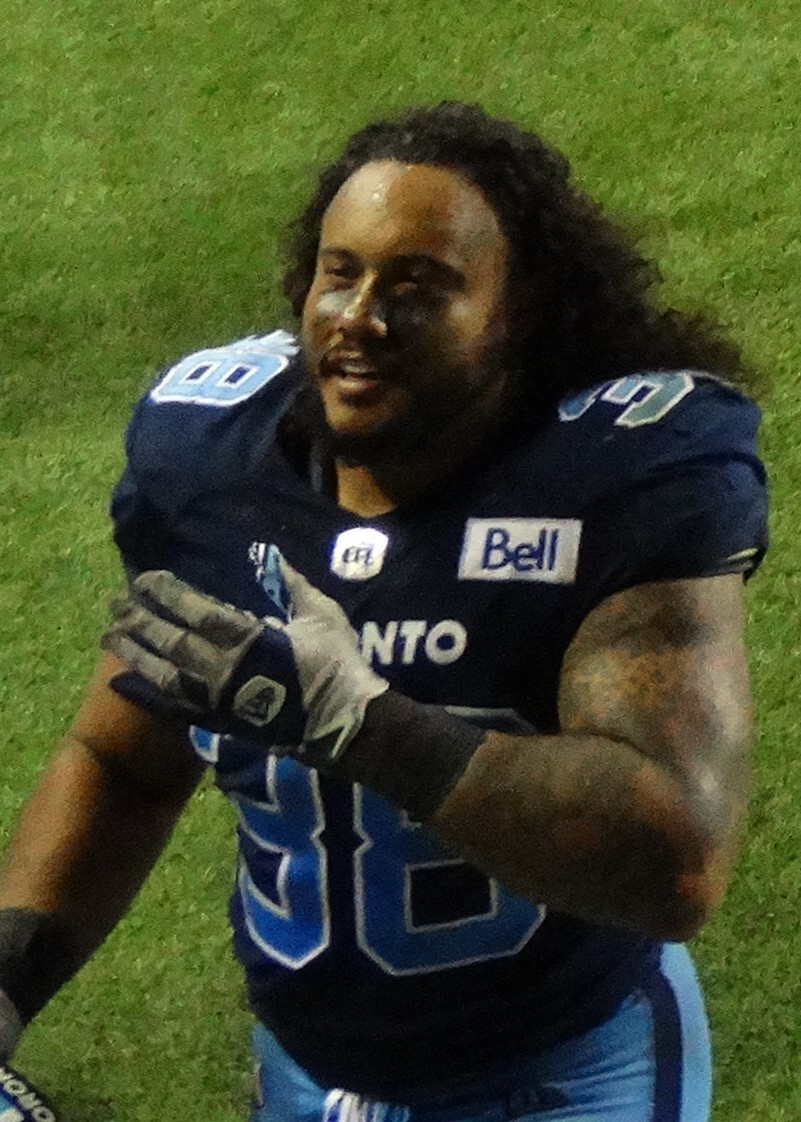
- Cross with the Toronto Argonauts in 2021

No. 38
- Position: Fullback

Personal information
- Born: July 25, 1993 (age 33); Oakville, Ontario, Canada
- Listed height: 5 ft 11 in (1.80 m)
- Listed weight: 230 lb (104 kg)

Career information
- High school: Holy Trinity
- University: McMaster Marauders
- CFL draft: 2016: 4th round, 27th overall pick

Career history
- 2016–2022: Toronto Argonauts

Awards and highlights
- 2× Grey Cup champion (2017, 2022); 2× Yates Cup champion (2012, 2014)
- Stats at CFL.ca

Declan Cross (born July 25, 1993) is a Canadian former professional football fullback who played six seasons for the Toronto Argonauts of the Canadian Football League (CFL). He is a Grey Cup champion with the Argonauts and a Yates Cup champion with the Marauders.

== University career ==
Cross played Canadian Interuniversity Sport (CIS) football with the McMaster Marauders from 2012 to 2015, as a Receiver/H-Back. Over four seasons while being used primarily as a blocker he recorded 34 rushes for 228 yards, 47 receptions for 469 yards and 5 touch downs. During his time playing for McMasters Football team, the Marauders won the Yates Cup in 2012 and 2014 and also appeared in the Vanier Cup in the same years. Cross was named McMaster's Most Valuable Offensive Player in 2014.

== Professional career ==
Cross was drafted in the fourth round, 27th overall, by the Toronto Argonauts in the 2016 CFL draft and signed with the team on May 19, 2016. He made the active roster after the conclusion of training camp and dressed for all 18 games of the 2016 Toronto Argonauts season. He made his first career reception in the Labour Day Classic against the Hamilton Tiger-Cats on September 5, 2016. Following the hiring of Marc Trestman as head coach for the 2017 season, Cross gained a more prominent role in the offense. He scored his first career touchdown on July 24, 2017, on a three-yard pass from Ricky Ray in a game against the Ottawa Redblacks. For the regular season, he recorded 36 catches for 366 yards and five touchdowns. He won his first Grey Cup championship in the 105th Grey Cup game where he had five catches for 36 yards and a pair of two-point conversion scores. During the following off-season, on December 21, 2017, he signed a contract extension with the Argonauts through to the 2020 CFL season.

Cross played in all 18 games for a third consecutive season, and produced three rushes for 10 yards, and 30 catches for 242 yards and two touchdowns. For 2019, Cross missed six games with injury, and as a receiver, was largely ignored in the scheme implemented by new offensive coordinator Jacques Chapdelaine; he had only nine catches during his 12 games, after logging at least 30 the previous two years. Cross did continue to excel as a blocker, and on only two carries set a new career high for rushing yards, with 11. Furthermore, as a fourth year player, he developed into a locker room leader for the embattled team, which finished with a 4–14 record for the second consecutive year. During the following off-season, on March 4, 2020, Cross signed a contract extension through to the 2023 season. However, he did not play in 2020 due to the cancellation of the 2020 CFL season.

In a pandemic-shortened 2021 season, Cross played in all 14 regular season games where he had four receptions for 36 yards and six special teams tackles. In 2022, he sat out six games due to injury and played in six regular season games where he had just two catches for 22 yards and six special teams tackles. He also played in both post-season games that year, including his second Grey Cup game. While he did not record any statistics, he capped off his sixth professional season with an Argonauts' victory in the 109th Grey Cup game. On December 19, 2022, Cross announced his retirement from professional football. He finished his career having played in 92 regular season games where he recorded 83 receptions for 740 yards and seven touchdowns, seven carries for 28 rushing yards, and 33 special teams tackles.
