= Chris Kolankowski =

Canadian gridiron football player (born 1992)

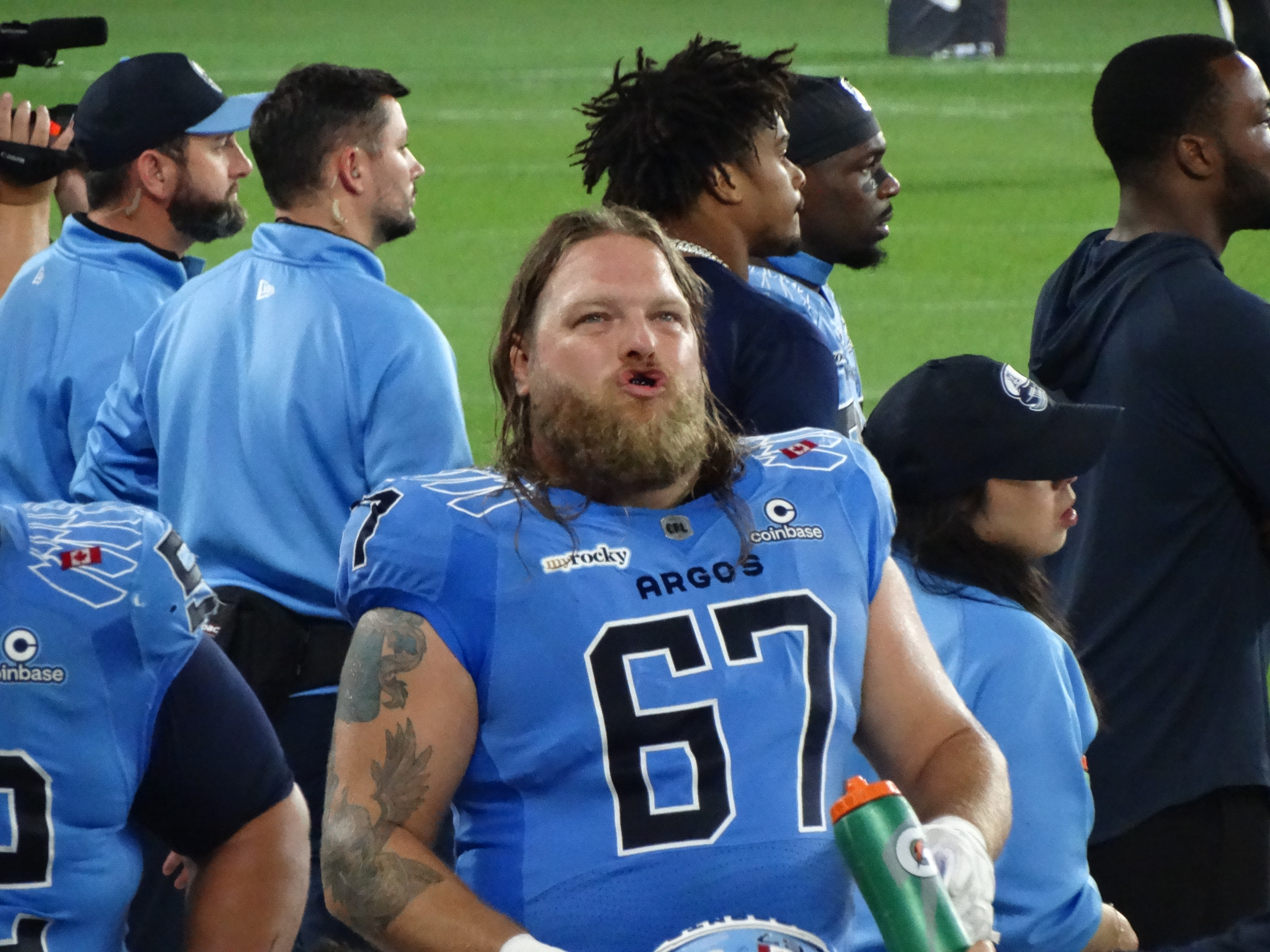
- Kolankowski with the Toronto Argonauts in 2026

No. 67 – Toronto Argonauts
- Position: Offensive lineman
- Roster status: Active
- CFL status: National

Personal information
- Born: February 7, 1992 (age 34); Etobicoke, Ontario, Canada
- Listed height: 6 ft 1 in (1.85 m)
- Listed weight: 307 lb (139 kg)

Career information
- University: York
- CFL draft: 2016: 6th round, 49th overall pick

Career history
- Toronto Argonauts (2016–2018); Winnipeg Blue Bombers (2020–2025); Hamilton Tiger-Cats (2026); Toronto Argonauts (2026–present)

Awards and highlights
- 2× Grey Cup champion (2017, 2021)
- Stats at CFL.ca

Chris Kolankowski (born February 7, 1992) is a Canadian professional football offensive lineman for the Toronto Argonauts of the Canadian Football League (CFL). He is a two-time Grey Cup champion after winning with the Argonauts in 2017 and with the Winnipeg Blue Bombers in 2021.

== University career ==
Kolankowski played U Sports football for the York Lions from 2012 to 2016. Kolankowski majored in Law and Society while at York University.

== Professional career ==
=== Toronto Argonauts (first stint) ===
Kolankowski was drafted by the Toronto Argonauts in the sixth round, 49th overall, in the 2016 CFL draft and signed with the club on May 19, 2016. He was released following 2016 training camp and returned to York for his final year of eligibility. He re-signed with the Argonauts on December 7, 2016. He dressed for six regular season games as a back-up offensive lineman as well as both post-season games for the 2017 Toronto Argonauts. He won his first Grey Cup with the Argos in the 105th Grey Cup game. After two seasons, he was released by the Argonauts on April 23, 2019.

=== Winnipeg Blue Bombers ===
After sitting out the 2019 season, Kolankowski signed as a free agent with the Winnipeg Blue Bombers on February 6, 2020. However, he also did not play in 2020 due to the cancellation of the 2020 CFL season. He dressed in the last two regular season games as a backup lineman during the 2021 season after spending most of the season on the practice roster. He also dressed in the 108th Grey Cup as the Blue Bombers defeated the Hamilton Tiger-Cats and Kolankowski won his second Grey Cup championship.

In 2022, Kolankowski dressed in 17 regular season games and started 15 at centre following an injury to the incumbent, Michael Couture. He also dressed in the 109th Grey Cup, but the Blue Bombers lost to his former team, the Toronto Argonauts. After Couture left in free agency, Kolankowski became the team's starting centre as he started in all 18 regular season games in 2023. He started in his first post-season game in the West Final against the BC Lions that year, and also started in the 110th Grey Cup loss to the Montreal Alouettes.

Kolankowski played and started in all 18 regular season games in 2024 and both post-season games. However, he lost his third straight Grey Cup in the team's 111th Grey Cup loss to the Argonauts. He played in all 18 regular season games in 2025 and also played in the team's East Semi-Final loss to the Montreal Alouettes. As a pending free agent, he was granted an early release on January 5, 2026.

=== Hamilton Tiger-Cats ===
On January 13, 2026, it was announced that Kolankowski had signed with the Hamilton Tiger-Cats. He started in the first game of the 2026 season and then dressed as a backup for the next seven games.

=== Toronto Argonauts ===
Kolankowski was traded to the Argonauts on August 3, 2026, in exchange for a sixth-round pick in the 2027 CFL draft.
