= Chris Rudge =

Canadian business executive (born 1945)

Chris Rudge (born 1945) is a Canadian business executive. He was chairman and CEO for the Toronto Argonauts of the Canadian Football League from 2012 to 2015. Following a business career in the printing industry, Rudge was CEO of the Canadian Olympic Committee for the 2010 Winter Olympics in Vancouver and Whistler, British Columbia, and also chaired the successful Canadian program 'Own The Podium'.

== Biography ==
Rudge grew up in Malton, Ontario, which is now a part of the amalgamated city of Mississauga. He earned an undergraduate degree in Physical Education from the University of Toronto, and a certificate in Education from Queen's University.

Rudge was a senior executive with the printing firm Quebecor World Inc. He retired from that role in 2002, when Quebecor World was the world's largest commercial printing firm.

Rudge was CEO of the Canadian Olympic Committee leading up to the 2010 Olympics. He also led the highly successful Canadian program 'Own The Podium', which funded and developed Canadian high performance athletes in winter sports, preparing for the 2010 Olympics. Canadian athletes produced a Games-leading 14 gold medals, the country's best-ever total in a Winter Olympics. They led Canada to a third-place finish in overall medals with 26, good for third place behind the United States and Germany; this was the country's best overall finish at a Winter Games.

Rudge was hired in 2011 to run the 100th Grey Cup game and festival, scheduled for November 2012 in Toronto. On January 30, 2012, the Argonauts hired Rudge to take over from Bob Nicholson, as team president and CEO as well, on a contract which will extend past the Grey Cup game in 2012. In May 2015, the Toronto Argonauts were bought by Kilmer Sports and Bell Canada from David Braley, and Michael Copeland replaced Rudge as President and CEO of the Argonauts at the beginning of 2016, when Rudge's contract came to an end in December 2015.
