= Malcolm Williams (Canadian football) =

Canadian football player (born 1993)

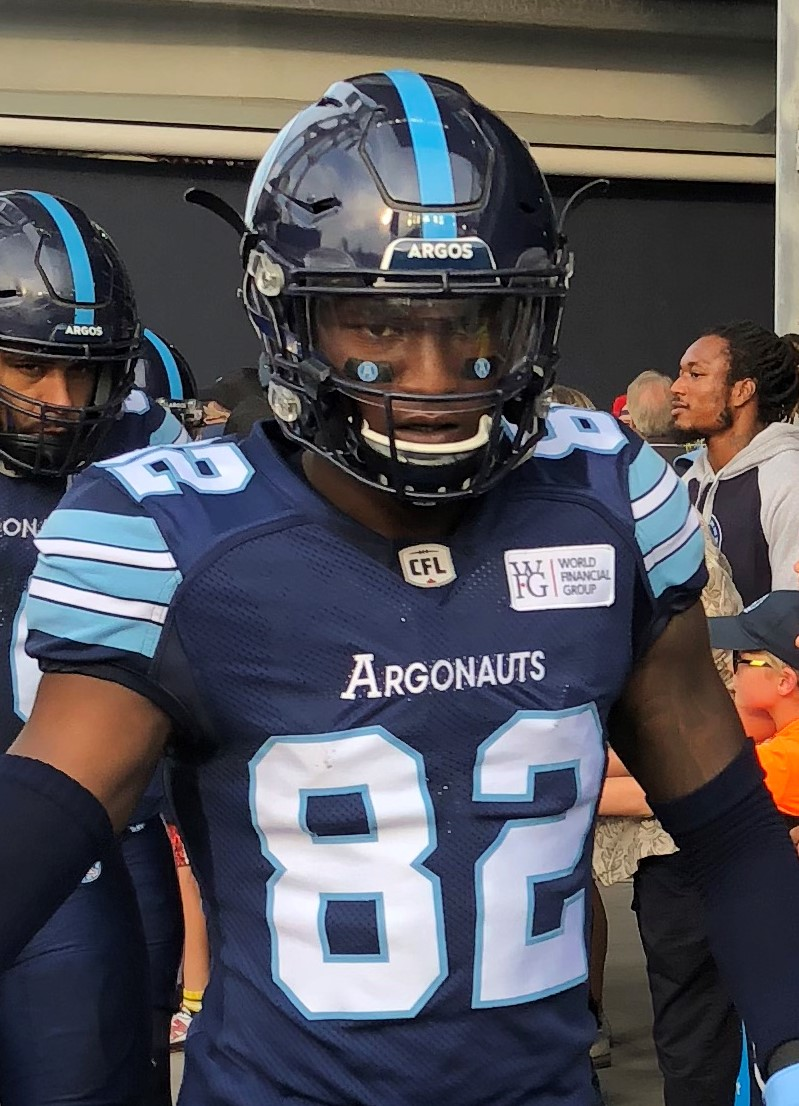
- Williams with the Toronto Argonauts in 2018

No. 82, 84
- Position: Wide receiver

Personal information
- Born: May 23, 1993 (age 33); Maple Ridge, British Columbia
- Listed height: 6 ft 3 in (1.91 m)
- Listed weight: 221 lb (100 kg)

Career information
- CJFL: Langley Rams
- University: Manitoba Bisons
- CFL draft: 2015: undrafted

Career history
- 2016–2018: Toronto Argonauts
- 2019: Winnipeg Blue Bombers
- 2020–2021: Ottawa Redblacks*
- * Offseason or practice squad member only

Awards and highlights
- 2× Grey Cup champion (2017, 2019)
- Stats at CFL.ca

Malcolm Williams (born May 23, 1993) is a Canadian former professional football wide receiver. He was undrafted in the 2015 CFL draft, but was signed by the Toronto Argonauts as a free agent.

== Amateur career ==
He first played basketball for the UBC Thunderbirds in 2011, before switching to the football and playing for the Langley Rams of the Canadian Junior Football League where he played from 2012 to 2014. He then enrolled at the University of Manitoba where he redshirted with the Manitoba Bisons for the 2015 season due to transfer rules. Rather than play for the Bisons in the 2016 season, he decided to sign a professional contract.

== Professional career ==
=== Toronto Argonauts ===
Williams signed as an undrafted free agent with the Toronto Argonauts on January 22, 2016, and spent the year on the Argonauts' practice roster. He re-signed on December 7, 2016, and made his CFL debut on July 24, 2017, against the Ottawa Redblacks where he had four receptions for 39 yards in an Argonauts victory. He played in 14 regular season games, starting nine, finishing with 14 receptions for 153 yards. Williams played in both post-season games that year and won his first Grey Cup championship following the Argonauts' victory in the 105th Grey Cup game. He played in 10 games in 2018, recording 13 receptions for 113 yards. He was released by the Argonauts on June 8, 2019, as part of final training camp cuts.

=== Winnipeg Blue Bombers ===
On July 22, 2019, Williams was signed to a practice roster agreement by the Winnipeg Blue Bombers. He played in five regular season games for the Blue Bombers and was on the practice roster while the team won the 107th Grey Cup. He then became a free agent on November 26, 2019.

=== Ottawa Redblacks ===
Williams signed with the Ottawa Redblacks on February 10, 2020. He re-signed with the Redblacks on January 19, 2021. He retired from football on June 22, 2021.
