= Cleyon Laing =

Canadian gridiron football player (born 1990)

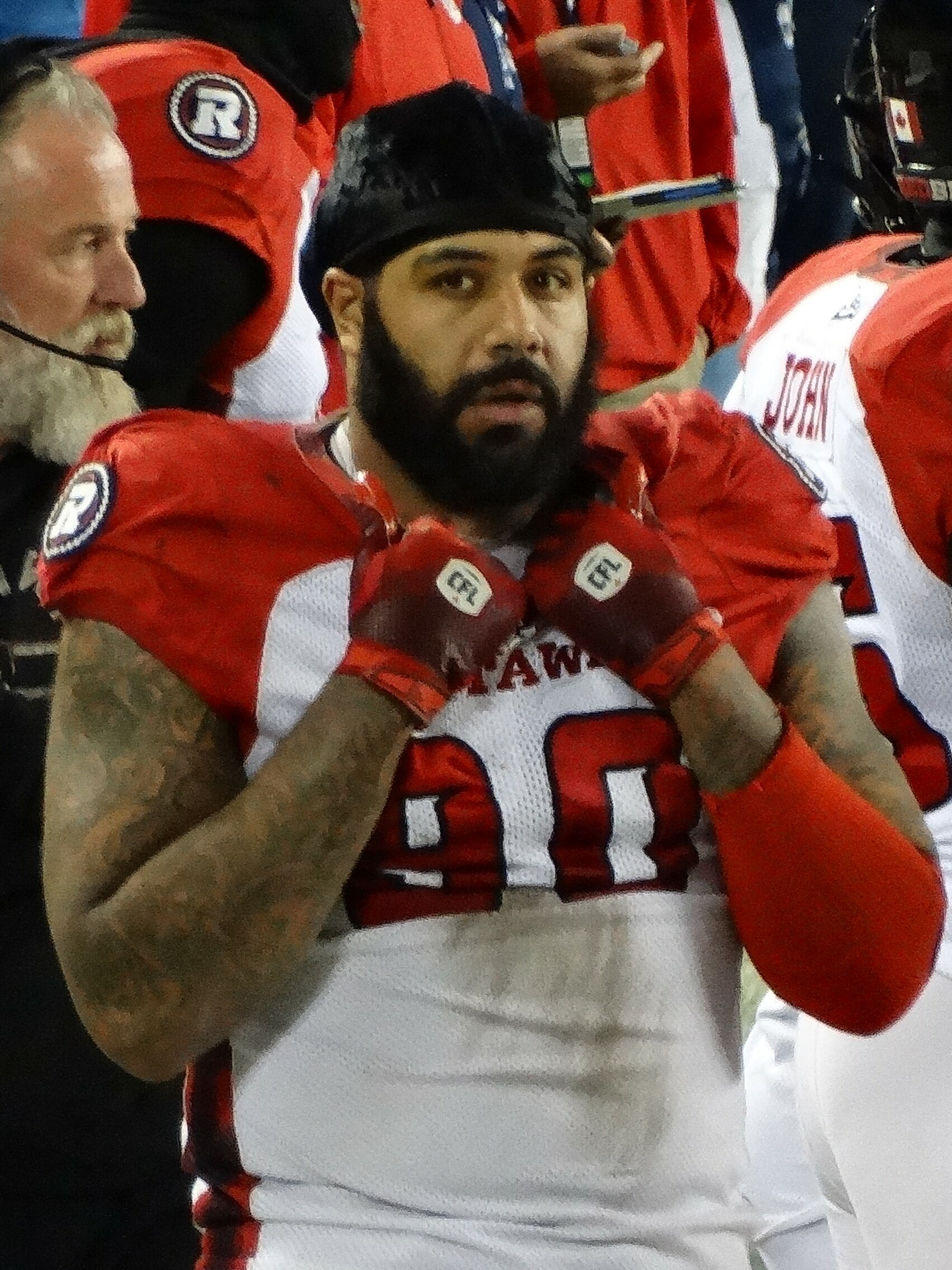
- Laing with the Ottawa Redblacks in 2023

No. 90 – Ottawa Redblacks
- Position: Defensive lineman
- Roster status: Active
- CFL status: National

Personal information
- Born: November 21, 1990 (age 35); Edmonton, Alberta, Canada
- Listed height: 6 ft 3 in (1.91 m)
- Listed weight: 285 lb (129 kg)

Career information
- High school: Holy Trinity Catholic
- College: Iowa State
- NFL draft: 2013: undrafted
- CFL draft: 2012: 1st round, 9th overall pick

Career history
- Toronto Argonauts (2013–2015); Miami Dolphins (2016)*; Ottawa Redblacks (2016); Toronto Argonauts (2017–2019); Ottawa Redblacks (2020–present)
- * Offseason or practice squad member only

Awards and highlights
- 2× Grey Cup champion (2016, 2017); 4× CFL East All-Star (2015, 2017, 2018, 2019)

Career CFL statistics as of 2025
- Games played: 168
- Def. tackles: 252
- Sacks: 51
- Forced fumbles: 4
- Stats at CFL.ca

Cleyon Laing (born November 21, 1990) is a Canadian professional football defensive lineman for the Ottawa Redblacks of the Canadian Football League (CFL). He was selected ninth overall by the Toronto Argonauts in the 2012 CFL draft. Laing is a four-time CFL East Division All-Star and a two-time Grey Cup champion, having won with Ottawa in 2016 and then with Toronto in 2017. He played college football with the Iowa State Cyclones.

== Professional career ==
Pre-draft measurables
Height	Weight	Arm length	Hand span	Wingspan	40-yard dash	10-yard split	20-yard split	20-yard shuttle	Three-cone drill	Vertical jump	Broad jump	Bench press
6 ft 3 1/4 in (1.91 m)	285 lb (129 kg)	34 in (0.86 m)	9 1/2 in (0.24 m)	6 ft 9 7/8 in (2.08 m)	5.09 s	1.74 s	2.91 s	4.65 s	7.51 s	31.5 in (0.80 m)	9 ft 6 in (2.90 m)	25 reps
All values from Pro Day

=== Toronto Argonauts (first stint) ===
Laing was selected ninth overall in the 2012 CFL draft by the Toronto Argonauts, but finished his college eligibility before signing with the team on May 15, 2013. He played for the Argonauts for three seasons finishing his stint with 72 tackles, 16 sacks, two forced fumbles and a safety. After his strong performance in the CFL, including CFL East All-Star honours in 2015, Laing drew the attention of NFL teams.

=== Miami Dolphins ===
On February 29, 2016, Laing was signed by the Miami Dolphins of the NFL. On September 3, 2016, he was released by the Dolphins as part of final roster cuts. The next day he was signed to the Dolphins' practice squad. He was released on October 31, 2016.

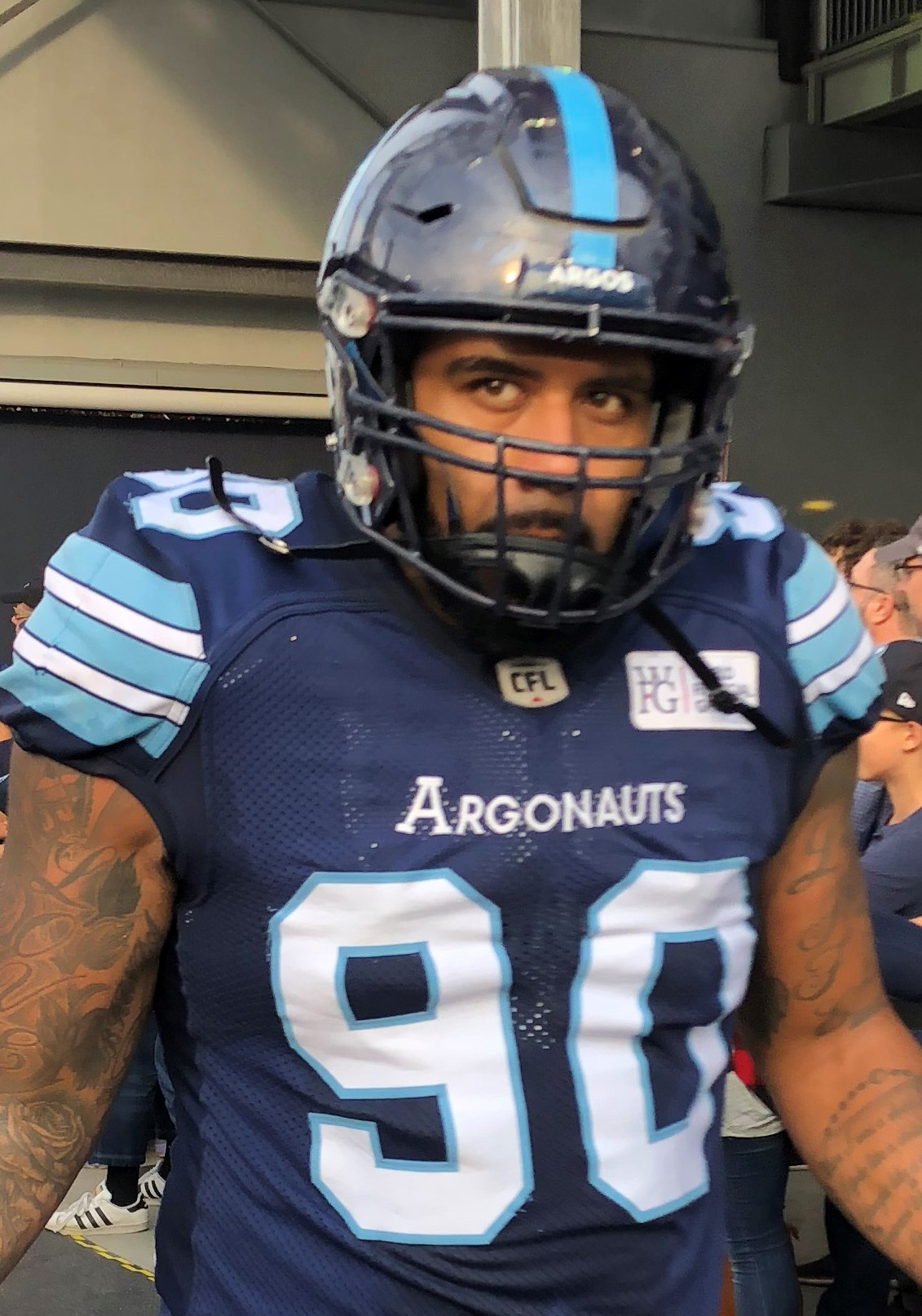
Laing with the Toronto Argonauts in 2018

=== Ottawa Redblacks (first stint) ===
Only three days after his release from the Dolphins practice roster, he was signed by the Ottawa Redblacks of the Canadian Football League; just days before their final game of the regular season. Laing appeared in one regular season game with the Redblacks, as well as two post season games which included their Grey Cup victory over the Calgary Stampeders.

=== Toronto Argonauts (second stint) ===
On April 29, 2017, Laing signed with the Argonauts. Despite missing time with an injury, Laing recorded five sacks and a forced fumble during 11 regular season games played in 2017, and was named a CFL East All-Star for the second time. During the playoffs, Laing recorded the first sack of the 105th Grey Cup as part of a 27–24 Argonauts victory over Calgary. It was his second consecutive Grey Cup championship. Laing signed a two-year extension with Toronto the following January, and had a quick start to the 2018 season with three sacks in the first four games. Although the Argos missed the playoffs with a 4–14 record, Laing played in all 18 games, racking up 44 tackles and six sacks, and was named to his third CFL East All-Star team. Laing was also the team nominee for the CFL's Most Outstanding Defensive Player award. The 2019 season was similar for both Laing and the team; the team played poorly to start the year and missed the playoffs. Meanwhile, Laing, who had another effective stretch of early season games in which he earned four sacks over three outings, won the Toronto award for Most Outstanding Defensive Player for the second consecutive year; he was additionally named Toronto's Most Outstanding Canadian Player. Laing was also named to his third consecutive Eastern All-Star team, the only member of Toronto's defense to be so honored.

=== Ottawa Redblacks (second stint) ===
Upon entering free agency, Laing signed a three-year contract with the Redblacks on February 11, 2020. Ottawa restructured the deal with Laing for 2021 following a cancelled 2020 season, a shortened season where Laing played 13 out of 14 possible games, putting up 25 tackles and three sacks. On Jan 14, 2025, Laing and the Redblacks agreed to a contract extension through 2026.

== Personal life ==
Laing's biological older brother is Canadian actor and model Jeffrey Bowyer-Chapman. His biological father is of Jamaican descent.
