= Marcus Brady =

American football player and coach (born 1979)

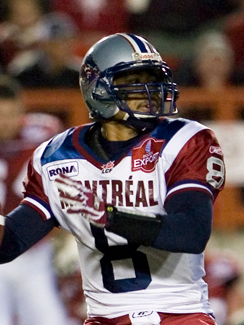
- Brady with the Montreal Alouettes in 2007

Baltimore Ravens
- Title: Passing game coordinator

Personal information
- Born: September 24, 1979 (age 47); San Diego, California, U.S.
- Listed height: 6 ft 0 in (1.83 m)
- Listed weight: 210 lb (95 kg)

Career information
- Position: Quarterback (No. 3, 8, 18)
- High school: Morse (San Diego)
- College: Cal State Northridge
- NFL draft: 2002: undrafted

Career history

Playing
- Toronto Argonauts (2002–2003); Hamilton Tiger-Cats (2004–2005); Montreal Alouettes (2006–2008)

Coaching
- Montreal Alouettes (2009–2011) Wide receivers coach; Montreal Alouettes (2012) Offensive coordinator; Toronto Argonauts (2013–2017) Offensive coordinator; Indianapolis Colts (2018) Assistant quarterbacks coach; Indianapolis Colts (2019–2020) Quarterbacks coach; Indianapolis Colts (2021–2022) Offensive coordinator; Philadelphia Eagles (2022) Offensive consultant; Philadelphia Eagles (2023) Senior offensive assistant; Los Angeles Chargers (2024–2025) Passing game coordinator; Baltimore Ravens (2026–present) Passing game coordinator

Awards and highlights
- As coach: 3× Grey Cup champion (2009, 2010, 2017)

Career CFL statistics
- TD–INT: 15–16
- Passing yards: 3,321
- Completion percentage: 52.5
- Rushing yards: 679
- Rushing touchdowns: 6
- Stats at CFL.ca (archived)
- Coaching profile at Pro Football Reference

Marcus Brady (born September 24, 1979) is an American football coach and former quarterback who is the passing game coordinator for the Baltimore Ravens of the National Football League (NFL). He previously served as the offensive coordinator for the Indianapolis Colts from 2021 to 2022 and also served as an assistant coach for the Philadelphia Eagles, Toronto Argonauts and Montreal Alouettes.

He played college football at California State University, Northridge and in 2002 was signed as an undrafted free agent by the Toronto Argonauts of the Canadian Football League (CFL). Brady played for seven seasons in the CFL for the Toronto Argonauts, Hamilton Tiger-Cats and Montreal Alouettes.

== Playing career ==
=== College ===
Brady attended Cal State Northridge as a business major, where he started 43 straight games. He held his school's all-time lead for completions (1,036), attempts (1,677), yards (12,445) and touchdowns (109).

=== Canadian Football League ===
==== Toronto Argonauts ====
In 2002, Brady signed with the Toronto Argonauts as an undrafted free agent. He played with the Argonauts for two seasons.

==== Hamilton Tiger-Cats ====
In 2004, Brady was signed by the Hamilton Tiger-Cats and played for two seasons with the team.

==== Montreal Alouettes ====
In 2006, Brady was acquired and signed by the Montreal Alouettes as a free agent. He backed up starter Anthony Calvillo and was used primarily for short yardage situations. He also punted for the Alouettes in place of Damon Duval. He retired on April 2, 2009.

== Coaching career ==
=== Montreal Alouettes ===
Following his retirement as a football player, Brady began his coaching career and was hired by the Montreal Alouettes, his former team, to serve as their wide receivers coach in 2009. Following the departure of Scott Milanovich, Brady was promoted to offensive coordinator on December 4, 2011.

=== Toronto Argonauts ===
On December 3, 2012, Brady was hired to be the offensive coordinator of the Toronto Argonauts.

=== Indianapolis Colts ===
In 2018, Brady was hired by the Indianapolis Colts as their assistant quarterbacks coach under head coach Frank Reich. In 2019, Brady was promoted to quarterbacks coach. On January 25, 2021, Brady was promoted to offensive coordinator, replacing Nick Sirianni, who departed to become head coach of the Philadelphia Eagles. He was fired by the Colts on November 1, 2022, vacating his position as offensive coordinator.

=== Philadelphia Eagles ===
On November 22, 2022, ESPN reported that Brady had been hired by the Philadelphia Eagles as an offensive consultant.

On February 28, 2023, Brady was hired by the Philadelphia Eagles as a senior offensive assistant under head coach Nick Sirianni.

=== Los Angeles Chargers ===
On February 8, 2024, Brady was named as passing game coordinator for the Los Angeles Chargers under head coach Jim Harbaugh. Brady was fired by the Chargers after two seasons.

=== Baltimore Ravens ===
On February 6, 2026, Brady was hired as passing game coordinator for the Baltimore Ravens under head coach Jesse Minter.

== Personal life ==
Brady is married to his wife, Sherrie, and together they have a daughter, Saliyah, and a son, Aaden. Brady played basketball and baseball at Samuel F. B. Morse High School in San Diego.
