= Matt Black (Canadian football) =

Canadian gridiron football player (born 1985)

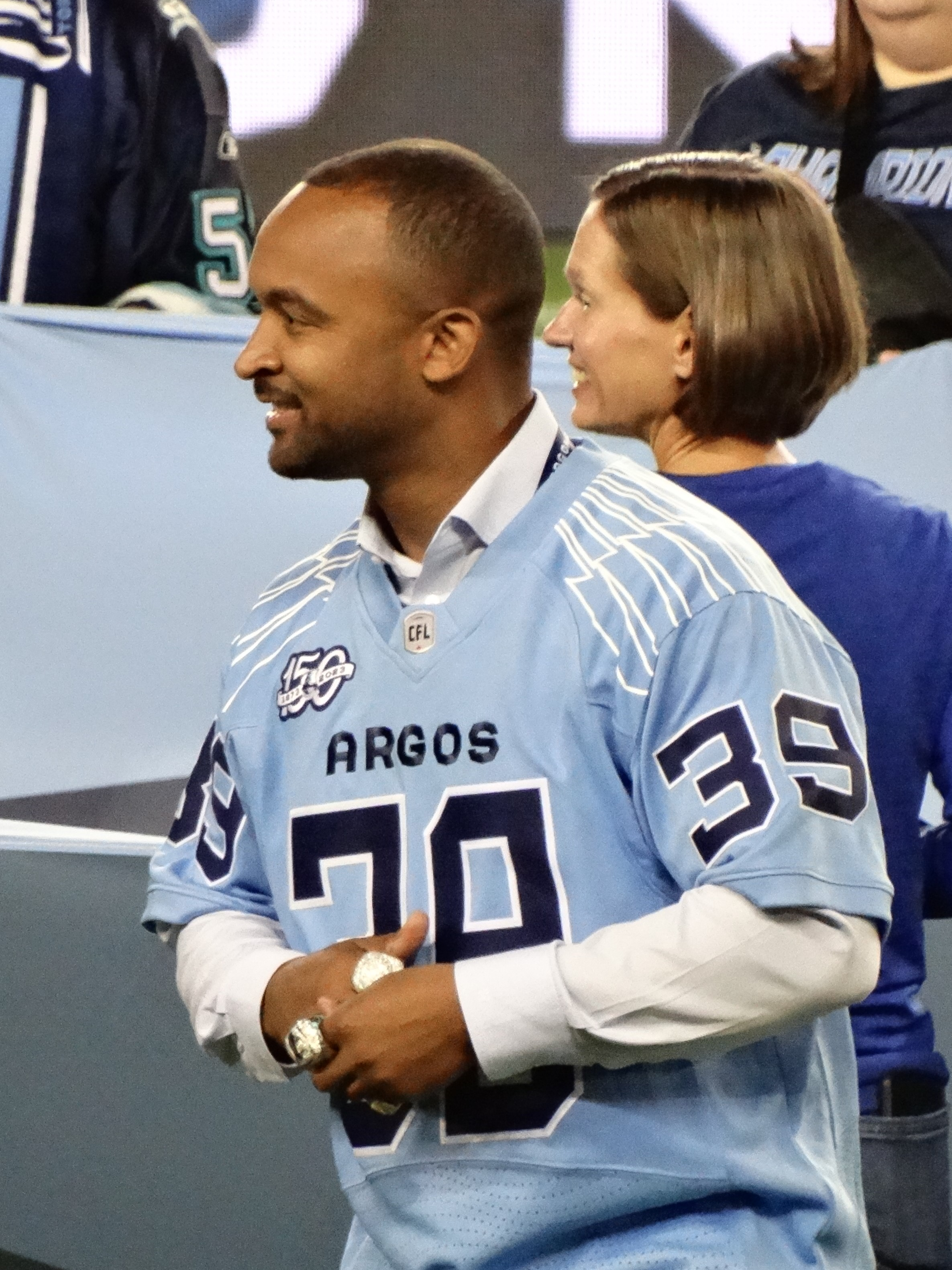
- Black in 2023

Profile
- Position: Cornerback/Kick returner

Personal information
- Born: March 1, 1985 (age 41); Toronto, Ontario, Canada
- Listed height: 5 ft 10 in (1.78 m)
- Listed weight: 182 lb (83 kg)

Career information
- High school: Northern
- College: Saginaw Valley State
- CFL draft: 2008: 6th round, 45th overall pick

Career history
- Toronto Argonauts (2009–2018)

Awards and highlights
- Grey Cup champion (2012, 2017)

Career CFL statistics
- Tackles: 128
- Sacks: 2
- Int.: 3
- Stats at CFL.ca (archived)

Matthew Black (born March 1, 1985) is a Canadian former professional football defensive back who played ten seasons with the Toronto Argonauts of the Canadian Football League (CFL). He won two Grey Cup championships in 2012 and 2017.

== Early life ==
Black was born in Toronto, Ontario, Canada, to parents Marlane and Donovan, and has a younger brother Eric and a younger sister Destiny. As young boy, Black was in a French immersion program at Market Lane School Public School in downtown Toronto. While playing football at Northern Secondary School in Toronto, Ontario, Black was named the Mid-Town Football Most Valuable Player. In addition to football, Black played rugby, ice hockey, baseball, and Track and field athletics at high school. He was also an all-star member of the Metro Toronto Wildcats of the Ontario Varsity Football League, where he was named the league's Most Outstanding Defensive Back.

== College career ==
Black went on to play college football at Saginaw Valley State University where he studied communications and marketing and was a four-year starter for the Cardinals football team. He was redshirtted in 2004 but started all games in 2005 as a red-shirt freshman. In 2006, he led the Cardinals with a 14.8-yard punt return average and took 8 kickoff returns back for a total of 203 yards and a touchdown. Black was named to the Academic All-Conference team in 2007 and returned 12 punts for 91 yards in 8 games played. In his final season, Black, was named to the First-Team All-Great Lakes Intercollegiate Athletic Conference team, selected to the Valero Cactus Bowl senior all-star game, recorded 42 tackles, 4 pass break-ups, and ranked third in the GLIAC with 5 interceptions for 119 yards, including 1 for a 19-yard touchdown. He earned a GLIAC Player of the Week honour in 2008 as well.

== Professional career ==
Black was drafted in the sixth round of the 2008 CFL draft by the Toronto Argonauts and signed to play on March 10, 2009. In his first eight seasons with the club Black played in 109 games, with his two most significant seasons being 2013, when he contributed 34 tackles and 2016 when he set a career-high with 44. He was released by the Argos early in the 2017 season (having not played a game), but was re-signed a week later. Black's interception in the final seconds of the 105th Grey Cup sealed a 27–24 victory for the Argos over the Calgary Stampeders. One day before becoming a free agent Black and the Argos agreed to a two-year contract extension.
