= Josh Mitchell (Canadian football) =

American gridiron football player (born 1993)

No. 29
- Position: Defensive back

Personal information
- Born: January 7, 1993 (age 33); Los Angeles County, California, U.S.
- Listed height: 5 ft 8 in (1.73 m)
- Listed weight: 175 lb (79 kg)

Career information
- High school: Eleanor Roosevelt (Eastvale, California)
- College: Nebraska (2010–2014)
- NFL draft: 2015: undrafted

Career history
- Indianapolis Colts (2015); Toronto Argonauts (2016–2017)

Awards and highlights
- Grey Cup champion (2017)

Career CFL statistics
- Games played: 11
- Tackles: 34
- Pass deflections: 2
- Stats at CFL.ca
- Stats at Pro Football Reference

Joshua Quinn Mitchell (born January 7, 1993) is an American former professional football defensive back who played for the Toronto Argonauts of the Canadian Football League (CFL). He played college football for the Nebraska Cornhuskers. Mitchell had a stint with the Indianapolis Colts of the National Football League (NFL).

== Early life ==
Mitchell was born on January 7, 1993, in Los Angeles County, California, and attended Eleanor Roosevelt High School in Eastvale, California.

== College career ==
Mitchell played college football for the Nebraska Cornhuskers from 2010 to 2014. He was a four-year letterman from 2011 to 2014 after redshirting his first season. Mitchell played in 47 games, starting in 28, recording 104 tackles, including eight for loss, three sacks, three interceptions, 25 pass break ups, and a forced fumble which he returned for a touchdown against Miami in 2014.

== Professional career ==
Pre-draft measurables
Height	Weight	Arm length	Hand span	Wingspan	40-yard dash	10-yard split	20-yard split	20-yard shuttle	Three-cone drill	Vertical jump	Broad jump	Bench press
5 ft 9 in (1.75 m)	173 lb (78 kg)	30 1/4 in (0.77 m)	8 1/2 in (0.22 m)	6 ft 1/2 in (1.84 m)	4.50 s	1.53 s	2.56 s	4.34 s	6.46 s	35.5 in (0.90 m)	9 ft 9 in (2.97 m)	9 reps
All values from Pro day

=== Indianapolis Colts ===
After not being selected in the 2015 NFL draft, Mitchell signed with the Indianapolis Colts as an undrafted free agent. On May 26, he was placed on the waived/injured list. On March 30, 2016, he was released by the team.

=== Toronto Argonauts ===
On May 17, 2016, Mitchell signed with the Toronto Argonauts of the Canadian Football League (CFL). In his first three games, he had 13 tackles. On July 12, Mitchell was moved to the injured list. On September 4, he was elevated to the active roster. In ten games, Mitchell logged 34 total tackles with two pass break ups and ended the season on the injured list. In 2017, he played just one game before suffering a season-ending injury. On February 13, 2018, Mitchell became a free agent.

== Personal life ==
After retiring from football, Mitchell joined the defensive coaching staff at his alma mater, Eleanor Roosevelt High School.
