= Ken Bishop =

American football player (born 1990)

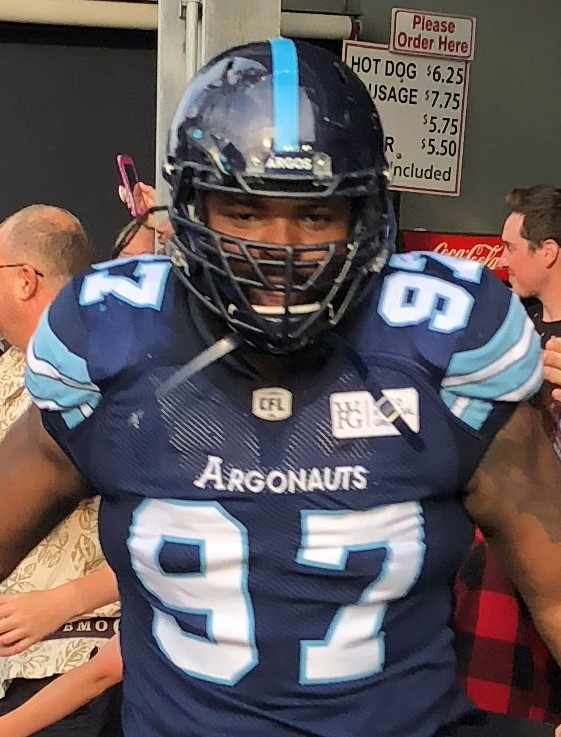
- Bishop with the Toronto Argonauts in 2018

No. 66, 93, 97
- Position: Defensive tackle

Personal information
- Born: September 8, 1990 (age 36); Fort Lauderdale, Florida, U.S.
- Listed height: 6 ft 0 in (1.83 m)
- Listed weight: 300 lb (136 kg)

Career information
- High school: Piper (Sunrise, Florida)
- College: Northern Illinois
- NFL draft: 2014: 7th round, 251st overall pick

Career history
- Dallas Cowboys (2014–2015); Toronto Argonauts (2016–2019)

Awards and highlights
- Grey Cup champion (2017); First-team All-MAC (2013); All-MFC (2011)

Career NFL statistics
- Games played: 5
- Stats at Pro Football Reference

Career CFL statistics
- Games played: 44
- Stats at CFL.ca

Ken Bishop (born September 8, 1990) is an American former professional football player who was a defensive tackle for the Dallas Cowboys of the National Football League (NFL) and the Toronto Argonauts of the Canadian Football League (CFL). He was selected by the Cowboys in the seventh round of the 2014 NFL draft. He played college football for the Northern Illinois Huskies.

== Early life ==
Bishop attended Piper High School. As a senior, he earned second-team All-state honors. He received invitations to the North-South All-Star Game and the Dade-Broward All-Star Game in 2009.

He enrolled at Ellsworth Community College, where as a freshman he tallied 64 tackles (third on the team), 2 sacks and a fumble recovery. The next year, he registered 67 tackles (second on the team), 2 sacks and a pass defensed in 9 games played.

In 2012, he transferred to Northern Illinois University. As a junior, he posted 55 tackles (eighth on the team) and 2 sacks (sixth on the team), while starting 9 out of 14 games, including one at fullback in the MAC Championship contest.

As a senior, he recorded 70 tackles (fourth on the team), 7 tackles for loss (tied for fourth) and 2 interceptions. In 27 games he finished with 125 tackles (16.5 for loss), 3.5 sacks and 2 interceptions.

== Professional career ==
=== Dallas Cowboys ===
Bishop was selected by the Dallas Cowboys in the seventh round (251st overall) of the 2014 NFL draft. He took part in three of the first four games of his first professional career season. On October 18, he was waived to make room for linebacker Keith Smith. On October 21, he was re-signed to the practice squad. On January 10, 2015, he was promoted to the active roster for the playoff game against the Green Bay Packers.

In 2015, he appeared in 2 games (was declared inactive for 2) without registering a tackle. On October 5, he was released to make room for suspended defensive end Greg Hardy.

=== Toronto Argonauts ===
On May 25, 2016, he was signed by the Toronto Argonauts of the Canadian Football League. He appeared in 16 games (15 starts), posting 31 tackles (3 for loss), 3 sacks, one forced fumble and 2 passes defensed.

In 2017, he played sporadically due to injuries. He recorded 6 tackles in 5 games (4 starts) separated by several stints on the injured list. He missed the 105th Grey Cup game with an injury, which the Argonauts won.

On February 6, 2018, the Argonauts signed Bishop to a one-year extension. Bishop provided a lot depth on the defensive line. He appeared in 16 games, collecting 18 tackles and 2 sacks.

On February 22, 2019, Bishop re-signed with Toronto. He was released on August 23. He appeared in 7 games, tallying 11 tackles and one sack.
