= Cameron Walker (Canadian football) =

Canadian football player (born 1992)

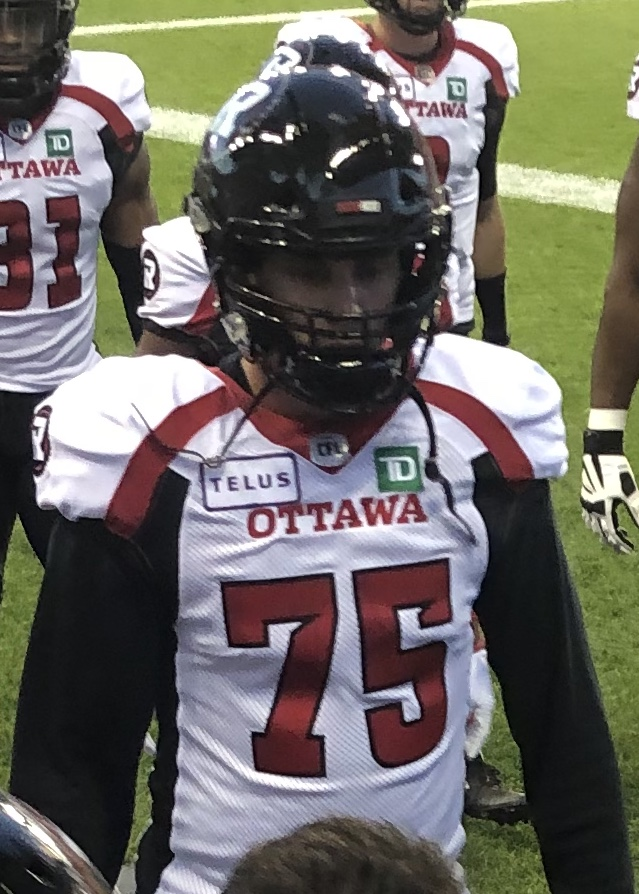
- Walker with the Ottawa Redblacks in 2019

No. 75
- Position: Defensive lineman

Personal information
- Born: November 10, 1992 (age 33); London, Ontario, Canada
- Listed height: 6 ft 4 in (1.93 m)
- Listed weight: 237 lb (108 kg)

Career information
- High school: St. Thomas Aquinas
- University: Guelph
- CFL draft: 2015: 3rd round

Career history
- 2015–2017: Toronto Argonauts
- 2018: Ottawa Redblacks*
- 2018: Toronto Argonauts
- 2019: Hamilton Tiger-Cats
- 2019: Ottawa Redblacks
- 2020: BC Lions*
- * Offseason or practice squad member only
- Stats at CFL.ca

Cameron Walker (born November 10, 1992) is a Canadian former professional football defensive lineman who played in the Canadian Football League (CFL) for the Toronto Argonauts, Ottawa RedBlacks, and Hamilton Tiger-Cats. He played CIS football for the Guelph Gryphons.

== Early life ==
Cameron Walker was born in London, Ontario and played college football at the University of Guelph where he registered 108 total tackles, 12 sacks and three forced fumbles in 31 games.

== Professional career ==
=== Toronto Argonauts (first stint) ===
Walker was drafted by the Toronto Argonauts in the third round, 21st overall, in the 2015 CFL draft and signed with the team on May 26, 2015. He played in his first professional game on August 14, 2015 against the Winnipeg Blue Bombers. He played in 35 games during his first stint with the Argonauts and was a member of the 105th Grey Cup championship team.

=== Ottawa Redblacks (first stint) ===
On February 15, 2018, Walker signed with the Ottawa Redblacks. He was released by the Redblacks prior to the season on May 19, 2018.

=== Toronto Argonauts (second stint) ===
Walker re-signed with the Argonauts on May 29, 2018. He played in all 18 regular season games and recorded his first career sack on October 20, 2018 against the Montreal Alouettes. He re-signed with the Argonauts during the following off-season on February 12, 2019, but was part of the final training camp cuts on June 8, 2019.

=== Hamilton Tiger-Cats ===
Two days after being released by Toronto, on June 10, 2019, Walker signed as a free agent with the Hamilton Tiger-Cats. He played in eight games in 2019 before being released on August 20, 2019.

=== Ottawa Redblacks (second stint) ===
Walker signed onto the practice roster of the Redblacks on September 10, 2019. He played in four regular season games for the team but was released during the following off-season on January 23, 2020.

=== BC Lions ===
On February 11, 2020, Walker signed a one-year contract with the BC Lions. However, the 2020 CFL season was cancelled and his contract expired on February 9, 2021.

== Business ventures ==
During 2021, Walker founded Brick Canada together with his brother Braedy. The company is a regional arm of the Swedish tech startup Brick Technology and offers powerbank sharing services through its mobile application.
