= Corey Watman =

Canadian football player (born 1989)

No. 69, 56
- Position: Offensive lineman

Personal information
- Born: June 17, 1989 (age 37); Queensville, Ontario, Canada
- Listed height: 6 ft 2 in (1.88 m)
- Listed weight: 294 lb (133 kg)

Career information
- High school: Huron Heights Secondary
- College: Eastern Michigan
- CFL draft: 2013: 1st round, 4th overall pick

Career history
- 2013–2015 2016–2017: Saskatchewan Roughriders; Toronto Argonauts

Awards and highlights
- 2× Grey Cup champion (2013, 2017)
- Stats at CFL.ca

Corey Alexander Watman (born June 17, 1989) is a Canadian former professional football offensive lineman in the Canadian Football League (CFL).

== College football ==
Watman played college football for the Eastern Michigan Eagles. After the 2012 CIS season, he was ranked as the 12th best player in the Canadian Football League's Amateur Scouting Bureau final rankings for players eligible in the 2013 CFL draft.

== Professional football ==
=== Saskatchewan Roughriders ===
Watman was drafted in the first round, fourth overall by the Saskatchewan Roughriders and signed with the team on May 30, 2013.

=== Toronto Argonauts ===
On February 9, 2016, on the first day of free agency, Watman signed with the Toronto Argonauts. He played for the team for two years before ending his career after playing in the 105th Grey Cup championship win in 2017.
