= Phil Bates (gridiron football) =

American gridiron football player (born 1989)

No. 81
- Position: Wide receiver

Personal information
- Born: September 20, 1989 (age 37); Omaha, Nebraska, U.S.
- Listed height: 6 ft 1 in (1.85 m)
- Listed weight: 220 lb (100 kg)

Career information
- High school: Omaha North
- College: Ohio
- NFL draft: 2012: undrafted

Career history
- Seattle Seahawks (2012–2014); Cleveland Browns (2014); Dallas Cowboys (2015)*; Toronto Argonauts (2015–2016); Saskatchewan Roughriders (2016)
- * Offseason or practice squad member only

Awards and highlights
- Super Bowl champion (XLVIII)
- Stats at Pro Football Reference

Phil Bates (born September 20, 1989) is an American former professional football player who was a wide receiver in the National Football League (NFL). He played college football for the Ohio Bobcats. He was signed by the Seattle Seahawks as an undrafted free agent in 2012. With the Seahawks, he won Super Bowl XLVIII against the Denver Broncos.

== College career ==
Bates played college football at Iowa State University as a quarterback and wide receiver from 2007 to 2008. He then transferred to Ohio University, where he played from 2009 to 2011. He finished his career with 457 passing yards, five passing touchdowns, 738 rushing yards, three rushing touchdowns, 270 receiving yards, and one receiving touchdown.

== Professional career ==
=== Seattle Seahawks ===
Bates was signed by the Seattle Seahawks after going undrafted in the 2012 NFL draft.

On September 1, 2014, Bates was waived. He was signed to the Seahawks practice squad on September 9, 2014.

=== Cleveland Browns ===
On October 30, 2014, the Cleveland Browns signed Bates to their practice squad.

On December 27, 2014, Bates was called up from the Browns practice squad to their active roster for their season finale against the Baltimore Ravens after Josh Gordon was suspended by the team after failing to attend a team walk-through. He was released by the Browns on May 11, 2015.

=== Dallas Cowboys ===
Bates was signed by the Dallas Cowboys on August 20, 2015. He was released by the Cowboys on September 1, 2015.

=== Toronto Argonauts ===
Bates joined the Toronto Argonauts of the Canadian Football League in the second half of the 2015 CFL season. Besides seeing playing time late in the season, he also played in the East Division semi-final loss to the Hamilton Tiger-Cats on November 15, 2015. Bates played in only five of the Argos first 14 games, catching three passes for 20 yards with one touchdown. Following a Week 15 loss the Argos, the front office decided to release four of their wide receivers on the same day including Phil Bates. Reports suggest the four wide receivers were not committed to the Argos and had been a source of division in the locker room for some time.

He also played in five games for the Argonauts in 2016.

=== Saskatchewan Roughriders ===
Bates played in two games for the Saskatchewan Roughriders in 2016.
