= Michael Copeland (sports executive) =

Michael Copeland is a Canadian businessman and sports executive who has was Chief Executive Officer of Woodbine Entertainment Group since October 2023. He was the president and COO of the Canadian Football League from 2013 to 2015 and was the president and CEO of the Toronto Argonauts from 2016 to 2018.

== Life and career ==
In 1993, Copeland graduated from the University of Western Ontario in London, Ontario. In 1999, he received an MBA from the university's Ivey Business School.

Copeland went on to work at a variety of law and consulting companies, including practicing corporate and commercial law with Blake, Cassels & Graydon in Toronto and with Harrison, Elwood in London, Ontario. He became a Senior Consultant at Deloitte Consulting in Sydney, Australia, and then worked for three years with the Boston Consulting Group. After working with Boston Consulting, he went into business development and marketing at the Molson Coors Brewing Company.

=== Canadian Football League ===
In January 2006, he became the chief operating officer of the Canadian Football League. In February 2013, he became president and COO of the league.

In May 2015, the Toronto Argonauts were bought by Kilmer Sports and Bell Canada from David Braley. On 13 July 2015, it was announced that Copeland would become president and CEO of the Argonauts at the beginning of 2016. He replaced Chris Rudge, who had been in that role since 2012. In 2018, Copeland was replaced as president (by new owners Maple Leaf Sports & Entertainment) with Bill Manning.

== See also ==
- Toronto Argonauts
