= Brian Jones (wide receiver) =

Canadian gridiron football player (born 1994)

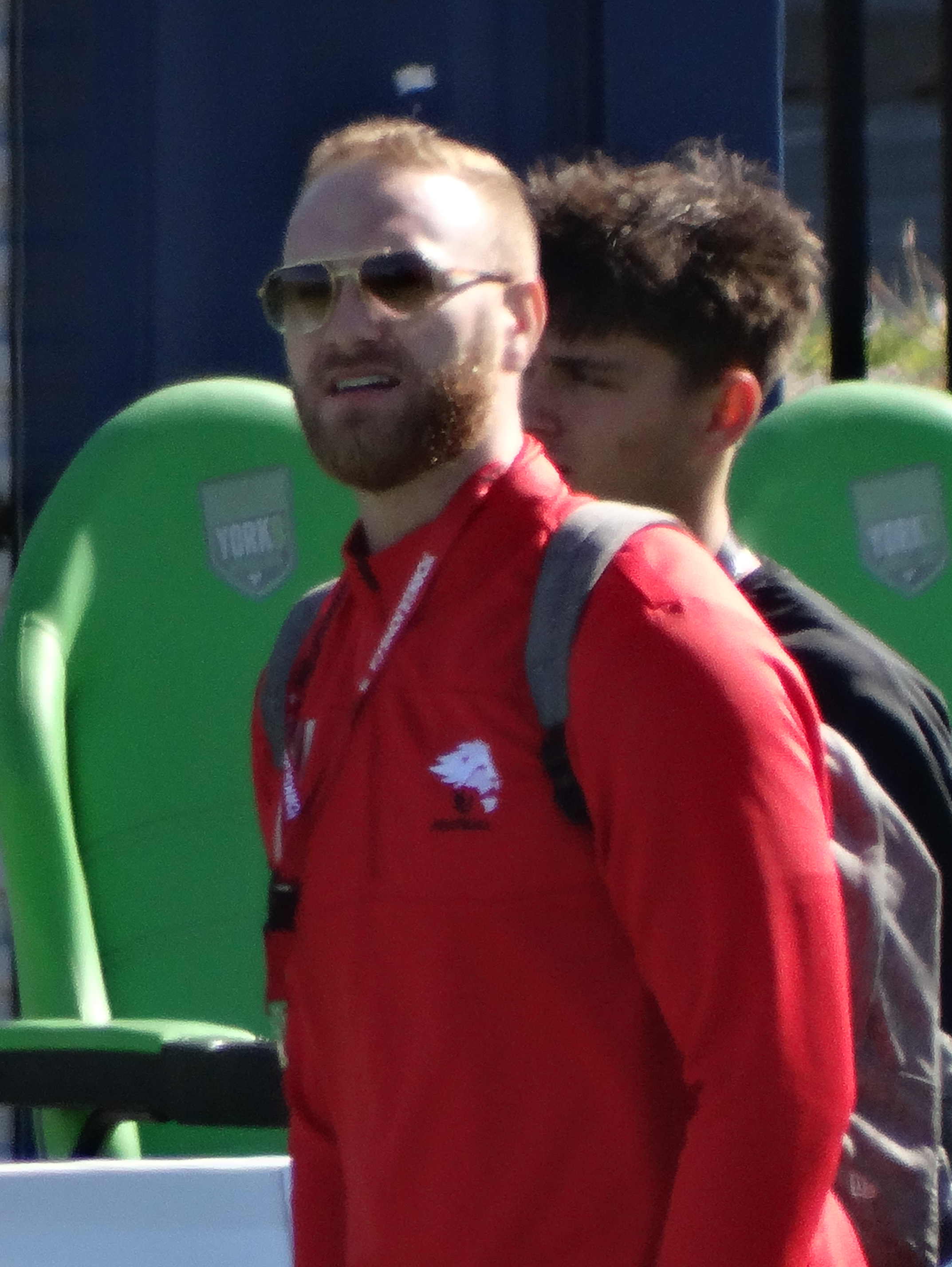
- Jones with the York Lions in 2024

Personal information
- Born: April 22, 1994 (age 32); Enfield, Nova Scotia, Canada
- Listed height: 6 ft 4 in (1.93 m)
- Listed weight: 233 lb (106 kg)

Career information
- Position: Wide receiver (No. 16)
- University: Acadia
- CFL draft: 2016: 1st round, 4th overall pick

Career history

Playing
- 2016–2018: Toronto Argonauts
- 2018: Saskatchewan Roughriders
- 2019–2020: Hamilton Tiger-Cats
- 2021: Toronto Argonauts

Coaching
- 2022–2024: York Lions (Special teams coordinator)
- 2023: York Lions (Associate head coach)

Career CFL statistics
- Games played: 44
- Receptions: 16
- Receiving yards: 168
- Receiving average: 10.5
- Touchdowns: 1
- Spec. teams tackles: 17
- Stats at CFL.ca

Brian Jones (born April 22, 1994) is a Canadian former professional football wide receiver and coach. He was most recently the special teams coordinator for the York Lions of U Sports football. He played professionally for the Toronto Argonauts, Saskatchewan Roughriders, and Hamilton Tiger-Cats of the Canadian Football League (CFL). He played Canadian Interuniversity Sport (CIS) football with the Acadia Axemen.

== University career ==
Jones played for the Acadia Axemen football team from 2013 to 2016. He was named the Atlantic University Sport Most Valuable Player in 2014 and a CIS Second team All-Star in 2015. In the CFL's Amateur Scouting Bureau final rankings, he was ranked as the tenth best of the players eligible in the 2016 CFL draft.

== Professional career ==
=== Toronto Argonauts ===
Jones was drafted fourth overall by the Toronto Argonauts in the 2016 CFL draft and signed with the team on May 29, 2016. He dressed for 12 games for the Argonauts in 2016, his rookie season, and started four. He made 12 receptions for 128 yards and a touchdown. He dressed in nine games in 2017 and three in 2018, but didn't record any receptions.

=== Saskatchewan Roughriders ===
On August 20, 2018, he was traded to the Saskatchewan Roughriders for a seventh-round pick in the 2019 CFL draft. There, he dressed in 10 games and recorded two receptions for 20 yards. He became a free agent on February 12, 2019.

=== Hamilton Tiger-Cats ===
Jones signed with the Hamilton Tiger-Cats on the first day of free agency on February 12, 2019. He played in the first two games of the season for the Tiger-Cats, but was released on June 26, 2019. He was re-signed by the Tiger-Cats on August 6, 2019. He re-signed with the team again on February 10, 2021. He was released on June 28, 2021.

=== Toronto Argonauts ===
On October 26, 2021, it was announced that Jones had re-signed with the Toronto Argonauts. He played in the last regular season game for the Argonauts in 2021 and his practice roster contract expired on December 6, 2021.

== Coaching career ==
Jones was hired as the special teams coordinator for the York Lions for the 2022 season. Just prior to the 2023 season, Jones was named an associate head coach of the Lions, alongside the team's offensive coordinator, Nathaniel Griffith. However, the team finished 0–8 that year, allowing an average of 70 points per game, resulting in the team hiring a permanent head coach for 2024. He was retained as the special teams coordinator under new head coach Dexter Janke for the 2024 season but left the team in 2025.
