= Kevin Elliott =

American gridiron football player (born 1988)

No. 18
- Position: Wide receiver

Personal information
- Born: December 21, 1988 (age 37); Fayetteville, North Carolina, U.S.
- Listed height: 6 ft 3 in (1.91 m)
- Listed weight: 213 lb (97 kg)

Career information
- High school: Orlando (FL) Colonial
- College: Florida A&M
- NFL draft: 2012: undrafted

Career history
- Jacksonville Jaguars (2012); Buffalo Bills (2012–2013); Brooklyn Bolts (2014); Toronto Argonauts (2015–2016); Hamilton Tiger-Cats (2016–2017); Ottawa Redblacks (2017); BC Lions (2018); Edmonton Eskimos / Football Team (2018–2020)

Awards and highlights
- 2014 FXFL All-Star

Career NFL statistics
- Receptions: 10
- Receiving yards: 108
- Receiving touchdowns: 0
- Stats at Pro Football Reference

Career CFL statistics
- Receptions: 93
- Receiving yards: 1,223
- Receiving TDs: 11
- Receiving average: 13.2
- Stats at CFL.ca

Kevin Elliott (born December 21, 1988) is a former gridiron football wide receiver. He was signed by the Jacksonville Jaguars as an undrafted free agent in 2012 and was also a member of the Buffalo Bills, Brooklyn Bolts (FXFL), Toronto Argonauts, Hamilton Tiger-Cats, Ottawa Redblacks, BC Lions, and Edmonton Eskimos / Football Team of the Canadian Football League (CFL). He played college football at Florida A&M. Moreover, in highschool, he was named the Orange County Athlete of the Year.

== College career ==
Elliott played at Florida A&M from 2007 to 2011.

== Professional career ==
Pre-draft measurables
Height	Weight	40-yard dash	10-yard split	20-yard split	20-yard shuttle	Three-cone drill	Vertical jump	Broad jump
6 ft 2 1/8 in (1.88 m)	212 lb (96 kg)	4.53 s	1.56 s	2.72 s	4.20 s	6.72 s	34.0 in (0.86 m)	10 ft 2 in (3.10 m)
All values from Pro Day

=== Jacksonville Jaguars ===
Elliott was signed by the Jacksonville Jaguars following the 2012 NFL draft. He was released by Jacksonville on December 14, 2012.

=== Buffalo Bills ===
Elliott was signed to the Buffalo Bills' on December 18, 2012. On August 16, 2013, he suffered a torn ACL during the second preseason game against the Minnesota Vikings. On August 18, Bills' head coach Doug Marrone announced that Elliott would be placed on injured reserve and miss the remainder of the season.

Elliott was waived by the Bills on August 18, 2014, prior to the start of the regular season.

=== Toronto Argonauts ===
On April 9, 2015, Elliott signed with the Toronto Argonauts of the Canadian Football League. Elliot had an impressive first season in the CFL playing in 16 of 18 regular season games and amassing 50 receptions for 642 yards with eight touchdowns. Elliott played in eight of Toronto's first 14 games, missing six due to injury. Following a Week 15 loss, front office decided to release four of their wide receivers on the same day, including Elliott. Reports suggest the four wide receivers were not committed to the Argonauts and had been a source of division in the locker room for some time. In eight games for the team, Elliott caught 23 passes for 294 yards with two touchdowns.

=== Hamilton Tiger-Cats ===
A week after being released Elliot signed with divisional rival Hamilton Tiger-Cats (CFL). He played three games to wrap up the season, posting 15 receptions for 220 yards and a touchdown. On March 2, 2017 Elliot re-signed with the Tiger-Cats after being a free agent for three weeks after his contract expired on February 14. He was subsequently released on August 8, after the Tiger-Cats posted an 0–6 record to start the season. Limited production was believed to be a factor in his release, catching only four passes for 54 yards in two games. The production numbers he put up were contrary to his production numbers in his three games with the team in 2016, Other reasons that may have contributed to his release from the team were not publicized.

=== Ottawa Redblacks ===
Within a month of being released by the Hamilton Tiger-Cats, Elliott was signed by the Ottawa Redblacks to provide support for the organization after an injury to former Argonauts teammate, Kenny Shaw. He played in a single game with the organization, registering one catch for 13 yards against the Winnipeg Blue Bombers in their September 22 game. As at January 15, 2018, Elliott was not listed as a member of the Ottawa Redblacks roster.

=== BC Lions ===
On May 9, 2018, the BC Lions announced they had signed Elliott to a contract along with five other wide receivers. He was released after playing five games with the Lions on September 12, recording 176 receiving yards and a touchdown on 14 receptions.

=== Edmonton Eskimos / Football Team ===
Elliott signed a contract extension with Edmonton through the 2021 season on January 11, 2021. He retired from football on June 23.

== Personal life ==
Elliott's cousin, Kahlil Benson, plays football professionally for fhe Kansas City Chiefs of the National Football League.
