= 105th Grey Cup =

2017 Canadian Football championship game

Toronto Argonauts	Calgary Stampeders
(9–9)	(13–4–1)
27	24
Head coach: Marc Trestman	Head coach: Dave Dickenson
	1	2	3	4	Total
Toronto Argonauts	0	8	8	11	27
Calgary Stampeders	6	11	7	0	24
- Date: November 26, 2017
- Stadium: TD Place Stadium
- Location: Ottawa
- Most Valuable Player: DeVier Posey, WR (Argonauts)
- Most Valuable Canadian: Jerome Messam, RB (Stampeders)
- Favourite: Stampeders by 7
- National anthem: Choir! Choir! Choir!
- Coin toss: Julie Payette
- Referee: Dave Foxcroft
- Halftime show: Shania Twain
- Attendance: 36,154

Broadcasters
- Network: Canada (English): TSN; Canada (French): RDS; United States: ESPN2
- Announcers: Chris Cuthbert (play-by-play); Glen Suitor (analyst); Sara Orlesky (sideline reporter); Matthew Scianitti (sideline reporter)
- Ratings: 4.3 million (average); 10 million (total)

The 105th Grey Cup was played on November 26, 2017, between the Calgary Stampeders and the Toronto Argonauts at TD Place Stadium in Ottawa, Ontario.

In a re-match of the 100th Grey Cup, the Argonauts won the game 27–24, winning their 17th championship.

== Background ==
=== Host city ===
It was reported in September 2015 that Ottawa would host the Grey Cup game, and that it would be determined at a board of governor's meeting later that fall. The Ottawa Redblacks ownership group, Ottawa Sports and Entertainment Group, said that one of the clauses in their expansion agreement was that the club would host a Grey Cup game within their first four years of existence. Since the Redblacks entered the league in 2014, 2017 was the fourth such year. Ottawa had previously been awarded the 102nd Grey Cup but backed out due to construction delays; that game was held in Vancouver instead.

During a Redblacks game on July 31, 2016, it was announced in a video featuring Prime Minister Justin Trudeau that the city of Ottawa had been selected to host the 105th Grey Cup, in part to celebrate the 150th anniversary of Canada. This was the seventh time that the Grey Cup game was played in Ottawa, with previous games being played at Lansdowne Park. The previous game hosted by Ottawa was when the Ottawa Renegades hosted the 92nd Grey Cup in 2004, when the Toronto Argonauts defeated the BC Lions.

Redblacks president Jeff Hunt stated that approximately 10,000 temporary seats would be added to TD Place Stadium, bringing seating capacity to about 35,000. In early May, more than six months before the game, the Redblacks announced that fewer than 6,000 of the original 35,000 tickets were yet to be sold. Due to ticket demand, the Redblacks added additional temporary bleachers in September to bring capacity to approximately 36,000, and the game officially sold out on October 26.

=== Teams ===
==== Calgary Stampeders ====
The Stampeders finished the regular season with a record of 13–4–1, once again placing as the top team in the West Division. They became the first team in the league to clinch a playoff spot in week 14 of the regular season with a 15–9 victory over the Saskatchewan Roughriders. The Stampeders entered the playoffs on a losing streak, losing three in a row for the first time since 2007.

As the first place team in the West, the Stampeders received a bye in the first round of the playoffs and hosted the Western Final on November 19 against the third place Edmonton Eskimos. The Stampeders won the game 32–28 in a closely contested game that featured a controversial play by the Eskimos, who late in the fourth quarter opted to kick a field goal in the hopes that they could recover the ball, instead of tying the game with a touchdown. Calgary maintained possession until the end of the game to clinch victory.

==== Toronto Argonauts ====
The Argonauts placed first in the East Division with a 9–9 record and returned to the playoffs after having missed the previous season. The Argos entered the season with a new head coach in Marc Trestman, the former head coach of the Montreal Alouettes and the NFL's Chicago Bears. The team's resurgence was led by quarterback Ricky Ray, who completed the 2017 regular season having thrown for 5,546 yards and 28 touchdowns. Despite the team's success on the field, the team averaged only 13,914 fans per home game at BMO Field, which was down from the previous year.

As the first place team in the East, the Argos hosted the Saskatchewan Roughriders in the Eastern Final after the Riders, as a crossover team, defeated the Ottawa Redblacks in the Semi-Final. The Argos won the close game 25–21 after scoring a touchdown with 23 seconds left in the game. It was the first time the Argos had won the Eastern Final since 2012, the last time they won the Grey Cup.

==== Head-to-head ====
Calgary and Toronto met twice during the 2017 regular season, with Calgary winning both times. Their first meeting took place during week 7 in Toronto and saw the Stampeders win 41–24. Three weeks later, the teams met again in Calgary, with the Stampeders winning 23–7. The 2017 Grey Cup was the fourth championship match-up between the two teams, with Calgary winning in 1971 and Toronto victorious in 1991 and 2012. The Argos' 2017 Grey Cup victory was their first defeat of the Calgary Stampeders since a 33–27 win in September 2013.

During the week leading up to the game, the mayors of Toronto and Calgary, John Tory (who was the CFL commissioner from 1996 to 2000) and Naheed Nenshi, placed a friendly bet on the outcome, with the losing city's mayor having to donate to charity, wear the winning team's jersey at the next city council meeting, and send the other a selection of local craft beer.

== Game summary ==
Toronto won the coin toss and opted to defer to the second half. Calgary chose to receive the ball. The game was played in inclement conditions, with snow falling prior to kickoff and persisting throughout. Neither team could sustain drives throughout much of the first quarter until eleven minutes in, when Stamps quarterback Bo Levi Mitchell connected with Kamar Jorden for the contest's first touchdown. Calgary missed the subsequent two-point convert attempt, but found themselves up 6–0.

Scrimmaging from their own 10-yard line, the Argos opened the second quarter with a bang. DeVier Posey caught a pass from Toronto quarterback Ricky Ray at the Argo 44 and scampered to the end zone to tie the game 6–6. At 100 yards, this now stands as the longest touchdown pass in Grey Cup history, breaking the previous mark of 99 yards set by Montreal's Anthony Calvillo and Pat Woodcock in 2002. Calgary responded five minutes later with a touchdown by running back Jerome Messam and a successful two-point convert to go up 14–6. While the Argos were shut out offensively in the second quarter, they scored two points thanks to a safety conceded by Calgary punter Rob Maver who, after mishandling a high snap, kicked the ball out of the back of the end zone. Rene Paredes booted a field goal with five seconds left in the quarter to put the Stampeders up 17–8 at the half.

Toronto opened the scoring in the second half four minutes into the third quarter with a two-yard touchdown run by running back James Wilder Jr. A successful two-point conversion made the score 17–16. Jerome Messam found the end zone again for the Stampeders roughly five minutes later, putting Calgary up 24–16 after a successful convert by Parades. The Stamps protected this lead into the fourth quarter and appeared well on their way to victory when, with the ball on the Argo 8-yard-line, Toronto DB Cassius Vaughn pounced on a Kamar Jorden fumble and returned the ball 109 yards for a touchdown—another Grey Cup record. A two-point convert reception by Declan Cross tied the game at 24–24 with under five minutes to play. With 53 seconds left, Argo kicker Lirim Hajrullahu kicked the team's lone field goal, giving Toronto its first lead at 27–24. On their final possession Calgary drove the ball deep into Argonaut territory, but instead of attempting a game-tying field goal decided to go for the jugular. On 2nd-and-5 from the Argonaut 25, Mitchell's would-be touchdown pass fell into the hands of Argo defender Matt Black, sealing the victory for the Double Blue.

=== Scoring summary ===
First Quarter
CGY – TD Jorden 33-yard pass (missed two-point convert) (4:00) 6–0 CGY

Second Quarter
TOR – TD Posey 100 yard pass (missed convert) (15:00) 6–6 Tie
CGY – TD Messam 6 yard rush (Daniels two-point convert) (10:21) 14–6 CGY
TOR – Safety Maver (5:46) 14–8 CGY
CGY – FG Paredes 39 yards (0:05) 17-8 CGY

Third Quarter
TOR – TD Wilder Jr 2 yard rush (Cross two-point convert) (10:51) 17–16 CGY
CGY – TD Messam 6-yard pass (Paredes convert) (6:19) 24–16 CGY

Fourth Quarter
TOR – TD Vaughn 109 yard fumble return (Cross two-point convert) (5:16) 24–24 Tie
TOR – FG Hajrullahu 32 yards (0:53) 27–24 TOR

== Entertainment ==
On August 10, 2017, the CFL announced that Shania Twain would perform during the Freedom Mobile Halftime Show. The performance marked Twain's second Grey Cup halftime show; she performed as halftime entertainment during the 90th Grey Cup in 2002.

Vancouver-based rapper SonReal performed immediately prior to the game as part of the SiriusXM Kickoff Show. Toronto choir Choir! Choir! Choir! sang the national anthem.

== Aftermath ==
Immediately following the game, Argonauts receiver DeVier Posey was named the game's Most Valuable Player, having put up 175 yards and one touchdown on seven receptions. Running back Jerome Messam of the Stampeders received the Dick Suderman Trophy as the game's Most Valuable Canadian after scoring two touchdowns.

With the victory, Argonauts quarterback Ricky Ray became the first quarterback in CFL history to win the Grey Cup four times as a starting quarterback (twice with the Edmonton Eskimos and twice with the Argonauts).

== Television ==
The game was watched by an average of 4.3 million viewers, with viewership peaking at nearly six million during the Argos' comeback in the fourth quarter. Nearly a third of the population of Canada watched part of the game. The game saw a ten percent increase in viewership over the previous year and a fifty-eight percent increase in viewership in the Toronto/Hamilton market. Overall, the 105th Grey Cup was the most watched Grey Cup since 2013.
