= 2012 Edmonton Eskimos season =

Canadian football team season

- General manager: Eric Tillman - Fired Nov 3rd, 2012
- Head coach: Kavis Reed
- Home stadium: Commonwealth Stadium

Results
- Record: 7–11
- Division place: 4th, West
- Playoffs: Lost East Semi-Final
- Team MOP: J. C. Sherritt, LB
- Team MOC: Ted Laurent, DT
- Team MOR: Shamawd Chambers, WR

Uniform
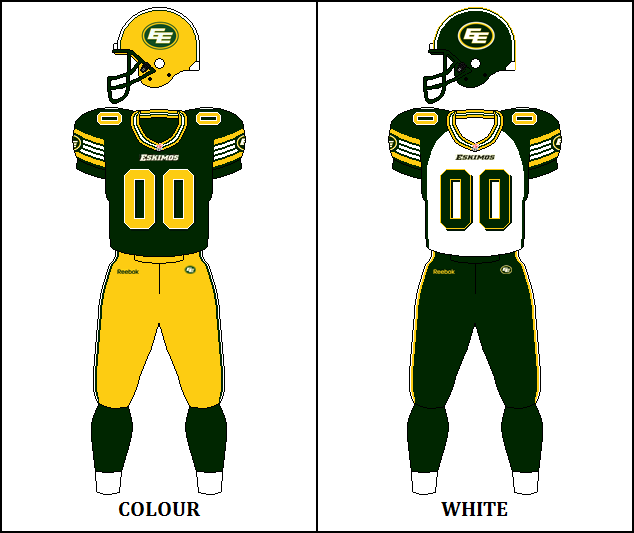

The 2012 Edmonton Eskimos season was the 55th season for the team in the Canadian Football League (CFL) and their 64th overall. The Eskimos finished in fourth place in the West Division with a 7–11 record but still managed to make the playoffs for the second straight season via the CFL's "crossover" rule. The Eskimos played the Toronto Argonauts in the East Semi-Final and lost 42–26.

== Offseason ==
=== CFL draft ===
The 2012 CFL draft took place on May 3, 2012, live at 1:00 PM MDT. The Eskimos had five selections in the six-round draft, including two in the first round after trading Ricky Ray to the Toronto Argonauts.

Round	Pick	Player	Position	School/Club team
1	4	Austin Pasztor	OL	Virginia
1	6	Shamawd Chambers	WR	Wilfrid Laurier
2	14	Justin Capicciotti	DL	Simon Fraser
5	36	Hasan Hazime	DE	Akron
5	38	Ryan King	LB	Saint Mary's

=== Notable transactions ===
Date	Type	Incoming	Outgoing	Team
December 12, 2011	Trade	Steven Jyles (QB); Grant Shaw (K/P); *1st-round pick in 2012 CFL draft – Jabar Westerman (DL)	Ricky Ray (QB)	Toronto Argonauts
February 23, 2012	Trade	Future considerations	Eric Wilbur (K/P)	Winnipeg Blue Bombers
April 23, 2012	Trade	**6th-round pick in 2013 CFL draft - Shane Bergman (OL)	Xavier Fulton (OL)	Saskatchewan Roughriders
May 3, 2012	Trade	1st-round pick in 2012 CFL draft – Austin Pasztor (OL); 2nd-round pick in 2012 CFL draft – Justin Capicciotti (DL); 5th-round pick in 2012 CFL draft – Ryan King (LB)	1st-round pick in 2012 CFL draft – Jabar Westerman (DL); 3rd-round pick in 2012 CFL draft – Michael Atkinson (DL)	BC Lions
May 25, 2012	Trade	Merrill Johnson (LB)	Conditional 6th-round pick in 2014 CFL draft	Winnipeg Blue Bombers
September 5, 2012	Trade	Matt O'Donnell (OL); 4th-round pick in 2013 CFL draft - Jorgen Hus (LB)	Greg Carr (WR); ***5th-round pick in 2013 CFL draft - Alex Anthony (WR)	Saskatchewan Roughriders
September 12, 2012	Trade	Brody McKnight (K)	Derek Schiavone (P/K); 1st-round pick in 2013 CFL draft - Mike Edem (LB); 4th-round pick in 2013 CFL draft - Nicolas Boulay (LB)	Montreal Alouettes
September 13, 2012	Trade	Darcy Brown (FB)	Ricardo Colclough (DB); 6th-round pick in 2015 CFL draft - Everett Ellefsen (DB)	Hamilton Tiger-Cats

*Later traded to the BC Lions
**Later traded to the Calgary Stampeders
***Later traded back to the Saskatchewan Roughriders

== Preseason ==
#	Date	Visitor	Score	Home	Attendance	Record
A	Fri, June 15	Edmonton Eskimos	17–20	Calgary Stampeders	23,629	0–1
B	Thurs, June 21	BC Lions	24–16	Edmonton Eskimos	30,891	0–2

== Regular season ==
=== Season standings ===
West Division
Team	GP	W	L	T	PF	PA	Pts	
BC Lions	18	13	5	0	481	354	26	Details
Calgary Stampeders	18	12	6	0	534	431	24	Details
Saskatchewan Roughriders	18	8	10	0	457	409	16	Details
Edmonton Eskimos	18	7	11	0	422	450	14	Details

=== Season schedule ===
The Edmonton Eskimos clinched a playoff game against the Toronto Argonauts with an Argonauts victory and a Hamilton Tiger-Cats the night before, allowing the Eskimos team to cross-over into the East Divisional Playoffs. The Eskimos would go on to lose against the same Argonauts team that allowed them to clinch the last playoff spot in the CFL during the 2012 CFL season. Had the Hamilton Tiger-Cats beat the Toronto Argonauts lost, the Eskimos final game against Calgary on November 2 would have been a game where they needed to win or tie to clinch a playoff berth.

#	Date	Visitor	Score	Home	OT	Attendance	Record	Pts
1	Sat, June 30	Toronto Argonauts	15–19	Edmonton Eskimos		35,538	1–0	2
2	Sun, July 8	Edmonton Eskimos	1–17	Saskatchewan Roughriders		31,459	1–1	2
3	Fri, July 13	Winnipeg Blue Bombers	10–42	Edmonton Eskimos		32,067	2–1	4
4	Fri, July 20	Edmonton Eskimos	27–14	BC Lions		28,335	3–1	6
5	Thurs, July 26	Edmonton Eskimos	22–23	Winnipeg Blue Bombers		29,533	3–2	6
6	Bye						3–2	6
7	Fri, Aug 10	Saskatchewan Roughriders	20–28	Edmonton Eskimos		43,178	4–2	8
8	Fri, Aug 17	Montreal Alouettes	38–25	Edmonton Eskimos		32,760	4–3	8
9	Mon, Aug 27	Edmonton Eskimos	26–17	Toronto Argonauts		22,912	5–3	10
10	Mon, Sept 3	Edmonton Eskimos	30–31	Calgary Stampeders		32,102	5–4	10
11	Fri, Sept 7	Calgary Stampeders	20–18	Edmonton Eskimos		39,363	5–5	10
12	Sat, Sept 15	Edmonton Eskimos	8–51	Hamilton Tiger-Cats		24,162	5–6	10
13	Sat, Sept 22	BC Lions	19–18	Edmonton Eskimos		35,578	5–7	10
14	Fri, Sept 28	Edmonton Eskimos	15–39	Calgary Stampeders		29,290	5–8	10
15	Fri, Oct 5	Hamilton Tiger-Cats	20–35	Edmonton Eskimos		30,557	6–8	12
16	Sat, Oct 13	Saskatchewan Roughriders	20–37	Edmonton Eskimos		38,678	7–8	14
17	Fri, Oct 19	Edmonton Eskimos	19–39	BC Lions		30,102	7–9	14
18	Sun, Oct 28	Edmonton Eskimos	25–27	Montreal Alouettes		23,312	7–10	14
19	Fri, Nov 2	Calgary Stampeders	30–27	Edmonton Eskimos		21,147	7–11	14

Total attendance: 308,866
Average attendance: 34,318 (57.6%)

== Roster ==
2012 Edmonton Eskimos final roster
Quarterbacks: 5 Kerry Joseph; 3 Steven Jyles; 16 Matt Nichols; Running backs: 28 Cory Boyd; 7 Hugh Charles; 31 Calvin McCarty; Receivers: 86 Matt Carter; 17 Shamawd Chambers; 85 Nate Coehoorn; 89 Marcus Henry; 84 Cary Koch; 81 Glenn MacKay; 2 Fred Stamps	Offensive linemen: 61 Kyle Koch C; 67 Scott Mitchell G; 64 Matt O'Donnell T; 63 Brian Ramsay G; 62 Dylan Steenbergen T; 58 Devin Tyler T; Defensive linemen: 92 Justin Capicciotti DE; 91 Marcus Howard DE; 96 Brandon Lang DE; 94 Ted Laurent DT; 79 Shawn Lemon DE; 93 Don Oramasionwu DT	Linebackers: 49 Mike Cornell; 18 T. J. Hill; 48 Simoni Lawrence; 25 Mike Miller; 45 Damaso Munoz; 47 J. C. Sherritt; 46 Kyle Stewart; Defensive backs: 10 Donovan Alexander; 35 Weldon Brown; 22 Joe Burnett; 24 Delroy Clarke; 42 Clint Kent; 27 Ronnie Prude; 29 Chris Thompson; 37 Rod Williams	Special teams: 40 Mike Benson LS; 11 Grant Shaw K/P; Reserve roster: 30 Mathieu Bertrand FB; 14 Brody McKnight K/P; 90 Almondo Sewell DT; 66 Greg Wojt G; Practice roster: 8 Dobson Collins SB; 71 Terriun Crump WR; 83 Ed Grant WR; 87 Youssy Pierre WR; 41 Michael Ricks DB; 82 Steven Turner SB; 32 Bryan Williams DB	Injured list: 68 Joel Bell T; 4 Adarius Bowman SB; 18 Darcy Brown FB; 9 Burke Dales P; 34 Pascal Fils RB; 57 Gord Hinse C/T; 53 Ryan King LS; 95 Étienne Légaré DT; 19 Hugo Lopez DB; 6 Jeremiah Masoli QB; 23 Jerome Messam RB; 99 Jermaine Reid DT/DE; 56 Lee Robinson DE; 65 Simeon Rottier G; 80 Tyler Scott WR; 39 Corbin Sharun DB; 59 Dale Stevenson T; 44 Peter Thiel FB; 50 Orrin Thompson T; 75 Kade Weston DT; 97 Julius Williams DE; Italics indicate International player Roster updated 2026-05-02; Depth Chart • Transactions

== Coaching staff ==
2012 Edmonton Eskimos staff
Front office: President and ceo – Len Rhodes; Director of football operations – Vacant; General manager – Vacant; Assistant general manager and director of player personnel – Paul Jones; Manager of football operations and Canadian scouting – Vacant; Head scout – Edward Hervey; Head Canadian Scout - Rob Ralph; Head coaches: Head coach – Kavis Reed; Assistant Head Coach - Kit Lathrop; Offensive coaches: Offensive coordinator – Kavis Reed; Quarterbacks – Marcus Crandell; Run game coordinator and running backs – Jamie Barresi; Receivers – Derrell Mitchell; Offensive line – Tim Prinsen; Offensive consultant – David Kelly	Defensive coaches: Defensive coordinator and linebackers – Mark Nelson; Defensive line – Kit Lathrop; Defensive backs – Marcello Simmons; Defensive Assistant - Terry Eisler; Special teams coaches: Special teams coordinator – Marcello Simmons; Special Teams Assistant - Terry Eisler; Strength and conditioning: Strength and conditioning trainer – Mike Cook; → Coaching staff

== Playoffs ==
=== Schedule ===
Game	Date	Visitor	Score	Home	OT	Attendance	Result
East Semi-Final	Sun, Nov 11	Edmonton Eskimos	26–42	Toronto Argonauts		25,792	Loss

=== East Semi-Final ===
Edmonton at Toronto

Team	1	2	3	4	Total
Eskimos	7	0	3	16	26
• Argonauts	0	31	1	10	42

- Date: November 11
- Location: Rogers Centre
  Toronto, ON
- Game start: 11:00 AM MST
- Game attendance: 25,792
- Television network: TSN
