= 2011 Edmonton Eskimos season =

Canadian football team season

- General manager: Eric Tillman
- Head coach: Kavis Reed
- Home stadium: Commonwealth Stadium

Results
- Record: 11–7
- Division place: 2nd, West
- Playoffs: Lost West Final
- Team MOP: Ricky Ray, QB
- Team MOC: Jerome Messam, RB
- Team MOR: J. C. Sherritt, LB

Uniform

The 2011 Edmonton Eskimos season was the 54th season for the team in the Canadian Football League (CFL) and their 63rd overall. The Eskimos improved upon their 7–11 record from 2010, after winning their eighth game on October 10, 2011, while also securing a berth in the playoffs in that same game. The Eskimos finished in second place in the West Division with an 11–7 record and hosted a playoff game for the first time since 2004, ending the CFL's longest active drought. The Eskimos defeated their Alberta rivals, the Calgary Stampeders, 33–19 in the West Semi-Final, but lost to the BC Lions 40–23 in the West Final.

== Offseason ==
=== CFL draft ===
The 2011 CFL draft took place on Sunday, May 8, 2011. The Eskimos had four selections in the draft, with the first coming in the second spot overall. Edmonton was then able to select the number one ranked player in offensive linemen Scott Mitchell. After a trade with the Hamilton Tiger-Cats, the Eskimos acquired the fifth overall pick and selected Nathan Coehoorn, who was described as the most "pro-ready" receiver available in the draft. Edmonton also selected Ted Laurent in the 2011 supplemental draft, and must forfeit a second-round 2012 draft pick.

Round	Pick	Player	Position	School/Club team
1	2	Scott Mitchell	OL	Rice
1	5	Nathan Coehoorn	WR	Calgary
2	14	Hugo Lopez	DB	Toronto
6	46	Youssy Pierre	WR	Montréal

=== Notable transactions ===
Date	Type	Incoming	Outgoing	Team
March 15, 2011	Trade	Delroy Clarke (DB)	4th round pick in 2012 CFL draft – Quincy Hurst (WR)	Toronto Argonauts
March 17, 2011	Trade	Taylor Inglis (LS)	*5th round pick in 2011 CFL draft – Carl Volny (RB); 6th round pick in 2011 CFL draft – Liam Mahoney (WR)	Winnipeg Blue Bombers
March 18, 2011	Trade	LaDarius Key (DB)	Tristan Jackson (KR/DB)	Saskatchewan Roughriders
March 21, 2011	Trade	Dalin Tollestrup (DB); **2nd round pick in 2011 CFL draft – Maurice Forbes (DT)	Justin Medlock (K); Carlos Thomas (DB); ***3rd round pick in 2011 CFL draft – Djems Kouame (WR); 5th round pick in 2011 CFL draft – Patrick Jean-Mary (LB)	Hamilton Tiger-Cats
May 6, 2011	Trade	Lavar Glover (DB)	Future considerations	Winnipeg Blue Bombers
May 8, 2011	Trade	Zipp Duncan (OL); 1st round pick in 2011 CFL draft – Nathan Coehoorn (WR)	2nd round pick in 2011 CFL draft – Moe Petrus (OL); 2nd round pick in 2011 CFL draft – Maurice Forbes (DT)	Hamilton Tiger-Cats
May 8, 2011	Trade	2nd round pick in 2011 CFL draft – Hugo Lopez (DB)	Brian Bulcke (DL)	Calgary Stampeders
May 8, 2011	Trade	6th round pick in 2011 CFL draft – Youssy Pierre (WR)	Graeme Bell (FB)	Saskatchewan Roughriders
June 15, 2011	Trade	Stefan Rodgers (OL)	Future considerations	Hamilton Tiger-Cats
June 18, 2011	Trade	Junius Coston (OL); 6th round pick in 2013 CFL draft - Elie Ngoyi (DE)	6th round pick in 2013 CFL draft - Shane Bergman (OL)	Calgary Stampeders
June 19, 2011	Trade	Jerome Messam (RB)	3rd round pick in 2013 CFL draft - Boseko Lokombo (LB)	BC Lions
August 23, 2011	Trade	Dylan Steenbergen (OL); Future considerations	6th round pick in 2012 CFL draft – Ryan White (OL); 6th round pick in 2013 CFL draft - Simon Legare (OL)	Montreal Alouettes
October 12, 2011	Trade	Hugh Charles (RB)	5th round pick in 2014 CFL draft - Matt Webster (DB)	Saskatchewan Roughriders

*Later traded back to the Winnipeg Blue Bombers
**Later traded back to the Hamilton Tiger-Cats
***Later traded to the Toronto Argonauts

== Preseason ==
#	Date	Visitor	Score	Home	OT	Attendance	Record
A	Fri, June 17	Edmonton Eskimos	22–23	Saskatchewan Roughriders		29,130	0–1
B	Fri, June 24	Calgary Stampeders	37–22	Edmonton Eskimos		32,796	0–2

== Regular season ==
=== Season standings ===
West Division
Team	GP	W	L	T	PF	PA	Pts	
BC Lions	18	11	7	0	511	385	22	Details
Edmonton Eskimos	18	11	7	0	427	401	22	Details
Calgary Stampeders	18	11	7	0	511	476	22	Details
Saskatchewan Roughriders	18	5	13	0	346	482	10	Details

=== Season schedule ===
#	Date	Visitor	Score	Home	OT	Attendance	Record	Pts
1	Sun, July 3	Edmonton Eskimos	42–28	Saskatchewan Roughriders		30,048	1–0	2
2	Sat, July 9	Hamilton Tiger-Cats	10–28	Edmonton Eskimos		26,059	2–0	4
3	Sat, July 16	BC Lions	17–33	Edmonton Eskimos		32,297	3–0	6
4	Sat, July 23	Edmonton Eskimos	24–19	Calgary Stampeders		29,910	4–0	8
5	Fri, July 29	Toronto Argonauts	25–26	Edmonton Eskimos		32,478	5–0	10
6	Fri, Aug 5	Edmonton Eskimos	16–28	Winnipeg Blue Bombers		29,533	5–1	10
7	Thurs, Aug 11	Edmonton Eskimos	4–27	Montreal Alouettes		24,448	5–2	10
8	Fri, Aug 19	BC Lions	36–1	Edmonton Eskimos		35,216	5–3	10
9	Bye						5–3	10
10	Mon, Sept 5	Edmonton Eskimos	35–7	Calgary Stampeders		35,650	6–3	12
11	Fri, Sept 9	Calgary Stampeders	30–20	Edmonton Eskimos		45,672	6–4	12
12	Fri, Sept 16	Edmonton Eskimos	38–23	Hamilton Tiger-Cats		22,654	7–4	14
13	Fri, Sept 23	Montreal Alouettes	34–21	Edmonton Eskimos		40,274	7–5	14
14	Fri, Sept 30	Edmonton Eskimos	24–33	BC Lions		50,213	7–6	14
15	Mon, Oct 10	Saskatchewan Roughriders	1–17	Edmonton Eskimos		38,054	8–6	16
16	Sat, Oct 15	Winnipeg Blue Bombers	10–24	Edmonton Eskimos		30,734	9–6	18
17	Fri, Oct 21	Edmonton Eskimos	31–24	Toronto Argonauts		19,176	10–6	20
18	Sat, Oct 29	Edmonton Eskimos	20–29	BC Lions		29,749	10–7	20
19	Fri, Nov 4	Saskatchewan Roughriders	20–23	Edmonton Eskimos		30,845	11–7	22

Total attendance: 311,629
Average attendance: 34,625 (58.2%)

== Roster ==
2011 Edmonton Eskimos final roster
Quarterbacks: 5 Kerry Joseph; 15 Ricky Ray; 13 Eric Ward; Running backs: 30 Mathieu Bertrand; 7 Hugh Charles; 31 Calvin McCarty; Receivers: 6 Jason Armstead; 81 Jason Barnes; 4 Adarius Bowman; 85 Nate Coehoorn; 88 Andrew Nowacki; 80 Tyler Scott; 2 Fred Stamps	Offensive linemen: 57 Gord Hinse C/T; 56 Patrick Kabongo G; 67 Scott Mitchell G; 65 Chris Patrick T; 63 Brian Ramsay G/T; 62 Dylan Steenbergen G/T; 58 Devin Tyler T; Defensive linemen: 91 Marcus Howard DE; 94 Ted Laurent NT; 95 Étienne Légaré NT/DE; 99 Jermaine Reid DE; 97 Julius Williams DE	Linebackers: 49 Mike Cornell; 40 Rod Davis; 18 T. J. Hill; 44 Mike Miller; 45 Damaso Munoz; 90 Greg Peach; Defensive backs: 10 Donovan Alexander; 9 Jykine Bradley; 35 Weldon Brown; 11 Delroy Clarke; 19 Hugo Lopez; 39 Corbin Sharun; 29 Chris Thompson; 37 Rod Williams	Special teams: 38 Damon Duval K/P; 52 Taylor Inglis LS; 17 Derek Schiavone K; Reserve roster: 34 Pascal Fils RB; 33 Wopamo Osaisai DB; 93 Lee Robinson DE; Practice roster: 22 Joe Burnett DB; 8 Dobson Collins SB; 36 John Goebel RB; 14 Ludovic Kashindi DB; 74 Youssy Pierre WR; 59 Dale Stevenson T	Injured list: 87 Chris Bauman WR (1 Game); 64 Junius Coston G (1 Game); 51 Aaron Fiacconi C (9 Game); 28 Samuel Fournier FB (9 Game); 71 Marcus Henry WR (1 Game); 61 Kyle Koch G/C (9 Game); 23 Jerome Messam RB (1 Game); 16 Matt Nichols QB (9 Game); 20 David Pittman DB (1 Game); 44 Mark Restelli LB (1 Game); 96 Dee Sterling DT (1 Game); 48 Joe Sykes DE (9 Game); 66 Greg Wojt T/G (1 Game); Italics indicate International player Roster updated 2026-05-02; Depth Chart • Transactions

== Coaching staff ==
2011 Edmonton Eskimos staff
Front office: President and ceo – Rick LeLacheur; Director of football operations – Vacant; General manager – Eric Tillman; Assistant general manager and director of player personnel – Paul Jones; Manager of football operations and canadian scouting – Dan McKinnon; Head scout – Ed Hervey; Head coaches: Head coach – Kavis Reed; Assistant head coach – Rick Campbell; Offensive coaches: Offensive coordinator and quarterbacks – Marcus Crandell; Running backs – Dennis McKnight; Receivers – Steff Kruck; Offensive line – Tim Prinsen; Offensive assistant and video coordinator – Rob Ralph	Defensive coaches: Defensive coordinator and defensive backs – Rich Stubler; Linebackers – Mark Nelson; Defensive line – Kit Lathrop; Special teams coaches: Special teams coordinator – Rick Campbell; Strength and conditioning: Strength and conditioning trainer – Mike Cook; → Coaching staff

== Playoffs ==
=== Schedule ===
Game	Date	Visitor	Score	Home	OT	Attendance	Result
West Semi-Final	Sun, Nov 13	Calgary Stampeders	19–33	Edmonton Eskimos		30,183	Win
West Final	Sun, Nov 20	Edmonton Eskimos	23–40	BC Lions		41,313	Loss

=== Bracket ===
November 13: Division Semi-Finals
East
E3	Hamilton Tiger-Cats	52*
E2	Montreal Alouettes	44
West
W3	Calgary Stampeders	19
W2	Edmonton Eskimos	33

November 20: Division Finals
E3	Hamilton Tiger-Cats	3
E1	Winnipeg Blue Bombers	19
W2	Edmonton Eskimos	23
W1	BC Lions	40

November 27: 99th Grey Cup; BC Place Stadium – Vancouver
E1	Winnipeg Blue Bombers	23
W1	BC Lions	34

*-Team won in Overtime.

=== West Semi-Final ===
Calgary at Edmonton

Team	1	2	3	4	Total
Stampeders	8	1	6	4	19
• Eskimos	3	22	1	7	33

- Date: November 13
- Location: Commonwealth Stadium
  Edmonton, AB
- Game start: 2:30 PM MST
- Game attendance: 30,183
- Game weather: Cloudy; 3°C; wind 32 km/h W
- Referee: Murray Clarke
- TV announcers (TSN): Rod Black (Play by Play), Duane Forde (Colour)

=== West Final ===
Edmonton at BC

Team	1	2	3	4	Total
Eskimos	0	3	6	14	23
• Lions	6	20	7	7	40

- Date: November 20
- Location: BC Place Stadium
  Vancouver, BC
- Game start: 2:30 PM MST
- Game attendance: 41,313
- Game weather: None (Retractable roof closed)
- Referee: Glen Johnson
- TV announcers (TSN): Chris Cuthbert (Play by Play), Glen Suitor (Colour)
