= 2013 Edmonton Eskimos season =

Canadian football team season

- General manager: Ed Hervey
- Head coach: Kavis Reed
- Home stadium: Commonwealth Stadium

Results
- Record: 4–14
- Division place: 4th, West
- Playoffs: did not qualify
- Team MOP: Fred Stamps, SB
- Team MOC: Shamawd Chambers, WR
- Team MOR: Eric Samuels, LB

Uniform
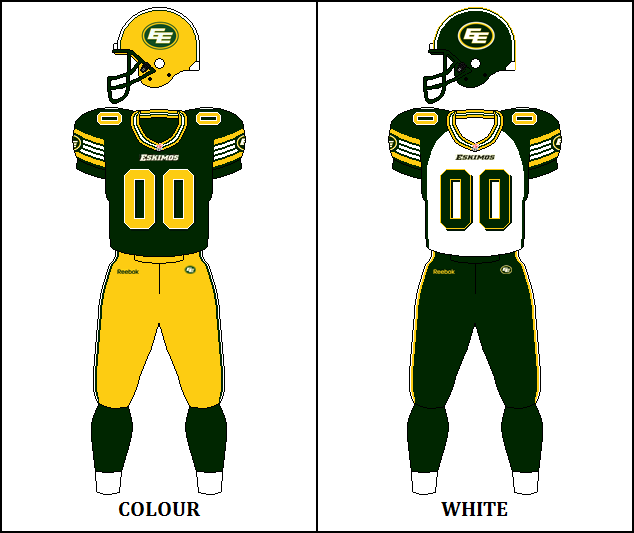

The 2013 Edmonton Eskimos season was the 56th season for the team in the Canadian Football League (CFL) and their 65th overall. The Eskimos finished the season in fourth place in the West Division with a 4–14 record and failed to make the playoffs.

== Offseason ==
=== CFL draft ===
The 2013 CFL draft took place on May 6, 2013. The Eskimos had seven selections in the seven-round draft after trading their first round pick to Montreal for Brody McKnight and acquiring additional third and fourth round picks.

Round	Pick	Player	Position	School/Club team
2	10	Stefan Charles	DT	Regina
3	24	Kyle Norris	LB	Saint Mary's
3	26	Christopher Mercer	OL	Regina
4	31	Jorgen Hus	LB	Regina
4	34	Taylor Servais	OL	Ottawa
6	51	Elie Ngoyi	DE	Bishop's
7	55	Smith Wright	FB	Alberta

=== Notable transactions ===
Date	Type	Incoming	Outgoing	Team
January 31, 2013	Trade	Mike Reilly (QB); *2nd round pick in 2013 CFL draft - Brent Urban (DL)	2nd round pick in 2013 CFL draft - Seydou Junior Haidara (WR); 2nd round pick in 2014 CFL draft - Tchissakid Player (OL)	BC Lions
February 5, 2013	Trade	**6th round pick in 2013 CFL draft - Thomas Spoletini (LB)	Jerome Messam (RB)	Montreal Alouettes
February 5, 2013	Trade	Nathan Kanya (LB); Carson Rockhill (OL)	Greg Wojt (OL); Jeremiah Masoli (QB); Simoni Lawrence (LB)	Hamilton Tiger-Cats
February 27, 2013	Trade	2nd round pick in 2013 CFL draft - Stefan Charles (DT); 3rd round pick in 2013 CFL draft - Kyle Norris (LB)	Hasan Hazime (DL); 2nd round pick in 2013 CFL draft - Brent Urban (DL)	Hamilton Tiger-Cats
March 1, 2013	Trade	***5th round pick in 2013 CFL draft - Alex Anthony (WR); ***5th round pick in 2013 CFL draft - Levi Steinhauer (DL)	Brody McKnight (P/K); 6th round pick in 2013 CFL draft - Thomas Spoletini (LB)	Saskatchewan Roughriders
March 22, 2013	Trade	3rd round pick in 2013 CFL draft - Christopher Mercer (OL)	Jermaine Reid (DL); ***5th round pick in 2013 CFL draft - Alex Anthony (WR); ***5th round pick in 2013 CFL draft - Levi Steinhauer (DL)	Toronto Argonauts
May 6, 2013	Trade	4th round pick in 2013 CFL draft - Taylor Servais (OL)	Étienne Légaré (DT)	Calgary Stampeders

*Later traded to the Hamilton Tiger-Cats
**Later traded to the Saskatchewan Roughriders
***Later traded back to the Saskatchewan Roughriders

== Preseason ==
#	Date	Visitor	Score	Home	OT	Attendance	Record
A	Fri, June 14	Saskatchewan Roughriders	31–24	Edmonton Eskimos		26,623	0–1
B	Fri, June 21	Edmonton Eskimos	27–22	BC Lions		26,733	1–1

== Regular season ==
=== Season standings ===
West Division
Team	GP	W	L	T	PF	PA	Pts	
Calgary Stampeders	18	14	4	0	549	413	28	Details
Saskatchewan Roughriders	18	11	7	0	519	398	22	Details
BC Lions	18	11	7	0	504	461	22	Details
Edmonton Eskimos	18	4	14	0	421	519	8	Details

=== Season schedule ===
#	Date	Visitor	Score	Home	OT	Attendance	Record	Pts	TV
1	Sat, June 29	Saskatchewan Roughriders	39–18	Edmonton Eskimos		35,869	0–1	0	TSN/ESPN2
2	Sun, July 7	Edmonton Eskimos	30–20	Hamilton Tiger-Cats		12,612	1–1	2	TSN/RDS2/ESPN3
3	Sat, July 13	BC Lions	17–3	Edmonton Eskimos		31,310	1–2	2	TSN/RDS2/ESPN2
4	Sat, July 20	Edmonton Eskimos	21–31	BC Lions		26,623	1–3	2	TSN/RDS2/ESPN3
5	Thurs, July 25	Edmonton Eskimos	27–32	Montreal Alouettes		23,021	1–4	2	TSN/RDS/ESPN3
6	Fri, Aug 2	Hamilton Tiger-Cats	30–29	Edmonton Eskimos		31,006	1–5	2	TSN/RDS2/NBCSN
7	Bye								
8	Sun, Aug 18	Edmonton Eskimos	33–36	Toronto Argonauts		19,656	1–6	2	TSN/RDS2/ESPN3
9	Sat, Aug 24	Saskatchewan Roughriders	30–27	Edmonton Eskimos		41,868	1–7	2	TSN/ESPN3
10	Mon, Sept 2	Edmonton Eskimos	34–37	Calgary Stampeders		32,217	1–8	2	TSN/NBCSN
11	Fri, Sept 6	Calgary Stampeders	22–12	Edmonton Eskimos		33,654	1–9	2	TSN/RDS2/NBCSN
12	Sat, Sept 14	Winnipeg Blue Bombers	7–25	Edmonton Eskimos		29,499	2–9	4	TSN/ESPN3
13	Fri, Sept 20	Edmonton Eskimos	35–27	Winnipeg Blue Bombers	OT	28,859	3–9	6	TSN/RDS2/ESPN2
14	Sat, Sept 28	Toronto Argonauts	34–22	Edmonton Eskimos		29,569	3–10	6	TSN/RDS2/ESPN3
15	Sat, Oct 5	Montreal Alouettes	47–24	Edmonton Eskimos		28,455	3–11	6	TSN/RDS/ESPN3
16	Sat, Oct 12	Edmonton Eskimos	9–14	Saskatchewan Roughriders		35,579	3–12	6	TSN/ESPN3
17	Fri, Oct 18	Calgary Stampeders	27–13	Edmonton Eskimos		27,633	3–13	6	TSN/NBCSN
18	Fri, Oct 25	Edmonton Eskimos	29–43	BC Lions		24,545	3–14	6	TSN/ESPN3
19	Sat, Nov 2	Edmonton Eskimos	30–26	Saskatchewan Roughriders		32,701	4–14	8	TSN/RDS2/ESPN3

Total attendance: 288,863
Average attendance: 32,096 (57.0%, capacity 56,302)

== Roster ==
2013 Edmonton Eskimos final roster
Quarterbacks: 14 Jonathan Crompton; 5 Kerry Joseph; 13 Mike Reilly; Running backs: 7 Hugh Charles; 31 Calvin McCarty; 30 John White; Receivers: 88 Kemonte' Bateman; 4 Adarius Bowman; 86 Matt Carter; 17 Shamawd Chambers; 85 Nate Coehoorn; 3 Jamal Miles; 82 Carlton Mitchell	Offensive linemen: 68 Thaddeus Coleman T; 57 Gord Hinse C/T; 69 Miles Mason G; 59 Tyrone Novikoff T; 66 Matt O'Donnell T/G; 63 Brian Ramsay C/G; 65 Simeon Rottier G; Defensive linemen: 92 Justin Capicciotti DE; 91 Marcus Howard DE; 94 Ted Laurent DT; 90 Almondo Sewell DT; 97 Eddie Steele DT; 41 Odell Willis DE	Linebackers: 35 Rennie Curran; 44 Joash Gesse; 18 T. J. Hill; 46 Nathan Kanya; 45 Damaso Munoz; 48 Kyle Norris; 26 Donovan Richard; Defensive backs: 10 Donovan Alexander; 22 Joe Burnett; 36 Aaron Grymes; 34 Ryan Hinds; 25 Mike Miller; 38 Eric Samuels; 23 Marcell Young	Special teams: 53 Ryan King LS; 18 Hugh O'Neill K; 11 Grant Shaw K/P; Reserve roster: 58 Cliff Louis T; 55 Elie Ngoyi DE; 93 Don Oramasionwu DT; 39 Corbin Sharun DB; Practice roster: 95 Gregory Alexandre DT; 40 Mike Benson LS; 8 Josh Gatlin DB; 81 Keith Gooding WR; 6 Jacory Harris QB; 83 Jamar Howard WR; 62 Christopher Mercer T; 43 Shea Pierre DB; 28 Robbie Rouse RB	Injured list: 49 Mike Cornell LB; 9 Burke Dales P; 89 Marcus Henry WR; 84 Cary Koch WR; 54 Alexander Krausnick C; 96 Brandon Lang DE; 67 Scott Mitchell G; 16 Matt Nichols QB; 15 Chris Rwabukamba DB; 47 J. C. Sherritt LB; 2 Fred Stamps SB; 29 Chris Thompson DB; 50 Orrin Thompson T; Italics indicate International player
