= Kris Sweet =

American gridiron football coach

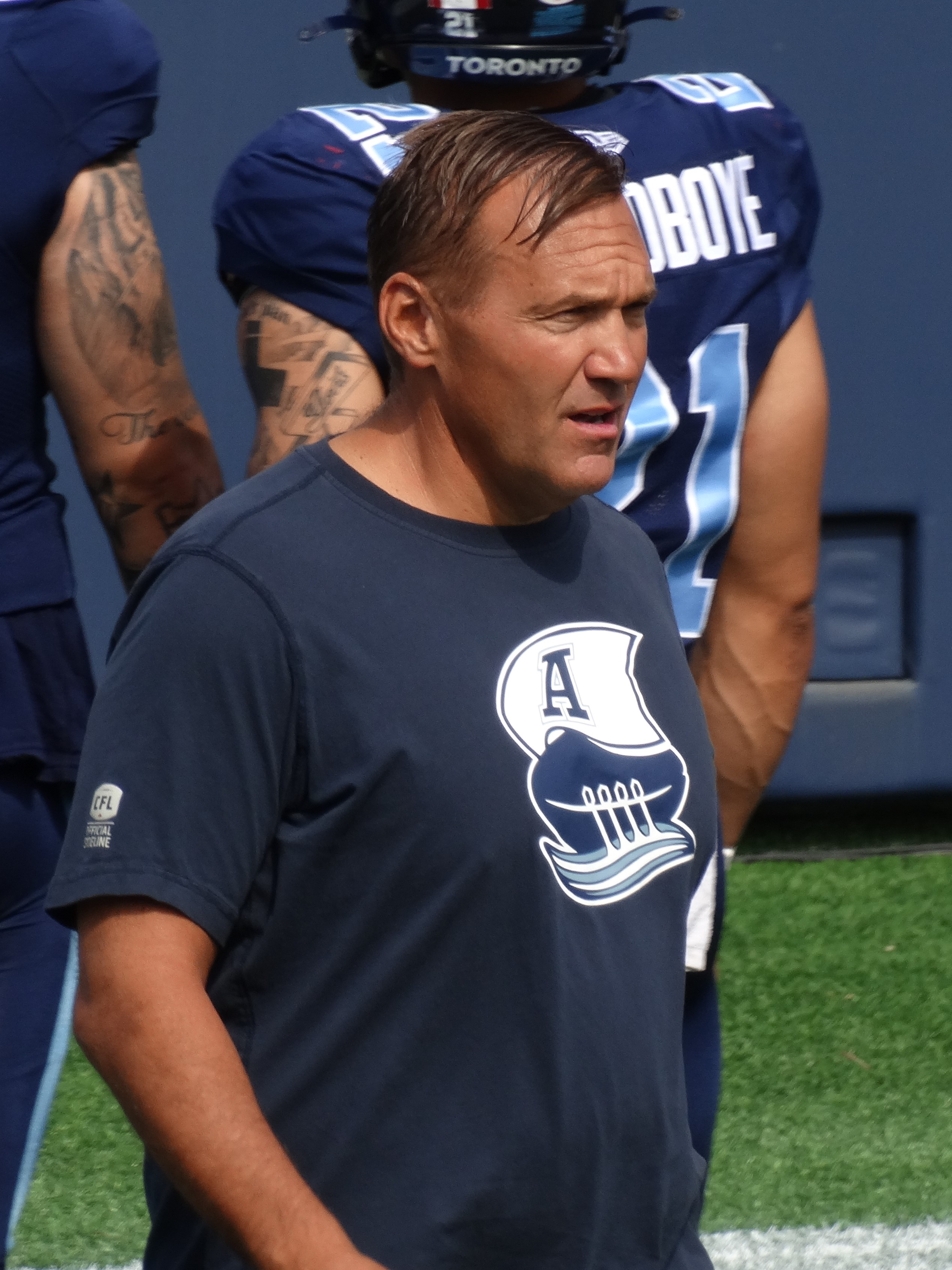
- Sweet with the Toronto Argonauts in 2022

Toronto Argonauts
- Title: Offensive line coach

Personal information
- Born: Salem, Virginia, U.S.

Career information
- College: Carson-Newman

Career history
- 1997: Tennessee Tech Golden Eagles (Offensive assistant coach)
- 1998: Holy Cross Crusaders (Assistant offensive line coach)
- 1999: Elon Phoenix (Defensive ends coach)
- 2000: Presbyterian Blue Hose (Tight ends/fullbacks coach)
- 2001–2004: Presbyterian Blue Hose (Offensive line coach)
- 2003–2004: Presbyterian Blue Hose (Offensive coordinator)
- 2005: Kentucky State Thorobreds (Offensive line coach)
- 2006: Columbia Lions (Offensive line coach)
- 2007–2011: Calgary Stampeders (Offensive line coach)
- 2012: Saskatchewan Roughriders (Run game coordinator, Offensive line coach)
- 2013: Edmonton Eskimos (Offensive line coach)
- 2014–2016: Montreal Alouettes (Offensive line coach)
- 2018: Norfolk State Spartans (Offensive line coach)
- 2019: Lyon Scots (Offensive coordinator)
- 2021: Howard Bison (Offensive line coach)
- 2022–present: Toronto Argonauts (Offensive line coach)

Awards and highlights
- 3× Grey Cup champion (2008, 2022, 2024)

Kris Sweet is a professional gridiron football coach who is the offensive line coach for the Toronto Argonauts of the Canadian Football League (CFL). He is a three-time Grey Cup champion as an assistant coach after winning with the Calgary Stampeders in 2008 and with the Argonauts in 2022 and 2024.

== College career ==
Sweet played college football as a center for the Carson–Newman Eagles and earned his bachelor's degree in physical education in 1996 and his master's degree in education in 1998.

== Coaching career ==
=== College football ===
Sweet began his coaching career as an offensive graduate assistant for the Tennessee Tech Golden Eagles in 1997. Following stints with the Holy Cross Crusaders in 1998 and the Elon Phoenix in 1999, he joined the Presbyterian Blue Hose in 2000 as the team's tight ends coach and fullbacks coach. In 2001, he became the offensive line coach for the Blue Hose and then was named offensive coordinator in 2003. He added the titles of recruiting coordinator and academic coordinator in 2003. In 2005, Sweet joined the Kentucky State Thorobreds staff as the team's offensive line coach and then moved to the Columbia Lions in 2006 in the same capacity.

=== Calgary Stampeders ===
On February 16, 2007, it was announced that Sweet had joined the Calgary Stampeders to serve as team's offensive line coach, which marked his first foray into professional football. He was retained in 2008 by new head coach John Hufnagel and Sweet won his first Grey Cup championship following the Stampeders' victory in the 96th Grey Cup game.

=== Saskatchewan Roughriders ===
On January 3, 2012, Sweet was named the run game coordinator and offensive line coach for the Saskatchewan Roughriders. However, he was with the team for only one season as he was dismissed at the end of the year.

=== Edmonton Eskimos ===
On February 11, 2013, the Edmonton Eskimos announced that Sweet had joined their coaching staff to serve as the team's offensive line coach. After head coach Kavis Reed was fired following the 2013 season, Sweet was not retained by incoming head coach Chris Jones.

=== Montreal Alouettes ===
On March 6, 2014, it was announced that Sweet had joined the Montreal Alouettes as the team's offensive line coach, reuniting him with head coach Tom Higgins who had first hired him into the CFL in 2007. He was with the team for three years under three different head coaches.

=== College football (II) ===
Sweet returned to the American college ranks in 2018 when he was named the offensive line coach for the Norfolk State Spartans. In 2019, he joined the Lyon Scots as the team's offensive coordinator, but his tenure was cut short after he was diagnosed with Non-Hodgkin lymphoma. After recovering, he joined the Howard Bison in 2021 to serve as their offensive line coach.

=== Toronto Argonauts ===
It was announced on January 19, 2022, that Sweet had joined the Toronto Argonauts as their offensive line coach. In his first year, the Argonauts won the 109th Grey Cup and Sweet won his second championship. In 2024, the Argonauts defeated the Winnipeg Blue Bombers in the 111th Grey Cup and he won his third Grey Cup.

== Personal life ==
Sweet and his wife, Kate, have two children, Alex and Megan.
