= BBSS =

BBSS may refer to:

- Beaver Brae Secondary School, a secondary school in Kenora, Ontario, Canada
- Bukit Batok Secondary School, a secondary school in Bukit Batok, Singapore
