= Fred Stamps =

American gridiron football player (born 1980)

Personal information
- Born: December 10, 1980 (age 45); New Orleans, Louisiana, U.S.
- Listed height: 6 ft 0 in (1.83 m)
- Listed weight: 190 lb (86 kg)

Career information
- Position: Slotback (No. 2, 13)
- High school: G. W. Carver
- College: Louisiana–Lafayette

Career history
- 2004: San Francisco 49ers*
- 2004: Jacksonville Jaguars*
- 2004–2005: Baltimore Ravens*
- 2005–2006: Jacksonville Jaguars*
- 2007–2014: Edmonton Eskimos
- 2015: Montreal Alouettes
- * Offseason or practice squad member only

Awards and highlights
- 4× CFL All-Star (2009, 2011–2013); 5× CFL West All-Star (2009–2013); 2× Eskimos' Most Outstanding Player (2009, 2010); 2× First-team All-Sun Belt (2002, 2003)
- Stats at CFL.ca

Fred Stamps (born December 10, 1980) is an American former professional football slotback who most notably played for nine years in the Canadian Football League (CFL) primarily with the Edmonton Eskimos. He is a four-time CFL All-Star and a five-time Division All-Star and twice led the league in receiving yards. He played college football at UL Lafayette. Stamps was also a member of the Jacksonville Jaguars, Baltimore Ravens, San Francisco 49ers, and Montreal Alouettes.

== Early life ==
Stamps attended George Washington Carver High School in the 9th Ward of New Orleans, LA—class of 2000.

== College career ==
Stamps played college football for the Louisiana–Lafayette Ragin' Cajuns from 2000 to 2003. Stamps also played track and field and baseball.

== Professional career ==
=== National Football League ===
In 2004, Stamps was signed by the San Francisco 49ers as an undrafted free agent. Following his release by the 49ers, Stamps spent time on the practice squads for both the Baltimore Ravens and the Jacksonville Jaguars.

=== Edmonton Eskimos ===
On November 22, 2006, Stamps signed with the Edmonton Eskimos. In his first season in the CFL in 2007, he played in nine games, starting in seven, (he missed five games because of appendectomy surgery) where he had 28 catches for 289 yards, four kick returns for 72 yards, and two missed field goal returns for 95 yards. In the following year, Stamps played in 14 games, missing four due to a leg injury, where he amassed 751 receiving yards from 50 receptions while scoring six touchdowns. He signed a two-year contract extension on January 29, 2009.

In the 2009 season, Stamps played in all 18 games where he recorded 85 catches for 1,402 yards and eight touchdowns. In 2010, he suffered a shoulder injury and missed four games, but still managed to catch 80 passes for 1,223 yards and five touchdowns. Stamps added a third consecutive 1,000–yard season in the 2011 campaign, amassing 1,153 yards and eight touchdowns on 82 receptions; despite missing a couple of weeks because of a serious injury to his testicles. In 2012, Stamps played in all 18 games of the regular season and finished second in receiving yards with 1,310 and fourth in receiving touchdowns with nine. Stamps lead the league in receiving yards in the 2013 season with 1,259 yards.

=== Montreal Alouettes ===
Stamps was traded to the Montreal Alouettes in exchange for Kenny Stafford on January 16, 2015. He played in 16 games in 2015 where he had 40 catches for 479 yards and five touchdowns. Stamps was released from the Alouettes on January 25, 2016.

=== Retirement ===
On April 2, 2019, Stamps signed a one-day contract with the Eskimos to officially retire from professional football as a member of the team. He retired third all-time on the Eskimos' career receptions list with 496 and second in career receiving yards with 7,932 yards.

== Statistics ==
| Receiving | | Regular season | | | | | | Playoffs |
| Year | Team | Games | No. | Yards | Avg | Long | TD | Games | No. | Yards | Avg | Long | TD |
|---|---|---|---|---|---|---|---|---|---|---|---|---|---|
| 2007 | EDM | 9 | 28 | 289 | 10.3 | 21 | 0 | Team did not qualify |
| 2008 | EDM | 14 | 50 | 751 | 15.0 | 46 | 6 | 2 | 3 | 67 | 22.3 | 29 | 0 |
| 2009 | EDM | 18 | 85 | 1,402 | 16.5 | 63 | 8 | 1 | 4 | 76 | 19.0 | 28 | 0 |
| 2010 | EDM | 14 | 80 | 1,223 | 15.3 | 51 | 5 | Team did not qualify |
| 2011 | EDM | 15 | 82 | 1,153 | 14.1 | 75 | 8 | 2 | 7 | 88 | 12.6 | 25 | 1 |
| 2012 | EDM | 18 | 70 | 1,310 | 18.7 | 95 | 9 | 1 | 3 | 51 | 17.0 | 46 | 0 |
| 2013 | EDM | 15 | 68 | 1,259 | 18.5 | 51 | 11 | Team did not qualify |
| 2014 | EDM | 14 | 33 | 545 | 16.5 | 54 | 2 | 2 | 2 | 27 | 13.5 | 17 | 0 |
| 2015 | MTL | 16 | 40 | 479 | 12.0 | 54 | 5 | Team did not qualify |
| CFL totals | | 133 | 536 | 8,411 | 15.7 | 95 | 54 | 8 | 19 | 309 | 16.3 | 46 | 1 |
