= Tucker High School =

Public high school in Tucker, Georgia, United States

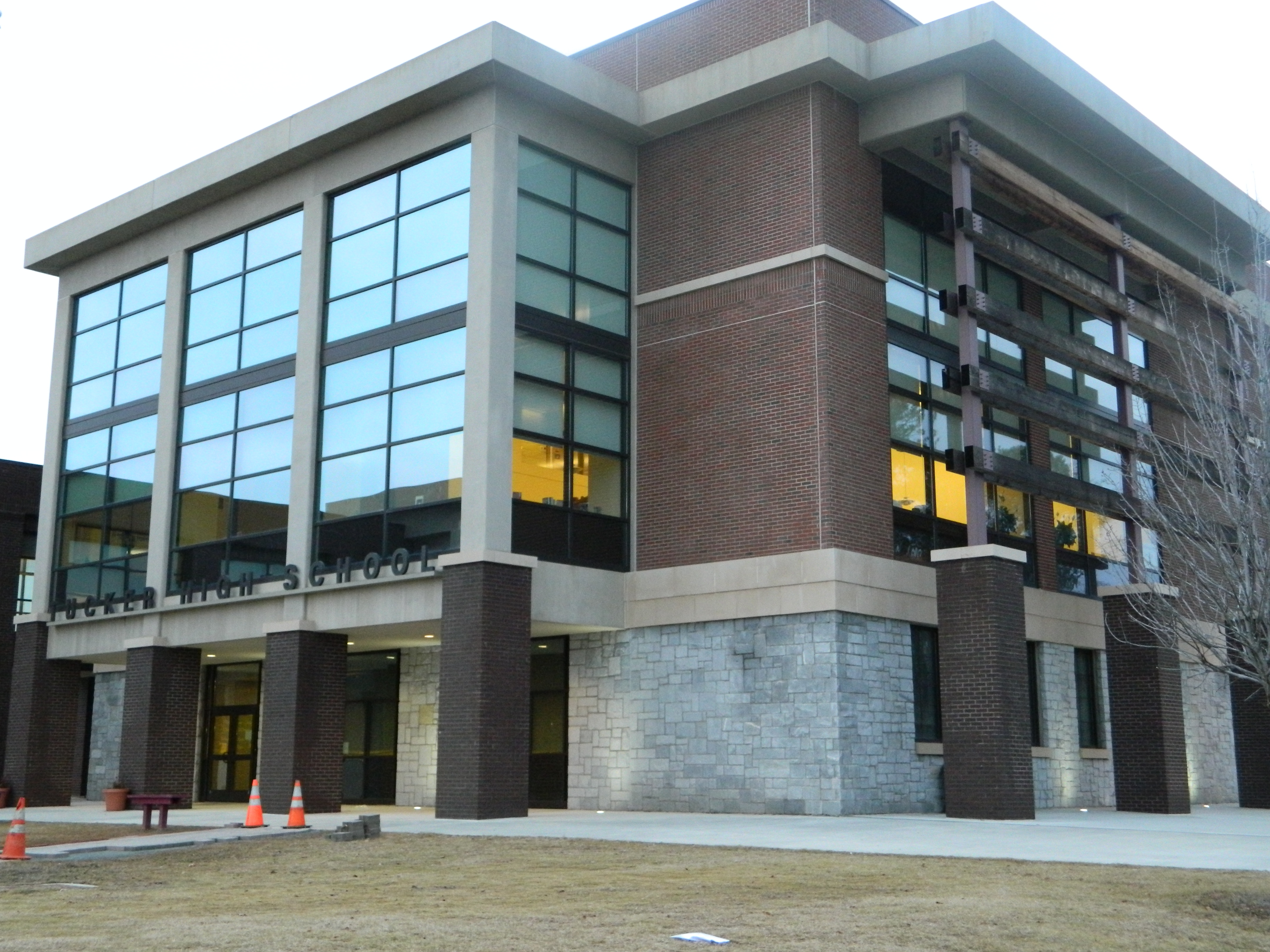

Location
- 5036 LaVista Road; Tucker, Georgia 30084; United States; 33°51′22″N 84°12′58″W

Information
- Type: Public
- Established: 1918
- Locale: Suburban, Large
- School district: DeKalb County School System
- NCES District ID: 1301740
- NCES School ID: 130174000669
- Principal: Eric Parker
- Teaching staff: 109.00 (on an FTE basis)
- Grades: 9–12
- Enrollment: 1,614 (2024–25)
- Student to teacher ratio: 14.81
- Colors: Maroon and gold
- Mascot: Tom the Tiger
- Nickname: Tigers
- Accreditation: AdvancED
- Website: tuckerhs.dekalb.k12.ga.us

Tucker High School is the only public high school in Tucker, a city in DeKalb County, Georgia, United States. It is operated by the DeKalb County School District. Its student body consists of over 1,600 students.

Tucker High's boundary includes a section of the City of Clarkston.

== Academics ==
On December 17, 2012, the Southern Association of Colleges and Schools announced that it had downgraded the DeKalb County School District's status from "on advisement" to "on probation" and warned the school system that the loss of their accreditation was "imminent." AdvancED/SACS upgraded the district's status to "Accredited Advisement" in February 2015.

== Notable alumni ==
- Brendan O'Brien (1978) – record producer, mixer, engineer, and musician.
- Thomas Brown (2004) – former professional football player
- Brandon Lang (2004) – former professional football player
- Asher Allen (2006) – former professional football player
- Dwayne Harris (2006) – former professional football player
- MarShon Brooks (2007) – professional basketball player
- Jamoris Slaughter (2008) – former professional football player
- Neiko Thorpe (2008) – former professional football player
- A. J. Bouye (2009) – professional football player, Carolina Panthers
- Seantavius Jones (2010) – former professional football player
- James Vaughters (2011) – professional football player, Atlanta Falcons
- Bryce Brown (2015) - basketball player in the Israeli Basketball Premier League
- Jonathan Ledbetter (2015) – professional football player, Arizona Cardinals
- Duke Shelley (2015) – professional football player, Chicago Bears
- Terrence Edwards Jr. (2020) – basketball player
