= Corbin Sharun =

Canadian football player (born 1988)

No. 47
- Position: Linebacker

Personal information
- Born: September 6, 1988 (age 38); Edmonton, Alberta, Canada
- Listed height: 6 ft 0 in (1.83 m)
- Listed weight: 220 lb (100 kg)

Career information
- High school: Strathcona
- CJFL: Edmonton Wildcats
- University: St. Francis Xavier
- CFL draft: 2010: 6th round, 43rd overall pick

Career history
- 2010–2014: Edmonton Eskimos
- 2015–2016: Calgary Stampeders
- Stats at CFL.ca

Corbin Sharun (born September 6, 1988) is a Canadian former professional football defensive back and special teams specialist. He was drafted by the Edmonton Eskimos in 2010, where he played for five seasons. He played college football for the St. Francis Xavier University X-Men and junior football for the Edmonton Wildcats.

== Early career ==
Sharun was born in Edmonton, Alberta. He played high school football at Strathcona Composite High School as a quarterback, winning three consecutive city championships. He continued as a quarterback for the X-Men at St. Francis Xavier University from 2006 to 2007. In his freshman year, Sharun started three games before serving as a backup for the majority of his remaining time there. After discovering his father had colon cancer in early 2008, Sharun returned home and joined the Edmonton Wildcats of the Canadian Junior Football League. where he switched to the safety position. The Edmonton Sun reported that he took on a defensive role to increase his likelihood of playing professionally. While with the championship-winning Wildcats in 2009, Sharun was named an All-Canadian. He accumulated 25 tackles, five interceptions (including one returned for a touchdown), and a fumble recovery in his final year with the Wildcats.

== Professional career ==
=== Edmonton Eskimos ===
Sharun was selected by the Edmonton Eskimos in the sixth round of the 2010 CFL draft before that year's season with the 43rd overall pick. The Eskimos signed Sharun to a three-year contract with an option for a fourth year on May 4, 2010.

Sharun participated in training camp with the Eskimos in 2010 and practiced with the first team as a safety, but was moved to the practice squad when the team was reduced to 46 players. The Eskimos went on to transfer Sharun between the active and practice rosters several times throughout the year. He made his CFL debut on July 11, 2010, against the Montreal Alouettes, and later recorded his first special teams tackle on August 6 against the Toronto Argonauts. In a game against the Saskatchewan Roughriders on August 28, Sharun blocked a punt to set up the Eskimos' only touchdown along the way to scoring 17 unanswered points to win 17–14. In his rookie season, Sharun recorded 16 special teams tackles while playing in 15 regular season games, along with one defensive tackle.

Sharun played in all 18 games throughout the regular season of 2011. Cementing his role as a special teams player, Sharun made 25 special teams tackles in the regular season, tying the team's single-season record previously held solely by Bruce Dickinson. His franchise record was later broken by Deon Lacey in 2014. He recorded the second highest total of special teams tackles in the CFL, leading the West division in that category. Playing against the Hamilton Tiger-Cats on July 9, 2011, Sharun recorded a career-high four tackles. He made one special teams tackle during the playoffs. The Eskimos finished the season with a winning record of 11–7 and finished second in the West division. The Edmonton Eskimos lost the West Finals to the BC Lions, eventual Grey Cup champions. Sharun was active in both playoff games.

Sharun played in 13 regular season games and registered 13 special teams tackles during the 2012 season. He was placed on the six-game injured list in October. In a September 7 game against the Stampeders, Sharun caught an unlikely pass from third-string quarterback and holder Matt Nichols following a failed field goal snap and ran 35 yards for both players' first career touchdown.

In the 2013 CFL, Sharun played in 11 games and recorded 14 special teams tackles, including three total tackles in the September 6 game against the Stampeders. He began the season on the practice roster after being cut when the Eskimos reduced their roster to 46 players, but returned to the active roster on July 12.

Sharun achieved nine special teams tackles over 13 games during the 2014 season. He also played in two playoff matches, recording an additional tackle. Sharun was placed on the injured list several times during the 2014 season, including a transfer to the six-game injured list in September. Following the 2014 season, Sharun was signed to a contract extension by the Eskimos but was released prior to the start of the regular season in 2015.

=== Calgary Stampeders ===
The Calgary Stampeders signed Sharun to their practice roster on July 28, 2015, where he remained for most of the season. He was activated for the West Final following an injury to Karl McCartney. In a loss at the West Final, Sharun made three special-teams tackles against his former team, the Eskimos. On June 19, 2016, Sharun was released by the Stampeders.

== Statistics ==
			Tackles			Receiving		
Year	Team	GP	TOTAL	TKL	STT	Catches	Yards	TD
2010	ESK	15	17	1	16	0	0	0
2011	ESK	18	26	1	25	0	0	0
2012	ESK	13	13	0	13	0	0	0
2013	ESK	11	15	1	14	1	35	1
2014	ESK	13	9	0	9	0	0	0
Total		70	80	3	77	1	35	1
