= Marcus Henry (wide receiver) =

American gridiron football player (born 1986)

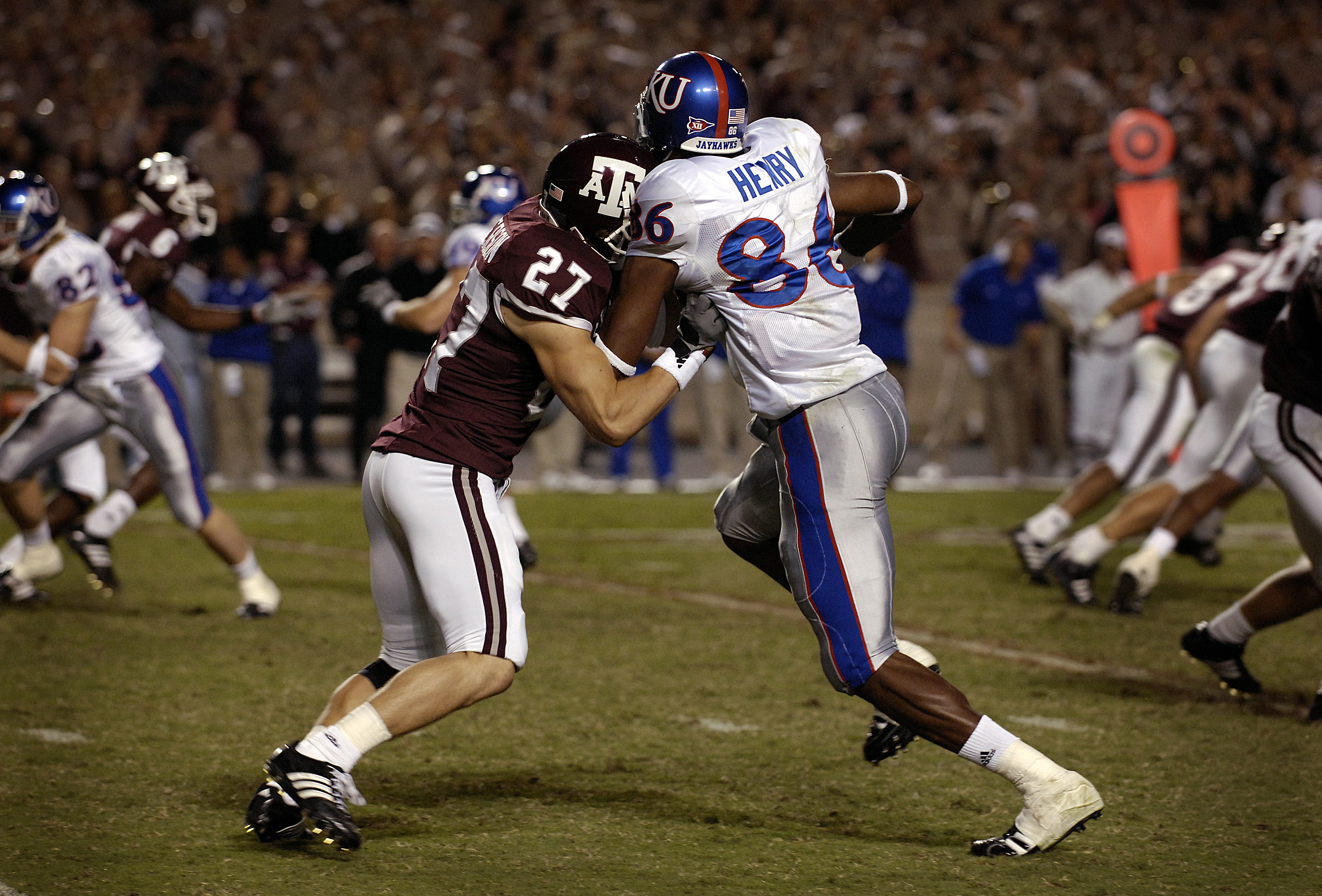
- Henry (#86) makes a reception against Texas A&M in October 2007

No. 83
- Position: Wide receiver

Personal information
- Born: February 21, 1986 (age 40); Hinesville, Georgia, U.S.
- Listed height: 6 ft 5 in (1.96 m)
- Listed weight: 225 lb (102 kg)

Career information
- College: Kansas
- NFL draft: 2008: 6th round, 171st overall pick

Career history
- New York Jets (2008–2009); Carolina Panthers (2010)*; Edmonton Eskimos (2011–2013); Ottawa Redblacks (2014–2015); Montreal Alouettes (2016)
- * Offseason or practice squad member only

Awards and highlights
- Second-team All-Big 12 (2007)
- Stats at Pro Football Reference
- Stats at CFL.ca (archive)

Marcus Henry (born February 21, 1986) is an American former professional football wide receiver. He played college football for the Kansas Jayhawks and was selected by the New York Jets of the National Football League (NFL) in the sixth round of the 2008 NFL draft. He played for the Edmonton Eskimos, Ottawa Redblacks, and Montreal Alouettes of the Canadian Football League (CFL).

== Professional career ==
=== New York Jets ===
The New York Jets drafted Henry in the sixth round (171st overall) of the 2008 NFL draft. Henry was considered a "developing" prospect; however, his height advantage attracted the Jets' attention. The Jets signed Henry to a rookie contract on June 6, 2008. Henry made the active roster; however, he was inactive for the first two games of the season until he was waived by the team on September 22, 2008. Henry was subsequently signed to the team's practice squad on September 24, 2008, where he remained for the remainder of the season.

Following the season, Henry was signed to a reserve/future contract on January 24, 2009. During training camp practices, backup quarterback Erik Ainge praised Henry, who taught his fellow receivers how to use their strengths to their advantage. In spite of the positive praise, Henry was again released from the team on September 5, 2009, during the final roster cuts. Henry was signed to the team's practice squad, two days later, where he remained for the season.

The team signed the wideout to a future/reserve contract in February. The Jets waived Henry on August 29.

=== Carolina Panthers ===
Henry was signed to the Carolina Panthers practice squad on September 23, 2010.

=== Edmonton Eskimos ===
Henry signed a contract with the Edmonton Eskimos of the Canadian Football League on April 5, 2011. He sustained an injury and only played in 11 games in the 2011 CFL season. In his first year in the CFL, he recorded 384 yards and one touchdown. Henry sat out the first half of 2012 with a knee injury sustained in training camp. Playing in the second half of the season, Henry played in nine games for the Eskimos. Henry had a similar season with regards to production, amassing 382 yards and one receiving touchdown. Following the 2012 CFL season, he was not re-signed and became a free agent in February 2013. However, on May 1, 2013, Henry re-signed with the Eskimos. The 2013 season was Henry's third with the Eskimos. Henry appeared in 12 games for the Eskimos in the 2013 season. By the end of the season, he compiled 535 receiving yards on 34 receptions, with one touchdown.

=== Ottawa RedBlacks ===
Henry signed as a free-agent with the expansion Ottawa RedBlacks prior to the 2014 season. Henry went on to lead the RedBlacks receiving corps in receptions and yardage, amassing a career best of 824 yards on 67 receptions. Following the 2014 season, the Redblacks made a series of high-profile signings to bolster their wide receiving corps, leaving Henry's roster status in more doubt than had been anticipated. Henry only appeared in one game during the 2015 season; he missed the majority of the season due to injury. He was not re-signed by the Redblacks following the season, and thus became a free agent on February 9, 2016. Henry attended the Edmonton Eskimos mini-camp in Florida in late April in an attempt to qualify for the team's main training camp.

=== Montreal Alouettes ===
Henry was signed to the Montreal Alouettes' practice roster. He made his first start in the October 22, 2016, game against the Saskatchewan Roughriders, when he scored a touchdown.

==== CFL statistics ====
Year	Team	Receptions	Yards	Average	TD's
2011	Edmonton	33	384	11.6	1
2012	Edmonton	28	382	13.6	1
2013	Edmonton	34	535	15.7	1
2014	Ottawa	67	824	12.3	2
2015	Ottawa	0	0	0	0
2016	Montreal	3	39	13.0	1

== Personal life ==
He has a fraternal twin brother Maurice, who played with him in high school and college.
