= Cathedral High School (Hamilton, Ontario) =

Canadian Catholic secondary school

- Coat of Arms

Location
- 30 Wentworth Street North; Hamilton, Ontario, L8L 8H5; Canada; 43.2536°N 79.8484°W

Information
- School type: Public, separate secondary school
- Motto: Latin: Probitas et Scientia (Goodness and Knowledge)
- Religious affiliation: Catholic
- Established: 1912; 114 years ago; 1992 (present form)
- School board: Hamilton-Wentworth Catholic District School Board
- Superintendent: Brian Daly
- Area trustee: Josie Angelini
- School number: 695343
- Principal: Anthony Macaluso
- Chaplain: Sue O'Keefe
- Grades: 9–12
- Enrolment: 1,600 (2025)
- Campus type: Urban
- Colours: Blue and white
- Mascot: Gael
- Alumni: chs.hwcdsb.ca/school/alumni
- Website: Official website

Cathedral High School is a Catholic secondary school located in Hamilton. It is a part of the Hamilton-Wentworth Catholic District School Board and is affiliated with the nearby cathedral Christ the King.

== Notable alumni ==
- Mike Cornell – Canadian Football League (CFL) player
- Pete Giftopoulos – CFL player
- Nathan Kanya – Canadian Football League
- Bobbi Lancaster – medical doctor and professional golfer
- Brian Melo – winner of Canadian Idol
- Patrick Pugliese – Olympic water polo player
- Pat Quinn – NHL player and coach
- Paul Francis Reding – bishop
- Rocco Romano – CFL player
- Dave Stala – CFL player
- Tomi Swick – musician
- Melissa Tancredi – Olympic soccer player
- Tyrone Watson – basketball player

== Notable faculty ==
- Thomas Christopher Collins – Archbishop of Toronto

== See also ==
- Education in Ontario
- List of secondary schools in Ontario
