= Marcell Young =

American gridiron football player (born 1987)

No. 25
- Position: Defensive back

Personal information
- Born: September 2, 1987 (age 39); Utica, Mississippi, U.S.
- Listed height: 6 ft 0 in (1.83 m)
- Listed weight: 190 lb (86 kg)

Career information
- College: Jackson State

Career history
- 2010: New Orleans Saints*
- 2011–2012: Hamilton Tiger-Cats
- 2013–2017: Edmonton Eskimos
- 2018: BC Lions
- 2018: Saskatchewan Roughriders*
- * Offseason or practice squad member only

Awards and highlights
- Grey Cup champion (2015)
- Stats at CFL.ca

Marcell Young (born September 2, 1987) is a professional Canadian football defensive back. He was previously a member of the BC Lions of the Canadian Football League (CFL). He played college football at Jackson State University. Young has also been a member of the New Orleans Saints (NFL), Hamilton Tiger-Cats (CFL) and Edmonton Eskimos (CFL).

== College career ==
Young played college football at Hinds Community College for two years from 2006 to 2007. In 2008, he transferred to Jackson State University, where he played for the Jackson State Tigers for two years. Young received significant playing time in his first year as a result of a season-ending broken collarbone to starting cornerback Jeremy Pierce. Over two years at Jackson State, Young achieved 48 tackles, five pass deflections, two interceptions, one sack, and one fumble recovery.

== Professional career ==
=== New Orleans Saints ===
In 2010, Young signed with the New Orleans Saints of the National Football League as an undrafted free agent. On July 22, he was waived by the Saints before the start of the regular season.

=== Hamilton Tiger-Cats ===
Young signed with the Hamilton Tiger-Cats of the Canadian Football League in 2011. In his first season with the Tiger-Cats, he started all 18 games and recorded 51 total tackles. His second season was limited to only five games after he broke his hand during Week 2, which resulted in him being placed on the nine-game injured list.

=== Edmonton Eskimos ===
On February 15, 2013, Young signed with the Edmonton Eskimos. He started in 17 games in his first season with the Eskimos and 15 games in his 2014 season, recording 43 tackles in each season. He started in two post-season games in 2014. He was re-signed on December 12, 2014 to a new contract. Over the next two seasons Young would continue to play a significant role in the Eskimos defense; earning another contract extension on February 1, 2017. Young was placed on the six-game injured list early in the season and ultimately only played in seven games in the 2017 season, contributing only 16 tackles. He was released by the Eskimos on March 29, 2018.

=== BC Lions ===
On April 11, 2018, Young signed with the BC Lions. During the Lions' first game of the season, he gained attention for tackling a streaker on the BC Place field. The streaker had been running on the field and delaying the game for an extended time due to nonchalant stadium security before Young intervened.

== Statistics ==
Year	Team	GP	Tackles			Interceptions		Fumbles
Year	Team	GP	Tkl	STT	Sck	Int	TDs	FF
2011	HAM	18	49	2	–	2	–	1
2012	HAM	5	15	–	–	1	–	–
2013	EDM	17	43	4	–	1	–	–
2014	EDM	15	43	–	2	1	–	–
2015	EDM	17	37	–	1	1	–	–
2016	EDM	17	60	–	–	–	–	–
2017	EDM	7	16	–	–	–	–	–
Total		97	262	6	3	6	–	1
