= Beaver Brae Secondary School =

Public school in Canada

Location
- 1400 Ninth Street North; Kenora, Ontario, P9N 2T7; Canada; 49.776°N 94.463°W

Information
- School type: Public high school
- Founded: 1963
- School board: Keewatin-Patricia District School Board
- Superintendent: Shannon Bailey and Shawnda Norlock
- Principal: Christina Fisher
- Grades: 7 - 12
- Enrollment: approx. 550 (September 2022)
- Language: English
- Colours: Purple and white
- Mascot: Purple Pete
- Team name: Beaver Brae Broncos
- Website: bbs.kpdsb.ca#/

Beaver Brae (BBSS) (2022 population 550) is a secondary school situated in Kenora, Ontario, Canada.

Beaver Brae Secondary School offers grades seven through twelve, and has 65 staff members. The school offers trades, college, and university level programs.

== Curriculum ==
The school offers around two hundred subjects. The major subject areas are English, mathematics, science, social sciences, French and physical education. There are options in music, art, drama, automotive technology, communications, business studies, food and nutrition, hospitality and tourism, Ojibwe, Native Studies, computing and law.

== Renovations ==
In 1989 there was a high tech renovation. A library, music room, and art room were added in 1992. In 2000-2001 there was an addition consisting of four classrooms and a gym. Beaver Brae was updated with a student atrium in 2007. The atrium holds paintings which were painted by students, a big screen TV, projectors, pictures and awards. The high school is due to receive $6 million upgrade to the tech wing, parking lot and field, with completion estimated at February 2020.

== Activities ==
The school has a concert band, choir and drama programs.

== Sports ==
Beaver Brae sports teams include volleyball, basketball, soccer, badminton, football, hockey, wrestling, curling, and cheerleading. The teams have won NorWOSSA and NWOSSAA titles, and OFSAA medals.

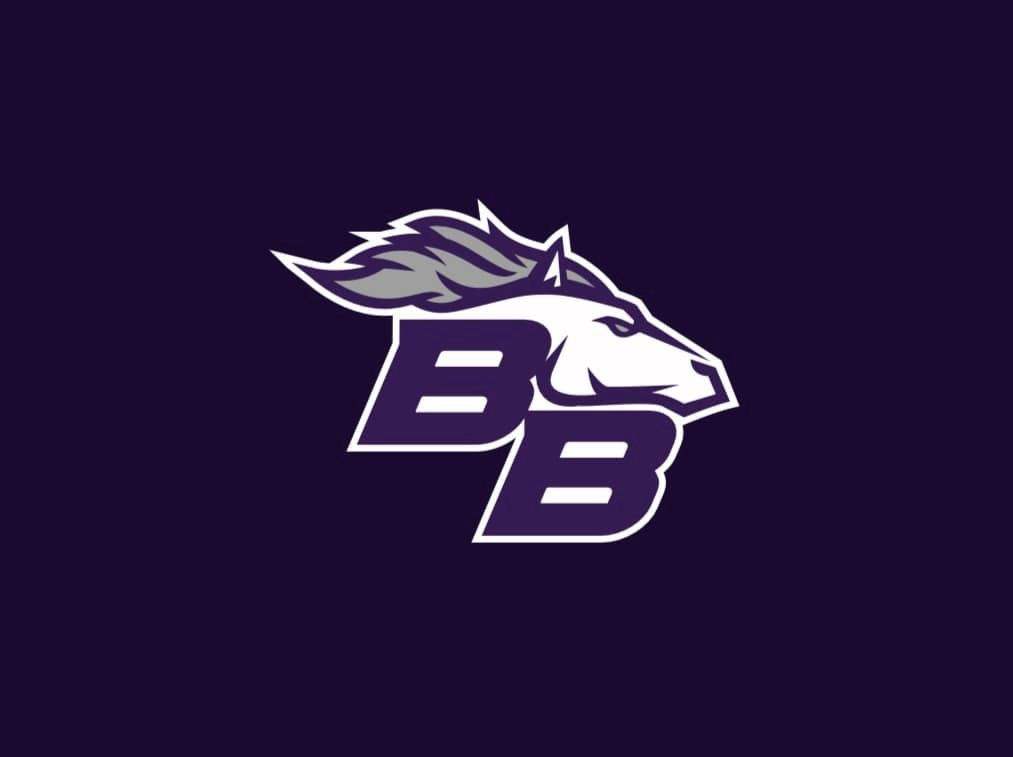
Athletic Logo introduced in October 2022

Athletic logo used from the late 1990s to mid 2000s

The Broncos football team joined the Winnipeg High School Football League (WHSFL) in 2001. In their inaugural season, the team won the league's 'A' title.

The Beaver Brae senior boys volleyball team won OFSAA 'AA' bronze medals in 2007 and 2009.

Beaver Brae hosted the 'AA' OFSAA championships for female volleyball and soccer during the 2008/2009 school year.

Despite not having track and field team since the 1990s, the school still holds NWOSSAA records. Some of the records include the senior boys triple and long jump records and the senior girls 400m and high jump records.

In 2013, the Bronco Cheerleading team won The Cheer Evolution Canadian Nationals in Niagara Falls, claiming the schools first national title.

A List of Beaver Brae's NorWOSSA championships:

Sport	NorWOSSA Championships
Senior boys volleyball (18)	2025, 2024, 2019, 2018, 2017, 2009, 2007, 2006, 2004, 2002, 2000, 1991, 1990, 1989, 1988, 1982, 1980, 1979
Senior girls volleyball (15)	2018, 1999, 1998, 1993, 1992, 1982, 1981, 1980, 1979, 1978, 1977, 1976, 1975, 1974, 1970
Senior boys basketball (16)	2023, 2005, 2003, 1999, 1998, 1997, 1996, 1995, 1992, 1990, 1983, 1982, 1981, 1980, 1979, 1963
Senior girls basketball (9)	2005, 1998, 1996, 1992, 1991, 1990, 1984, 1981, 1980
Boys soccer (7)	2024, 2023, 2008, 2007, 2000, 1995, 1992
Girls soccer (6)	2018, 2013, 2012, 2011, 2010, 2003, 1997
Boys hockey (6)	2024, 2006, 1997, 1982, 1979, 1970
Girls hockey (6)	2012, 2011, 2008, 2004, 2003, 2002
Football (13)	2001 (WHSFL), 2000, 1993, 1992, 1991, 1990, 1985, 1984, 1983, 1982, 1981, 1971, 1970

Medals won at the OFSAA championships:

Year	Sport	Medal
2026	Girls Swimming 100m Free Multi-Class (Individual)	Bronze
2025	Girls Wrestling 115 kg (Individual)	Gold
2024	Girls Wrestling 95 kg (Individual)	Silver
2017	Boys Swimming 100m Freestyle (Individual)	Gold
2009	Boys volleyball	Bronze
2007	Boys volleyball	Bronze
2002	Girls hockey	Bronze
1988	Girls curling	Silver
1973	Boys Wrestling 89 kg (Individual)	Gold

== Notable alumni ==
- Kyle Koch, CFL player
- Eric Melillo, politician
- Mike Richards, NHL player
- Mike Smith, Olympic decathlete
- Rick St. Croix, NHL player
- Dave Van Belleghem, CFL player

== See also ==
- Education in Ontario
- List of secondary schools in Ontario
