= Kavis Reed =

Personal information
- Born: February 24, 1973 (age 53); Georgetown, South Carolina, U.S.
- Listed height: 6 ft 0 in (1.83 m)
- Listed weight: 170 lb (77 kg)

Career information
- College: Furman

Career history

Playing
- 1995–1999: Edmonton Eskimos

Coaching
- 2001: Toronto Argonauts (DBC/STC)
- 2002–2003: Ottawa Renegades (DBC)
- 2004–2006: Hamilton Tiger-Cats (DC)
- 2007: Toronto Argonauts (Defensive assistant)
- 2008: Toronto Argonauts (DC)
- 2009: Saskatchewan Roughriders (RBC)
- 2009: Saskatchewan Roughriders (STC)
- 2010: Winnipeg Blue Bombers (DC)
- 2011–2012: Edmonton Eskimos (HC)
- 2012: Edmonton Eskimos (HC/OC)
- 2013: Edmonton Eskimos (HC)
- 2015–2016: Montreal Alouettes (STC)
- 2017: Montreal Alouettes (Interim HC)

Operations
- 2016–2019: Montreal Alouettes (GM)

Awards and highlights
- CFL All-Star (1997); CFL West All-Star (1997)

Kavis Reed (born February 24, 1973) is a former Canadian Football League (CFL) defensive back, head coach and general manager. He was most recently the GM of the Montreal Alouettes from December 2016 until July 2019. He also served three years as the head coach of the Edmonton Eskimos, leading them to one West Final game. He played professionally as a defensive back for the Eskimos from 1995 to 1999.

== Playing career ==
Reed played for the Edmonton Eskimos from 1995 to 1999. He was named a CFL All-Star in 1997 and played in his first and only Grey Cup which was a loss to the Toronto Argonauts. In the following off-season, he signed with the Kansas City Chiefs in February 1998 but soon after re-joined the Eskimos in August 1998. He suffered a career-ending neck injury in 1999 and retired soon after. He finished his professional playing career with 205 tackles, 20 interceptions, and five touchdowns in 67 games played.

== Coaching career ==
After 10 years as an assistant coach in the CFL, Reed was hired as head coach for the Edmonton Eskimos, being named the 19th head coach in Eskimos history on December 10, 2010 after signing a three-year contract. He was released from a contract extension November 4, 2013 after an unsuccessful season. Reed also served as the interim coach for the Als in 2017 after the firing of Jacques Chapdelaine, finishing the season with seven straight losses.

=== Head coaching record ===
Team	Year	Regular season					Postseason		
Team	Year	Won	Lost	Ties	Win %	Finish	Won	Lost	Result
EDM	2011	11	7	0	.611	2nd in West Division	1	1	Lost West Final
EDM	2012	7	11	0	.388	4th in West Division	0	1	Lost East Semi-Final
EDM	2013	4	14	0	.222	4th in West Division	-	-	Failed to Qualify
MTL	2017	0	7	0	.000	4th in East Division	-	-	Failed to Qualify
Total		22	39	0	.361	0 Division; Championships	1	2	0 Grey Cups

== General manager career ==
Reed was announced as the general manager of the Montreal Alouettes on December 14, 2016, after the 2016 CFL season. Reed briefly expanded his role as GM to include the role of head coach after the firing of Jacques Chapdelaine in 2017. On July 14, 2019, after a 2–2 start to the 2019 season, Montreal Alouettes president and CEO Patrick Boivin relieved Reed of his duties as general manager. The reason for the firing was not made known in the midst of the impending sale of the club to new ownership.

=== General managing record ===
Team	Year	Regular season					Postseason		
Team	Year	Won	Lost	Ties	Win %	Finish	Won	Lost	Result
MTL	2017	3	15	0	.167	4th in East Division	-	-	Failed to qualify
MTL	2018	5	13	0	.278	3rd in East Division	-	-	Failed to qualify
MTL	2019	2	2	0	.500	2nd in East Division	-	-	Fired Mid-Season
Total		10	30	0	.250	0 Division; Championships	-	-	0 Grey Cups
