= Kyle Norris =

Canadian football player (born 1990)

No. 48
- Position: Linebacker

Personal information
- Born: March 12, 1990 (age 36); Stittsville, Ontario, Canada
- Listed height: 6 ft 2 in (1.88 m)
- Listed weight: 230 lb (104 kg)

Career information
- High school: Ottawa (ON) South Carleton
- University: Saint Mary's
- CFL draft: 2013: 3rd round, 24th overall pick

Career history
- 2013: Edmonton Eskimos
- 2014: Winnipeg Blue Bombers
- 2014: Montreal Alouettes
- 2015: Saskatchewan Roughriders
- Stats at CFL.ca

Kyle Norris (born March 12, 1990) is a Canadian former professional football linebacker. He was drafted 24th overall by the Edmonton Eskimos in the 2013 CFL draft. Norris played U Sports football with the Saint Mary's Huskies.

== College career ==
Norris played for the Saint Mary's Huskies from 2009 to 2012, appearing in 32 games. Norris attended the U Sports East-West Bowl in 2012 and was invited to the CFL Combine in 2013. He recorded a career total of 101 tackles, 13 tackles for loss, 5 sacks, and 2 interceptions.

== Professional career ==
=== Edmonton Eskimos ===
Norris was drafted 24th overall (3rd round) by the Edmonton Eskimos in the 2013 CFL draft. He appeared in eight regular season games recording 5 special teams tackles and a forced fumble. He was released by the Eskimos on June 22, 2014.

=== Winnipeg Blue Bombers ===
Norris was signed by the Winnipeg Blue Bombers on June 23, 2014. He appeared in ten regular season games and recorded 2 special teams tackles.

=== Montreal Alouettes ===
Norris was claimed off the Winnipeg Blue Bombers practice roster by the Alouettes on November 5, 2014. He appeared in one regular season game and two playoff games recording 2 special teams tackles. He was released by the Alouettes on June 4, 2015.

=== Saskatchewan Roughriders ===
Norris was signed to the Saskatchewan Roughriders roster on October 29, 2015. He appeared in one regular season game recording 1 special teams tackle. He was released by the Roughriders on December 15, 2015.
