= Nathan Kanya =

Canadian football player (born 1984)

No. 42
- Position: Linebacker

Personal information
- Born: October 17, 1984 (age 42)
- Listed height: 6 ft 2 in (1.88 m)
- Listed weight: 220 lb (100 kg)

Career information
- High school: Cathedral
- University: British Columbia
- CFL draft: 2009: undrafted

Career history
- 2011–2012: Hamilton Tiger-Cats
- 2013–2014: Edmonton Eskimos
- 2015: Saskatchewan Roughriders
- Stats at CFL.ca

Nathan Kanya (born October 17, 1984) is a Canadian former professional football linebacker. After finishing his CIS career with the UBC Thunderbirds in Vancouver BC, he signed as an undrafted free agent with the Hamilton Tiger-Cats on March 2, 2011.

Nathan was acquired by the Edmonton Eskimos via a trade deal with the Hamilton Ticats on February 5, 2013

Following the 2015 CFL season, Kanya was re-signed by the Saskatchewan Roughriders for the 2016 season. Terms of the contract were not disclosed. Nathan retired in June 2016.
