= Brody McKnight =

Canadian gridiron football player (born 1989)

Profile
- Positions: Kicker, Punter

Personal information
- Born: October 20, 1989 (age 37); Vancouver, British Columbia
- Died: 8/2/23; Vancouver BC
- Listed height: 6 ft 0 in (1.83 m)
- Listed weight: 215 lb (98 kg)

Career information
- University: Montana
- CFL draft: 2011: 1st round, 8th overall pick

Career history
- 2012: Montreal Alouettes*
- 2012: Edmonton Eskimos
- 2013: Saskatchewan Roughriders*
- 2013: Hamilton Tiger-Cats
- 2013: Winnipeg Blue Bombers
- * Offseason or practice squad member only
- Stats at CFL.ca

Brody McKnight (born October 20, 1989) is a Canadian former professional football placekicker who played for two seasons in the Canadian Football League (CFL).

== College career ==
McKnight played college football for the Montana Grizzlies where there as team captain he shared the team's most valuable player award in 2010 with Chase Reynolds and in 2011 with Caleb McSurdy.

== Professional career ==
McKnight was drafted eighth overall by the Montreal Alouettes in the 2011 CFL draft and signed with them on July 8, 2012 after completing his college eligibility. He was later traded to the Eskimos in exchange for a placekicker, a first and a fourth round pick in the 2013 CFL draft on September 12, 2012.

In the following off-season, he was again traded on March 1, 2013, this time to the Saskatchewan Roughriders along with a sixth round draft pick for two fifth round picks in the 2013 draft. Following his play in two pre-season games where he made two of three field goal attempts and punted six times for an average of 44.7 yards, McKnight was part of the team's final cuts on June 22, 2013. He was later signed by the Hamilton Tiger-Cats on July 3, 2013. On August 27, 2013, McKnight was signed by the Winnipeg Blue Bombers.
