= Brandon Lang =

American gridiron football player (born 1986)

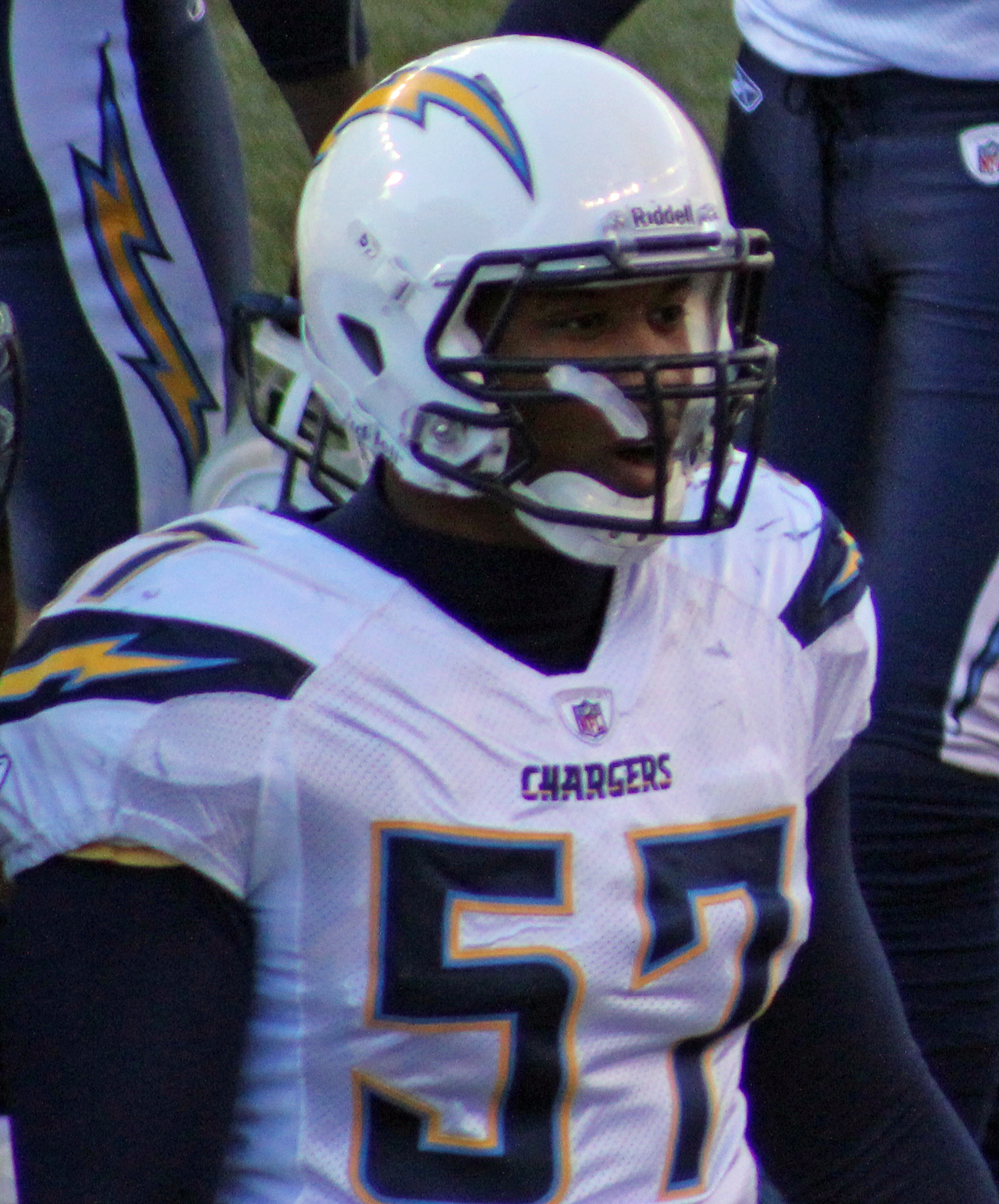
- Lang in 2010.

No. 91
- Position: Defensive end

Personal information
- Born: June 18, 1986 (age 40); Atlanta, Georgia
- Listed height: 6 ft 3 in (1.91 m)
- Listed weight: 266 lb (121 kg)

Career information
- High school: Tucker (Tucker, Georgia)
- College: Troy
- NFL draft: 2010: undrafted

Career history
- San Diego Chargers (2010); Orlando Predators (2012); Edmonton Eskimos (2012–2013); Ottawa Redblacks (2014)

Awards and highlights
- 2× First-team All-Sun Belt (2008, 2009)

Career NFL statistics
- Tackles: 1
- Sacks: 1
- Interceptions: 0
- Forced fumbles: 0
- Stats at Pro Football Reference
- Stats at CFL.ca (archive)

Brandon Montez Lang (born June 18, 1986 in Tucker, Georgia) is a gridiron football defensive end. He attended Troy University, where he graduated from in 2010. After going undrafted in the 2010 NFL draft, he signed as an undrafted free agent with the San Diego Chargers., and then was signed by the Edmonton Eskimos on September 25, 2012.

He was also a member of the Orlando Predators.

== High school career ==
Lang attended Tucker High School in Georgia, where he helped his team to a 34-4 record over three seasons while playing both tight end and defensive end. Lang was twice named both first-team All-State (AJC) and All-Region. As a defensive player, he recorded 290 career tackles including 71 sacks. He was also credited with 18 career fumble recoveries and 122 tackles for loss.

He initially committed to play football at Georgia, but instead attended Hargrave Military Academy. Considered a four-star recruit by Rivals.com, Lang was ranked 10th among prep school prospects in 2005. It has been reported by NFL blogger Gil Brant that Lang signed with the San Diego Chargers as an undrafted free agent shortly after the draft.

== College career ==
In 2006, he committed to Troy and became part of the defensive line rotation as a freshman. In 2007, Lang started three games before a knee injury ended his season. In 2008, Lang was rated as the Sun Belt Conference's top NFL draft prospect by Sporting News.

During the 2008 season, Lang earned 9 sacks and 56 tackles over the 13 game season. Following the year, he was named to the top 100 returning players in college football, ranking at number 84.

== Professional career ==
=== San Diego Chargers ===
Shortly after going undrafted in 2010, Lang signed with the San Diego Chargers as a free agent. He was released by the Chargers on November 22, 2010, but later re-signed. He was released again on July 28, 2011.

=== Orlando Predators ===
Lang was signed by the Arena Football League team, the Orlando Predators on December 6, 2011.

=== Edmonton Eskimos ===
Lang was signed by the Edmonton Eskimos on September 25, 2012.

=== Ottawa Redblacks ===
Lang was signed by the Ottawa Redblacks on February 13, 2014. Lang was released by the Ottawa Redblacks on October 14, 2014.
