= Gordon Hinse =

Canadian football player (born 1987)

Profile
- Position: Center

Personal information
- Born: August 24, 1987 (age 39); Edmonton, Alberta
- Listed height: 6 ft 4 in (1.93 m)
- Listed weight: 305 lb (138 kg)

Career information
- High school: Austin O'Brien
- CJFL: Edmonton Wildcats
- University: Alberta
- CFL draft: 2009: 2nd round, 11th overall pick

Career history
- 2009–2013: Edmonton Eskimos
- 2014: Winnipeg Blue Bombers
- 2015: Saskatchewan Roughriders
- Stats at CFL.ca

Gordon "Gord" Hinse (born August 24, 1987) is a professional Canadian football offensive lineman. He last played for the Saskatchewan Roughriders of the Canadian Football League. He was drafted by the Edmonton Eskimos in the second round of the 2009 CFL draft and signed a four-year deal with an option in 2013. He played CIS football for the Alberta Golden Bears - the University of Alberta team where he was named a Canada West all-star and Academic All-Canadian.

== Professional career ==
=== 2009 Season ===
After eight backup selections, he was placed on the practice roster, ending up on the nine-game injured list before the end of the season.

=== 2010 Season ===
He was in the Eskimos' squad 18 times during the season, playing in a number of short yardage plays. During this season he has returned to the Alberta Golden Bears to help with the coaching.

=== 2011 Season ===
Gord Hinse began the 2011 season on the 9-game injured list with an injury to the thumb. He saw action when starting centres Aaron Fiacconi and Kyle Koch went out with injuries. Hinse was activated for the October 10, 2011 game against the Saskatchewan Roughriders and played centre midway through the game after Kyle Koch was injured. He played centre for the last 5 games (4 starts) of the 2011 season. Hinse also started the Western Semi-Final and the Western Final.

During an October 29, 2011 game against the BC Lions, Hinse became well known for his continued play in blocking for Ricky Ray despite having lost his helmet at the beginning of the play.

== Personal Achievements ==
On June 11, 2012, Hinse graduated with a Bachelor of Arts degree from the University of Alberta Faculty of Native Studies.
