= Dobson Collins =

American gridiron football player (born 1987)

No. 14, 87
- Position: Wide receiver

Personal information
- Born: July 12, 1987 (age 39); Stone Mountain, Georgia, U.S.
- Listed height: 6 ft 2 in (1.88 m)
- Listed weight: 185 lb (84 kg)

Career information
- High school: Stone Mountain
- College: Gardner–Webb
- NFL draft: 2009: undrafted

Career history
- San Francisco 49ers (2009)*; Philadelphia Eagles (2009–2010)*; BC Lions (2011); Edmonton Eskimos (2011–2012); Hamilton Tiger-Cats (2013); Ottawa Redblacks (2014); Montreal Alouettes (2015); Baltimore Ravens (2016)*
- * Offseason or practice squad member only

Awards and highlights
- 2× All-Big South honors (2007, 2008); Atlantic Sun Conference champion in 60 meter hurdles (2006); Track and field Freshman of the Year (2006)
- Stats at CFL.ca (archive)

Dobson Collins (born July 12, 1987) is an American former professional football wide receiver. He was originally signed by the San Francisco 49ers as an undrafted free agent in 2009. He played college football at Gardner–Webb.

Collins was also a member of the Philadelphia Eagles, BC Lions, Edmonton Eskimos, Hamilton Tiger-Cats, Ottawa Redblacks, Montreal Alouettes, and Baltimore Ravens.

== Early life ==
Collins was born in Miami, Florida and later moved to Stone Mountain, Georgia, where he attended Stone Mountain High School. He played high school football there and, in his senior year, recorded 21 receptions for 332 yards and two touchdowns.

== College career ==
Collins played college football and participated in track and field at Gardner–Webb University. During his football career, he played in 42 games with 22 starts, caught 143 passes for 1,754 yards and 14 touchdowns as a wide receiver. He was a two-time All-Big South selection as a punt returner and wide receiver. In his freshman season, he caught eight passes for 55 yards. As a sophomore, he made eight receptions for 104 yards. In his junior year, he caught 51 passes for 649 yards and three touchdowns. As a senior, he made 76 receptions for 937 yards and 10 touchdowns. He was ranked as one of the top punt returners in the conference with a 9.7 yards per punt return average. In track and field, he holds the school record in the 55, 60 and 110 meter hurdles. He was named the 2006 Atlantic Sun Conference champion in the 60 meter hurdles and was named the Freshman of the Year after his team won the outdoor track title that year.

== Professional career ==
=== San Francisco 49ers ===
Collins was signed by the San Francisco 49ers as an undrafted free agent following the 2009 NFL draft. He was waived on September 5, 2009 during final roster cuts. He subsequently re-signed to the team's practice squad on September 6. He was released from the practice squad on October 5.

=== Philadelphia Eagles ===
Collins was signed to the Philadelphia Eagles practice squad on October 22, 2009. He was re-signed to a three-year contract on January 11, 2010. He was waived on September 3.

=== BC Lions ===
Collins signed with the BC Lions on April 27, 2011. He was later released on August 8, 2011.

=== Edmonton Eskimos ===
On August 15, 2011, Collins was signed by the Edmonton Eskimos after their receiving corps had been depleted by injuries. He was released on June 23, 2012.

=== Hamilton Tiger-Cats ===
On July 29, 2013, Collins signed with the Hamilton Tiger-Cats.

=== Ottawa Redblacks ===
On January 31, 2014, Collins signed with the expansion Ottawa Redblacks. He scored the first ever touchdown at TD Place Stadium in Redblacks history after he recovered an onside punt.

=== Montreal Alouettes ===
On February 20, 2015, Collins signed a one-year contract with the Montreal Alouettes. He played in one game against the Calgary Stampeders where he had three catches for 51 yards, but he had a costly fumble at the Calgary 2-yard line that ended an Alouette drive. He was subsequently released on August 10, 2015.

=== Baltimore Ravens ===
On October 25, 2016, Collins was signed to the Ravens' practice squad. He was released from the Ravens' practice squad on November 7, 2016.

== Personal life ==
Collins majored in biology at Gardner–Webb University.
