= Rod Williams (defensive back) =

American gridiron football player (born 1987)

No. 37
- Position: Defensive back

Personal information
- Born: May 27, 1987 (age 39); Monroe, Louisiana, U.S.
- Listed height: 5 ft 11 in (1.80 m)
- Listed weight: 180 lb (82 kg)

Career information
- High school: Richwood (LA)
- College: Alcorn State

Career history
- 2010−2012: Edmonton Eskimos
- 2013: Minnesota Vikings*
- 2013–2014: Saskatchewan Roughriders
- 2015: Montreal Alouettes*
- * Offseason or practice squad member only

Awards and highlights
- Grey Cup champion (2013)
- Stats at CFL.ca

Roderick Williams (born May 27, 1987) is an American former professional football defensive back who played in the Canadian Football League (CFL). He won a Grey Cup championship as a member of the Saskatchewan Roughriders. He played college football for the Alcorn State Braves.

== College career ==
Williams played four seasons at cornerback at Alcorn State and had his best year as a junior, recording 66 tackles, 12 pass breakups and one interception.

== Professional career ==
He signed with the Edmonton Eskimos of the Canadian Football League in June 2010 and was named to the opening day practice roster on June 25, 2010. He played in 12 games, making six starts, before ending the season back on the practice roster. He made 15 starts at cornerback in 2011 and was named a West Division All-Star after recording 44 tackles and six interceptions. Williams started 17 games at cornerback in 2012, sitting out the final regular season game, while also starting in the East Semi-Final.

Williams signed with the Vikings in February 2013, but was released by the club on August 26, 2013 (along with 12 others) to get to a 75-man roster. He then signed with the Saskatchewan Roughriders in September of that year and played with that team for two years.

Upon entering free agency, Williams signed with the Montreal Alouettes on February 20, 2015.

Williams retired in April 2015.
