= Pascal Fils =

Canadian football player (born 1984)

Profile
- Position: Running back

Personal information
- Born: July 29, 1984 (age 42); Montreal, Quebec, Canada
- Listed height: 5 ft 10 in (1.78 m)
- Listed weight: 218 lb (99 kg)

Career information
- University: Sherbrooke
- CFL draft: 2010: undrafted

Career history
- 2010–2012: Edmonton Eskimos
- Stats at CFL.ca (archive)

Pascal Fils (born July 29, 1984) is a Canadian former professional football running back who played for the Edmonton Eskimos of the Canadian Football League. He signed as an undrafted free agent with the Eskimos in May 2010 following the 2010 CFL draft. He played college football for the Sherbrooke Vert et Or where he was a four-year starter at running back. He is francophone.
