= Youssy Pierre =

Canadian football player (born 1985)

Profile
- Position: Wide receiver

Personal information
- Born: August 8, 1985 (age 41); Montreal, Quebec, Canada
- Listed height: 6 ft 0 in (1.83 m)
- Listed weight: 185 lb (84 kg)

Career information
- CJFL: St. Leonard Cougars
- University: Montreal
- CFL draft: 2011: 6th round, 46th overall pick

Career history
- 2011−2013: Edmonton Eskimos
- Stats at CFL.ca (archive)

Youssy Pierre (born August 8, 1985 in Montreal, Quebec) is a Canadian former professional football wide receiver who played for the Edmonton Eskimos of the Canadian Football League. He was drafted 46th overall in the 2011 CFL draft by the Eskimos and signed with the team on May 31, 2011. He was released by the Eskimos during training camp on June 17, 2012 and was later brought back to the practice roster. He played CIS football with the Montreal Carabins.
