= Shamawd Chambers =

Canadian football player (born 1989)

Profile
- Position: Wide receiver

Personal information
- Born: March 10, 1989 (age 37); Toronto, Ontario, Canada
- Listed height: 6 ft 3 in (1.91 m)
- Listed weight: 220 lb (100 kg)

Career information
- High school: Markham
- University: Wilfrid Laurier
- CFL draft: 2012: 1st round, 6th overall pick

Career history
- 2012–2015: Edmonton Eskimos
- 2016: Saskatchewan Roughriders
- 2017: Edmonton Eskimos
- 2017–2019: Hamilton Tiger-Cats

Awards and highlights
- Grey Cup champion (2015)
- Stats at CFL.ca

Shamawd Chambers
Medal record

Men's American football

Representing Canada

World Championship
Silver medal – second place	2011 Austria	Team competition

Shamawd Chambers (born March 10, 1989) is a Canadian former professional football wide receiver who played in the Canadian Football League (CFL). After the 2011 CIS season, he was ranked as the third best player in the Canadian Football League's Amateur Scouting Bureau final rankings for players eligible in the 2012 CFL draft and second by players in Canadian Interuniversity Sport. At the 2012 CFL Evaluation Camp, Chambers ran the fastest 40-yard dash, clocking in at 4.42. He was selected sixth overall by the Edmonton Eskimos in the 2012 CFL draft.

== Professional career ==
=== Philadelphia Eagles ===
After going undrafted in the 2012 NFL draft, Chambers received an invitation to the Philadelphia Eagles free-agent tryouts. The tryout took place over the May 12, 2012 weekend and lasted for 3 days. Chambers did not receive an invitation to the Eagles mini-camp.

=== Edmonton Eskimos ===
Shamawd Chambers was selected 6th overall in the 2012 CFL draft by the Edmonton Eskimos of Canadian Football League. He signed on June 3, 2012. Chambers finished the 2012 CFL season with 390 yards and 2 touchdowns. Despite the low season totals, Chambers had at least one reception in 14 of the 16 games that he dressed in. His efforts also earned him the Esks' Most Outstanding Rookie award. After a slow start to the 2013 CFL season Chambers finished with numbers that improved over his rookie season, winning Esks' Most Outstanding Canadian. He amassed 465 receiving yards on 42 catches, 4 of which were touchdowns. Chambers played in the first 10 games of the 2014 CFL season before injuring his knee, which would cause him to miss the remainder of the season. He finished the season with 30 receptions for 366 yards and a single touchdown reception. In 2015, he won the Dick Suderman Trophy for the Grey Cup's Most Valuable Canadian in a 26–20 Eskimos win.

=== Saskatchewan Roughriders ===
Chambers signed as a free agent with Saskatchewan on February 9, 2016. Chambers played in 14 games for the Riders in 2016, catching 25 passes for 269 yards with 1 touchdown. On January 27, 2017, about two weeks before becoming a free agent, Chambers was released by the Riders along with three of his teammates.

=== Edmonton Eskimos (II) ===
On February 9, 2017, Chambers signed with the Edmonton Eskimos (CFL), returning to the team where he spent the first four seasons of his career.

=== Hamilton Tiger-Cats ===
On September 17, 2017, Chambers was traded to the Hamilton Tiger-Cats for two late-round draft picks. Chambers played in seven games for the Ti-Cats in 2017, catching 28 passes for 279 yards. On June 1, 2018, it was announced that Chambers would miss the entire 2018 season with a torn ACL. Approximately one year later, on June 4, 2019, he was cut by the team after the teams first preseason game.
