= Don Oramasionwu =

Canadian football player (born 1986)

No. 91
- Position: Defensive tackle

Personal information
- Born: June 4, 1986 (age 40); Winnipeg, Manitoba, Canada
- Listed height: 6 ft 2 in (1.88 m)
- Listed weight: 290 lb (132 kg)

Career information
- University: Manitoba
- CFL draft: 2008: 5th round, 39th overall pick

Career history
- 2009–2011: Winnipeg Blue Bombers
- 2012–2016: Edmonton Eskimos
- 2017: Montreal Alouettes
- 2018: Ottawa Redblacks

Awards and highlights
- Grey Cup champion (2015)
- Stats at CFL.ca

Donald Oramasionwu (/oʊˌrɑːməsiˈoʊn/; born June 4, 1986) is a Canadian former professional football defensive lineman. Oramasionwu was drafted in the fifth round (39th overall) of the 2008 CFL draft by the Winnipeg Blue Bombers. He attended training camp with the team but returned to the University of Manitoba for his senior year, becoming a Canada West all-star.

On February 20, 2009, Oramasionwu signed with the Blue Bombers and played for three seasons with the team. He was signed as a free agent on February 15, 2012 by the Edmonton Eskimos. He signed with the Montreal Alouettes in February 2017. He was signed by the Ottawa Redblacks on October 9, 2018.
