= Delroy Clarke =

Canadian football player (born 1982)

No. 18
- Position: Cornerback

Personal information
- Born: December 29, 1982 (age 43); Kingston, Jamaica
- Listed height: 6 ft 0 in (1.83 m)
- Listed weight: 190 lb (86 kg)

Career information
- High school: West Hill
- University: Ottawa
- CFL draft: 2008: 4th round, 29th overall pick

Career history
- 2008–2010: Toronto Argonauts
- 2011–2012: Edmonton Eskimos
- 2014: Ottawa Redblacks*
- * Offseason or practice squad member only
- Stats at CFL.ca (archive)

Delroy Clarke (born December 29, 1982) is a former Canadian football cornerback. He was drafted in the fourth round of the 2008 CFL draft by the Toronto Argonauts. He played CIS Football for the Ottawa Gee-Gees.

== Early life ==
Clarke was born in Kingston, Jamaica, moved to Scarborough in the city of Toronto, Ontario, as a teenager, and attended West Hill Collegiate Institute for grades 10, 11, and 12. He was an all-around athlete in school, playing varsity soccer, rugby, and track and field for West Hill. He first played football in the twelfth grade, after a serious leg injury cost him a soccer United States college athletics scholarship. Upset and not wanting to play soccer anymore, friends convinced him to try football. In his only year of high school football, he made enough of an impact to earn United States NCAA Division II scholarship offers but opted to stay in Canada and play for the University of Ottawa.

== Professional career ==
Clarke was drafted in the fourth round of the 2008 CFL draft by the Toronto Argonauts. He played for three seasons in Toronto before he was traded to the Edmonton Eskimos for a fourth round draft pick in the 2012 CFL draft. Following two seasons with the Eskimos, he was released and sat out of football in 2013. He was later signed by the expansion Ottawa Redblacks on January 13, 2014. He was released by the Redblacks on June 4, 2014.

== After football ==
Clarke joined the Royal Canadian Mounted Police after his release from the RedBlacks. He spent the last several years stationed in Shelburne, Nova Scotia.
