= Hugo Lopez (Canadian football) =

Nicaraguan gridiron football player (born 1987)

Profile
- Position: Defensive back

Personal information
- Born: June 16, 1987 (age 39); León, Nicaragua
- Listed height: 6 ft 3 in (1.91 m)
- Listed weight: 210 lb (95 kg)

Career information
- University: Waterloo (2007–2009); Toronto (2010)
- CFL draft: 2011: 2nd round, 14th overall pick

Career history
- 2011–2012: Edmonton Eskimos
- 2013: Toronto Argonauts
- 2014: Saskatchewan Roughriders*
- 2014–2015: Ottawa Redblacks
- 2015: Saskatchewan Roughriders
- 2016: Montreal Alouettes
- * Offseason or practice squad member only
- Stats at CFL.ca

Hugo Lopez (born June 16, 1987) is a Nicaraguan former professional Canadian football defensive back who played in the Canadian Football League (CFL).

== Early life and university ==
Lopez was born in Leon, Nicaragua but left the country at a young age due to political instability. He later lived in both Costa Rica and Naples, Florida in his youth. He discovered American football while attending high school in Naples.

Lopez later moved to North York, Canada. He played CIS football for the Waterloo Warriors from 2007 to 2009, and for the Toronto Varsity Blues in 2010.

== Professional football ==
=== Edmonton Eskimos ===
Lopez was drafted 14th overall in the 2011 CFL draft by the Edmonton Eskimos and signed with the team on May 25, 2011. In his rookie season, he played in three games, recording two special teams tackles.

In 2012, Lopez played in seven games, recording six special teams tackles.

=== Toronto Argonauts ===
On July 23, 2013, Lopez signed with the Toronto Argonauts of the Canadian Football League. He was released by the Argonauts on November 7, 2013.

=== Saskatchewan Roughriders (first stint) ===
On March 18, 2014, Lopez signed with the Saskatchewan Roughriders. He was released by the Roughriders on June 16, 2014.

=== Ottawa Redblacks ===
Lopez was signed by the Ottawa Redblacks on August 19, 2014. He played in 17 games over two seasons with the Redblacks, accumulating five special teams tackles. He was released on September 16, 2015.

=== Saskatchewan Roughriders (second stint) ===
On November 4, 2015, Lopez re-signed with the Roughriders. He played in the team's last game of the regular season and was released by the Roughriders on December 15, 2015.

=== Montreal Alouettes ===
On August 23, 2016, Lopez signed with the Montreal Alouettes. He dressed in two games before being released on September 6, 2016.
