= Justin Capicciotti =

Canadian gridiron football player (born 1989)

No. 94, 98
- Position: Defensive end

Personal information
- Born: November 14, 1989 (age 36); Toronto, Ontario, Canada
- Listed height: 6 ft 3 in (1.91 m)
- Listed weight: 235 lb (107 kg)

Career information
- High school: Central Technical School
- University: Simon Fraser
- CFL draft: 2012: 2nd round, 14th overall pick
- Expansion draft: 2013: 3rd round

Career history
- 2012–2013: Edmonton Eskimos
- 2014–2015: Ottawa Redblacks
- 2016: Saskatchewan Roughriders
- 2016–2018: Hamilton Tiger-Cats

Awards and highlights
- CFL East All-Star (2015)
- Stats at CFL.ca

Justin Capicciotti (born November 14, 1989) is a Canadian former professional football defensive lineman who played in the Canadian Football League (CFL). He played college football for the Simon Fraser Clan and was ranked as the 13th best player in the Canadian Football League’s Amateur Scouting Bureau final rankings for players eligible in the 2012 CFL draft. He was selected 14th overall in the 2012 Draft by the Edmonton Eskimos.

== Professional career ==
=== Edmonton Eskimos ===
He was selected in the second round with the 14th pick in the 2012 CFL draft by the Edmonton Eskimos signed with them on June 3, 2012. He dressed in 22 games over two years with the Eskimos, starting at defensive end in five of them. His first career start came on September 22, 2013.

=== Ottawa Redblacks ===
On December 16, 2013, Capicciotti was drafted by the Ottawa Redblacks in the 2013 CFL Expansion Draft. To start the 2014 season, he dressed as a backup and rotational defensive end. He first started in week five and started every other game that season, finishing with 50 tackles and 11 sacks. The following season, he earned his first east all-star award after registering 47 tackles, 12 sacks, and a forced fumble. He dressed in 17 games and started in 16, while sitting out week 3 dressing as a backup in week 4. He also played and started in the 103rd Grey Cup game.

=== Saskatchewan Roughriders ===
Capicciotti signed with the Roughriders on February 10, 2016, upon becoming a free agent. He played in 14 games for the Roughriders in 2016, registering 24 defensive tackles and two sacks.

=== Hamilton Tiger-Cats ===
On October 10, 2016, Thanksgiving Monday, Capicciotti was traded to the Hamilton Tiger-Cats, along with Xavier Fulton, for Linden Gaydosh, Tommy Streeter, and two 2017 CFL draft picks. Capicciotti played three seasons for the Tiger-Cats, appearing in 39 games and contributing with 65 defensive tackles, 10 sacks, six special teams tackles, and three forced fumbles. He was released by the Ti-Cats on May 6, 2019, prior to training camp for the 2019 season.
