= Alex Anthony (Canadian football) =

Canadian football player (born 1991)

No. 82
- Position: Wide receiver

Personal information
- Born: April 9, 1991 (age 35); Victoria, British Columbia
- Listed height: 6 ft 2 in (1.88 m)
- Listed weight: 205 lb (93 kg)

Career information
- University: Wilfrid Laurier
- CFL draft: 2013: 5th round, 39th overall pick

Career history
- 2013–2014: Saskatchewan Roughriders

Awards and highlights
- 101st Grey Cup champion
- Stats at CFL.ca (archive)

Alex Anthony (born April 9, 1991) is a Canadian former professional football wide receiver who played for the Saskatchewan Roughriders of the Canadian Football League (CFL). Anthony was selected by the Roughriders in the fifth round of the 2013 CFL draft after playing CIS Football with the Wilfrid Laurier Golden Hawks.

== College career ==
Anthony played football for the Wilfrid Laurier Golden Hawks. He finished his career with 47 receptions for 722 yards and seven touchdowns.

== Professional career ==
Anthony was drafted by the Saskatchewan Roughriders with the 39th pick in the 2013 CFL Draft. In 2013, Anthony won the 101st Grey Cup with the Roughriders. Anthony spent much of the 2014 season on the practice roster before being released in June 2015.
