= Elie Ngoyi =

Canadian football player (born 1988)

No. 55, 97
- Position: Defensive end

Personal information
- Born: September 25, 1988 (age 38); Congo
- Listed height: 6 ft 2 in (1.88 m)
- Listed weight: 262 lb (119 kg)

Career information
- University: Bishop's
- CFL draft: 2013: 6th round, 51st overall pick

Career history
- 2013–2016: Edmonton Eskimos
- 2017: Montreal Alouettes

Awards and highlights
- Grey Cup champion (2015)
- Stats at CFL.ca

Elie Ngoyi (born September 25, 1988) is a Congolese-Canadian former professional football defensive end who played in the Canadian Football League (CFL) for the Edmonton Eskimos and Montreal Alouettes. He was selected by the Eskimos in the sixth round of the 2013 CFL draft after playing CIS football at Bishop's University.

== Early life ==
Ngoyi was born in the Congo, and moved to Canada at age ten. He first played football in grade 9. He grew up in Sherbrooke, Quebec. Ngoyi played CIS football for the Bishop's Gaiters of Bishop's University. He totaled 38.5 tackles and 4.5 sacks for the Gaiters in 2012. He graduated from Bishop's with a Bachelor of Arts in sociology, criminology and social policy.

== Professional career ==
Ngoyi's 40 bench press reps were the most at the 2013 CFL Combine.

The Edmonton Eskimos selected Ngoyi in the sixth round, with the 51st overall pick, of the 2013 CFL draft. He dressed in 16 games for the Eskimos during his rookie year in 2013, recording one defensive tackle and eight special teams tackles. He dressed in eight games the following year in 2014, posting only one special teams tackle. In 2015, Ngoyi dressed in 11 games and made three special teams tackles. On November 29, 2015, the Eskimos beat the Ottawa Redblacks in the 103rd Grey Cup by a score of 26–20. He dressed in 16 games during his final season with the Eskimos in 2016, totaling two defensive tackles, seven special teams tackles, and his only career sack. He was released by the Eskimos after training camp on June 17, 2017. Ngoyi wore jersey number 55 during his time with the Eskimos.

Ngoyi dressed in two games for the Montreal Alouettes during the 2017 season but did not record any statistics. He wore number 97 with the Alouettes.

== Personal life ==
Ngoyi spent time working as a correctional officer at the Edmonton Remand Centre after his CFL career. In 2019, he became an Edmonton police officer.
