= Devin Tyler =

American gridiron football player (born 1986)

No. 57
- Position: Offensive lineman

Personal information
- Born: July 2, 1986 (age 40); Washington, D.C., U.S.
- Listed height: 6 ft 7 in (2.01 m)
- Listed weight: 300 lb (136 kg)

Career information
- High school: Suitland (Suitland, Maryland)
- College: Temple

Career history
- 2010: Arizona Cardinals*
- 2010: Baltimore Ravens*
- 2011: Saskatchewan Roughriders*
- 2011–2012: Edmonton Eskimos
- 2013–2014: Saskatchewan Roughriders
- 2014–2015: Winnipeg Blue Bombers
- * Offseason or practice squad member only

Awards and highlights
- Grey Cup champion (2013); Second-team All-MAC (2009)
- Stats at CFL.ca

Devin Tyler (born July 2, 1986) is an American former professional football offensive lineman. He played college football at Temple University. He was a member of the Arizona Cardinals, Baltimore Ravens, Saskatchewan Roughriders, Edmonton Eskimos and Winnipeg Blue Bombers.

== Early life ==
Tyler attended Suitland High School in Forestville, Maryland.

== Professional career ==
Tyler was signed by the Arizona Cardinals of the National Football League (NFL) on April 25, 2010. He was released on July 27, 2010. He was signed by the Baltimore Ravens of the NFL on August 1, 2010. Tyler was released by the Ravens on September 4, 2010. He signed with the Saskatchewan Roughriders of the Canadian Football League (CFL) in May 2011. He was released by the Roughriders in June 2011. Tyler was signed by the CFL's Edmonton Eskimos on August 15, 2011. He played in 22 games with the Eskimos during the 2011 and 2012 seasons. He was released by the Eskimos on December 4, 2012. Tyler signed with Saskatchewan Roughriders of the CFL in July 2013. The Roughriders won the 101st Grey Cup against the Hamilton Tiger-Cats on November 24, 2013. He was released by the Roughriders on August 13, 2014. On August 27, 2014, he was signed to the practice roster of the Winnipeg Blue Bombers' of the CFL. Tyler played in four games, all starts, for the team in 2014. He played in one game, a start, for the Blue Bombers during the 2015 season. He was released by the team on December 7, 2015.

== Personal life ==
Following a fight that occurred at a Washington, D.C. nightclub in 2011, Tyler was arrested by police and tried for assault, whereupon he was found guilty and sentenced to 90 days in jail in May 2012.
