= Dale Stevenson (Canadian football) =

Canadian football player (born 1987)

No. 59
- Position: Fullback

Personal information
- Born: December 8, 1987 (age 38); Raymond, Alberta, Canada
- Listed height: 6 ft 7 in (2.01 m)
- Listed weight: 290 lb (132 kg)

Career information
- High school: Raymond
- College: Alberta

Career history
- 2011–2012: Edmonton Eskimos*
- 2014: Winnipeg Blue Bombers
- * Offseason or practice squad member only
- Stats at CFL.ca

Dale Stevenson (born December 8, 1987) is a Canadian former professional football fullback. He played college football with the Alberta Golden Bears. Playing both sides of the ball, Stevenson spent five years at the University of Alberta at both fullback and defensive end. Dale recorded a career total 20 receptions for 235 yards and one touchdown and three carries for eight yards in 20 games at fullback. His senior year, Dale recorded 30 defensive tackles (24 solo), a Canada West-leading six quarterback sacks and one pass knockdown as a starter for the Bears' defensive line. He played in the 2009 East-West Bowl. He signed as an undrafted free agent with the Eskimos in May 2011.
