= Nathan Coehoorn =

Canadian football player (born 1986)

No. 85
- Position: Wide receiver

Personal information
- Born: September 17, 1986 (age 40); Redcliff, Alberta, Canada
- Listed height: 6 ft 2 in (1.88 m)
- Listed weight: 210 lb (95 kg)

Career information
- High school: Medicine Hat
- University: Calgary
- CFL draft: 2011: 1st round, 5th overall pick

Career history
- 2011–2016: Edmonton Eskimos

Awards and highlights
- Grey Cup champion (2015)
- Stats at CFL.ca

Nathan Joel Coehoorn (born September 17, 1986) is a Canadian former professional football wide receiver who played his entire professional career for the Edmonton Eskimos of the Canadian Football League (CFL). After the 2010 CIS season, he was ranked as the seventh best player in the Canadian Football League’s Amateur Scouting Bureau rankings for players eligible in the 2011 CFL draft, and third by players in the CIS. Coming out of college his top assets were speed, aggression and good hands. He was drafted fifth overall in the draft by the Eskimos and signed with the team on May 31, 2011. He played CIS football with the Calgary Dinos. On August 20, 2013 his contract was extended through the 2015 CFL season.

Coehoorn played six season for the Eskimos, catching 211 passes for 2,376 yards with 6 touchdowns. He won the 103rd Grey Cup to conclude the 2015 season. On April 10, 2017, Coehoorn announced his retirement at the age of 30 via Instagram because of concussion related health concerns.

== Personal life ==
Coehoorn got married in late 2014. He welcomed his daughter, Greyce, with his wife Teagan on December 5, 2015.
