= T. J. Hill =

American gridiron football player (born 1980)

No. 12, 21
- Position: Linebacker

Personal information
- Born: July 2, 1980 (age 46); Paterson, New Jersey, U.S.
- Listed height: 5 ft 9 in (1.75 m)
- Listed weight: 195 lb (88 kg)

Career information
- High school: Rosa L. Parks
- College: Northeastern

Career history
- 2002: Kansas City Chiefs*
- 2003: Las Vegas Gladiators
- 2003: New York Giants
- 2004–2006: Las Vegas Gladiators
- 2007–2008: Montreal Alouettes
- 2009–2013: Edmonton Eskimos
- 2014: Ottawa Redblacks
- * Offseason or practice squad member only

Awards and highlights
- CFL East All-Star (2008); Eskimos' Most Outstanding Defensive Player (2009)
- Stats at CFL.ca

Tororris Jermal "T. J." Hill (born July 2, 1980) is an American former professional football linebacker. He was signed by the Kansas City Chiefs as an undrafted free agent in 2002. He played college football at Northeastern.

Hill was also a member of the Las Vegas Gladiators, New York Giants, Montreal Alouettes, Edmonton Eskimos, and Ottawa Redblacks.
