= Donovan Alexander =

Canadian gridiron football player (born 1985)

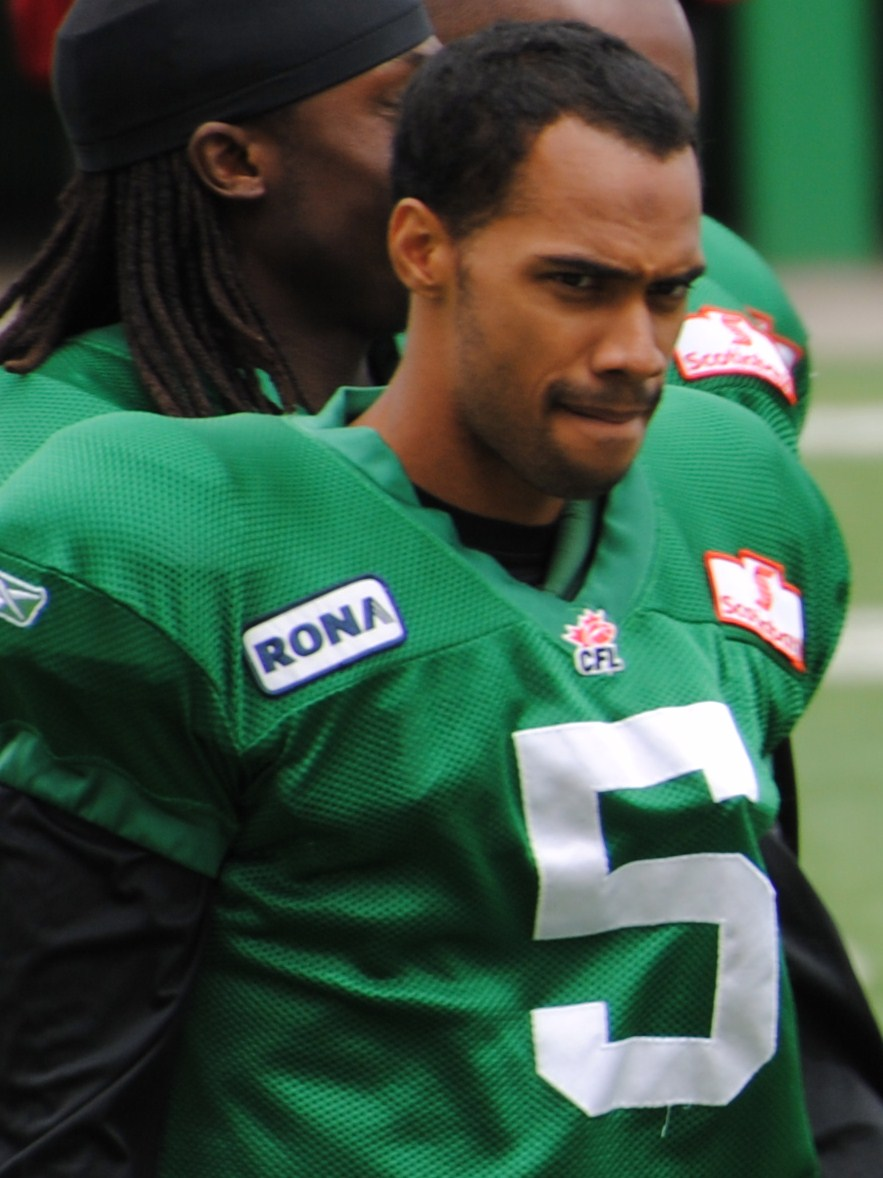

No. 4
- Positions: Safety, Cornerback

Personal information
- Born: April 3, 1985 (age 41); Winnipeg, Manitoba
- Listed height: 6 ft 0 in (1.83 m)
- Listed weight: 180 lb (82 kg)

Career information
- High school: St. Paul's
- College: North Dakota
- CFL draft: 2007: 3rd round, 23rd overall pick

Career history
- 2008: Seattle Seahawks*
- 2008: Montreal Alouettes
- 2009–2010: Saskatchewan Roughriders
- 2011–2013: Edmonton Eskimos
- 2014: Winnipeg Blue Bombers
- * Offseason or practice squad member only

Awards and highlights
- CFL West All-Star (2012)
- Stats at CFL.ca (archive)

Donovan Eaton Alexander (born April 3, 1985) is a Canadian former professional football defensive back. He was drafted by the Montreal Alouettes in the third round of the 2007 CFL draft. He was signed by the Seattle Seahawks as an undrafted free agent in 2008 and upon his release, signed with the Alouettes that same year. He later played for the Saskatchewan Roughriders for two seasons and the Edmonton Eskimos for three before signing with Winnipeg. In 2012, he was named a West All-Star with the Eskimos. He played college football at North Dakota. He retired in November, 2014.

== Personal life ==
He was born to Derek and Marilyn Alexander. He also has two older brothers, Wyatt and David. Donovan started playing football when he was 9 years old. Football wasn't the only sport he was interested in as he loved to play basketball as well. The first football team he played for was the Charleswood Broncos. He played high school football for the St. Paul Crusaders of Winnipeg. In college Donovan studied communications which entailed conflict resolution, media broadcasting and interpersonal communication. He is now pursuing a career as an educator in Winnipeg Manitoba. He coached the school's sports teams until 2022. Donovan is married to his wife Jennifer and has two kids Lincoln (Link) and Yvette (Ivy) Alexander.
