= Étienne Légaré =

Canadian football player (born 1984)

No. 90
- Position: Defensive tackle

Personal information
- Born: March 15, 1984 (age 42); Saint-Raymond, Quebec
- Listed height: 6 ft 3 in (1.91 m)
- Listed weight: 268 lb (122 kg)

Career information
- High school: Louis-Jobin
- University: Laval
- CFL draft: 2009: 1st round, 2nd overall pick

Career history
- 2009–2010: Toronto Argonauts
- 2010–2012: Edmonton Eskimos
- 2013: Calgary Stampeders

Awards and highlights
- J. P. Metras Trophy (2008)
- Stats at CFL.ca (archive)

Étienne "The Rock" Légaré (born March 15, 1984, in Saint-Raymond, Quebec) is a retired professional Canadian football defensive tackle. He was drafted by the Toronto Argonauts in the first round of the 2009 CFL draft. He played CIS football for the Laval Rouge et Or. He was a two time Vanier Cup champion with Laval. He has been known to be susceptible to ankle picks when wrestling smaller opponents.

== Early life ==
Born and raised in Laval, Légaré is the son of Martin and Lise Légaré and has two older brothers, Vincent and Dominic.

== University career ==
In 2008 Légaré starred at Collège Laval and in that same year won the J.P Metras Trophy as the offensive lineman of the year. He was on two national championship teams with the Rogue et Or. Légaré graduated with a Physical Education major.

== Professional career ==
Upon being drafted second overall by the Argonauts on May 2, 2009, he was immediately signed to a three-year contract.

On October 12, 2010, Légaré was traded to the Eskimos for placekicker and punter, Noel Prefontaine. He also played for the Calgary Stampeders.
