= Damaso Munoz =

American gridiron football player and coach (born 1986)

Rutgers Scarlet Knights
- Title: Defensive assistant

Personal information
- Born: July 10, 1986 (age 40); Brooklyn, New York, U.S.
- Listed height: 5 ft 11 in (1.80 m)
- Listed weight: 220 lb (100 kg)

Career information
- High school: Miami Southridge (Miami, Florida)
- College: Rutgers
- NFL draft: 2010: undrafted

Career history

Playing
- Edmonton Eskimos (2011–2013); Tampa Bay Buccaneers (2014)*; Ottawa Redblacks (2014–2016)
- * Offseason or practice squad member only

Coaching
- Rutgers (2020–present) Defensive assistant

Awards and highlights
- Grey Cup champion (2016); CFL East All-Star (2016)
- Stats at Pro Football Reference
- Stats at CFL.ca

Damaso Munoz (born July 10, 1986) is an American former professional football linebacker. He played college football for Rutgers. After spending 2010 training camp with the Chicago Bears, he played for the Edmonton Eskimos of the Canadian Football League from 2011 to 2013. He signed with the Buccaneers on February 19, 2014. He signed with the Ottawa Redblacks on September 15, 2014.

== Playing career ==
Pre-draft measurables
Height	Weight	40-yard dash	10-yard split	20-yard split	20-yard shuttle	Three-cone drill	Vertical jump	Broad jump	Bench press
5 ft 10 5/8 in (1.79 m)	221 lb (100 kg)	4.54 s	1.64 s	2.56 s	4.20 s	6.96 s	35.0 in (0.89 m)	9 ft 9 in (2.97 m)	25 reps
All values from Pro Day

After his college career at Rutgers, Muñoz had a tryout with the Chicago Bears as an undrafted free agent in 2010. He never got a contract, so he went north to the CFL. He played six seasons in the Canadian Football League, playing with the Edmonton Eskimos and Ottawa Redblacks. In between his time with the Eskimos and the Redblacks, he went back to the NFL playing for Tampa Bay in training camp, however once again he didn’t make the roster. He served a captain for the Redblacks in 2016 and in 2015 earned the team’s defensive player of the year.
