= Jermaine Reid =

Canadian football player (born 1983)

No. 98
- Position: Defensive tackle

Personal information
- Born: April 19, 1983 (age 43); Toronto, Ontario, Canada
- Listed height: 6 ft 4 in (1.93 m)
- Listed weight: 275 lb (125 kg)

Career information
- High school: St. Mary
- College: Akron
- CFL draft: 2006: 2nd round, 9th overall pick

Career history
- 2007–2010: Hamilton Tiger-Cats
- 2011–2012: Edmonton Eskimos
- 2013: Toronto Argonauts
- 2013: BC Lions
- Stats at CFL.ca

Jermaine Reid (born April 19, 1983) is a Canadian former professional football defensive tackle. He was traded to the Argonauts by the Edmonton Eskimos on March 22, 2013. He was drafted by the Tiger-Cats in the second round of the 2006 CFL draft. He played college football for the Akron Zips.
