= Kyle Koch =

Canadian football player (born 1984)

Profile
- Position: Center

Personal information
- Born: December 10, 1984 (age 41); Kenora, Ontario
- Listed height: 6 ft 2 in (1.88 m)
- Listed weight: 310 lb (141 kg)

Career information
- High school: Beaver Brae
- College: McMaster

Career history
- Winnipeg Blue Bombers; Edmonton Eskimos; Toronto Argonauts
- Stats at CFL.ca

Kyle Koch (born December 10, 1984) is a Canadian former professional football offensive linemen who played in the Canadian Football League. He played CIS Football for the McMaster Marauders. He was originally signed by the Winnipeg Blue Bombers as an undrafted free agent in 2007. From 2009-2012, Koch played with the Edmonton Eskimos. On September 10, 2013, Koch signed with the Toronto Argonauts. On May 16, 2014, Koch retired from Canadian football.
