= Mike Cornell =

Canadian football player (born 1986)

Michael Cornell
No. 49
- Positions: Linebacker, Running back, Defensive lineman

Personal information
- Born: December 5, 1986 (age 39); Hamilton, Ontario
- Listed height: 5 ft 8 in (1.73 m)
- Listed weight: 435 lb (197 kg)

Career information
- High school: Cathedral
- University: Ottawa
- CFL draft: 2009: undrafted

Career history
- 2010: Calgary Stampeders
- 2011–2013: Edmonton Eskimos
- 2014: Winnipeg Blue Bombers
- Stats at CFL.ca

Michael Cornell (born December 5, 1986) is a Canadian former professional football linebacker. He went undrafted in the 2009 CFL draft. He played CIS football for the Ottawa Gee-Gees. He started his professional career playing for the Calgary Stampeders of the Canadian Football League, but was released on May 10, 2011. His last season was in 2014, when he played for the Winnipeg Blue Bombers of the CFL.
