= Scott Mitchell (offensive lineman) =

Canadian football player (born 1989)

Profile
- Position: Offensive tackle

Personal information
- Born: September 10, 1989 (age 37); Ottawa, Ontario, Canada
- Listed height: 6 ft 4 in (1.93 m)
- Listed weight: 295 lb (134 kg)

Career information
- High school: St. Mark
- College: Rice
- CFL draft: 2011: 1st round, 2nd overall pick

Career history
- 2011–2013: Edmonton Eskimos
- 2014–2015: Toronto Argonauts
- Stats at CFL.ca (archive)

Scott Mitchell (born September 10, 1989) is a Canadian former professional football offensive linemen who last played with the Toronto Argonauts. In the Canadian Football League’s Amateur Scouting Bureau final rankings, he was ranked as the best player for players eligible in the 2011 CFL draft. He was then drafted second overall by the Edmonton Eskimos in the draft and signed with the team on May 31, 2011. After playing for three seasons with the Eskimos, he signed as a free agent with the Argonauts. He played college football with the Rice Owls.

His sister, Seanna, has represented Canada at several international swimming competitions and won a bronze medal as a member of its 4x100 freestyle relay.
