= Greg Wojt =

Polish gridiron football player (born 1985)

No. 66
- Position: Offensive lineman

Personal information
- Born: November 22, 1985 (age 40); Warsaw, Poland
- Listed height: 6 ft 4 in (1.93 m)
- Listed weight: 300 lb (136 kg)

Career information
- High school: Father Michael Goetz
- College: Central Michigan
- CFL draft: 2008: 2nd round, 11th overall pick

Career history
- 2009–2012: Edmonton Eskimos
- 2013–2014: Hamilton Tiger-Cats
- 2015–2016: Edmonton Eskimos

Awards and highlights
- Grey Cup champion (2015); CFL West All-Star (2011); CFL East All-Star (2013)
- Stats at CFL.ca

Greg Wojt (born November 22, 1985) is a Polish-Canadian former professional football offensive lineman who played in the Canadian Football League (CFL). He was born in Warsaw, Poland, and raised in Mississauga, Ontario. He was selected by the Edmonton Eskimos in the second round of the 2008 CFL draft and played four years for the club before being traded to the Hamilton Tiger-Cats. Wojt was a nominee for the CFL's Most Outstanding Offensive Lineman Award in 2011 and 2013. He played college football for the Central Michigan Chippewas. He currently teaches and coaches football at St. Michael's College School.
