= Ted Laurent =

Canadian gridiron football player (born 1988)

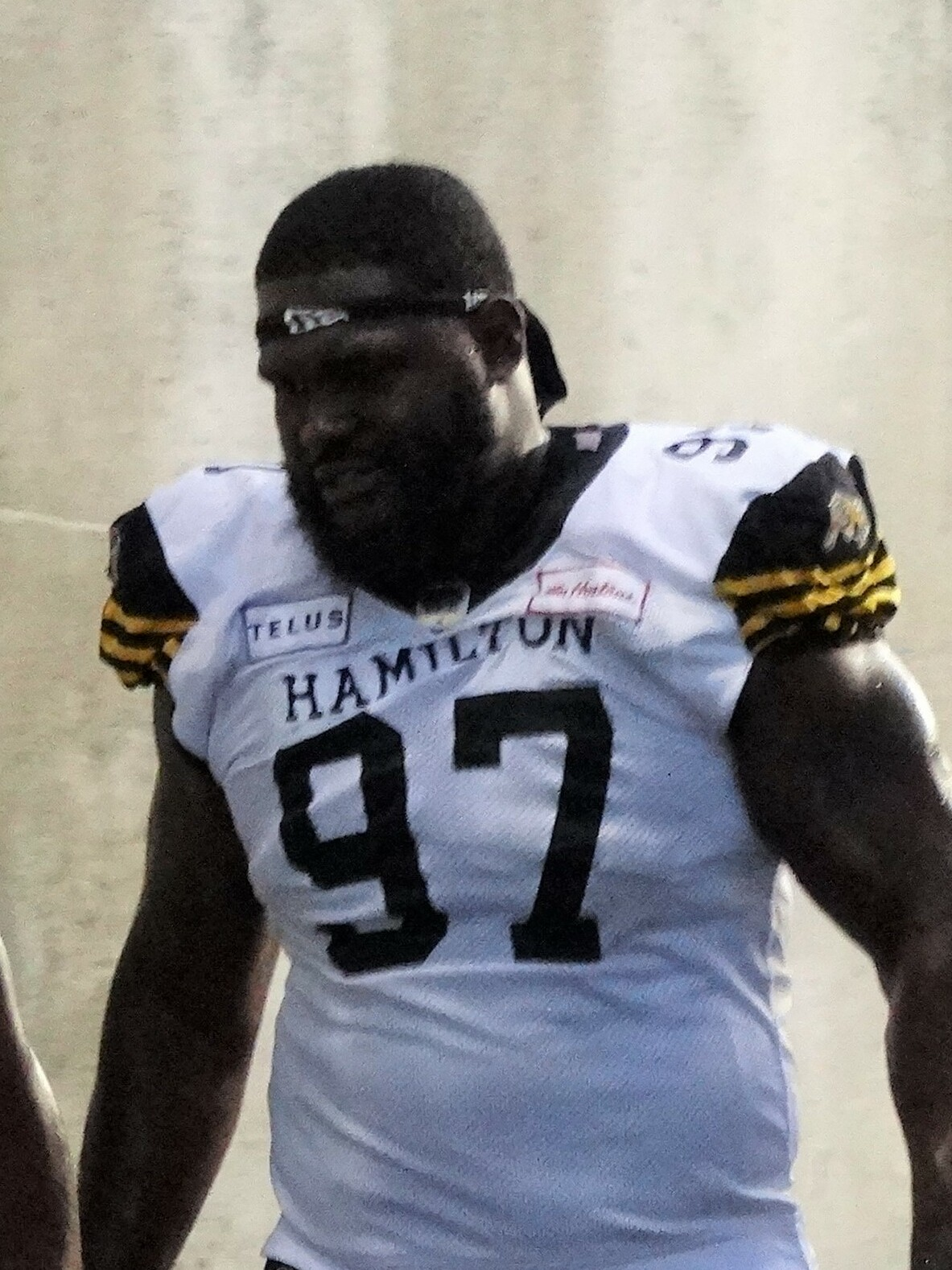
- Laurent with the Hamilton Tiger-Cats in 2022

No. 97
- Position: Defensive tackle

Personal information
- Born: January 1, 1988 (age 38); Montreal, Quebec, Canada
- Listed height: 6 ft 1 in (1.85 m)
- Listed weight: 305 lb (138 kg)

Career information
- High school: McEachern (Powder Springs, Georgia)
- College: Mississippi
- CFL draft: 2011: Supplemental 2nd round

Career history
- 2011–2013: Edmonton Eskimos
- 2014–2023: Hamilton Tiger-Cats

Awards and highlights
- 2× CFL All-Star (2014, 2015); 4× CFL East All-Star (2014, 2015, 2016, 2018); CFL West All-Star (2012); Lew Hayman Trophy (2014)
- Stats at CFL.ca

Farell Ted Laurent (born January 1, 1988) is a Canadian former professional football defensive lineman who played in the Canadian Football League (CFL) for the Edmonton Eskimos and Hamilton Tiger-Cats.

== College career ==
Laurent played college football for the Ole Miss Rebels.

== Professional career ==
=== Edmonton Eskimos ===
Laurent was drafted in the second round in the 2011 CFL supplemental draft, costing the Edmonton Eskimos a second round draft choice in the 2012 CFL draft. He signed with the team on June 2, 2011. In three seasons with the Eskimos, he played in 48 games where he recorded 65 defensive tackles, 11 sacks, and one force fumble. He became a free agent upon the expiry of his contract on February 11, 2014.

=== Hamilton Tiger-Cats ===
On June 1, 2014, Laurent signed with the Hamilton Tiger-Cats. In his first season with his new team, he had 22 defensive tackles, nine sacks, and one forced fumble. He was awarded the Lew Hayman Trophy in 2014 for being the most outstanding Canadian player in the East Division. He announced his retirement on May 12, 2024.

== Personal life ==
Laurent was born to parents Farell and Yvette Laurent.
