= Hugh Charles =

American gridiron football player (born 1986)

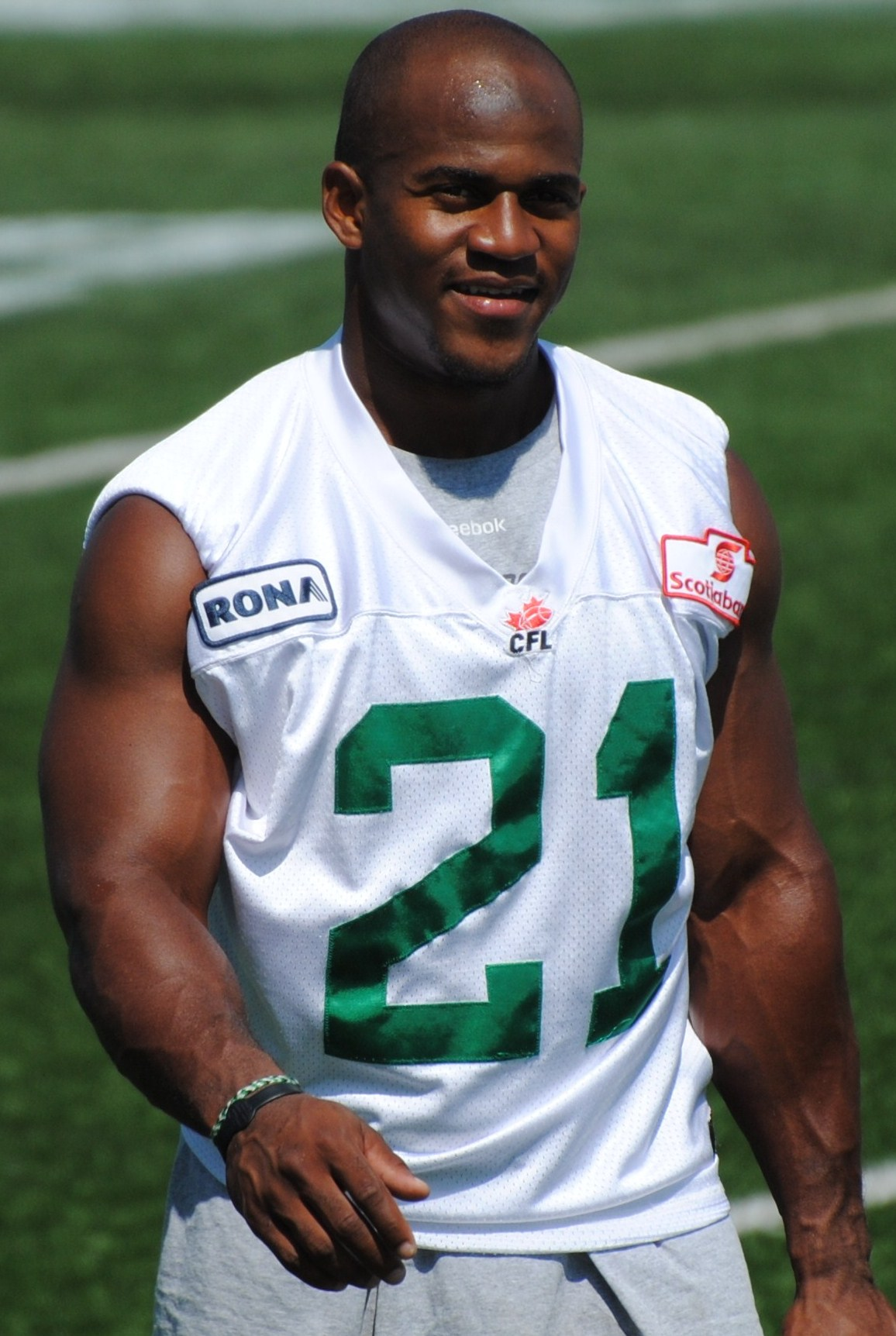
- Charles with the Saskatchewan Roughriders in 2010

No. 32, 38, 21, 7, 5, 33
- Position: Running back

Personal information
- Born: January 7, 1986 (age 40); Tulsa, Oklahoma, U.S.
- Listed height: 5 ft 8 in (1.73 m)
- Listed weight: 195 lb (88 kg)

Career information
- High school: Keller (Keller, Texas)
- College: Colorado (2004–2007)

Career history
- 2008–2011: Saskatchewan Roughriders
- 2011–2013: Edmonton Eskimos
- 2014: Saskatchewan Roughriders
- 2014: Calgary Stampeders
- 2015: Ottawa Redblacks*
- * Offseason or practice squad member only

Awards and highlights
- Grey Cup champion (2014)
- Stats at CFL.ca (archive)

Hugh Charles (born January 7, 1986) is an American former professional football running back who played in the Canadian Football League (CFL). He played college football at Colorado.

== Early life ==
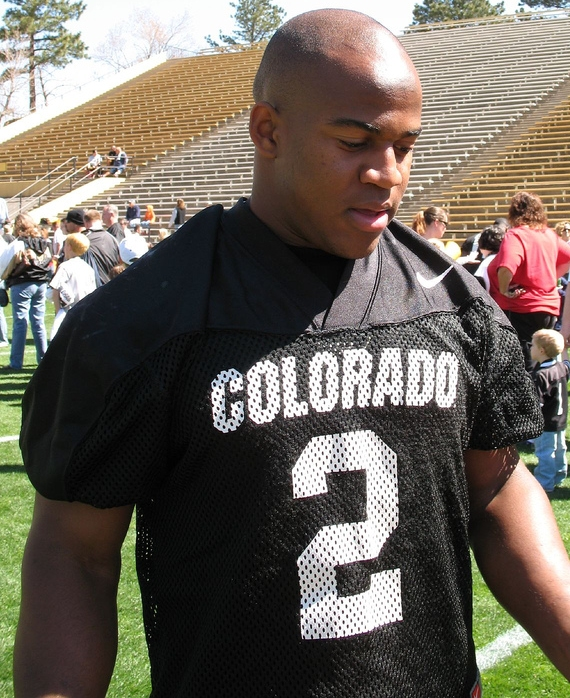
Charles at Colorado in 2007

Hugh Charles was born on January 7, 1986, in Tulsa, Oklahoma. He attended Keller High School in Keller, Texas.

Charles was a four-year letterman from Colorado Buffaloes of the University of Colorado Boulder from 2004 to 2007. He rushed for 2,795 yards and 16 touchdowns during his college career, including 1,058 yards and eight touchdowns as a senior.

== Professional career ==
=== Saskatchewan Roughriders (first stint) ===
In Charles' first season in the Canadian Football League, the 2008 CFL season, he only played in 2 games. In the following 2 seasons with the Roughriders Charles received minimal playing time, only accumulating 50 carries for 315 yards, with 5 touchdowns, in 3 years combined. Charles played the beginning of the 2011 CFL season with the Riders, appearing in 7 games. Charles was traded to Edmonton from Saskatchewan on Oct. 12, 2011 in exchange for a conditional selection in the 2014 CFL draft.

=== Edmonton Eskimos ===
For the remainder of the 2011 season Charles only played in 2 games with the Eskimos. The 2012 CFL season was a breakout year for Charles. Charles played in 16 games of the 18 game regular season. He received 170 carries for 887 yards, with 6 rushing touchdowns. He added 32 pass receptions for 522 yards and 2 receiving touchdowns. On October 12, 2012, he also completed his first pass attempt, for 14 yards.

Charles played in 15 games in the 2013 CFL season: He missed a few games because of an injured hamstring. Charles received less rushing attempts in 2013 than he had in 2012, down to 112 for the season. He gained 605 yards on the ground with those carries and recorded 3 rushing touchdowns. Following the season Hugh Charles was re-signed by Edmonton through the 2015 CFL season. On June 21, 2014, just after the close of the CFL preseason, Charles was one of the final cuts for the Eskimos.

=== Saskatchewan Roughriders (second stint) ===
Charles appeared in only one game with the Roughriders, rushing for 86 yards on 13 carries.

=== Calgary Stampeders ===
Charles was signed by Calgary on July 28, 2014. He was released on January 15, 2015.

=== Ottawa Redblacks ===
Charles was signed to the practice roster of the Ottawa Redblacks on October 29, 2015.
