= 2011 Hamilton Tiger-Cats season =

Season of Canadian Football League team the Hamilton Tiger-Cats

- General manager: Bob O'Billovich
- Head coach: Marcel Bellefeuille
- Home stadium: Ivor Wynne Stadium

Results
- Record: 8–10
- Division place: 3rd, East
- Playoffs: Lost East Final
- Team MOP: Justin Hickman
- Team MOC: Dave Stala
- Team MOR: Chris Williams

Uniform

The 2011 Hamilton Tiger-Cats season was the 54th season for the team in the Canadian Football League (CFL) and their 62nd overall. The Tiger-Cats finished third place in the East Division with an 8–10 record. After hosting the East Semi-Final in 2009 and 2010 with no success, the Tiger-Cats had to go on the road for the 2011 playoffs since they finished third in the East. In the East Semi-Final, the Ti-Cats upset the two-time defending Grey Cup champions, Montreal Alouettes, 52–44 in overtime, giving them their first playoff victory since 2001. The Ti-Cats then traveled to Winnipeg to play the Blue Bombers where they lost 19–3 in the East Final.

== Offseason ==
=== CFL draft ===
The 2011 CFL draft took place on Sunday, May 8, 2011. The Tiger-Cats had six selections in the draft with their first coming in the second round with the 10th pick overall. The team traded their first round pick, which was 5th overall, to Edmonton for two second round picks. With those picks, Hamilton selected the 10th ranked Moe Petrus from the University of Connecticut and quickly followed with Maurice Forbes of Concordia with the 13th overall pick.

Round	Pick	Player	Position	School/Club team
2	10	Moe Petrus	OL	Connecticut
2	13	Maurice Forbes	DL	Concordia
3	20	Marc-Antoine Fortin	DL	Laval
3	21	Pascal Baillargeon	OL	Laval
5	33	Patrick Jean-Mary	LB	Howard
5	36	Tyrell Francisco	TE	Weber State
6	44	Jadon Wagner	LB	BYU

== Preseason ==
Week	Date	Opponent	Score	Result	Attendance	Record
A	Sat, June 18	at Toronto Argonauts	31–12	Loss	12,851	0–1
B	Wed, June 22	Montreal Alouettes	57–20	Win	26,732	1–1

== Regular season ==
=== Season standings ===
East Division
Team	GP	W	L	T	PF	PA	Pts	
Winnipeg Blue Bombers	18	10	8	0	432	432	20	Details
Montreal Alouettes	18	10	8	0	515	468	20	Details
Hamilton Tiger-Cats	18	8	10	0	481	478	16	Details
Toronto Argonauts	18	6	12	0	397	498	12	Details

=== Season schedule ===
Week	Date	Opponent	Score	Result	Attendance	Record
1	Fri, July 1	Winnipeg Blue Bombers	24–16	Loss	23,852	0–1
2	Sat, July 9	at Edmonton Eskimos	28–10	Loss	26,059	0–2
3	Sat, July 16	Saskatchewan Roughriders	33–3	Win	22,245	1–2
4	Fri, July 22	at BC Lions	39–31	Win	24,117	2–2
5	Fri, July 29	Montreal Alouettes	34–26	Win	24,068	3–2
6	Sat, Aug 6	at Calgary Stampeders	32–20	Loss	29,307	3–3
7	Sat, Aug 13	Toronto Argonauts	37–32	Win	24,347	4–3
8	Bye					4–3
9	Fri, Aug 26	at Winnipeg Blue Bombers	30–27	Loss	30,338	4–4
10	Mon, Sept 5	Montreal Alouettes	44–21	Win	26,694	5–4
11	Sun, Sept 11	at Montreal Alouettes	43–13	Loss	24,304	5–5
12	Fri, Sept 16	Edmonton Eskimos	38–23	Loss	22,654	5–6
13	Sun, Sept 25	Calgary Stampeders	55–36	Win	20,153	6–6
14	Sat, Oct 1	at Toronto Argonauts	27–12	Win	21,853	7–6
15	Fri, Oct 7	Winnipeg Blue Bombers	33–17	Loss	23,268	7–7
16	Sun, Oct 16	at Montreal Alouettes	27–25	Loss	23,668	7–8
17	Sat, Oct 22	BC Lions	42–10	Win	25,536	8–8
18	Sat, Oct 29	at Saskatchewan Roughriders	19–3	Loss	29,073	8–9
19	Thurs, Nov 3	at Toronto Argonauts	33–16	Loss	20,833	8–10

== Roster ==
2011 Hamilton Tiger-Cats final roster
Quarterbacks: 16 Jason Boltus; 5 Kevin Glenn; 12 Quinton Porter; Running backs: 0 Darcy Brown; 22 Avon Cobourne; 24 Daryl Stephenson; 8 Marcus Thigpen; Receivers: 86 Matt Carter; 84 Bakari Grant; 81 Aaron Kelly; 17 Liam Mahoney; 88 Dave Stala; 80 Chris Williams	Offensive linemen: 53 Mark Dewit C; 67 Peter Dyakowski G; 56 Belton Johnson T; 65 Simeon Rottier G; 59 Brian Simmons T; 52 Wayne Smith G; Defensive linemen: 47 Ivan Brown DE; 95 Justin Hickman DE; 90 Luc Mullinder DT; 92 Rob Rose DT; 98 Eddie Steele DT; Special teams: 7 Justin Medlock K/P; 30 Kevin Scott LS	Linebackers: 39 Agustín Barrenechea; 28 Jamall Johnson; 49 Kyle Jones; 45 Nathan Kanya; 25 Markeith Knowlton; 44 Ray Mariuz; 8 Renauld Williams; Defensive backs: 3 Marc Beswick; 31 Milt Collins; 34 Ryan Hinds; 41 Jonathan Hood; 29 Loyce Means; 7 Bo Smith; 4 Carlos Thomas; 18 Dee Webb; 26 Ray Wladichuk; 37 Marcell Young	Reserve roster: 55 Stevie Baggs DE; 60 Jason Jimenez T; 2 Jason Shivers DB; Practice roster: 33 Byron Bullock LB; 63 Nick Claytor T; 94 Angelo Craig DE; 42 Brandon Denson LB; 99 Maurice Forbes DT; 57 Cody Husband T; 14 Terence Jeffers-Harris WR; 11 Jeremy Kelley SB; 13 Josh Maveety K/P; 23 Daniel Porter RB; 97 Darius Powell DE; 66 Adam Rogers G; 58 Neil Puffer LS	Injured list: 20 Dylan Barker DB; 36 Isaac Brown LB; 48 Yannick Carter LB; 21 Terry Grant RB; 62 Marwan Hage C; 93 Matt Kirk DT; 15 Glenn MacKay WR; 32 Chris Rwabukamba DB; 19 Woodny Turenne DB; Italics indicate International player

== Coaching staff ==
2011 Hamilton Tiger-Cats staff
Front office: Owner – Bob Young; President – Scott Mitchell; General manager – Bob O'Billovich; Assistant general manager/director of player personnel – Joe Womack; Director of football operations – Shawn Burke; Canadian player development coordinator and head Canadian scout – Drew Allemang; Head U.S. Scout – Danny McManus; Western regional scout – Richard Wade; Head coaches: Head coach – Marcel Bellefeuille; Assistant head coach – Brad Miller; Offensive coaches: Offensive coordinator – Khari Jones; Receivers – Tim Kearse; Running backs – Rick Worman; Offensive line – Doug Malone; Offensive assistant – Vince Luciani	Defensive coaches: Defensive coordinator/defensive backs – Corey Chamblin; Linebackers – Brad Miller; Defensive line – John Kropke; Defensive assistant – Dwayne Cameron; Special teams coaches: Special teams coordinator – Brad Miller; Special teams assistant – Scott Fawcett; → Coaching staff

== Playoffs ==
=== Schedule ===
Game	Date	Time	Opponent	Score	Result	Attendance
East Semi-Final	Nov 13	1:00 PM EST	at Montreal Alouettes	52–44 (OT)	Win	33,051
East Final	Nov 20	1:00 PM EST	at Winnipeg Blue Bombers	19–3	Loss	30,051

=== Playoff bracket ===
November 13: Division Semi-Finals
East
E3	Hamilton Tiger-Cats	52*
E2	Montreal Alouettes	44
West
W3	Calgary Stampeders	19
W2	Edmonton Eskimos	33

November 20: Division Finals
E3	Hamilton Tiger-Cats	3
E1	Winnipeg Blue Bombers	19
W2	Edmonton Eskimos	23
W1	BC Lions	40

November 27: 99th Grey Cup; BC Place Stadium – Vancouver
E1	Winnipeg Blue Bombers	23
W1	BC Lions	34

*-Team won in Overtime.

=== East Semi-Final ===
Hamilton at Montreal

Team	1	2	3	4	OT	Total
• Tiger-Cats	10	14	3	17	8	52
Alouettes	3	13	7	21	0	44

- Date: November 13
- Location: Olympic Stadium
  Montreal, QC
- Game start: 1:00 PM EST
- Game attendance: 33,051
- Game weather: None (Dome)
- Referee: Kim Murphy
- TV announcers (TSN): Chris Cuthbert (Play by Play), Glen Suitor (Colour)

=== East Final ===
Hamilton at Winnipeg

Team	1	2	3	4	Total
Tiger-Cats	3	0	0	0	3
• Blue Bombers	0	10	3	6	19

- Date: November 20
- Location: Canad Inns Stadium
  Winnipeg, MB
- Game start: 1:00 PM EST
- Game attendance: 30,051
- Game weather: Clear; −13 °C; wind 19 km/h S
- Referee: Andre Proulx
- TV announcers (TSN): Rod Black (Play by Play), Duane Forde (Colour), Sara Orlesky (Sideline)
