= 2011 Montreal Alouettes season =

Canadian football team season

- General manager: Jim Popp
- Head coach: Marc Trestman
- Home stadium: Percival Molson Memorial Stadium

Results
- Record: 10–8
- Division place: 2nd, East
- Playoffs: Lost East Semi-Final
- Team MOP: Anthony Calvillo
- Team MOC: Sean Whyte
- Team MOR: Seth Williams

Uniform

The 2011 Montreal Alouettes season was the 45th season for the team in the Canadian Football League (CFL) and their 57th overall. The Alouettes finished in second place in the East Division with a 10–8 record. The Alouettes attempted to three-peat as Grey Cup champions, after winning back-to-back championships in 2009 and 2010, but lost to the Hamilton Tiger-Cats in the East Semi-Final game. The Alouettes opened their training camp at Bishop's University in Sherbrooke, Quebec on June 5.

== Offseason ==
=== CFL draft ===
The 2011 CFL draft took place on Sunday, May 8, 2011. The Alouettes had seven selections in the draft, including the eighth overall pick, which they used to select placekicker and punter Brody McKnight. Montreal came into draft day needing a kicker, and traded a 2012 first round pick for Sean Whyte. Because McKnight has one more year of eligibility, he will not be able to join the Alouettes until 2012. Other notables in the draft include Vaughn Martin, who was ranked as the sixth overall prospect, but his draft stock dropped immensely due to the fact that he had already been with the NFL's San Diego Chargers for two years. Should Martin choose to enter the CFL at any point in his career, the Alouettes would hold the rights to sign him.

| Round | Pick | Player | Position | School/Club team |
|---|---|---|---|---|
| 1 | 8 | Brody McKnight | K/P | Montana |
| 2 | 16 | Anthony Barrette | OL | Concordia |
| 3 | 23 | Philip Blake | OL | Baylor |
| 4 | 25 | Renaldo Sagesse | DL | Michigan |
| 4 | 31 | Reed Alexander | OL | Calgary |
| 5 | 39 | Vaughn Martin | DL | Western Ontario |
| 6 | 47 | Blaine Ruttan | LB | Carson-Newman |

=== Notable transactions ===
| Date | Type | Incoming | Outgoing | Team |
|---|---|---|---|---|
| January 26, 2011 | Retirement | – | Ben Cahoon (SB) | Montreal Alouettes |
| January 28, 2011 | Re-Signing | Anthony Calvillo (QB) | – | Montreal Alouettes |

== Preseason ==
| Week | Date | Opponent | Venue | Score | Result | Attendance | Record |
|---|---|---|---|---|---|---|---|
| A | Thurs, June 16 | Winnipeg Blue Bombers | Molson Stadium | 27–15 | Win | 21,223 | 1–0 |
| B | Wed, June 22 | at Hamilton Tiger-Cats | Ivor Wynne Stadium | 57–20 | Loss | 26,732 | 1–1 |

# Games played with white uniforms.

== Regular season ==
=== Season standings ===
East Division
| Team | GP | W | L | T | PF | PA | Pts | |
|---|---|---|---|---|---|---|---|---|
| Winnipeg Blue Bombers | 18 | 10 | 8 | 0 | 432 | 432 | 20 | Details |
| Montreal Alouettes | 18 | 10 | 8 | 0 | 515 | 468 | 20 | Details |
| Hamilton Tiger-Cats | 18 | 8 | 10 | 0 | 481 | 478 | 16 | Details |
| Toronto Argonauts | 18 | 6 | 12 | 0 | 397 | 498 | 12 | Details |

=== Season schedule ===
| Week | Date | Opponent | Venue | Score | Result | Attendance | Record |
|---|---|---|---|---|---|---|---|
| 1 | Thurs, June 30 | BC Lions | Molson Stadium | 30–26 | Win | 22,317 | 1–0 |
| 2 | Sat, July 9 | at Saskatchewan Roughriders | Mosaic Stadium | 39–25 | Win | 30,045 | 2–0 |
| 3 | Fri, July 15 | Toronto Argonauts | Molson Stadium | 40–17 | Win | 24,698 | 3–0 |
| 4 | Sun, July 24 | Saskatchewan Roughriders | Molson Stadium | 27–24 | Loss | 24,434 | 3–1 |
| 5 | Fri, July 29 | at Hamilton Tiger-Cats | Ivor Wynne Stadium | 34–26 | Loss | 24,068 | 3–2 |
| 6 | Thurs, Aug 4 | at Toronto Argonauts | Rogers Centre | 36–23 | Win | 19,204 | 4–2 |
| 7 | Thurs, Aug 11 | Edmonton Eskimos | Molson Stadium | 27–4 | Win | 24,448 | 5–2 |
| 8 | Bye | | | | | | 5–2 |
| 9 | Sat, Aug 27 | at Calgary Stampeders | McMahon Stadium | 38–31 | Loss | 30,386 | 5–3 |
| 10 | Mon, Sept 5 | at Hamilton Tiger-Cats | Ivor Wynne Stadium | 44–21 | Loss | 26,964 | 5–4 |
| 11 | Sun, Sept 11 | Hamilton Tiger-Cats | Molson Stadium | 43–13 | Win | 24,304 | 6–4 |
| 12 | Sun, Sept 18 | Winnipeg Blue Bombers | Molson Stadium | 25–23 | Loss | 24,642 | 6–5 |
| 13 | Fri, Sept 23 | at Edmonton Eskimos | Commonwealth Stadium | 34–21 | Win | 40,274 | 7–5 |
| 14 | Fri, Sept 30 | at Winnipeg Blue Bombers | Canad Inns Stadium | 32–26 | Win | 30,447 | 8–5 |
| 15 | Mon, Oct 10 | Toronto Argonauts | Molson Stadium | 29–19 | Win | 23,960 | 9–5 |
| 16 | Sun, Oct 16 | Hamilton Tiger-Cats | Molson Stadium | 27–25 | Win | 23,668 | 10–5 |
| 17 | Sat, Oct 22 | at Winnipeg Blue Bombers | Canad Inns Stadium | 26–25 | Loss | 30,360 | 10–6 |
| 18 | Sun, Oct 30 | Calgary Stampeders | Molson Stadium | 32–27 | Loss | 24,051 | 10–7 |
| 19 | Sat, Nov 5 | at BC Lions | BC Place Stadium | 43–1 | Loss | 35,454 | 10–8 |

# Games played with colour uniforms.
# Games played with white uniforms.

== Roster ==
2011 Montreal Alouettes final roster
| Quarterbacks: 13 Anthony Calvillo; 5 Adrian McPherson; 4 Ricky Santos; Running backs: 8 Kerry Carter; 30 Dahrran Diedrick; 2 Brandon Whitaker; Receivers: 0 Bo Bowling; 85 Brian Bratton; 80 Éric Deslauriers; 82 Danny Desriveaux; 19 S. J. Green; 14 Brandon London; 3 Tim Maypray; 18 Jamel Richardson | Offensive linemen: 64 Ryan Bomben G; 58 Luc Brodeur-Jourdain C; 57 Scott Flory G; 61 Jeraill McCuller T; 54 Jeff Perrett T; 60 Andrew Woodruff G; Defensive linemen: 96 J.P. Bekasiak DT; 7 John Bowman DE; 95 Moton Hopkins DT; 90 Chima Ihekwoaba DE; 29 Kitwana Jones DE; 9 Anwar Stewart DE; 69 Eric Wilson DT | Linebackers: 10 Marc-Olivier Brouillette OLB; 11 Chip Cox OLB; 38 Curtis Dublanko OLB; 40 Diamond Ferri OLB; 52 Ramon Guzman MLB/OLB; 44 Brian Ridgeway OLB; 46 Walter Spencer MLB; 42 Bear Woods MLB; Defensive backs: 35 De'Audre Dix CB/DH; 24 Jeff Hecht S; 25 Greg Laybourn CB/S; 17 Billy Parker DH; 36 Daryl Townsend DH; 45 Paul Woldu CB; 23 Seth Williams CB | Special teams: 37 Martin Bédard LS; 6 Sean Whyte K/P; Reserve list: -- Sandro DeAngelis K; 34 Emmanuel Marc RB; 98 Jermaine McElveen DT/DE; Practice roster: 55 Anthony Barrette T; 50 John Hashem T; 97 Ryan Lucas DT; 26 Micheaux Robinson CB; 32 Rashaud Slaughter RB | Injured list: 99 Daunte Akra DE (1 Game); 33 Dwight Anderson DH (9 Game); 22 Étienne Boulay S (9 Game); 59 Josh Bourke T (9 Game); 39 Jerald Brown DH (9 Game); 1 Tad Crawford S (9 Game); 41 Shea Emry LB (9 Game); 31 Mark Estelle CB (9 Game); 21 Mike Griffin FB (1 Game); 51 Kristian Matte T (9 Game); 15 Josh Neiswander QB (1 Game); 72 Jeff Robertshaw DE (9 Game); 43 John Surla LB (9 Game); 81 Kerry Watkins WR (9 Game); Suspended list: Buster Davis LB; Italics indicate American players |

== Coaching staff ==
2011 Montreal Alouettes staff
| Front office: Owner – Bob Wetenhall; President and ceo – Ray Lalonde; VP, General Manager and Director of Football Operations and Player Personnel – Jim Popp; Assistant general manager – Marcel Desjardins; Football operations assistant/scout – Joey Abrams; Football operations assistant/scout – Uzooma Okeke; Head coaches: Head coach – Marc Trestman; Offensive coaches: Offensive Coordinator, Quarterbacks & Assistant Head Coach – Scott Milanovich; Running Backs & Assistant Offensive Line – Andy Bischoff; Receivers – Marcus Brady; Offensive line – Jonathan Himebauch | Defensive coaches: Defensive Coordinator & Linebackers – Tim Tibesar; Defensive line – Mike Sinclair; Defensive backs – Daronte Jones; Defensive assistant – Jean-Marc Edme; Special teams coaches: Special teams coordinator – Andy Bischoff; Special teams assistant – Carson Walch; → Coaching staff |

== Awards and records ==
=== Milestones ===
On July 15, 2011, quarterback Anthony Calvillo became the CFL's all-time passing touchdown leader with a first-quarter touchdown, passing Damon Allen's previous mark of 394 with his 395th touchdown pass, against Allen's former team, the Toronto Argonauts. The pass was completed to receiver Éric Deslauriers, who recorded his first touchdown reception since 2007.

On October 10, 2011, quarterback Anthony Calvillo became pro footballs all-time passing leader with a 50-yard touchdown pass to Jamel Richardson, also against the Toronto Argonauts.

== Playoffs ==
=== Schedule ===
| Game | Date | Time | Opponent | Venue | Score | Result | Attendance |
|---|---|---|---|---|---|---|---|
| East Semi-Final | Nov 13 | 1:00 PM EST | Hamilton Tiger-Cats | Olympic Stadium | 52–44 (OT) | Loss | 33,051 |

# Games played with colour uniforms.

=== Bracket ===
November 13: Division Semi-Finals
East
E3 | Hamilton Tiger-Cats | 52*
E2 | Montreal Alouettes | 44
West
W3 | Calgary Stampeders | 19
W2 | Edmonton Eskimos | 33

November 20: Division Finals
E3 | Hamilton Tiger-Cats | 3
E1 | Winnipeg Blue Bombers | 19
W2 | Edmonton Eskimos | 23
W1 | BC Lions | 40

November 27: 99th Grey Cup; BC Place Stadium – Vancouver
E1 | Winnipeg Blue Bombers | 23
W1 | BC Lions | 34

*-Team won in Overtime.

=== East Semi-Final ===
Hamilton at Montreal

| Team | 1 | 2 | 3 | 4 | OT | Total |
|---|---|---|---|---|---|---|
| • Tiger-Cats | 10 | 14 | 3 | 17 | 8 | 52 |
| Alouettes | 3 | 13 | 7 | 21 | 0 | 44 |

- Date: November 13
- Location: Olympic Stadium
  Montreal, QC
- Game start: 1:00 PM EST
- Game attendance: 33,051
- TV announcers (TSN): Chris Cuthbert (Play by Play), Glen Suitor (Colour)
