= 2011 Toronto Argonauts season =

CFL team season

- General manager: Jim Barker
- Head coach: Jim Barker
- Home stadium: Rogers Centre

Results
- Record: 6–12
- Division place: 4th, East
- Playoffs: did not qualify
- Team MOP: Chad Owens
- Team MOC: Ricky Foley
- Team MOR: Chad Kackert

Uniform

The 2011 Toronto Argonauts season was the 54th season for the team in the Canadian Football League (CFL) and their 139th season overall. The Argonauts were eliminated from playoff contention on October 10, 2011 and failed to make a second straight playoff appearance, finishing fourth place in the East Division with a 6–12 record.

== Offseason ==
=== CFL draft ===
The 2011 CFL draft took place on Sunday, May 8, 2011. After trading their first round pick to Winnipeg for Steven Jyles, the Argonauts went into draft day without that pick. However, thanks to a trade with the Roughriders, Toronto selected offensive lineman Tyler Holmes with the seventh overall pick, by only giving up a second and a fourth pick. Overall, the Argonauts had seven selections in the draft.

Round	Pick	Player	Position	School/Club team
1	7	Tyler Holmes	OL	Tulsa
3	18	Djems Kouame	WR	Montréal
3	22	Zander Robinson	DL	Western Ontario
4	28	Jedd Gardner	WR	Guelph
5	35	Gregory Alexandre	DL	Montréal
5	38	Julian Feoli Gudino	WR	Laval
6	43	Michael Knill	OL	Wilfrid Laurier

== Preseason ==
Week	Date	Opponent	Location	Final Score	Attendance	Record
A	June 18	Tiger-Cats	Rogers Centre	W 31 – 12	12,851	1–0
B	June 23	@ Blue Bombers	Canad Inns Stadium	W 30 – 23	29,117	2–0

== Regular season ==
=== Season standings ===
East Division
Team	GP	W	L	T	PF	PA	Pts	
Winnipeg Blue Bombers	18	10	8	0	432	432	20	Details
Montreal Alouettes	18	10	8	0	515	468	20	Details
Hamilton Tiger-Cats	18	8	10	0	481	478	16	Details
Toronto Argonauts	18	6	12	0	397	498	12	Details

=== Season schedule ===
Win Loss Tie

Week	Date	Opponent	Location	Final Score	Attendance	Record
1	July 1	@ Stampeders	McMahon Stadium	W 23 – 21	27,984	1–0
2	July 8	@ Blue Bombers	Canad Inns Stadium	L 22 – 16	27,638	1–1
3	July 15	@ Alouettes	Molson Stadium	L 40 – 17	24,698	1–2
4	July 23	Blue Bombers	Rogers Centre	L 33 – 24	21,189	1–3
5	July 29	@ Eskimos	Commonwealth Stadium	L 26 – 25	32,478	1–4
6	August 4	Alouettes	Rogers Centre	L 36 – 23	19,204	1–5
7	August 13	@ Tiger-Cats	Ivor Wynne Stadium	L 37 – 32	24,347	1–6
8	August 18	Roughriders	Rogers Centre	W 24 – 18	20,482	2–6
9	Bye					2–6
10	September 2	Lions	Rogers Centre	L 29 – 16	19,593	2–7
11	September 10	@ Lions	Empire Field	L 28 – 6	25,263	2–8
12	September 17	@ Roughriders	Mosaic Stadium	L 30 – 20	30,048	2–9
13	September 24	Blue Bombers	Rogers Centre	W 25 – 24	19,108	3–9
14	October 1	Tiger-Cats	Rogers Centre	L 27 – 12	21,853	3–10
15	October 10	@ Alouettes	Molson Stadium	L 29 – 19	23,960	3–11
16	October 14	Stampeders	Rogers Centre	W 31 – 29	18,720	4–11
17	October 21	Eskimos	Rogers Centre	L 31 – 24	19,176	4–12
18	October 28	@ Blue Bombers	Canad Inns Stadium	W 27 – 22	29,751	5–12
19	November 3	Tiger-Cats	Rogers Centre	W 33 – 16	20,833	6–12

== Roster ==
2011 Toronto Argonauts final roster
Quarterbacks: 12 Dalton Bell; 6 B. J. Hall; Running backs: 3 Cory Boyd; 40 Bryan Crawford; 33 Jeff Johnson; Receivers: 87 DJ Boldin; 88 Mike Bradwell; 80 Jeremaine Copeland; 32 Andre Durie; 86 Maurice Mann; 2 Chad Owens; 82 Chad Rempel LS; 89 Spencer Watt	Offensive linemen: 62 Edawn Coughman T; 59 Joe Eppele G/T; 61 Cedric Gagné-Marcoux G; 67 Jeff Keeping G; 64 Dominic Picard C; 68 Zachary Pollari T; 66 Jonathan St-Pierre C; Defensive linemen: 96 Alex Buzbee DE; 99 Ronald Flemons DE; 95 Ricky Foley DE; 97 Zander Robinson DE; 92 Taylor Scott DT; 97 Claude Wroten DT	Linebackers: 51 Tristan Black; 20 Nick Clement; 46 Jason Pottinger; 38 Jasper Simmons; 37 Jeremy Unertl; 26 Jordan Younger; Defensive backs: 39 Matt Black CB; 30 Wes Lysack S; 24 Evan McCollough DH; 23 Armando Murillo DH; 28 Byron Parker CB; 10 Willie Pile S; 21 Lin-J Shell DH; 25 Sean Smalls CB	Special teams: 7 Noel Prefontaine K/P; 13 Grant Shaw K/P; Reserve roster: 44 Chad Kackert RB; 18 Djems Kouamé WR; 16 Brandon Rideau WR; Practice roster: 75 Gregory Alexandre DT; 63 Jacob Bender G/T; 4 Theo Scott QB	Injured list: 81 Demario Ballard SB (9 Game); 45 Anthony Cannon LB (9 Game); 35 Kevin Eiben LB (9 Game); 94 Kevin Huntley DT (9 Game); 91 Ben Ishola DE (9 Game); 9 Steven Jyles QB (9 Game); 5 E. J. Kuale LB (9 Game); 27 Javes Lewis LB (9 Game); 56 Rob Murphy T (9 Game); 65 Taylor Robertson G (9 Game); 29 Chris Smith LB (9 Game); 84 Samuel Tranks WR (9 Game); 54 Chris Van Zeyl T (9 Game); Italics indicates American player Roster updated 2026-05-12; Depth Chart; Transactions (argonauts.ca); Transactions (cfl.ca)

== Coaching staff ==
2011 Toronto Argonauts staff
Front office: Owner – David Braley; President and ceo – Bob Nicholson; Vice-Chair – Michael Clemons; General manager – Jim Barker; Assistant general manager and football operations – Ian Sanderson; Director of player personnel – Mike Hagen; Football operations consultant – Nick Volpe; Head coaches: Head coach – Jim Barker; Offensive coaches: Offensive coordinator and quarterbacks – Jaime Elizondo; Receivers – Cos DeMatteo; Offensive line – Stephen McAdoo	Defensive coaches: Defensive coordinator and secondary – Orlondo Steinauer; Defensive line – George Dyer; Linebackers – Greg Quick; Special teams coaches: Special teams coordinator – Mike O'Shea; → Coaching staff
