= 2011 Calgary Stampeders season =

Canadian football team season

- General manager: John Hufnagel
- President: Lyle Bauer
- Head coach: John Hufnagel
- Home stadium: McMahon Stadium

Results
- Record: 11–7
- Division place: 3rd, West
- Playoffs: Lost West Semi-Final
- Team MOP: Nik Lewis
- Team MOC: Jon Cornish
- Team MOR: Demetrice Morley

Uniform

The 2011 Calgary Stampeders season was the 54th season for the team in the Canadian Football League (CFL) and their 73rd overall. The Stampeders finished in third place in the West Division with an 11–7 record and lost the West Semi-Final game to the Edmonton Eskimos.

== Offseason ==
=== CFL draft ===
The 2011 CFL draft took place on Sunday, May 8, 2011. The Stampeders had six selections in the draft, with the first coming in the third spot overall, after trading their sixth overall pick to the BC Lions. Through the trade, Calgary was able to select local star receiver Anthony Parker with their first pick, who was ranked as the number one receiver available in the draft. The Stampeders also selected Ottawa Quarterback Brad Sinopoli, who had been discussed as the best non-import QB to be available in a long time.

Round	Pick	Player	Position	School/Club team
1	3	Anthony Parker	WR	Calgary
2	9	Junior Turner	DL	Bishop's
4	26	Akwasi Antwi	DL	Mount Allison
4	29	Brad Sinopoli	QB	Ottawa
5	34	Matt Walter	RB	Calgary
6	45	Jared Manchulenko	TE	Concordia

== Preseason ==
Week	Date	Opponent	Score	Result	Attendance	Record
A	Wed, June 15	vs. BC Lions	24–0	Loss	8,235	0–1
B	Fri, June 24	at Edmonton Eskimos	37–22	Win	32,796	1–1

== Regular season ==
=== Season standings ===
West Division
Team	GP	W	L	T	PF	PA	Pts	
BC Lions	18	11	7	0	511	385	22	Details
Edmonton Eskimos	18	11	7	0	427	401	22	Details
Calgary Stampeders	18	11	7	0	511	476	22	Details
Saskatchewan Roughriders	18	5	13	0	346	482	10	Details

=== Season schedule ===
The September 25 game against the Hamilton Tiger-Cats was played in Moncton, New Brunswick as a part of the Touchdown Atlantic series.

Week	Date	Opponent	Score	Result	Attendance	Record
1	Fri, July 1	vs. Toronto Argonauts	23–21	Loss	27,428	0–1
2	Fri, July 8	at BC Lions	34–32	Win	22,738	1–1
3	Thur, July 14	at Winnipeg Blue Bombers	21–20	Win	27,890	2–1
4	Sat, July 23	vs. Edmonton Eskimos	24–19	Loss	29,910	2–2
5	Sat, July 30	at Saskatchewan Roughriders	22–18	Win	30,048	3–2
6	Sat, Aug 6	vs. Hamilton Tiger-Cats	32–20	Win	29,307	4–2
7	Fri, Aug 12	at Saskatchewan Roughriders	45–35	Win	30,048	5–2
8	Bye					5–2
9	Sat, Aug 27	vs. Montreal Alouettes	38–31	Win	30,386	6–2
10	Mon, Sept 5	vs. Edmonton Eskimos	35–7	Loss	35,650	6–3
11	Fri, Sept 9	at Edmonton Eskimos	30–20	Win	45,672	7–3
12	Sat, Sept 17	vs. BC Lions	32–19	Loss	29,929	7–4
13	Sun, Sept 25	at Hamilton Tiger-Cats	55–36	Loss	20,153	7–5
14	Sat, Oct 1	vs. Saskatchewan Roughriders	40–3	Win	33,469	8–5
15	Sat, Oct 8	at BC Lions	33–31	Loss	30,622	8–6
16	Fri, Oct 14	at Toronto Argonauts	31–29	Loss	18,720	8–7
17	Fri, Oct 21	vs. Saskatchewan Roughriders	25–13	Win	29,698	9–7
18	Sun, Oct 30	at Montreal Alouettes	32–27	Win	24,051	10–7
19	Sat, Nov 5	vs. Winnipeg Blue Bombers	30–24	Win	29,076	11–7

== Roster ==
2011 Calgary Stampeders final roster
Quarterbacks: 1 Henry Burris; 15 Brad Sinopoli; 4 Drew Tate; Running backs: 41 LaMarcus Coker; 9 Jon Cornish; 26 Rob Cote; 21 Lyle Green; Receivers: 23 Jabari Arthur; 83 Romby Bryant; 80 Johnny Forzani; 87 Arjei Franklin; 82 Nik Lewis; 85 Ken-Yon Rambo; 3 Larry Taylor	Offensive linemen: 62 Stanley Bryant T; 63 Jon Gott G/C; 53 Ed Harrison T; 66 Tim O'Neill C; 67 Dimitri Tsoumpas G; 50 Spencer Wilson G/T; Defensive linemen: 94 Brian Bulcke DT; 95 DeVone Claybrooks DT; 39 Charleston Hughes DE; 90 Chris McCoy DE; 44 Justin Phillips DE; 23 Junior Turner DT	Linebackers: 47 Akwasi Antwi; 37 Marc Calixte; 11 Malik Jackson; 45 Karl McCartney; 46 Robert McCune; 12 Juwan Simpson; 8 Daren Stone; Defensive backs: 38 Quincy Butler; 27 Johnnie Dixon; 7 Eric Fraser; 30 Brandon Isaac; 31 Demetrice Morley; 25 Keon Raymond; 28 Brandon Smith; 29 Geoff Tisdale	Special teams: 56 Randy Chevrier LS; 16 Burke Dales P; 30 René Paredes K; Reserve roster: 86 Anthony Parker WR; 84 Landan Talley SB; 60 Tony Washington T; Practice Roster: 0 Taurean Allen DB; 96 Demonte' Bolden DT; 48 Justin Conn LB; 91 Kevin Dixon DE; 88 Marquay McDaniel WR; 61 Joe McGrath T; 17 Cam Sexton QB; 34 Brent Vinson DB; 49 Sean Ware LB	Injured list: 69 John Bender T; 98 Torrey Davis DT; 64 J'Michael Deane G/DT; 33 Greg Fassitt DB; 99 Corey Mace DT; 6 Rob Maver K; 59 Steve Myddelton G; 21 Joffrey Reynolds RB; 35 Tim St. Pierre FB; Suspended: Curtis Vizza OL; Lindsey Witten DE; Italics indicate American player Roster updated 2026-04-30

=== Coaching staff ===
2011 Calgary Stampeders staff
Front office: President and coo – Lyle Bauer; General manager – John Hufnagel; Director of player personnel – John Murphy; Director of football operations – Michael Petrie; Director of football administration – Jane Mawby; Player personnel and football operations assistant director – Chris Jones; Head coaches: Head coach – John Hufnagel; Offensive coaches: Offensive coordinator – Dave Dickenson; Running backs – Mike Gibson; Receivers – Pete Costanza; Offensive line – Kris Sweet	Defensive coaches: Defensive coordinator – Chris Jones; Defensive line – Cornell Brown; Linebackers – Brent Monson; Defensive backs – Tony Missick; Special teams coaches: Special teams coordinator – Mark Kilam; Strength and conditioning: Strength and conditioning trainer – Brent Monson; → Coaching staff

== Playoffs ==
=== Schedule ===
Game	Date	Time	Opponent	Score	Result	Attendance
West Semi-Final	Nov 13	2:30 PM MST	at Edmonton Eskimos	33–19	Loss	30,183

=== Bracket ===
November 13: Division Semi-Finals
East
E3	Hamilton Tiger-Cats	52*
E2	Montreal Alouettes	44
West
W3	Calgary Stampeders	19
W2	Edmonton Eskimos	33

November 20: Division Finals
E3	Hamilton Tiger-Cats	3
E1	Winnipeg Blue Bombers	19
W2	Edmonton Eskimos	23
W1	BC Lions	40

November 27: 99th Grey Cup; BC Place Stadium – Vancouver
E1	Winnipeg Blue Bombers	23
W1	BC Lions	34

*-Team won in Overtime.

=== West Semi-Final ===
Calgary at Edmonton

Team	1	2	3	4	Total
Stampeders	8	1	6	4	19
• Eskimos	3	22	1	7	33

- Date: November 13
- Location: Commonwealth Stadium
  Edmonton, AB
- Game start: 2:30 PM MST
- Game attendance: 30,183
- TV announcers (TSN): Rod Black (Play by Play), Duane Forde (Colour)
