= Hugh O'Neill (Canadian football) =

Canadian gridiron football player (born 1990)

Profile
- Positions: Punter, Placekicker

Personal information
- Born: January 20, 1990 (age 36); Edmonton, Alberta, Canada
- Listed height: 6 ft 2 in (1.88 m)
- Listed weight: 185 lb (84 kg)

Career information
- High school: Ross Sheppard
- University: Alberta Golden Bears
- CFL draft: 2011: 2nd round, 11th overall pick

Career history
- 2011–2013: BC Lions
- 2013–2014: Edmonton Eskimos
- 2015: Saskatchewan Roughriders*
- 2015: Hamilton Tiger-Cats
- 2017–2021: Edmonton Eskimos / Elks
- * Offseason or practice squad member only
- Stats at CFL.ca

Hugh O'Neill (born January 20, 1990) is a Canadian former professional football punter and placekicker who played in the Canadian Football League (CFL) for the BC Lions, Edmonton Eskimos / Elks, and Hamilton Tiger-Cats. He was selected by the Lions with the 11th overall pick of the 2011 CFL draft. He was also a member of the Saskatchewan Roughriders but did not play for them.

== University career ==
O'Neill played CIS football with the Alberta Golden Bears.

== Professional career ==
=== BC Lions ===
In the Canadian Football League's Amateur Scouting Bureau final rankings, O'Neill was ranked as the eighth best player for players eligible in the 2011 draft, and fifth by players in Canadian Interuniversity Sport. O'Neill was drafted in the second round and 11th overall by the BC Lions in the 2011 CFL draft and was signed by the team on May 30, 2011. His first two years with the BC Lions were spent on the injured list, a conventional way in the CFL to hide players from the salary cap while keeping the player protected from poaching by other teams. In his third year (2013 season) the team restructured the contract of the incumbent Paul McCallum so that O'Neill and McCallum could share the role. In the first exhibition game of that season in Calgary, he kicked five field goals, including a 47-yard attempt in the driving rain that went in off the crossbar to win the game with less than a minute left. He played the second exhibition game as well when McCallum picked up a last-minute injury in the pregame warm up, but got no field attempts in that game. McCallum's injury was serious enough to keep him out of the first regular season game, so on June 28, 2013, O'Neill suited up for his first regular season game. On August 16, 2013, entering Week 8 of the 2013 CFL season, the Lions released O'Neill due to a contract dispute.

=== Edmonton Eskimos (first stint) ===
On August 19, 2013, he was signed by his hometown Edmonton Eskimos. On August 24, 2013, he was assigned to do the field goal kicking, with incumbent Grant Shaw handling the punting and kickoffs. O'Neill was good on his first attempt as an Eskimo, from 46 yards out, and on his second, a 42-yarder in the fourth quarter. Including that game, he was the Eskimos' placekicker for seven games in the 2013 season, making 11 of 16 field goal attempts. He returned to the Eskimos in 2014, but remained off the game day roster to begin the season as Shaw had won all three kicking duties. Following an injury to Shaw in the Labour Day Classic on September 1, 2014, O'Neill took over placekicking, punting, and kickoffs for the rest of the season, playing in eight regular season games and both Eskimos' playoff games. He connected on 20 of 26 field goal attempts while averaging 44.4 yards-per-punt. The Eskimos released O'Neill on January 21, 2015.

=== Saskatchewan Roughriders ===
O'Neill signed with the Saskatchewan Roughriders on February 3, 2015. He was released June 20, 2015 after the final pre-season game against Calgary on June 19, 2015.

=== Hamilton Tiger-Cats ===
O'Neill signed a practice roster agreement with the Hamilton Tiger-Cats on June 30, 2015. He played in his first game as a Tiger-Cat on July 2, 2015, recording two punts for a 38.5 yard average. He played in eight games for the team where he punted 37 times for a 42.9-yard average. He became a free agent on February 9, 2016.

=== Edmonton Eskimos / Elks (second stint) ===
After not playing in 2016, O'Neill signed with the Eskimos on July 24, 2017, to serve as a back-up kicker behind Sean Whyte. His signing proved prudent as Whyte was injured in the next game and O'Neill was activated for the August 4, 2017 game against the Tiger-Cats where he was 2-for-2 on field goal attempts, 3-for-4 on extra-point attempts, and had four points for an average of 49.0 yards. The Eskimos then signed Christopher Milo on September 2, 2017, to handle the placekicking while O'Neill remained the team's punter. O'Neill played in 13 regular season game and both of the team's post-season games as he averaged 45.1 yards on 73 punts in the regular season and had 12 punts for a 45.6-yard average in the post-season.

In 2018, O'Neill played in all 18 regular season games for the first time in his professional career where he was the team's punter as Whyte returned from injury as the team's placekicker. This season, he had a career-high 107 punts for a career-best 45.2-yard average. He played in 12 regular season games in 2019 where he had 80 punts for an average of 45.1 yards per punt.

With the 2020 CFL season cancelled, he did not play in 2020, but signed a contract extension with Edmonton on February 5, 2021. He played in all 14 regular season games in a shortened 2021 season where he punted 98 times for a 42.4-yard average. He released in the following off-season on January 27, 2022.
