= Michael Carter (Canadian football) =

Canadian football player (born 1986)

Profile
- Position: Defensive back

Personal information
- Born: April 28, 1986 (age 40); Windsor, Ontario, Canada
- Listed height: 5 ft 10 in (1.78 m)
- Listed weight: 180 lb (82 kg)

Career information
- College: Maryland
- CFL draft: 2011: 3rd round, 19th overall pick

Career history
- 2011: BC Lions*
- 2011: Hamilton Tiger-Cats
- 2012–2014: Montreal Alouettes
- 2015: Saskatchewan Roughriders
- 2015: Edmonton Eskimos*
- 2016: Toronto Argonauts
- 2017: Montreal Alouettes
- * Offseason or practice squad member only

Awards and highlights
- Grey Cup champion (2015)
- Stats at CFL.ca

Michael Carter (born April 28, 1986) is a Canadian former professional football defensive back. He played in seven seasons in the Canadian Football League (CFL).

== College career ==
Carter played college football for the Maryland Terrapins.

== Professional career ==
Carter was drafted 19th overall by the BC Lions in the 2011 CFL draft, but was released after training camp. He subsequently signed with the Hamilton Tiger-Cats on June 27, 2011. Carter was released near the end of the 2011 CFL season on October 26, 2011. It was announced that Carter had signed with the Montreal Alouettes on January 27, 2011. After a three-year stint with the Alouettes, he signed with the Saskatchewan Roughriders on February 25, 2015. He played for half a season for the Roughriders prior to being released on August 15, 2015. On September 15, 2015, Carter signed with the Edmonton Eskimos as a free agent and was added to their practice roster. He was later released by the Eskimos on November 30, 2015. On August 17, 2016, Carter was signed by the Toronto Argonauts. After one season with the Argonauts, he signed with the Montreal Alouettes. He was released by the Alouettes on May 2, 2018.
