= Paul Swiston =

Canadian football player (born 1989)

Profile
- Position: Offensive lineman

Personal information
- Born: May 26, 1989 (age 37); Calgary, Alberta, Canada
- Listed height: 6 ft 9 in (2.06 m)
- Listed weight: 342 lb (155 kg)

Career information
- University: Calgary
- CFL draft: 2011: 4th round, 24th overall pick

Career history
- 2011–2014: Winnipeg Blue Bombers
- 2015: Calgary Stampeders
- Stats at CFL.ca

Paul Swiston (born May 26, 1989) is a Canadian former professional football offensive lineman. In the CFL’s Amateur Scouting Bureau final rankings, he was ranked as the 15th best player for players eligible in the 2011 CFL draft, and 10th by players in the CIS. Swiston was selected in the 4th round, 24th overall by the Winnipeg Blue Bombers and was signed to a contract on May 27, 2011. He was released by the Blue Bombers on October 24, 2014. Swiston signed with the Stampeders on February 17, 2015. He played CIS football with the Calgary Dinos.
