= Marco Iannuzzi =

Canadian football player (born 1987)

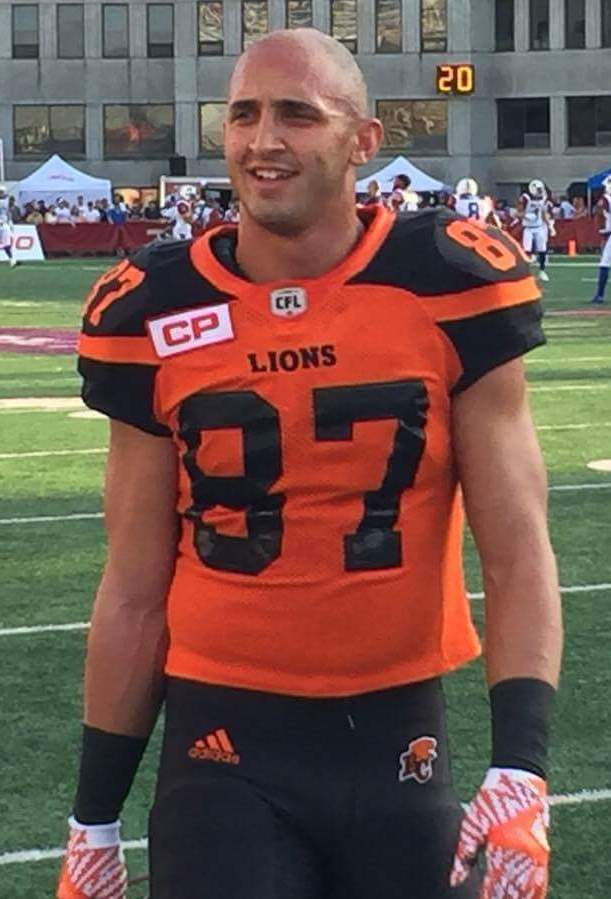
- Iannuzzi in Montreal 2016

No. 87
- Positions: Wide receiver, Kick returner, Punt returner

Personal information
- Born: May 21, 1987 (age 39); Calgary, Alberta, Canada
- Listed height: 6 ft 1 in (1.85 m)
- Listed weight: 196 lb (89 kg)

Career information
- High school: St. Francis High School
- University: Harvard
- CFL draft: 2011: 1st round, 6th overall pick

Career history
- 2011–2017: BC Lions

Awards and highlights
- Grey Cup champion (2011); Tom Pate Memorial Award (2016); Sovereign's Medal for Volunteers (2018)
- Stats at CFL.ca

Marco Iannuzzi (born May 21, 1987) is a retired Canadian football wide receiver for the BC Lions of the Canadian Football League (CFL). He is an official Canadian honour recipient of the Sovereign's Medal for Volunteers presented by the Governor General of Canada and is also a Harvard graduate.

== Education ==
Iannuzzi attended Harvard and the Massachusetts Institute of Technology where he spent his first two years as an economics concentrator while pursuing pre-medical requirements and the following two years of his degree studying engineering, architecture, and environmental science.

== High School football ==
2003-2004: Iannuzzi attended Saint Francis High School (Calgary) where he was unanimous All-Calgary selection, and helped the football team to a 29-game winning streak spanning three seasons, and was MVP of the high school all-star game. Iannuzzi and St. Francis teammate Rolly Lumbala both went on to play professionally together for the BC Lions

== Junior football ==
2005: Iannuzzi played for the Edmonton Huskies of the Canadian Junior Football League where he earned all-conference honours as a receiver and returner. Tied for the all-time longest return, 120 yards, touchdown, October 23, 2005. Most return yards in a single game, 290, Aug, 21, 2005 (7ret).

== Prep School ==
2006: Iannuzzi attended Western Reserve Academy.

== College football ==
2007: Earned rare playing time for a freshman wide receiver, appearing in five games while also returning kickoffs. Caught passes against Penn and Yale. Averaged 20 yards on five kickoff returns and had 34 yards on eight punt returns. Major H recipient.

2008: Started the first two games as a wide receiver before suffering a collarbone injury and missing the next seven before returning to play against Yale. Pulled down 11 receptions for 174 yards, including a 68-yard fourth quarter touchdown pass in a 25-24 win over Holy Cross in the season opener. Had three catches for 31 yards against Brown. Caught a 39-yard pass against Yale.

2009: Had 72 all-purpose yards including a 30-yard reception in a win over Brown on Sept. 25. Had three catches for 22 yards and 29 return yards (one kick, one punt) in a win at Lehigh. Had 175 all-purpose yards against Lafayette. Had 163 all-purpose yards against Penn with 51 receiving yards (3 catches) and 83 kickoff return yards on two attempts.

2010: Iannuzzi averaged 34.5 yards per kickoff return in 2010, making him Harvard's all-time leader in that category. For his career, Iannuzzi averaged 26.5 yards per return, which also places him atop Harvard's all-time list. He is the first player to have two kickoff returns for a touchdown in a single season. Had four catches for 52 yards and a touchdown in the season opener against Holy Cross. Had 194 all-purpose yards at Brown with a 21-yard touchdown catch and a 95-yard kickoff return for a touchdown. Returned two kickoffs for a total of 92 yards with a 50 and a 42-yarder at Lafayette but broke his clavicle in the game. Playing for the first time in 49 days against Yale, Iannuzzi took his first kickoff return 84 yards for a touchdown to start the second half. The run sparked a Harvard team that had trailed throughout the game and paved the way for a 28-21 win. Also caught a 46-yard pass against the Bulldogs. Named national kickoff returner of the week by College Football Performance Awards and the Ivy League Special Teams Player of the Week.

== Professional football ==
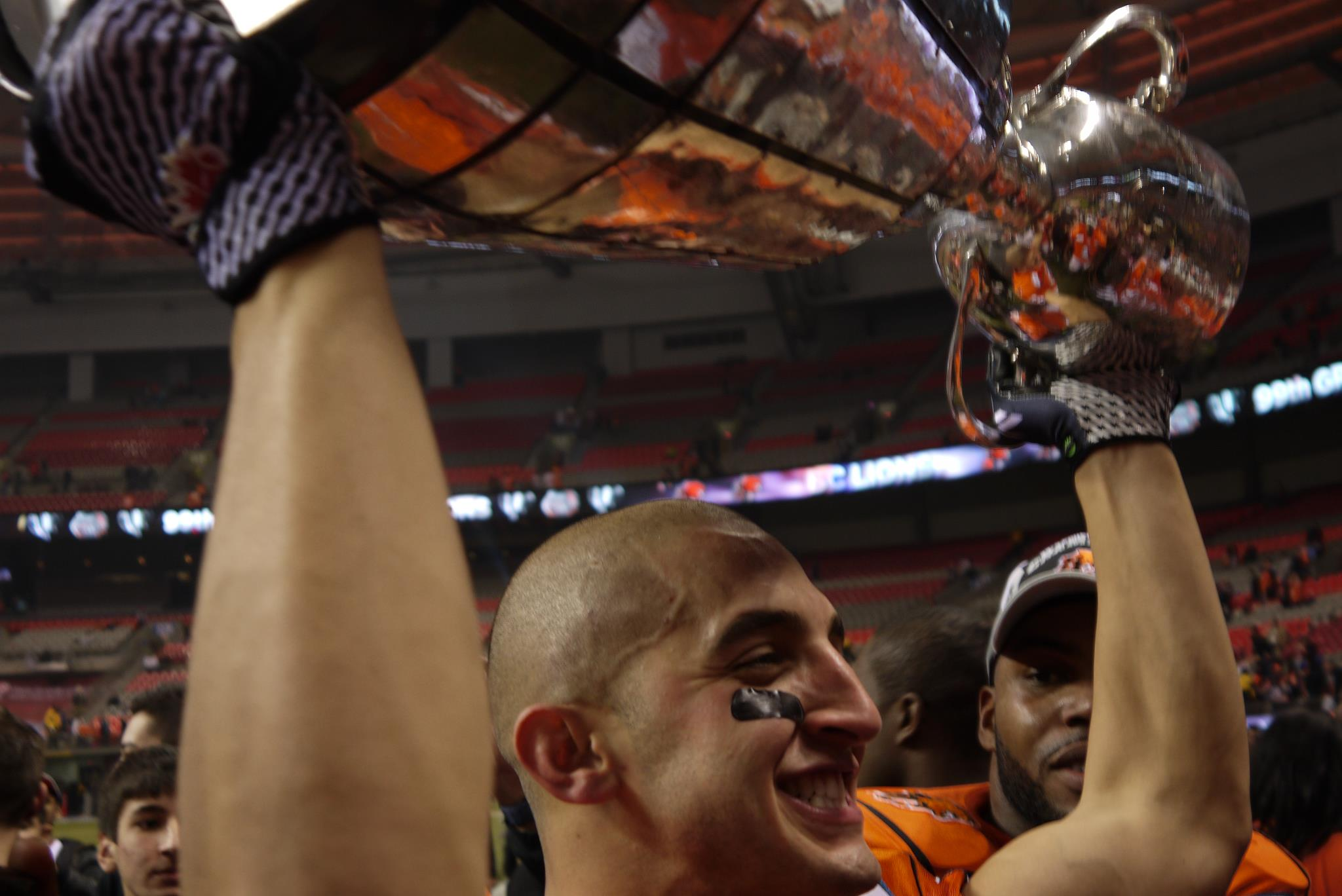
Iannuzzi hoists the 99th Grey Cup

2011: 2011 Grey Cup Champion. Iannuzzi was the Lions' first selection in the 2011 CFL draft. He made his CFL debut in Week 1 and appeared in 15 regular season games where he caught eight passes for 65 yards and added 135 yards on 16 punt returns for an 8.4 yard average.

2012: Iannuzzi had his first two touchdowns against the Saskatchewan Roughriders on October 5. He finished the regular season with 30 receptions for 353 yards and 5 touchdowns.

2013: In his third season with the Lions, Iannuzzi became a regular starter recording 15 starts in 17 appearances as well as the Western Semi-Final. He caught 24 passes for 244 yards and a pair of touchdowns. That game also included his longest gain as a CFL player, a 56-yard completion from Travis Lulay.

2014: Iannuzzi spent the first four games of the year on the injured list before dressing for the 14 remaining games of the year. Notching 11 receptions for 124 yards on the year, Iannuzzi was also called upon to be a regular on special teams where he recorded a career-high 401 yards on 19 kickoff returns and 86 yards on 14 punt returns.

2015: Iannuzzi appeared in all 18 regular season games notching five receptions for 91 yards and a touchdown Iannuzzi recorded 14 punt returns for a career-high 174 yards featuring a 57-yard romp versus Edmonton on Oct 17 as well as 3 kickoff returns for 47 yards.

2016: In 2016, he hauled in 29 catches for a career-high 360 yards. On special teams he had 22 punt returns for 232 yards, both career highs, as well as five kickoff returns for 104 yards. Iannuzzi capped off the season by collecting the CFLPA's Tom Pate Memorial Award, given annually to the player demonstrating sportsmanship and saluting their dedication to community service.

2017: Iannuzzi signed a two-year extension with the Lions through the 2017 and 2018 seasons.

2018: Iannuzzi retired prior to 2018 season, mid-way through two-year (2017/2018) contract.

== Television ==
Iannuzzi competed on CBC Television's reality television series Canada's Smartest Person winning Episode 206 - November 8, 2015.

== Philanthropy ==
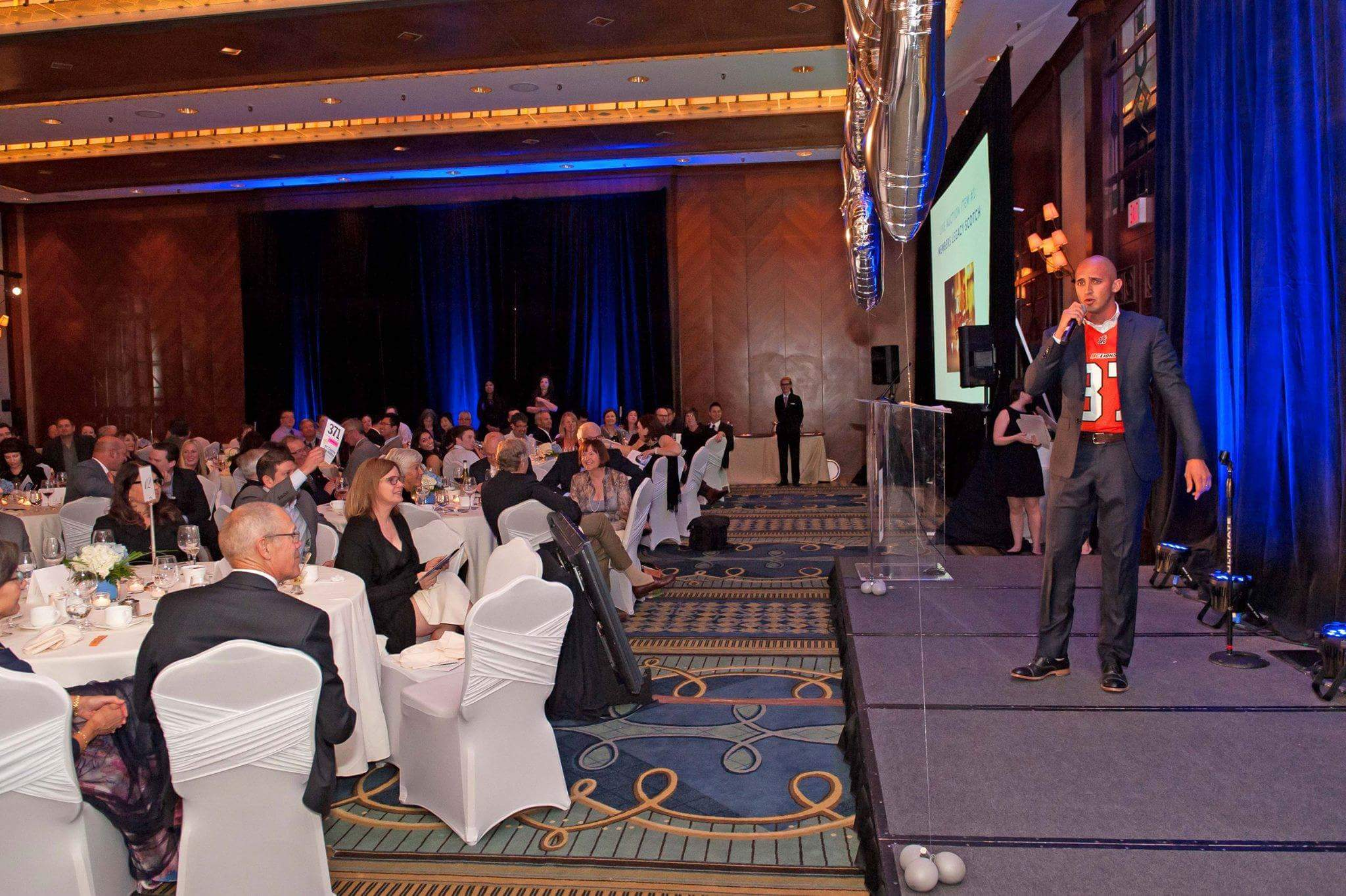
Iannuzzi serving as a live auctioneer for charity

Iannuzzi serves as a chairman, director, board member, master of ceremonies and live auctioneer for various charities and community initiatives. He previously sat as chairman of Ernie Els for Autism Vancouver and a board member of the Multiple Sclerosis Society of Canada, Sources BC, and The Whistler Invitational.
