= Jeff Hecht =

Canadian football player (born 1985)

No. 29
- Position: Defensive back

Personal information
- Born: September 24, 1985 (age 41); Edmonton, Alberta, Canada
- Listed height: 5 ft 10 in (1.78 m)
- Listed weight: 202 lb (92 kg)

Career information
- College: Saint Mary's
- CFL draft: 2011: undrafted

Career history
- 2011: Montreal Alouettes
- 2012–2016: Calgary Stampeders
- 2016–2017: Saskatchewan Roughriders
- 2018–2019: Winnipeg Blue Bombers

Awards and highlights
- 2× Grey Cup champion (2014, 2019)
- Stats at CFL.ca

Jeff Hecht (born September 24, 1985) is a Canadian former professional football defensive back. He was originally signed as an undrafted free agent on May 26, 2011 by the Montreal Alouettes following the 2011 CFL draft. He played CIS Football with the Saint Mary's Huskies.

== Professional career ==
=== Montreal Alouettes ===
Hecht was signed as an undrafted free agent on May 26, 2011 by the Montreal Alouettes following the 2011 CFL draft. He played in all 18 games for the Alouettes, recording 31 defensive tackles and one interception. Despite a strong rookie season, he was released by the Alouettes on May 10, 2012.

=== Calgary Stampeders ===
On June 25, 2012, he was signed by the Calgary Stampeders. He played in parts of five seasons for the Stampeders.

=== Saskatchewan Roughriders ===
Hecht was traded to the Saskatchewan Roughriders on August 16, 2016. Following the 2016 season, he was not signed by the Riders and became a free agent on February 14, 2017. After about a month as a free agent Hecht re-signed with the Roughriders on March 8, 2017. He played in all 18 regular season games for the Riders in 2017, contributing 21 tackles on defense, and 11 on special teams. Hecht was released by the Riders on April 24, 2018.

=== Winnipeg Blue Bombers ===
On July 11, 2018, it was announced that Hecht had agreed to a practice roster agreement with the Winnipeg Blue Bombers.
