= Kyle Exume =

Canadian football player (born 1987)

No. 35
- Position: Running back

Personal information
- Born: November 22, 1987 (age 38); Whitby, Ontario, Canada
- Listed height: 5 ft 10 in (1.78 m)
- Listed weight: 200 lb (91 kg)

Career information
- University: Bishop's
- CFL draft: 2011: 6th round, 40th overall pick

Career history
- 2011: Saskatchewan Roughriders*
- 2011: Hamilton Tiger-Cats
- 2013: Edmonton Eskimos*
- * Offseason or practice squad member only
- Stats at CFL.ca

Kyle Exume (born November 22, 1987) is a Canadian former professional football running back who played in the Canadian Football League (CFL). He was drafted 40th overall by the Saskatchewan Roughriders in the 2011 CFL draft, but was released after training camp. He subsequently signed with the Hamilton Tiger-Cats on June 27, 2011. He played CIS football for the Bishop's Gaiters.
