= Gregory Alexandre =

Canadian football player (born 1985)

Profile
- Position: Defensive tackle

Personal information
- Born: May 31, 1985 (age 41); Montreal, Quebec, Canada
- Listed height: 6 ft 2 in (1.88 m)
- Listed weight: 275 lb (125 kg)

Career information
- University: Montréal
- CFL draft: 2011: 5th round, 35th overall pick

Career history
- 2011: Toronto Argonauts
- 2013–2016: Edmonton Eskimos
- 2016: Saskatchewan Roughriders

Awards and highlights
- Grey Cup champion (2015)
- Stats at CFL.ca

Gregory Alexandre (born May 31, 1985) is a Canadian former professional football defensive lineman. He was drafted 35th overall by the Toronto Argonauts in the 2011 CFL draft and signed with the team on his birthday, May 31, 2011. He played college football for the Montreal Carabins.

He was released by the Argonauts on June 20, 2012. Alexander agreed to terms with the Eskimos on May 13, 2013.

He now works in College de Montreal for the High School team of tackle football les Lions.
