= Philip Blake =

Canadian gridiron football player (born 1985)

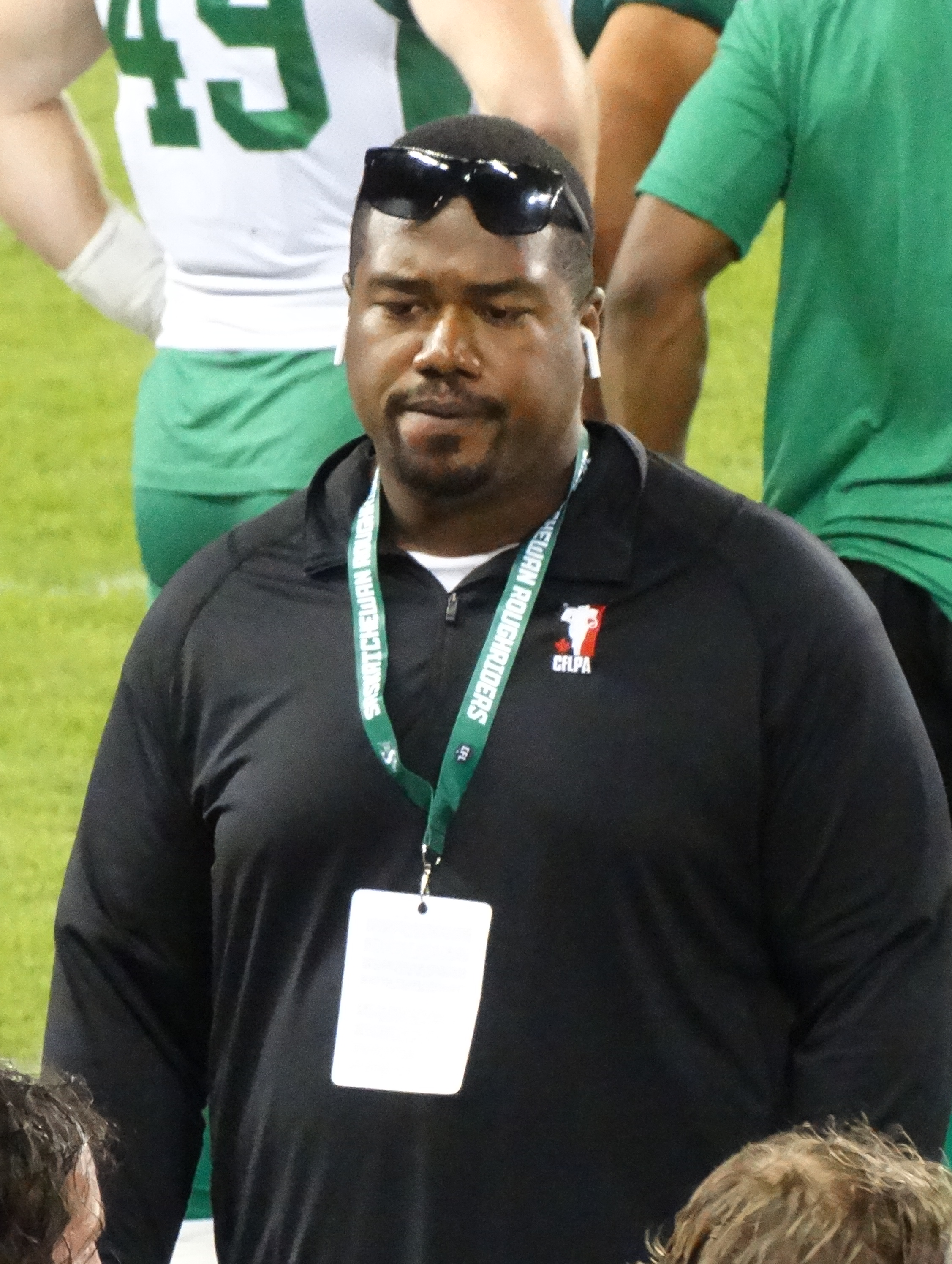
- Blake with the Saskatchewan Roughriders in 2024

Profile
- Position: Offensive lineman

Personal information
- Born: November 27, 1985 (age 40); Toronto, Ontario, Canada
- Listed height: 6 ft 2 in (1.88 m)
- Listed weight: 311 lb (141 kg)

Career information
- College: Baylor
- NFL draft: 2012: 4th round, 108th overall pick
- CFL draft: 2011: 3rd round, 23rd overall pick

Career history
- Denver Broncos (2012); Arizona Cardinals (2013–2014)*; Montreal Alouettes (2015–2018); Saskatchewan Roughriders (2018–2019); Toronto Argonauts (2020–2022); Saskatchewan Roughriders (2023–2024)
- * Offseason or practice squad member only

Awards and highlights
- Grey Cup champion (2022); All-Big 12 First-team (2011)

Career CFL statistics
- Games played: 96
- Games started: 95
- Stats at CFL.ca
- Stats at Pro Football Reference

Philip Anthony Blake (born November 27, 1985) is a Canadian professional football offensive lineman. He played college football for the Baylor Bears. He has also been a member of the Denver Broncos, Arizona Cardinals, Montreal Alouettes, Saskatchewan Roughriders, and Toronto Argonauts.

== College career ==
Blake attended Tyler Junior College in 2008. Prior to 2009, he transferred to Baylor University. In his three years at Baylor, he started all 38 games at either center or right tackle. As a senior, he was an All-Big 12 selection.

== Professional career ==
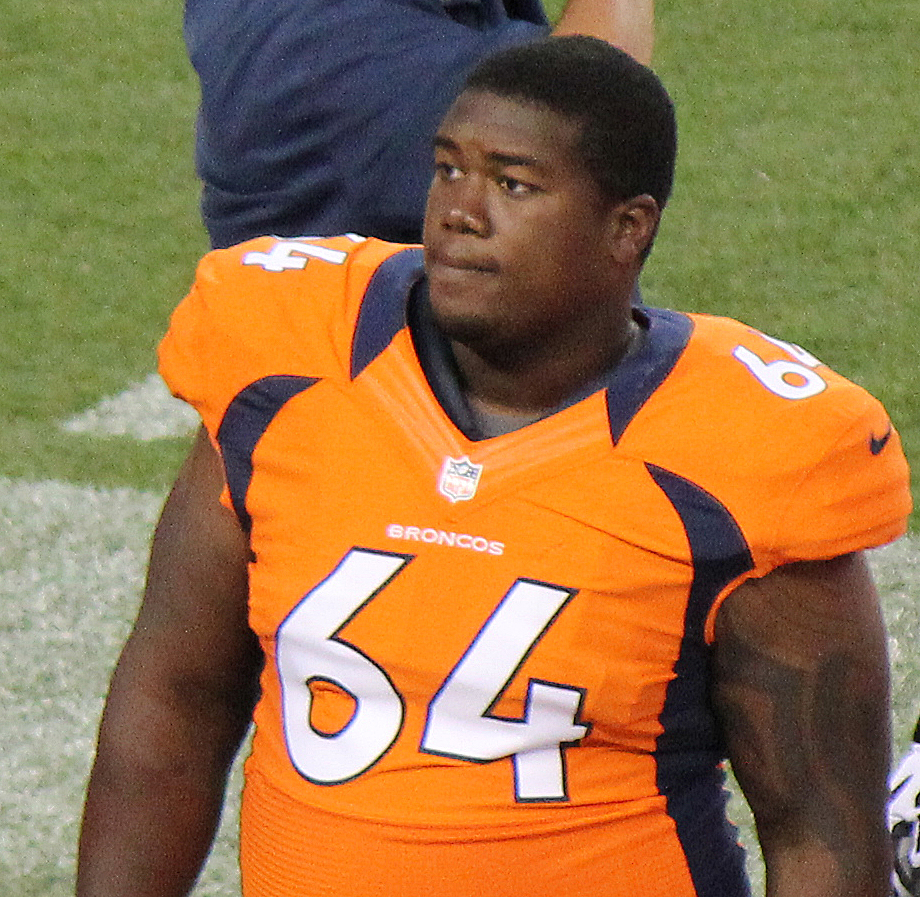
Blake with the Denver Broncos in 2012

He was selected by the Montreal Alouettes in the 2011 CFL draft, but decided to return to Baylor. He later was drafted in the fourth round of the 2012 NFL draft by the Denver Broncos with the pick they received from the New York Jets in exchange for Tim Tebow.

=== Denver Broncos ===
After being drafted by the Denver Broncos in the fourth round of the 2012 NFL draft, Blake signed with the team on June 1, 2012. He never dressed for a regular season game with the team and was released on August 31, 2013.

=== Arizona Cardinals ===
On September 2, 2013, the Arizona Cardinals signed Blake to their practice squad. The Cardinals released Blake on August 30, 2014.

=== Montreal Alouettes ===
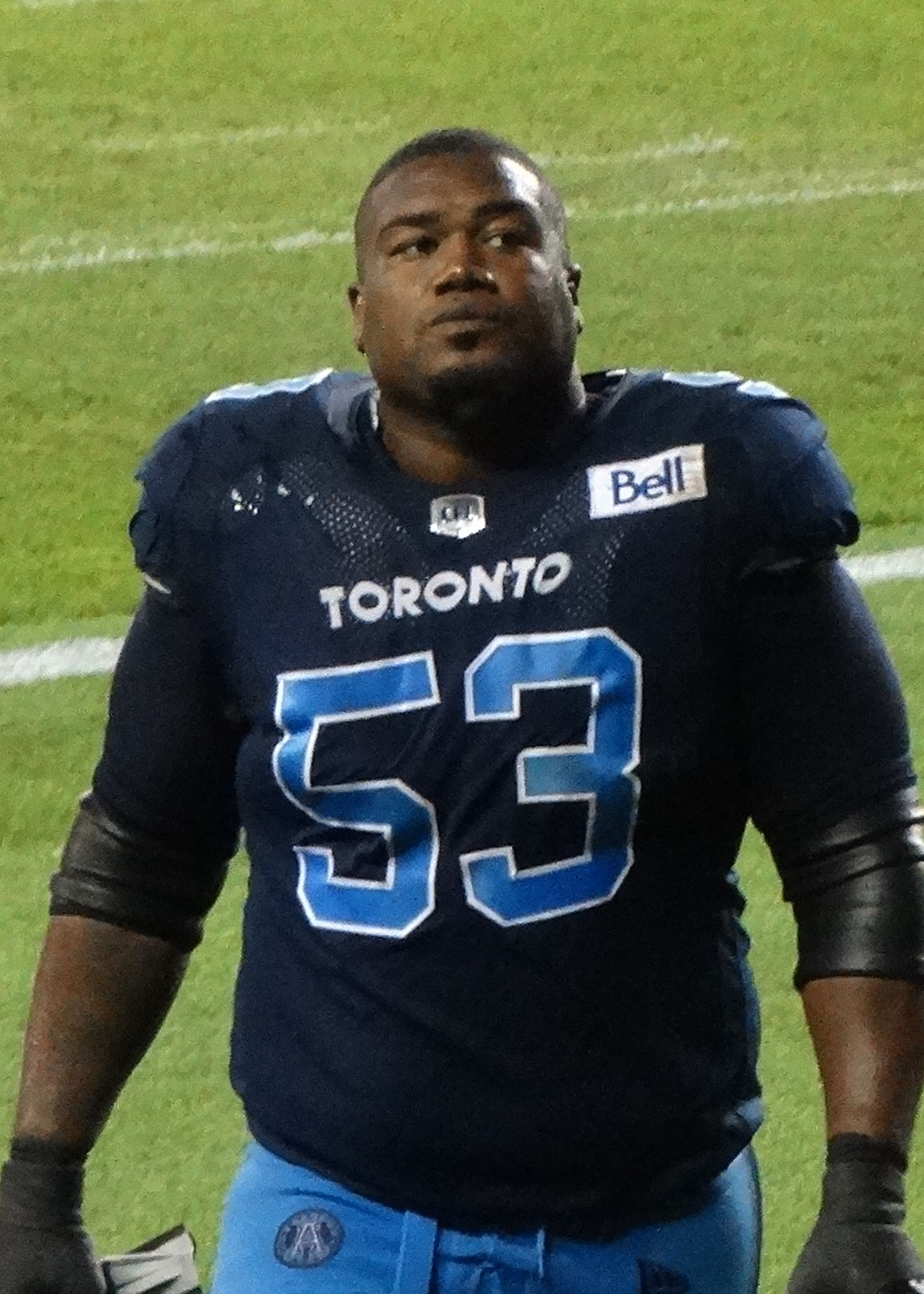
Blake with the Toronto Argonauts in 2021

After spending the 2014 season out of football, Blake signed a three-year contract with the Montreal Alouettes on January 8, 2015.

=== Saskatchewan Roughriders (first stint) ===
On October 10, 2018, Blake was traded alongside teammate Patrick Lavoie to the Saskatchewan Roughriders in exchange for wide receiver Joshua Stanford and a second-round selection in the 2020 CFL draft.

=== Toronto Argonauts ===
On February 11, 2020, Blake signed with the Toronto Argonauts. However, he did not play in 2020 due to the cancellation of the 2020 CFL season and he re-structured his contract with the Argonauts on January 31, 2021. Blake played in 11 games for the Argonauts in 2021 and also played in the team's East Final loss to the Hamilton Tiger-Cats that year. In 2022, he played and started in 17 regular season games and made the shift to left tackle late in the season as the team endured injuries. Blake started at left tackle in the 109th Grey Cup game and won his first Grey Cup championship as the Argonauts defeated the Winnipeg Blue Bombers 24–23. He became a free agent upon the expiry of his contract on February 14, 2023.

=== Saskatchewan Roughriders (second stint) ===
On February 14, 2023, it was announced that Blake had signed with the Roughriders.

On January 25, 2024, the Roughriders announced that Blake had signed a one-year contract extension with the team.

On February 11, 2025, he became a free agent.
