= Renaldo Sagesse =

Canadian football player (born 1986)

No. 96
- Position: Defensive lineman

Personal information
- Born: December 23, 1986 (age 39); Montreal, Quebec
- Listed height: 6 ft 4 in (1.93 m)
- Listed weight: 289 lb (131 kg)

Career information
- University: Michigan
- CFL draft: 2011: 4th round, 25th overall pick

Career history
- 2011: Montreal Alouettes*
- 2012: Saskatchewan Roughriders*
- * Offseason or practice squad member only
- Stats at CFL.ca

Renaldo Sagesse (born December 23, 1986; surname means wisdom in French) is a Canadian football former defensive lineman. He most recently played for the Saskatchewan Roughriders of the Canadian Football League. In the Canadian Football League’s Amateur Scouting Bureau December rankings, he was ranked as the ninth best player for players eligible in the 2011 CFL draft. On May 8, 2011 Sagesse was selected 25th overall in the draft by the Alouettes and signed a contract with the team on May 26, 2011. He was later released at the end of training camp. On May 31, 2012, Sagesse signed with the Saskatchewan Roughriders, but was released during training camp on June 17, 2012.

He played college football with the Michigan Wolverines.

He worked as a supervisor at Collège Notre-Dame and left the position in December 2016. He is now working as the head coach of the Spartiate of CÉGEP Du Vieux-Montréal.
