= Anthony Barrette =

Canadian football player (born 1986)

No. 57
- Position: Offensive lineman

Personal information
- Born: April 22, 1986 (age 40); Verdun, Quebec, Canada
- Listed height: 6 ft 5 in (1.96 m)
- Listed weight: 320 lb (145 kg)

Career information
- University: Concordia University
- CFL draft: 2011: 2nd round, 16th overall pick

Career history
- 2011–2013: Montreal Alouettes
- 2014: Ottawa Redblacks*
- * Offseason or practice squad member only
- Stats at CFL.ca (archive)

Anthony Barrette (born April 22, 1986) is a Canadian former professional football offensive lineman who played in the Canadian Football League (CFL). In the CFL's Amateur Scouting Bureau final rankings, he was ranked as the 13th best player for players eligible in the 2011 CFL draft, and eighth by players in the Canadian Interuniversity Sport (CIS). He was drafted 16th overall by the Montreal Alouettes in the 2011 Draft and signed a contract with the team on May 26, 2011. He spent parts of three seasons with the Alouettes before signing with the Ottawa Redblacks on January 2, 2014. He played CIS football with the Concordia Stingers. Barrette retired in May 2014.
