= Matt Walter =

Canadian football player (born 1989)

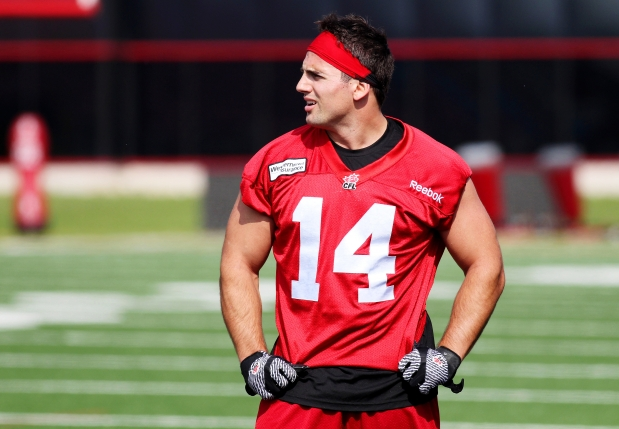
- Walter with the Calgary Stampeders in 2014

No. 14
- Position: Running back

Personal information
- Born: July 20, 1989 (age 37)
- Listed height: 5 ft 10 in (1.78 m)
- Listed weight: 217 lb (98 kg)

Career information
- High school: Bishop O'Byrne
- University: Calgary
- CFL draft: 2011: 5th round, 34th overall pick

Career history
- 2011: Calgary Stampeders*
- 2012–2015: Calgary Stampeders
- 2016: Saskatchewan Roughriders
- * Offseason or practice squad member only

Awards and highlights
- Grey Cup champion (2014)
- Stats at CFL.ca

Matt Walter
Medal record

Men's American football

Representing Canada

World Championship
Silver medal – second place	2011 Austria	Team competition

Matthew John Walter (born July 20, 1989) is a Canadian former professional football running back who played five seasons in the Canadian Football League (CFL) with the Calgary Stampeders and Saskatchewan Roughriders. He was drafted 34th overall by the Stampeders in the 2011 CFL draft and was originally signed by the team on May 26, 2011. He played CIS football for the Calgary Dinos.

== University career ==
In the 2008 CIS football season, Walter was the Canada West nominee for the Hec Crighton Trophy after taking over as the starting running back from Anthony Woodson who was injured.

After attending the Stampeders 2011 training camp, Walter returned to the University of Calgary and the Dinos football team for his final year of college. Walter also starred for Team Canada at the 2011 IFAF World Championships in Vienna, Austria where he earned All-Tournament honors after scoring six touchdowns in three games.

Upon completing his CIS football career in 2011, Walter remained the University of Calgary's All-Time leading rusher and touchdown scorer (all-purpose and rushing). Walter was the Canada West nominee for the Hec Crighton Trophy for the most outstanding player in CIS Football in 2008 and in 2007, the Canada West Rookie of the Year. Walter was a 2 Time All-Canadian and 3 Time Canada West All-Star.

== Professional career ==
Walter was drafted 34th overall by the Calgary Stampeders in the 2011 CFL draft and was signed by the team on May 26, 2011. He attended training camp with the Stampeders before returning to the University of Calgary finish his final year of college.

On December 6, 2011, it was reported that Walter had re-signed with the Stampeders and on March 26, 2012, it was made official by the club.

On July 1, 2012, Walter made his regular season CFL Debut with the Calgary Stampeders. In his first three seasons in the CFL Walter saw his rushing carries increase from 27, to 49 to 79 in 2014. His rushing yards also increased each season, starting at 191 in his rookie season, climbing to 243 in 2013 and then 453 yards in the 2014 season. Following the 2014 CFL season Walter re-signed with Calgary Stampeders.

On February 26, 2016, Walter was released by the Stampeders. Less than a month later, on March 23, 2016, Walter was signed by the Saskatchewan Roughriders. Following the 2016 season he was released by the Roughriders, having appeared in 6 games for the club as a result of injury. Walter retired shortly after the end of the 2016 season.

== Personal life ==
Walter is currently active within the Oil & Gas industry in Calgary after graduating from the Petroleum Land Management Program at the University of Calgary's Haskayne School of Business.
