= Maurice Forbes =

Canadian football player (born 1987)

No. 99
- Position: Defensive tackle

Personal information
- Born: September 9, 1987 (age 39); Toronto, Ontario, Canada
- Listed height: 6 ft 3 in (1.91 m)
- Listed weight: 300 lb (136 kg)

Career information
- College: Concordia
- CFL draft: 2011: 2nd round, 13th overall pick

Career history
- 2011: Hamilton Tiger-Cats
- Stats at CFL.ca (archive)

Maurice Forbes (born September 9, 1987) is a Canadian former professional football defensive tackle for the Hamilton Tiger-Cats of the Canadian Football League. He was drafted 13th overall by the Tiger-Cats in the 2011 CFL draft and signed with the team on June 1, 2011. He played CIS football for the Concordia Stingers.
