= Carson Walch =

American football coach and administrator (born 1978)

New Mexico Lobos
- Title: Passing game coordinator & WR

Personal information
- Born: March 6, 1978 (age 48); Milwaukee, Wisconsin, U.S.

Career information
- High school: Elgin-Millville (Elgin, Minnesota)
- College: Winona State

Career history

Coaching
- Winona State (2000–2002) Passing game coordinator & wide-receivers; Dakota State (2003–2005) Offensive coordinator, quarterbacks & wide-receivers; St. Thomas (2006) Special teams coordinator & running backs coach; Winona State (2007–2009) Assistant head coach, offensive coordinator & wide-receivers; Montreal Alouettes (2010) Offensive & special teams assistant; Montreal Alouettes (2011) Offensive & special teams assistant; Montreal Alouettes (2012) Wide-receivers; Chicago Bears (2013–2014) Assistant wide-receivers & offensive quality control; Minnesota (2015) Offensive passing game consultant; Edmonton Eskimos (2016) Passing game coordinator & wide-receivers; Edmonton Eskimos (2017) Offensive coordinator & wide-receivers; Philadelphia Eagles (2018) Assistant wide-receivers; Philadelphia Eagles (2019) Wide-receivers; Minnesota (2020) Offensive passing game consultant; New Mexico (2026–present) Passing game coordinator & wide-receivers

Operations
- Cleveland Browns (2021–2026) Director of player development

Awards and highlights
- Grey Cup champion (2010)

Carson Walch (born March 6, 1978) is an American football coach who is currently the <Passing game coordinator & wide-receivers coach for the New Mexico Lobos in the Mountain West Conference (MWC).

== Coaching career ==
Walch began his coaching career at his alma mater Winona State in 2000 as their wide receivers coach and passing game coordinator. He was later the offensive coordinator at Dakota State and the special teams coordinator/RBs at St. Thomas before returning to Winona State as their assistant head coach and offensive coordinator.

=== Montreal Alouettes ===
Walch was hired as an offensive & special teams assistant for the Montreal Alouettes in 2010, winning his first Grey Cup championship when the Alouettes won the 98th Grey Cup 21–18. He added offensive assistant duties in 2011, and was eventually promoted to receivers coach in 2012 under Alouettes head coach Marc Trestman.

=== Chicago Bears ===
Walch was named a quality control & asst. receivers coach for the Chicago Bears in 2013, joining Trestman, who was named head coach of the Bears earlier. Walch worked with two pro-bowl receivers in Brandon Marshall & Alshon Jeffery.

=== Minnesota ===
Walch spent 2015 as an offensive pass game consultant at Minnesota.

=== Edmonton Eskimos ===
Walch was hired to be the receivers coach and passing game coordinator for the Edmonton Eskimos in 2016, and was promoted to offensive coordinator in 2017. As the play-caller, the Eskimos led the CFL in twenty offensive categories.

=== Philadelphia Eagles ===
Walch was hired as the assistant wide receivers coach for the Philadelphia Eagles in 2018, and was promoted to wide receivers coach in 2019. Walch worked with Alshon Jeffery, Desean Jackson, Nelson Agholor, and Mack Hollins.

== Front office career ==
=== Cleveland Browns ===
Walch was hired to be the player development coordinator for the Cleveland Browns in 2021. He was then promoted in 2023 to director of offensive skill development.
