= Josh Maveety =

Canadian football player (born 1988)

No. 6
- Positions: Punter, Kicker

Personal information
- Born: November 29, 1988 (age 37); Kingston, Ontario, Canada
- Listed height: 6 ft 2 in (1.88 m)
- Listed weight: 210 lb (95 kg)

Career information
- College: Bishop's
- CFL draft: 2009: undrafted

Career history
- 2011: Hamilton Tiger-Cats*
- * Offseason or practice squad member only
- Stats at CFL.ca (archive)

Josh Maveety (born November 29, 1988) is a Canadian former professional football punter and placekicker for the Hamilton Tiger-Cats of the Canadian Football League. After finishing his CIS eligibility with the Bishop's Gaiters, he signed as an undrafted free agent with the Tiger-Cats on June 20, 2011.
