= Jedd Gardner =

Canadian football player (born 1988)

No. 89
- Positions: Wide receiver, Kick returner

Personal information
- Born: July 22, 1988 (age 38); Niagara Falls, Ontario, Canada
- Listed height: 5 ft 11 in (1.80 m)
- Listed weight: 185 lb (84 kg)

Career information
- High school: St. Micheal's High School
- University: Guelph
- CFL draft: 2011: 4th round, 28th overall pick

Career history
- 2011: Toronto Argonauts*
- 2012: Toronto Argonauts*
- * Offseason or practice squad member only

Awards and highlights
- 4x OUA ALL-STAR WR; OUA ALL-STAR KR; CIS ALL-CANADIAN WR; 2x Guelph MVP; Ted Wildman Award Winner; 4x CIS ACADEMIC ALL-CANADIAN; Top Performer (40x Dash and Broad Jump) at Duane Ford National Invitation Combine (NIC)

Jedd Gardner
Medal record

Men's American football

Representing Canada

World Championship
Silver medal – second place	2011 Austria	Team competition

Jedd Gardner (born July 22, 1988) is a Canadian former football wide receiver for the Guelph Gryphons. He was selected to compete in the East–West bowl and in the 2011 CFL combine. He was drafted 28th overall by the Toronto Argonauts of the Canadian Football League in the 2011 CFL draft and signed with the team on May 31, 2011. After being released following the 2011 training camp, Gardner was sent to play for Team Canada in the IFAF World Cup Tournament and after returned to play out his final year at Guelph. During his college career Gardner posted some impressive numbers 152 receptions for 2,515 yards and 15 touchdowns. He also added 200 rushing yards and 2 touchdowns. In the return game Gardner posted 989 punt returns yards on 17 attempts for an amazing 58.18 yards/return with 4 touchdowns. As a kick returner he tallied 570 yards and 1 touchdown. Gardner also holds the 3 of the longest plays in CIS history at 129 yards, 128 yards, and 125 yards.
