= Samuel Tranks =

American gridiron football player (born 1986)

No. 84
- Position: Wide receiver

Personal information
- Born: December 14, 1986 (age 39); Philadelphia, Pennsylvania, U.S.
- Listed height: 6 ft 0 in (1.83 m)
- Listed weight: 183 lb (83 kg)

Career information
- College: Seton Hill
- NFL draft: 2010: undrafted

Career history
- 2011–2012: Toronto Argonauts

Awards and highlights
- Grey Cup champion (2012)
- Stats at CFL.ca

Samuel Tranks (born December 14, 1986) is an American former professional football wide receiver.who played two seasons with the Toronto Argonauts of the Canadian Football League (CFL).

== College career ==
Tranks played college football for the Seton Hill Griffins for four years where he recorded 136 receptions for 1,896 yards and 18 touchdowns, 55 punt returns for 732 yards and five touchdowns, and 124 kickoff returns for 2,752 yards and two touchdowns.

== Professional career ==
Tranks signed with the Toronto Argonauts on June 1, 2011. After beginning the season on the injured list and then practice roster, he made his debut on July 23, 2011, where he had three receptions for 48 yards and a touchdown. He started in three games for the Argonauts in 2011 where he had seven catches for 71 yards and a touchdown. However, he suffered an Anterior cruciate ligament injury on October 1, 2011, in a game against the Hamilton Tiger-Cats which ended his rookie season. He was released during training camp of the following year on June 20, 2012.

Tranks re-signed with the Argonauts on September 26, 2012. He played in two more games where he had three catches for 27 yards and one touchdown. He was on the practice roster when the team won the 100th Grey Cup and his contract expired following the game.
