= Christopher Milo =

Canadian football player (born 1986)

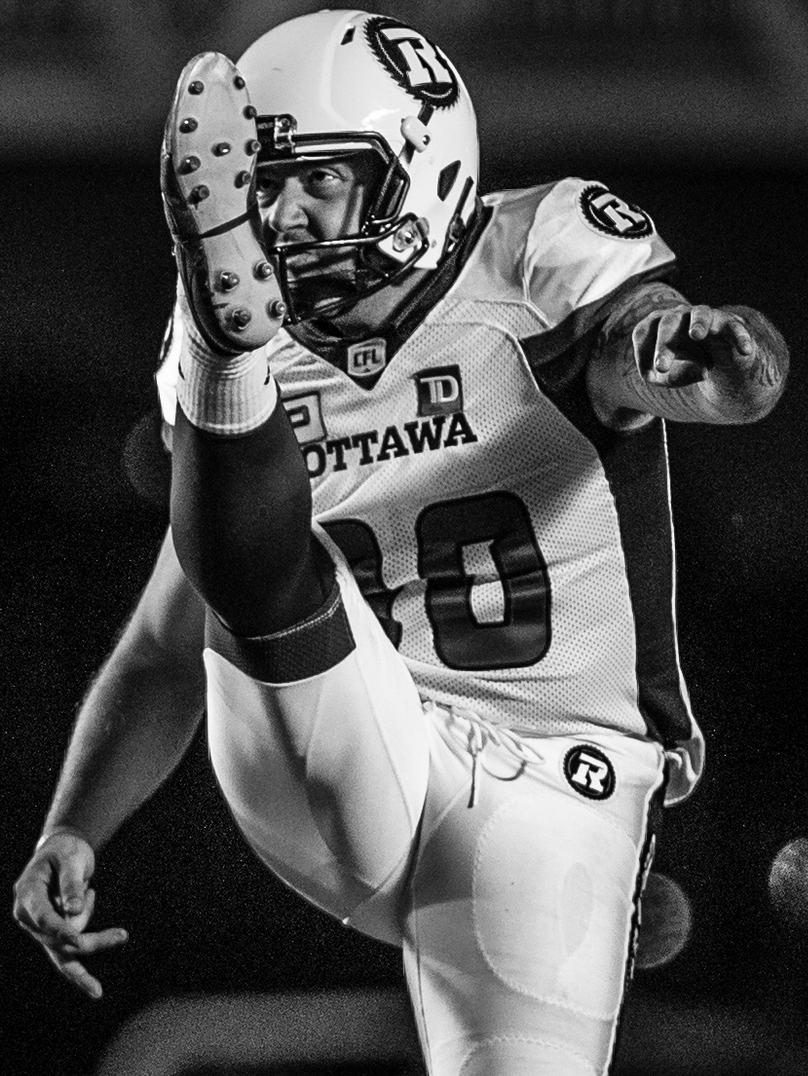
- Milo in 2016

Profile
- Position: Kicker

Personal information
- Born: November 2, 1986 (age 40); Montreal, Quebec, Canada
- Listed height: 5 ft 11 in (1.80 m)
- Listed weight: 205 lb (93 kg)

Career information
- University: Laval
- CFL draft: 2011: 4th round, 30th overall pick

Career history
- 2011–2015: Saskatchewan Roughriders
- 2015–2016: Ottawa Redblacks
- 2017: Edmonton Eskimos

Awards and highlights
- 2× Grey Cup champion (2013, 2016)
- Stats at CFL.ca

Christopher Milo (born November 2, 1986) is a Canadian former professional Canadian football placekicker. He was drafted 30th overall by the Saskatchewan Roughriders in the 2011 CFL draft and signed with the team on June 1, 2011. He played CIS football for the Laval Rouge et Or. During his college career, Milo won the Vanier Cup twice and he has helped the Roughriders and Ottawa Redblacks both win a Grey Cup in the CFL.

== Playing career ==
=== University ===
Spending four seasons with the Laval Rouge et Or, Milo holds a provincial record for the most career points with 385, placing him third in CIS football. Milo is also ranked first in Quebec for field goals, with 69, also placing him third in Canada. In 2008, he set a Canadian record for the most field goals in one season, with 25. Milo was also on the Quebec All-Star team for each of his university seasons. He also earned a spot on the CIS First All-Canadian Team in 2008 and 2010 as well as the Second All-Canadian Team in 2009. Milo participated in the Montreal Alouettes training camp in 2006 and 2007 before entering university. He was on the Junior National Team three times in his career. Milo also has two Vanier Cup championships.

=== Professional ===
Milo was drafted in the 4th round (30th overall) in the 2011 CFL draft by the Saskatchewan Roughriders. In his rookie season, Milo completed 22 of 26 field goal attempts, with 49 yards being his longest while kicking 79 punts for 3410 yards, averaging 43.2 yards per kick. He had 47 kick-offs for 2518 yards. On October 29, 2011, during a game at Mosaic Stadium at Taylor Field, Milo tied the record for the longest punt ever kicked in professional football when he punted the football 108 yards. The football was in the air over 65 yards, but rolled its way into the endzone for a point. After Eddie Johnson was released by the Saskatchewan Roughriders, Milo became the starting kicker for 2012. In 2013, Milo finished the season 46-for-52 with the longest being a 50-yard field goal. On September 5, 2013, Milo was named Special Teams Player of The Month for August 2013. Milo kicked one field goal while helping the Saskatchewan Roughriders win the 101st Grey Cup in Regina on November 24, 2013. On February 11, 2014, Milo was expected to become a free agent but got re-signed by the Roughriders. The Roughriders released Milo on July 6, 2015 following the signing and successful debut of Paul McCallum.

On July 31, 2015, he was signed by the Ottawa Redblacks as their placekicker while their incumbent kicker, Delbert Alvarado, was released the same day. Milo converted 31 out of 34 field goal attempts (91.1% accuracy) for Ottawa during the 2015 season. Following the season, Milo's contract was extended by the Redblacks through the 2017 CFL season. However, he was released by the Redblacks on February 14, 2017.

On September 2, 2017, Milo signed with the Edmonton Eskimos, whom he had recently signed on with as a scout for the RSEQ.

== Personal life ==
Milo and his wife had lived in Ottawa year round. However, in June 2017 it was reported that he was moving back to Quebec City with his family as he continued to look for employment as a place kicker in the CFL. Milo now works as a bus driver for RTC in Quebec City.
