= Brandon Denson =

American gridiron football player (born 1987)

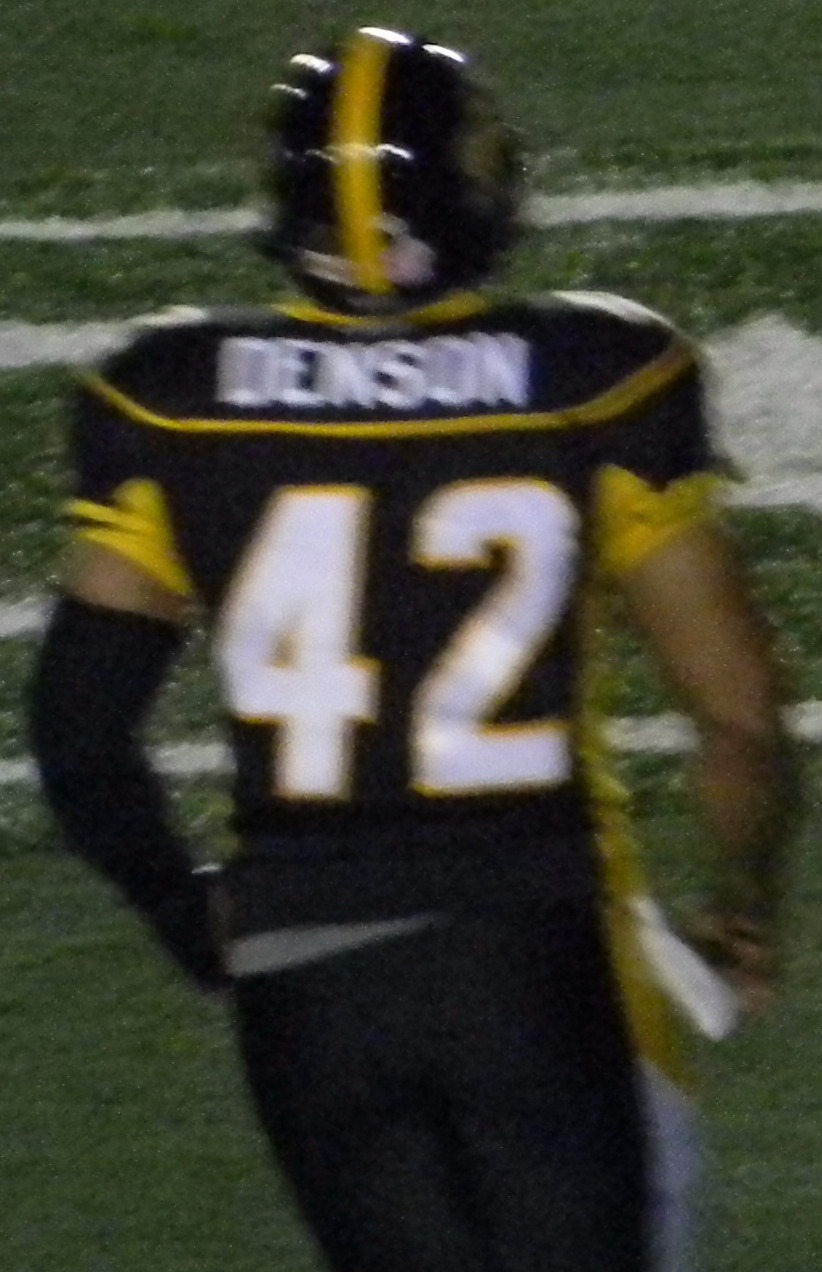
- Denson with the Hamilton Tiger-Cats in 2011

No. 42, 5
- Positions: Linebacker, Defensive end

Personal information
- Born: July 22, 1987 (age 39); Ypsilanti, Michigan, U.S.
- Listed height: 5 ft 11 in (1.80 m)
- Listed weight: 230 lb (104 kg)

Career information
- High school: Willow Run (Ypsilanti)
- College: Michigan State (2005–2009)

Career history
- 2011: Hamilton Tiger-Cats
- 2012–2013: Cleveland Gladiators
- 2013: Montreal Alouettes
- 2014: Ottawa Redblacks*
- * Offseason or practice squad member only
- Stats at CFL.ca (archive)
- Stats at ArenaFan.com

Brandon Denson (born July 22, 1987) is an American former professional football player who played in the Canadian Football League (CFL) and Arena Football League (AFL). He played college football at Michigan State University. He was a member of the Hamilton Tiger-Cats, Montreal Alouettes, and Ottawa Redblacks of the CFL and the Cleveland Gladiators of the AFL.

== Early life ==
Brandon Denson was born on July 22, 1987, in Ypsilanti, Michigan. He played high school football at Willow Run High School in Ypsilanti, where he was a three-year starter at running back and cornerback. He rushed for 750 yards as a senior, including a career-high 210 yards and three touchdowns in the final game of the season. Denson also played basketball at Willow Run, averaging 4.4 points and 8.7 rebounds as a power forward during the 2004–05 season. He was a four-year starting centerfielder for the baseball team and led the team with ten steals his junior year. He garnered all-conference recognition in track his senior season, participating in the 110 hurdles, 300 hurdles, and long jump. Denson was diagnosed with type 1 diabetes his senior year.

== College career ==
Denson joined the Michigan State Spartans of Michigan State University in 2005 as a walk-on. He redshirted the 2005 season as a running back. He was a four-year letterman from 2006 to 2009. He moved to strong safety in 2006. He played in eight games during the 2006 season, mostly on special teams, and posted two tackles while also returning one punt for 20 yards. Denson appeared in all 13 games in 2007, primarily on special teams, and recorded six solo tackles and four assisted tackles. He converted to linebacker in 2008 and played in 12 games, appearing as a Sam linebacker on nickel defense plays and on special teams. That season, he totaled 19 solo tackles, 12 assisted tackles, 1.5 sacks, and three pass breakups. Denson played in 12 games, starting ten at Will linebacker, as a senior in 2009, recording 23 solo tackles, 45 assisted tackles, 2.5 sacks, and one interception. He also missed one game due to injury that year. He majored in criminal justice at Michigan State.

== Professional career ==
Denson dressed in four games, starting one, for the Hamilton Tiger-Cats of the Canadian Football League (CFL) in 2011, totaling five defensive tackles, seven special teams tackles, and one fumble recovery.

Denson tried out for the Carolina Panthers at rookie minicamp in May 2012 but was not signed.

Denson was assigned to the Cleveland Gladiators of the Arena Football League on June 19, 2012. He was placed on injured reserve on July 2. He was assigned to the Gladiators again on November 1. Denson was placed on physically unable to perform on March 10, 2013, and activated the next day. He was placed on the suspended list on April 2, 2013. He posted six solo tackles and six assisted tackles for the Gladiators during the 2013 season. He was placed on reassignment on June 11, 2014.

Denson spent most of the 2013 CFL season on the practice roster of the Montreal Alouettes. However, he did end up dressing for one game, where he did not record any statistics.

Denson signed with the CFL's Ottawa Redblacks in January 2014. On June 10, 2014, it was reported that Denson had been released.

== Post-football career ==
Denson competed in the eighth season of American Ninja Warrior in 2016. He has also spent time as a disciplinarian at Voyageur Academy in Detroit, Michigan.
