= Reed Alexander (Canadian football) =

Canadian football player (born 1987)

No. 65
- Position: Offensive lineman

Personal information
- Born: September 30, 1987 (age 39); Medicine Hat, Alberta, Canada
- Listed height: 6 ft 3 in (1.91 m)
- Listed weight: 292 lb (132 kg)

Career information
- CJFL: Okanagan Sun
- University: Calgary
- CFL draft: 2011: 4th round, 31st overall pick

Career history
- 2012–?: Montreal Alouettes
- Stats at CFL.ca (archive)

Reed Alexander
Medal record

Men's American football

Representing Canada

World Championship
Silver medal – second place	2011 Austria	Team competition

Reed Alexander (born September 30, 1987) is a Canadian former professional football offensive lineman for the Montreal Alouettes of the Canadian Football League (CFL). He was drafted 31st overall by the Alouettes in the 2011 CFL draft, but elected to return to the Calgary Dinos for his fourth year.
