= Zander Robinson =

Canadian football player (born 1989)

No. 34
- Positions: Fullback, Defensive lineman

Personal information
- Born: October 11, 1989 (age 37); Vancouver, British Columbia, Canada
- Listed height: 6 ft 5 in (1.96 m)
- Listed weight: 243 lb (110 kg)

Career information
- University: Western Ontario
- CFL draft: 2011: 3rd round, 22nd overall pick

Career history
- 2011–2015: Toronto Argonauts
- 2016: Edmonton Eskimos*
- * Offseason or practice squad member only

Awards and highlights
- Grey Cup champion (2012)
- Stats at CFL.ca

Alexander "Zander" Robinson (born October 11, 1989) is a professional Canadian football fullback for the Edmonton Eskimos. He was drafted 22nd overall by the Argonauts as a defensive lineman in the 2011 CFL draft and signed with the team on May 31, 2011. He played CIS football for the Western Ontario Mustangs.

In 2012, Robinson was a member of the 100th Grey Cup champion Argonauts team.

In 2013, Robinson was converted from a defensive lineman to his current fullback position. On August 1, 2013, Robinson scored his first CFL touchdown at home against the B.C. Lions. Robinson finished the 2013 season with 117 receiving yards, on 10 catches, with 2 touchdowns. Following the 2013 season Robinson signed a contract extension which plans to keep him with the Argos through the 2015 CFL season.
