= Tyler Holmes =

Canadian gridiron football player (born 1988)

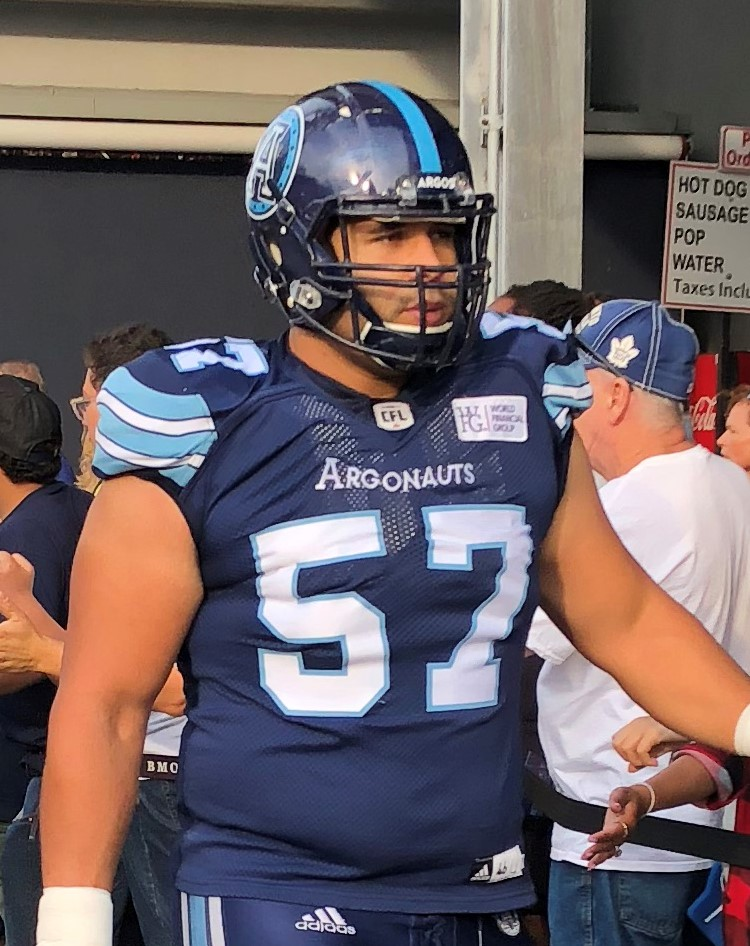
- Holmes with the Toronto Argonauts in 2018

No. 57
- Position: Offensive lineman

Personal information
- Born: July 24, 1988 (age 38); Ottawa, Ontario, Canada
- Listed height: 6 ft 4 in (1.93 m)
- Listed weight: 305 lb (138 kg)

Career information
- College: Tulsa
- CFL draft: 2011: 1st round, 7th overall pick

Career history
- 2012–2013: Minnesota Vikings*
- 2013–2019: Toronto Argonauts
- * Offseason or practice squad member only

Awards and highlights
- 2× CFL East All-Star (2014, 2016)
- Stats at Pro Football Reference
- Stats at CFL.ca

Tyler Holmes (born July 24, 1988) is a Canadian former professional football offensive lineman who played for the Toronto Argonauts of the Canadian Football League (CFL). He played college football for the Tulsa Golden Hurricane.

== Professional career ==
Holmes was drafted by the Argonauts seventh overall in the first round of the 2011 CFL draft, however, after playing out his college eligibility, he played for the Minnesota Vikings of the National Football League for the 2012 season. After he was cut from the Vikings during their 2013 training camp, he signed with the Argonauts on September 17, 2013. He played in 112 regular season games for the Argonauts where he was twice named a CFL East All-Star. Holmes won his first Grey Cup championship as a member of the 105th Grey Cup winning team. As a pending free agent in 2020, he was released during the free agency negotiation window on February 7, 2020.

== Personal life ==
His father, Richard Holmes, also played in the CFL.
