= Junior Turner =

Canadian football player (born 1988)

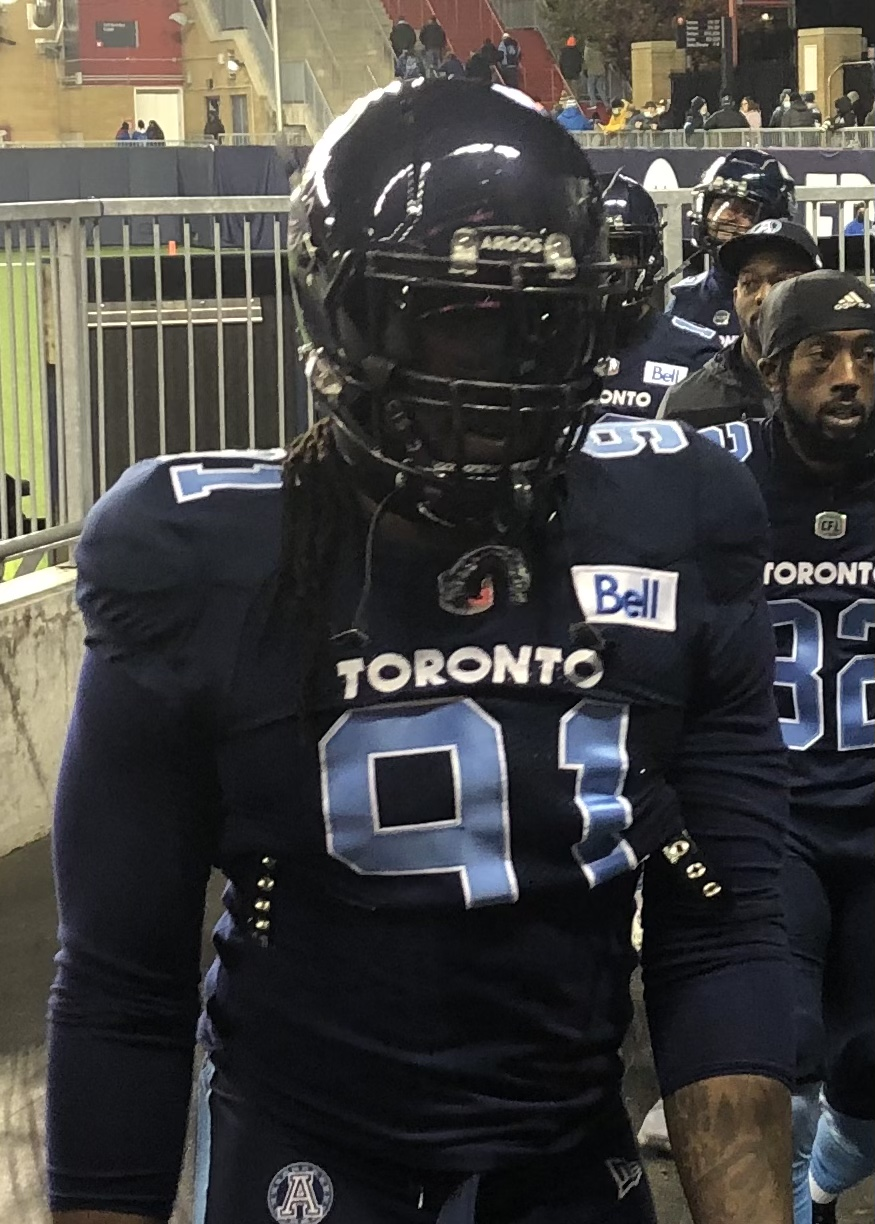
- Turner with the Toronto Argonauts in 2021

No. 7, 91
- Position: Defensive lineman

Personal information
- Born: September 2, 1988 (age 38); Toronto, Ontario, Canada
- Listed height: 6 ft 3 in (1.91 m)
- Listed weight: 255 lb (116 kg)

Career information
- University: Bishop's Gaiters
- CFL draft: 2011: 2nd round, 9th overall pick

Career history
- 2011–2019: Calgary Stampeders
- 2021: Toronto Argonauts

Awards and highlights
- 2× Grey Cup champion (2014, 2018)
- Stats at CFL.ca

Junior Turner (born September 2, 1988) is a Canadian former professional football defensive lineman who played in the Canadian Football League (CFL). He spent the first nine years of his career with the Calgary Stampeders where he won Grey Cup championships in 2014 and 2018. He played CIS football with the Bishop's Gaiters.

== Professional career ==
=== Calgary Stampeders ===
In the CFL’s Amateur Scouting Bureau final rankings, he was ranked as the 12th best player for players eligible in the 2011 CFL draft, and seventh by players in the Canadian Interuniversity Sport (CIS). Turner was drafted ninth overall in the second round of the 2011 CFL Draft by the Calgary Stampeders. He was later signed to a contract with the Stampeders on May 20, 2011. He played in nine seasons for the Stampeders where he played in 106 regular season games and recorded 154 defensive tackles, 17 sacks, and one forced fumble. He was released by the Stampeders on January 29, 2020.

=== Toronto Argonauts ===
On October 6, 2021, Turner signed with the Toronto Argonauts. He played in four regular season games where he had eight defensive tackles and one sack. He became a free agent upon the expiry of his contract on February 8, 2022.
