= Akwasi Antwi =

Canadian football player (born 1985)

No. 45
- Position: Linebacker

Personal information
- Born: May 5, 1985 (age 41); Ghana
- Listed height: 6 ft 0 in (1.83 m)
- Listed weight: 250 lb (113 kg)

Career information
- University: Mount Allison University
- CFL draft: 2011: 4th round, 26th overall pick

Career history
- 2011–2012: Calgary Stampeders
- 2013: Toronto Argonauts
- 2014: BC Lions
- 2015: Saskatchewan Roughriders
- 2015: Toronto Argonauts
- Stats at CFL.ca (archive)

Akwasi Antwi (born May 9, 1985) is a former professional Canadian football linebacker. He was selected 26th overall by the Calgary Stampeders in the 2011 CFL draft. Antwi played CIS football with the Mount Allison Mounties.

== Professional career ==
=== Calgary Stampeders ===
Antwi was drafted 26th overall (fourth round) by the Calgary Stampeders in the 2011 CFL draft. He signed with the team on May 25, 2011. He spent two seasons with the Stamps amassing 28 special teams tackles and six regular tackles.

=== Toronto Argonauts ===
On April 8, 2013, Antwi was traded to the Toronto Argonauts in exchange for the rights to offensive tackle Daniel Federkeil. He was released by the Argonauts on July 25, 2013.

=== BC Lions ===
Antwi was signed as a free agent by the BC Lions on February 27, 2014. He was released by the Lions on May 14, 2015.

=== Toronto Argonauts ===
Antwi was signed as a free agent by the Toronto Argonauts on August 6, when he was added to the team's practice roster. Antwi was activated to the active roster on August 8, when he saw his first action with the Argonauts against the Saskatchewan Roughriders.
