= Anthony Parker (Canadian football) =

Canadian football player (born 1989)

No. 86
- Position: Wide receiver

Personal information
- Born: November 21, 1989 (age 36); Vancouver, British Columbia, Canada
- Listed height: 6 ft 1 in (1.85 m)
- Listed weight: 210 lb (95 kg)

Career information
- High school: Foothills Composite High School
- University: Calgary
- CFL draft: 2011: 1st round, 3rd overall pick

Career history
- 2011–2017: Calgary Stampeders
- 2018: BC Lions
- 2019–2020: Edmonton Eskimos

Awards and highlights
- Grey Cup champion (2014)
- Stats at CFL.ca

Anthony Lawrence Parker (born November 21, 1989) is a Canadian former professional football wide receiver. He was selected by the Calgary Stampeders and played with that organization for seven years, winning a Grey Cup championship in 2014. He played CIS football for the Calgary Dinos.

== University career ==
Parker played for the Calgary Dinos from 2007 to 2010, being named a Canada West All-Star twice and a CIS Second Team All-Canadian in 2009. In the CFL's Amateur Scouting Bureau final rankings, he was ranked as the second best player for players eligible in the 2011 CFL draft, and first by players in the CIS. On December 17, 2010, it was announced that Parker was one of two CIS players to be named to the East–West Shrine Game.

== Professional career ==
=== Calgary Stampeders ===
Parker was selected third overall in the first round of the 2011 CFL draft by the Calgary Stampeders after Calgary traded up to be in a position to draft him. He was later signed to a contract with the Stampeders on May 20, 2011. He earned a spot on the active roster and dressed in his first game on July 1, 2011, against the Toronto Argonauts. Parker recorded his first reception on August 6, 2011, against the Hamilton Tiger-Cats. He also recorded his first interception against the BC Lions on September 17, 2011, while on special teams defending a fake-punt play. His first touchdown came two years later after he caught a pass from Bo Levi Mitchell on July 26, 2013, against the Winnipeg Blue Bombers. He won his first Grey Cup championship game in 2014 as a member of the Stampeders' winning team. Overall, he played in 108 games for the Stampeders until he was released following 2018 training camp on June 10, 2018. Over his career with Calgary, he recorded 178 catches for 2245 receiving yards and 15 receiving touchdowns, 35 carries for 326 rushing yards and one rushing touchdown, 13 punt returns for 121 yards, 21 kickoff returns for 425 yards, and nine special teams tackles.

=== BC Lions ===
On September 1, 2018, Parker signed with the BC Lions to their practice roster and was added to the active roster on September 6, 2018. In 9 games, Parker caught 7 passes for 99 yards, and was also used as a returner; in week 18 against Calgary, Parker's 79-yard punt return nearly scored a touchdown against his former team, but came up just short.

=== Edmonton Eskimos ===
Early in free agency for 2019, Parker signed with the Edmonton Eskimos alongside a large number of other players in a remake of the roster. Despite being the leading receiver in Edmonton's first preseason game, Parker suffered a non-contact ruptured Achilles tendon injury early in the second preseason game, and was ruled out for the season. He signed a contract extension through the 2021 season on January 11, 2021. He retired from football on June 25, 2021.

== Personal life ==
Parker was born to parents Anthony and Pamela while his father was playing for the BC Lions (1986–1989). His father played for the Calgary Stampeders in 1990 and he was raised in Alberta. His uncle, Andy Jonassen, also played for the Stampeders from 1976 to 1980.
