= Djems Kouamé =

Canadian football player

Profile
- Positions: Wide receiver, Defensive back

Personal information
- Born: April 5, 1989 (age 37); Montreal, Quebec, Canada
- Listed height: 6 ft 1 in (1.85 m)
- Listed weight: 185 lb (84 kg)

Career information
- University: Montréal
- CFL draft: 2011: 3rd round, 18th overall pick

Career history
- 2011–2012: Toronto Argonauts

Awards and highlights
- Grey Cup champion (2012)
- Stats at CFL.ca (archive)

Djems Kouamé (born April 5, 1989) is a Canadian former professional football wide receiver and defensive back in the Canadian Football League(CFL). He was drafted 18th overall by the Toronto Argonauts in the 2011 CFL draft and signed with the team on May 31, 2011. He played college football for the Montreal Carabins. On June 17, 2013, Kouamé was released by the Argonauts.
