= Pascal Baillargeon =

Canadian football player (born 1986)

No. 65, 67
- Position: Offensive lineman

Personal information
- Born: February 19, 1986 (age 40); St-Anselme, Quebec, Canada
- Listed height: 6 ft 5 in (1.96 m)
- Listed weight: 300 lb (136 kg)

Career information
- University: Laval
- CFL draft: 2011: 3rd round, 21st overall pick

Career history
- 2012–2013: Hamilton Tiger-Cats
- 2013–2014: Montreal Alouettes
- Stats at CFL.ca (archive)

Pascal Baillargeon (born February 19, 1986) is a Canadian former professional football offensive lineman. In the CFL’s Amateur Scouting Bureau December rankings, he was ranked as the 12th best player for players eligible in the 2011 CFL draft. Baillargeon was drafted 21st overall by the Hamilton Tiger-Cats in the 2011 CFL draft and after returning to Laval for 2011, he signed with Hamilton for the 2012 CFL season. He was released by the Tiger-Cats on July 18, 2013 and signed with the Montreal Alouettes a week later. He played CIS football with the Laval Rouge et Or.
