= Liam Mahoney =

Canadian football player (born 1987)

Profile
- Position: Wide receiver

Personal information
- Born: December 13, 1987 (age 38); Lachine, Quebec, Canada
- Listed height: 6 ft 1 in (1.85 m)
- Listed weight: 207 lb (94 kg)

Career information
- University: Concordia
- CFL draft: 2011: 6th round, 41st overall pick

Career history
- 2011: Winnipeg Blue Bombers*
- 2011: Hamilton Tiger-Cats
- 2014: Ottawa Redblacks*
- * Offseason or practice squad member only

Awards and highlights
- Peter Gorman Trophy (2007)
- Stats at CFL.ca

Liam Mahoney (born December 13, 1987) is a Canadian former professional football wide receiver. He was drafted 41st overall by the Winnipeg Blue Bombers in the 2011 CFL draft, but was released during training camp. He subsequently signed with the Hamilton Tiger-Cats on July 25, 2011. He spent one season with the Tiger-Cats and eventually signed with the RedBlacks on February 28, 2014. He played CIS football for the Concordia Stingers. He was released by the Ottawa Redblacks on April 29, 2014.
