= Richard Wade =

Richard Wade was a member of the Canadian Football League, working for the British Columbia Lions, the Calgary Stampeders, the Ottawa Renegades and the Hamilton Tiger-Cats. Wade entered the league as a guest coach in 2004 and subsequently held various player personnel, scouting and front office roles in the league through 2011.

Wade, an eight-year veteran of the Canadian Football League (CFL), was active in several roles with the British Columbia Lions (2006, 2007, 2011), the Calgary Stampeders (2004), the Ottawa Renegades (2005, 2006) and the Hamilton Tiger-Cats (2008, 2009, 2010). Primarily noted for his work in player personnel, recruiting and evaluation, Wade also held coaching positions with Calgary and Ottawa, where as an offensive assistant coach he worked with quarterbacks and receivers, the offensive line and special teams. In his only front office role, Wade was promoted to Director of Football development in Ottawa 2006 and tasked with re-structuring the club operations.

His development of import players additions was highlighted in his personnel work and in the identification, evaluations, workouts and signings of four import players who were named as CFL Rookies of the Year in 2011, 2007, 2006 and 2004. Wade planned and operated US free agent workout camps that produced numerous active roster impact players and was instrumental in assisting to rebuild the Hamilton Tiger-Cats from 2008 to 2010. During his tenure with the BC Lions, the team finished with records of 15–5 and 14–3–1, and won the Grey Cup Championship in 2006. (Ulrich V.P., Edwards H.S.)

== Football background ==
=== Coach Richard Wade ===
Wade would be named as Offensive Line and Special Teams Assistant Coach and responsible for the operation of the club's Player Personnel department working closely with Forrest Gregg, the Renegades executive Vice President.

Following his hire, he assumed the role of Director of Football Development for the Ottawa Renegades.

General Manager Forrest Gregg praised his talent and fit for the organization upon his arrival.

Head coach John Jenkins stated “Richard has already served us well as a regional scout in the Western United States, plus I worked with him when he was a guest coach with the Calgary Stampeders, so I know he will be a major asset for our organization."

After the Ottawa Renegades team was suspended Wade was picked up by the British Columbia Lions Football Club,

In 2006, the BC Lions won the Western Division and defeated the Montreal Alouettes 25–14 to win the Grey Cup Championship. Furthermore several players and staff won awards including Aaron Hunt (CFL Rookie of the Year), Brent Johnson (Most Outstanding Canadian and defensive Linemen), and Geroy Simon (CFL Top Offensive Linemen and CFL Most Outstanding Player). Head Coach Wally Buono would be named CFL Coach of the Year.

Returning in 2007, Wade would continue to work as a Regional Scout with Bob O'Billovich, the BC Lions Director of Player Personnel. During this period, Cameron Wake was named CFL Rookie of the Year, making it a total of three outstanding rookie recruits across three scouting programs Wade was involved in during a four year period.

12 March 2008 Wade joins Bob O'Billovich and the Hamilton Tiger-Cat in the Eastern Division of the Canadian Football League.

CFL players return to the NFL/ Wade Scouting Prospects and Quotes/ Hamilton Spectator Article

The death of both the Arena Football League and NFL Europa means that the CFL and the fledgling United Football League—a four-team league playing a six-game schedule—are the only remaining pro leagues.

Ticat general manager Bob O'Billovich says the evolution of the American game is also making CFL players more attractive.

"When you look at the style of play in the U.S now, in both college and the pros, teams are throwing the ball a lot more than they ever did in the past," O'Billovich said, citing the popularity of the spread offence. "Some of the NFL teams are going for the smaller, quicker guys rather than the big, bulky body-type guys. We've been playing with faster guys at most positions for years."

While O'Billovich says he doesn't mind losing players to the NFL -- "you can't fault them for wanting to give it a shot"—there are those around the CFL who have concerns.

"It says good things about our league that there are great players up here and people recognize that," Saskatchewan Roughriders' president-CEO Jim Hopson said this week after losing Chick to the Indianapolis Colts. "I would like to see it be clean -- you have a contract, you finish it and then you go. I'm not sure if that is in the best interest of the CFL at this point."

But Ticat scout Richard Wade, who scouted current Ticat starters DeAndra' Cobb and Marquay McDaniel among others, says there is an upside to the option year.

Wade noted that player transitions from the CFL to the NFL help attract a larger pool of talent and increase overall league competition.

"And more and more the players see it as a real chance to play now and still live the NFL dream. Replacing players has become better as a result of the flow."

Miami Dolphin "Phins" website/Wade Comment

Richard Wade was responsible for recruiting and signing Chris Wilson and Cam Wake, both of whom were able to make the jump from the CFL to the NFL. Wade is generally acknowledged as an excellent scout in the CFL league. Wade certainly has a valid argument in that it would be difficult to convince players in American colleges to consider playing in the CFL. Nonetheless, as more and more players find success in moving from the CFL to the NFL, this could change.

The CFL won't make any player wealthy, the #3 overall pick in 2009, Jamall Lee took a shot at the NFL as an UDFA in Carolina last preseason because even if he made the practice squad, his salary would be 5k a week, in the CFL he entire salary would have been 50,000..Canadian Dollars.

2011 Wade vacates Tiger-Cats player personnel role.

Wade departed the Hamilton Tiger-Cats in 2001 following a three-season tenure as a scout. The team will still heavily rely on Wade's previous prospects with over 19 of Wade's scouting projects still manning the Hamilton roster. These current T-cats include Chris Williams(New Mexico State), Pierre Singfield (Arizona State) and Mitch Mustain (Southern California) joining Markeith knowlton, Marquay McDaniel, Jason Boltus, Demonte Bolden and Justin Hick as other Tiger-Cat player additions. Between 2008 and 2010, Hamilton's regular season record improved from 3–15 to consecutive 9–9 finishes, securing two home playoff appearances.

== Canadian Football League 2004-Present ==
- 2004 Calgary Stampeders, Quarterbacks and Receivers
- 2005 Ottawa Renegades, Western Regional Scout
- 2006 Ottawa Renegades, Offensive Line Coach, Player Personnel Director
- 2006-2007 British Columbia Lions , Western Regional Scout
- 2008–2011 Hamilton Tiger-Cats, Western Regional Scout
- 2011–present British Columbia Lions Western Regional Scout
