= Vaughn Martin =

Jamaica-born American football player (born 1986)

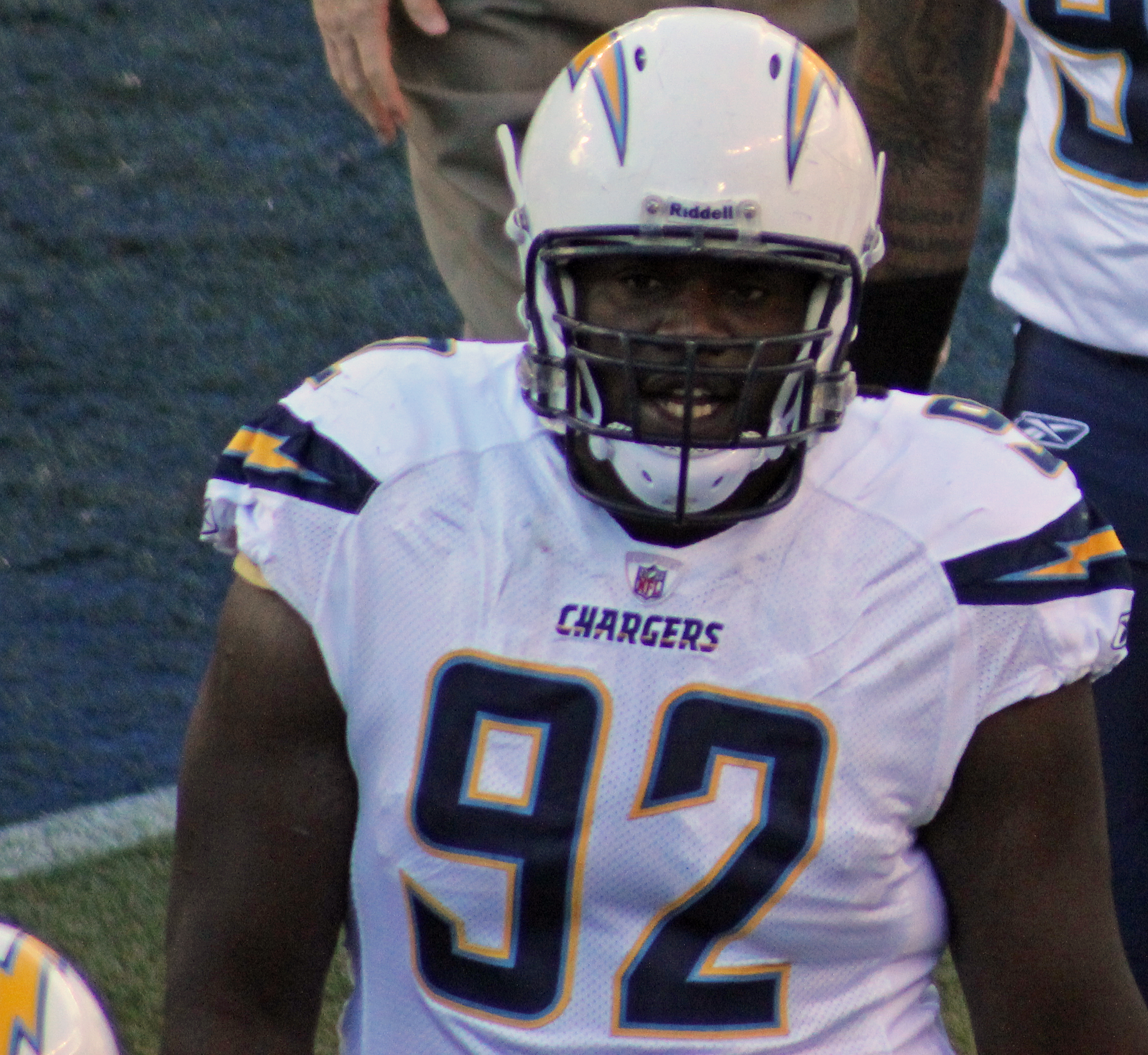
- Martin with the San Diego Chargers in 2011

No. 92, 90, 72
- Position: Defensive tackle

Personal information
- Born: April 18, 1986 (age 40); Lucea, Hanover, Jamaica
- Listed height: 6 ft 4 in (1.93 m)
- Listed weight: 297 lb (135 kg)

Career information
- High school: London South Collegiate Institute (London, Ontario, Canada)
- University: Western Ontario
- NFL draft: 2009: 4th round, 113th overall pick
- CFL draft: 2011: 5th round, 39th overall pick

Career history
- San Diego Chargers (2009–2012); Miami Dolphins (2013); Detroit Lions (2014)*; Kansas City Chiefs (2015)*; Montreal Alouettes (2016)
- * Offseason or practice squad member only

Career NFL statistics
- Total tackles: 79
- Sacks: 3.0
- Forced fumbles: 1
- Stats at Pro Football Reference

Vaughn Martin (born April 18, 1986) is a Jamaican-born Canadian former professional football defensive tackle. He was selected by the San Diego Chargers in the fourth round of the 2009 NFL draft, the first Canadian university football player drafted by an NFL team as an underclassman. He played university football at the University of Western Ontario.

== Early life ==
Martin was born in Jamaica and raised in Toronto and London, Ontario with his mother and sister. He attended London South Collegiate Institute, playing football for head coach Chris Marcus, and later Mike Stenning. He also attended The Kiski School under coach Marcus Muster for a short time before transferring. He competed as a linebacker, defensive end, defensive tackle and fullback in high school, recording 90 tackles with five stops behind the line of scrimmage in 2004. The three-time starter was rated one of the top 12 defensive ends in Ontario by All-Star Football and Weir's Magazine. He also received a two-star prospect rating from Rivals.com.

Prior to beginning his collegiate career, Martin competed for two summers with the Forest City Thunderbirds in the Central Ontario Football League. He also was a member of Team Canada, playing in the 2006 NFL Global Junior Championship in Detroit. He was named to the NFL Global Junior Championship X All-Tournament Team after helping Team Canada to a perfect 5-0 record, including five shutouts.

== University career ==
Martin turned down scholarship offers from the University of Toledo, the University at Buffalo, and Ohio University to enroll at Michigan State University in 2006, but failed to qualify due to academic transcript issues. He then enrolled at Milford Academy, a preparatory school in New York. He later returned home to Ontario, where University of Western Ontario assistant coach Mickey Donovan along with special teams coach Chris Marcus — Vaughn's high-school coach and mentor — convinced him to enroll.

Martin joined the Western Ontario Mustangs football team and saw action at defensive tackle and end during his first season. In 2008, Martin performed mostly at defensive tackle earlier in the year, but he also at defensive end. In 12 games, he collected 36 tackles (22 solos) with 3.5 sacks, 7.5 stops behind the line of scrimmage and 13 pressures. He returned an interception for a touchdown, registered a safety, caused a fumble and recovered two others. He also played fullback, where he scored twice on a pair of 3-yard rushing attempts, finishing with 10 yards on four carries.

== Professional career ==
=== Pre-draft ===
Martin was not invited to the 2009 NFL Scouting Combine, but impressed several pro scouts in the spring of 2009 when he participated at the University of Michigan's Pro Day, where he ran a 4.96 second 40-yard dash at 330 pounds. He also set the 2009 draft class bench press record, lifting 225 pounds 44 times.

=== San Diego Chargers ===
Martin became the first CIS football player drafted as an underclassman when he was picked in the fourth round, 113th overall, by the San Diego Chargers in the 2009 NFL draft. Martin signed a four-year contract with the Chargers in July 2009. Athletic and intelligent—he scored an impressive 38 on the NFL's Wonderlic Test—scouts also report that he has the bulk, strength, and agility to become a nose tackle like Jamal Williams. He recorded his first career sack on November 22, 2010, against the Denver Broncos, sacking quarterback Kyle Orton.

On May 8, 2011, the Montreal Alouettes selected Vaughn Martin in the 5th round of the 2011 CFL draft. His rights belonged to the Alouettes if Martin choose to pursue a career in the CFL.

=== Miami Dolphins ===
Martin signed with the Miami Dolphins as a free agent on March 28, 2013. On November 8, he was released by the Dolphins.

=== Detroit Lions ===
Martin signed with the Detroit Lions on March 13, 2014. He was released by Detroit on June 2.

=== Kansas City Chiefs ===
Martin signed with the Kansas City Chiefs on February 2, 2015. He was released by Kansas City on August 30.

=== Montreal Alouettes ===
Martin signed a two-year contract with the Montreal Alouettes of the Canadian Football League on February 10, 2016. Martin played in seven games during the 2016 CFL season before being released on August 17, about halfway through the season.
