= Carlos Thomas =

American gridiron football player (born 1987)

No. 11
- Position: Defensive back

Personal information
- Born: May 1, 1987 (age 39); College Park, Georgia, U.S.
- Listed height: 5 ft 11 in (1.80 m)
- Listed weight: 197 lb (89 kg)

Career information
- College: South Carolina

Career history
- 2009: San Francisco 49ers*
- 2009: Saskatchewan Roughriders
- 2010: Edmonton Eskimos*
- 2011–2012: Hamilton Tiger-Cats
- 2013–2014: Saskatchewan Roughriders
- * Offseason or practice squad member only

Awards and highlights
- Grey Cup champion (2013)
- Stats at CFL.ca

Carlos Thomas (born May 1, 1987) is an American former professional football defensive back. He was signed by the San Francisco 49ers as an undrafted free agent in 2009.

== College career ==
Thomas played college football at South Carolina. He played 48 games, recording 60 tackles, 2.5 Tackles for loss, 12 Passes defended and 6 interceptions.

== Professional career ==
=== San Francisco 49ers ===
After he went undrafted in the 2009 NFL draft, he was signed by the San Francisco 49ers as an undrafted free agent. He was waived on August 30.

=== Saskatchewan Roughriders ===
On October 20, 2009, he was signed by the Saskatchewan Roughriders and placed on their Developmental Squad.
