= 2011 CFL draft =

Canadian football draft

General information
- Sport: Canadian football
- Date: May 8
- Time: 12:30 PM ET
- Location: Toronto
- Network: TSN

Overview
- 47 total selections in 6 rounds
- First selection: Henoc Muamba
- Most selections: Toronto Argonauts (7); Montreal Alouettes (7); Hamilton Tiger-Cats (7)
- Fewest selections: Edmonton Eskimos (4)
- CIS selections: 34
- NCAA selections: 13

The 2011 CFL draft took place on Sunday, May 8, 2011 at 12:30 PM ET on TSN. 47 players were chosen from among eligible players from Canadian Universities across the country, as well as Canadian players playing in the NCAA. The Toronto Argonauts, Montreal Alouettes and Hamilton Tiger-Cats had the most draft selections with a total of seven apiece. Next came the Calgary Stampeders and Winnipeg Blue Bombers who each had six selections. The BC Lions and Saskatchewan Roughriders both picked five times. The Edmonton Eskimos had the fewest picks, with only four. A total of five trades involving 14 draft picks were made on the draft day itself. Of the 47 draft selections, 34 players were drafted from Canadian Interuniversity Sport institutions.

== Top prospects ==
Source: CFL Scouting Bureau final rankings.

Final Ranking	December Ranking	September Ranking	Player	Position	School
1	2	2	Scott Mitchell	Offensive lineman	Rice
2	3	3	Anthony Parker	Wide receiver	Calgary
3	10	11	Henoc Muamba	Linebacker	St. Francis Xavier
4	1	1	Philip Blake	Offensive lineman	Baylor
5	5	9	Tyler Holmes	Offensive lineman	Tulsa
6	4	8	Vaughn Martin	Defensive lineman	Western Ontario
7	7	7	Nathan Coehoorn	Wide receiver	Calgary
8	11	10	Hugh O'Neill	Punter/Kicker	Alberta
9	–	–	Marco Iannuzzi	Wide receiver	Harvard
10	6	4	Moe Petrus	Offensive lineman	Connecticut
11	8	6	Matt O'Donnell	Offensive lineman	Queen's
12	–	–	Junior Turner	Defensive lineman	Bishop's
13	13	–	Anthony Barrette	Offensive lineman	Concordia
14	14	14	Matt Walter	Running back	Calgary
15	–	–	Paul Swiston	Offensive lineman	Calgary
–	9	5	Renaldo Sagesse	Defensive lineman	Michigan
–	12	15	Pascal Baillargeon	Offensive lineman	Laval
–	15	–	Jade Etienne	Wide receiver	Saskatchewan
–	–	12	Gregory Alexandre	Defensive lineman	Montréal
–	–	13	Michael Carter	Defensive back	Maryland

== Trades ==
In the explanations below, (D) denotes trades that took place during the draft, while (PD) indicates trades completed pre-draft.

=== Round one ===
- BC → Calgary (D). BC traded this selection, the 26th overall pick and the 34th overall pick in this year's draft to Calgary for the sixth overall pick, the 11th overall pick and the 37th overall pick.
- Toronto → Winnipeg (PD). Toronto traded this selection and a conditional fourth round pick in the 2012 CFL draft to Winnipeg for Steven Jyles.
- Hamilton → Edmonton (D). Hamilton traded this selection and the rights to Zipp Duncan to Edmonton for the 10th overall pick and the 13th overall pick in this year's draft.
- Calgary → BC (D). Calgary traded this selection, the 11th overall pick and the 37th overall pick in this year's draft to BC for the third overall pick, the 26th overall pick and the 34th overall pick.
- Saskatchewan → Toronto (D). Saskatchewan traded this selection to Toronto for the 12th overall pick and the 27th overall pick in this year's draft.

=== Round two ===
- Winnipeg → Calgary (PD). Winnipeg traded this selection to Calgary for defensive back Lenny Walls.
- Edmonton → Hamilton (D). Edmonton traded this selection and the 13th overall pick in this year's draft to Hamilton for the fifth overall pick and the rights to Zipp Duncan.
- BC → Calgary (PD). BC traded this selection and a conditional fourth-round pick in the 2012 CFL draft to Calgary for Jesse Newman.
- Calgary → BC (D). Calgary traded this selection, the sixth overall pick and the 37th overall pick in this year's draft to BC for the third overall pick, the 26th overall pick and the 34th overall pick.
- Toronto → Saskatchewan (D). Toronto traded this selection and the 27th overall pick in this year's draft to Saskatchewan for the seventh overall pick.
- Hamilton → Edmonton (PD). Hamilton traded this selection and the rights to Dalin Tollestrup to Edmonton for Justin Medlock, Carlos Thomas, a third round pick in the 2011 draft, and a fifth round pick in the 2011 draft.
- Edmonton → Hamilton (D). Edmonton traded this selection and the 10th overall pick in this year's draft to Hamilton for the fifth overall pick and the rights to Zipp Duncan.
- Calgary → Edmonton (D). Calgary traded this selection to Calgary for the rights to Brian Bulcke.

=== Round three ===
- Edmonton → Hamilton (PD). Edmonton traded this selection, a 2011 fifth round selection, Justin Medlock and Carlos Thomas to Hamilton for a 2011 second round pick and the rights to Dalin Tollestrup.
- Hamilton → Toronto (PD). Hamilton traded this selection, a 2010 third-round selection, and the rights to prospect Corey Mace to Toronto for Arland Bruce III.
- Toronto → Saskatchewan (PD). Toronto traded this selection, T. J. Acree, and the rights to Brian Smith to Saskatchewan for Ronald Flemons and a 5th round pick in the 2011 draft.
- Saskatchewan → Hamilton (PD). Saskatchewan traded this selection, Adam Nicolson, and an unnamed player from Saskatchewan's negotiation list to Hamilton for Prechae Rodriguez.
- Saskatchewan → Toronto (PD). Saskatchewan traded this selection to Toronto for Michael Bishop.

=== Round four ===
- Toronto → Montreal (PD). Toronto traded this selection to Montreal for Chad Owens.
- BC → Calgary (D). BC traded this selection, the third overall pick and the 34th overall pick in this year's draft to Calgary for the sixth overall pick, the 11th overall pick and the 37th overall pick.
- Toronto → Saskatchewan (D). Toronto traded this selection and the 12th overall pick in this year's draft to Saskatchewan for the seventh overall pick.
- Hamilton → Toronto (PD). Hamilton traded this selection and a conditional 2013 draft selection to Toronto for Brian Ramsay.

=== Round five ===
- Winnipeg → Edmonton (PD). Winnipeg traded this selection to Edmonton for the rights to Kelly Butler.
- Edmonton → Winnipeg (PD). Edmonton traded this selection and a 6th round pick in the 2011 draft to Winnipeg for Taylor Inglis.
- Edmonton → Hamilton (PD). Edmonton traded this selection, a 2011 third round selection, Justin Medlock and Carlos Thomas to Hamilton for a 2011 second round pick and the rights to Dalin Tollestrup.
- BC → Calgary (D). BC traded this selection, the third overall pick and the 26th overall pick in this year's draft to Calgary for the sixth overall pick, the 11th overall pick and the 37th overall pick.
- Calgary → BC (D). Calgary traded this selection, the sixth overall pick and the 11th overall pick in this year's draft to BC for the third overall pick, the 26th overall pick and the 34th overall pick.
- Saskatchewan → Toronto (PD). Saskatchewan traded this selection and Ronald Flemons to Toronto for T. J. Acree, the rights to Brian Smith, and a 3rd round pick in the 2011 draft.

=== Round six ===
- Winnipeg → Saskatchewan (PD). Winnipeg traded this selection to Saskatchewan for James Johnson.
- Edmonton → Winnipeg (PD). Edmonton traded this selection and a 5th round pick in the 2011 draft to Winnipeg for Taylor Inglis.
- Saskatchewan → Edmonton (D). Saskatchewan traded this selection to Edmonton for Graeme Bell.

== Forfeitures ==
- Calgary forfeited their third round selection after selecting Johnny Forzani in the 2010 Supplemental Draft.

== Draft order ==
= CFL Division All-Star	= CFL All-Star	= Hall of Famer

=== Round one ===
Pick #	CFL team	Player	Position	School
1	Winnipeg Blue Bombers	Henoc Muamba	LB	St. Francis Xavier
2	Edmonton Eskimos	Scott Mitchell	OL	Rice
3	Calgary Stampeders (via BC)	Anthony Parker	WR	Calgary
4	Winnipeg Blue Bombers (via Toronto)	Jade Etienne	WR	Saskatchewan
5	Edmonton Eskimos (via Hamilton)	Nathan Coehoorn	WR	Calgary
6	BC Lions (via Calgary)	Marco Iannuzzi	WR	Harvard
7	Toronto Argonauts (via Saskatchewan)	Tyler Holmes	OL	Tulsa
8	Montreal Alouettes	Brody McKnight	K/P	Montana

=== Round two ===
Pick #	CFL team	Player	Position	School
9	Calgary Stampeders (via Winnipeg)	Junior Turner	DL	Bishop's
10	Hamilton Tiger-Cats (via Edmonton)	Moe Petrus	OL	Connecticut
11	BC Lions (via Calgary via BC)	Hugh O'Neill	K/P	Alberta
12	Saskatchewan Roughriders (via Toronto)	Craig Butler	DB	Western Ontario
13	Hamilton Tiger-Cats (via Edmonton via Hamilton)	Maurice Forbes	DL	Concordia
14	Edmonton Eskimos (via Calgary)	Hugo Lopez	DB	Toronto
15	Saskatchewan Roughriders	Matt O'Donnell	OL	Queen's
16	Montreal Alouettes	Anthony Barrette	OL	Concordia

=== Round three ===
Pick #	CFL team	Player	Position	School
17	Winnipeg Blue Bombers	Brendan Dunn	DL/OL	Western Ontario
18	Toronto Argonauts (via Hamilton via Edmonton)	Djems Kouame	WR	Montréal
19	BC Lions	Michael Carter	DB	Maryland
20	Hamilton Tiger-Cats (via Saskatchewan via Toronto)	Marc-Antoine Fortin	DL	Laval
21	Hamilton Tiger-Cats	Pascal Baillargeon	OL	Laval
–	Calgary Stampeders	Forfeit Pick		
22	Toronto Argonauts (via Saskatchewan)	Zander Robinson	DL	Western Ontario
23	Montreal Alouettes	Philip Blake	OL	Baylor

=== Round four ===
Pick #	CFL team	Player	Position	School
24	Winnipeg Blue Bombers	Paul Swiston	OL	Calgary
25	Montreal Alouettes (via Toronto via Edmonton)	Renaldo Sagesse	DL	Michigan
26	Calgary Stampeders (via BC)	Akwasi Antwi	DL	Mount Allison
27	Saskatchewan Roughriders (via Toronto)	Alexander Krausnick-Groh	OL	Calgary
28	Toronto Argonauts (via Hamilton)	Jedd Gardner	WR	Guelph
29	Calgary Stampeders	Brad Sinopoli	QB	Ottawa
30	Saskatchewan Roughriders	Christopher Milo	K/P	Laval
31	Montreal Alouettes	Reed Alexander	OL	Calgary

=== Round five ===
Pick #	CFL team	Player	Position	School
32	Winnipeg Blue Bombers (via Edmonton via Winnipeg)	Carl Volny	RB	Central Michigan
33	Hamilton Tiger-Cats (via Edmonton)	Patrick Jean-Mary	LB	Howard
34	Calgary Stampeders (via BC)	Matt Walter	RB	Calgary
35	Toronto Argonauts	Gregory Alexandre	DL	Montréal
36	Hamilton Tiger-Cats	Tyrell Francisco	TE	Weber State
37	BC Lions (via Calgary)	Yannick Sage	OL	Sherbrooke
38	Toronto Argonauts (via Saskatchewan)	Julian Feoli-Gudino	WR	Laval
39	Montreal Alouettes	Vaughn Martin	DL	Western Ontario

=== Round six ===
Pick #	CFL team	Player	Position	School
40	Saskatchewan Roughriders (via Winnipeg)	Kyle Exume	RB	Bishop's
41	Winnipeg Blue Bombers (via Edmonton)	Liam Mahoney	WR	Concordia
42	BC Lions	Chris Hodgson	DL	Saint Mary's
43	Toronto Argonauts	Michael Knill	OL	Wilfrid Laurier
44	Hamilton Tiger-Cats	Jadon Wagner	LB	BYU
45	Calgary Stampeders	Jared Manchulenko	TE	Concordia
46	Edmonton Eskimos (via Saskatchewan)	Youssy Pierre	WR	Montréal
47	Montreal Alouettes	Blaine Ruttan	LB	Carson-Newman
