= 2014 Toronto Argonauts season =

CFL team season

- General manager: Jim Barker
- Head coach: Scott Milanovich
- Home stadium: Rogers Centre

Results
- Record: 8–10
- Division place: 3rd, East
- Playoffs: did not qualify

Uniform

The 2014 Toronto Argonauts season was their 57th season in the Canadian Football League and their 142nd season overall. The Argonauts finished in third place in the East Division but missed out on a playoff spot due to the crossover rule. The 9–9 BC Lions, fourth place in the West Division, had a better record and therefore eliminated the Argos from the playoffs.

Entering the final game of the season at 7–10 against the Ottawa Redblacks, the Argos needed to win to keep their playoff hopes alive, which they did. They also needed Hamilton to lose to Montreal for the Argos to finish second and make the playoffs ahead of the crossover team, the BC Lions. However, the Ti-Cats won that game, eliminating the Argos from the playoffs on the last day of the regular season.

== Offseason ==
=== CFL draft ===
The 2014 CFL draft took place on May 13, 2014. The Argonauts had eight selections in the seven-round draft. They concluded a trade with the Edmonton Eskimos to secure the third overall pick, enabling them to draft Anthony Coombs. That trade saw their second round selection go to Edmonton in exchange for another third round selection.

Round	Pick	Player	Position	School/Club team
1	3	Anthony Coombs	RB	Manitoba
3	21	Jaskaran Dhillon	OL	British Columbia
4	33	Thomas Miles	LB	Manitoba
4	36	Alexandre Dupuis	FB	Montreal
5	38	Eric Black	DB	Saint Mary's
5	42	Evan Pszczonak	WR	Windsor
6	51	Tore Corrado	WR	Simon Fraser
7	60	Kirby Fletcher	DL	Acadia

== Preseason ==
Week	Date	Kickoff	Opponent	Results		TV	Venue	Attendance	Summary
Week	Date	Kickoff	Opponent	Score	Record	TV	Venue	Attendance	Summary
A	Mon, June 9	8:30 p.m. EDT	at Winnipeg Blue Bombers	W 24–22	1–0	TSN	Investors Group Field	24,000	Recap
B	Bye								
C	Thur, June 19	7:00 p.m. EDT	vs. Hamilton Tiger-Cats	W 41–23	2–0	None	Varsity Stadium	5,216	Recap

# Games played with white uniforms.

== Regular season ==
=== Standings ===
East Division
Team	GP	W	L	T	PF	PA	Pts	
Hamilton Tiger-Cats	18	9	9	0	417	395	18	Details
Montreal Alouettes	18	9	9	0	360	394	18	Details
Toronto Argonauts	18	8	10	0	450	456	16	Details
Ottawa Redblacks	18	2	16	0	278	465	4	Details

Toronto missed the playoffs, as a third-place team having an inferior record to the fourth-place team in the other division, the 9-9 BC Lions.

=== Schedule ===
Win Loss Tie

Week	Date	Kickoff	Opponent	Results		TV	Venue	Attendance	Summary
Week	Date	Kickoff	Opponent	Score	Record	TV	Venue	Attendance	Summary
1	Thur, June 26	8:30 p.m. EDT	at Winnipeg Blue Bombers	L 21–45	0–1	TSN/RDS2	Investors Group Field	24,872	Recap
2	Sat, July 5	3:00 p.m. EDT	vs. Saskatchewan Roughriders	W 48–15	1–1	TSN/RDS2/ESPN2	Rogers Centre	17,758	Recap
3	Sat, July 12	6:30 p.m. EDT	vs. Calgary Stampeders	L 15–34	1–2	TSN	Rogers Centre	16,102	Recap
4	Fri, July 18	7:00 p.m. EDT	at Ottawa Redblacks	L 17–18	1–3	TSN/RDS	TD Place Stadium	24,326	Recap
5	Sat, July 26	10:00 p.m. EDT	at Saskatchewan Roughriders	L 9–37	1–4	TSN/ESPN2	Mosaic Stadium	32,621	Recap
6	Fri, Aug 1	7:00 p.m. EDT	at Montreal Alouettes	W 31–5	2–4	TSN/RDS	Molson Stadium	20,692	Recap
7	Bye								
8	Tues, Aug 12	7:30 p.m. EDT	vs. Winnipeg Blue Bombers	W 38–21	3–4	TSN/RDS2	Rogers Centre	18,106	Recap
8	Sun, Aug 17	7:30 p.m. EDT	vs. BC Lions	L 17–33	3–5	TSN/RDS2	Rogers Centre	18,283	Recap
9	Sat, Aug 23	4:00 p.m. EDT	at Edmonton Eskimos	L 27–41	3–6	TSN	Commonwealth Stadium	33,767	Recap
10	Mon, Sept 1	1:00 p.m. EDT	at Hamilton Tiger-Cats	L 12–13	3–7	TSN	Tim Hortons Field	18,135	Recap
11	Bye								
12	Sat, Sept 13	7:00 p.m. EDT	at Calgary Stampeders	L 33–40	3–8	TSN/RDS2	McMahon Stadium	28,607	Recap
13	Fri, Sept 19	10:00 p.m. EDT	at BC Lions	W 40–23	4–8	TSN	BC Place	27,038	Recap
14	Bye								
15	Sat, Oct 4	4:00 p.m. EDT	vs. Edmonton Eskimos	W 33–32	5–8	TSN	Rogers Centre	16,276	Recap
16	Fri, Oct 10	7:00 p.m. EDT	vs. Hamilton Tiger-Cats	W 34–33	6–8	TSN	Rogers Centre	17,811	Recap
17	Sat, Oct 18	4:00 p.m. EDT	vs. Montreal Alouettes	L 12–20	6–9	TSN/RDS	Rogers Centre	16,834	Recap
18	Sat, Oct 25	4:00 p.m. EDT	vs. Hamilton Tiger-Cats	W 26–24	7–9	TSN/RDS2	Rogers Centre	19,258	Recap
19	Sun, Nov 2	12:00 p.m. EST	at Montreal Alouettes	L 14–17	7–10	TSN/RDS	Molson Stadium	22,013	Recap
20	Fri, Nov 7	7:00 p.m. EST	vs. Ottawa Redblacks	W 23–5	8–10	TSN/RDS2	Rogers Centre	19,687	Recap

# Games played with colour uniforms.
# Games played with white uniforms.
# Games played with alternate uniforms.

== Roster ==
2014 Toronto Argonauts final roster
Quarterbacks: 16 Mitchell Gale; 7 Trevor Harris; 12 Logan Kilgore; Running backs: 43 Alexandre Dupuis; 20 Steve Slaton; 21 Anthony Woodson; Receivers: 11 Natey Adjei; 81 Jason Barnes; 88 Mike Bradwell; 85 John Chiles; 86 Maurice Mann; 2 Chad Owens; 87 Zander Robinson; 89 Spencer Watt	Offensive linemen: 57 Tyler Holmes G; 67 Jeff Keeping C; 62 Scott Mitchell G; 66 SirVincent Rogers T; 59 Matt Sewell T/G; 52 Wayne Smith G; 54 Chris Van Zeyl T; Defensive linemen: 97 Ivan Brown DE; 94 Euclid Cummings DT; 77 Logan Harrell DT; 93 Delano Johnson DT; 91 Tristan Okpalaugo DE; 51 Aston Whiteside DE	Linebackers: 41 Shea Emry; 27 Cory Greenwood; 53 Greg Jones; 48 Thomas Miles; 36 Nick Rosamonda; 40 Herve Tonye-Tonye; 47 James Yurichuk; Defensive backs: 5 Jermaine Gabriel; 35 Isaiah Green; 8 Shane Herbert; 28 Orhian Johnson; 4 Jamie Robinson; 26 Branden Smith; 6 Alex Suber	Special teams: 58 Jake Reinhart LS; 34 Swayze Waters K/P; Reserve roster: 25 Jonathan Hood DB; 61 Jarriel King T; Practice roster: 14 Eric Black DB; 69 Branndon Braxton T; 63 Jaskaran Dhillon C/G; 18 Jarred Fayson SB; 10 Robert Gill SB; 33 Armond Smith RB; 80 Darryl Surgent WR	Injured list: 9 Darvin Adams WR (6 Game); 23 Vince Agnew DB (1 Game); 39 Matt Black S (1 Game); 19 Jalil Carter DB (6 Game); 1 Anthony Coombs SB (6 Game); 74 Dexter Davis DE (1 Game); 38 Marcus Dowtin LB (1 Game); 32 Andre Durie SB (6 Game); 45 Brendan Gillanders FB (6 Game); 83 Mark Harrison WR (1 Game); 90 Cleyon Laing DT (6 Game); 24 Evan McCollough DB (1 Game); 84 Kashif Moore WR (1 Game); 56 Kyle Moore DE (6 Game); 15 Ricky Ray QB (1 Game); 29 Curtis Steele RB (1 Game); 79 Marcus Thomas DT (1 Game); 42 Donald Washington DB (6 Game); 49 Nick Williams LB (6 Game); Italics indicates American player Roster updated 2026-05-13; Transactions (argonauts.ca); Transactions (cfl.ca)

== Coaching staff ==
Toronto Argonauts staff
Front office: Owner – David Braley; President and ceo – Chris Rudge; Vice-Chair – Michael Clemons; General manager – Jim Barker; Director of football operations – Ian Sanderson; Director of player personnel – Chris Rossetti; US Scouting Coordinator - Demetri Betzios; Football operations consultant – Nick Volpe; Head coaches: Head coach – Scott Milanovich; Offensive coaches: Offensive coordinator – Marcus Brady; Receivers – Jason Maas; Offensive line – Bryan Chiu; Running backs/video coordinator – Anthony Ierullo	Defensive coaches: Defensive coordinator – Tim Burke; Linebackers – Casey Creehan; Defensive line – Will Plemons; Defensive assistant – Eddie Brown; Special teams coaches: Special teams coordinator – Jim Daley; Special teams assistant – Eddie Brown; → Coaching staff
