= 2013 Calgary Stampeders season =

Canadian football team season

- Owner: Calgary Sports and Entertainment
- General manager: John Hufnagel
- Head coach: John Hufnagel
- Home stadium: McMahon Stadium

Results
- Record: 14–4
- Division place: 1st, West
- Playoffs: Lost West Final
- Team MOP: Jon Cornish
- Team MOC: Jon Cornish
- Team MOR: Brett Jones

Uniform

The 2013 Calgary Stampeders season was the 56th season for the team in the Canadian Football League (CFL) and their 79th overall. The Stampeders attempted to win their 7th Grey Cup championship, but fell in the West Final to the eventual champion Saskatchewan Roughriders.

== Offseason ==
=== CFL draft ===
The 2013 CFL draft took place on May 6, 2013. The Stampeders had seven selections in the seven-round draft, with an additional pick in the second round.

Round	Pick	Player	Position	School/Club team
1	7	Brander Craighead	OL	UTEP
2	13	Ben D'Aguilar	DE	McMaster
2	16	Brett Jones	OL	Regina
3	25	Yannick Morin Plante	WR	Laval
4	28	Charlie Power	WR	Saskatchewan
6	48	Shane Bergman	OL	Western
7	59	Dumitru Ionita	P	Concordia

== Preseason ==
Week	Date	Opponent	Score	Result	Attendance	Record
A	Fri, June 14	vs. BC Lions	29–27	Loss	26,328	0–1
B	Thurs, June 20	at Saskatchewan Roughriders	24–23	Win	32,003	1–1

== Regular season ==
=== Season standings ===
West Division
Team	GP	W	L	T	PF	PA	Pts	
Calgary Stampeders	18	14	4	0	549	413	28	Details
Saskatchewan Roughriders	18	11	7	0	519	398	22	Details
BC Lions	18	11	7	0	504	461	22	Details
Edmonton Eskimos	18	4	14	0	421	519	8	Details

=== Season schedule ===
Week	Date	Opponent	Score	Result	Attendance	Record	TV
1	Fri, June 28	vs. BC Lions	44–32	Win	26,625	1–0	TSN/RDS2/ESPN3
2	Fri, July 5	at Saskatchewan Roughriders	36–21	Loss	35,296	1–1	TSN/RDS2/ESPN3
3	Fri, July 12	at Montreal Alouettes	22–14	Win	23,184	2–1	TSN/RDS/ESPN3
4	Sat, July 20	vs. Montreal Alouettes	38–27	Win	27,378	3–1	TSN/RDS/ESPN2
5	Fri, July 26	at Winnipeg Blue Bombers	37–24	Win	31,567	4–1	TSN/RDS2/ESPN3
6	Bye						
7	Fri, Aug 9	vs. Saskatchewan Roughriders	42–27	Win	35,637	5–1	TSN/RDS2/NBCSN
8	Sat, Aug 17	at BC Lions	26–22	Loss	29,201	5–2	TSN/RDS2/ESPN3
9	Fri, Aug 23	at Toronto Argonauts	35–14	Win	21,157	6–2	TSN/RDS2/ESPN3
10	Mon, Sept 2	vs. Edmonton Eskimos	37–34	Win	32,217	7–2	TSN/NBCSN
11	Fri, Sept 6	at Edmonton Eskimos	22–12	Win	33,654	8–2	TSN/RDS2/NBCSN
12	Fri, Sept 13	vs. Hamilton Tiger-Cats	26–22	Win	26,649	9–2	TSN/RDS2/ESPN3
13	Sat, Sept 21	vs. Toronto Argonauts	33–27	Loss	28,781	9–3	TSN/RDS2/ESPN3
14	Sat, Sept 28	at Hamilton Tiger-Cats	35–11	Win	13,248	10–3	TSN/ESPN3
15	Sat, Oct 5	vs. Winnipeg Blue Bombers	38–11	Win	26,293	11–3	TSN/ESPN3
16	Fri, Oct 11	vs. BC Lions	40–26	Win	26,115	12–3	TSN/ESPN3
17	Fri, Oct 18	at Edmonton Eskimos	27–13	Win	27,633	13–3	TSN/NBCSN
18	Sat, Oct 26	vs. Saskatchewan Roughriders	29–25	Win	33,671	14–3	TSN/ESPN3
19	Fri, Nov 1	at BC Lions	26–7	Loss	27,228	14–4	TSN/RDS2/ESPN3

== Team ==
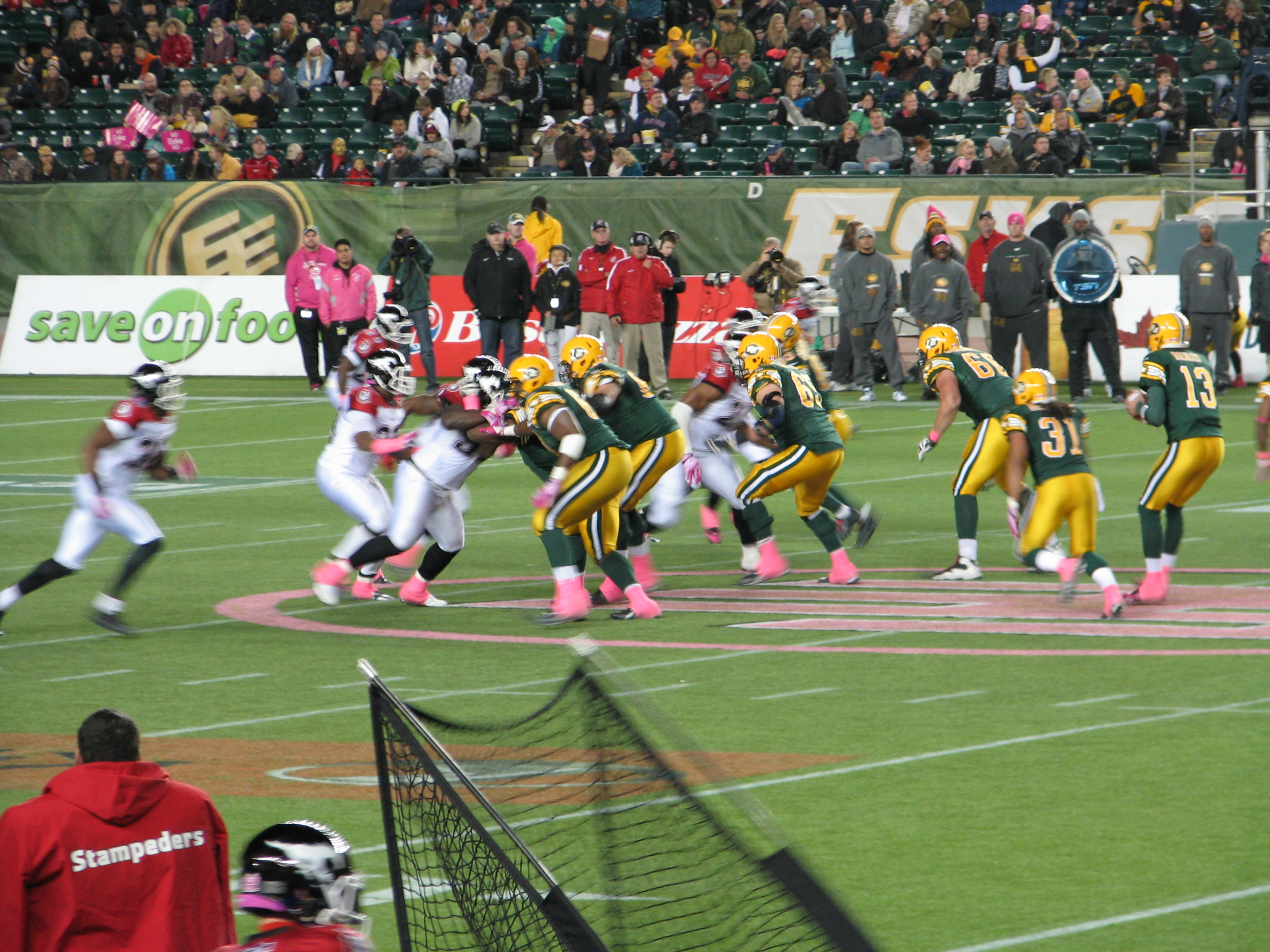
The Calgary Stampeders play the Edmonton Eskimos at Commonwealth Stadium on Friday, 18 October 2013. The Stampeders beat the home town Eskimos by a score of 27-13. Each year the CFL sets aside a weekend to raise awareness for women's cancers and players wear pink tape and gloves to highlight this awareness.

=== Roster ===
Jersey	Name	Position	Seasons Played	Age†	Regular GP (GS)*	Playoff GP*
87	Armstrong, Spencer	WR	1	27	1 (0)	0
78	Arnett, Alric	WR	1	26	1 (0)	0
81	Arthur, Jabari	WR	5	30	18 (12)	1
8	Bennett, Fred	DB	5	29	18 (18)	1
21	Berger, Adam	DB	4	23	1 (0)	0
60	Bergman, Shane	OL	5	23	1 (1)	0
95	Bishop, Freddie III	DL	3	23	2 (2)	1
96	Bolden, Demonte	DL	3	27	17 (17)	0
47	Bowen, Alvin	LB	1	29	11 (0)	0
32	Brooks, Derrius	DB	2	25	11 (10)	1
0	Butler, Quincy	DB	3	31	3 (3)	0
88	Carr, Greg	WR	1	27	5 (2)	0
48	Carter, Yannick	LB	2	29	14 (0)	1
56	Chevrier, Randy	OL	8	37	18 (0)	1
9	Cornish, Jon	RB	9	28	17 (17)	1
26	Cote, Rob	RB	11	26	16 (16)	1
77	D'Aguilar, Ben	DL	4	23	12 (0)	0
64	Deane, J'Micheal	OL	3	27	15 (6)	0
41	DeSouza, Wilkerson	RB	1	26	3 (0)	0
65	Federkeil, Dan	OL	5	29	11 (11)	1
7	Fraser, Eric	DB	4	26	17 (14)	1
31	Fuller, Jeff	WR	2	23	3 (3)	1
15	Glenn, Kevin	QB	2	34	18 (13)	1
63	Gott, Jon	OL	5	27	16 (15)	1
62	Harrison, Edwin II	OL	4	28	9 (9)	1
84	Hawthorne, Tim	WR	1	25	3 (3)	0
27	Hecht, Jeff	DB	5	27	16 (1)	1
1	Hefney, Jonathan	DB	1	28	11 (2)	0
39	Hughes, Charleston	DE	10	29	16 (16)	1
98	Huntley, Kevin	DL	1	31	4 (4)	0
11	Jackson, Malik	LB	4	28	3 (3)	0
93	Johnson, Micah	DE	4	25	12 (12)	0
69	Jones, Brett	OL	2	21	18 (18)	1
49	Law, Cordarro	DL	1	24	16 (15)	1
90	Légaré, Étienne	DL	1	30	5 (0)	1
40	Lemon, Shawn	DE	2	24	6 (5)	1
82	Lewis, Nik	WR	11	31	7 (7)	0
36	Love, Glenn	LB	4	24	4 (0)	1
24	MacDougall, Keenan	DB	3	23	2 (0)	0
99	Mace, Corey	DL	5	27	1 (1)	0
6	Maver, Rob	K, P	8	27	18 (0)	0
42	Mayo, Deron	LB	6	25	18 (0)	1
45	McCartney, Karl	LB	6	25	10 (0)	0
16	McDaniel, Marquay	WR	6	29	18 (18)	0
19	Mitchell, Bo Levi	QB	6	23	18 (3)	1
31	Morley, Demetrice	DB	3	25	6 (3)	0
59	Myddelton, Steve	OL	4	26	1 (0)	0
30	Paredes, Rene	K	7	28	18 (0)	1
86	Parker, Anthony	WR	7	23	17 (0)	1
57	Peach, Billy	LB	1	23	3 (0)	0
--	Perrilloux, Ryan	QB	--	26	0 (0)	0
44	Phillips, Justin	DL	7	28	17 (0)	1
17	Price, Maurice	WR	3	27	13 (13)	1
33	Randle, Chris	DB	2	25	16 (16)	1
25	Raymond, Keon	DB	7	30	15 (15)	1
12	Simpson, Juwan	LB	6	28	18 (18)	1
3	Sinopoli, Brad	WR	4	25	14 (6)	1
28	Smith, Brandon	DB	9	28	16 (16)	1
43	Smith, Clifton	RB	1	27	2 (0)	0
88	Stafford, Kenny	WR	1	23	4 (2)	0
35	St. Pierre, Tim	LB	4	27	15 (2)	1
4	Tate, Drew	QB	8	28	18 (2)	1
2	Taylor, Larry	WR	3	28	16 (0)	1
67	Tsoumpas, Dimitri	OL	6	27	6 (6)	0
23	Turner, Junior	DL	4	24	13 (0)	1
29	Wall, Jamar	DB	6	25	12 (10)	1
14	Walter, Matt	RB	4	23	17 (1)	1
85	West, Joe	WR	5	29	6 (6)	1
50	Wilson, Spencer	OL	7	25	12 (8)	1

† – Age as of at the start of 2013 season (June 27, 2013).

*GP - Games Played

*GS - Games Started

=== Coaching staff ===
- John Hufnagel (Head Coach)
- Rick Campbell (Assistant Coach)

== Postseason ==
=== Schedule ===
Week	Game	Date	Time	Opponent	Score	Result	Attendance
20	West Semi-Final	Bye					
21	West Final	Nov 17	2:30 PM MST	vs. Saskatchewan Roughriders	35–13	Loss	33,174

=== Game summaries ===
==== West Final: vs Saskatchewan Roughriders ====
West Final: Saskatchewan Roughriders at Calgary Stampeders – Game summary

Quarter	1	2	3	4	Total
Roughriders	7	15	0	13	35
Stampeders	7	0	6	0	13

at McMahon Stadium, Calgary, Alberta

- Date: November 17
- Game time: 2:30 p.m. MST
- Game weather: Clear; −11 °C; wind 20 km/h
- Game attendance: 33,174
- Referee: Kim Murphy
- TV announcers (TSN/RDS/NBCSN): Chris Cuthbert (Play by Play), Glen Suitor (Colour), Jermaine Franklin (Sideline), Farhan Lalji (Sideline)
- Recap, Stats

Game information

Top passers

- SSK – Darian Durant (24-30, 280 yards, 3 TD, 0 INT)
- CGY – Drew Tate (7-13, 185 yards, 0 TD, 2 INT)

Top rushers

- SSK – Kory Sheets (28 rushes, 177 yards, 1 TD)
- CGY – Jon Cornish (9 rushes, 67 yards, 0 TD)

Top receivers

- SSK – Weston Dressler (5 rec, 116 yards, 1 TD)
- CGY – Joe West (3 rec, 101 yards, 1 TD)

Top tacklers

- SSK – Jermaine McElveen (5)
- CGY – Deron Mayo (14)
