= 2013 Toronto Argonauts season =

CFL team season

- General manager: Jim Barker
- Head coach: Scott Milanovich
- Home stadium: Rogers Centre

Results
- Record: 11–7
- Division place: 1st, East
- Playoffs: Lost East Final
- Team MOP: Ricky Ray
- Team MOC: Andre Durie
- Team MOR: John Chiles

Uniform

The 2013 Toronto Argonauts season was the 56th season for the team in the Canadian Football League (CFL) and their 141st season overall. The Argonauts finished in first place in the East Division with an 11–7 record, but their hopes of repeating their 2012 Grey Cup championship were ended by a 36–24 loss to the Hamilton Tiger-Cats in the East Final.

== Offseason ==
=== CFL draft ===
The 2013 CFL draft took place on May 6, 2013. The Argonauts had five selections in the seven-round draft, after trading their fourth round pick to the Hamilton Tiger-Cats and trading their third round pick to the Edmonton Eskimos for two fifth round picks. The club, in turn, traded three fifth round picks to Saskatchewan for a third round pick.

Round	Pick	Player	Position	School/Club team
1	8	Matt Sewell	OL	McMaster
2	17	Jermaine Gabriel	DB	Bishop's
3	22	Natey Adjei	WR	Buffalo
6	52	Michael Di Domenico	OL	Tarleton State
7	60	Paul Spencer	LB	Concordia

== Preseason ==
Week	Date	Opponent	Location	Final score	Attendance	Record
A	Wed, June 12	@ Blue Bombers	Investors Group Field	W 24–6	28,642	1–0
B	Thurs, June 20	Alouettes	Varsity Stadium	W 24–20	6,204	2–0

== Regular season ==
=== Standings ===
East Division
Team	GP	W	L	T	PF	PA	Pts	
Toronto Argonauts	18	11	7	0	507	458	22	Details
Hamilton Tiger-Cats	18	10	8	0	453	468	20	Details
Montreal Alouettes	18	8	10	0	459	471	16	Details
Winnipeg Blue Bombers	18	3	15	0	361	585	6	Details

=== Schedule ===
Win Loss Tie

Week	Date	Opponent	Location	Final score	Attendance	Record
1	Fri, June 28	Tiger-Cats	Rogers Centre	W 39–34	29,852	1–0
2	Thur, July 4	@ Lions	BC Place Stadium	L 24–16	25,255	1–1
3	Thur, July 11	Roughriders	Rogers Centre	L 39–28	18,211	1–2
4	Fri, July 19	@ Blue Bombers	Investors Group Field	W 35–19	31,257	2–2
5	Tue, July 30	Lions	Rogers Centre	W 38–12	20,064	3–2
6	Bye					3–2
7	Thur, Aug 8	@ Alouettes	Molson Stadium	W 38–13	22,068	4–2
8	Sun, Aug 18	Eskimos	Rogers Centre	W 36–33	19,656	5–2
9	Fri, Aug 23	Stampeders	Rogers Centre	L 35–14	21,157	5–3
10	Tue, Sept 3	Alouettes	Rogers Centre	L 20–9	18,863	5–4
11	Sun, Sept 8	@ Alouettes	Molson Stadium	W 37–30	23,911	6–4
12	Sat, Sept 14	@ Roughriders	Mosaic Stadium	W 31–29	36,703	7–4
13	Sat, Sept 21	@ Stampeders	McMahon Stadium	W 33–27	28,781	8–4
14	Sat, Sept 28	@ Eskimos	Commonwealth Stadium	W 34–22	29,569	9–4
15	Fri, Oct 4	Tiger-Cats	Rogers Centre	L 33–19	28,467	9–5
16	Mon, Oct 14	@ Tiger-Cats	Alumni Stadium	L 24–18	13,362	9–6
17	Sat, Oct 19	@ Blue Bombers	Investors Group Field	W 26–20	28,869	10–6
18	Thur, Oct 24	Blue Bombers	Rogers Centre	W 36–21	18,478	11–6
19	Fri, Nov 1	Alouettes	Rogers Centre	L 23–20	22,589	11–7

== Postseason ==
=== Schedule ===
Round	Date	Opponent	Location	Final score	Attendance
First Round Bye	-	-	-	-	-
East Final	November 17	Tiger-Cats	Rogers Centre	L 36-24	35,418

=== Playoff bracket ===
November 10: Division Semi-Finals
East
E3	Montreal Alouettes	16
E2	Hamilton Tiger-Cats	19*
West
W3	BC Lions	25
W2	Saskatchewan Roughriders	29

November 17: Division Finals
E2	Hamilton Tiger-Cats	36
E1	Toronto Argonauts	24
W2	Saskatchewan Roughriders	35
W1	Calgary Stampeders	13

November 24: 101st Grey Cup; Mosaic Stadium at Taylor Field – Regina
E2	Hamilton Tiger-Cats	23
W2	Saskatchewan Roughriders	45

*-Team won in Overtime.

== Roster ==
2013 Toronto Argonauts final roster
Quarterbacks: 17 Zach Collaros; 7 Trevor Harris; 15 Ricky Ray; Running backs: 33 Jeff Johnson; 34 Jerious Norwood; 29 Curtis Steele; 35 Anthony Woodson; Receivers: 81 Jason Barnes; 88 Mike Bradwell; 85 John Chiles; 32 Andre Durie; 11 Dontrelle Inman; 2 Chad Owens; 87 Zander Robinson; 89 Spencer Watt	Offensive linemen: 59 Joe Eppele G; 57 Tyler Holmes G/T; 64 Andrew Jones G; 63 Kyle Koch C; 52 Wayne Smith G; 54 Chris Van Zeyl T/G; 65 Tony Washington T; Defensive linemen: 97 Ivan Brown DE; 90 Cleyon Laing DT; 91 David Lee DE; 56 Aaron Maybin DE; 96 Khalif Mitchell DT; 79 Marcus Thomas DT; 75 Jonathan Williams DT/DE	Linebackers: 6 Marcus Ball; 41 Jonathan Hood; 27 Shane Horton; 40 Herve Tonye-Tonye; 47 James Yurichuk; Defensive backs: 39 Matt Black; 5 Jermaine Gabriel; 24 Alonzo Lawrence; 12 Demetrice Morley; 4 Jamie Robinson; 10 Neiko Thorpe; 25 Pat Watkins	Special teams: 82 Chad Rempel LS; 30 Swayze Waters K/P; Reserve roster: 80 Romby Bryant WR; 67 Jeff Keeping C; 46 Jason Pottinger LB; Practice roster: 20 Major Culbert LB; 83 Julian Feoli-Gudino SB; 86 Trent Guy SB; 84 Ezra Millington WR; 37 Lance Milton DB; 38 Branden Smith DB	Injured List: 21 Antareis Bryan DB; 19 Jalil Carter DB; 28 Ricardo Colclough DB; 16 Mitchell Gale QB; 8 Shane Herbert DB; 44 Chad Kackert RB; 61 Jarriel King T; 45 Robert McCune LB; 3 Josh Portis QB; 1 Noel Prefontaine K/P; 66 SirVincent Rogers G; 92 Kiante Tripp DT; Suspended: 9 Darvin Adams SB; Italics indicates American player
