= Shawn Lemon =

American gridiron football player (born 1988)

- Lemon with the Toronto Argonauts in 2026

No. 48, 79, 40, 52, 8, 9, 0, 42
- Position: Defensive lineman

Personal information
- Born: August 25, 1988 (age 38); Charleston, South Carolina, U.S.
- Listed height: 6 ft 2 in (1.88 m)
- Listed weight: 242 lb (110 kg)

Career information
- High school: Westlake (Waldorf, Maryland)
- College: Akron (2007–2010)
- NFL draft: 2011: undrafted

Career history
- Winnipeg Blue Bombers (2011)*; Saskatchewan Roughriders (2011); San Jose SaberCats (2012); Orlando Predators (2012); Sioux Falls Storm (2012); Edmonton Eskimos (2012); Calgary Stampeders (2013–2014); Pittsburgh Steelers (2015)*; San Francisco 49ers (2015)*; Ottawa Redblacks (2015); Saskatchewan Roughriders (2016); Toronto Argonauts (2016–2018); BC Lions (2018); Toronto Argonauts (2019); BC Lions (2019); Edmonton Elks (2021)*; Calgary Stampeders (2021–2022); BC Lions (2023)*; Montreal Alouettes (2023–2025); Toronto Argonauts (2026)
- * Offseason or practice squad member only

Awards and highlights
- 3× Grey Cup champion (2014, 2017, 2023); Norm Fieldgate Trophy (2022); CFL All-Star (2022); 2x CFL East All-Star (2016, 2026); CFL West All-Star (2022)

Career CFL statistics
- Tackles: 289
- Sacks: 112
- Forced fumbles: 32
- Interceptions: 3
- Stats at CFL.ca
- Stats at Pro Football Reference

Shawn Lemon (born August 25, 1988) is an American former professional football defensive lineman who played for 15 seasons in the Canadian Football League (CFL). Lemon is a three-time Grey Cup champion and won the Norm Fieldgate Trophy as the best defensive player in the West Division in 2022. He is also a three-time divisional CFL All-Star was named a CFL All-Star in 2022. Lemon is a color commentator for the CFL on DAZN.

Lemon has been a member of eight CFL teams (Winnipeg Blue Bombers, Saskatchewan Roughriders, Edmonton Eskimos / Elks, Calgary Stampeders, Ottawa Redblacks, Toronto Argonauts, BC Lions, Montreal Alouettes), three indoor football teams (San Jose SaberCats, Orlando Predators, Sioux Falls Storm) and two NFL teams (Pittsburgh Steelers, San Francisco 49ers). He played college football at Akron.

In 2024, he was suspended indefinitely by the CFL for betting on league games, but was reinstated on July 16, 2025.

== Early life ==
Lemon was born on August 25, 1988, in Charleston, South Carolina. His family moved to Waldorf, Maryland and he participated in football, basketball and track and field for the Westlake High School Wolverines. He broke the single-season at Westlake and the Southern Maryland Athletic Conference record with 21 sacks. Lemon recorded 97 tackles as a senior and was named first team All-Metro. He was also named to the Maryland Big School All-State second team. He accrued 80 tackles, 16 sacks, and two interceptions as a junior in 2004, being named second team All-Metro.

== College career ==
Lemon played college football for the Akron Zips of the University of Akron from 2007 to 2010. He was an All-Mid-American Conference selection as a senior, leading the team with seven sacks and four fumble recoveries. He ended his college career with 102 tackles, 23 tackles for loss, 11 sacks, five fumble recoveries and six forced fumbles. Lemon was teammates with his brother Marcus Lemon for two years at Akron. Lemon was also teammates all four years at Akron with fellow longtime CFL defensive lineman Almondo Sewell.

== Professional career ==
=== Winnipeg Blue Bombers ===
On July 18, 2011, Lemon was signed to the practice roster of the Winnipeg Blue Bombers of the CFL. He was released by the Blue Bombers on July 21, 2011.

=== Saskatchewan Roughriders (first stint) ===
Lemon signed with the CFL's Saskatchewan Roughriders on August 10, 2011. He made his CFL debut on September 11, 2011, against the Winnipeg Blue Bombers. He was released by the Roughriders on September 21, 2011.

=== San Jose SaberCats ===
Lemon was assigned to the San Jose SaberCats of the Arena Football League (AFL) on March 11, 2012.

=== Orlando Predators ===
Lemon was traded to the Orlando Predators on April 18, 2012. He was reassigned by the Predators on May 8, 2012.

=== Sioux Falls Storm ===
Lemon signed with the Sioux Falls Storm of the Indoor Football League after his release from the Predators.

=== Edmonton Eskimos (first stint) ===
Lemon spent the 2012 season with the Edmonton Eskimos of the CFL. He was released by Edmonton on May 22, 2013.

=== Calgary Stampeders (first stint) ===
Lemon signed with the Calgary Stampeders of the CFL on June 2, 2013. He played six games in 2013, recording 18 tackles, three quarterback sacks and a fumble recovery. He was on the reserve list for twelve games. Lemon recorded six tackles in the Western Final. He started all 18 games for the Stampeders in 2014, recording 13 sacks, five tackles for a loss and eight forced fumbles (CFL League Record) . He also totaled 31 tackles, a special-teams tackle and an interception. Lemon was named the Defensive Player of the Week for Week 15 when he recorded three tackles, a pair of sacks and a forced fumble in a victory over the Saskatchewan Roughriders. The Stampeders won the 102nd Grey Cup against the Hamilton Tiger-Cats on November 30, 2014. On January 19, 2015, the Stampeders released Lemon, allowing him to become a free-agent and pursue employment opportunities in the NFL.

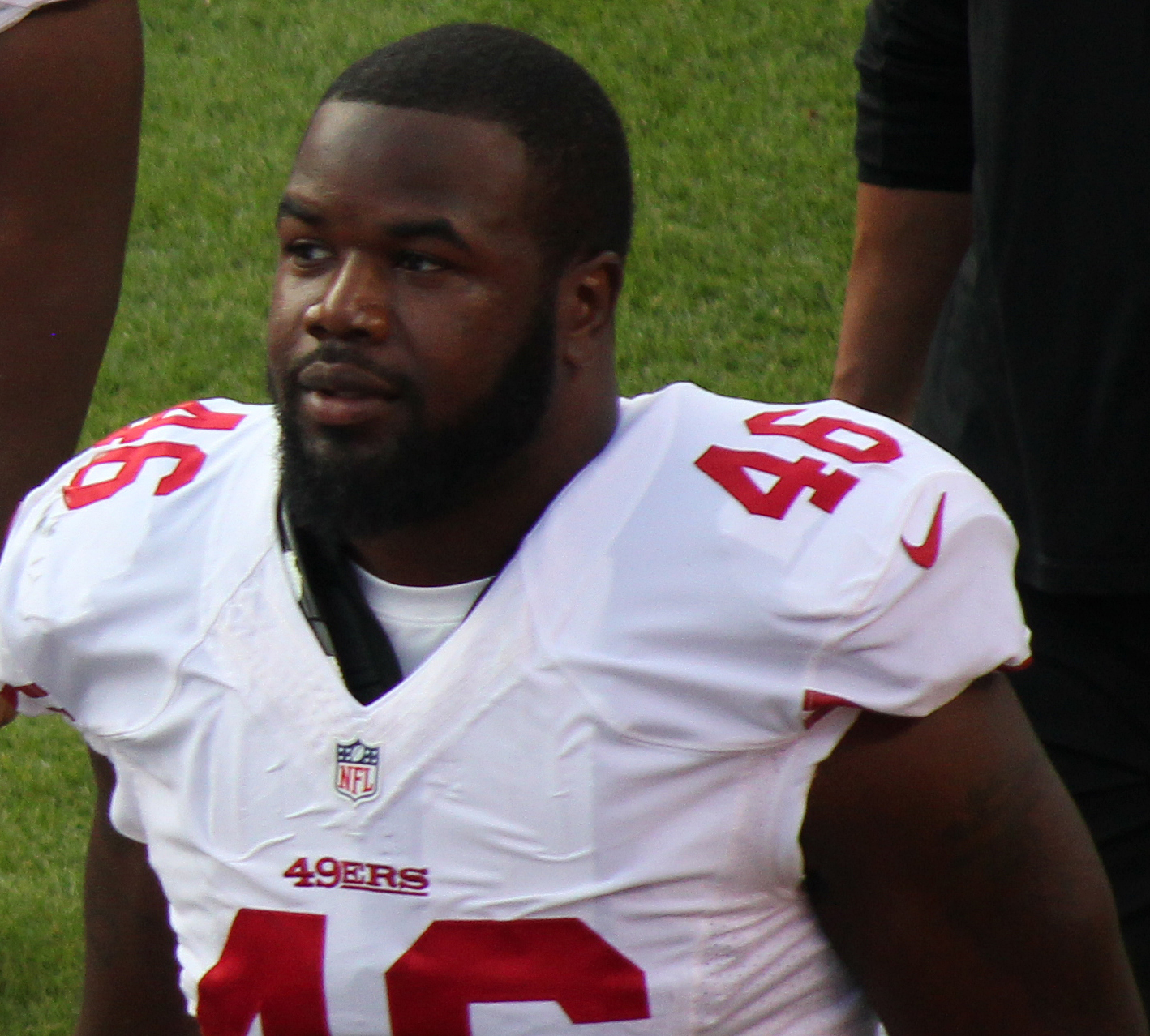
Lemon with the San Francisco 49ers in 2015

=== Pittsburgh Steelers ===
Lemon agreed to a contract with the Pittsburgh Steelers of the National Football League (NFL) on January 20, 2015. He was released by the Steelers on August 3, 2015.

=== San Francisco 49ers ===
Lemon was signed by the NFL's San Francisco 49ers on August 8, 2015. He was released by the 49ers on August 31, 2015. He was listed as a linebacker during his time with the Steelers and 49ers.

=== Ottawa Redblacks ===
On September 3, 2015, Lemon signed with the Ottawa Redblacks of the CFL to play as a defensive end for Ottawa. Lemon played in the last half of the season with the Redblacks, contributing five quarterback sacks during the regular season. He was released by the Redblacks on December 4 so he could pursue NFL opportunities.

=== Saskatchewan Roughriders (second stint) ===
Lemon was signed by the Roughriders on January 15, 2016. Lemon was listed as the third-string defensive end for opening night, effectively confirming rumours that Lemon was unhappy with the Roughriders coaching staff. Following a week 1 defeat Lemon asked to be traded.

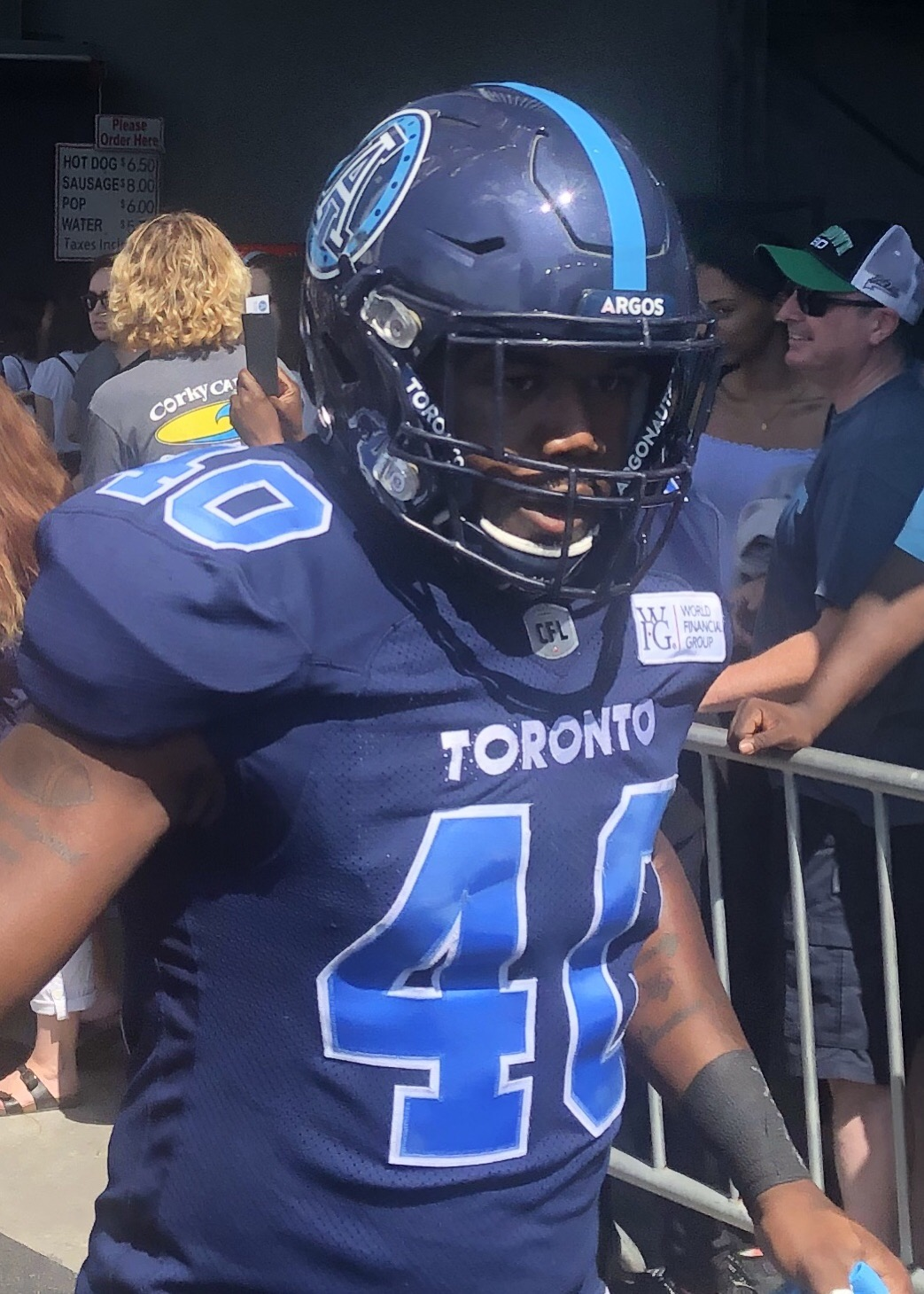
Lemon with the Toronto Argonauts in 2019

=== Toronto Argonauts (first stint) ===
After reports that Lemon was not happy in Saskatchewan, Lemon was traded to the Toronto Argonauts on July 2, 2016, after playing limited reps in only one game for the Roughriders. Lemon and a conditional 2018 CFL draft pick were sent to the Argonauts in exchange for Mitchell Gale and Matt Sewell. Lemon played in 16 games for the Argos during the 2016 season and finished tied for second in the CFL with 14 sacks. He was recognized by his peers for his performance and was named a CFL East Division All-Star. On December 1, 2016, Lemon and the Argos agreed on a contract extension which kept him with the 'double-blue' through the 2018 CFL season. Lemon was hampered by injury during 2017, and was the only starter on Toronto's defensive line not to make the CFL East All Stars list (Victor Butler, Dylan Wynn, and Cleyon Laing all made the list), but Lemon still managed 8 sacks and a forced fumble in 12 games played. During the playoffs, Lemon recorded 3 sacks in a victory over the Saskatchewan Roughriders. Lemon and the Argos would go on to defeat Lemon's former team, the Stampeders to win the 105th Grey Cup. Lemon played in 5 games for Toronto in 2018, before being traded away. In those games he made 5 tackles, one sack, and one forced fumble.

=== BC Lions (first stint) ===
On July 24, 2018, Lemon was traded to the BC Lions for a negotiation list player. Lemon formed a formidable pass rush tandem with Odell Willis, and went on to record 10 sacks in 13 games for BC, including two against Toronto in two meetings later that season.

=== Toronto Argonauts (second stint) ===
After becoming a free agent in February 2019, Lemon signed with Toronto again on a one-year contract. Lemon played in four games for the Argos in 2019, contributing 15 tackles and one quarterback sack.

=== BC Lions (second stint) ===
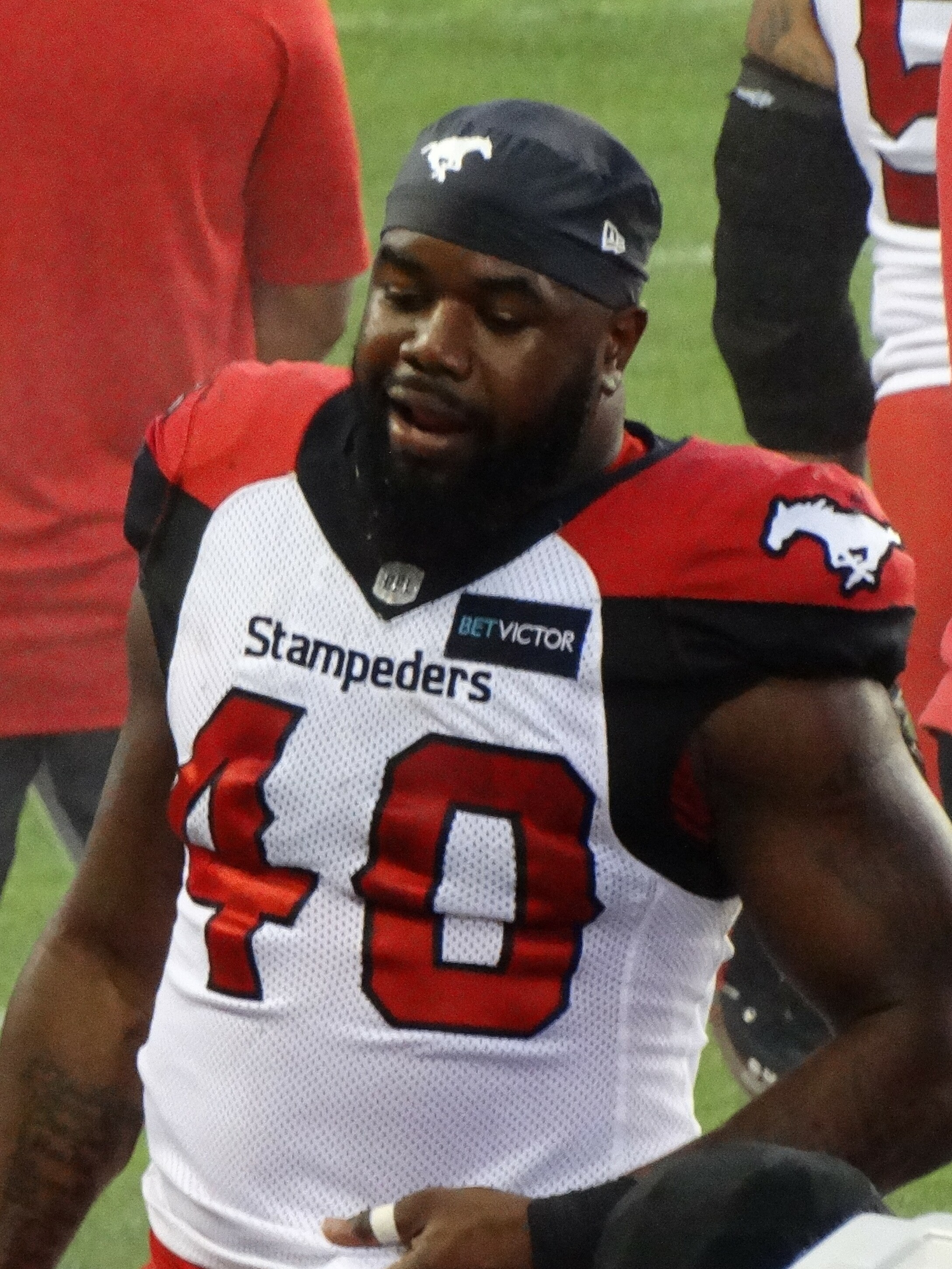
Lemon with the Calgary Stampeders in 2022

On August 12, 2019, for the second time in his career, Lemon was traded from Toronto to BC in the middle of the season, this time for Davon Coleman. Lemon's first game back with the Lions saw him record 2 sacks and force a fumble, while also inflicting a season ending injury upon Winnipeg quarterback Matt Nichols. Lemon recorded 8 sacks in 10 games with the Lions. Lemon was not re-signed by the Lions following the 2019 season and became a free agent on February 11, 2020. The 2020 CFL season was cancelled due to the COVID-19 pandemic.

=== Edmonton Football Team / Elks (second stint) ===
On February 3, 2021, Lemon signed a one-year deal with the Edmonton Football Team (later renamed the Elks). However, he was released near the end of training camp on July 29, 2021.

=== Calgary Stampeders (second stint) ===
On July 30, 2021, it was announced that Lemon had signed with the Stampeders. Lemon continued his stellar play in the 2021 and 2022 seasons playing in 28 games for the Stamps, and posting 55 defensive tackles, 22 quarterback sacks, and seven forced fumbles. He was named a CFL All-Star following the 2022 season, his first such honour. He was also named the winner of the Norm Fieldgate Trophy, which is awarded to the most outstanding defensive player in the West Division. Following the season Lemon was not re-signed by the Stampeders and became a free agent on February 14, 2023.

=== BC Lions (third stint) ===
On February 26, 2023, Lemon signed again with the Lions. Lemon was released by the Lions during training camp on May 22, 2023.

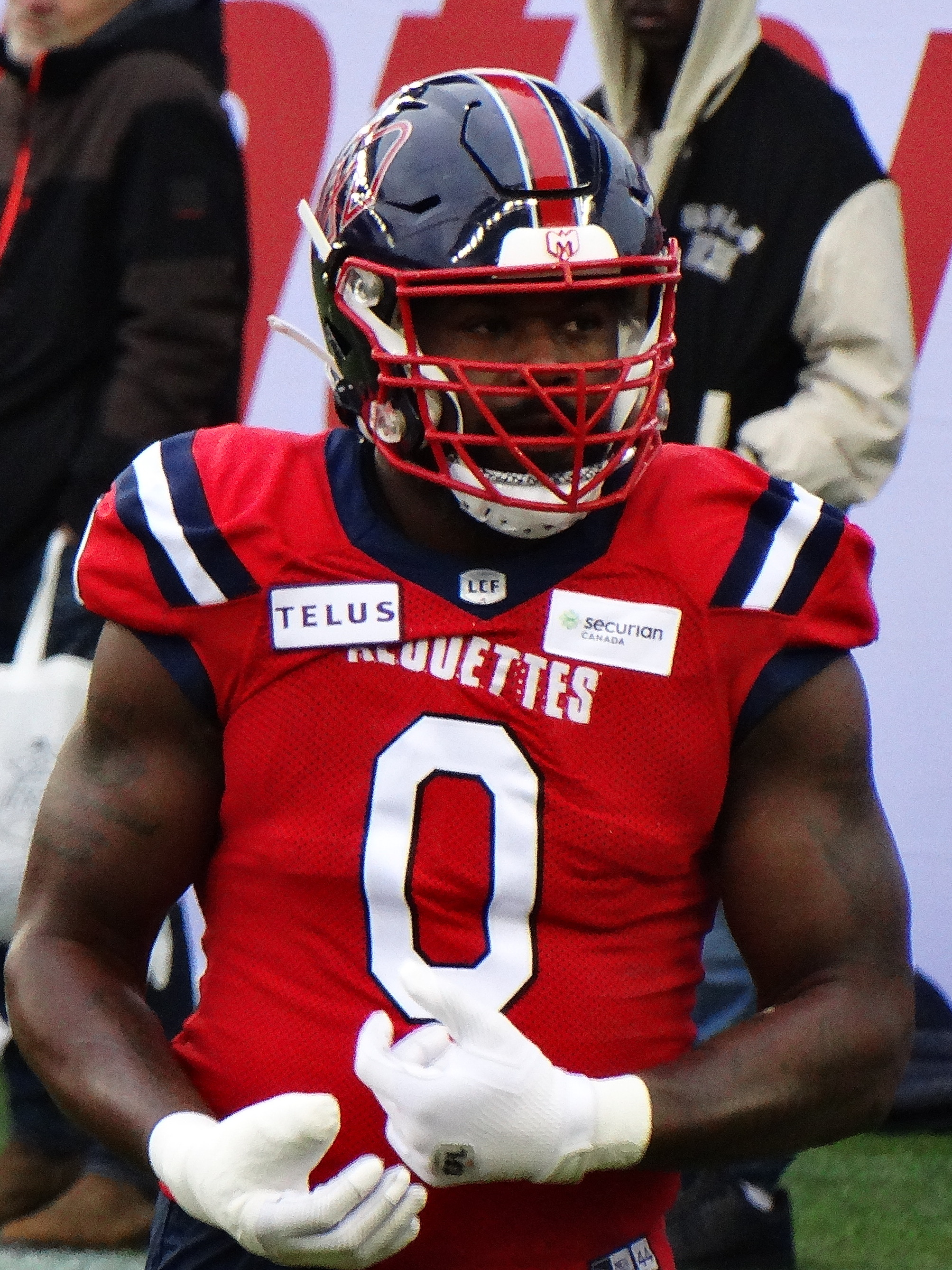
Lemon with the Montreal Alouettes in 2023

=== Montreal Alouettes ===
On July 23, 2023, Lemon signed with the Montreal Alouettes. On September 30, 2023, he scored the first touchdown of his career as he returned a fumble 30 yards for the score in the game against the Ottawa Redblacks. The following week, he recorded the 100th sack of his career, on October 9, 2023, also against the Redblacks, as he sacked Dustin Crum. Overall, he played in just 13 games, but recorded nine sacks, two interceptions, one forced fumble, and one touchdown. In the team's two playoff games, Lemon recorded seven defensive tackles, three sacks, and one fumble recovery as the team advanced to the 110th Grey Cup game. He had three defensive tackles and one sack in that game as the Alouettes defeated the Winnipeg Blue Bombers and Lemon won his third Grey Cup championship. On December 7, 2023, Lemon signed a one-year contract extension with the Alouettes. He announced his retirement on April 10, 2024.

Shortly thereafter, on April 24, 2024, the CFL announced that Lemon had been suspended indefinitely for betting on league games while a member of the Stampeders in 2021. Lemon then unretired, launched an appeal, and returned to the Alouettes. He was allowed to take place in team activities and play in games for the Alouettes until an arbitrator made a decision. He made the opening day roster and played in four games for the Alouettes, recording six defensive tackles and one sack. On July 4, 2024, an independent arbitrator ruled that his suspension would go into effect immediately. He was on the Alouettes' suspended list for the remainder of the season and became a free agent upon the expiry of his contract on February 11, 2025.

On July 16, 2025, the league announced that Lemon had been conditionally reinstated and was eligible to sign with any team. As part of the reinstatement, he was required to complete mandatory league education and continue to participate in counselling sessions. Upon being signed by a team, Lemon would still be required to serve his two-game suspension for violating the CFL and CFL Players' Association’s joint drug policy, following his positive test for the banned substance Phentermine. On July 17, 2025, it was announced that Lemon had been signed by the Alouettes prior to the team's game that evening against the Argonauts which allowed him to serve his suspension.

He became a free agent upon the expiry of his contract on February 10, 2026.

=== Toronto Argonauts (third stint) ===
On July 21, 2026, it was announced that Lemon had signed with the Argonauts. He played in 11 regular season games where he had 19 defensive tackles, nine sacks, two forced fumbles, and one pass knockdown. He retired shortly after season's end to become a broadcaster.

== Post-retirement activities ==
On November 12, 2026, it was announced that Lemon had been hired by DAZN to serve as a color commentator for the streaming service's Saturday night games.

== CFL statistics ==
Year	Team	GP	DT	ST	Sacks	INT	TD	FF
2011	SSK	1	0	0	0	0	0	0
2012	EDM	12	15	0	6	0	0	1
2013	CGY	6	17	0	3	0	0	0
2014	CGY	18	26	1	13	1	0	8
2015	OTT	9	13	0	6	0	0	3
2016	SSK	1	0	0	0	0	0	1
2016	TOR	16	22	0	14	0	0	4
2017	TOR	12	18	0	8	0	0	1
2018	TOR	5	5	0	1	0	0	1
2018	BC	13	16	1	10	0	0	0
2019	TOR	4	15	0	1	0	0	0
2019	BC	10	19	0	8	0	0	3
2020	Season cancelled							
2021	CGY	11	26	0	8	0	0	2
2022	CGY	17	29	0	14	0	0	5
2023	MTL	13	26	0	9	2	1	1
2024	MTL	4	6	0	1	0	0	0
2025	MTL	5	7	0	1	0	0	0
TOTAL		157	270	2	103	3	1	30
