= Brander Craighead =

Canadian football player (born 1990)

No. 58
- Position: Offensive lineman

Personal information
- Born: September 8, 1990 (age 36); Belleville, Ontario, Canada
- Listed height: 6 ft 7 in (2.01 m)
- Listed weight: 300 lb (136 kg)

Career information
- High school: Nepean (ON) Mother Teresa
- College: UTEP
- CFL draft: 2013: 1st round, 7th overall pick

Career history
- 2014–2015: Calgary Stampeders

Awards and highlights
- Grey Cup champion (2014)
- Stats at CFL.ca

Brander Craighead (born September 8, 1990) is a Canadian former professional football offensive lineman who played two seasons for the Calgary Stampeders of the Canadian Football League (CFL). He was selected by the Stampeders in the first round of the 2013 CFL draft after playing college football at the University of Texas at El Paso.

== Early life ==
Craighead played lacrosse at Mother Teresa High School in Nepean, Ontario. The Titan's did not have a football team. He also played city league football for the Nepean Redskins for ten years.

== College career ==
Craighead spent the 2008 season playing football for the Fork Union Military Academy Blue Devils. He transferred to play football for the UTEP Miners.

== Professional career ==
Craighead was selected by the Calgary Stampeders of the CFL with the seventh pick in the 2013 CFL draft. He signed with the Stampeders on December 17, 2013. He was also rated the 60th best offensive tackle in the 2014 NFL draft by NFLDraftScout.com. Craighead was made his CFL debut, starting against the Montreal Alouettes, on June 28, 2014. He retired in January 2016.
