= Stefan Charles =

Canadian gridiron football player (born 1988)

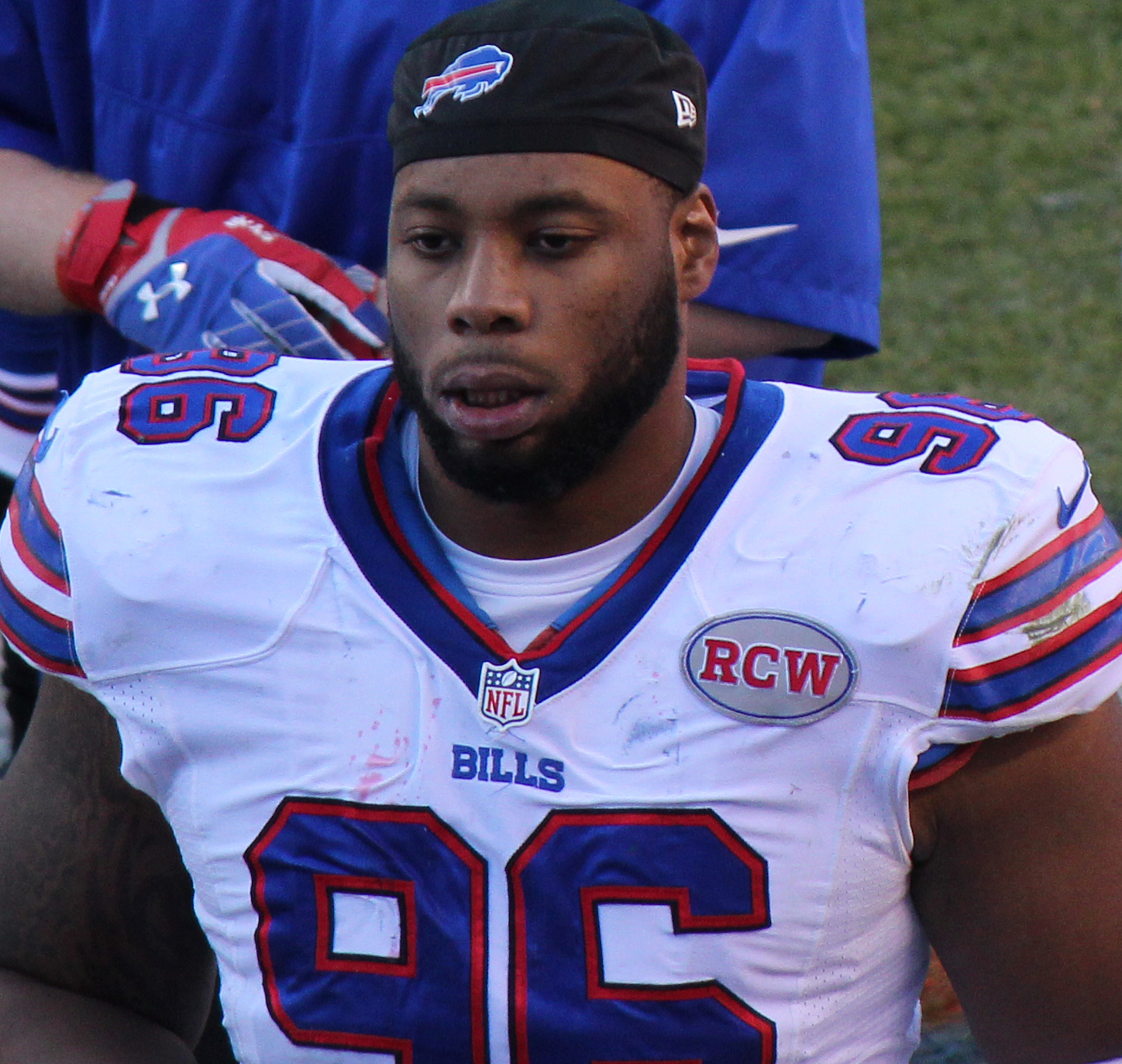
- Charles with the Buffalo Bills in 2014

Profile
- Position: Defensive tackle

Personal information
- Born: June 9, 1988 (age 38); Oshawa, Ontario, Canada
- Listed height: 6 ft 5 in (1.96 m)
- Listed weight: 323 lb (147 kg)

Career information
- High school: Eastdale CVI (Oshawa)
- University: Regina
- NFL draft: 2013: undrafted
- CFL draft: 2013: 2nd round, 10th overall pick

Career history
- Tennessee Titans (2013)*; Buffalo Bills (2013–2015); Detroit Lions (2016); Jacksonville Jaguars (2017)*; Kansas City Chiefs (2017–2018); San Antonio Commanders (2019); Atlanta Falcons (2019)*; Edmonton Eskimos (2019–2020); Ottawa Redblacks (2021); Edmonton Elks (2022)*
- * Offseason or practice squad member only

Career NFL statistics
- Total tackles: 60
- Sacks: 5.0
- Forced fumbles: 2
- Fumble recoveries: 1
- Stats at Pro Football Reference
- Stats at CFL.ca

Stefan Charles (born June 9, 1988) is a Canadian former professional football player who was a defensive tackle in the National Football League (NFL) and Canadian Football League (CFL). He played CIS football for the Regina Rams. He was selected by the Edmonton Eskimos with the 10th overall draft pick of the 2013 CFL draft.

== University career ==
Charles played three seasons of CIS football with the Regina Rams. In 22 career games at Regina, he posted 19.5 tackles for losses, 9.5 sacks and 50 tackles. An injury to his hand caused him to miss much of his 4th season with the Rams. Prior to joining the Regina Rams, he was a member of the Metro Toronto Wildcats of the OVFL.

== Professional career ==
=== CFL draft ===
Charles was ranked No. 1 overall in the Canadian Football League Scouting Bureau's September rankings heading into the 2013 CFL draft. He fell to 4th place in the December rankings. Following the 2012 CIS season, Charles was invited to the 2013 CFL Evaluation Camp in late-March 2013. After a successful CFL Combine, Charles climbed to become the 2nd ranked Canadian football prospect heading into the 2013 Draft. Charles was drafted by the Edmonton Eskimos with the 10th overall pick in the 2013 CFL Draft.

=== NFL draft ===
Prior to the 2013 NFL draft Charles gained interest from the following teams; Seattle Seahawks, Tennessee Titans, Indianapolis Colts, Houston Texans, Pittsburgh Steelers, Jacksonville Jaguars, Dallas Cowboys, and Atlanta Falcons. He also participated in the regional NFL Combine in Dallas, in April 2013. Despite the interest, Charles was not drafted by any team in the 2013 NFL draft.

=== Tennessee Titans ===
Following the draft, Charles signed with the Tennessee Titans on May 9, 2013. He was waived on August 31, 2013, and was signed to the practice squad.

=== Buffalo Bills ===
On October 30, 2013, Charles was signed by the Buffalo Bills off the Titans' practice squad.

During the 2015 season, he appeared in 13 games (one start) for the Bills, racking up 13 total tackles (nine solo), one sack and one forced fumble.

=== Detroit Lions ===
On March 11, 2016, the Detroit Lions signed Charles to a one-year contract. He was placed on injured reserve on December 28, 2016.

=== Jacksonville Jaguars ===
On March 11, 2017, Charles signed with the Jacksonville Jaguars. He was released on September 3, 2017.

=== Kansas City Chiefs ===
On January 3, 2018, Charles signed a one-year contract with the Kansas City Chiefs. He was re-signed on March 19, 2018. He was released on May 8, 2018, but was re-signed two days later. He was released again on September 1, 2018.

=== San Antonio Commanders ===
On February 19, 2019, Charles signed with the San Antonio Commanders of the AAF. He was waived on March 12, 2019.

=== Atlanta Falcons ===
On August 24, 2019, Charles was signed by the Atlanta Falcons. He was released on August 31, 2019.

=== Edmonton Eskimos ===
On September 16, 2019, Charles signed with the Edmonton Eskimos of the Canadian Football League (CFL). The Eskimos had retained his playing rights after drafting him in the 2013 CFL draft. He was placed on the practice roster for the duration of the regular season until he was moved to reserve roster for the East Semi-Final. He was then placed on the injured list for the team's East Final loss to the Hamilton Tiger-Cats and did not dress for a game in 2019. He did not play in 2020 due to the cancellation of the 2020 CFL season.

=== Ottawa Redblacks ===
On February 9, 2021, Charles signed with the Ottawa Redblacks.

=== Edmonton Elks ===
Charles returned to the Edmonton Elks in free agency on February 9, 2022. However, he was released on May 16, 2022.
