= Andy Mulumba =

Congolese-Canadian gridiron football player (born 1990)

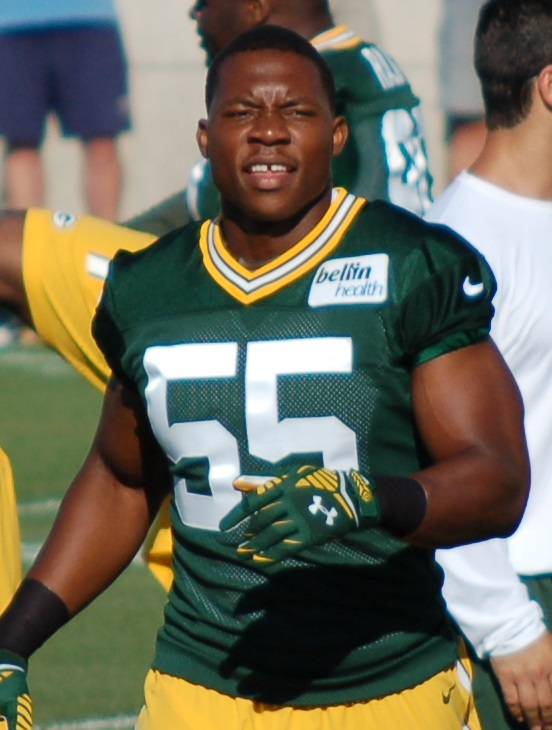
- Mulumba with the Green Bay Packers in 2015

No. 46, 55, 62, 40, 45, 49
- Position: Linebacker

Personal information
- Born: January 31, 1990 (age 36); Luputa, Lomami Province, Congo
- Listed height: 6 ft 3 in (1.91 m)
- Listed weight: 260 lb (118 kg)

Career information
- High school: Cégep du Vieux Montréal
- College: Eastern Michigan
- NFL draft: 2013: undrafted
- CFL draft: 2013: 1st round, 2nd overall pick

Career history
- Green Bay Packers (2013–2015); Kansas City Chiefs (2016)*; Oakland Raiders (2017)*; Los Angeles Rams (2017)*
- * Offseason or practice squad member only

Awards and highlights
- Second-team All-MAC (2012)

Career NFL statistics
- Tackles: 35
- Sacks: 1
- Interceptions: 0
- Stats at Pro Football Reference

Andy Leon Mulumba Kabaluapa (born January 31, 1990) is a Congolese-Canadian former professional football linebacker. He played college football for Eastern Michigan. He was selected by the Winnipeg Blue Bombers second overall in the 2013 CFL draft but subsequently signed with the Green Bay Packers as an undrafted free agent.

== Early life ==
Mulumba was born one of six children to parents Martin Kabaluapa and Madeleine Bipendu. He has three brothers and two sisters. Mulumba played football in Montreal, Quebec during which he played as a defensive lineman. For his role in the national championship victory, Mulumba was named the team's Defensive Most Valuable Player.

== College career ==
Mulumba joined the Eastern Michigan University football team, entering the 2009 season as a true freshman. He played in all 12 games after which Mulumba was one of nine players to earn a letter. Mulumba began as a linebacker before transitioning into the defensive line position by his sophomore season. While as a junior during the 2011 season, Mulumba was named to the Academic All-MAC Team. He also earned two letters during his first two seasons.

== Professional career ==
=== Green Bay Packers ===
After going undrafted in the 2013 NFL draft, Mulumba signed with the Green Bay Packers as an undrafted free agent May 10, 2013. On September 17, Mulumba was diagnosed with a torn ACL.

=== Kansas City Chiefs ===
On April 1, 2016, Mulumba signed with the Kansas City Chiefs. On September 3, 2016, he was released by the Chiefs.

=== Oakland Raiders ===
On January 2, 2017, Mulumba signed a futures contract with the Raiders. He was waived on July 7, 2017.

=== Los Angeles Rams ===
On July 27, 2017, Mulumba signed with the Los Angeles Rams. He was waived on September 2, 2017.

=== Statistics ===
==== Regular season ====
Season	Team	Games		Tackles				
Season	Team	GP	GS	Total	Solo	Ast	Sck	Int
2013	Green Bay Packers	14	3	33	16	17	1.0	0
2014	Green Bay Packers	2	0	1	1	0	0	0
2015	Green Bay Packers	6	0	2	1	1	0	0
	Total	22	3	36	18	18	1.0	0

==== Postseason ====
Season	Team	Games		Tackles				
Season	Team	GP	GS	Total	Solo	Ast	Sck	Int
2013	Green Bay Packers	1	1	2	1	1	0	0
2015	Green Bay Packers	1	0	1	0	1	0	0
	Total	2	1	3	1	2	0	0
