= Linden Gaydosh =

Canadian gridiron football player (born 1991)

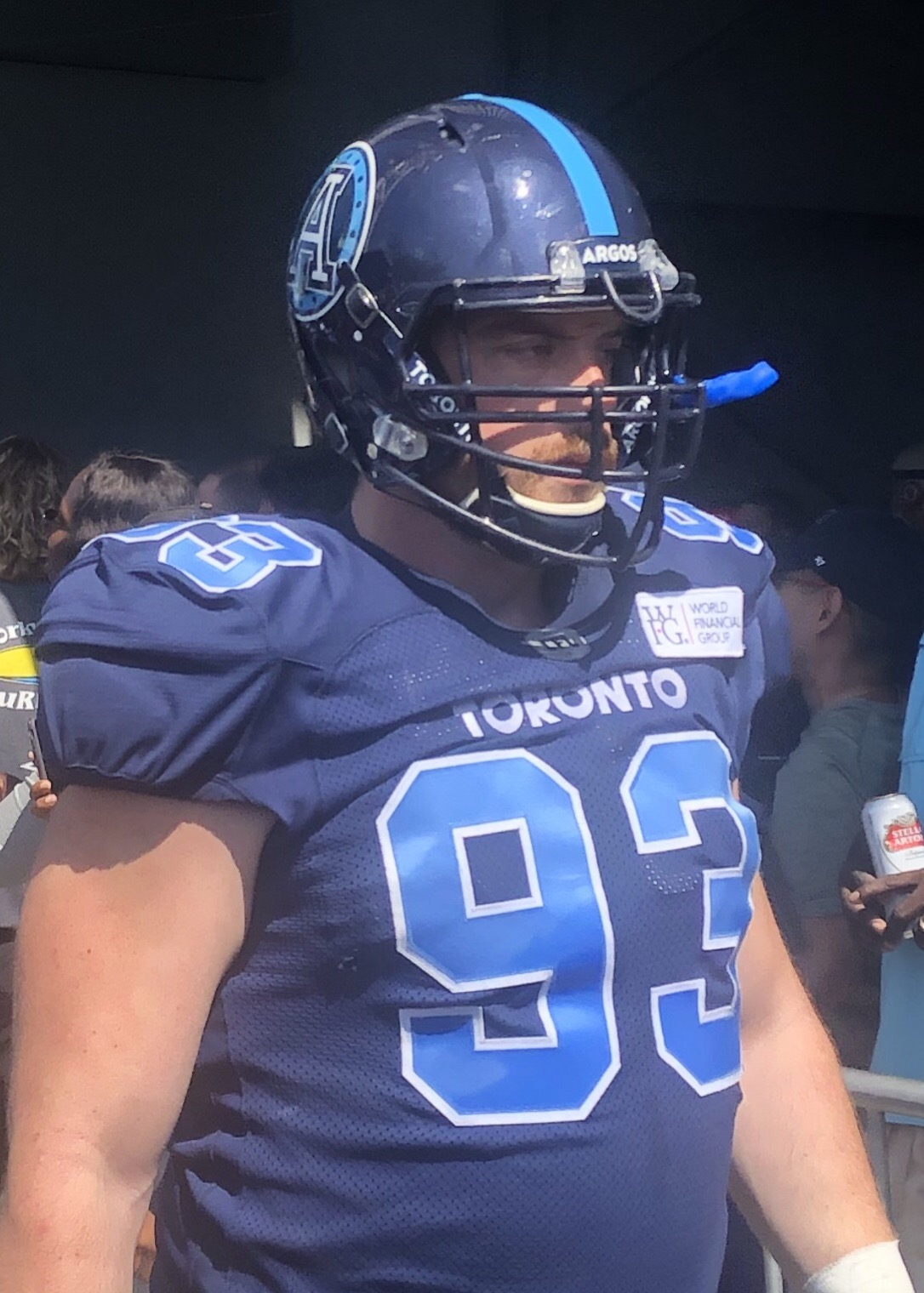
- Gaydosh with the Toronto Argonauts in 2019

Profile
- Position: Defensive tackle

Personal information
- Born: January 4, 1991 (age 35); Peace River, Alberta, Canada
- Listed height: 6 ft 4 in (1.93 m)
- Listed weight: 290 lb (132 kg)

Career information
- High school: Peace River (AB)
- University: Calgary
- CFL draft: 2013: 1st round, 1st overall pick

Career history
- Carolina Panthers (2013); Hamilton Tiger-Cats (2014–2016); Saskatchewan Roughriders (2016–2017); Toronto Argonauts (2017–2019)

Awards and highlights
- 2011 2nd team All-Canadian (CIS); 2011 Canada West all-star (CIS); 2010 Hardy Cup MVP (CIS); 2009 CIS Rookie of the Year (CIS); No. 3 on Scouting Bureau (2013 CFL draft)
- Stats at Pro Football Reference
- Stats at CFL.ca

Linden David Gaydosh (born January 4, 1991) is a Canadian former professional football defensive tackle who played in the Canadian Football League (CFL) for the Hamilton Tiger-Cats and Toronto Argonauts. He played CIS football with the Calgary Dinos. Gaydosh was drafted first overall by the Tiger-Cats in the 2013 CFL draft, but instead chose to sign with the Carolina Panthers.

== College career ==
Year	Team	Tackles	Sacks
2009	Calgary Dinos	10	0
2010	Calgary Dinos	30.5	1
2011	Calgary Dinos	38	4
2012	Calgary Dinos	12	1
Career totals		90.5	6

== Professional career ==
=== CFL draft ===
Gaydosh was ranked as the 2nd best player in the Canadian Football League's Amateur Scouting Bureau final rankings for players eligible in the 2013 CFL draft. He ranked 3rd best in both the December and April (final) rankings. Gaydosh had arguably the best performance of the 2013 CFL Combine. Duane Forde said that, "If rankings were based solely on the combine Linden Gaydosh would be the number one guy."

He was drafted by the Hamilton Tiger-Cats of the Canadian Football League, with the 1st pick of the 1st round (1st overall) in the 2013 CFL draft.

=== Carolina Panthers ===
On May 12, 2013, less than a week after being drafted into the CFL, Gaydosh signed with the Carolina Panthers of the National Football League. On August 2, 2013, Gaydosh was waived/injured by the Panthers due to a back injury. On August 3, 2013, Gaydosh cleared waivers and was placed on the injured reserve list. He spent the entire 2013 NFL season on the injured reserve. He was released by the Panthers on August 24, 2014; prior to the 2014 NFL season.

=== Hamilton Tiger-Cats ===
On September 4, 2014, Gaydosh signed with the Tiger-Cats (who still held his CFL rights). He appeared in nine regular-season games, registering four tackles, two tackles for a loss and a pass knockdown. He added four tackles in two playoff contests. During an off-season workout in the spring of 2015, Gaydosh tore his Achilles tendon, which required surgery and caused him to miss the 2015 season. He returned to Hamilton in 2016, making appearances in both pre-season games and the season opener against Toronto.

=== Saskatchewan Roughriders ===
On October 12, 2016, Gaydosh was traded to the Saskatchewan Roughriders, however he was released by the club on August 2, 2017 without ever dressing for a game.

=== Toronto Argonauts ===
On August 6, 2017, Gaydosh signed with the Toronto Argonauts. Gaydosh played in 11 games for the Argos during the 2017 season, recorded the first three sacks of his career, and went on to win the 105th Grey Cup. Gaydosh played in 14 games for the Argos in 2018, made 5 tackles and his first career special teams tackle, and was signed to a contract extension following the season. In 2019, Gaydosh continued his role as a depth player and situational pass rusher, but made a few splash plays with six tackles, a sack, and his first career interception. However, he was released on February 7, 2020.
