= Seydou Junior Haidara =

Canadian football player (born 1989)

No. 80
- Position: Wide receiver

Personal information
- Born: March 5, 1989 (age 37); Quebec City, Quebec, Canada
- Listed height: 6 ft 1 in (1.85 m)
- Listed weight: 215 lb (98 kg)

Career information
- University: Laval
- CFL draft: 2013: 2nd round, 12th overall pick

Career history
- 2013–2015: BC Lions
- 2015: Hamilton Tiger-Cats*
- 2015: Saskatchewan Roughriders
- 2016–2018: Montreal Alouettes
- * Offseason or practice squad member only

Awards and highlights
- Vanier Cup champion (2012)
- Stats at CFL.ca

Seydou Junior Haïdara (born March 5, 1989) is a Canadian former professional football wide receiver. After the 2012 CIS season, he was ranked as the 11th best player in the Canadian Football League’s Amateur Scouting Bureau final rankings for players eligible in the 2013 CFL draft, and seventh by players in Canadian Interuniversity Sport. He was drafted in the second round and 12th overall by the BC Lions in the 2013 CFL draft. He played CIS football with the Laval Rouge et Or.

== Professional career ==
=== BC Lions ===
Haïdara was drafted by the BC Lions of the Canadian Football League, with the 3rd pick of the 2nd round (12th overall) of the 2013 CFL draft. He was signed by the Lions on May 27, 2013.

=== Hamilton Tiger-Cats ===
Haïdara was traded to the Hamilton Tiger-Cats on May 6, 2015 in exchange for a fifth round pick in the 2015 CFL draft.

=== Saskatchewan Roughriders ===
On June 23, 2015, Haidara was added to the Saskatchewan Roughriders' practice roster. He dressed in nine games and registered eight catches for 58 yards. On June 13, 2016, Haidara was released.

=== Montreal Alouettes ===
On August 29, 2016, Haidara signed with the Montreal Alouettes. He retired on March 7, 2019.
