= Matt Vonk =

Canadian gridiron football player (born 1990)

Profile
- Position: Offensive lineman

Personal information
- Born: August 15, 1990 (age 36); Burlington, Ontario, Canada
- Listed height: 6 ft 4 in (1.93 m)
- Listed weight: 305 lb (138 kg)

Career information
- High school: Assumption Catholic Secondary School Burlington
- University: Waterloo; Wilfrid Laurier
- CFL draft: 2013: 5th round, 38th overall pick

Career history
- 2014–2016: Saskatchewan Roughriders
- 2017: Montreal Alouettes

Awards and highlights
- Marshall Bingeman Barrel Award
- Stats at CFL.ca

Matt Vonk (born August 15, 1990) is a Canadian former professional football offensive lineman who played in the Canadian Football League (CFL) for the Saskatchewan Roughriders and Montreal Alouettes. He was selected in the fifth round, 38th overall, by the Roughriders in the 2013 CFL draft and signed with the team on May 30, 2013. He played CIS football for the Waterloo Warriors and Wilfrid Laurier Golden Hawks.

== Professional career ==
=== Saskatchewan Roughriders ===
After being drafted by the Saskatchewan Roughriders in the 2013 CFL draft Vonk was released following training camp and returned to the University of Waterloo to complete his college eligibility. He played wearing a cast as he had broken his hand in a scrimmage early in the season. He returned to the Roughriders in 2014 and made his professional debut on August 2, 2014. In three seasons with the Riders Vonk played in 27 games, starting 9.

=== Montreal Alouettes ===
On June 7, 2017, Vonk was traded to the Montreal Alouettes in exchange for defensive back Denzel Radford. In his first season in Montreal Vonk played in nine games, before tearing his ACL ending his season. Vonk was released by the Alouettes on April 17, 2018, as his knee was not ready for the upcoming season.
