= Mother Teresa High School =

St. Mother Teresa High School

Location
- 440 Longfields Drive; Ottawa, Ontario, K2J 4T1; Canada; 45.2850°N 75.7393°W

Information
- School type: Catholic High School
- Motto: Amor et Dignitas (Love and Dignity)
- Religious affiliation: Roman Catholic
- Founded: 1998
- School board: Ottawa-Carleton Catholic School Board
- Superintendent: Sean Kelly
- Area trustee: Spencer Warren
- Principal: Wanda Symes
- Grades: 7-12
- Enrollment: ~1500 (May 2016)
- Language: English, French
- Area: Barrhaven, Ottawa
- Colours: Blue and White
- Mascot: Titus
- Team name: Titans
- Website: teh.ocsb.ca

St. Mother Teresa High School is a Catholic secondary school in the Nepean district of Ottawa, Ontario, Canada. It is part of the Ottawa Catholic School Board (OCSB). It supports grades 7–12. The motto of the school is Amor et Dignitas or "love and dignity."

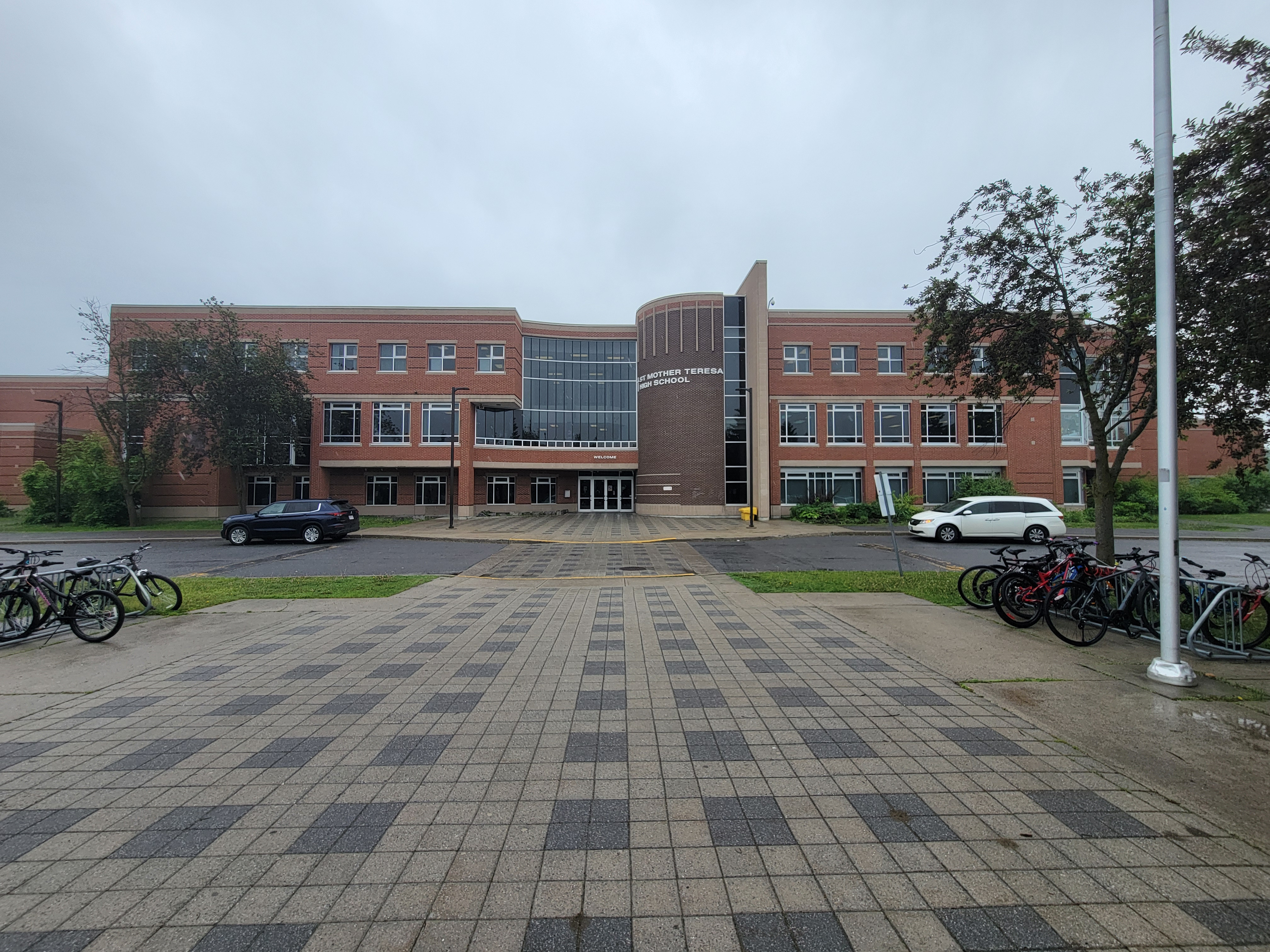
The main entrance to the school

== Sports ==
Mother Teresa has many sports teams, including alpine skiing, badminton, baseball, basketball, cross country running, curling, field hockey, golf, hockey, Ski Club, soccer, softball, field lacrosse, swimming, tackle football, track and field, varsity girls touch football, volleyball and wrestling.

On May 28, 2014, the OFSAA division baseball team won the NCSSAA city championship giving the school its seventh city championship win of the school year.

On May 21, 2025, the girls' tackle football team won the provincial championship against St. Benedict secondary school. The event took place in Vaughan, Ontario and ended with a score of 14 - 13 in favor of Mother Teresa.

== Arts ==
Mother Teresa's Drama Department put on a production of twinkly stars in 2015.

== Lunchtime clubs ==
Mother Teresa has a diverse selection of official lunchtime clubs that include, Key Club, Eco Club, Business Club, Trivia Club, Makerspace Club and Math Club.

=== Social justice clubs ===
Mother Teresa offers several lunchtime clubs for minority groups including the Latino Hispanic Student Association, Black Students' Association, Rainbow Alliance, Asian Student Association, Muslim Student Association, Indigenous Student Association and Filipino Student Association.

==== Black History Month Showcase ====
Mother Teresa hosts an annual event at the end of February to "celebrate black excellence". The Showcase generally includes poems, choreographed dancing and artwork and is organized by the school's Black Students' Association. In 2025, the Showcase included a fashion show.

== Feeder schools ==
Mother Teresa's student population starting in the seventh grade, is maintained by a flow of former sixth grade students from surrounding OCSB elementary schools.

The officially listed feeder schools are as listed:

- Monsignor Paul Baxter School
- St. Andrew School
- St. Luke School, Nepean
- St. Elizabeth Ann Seton School
- St. Patrick School

== 2011 Explosion ==
On May 26, 2011, an empty barrel of peppermint oil exploded in an auto-shop class, killing 18-year-old student Eric Leighton, a hockey player with the Almonte Thunder, as well as causing minor injuries to four other students and one staff member.

== Renaming ==
On 4 September 2016, the school's patron Mother Teresa was canonized into Sainthood by Pope Francis. She is now referred to as Saint Teresa of Calcutta in the Catholic Church. The Ottawa Catholic School Board decided to rename the high school, St. Mother Teresa Catholic High School to keep with tradition.

== See also ==
- Education in Ontario
- List of high schools in Ontario
- List of Ottawa schools
