= Jermaine Gabriel =

Canadian gridiron football player and coach (born 1990)

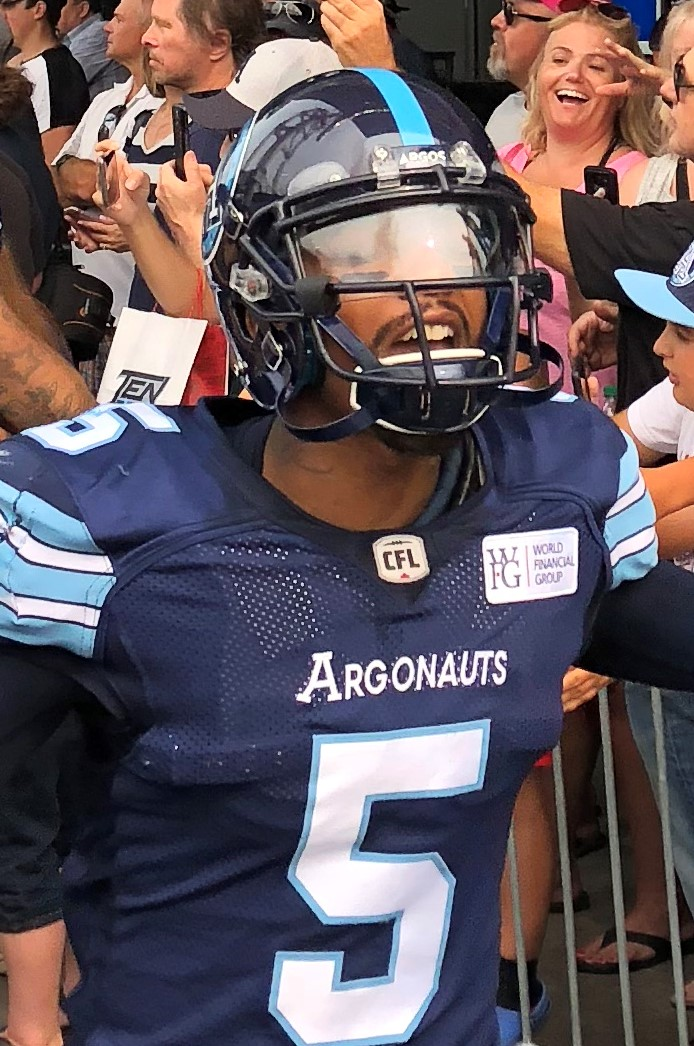
- Gabriel with the Toronto Argonauts in 2018

Saint Mary's Huskies
- Position: Defensive backs coach
- Roster status: Active
- CFL status: National

Personal information
- Born: March 14, 1990 (age 36); Scarborough, Ontario
- Listed height: 5 ft 9 in (1.75 m)
- Listed weight: 190 lb (86 kg)

Career information
- CJFL: Calgary Colts
- University: Bishop's
- CFL draft: 2013: 2nd round, 17th overall pick

Career history

Playing
- 2013–2019: Toronto Argonauts
- 2020–2021: Edmonton Eskimos / Elks
- 2021: Montreal Alouettes*
- * Offseason or practice squad member only

Coaching
- 2023–present: Saint Mary's Huskies (DB coach)

Awards and highlights
- 105th Grey Cup champion (2017); 2012 PFC MVP
- Stats at CFL.ca

Jermaine Gabriel (born March 14, 1990) is a Canadian former professional football defensive back and is currently the defensive backs coach for the Saint Mary's Huskies of U Sports. He played for eight seasons with three teams in the Canadian Football League (CFL) and won a Grey Cup championship with the Toronto Argonauts in 2017.

== Early life ==
Gabriel was raised in Scarborough. Later, he moved to Calgary and Halifax.

== Amateur career ==
Gabriel played CIS football with the Bishop's Gaiters from 2009 to 2010 while sitting out the 2011 season. He then joined the Calgary Colts of the Canadian Junior Football League for the 2012 season before joining the professional ranks.

== Professional career ==
=== Toronto Argonauts ===
Gabriel was drafted 17th overall in the 2013 CFL draft by the Toronto Argonauts and signed with the club on May 22, 2013. He made the team's active roster following training camp and played in his first career professional game on June 28, 2013 against the Hamilton Tiger-Cats where he recorded three special teams tackles. Later that season, he recorded his first two career sacks in a game against the Montreal Alouettes on September 8, 2013. He later played in his first Grey Cup game during the 2017 season where he recorded four defensive tackles and one forced fumble in the Argonauts' 105th Grey Cup victory over the Calgary Stampeders.

Overall, Gabriel played in 95 regular season games for the Argonauts where he recorded 239 defensive tackles, seven sacks, two interceptions, four forced fumbles, and scored one touchdown. He became a free agent on February 11, 2020.

=== Edmonton Eskimos / Elks ===
On February 13, 2020, Gabriel signed with the Edmonton Eskimos. However, the 2020 CFL season was cancelled and he did not play in 2020. He re-signed with Edmonton to a contract extension through 2021 on December 26, 2020. He played in five regular season games with the newly-named Edmonton Elks before being released on September 24, 2021.

=== Montreal Alouettes ===
On October 13, 2021, it was announced that Gabriel had signed with the Montreal Alouettes. He spent the remainder of the season on the practice roster and was released on November 29, 2021.

== Coaching career ==
In April 2023, Gabriel joined the Saint Mary's Huskies coaching staff as the team's defensive backs coach.
