= Shane Bergman =

Canadian football player (born 1990)

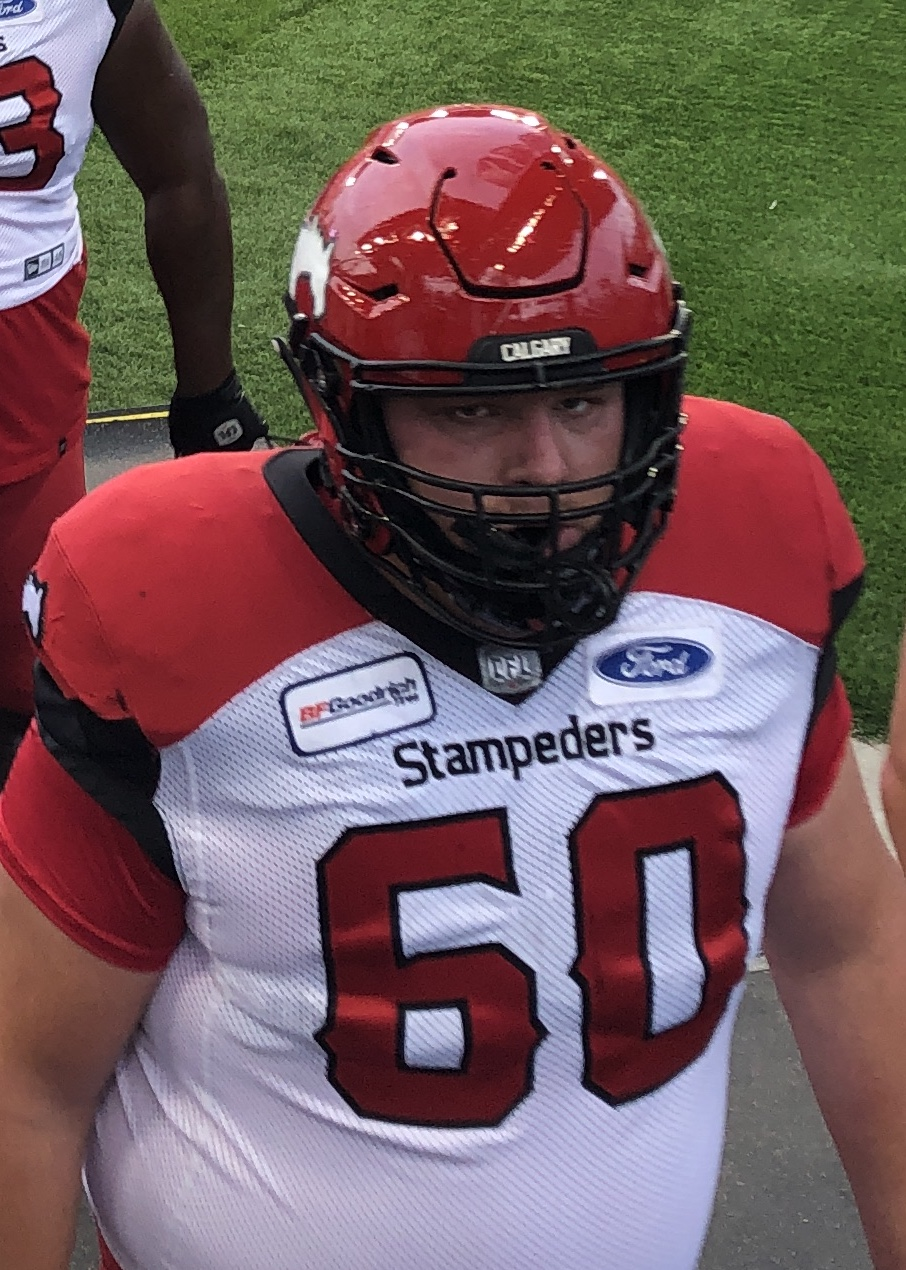
- Bergman with the Calgary Stampeders in 2019

No. 60
- Position: Offensive lineman

Personal information
- Born: February 9, 1990 (age 36); Teeterville, Ontario, Canada
- Listed height: 6 ft 6 in (1.98 m)
- Listed weight: 345 lb (156 kg)

Career information
- High school: Waterford (ON)
- University: Western
- CFL draft: 2013: 6th round, 48th overall pick

Career history
- 2013–2020: Calgary Stampeders

Awards and highlights
- 2× Grey Cup champion (2014, 2018); CFL All-Star (2019); CFL West All-Star (2019)
- Stats at CFL.ca

Shane Bergman (born February 9, 1990) is a Canadian former professional football offensive lineman who played seven seasons for the Calgary Stampeders of the Canadian Football League (CFL). He is a two-time Grey Cup champion having won in 2014 and 2018 and was a CFL-All Star in 2019. He played CIS football at the University of Western Ontario.

== Early life ==
Bergman played football at Waterford District High School in Waterford, Ontario. He helped the team win a league championship in 2009.

== College career ==
Bergman played CIS football for the Western Ontario Mustangs.

== Professional career ==
Bergman was drafted by the Calgary Stampeders in the sixth round with the 48th pick in the 2013 CFL draft. He signed with the Stampeders on May 21, 2013. He made his CFL debut on November 1, 2013 against the BC Lions. He started 14 games at left guard during the 2014 season.

In 2019, he was the Stampeders' Most Outstanding Offensive Lineman. He did not play in 2020 due to the cancellation of the 2020 CFL season and he announced his retirement on January 27, 2021.
