= Brett Jones (gridiron football) =

Canadian gridiron football player (born 1991)

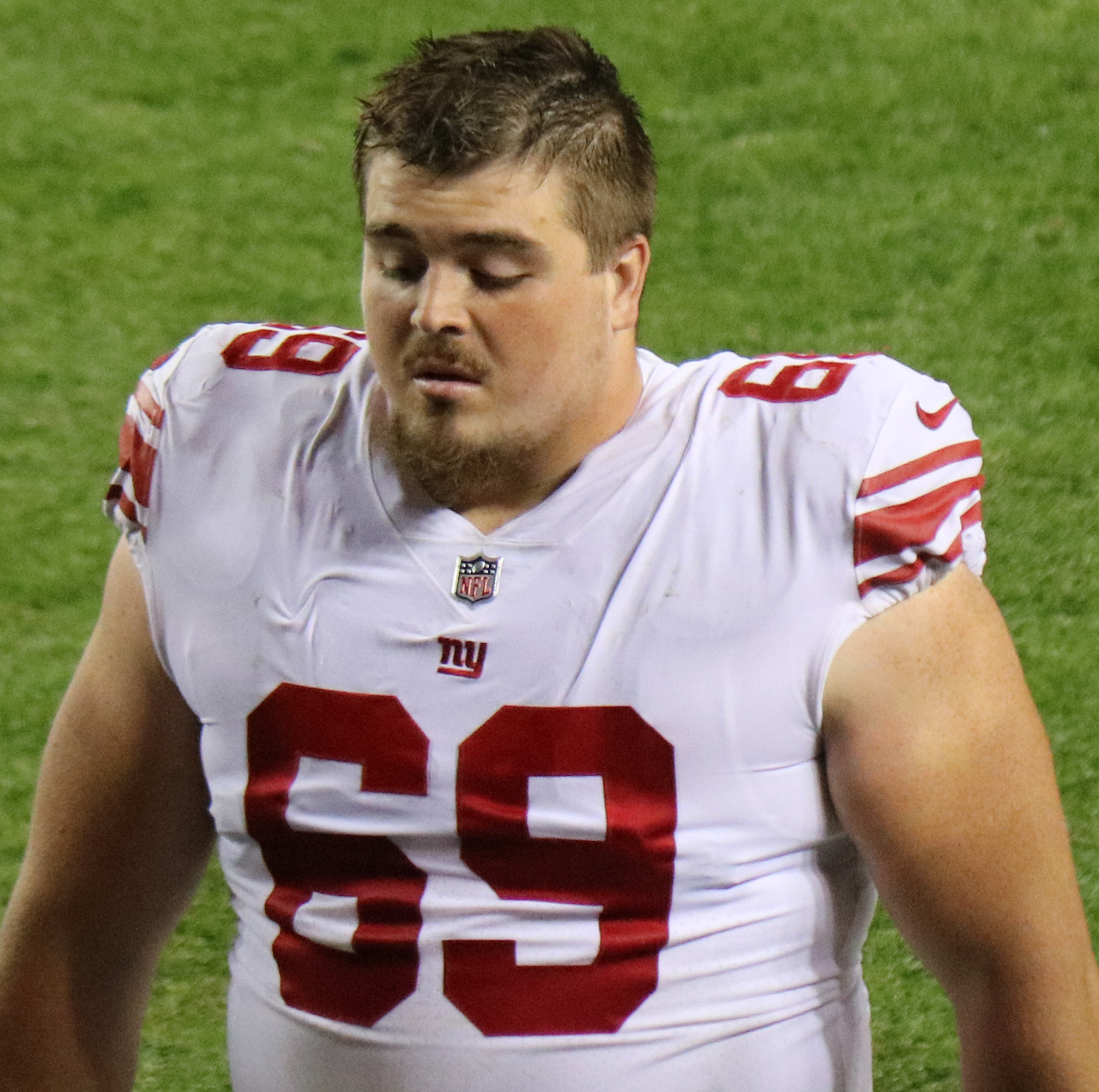
- Jones with the New York Giants in 2017

No. 69, 61
- Position: Center

Personal information
- Born: July 29, 1991 (age 35); Weyburn, Saskatchewan, Canada
- Listed height: 6 ft 2 in (1.88 m)
- Listed weight: 315 lb (143 kg)

Career information
- High school: Weyburn Comprehensive (Weyburn)
- University: Regina
- NFL draft: 2013: undrafted
- CFL draft: 2013: 2nd round, 16th overall pick

Career history
- Calgary Stampeders (2013–2014); New York Giants (2015–2017); Minnesota Vikings (2018–2020); Denver Broncos (2021)

Awards and highlights
- Grey Cup champion (2014); CFL's Most Outstanding Offensive Lineman Award (2014); DeMarco-Becket Memorial Trophy (2014); CFL All-Star (2014); CFL West All-Star (2014); CFL's Most Outstanding Rookie Award (2013); Jackie Parker Trophy (2013)

Career NFL statistics
- Games played: 46
- Games started: 17
- Stats at Pro Football Reference
- Stats at CFL.ca (archive)

Brett Jones (born July 29, 1991) is a Canadian former professional football player who was a center in the National Football League (NFL) and Canadian Football League (CFL). He played for the New York Giants and Minnesota Vikings of the NFL, as well as the Calgary Stampeders of the CFL. After the 2012 CIS season, he was ranked as the eighth best player in the Canadian Football League's Amateur Scouting Bureau final rankings for players eligible in the 2013 CFL draft and fifth by players in Canadian Interuniversity Sport. He played CIS football for the Regina Rams.

== Professional career ==
=== Calgary Stampeders ===
In the 2013 CFL draft, Jones was drafted in the second round, 16th overall by the Stampeders and signed with the team on May 29, 2013. He played CIS football for the Regina Rams. He won the CFL's Most Outstanding Offensive Lineman Award in 2014 after winning the CFL's Most Outstanding Rookie Award in 2013.

=== New York Giants ===
On February 10, 2015, it was reported that the New York Giants were signing Jones. It was made official when the Giants announced the signing on February 11, 2015. On September 5, 2015, Jones' season came to an end when he was officially placed on injured reserve by the Giants. He played back up centre for the 2016 season and is penciled in as same role for the 2017 season. He started 13 games in 2017 as guard and center throughout the season.

On March 14, 2018, the Giants placed a second-round restricted free agent tender on Jones.

=== Minnesota Vikings ===
On August 26, 2018, Jones was traded to the Minnesota Vikings for the 2019 seventh-round draft pick. He started the first three games of the season at center in place of an injured Pat Elflein, but was reduced to a backup role the rest of the season when Elflein returned from injury.

On April 1, 2019, Jones re-signed with the Vikings. He was released on September 3, 2019, but was re-signed a week later. He was placed on injured reserve on November 14, 2019. He was designated for return from injured reserve on January 1, 2020, and began practicing with the team again.

On March 27, 2020, Jones re-signed with the Vikings. On September 5, 2020, Jones was released by the Vikings and signed to the practice squad the next day. He was promoted to the active roster on September 18, 2020. He was released on October 27 and re-signed to the practice squad the next day. He was elevated to the active roster on October 31, November 7, and November 15 for the team's weeks 8, 9, and 10 games against the Green Bay Packers, Detroit Lions, and Chicago Bears, and reverted to the practice squad after each game. He was signed to the active roster on November 17.

=== Denver Broncos ===
On July 27, 2021, Jones signed with the Denver Broncos. He was placed on injured reserve on August 24.
