= Charlie Power (Canadian football) =

Canadian gridiron football player (born 1991)

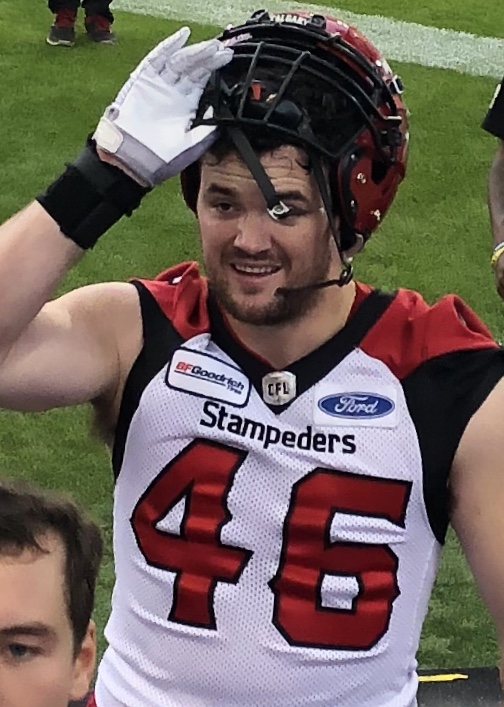
- Power with the Calgary Stampeders in 2019

No. 46
- Positions: Running back, Fullback

Personal information
- Born: June 1, 1991 (age 35). Chamblee, Georgia, U.S.
- Listed height: 6 ft 3 in (1.91 m)
- Listed weight: 239 lb (108 kg)

Career information
- High school: Holy Trinity Academy
- College: Saskatchewan
- CFL draft: 2013: 4th round, 28th overall pick

Career history
- 2013: Calgary Stampeders*
- 2014–2023: Calgary Stampeders
- * Offseason or practice squad member only

Awards and highlights
- 2× Grey Cup champion (2014) (2018)
- Stats at CFL.ca

Charlie Power (born June 1, 1991) is a Canadian former professional football running back and fullback who played for the Calgary Stampeders of the Canadian Football League (CFL).

== Early life ==
Power played high school football as a linebacker for the Holy Trinity Academy Knights in Okotoks, Alberta from 2006 to 2008. He won the Knights' defensive player of the year award in each of his three seasons, and helped lead the Knights to the provincial semifinals in his senior year.

== College career ==
From 2009 to 2011, Power played college football as a linebacker for the University of Saskatchewan Huskies. In his final year as a linebacker, he achieved 16 tackles and a fumble recovery. Power was moved to the slotback position in 2012 and recorded 18 receptions for 231 yards and two touchdowns in his first season as a receiver at any level. In 2013, he achieved 143 yards and a touchdown with 14 catches.

== Professional career ==
Power was selected by the Calgary Stampeders in the fourth round of the 2013 CFL draft with the 28th overall pick as a fullback and was signed on May 21. He practiced with the team at training camp in 2013 before deciding to return to the University of Saskatchewan for a year. On January 8, 2014, Power re-signed with the Stampeders, where he spent the majority of the season on the practice roster. He made his CFL debut on September 1, 2014, in the Labour Day Classic against the Edmonton Eskimos. Power went on to play in one more game that season, but recorded no statistics. In Calgary's first preseason game of 2015 against the BC Lions, Power recorded four tackles and a forced fumble.

Power re-signed with the Stampeders on January 11, 2021. He retired after the 2023 season.

== Coaching career ==
Power returned to the Holy Trinity Academy to coach at his former high school in the fall of 2014, where he coached linebackers. He continued in this position in 2015, switching to coach receivers and the special teams.
