= Ben D'Aguilar =

Canadian football player (born 1989)

No. 95
- Position: Defensive lineman

Personal information
- Born: September 12, 1989 (age 37); Hamilton, Ontario, Canada
- Listed height: 6 ft 2 in (1.88 m)
- Listed weight: 240 lb (109 kg)

Career information
- University: McMaster
- CFL draft: 2013: 2nd round, 13th overall pick

Career history
- 2013–2017: Calgary Stampeders
- 2017: Hamilton Tiger-Cats

Awards and highlights
- 2011 Vanier Cup Champion; Grey Cup champion (2014); J. P. Metras Trophy (2012); Most sacks in a CIS season (12.5 sacks)
- Stats at CFL.ca

Ben D'Aguilar (born September 12, 1989) is a professional Canadian football defensive lineman for the Hamilton Tiger-Cats of the Canadian Football League (CFL). After the 2012 CIS season, he was ranked as the seventh best player in the CFL's Amateur Scouting Bureau final rankings for players eligible in the 2013 CFL draft and fourth by players in Canadian Interuniversity Sport. D'Aguilar was drafted in the second round, 13th overall by the Calgary Stampeders and signed with the team on May 21, 2013. He played for the Stampeders for five years, winning one Grey Cup, before being released and signed by the Tiger-Cats. He played college football for the McMaster Marauders and helped them to win the 47th Vanier Cup
