= Euclid Cummings =

American football player (born 1991)

No. 94
- Position: Defensive tackle

Personal information
- Born: May 6, 1991 (age 35); Atlanta, Georgia, U.S.
- Listed height: 6 ft 4 in (1.93 m)
- Listed weight: 285 lb (129 kg)

Career information
- High school: Centennial (Roswell, Georgia)
- College: Georgia Tech (2009–2013)
- NFL draft: 2014: undrafted

Career history
- Tampa Bay Buccaneers (2014)*; Toronto Argonauts (2014–2015); Winnipeg Blue Bombers (2016); Edmonton Eskimos (2017); BC Lions (2018)*
- * Offseason or practice squad member only

Euclid Patrick Cummings (born May 6, 1991) is an American former professional football defensive tackle who played in the Canadian Football League (CFL) with the Toronto Argonauts, Winnipeg Blue Bombers, and Edmonton Eskimos. He played college football at Georgia Tech.

== Early life ==
Euclid Patrick Cummings was born on May 6, 1991, in Atlanta, Georgia. His father is also named Euclid Patrick Cummings, after the ancient Greek mathematician Euclid. Cummings attended Centennial High School in Roswell, Georgia.

== College career ==
Cummings played college football for the Georgia Tech Yellow Jackets from 2010 to 2013. He redshirted the 2009 season. He only played in three games in 2010, posting two assisted tackles. Cummings played in 39 of Georgia Tech's 40 games from 2011 to 2013, totaling 51 solo tackles, 31 assisted tackles, 11.5 sacks, one forced fumble, and two pass breakups.

== Professional career ==
After going undrafted in the 2014 NFL draft, Cummings signed with the Tampa Bay Buccaneers on May 13, 2014. He was released on August 25, 2014.

Cummings signed with the Toronto Argonauts of the Canadian Football League (CFL) on October 7, 2014. He played in one game for the Argonauts during the 2014 season, and made one tackle on defense. He started all 18 games for Toronto in 2018, totaling 27 tackles on defense, eight sacks, one forced fumble, and one pass breakup. The Argonauts finished the year with an 10–8 record and lost in the East Semi-Final to the Hamilton Tiger-Cats by a score of 25–22.

Cummings became a free agent, and then signed with the Winnipeg Blue Bombers on February 9, 2016. He started all 18 games for Winnipeg in 2016, recording 16 tackles on defense, three sacks, one fumble recovery, and three pass breakups. The Blue Bombers finished the 2016 season 11–7 and lost in the West Semi-Final to the BC Lions 32–31.

Cummings became a free agent after the 2016 season, and signed with the Edmonton Eskimos on February 27, 2017. He started 16 games for the Eskimos in 2017, recording 21 tackles on defense, one special teams tackle, eight sacks (third best in the CFL), and three forced fumbles (second best in the CFL).

On February 13, 2018, Cummimgs became a free agent and signed a $150,000 contract, plus a $70,000 signing bonus, with the BC Lions. On March 8, 2018, it became public that on April 21, 2017, Cummings had been charged with "sexual assault, assault and uttering threats to cause death or bodily harm to one person, and the sexual assault of another." CFL commissioner Randy Ambrosie then voided Cummings's contract.
