= Thomas Miles (Canadian football) =

Canadian football player (born 1992)

No. 52
- Position: Linebacker

Personal information
- Born: July 31, 1992 (age 34); Winnipeg, Manitoba, Canada
- Listed height: 6 ft 1 in (1.85 m)
- Listed weight: 232 lb (105 kg)

Career information
- University: Manitoba
- CFL draft: 2014: 4th round, 33rd overall pick

Career history
- 2014–2016: Toronto Argonauts
- 2017–2020: Winnipeg Blue Bombers

Awards and highlights
- Grey Cup champion (2019)
- Stats at CFL.ca

Thomas Miles (born July 31, 1992) is a Canadian former professional football linebacker who played in the Canadian Football League (CFL). He was drafted in the fourth round, 33rd overall by the Toronto Argonauts in the 2014 CFL draft. He played CIS football for the Manitoba Bisons.

== Professional career ==
=== Toronto Argonauts ===
Miles was drafted by the Toronto Argonauts with the 33rd pick in the 2014 CFL Draft. He played in 40 games over three years with the Argonauts, including eight starts at linebacker. He registered 58 defensive tackles, 16 special teams tackles, two sacks, and one forced fumble over his tenure with the Argonauts. He was released by the Argonauts on March 2, 2017.

=== Winnipeg Blue Bombers ===
Two days after his release, Miles signed with the Winnipeg Blue Bombers on March 4, 2017. He played in all 18 regular season games and the West Semi-Final in 2017, recording five defensive tackles and 14 special teams tackles. In 2018, he was again featured primarily on special teams, playing in 18 regular season games and two post-season games, where he had four defensive tackles and 12 special teams tackles.

During the 2019 Winnipeg Blue Bombers season, Miles once again played in all 18 regular season games and both playoff games, where he recorded four defensive tackles and eight special teams tackles. He was also featured as a long snapper for the first time in his professional career following an injury to Chad Rempel during the Labour Day Classic game. Miles played in his first Grey Cup game on November 24, 2019, and won his first championship following the Blue Bombers' victory over the Hamilton Tiger-Cats in the 107th Grey Cup game. During the follow off-season, he signed a one-year contract extension on February 11, 2020. The 2020 CFL season was later cancelled due to the COVID-19 pandemic, and Miles became a free agent afterwards.
