= Natey Adjei =

Canadian football player (born 1989)

Profile
- Position: Wide receiver

Personal information
- Born: September 15, 1989 (age 37); Toronto, Ontario, Canada
- Listed height: 5 ft 11 in (1.80 m)
- Listed weight: 195 lb (88 kg)

Career information
- High school: St. Joseph Secondary School
- College: Buffalo
- CFL draft: 2013: 3rd round, 22nd overall pick

Career history
- 2014–2015: Toronto Argonauts
- 2016–2019: Edmonton Eskimos
- 2020: Toronto Argonauts*
- 2021: Montreal Alouettes*
- * Offseason or practice squad member only
- Stats at CFL.ca

Natey Adjei (/nəˈteɪ əˈdʒeɪ/ nə-TAY ə-JAY;; born September 15, 1989) is a former Canadian football wide receiver in the Canadian Football League (CFL) who played in six seasons and was a member of three CFL teams. He played college football at City College of San Francisco and the University at Buffalo and attended St. Joseph Secondary School in Mississauga, Ontario.

== Professional career ==
=== Toronto Argonauts ===
Adjei was drafted in the third round with the 22nd overall pick in the 2013 CFL draft by the Toronto Argonauts. He played his first two seasons with the Argonauts, catching a total of 11 passes for 124 yards and one touchdown.

=== Edmonton Eskimos ===
Adjei was then signed by the Edmonton Eskimos prior to the 2016 CFL season. After catching only six passes in this first two seasons in Edmonton he saw an increased workload in 2018, catching 22 passes for 214 yards and a touchdown. Adjei and the Eskimos agreed to a two-year contract extension on January 24, 2019. He enjoyed a career year in 2019, playing in all 18 regular season games and recording 75 catches for 534 yards and two touchdowns, including one on a career-long reception of 77 yards. He was released by the Eskimos during the ensuing off-season on February 1, 2020.

=== Toronto Argonauts (II) ===
On February 5, 2020, it was announced that Adjei had re-joined the Toronto Argonauts as a free agent. However, he did not play in 2020 due to the cancellation of the 2020 CFL season and he became a free agent in 2021.

=== Montreal Alouettes ===
On February 11, 2021, it was announced that Adjei had been signed by the Montreal Alouettes. However, he retired shortly before the 2021 season began on June 22, 2021.

Natey Adjei finished his career having played in 98 regular season games with 97 receptions for 925 yards and four touchdowns. He also made 33 special teams tackles and eight other tackles.

== Sportscasting career ==
Following his retirement Adjei joined TSN 1050 to be the radio colour commentator for Argos games, alongside play-by-play announcer Mike Hogan.
