= Matt Sewell =

Canadian gridiron football player (born 1990)

No. 59
- Position: Offensive lineman

Personal information
- Born: January 26, 1990 (age 36); Milton, Ontario, Canada
- Listed height: 6 ft 7 in (2.01 m)
- Listed weight: 335 lb (152 kg)

Career information
- University: McMaster
- CFL draft: 2013: 1st round, 8th overall pick

Career history
- 2013: Tennessee Titans*
- 2014–2015: Toronto Argonauts
- 2016: Saskatchewan Roughriders
- * Offseason or practice squad member only

Awards and highlights
- 2011 Vanier Cup Champion
- Stats at CFL.ca

Matthew Sewell (born January 26, 1990) is a Canadian football coach and former player. He is the offensive line coach for York University. He was an offensive lineman in the Canadian Football League (CFL).

After the 2012 CIS season, he was ranked as the fourth best player in the Canadian Football League’s Amateur Scouting Bureau final rankings for players eligible in the 2013 CFL draft and third by players in Canadian Interuniversity Sport. Sewell was drafted in the first round, eighth overall by the Toronto Argonauts, despite having signed with the Tennessee Titans of National Football League. He played college football for the McMaster Marauders and helped them to win the 47th Vanier Cup After being released by the Titans near the end of May 2013, Sewell decided to return play one more year of CIS football with the McMaster Marauders while completing his Masters of Business Administration.

On February 12, 2014, Sewell signed with the Toronto Argonauts of the CFL.

On July 2, 2016, Sewell and Mitchell Gale were traded to the Saskatchewan Roughriders for Shawn Lemon and a conditional 2018 CFL draft pick.

== Early life ==
Sewell graduated from the Berkshire School in 2009 before attending McMaster University.
