= Shane Herbert =

Canadian football player (born 1988)

No. 1, 33
- Position: Defensive back

Personal information
- Born: December 29, 1988 (age 37); Ajax, Ontario, Canada
- Listed height: 6 ft 2 in (1.88 m)
- Listed weight: 190 lb (86 kg)

Career information
- University: Wilfrid Laurier
- CFL draft: 2011: undrafted

Career history
- 2013–2015: Toronto Argonauts
- 2016: Saskatchewan Roughriders
- 2016: Hamilton Tiger-Cats
- Stats at CFL.ca

Shane Herbert (born December 29, 1988) is a Canadian former professional football defensive back.

== Career ==
He was signed by the Toronto Argonauts in June 2011 after going undrafted in the 2011 CFL draft. He returned to the Wilfrid Laurier Golden Hawks in 2011 to complete his fifth year of play. He re-joined the Argonauts and made his CFL debut on June 28, 2013 against the Hamilton Tiger-Cats, but sustained a season-ending injury in the game. He returned to play in the 2014 and 2015 seasons, playing in a total of 24 games with the Argonauts. He was part of Toronto's final cuts of 2016 training camp and was promptly signed by the Roughriders on June 19, 2016.
