= Mitchell Gale =

American gridiron football player (born 1990)

No. 14
- Position: Quarterback

Personal information
- Born: January 7, 1990 (age 36); Alva, Oklahoma, U.S.
- Listed height: 6 ft 2 in (1.88 m)
- Listed weight: 231 lb (105 kg)

Career information
- High school: Alva (Oklahoma)
- College: Abilene Christian

Career history
- 2013–2015: Toronto Argonauts
- 2015: Hamilton Tiger-Cats
- 2016: Toronto Argonauts
- 2016: Saskatchewan Roughriders
- 2017: Calgary Stampeders*
- 2017: BC Lions
- 2018: Winnipeg Blue Bombers
- * Offseason or practice squad member only
- Stats at CFL.ca

Mitchell Gale (born January 7, 1990) is an American former professional football quarterback who played in the Canadian Football League (CFL). He played college football at Abilene Christian University. He was a member of the Toronto Argonauts, Hamilton Tiger-Cats, Saskatchewan Roughriders, Calgary Stampeders, BC Lions, and Winnipeg Blue Bombers of the CFL.

== Early life and college ==
Gale attended Alva High School in Alva, Oklahoma.

Gale was a four-year starter at Abilene Christian University. He threw for 97 touchdowns and over 12,000 career yards. Gale and former ACU quarterback Billy Malone became just the third pair of teammates to throw for over 12,000 yards.

== Professional career ==
Pre-draft measurables
Height	Weight	40-yard dash	10-yard split	20-yard split	20-yard shuttle	Three-cone drill	Vertical jump	Broad jump
6 ft 2 in (1.88 m)	221 lb (100 kg)	5.01 s	1.69 s	2.97 s	4.67 s	7.29 s	29 1/2 in (0.75 m)	8 ft 6 in (2.59 m)
All values from Abilene Christian Pro Day

Gale attended rookie mini-camp with the St. Louis Rams of the National Football League in May 2013 on a tryout basis.

Gale was signed by the Toronto Argonauts on May 16, 2013. He was released by the Argonauts on September 2, 2015.

Gale signed with the Hamilton Tiger-Cats on November 3, 2015.

Gale was signed by the Argonauts on June 10, 2016.

On July 2, 2016, Gale and Matt Sewell were traded to the Saskatchewan Roughriders for Shawn Lemon and a conditional 2018 CFL draft pick. In Week 4 starting quarterback Darian Durant left the game in the early second quarter, thrusting Mitchell Gale into the starting role. Gale made his first career CFL start on July 22, throwing for 354 yards and one touchdown in a come-from-behind victory at home over the Ottawa Redblacks, which was the Roughriders' first win of the 2016 campaign. Gale would also start the following week before Durant returned from his leg injury. Having been eliminated from playoff contention the Riders started Gale at quarterback for the final week of the season. He finished the season having completed 79 out of 137 pass attempts (58%) for 937 yards with 2 touchdowns and 3 interceptions. On January 27, 2017, about two weeks before becoming a free agent, Gale was released by the Riders along with three of his teammates.

Gale signed with the Calgary Stampeders on February 15, 2017. He was released on June 17, 2017 during final roster cuts.

Gale was signed to the practice roster of the BC Lions on September 12, 2017. He was promoted to the active roster on September 15. He dressed in seven games for the Lions during the 2017 season but did not take an in-game rep for the team. Gale was released by the Lions on March 14, 2018.

Gale was signed to the practice roster of the Winnipeg Blue Bombers on June 18, 2018. He was promoted to the active roster on June 21 and dressed in two games for the Blue Bombers before being moved back to the practice roster on July 3. He was released on July 26, 2018.
