= 2013 CFL draft =

Canadian football draft

General information
- Sport: Canadian football
- Date: May 6
- Time: 12:00 PM ET
- Location: Toronto
- Network: TSN

Overview
- 60 total selections in 7 rounds
- First selection: Linden Gaydosh
- Most selections: Montreal Alouettes (9)
- Fewest selections: Ottawa Redblacks (4)
- CIS selections: 44
- NCAA selections: 16

The 2013 CFL draft took place on Monday, May 6, 2013, at 12:00 PM ET on TSN. 60 players were chosen from among eligible players from Canadian Universities across the country, as well as Canadian players playing in the NCAA. The Montreal Alouettes had the most selections with nine, followed by the Hamilton Tiger-Cats with eight. Each of the West Division teams had seven picks while Winnipeg had six. The defending Grey Cup champion Toronto Argonauts had five picks and Ottawa chose four players from NCAA schools that would play another year. A total of 16 trades were made involving draft picks from this year, including two made on draft day itself, with 12 being made by the Edmonton Eskimos. Of the 60 draft selections, 44 players were drafted from Canadian Interuniversity Sport institutions, which is the highest number of CIS players taken since the 1987 CFL draft when 50 of 72 were taken. It is also the highest percentage (73.3%) of CIS players taken since 2009 (38 of 48, 79.1%, were selected then).

The Ottawa expansion team was scheduled to pick last in the first four rounds of the 2012 CFL draft, with selections being limited to NCAA redshirt juniors. Due to stadium delays, Ottawa will join the Canadian Football League in 2014, and participated in this year's draft instead. 18 players were classified as redshirt juniors with 12 being selected in this year's draft. The draft also expand to seven rounds this year for the first time since 1996, with the CFL citing stronger Canadian talent as a reason for the expansion.

The first two rounds were broadcast live on TSN with CFL Commissioner Mark Cohon announcing each selection. The production was hosted by Rod Black and featured the CFL on TSN panel which includes Duane Forde, Chris Schultz, Paul LaPolice, Dave Naylor, Stefan Ptaszek, Brian Dobie, and Danny Maciocia who analyzed the teams' needs and picks.

== Top prospects ==
A total of 55 Canadian prospects participated in the 2013 CFL Combine. The official CFL Scouting Bureau rankings are listed below.

NCAA Redshirt Juniors ^

Final Ranking	December Ranking	September Ranking	Player	Position	School
1	1	3	Boseko Lokombo^	Linebacker	Oregon
2	4	1	Stefan Charles	Defensive lineman	Regina
3	3	2	Linden Gaydosh	Defensive lineman	Calgary
4	2	4	Matt Sewell	Offensive lineman	McMaster
5	6	-	Andy Mulumba	Defensive lineman	Eastern Michigan
6	10	14	Nolan MacMillan^	Offensive lineman	Iowa
7	5	10	Ben D'Aguilar	Defensive end	McMaster
8	11	9	Brett Jones	Offensive lineman	Regina
9	9	-	Brent Urban^	Defensive lineman	Virginia
10	14	-	Mike Edem	Linebacker	Calgary
11	-	-	Seydou Junior Haidara	Wide receiver	Laval
12	7	6	Corey Watman	Offensive lineman	Eastern Michigan
13	8	7	Jesse Joseph^	Defensive end	Connecticut
14	-	-	Connor Williams^	Defensive lineman	Utah State
15	-	13	Brander Craighead^	Offensive lineman	UTEP
-	12	11	Stephen Alli^	Wide receiver	Florida
-	13	5	Steven Lumbala	Running back	Calgary
-	15	8	Kalonji Kashama^	Defensive end	Eastern Michigan
-	-	12	Elie Ngoyi	Defensive lineman	Bishop's
-	-	15	Yannick Morin-Plante	Wide receiver	Laval

== Trades ==
In the explanations below, (D) denotes trades that took place during the draft, while (PD) indicates trades completed pre-draft.

=== Round one ===
- Edmonton → Montreal (PD). Edmonton traded this selection, Derek Schiavone, and a fourth round pick in this year's draft to Montreal for Brody McKnight.

=== Round two ===
- Saskatchewan → Calgary (PD). Saskatchewan traded this selection and a third round pick in the 2012 CFL draft to Calgary for a second round pick in the 2012 CFL draft and a fifth round pick in the 2012 CFL draft.
- Edmonton → BC (PD). Edmonton traded this selection and a second round pick in the 2014 CFL draft to BC for Mike Reilly and a second round pick in this year's draft.
- BC → Edmonton (PD). BC traded this selection and Mike Reilly to BC for a second round pick in this year's draft and a second round pick in the 2014 CFL draft.
- Hamilton → Edmonton (PD). Hamilton traded this selection and a third round pick in this year's draft to Edmonton for a second round pick in this year's draft and the rights to Hasan Hazime.
- Edmonton → Hamilton (PD). Edmonton traded this selection and the rights to Hasan Hazime to Hamilton for a second round pick in this year's draft and a third round pick in this year's draft.

=== Round three ===
- Edmonton → BC (PD). Edmonton traded this selection to BC for Jerome Messam. This pick was originally a fifth round selection, but it was upgraded to round three.
- Hamilton → Edmonton (PD). Hamilton traded this selection and a second round pick in this year's draft to Edmonton for a second round pick in this year's draft and the rights to Hasan Hazime.
- Toronto → Edmonton (PD). Toronto traded this selection to Edmonton for two fifth round picks in this year's draft and Jermaine Reid.
- Saskatchewan → Toronto (D). Saskatchewan traded this selection to Toronto for three fifth round picks in this year's draft.

=== Round four ===
- Hamilton → Calgary (PD). Hamilton traded this selection and Jadon Wagner to Calgary for a fifth round pick in this year's draft and Milton Collins.
- Saskatchewan → Edmonton (PD). Saskatchewan traded this selection and the playing rights to Matthew O'Donnell to Edmonton for Greg Carr and a fifth round pick in this year's draft.
- Edmonton → Montreal (PD). Edmonton traded this selection, Derek Schiavone, and a first round pick in this year's draft to Montreal for Brody McKnight.
- Toronto → Hamilton (PD). Toronto traded this selection and Dee Webb to Hamilton for Maurice Mann.
- Calgary → Edmonton (D). Calgary traded this selection to Edmonton for Étienne Légaré.

=== Round five ===
- Winnipeg → Saskatchewan (PD). Winnipeg traded this selection and Odell Willis to Saskatchewan for a second and fourth round pick in the 2012 CFL draft.
- Calgary → Hamilton (PD). Calgary traded this selection and Milton Collins to Hamilton for a fourth round pick in this year's draft and Jadon Wagner.
- Edmonton → Saskatchewan (PD). Edmonton traded this selection and Greg Carr to Saskatchewan for the playing rights to Matthew O'Donnell and a fourth round pick in this year's draft.
- Saskatchewan → Edmonton (PD). Saskatchewan traded two fifth round selections to Edmonton for Brody McKnight and a sixth round pick in this year's draft.
- Edmonton → Toronto (PD). Edmonton traded two fifth round selections and Jermaine Reid to Toronto for a third round pick in this year's draft.
- Toronto → Saskatchewan (D). Toronto traded three fifth round selections to Saskatchewan for a third round pick in this year's draft.

=== Round six ===
- Edmonton → Montreal (PD). Edmonton traded this selection and a sixth round pick in the 2012 CFL draft to Montreal for Dylan Steenbergen.
- Saskatchewan → Edmonton (PD). Saskatchewan traded this selection to Edmonton for left tackle Xavier Fulton.
- Montreal → Edmonton (PD). Montreal traded this selection to Edmonton for Jerome Messam.
- Edmonton → Saskatchewan (PD). Edmonton traded this selection and Brody McKnight to Saskatchewan for two fifth round picks in this year's draft.
- Edmonton → Calgary (PD). Edmonton traded this selection to Calgary for a sixth round pick in this year's draft and Junius Coston.
- Calgary → Edmonton (PD). Calgary traded this selection and Junius Coston to Edmonton for a sixth round pick in this year's draft.

== Round one ==
Pick #	CFL team	Player	Position	School
1	Hamilton Tiger-Cats	Linden Gaydosh	DT	Calgary
2	Winnipeg Blue Bombers	Andy Mulumba	DE	Eastern Michigan
3	Montreal Alouettes (via Edmonton)	Mike Edem	LB	Calgary
4	Saskatchewan Roughriders	Corey Watman	OL	Eastern Michigan
5	Montreal Alouettes	Steven Lumbala	RB	Calgary
6	BC Lions	Hunter Steward	OL	Liberty
7	Calgary Stampeders	Brander Craighead	OL	UTEP
8	Toronto Argonauts	Matt Sewell	OL	McMaster
9	Ottawa Redblacks	Nolan MacMillan	OL	Iowa

== Round two ==
= CFL Division All-Star	= CFL All-Star	= Hall of Famer

Pick #	CFL team	Player	Position	School
10	Edmonton Eskimos (via Hamilton)	Stefan Charles	DT	Regina
11	Winnipeg Blue Bombers	Kristopher Robertson	DB	Concordia
12	BC Lions (via Edmonton)	Seydou Junior Haidara	WR	Laval
13	Calgary Stampeders (via Saskatchewan)	Ben D'Aguilar	DE	McMaster
14	Montreal Alouettes	Hosam Shahin	DT	Rice
15	Hamilton Tiger-Cats (via Edmonton via BC)	Brent Urban	DL	Virginia
16	Calgary Stampeders	Brett Jones	OL	Regina
17	Toronto Argonauts	Jermaine Gabriel	DB	Bishop's
18	Ottawa Redblacks	Connor Williams	DE	Utah State

== Round three ==
= CFL Division All-Star	= CFL All-Star	= Hall of Famer

Pick #	CFL team	Player	Position	School
19	Hamilton Tiger-Cats	Carl-Olivier Prime	LB	Wagner
20	Winnipeg Blue Bombers	Carl Fitzgerald	WR	Saint Mary's
21	BC Lions (via Edmonton)	Boseko Lokombo	LB	Oregon
22	Toronto Argonauts (via Saskatchewan)	Natey Adjei	WR	Buffalo
23	Montreal Alouettes	Jesse Joseph	DE	Connecticut
24	Edmonton Eskimos (via Hamilton via BC)	Kyle Norris	LB	Saint Mary's
25	Calgary Stampeders	Yannick Morin Plante	WR	Laval
26	Edmonton Eskimos (via Toronto)	Christopher Mercer	OL	Regina
27	Ottawa Redblacks	Kalonji Kashama	DE	Eastern Michigan

== Round four ==
Pick #	CFL team	Player	Position	School
28	Calgary Stampeders (via Hamilton)	Charlie Power	WR	Saskatchewan
29	Winnipeg Blue Bombers	Michael DiCroce	WR	McMaster
30	Montreal Alouettes (via Edmonton)	Nicolas Boulay	LB	Sherbrooke
31	Edmonton Eskimos (via Saskatchewan)	Jorgen Hus	LB	Regina
32	Montreal Alouettes	Michael Klassen	DL	Calgary
33	BC Lions	Matt McGarva	DB	Windsor
34	Edmonton Eskimos (via Calgary)	Taylor Servais	OL	Ottawa
35	Hamilton Tiger-Cats (via Toronto)	Simon Le Marquand	WR	Ottawa
36	Ottawa Redblacks	Tyler Digby	TE	Robert Morris

== Round five ==
Pick #	CFL team	Player	Position	School
37	Hamilton Tiger-Cats	Isaac Dell	FB	Wilfrid Laurier
38	Saskatchewan Roughriders (via Winnipeg)	Matt Vonk	OL	Waterloo
39	Saskatchewan Roughriders (via Toronto via Edmonton via Saskatchewan via Edmonton)	Alex Anthony	WR	Wilfrid Laurier
40	Saskatchewan Roughriders (via Toronto via Edmonton via Saskatchewan)	Levi Steinhauer	DL	Saskatchewan
41	Montreal Alouettes	Jake Piotrowski	OL	Guelph
42	BC Lions	Matthew Albright	OL	Saint Mary's
43	Hamilton Tiger-Cats (via Calgary)	Neil King	DB	Saint Mary's
44	Saskatchewan Roughriders (via Toronto)	Spencer Moore	TE	McMaster

== Round six ==
Pick #	CFL team	Player	Position	School
45	Hamilton Tiger-Cats	Michael Daly	DB	McMaster
46	Winnipeg Blue Bombers	Stephen Alli	WR	Florida
47	Montreal Alouettes (via Edmonton)	Simon Legare	OL	Montreal
48	Calgary Stampeders (via Edmonton via Saskatchewan)	Shane Bergman	OL	Western
49	Saskatchewan Roughriders (via Edmonton via Montreal)	Thomas Spoletini	LB	Calgary
50	BC Lions	Matt Walker	DB	British Columbia
51	Edmonton Eskimos (via Calgary)	Elie Ngoyi	DE	Bishop's
52	Toronto Argonauts	Michael Di Domenico	OL	Tarleton State

== Round seven ==
Pick #	CFL team	Player	Position	School
53	Hamilton Tiger-Cats	Brett Lauther	PK	Saint Mary's
54	Winnipeg Blue Bombers	Billy Pavlopoulos	PK	British Columbia
55	Edmonton Eskimos	Smith Wright	FB	Alberta
56	Saskatchewan Roughriders	Eric Armitage	OL	Western
57	Montreal Alouettes	Damone Blackman	WR	Saint Mary's
58	BC Lions	Cameron Thorn	DL	Guelph
59	Calgary Stampeders	Dumitru Ionita	P	Concordia
60	Toronto Argonauts	Paul Spencer	LB	Concordia
