= 2020 Edmonton Football Team season =

CFL team season

- General manager: Brock Sunderland
- Head coach: Scott Milanovich
- Home stadium: Commonwealth Stadium

Results
- Record: N/A
- Division place: N/A, West
- Playoffs: Season cancelled

The 2020 Edmonton Football Team season was scheduled to be the 63rd season for the team in the Canadian Football League (CFL) and their 72nd overall. On July 21, 2020, the team officially retired the "Eskimos" name, and temporarily began using "Edmonton Football Team" and "EE Football Team" until a new name was decided.

Training camps, pre-season games, and regular season games were initially postponed due to the COVID-19 pandemic in Alberta. The CFL announced on April 7, 2020, that the start of the 2020 season would not occur before July 2020. On May 20, 2020, it was announced that the league would likely not begin regular season play prior to September 2020. On August 17, 2020, however, the season was officially cancelled due to COVID-19.

This would have been the first season under head coach Scott Milanovich following the dismissal of Jason Maas following the 2019 season. This also would have been the fourth season under general manager Brock Sunderland.

== CFL national draft ==
The 2020 CFL National Draft took place on April 30, 2020. The team had nine selections in the eight-round draft after acquiring another seventh-round pick from the Toronto Argonauts.

Round	Pick	Player	Position	University team	Hometown
1	4	Thomas Jack-Kurdyla	OL	Buffalo	Montreal, QC
2	13	Alain Pae	DL	Ottawa	Prague, CZ
3	24	Malik Tyne	LB	Towson	Ottawa, ON
4	32	Oludotun Aketepe	DB	Guelph	Barrie, ON
5	41	Dante Brown	K	Fort Hays State	Mississauga, ON
6	50	Chris Gangarossa	OL	Wagner	Fort Erie, ON
7	57	Nicholas Summach	OL	Saskatchewan	Saskatoon, SK
7	59	Rossini Sandjong	DE	York	Longueuil, QC
8	68	Mitch Raper	RB	Carleton	Oshawa, ON

=== CFL global draft ===
The 2020 CFL global draft was scheduled to take place on April 16, 2020. However, due to the COVID-19 pandemic, this draft and its accompanying combine were postponed to occur just before the start of training camp, which was ultimately cancelled. The team was scheduled to select fourth in each round with the number of rounds never announced.

== Planned schedule ==
=== Preseason ===
Week	Game	Date	Kickoff	Opponent	TV	Venue
A	1	Sun, May 24	2:00 p.m. MDT	at Winnipeg Blue Bombers	NA	IG Field
B	2	Sat, May 30	2:00 p.m. MDT	vs. BC Lions	NA	Commonwealth Stadium
C	Bye					

=== Regular season ===
Week	Game	Date	Kickoff	Opponent	TV	Venue
1	1	Thu, June 11	7:00 p.m. MDT	vs. BC Lions	TSN	Commonwealth Stadium
2	2	Sat, June 20	8:00 p.m. MDT	vs. Ottawa Redblacks	TSN	Commonwealth Stadium
3	3	Sat, June 27	5:00 p.m. MDT	at BC Lions	TSN	BC Place
4	4	Fri, July 3	7:00 p.m. MDT	vs. Winnipeg Blue Bombers	TSN	Commonwealth Stadium
5	Bye					
6	5	Fri, July 17	7:30 p.m. MDT	vs. Toronto Argonauts	TSN	Commonwealth Stadium
7	6	Fri, July 24	5:00 p.m. MDT	at Ottawa Redblacks	TSN	TD Place Stadium
8	7	Fri, July 31	7:30 p.m. MDT	vs. Hamilton Tiger-Cats	TSN	Commonwealth Stadium
9	Bye					
10	8	Fri, Aug 14	6:30 p.m. MDT	at Winnipeg Blue Bombers	TSN	IG Field
11	9	Sat, Aug 22	5:00 p.m. MDT	at Saskatchewan Roughriders	TSN	Mosaic Stadium
12	10	Sat, Aug 29	5:00 p.m. MDT	vs. Saskatchewan Roughriders	TSN	Commonwealth Stadium
13	11	Mon, Sept 7	2:30 p.m. MDT	at Calgary Stampeders	TSN	McMahon Stadium
14	12	Sat, Sep 12	5:00 p.m. MDT	vs. Calgary Stampeders	TSN	Commonwealth Stadium
15	13	Fri, Sep 18	5:00 p.m. MDT	at Montreal Alouettes	TSN/RDS	Molson Stadium
16	Bye					
17	14	Sat, Oct 3	5:00 p.m. MDT	vs. Saskatchewan Roughriders	TSN	Commonwealth Stadium
18	15	Fri, Oct 9	6:00 p.m. MDT	at Winnipeg Blue Bombers	TSN	IG Field
19	16	Sat, Oct 17	2:00 p.m. MDT	at Hamilton Tiger-Cats	TSN	Tim Hortons Field
20	17	Sat, Oct 24	2:00 p.m. MDT	vs. Montreal Alouettes	TSN/RDS	Commonwealth Stadium
21	18	Sat, Oct 31	11:00 a.m. MDT	at Toronto Argonauts	TSN	BMO Field

== Team ==
=== Roster ===
Edmonton Football Team roster
**Quarterbacks**: 14 Jeremiah Briscoe; 7 Trevor Harris; 15 Logan Kilgore; -- Antonio Pipkin; -- Bryan Scott; 8 Troy Williams; **Receivers**: 85 Bryce Bobo; -- Alex Charette; 13 Ricky Collins, Jr.; -- Armanti Edwards; 82 Greg Ellingson; 18 Kevin Elliott; -- Angelo Foster; -- J. J. Jones; 72 Hunter Karl; 88 Harry McMaster; 86 Anthony Parker; -- Jimmy Ralph; -- Malik Richards; 83 Shai Ross; -- Shakeir Ryan; -- Kenny Shaw; -- Rodney Smith; -- T.J. Smith; 4 Tevaun Smith; -- Josh Stangby; -- Daniel Vandervoort; 89 Diego Viamontes; -- Domonique Young	**Running backs**: -- Brandon Burks; 25 Shaquille Cooper; -- DeVontae Jackson; -- Marvin Kinsey; -- Jordan Robinson; 33 Alex Taylor; -- Lexington Thomas; -- Terry Williams; **Fullbacks**: 46 Peter Cender; 44 Alexandre Dupuis; 27 Tanner Green; 49 James Tuck; **Offensive linemen**: 62 Kwabena Asare; 57 David Beard; -- Darrell Brown; 64 Tommie Draheim; 67 Colin Kelly; 68 Eric Lofton; 61 Tristan Nickelson; 66 Matt O'Donnell; -- Justin Renfrow; 55 SirVincent Rogers; -- Jean-Simon Roy; 52 Jacob Ruby; 56 Kyle Saxelid	**Defensive linemen**: -- Zachary Barnes; -- Dwayne Beckford; 9 Mathieu Betts; 93 Kwaku Boateng DE; 99 Jake Ceresna; 94 Stefan Charles; -- Jeremiah Clarke; -- Thomas Costigan; -- Malik Dorton; -- Victor Evans II; -- Evan Machibroda; 96 Mike Moore; 63 David Perkins; -- Quincy Redmon; 90 Almondo Sewell DT; **Linebackers**: -- Josh Banderas; -- Malik Clements; 43 Vontae Diggs; -- Justin Horton; 46 Brandon Pittman; 35 Maxime Rouyer; 5 Jovan Santos-Knox; 48 Blair Smith; -- Justin Tuggle; 38 Jonathan Walton	**Defensive backs**: 37 Bryce Bartlett; 16 Jordan Beaulieu; 19 Eric Blake; -- Anthony Covington; -- Zach Edwards; -- Jermaine Gabriel; -- Caleb Ham; 12 Forrest Hightower; 28 Jordan Hoover S; 20 Scott Hutter; -- Afolabi Laguda; -- Jonathon Mincy; -- Dakari Monroe; 23 Godfrey Onyeka; -- Chris Rayford; 34 Jose Romero; -- Albert Smalls; 29 Brian Walker; -- Malcolm Washington; -- Trumaine Washington; -- Kieron Williams; **Special teams**: 53 Ryan King LS; 70 Hugh O'Neill K; 6 Sean Whyte K; Italics indicate international player **Bold** indicates global player Roster updated 2020-08-17; Depth chart • Transactions; 102 roster → More rosters

=== Coaching staff ===
Edmonton Football Team staff
**Front office**: President and ceo – Chris Presson; Vice-President Football Operations and General Manager – Brock Sunderland; Director of player personnel – David Turner; Assistant director of player personnel – Will Homer; Director of scouting – Bobby Merritt; Director of football operations – Kris Hagerman; Assistant director of football operations/player personnel assistant – Nick Pelletier; Head video coordinator – Griffin Dear; **Head coach**: Head coach – Scott Milanovich; **Offensive coaches**: Offensive coordinator – Scott Milanovich; Quarterbacks – Kelly Jeffrey; Offensive line – John McDonell; Running backs – Terry Eisler; Receivers and pass game coordinator – Winston October	**Defensive coaches**: Defensive coordinator and defensive backs – Noel Thorpe; Linebackers – A. J. Gass; Defensive line – Demetrious Maxie; Defensive assistant – Derek Oswalt; **Special teams coaches**: Special teams coordinator – A. J. Gass; Special teams assistant – Kelly Jeffrey; → Coaching staff
