= 2018 Edmonton Eskimos season =

Canadian football team season

- General manager: Brock Sunderland
- Head coach: Jason Maas
- Home stadium: Commonwealth Stadium

Results
- Record: 9–9
- Division place: 5th, West
- Playoffs: did not qualify
- Team MOP: Mike Reilly
- Team MOC: Kwaku Boateng
- Team MOR: Monshadrik Hunter

Uniform

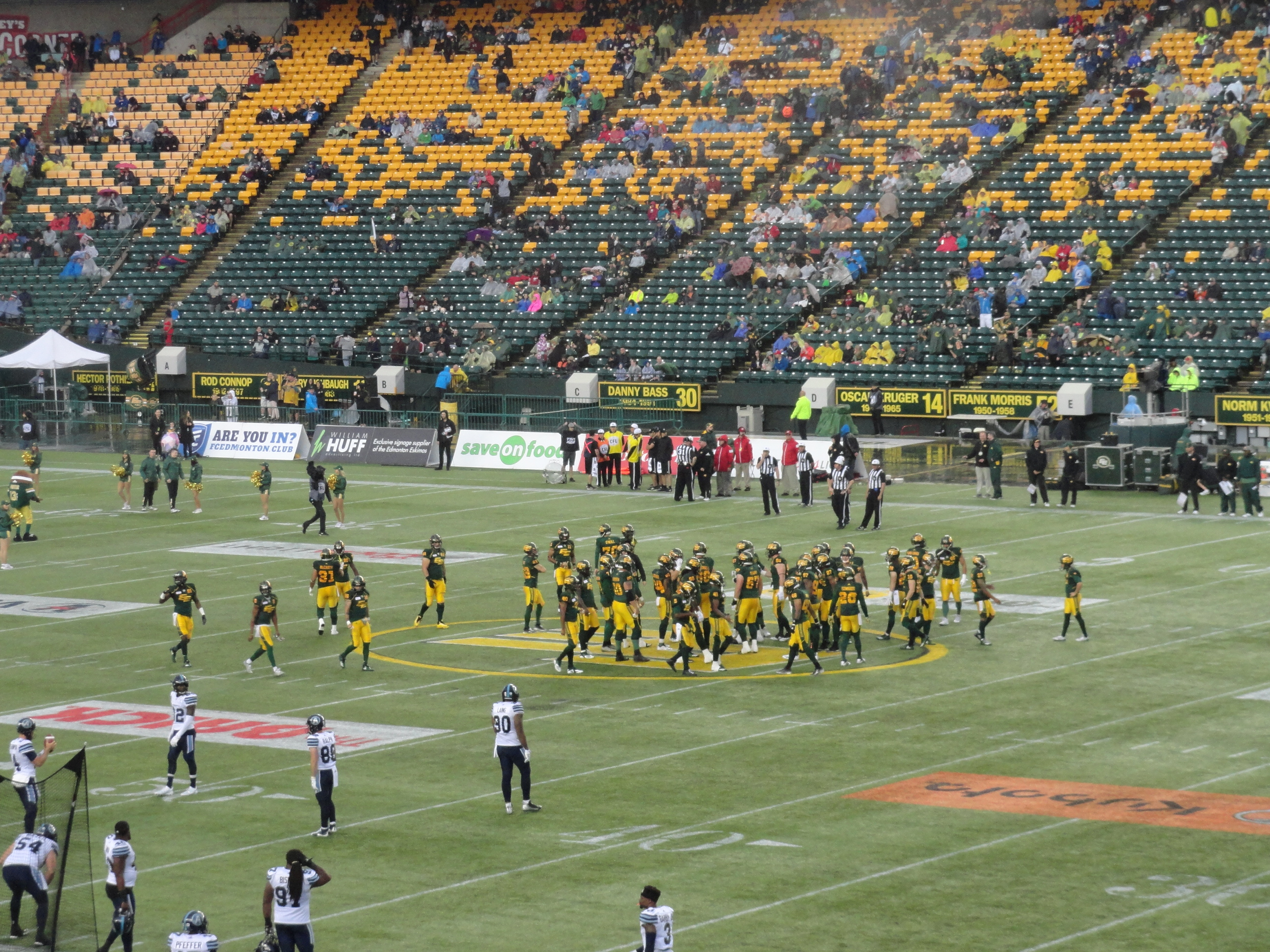
Regular season game versus the Toronto Argonauts

The 2018 Edmonton Eskimos season was the 61st season for the team in the Canadian Football League (CFL) and their 70th overall. This was the third season under head coach Jason Maas and the second season under general manager Brock Sunderland.

The team began the season with a 6–3 win–loss record, but after losing six of the following eight games, the Eskimos were eliminated from the playoffs during their week 20 bye after Winnipeg defeated Calgary to claim the final playoff spot. The Eskimos failed to qualify for the playoffs for the first time since 2013, becoming the first Grey Cup hosts to miss the playoffs since the 2016 Toronto Argonauts.

The Eskimos' 9–9 record was actually tied with the BC Lions for the fifth-best finish in the nine-team league, however BC won the tie-breaker by winning the teams' season series and thus claimed the cross-over berth. Although the Eskimos' record was also better than the 8–10 record of the Eastern runner-up Hamilton Tiger-Cats but CFL rules do not allow two teams from one division to cross over. Edmonton became the first (and, as of 2026, only) Canadian CFL team to miss the playoffs without a losing record since the cross-over rule was implemented.

== Offseason ==
=== CFL draft ===
The 2018 CFL draft took place on May 3, 2018.

Round	Pick	Player	Position	School/Club team
2	10	Godfrey Onyeka	DB	Wilfrid Laurier
3	24	Jordan Beaulieu	DB	Western
4	32	Tanner Green	RB	Concordia
5	40	Curtis Krahn	OL	Calgary
6	48	Alex Taylor	RB	Western
7	53	Harry McMaster	WR	Western
7	57	Gabriel Bagnell	DL	Acadia
8	65	Blair Zerr	RB	Humboldt State

== Preseason ==
Week	Date	Kickoff	Opponent	Results		TV	Venue	Attendance	Summary
Week	Date	Kickoff	Opponent	Score	Record	TV	Venue	Attendance	Summary
A	Sun, May 27	3:00 p.m. MDT	vs. Saskatchewan Roughriders	W 35–12	1–0	TSN	Commonwealth Stadium	28,374	Recap
B	Fri, June 1	6:30 p.m. MDT	at Winnipeg Blue Bombers	L 13–33	1–1	None	Investors Group Field	23,034	Recap
C	Bye								

== Regular season ==
=== Season standings ===
West Division
Team	GP	W	L	T	Pts	PF	PA	Div	Stk	
Calgary Stampeders	18	13	5	0	26	522	363	5–5	W1	Details
Saskatchewan Roughriders	18	12	6	0	24	450	444	7–3	W2	Details
Winnipeg Blue Bombers	18	10	8	0	20	550	419	4–6	L1	Details
BC Lions	18	9	9	0	18	423	473	4–6	L2	Details
Edmonton Eskimos	18	9	9	0	18	482	471	5–5	W1	Details

=== Season schedule ===
Week	Game	Date	Kickoff	Opponent	Results		TV	Venue	Attendance	Summary
Week	Game	Date	Kickoff	Opponent	Score	Record	TV	Venue	Attendance	Summary
1	1	Thurs, June 14	6:30 p.m. MDT	at Winnipeg Blue Bombers	W 33–30	1–0	TSN/RDS2/ESPN2	Investors Group Field	25,458	Recap
2	2	Fri, June 22	8:00 p.m. MDT	vs. Hamilton Tiger-Cats	L 21–38	1–1	TSN	Commonwealth Stadium	31,334	Recap
3	3	Fri, June 29	8:00 p.m. MDT	vs. BC Lions	W 41–22	2–1	TSN/ESPN2	Commonwealth Stadium	29,940	Recap
4	4	Sat, July 7	3:30 p.m. MDT	at Toronto Argonauts	L 17–20	2–2	TSN	BMO Field	12,196	Recap
5	5	Fri, July 13	7:00 p.m. MDT	vs. Toronto Argonauts	W 16–15	3–2	TSN/ESPN2	Commonwealth Stadium	31,056	Recap
6	Bye									
7	6	Thurs, July 26	5:30 p.m. MDT	at Montreal Alouettes	W 44–23	4–2	TSN/RDS	Molson Stadium	16,654	Recap
8	7	Thurs, Aug 2	8:00 p.m. MDT	vs. Saskatchewan Roughriders	W 26–19	5–2	TSN	Commonwealth Stadium	35,623	Recap
9	8	Thurs, Aug 9	8:00 p.m. MDT	at BC Lions	L 23–31	5–3	TSN/ESPN2	BC Place	17,745	Recap
10	9	Sat, Aug 18	7:00 p.m. MDT	vs. Montreal Alouettes	W 40–24	6–3	TSN/RDS/ESPN2	Commonwealth Stadium	29,702	Recap
11	10	Thurs, Aug 23	5:30 p.m. MDT	at Hamilton Tiger-Cats	L 24–25	6–4	TSN/RDS	Tim Hortons Field	23,281	Recap
12	11	Mon, Sept 3	1:00 p.m. MDT	at Calgary Stampeders	L 20–23	6–5	TSN	McMahon Stadium	32,013	Recap
13	12	Sat, Sept 8	5:00 p.m. MDT	vs. Calgary Stampeders	W 48–42	7–5	TSN/RDS	Commonwealth Stadium	38,611	Recap
14	Bye									
15	13	Sat, Sept 22	2:00 p.m. MDT	at Ottawa Redblacks	L 15–28	7–6	TSN/RDS2	TD Place Stadium	24,800	Recap
16	14	Sat, Sept 29	5:00 p.m. MDT	vs. Winnipeg Blue Bombers	L 3–30	7–7	TSN/RDS2	Commonwealth Stadium	28,788	Recap
17	15	Mon, Oct 8	2:00 p.m. MDT	at Saskatchewan Roughriders	L 12–19	7–8	TSN	Mosaic Stadium	31,335	Recap
18	16	Sat, Oct 13	3:00 p.m. MDT	vs. Ottawa Redblacks	W 34–16	8–8	TSN/RDS2	Commonwealth Stadium	27,163	Recap
19	17	Fri, Oct 19	8:00 p.m. MDT	at BC Lions	L 42–32	8–9	TSN	BC Place	20,463	Recap
20	Bye									
21	18	Sat, Nov 3	2:00 p.m. MDT	vs. Winnipeg Blue Bombers	W 33–24	9–9	TSN	Commonwealth Stadium	27,749	Recap

== Roster ==
2018 Edmonton Eskimos final roster
Quarterbacks: 5 Kevin Glenn; 9 Danny O'Brien; 13 Mike Reilly; Running backs: 44 Alexandre Dupuis; 39 C. J. Gable; 30 Martese Jackson; 31 Calvin McCarty; 37 Christophe Normand; Receivers: 3 Natey Adjei; 11 Nate Behar; 89 Kevin Elliott; 18 Sam Giguère; 15 Vidal Hazelton; 80 Bryant Mitchell; 81 Duke Williams	Offensive linemen: 57 David Beard G/C; 58 Travis Bond G; 64 Tommie Draheim T; 67 Colin Kelly T; 66 Matt O'Donnell T/G; 55 Jacob Ruby G/T; 60 Justin Sorensen C; Defensive linemen: 54 Alex Bazzie DE; 93 Kwaku Boateng DE; 94 Jake Ceresna DT; 95 Arnaud Gascon-Nadon DE; 91 Mark Mackie DT; 90 Almondo Sewell DT	Linebackers: 45 Korey Jones; 38 Adam Konar; 10 Christophe Mulumba-Tshimanga; 35 Taylor Reed; 47 J. C. Sherritt; 48 Blair Smith; Defensive backs: 17 Arjen Colquhoun; 26 Chris Edwards; 36 Aaron Grymes; 12 Forrest Hightower; 28 Jordan Hoover; 43 Neil King; 29 Mercy Maston; 23 Godfrey Onyeka; 24 Brandyn Thompson; 7 Josh Woodman	Special teams: 53 Ryan King LS; 70 Hugh O'Neill P/K; 6 Sean Whyte K/P; Practice roster: 16 Jordan Beaulieu DB; 25 Shaq Cooper RB; 27 Tanner Green FB; 14 Zach Kline QB; 22 Jordan Robinson RB; 82 Miles Shuler WR; 63 Mason Woods G; Suspended: Korliss Marshall RB; Jalen Spencer DB; Brian Walker DB	Injured list: 20 Johnny Adams DB; 99 Darius Allen DE; 62 Kwabena Asare G; 84 Juron Criner WR; 92 Evan Gill DT; 41 Money Hunter DB; 34 Pascal Lochard RB; 96 Mike Moore DT; 61 Andrew Peterson T; 68 Jean-Simon Roy G; 4 Jamill Smith SB; 8 Kenny Stafford SB; 32 Nick Taylor DB; 49 James Tuck FB; 75 Nick Usher DE; 87 Derel Walker DE; Italics indicate international player

== Coaching staff ==
Edmonton Eskimos Staff
Front office: President and ceo – Len Rhodes; Vice-president Football Operations & General manager – Brock Sunderland; Executive director of player personnel – Paul Jones; Director of canadian scouting – Rob Ralph; Football Operations Coordinator - Kris Hagerman; Football Operations Coordinator - Nick Pelletier; Head coach: Head coach – Jason Maas; Assistant head coach – Mike Benevides; Offensive coaches: Offensive coordinator – Jason Maas; Offensive line/run game coordinator – Mike Gibson; Quarterbacks/Pass Game Coordinator – Jordan Maksymic; Running backs – Tim Prinsen; Receivers – D. J. McCarthy; Offensive quality control – Kelly Bates	Defensive coaches: Defensive coordinator/linebackers – Mike Benevides; Defensive backs – Barron Miles; Defensive line – Demetrious Maxie; Linebackers assistant – Travis Brown; Defensive quality control – Rob Payne; Special teams coaches: Special teams coordinator – Dave Jackson; → Coaching staff
