= 2017 Edmonton Eskimos season =

60th season for the team in the Canadian Football League

- General manager: Brock Sunderland
- Head coach: Jason Maas
- Home stadium: Commonwealth Stadium

Results
- Record: 12–6
- Division place: 3rd, West
- Playoffs: Lost West Final
- Team MOP: Mike Reilly
- Team MOC: Matt O'Donnell
- Team MOR: Kwaku Boateng

Uniform

The 2017 Edmonton Eskimos season was the 60th season for the team in the Canadian Football League and their 69th overall. The Eskimos qualified for the playoffs for the fourth straight year, but lost the West Final to the Calgary Stampeders. This is the second season under head coach Jason Maas and the first season under new general manager, Brock Sunderland. The team's former general manager, Ed Hervey, was fired on April 7, 2017.

== Offseason ==
=== CFL draft ===
The 2017 CFL draft took place on May 7, 2017.

Round	Pick	Player	Position	School/Club team	Hometown
1	5	Nathaniel Behar	WR	Carleton	London, ON
2	14	Jean-Simon Roy	OL	Laval	Quebec City, QC
3	22	Christophe Mulumba-Tshimanga	LB	Maine	Montreal, QC
4	31	Jordan Hoover	DB	Waterloo	Sault Ste. Marie, ON
5	40	Justin Senior	OL	Mississippi State	Montreal, QC
5	41	Kwaku Boateng	DL	Wilfrid Laurier	Milton, ON
6	49	Kwabena Asare	OL	Carleton	Brampton, ON
8	67	Mark Mackie	DL	McMaster	London, ON

== Preseason ==
Week	Date	Kickoff	Opponent	Results		TV	Venue	Attendance	Summary
Week	Date	Kickoff	Opponent	Score	Record	TV	Venue	Attendance	Summary
A	Sun, June 11	5:00 p.m. MDT	vs. Calgary Stampeders	L 35–36	0–1–0	TSN	Commonwealth Stadium	25,723	Recap
B	Thurs, June 15	6:30 p.m. MDT	at Winnipeg Blue Bombers	T 38–38	0–1–1	None	Investors Group Field	24,934	Recap

== Regular season ==
=== Season standings ===
West Division
Team	GP	W	L	T	Pts	PF	PA	Div	Stk	
Calgary Stampeders	18	13	4	1	27	523	349	7–3	L3	Details
Winnipeg Blue Bombers	18	12	6	0	24	554	492	6–4	W1	Details
Edmonton Eskimos	18	12	6	0	24	510	495	5–5	W5	Details
Saskatchewan Roughriders	18	10	8	0	20	510	430	4–6	L1	Details
BC Lions	18	7	11	0	14	469	501	3–7	L1	Details

=== Season schedule ===
Week	Date	Kickoff	Opponent	Results		TV	Venue	Attendance	Summary
Week	Date	Kickoff	Opponent	Score	Record	TV	Venue	Attendance	Summary
1	Sat, June 24	8:00 p.m. MDT	at BC Lions	W 30–27	1–0	TSN/ESPN2	BC Place	19,175	Recap
2	Fri, June 30	8:00 p.m. MDT	vs. Montreal Alouettes	W 23–19	2–0	TSN/RDS	Commonwealth Stadium	31,828	Recap
3	Bye								
4	Fri, July 14	8:00 p.m. MDT	vs. Ottawa Redblacks	W 23–21	3–0	TSN	Commonwealth Stadium	36,260	Recap
5	Thurs, July 20	5:30 p.m. MDT	at Hamilton Tiger-Cats	W 31–28	4–0	TSN/RDS2	Tim Hortons Field	23,531	Recap
6	Fri, July 28	7:30 p.m. MDT	vs. BC Lions	W 37–26	5–0	TSN/RDS2/ESPN2	Commonwealth Stadium	32,837	Recap
7	Fri, Aug 4	7:30 p.m. MDT	vs. Hamilton Tiger-Cats	W 33–28	6–0	TSN/ESPN2	Commonwealth Stadium	27,078	Recap
8	Thurs, Aug 10	5:30 p.m. MDT	at Ottawa Redblacks	W 27–20	7–0	TSN/RDS	TD Place Stadium	23,851	Recap
9	Thurs, Aug 17	6:30 p.m. MDT	at Winnipeg Blue Bombers	L 26–33	7–1	TSN	Investors Group Field	30,554	Recap
10	Fri, Aug 25	7:30 p.m. MDT	vs. Saskatchewan Roughriders	L 31–54	7–2	TSN	Commonwealth Stadium	41,738*	Recap
11	Mon, Sept 4	1:00 p.m. MDT	at Calgary Stampeders	L 18–39	7–3	TSN	McMahon Stadium	33,731	Recap
12	Sat, Sept 9	7:00 p.m. MDT	vs. Calgary Stampeders	L 22–25	7–4	TSN	Commonwealth Stadium	34,312	Recap
13	Sat, Sept 16	2:00 p.m. MDT	at Toronto Argonauts	L 26–34	7–5	TSN	BMO Field	13,182	Recap
14	Bye								
15	Sat, Sept 30	7:30 p.m. MDT	vs. Winnipeg Blue Bombers	L 19–28	7–6	TSN/RDS2	Commonwealth Stadium	30,524	Recap
16	Mon, Oct 9	12:00 p.m. MDT	at Montreal Alouettes	W 42–24	8–6	TSN/RDS	Molson Stadium	18,849	Recap
17	Sat, Oct 14	8:00 p.m. MDT	vs. Toronto Argonauts	W 30–27	9–6	TSN/RDS2	Commonwealth Stadium	26,738	Recap
18	Sat, Oct 21	8:00 p.m. MDT	at BC Lions	W 35–29 (OT)	10–6	TSN	BC Place	19,816	Recap
19	Sat, Oct 28	5:00 p.m. MDT	vs. Calgary Stampeders	W 29–20	11–6	TSN	Commonwealth Stadium	30,601	Recap
20	Sat, Nov 4	5:00 p.m. MDT	at Saskatchewan Roughriders	W 28–13	12–6	TSN	Mosaic Stadium	31,627	Recap

*Top attendance in CFL

Total attendance: 291,916
Average attendance: 32,435 (57.6%)

== Post-season ==
=== Schedule ===
Game	Date	Kickoff	Opponent	Results		TV	Venue	Attendance	Summary
Game	Date	Kickoff	Opponent	Score	Record	TV	Venue	Attendance	Summary
West Semi-Final	Sun, Nov 12	2:30 p.m. MST	at Winnipeg Blue Bombers	W 39–32	1–0	TSN/RDS/ESPN2	Investors Group Field	27,244	Recap
West Final	Sun, Nov 19	2:30 p.m. MST	at Calgary Stampeders	L 28–32	1–1	TSN/RDS/ESPNews	McMahon Stadium	30,116	Recap

== Roster ==
2017 Edmonton Eskimos final roster
Quarterbacks: 2 James Franklin; 9 Danny O'Brien; 13 Mike Reilly; Running backs: 39 C. J. Gable; 25 Pascal Lochard; 31 Calvin McCarty; 49 James Tuck; Receivers: 3 Natey Adjei; 11 Nate Behar; 4 Adarius Bowman; 15 Vidal Hazelton; 82 Jamill Smith; 87 Derel Walker; 18 Cory Watson; 83 Brandon Zylstra	Offensive linemen: 57 David Beard G/C; 61 Joel Figueroa T; 67 Colin Kelly T; 66 Matt O'Donnell G; 55 Jacob Ruby G/T; 60 Justin Sorensen C; Defensive linemen: 93 Kwaku Boateng DE; 92 Da'Quan Bowers DT; 97 John Chick DE; 94 Euclid Cummings DT; 96 Mike Moore DT; 90 Almondo Sewell DT; 41 Odell Willis DE	Linebackers: 12 Alex Hoffman-Ellis; 40 Kevin Jackson; 45 Korey Jones; 38 Adam Konar; 10 Christophe Mulumba-Tshimanga; 48 Blair Smith; Defensive backs: 20 Johnny Adams; 17 Arjen Colquhoun; 26 Chris Edwards; 36 Aaron Grymes; 35 Forrest Hightower; 28 Jordan Hoover; 43 Neil King; 37 Kenny Ladler; 42 Cauchy Muamba; 7 Josh Woodman	Special teams: 70 Hugh O'Neill P/K; 56 Levi Steinhauer LS; 6 Sean Whyte K/P; Practice roster: 62 Kwabena Asare G; 67 D'Anthony Batiste T/G; 89 Marion Grice RB; 72 A. J. Jefferson DB; 76 Nehemie Kankolongo LB; 95 Kalonji Kashama DE; 14 Zach Kline QB; 71 Brendan Morgan DB; 8 Kenny Stafford SB	Injured list: 33 Terrance Bullitt LB; 86 John Delahunt FB; 44 Alexandre Dupuis FB; 27 Cory Greenwood LB; 50 Danny Groulx G; 91 Marcus Howard DE; 54 Phillip Hunt DE; 53 Ryan King LS; 32 Kendial Lawrence RB; 19 Andrew Lue DB; 29 Mercy Maston DB; 80 Bryant Mitchell WR; 16 Doug Parrish LB; 22 LaDarius Perkins RB; 34 Garry Peters DB; 65 Simeon Rottier G; 68 Jean-Simon Roy G; 47 J. C. Sherritt LB; 24 Brandyn Thompson DB; 5 Travon Van RB; 46 Swayze Waters K/P; 30 John White RB; 81 Duke Williams SB; 23 Marcell Young DB; Italics indicate international player Transactions

== Coaching staff ==
Edmonton Eskimos Staff
Front office: President and ceo – Len Rhodes; Vice-president Football Operations & General manager – Brock Sunderland; Executive director of player personnel – Paul Jones; Director of Canadian scouting – Rob Ralph; Football Operations Coordinator - Kris Hagerman; Football Operations Coordinator - Nick Pelletier; Head coach: Head coach – Jason Maas; Assistant head coach – Mike Benevides; Offensive coaches: Offensive coordinator/receivers coach – Carson Walch; Offensive line/run game coordinator – Mike Gibson; Quarterbacks – Jordan Maksymic; Running backs – Tim Prinsen	Defensive coaches: Defensive coordinator – Mike Benevides; Linebackers – Demetrious Maxie; Defensive backs/player development – Barron Miles; Defensive line – Casey Creehan; Special teams coaches: Special teams coordinator – Cory McDiarmid; Special teams assistant – Dave Jackson; → Coaching staff
