= 2019 Edmonton Eskimos season =

Canadian football team season

- General manager: Brock Sunderland
- Head coach: Jason Maas
- Home stadium: Commonwealth Stadium

Results
- Record: 8–10
- Division place: 4th, West
- Playoffs: Lost East Final
- Team MOP: Trevor Harris
- Team MOC: Kwaku Boateng
- Team MOR: Vontae Diggs

Uniform

The 2019 Edmonton Eskimos season was the 62nd season for the team in the Canadian Football League (CFL) and their 71st overall. This was the fourth season under head coach Jason Maas and the third season under general manager Brock Sunderland. The team finished with an 8–10 record and fourth in the West Division. Notably, the team had a 1–10 record against playoff-bound teams and their 3–7 divisional record included only wins against the BC Lions.

The Eskimos qualified for the playoffs, following a one-year absence, after their week 18 win against the BC Lions on October 12, 2019. The team played in the East Semi-Final, earning a crossover spot in the 2019 playoffs, defeating the Montreal Alouettes in the East Semi-Final, but lost to the Hamilton Tiger-Cats in the East Final.

Following the season, the Eskimos parted ways with head coach Jason Maas. In addition, the 2019 season was the last season where the Eskimos team name was used, with an announcement during the suspended 2020 season the Eskimos name would be discontinued.

== Offseason ==
=== Foreign drafts ===
For the first time in its history, the CFL held drafts for foreign players from Mexico and Europe. Like all other CFL teams, the Eskimos held three non-tradeable selections in the 2019 CFL–LFA draft, which took place on January 14, 2019. The 2019 European CFL draft took place on April 11, 2019 where all teams held one non-tradeable pick.

Draft	Round	Pick	Player	Position	School/Club team
LFA	1	1	Diego Viamontes	WR	Mayas CDMX
LFA	2	10	Daniel Landeros	LB	Dinos de Saltillo
LFA	3	19	Jose Romero	DB	Artilleros de Puebla
Euro	1	4	Maxime Rouyer	LB	McGill

=== CFL draft ===
The 2019 CFL draft took place on May 2, 2019. The Eskimos traded their third-round pick to the Toronto Argonauts for Martese Jackson, but acquired an additional fifth-round pick after trading Shamawd Chambers to the Hamilton Tiger-Cats. Like other CFL teams, the Eskimos held 4 additional non-tradeable selections across the 2019 CFL–LFA draft and 2019 European CFL draft.

Round	Pick	Player	Position	School
1	3	Mathieu Betts	DL	Laval
2	12	Kyle Saxelid	OL	UNLV
4	32	Peter Cender	FB	Grand Valley State
5	40	Shai Ross	WR	Manitoba
5	41	Evan Machibroda	DL	Saskatchewan
6	50	Scott Hutter	DB	Wilfrid Laurier
7	59	Hunter Karl	WR	Calgary
8	68	Eric Blake	DB	McMaster

== Preseason ==
Week	Date	Kickoff	Opponent	Results		TV	Venue	Attendance	Summary
Week	Date	Kickoff	Opponent	Score	Record	TV	Venue	Attendance	Summary
A	Sun, May 26	2:00 p.m. MDT	vs. BC Lions	W 22–7	1–0	None	Commonwealth Stadium	23,549	Recap
B	Fri, May 31	6:30 p.m. MDT	at Winnipeg Blue Bombers	L 3–20	1–1	None	IG Field	19,273	Recap
C	Bye								

== Regular season ==
=== Season standings ===
West Division
Team	GP	W	L	T	Pts	PF	PA	Div	Stk	
Saskatchewan Roughriders	18	13	5	0	26	487	386	7–3	W3	Details
Calgary Stampeders	18	12	6	0	24	482	407	8–2	W1	Details
Winnipeg Blue Bombers	18	11	7	0	22	508	409	7–3	W1	Details
Edmonton Eskimos	18	8	10	0	16	406	400	3–7	L2	Details
BC Lions	18	5	13	0	10	411	452	0–10	L3	Details

=== Season schedule ===
Week	Game	Date	Kickoff	Opponent	Results		TV	Venue	Attendance	Summary
Week	Game	Date	Kickoff	Opponent	Score	Record	TV	Venue	Attendance	Summary
1	1	Fri, June 14	7:00 p.m. MDT	vs. Montreal Alouettes	W 32–25	1–0	TSN/RDS/ESPN2	Commonwealth Stadium	25,263	Recap
2	2	Fri, June 21	7:00 p.m. MDT	vs. BC Lions	W 39–23	2–0	TSN/ESPN2	Commonwealth Stadium	24,016	Recap
3	3	Thu, June 27	6:30 p.m. MDT	at Winnipeg Blue Bombers	L 21–28	2–1	TSN/RDS/ESPN2	IG Field	25,336	Recap
4	Bye									
5	4	Thu, July 11	8:00 p.m. MDT	at BC Lions	W 33–6	3–1	TSN	BC Place	17,026	Recap
6	5	Sat, July 20	2:00 p.m. MDT	at Montreal Alouettes	L 10–20	3–2	TSN/RDS	Molson Stadium	16,137	Recap
7	6	Thu, July 25	7:30 p.m. MDT	vs. Toronto Argonauts	W 26–0	4–2	TSN	Commonwealth Stadium	30,368	Recap
8	7	Sat, Aug 3	5:00 p.m. MDT	at Calgary Stampeders	L 18–24	4–3	TSN	McMahon Stadium	26,597	Recap
9	8	Fri, Aug 9	8:00 p.m. MDT	vs. Ottawa Redblacks	W 16–12	5–3	TSN/ESPN2	Commonwealth Stadium	27,951	Recap
10	9	Fri, Aug 16	5:30 p.m. MDT	at Toronto Argonauts	W 41–26	6–3	TSN/RDS2	BMO Field	16,490	Recap
11	10	Fri, Aug 23	7:00 p.m. MDT	vs. Winnipeg Blue Bombers	L 28–34	6–4	TSN/ESPN2	Commonwealth Stadium	34,217	Recap
12	11	Mon, Sept 2	2:30 p.m. MDT	at Calgary Stampeders	L 9–25	6–5	TSN	McMahon Stadium	32,350	Recap
13	12	Sat, Sept 7	5:00 p.m. MDT	vs. Calgary Stampeders	L 17–33	6–6	TSN/RDS	Commonwealth Stadium	40,113*	Recap
14	Bye									
15	13	Fri, Sept 20	7:30 p.m. MDT	vs. Hamilton Tiger-Cats	L 27–30	6–7	TSN	Commonwealth Stadium	25,694	Recap
16	14	Sat, Sept 28	2:00 p.m. MDT	at Ottawa Redblacks	W 21–16	7–7	TSN/RDS2	TD Place Stadium	23,451	Recap
17	15	Fri, Oct 4	5:00 p.m. MDT	at Hamilton Tiger-Cats	L 12–42	7–8	TSN/ESPN2	Tim Hortons Field	23,411	Recap
18	16	Sat, Oct 12	5:00 p.m. MDT	vs. BC Lions	W 19–6	8–8	TSN	Commonwealth Stadium	27,218	Recap
19	Bye									
20	17	Sat, Oct 26	5:00 p.m. MDT	vs. Saskatchewan Roughriders	L 24–27	8–9	TSN	Commonwealth Stadium	29,228	Recap
21	18	Sat, Nov 2	2:00 p.m. MDT	at Saskatchewan Roughriders	L 13–23	8–10	TSN/RDS2	Mosaic Stadium	29,156	Recap

*Top attendance in CFL

== Post-season ==
=== Schedule ===
Game	Date	Kickoff	Opponent	Results		TV	Venue	Attendance	Summary
Game	Date	Kickoff	Opponent	Score	Record	TV	Venue	Attendance	Summary
East Semi-Final	Sun, Nov 10	11:00 a.m. MST	at Montreal Alouettes	W 37–29	1–0	TSN/RDS/ESPN2	Molson Stadium	21,054	Recap
East Final	Sun, Nov 17	11:00 a.m. MST	at Hamilton Tiger-Cats	L 16–36	1–1	TSN/RDS/ESPNews	Tim Hortons Field	25,177	Recap

== Roster ==
2019 Edmonton Eskimos final roster
**Quarterbacks**: 7 Trevor Harris; 15 Logan Kilgore; 8 Troy Williams; **Running backs**: 25 Shaq Cooper; 39 C. J. Gable; 27 Tanner Green; 31 Calvin McCarty; 49 James Tuck; **Receivers**: 3 Natey Adjei; 13 Ricky Collins; 80 DaVaris Daniels; 82 Greg Ellingson; 18 Kevin Elliott; 84 Jamill Smith; 4 Tevaun Smith	**Offensive linemen**: 57 David Beard C; 67 Colin Kelly T; 66 Matt O'Donnell G/T; 52 Jacob Ruby G; 56 Kyle Saxelid T/G; 63 Josiah St. John T; **Defensive linemen**: 54 Alex Bazzie DE; 9 Mathieu Betts DE; 93 Kwaku Boateng DE; 91 Mark Mackie DT; 96 Mike Moore DT; 90 Almondo Sewell DT; 75 Nick Usher DE; 97 Kendal Vickers DT	**Linebackers**: 11 Larry Dean; 43 Vontae Diggs; 35 Maxime Rouyer; 5 Jovan Santos-Knox; 48 Blair Smith; **Defensive backs**: 16 Jordan Beaulieu; 17 Arjen Colquhoun; 19 Tyquwan Glass; 28 Jordan Hoover; 20 Scott Hutter; 26 Josh Johnson; 23 Godfrey Onyeka; 0 Don Unamba; 29 Brian Walker	**Special teams**: 53 Ryan King LS; 70 Hugh O'Neill P/K; 6 Sean Whyte K/P; **Practice roster**: 62 Kwabena Asare G; 14 Jeremiah Briscoe QB; 46 Peter Cender FB; 99 Jake Ceresna DT; 68 Eric Lofton T; 37 Keon Lyn DB; 34 Jose Romero DB; 61 D. J. Sackey G; 32 Travon Van RB; 89 Diego Viamontes WR	**Injured list**: 58 Travis Bond G/T; 94 Stefan Charles DT; 64 Tommie Draheim T; 12 Forrest Hightower DB; 41 Money Hunter DB; 30 Martese Jackson RB; 22 Christion Jones SB; 92 Jesse Joseph DE; 95 Andrew Marshall DE; 88 Harry McMaster WR; 10 Christophe Mulumba-Tshimanga LB; 24 Anthony Orange DB; 86 Anthony Parker WR; 55 SirVincent Rogers T; 83 Shai Ross WR; 33 Alex Taylor RB; 38 Jonathan Walton LB; **Suspended**: 40 Maurice McKnight DB; 63 David Perkins DE; -- Malik Richards WR; Italics indicate international player **Bold** indicates global player

== Coaching staff ==
Edmonton Eskimos Staff
Front office: President and ceo – Len Rhodes; Vice-President Football Operations & General Manager – Brock Sunderland; Director of player personnel – David Turner; Assistant director of player personnel – Will Homer; Director of scouting – Bobby Merritt; Director of football operations – Kris Hagerman; Assistant director of football operations/player personnel assistant – Nick Pelletier; Head video coordinator – Griffin Dear; Head coach: Head coach – Jason Maas; Assistant head coach – Mike Gibson; Offensive coaches: Offensive coordinator/quarterbacks – Jordan Maksymic; Offensive line – Mike Gibson; Running backs – Tim Prinsen; Receivers – Jason Tucker	Defensive coaches: Defensive coordinator – Phillip Lolley; Linebackers – Travis Brown; Defensive backs – Barron Miles; Defensive line – Demetrious Maxie; Defensive assistant – William Fields; Special teams coaches: Special teams coordinator – A. J. Gass; → Coaching staff
