= Kenny Stafford =

American football player (born 1990)

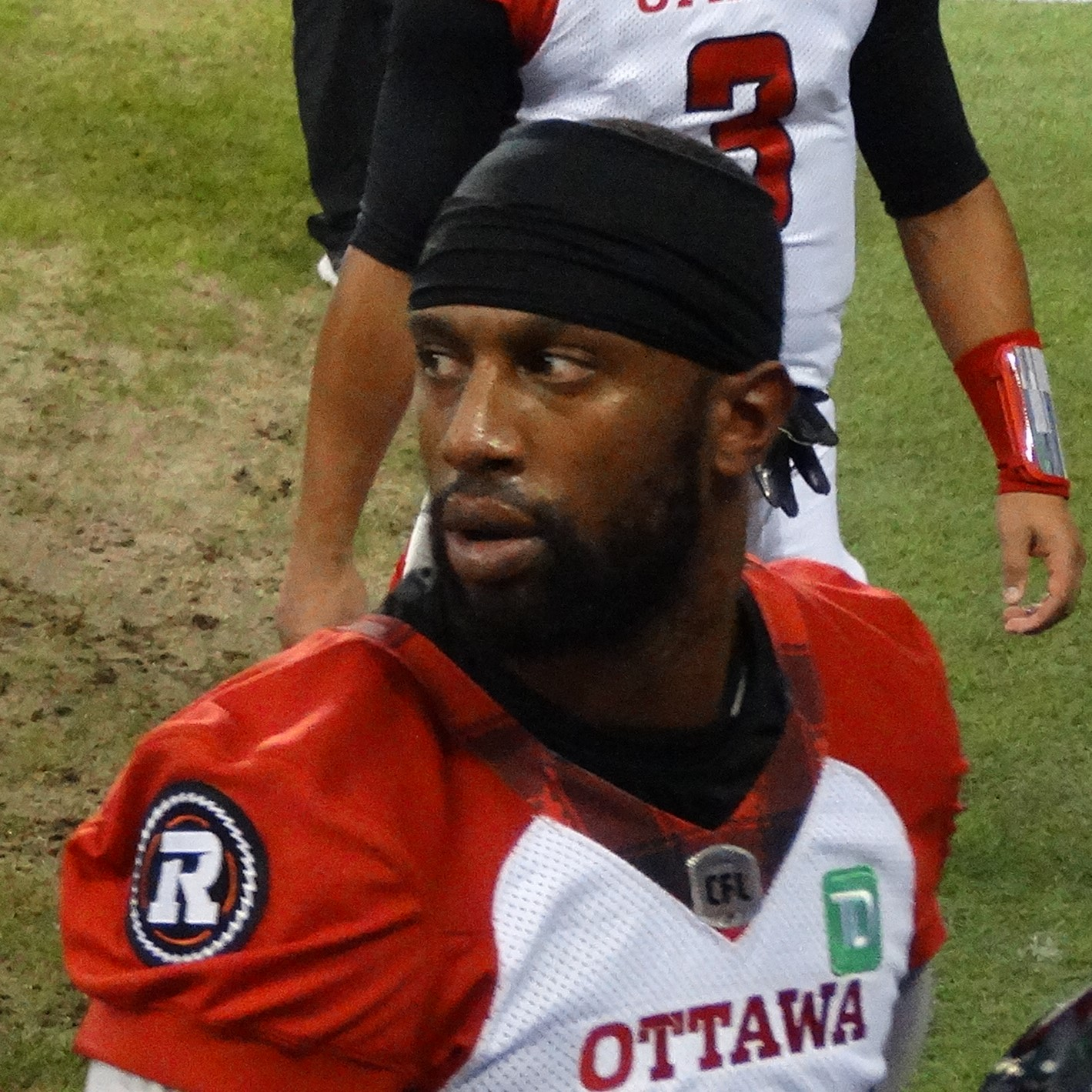
- Stafford with the Ottawa Redblacks in 2021

Profile
- Position: Wide receiver

Personal information
- Born: April 20, 1990 (age 36); Columbus, Ohio, U.S.
- Listed height: 6 ft 3 in (1.91 m)
- Listed weight: 204 lb (93 kg)

Career information
- High school: St. Francis DeSales (OH)
- College: Toledo

Career history
- 2012: Atlanta Falcons*
- 2013: Pittsburgh Power
- 2013: Montreal Alouettes*
- 2013: Miami Dolphins*
- 2013: Calgary Stampeders
- 2014: Montreal Alouettes
- 2015: Edmonton Eskimos
- 2016: Montreal Alouettes
- 2017: Winnipeg Blue Bombers*
- 2017–2019: Edmonton Eskimos
- 2019–2020: Saskatchewan Roughriders
- 2021: Edmonton Elks*
- 2021: Ottawa Redblacks
- * Offseason or practice squad member only

Awards and highlights
- Grey Cup champion (2015)
- Stats at CFL.ca
- Stats at ArenaFan.com

Kenny Stafford (born April 20, 1990) is an American former professional football wide receiver. He was a member of the Atlanta Falcons and Miami Dolphins of the National Football League (NFL), the Pittsburgh Power of the Arena Football League (AFL), and the Montreal Alouettes, Calgary Stampeders, Edmonton Eskimos, Winnipeg Blue Bombers, Saskatchewan Roughriders, and Ottawa Redblacks of the Canadian Football League (CFL). He is the nephew of Pro Football Hall of Fame inductee Cris Carter.

== College career ==
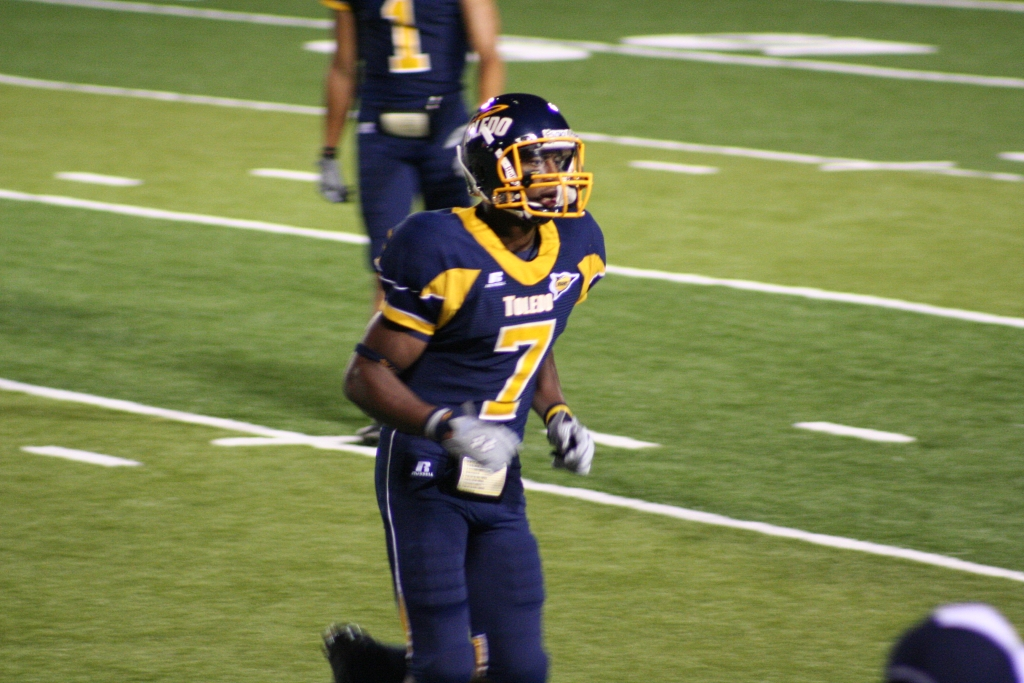
Stafford with Toledo in 2008

Stafford played collegiately for the University of Toledo.

== Professional career ==
=== Atlanta Falcons ===
Stafford was signed as an undrafted free agent with the Atlanta Falcons.

=== Pittsburgh Power ===
Stafford signed with the Arena Football League's Pittsburgh Power for the 2013 season. Stafford played in one game with the Power, recording 6 receptions for 109 yards and two touchdowns.

=== Montreal Alouettes (first stint) ===
Stafford was placed on the other league exempt list by the Power when he signed with the Canadian Football League's Montreal Alouettes. However, he did not make an appearance with the Alouettes at this time.

=== Miami Dolphins ===
Stafford was signed by the Miami Dolphins on July 19, 2013. On August 23, 2013, he was waived by the Dolphins.

=== Calgary Stampeders ===
Stafford signed with the Calgary Stampeders on August 28, 2013. Stafford caught 6 passes for 37 yards in 3 games for the Stamps during the 2013 CFL season. He was released by the Stampeders on November 18, 2013.

=== Montreal Alouettes (second stint) ===
Stafford played for the Alouettes during the 2014 season. During said season he caught 20 passes for 230 receiving yards and 1 touchdown.

=== Edmonton Eskimos (first stint) ===
In the CFL off-season Stafford was traded to the Edmonton Eskimos in exchange for Fred Stamps on January 16, 2015. He had a breakout season with the Eskimos playing in all 18 regular season games and all 3 playoffs games including the 103rd Grey Cup game. During the season Stafford caught 47 passes for 732 yards and 9 touchdowns (all career highs).

=== Montreal Alouettes (third stint) ===
Upon entering free agency on February 9, 2016, Stafford signed a one-year deal with the Alouettes. On September 13, 2016 Kenny Stafford and fellow wide receiver Duron Carter, Stafford's cousin, got into a heated exchange at practice with newly promoted quarterback Rakeem Cato. On October 17, 2016 Stafford was released by the Al's alongside Duron Carter. Stafford played in 9 games during the 2016 season, catching 16 passes for 215 yards with 2 touchdowns.

=== Winnipeg Blue Bombers ===
On January 17, 2017, Stafford signed as a free agent with the Winnipeg Blue Bombers of the Canadian Football League. Stafford was cut by the Bombers on June 17, 2017; the league's final roster cut-down day.

=== Edmonton Eskimos (second stint) ===
Later that same day Stafford signed a practice roster deal with the Eskimos. Stafford played a season and a half with the Eskimos, catching a career high 55 receptions for 781 yards during the 2018 season. In seven games with Edmonton the following season he caught 30 passes for 366 yards with 2 touchdowns.

=== Saskatchewan Roughriders ===
On August 5, 2019, Stafford was traded to the Saskatchewan Roughriders in exchange for kick returner Christion Jones. He did not play in a game for the Roughriders and was released on January 20, 2021.

=== Edmonton Elks ===
Stafford signed with the Edmonton Elks on June 23, 2021. He was released on July 21, 2021.

=== Ottawa Redblacks ===
On September 13, 2021, it was announced that Stafford had signed with the Ottawa Redblacks. He played in eight games for the Redblacks during the 2021 season, catching 17 passes for 242 yards with three touchdowns. Stafford was released by the Redblacks on January 13, 2022.

== Career statistics ==
		Receiving
Year	Team	GP	Rec	Yards	Avg	Long	TD
2013	CGY	4	6	37	6.4	10	0
2014	MTL	10	20	230	11.5	49	1
2015	EDM	18	47	732	15.6	55	9
2016	MTL	9	16	215	13.4	48	2
2017	EDM	5	20	265	13.3	70	2
2018	EDM	17	55	781	14.2	55	2
2019	EDM	7	30	366	12.2	28	2
2021	OTT	8	17	242	14.2	47	3
CFL totals		78	211	2,868	13.6	70	21
