= Draheim (surname) =

Draheim is a surname. Notable people with the surname include:

- Jeff Draheim (born 1963), American film editor
- Sue Draheim (1949–2013), American fiddler
- Tommie Draheim (born 1988), American football player
- William Draheim (1898–1976), American politician
