= Nick Taylor (Canadian football) =

American gridiron football player (born 1988)

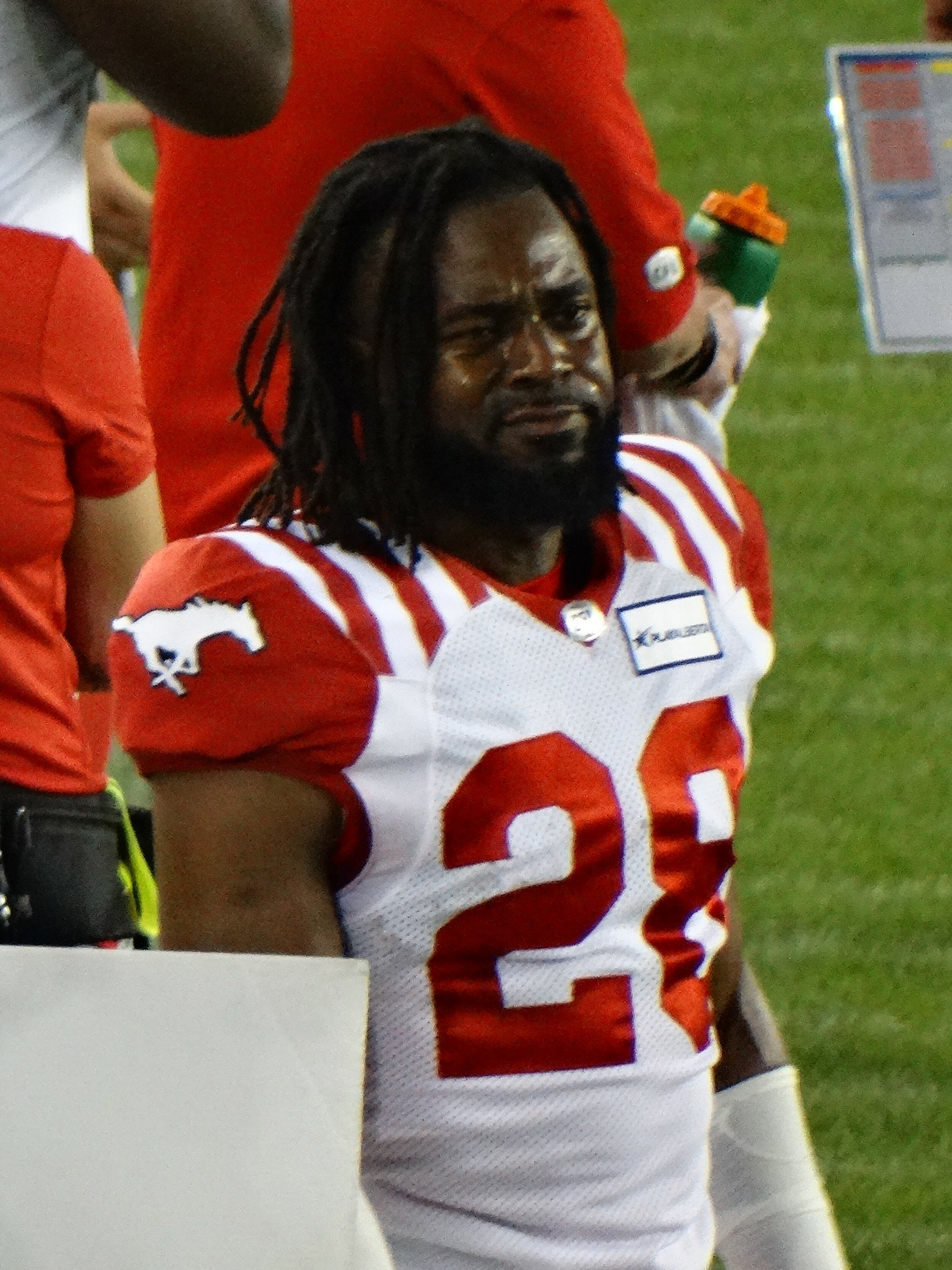
- Taylor with the Calgary Stampeders in 2023

Profile
- Position: Defensive back

Personal information
- Born: March 27, 1988 (age 38); Hollywood, Florida, U.S.
- Listed height: 5 ft 8 in (1.73 m)
- Listed weight: 181 lb (82 kg)

Career information
- College: Florida International

Career history
- 2012: Minnesota Vikings
- 2014: New York Jets*
- 2015: Orlando Predators
- 2016–2017: Ottawa Redblacks
- 2018–2019: Edmonton Eskimos
- 2019–2022: Winnipeg Blue Bombers
- 2023: Calgary Stampeders
- 2024: Winnipeg Blue Bombers
- * Offseason or practice squad member only

Awards and highlights
- 3× Grey Cup champion (2016, 2019, 2021)
- Stats at Pro Football Reference
- Stats at CFL.ca

Nick Taylor (born March 27, 1988) is an American professional football defensive back. He is a three-time Grey Cup champion after winning with Ottawa Redblacks in 2016 and with the Winnipeg Blue Bombers in 2019 and 2021.

== College career ==
Taylor did not play college football, but rather played college basketball for the FIU Panthers at the point guard position.

== Professional career ==
=== Early career ===
Taylor was originally signed as a free agent in 2012 by the Minnesota Vikings of the National Football League (NFL), but he suffered a shoulder injury and was released. He was signed by the New York Jets for the 2014 season, but was released without playing a regular season game. He later played for the Orlando Predators in 2015.

=== Ottawa Redblacks ===
On March 4, 2016, Taylor signed with the Ottawa Redblacks. He spent two seasons with the Redblacks and was on the reserve list when the Redblacks won the Grey Cup in 2016.

=== Edmonton Eskimos ===
On February 14, 2018, Taylor signed with the Edmonton Eskimos. In 2018, he played and started in 15 regular season games where he had 46 defensive tackles, two special teams tackles, five pass knockdowns, and one sack. In the following season, he served for three games in a backup capacity, recording one forced fumble, and was released mid-season on August 8, 2019.

=== Winnipeg Blue Bombers (first stint) ===
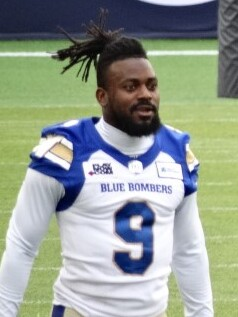
Taylor with the Winnipeg Blue Bombers in 2022

Taylor signed with the Winnipeg Blue Bombers to a practice roster agreement on August 19, 2019. He played in four regular season games where he recorded five defensive tackles, one special teams tackle, three pass knockdowns, one forced fumble, and one interception that he returned for a touchdown. In the team's two playoff games, he had six defensive tackles and an interception, helping the Blue Bombers qualify for the Grey Cup. In the 107th Grey Cup game, Taylor had one defensive tackle and two kickoff returns for 46 yards as he won his second Grey Cup championship. He did not play in 2020 due to the cancellation of the 2020 CFL season.

Taylor signed a one-year contract extension with the Winnipeg Blue Bombers on January 7, 2021. He played in 12 regular season games and both post-season games as he won his third Grey Cup following the Blue Bombers' 108th Grey Cup victory. On February 14, 2023, Taylor became a free agent.

=== Calgary Stampeders ===
On April 21, 2023, Taylor signed with the Calgary Stampeders. He played in 11 regular season games where he had 25 defensive tackles, one interception, and one forced fumble. He became a free agent upon the expiry of his contract on February 13, 2024.

=== Winnipeg Blue Bombers (second stint) ===
After sitting out most of the 2024 CFL season, Taylor signed with the Blue Bombers to a practice roster agreement on October 21, 2024. He did not play in the team's remaining regular season game, but was activated for the West Final where he recorded four defensive tackles. Taylor played in the 111th Grey Cup as a backup defensive back, but managed to record five defensive tackles in the team's loss to the Toronto Argonauts. He became a free agent in the following offseason on February 11, 2025.
