= Nick Usher =

American gridiron football player (born 1995)

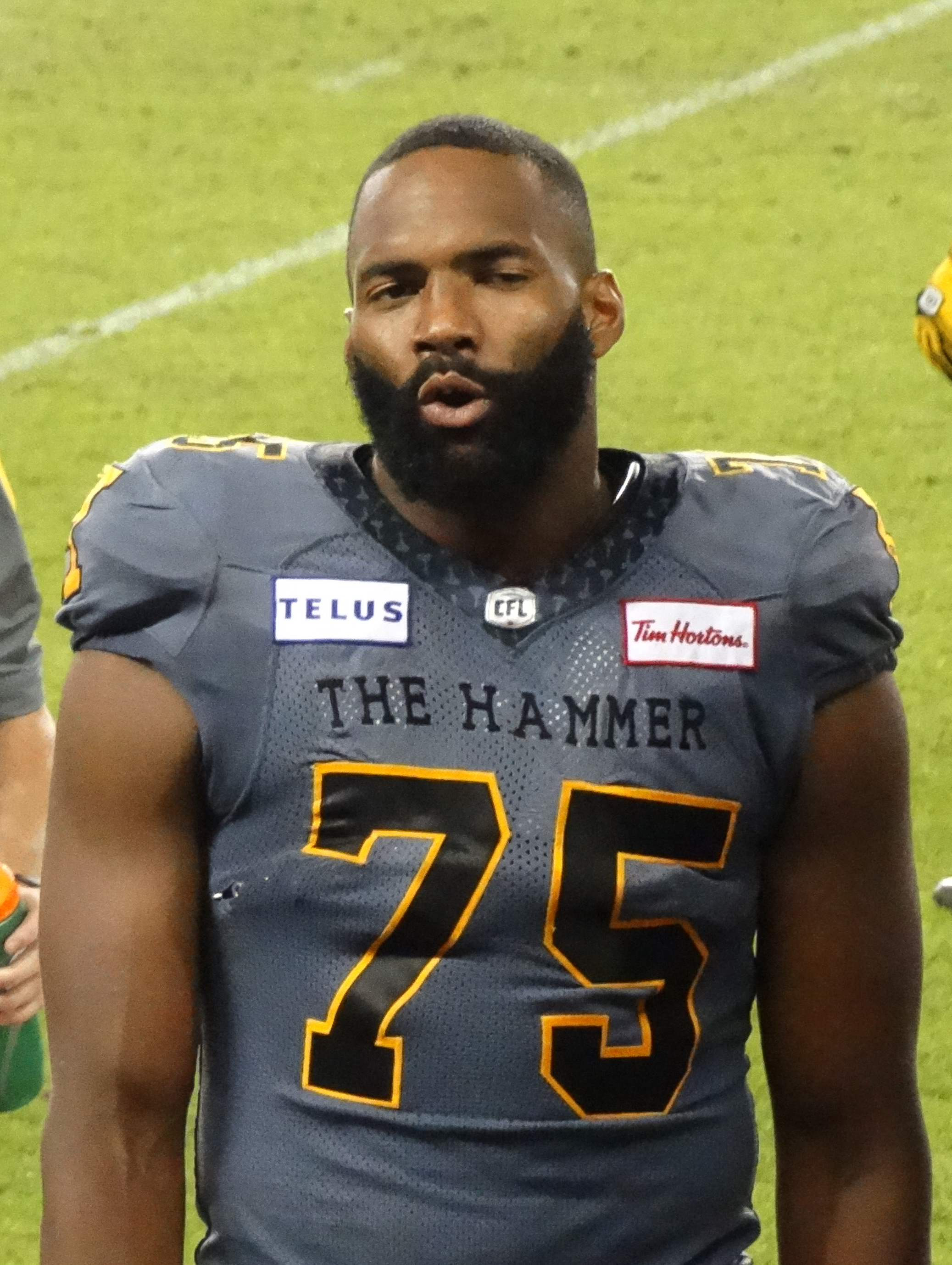
- Usher with the Hamilton Tiger-Cats in 2024

Profile
- Position: Defensive lineman

Personal information
- Born: January 22, 1995 (age 31); Los Angeles, California, U.S.
- Listed height: 6 ft 3 in (1.91 m)
- Listed weight: 235 lb (107 kg)

Career information
- High school: Serra High
- College: UTEP

Career history
- 2017: Seattle Seahawks*
- 2017: New England Patriots*
- 2018–2019: Edmonton Eskimos
- 2020: Las Vegas Raiders*
- 2021–2023: Montreal Alouettes
- 2023: BC Lions
- 2024: Hamilton Tiger-Cats
- * Offseason or practice squad member only
- Stats at Pro Football Reference
- Stats at CFL.ca

Nicholas F. Usher (born January 22, 1995) is an American professional football defensive lineman.

== College career ==
Usher played college football for the UTEP Miners from 2013 to 2016. He spent the first three seasons as a defensive lineman before moving to linebacker in his senior year.

== Professional career ==
=== Seattle Seahawks ===
After not being selected in the 2017 NFL draft, Usher signed with the Seattle Seahawks as an undrafted free agent on May 12, 2017. However, he was released before the start of preseason on July 29, 2017.

=== New England Patriots ===
On August 28, 2017, Usher signed with the New England Patriots. He played in one pre-season game and was released with the final training camp cuts that year.

=== Edmonton Eskimos ===
On October 4, 2017, Usher signed a practice roster agreement with the Edmonton Eskimos and later a futures contract for the 2018 season. He played in his first professional game on July 13, 2018, against the Toronto Argonauts where he recorded three defensive tackles. That year, he played in eight regular season games where he had seven defensive tackles, three special teams tackles, one sack, and one forced fumble.

In 2019, Usher played in all 18 regular season games where he had 36 defensive tackles, six sacks, and three forced fumbles. He also played in his first career post-season games, in the East Semi-Final and East Final, the latter of which the Eskimos lost to the Hamilton Tiger-Cats. He was granted an early release on January 2, 2020, in order to sign with a National Football League team.

=== Las Vegas Raiders ===
Usher signed with the Las Vegas Raiders in January 2020, but was waived during training camp with an injury designation on August 24, 2020.

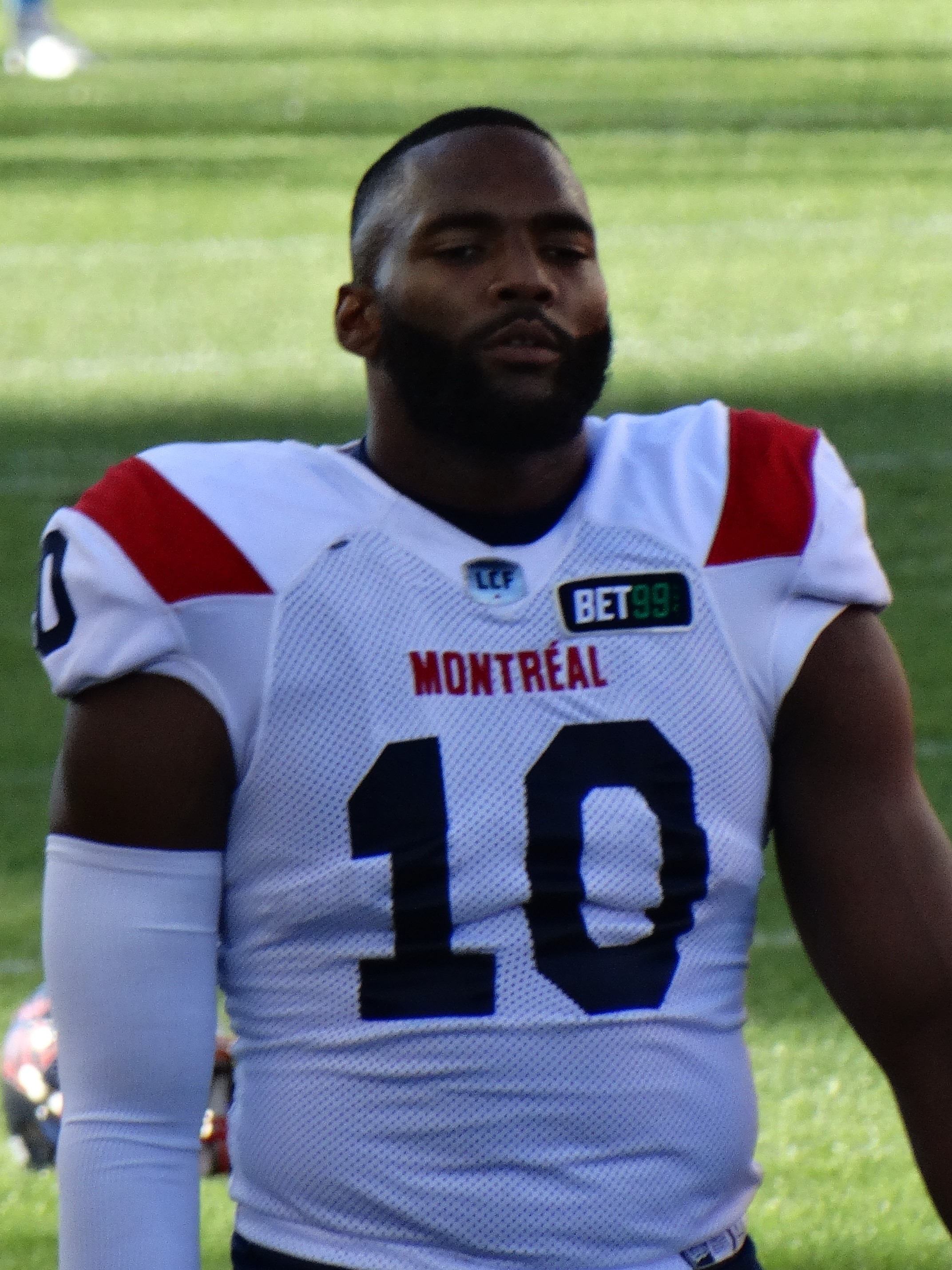
Usher with the Montreal Alouettes in 2022

=== Montreal Alouettes ===
On February 9, 2021, it was announced that Usher had signed with the Montreal Alouettes. In a pandemic-shortened 2021 season, Usher played in all 14 regular season games where he had 35 defensive tackles, five sacks, and one forced fumble.

Usher signed a two-year contract extension with the Alouettes on January 24, 2022. For the 2022 season, he played in 13 regular season games where he had 29 defensive tackles and three sacks. In 2023, he started in the first five games for the Alouettes, recording five defensive tackles and a sack, before being released on July 23, 2023.

=== BC Lions ===
On August 15, 2023, Usher signed a practice roster agreement with the BC Lions. He played in four regular season games where he had one defensive tackle. He became a free agent upon the expiry of his contract on February 13, 2024.

=== Hamilton Tiger-Cats ===
On February 20, 2024, Usher signed with the Hamilton Tiger-Cats.

== Personal life ==
Usher was born in Los Angeles, California, to parents Norman and Geraldine Usher. He has one brother and one sister.
