= Jean-Simon Roy =

Canadian football player (born 1993)

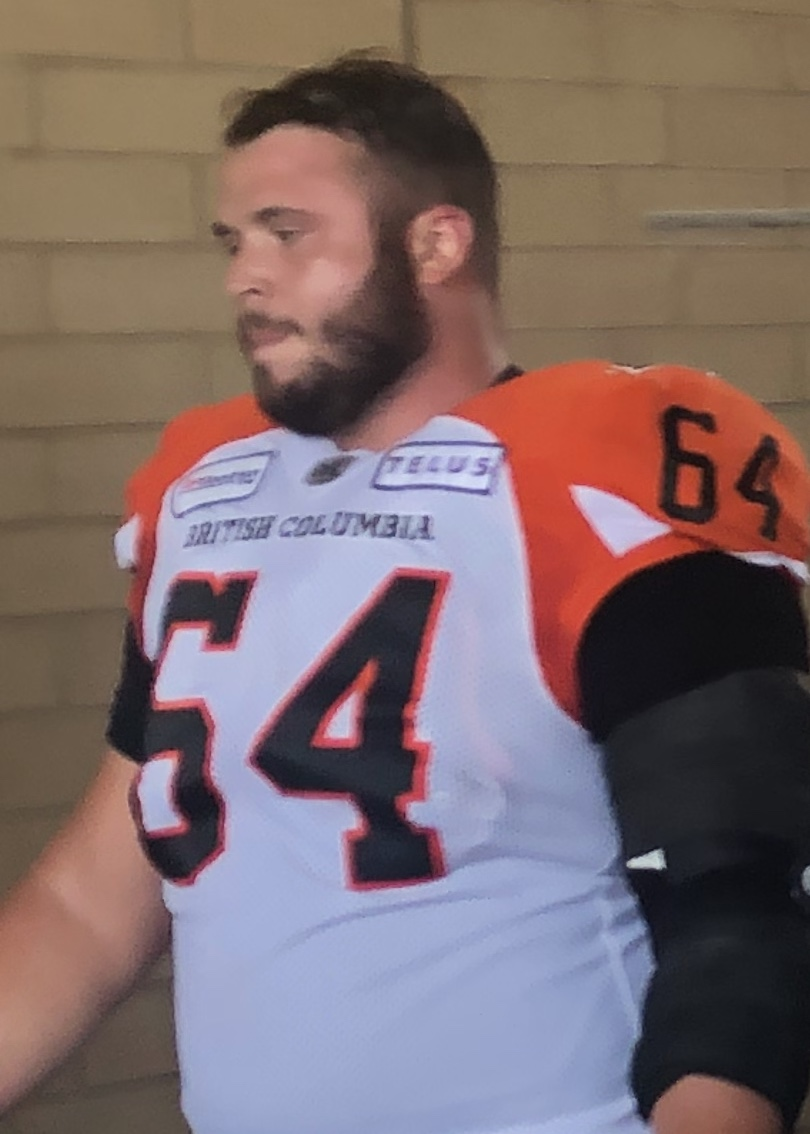
- Roy with the BC Lions in 2019

No. 64
- Position: Offensive lineman

Personal information
- Born: November 20, 1993 (age 32); Stoneham, Quebec, Canada
- Listed height: 6 ft 3 in (1.91 m)
- Listed weight: 295 lb (134 kg)

Career information
- University: Laval
- CFL draft: 2017: 2nd round, 14th overall pick

Career history
- 2017–2019: Edmonton Eskimos
- 2019: BC Lions
- 2020–2021: Edmonton Football Team / Elks*
- * Offseason or practice squad member only

Awards and highlights
- 2× Vanier Cup champion (2013, 2016); First-team All-Canadian (2016)
- Stats at CFL.ca

Jean-Simon Roy (born November 20, 1993) is a Canadian former professional football offensive lineman. He is a two-time Vanier Cup champion, having won with the Laval Rouge et Or in 2013 and 2016.

== University career ==
Roy played U Sports football for the Laval Rouge et Or from 2013 to 2016. He was a member of the 49th Vanier Cup championship team in his rookie year and also won the 52nd Vanier Cup in his final year in 2016. He was also named a U Sports First Team All-Canadian in 2016 at the offensive tackle position.

== Professional career ==
Pre-draft measurables
Height	Weight	40-yard dash	20-yard shuttle	Three-cone drill	Vertical jump	Broad jump	Bench press
6 ft 2 5/8 in (1.90 m)	287 lb (130 kg)	5.57 s	4.89 s	8.11 s	22.5 in (0.57 m)	8 ft 0 1/4 in (2.44 m)	39 reps
All values from CFL Combine

=== Edmonton Eskimos ===
In the 2017 CFL draft, Roy was selected in the second round, 14th overall, by the Edmonton Eskimos and signed with the team on May 25, 2017. He began the season on the injured list before moving to the reserve roster for two games. He then dressed in his first professional football game on August 10, 2017 in a game against the Ottawa Redblacks. He dressed in two total games in 2017 while spending the rest of the season on the injured list. In 2018, he dressed in one regular season game while splitting time between the reserve roster and the injured list. To begin the 2019 season, Roy was placed on the team's practice roster.

=== BC Lions ===
On June 11, 2019, it was announced that Roy had been claimed by the BC Lions from the Eskimos' practice roster and that Roy had agreed to join the Lions' active roster. He dressed as a back-up offensive lineman in the first two regular season games in 2019 before making his first professional start, playing at centre, in week 3 against the Calgary Stampeders. He played in seven of the first ten games of the season and spent the rest of the year on the injured list. He became a free agent on February 11, 2020.

=== Edmonton Eskimos / Elks ===
On the first day of free agency, on February 11, 2020, Roy signed with the Edmonton Eskimos. Due to the cancellation of the 2020 CFL season, Roy did not play in 2020 and signed an extension with Edmonton on December 30, 2020. He retired from football on June 28, 2021.
