= Monshadrik Hunter =

American football player (born 1995)

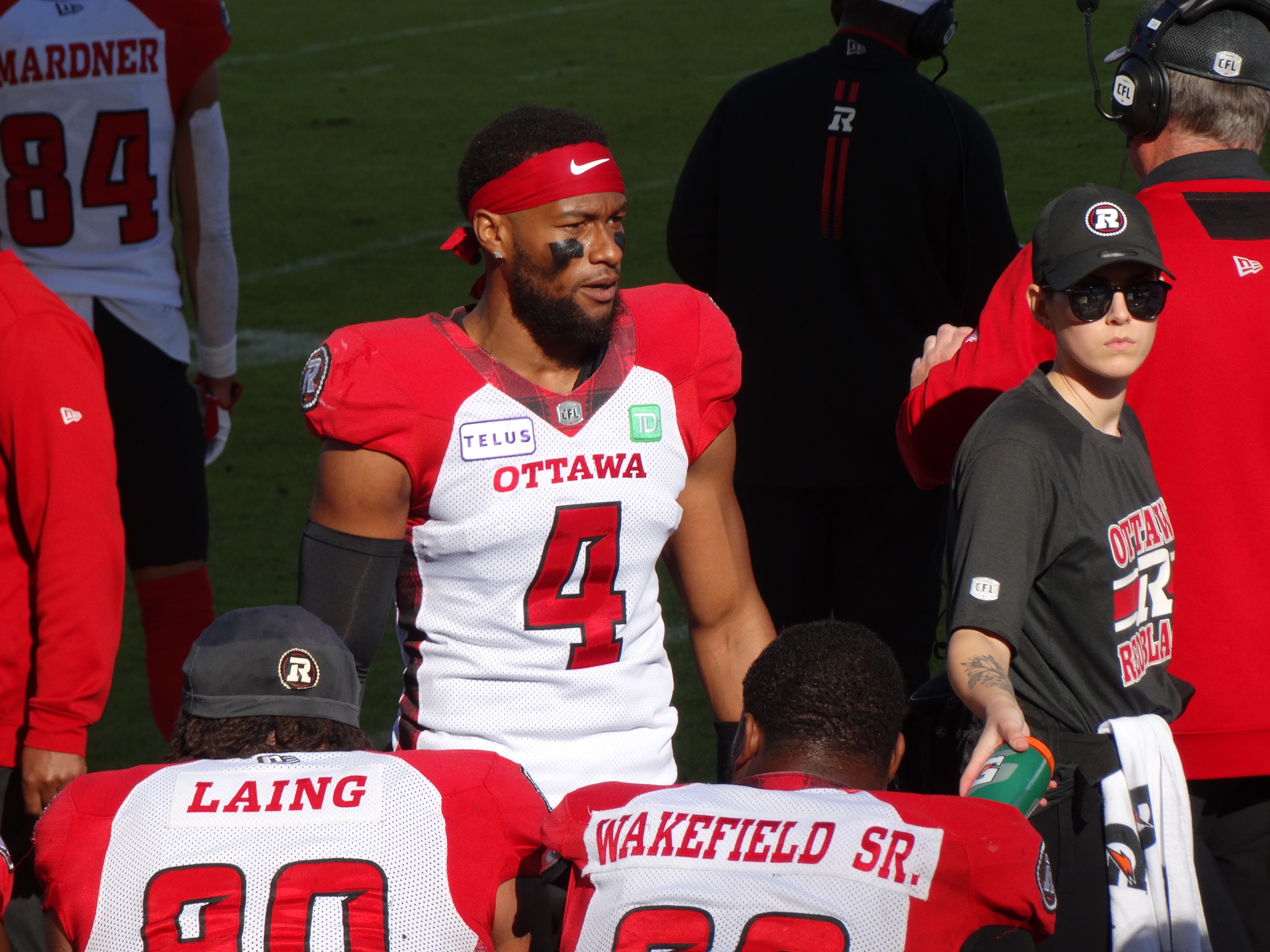
- Hunter with the Ottawa Redblacks in 2024

Profile
- Position: Defensive back

Personal information
- Born: July 11, 1995 (age 31); Prosper, Texas, U.S.
- Listed height: 6 ft 1 in (1.85 m)
- Listed weight: 193 lb (88 kg)

Career information
- High school: Prosper
- College: Arkansas State (2013–2016)
- NFL draft: 2017: undrafted

Career history
- 2018–2019: Edmonton Eskimos
- 2020–2021: Montreal Alouettes
- 2022–2024: Ottawa Redblacks

Awards and highlights
- CFL East All-Star (2021); First-team All-Sun Belt (2016)
- Stats at CFL.ca

Monshadrik "Money" Hunter (born July 11, 1995) is an American professional football defensive back. He has been a member of the Edmonton Eskimos, Montreal Alouettes, and Ottawa Redblacks of the Canadian Football League (CFL). He played college football for the Arkansas State Red Wolves.

== College career ==
Hunter played college football for the Arkansas State Red Wolves from 2013 to 2016. He played in 59 games with the team where he had 222 defensive tackles, six interceptions, and one sack.

== Professional career ==
=== Edmonton Eskimos ===
Hunter did not play in 2017 due to a foot injury he had suffered in his final college season. He then signed with the Edmonton Eskimos on February 6, 2018. He played in 12 regular season games in 2018, with nine starts, where he had 26 defensive tackles, nine special tackles, and two interceptions.

After becoming a full-time starter at halfback in 2019, Hunter played in all 18 regular season games where he had 59 defensive tackles, two special teams tackles, one sack, and two interceptions. He became a free agent upon the expiry of his contract on February 11, 2020.

=== Montreal Alouettes ===
Shortly after becoming a free agent, Hunter signed with the Montreal Alouettes on February 12, 2020. However, the 2020 CFL season was cancelled and he did not play in 2020.

In 2021, Hunter played in all 14 regular season games and recorded 44 defensive tackles, two interceptions, and one sack. He was named a Divisional All-Star for the first time in his career at the end of the season. He became a free agent upon the expiry of his contract on February 8, 2022.

=== Ottawa Redblacks ===
On February 9, 2022, it was announced that Hunter had signed with the Ottawa Redblacks. In his first season in Ottawa Hunter contributed with 38 defensive tackles and four interceptions. On January 31, 2023, Hunter and the Redblacks agreed to a one-year contract extension. In late May 2023, the team announced that Hunter had suffered a torn pectoral muscle in practice and would miss the start of the season.

== Personal life ==
Hunter's father, Torii Hunter, is a former Major League Baseball player. He has three half-brothers, Torii Hunter Jr., Cameron Hunter, and Darius McClinton-Hunter. Hunter has two daughters, Miya & A’Mora.
