= Eric Lofton =

American gridiron football player (born 1993)

No. 55
- Position: Offensive lineman

Personal information
- Born: March 6, 1993 (age 33); Philadelphia, Pennsylvania, U.S.
- Listed height: 6 ft 4 in (1.93 m)
- Listed weight: 300 lb (136 kg)

Career information
- High school: Rancocas Valley (Mount Holly, New Jersey)
- College: Temple

Career history
- Ottawa Redblacks (2017–2018); BC Lions (2019)*; Edmonton Eskimos / Football Team (2019–2020); Winnipeg Blue Bombers (2022); Saskatchewan Roughriders (2023); Winnipeg Blue Bombers (2024–2025); Hamilton Tiger-Cats (2026)*
- * Offseason or practice squad member only

Awards and highlights
- First team All-AAC (2015)
- Stats at CFL.ca

Eric Lofton (born March 6, 1993) is an American professional football offensive lineman. He played college football at Temple.

== Early life ==
Raised in Lumberton, New Jersey, Lofton played offensive tackle and tight end for the Red Devils at Rancocas Valley High School. In addition to football, Lofton was also a member of the wrestling team.

== College career ==
At Temple, Lofton redshirted the 2011 season. Over the next four years, he played in 37 games. He was named a first-team All-American Athletic Conference selection as a senior in 2015.

Lofton graduated with a degree in economics.

== Professional career ==
After graduation, Lofton had tryouts with several professional teams, including the Philadelphia Eagles, Philadelphia Soul, and the Montreal Alouettes. Before landing with a team, Lofton worked for Freedom Mortgage in South Jersey.

=== Ottawa Redblacks ===
On February 27, 2017, Lofton was signed by the Ottawa Redblacks. He earned a roster spot with the team after making it out of training camp. In two seasons with Ottawa, Lofton saw action in four games (one in 2017, three in 2018), spending most of his time on the practice squad.

=== BC Lions ===
Lofton signed with the BC Lions on February 8, 2019. On June 8, 2019, Lofton was released before the start of season.

=== Edmonton Eskimos / Football Team ===
On July 8, 2019, Lofton was signed to the Edmonton Eskimos practice squad. Lofton appeared in two games during the 2019 season. He did not play any games in 2020 because of the cancellation of the CFL season due to COVID-19. Lofton signed a contract extension with Edmonton on December 30, 2020. He was released on May 24, 2021.

=== Winnipeg Blue Bombers (first stint) ===
On March 22, 2022, it was announced that he had signed a one-year contract with the Winnipeg Blue Bombers. He played in one game that season.

=== Saskatchewan Roughriders ===
On February 10, 2023, it was announced that Lofton had signed with the Saskatchewan Roughriders. He played 14 games that season for the Roughriders. He became a free agent upon the expiry of his contract on February 13, 2024.

=== Winnipeg Blue Bombers (second stint) ===
On February 16, 2024, Lofton signed with the Blue Bombers. He became a free agent upon the expiry of his contract on February 10, 2026.

=== Hamilton Tiger-Cats ===
On February 10, 2026, it was announced that Lofton had signed with the Hamilton Tiger-Cats. He was released on May 31 as part of final roster cuts.
