= Shai Ross =

Canadian football player (born 1993)

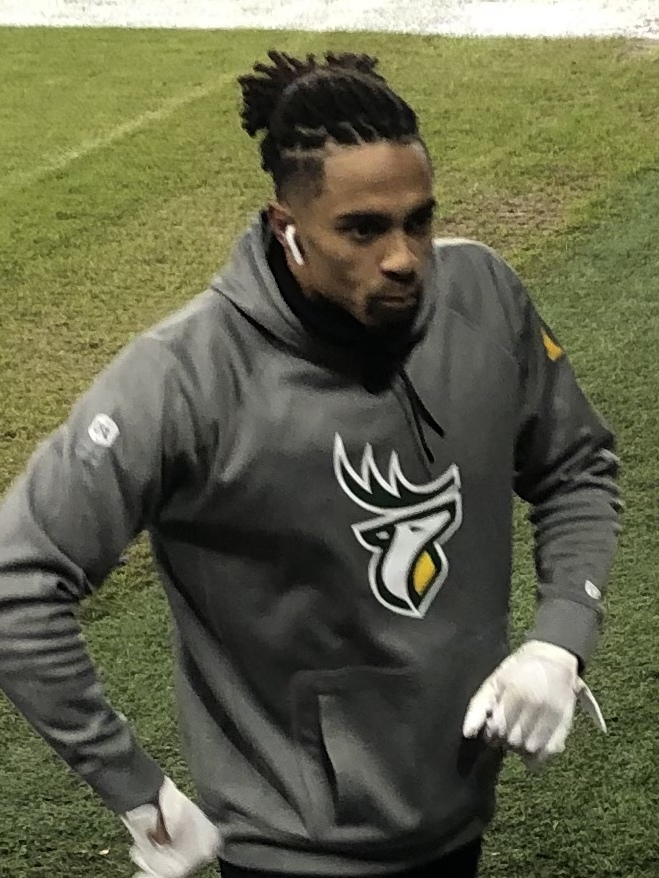
- Ross with the Edmonton Elks in 2021

Profile
- Position: Wide receiver

Personal information
- Born: September 17, 1993 (age 33); Winnipeg, Manitoba, Canada
- Listed height: 6 ft 0 in (1.83 m)
- Listed weight: 180 lb (82 kg)

Career information
- High school: Dakota Collegiate
- CJFL: Okanagan Sun
- University: Manitoba
- CFL draft: 2019: 5th round, 40th overall pick

Career history
- 2019–2022: Edmonton Eskimos / Elks
- 2022: BC Lions

Career CFL statistics
- Receptions: 27
- Rec yards: 369
- Rec average: 13.7
- Rec Touchdowns: 4
- Stats at CFL.ca

Shai Ross (born September 17, 1993) is a Canadian former professional football wide receiver.

== Amateur career ==
Ross first played football in his senior year while attending Dakota Collegiate. After graduating, he then played major junior football for the St. Vital Mustangs in 2014 where he was named an all-star. He was then invited to play for the Manitoba Bisons in 2015, but instead chose to play in the Canadian Junior Football League for the Okanagan Sun in 2015, where he played in the Canadian Bowl that year. Ross then joined the Bisons in 2016 to play U Sports football where he was a Canada West All-Star at kick returner that year. He played two more years with the Bisons and finished his university career having played in 22 regular season games and recording 73 receptions for 1,197 yards and 10 touchdowns.

== Professional career ==
Pre-draft measurables
Height	Weight	40-yard dash	20-yard shuttle	Three-cone drill	Vertical jump	Broad jump
5 ft 11 in (1.80 m)	181 lb (82 kg)	4.63 s	4.08 s	7.00 s	38.5 in (0.98 m)	11 ft 5 1/2 in (3.49 m)
All values from CFL Combine

=== Edmonton Eskimos / Elks ===
In the Canadian Football League's Western Regional Combine, Ross finished first in four of the six testing categories and impressed scouts enough to earn an invitation to the National Combine. Among the top prospects for the 2019 CFL draft, he finished first in the Broad Jump and Shuttle Drill and in second place in the Vertical Jump and 3-Cone Drill. He then attended mini-camp with the New York Giants, but was not offered a contract.

Ross was drafted in the fifth round, 40th overall, by the Edmonton Eskimos and signed with the team on May 15, 2019. Following training camp, he made the team's active roster and played in his first professional game on June 14, 2019, in a win against the Montreal Alouettes. He played in five regular season games in 2019, where he was utilized as a kick returner and had one punt return for 20 yards and two kick returns for 48 yards. He finished the season on the team's injured list.

With the 2020 CFL season cancelled due to the COVID-19 pandemic in Canada, Ross did not play in 2020. In anticipation of the 2021 season, he signed a contract extension with Edmonton on February 1, 2021, through to the 2022 season. He again made the team's opening day roster and recorded his first career reception in the first game of the season on August 7, 2021, against the Ottawa Redblacks. In the following week's game, on August 14, 2021, he scored his first career professional touchdown on an 11-yard pass from Trevor Harris against the Montreal Alouettes. He played in all 14 regular season games and recorded 27 receptions for 369 yards and four touchdowns.

In 2022, Ross played in the first two regular season games, but did not record a reception. He was released on June 21, 2022.

=== BC Lions ===
On June 23, 2022, it was announced that Ross had signed with the BC Lions. He became a free agent after the 2022 season.

== Personal life ==
Shai used to enjoy skateboarding at the local skatepark in St Vital, Winnipeg MB. He also used to rap/freestyle in his early teenage years.

Ross has a daughter who was born in 2015 while he was a member of the Okanagan Sun, but was able to fly back to Winnipeg in time for her birth. He and his daughter's mother, Kelsey Elizabeth, were teenage sweethearts and now coparent after they broke up. His brother, Alex Taylor, was selected by the Eskimos in the 2018 CFL draft and the two were teammates in 2019. Ross gained notoriety in 2021 through a viral video which showed him dunking an Oreo while performing a backflip. In 2022, Ross filmed another video that went viral of him doing a backflip while holding a barbell.
