= Jordan Beaulieu =

Canadian gridiron football player (born 1993)

Profile
- Position: Defensive back

Personal information
- Born: September 27, 1993 (age 33); Montreal, Quebec, Canada
- Listed height: 5 ft 11 in (1.80 m)
- Listed weight: 200 lb (91 kg)

Career information
- University: Western
- CFL draft: 2018: 3rd round, 24th overall pick

Career history
- 2018–2021: Edmonton Eskimos / Elks
- 2021–2022: Ottawa Redblacks
- 2022: Saskatchewan Roughriders

Awards and highlights
- Vanier Cup champion (2017)
- Stats at CFL.ca

Jordan Beaulieu (born September 27, 1993) is a Canadian professional football defensive back. He played U Sports football at Western University. Beaulieu has been a member of the Edmonton Elks, Ottawa Redblacks, and Saskatchewan Roughriders

== University career ==
Beaulieu played U Sports football for the Western Mustangs from 2014 to 2017. He played in 24 regular season games where he had 48 tackles, two sacks, five pass knockdowns, two interceptions, two forced fumbles, and two fumble recoveries. He finished his career with a Vanier Cup championship after the Mustangs defeated the Laval Rouge et Or in the 53rd Vanier Cup game.

== Professional career ==
Pre-draft measurables
Height	Weight	20-yard shuttle	Three-cone drill	Vertical jump	Broad jump	Bench press
5 ft 11 1/8 in (1.81 m)	200 lb (91 kg)	4.13 s	7.06 s	35.5 in (0.90 m)	9 ft 9 1/4 in (2.98 m)	14 reps
All values from CFL Combine

=== Edmonton Eskimos / Elks ===
Beaulieu was drafted by the Edmonton Eskimos in the third round, 24th overall, in the 2018 CFL draft and signed with the team on May 16, 2018. He made the team's active roster following training camp and played in his first career professional game on June 14, 2018 against the Winnipeg Blue Bombers where he recorded two special teams tackles. He played in 12 regular season games in 2018 where he had one defensive tackle and five special teams tackles.

In 2019, he played in all 18 regular season games where he again had one defensive tackle and five special teams tackles. He also made his first career start, at safety, in the final game of the regular season against the Saskatchewan Roughriders on November 2, 2019. He played in his first two career playoff games, but the Eskimos lost the East Final to the Hamilton Tiger-Cats.

Beaulieu did not play in 2020 due to the cancellation of the 2020 CFL season. He spent training camp with the newly named Edmonton Elks in 2021, but was released with the final cuts on July 29, 2021.

=== Ottawa Redblacks ===
On August 11, 2021, Beaulieu signed with the Ottawa Redblacks. He played in five games for the Redblacks during the 2021 season. The following season Beaulieu was released as part of the team's final roster cuts on June 4, 2022.

=== Saskatchewan Roughriders ===
On July 5, 2022, it was announced that Beaulieu had signed with the Saskatchewan Roughriders. On May 17, 2023, Beaulieu was released by the Roughriders.
