= Jordan Hoover =

Canadian gridiron football player (born 1993)

Profile
- Position: Defensive back

Personal information
- Born: March 22, 1993 (age 33); Sault Ste. Marie, Ontario, Canada
- Listed height: 6 ft 1 in (1.85 m)
- Listed weight: 190 lb (86 kg)

Career information
- High school: St. Basil Secondary
- University: Waterloo
- CFL draft: 2017: 4th round, 31st overall pick

Career history
- 2017–2021: Edmonton Eskimos / Elks
- 2022: BC Lions*
- 2022: Hamilton Tiger-Cats*
- * Offseason or practice squad member only
- Stats at CFL.ca

Jordan Hoover (born March 22, 1993) is a Canadian former professional football defensive back who played in the Canadian Football League (CFL).

== University career ==
Hoover played U Sports football for the Waterloo Warriors from 2013 to 2016, leading the country in interceptions in 2015 with five.

== Professional career ==
Pre-draft measurables
Height	Weight	40-yard dash	20-yard shuttle	Three-cone drill	Vertical jump	Broad jump	Bench press
6 ft 0 5/8 in (1.84 m)	194 lb (88 kg)	4.60 s	4.09 s	6.98 s	35.5 in (0.90 m)	9 ft 10 in (3.00 m)	10 reps
All values from CFL Combine

=== Edmonton Eskimos / Elks ===
Hoover was drafted in the fourth round, 31st overall, of the 2017 CFL draft by the Edmonton Eskimos and signed with the team on May 25, 2017. He made the team following training camp and played in his first professional game on June 24, 2017, against the BC Lions where he had one special teams tackle. In his rookie year, he played in 17 regular season games and had one defensive tackle and eight special team tackles. He made his post-season debut in 2017 where he played in both playoff games and recorded one special team tackle.

To begin his sophomore season in 2018, Hoover earned his first professional start in the team's opening game on June 14, 2018, against the Winnipeg Blue Bombers, where he had two defensive tackles. He played in all 18 regular season games, starting in three, where he had 11 defensive tackles and nine special teams tackles. In 2019, he became a regular starter on defense, starting in 15 out of 18 games played and had a career-high 53 defensive tackles, one quarterback sack, two interceptions, and two fumble recoveries. He played in both playoff games in 2019 where he had ten total defensive tackles, including a team-leading seven tackles in the East Semi-Final victory over the Montreal Alouettes.

Hoover did not play in 2020 due to the cancellation of the 2020 CFL season and signed a one-year contract extension with Edmonton on February 4, 2021. With the newly-named Edmonton Elks in 2021, he played in 13 regular season games and had 46 defensive tackles, five special teams tackles, and one interception. On the day before 2022 training camp, Hoover was released on May 14, 2022.

=== BC Lions ===
On May 21, 2022, it was announced that Hoover had signed with the BC Lions. However, he was released the next day on May 22, 2022.

=== Hamilton Tiger-Cats ===
After sitting out most of the 2022 season, Hoover was signed to the practice roster of the Hamilton Tiger-Cats on October 11, 2022. He was released on October 27, 2022.
