= Brock Sunderland =

Hamilton Tiger-Cats
- Title: Senior Director of Player Personnel

Personal information
- Born: November 11, 1979 (age 46); Great Falls, Montana, U.S.

Career information
- College: Montana

Career history
- 2004–2005: Montreal Alouettes (Regional Scout/Advance Scout)
- 2005–2007: Montreal Alouettes (Director of Scouting)
- 2007–2012: New York Jets (Pro Scout)
- 2013–2016: Ottawa Redblacks (Assistant General Manager)
- 2017–2021: Edmonton Eskimos / Elks (General Manager)
- 2025: Winnipeg Blue Bombers (Senior Director of Player Personnel)
- 2026–present: Hamilton Tiger-Cats (Senior Director of Player Personnel)

Brock Sunderland (born November 11, 1979) is the senior director of player personnel for the Hamilton Tiger-Cats of the Canadian Football League (CFL). He attended the University of Montana, where he was a kick returner and receiver on the Montana Grizzlies football team.

== Management career ==
Sunderland started his professional football management career as a regional scout for the Montreal Alouettes in 2004, working his way up to Director of Scouting under Jim Popp. He then served as a college and pro scout with the New York Jets from 2007 to 2012. He was then hired by the Ottawa Redblacks in 2013 and was the assistant general manager when the team won the Grey Cup in 2016.

Sunderland was hired as the general manager of the Edmonton Eskimos (Now the Edmonton Elks) in 2017 and served in that capacity until 2021. On January 10, 2025, it was announced that he had joined the Winnipeg Blue Bombers as a senior director of player personnel. After one year with the Blue Bombers, it was announced on December 17, 2025, that Sunderland had joined the Hamilton Tiger-Cats as their senior director of player personnel.

== CFL GM record ==
Team	Year	Regular season					Postseason		
Team	Year	Won	Lost	Ties	Win %	Finish	Won	Lost	Result
EDM	2017	12	6	0	.667	3rd in West Division	1	1	Lost in West Final
EDM	2018	9	9	0	.500	5th in West Division	-	-	Did not qualify
EDM	2019	8	10	0	.444	4th in West Division	1	1	Lost in East Final
EDM	2021	3	11	0	.214	5th in West Division	-	-	Did not qualify
Total		32	36	0	.471	0 West Division; Championships	2	2	0 Grey Cups
