= Tanner Green =

Canadian gridiron football player (born 1993)

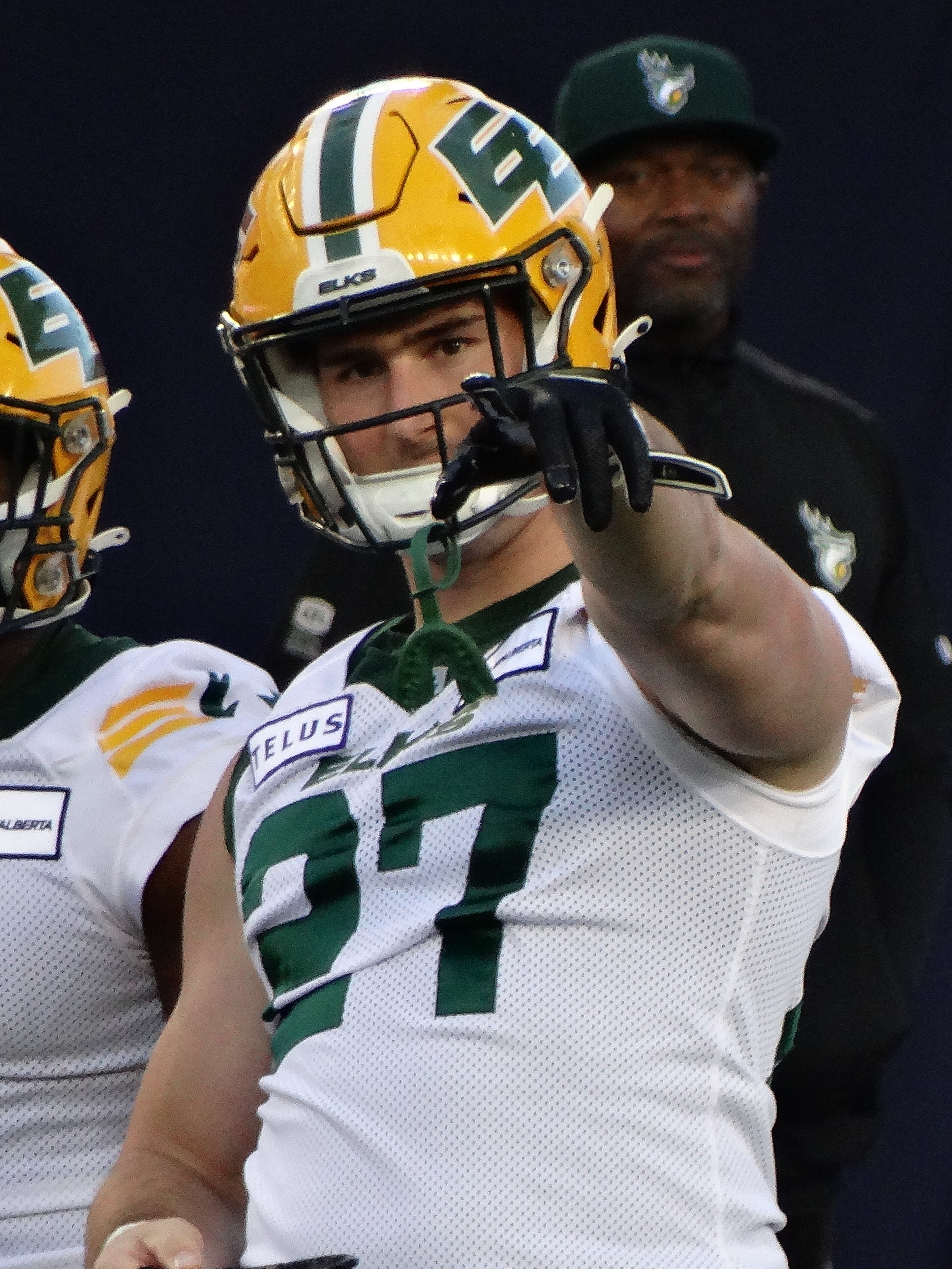
- Green with the Edmonton Elks in 2023

No. 27
- Position: Fullback

Personal information
- Born: March 3, 1993 (age 33); Lacombe, Alberta, Canada
- Listed height: 6 ft 3 in (1.91 m)
- Listed weight: 235 lb (107 kg)

Career information
- High school: Lacombe Composite
- University: Concordia
- CFL draft: 2018: 4th round, 32nd overall pick

Career history
- 2018–2025: Edmonton Eskimos/Elks
- Stats at CFL.ca

Tanner Green (born March 3, 1993) is a Canadian former professional football fullback who played for the Edmonton Elks of the Canadian Football League (CFL).

== University career ==
Following high school, Green did not play football and had work as an industrial painter. After four years away from the game, he joined a recreational team where teammates suggested that he play football in university. Green sent tape to several universities and opted to join the Concordia Stingers of U Sports football, where he played from 2016 to 2017. He played in 12 games where he recorded six carries for 11 yards and one touchdown in addition to one reception for five yards.

== Professional career ==
Pre-draft measurables
Height	Weight	40-yard dash	20-yard shuttle	Three-cone drill	Broad jump
6 ft 2 in (1.88 m)	241 lb (109 kg)	4.89 s	4.46 s	7.34 s	9 ft 5 in (2.87 m)
All values from CFL Combine

Green was drafted in the fourth round, 32nd overall, by the Edmonton Elks in the 2018 CFL draft and signed with the team on May 16, 2018. He made his professional debut on July 13, 2018, in the team's win against the Toronto Argonauts. He played in eight regular season games, while also spending time on the practice roster, where he recorded seven special teams tackles. In 2019, he received more playing time on offense, recording three receptions for 33 yards, while also tallying 12 special teams tackles and one forced fumble in 12 games played. He also made his post-season debut as he played in both post-season games and recorded three special teams tackles. He did not play in 2020 due to the cancellation of the 2020 CFL season, but signed a three-year contract extension on December 31, 2020.

During the 2021 season, Green scored his first career touchdown on November 13, 2021, against the Saskatchewan Roughriders, on a five-yard pass from Taylor Cornelius. He played in 12 regular season games that year where he had two receptions for 11 yards and a touchdown and a career-high 15 special teams tackles. In 2022, Green played in 15 regular season games and recorded four catches for 49 yards and one touchdown and 12 special teams tackles. In 2023, he played in 12 games and had 14 special teams tackles, but finished the year without a reception for the first time since his rookie season. On December 1, 2023, it was announced that Green had signed a two-year contract extension with the Elks. He retired on February 2, 2026.
