= Mercy Maston =

American gridiron football player (born 1992)

Profile
- Position: Defensive back

Personal information
- Born: November 10, 1992 (age 33); Bakersfield, California, U.S.
- Listed height: 5 ft 11 in (1.80 m)
- Listed weight: 208 lb (94 kg)

Career information
- High school: Bakersfield High School
- College: Boise State

Career history
- 2017–2018: Edmonton Eskimos
- 2019: Philadelphia Eagles*
- 2019–2022: Winnipeg Blue Bombers
- * Offseason or practice squad member only

Awards and highlights
- 2× Grey Cup champion (2019, 2021)
- Stats at Pro Football Reference
- Stats at CFL.ca

Mercy Maston (born November 10, 1992) is an American former professional football defensive back.

== Playing career ==
Maston started his CFL career with the Edmonton Eskimos but was limited in playing time due to an Achilles injury. Following two years with the Eskimos, Mercy was released in January 2019 and signed a futures contract with the Philadelphia Eagles, but was cut before playing an NFL game. Following injuries to Brandon Alexander and Marcus Rios, the Blue Bombers needed help in the secondary and signed Maston in August 2019. Maston helped the Blue Bombers win the 107th Grey Cup, defeating the Hamilton Tiger-Cats 33–12. Following the win, he signed an extension with Winnipeg through to the end of the 2020 season. However, the 2019 season would be the last time Maston would play in a regular season game during his career due to repeated injuries.

After the CFL canceled the 2020 season due to the COVID-19 pandemic, he chose to opt-out of his contract with the Blue Bombers on August 31, 2020. He signed a one-year contract with the Blue Bombers on January 7, 2021.

Maston suffered a season ending torn Achilles tendon in training camp and did not play with the team through the 2021 CFL season. Following the season he signed an extension with the Bombers for the 2022 season, but would once again get injured in camp and miss the full regular season.

On February 14, 2023, Maston became a free agent.
