= Bryant Mitchell =

American gridiron football player (born 1992)

No. 16, 80, 81
- Position: Wide receiver

Personal information
- Born: August 16, 1992 (age 34); San Diego, California, U.S.
- Listed height: 6 ft 2 in (1.88 m)
- Listed weight: 198 lb (90 kg)

Career information
- High school: Mount Miguel (Spring Valley, California)
- College: Northwestern State
- NFL draft: 2015: undrafted

Career history
- Edmonton Eskimos (2015–2018); Arizona Cardinals (2019)*; Tampa Bay Buccaneers (2019); Winnipeg Blue Bombers (2021)*
- * Offseason or practice squad member only

Career CFL statistics
- Receptions: 97
- Receiving yards: 1,418
- Receiving touchdowns: 6
- Stats at CFL.ca
- Stats at Pro Football Reference

Bryant Mitchell (born August 16, 1992) is a former professional gridiron football wide receiver. He played four years in the Canadian Football League (CFL), and two years in the National Football League (NFL). He played college football at Northwestern State.

== Professional career ==
Pre-draft measurables
Height	Weight	Arm length	Hand span	10-yard split	20-yard split	20-yard shuttle	Three-cone drill	Vertical jump	Broad jump	Bench press
6 ft 1 3/8 in (1.86 m)	185 lb (84 kg)	32 3/8 in (0.82 m)	9 1/2 in (0.24 m)	1.67 s	2.71 s	4.19 s	7.08 s	39.0 in (0.99 m)	10 ft 9 in (3.28 m)	4 reps
All values from Pro Day

=== Edmonton Eskimos ===
Mitchell played three seasons with the Edmonton Eskimos, taking on a more involved role in the offense each season. In total, he played 19 games for the Eskimos catching 97 passes for 1,418 yards with six touchdowns.

=== Arizona Cardinals ===
On January 10, 2019, Mitchell signed a reserve/future contract with the Arizona Cardinals. He was waived on May 10, 2019.

=== Tampa Bay Buccaneers ===
On May 16, 2019, Mitchell was signed by the Tampa Bay Buccaneers. He was placed on injured reserve on August 11, 2019, with a torn Achilles.

On March 19, 2020, Mitchell and the Buccaneers agreed to a new one-year contract. He was waived on September 5, 2020.

=== Winnipeg Blue Bombers ===
On February 10, 2021, it was announced that Mitchell had signed with the Winnipeg Blue Bombers. However, he announced his retirement in the following month on March 25, 2021.
