= Josh Woodman =

Canadian gridiron football player (born 1992)

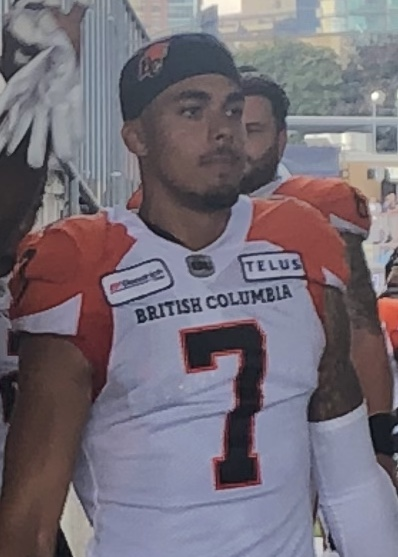
- Woodman with the BC Lions in 2019

Profile
- Position: Defensive back

Personal information
- Born: March 21, 1992 (age 34); Chatham, Ontario, Canada
- Listed height: 6 ft 1 in (1.85 m)
- Listed weight: 195 lb (88 kg)

Career information
- University: Western Ontario
- CFL draft: 2016: 5th round, 44th overall pick

Career history
- 2016–2018: Edmonton Eskimos
- 2019: BC Lions
- 2021: Edmonton Elks
- Stats at CFL.ca

Josh Woodman (born March 21, 1992) is a Canadian former professional football defensive back who played in the Canadian Football League (CFL). He was drafted by the Edmonton Eskimos 44th overall in the fifth round of the 2016 CFL draft. He played CIS football for the Western Mustangs. He also played for the BC Lions.
