= Neil King (Canadian football) =

Canadian football player (born 1988)

Profile
- Position: Defensive back

Personal information
- Born: September 10, 1988 (age 38); Edmonton, Alberta, Canada
- Listed height: 6 ft 0 in (1.83 m)
- Listed weight: 195 lb (88 kg)

Career information
- University: Saint Mary's
- CFL draft: 2013: 5th round, 43rd overall pick

Career history
- 2013–2015: Hamilton Tiger-Cats
- 2016–2018: Edmonton Eskimos
- Stats at CFL.ca

Neil King (born September 10, 1988) is a Canadian former professional football defensive back who played in the Canadian Football League (CFL) for the Edmonton Eskimos and Hamilton Tiger-Cats. He played three seasons for the Eskimos before he was released by the team on January 15, 2019. He also played three seasons for the Tiger-Cats. He was selected by the Tiger-Cats 43rd overall in the fifth round of the 2013 CFL draft and signed with the team on May 27, 2013. He played CIS Football for the Saint Mary's Huskies.
