= Arjen Colquhoun =

Canadian gridiron football player (born 1992)

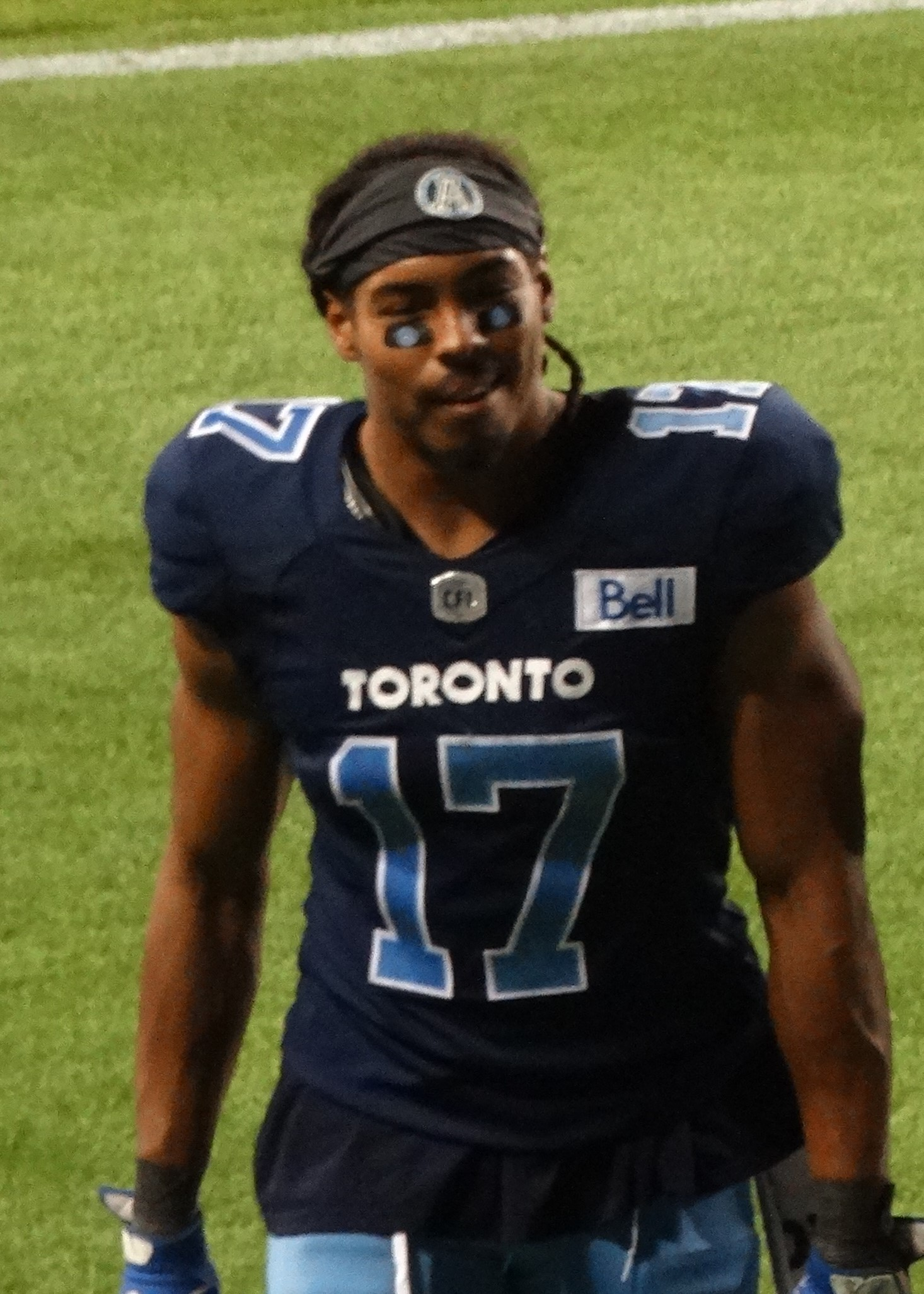
- Colquhoun with the Toronto Argonauts in 2021

Profile
- Position: Defensive back

Personal information
- Born: October 13, 1992 (age 34); Windsor, Ontario, Canada
- Listed height: 6 ft 0 in (1.83 m)
- Listed weight: 190 lb (86 kg)

Career information
- High school: W. F. Herman Secondary
- College: Michigan State
- CFL draft: 2016: 2nd round, 17th overall pick

Career history
- 2016: Dallas Cowboys*
- 2017–2019: Edmonton Eskimos
- 2020–2021: Toronto Argonauts
- * Offseason or practice squad member only
- Stats at CFL.ca

Arjen Colquhoun (born October 13, 1992) is a Canadian former professional football defensive back who played in four seasons in the Canadian Football League (CFL). He was drafted by the Edmonton Eskimos, with their second pick, 17th overall, in the second round of the 2016 CFL draft. He signed with the National Football League's Dallas Cowboys on May 1, 2016, after going undrafted in 2016 NFL draft, but was part of the team's training camp cuts in August following an injury. He also played for the Toronto Argonauts for one year. He played college football for the Michigan State Spartans from 2011 to 2015.

== Early life ==
Colquhoun was born on October 13, 1992, in Windsor, Ontario, to Anthony Colquhoun (Father) and Dolly Garbutt Colquhoun (Mother). Arjen is the oldest of four children, with two younger brothers and one sister.

Ranked among the nation's top safeties by Rivals.com (No. 42), Scout.com (No. 61) and Scouts, Inc. (No. 62). Arjen was a three-year starter for Coach Harry Lumley at W.F. Herman Secondary School in Windsor, Ontario; the same secondary school that produced St. Louis Rams free safety Oshiomogho Atogwe. Arjen was selected 2010 Defensive MVP of the Windsor & Essex County Secondary Schools Athletic Association's all-city team. He was also named to the Newman Conference all-star team.

Colquhoun accounted for 2,000 all-purpose yards and 16 touchdowns in 2010, rushed 14 times for 83 yards and contributed three pass break-ups in the Green Griffins' 48-23 victory over Brantford Assumption in the 2010 Ontario Federation of School Athletic Association's Western Bowl. His 55-yard gallop set up his own 3-yard TD run vs. London Catholic Central in the OFSAA West Regional championship and scored on runs of 95 and 2 yards vs. Sarnia in the Southwestern Ontario Secondary School Athletic Association's title game.

Arjen accounted for three scores vs. Villanova, including a 45-yard TD reception. He was a two-time all-city selection as a running back in 2008-09.

As a multi-faceted athlete, Arjen was presented the Royal Arcanum as Essex County's best high school male athlete for 2009-10. He played on the 2008-09 basketball team that won the WECSSAA and SWOSSAA championships. At the same time, played baseball as an outfielder/pitcher and hit .263 for the Windsor Selects 18U in the Premier Baseball League of Ontario.

He won three silver medals in the OFSAA track championships (2007 - 400; 2008 - 300 hurdles; and 2009 - 4x100).

== College career ==
Colquhoun was initially recruited by Pat Narduzzi. He was later accepted to Michigan State University (MSU) in 2011, majoring in political science/pre-law. After a football camp in 2011 in Cleveland, OH, Arjen hit radars of NCAA recruits, earning the nickname "The Canadian Flash". As a redshirt freshman, he appeared in 5 games, focusing mostly on special teams.

As a sophomore, he appeared in 10 games as a backup cornerback and made 5 tackles. He was a part of a 13-1 Michigan State Football team that was 7–0 at home and ended the season on a 10-game win streak. That year they won the 2013 B1G Ten Champion, as the team beat Ohio State University, 34–32. They also went on to win the 2013 Rose Bowl Championship beating Stanford University 24-20.

As a junior, he appeared in 11 games as a backup cornerback, collecting 12 tackles and 2 pass breakups. The team had a successful record of 11–2 and finished their season as 2014 Cotton Bowl Classic Champion, defeating Baylor University 42-41.

As a senior, he appeared in 14 games with 11 starts, registering 45 tackles, 2 interceptions, 10 pass breakups (led the team) and 2 forced fumbles (tied for the team lead). He also received the 2015 President's Award (Senior Lineman/Senior Back Perseverance). He tied for seventh in the Big Ten Conference in pass break-ups (10) and passes defended (0.9 per game). Arjen earned an eight ranked spot on the team with 72 production points.

He finished his college career with 62 tackles, 3 interceptions, and 12 pass break-ups in 40 career games.

=== Career statistics ===
==== Career participation statistics ====
Defensive Statistics
	GP	SOLO	AST	TOT	TFL-YDS	SACKS-YDS	INT	PD	FF	FR	BLK
2011 (Freshman)	0	0	0	0	0	0	0	0	0	0	0
2012 (Redshirt Freshman)	5	0	0	0	0 - 0	0 - 0	0	0	0	0	0
2013 (Sophomore)	10	1	4	5	0 - 0	0 - 0	0	0	0	0	0
2014 (Junior)	11	7	4	12	0 - 0	0 - 0	1	3	0	0	0
2015 (Senior)	14	31	14	45	1.5 - 12	1 - 11	2	12	2	1	0
TOTAL	39	38	22	62	1.5 - 12	1.0 - 11	3	15	2	1	0

== Professional career ==
=== Dallas Cowboys ===
Colquhoun was signed as an undrafted free agent by the Dallas Cowboys after the 2016 NFL draft on April 30. He was waived injured on August 30.

=== Edmonton Eskimos ===
Colquhoun was drafted by the Edmonton Eskimos with their second pick, 17th overall, in the second round of the 2016 CFL draft. In this draft the Eskimos had the fewest picks with a total of six. Colquhoun was ranked fourth that year as per the CFL's Scouting Bureau's Final Ranking.

After spending 2016 pursuing NFL opportunities, he signed with the Eskimos on May 28, 2017. He played in 24 regular season games over three seasons for the team, recording 48 defensive tackles, four special teams tackles, and two interceptions. After finishing his three-year contract, he became a free agent on February 11, 2020.

=== Toronto Argonauts ===
On February 14, 2020, it was announced that Colquhoun had signed with the Toronto Argonauts. He re-signed with the team on January 7, 2021. He played in seven regular season games where he had four defensive tackles and one special teams tackle. He was moved to the retired list on May 20, 2022.

== Awards and honours ==
=== High school ===
==== Basketball ====
- WECSSAA Championship (2008–09)
- SWOSSAA Championship (2008–09)

==== Track and field ====
- Gold Medal, 400m, SWOSSAA Track Championships (2010) - 49.71
- Gold Medal, 400m, OFSAA West Regionals (2010) - 49.32
- Gold Medal, 4 x 400m, OFSAA West Regionals (2010) - 3:19.22 -Teammates; Brandon McBride, Miloš Savić, and Charles Johnson.
- Bronze Medal, 100m, SWOSSAA Championships (2010) - 11.28

==== Other ====
- Royal Arcanum Award, Essex County's Best High School Male Athlete (2009–10)

=== College ===
Football

- 2013 B1G Ten Champion (MSU)
- 2013 Rose Bowl Championship (MSU)
- 2014 Cotton Bowl Classic Champion (MSU)
- 2015 President's Award - Defense (MSU: Senior Lineman/Senior Back Perseverance)
