= Blair Smith =

Canadian football player (born 1990)

Profile
- Position: Linebacker

Personal information
- Born: September 25, 1990 (age 36); Mississauga, Ontario, Canada
- Listed height: 6 ft 2 in (1.88 m)
- Listed weight: 230 lb (104 kg)

Career information
- High school: St. Marcellinius
- College: Angelo State; New Mexico Military Institute; St. Francis Xavier
- CFL draft: 2015: 7th round, 60th overall pick

Career history
- 2015–2020: Edmonton Eskimos
- 2021: Saskatchewan Roughriders*
- * Offseason or practice squad member only

Awards and highlights
- Grey Cup champion (2015)
- Stats at CFL.ca

Blair Smith (born September 25, 1990) is a Canadian professional football linebacker. He attended Angelo State University where he played college football for the Angelo State Rams. He played for the Edmonton Eskimos from 2015 to 2020.

== Early career ==
Smith played high school football for St. Marcellinius Secondary School, and went on to play at Vanier College. In 2011, he transferred to St. Francis Xavier University and played for the St. Francis Xavier X-Men as a defensive back. He later transferred to New Mexico Military Institute to play for the Broncos, where he completed 48 total tackles, one sack, and one interception in a season. From 2013 to 2014, he played for the Angelo State Rams. He finished his last season at Angelo State with 101 tackles and 2.5 sacks and 2 interceptions.

== Professional career ==
=== Edmonton Eskimos ===
Smith was selected in the seventh round of the 2015 CFL draft by the Edmonton Eskimos with the 60th overall pick. He remained on the active roster following the preseason, and made his CFL debut in the season opener against the Toronto Argonauts on June 27, 2015. He played in every game of his rookie season and contributed 20 special teams tackles. He continued to be a major part of the Eskimos special team unit in 2016, while also seeing more snaps on defense. He was re-signed by the Eskimos on February 10, 2017; preventing him from becoming a free agent. He played with the Eskimos through to the 2019 season, but saw a reduced role where he had just five special teams tackles in seven games in 2019. He did not play in 2020 as the 2020 CFL season was cancelled and was released on January 9, 2021.

=== Saskatchewan Roughriders ===
On January 12, 2021, it was announced that Smith had signed with the Saskatchewan Roughriders to a one-year contract. He was released on June 21, 2021.
