= Kwabena Asare =

Canadian football player (born 1992)

Profile
- Position: Offensive lineman

Personal information
- Born: February 25, 1992 (age 34); Ghana
- Listed height: 6 ft 6 in (1.98 m)
- Listed weight: 319 lb (145 kg)

Career information
- College: Carleton
- CFL draft: 2017: 6th round, 49th overall pick

Career history
- 2017–2020: Edmonton Eskimos
- 2021: Calgary Stampeders*
- 2021: Montreal Alouettes*
- * Offseason or practice squad member only
- Stats at CFL.ca

Kwabena Asare (born February 25, 1992) is a former professional Canadian football offensive lineman who played in the Canadian Football League (CFL). He played U Sports football at Carleton.

== University career ==
Asare played U Sports football for five seasons for the Carleton Ravens from 2012 to 2016 while pursuing a degree in Communication and Media Studies. He was selected to play in the 2016 East-West Bowl as a member of the East Team.

== Professional career ==
Pre-draft measurables
| Height | Weight | 40-yard dash | 20-yard shuttle | Three-cone drill | Vertical jump | Broad jump | Bench press |
|---|---|---|---|---|---|---|---|
| 6 ft 6 1/4 in (1.99 m) | 319 lb (145 kg) | 5.60 s | 5.13 s | 8.90 s | 24.0 in (0.61 m) | 8 ft 1 1/2 in (2.48 m) | 15 reps |
All values from CFL Combine

=== Edmonton Eskimos ===
After being selected in the sixth round of the 2017 CFL draft by the Edmonton Eskimos, Asare spent two seasons on the team's practice squad. He was promoted to the active roster in 2019, appearing in five games that season. After the season, Asare entered free agency for the first time in his career. He signed with the Eskimos on February 3, 2020. However, he did not play in 2020 due to the cancellation of the 2020 CFL season. Asare was then released on July 19, 2021, prior to the 2021 season.

=== Calgary Stampeders ===
Soon after his release from Edmonton, Asare signed with the Calgary Stampeders on July 22, 2021. However, he was released one week later on July 29, 2021.

=== Montreal Alouettes ===
On October 25, 2021, it was announced that Asare had signed with the Montreal Alouettes. He remained on the practice roster for the rest of 2021 and became a free agent at the end of the season. He re-signed with the Alouettes on March 8, 2022. He spent part of 2022 training camp with the team, but was released after the first pre-season game on May 29, 2022.

== Personal life ==
Asare was born in Ghana and raised in Brampton.
