= Shaq Cooper =

American football player (born 1993)

No. 25, 2, 38, 29
- Position: Running back

Personal information
- Born: March 24, 1993 (age 33)
- Listed height: 5 ft 9 in (1.75 m)
- Listed weight: 190 lb (86 kg)

Career information
- High school: Coral Gables (Coral Gables, Florida)
- College: Fort Hays State (2011–2012, 2015–2016)
- NFL draft: 2017: undrafted

Career history
- Edmonton Eskimos (2018–2019); BC Lions (2021); Winnipeg Blue Bombers (2021); Saskatchewan Roughriders (2022)

Awards and highlights
- Grey Cup champion (2021); 2× First-team All-MIAA (2015–2016)
- Stats at CFL.ca

Shaquille Cooper (born March 24, 1993) is an American former professional football running back who played four seasons in the Canadian Football League (CFL) with the Edmonton Eskimos, BC Lions, Winnipeg Blue Bombers, and Saskatchewan Roughriders. He played college football at Fort Hays State.

== Early life ==
Shaquille Cooper was born on March 24, 1993. He played high school football at Coral Gables Senior High School in Coral Gables, Florida. He rushed 33 times for 367 yards and four touchdowns his senior season before missing the rest of the year due to injury.

== College career ==
Cooper played college football for the Fort Hays State Tigers of Fort Hays State University. He redshirted the 2011 season. He played the first seven games of the 2012 season at defensive back, posting ten tackles and one fumble recovery. Cooper played the final four games of 2012 at running back, starting twice while rushing 47 times for 356 yards and four touchdowns. He led the team in all-purpose yards with 723.

Cooper did not attend college from 2013 to 2014. He returned to Fort Hays State in 2015. He appeared in all 12 games, starting 11, during the 2015 season, recording 245 carries for 1,441 yards and nine touchdowns and 37 receptions for 309 yards and five touchdowns. Cooper earned first-team All-MIAA and Don Hansen honorable mention All-American honors. As a senior in 2016, he rushed 164 times for 971 yards and six touchdowns while also catching 34 passes for 420 yards and five touchdowns, garnering first-team All-MIAA recognition for the second consecutive season.

== Professional career ==
Cooper went undrafted in the 2017 NFL draft. He had a workout with the New York Jets on August 4, 2017.

Cooper signed with the Edmonton Eskimos of the Canadian Football League (CFL) on March 19, 2018. He was moved between the practice roster and active roster several times during the 2018 season. Overall, he played in two games (both starts), totaling 25 carries for 144 yards and six receptions for 44 yards and one touchdown on seven targets. Cooper signed a futures contract with Edmonton on November 5, 2018. He spent the majority of the 2019 season on the practice roster as well. He dressed in five games, starting four, in 2019, rushing 65 times for 352 yards and two touchdowns while also catching 15 passes for 112 yards on 18 targets. Cooper re-signed with the Eskimos on January 7, 2020. However, the 2020 CFL season was cancelled due to the COVID-19 pandemic and Cooper became a free agent afterwards.

Cooper was signed by the CFL's BC Lions on February 9, 2021. He had multiple stints on injured reserve during the 2021 season. He dressed in five games, starting three, overall for the Lions in 2021, recording 33 rushing attempts for 142 yards and one touchdown and 11 catches for 69 yards on 12 targets. Cooper was released by BC on October 14, 2021.

On October 20, 2021, Cooper signed with the Winnipeg Blue Bombers of the CFL. He was moved between the active roster and practice roster several times. He dressed in two games overall for Winnipeg in 2021, returning five kickoffs for 108 yards and eight punts for 19 yards while posting one special teams tackle. On December 12, 2021, the Blue Bombers won the 108th Grey Cup against the Hamilton Tiger-Cats by a score of 33–25. The next day, Cooper was released by the Blue Bombers.

Cooper signed with the CFL's Saskatchewan Roughriders on April 5, 2022. He was released on June 5 but later re-signed on July 27 after the team had a COVID-19 breakout. He made his Roughriders debut on July 29, playing on special teams and making one tackle on a kickoff. Cooper was released again on August 10. He was signed to Saskatchewan's practice roster on September 30. He was promoted to the active roster on October 6 after injuries to running backs Jamal Morrow, Frankie Hickson, and Kienan LaFrance. Cooper was demoted back to the practice roster on October 18, and promoted to the active roster again on October 28, 2022. He dressed in three games, starting one, overall for Saskatchewan in 2022, totaling five rushes for seven yards, three receptions for 21 yards on three targets, and one special teams tackle. Cooper became a free agent after the 2022 season.

== Personal life ==
Cooper is a cousin of former NFL running back Frank Gore.
