= Alexandre Dupuis =

Canadian football player (born 1990)

No. 30
- Position: Fullback

Personal information
- Born: March 23, 1990 (age 36); Montreal, Quebec, Canada
- Listed height: 6 ft 3 in (1.91 m)
- Listed weight: 243 lb (110 kg)

Career information
- University: Montreal
- CFL draft: 2014: 4th round, 36th overall pick

Career history
- 2014–2016: Toronto Argonauts
- 2017–2018: Edmonton Eskimos
- 2021: Edmonton Elks*
- 2021: Montreal Alouettes
- 2021: Saskatchewan Roughriders
- * Offseason or practice squad member only
- Stats at CFL.ca

Alexandre Dupuis (born March 23, 1990) is a Canadian former professional football fullback who played in the Canadian Football League (CFL) for the Toronto Argonauts, Edmonton Eskimos, and Saskatchewan Roughriders.

== University career ==
Dupuis played CIS football for the Montreal Carabins from 2010 to 2013.

== Professional career ==
=== Toronto Argonauts ===
Dupuis was drafted by the Toronto Argonauts with the 36th pick in the 2014 CFL draft. He played in 50 regular season games over three years for the Argonauts where he had 20 catches for 213 yards and nine special teams tackles. He became a free agent upon the expiry of his rookie contract on February 14, 2017.

=== Edmonton Eskimos ===
On February 15, 2017, Dupuis signed with the Edmonton Eskimos. He played in 25 games over two seasons with the team where he had four receptions for 42 yards and five special teams tackles. He was released on June 3, 2019, and did not play during the 2019 season. He was also unsigned in 2020 as the 2020 CFL season was cancelled. Dupuis was re-signed by Edmonton to a one-year contract on February 4, 2021, but was later released on June 28, 2021.

=== Montreal Alouettes ===
On June 30, 2021, it was announced that Dupuis had signed with the Montreal Alouettes. However, he did not play in a game for the Alouettes (was on the injured list for game 1) and was released on August 16, 2021.

=== Saskatchewan Roughriders ===
On August 18, 2021, it was announced that Dupuis had signed with the Saskatchewan Roughriders. In his tenth game with the Roughriders, he scored his first professional touchdown on a four-yard pass from Cody Fajardo on November 13, 2021, against his former team, the Edmonton Elks.
