= Kwaku Boateng (Canadian football) =

Canadian gridiron football player (born 1995)

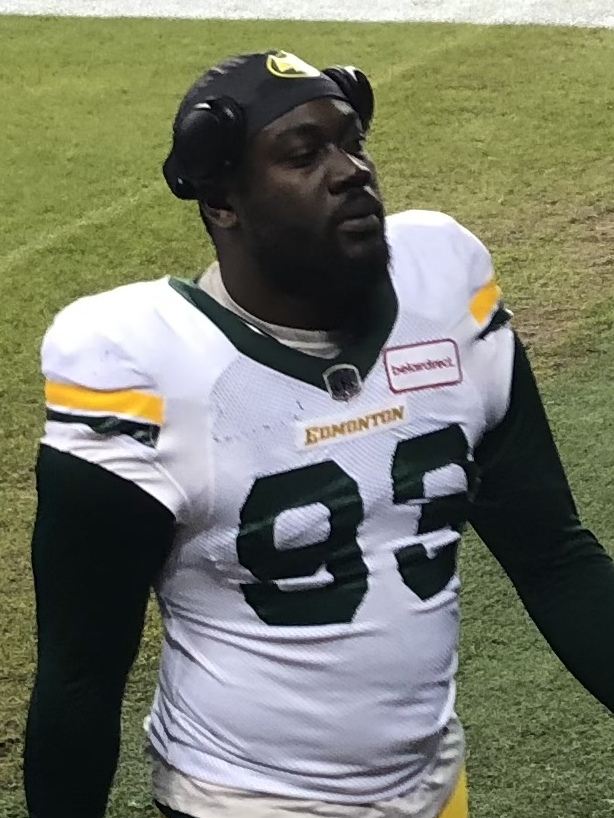
- Boateng with the Edmonton Elks in 2021

No. 93
- Position: Defensive end

Personal information
- Born: April 26, 1995 (age 31); Ghana
- Listed height: 6 ft 1 in (1.85 m)
- Listed weight: 250 lb (113 kg)

Career information
- High school: Bishop Reding Catholic Secondary School
- University: Wilfrid Laurier Golden Hawks
- CFL draft: 2017: 5th round, 41st overall pick

Career history
- 2017–2021: Edmonton Eskimos / Elks
- 2022: Ottawa Redblacks
- 2023: Hamilton Tiger-Cats
- Stats at CFL.ca

Kwaku Boateng (born April 26, 1995) is a Ghanaian-Canadian former professional football defensive end who played in the Canadian Football League (CFL). He played U Sports football for the Wilfrid Laurier Golden Hawks.

== Early life ==
Boateng was born in Ghana and grew up in Milton, Ontario.

== University career ==
He played four years for the Wilfrid Laurier Golden Hawks and is program's all-time sack leader. He was named a 2016 CIS Men's Football Second Team All-Canadian and is a two-time Academic All-Canadian.

== Professional career ==
Pre-draft measurables
Height	Weight	40-yard dash	20-yard shuttle	Three-cone drill	Vertical jump	Broad jump	Bench press
6 ft 0 1/2 in (1.84 m)	233 lb (106 kg)	4.90 s	4.29 s	7.49 s	33.5 in (0.85 m)	8 ft 7 3/4 in (2.64 m)	15 reps
All values from CFL Combine

=== Edmonton Eskimos / Elks ===
Boateng was selected in the fifth round (41st overall) in the 2017 CFL draft by the Edmonton Eskimos. He was signed by the Eskimos on May 23, 2017. He registered 21 defensive tackles, four sacks and one forced fumble in 18 regular season games during the 2017 season. In the 2017 CFL West Semi-Final, he recorded three tackles against the Winnipeg Blue Bombers. He also appeared in the West Final against the Calgary Stampeders. He was nominated as the team's Rookie of the Year candidate for the 2017 CFL Awards. Boateng continued his strong play in 2018 with 26 defensive tackles and nine quarterback sacks. On February 1, 2019, Boateng and the Eskimos agreed to a two-year contract extension.

In 2019, he was the Edmonton Eskimos' Most Outstanding Defensive Player. He re-signed with Edmonton on a contract extension through 2021 on December 26, 2020. He became a free agent upon the expiry of his contract on February 8, 2022.

=== Ottawa Redblacks ===
On February 8, 2022, Boateng signed a one-year contract with the Ottawa Redblacks. However, he suffered an injury and did not play in any games for the team. In the following offseason, he became a free agent on February 14, 2023.

=== Hamilton Tiger-Cats ===
On February 15, 2023, it was announced that Boateng had signed with the Hamilton Tiger-Cats. He was released on June 13, 2023.

Despite interest from CFL teams, he announced his retirement on July 20, 2023.
