= Mike Moore (Canadian football) =

American gridiron football player (born 1993)

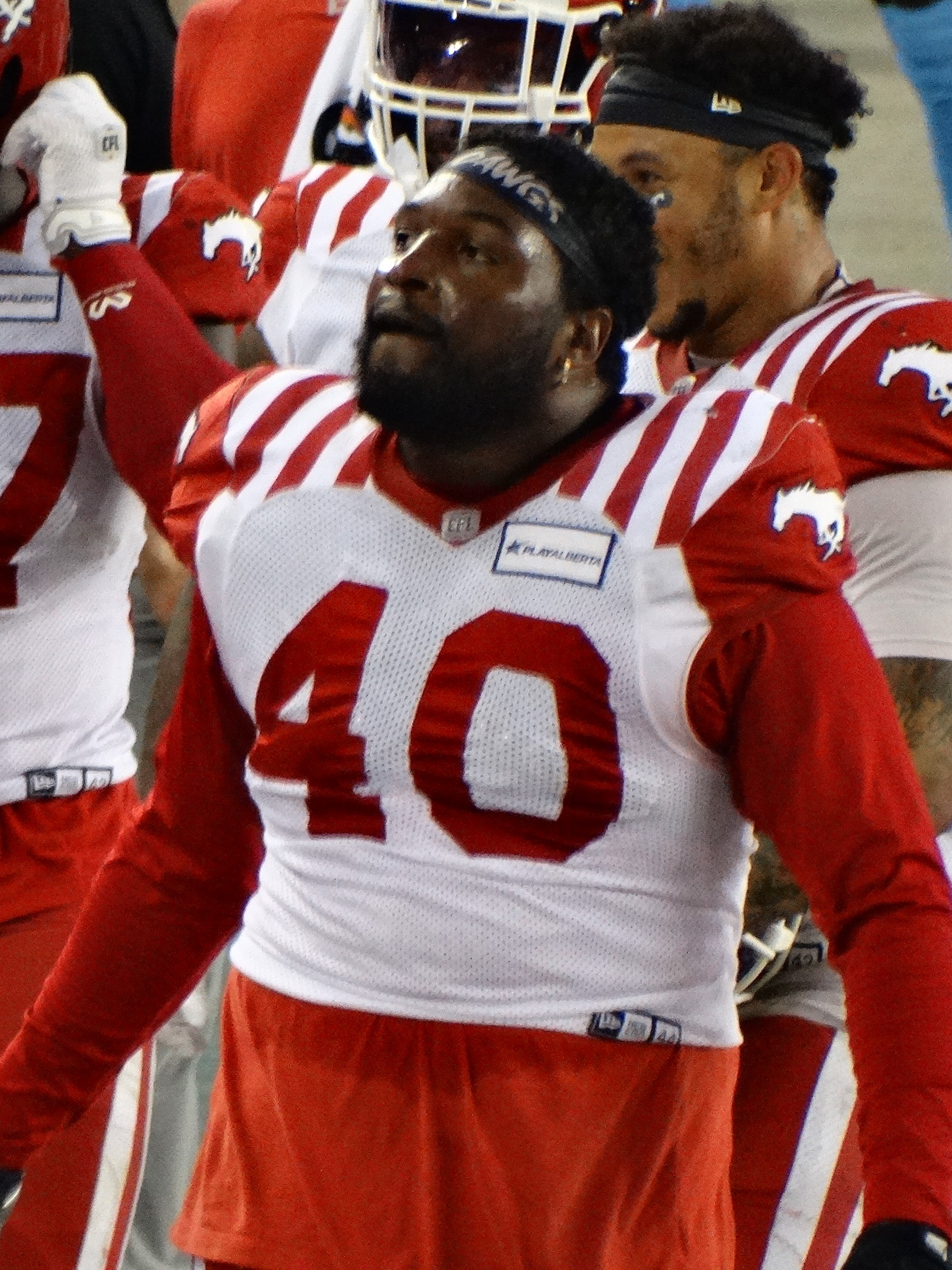
- Moore with the Calgary Stampeders in 2023

Profile
- Position: Defensive lineman

Personal information
- Born: September 25, 1993 (age 33); Laurel, Maryland, U.S.
- Listed height: 6 ft 4 in (1.93 m)
- Listed weight: 269 lb (122 kg)

Career information
- High school: DeMatha Catholic (Hyattsville, Maryland)
- College: Virginia (2012–2015)

Career history

Playing
- 2016: Ottawa Redblacks
- 2017–2021: Edmonton Eskimos / Elks
- 2022: Montreal Alouettes
- 2023: Calgary Stampeders

Coaching
- 2024: Virginia (Graduate assistant)
- 2025-present: Virginia (Defensive analyst)
- Stats at CFL.ca

Mike Moore (born September 25, 1993) is an American former professional football defensive end. He played in the Canadian Football League (CFL) for the Ottawa Redblacks, Edmonton Eskimos, Montreal Alouettes, and Calgary Stampeders. He played college football at Virginia.

== College career ==
Moore played college football with the Virginia Cavaliers from 2012 to 2015.

== Professional career ==
=== Ottawa Redblacks ===
Moore made his professional debut with the Ottawa Redblacks on June 25, 2016, against the Edmonton Eskimos where he had one defensive tackle. In 2016, he played in eight regular season games where he had 10 defensive tackles, two sacks, and one forced fumble. He did not play in any post-season games that year and was on the injured list when the Redblacks won the 104th Grey Cup. He was released by the Redblacks on March 9, 2017.

=== Edmonton Eskimos / Elks ===
On May 26, 2017, Moore was signed by the Edmonton Eskimos. He played in just 12 games over the next two seasons, but had a career year in 2019 when he played in 17 regular season games and recorded 23 defensive tackles and nine sacks. He did not play in 2020 due to the cancellation of the 2020 CFL season. Moore re-signed with Edmonton to a contract extension through 2022 on December 26, 2020. In a shortened 2021 season, he played in 11 games where he had 19 defensive tackles and two sacks.

=== Montreal Alouettes ===
On January 14, 2022, Moore was traded to the Montreal Alouettes in exchange for Tony Washington and Martese Jackson. He played in all 18 regular season games where he led the team with six sacks and had 31 defensive tackles and a forced fumble. He was released the day prior to free agency on February 13, 2023.

=== Calgary Stampeders ===
On April 1, 2023, it was announced that Moore has signed with the Calgary Stampeders. On May 10, 2023, Moore announced his retirement from professional football at age 29. However, on June 3, 2023, Moore unretired from football and rejoined the Stampeders. He became a free agent upon the expiry of his contract on February 13, 2024.
