= Tommie Draheim =

American gridiron football player (born 1988)

No. 57, 68, 64
- Position: Center

Personal information
- Born: December 23, 1988 (age 37); Kennewick, Washington, U.S.
- Listed height: 6 ft 4 in (1.93 m)
- Listed weight: 300 lb (136 kg)

Career information
- College: San Diego State
- NFL draft: 2012: undrafted

Career history
- Green Bay Packers (2012)*; Seattle Seahawks (2012)*; New England Patriots (2012)*; Jacksonville Jaguars (2012)*; Kansas City Chiefs (2013)*; Arizona Cardinals (2013–2014)*; BC Lions (2015); Ottawa RedBlacks (2016–2017); Edmonton Eskimos (2018–2020)
- * Offseason or practice squad member only

Awards and highlights
- Grey Cup champion (2016); First-team All-MWC (2011)
- Stats at Pro Football Reference
- Stats at CFL.ca

Tommie Draheim (born December 23, 1988) is an American former professional gridiron football offensive lineman. He played American football in the National Football League (NFL) and Canadian football in the Canadian Football League (CFL). He was signed by the Green Bay Packers as an undrafted free agent in 2012. He played college football at San Diego State.

== College career ==
Draheim played college football at San Diego State. He started 33 games, including 30-consecutive starts to end his career.

He earned first-team All-Mountain West Conference honors as a senior, becoming the first Aztec offensive lineman to be named first-team all-league since 2003.

A three-year letterman, he helped SDSU rank 10th in the country in 2011 for fewest sacks allowed (0.83 per game) and blocked for a running back who finished No. 3 in the country with 1,711 rushing yards on the season.

== Professional career ==
=== Green Bay Packers ===
After going undrafted in the 2012 NFL draft, Draheim signed with the Green Bay Packers on May 11, 2012. On August 31, 2012, he was released by the Packers.

=== Seattle Seahawks ===
Draheim was signed to the Seattle Seahawks on September 6, 2012, but was released on September 11.

=== New England Patriots ===
Draheim was signed to the New England Patriots practice squad on December 4, 2012, but was released on December 11.

=== Jacksonville Jaguars ===
Draheim was signed to the Jacksonville Jaguars practice squad on December 18, 2012.

=== Kansas City Chiefs ===
Draheim signed with the Kansas City Chiefs on April 3, 2013. He was released from the practice squad on September 10.

=== Arizona Cardinals ===
Draheim was signed to the Arizona Cardinals practice squad on November 7, 2013. The Cardinals released Draheim on August 25, 2014.

=== BC Lions ===
Draheim signed with the BC Lions on May 5, 2015. He was released by the team on May 5, 2016.

=== Ottawa RedBlacks ===
Draheim was signed by the Ottawa RedBlacks on May 6, 2016.

=== Edmonton Eskimos ===
Draheim signed a contract extension with the Edmonton Football Team on December 30, 2020. He retired from football on July 9, 2021.
