= Forrest Hightower =

American gridiron football player (born 1992)

No. 12
- Position: Defensive back

Personal information
- Born: March 15, 1992 (age 34); Oakland, California, U.S.
- Listed height: 5 ft 10 in (1.78 m)
- Listed weight: 185 lb (84 kg)

Career information
- High school: Concord (CA)
- College: San Jose State
- NFL draft: 2015: undrafted

Career history
- Ottawa Redblacks (2015–2016); New Orleans Saints (2017)*; Edmonton Eskimos (2017–2020)
- * Offseason or practice squad member only

Awards and highlights
- Grey Cup champion (2016)
- Stats at Pro Football Reference
- Stats at CFL.ca

Forrest Deon Hightower (born March 15, 1992) is a former gridiron football defensive back. He played college football at San Jose State.

== College career ==
Hightower played college football at San Jose State University from 2010 to 2014.

== Professional career ==
After two seasons with the Ottawa Redblacks of the Canadian Football League (CFL), Hightower signed a reserve/future contract with the Saints on January 4, 2017. He was waived by the Saints on May 22, 2017.

Hightower retired from football on June 30, 2021.
