= 2017 Montreal Alouettes season =

Canadian football team season

- General manager: Kavis Reed
- Head coach: Jacques Chapdelaine (3–8), Kavis Reed (0–7)
- Home stadium: Percival Molson Memorial Stadium

Results
- Record: 3–15
- Division place: 4th, East
- Playoffs: did not qualify
- Team MOP: Kyries Hebert
- Team MOC: Kristian Matte
- Team MOR: Branden Dozier

Uniform

The 2017 Montreal Alouettes season was the 51st season for the team in the Canadian Football League (CFL) and their 63rd overall. The Alouettes finished the season in fourth place in the East Division with a disappointing 3–15 record. The 15 losses are a team record, breaking the previous record of 14 set during the 1986 season when the team record was 4–14 and during the 1982 season when they finished 2–14.

The Alouettes failed to improve upon their 7–11 record from 2016 and were eliminated from the playoffs on October 9, 2017 after a loss to the Edmonton Eskimos, making this the third straight season they missed the playoffs (it was the first time the team missed the playoffs for three straight years since their re-activation). This was the first season for head coach Jacques Chapdelaine, until he was fired after a 3–8 start and replaced by general manager Kavis Reed on an interim basis. Chapdelaine served as head coach in an interim capacity for six games during the previous season. This was also the first season under new general manager Kavis Reed.

== Off-season ==
=== Front office changes ===
The 2017 season was the first since the Alouettes returned to Montreal in 1996 that Jim Popp was not be the team's general manager. It was announced on November 7, 2016 that Popp would not return to the Alouettes organization in 2017. In the week following the 104th Grey Cup, the Alouettes interviewed Danny Maciocia (head coach of the University of Montreal), Joey Abrams (Alouettes assistant general manager) and Brock Sunderland (Redblacks assistant general manager) for the vacant general manager position. By December 2016, Sunderland was no longer considered a candidate and Maciocia was not in negotiations with the team, having only taken part in one formal meeting. Not long after, Maciocia confirmed that he would remain at the University of Montreal. Two days later, Herb Zurkowsky from the Montreal Gazette reported that Kavis Reed (Alouettes Special Teams coach) was "the dark horse candidate" to win the GM position. By December 12, 2016, Reed had a formal interview with the Alouettes front office, making him the fourth official candidate for the position; prior to that, it had just been informal conversations. On December 14, 2016, the Montreal Alouettes held a press conference to announce Patrick Boivin as President and CEO, Kavis Reed as general manager, and Jacques Chapdelaine's retention as the team's head coach. Chapdelaine had served as the interim head coach for the final six games of the previous season. On December 20, 2016, the Alouettes announced that assistant GM Joey Abrams, who had been with the organization for the past dozen seasons, would be leaving the club.

On January 25, 2017 the Alouettes announced that Catherine Raiche and Joe Mack would become assistant general managers. Raiche was promoted from her previous position with the Alouettes as coordinator of football administration and held the title of assistant general manager of football operations. Mack, the former Winnipeg Blue Bombers general manager, was the assistant general manager of player personnel.

=== CFL draft ===
The 2017 CFL draft took place on May 7, 2017. The Alouettes traded their first round pick to the BC Lions for the rights to Vernon Adams. The team also acquired another sixth round pick after trading S. J. Green to the Toronto Argonauts.

Round	Pick	Player	Position	School	Hometown
2	12	Fabion Foote	DT	McMaster	North York, ON
3	20	Dondre Wright	DB	Henderson State	North York, ON
4	29	Alexander Morrison	WR	British Columbia	Sault Ste. Marie, ON
5	39	Zach Annen	OL	Carleton	St. Thomas, ON
6	45	Malcolm Carter	WR	Carleton	Toronto, ON
6	48	Denzel Radford	WR	Calgary	Calgary, AB
7	56	Ty Cranston	DB	Ottawa	Winnipeg, MB
8	65	Oumar Toure	TE	Sherbrooke	Montreal, QC

== Preseason ==
Week	Date	Kickoff	Opponent	Results		TV	Venue	Attendance	Summary
Week	Date	Kickoff	Opponent	Score	Record	TV	Venue	Attendance	Summary
A	Thurs, June 8	7:30 p.m. EDT	at Toronto Argonauts	L 20–24	0–1	None	BMO Field	5,532	Recap
B	Thurs, June 15	7:30 p.m. EDT	vs. Ottawa Redblacks	W 38–5	1–1	TSN2	Molson Stadium	12,533	Recap

# Games played with white uniforms.

== Regular season ==
=== Standings ===
East Division
Team	GP	W	L	T	Pts	PF	PA	Div	Stk	
Toronto Argonauts	18	9	9	0	18	482	456	6–2	W2	Details
Ottawa Redblacks	18	8	9	1	17	495	452	5–3	W3	Details
Hamilton Tiger-Cats	18	6	12	0	12	443	545	4–4	W1	Details
Montreal Alouettes	18	3	15	0	6	314	580	1–7	L11	Details

=== Schedule ===
Week	Date	Kickoff	Opponent	Results		TV	Venue	Attendance	Summary
Week	Date	Kickoff	Opponent	Score	Record	TV	Venue	Attendance	Summary
1	Thurs, June 22	7:30 p.m. EDT	vs. Saskatchewan Roughriders	W 17–16	1–0	TSN/RDS/ESPNews	Molson Stadium	20,129	Recap
2	Fri, June 30	10:00 p.m. EDT	at Edmonton Eskimos	L 19–23	1–1	TSN/RDS/ESPNews	Commonwealth Stadium	31,828	Recap
3	Thurs, July 6	7:30 p.m. EDT	vs. BC Lions	L 16–23	1–2	TSN/RDS	Molson Stadium	18,728	Recap
4	Fri, July 14	7:00 p.m. EDT	vs. Calgary Stampeders	W 30–23	2–2	TSN/RDS	Molson Stadium	18,610	Recap
5	Wed, July 19	7:30 p.m. EDT	at Ottawa Redblacks	L 19–24	2–3	TSN/RDS	TD Place Stadium	24,756	Recap
6	Thurs, July 27	8:30 p.m. EDT	at Winnipeg Blue Bombers	L 40–41	2–4	TSN/RDS/ESPN2	Investors Group Field	25,931	Recap
7	Bye								
8	Fri, Aug 11	7:30 p.m. EDT	vs. Toronto Argonauts	W 21–9	3–4	TSN/RDS	Molson Stadium	19,712	Recap
9	Sat, Aug 19	4:00 p.m. EDT	at Toronto Argonauts	L 6–38	3–5	TSN/RDS	BMO Field	16,326	Recap
10	Thurs, Aug 24	7:30 p.m. EDT	vs. Winnipeg Blue Bombers	L 31–34 (2OT)	3–6	TSN/RDS	Molson Stadium	18,564	Recap
11	Thurs, Aug 31	7:30 p.m. EDT	vs. Ottawa Redblacks	L 4–32	3–7	TSN/RDS	Molson Stadium	18,325	Recap
12	Fri, Sept 8	10:00 p.m. EDT	at BC Lions	L 18–41	3–8	TSN/RDS	BC Place	18,029	Recap
13	Sun, Sept 17	1:00 p.m. EDT	vs. Ottawa Redblacks	L 11–29	3–9	TSN/RDS/ESPN2	Molson Stadium	22,596	Recap
14	Sat, Sept 23	7:00 p.m. EDT	at Toronto Argonauts	L 19–33	3–10	TSN/RDS	BMO Field	12,862	Recap
15	Fri, Sept 29	9:30 p.m. EDT	at Calgary Stampeders	L 11–59	3–11	TSN/RDS	McMahon Stadium	26,394	Recap
16	Mon, Oct 9	2:00 p.m. EDT	vs. Edmonton Eskimos	L 24–42	3–12	TSN/RDS	Molson Stadium	18,849	Recap
17	Bye								
18	Sun, Oct 22	1:00 p.m. EDT	vs. Hamilton Tiger-Cats	L 16–43	3–13	TSN/RDS/ESPN2	Molson Stadium	20,184	Recap
19	Fri, Oct 27	9:30 p.m. EDT	at Saskatchewan Roughriders	L 12–37	3–14	TSN/RDS	Mosaic Stadium	30,083	Recap
20	Fri, Nov 3	7:00 p.m. EDT	at Hamilton Tiger-Cats	L 0–33	3–15	TSN/RDS	Tim Hortons Field	23,526	Recap

# Games played with colour uniforms.
# Games played with white uniforms.
# Games played with alternate uniforms.

== Roster ==
2017 Montreal Alouettes final roster
Quarterbacks: 16 Antonio Pipkin; 18 Matt Shiltz; 5 Drew Willy; Running backs: 35 Dillon Campbell; 0 Stefan Logan; 38 Nate O'Halloran; 23 Brandon Rutley; 20 Tyrell Sutton; 45 Oumar Touré; Receivers: 83 Stephen Adekolu; 85 B. J. Cunningham; 15 Sam Giguère; 80 S. J. Haidara; 9 Ernest Jackson; 84 George Johnson	Offensive linemen: 58 Luc Brodeur-Jourdain C; 61 Vincent Brown G; 69 Xavier Fulton T; 57 Chris Greaves G/T; 66 Brian Simmopns T; 67 Cory Tucker C; Defensive linemen: 42 Jean-Samuel Blanc DT/DE; 7 John Bowman DE; 94 Fabion Foote DT; 96 Frederick Henry-Ajudua DE; 99 Jesse Joseph DE; 55 Gabe Knapton DE; 93 Don Oramasionwu DT; 99 Jabar Westerman DT; 95 Justin Zimmer DT; Special teams: 37 Martin Bédard LS; 30 Taylor Russolino K/P	Linebackers: 11 Chip Cox; 34 Kyries Hebert; 47 D. J. Lalama; 48 Reggie Northrup; Defensive backs: 32 Tevaughn Campbell; 21 Michael Carter; 31 Mikaël Charland; 44 Branden Dozier; 35 Greg Henderson; 26 Tyree Hollins; 29 Jonathon Mincy; 3 K. J. Morton; 43 Dom Termansen; 25 Dondre Wright; Practice roster: 97 Chad Bushley LS; 87 Geno Lewis WR; -- Timothy Mitchell G	Injured list: 10 Chris Ackie LB; 46 Jean-Christophe Beaulieu FB; 14 Boris Bede K/P; 68 Philip Blake G; 52 Nicolas Boulay LB; 88 Alex Carroll WR; 4 Darian Durant QB; 53 Philippe Gagnon G; 12 Jacory Harris QB; 19 Travis Hawkins DB; 64 Sean Jamieson G; 60 Jeremy Lewis G; 8 Nik Lewis SB; 51 Kristian Matte G; 98 Ivan McLennan DE; 69 Anthony Morris T; 65 Jovan Olafioye T; 82 Alex Pierzchalski WR; 33 Frédéric Plesius LB; 54 Anthony Sarao LB; 72 Keith Shologan DT; 17 Brandon Stewart DB; 36 Daryl Townsend DB; 50 Matt Vonk G; Italics indicate International players

== Coaching staff ==
Montreal Alouettes Staff
Front office: Owner – Bob Wetenhall; President/CEO – Patrick Boivin; General manager – Kavis Reed; Assistant general manager of football operations – Catherine Raîche; Assistant general manager of player personnel – Joe Mack; Assistant director of pro/college scouting – Uzooma Okeke; Senior player personnel executive/salary cap analyst – Justin Casey; Director of us college scouting – Russ Lande; National scouting analyst – Eric Deslauriers; Head coaches: Head coach – Kavis Reed; Assistant head coach –; Offensive coaches: Offensive coordinator –; Quarterbacks – Anthony Calvillo; Offensive line – Paul Charbonneau; Receivers – Jason Hogan; Running backs – André Bolduc; Offensive Consultant - Ken Miller	Defensive coaches: Defensive coordinator –; Linebackers coach – Greg Quick; Defensive line coach – Kit Lathrop; Defensive backs coach – Billy Parker; Special teams coaches: Special teams coordinator – Bruce Read; Special teams assistant – Derek Wendel; → Coaching staff
