= 2017 Hamilton Tiger-Cats season =

Season of Canadian Football League team the Hamilton Tiger-Cats

- General manager: Eric Tillman
- Head coach: Kent Austin (0–8), June Jones (6–4)
- Home stadium: Tim Hortons Field

Results
- Record: 6–12
- Division place: 3rd, East
- Playoffs: did not qualify
- Team MOP: Larry Dean
- Team MOC: Ryan Bomben
- Team MOR: Richard Leonard

Uniform

The 2017 Hamilton Tiger-Cats season was the 60th season for the team in the Canadian Football League (CFL) and their 68th overall. The Tiger-Cats finished the season in third place in the East Division with a 6–12 record and missed the playoffs for the first time since 2012. After a loss to the Calgary Stampeders on October 13, 2017, followed by an Ottawa Redblacks win later that night, the Tiger-Cats were eliminated from post-season contention.

This was the second season under general manager Eric Tillman and fifth under head coach Kent Austin. After starting the season 0–8, Austin resigned from the head coach position on August 24, giving the post to June Jones, whom Austin had hired initially as assistant head coach three weeks prior. Jones then hired Art Briles as his assistant head coach; within hours, the CFL's league office blocked the hire over Briles' alleged involvement in the Baylor University sexual assault scandal. Jones would finish the season 6–4 and remain head coach for the 2018 season.

== Offseason ==
=== Negotiation List ===
On March 31, 2017, the Tiger-Cats announced they would be the first CFL team in history to publicly announce the players on their negotiation list. Three players will be announced in each segment of Ticats All Access (a free subscription program); among the first three revealed was former Heisman-winning quarterback Johnny Manziel, who did not sign with the team in 2017 but would join the team in 2018.

=== CFL draft ===
The 2017 CFL draft took place on May 7, 2017. The Tiger-Cats had seven selections in the eight-round draft after trading their fourth round pick and two players for Justin Capicciotti and Xavier Fulton.

Round	Pick	Player	Position	School/Club team	Hometown
1	4	Connor McGough	DL	Calgary	Calgary, AB
2	13	Braden Schram	OL	Calgary	Manning, AB
3	21	Kay Okafor	DL	St. Francis Xavier	Enugu, Nigeria
5	38	Justin Vaughn	DL	Fordham	Hamilton, ON
6	47	Jacob Scarfone	WR	Guelph	London, ON
7	58	Brett Golding	OL	Wilfrid Laurier	Dunnville, ON
8	66	Sean Thomas-Erlington	RB	Montreal	Montreal, QC

== Preseason ==
Week	Date	Kickoff	Opponent	Results		TV	Venue	Attendance	Summary
Week	Date	Kickoff	Opponent	Score	Record	TV	Venue	Attendance	Summary
A	Thurs, June 8	7:30 p.m. EDT	at Ottawa Redblacks	L 29–30	0–1	TSN	TD Place Stadium	23,252	Recap
B	Fri, June 16	7:30 p.m. EDT	vs. Toronto Argonauts	L 16–23	0–2	Ticats.ca	Tim Hortons Field		Recap

== Regular season ==
=== Season standings ===
East Division
Team	GP	W	L	T	Pts	PF	PA	Div	Stk	
Toronto Argonauts	18	9	9	0	18	482	456	6–2	W2	Details
Ottawa Redblacks	18	8	9	1	17	495	452	5–3	W3	Details
Hamilton Tiger-Cats	18	6	12	0	12	443	545	4–4	W1	Details
Montreal Alouettes	18	3	15	0	6	314	580	1–7	L11	Details

=== Season schedule ===
Week	Date	Kickoff	Opponent	Results		TV	Venue	Attendance	Summary
Week	Date	Kickoff	Opponent	Score	Record	TV	Venue	Attendance	Summary
1	Sun, June 25	4:00 p.m. EDT	at Toronto Argonauts	L 15–32	0–1	TSN/ESPN2	BMO Field	13,583	Recap
2	Bye								
3	Sat, July 8	10:00 p.m. EDT	at Saskatchewan Roughriders	L 20–37	0–2	TSN/ESPN2	Mosaic Stadium	33,050	Recap
4	Sat, July 15	7:30 p.m. EDT	vs. BC Lions	L 26–41	0–3	TSN/RDS	Tim Hortons Field	24,135	Recap
5	Thurs, July 20	7:30 p.m. EDT	vs. Edmonton Eskimos	L 28–31	0–4	TSN/RDS2	Tim Hortons Field	23,531	Recap
6	Sat, July 29	9:30 p.m. EDT	at Calgary Stampeders	L 1–60	0–5	TSN	McMahon Stadium	25,492	Recap
7	Fri, Aug 4	8:30 p.m. EDT	at Edmonton Eskimos	L 28–33	0–6	TSN/ESPN2	Commonwealth Stadium	27,078	Recap
8	Sat, Aug 12	7:30 p.m. EDT	vs. Winnipeg Blue Bombers	L 12–39	0–7	TSN/RDS	Tim Hortons Field	23,517	Recap
9	Fri, Aug 18	7:30 p.m. EDT	vs. Ottawa Redblacks	L 18–37	0–8	TSN/RDS	Tim Hortons Field	23,524	Recap
10	Bye								
11	Mon, Sept 4	6:30 p.m. EDT	vs. Toronto Argonauts	W 24–22	1–8	TSN	Tim Hortons Field	23,926	Recap
12	Sat, Sept 9	6:00 p.m. EDT	at Ottawa Redblacks	W 26–22	2–8	TSN/RDS2	TD Place Stadium	24,901	Recap
13	Fri, Sept 15	7:00 p.m. EDT	vs. Saskatchewan Roughriders	L 19–27	2–9	TSN/RDS	Tim Hortons Field	23,604	Recap
14	Fri, Sept 22	11:00 p.m. EDT	at BC Lions	W 24–23	3–9	TSN/ESPN2	BC Place	18,091	Recap
15	Sat, Sept 30	6:30 p.m. EDT	vs. Toronto Argonauts	L 35–43 (OT)	3–10	TSN/RDS2	Tim Hortons Field	24,067	Recap
16	Fri, Oct 6	8:30 p.m. EDT	at Winnipeg Blue Bombers	W 30–13	4–10	TSN	Investors Group Field	26,204	Recap
17	Fri, Oct 13	7:00 p.m. EDT	vs. Calgary Stampeders	L 25–28	4–11	TSN/ESPN2	Tim Hortons Field	23,672	Recap
18	Sun, Oct 22	1:00 p.m. EDT	at Montreal Alouettes	W 43–16	5–11	TSN/RDS/ESPN2	Molson Stadium	20,184	Recap
19	Fri, Oct 27	7:00 p.m. EDT	at Ottawa Redblacks	L 36–41	5–12	TSN	TD Place Stadium	24,781	Recap
20	Fri, Nov 3	7:00 p.m. EDT	vs. Montreal Alouettes	W 33–0	6–12	TSN/RDS	Tim Hortons Field	23,526	Recap

== Roster ==
Hamilton Tiger-Cats 2017 final roster
Quarterbacks: 4 Zach Collaros; 13 Everett Golson; 8 Jeremiah Masoli; Running backs: 15 Alex Green; 46 C. O. Primé; 31 Sean Thomas Erlington; Receivers: 16 Brandon Banks; 7 Shamawd Chambers; 18 Jasper Collins; 81 Felix Faubert-Lussier; 12 Mike Jones; 89 Jalen Saunders; 17 Luke Tasker	Offensive linemen: 64 Ryan Bomben G; 51 Mike Filer C; 65 Brett Golding C; 61 Ryker Mathews T; 57 Brandon Revenberg G; 69 Landon Rice G/T; 61 Tony Washington T; 53 Everton Williams C/G; Defensive linemen: 94 Justin Capicciotti DE; 0 Davon Coleman DT; 95 Ben D'Aguilar DE; 97 Ted Laurent DT; 93 Connor McGough DE; 96 Jason Neill DT; 5 Adrian Tracy DE; 92 Justin Vaughn DT; 49 Nikita Whitlock DT/DE	Linebackers: 44 Mitch Barnett; 33 Terrell Davis; 11 Larry Dean; 45 Geoff Hughes; 21 Simoni Lawrence; 48 Akeem Whonder; Defensive backs: 38 Dante Blackmon; 26 Cariel Brooks; 28 Mariel Cooper; 20 Emanuel Davis; 14 Abdul Kanneh; 30 Jay Langa; 37 Richard Leonard; 22 Courtney Stephen; 39 Don Unamba	Special teams: 91 Kenny Allen K/P; 47 Aaron Crawford LS; 32 Kevin Malcolm LS; Practice roster: 60 Casey Blaser T; 42 Kavell Conner LB; 56 Lamar Holmes T; 40 Ryan Mueller DE; 9 Osagie Odiase DB; 59 Kay Okafor T; 3 Jamal Robinson WR; 36 Ross Scheuerman RB; 55 Braden Schram G	Injured list: 88 Johnny Aprile SB; 99 Mike Atkinson DT; 87 Damarr Aultman WR; 41 Sergio Castillo K/P; 35 Mike Daly DB; 31 Dominique Ellis DB; 90 Evan Gill DT; 29 Keon Lyn DB; 25 Willie Quinn SB; 19 Justin Rogers DB; 23 Nick Shortill LB; 27 Mercer Timmis RB; 80 Terrence Toliver WR; 24 Demond Washington DB; Italics indicate International player

== Coaching staff ==
Hamilton Tiger-Cats Staff
Front office: Caretaker – Bob Young; Chief executive officer – Scott Mitchell; Vice president of football operations – Kent Austin; General manager – Eric Tillman; Assistant gm/director of football operations – Shawn Burke; Assistant gm/director of Canadian scouting – Drew Allemang; Scouting coordinator – Rich Massaro; Video co-ordinator – Matt Allemang; Head coach: Head coach – June Jones; Offensive coaches: Offensive coordinator/receivers – Stefan Ptaszek; Running backs – Corey Grant; Offensive line – Mike Markuson; Offensive quality control – Jarryd Baines; Assistant quarterbacks coach – A. J. Smith	Defensive coaches: Defensive coordinator – Jeff Reinebold; Defensive backs – James Stanley; Defensive line – Dennis McPhee; Defensive assistant – William Fields; Defensive Run Game & Linebackers – Phillip Lolley; Special teams coaches: Special teams coordinator – Dennis McKnight; Special teams assistant – William Fields; → Coaching staff
