= 2018 Montreal Alouettes season =

Canadian football team season

- General manager: Kavis Reed
- Head coach: Mike Sherman
- Home stadium: Percival Molson Memorial Stadium

Results
- Record: 5–13
- Division place: 3rd, East
- Playoffs: did not qualify
- Team MOP: Hénoc Muamba
- Team MOC: Hénoc Muamba
- Team MOR: William Stanback

Uniform

The 2018 Montreal Alouettes season was the 52nd season for the team in the Canadian Football League (CFL) and their 64th overall. The Alouettes improved upon their disappointing 3–15 record from 2017, but still failed to qualify for the playoffs for the fourth straight season, finishing with a 5–13 record.

This was the first season under former NFL head coach Mike Sherman and the second season under general manager Kavis Reed. The Alouettes hosted their training camp for the first time at Olympic Stadium with rookies reporting on May 16 and main camp beginning on May 20.

== Offseason ==
=== CFL draft ===
The 2018 CFL draft took place on May 3, 2018. The Alouettes held the first overall draft pick by virtue of finishing in last place in 2017, but traded it to Hamilton in exchange for the second overall pick and several other picks and players. The Alouettes held ten selections in total, after acquiring another fourth-round pick for Andrew Lue and another sixth-round pick for S. J. Green. The Alouettes traded their second-round pick to Saskatchewan for Darian Durant. They also upgraded their fifth-round pick to a third-round pick in the Vernon Adams trade for Tevaughn Campbell.

Round	Pick	Player	Position	School	Hometown
1	2	Trey Rutherford	OL	UConn	Markham, ON
3	19	Bo Banner	DL	Central Washington	Bellingham, WA
3	23	Jean-Gabriel Poulin	LB	Western	Saint-Nicolas, QC
4	27	K. C. Bakker	OT	Carleton	London, ON
5	38	Ryder Stone	RB	Dartmouth	Calgary, AB
6	46	Paul Kozachuk	LB	Toronto	London, ON
6	51	Étienne Moisan	WR	Laval	Saint-Eustache, QC
7	52	Khadim Mbaye	LB	Ottawa	Montreal, QC
7	56	Richmond Nketiah	WR	Waterloo	Brampton, ON
8	61	Lekan Idowu	DB	Waterloo	Houston, TX

== Preseason ==
=== Schedule ===
Week	Date	Kickoff	Opponent	Results		TV	Venue	Attendance	Summary
Week	Date	Kickoff	Opponent	Score	Record	TV	Venue	Attendance	Summary
A	Bye								
B	Thurs, May 31	7:30 p.m. EDT	at Ottawa Redblacks	L 7–27	0–1	TSN/RDS	TD Place Stadium	20,539	Recap
C	Sat, June 9	12:00 p.m. EDT	vs. Hamilton Tiger-Cats	L 15–30	0–2	TSN/RDS	Molson Stadium	12,325	Recap

# Games played with white uniforms.

== Regular season ==
In recognition of the Alouettes' storied history, the team featured a different helmet logo, drawn in red and white only, for each of the first three months of the season. Helmets worn in June featured the team logo from 1949 to 1969, July featured the team logo from 1970 to 1973 and August featured the team logo from 1974 to 1986. Helmets worn from Week 14 to the end of the season had the team's then-current logo, from 1996 to 2018.

=== Standings ===
East Division
Team	GP	W	L	T	Pts	PF	PA	Div	Stk	
Ottawa Redblacks	18	11	7	0	22	464	420	6–2	W3	Details
Hamilton Tiger-Cats	18	8	10	0	16	513	456	4–4	L3	Details
Montreal Alouettes	18	5	13	0	10	345	512	4–4	W2	Details
Toronto Argonauts	18	4	14	0	8	369	560	2–6	L2	Details

=== Schedule ===
Week	Game	Date	Kickoff	Opponent	Results		TV	Venue	Attendance	Summary
Week	Game	Date	Kickoff	Opponent	Score	Record	TV	Venue	Attendance	Summary
1	1	Sat, June 16	10:00 p.m. EDT	@ BC Lions	L 10–22	0–1	TSN/RDS/ESPN2	BC Place	20,182	Recap
2	2	Fri, June 22	7:00 p.m. EDT	Winnipeg Blue Bombers	L 10–56	0–2	TSN/RDS/ESPN2	Molson Stadium	19,498	Recap
3	3	Sat, June 30	9:00 p.m. EDT	@ Saskatchewan Roughriders	W 23–17	1–2	TSN/RDS	Mosaic Stadium	33,308	Recap
4	4	Fri, July 6	7:30 p.m. EDT	Ottawa Redblacks	L 18–28	1–3	TSN/RDS	Molson Stadium	16,718	Recap
5	Bye									
6	5	Sat, July 21	9:00 p.m. EDT	@ Calgary Stampeders	L 8–25	1–4	TSN/RDS/ESPN2	McMahon Stadium	26,440	Recap
7	6	Thurs, July 26	7:30 p.m. EDT	Edmonton Eskimos	L 23–44	1–5	TSN/RDS	Molson Stadium	16,654	Recap
8	7	Fri, Aug 3	7:30 p.m. EDT	Hamilton Tiger-Cats	L 11–50	1–6	TSN/RDS/ESPN2	Molson Stadium	18,576	Recap
9	8	Sat, Aug 11	8:00 p.m. EDT	@ Ottawa Redblacks	L 17–24	1–7	TSN/RDS	TD Place Stadium	25,161	Recap
10	9	Sat, Aug 18	9:00 p.m. EDT	@ Edmonton Eskimos	L 24–40	1–8	TSN/RDS/ESPN2	Commonwealth Stadium	29,702	Recap
11	10	Fri, Aug 24	7:30 p.m. EDT	Toronto Argonauts	W 25–22	2–8	TSN/RDS	Molson Stadium	16,480	Recap
12	11	Fri, Aug 31	7:30 p.m. EDT	@ Ottawa Redblacks	W 21–11	3–8	TSN/RDS	TD Place Stadium	25,132	Recap
13	Bye									
14	12	Fri, Sept 14	7:30 p.m. EDT	BC Lions	L 14–32	3–9	TSN/RDS	Molson Stadium	15,346	Recap
15	13	Fri, Sept 21	8:30 p.m. EDT	@ Winnipeg Blue Bombers	L 14–31	3–10	TSN/RDS	Investors Group Field	24,349	Recap
16	14	Sun, Sept 30	1:00 p.m. EDT	Saskatchewan Roughriders	L 29–34	3–11	TSN/RDS/ESPN2	Molson Stadium	18,370	Recap
17	15	Mon, Oct 8	1:00 p.m. EDT	Calgary Stampeders	L 6–12	3–12	TSN/RDS	Molson Stadium	16,764	Recap
18	Bye									
19	16	Sat, Oct 20	4:00 p.m. EDT	@ Toronto Argonauts	L 22–26	3–13	TSN/RDS	BMO Field		Recap
20	17	Sun, Oct 28	1:00 p.m. EDT	Toronto Argonauts	W 40–10	4–13	TSN/RDS/ESPN2	Molson Stadium	17,583	Recap
21	18	Sat, Nov 3	7:00 p.m. EDT	@ Hamilton Tiger-Cats	W 30–28	5–13	TSN/RDS	Tim Hortons Field	23,381	Recap

# Games played with colour uniforms.
# Games played with white uniforms.
# Games played with alternate uniforms.

== Roster ==
2018 Montreal Alouettes final roster
Quarterbacks: 8 Vernon Adams; 2 Johnny Manziel; 17 Antonio Pipkin; 18 Matt Shiltz; Running backs: 0 Stefan Logan; 35 Lawrence Pittman; 31 William Stanback; Receivers: 83 Stephen Adekolu; 19 Adarius Bowman; 89 T. J. Graham; 9 Ernest Jackson; 84 George Johnson; 87 Geno Lewis; 82 Joshua Stanford	Offensive linemen: 61 Zach Annen G/C; 58 Luc Brodeur-Jourdain C; 53 Philippe Gagnon G; 50 Dillon Guy G; 57 Sean Jamieson T; 51 Kristian Matte C/G; 69 Na'Ty Rodgers T; 67 Tony Washington T; Defensive linemen: 90 Bo Banner DE; 97 Woody Baron DT; 42 Jean-Samuel Blanc DE; 7 John Bowman DE; 98 Ryan Brown DT; 94 Fabion Foote DT; 99 Jesse Joseph DE/DT; 55 Gabe Knapton DE	Linebackers: 52 Nicolas Boulay; 40 Brandon Calver; 11 Chip Cox; 34 Glenn Love; 10 Henoc Muamba; 49 Jean-Gabriel Poulin; Defensive backs: 26 Tevaughn Campbell; 23 Tommie Campbell; 30 Ty Cranston; 1 Branden Dozier; 36 Paul Kozachuk; 24 T. J. Heath; 33 Greg Reid; 29 Jermaine Robinson; Special teams: 37 Martin Bédard LS; 14 Boris Bede K/P	Practice list: 88 Malcolm Carter WR; 44 Kevin Haynes LB; 95 Khadim Mbaye DE; 65 Devonte McClain T; Injured list: 17 Joe Burnett DB; 85 B. J. Cunningham SB; 93 Faith Ekakitie DT; 3 Dominique Ellis DB; 60 Tyler Johnstone T; 47 D. J. Lalama LB; 4 Jeff Mathews QB; 15 Najee Murray CB; 66 Trey Rutherford G; 32 Ryder Stone RB; 99 Jabar Westerman DT; 12 Mitchell White CB; 5 Drew Willy QB; 25 Dondre Wright DB; Suspended list: Lekan Idowu DB; Italics indicate International players

== Coaching staff ==
Montreal Alouettes Staff
Front office: Owner – Bob Wetenhall; President/CEO – Patrick Boivin; General manager – Kavis Reed; Assistant general manager of player personnel – Joe Mack; Director of national scouting – Miles Gorrell; Director of college scouting – Russ Lande; Director of research – Charles Raizenne; National scout – Eric Deslauriers; Head coach: Head coach – Mike Sherman; Special Assistant to the Head Coach - Ben Sherman; Offensive coaches: Offensive Coordinator & Quarterbacks – Khari Jones; Offensive line and run game coordinator – Paul Dunn; Outside Wide Receivers - André Barboza; Receivers – Jason Tucker; Running backs – André Bolduc	Defensive coaches: Defensive coordinator – Rich Stubler; Linebackers coach – Todd Howard; Defensive line coach – Bert Hill; Defensive backs coach – Billy Parker; Special teams coaches: Special teams coordinator – Mickey Donovan; Special teams assistant – Anthony Ierullo; → Coaching staff
