= Dondre =

Dondre, or Dondré , is a masculine given name. Notable people with the given name include:

- Dondre Gilliam (born 1977), American football player
- Dondré Whitfield (born 1969), American actor
- Dondre Wright (born 1994), Canadian football player
