= Nate Behar =

Canadian gridiron football player (born 1994)

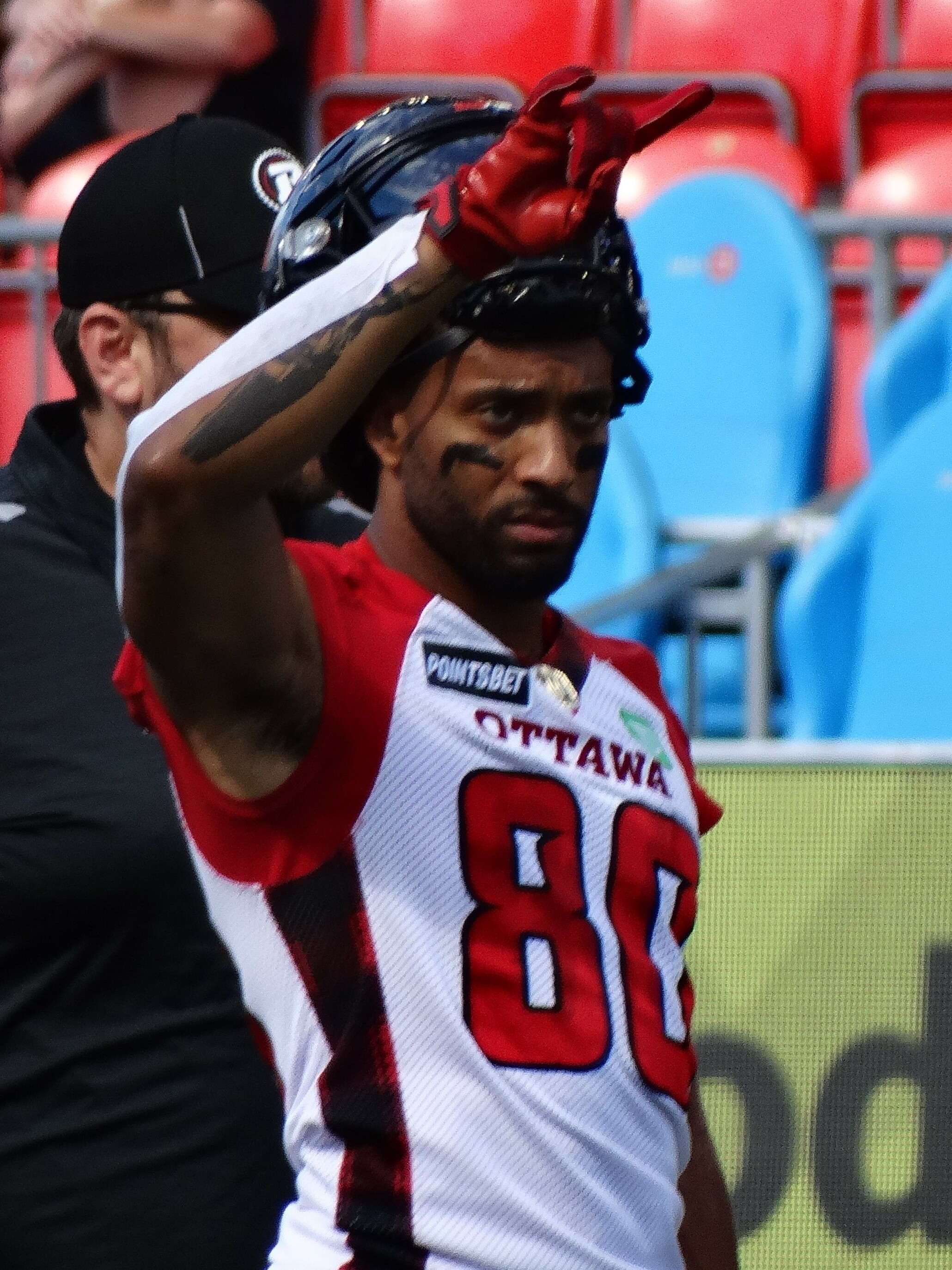
- Behar with the Redblacks in 2022

Profile
- Position: Wide receiver

Personal information
- Born: September 29, 1994 (age 32); London, Ontario, Canada
- Listed height: 5 ft 11 in (1.80 m)
- Listed weight: 204 lb (93 kg)

Career information
- University: Carleton
- CFL draft: 2017: 1st round, 5th overall pick

Career history
- 2017–2018: Edmonton Eskimos
- 2019: Ottawa Redblacks
- 2021–2023: Ottawa Redblacks
- 2024: Montreal Alouettes
- Stats at CFL.ca

Nathaniel Behar (born September 29, 1994) is a Canadian former professional football wide receiver. He most recently played for the Montreal Alouettes of the Canadian Football League (CFL). He played for two years with the Edmonton Eskimos prior to signing with the Ottawa Redblacks in 2019. He played U Sports football for the Carleton Ravens from 2013 to 2016.

== University career ==
=== Carleton Ravens ===
On November 16, 2012, it was announced that Behar had signed a letter of intent to play for the Carleton Ravens' re-established program which began in 2013. He had been ranked as the number one high school wide receiver prospect in the country. He enjoyed a productive four-year career with the Ravens; totaling 178 receptions for 2,577 yards, and 21 touchdowns. His most famous touchdown, arguably, was on a last-play Hail Mary pass to win the 2014 Panda Game. At the end of his four-years, he was ranked as the ninth best player available in the 2017 CFL draft.

== Professional career ==
Pre-draft measurables
Height	Weight	40-yard dash	20-yard shuttle	Three-cone drill	Vertical jump	Broad jump	Bench press
5 ft 11 3/8 in (1.81 m)	204 lb (93 kg)	4.61 s	4.25 s	7.29 s	31.5 in (0.80 m)	9 ft 7 in (2.92 m)	22 reps
All values from CFL Combine

=== Edmonton Eskimos ===
Behar was drafted fifth overall by the Edmonton Eskimos in the 2017 CFL draft, but held off signing with the team as he and his agent entered a contract dispute with the club. He missed the team's rookie camp and training camp and was reportedly dissatisfied with the negotiation process as his contract offer became worse the longer he held out. Behar signed with the Eskimos on June 21, 2017, three days before the team's season opening game, to a two-year contract. He played in 12 regular season games that year, primarily on special teams as he recorded four special teams tackles. In 2018, he played in all 18 regular season games and started eight, recording 27 catches for 257 receiving yards. He scored his first touchdown on August 9, 2018 against the BC Lions. He played in 30 regular season games with the Eskimos and became a free agent upon the expiry of his contract on February 12, 2019. Behar announced his retirement from professional football on March 19, 2025.

=== Ottawa Redblacks ===
On February 15, 2019, Behar signed with the Ottawa Redblacks to, reportedly, a one-year contract. In his first season in Ottawa, he caught 16 passes for 169 yards. He became a free agent upon the expiry of his contract on February 11, 2020, and did not sign with any team in 2020, where the league cancelled the 2020 CFL season.

After not playing football in 2020, Behar re-signed with the Redblacks on June 28, 2021. During the 2021 season, he played in all 14 regular season games, catching 34 passes for 439 yards, both career highs. He was also the team's emergency quarterback and was pressed into duty on September 22, 2021, when both Dominique Davis and Matt Nichols succumbed to injuries. In that game, he played in two series where he had two carries for three yards and one completed pass for three yards. On January 20, 2022, Behar signed a one-year extension to remain with the Redblacks. Behar continued his strong play into the 2022 season posting new career highs in receptions (59), receiving yards (727), and touchdowns (2), despite missing five games due to injury.

On December 16, 2022, Behar and the Redblacks agreed to a two-year contract extension. He played in 12 regular season games in 2023 where he had 39 receptions for 334 yards and one touchdown. In the following off-season, he was released on February 5, 2024, while still being owed $30,000 on his partially guaranteed contract for 2024.

=== Montreal Alouettes ===
On July 20, 2024, it was announced that Behar had signed with the Montreal Alouettes. He played in 12 games where he had nine catches for 89 yards. He became a free agent upon the expiry of his contract on February 11, 2025.
