= Christophe Mulumba-Tshimanga =

Canadian football player (born 1993)

No. 10
- Position: Linebacker

Personal information
- Born: January 6, 1993 (age 33); Zaire
- Listed height: 6 ft 1 in (1.85 m)
- Listed weight: 245 lb (111 kg)

Career information
- High school: Kent School (Kent, Connecticut)
- College: Maine
- CFL draft: 2017: 3rd round, 22nd overall pick

Career history
- 2017–2019: Edmonton Eskimos
- 2020–2021: Ottawa Redblacks

Awards and highlights
- 2013 FCS Defensive Rookie of the Year; 2013 CAA Rookie of the Year; 3x first-team CAA All-Conference (2013, 2014, 2016); 3x All New-England (2013, 2014, 2016)
- Stats at CFL.ca

Christophe Mulumba-Tshimanga (born January 6, 1993), sometimes called Chris Mulumba, is a former professional Canadian football linebacker and special teams player who played in the Canadian Football League (CFL). Born in Zaire and raised in Montreal, he attended the Kent School (class of 2012) in Connecticut before playing college football with the University of Maine Black Bears.

== Professional career ==
Mulumba-Tshimanga was drafted in the third round (22nd overall) of the 2017 CFL draft by the Edmonton Eskimos. Prior to signing with Edmonton, he received a tryout with the Tampa Bay Buccaneers. On July 28, 2017, he made his first start at linebacker, following injuries to Cory Greenwood, Adam Konar and Blair Smith. He played in 43 games over three season, recording 53 defensive tackles, 34 special teams tackles, five sacks, and four forced fumbles. He became a free agent on February 11, 2020 and signed with the Ottawa Redblacks to a one-year contract that same day. He re-signed with the Redblacks on February 5, 2021. He was placed on the suspended list on July 9, 2021.
