= Junior Luke =

Canadian football player (born 1991)

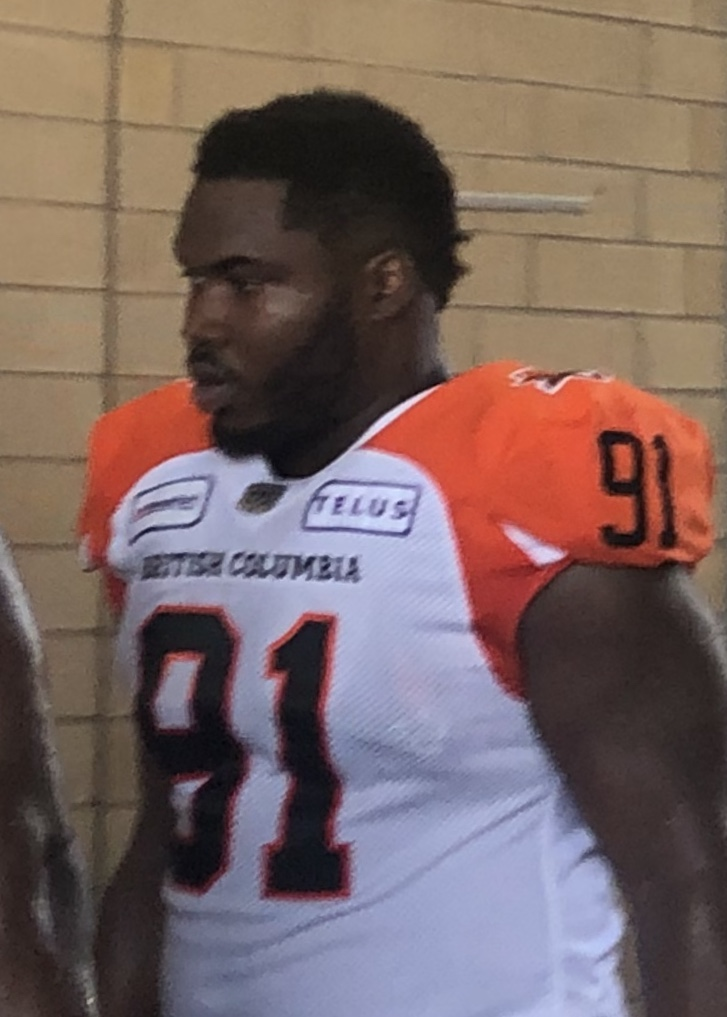
- Luke with the BC Lions in 2019

Profile
- Position: Defensive lineman

Personal information
- Born: November 1, 1991 (age 35); Montreal, Quebec, Canada
- Listed height: 6 ft 3 in (1.91 m)
- Listed weight: 291 lb (132 kg)

Career information
- University: Montreal
- CFL draft: 2017: 1st round, 7th overall pick

Career history
- 2017–2019: BC Lions
- 2020–2021: Montreal Alouettes*
- * Offseason or practice squad member only

Awards and highlights
- Vanier Cup champion (2014)
- Stats at CFL.ca

Junior Luke (born November 1, 1991) is a Canadian former professional football defensive lineman who played for the BC Lions of the Canadian Football League (FCFL). He was also a member of the CFL's Montreal Alouettes.

== University career ==
Luke played U Sports football with the Montreal Carabins where he was a member of the 50th Vanier Cup championship team.

== Professional career ==
Pre-draft measurables
| Height | Weight | 40-yard dash | 20-yard shuttle | Vertical jump | Broad jump | Bench press |
|---|---|---|---|---|---|---|
| 6 ft 1 1/2 in (1.87 m) | 291 lb (132 kg) | 5.18 s | 4.69 s | 24.0 in (0.61 m) | 8 ft 2 3/4 in (2.51 m) | 24 reps |
All values from CFL Combine

=== BC Lions ===
Luke was ranked as the 11th best player in the Canadian Football League’s Amateur Scouting Bureau final rankings for players eligible in the 2017 CFL draft. He was selected in the first round and seventh overall by the BC Lions in the 2017 CFL draft and signed with the team on May 24, 2017. He played for the Lions for three years in 53 games where he had 25 defensive tackles, four sacks, and one interception.

=== Montreal Alouettes ===
Luke joined the Montreal Alouettes as a free agent on February 12, 2020. However, the 2020 CFL season was cancelled and he re-signed with the Alouettes on December 17, 2020. He spent the entire 2021 season on the practice roster and was released on November 29, 2021.
