= Paul Kozachuk =

Canadian football player (born 1994)

Profile
- Position: Linebacker

Personal information
- Born: May 12, 1994 (age 32); London, Ontario, Canada
- Listed height: 5 ft 11 in (1.80 m)
- Listed weight: 220 lb (100 kg)

Career information
- High school: Oakridge Secondary
- College: Toronto
- CFL draft: 2018: 6th round, 46th overall pick

Career history
- 2018–2019: Montreal Alouettes
- 2020–2021: Toronto Argonauts*
- 2021: Montreal Alouettes
- * Offseason or practice squad member only
- Stats at CFL.ca

Paul Kozachuk (born May 12, 1994) is a Canadian former professional football linebacker who played in the Canadian Football League (CFL). He played U Sports football for the Toronto Varsity Blues from 2014 to 2017.

== Professional career ==
Pre-draft measurables
Height	Weight	40-yard dash	20-yard shuttle	Three-cone drill	Vertical jump	Broad jump	Bench press
5 ft 11 1/2 in (1.82 m)	212 lb (96 kg)	4.81 s	4.33 s	7.49 s	39.0 in (0.99 m)	10 ft 1 1/4 in (3.08 m)	17 reps
All values from CFL Combine

=== Montreal Alouettes (first stint) ===
Kozachuk was drafted by the Montreal Alouettes in the sixth round, 46th overall, in the 2018 CFL draft and signed with the club on May 19, 2018. He made his professional debut on June 16, 2018 against the BC Lions. For the 2018 season, he played in 13 regular season games, recording nine special teams tackles. In 2019, he played in 17 regular season games, where he had one defensive tackle and eight special teams tackles. He made his post-season debut in the team's East Semi-Final loss to the Edmonton Eskimos where he had one special teams tackle.

=== Toronto Argonauts ===
After becoming a free agent, Kozachuk signed with the Toronto Argonauts on February 18, 2020. However, he did not play in 2020 due to the cancellation of the 2020 CFL season and was re-signed on February 17, 2021. He was later released on May 18, 2021.

=== Montreal Alouettes (second stint) ===
On September 14, 2021, it was announced that Kozachuk had re-signed with the Alouettes to a practice roster agreement. He became a free agent after the 2021 season.
