= Qadr Spooner =

Canadian football player (born 1992)

No. 65
- Position: Offensive lineman

Personal information
- Born: August 7, 1992 (age 34); Brossard, Quebec, Canada
- Listed height: 6 ft 4 in (1.93 m)
- Listed weight: 314 lb (142 kg)

Career information
- High school: Centennial Regional High School
- College: McGill
- CFL draft: 2017: 2nd round, 15th overall pick

Career history
- Winnipeg Blue Bombers (2017–2018); Edmonton Eskimos (2019)*
- * Offseason or practice squad member only
- Stats at CFL.ca

Qadr (kah-DAR) Spooner (born August 7, 1992) is a Canadian former professional football offensive lineman. Spooner was also a defensive lineman when he played as a kid, before one of his midget football coaches converted him. Nicknamed "The French Freak", he was selected by the Blue Bombers as the 15th overall pick in the 2017 draft out of McGill University.

== Early life ==
Qadr Spooner, born and raised in Brossard, Québec, grew up with his two younger brothers, who shared his love of football. His father wasn't around much, while his mother was constantly working. He played bantam football with the Greenfield Park Packers, in which he played as a defensive lineman. He also played at the midget level of football, while he attended Centennial High School.

During this time, his long-time D-line coach, Jim Gingera, noticed that even though Spooner stood out as a D-lineman, he knew he would also make offensive lineman. In his second year of midget, his team, the Packers, were short of men on the O-line and so Spooner was put there for the time being. He much preferred being a defensive lineman but he did excel greatly on the O-line.

After some trouble at his school and being at risk of dropping out, he left Centennial and went to an alternate program to focus on academics. There, his teacher really helped him get back on track with school, while also balancing a job to stay out of poverty, and he left the program early to go back to Centennial, where he graduated on time.

== College career ==
After graduating from Centennial, Spooner attended Vanier College in Montréal, Québec. There, he played for their football team, the Vanier Cheetahs. He continued to play more and more as an offensive lineman, still not too keen on it. While studying special care counseling and keeping a job, Spooner played for the Cheetahs for three years. By that time, he finally accepted being a full-time offensive lineman.

Spooner finished off his college career at McGill University in Montréal, where he played for the McGill Redmen.

== Professional career ==
Pre-draft measurables
Height	Weight	40-yard dash	20-yard shuttle	Three-cone drill	Vertical jump	Broad jump	Bench press
6 ft 3 1/2 in (1.92 m)	312 lb (142 kg)	5.57 s	5.06 s	8.44 s	23.0 in (0.58 m)	7 ft 11 3/4 in (2.43 m)	31 reps
All values from CFL Combine

Coming out of McGill, Spooner was a high-ranking prospect heading toward the 2017 draft. The CFL Scouting Bureau ranked Spooner as the 13th best prospect, and 5th best offensive lineman, after seeing him in the combine. There, he tied with D-lineman Mathieu Dupuis with the third best bench press, at 31 reps. Spooner would then go on to be selected by the Winnipeg Blue Bombers in the second round, as the 15th overall pick in the draft.

=== Winnipeg Blue Bombers ===
Spooner spent his entire 2017 rookie season on the Blue Bombers' practice squad. He also turned down an offer to go to the BC Lions mid-season.

Prior to the 2018 season, Spooner got taken off the practice squad and was placed as a backup offensive lineman, but some time early in the season, he was placed on the Bombers' six-game injured list. He would only appear in one game all season, another reason for that is the suspension he served.

==== Suspension ====
About halfway through the 2018 season, Spooner tested positive for methasterone, an anabolic steroid, which is banned by the CFL and the Canadian Football League Players' Association (CFLPA). He faced a two game suspension for his first offense during weeks 9 & 10 of the season. According to Spooner, he had no idea how that got in his body and denied any knowledge of taking it.

=== Edmonton Eskimos ===
On February 21, 2019, the Edmonton Eskimos announced that they had signed Spooner through the 2019 season.
