= Geoff Gray =

Canadian gridiron football player (born 1994)

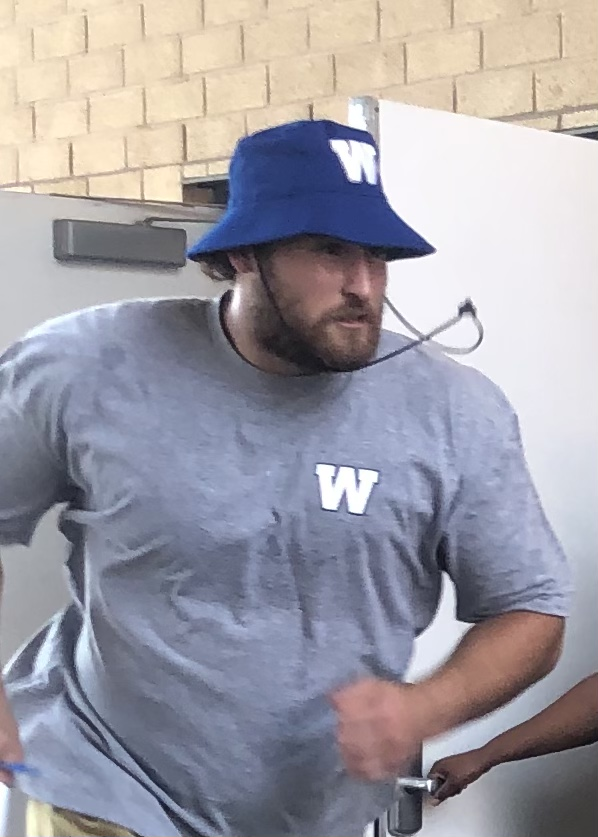
- Gray with the Winnipeg Blue Bombers in 2021

No. 68
- Position: Offensive lineman

Personal information
- Born: November 8, 1994 (age 31); Winnipeg, Manitoba, Canada
- Listed height: 6 ft 6 in (1.98 m)
- Listed weight: 310 lb (141 kg)

Career information
- High school: University of Winnipeg Collegiate (Winnipeg, Manitoba, Canada)
- University: Manitoba
- CFL draft: 2017: 1st round, 8th overall pick

Career history
- Green Bay Packers (2017)*; New York Jets (2017)*; Cleveland Browns (2017); Winnipeg Blue Bombers (2018–2023)
- * Offseason or practice squad member only

Awards and highlights
- 2× Grey Cup champion (2019, 2021); Governor General of Canada Academic All-Canadian Athlete (2017)
- Stats at Pro Football Reference
- Stats at CFL.ca

Geoff Gray (born November 8, 1994) is a Canadian professional football offensive lineman. He was drafted eighth overall in the 2017 CFL draft by the Winnipeg Blue Bombers. He played U Sports football for the Manitoba Bisons.

== Professional career ==
=== Green Bay Packers ===
Gray signed with the Green Bay Packers as an undrafted free agent on May 5, 2017. He was waived by the Packers on September 2, 2017.

=== New York Jets ===
On September 4, 2017, Gray was signed to the New York Jets' practice squad.

=== Cleveland Browns ===
On December 13, 2017, Gray was signed by the Cleveland Browns off the Jets' practice squad. He was on the team's active roster for the final three weeks of the regular season but did not play any. He was waived on August 28, 2018.

=== Winnipeg Blue Bombers ===
On October 15, 2018, Gray signed with the Winnipeg Blue Bombers through to the 2020 CFL season. He played in his first professional game on November 3, 2018, against the Edmonton Eskimos, which was his only game played that year. In the 2019 season, he started the first 12 games of the season as Winnipeg began with a 9–3 record. After Patrick Neufeld returned from injury, Gray was a back-up offensive linemen and spent most of the remainder of the season on the injured list. Despite not playing in the 107th Grey Cup, Gray became a Grey Cup champion after the Blue Bombers defeated the Hamilton Tiger-Cats in the title game.

Gray signed a one-year contract extension with the Blue Bombers on January 8, 2021. He played in the Grey Cup that year as a member of the Bombers second consecutive championship team (2020 cancelled due to pandemic). In 2022 and 2023, he was a member of the Grey Cup finalist, Bombers, runners up to the Toronto Argonauts and Montreal Alouettes.
