= Justin Senior =

Canadian gridiron football player (born 1994)

No. 65
- Position: Offensive tackle

Personal information
- Born: July 8, 1994 (age 32); Montreal, Quebec, Canada
- Listed height: 6 ft 5 in (1.96 m)
- Listed weight: 329 lb (149 kg)

Career information
- High school: Hargrave Military (Chatham, Virginia, U.S.)
- College: Mississippi State
- NFL draft: 2017: 6th round, 210th overall pick
- CFL draft: 2017: 5th round, 40th overall pick

Career history
- Seattle Seahawks (2017); Kansas City Chiefs (2019)*
- * Offseason or practice squad member only
- Stats at Pro Football Reference

Justin Anthony Senior (born July 8, 1994) is a Canadian-born former American football offensive tackle. He was selected by the Seattle Seahawks in the sixth round of the 2017 NFL draft. He played in college at Mississippi State University.

== College career ==
He committed to Mississippi State out of high school. He started for three years at right tackle: 2014, 2015, and 2016. He was awarded the Kent Hull Trophy, which is given to the best collegiate offensive lineman in Mississippi, after the 2016 season.

== Professional career ==
Pre-draft measurables
Height	Weight	Arm length	Hand span	40-yard dash	10-yard split	20-yard split	20-yard shuttle	Three-cone drill	Vertical jump	Broad jump	Bench press
6 ft 4 5/8 in (1.95 m)	331 lb (150 kg)	34 in (0.86 m)	10 1/4 in (0.26 m)	5.55 s	1.92 s	3.23 s	5.06 s	8.19 s	23.0 in (0.58 m)	8 ft 2 in (2.49 m)	21 reps
All values from NFL Combine, except bench reps from Pro Day

=== Seattle Seahawks ===
Senior was selected by the Seattle Seahawks in the sixth round, 210th overall, in the 2017 NFL draft. Senior was also drafted by the Edmonton Eskimos in the fifth round, 40th overall, in the 2017 CFL draft. On May 12, 2017, the Seahawks signed Senior to a four-year, $2.53 million contract with a signing bonus of $136,179. On August 21, 2017, he was waived/injured by the Seahawks and placed on injured reserve. He was released with an injury settlement on December 12, 2017.

=== Kansas City Chiefs ===
On February 19, 2019, Senior was signed by the Kansas City Chiefs. On June 13, 2019, the Chiefs cut Senior.
