= Fabion Foote =

Canadian gridiron football player (born 1994)

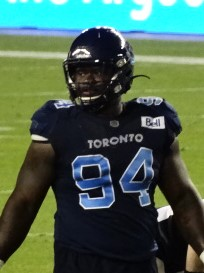
- Foote with the Toronto Argonauts in 2022

No. 94
- Position: Defensive lineman

Personal information
- Born: April 10, 1994 (age 32); Kingston, Jamaica
- Listed height: 6 ft 1 in (1.85 m)
- Listed weight: 285 lb (129 kg)

Career information
- High school: Thistletown C.I.
- University: McMaster
- CFL draft: 2017: 2nd round, 12th overall pick

Career history
- 2017–2019: Montreal Alouettes
- 2020–2022: Toronto Argonauts

Awards and highlights
- Grey Cup champion (2022); Yates Cup champion (2014)
- Stats at CFL.ca

Fabion Foote (born April 10, 1994) is a Jamaican-Canadian former professional football defensive lineman who played in the Canadian Football League (CFL). He played U Sports football with the McMaster Marauders from 2013 to 2016.

== Early life ==
Foote was born in Jamaica, but moved to Toronto with his mother when he was 10 years old.

== Professional career ==
Pre-draft measurables
Height	Weight	40-yard dash	20-yard shuttle	Three-cone drill	Vertical jump	Broad jump	Bench press
6 ft 0 5/8 in (1.84 m)	276 lb (125 kg)	5.00 s	4.50 s	7.72 s	34.5 in (0.88 m)	9 ft 11 in (3.02 m)	20 reps
All values from CFL Combine

=== Montreal Alouettes ===
Foote was drafted by the Montreal Alouettes in the second round, 12th overall, in the 2017 CFL draft and signed with the club on May 17, 2017. He began the 2017 season on the reserve roster for the first three games before being moved to the injured list and then the practice roster. He made his professional debut on October 9, 2017 against the Edmonton Eskimos where he recorded one defensive tackle. He finished the season having played in four regular season games and tallying four defensive tackles.

In 2018, he made the active roster following training camp and recorded his first quarterback sack in the first game of the season on June 16, 2018 against the BC Lions. He finished the year with 11 defensive tackles and two sacks in 16 regular season games.

Foote played in three games in 2019 before being released on July 8, 2019. However, after the team's general manager, Kavis Reed, was fired, Foote was re-signed by the Alouettes on July 16, 2019. He only missed one game in 2019, playing in 17 regular season games where he had 15 defensive tackles, one sack, and one special teams tackle. He also had a field goal block against the Lions on September 28, 2019. Foote played in his first professional post-season game in the East Semi-Final that year, where he recorded two defensive tackles in an Alouettes' loss to the Edmonton Eskimos. In total, he played in 37 regular season games with the Alouettes and had 30 defensive tackles and three sacks.

=== Toronto Argonauts ===
Upon entering free agency, Foote signed with the Toronto Argonauts on February 12, 2020. The move not only brought him back to his Canadian hometown, but also reunited him with his university defensive coordinator, and current Argonauts linebackers coach, Kevin Eiben. However, he did not play in 2020 due to the cancellation of the 2020 CFL season and was released on January 31, 2021. After testing free agency, Foote was re-signed by the Argonauts on February 12, 2021. He was placed on the suspended list on July 11, 2021. He was added back to the active roster on October 8, 2021. He became a free agent after the 2022 season. Foote announced his retirement in June 2023.
