= Antony Auclair =

Canadian football player (born 1993)

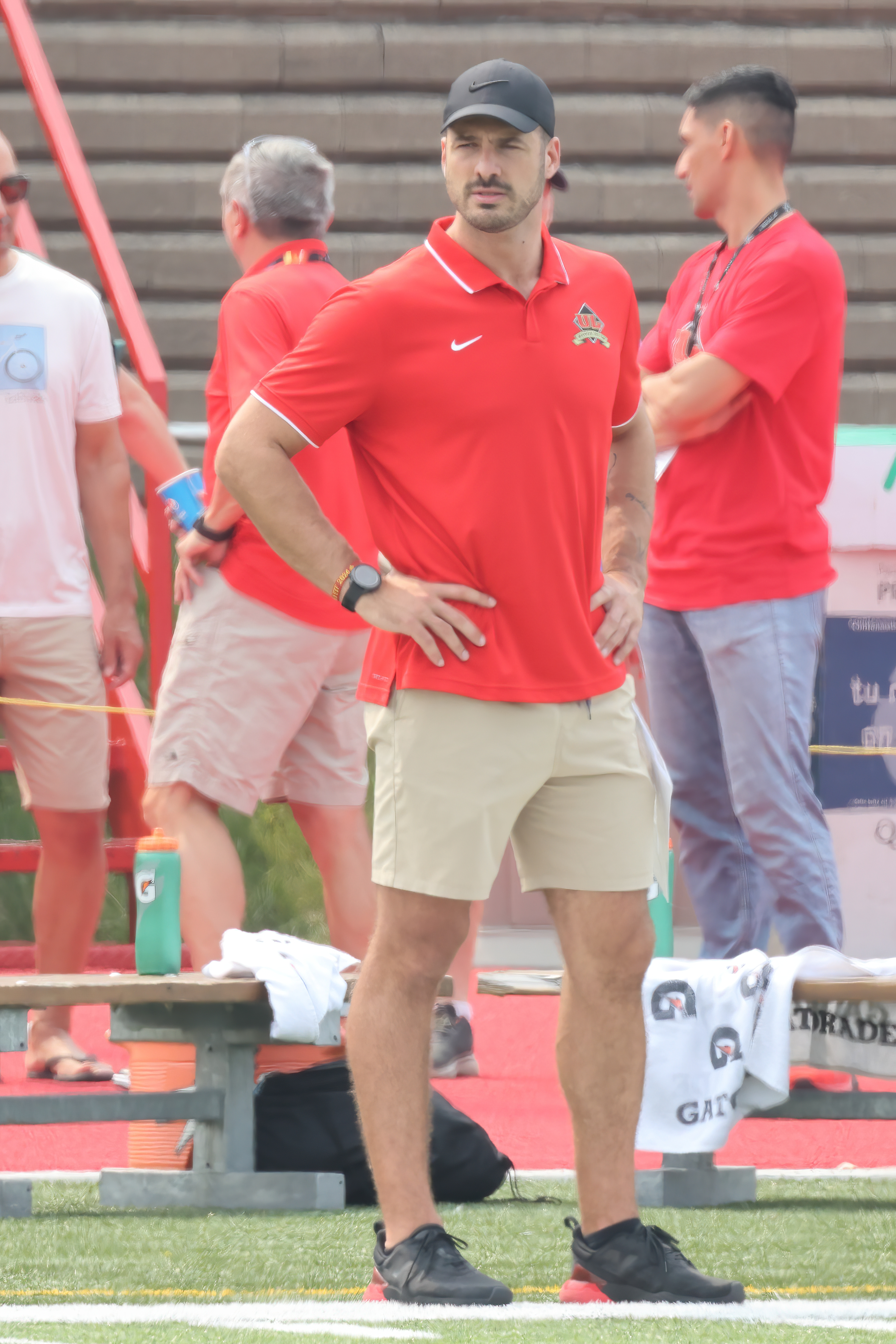
- Auclair in 2024

No. 82, 83
- Position: Tight end

Personal information
- Born: May 28, 1993 (age 33); Notre-Dame-des-Pins, Quebec, Canada
- Listed height: 6 ft 6 in (1.98 m)
- Listed weight: 256 lb (116 kg)

Career information
- College: Champlain-Lennoxville
- University: Laval
- NFL draft: 2017: undrafted
- CFL draft: 2017: 4th round, 30th overall pick

Career history
- Tampa Bay Buccaneers (2017–2020); Houston Texans (2021); Tennessee Titans (2022)*
- * Offseason or practice squad member only

Awards and highlights
- Super Bowl champion (LV)

Career NFL statistics
- Receptions: 15
- Receiving yards: 131
- Receiving touchdowns: 1
- Stats at Pro Football Reference

Antony Auclair (born May 28, 1993) is a Canadian former professional football player who was a tight end in the National Football League (NFL). He played university football at Université Laval, and was signed by the Tampa Bay Buccaneers as an undrafted free agent in 2017, with whom he won Super Bowl LV in 2020. He also played in the NFL for the Houston Texans.

== Professional career ==
=== Tampa Bay Buccaneers ===
Auclair signed with the Tampa Bay Buccaneers as an undrafted free agent on May 1, 2017. He made the Buccaneers' 53-man roster as the only undrafted rookie on the team. He was also drafted by the Saskatchewan Roughriders in the 4th round, with the 30th overall pick, of the 2017 CFL draft.

On November 5, 2019, Auclair was placed on injured reserve.

Auclair re-signed with the Buccaneers on a one-year contract on March 18, 2020. He was placed on injured reserve on September 18, 2020, with a calf injury. He was activated on October 31. Auclair earned a Super Bowl championship when the Buccaneers defeated the Kansas City Chiefs by a score of 31–9 in Super Bowl LV.

=== Houston Texans ===
Auclair signed with the Houston Texans on April 14, 2021. He was released on August 31, 2021, and re-signed to the practice squad. On September 21, Auclair was signed to the active roster. In Week 5 of the 2021 season, he scored his first NFL touchdown against the New England Patriots on an 11–yard reception.

On March 30, 2022, Auclair re-signed with the Texans. He was released on August 30, 2022.

=== Tennessee Titans ===
On October 31, 2022, Auclair signed with the Tennessee Titans' practice squad. Auclair was waived by the Titans on November 21.

On February 1, 2024, Auclair announced his retirement from professional football.

== Flag football ==
Following his time in the NFL, Auclair has played for the Canada men's national flag football team, winning several medals in tournaments and qualifying for the 2028 Olympics.
