= Najee Murray =

American gridiron football player (born 1994)

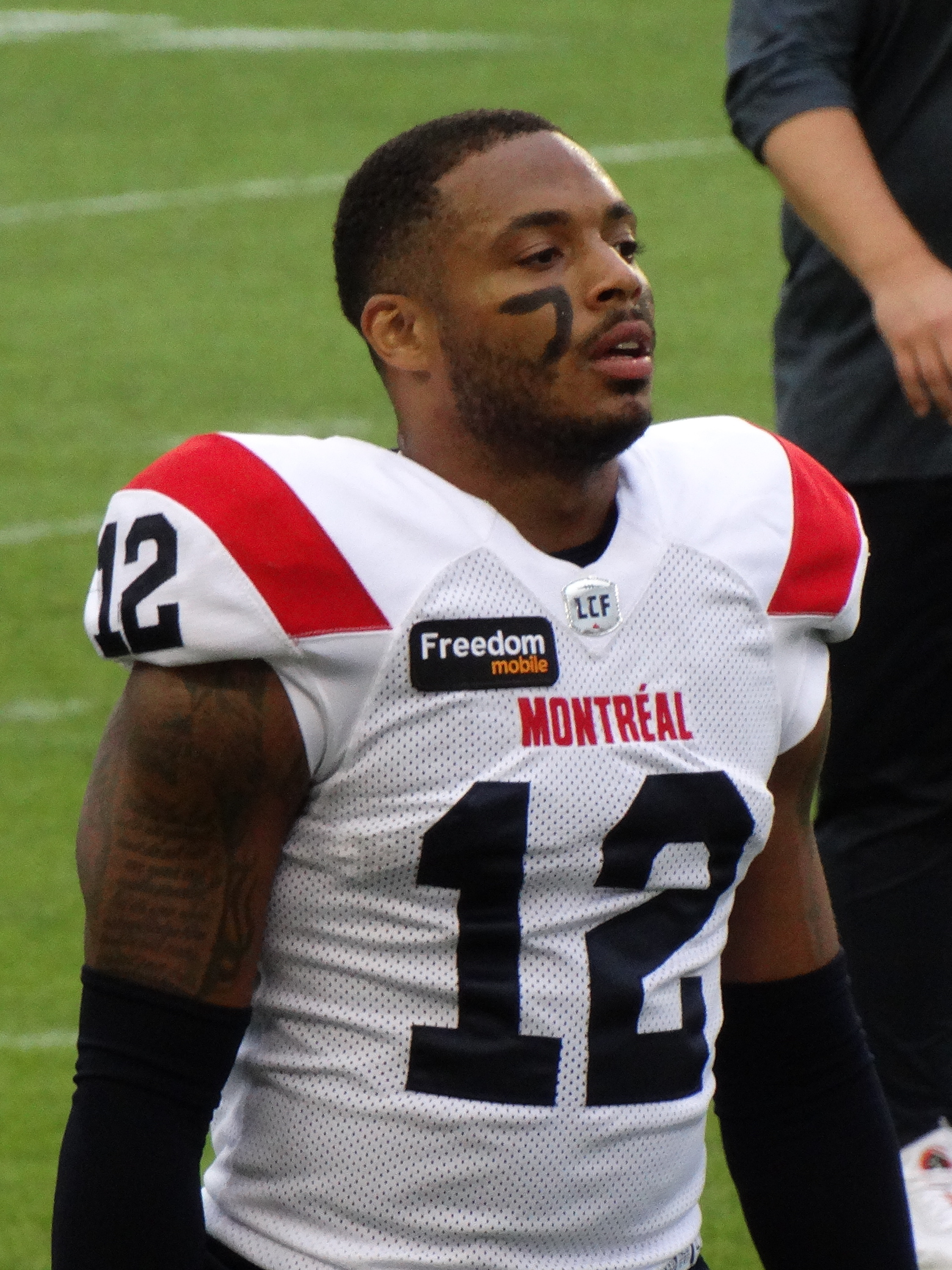
- Murray with the Montreal Alouettes in 2024

No. 12 – Montreal Alouettes
- Position: Defensive back
- Roster status: Active
- CFL status: American

Personal information
- Born: April 21, 1994 (age 32); Steubenville, Ohio, U.S.
- Listed height: 5 ft 9 in (1.75 m)
- Listed weight: 187 lb (85 kg)

Career information
- High school: Steubenville High
- College: Kent State; Ohio State

Career history
- Cleveland Browns (2017)*; Montreal Alouettes (2018–present)
- * Offseason or practice squad member only

Awards and highlights
- Grey Cup champion (2023); First-team All-MAC (2016)
- Stats at CFL.ca

Najee Murray (born April 21, 1994) is an American professional football defensive back for the Montreal Alouettes of the Canadian Football League (CFL).

== College career ==
Murray first played college football for the Ohio State Buckeyes in 2012, where he played in the first six games of the season before becoming injured. He then transferred to Kent State University to play for the Golden Flashes, but sat out the 2013 season due to NCAA transfer rules. He then played from 2014 to 2016 for Kent State.

== Professional career ==
Pre-draft measurables
Height	Weight	Arm length	Hand span	Wingspan	40-yard dash	10-yard split	20-yard split	20-yard shuttle	Three-cone drill	Vertical jump	Broad jump	Bench press
5 ft 8 5/8 in (1.74 m)	182 lb (83 kg)	29 3/4 in (0.76 m)	8 7/8 in (0.23 m)	6 ft 1 3/4 in (1.87 m)	4.54 s	1.59 s	2.65 s	4.05 s	6.83 s	34.0 in (0.86 m)	10 ft 2 in (3.10 m)	15 reps
All values from Pro Day

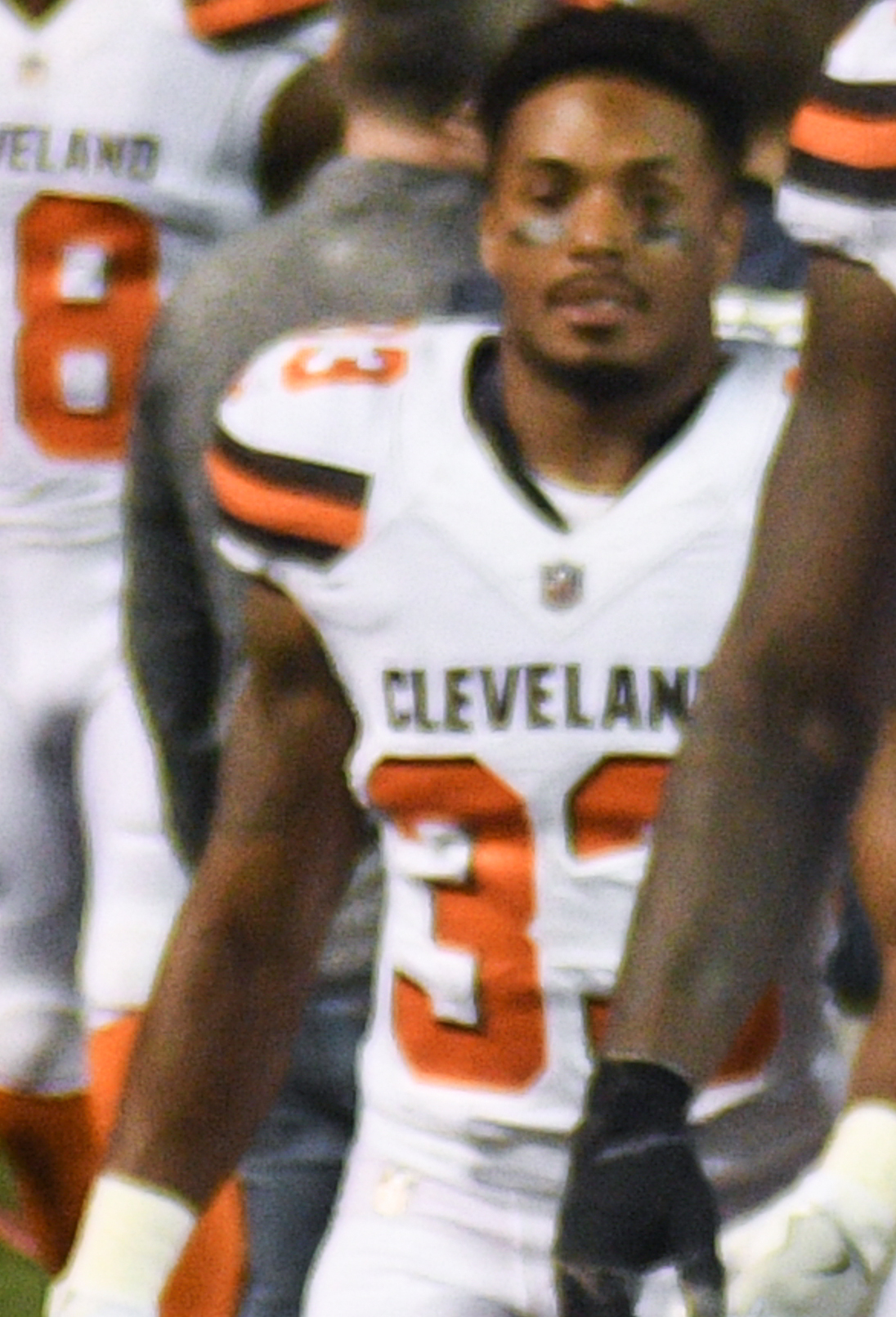
Murray with the Cleveland Browns in 2017

=== Cleveland Browns ===
After not being selected in the 2017 NFL draft, Murray signed with the Cleveland Browns as an undrafted free agent on May 15, 2017. Following training camp, he signed on to the team's practice squad, but was released on September 19, 2017.

=== Montreal Alouettes ===
On April 25, 2018, it was announced that Murray had signed with the Montreal Alouettes. He made the team's active roster following training camp and played in his first professional game on June 16, 2018, against the BC Lions where he had one special teams tackle. He played in the first seven games in 2018 where he had six defensive tackles, two special teams tackles, and one interception, before spending the rest of the season on the injured list. Murray was released during the following off season on May 4, 2019.

On October 2, 2019, Murray re-signed with the Alouettes and played in the last four games of the regular season where he had 16 defensive tackles, one special teams tackle, and one interception. He scored his first career touchdown on November 1, 2019, after intercepting Ottawa Redblacks quarterback Will Arndt and returning the ball 15 yards for the score. He played in his first post-season game on November 10, 2019, in the East Semi-Final loss to the Edmonton Eskimos where he had four defensive tackles.

In 2021, Murray played in 10 out of 14 regular season games where he had 24 defensive tackles, two special teams tackles, three interceptions, and one touchdown. He signed a two-year contract extension with the Alouettes on December 17, 2021.

In the 2022 season, Murray played in 13 regular season games, starting in nine, where he had a career-high 40 defensive tackles, five pass knockdowns, one interception, one sacks, and one forced fumble.

Murray started the first six games of the 2023 season where he had 33 defensive tackles, one interceptions, and one forced fumble. However, he sat out the rest of the season due to injury and was on the injured list when the Alouettes won the 110th Grey Cup.

== Personal life ==
Murray was born in Steubenville, Ohio, to parents Danita Murray-Hampton and Horace Hampton.
