= Ty Cranston =

Canadian gridiron football player (born 1994)

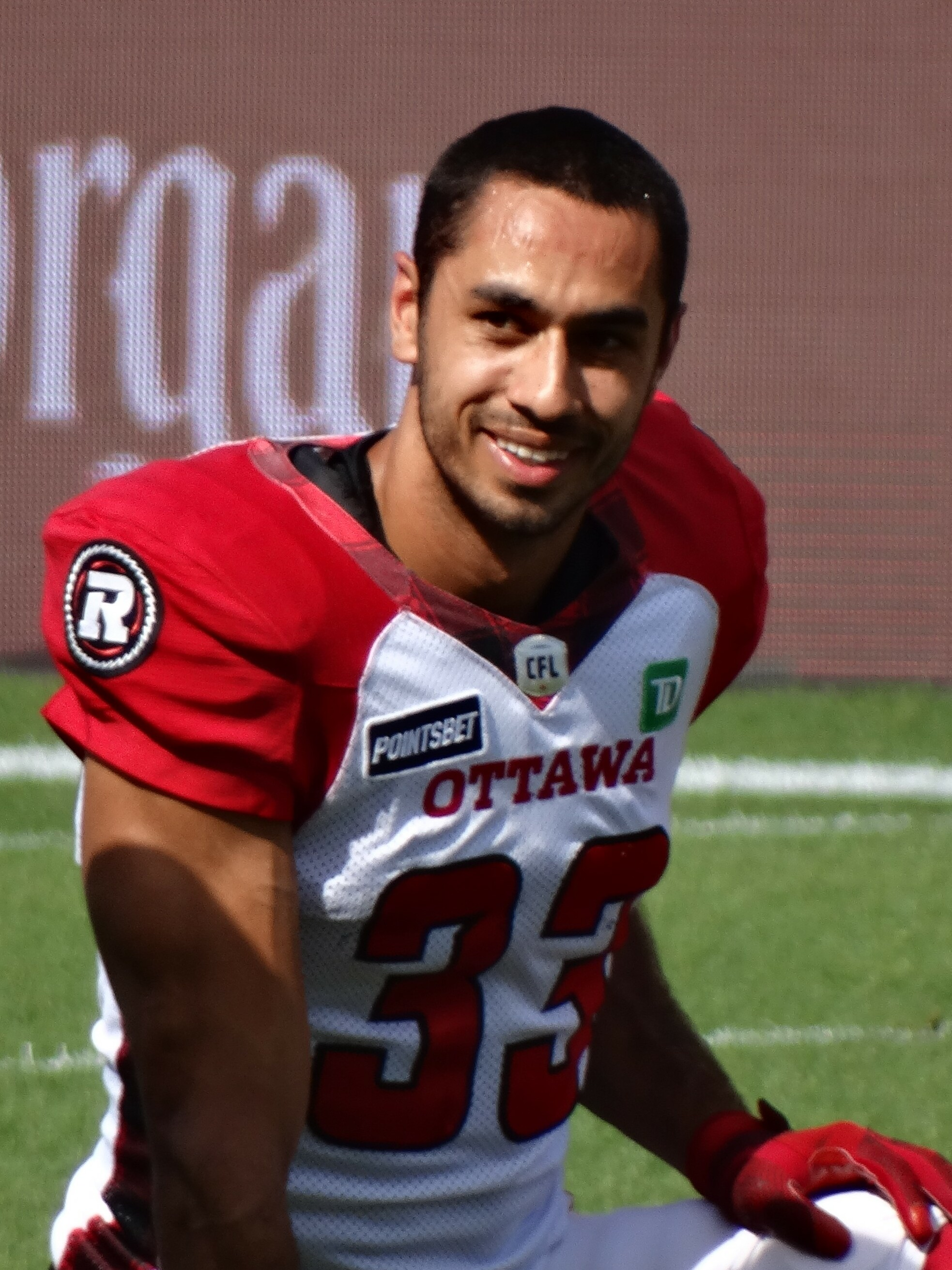
- Cranston with the Ottawa Redblacks in 2022

Profile
- Position: Defensive back

Personal information
- Born: June 17, 1994 (age 32); Winnipeg, Manitoba, Canada
- Listed height: 6 ft 3 in (1.91 m)
- Listed weight: 205 lb (93 kg)

Career information
- High school: St. Paul's High
- University: Ottawa
- CFL draft: 2017: 7th round, 56th overall pick

Career history
- 2017: Montreal Alouettes*
- 2018–2021: Montreal Alouettes
- 2022–2024: Ottawa Redblacks
- * Offseason or practice squad member only
- Stats at CFL.ca

Ty Cranston (born June 17, 1994) is a Canadian professional football defensive back.

== University career ==
Cranston played U Sports football for the Ottawa Gee-Gees from 2013 to 2017. He played in 30 regular season games with the team where he had 129 defensive tackles.

== Professional career ==
=== Montreal Alouettes ===
Cranston was drafted in the seventh round, 56th overall, by the Montreal Alouettes in the 2017 CFL draft and signed with the team on May 19, 2017. He attended training camp with the team that year, but returned to the Gee-Gees to finished his U Sports eligibility. Following the end of the 2017 U Sports football season, Cranston re-signed with the Alouettes to a three-year contract on March 14, 2018.

Cranston began the 2018 Montreal Alouettes season on the suspended list before moving to the practice roster. He then made his regular season professional debut on September 30, 2018, against the Saskatchewan Roughriders where he had one special teams tackle. He played in the rest of the team's games that year and finished with three special teams tackles in five regular season games.

In 2019, Cranston made the team's opening day roster where he recorded his first defensive tackle against the Edmonton Eskimos on June 14, 2019. He played in 16 regular season games in 2019 where he had nine defensive tackles and 13 special teams tackles. He also started two games at safety, including his first career start on June 28, 2019, against the Hamilton Tiger-Cats. However, he was injured near the end of the season and sat out the last game of the year as well as the team's East Semi-Final playoff game.

Due to the cancellation of the 2020 CFL season caused by the COVID-19 pandemic in Canada, Cranston did not play that year. As a pending free agent, he re-signed with the Alouettes on December 15, 2020. He entered the 2021 season as the team's starting safety and recorded a career-high six defensive tackles in the team's opening game against the Edmonton Elks. He became a free agent upon the expiry of his contract on February 8, 2022.

=== Ottawa Redblacks ===
On February 8, 2022, it was announced that Cranston had signed with the Ottawa Redblacks.

== Personal life ==
Cranston's brother, Cody, also played at the defensive back position for the Ottawa Gee-Gees and was drafted by the Montreal Alouettes two years after Ty was drafted.
