= Denzel Radford =

Canadian football player (born 1994)

No. 46
- Position: Defensive back

Personal information
- Born: May 28, 1994 (age 32); Calgary, Alberta, Canada
- Listed height: 6 ft 1 in (1.85 m)
- Listed weight: 198 lb (90 kg)

Career information
- High school: Saint Francis High
- University: Calgary Dinos
- CFL draft: 2017: 6th round, 48th overall pick

Career history
- 2017: Montreal Alouettes*
- 2017–2019: Saskatchewan Roughriders
- 2020: Toronto Argonauts*
- * Offseason or practice squad member only
- Stats at CFL.ca

Denzel Radford (born May 28, 1994) is a Canadian former professional football defensive back who played in the Canadian Football League (CFL). He played U Sports football for the Calgary Dinos as a receiver, defensive back, and kick returner from 2013 to 2016.

== Professional career ==
=== Montreal Alouettes ===
Radford was drafted by the Montreal Alouettes in the sixth round, 48th overall, in the 2017 CFL draft as a wide receiver and signed with the club on May 17, 2017. He participated in the team's 2017 training camp, and was converted to a defensive back, but did not play in any pre-season games.

=== Saskatchewan Roughriders ===
On June 7, 2017, the Alouettes traded Radford to the Saskatchewan Roughriders in exchange for offensive lineman, Matt Vonk. He made his professional debut on June 22, 2017, against his former team, the Alouettes. He played in all 18 regular season games and recorded two defensive tackles and 24 special teams tackles, finishing fourth in the CFL in special teams tackles in 2017.

The following two seasons saw Radford beset by injuries. In the 2018 season opener, he endured a torn labrum injury and was on the injured list for the remainder of the year. In 2019, he played in the first four games of the season, but suffered a knee injury and did not play until the last two regular season games of the season. He also played in the West Final against the Winnipeg Blue Bombers. He completed his three-year rookie contract, having played in 25 regular season games, tallying two defensive tackles and 28 special teams tackles.

=== Toronto Argonauts ===
Upon entering free agency, he signed with the Toronto Argonauts on February 12, 2020. The 2020 CFL season was later cancelled due to the COVID-19 pandemic.

== Personal life ==
Radford was born to parents Jennifer Radford and Don Bruno, who named him after American actor, Denzel Washington. He has a brother. He has completed two undergraduate degrees from the University of Calgary in Finance and Economics.
