= Connor McGough =

Canadian football player (born 1995)

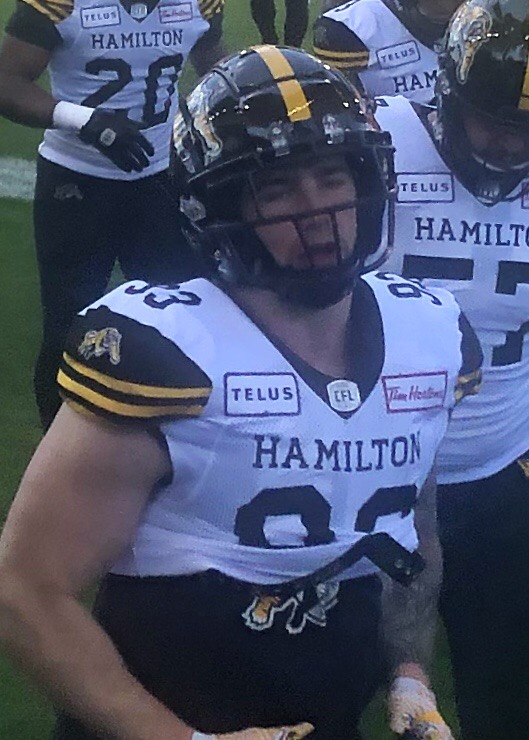
- McGough with the Hamilton Tiger-Cats in 2019

Profile
- Position: Defensive lineman

Personal information
- Born: August 14, 1995 (age 31); Medicine Hat, Alberta, Canada
- Listed height: 6 ft 1 in (1.85 m)
- Listed weight: 250 lb (113 kg)

Career information
- High school: Crescent Heights
- University: Calgary
- CFL draft: 2017: 1st round, 4th overall pick

Career history
- 2017–2019: Hamilton Tiger-Cats
- 2020–2022: Calgary Stampeders*
- * Offseason or practice squad member only

Awards and highlights
- Second-team All-Canadian (2014)
- Stats at CFL.ca

Connor Adam McGough (born August 14, 1995) is a Canadian former professional football defensive lineman who played for the Hamilton Tiger-Cats and Calgary Stampeders in the Canadian Football League (CFL). He played U Sports football at the University of Calgary. McGough was selected fourth overall in the 2017 CFL draft.

== University career ==
McGough played U Sports football for the Calgary Dinos from 2013 to 2016. He was named a CIS Second Team All-Canadian in 2014 and was a member of Hardy Cup championship teams in 2013 and 2016.

== Professional career ==
Pre-draft measurables
| Height | Weight | 40-yard dash | 20-yard shuttle | Three-cone drill | Vertical jump | Broad jump | Bench press |
|---|---|---|---|---|---|---|---|
| 6 ft 0 3/4 in (1.85 m) | 247 lb (112 kg) | 4.74 s | 4.25 s | 7.14 s | 32.5 in (0.83 m) | 9 ft 3 in (2.82 m) | 23 reps |
All values from CFL Combine

=== Hamilton Tiger-Cats ===
McGough was drafted by the Hamilton Tiger-Cats in the first round, fourth overall, in the 2017 CFL draft and signed with the team on May 24, 2017. He played in 51 games over three years with the Tiger-Cats where he recorded 14 defensive tackles, 33 special teams tackles, one sack, and two forced fumbles. He became a free agent upon the expiry of his contract on February 11, 2020.

=== Calgary Stampeders ===
On the first day of free agency, on February 11, 2020, McGough signed with the Calgary Stampeders. However, the 2020 CFL season was cancelled and he did not play in 2020. He then retired just prior to the 2021 season for health reasons and did not play in 2021. He re-signed with the Stampeders on February 24, 2022. However, he was once again decided to retire in May 2022 due to myocarditis which had caused him to miss the 2021 season.
