= 2017 CFL draft =

Canadian football draft

2017 CFL Draft

General information
- Sport: Canadian football
- Date: May 7
- Time: 7:00 PM EDT
- Location: Toronto
- Network: TSN/RDS

Overview
- 71 total selections in 8 rounds
- First selection: Faith Ekakitie DL, Winnipeg Blue Bombers
- Most selections: BC Lions (9); Saskatchewan Roughriders (9)
- Fewest selections: Toronto Argonauts (6)
- U Sports selections: 56
- NCAA selections: 15

The 2017 CFL draft took place on Sunday May 7, 2017 at 7:00 PM ET on TSN and RDS. 71 players were chosen from among eligible players from Canadian universities, as well as Canadian players playing in the NCAA.

The draft was broadcast live on TSN for two hours and then subsequent coverage shifted to digital platforms on TSN.ca and TSN GO. The production was hosted by Farhan Lalji and featured the CFL on TSN panel which included Duane Forde, Chris Schultz, Dave Naylor, and Marshall Ferguson. Jim Lawson, the CFL's Chairman of the Board of Governors, announced the picks for the first two rounds at the TSN studios. This was announced following the resignation of current CFL Commissioner Jeffrey Orridge.

== Top prospects ==
Source: CFL Scouting Bureau rankings.

| Final Ranking | December Ranking | September Ranking | Player | Position | School | Hometown |
|---|---|---|---|---|---|---|
| 1 | 1 | 1 | Justin Senior | Offensive lineman | Mississippi State | Montreal, QC |
| 2 | 3 | 5 | Eli Ankou | Defensive lineman | UCLA | Ottawa, ON |
| 3 | 5 | 11 | Geoff Gray | Offensive lineman | Manitoba | Winnipeg, MB |
| 4 | 7 | 4 | Daniel Vandervoort | Wide receiver | McMaster | Barrie, ON |
| 5 | 11 | 14 | Faith Ekakitie | Defensive lineman | Iowa | Brampton, ON |
| 6 | 8 | 6 | Christophe Mulumba | Linebacker | Maine | Laval, QC |
| 7 | 2 | 10 | Antony Auclair | Tight end | Laval | Notre-Dame-des-Pins, QC |
| 8 | 10 | 15 | Mason Woods | Offensive lineman | Idaho | Port Coquitlam, BC |
| 9 | 12 | 8 | Nathaniel Behar | Wide receiver | Carleton | London, ON |
| 10 | 15 | - | Dariusz Bladek | Offensive lineman | Bethune–Cookman | Kissimmee, FL |
| 11 | 9 | 13 | Junior Luke | Defensive lineman | Montreal | Montreal, QC |
| 12 | 6 | 2 | Kwaku Boateng | Defensive lineman | Wilfrid Laurier | Milton, ON |
| 13 | 13 | 9 | Qadr Spooner | Offensive lineman | McGill | Brossard, QC |
| 14 | 17 | 12 | Robert Woodson | Defensive back | Calgary | Calgary, AB |
| 15 | 19 | 17 | Kay Okafor | Defensive lineman | St. Francis Xavier | Enugu, Nigeria |
| 16 | - | - | Braden Schram | Offensive lineman | Calgary | Manning, AB |
| 17 | - | - | Johnny Augustine | Running back | Guelph | Welland, ON |
| 18 | - | - | Fabion Foote | Defensive lineman | McMaster | North York, ON |
| 19 | - | - | Dondre Wright | Defensive back | Henderson State | Ajax, ON |
| 20 | - | - | Connor McGough | Defensive lineman | Calgary | Medicine Hat, AB |
| - | 14 | 18 | Jean-Simon Roy | Offensive lineman | Laval | Quebec, QC |
| - | 16 | - | Jordan Herdman | Linebacker | Simon Fraser | Winnipeg, MB |
| - | 18 | 16 | Nakas Onyeka | Linebacker | Wilfrid Laurier | Brampton, ON |
| - | 20 | - | Mitchell Picton | Wide receiver | Regina | Regina, SK |
| - | 4 | 7 | Rashaun Simonise | Wide receiver | Calgary | Vancouver, BC |
| - | - | 3 | Akeel Lynch | Running back | Nevada | Toronto, ON |
| - | - | 19 | Kwabena Asare | Offensive lineman | Carleton | Brampton, ON |
| - | - | 20 | Corey Williams | Linebacker | Toronto | Toronto, ON |

== Trades ==
In the explanations below, (D) denotes trades that took place during the draft, while (PD) indicates trades completed pre-draft.

=== Round one ===
- Montreal → BC (PD). Montreal traded this selection to BC for the negotiating rights to Vernon Adams.
- Toronto → Winnipeg (PD). Toronto traded this selection, T. J. Heath, and a third-round pick in the 2018 CFL draft to Winnipeg for Drew Willy.
- Winnipeg ←→ Calgary (D). Winnipeg traded the sixth overall selection to Calgary for the eighth overall selection and the 34th overall selection in this year's draft.

=== Round two ===
- None

=== Round three ===
- None

=== Round four ===
- Saskatchewan → Calgary (PD). Saskatchewan traded this selection to Calgary for Tevaughn Campbell.
- Winnipeg → Montreal (PD). Winnipeg traded this selection to Montreal for Kevin Glenn.
- Hamilton → Saskatchewan (PD). Hamilton traded this selection, Linden Gaydosh, Tommy Streeter, and a seventh-round pick in this year's draft to Saskatchewan for Justin Capicciotti and Xavier Fulton.
- Montreal → Saskatchewan (PD). Montreal traded this selection and a conditional second-round pick in the 2018 CFL draft to Saskatchewan for Darian Durant.
- Calgary → Winnipeg (D). Calgary traded the 34th overall selection and the eighth overall selection to Winnipeg for the sixth overall selection in this year's draft.

=== Round five ===
- Montreal → Hamilton (PD). Montreal traded this selection, Khalid Wooten, and a sixth-round pick in this year's draft to Hamilton for Cierre Wood, Denzell Perine, a fifth-round pick in this year's draft, and a sixth-round pick in this year's draft.
- Hamilton → Montreal (PD). Hamilton traded this selection, Cierre Wood, Denzell Perine, and a sixth-round pick in this year's draft to Montreal for Khalid Wooten, a fifth-round pick in this year's draft, and a sixth-round pick in this year's draft.
- Winnipeg → Edmonton (PD). Winnipeg traded a conditional seventh-round selection to Edmonton for Matt Nichols. This later became a fifth-round selection after Nichols became Winnipeg's starting quarterback.

=== Round six ===
- Toronto → Montreal (PD). Toronto traded this selection and a conditional pick in the 2018 CFL draft to Montreal for S. J. Green.
- Montreal → Hamilton (PD). Montreal traded this selection, Khalid Wooten, and a fifth-round pick in this year's draft to Hamilton for Cierre Wood, Denzell Perine, a fifth-round pick in this year's draft, and a sixth-round pick in this year's draft.
- Hamilton → Montreal (PD). Hamilton traded this selection, Cierre Wood, Denzell Perine, and a fifth-round pick in this year's draft to Montreal for Khalid Wooten, a fifth-round pick in this year's draft, and a sixth-round pick in this year's draft.

=== Round seven ===
- Hamilton → Saskatchewan (PD). Hamilton traded this selection, Linden Gaydosh, Tommy Streeter, and a fourth-round pick in this year's draft to Saskatchewan for Justin Capicciotti and Xavier Fulton.
- Edmonton → Hamilton (PD). Edmonton traded a conditional seventh-round selection to Hamilton for Brian Simmons. The draft pick was solidified after the condition was met.

=== Round eight ===
- None

=== Conditional trades ===
- Winnipeg → Hamilton (PD). Winnipeg traded a conditional selection to Hamilton for the negotiation list rights to Tajh Boyd. The condition was not met and Winnipeg did not transfer their selection to Hamilton.

== Forfeitures ==
- Saskatchewan forfeits their third-round selection after selecting Kevin Francis in the 2016 Supplemental Draft.

== Draft order ==
=== Round one ===
| Pick # | CFL team | Player | Position | School |
|---|---|---|---|---|
| 1 | Winnipeg Blue Bombers (via Toronto) | Faith Ekakitie | DL | Iowa |
| 2 | Saskatchewan Roughriders | Cameron Judge | LB | UCLA |
| 3 | BC Lions (via Montreal) | Daniel Vandervoort | WR | McMaster |
| 4 | Hamilton Tiger-Cats | Connor McGough | DL | Calgary |
| 5 | Edmonton Eskimos | Nathaniel Behar | WR | Carleton |
| 6 | Calgary Stampeders (via Winnipeg) | Randy Colling | DL | Gannon |
| 7 | BC Lions | Junior Luke | DL | Montreal |
| 8 | Winnipeg Blue Bombers (via Calgary) | Geoff Gray | OL | Manitoba |
| 9 | Ottawa Redblacks | Evan Johnson | OL | Saskatchewan |

=== Round two ===
| Pick # | CFL team | Player | Position | School |
|---|---|---|---|---|
| 10 | Toronto Argonauts | Mason Woods | OL | Idaho |
| 11 | Saskatchewan Roughriders | Dariusz Bladek | OL | Bethune–Cookman |
| 12 | Montreal Alouettes | Fabion Foote | DT | McMaster |
| 13 | Hamilton Tiger-Cats | Braden Schram | OL | Calgary |
| 14 | Edmonton Eskimos | Jean-Simon Roy | OL | Laval |
| 15 | Winnipeg Blue Bombers | Qadr Spooner | OL | McGill |
| 16 | BC Lions | Jeremy Zver | OL | Regina |
| 17 | Calgary Stampeders | Julan Lynch | WR | Saskatchewan |
| 18 | Ottawa Redblacks | Anthony Gosselin | FB | Sherbrooke |

=== Round three ===
| Pick # | CFL team | Player | Position | School |
|---|---|---|---|---|
| 19 | Toronto Argonauts | Evan Foster | DL | Manitoba |
| – | Saskatchewan Roughriders | Forfeit pick | | |
| 20 | Montreal Alouettes | Dondre Wright | DB | Henderson State |
| 21 | Hamilton Tiger-Cats | Kay Okafor | DL | St. Francis Xavier |
| 22 | Edmonton Eskimos | Chris Mulumba | LB | Maine |
| 23 | Winnipeg Blue Bombers | Abubakar Conteh | DB | Grambling State |
| 24 | BC Lions | Frederic Chagnon | LB | Montreal |
| 25 | Calgary Stampeders | Tunde Adeleke | DB | Carleton |
| 26 | Ottawa Redblacks | Eli Ankou | DL | UCLA |

=== Round four ===
| Pick # | CFL team | Player | Position | School |
|---|---|---|---|---|
| 27 | Toronto Argonauts | Robert Woodson | DB | Calgary |
| 28 | Calgary Stampeders (via Saskatchewan) | Ante Milanovic-Litre | RB | Simon Fraser |
| 29 | Montreal Alouettes | Alexander Morrison | WR | British Columbia |
| 30 | Saskatchewan Roughriders (via Hamilton) | Antony Auclair | TE | Laval |
| 31 | Edmonton Eskimos | Jordan Hoover | DB | Waterloo |
| 32 | Saskatchewan Roughriders (via Montreal via Winnipeg) | Eddie Meredith | OL | Western |
| 33 | BC Lions | Nate Hamlin | DB | Carleton |
| 34 | Winnipeg Blue Bombers (via Calgary) | Felix Menard-Briere | K | Montreal |
| 35 | Ottawa Redblacks | Louis-Philippe Bourassa | RB | Montreal |

=== Round five ===
| Pick # | CFL team | Player | Position | School |
|---|---|---|---|---|
| 36 | Toronto Argonauts | Nakas Onyeka | LB | Wilfrid Laurier |
| 37 | Saskatchewan Roughriders | Mitchell Picton | WR | Regina |
| 38 | Hamilton Tiger-Cats (via Montreal) | Justin Vaughn | DL | Fordham |
| 39 | Montreal Alouettes (via Hamilton) | Zach Annen | OL | Carleton |
| 40 | Edmonton Eskimos | Justin Senior | OL | Mississippi State |
| 41 | Edmonton Eskimos (via Winnipeg) | Kwaku Boateng | DL | Wilfid Laurier |
| 42 | BC Lions | Edward Godin | DL | Laval |
| 43 | Calgary Stampeders | Felix Gacusana Jr. | OL | Simon Fraser |
| 44 | Ottawa Redblacks | Mathieu Dupuis | DL | Montreal |

=== Round six ===
| Pick # | CFL team | Player | Position | School |
|---|---|---|---|---|
| 45 | Montreal Alouettes (via Toronto) | Malcolm Carter | WR | Carleton |
| 46 | Saskatchewan Roughriders | Danny Sprukulis | OL | Toronto |
| 47 | Hamilton Tiger-Cats (via Montreal) | Jacob Scarfone | WR | Guelph |
| 48 | Montreal Alouettes (via Hamilton) | Denzel Radford | WR | Calgary |
| 49 | Edmonton Eskimos | Kwabena Asare | OL | Carleton |
| 50 | Winnipeg Blue Bombers | Ian Marouf | DL | Guelph |
| 51 | BC Lions | Dakota Brush | WR | Mount Allison |
| 52 | Calgary Stampeders | Alexandre Gagnon | DL | Sherbrooke |
| 53 | Ottawa Redblacks | Austen Hartley | WR | Calgary |

=== Round seven ===
| Pick # | CFL team | Player | Position | School |
|---|---|---|---|---|
| 54 | Toronto Argonauts | Justin Herdman | LB | Simon Fraser |
| 55 | Saskatchewan Roughriders | Alexandre Chevrier | LB | Sherbrooke |
| 56 | Montreal Alouettes | Ty Cranston | DB | Ottawa |
| 57 | Saskatchewan Roughriders (via Hamilton) | Emmanuel Adusei | DT | Carleton |
| 58 | Hamilton Tiger-Cats (via Edmonton) | Brett Golding | OL | Wilfrid Laurier |
| 59 | Winnipeg Blue Bombers | Brendon Thera-Plamondon | WR | Calgary |
| 60 | BC Lions | Jordan Herdman | LB | Simon Fraser |
| 61 | Calgary Stampeders | Adam Laurensse | DB | Calgary |
| 62 | Ottawa Redblacks | Ed Ilnicki | RB | Alberta |

=== Round eight ===
| Pick # | CFL team | Player | Position | School |
|---|---|---|---|---|
| 63 | Toronto Argonauts | Matthew Carson | DL | Calgary |
| 64 | Saskatchewan Roughriders | Marc Claudé | OL | Montreal |
| 65 | Montreal Alouettes | Oumar Toure | TE | Sherbrooke |
| 66 | Hamilton Tiger-Cats | Sean Thomas-Erlington | RB | Montreal |
| 67 | Edmonton Eskimos | Mark Mackie | DL | McMaster |
| 68 | Winnipeg Blue Bombers | Tylor Henry | WR | Alberta |
| 69 | BC Lions | Mitchell Hillis | WR | Saskatchewan |
| 70 | Calgary Stampeders | Richard Sindani | WR | Regina |
| 71 | Ottawa Redblacks | Jordan Filippelli | OL | Calgary |
