= Tight end =

Position in American and Canadian football

Example of tight end positioning in an offensive formation

The tight end (TE) is an offensive position in American football, arena football, and Canadian football. It is a hybrid that combines the characteristics and roles of both an offensive lineman and a receiver. As part of the receiver corps, they play inside the flanks (tight), contrasted with the split end who plays outside the flanks (wide). Like offensive linemen, they are usually lined up on the offensive line and are large enough to be effective blockers. On the other hand, unlike offensive linemen, they are eligible receivers and potent weapons in a team's offensive schemes.

The tight end's role in any given offense depends on the preferences and philosophy of the head coach, offensive coordinator, and overall team dynamic. In some systems, the tight end will merely act as a sixth offensive lineman, rarely going out for passes. Other systems use the tight end primarily as a receiver, frequently taking advantage of the tight end's size to create mismatches in the defensive secondary. Many coaches will often have one tight end who specializes in blocking on running plays while using a tight end with better pass-catching skills in passing situations.

Offensive formations may have as few as zero or as many as three tight ends at one time.

NFL tight ends in 2024 make an average of $8 million per year; some of the top tight ends make around $17 million per year. This position is amongst the lowest paid in the NFL.

== History ==
=== Origins ===
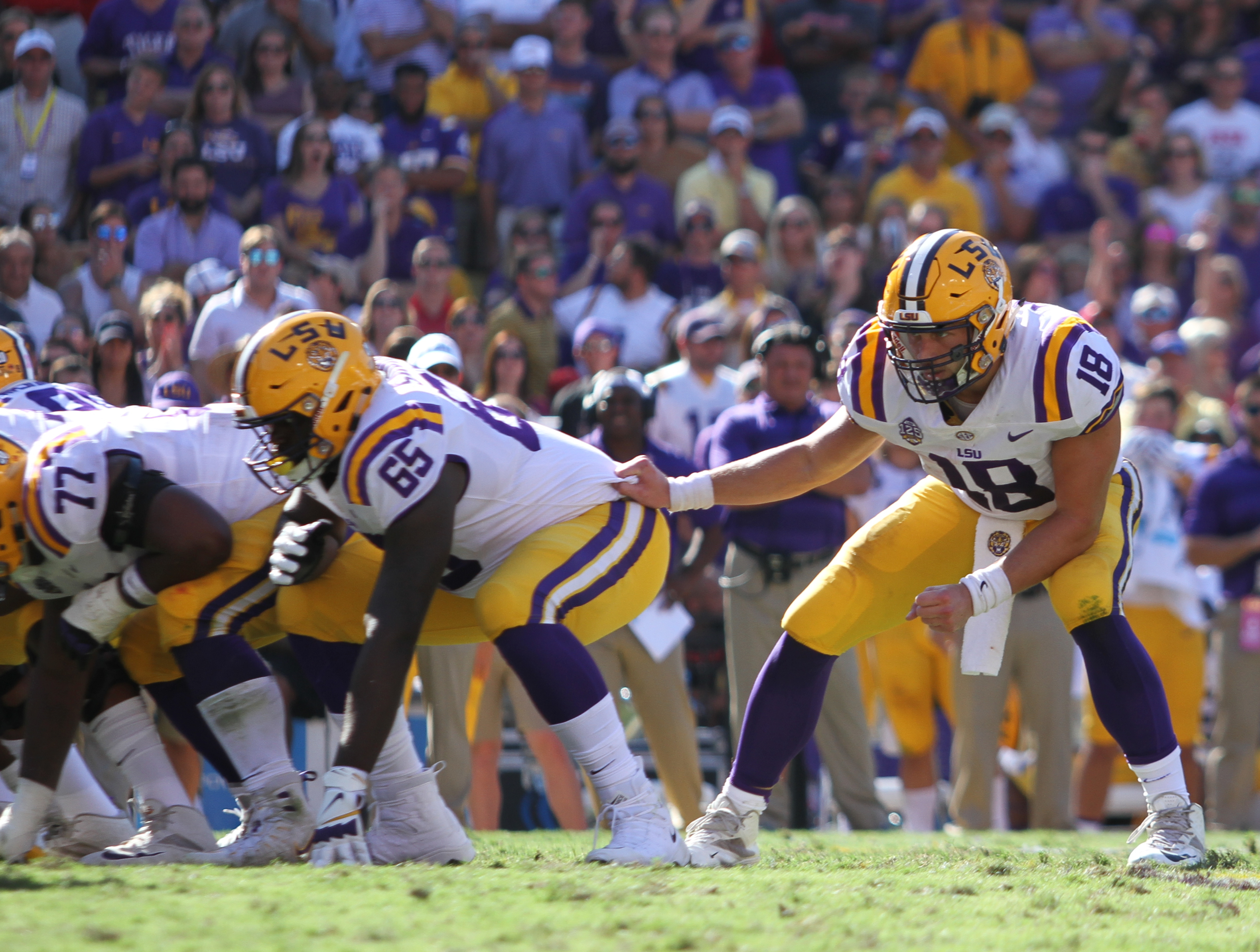
LSU Tigers tight end Foster Moreau (right) lining up on the end of the offensive line before a snap during a game in 2018

The advent of the tight end position is closely tied to the decline of the one-platoon system during the 1940s and '50s. Originally, substitutions were limited by rule, forcing players to be adept on both sides of the ball, with most offensive linemen doubling as defensive linemen or linebackers, and running backs and receivers doubling as defensive backs.

With the relaxation of substitution rules in professional football from the 1940s and after 1964 in the college game, a two-platoon system of offense and defense became the norm, with most players active on only one side of the ball. With the advent of the T-formation, double halfback sets quickly became a thing of the past, with a hybrid running back–receiver known as the "flanker back" positioned outside the halfback and fullback, "flanking" them. The receivers on each end of the line of scrimmage retained their historic name, "ends".

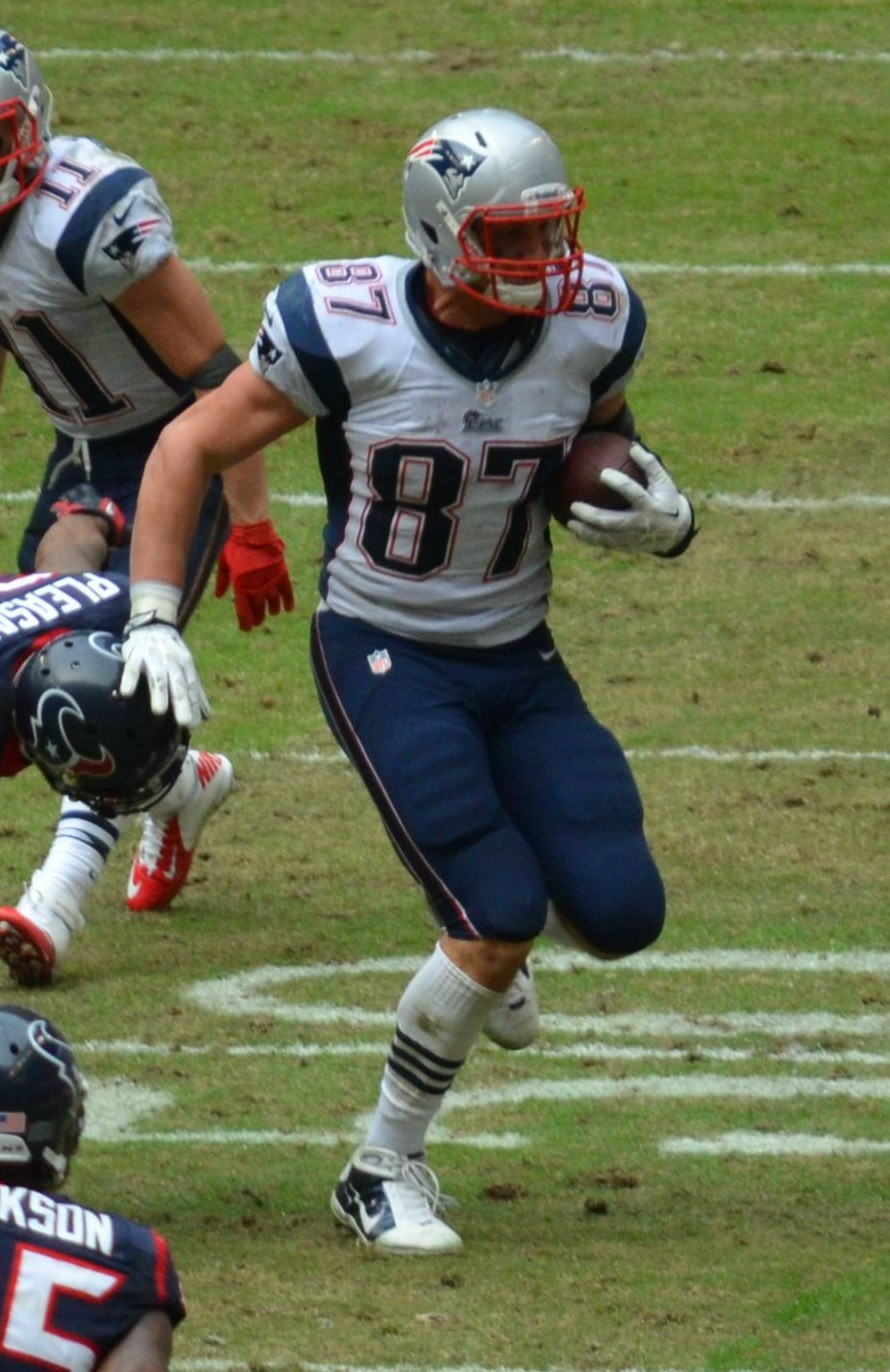
At 6'6" and 265 lbs., New England Patriots tight end Rob Gronkowski, a four-time first-team All-Pro, was large even by contemporary standards.

By the start of the 1960s many pro clubs had begun to position the flanker back far to the outside, just behind the line of scrimmage, part of what Washington Redskins coach Bill McPeak characterized as a "three ends" system. The receiver spread out on numerically inferior "weak" side of the formation was commonly known as the "split end"; the end lining up to the same side as the flanker, positioned close to the blocking linemen, became known as the "tight end". This tight end position, developed in the 1950s, embraced both blocking and receiving functions and flourished as part of the specialization of the two-platoon era.

Greater use of the tight end as a receiver in the cutting edge offenses of the 1960s led to the emergence of the first stars at the position, including Mike Ditka of the Chicago Bears, Jackie Smith of the St. Louis Cardinals, and John Mackey of the Baltimore Colts.

=== The modern position ===
Even with the emergence of star tight ends as receivers, the rush-heavy offenses of the 1960s through the early 1980s NFL saw tight ends continue to remain primarily blockers lined up next to an offensive tackle and given short to medium drag routes. Starting in 1980, the Air Coryell offense began using tight end Kellen Winslow in wide receiver-type routes. Winslow was lined up wide, in the slot against a smaller cornerback, or put in motion to avoid being jammed at the line. Defenses would cover him with either a strong safety or a linebacker, because zone defenses were less popular. Strong safeties in those times also were favored for their run defense over coverage speed. Providing them another defender to help cover Winslow opened up holes for other receivers. Winslow would line up unpredictably in any formation, variously in a three point blocking stance, two point receiver's stance, or put in motion like a flanker or offensive back. 2000s Head coach Jon Gruden referred to such multi-dimensional tight ends as "jokers", calling Winslow the first ever in the NFL. Patriots head coach Bill Belichick notes that the pass-catching tight ends that get paid the most are "all direct descendants of Kellen Winslow", and there are fewer tight ends now that can block on the line.

In the 1990s, Shannon Sharpe's athletic prowess as a route-runner helped change the way tight ends were used by teams. Consistently double-covered as a receiver, he became the first tight end in NFL history to rack up over 10,000 career receiving yards. Tony Gonzalez and Antonio Gates, who both played basketball in college, pushed the position toward wide receiver speed and power forward strength and wingspan. At 6'6" Rob Gronkowski brought height, setting single-season tight end records in 2011 with 17 touchdowns—breaking Gates's and Vernon Davis's record of 13—and 1,327 receiving yards, surpassing Winslow's record of 1,290. Jimmy Graham that season also passed Winslow with 1,310 yards. Six of the NFL's 15 players with the most receptions that year were tight ends, the most in NFL history. Previous seasons usually had at most one or two ranked in the top.

Tight ends generally hit their peak between the ages of 25 and 30.

=== Tight ends in other leagues ===
In the Arena Football League the tight end serves as the 3rd offensive lineman (along with the center and guard). Although they are eligible receivers they rarely go out for passes and are usually only used for screen passes when they do.

However, in Canadian football, tight ends are, in general, no longer used professionally in the CFL, but are still used at the college level in U Sports. Tony Gabriel is a former tight end in Canadian football. There remain some tight ends in use at university level football; Antony Auclair, formerly a tight end for the Laval Rouge et Or, was a contender to be selected in the 2017 CFL draft or possibly receive a tryout in the NFL. He was drafted by the CFL's Saskatchewan Roughriders in 2017, but instead signed with the NFL's Tampa Bay Buccaneers as an undrafted free agent that same year.

=== National Tight Ends Day ===
Since 2019, the NFL celebrates National Tight Ends Day on the fourth weekend of October to highlight tight ends in the league.

== Roles ==
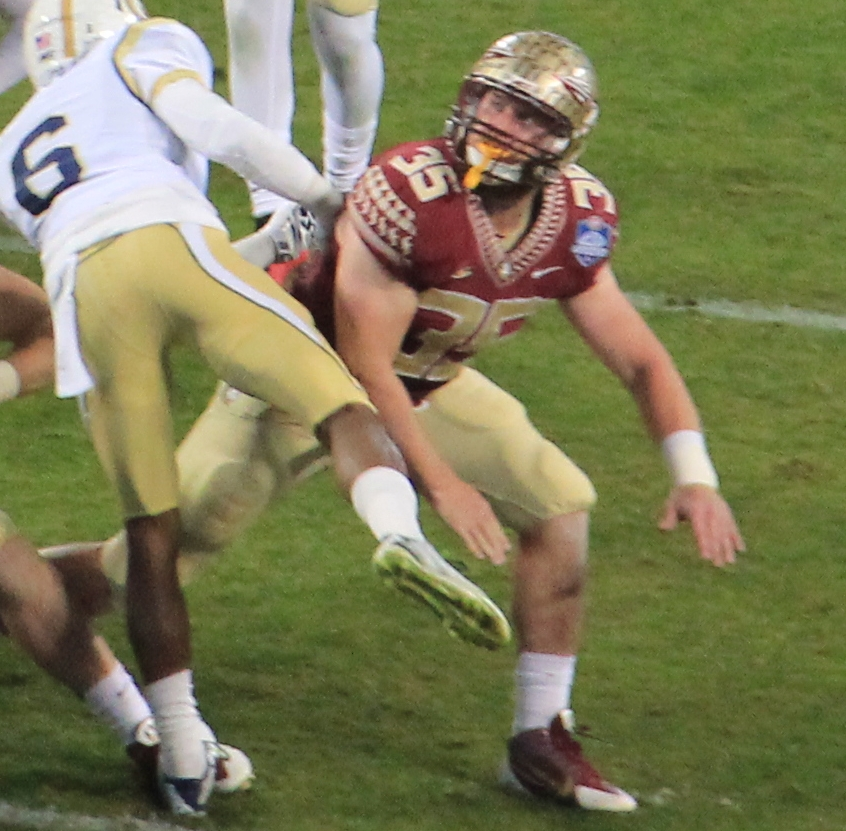
FSU tight end Nick O'Leary playing in-line as a blocker

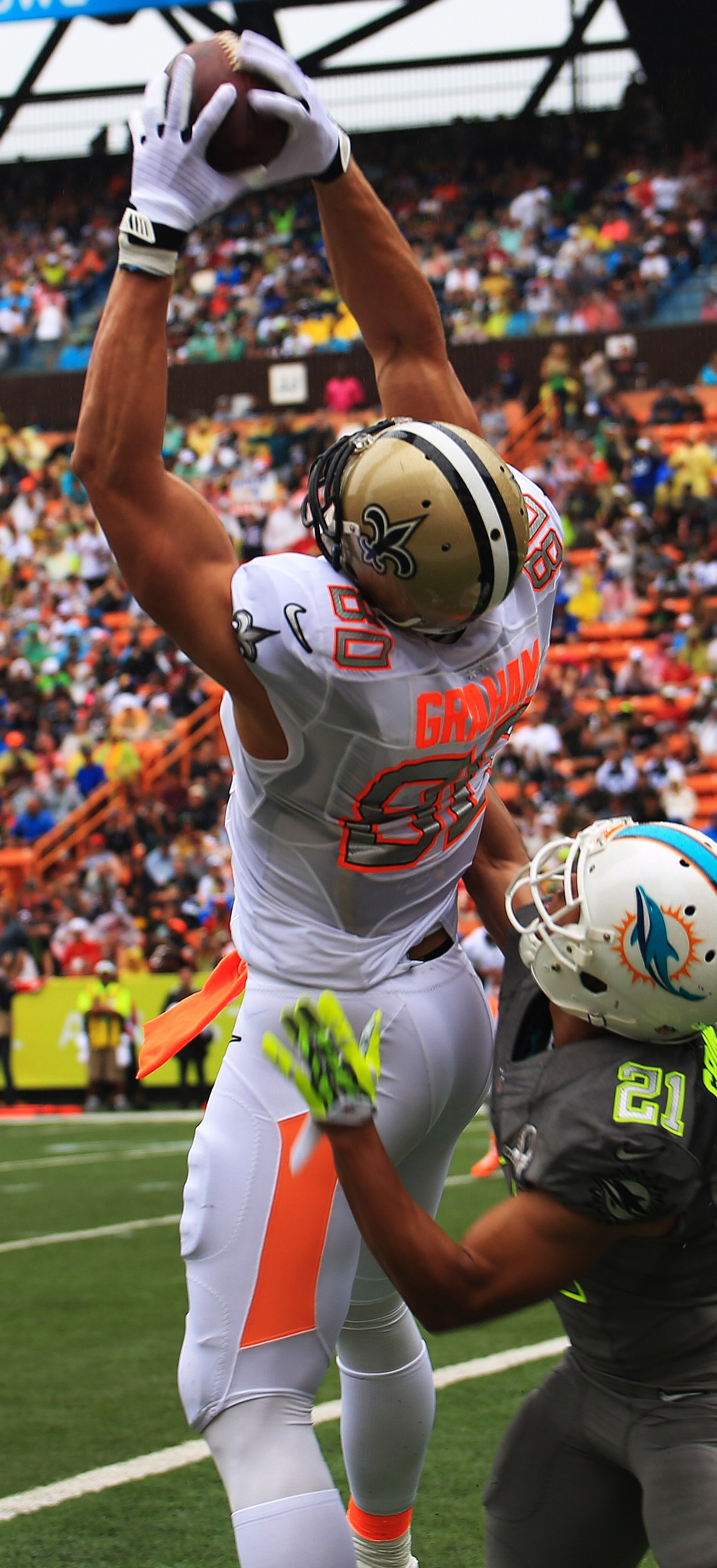
At 6'7", 265 lbs., Jimmy Graham, shown here playing in the Pro Bowl during his time with the New Orleans Saints, demonstrates the athleticism of a tight end in its role as a receiver.

Tight ends have two primary roles: (1) act as a blocker and (2) act as a receiver. Very occasionally, a tight end is also given the opportunity to rush with the ball. This typically happens when they are put in motion before the ball is snapped.

=== Blocking ===
In the National Football League (NFL), the tight end is larger, stronger, and slower than a wide receiver, and therefore able to block more effectively. Among offensive ball-handlers, it is the job of the tight end, along with the fullback, to block for both running backs and receivers. Tight ends are used as blockers to protect the quarterback during passing plays, to open holes in the line, and downfield to tie up linebackers and defensive backs.

Historically, a single tight end was used, typically placed on the right side of the offensive line. In the early 2000s, two tight end formations began to be used with more frequency. Specialty plays may deploy 3- or 4-tight-end sets in "heavy" or "jumbo" packages, usually to block in short-yardage situations or to sow confusion in the defensive backfield with such an unusual formation. When a blocker larger than a tight end is desired without sacrificing the player's ability to catch a pass the position is sometimes filled by an offensive lineman who reports to the referee that he is an eligible receiver, referred to colloquially as a "tackle eligible".

=== Receiving ===
Historically, the primary role of a tight end was blocking, with strategic use as a receiver. Over time the emphasis of offense has shifted from running to passing, and with it the role of the tight end as a receiver expanded. The tight end is usually faster than the linebackers who cover him and often stronger than the cornerbacks and safeties who try to tackle him. In general, there is an inherent trade-off between a tight end's speed and agility and their size, meaning more mobile tight ends tend not to be as effective as blockers. This results in great premiums being placed on tight ends who can fill both roles effectively. When a team cannot find both in a single player they often rotate between those who are stronger in one role better than the other depending on the type of skill required by given plays.

At the extreme end the receiving spectrum are 'hybrid' tight ends that are drafted primarily for their pass-catching abilities. Often, these players have near-wide receiver speed, coupled with greater overall size and strength. Plays utilizing their assets are designed to capitalize on their combination of size, speed, and wingspan, at times spreading them out on the line like wide-receivers, off the line in the slot, or putting them in motion in the backfield.

=== Rushing ===
The decline of the fullback as a rushing position has seen the occasional deployment of tight ends as ball carriers, either aligned in the backfield or out of the slot in a reverse or sweep.

== Physical attributes ==
Most tight ends are large in size, with an average height of 6 ft 4 in (1.93 m) and a weight exceeding 254 lb (115 kg). They are usually among the taller members of the team, comparable in height to many linemen. Tight ends need to have this combination of physical attributes because they can be called upon to block linebackers and defensive linemen, as well as run routes and catch passes from the quarterback while outrunning defensive backs. They are also among teams' heavier players, with only linemen and some linebackers weighing more than averaged-sized tight ends. Because of their larger size, tight ends are almost universally slower than wide receivers and running backs, although occasionally one with exceptional speed appears; an example of a tight end with a speed advantage—at the expense of blocking ability—is 6-foot-3-inch (1.91 m) 248-pound (112 kg) Vernon Davis, who achieved a 4.38 forty yard dash time.

== Jersey numbers ==
In American football, specific skill positions typically are issued jersey numbers in a restricted range. High school rules nationally are determined by the National Federation of State High School Associations; tight ends are able to wear any number other than 50–79. The NCAA "strongly recommends" ends wear 80–99, but this is not required. In the NFL, numbering has changed in 2021, which allows them to wear numbers 0-49 and 80–89. The 0–49 number range is a relatively recent addition to the rules; as a result, most tight ends still bear numbers in the 80–89 range.

== See also ==
- American football positions
