= Justin Vaughn =

Canadian football player (born 1994)

No. 92
- Position: Defensive lineman

Personal information
- Born: June 3, 1994 (age 32); Hamilton, Ontario, Canada
- Listed height: 6 ft 5 in (1.96 m)
- Listed weight: 287 lb (130 kg)

Career information
- College: Fordham
- CFL draft: 2017: 5th round, 38th overall pick

Career history
- 2017–2018: Hamilton Tiger-Cats

Awards and highlights
- First team All-Patriot League (2016)
- Stats at CFL.ca

Justin Vaughn (born June 3, 1994) is a Canadian former professional football defensive lineman who played in the Canadian Football League (CFL). He played college football at Fordham University.

== Professional career ==
Pre-draft measurables
Height	Weight	40-yard dash	Vertical jump	Broad jump
6 ft 5 1/8 in (1.96 m)	278 lb (126 kg)	5.10 s	28.0 in (0.71 m)	9 ft 4 in (2.84 m)
All values from CFL Combine

Vaughn was drafted in the fifth round, 38th overall by the Tiger-Cats in the 2017 CFL draft.

Vaughn appeared in all 18 games for the Tiger-Cats in his rookie season, recording 12 tackles and two sacks. In 2018, he appeared in six games in 2018 with three tackles before suffering a season ending injury. Vaughn was cut by the Tiger-Cats at the end of training camp for the 2019 season.

== Personal life ==
Vaughn's father, Mike, played running back for Tiger-Cats, appearing in one game during the 1989 season.
