= Jacob Scarfone =

Canadian football player (born 1994)

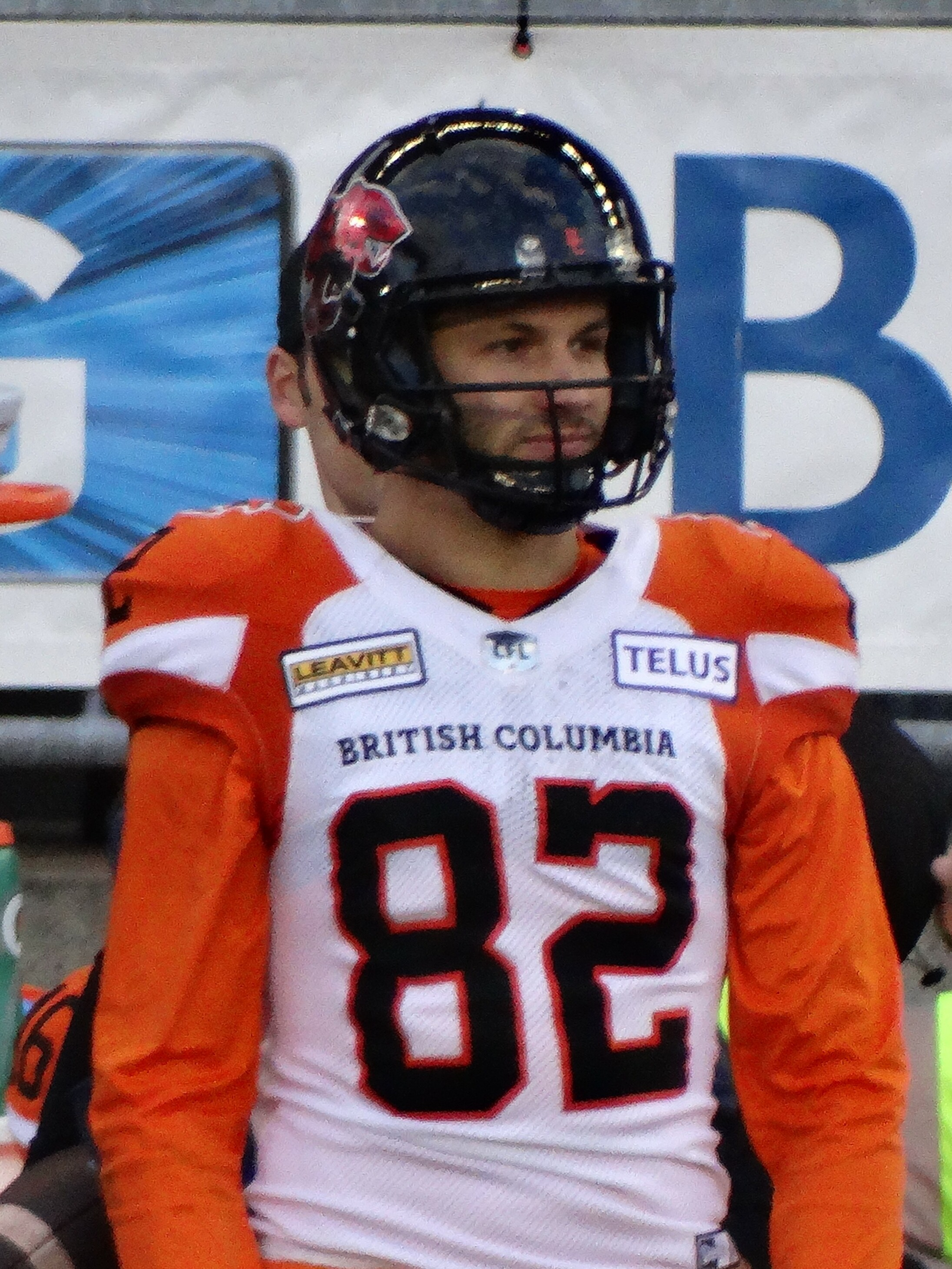
- Scarfone with the Lions in 2022

Profile
- Position: Wide receiver

Personal information
- Born: April 10, 1994 (age 32); London, Ontario
- Listed height: 6 ft 1 in (1.85 m)
- Listed weight: 204 lb (93 kg)

Career information
- High school: St. Thomas Aquinas
- University: Guelph
- CFL draft: 2017: 6th round, 47th overall pick

Career history
- 2017: Hamilton Tiger-Cats*
- 2018: Hamilton Tiger-Cats*
- 2018–2019: Ottawa Redblacks
- 2021–2022: BC Lions
- * Offseason or practice squad member only
- Stats at CFL.ca

Jacob Scarfone (born April 10, 1994) is a Canadian former professional football wide receiver.

== University career ==
Scarfone played U Sports football for the Guelph Gryphons from 2013 to 2017, although he missed the 2016 season due to injury. In four seasons with the Gryphons, he recorded 109 receptions for 1,789 yards and 17 touchdowns. He was named a U Sports Second Team All-Canadian in 2017.

== Professional career ==
=== Hamilton Tiger-Cats ===
Scarfone had missed his entire fourth year of U Sports eligibility in 2016, but was still drafted in the sixth round, 47th overall, by the Hamilton Tiger-Cats in the 2017 CFL draft and signed with the team on May 24, 2017. He began the season on the team's practice roster and was released on July 31, 2017, in order to complete his university playing career. On December 7, 2017, it was announced that he had re-signed with the Tiger-Cats to a two-year contract. However, he was released with the final 2018 training camp cuts on June 10, 2018.

=== Ottawa Redblacks ===
On July 3, 2018, Scarfone signed a practice roster agreement with the Ottawa Redblacks, but he was released shortly after on July 8, 2018. He was then re-signed on September 18, 2018, and played in his first career regular season game on October 5, 2018, against the Winnipeg Blue Bombers. He played in four regular season games that year and also played in his first Grey Cup game, but the Redblacks lost the 106th Grey Cup championship to the Calgary Stampeders.

Scarfone began the 2019 season on the injured list and played in a week 4 game against the Blue Bombers before moving to the practice roster. He returned to the active roster later in the season and recorded his first career reception on August 24, 2021, against the Saskatchewan Roughriders. He finished the year with seven games played and had three catches for 17 yards. He became a free agent on February 11, 2020, following the expiration of his contract, but did not sign with any team as the 2020 CFL season was ultimately cancelled.

=== BC Lions ===
On January 27, 2021, it was announced that Scarfone had signed with the BC Lions, re-uniting him with former Redblacks coach, Rick Campbell. He scored his first career touchdown on a 32-yard reception from Michael Reilly on October 30, 2021, against the Toronto Argonauts in overtime. On May 3, 2023, Scarfone retired from professional football.

=== Hobbies and post football career ===
In his spare time, Jacob enjoys playing softball, squash and volleyball with friends. Professionally, he was an analyst at Constellation Software, serving as chief of staff at their real estate division and reporting directly to Mark Leonard. In a LinkedIn post, former colleagues said he would be dearly missed.

Today, he is in the BD department of fast growing company Vena, where he helps companies automate and use AI.
