= Faith Ekakitie =

Canadian football player (born 1993)

No. 93
- Position: Defensive tackle

Personal information
- Born: April 25, 1993 (age 33); Brampton, Ontario, Canada
- Listed height: 6 ft 3 in (1.91 m)
- Listed weight: 290 lb (132 kg)

Career information
- College: Iowa
- CFL draft: 2017: 1st round, 1st overall pick

Career history
- 2017: Winnipeg Blue Bombers
- 2018: Montreal Alouettes
- Stats at CFL.ca

Faith Ekakitie (born April 25, 1993) is a Canadian former football defensive tackle. He was drafted first overall in the 2017 CFL draft by the Winnipeg Blue Bombers of the Canadian Football League (CFL). Ekakitie played college football for the Iowa Hawkeyes. He was also a member of the Montreal Alouettes.

== Professional career ==
Pre-draft measurables
| Height | Weight | Arm length | Hand span | 40-yard dash | 10-yard split | 20-yard split | 20-yard shuttle | Three-cone drill | Vertical jump | Broad jump | Bench press |
|---|---|---|---|---|---|---|---|---|---|---|---|
| 6 ft 1 1/8 in (1.86 m) | 304 lb (138 kg) | 33 5/8 in (0.85 m) | 9 3/4 in (0.25 m) | 5.05 s | 1.81 s | 3.04 s | 4.75 s | 7.68 s | 28.5 in (0.72 m) | 8 ft 5 in (2.57 m) | 24 reps |
All values from Pro Day

=== Winnipeg Blue Bombers ===
Ekakitie was drafted first overall in the 2017 CFL draft by the Blue Bombers and signed with the team on May 7, 2017 to a three-year contract. In his rookie season Ekakitie dressed for 14 regular-season games and contributed only five tackles. On June 10, 2018 Ekakitie was released by the Blue Bombers.

=== Montreal Alouettes ===
On June 14, 2018 Ekakitie signed with the Montreal Alouettes. Ekakitie suffered a torn Achilles during practice on June 26, 2018, causing him to miss the entire 2018 season. He was released by the Alouettes on January 28, 2019.

Following over a year of rehab on his Achilles, on July 15, 2019 Ekakitie announced his retirement from professional football.
