= Kay Okafor =

Nigerian gridiron football player (born 1993)

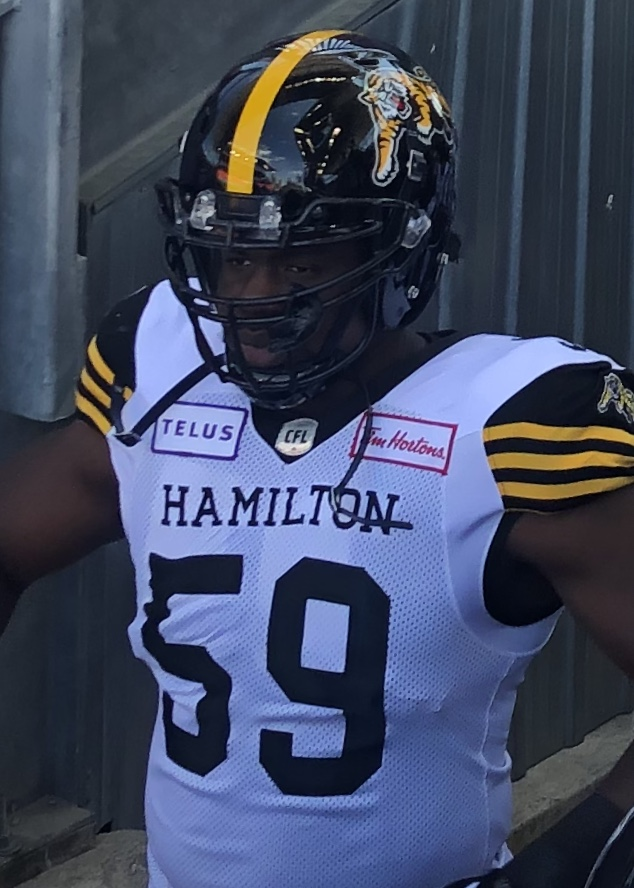
- Okafor with the Hamilton Tiger-Cats in 2019

Profile
- Position: Offensive lineman

Personal information
- Born: January 27, 1993 (age 33); Enugu, Nigeria
- Listed height: 6 ft 3 in (1.91 m)
- Listed weight: 281 lb (127 kg)

Career information
- AFL: Holland Hurricanes
- University: St. Francis Xavier
- CFL draft: 2017: 3rd round, 21st overall pick

Career history
- 2017–2022: Hamilton Tiger-Cats
- Stats at CFL.ca

Kaetochuku "Kay" Okafor (born January 27, 1993) is a Nigerian professional Canadian football offensive lineman. He was drafted in the third round, 21st overall, by the Hamilton Tiger-Cats in the 2017 CFL draft. He played college football for the St. Francis Xavier X-Men.

== Early life and university ==
Okafor was born and raised in Nigeria and moved to Prince Edward Island in 2011 and attended the University of Prince Edward Island there. His parents, three sisters, and brother lived in Nigeria while he attended university in Canada.

Okafor first played gridiron football for the Holland College Hurricanes of the Atlantic Football League in 2012 as a defensive lineman. He transferred to St. Francis Xavier University in 2013 to play for the X-Men football team. He played for four years with the team, appearing in 27 regular season games. He finished his AUS career as a member of the AUS championship team in 2016 while serving as a team captain.

== Professional career ==
Pre-draft measurables
Height	Weight	40-yard dash	20-yard shuttle	Three-cone drill	Vertical jump	Broad jump	Bench press
6 ft 3 in (1.91 m)	273 lb (124 kg)	4.94 s	4.68 s	7.66 s	32.5 in (0.83 m)	9 ft 2 1/2 in (2.81 m)	30 reps
All values from CFL Combine

In the final CFL Scouting Bureau Rankings, Okafor was listed as the 15th best prospect available in the 2017 CFL draft. This led to him being drafted 21st overall by the Hamilton Tiger-Cats and signing with the team on May 24, 2017. He played in both 2017 pre-season games for the Tiger-Cats and converted from the defensive line to the offensive line in training camp that year. He spent the 2017 season on the practice roster. In 2018, Okafor made the active roster out of training camp and dressed in his first professional game on June 16, 2018. He played in nine games in 2018 in a reserve role. Okafor played in all 18 regular season games in 2019 where he also had his first three career starts.

Okafor did not play in 2020 due to the cancellation of the 2020 CFL season. He became a regular starter for the team in 2021 and started the first eight regular season games, but did not play for the rest of the season due to injury. On February 14, 2023, Okafor became a free agent.
