= Dondre Wright =

Canadian football player (born 1994)

Profile
- Position: Defensive back

Personal information
- Born: April 7, 1994 (age 32); Ajax, Ontario, Canada
- Listed height: 5 ft 10 in (1.78 m)
- Listed weight: 210 lb (95 kg)

Career information
- High school: Pickering High
- College: Henderson State; New Mexico Military
- CFL draft: 2017: 3rd round, 20th overall pick

Career history
- 2017–2018: Montreal Alouettes
- 2019: Winnipeg Blue Bombers
- 2020: Toronto Argonauts*
- 2021: Montreal Alouettes*
- 2021: Toronto Argonauts*
- * Offseason or practice squad member only

Awards and highlights
- Grey Cup champion (2019)
- Stats at CFL.ca

Dondre Wright (born April 7, 1994) is a Canadian former professional football defensive back who played in the Canadian Football League (CFL).

== College career ==
Wright played college football for the New Mexico Military Institute Broncos and the Henderson State Reddies.

== Professional career ==
Pre-draft measurables
Height	Weight	40-yard dash	20-yard shuttle	Three-cone drill	Vertical jump	Broad jump	Bench press
5 ft 10 1/4 in (1.78 m)	199 lb (90 kg)	4.62 s	4.06 s	7.34 s	35.5 in (0.90 m)	9 ft 10 in (3.00 m)	11 reps
All values from CFL Combine

=== Montreal Alouettes (first stint) ===
Wright was drafted by the Montreal Alouettes in the third round, 20th overall, in the 2017 CFL draft and signed with the club on May 17, 2017. He made his professional debut on June 22, 2017 against the Saskatchewan Roughriders where he recorded two defensive tackles and two special teams tackles. He played in all 18 regular season games during the 2017 season where he finished with 45 defensive tackles, 12 special teams tackles, and one forced fumble. In 2018, he spent two stints on the injured list and only played in nine regular season games where he had just two special teams tackles. He was a full participant in the team's 2019 training camp, but was part of the Alouettes' final cuts on June 8, 2019.

=== Winnipeg Blue Bombers ===
On July 8, 2019, Wright was signed to a practice roster agreement by the Winnipeg Blue Bombers. He played in three regular season games of the Blue Bombers in 2019. He was on the practice roster when the team won the 107th Grey Cup.

=== Toronto Argonauts (first stint) ===
After becoming a free agent, he signed with the Toronto Argonauts on December 16, 2019. He did not play in 2020 due to the cancellation of the 2020 CFL season and was released by the Argonauts on December 15, 2020.

=== Montreal Alouettes (second stint) ===
On September 14, 2021, it was announced that Wright had re-signed with the Alouettes to a practice roster agreement. He spent a month on the practice roster before being released on October 17, 2021.

=== Toronto Argonauts (second stint) ===
On October 24, 2021, Wright re-signed with the Argonauts. However, after spending time on the practice roster, he was released on November 3, 2021.
