= Brian Simmons (Canadian football) =

American gridiron football player (born 1985)

No. 59
- Position: Offensive lineman

Personal information
- Born: March 16, 1985 (age 41); Raleigh, North Carolina, U.S.
- Listed height: 6 ft 5 in (1.96 m)
- Listed weight: 310 lb (141 kg)

Career information
- High school: Southeast Raleigh (NC)
- College: Oklahoma

Career history
- 2010: New England Patriots*
- 2011–2015: Hamilton Tiger-Cats
- 2015: Edmonton Eskimos
- 2016: Hamilton Tiger-Cats
- 2017: Montreal Alouettes
- * Offseason or practice squad member only

Awards and highlights
- Grey Cup champion (2015); CFL East All-Star (2014)
- Stats at CFL.ca

Brian Simmons (born March 16, 1985) is an American former professional football offensive tackle who played in the Canadian Football League (CFL). He was signed by the New England Patriots as an undrafted free agent in 2010. Following his release, he signed with the Hamilton Tiger-Cats on May 18, 2011. He played college football at Oklahoma.

Simmons was born in Charlotte NC. He and his mother moved to Raleigh NC in 1987.
