= Kristian Matte =

Canadian gridiron football player (born 1985)

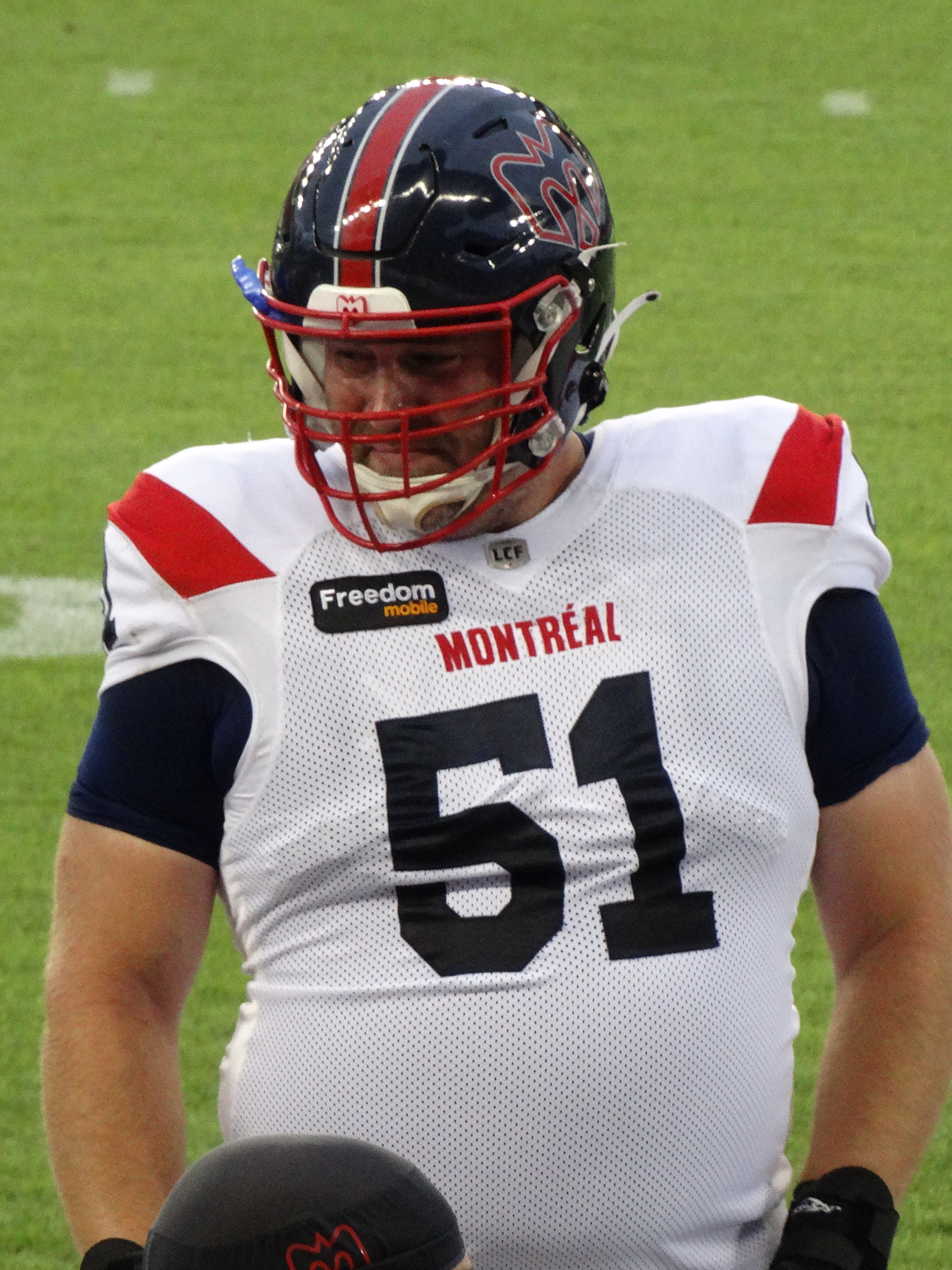
- Matte with the Montreal Alouettes in 2024

BC Lions
- Title: Running backs coach

Personal information
- Born: September 3, 1985 (age 41); Saint-Hubert, Quebec, Canada
- Listed height: 6 ft 4 in (1.93 m)
- Listed weight: 296 lb (134 kg)

Career information
- Position: Offensive lineman (No. 51)
- University: Concordia
- CFL draft: 2010: 1st round, 7th overall pick

Career history

Playing
- 2010: Houston Texans*
- 2010–2024: Montreal Alouettes
- * Offseason or practice squad member only

Coaching
- 2025–present: BC Lions (RB)

Awards and highlights
- 2× Grey Cup champion (2010, 2023); 2× CFL East All-Star (2019, 2021)
- Stats at CFL.ca (archive)

Kristian Matte (born September 3, 1985) is a Canadian former professional football offensive lineman and is currently the running backs coach for the BC Lions of the Canadian Football League (CFL). He was drafted seventh overall by the Montreal Alouettes in the 2010 CFL draft and played his entire 15-year career (2010–2024) with the team after attending mini camp with the NFL's Houston Texans.

== University career ==
Matte played CIS football for the Concordia Stingers.

== Professional career ==
=== Houston Texans ===
Matte signed with the NFL's Houston Texans on April 24, 2010, which was approximately one week before the CFL draft. Nonetheless, the Montreal Alouettes selected him with their seventh overall pick. Their gamble paid off as Matte was released by the Texans on June 16, 2010.

=== Montreal Alouettes ===
On July 14, 2010, it was announced that Matte had signed a contract with the Montreal Alouettes. He signed an extension with the team on December 18, 2020. On December 5, 2024, Matte announced his retirement.

== Coaching career ==
On February 26, 2025, Matte was announced as the running backs coach for the BC Lions.

== Acting career ==
In October 2003, Matte played Jason Voorhees in the viral internet short film comedy "Horror Friends" written and directed by his high school friend and former band mate, Jordan Crowder. Matte also had a brief cameo in Crowder's independent feature film "Bend & Break" billed as "Pool Hall Thug."

== Music career ==
Matte was the drummer of the Canadian Punk Band "Cadywoompus" in the early 2000's.
