= Paul LaPolice =

American gridiron football coach (born 1970)

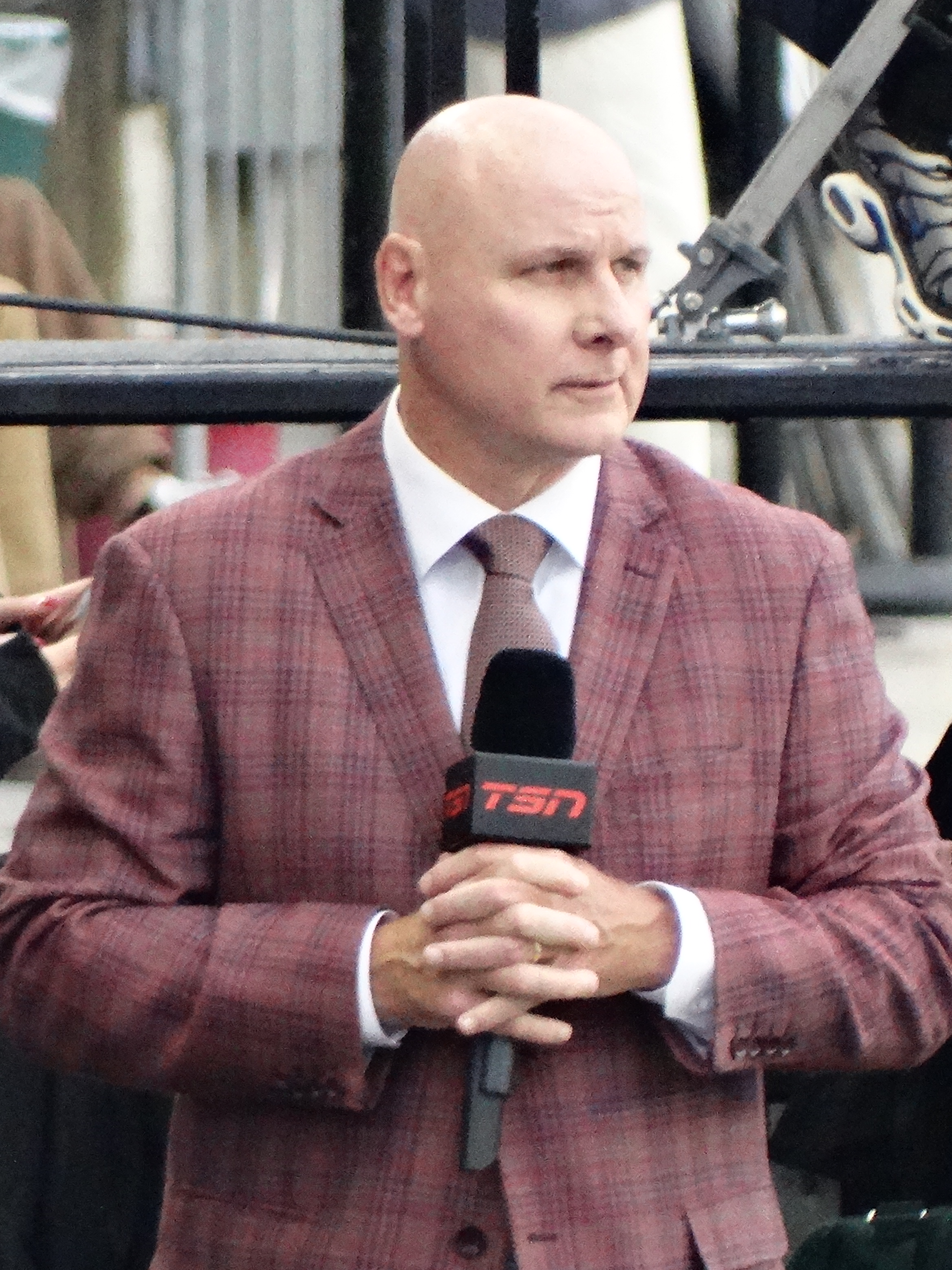
- LaPolice with TSN in 2024

Personal information
- Born: June 12, 1970 (age 56); Nashua, New Hampshire, U.S.

Career information
- College: Plymouth State College

Career history
- 2000–2001: Toronto Argonauts (Quarterbacks coach, receivers coach, running backs coach)
- 2002–2003: Winnipeg Blue Bombers (Offensive coordinator, receivers coach, running backs coach)
- 2004–2005: Hamilton Tiger-Cats (Receivers coach)
- 2006: Toronto Argonauts (Receivers coach)
- 2007: Saskatchewan Roughriders (Receivers coach)
- 2008–2009: Saskatchewan Roughriders (Offensive coordinator)
- 2010–2012: Winnipeg Blue Bombers (Head coach)
- 2016–2019: Winnipeg Blue Bombers (Offensive coordinator)
- 2020–2022: Ottawa Redblacks (Head coach)
- 2025–present: Canadian men's national flag football team (Head coach)

Awards and highlights
- 2× Grey Cup champion (2007, 2019)

Paul "LaPo" LaPolice (born June 12, 1970) is an American football coach who is the head coach of the Canadian men's national flag football team. He is also a broadcaster for TSN.

He has also served as the head coach for the Winnipeg Blue Bombers and Ottawa Redblacks of the Canadian Football League (CFL). He is a two-time Grey Cup champion as an assistant coach, with the Saskatchewan Roughriders in 2007 and with the Winnipeg Blue Bombers in 2019.

== Early life and education ==
LaPolice was born and raised in Nashua, New Hampshire. After graduating from Nashua High School, he attended Plymouth State College where he played as a wide receiver on the football team. LaPolice earned his Bachelor of Science degree in physical education in 1994.

== Coaching career ==
=== Early career ===
He broke into the coaching ranks in 1993 at Maine Maritime Academy where he served as the receivers and tight ends coach on a 9–1 team that won the NEFC and ECAC championship. The next year, he coached receivers at Western Connecticut State University. He left to become the receivers coach at the University of New Hampshire for the next two seasons (1995–1996). In 1997, he was named the quarterbacks and receivers coach at Rensselaer Polytechnic Institute. The following year, he was promoted to offensive coordinator where his offences broke 21 offensive school records in two seasons (1998–1999). In 1998, tailback Krishaun Gilmore was named UCAA and ECAC Player of the Year and a first team all American selection and finished second in the nation in rushing under LaPolice. The next year, quarterback Matt Robbens was also named UCAA and ECAC Player of the Year making the second in two years under LaPolice, as he led Rensselear to an undefeated regular season.

=== Canadian Football League ===
LaPolice entered the Canadian Football League in 2000 when Toronto Argonauts head coach John Huard hired him to become the team's Quarterbacks and receivers coach. He spent two years in this capacity until he joined the Winnipeg Blue Bombers and became their offensive coordinator, quarterbacks, receivers and running backs coach. The club set 14 offensive team records in 2002, including Khari Jones throwing for a team record 46 touchdowns and slotback Milt Stegall catching a league-record 23 touchdown passes and being named the CFL's Most Outstanding Player. The offence faltered with a struggling Khari Jones in 2003 and LaPolice was let go at the conclusion of the season.

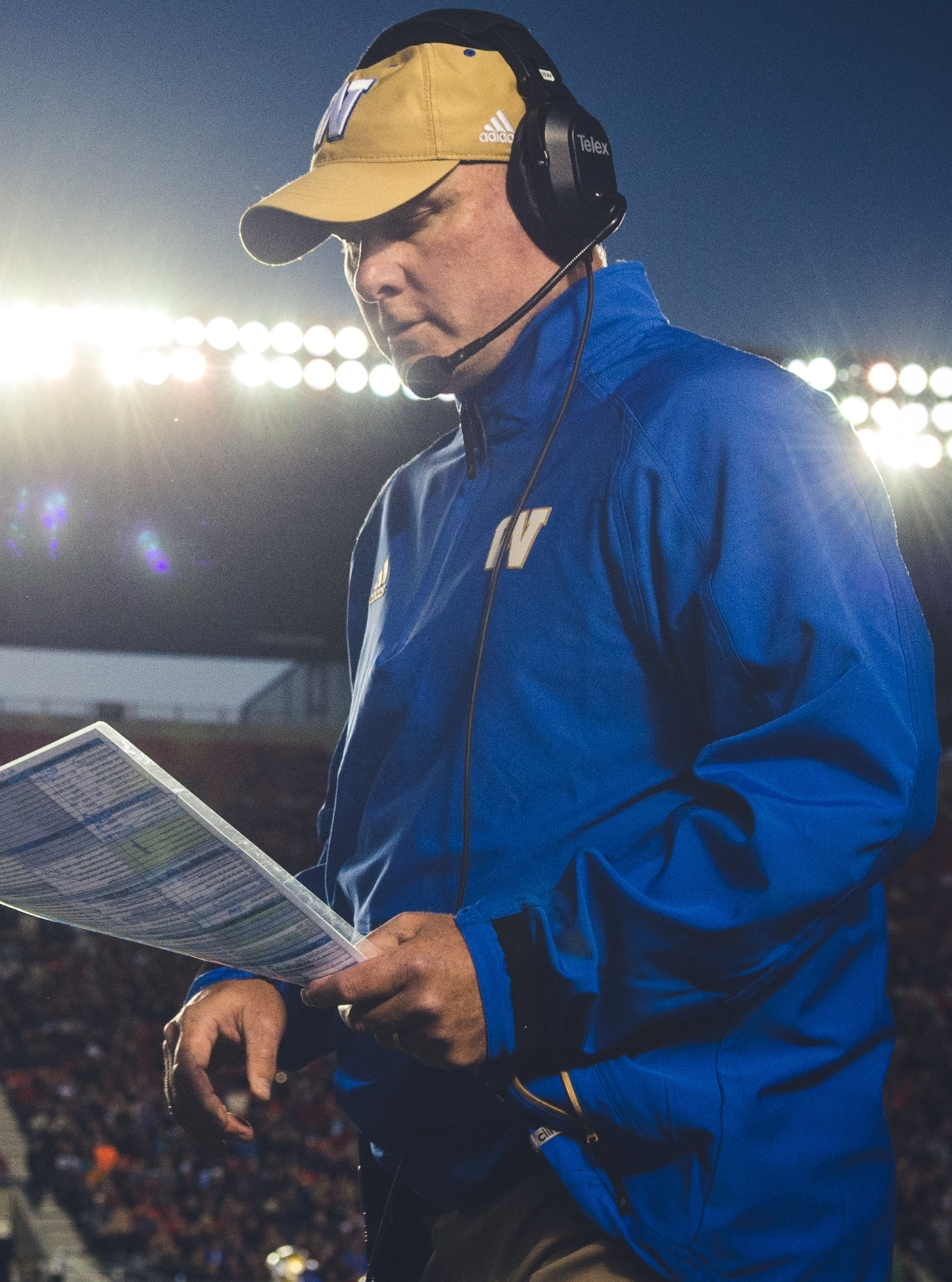
LaPolice in 2016 with the Winnipeg Blue Bombers.

In 2004 he joined the Hamilton Tiger-Cats as the team's receivers coach and stayed with the team for two years until rejoining the Toronto Argonauts, again, as the receivers coach. After former Argos' offensive coordinator Kent Austin was hired as head coach of the Saskatchewan Roughriders, LaPolice joined him as that team's receivers coach. After Austin left the team and Roughrider offensive coordinator Ken Miller was promoted to head coach, LaPolice was, in turn, promoted to offensive coordinator in 2008. The team finished 12–6 in 2008 and lost in the first round of the playoffs. In 2009, the Roughriders finished in first place in the West Division for the first time in 33 years, won the West final and lost in the Grey Cup final to the Montreal Alouettes on the last play. LaPolice's offence finished second in scoring and in touchdowns scored as he helped first year starting quarterback Darian Durant to a Western Division All Star nomination.

On February 5, 2010, LaPolice was hired as the 28th head coach of the Winnipeg Blue Bombers. His first season as head coach of the Blue Bombers saw the team win only four games and miss the playoffs while setting a CFL record for most losses by four points or less (nine times). The following year, the LaPolice helped to orchestrate one of the biggest turnarounds in CFL history as the Blue Bombers finished first place in their Division for the first time since 2001. The team also earned a berth in the Grey Cup, but lost to the BC Lions in the championship game. LaPolice was named a finalist for the CFL Coach of the Year in 2011 and given a contract extension during the offseason. However, after the club's poor start to the 2012 season, LaPolice was relieved of coaching duties by general manager Joe Mack midway through the season.

After three years as a broadcaster, LaPolice returned to coaching as he re-joined the Winnipeg Blue Bombers as their offensive coordinator, marking his third stint with the team. The Bombers led the CFL in points scored in 2017 and tailback Andrew Harris was named Most Outstanding Canadian in the CFL. The team again led the CFL in a number of offensive categories including Points scored, Offensive Points, TDs scored and rushing yards per game. In January 2019, the Roughriders requested to interview LaPolice for their vacant head coaching position, but the Bombers refused to grant them permission. LaPolice would go on to with the 107th Grey Cup with the Blue Bombers at the conclusion of the 2019 CFL season. The offence led the CFL in rushing again as well as finished 2nd in Scoring while playing three different QBs throughout the season.

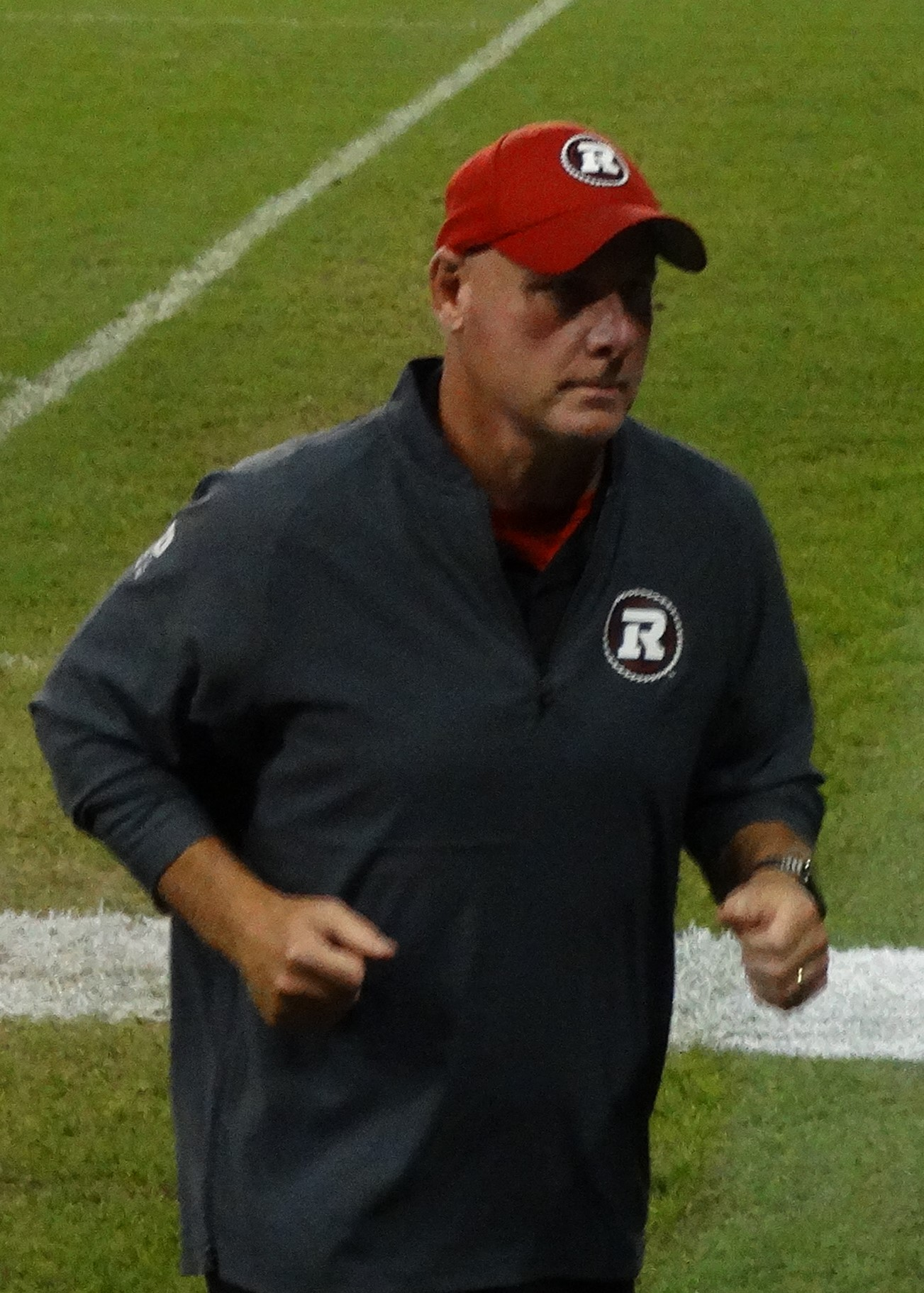
LaPolice with the Ottawa Redblacks in 2021.

On December 7, 2019, it was announced that LaPolice had agreed to a three-year contract to become the head coach of the Ottawa Redblacks. After the 2020 CFL season was cancelled, he led the Redblacks to back-to-back 3–11 records before his dismissal on October 1, 2022.

=== International ===
In May 2025, LaPolice was hired as the head coach of the Canadian men's national flag football team.

=== CFL coaching record ===
Team	Year	Regular season					Postseason		
Team	Year	Won	Lost	Ties	Win %	Finish	Won	Lost	Result
WPG	2010	4	14	0	.222	4th in East Division	–	–	Failed to Qualify
WPG	2011	10	8	0	.556	1st in East Division	1	1	Lost in Grey Cup
WPG	2012	2	6	0	.250	4th in East Division	–	–	Fired
OTT	2020	Season cancelled							
OTT	2021	3	11	0	.214	4th in East Division	–	–	Failed to Qualify
OTT	2022	3	11	0	.214	4th in East Division	–	–	Fired
Total		22	50	0	.306	1 Division; Championship	1	1	0 Grey Cups

== Broadcasting career ==
TSN brought LaPolice on board as a guest analyst for the 2012 playoffs. From 2013 to 2015, LaPolice worked full-time for the CFL on TSN, hosting a segment called the "Coach's Playbook" and appearing occasionally on the TSN panel. He returned to TSN in 2023, where he is an analyst on the panel in addition to colour commentary duties, including on the CFC Prospect Game.

== Personal life ==
LaPolice and his wife Tina have three children together. The family resides year-round in Ottawa, Ontario.
