= 2019 Montreal Alouettes season =

Canadian football team season

- General manager: Joe Mack (since July 14, 2019); Kavis Reed (fired July 14, 2019)
- Head coach: Khari Jones
- Home stadium: Percival Molson Memorial Stadium

Results
- Record: 10–8
- Division place: 2nd, East
- Playoffs: Lost East Semi-Final
- Team MOP: Vernon Adams Jr.
- Team MOC: Henoc Muamba
- Team MOR: Jake Wieneke

Uniform

The 2019 Montreal Alouettes season was the 53rd season for the team in the Canadian Football League (CFL) and their 65th overall. The Alouettes finished with a 10–8 record and qualified for the playoffs for the first time since 2014 following a week 17 win over the Calgary Stampeders on October 5, 2019. The club hosted a playoff game for the first time since 2014, having finished in second place in the East Division. However, they lost the game to the Edmonton Eskimos by a score of 37–29.

The team's head coach, Mike Sherman, abruptly departed June 8, 2019, after the team had played its first two preseason games. Khari Jones became the team's interim head coach and this was the third season under general manager, Kavis Reed. Shortly after their fourth game of the season, Reed was dismissed by the Alouettes on July 14, 2019 by team president and CEO Patrick Boivin. His position is being filled by Assistant General Manager of Player Personnel, Joe Mack, with other duties shared by Jones and Director of Football Operations, Patrick Donovan.

The Alouettes entered the 2019 CFL season with significantly different home and away uniforms for the first time since the 2000 season. The club also announced a change in stadium seating with gameday capacity at Percival Molson Memorial Stadium being "strategically lower(ed)" from 23,430 to 20,025 seats (the same capacity it had before the stadium was expanded to accommodate the CFL, which normally requires stadiums to have at least 24,000 seats) and average ticket prices being reduced from $84 to $75.

== Offseason ==
=== Banishment of Johnny Manziel ===
On February 27, 2019, Johnny Manziel, a quarterback for the Alouettes in 2018, was permanently banned from playing on any CFL team as a result of what the Alouettes called an unspecified "(contravention of) the agreement which made him eligible to play." Manziel denied any wrongdoing but accepted the banishment, stating he would consider playing options in the United States such as the Alliance of American Football or the XFL.

=== Bob Wetenhall relinquishes ownership ===
On May 31, 2019, Robert C. Wetenhall, the owner of the Alouettes for most of the time since the team relocated from Baltimore in the late 1990s, surrendered control of the Alouettes franchise to the Canadian Football League, which then attempted to sell the franchise to new owners. Two ownership groups publicly expressed interest in buying the team: Eric Lapointe, a former Alouettes running back; and Clifford Starke, a 35-year-old medical cannabis entrepreneur. Lapointe had previously made an offer to Wetenhall in 2017 but was rebuffed; acknowledging that Wetenhall was reluctant to sell the team to him. Lapointe withdrew his bid in April 2019. Vincent Guzzo met with the CFL in mid-May to submit a purchase bid.

=== Foreign drafts ===
For the first time in its history, the CFL held drafts for foreign players from Mexico and Europe. Like all other CFL teams, the Alouettes held three non-tradeable selections in the 2019 CFL–LFA draft, which took place on January 14, 2019. The 2019 European CFL draft took place on April 11, 2019 where all teams held one non-tradeable pick.

Draft	Round	Pick	Player	Position	School	Hometown
LFA	1	3	Enrique Yenny	K	ITESM–Toluca	Aguascalientes, Mexico
LFA	2	12	Diego Kuhlmann	OL	ITESM–Toluca	
LFA	3	21	Juan Márquez	CB	UDLAP	
Euro	1	3	Asnnel Robo	RB	Montreal	Cayenne, France

=== CFL draft ===
The 2019 CFL draft took place on May 2, 2019. The Alouettes selected second in each round of the draft by virtue of finishing second-last in the league standings. The club forfeited its first-round selection after selecting Tyler Johnstone in the 2018 Supplemental Draft. The team also traded away its second-round pick to Hamilton as part of the Ryan Bomben and Jamal Robinson trade. The Alouettes upgraded their scheduled third-round pick to a second-round pick by trading Tyrell Sutton to the BC Lions and acquired another second-round pick by trading Chris Ackie to the Ottawa Redblacks. The Alouettes re-acquired a third-round selection by trading Vernon Adams to the Saskatchewan Roughriders (who eventually re-joined the Alouettes as a free agent in 2018).

Round	Pick	Player	Position	School	Hometown
2	13	Kaion Julien-Grant	WR	St. Francis Xavier	Toronto, ON
2	16	Nate Anderson	DL	Missouri	Toronto, ON
2	19	Samuel Thomassin	OL	Laval	Québec, QC
3	21	Zach Wilkinson	OL	Northern Colorado	Vancouver, BC
4	30	Chris Osei-Kusi	WR	Queen's	Brampton, ON
5	39	Michael Sanelli	DT	Concordia	Toronto, ON
6	48	Jeshrun Antwi	RB	Calgary	Calgary, AB
7	57	Benjamin Whiting	LB	Saskatchewan	Saskatoon, SK
8	66	Cody Cranston	DB	Ottawa	Winnipeg, MB

== Preseason ==
=== Schedule ===
Week	Game	Date	Kickoff	Opponent	Results		TV	Venue	Attendance	Summary
Week	Game	Date	Kickoff	Opponent	Score	Record	TV	Venue	Attendance	Summary
A	Bye									
B	1	Thu, May 30	11:00 a.m. EDT	@ Toronto Argonauts	L 20–45	0–1	None	Varsity Stadium	4,313	Recap
C	2	Thu, June 6	7:30 p.m. EDT	Ottawa Redblacks	T 20–20	0–1–1	TSN/RDS	Molson Stadium	12,474	Recap

# Games played with white uniforms.

== Regular season ==
=== Standings ===
East Division
Team	GP	W	L	T	Pts	PF	PA	Div	Stk	
Hamilton Tiger-Cats	18	15	3	0	30	551	344	7–1	W6	Details
Montreal Alouettes	18	10	8	0	20	479	485	5–3	W1	Details
Toronto Argonauts	18	4	14	0	8	373	562	3–5	L1	Details
Ottawa Redblacks	18	3	15	0	6	312	564	1–7	L11	Details

=== Schedule ===
In the late evening of August 9 at 9:06 pm EDT, a weather delay was declared at Percival Molson Memorial Stadium due to an approaching thunderstorm with intense lightning; the Roughriders were leading the Alouettes 17–10 with 2:41 left in the 3rd quarter. Because the game had not restarted by 10:06 pm EDT and over 7:30 had been played in the 3rd quarter at that point, the 17–10 score was declared final.

In week 11, the Alouettes were the "away" team as they played the Toronto Argonauts in the fourth regular season installment of Touchdown Atlantic in Moncton, New Brunswick.

Week	Game	Date	Kickoff	Opponent	Results		TV	Venue	Attendance	Summary
Week	Game	Date	Kickoff	Opponent	Score	Record	TV	Venue	Attendance	Summary
1	1	Fri, June 14	9:00 p.m. EDT	@ Edmonton Eskimos	L 25–32	0–1	TSN/RDS/ESPN2	Commonwealth Stadium	25,263	Recap
2	Bye									
3	2	Fri, June 28	7:30 p.m. EDT	@ Hamilton Tiger-Cats	L 10–41	0–2	TSN/RDS/ESPN2	Tim Hortons Field	22,407	Recap
4	3	Thu, July 4	7:30 p.m. EDT	Hamilton Tiger-Cats	W 36–29	1–2	TSN/RDS	Molson Stadium	18,673	Recap
5	4	Sat, July 13	4:00 p.m. EDT	@ Ottawa Redblacks	W 36–19	2–2	TSN/RDS/ESPN2	TD Place Stadium	21,536	Recap
6	5	Sat, July 20	4:00 p.m. EDT	Edmonton Eskimos	W 20–10	3–2	TSN/RDS	Molson Stadium	16,137	Recap
7	Bye									
8	6	Fri, Aug 2	7:00 p.m. EDT	Ottawa Redblacks	L 27–30 (OT)	3–3	TSN/RDS	Molson Stadium	17,498	Recap
9	7	Fri, Aug 9	7:00 p.m. EDT	Saskatchewan Roughriders	L 10–17	3–4	TSN/RDS	Molson Stadium	16,580	Recap
10	8	Sat, Aug 17	7:00 p.m. EDT	@ Calgary Stampeders	W 40–34 (2OT)	4–4	TSN/RDS	McMahon Stadium	24,453	Recap
11	9	Sun, Aug 25	12:00 p.m. EDT	vs. Toronto Argonauts	W 28–22	5–4	TSN/RDS/ESPNews	Croix-Bleue Medavie Stadium	10,126	Recap
12	Bye									
13	10	Fri, Sept 6	7:30 p.m. EDT	BC Lions	W 21–16	6–4	TSN/RDS	Molson Stadium	17,487	Recap
14	11	Sat, Sept 14	7:00 p.m. EDT	@ Saskatchewan Roughriders	L 25–27	6–5	TSN/RDS	Mosaic Stadium	30,205	Recap
15	12	Sat, Sept 21	4:00 p.m. EDT	Winnipeg Blue Bombers	W 38–37	7–5	TSN/RDS	Molson Stadium	19,070	Recap
16	13	Sat, Sept 28	10:00 p.m. EDT	@ BC Lions	L 23–25	7–6	TSN/RDS	BC Place	17,353	Recap
17	14	Sat, Oct 5	4:00 p.m. EDT	Calgary Stampeders	W 21–17	8–6	TSN/RDS	Molson Stadium	18,454	Recap
18	15	Sat, Oct 12	4:00 p.m. EDT	@ Winnipeg Blue Bombers	L 24–35	8–7	TSN/RDS	IG Field	20,907	Recap
19	16	Fri, Oct 18	7:00 p.m. EDT	Toronto Argonauts	W 27–24	9–7	TSN/RDS/ESPNews	Molson Stadium	17,003	Recap
20	17	Sat, Oct 26	1:00 p.m. EDT	Hamilton Tiger-Cats	L 26–38	9–8	TSN/RDS	Molson Stadium	17,264	Recap
21	18	Fri, Nov 1	7:00 p.m. EDT	@ Ottawa Redblacks	W 42–32	10–8	TSN/RDS	TD Place Stadium	24,592	Recap

# Games played with white uniforms.
# Games played with blue uniforms.

== Post-season ==
=== Schedule ===
Game	Date	Kickoff	Opponent	Results		TV	Venue	Attendance	Summary
Game	Date	Kickoff	Opponent	Score	Record	TV	Venue	Attendance	Summary
East Semi-Final	Sun, Nov 10	1:00 p.m. EST	vs. Edmonton Eskimos	L 29–37	0–1	TSN/RDS/ESPN2	Molson Stadium	21,054	Recap

# Games played with blue uniforms.

== Roster ==
Montreal Alouettes 2019 final roster
Quarterbacks: 8 Vernon Adams; 17 Antonio Pipkin; 18 Matt Shiltz; Running backs: 24 Jeremiah Johnson; 80 Spencer Moore; 38 Christophe Normand; 31 William Stanback; Receivers: 19 Dante Absher; 89 Mario Alford; 4 Quan Bray; 81 Felix Faubert-Lussier; 82 Kaion Julien-Grant; 87 Geno Lewis; 9 Jake Wieneke	Offensive linemen: 57 Sean Jamieson G/T; 62 Diego Kuhlmann T/G; 51 Kristian Matte C; 55 Landon Rice T/G; 66 Trey Rutherford G; 54 Chris Schleuger T; 59 Zach Wilkinson G/C; 50 Spencer Wilson G/T; Defensive linemen: 48 Bo Banner DE; 97 Woody Baron DT; 42 Jean-Samuel Blanc DE; 7 John Bowman DE; 98 Ryan Brown DT; 94 Fabion Foote DT; 55 Gabe Knapton DE; 93 Antonio Simmons DE	Linebackers: 21 Chris Ackie; 40 Brandon Calver; 20 Boseko Lokombo; 10 Henoc Muamba; 53 Frédéric Plesius; 49 Jean-Gabriel Poulin; Defensive backs: 23 Tommie Campbell; 1 Ciante Evans; 33 Jarnor Jones; 36 Paul Kozachuk; 3 Patrick Levels; 45 Najee Murray; 26 Greg Reid; 43 Dom Termansen	Special teams: 37 Martin Bédard LS; 14 Boris Bede K/P; Practice roster: 88 Malcolm Carter WR; 41 Jason Hall LB; 99 Lord Hyeamang DT; 0 Aarion Maxey-Penton DB; 84 Étienne Moisan WR; 22 Shaq Murray-Lawrence RB; 6 Hugo Richard QB; 95 Michael Sanelli DT; 35 Juan Tamayo DB; 79 Enrique Yenny K/P	Injured list: 90 Nate Anderson DT; 25 Ryan Carter DB; 30 Ty Cranston DB; 85 B. J. Cunningham SB; 57 Tevin Floyd LB; 61 Donald Hawkins T; 60 Tyler Johnstone T/G; 16 Taylor Loffler DB; 34 Glenn Love LB; 12 Chris Matthews WR; 5 DeVier Posey WR; 91 Ja'Von Rolland-Jones DE; 83 Shakeir Ryan WR; 32 Ryder Stone RB; 67 Tony Washington T; Italics indicate American players

== Coaching staff ==
Montreal Alouettes Staff
Front office: Owner – Canadian Football League; President/CEO – Patrick Boivin; General manager –; Assistant general manager of player personnel – Joe Mack; Director of national scouting – Miles Gorrell; Director of football operations – Patrick Donovan; Manager of football operations – Cailtin Bell; Director of Pro Personnel–; Head coach: Head coach – Khari Jones; Offensive coaches: Offensive Coordinator & Quarterbacks – Khari Jones; Offensive line and run game coordinator – Paul Dunn; Receivers – Robert Gordon; Running backs – André Bolduc; Offensive assistant – Marquay McDaniel; Offensive assistant – Luc Brodeur-Jourdain	Defensive coaches: Defensive coordinator – Bob Slowik; Linebackers coach – Todd Howard; Defensive backs coach – Morris Lolar; Assistant defensive backs coach – Vincent Nardone; Special teams coaches: Special teams coordinator – Mickey Donovan; Special teams assistant – Anthony Ierullo; Staff: Equipment manager – Greg McGuire; Assistant equipment manager – Ryan Batten; Head athletic therapist – Rodney Sassi; → Coaching staff
