= Thiadric Hansen =

German gridiron football player (born 1992)

- Hansen with the Winnipeg Blue Bombers in 2026

No. 35 – Winnipeg Blue Bombers
- Position: Linebacker
- Roster status: Active
- CFL status: Global

Personal information
- Born: December 26, 1992 (age 33); Flensburg, Schleswig-Holstein, Germany
- Listed height: 6 ft 1 in (1.85 m)
- Listed weight: 235 lb (107 kg)

Career information
- Oberliga: Flensburg Sealords
- CFL draft: 2019 Euro: 1st round, 2nd overall pick

Career history
- 2012–2018: Kiel Baltic Hurricanes
- 2019: Potsdam Royals*
- 2019: Winnipeg Blue Bombers
- 2020: Panthers Wrocław
- 2021: Cologne Centurions*
- 2021–2023: Winnipeg Blue Bombers
- 2024–2025: Toronto Argonauts
- 2026–present: Winnipeg Blue Bombers
- * Offseason or practice squad member only

Awards and highlights
- 3× Grey Cup champion (2019, 2021, 2024)
- Stats at CFL.ca

Thiadric Hansen (born December 26, 1992) is a German professional Canadian football linebacker for the Winnipeg Blue Bombers of the Canadian Football League (CFL). He is a three-time Grey Cup champion after winning with the Winnipeg Blue Bombers in 2019 and 2021 and with the Argonauts in 2024.

== Professional career ==
Pre-draft measurables
Height	Weight	40-yard dash	20-yard shuttle	Three-cone drill	Vertical jump	Broad jump	Bench press
6 ft 1 1/2 in (1.87 m)	233 lb (106 kg)	4.88 s	4.72 s	7.66 s	38.0 in (0.97 m)	10 ft 2 1/8 in (3.10 m)	20 reps
All values from CFL Combine

=== Early career ===
Hansen first played for the Flensburg Sealords in the Oberliga before joining the Kiel Baltic Hurricanes in 2012. He played for the Hurricanes for seven years and was the club's all-time leading tackler. He then joined the Potsdam Royals in 2019 before getting the invitation to try out for the CFL just before the start of the 2019 GFL season.

=== Winnipeg Blue Bombers (first stint) ===
Following a successful showcase, Hansen was drafted second overall in the 2019 CFL European draft by the Winnipeg Blue Bombers and was added to the roster on May 15, 2019. Overall in 2019, he played in all 18 regular season games and recorded five defensive tackles, a sack, and two forced fumbles. He also played in all three of the Blue Bombers playoff games where he had two special teams tackles. Hansen played in his first Grey Cup game and had a thunderous hit on special teams taking out both a blocker and the returner, a hit for which he received national acclaim. Hansen and the Bombers would go on to win the 107th Grey Cup against the Hamilton Tiger-Cats which ended a championship drought of 28 years for Winnipeg.

=== Panthers Wrocław ===
With the 2020 CFL season cancelled, Hansen opted out of his contract and joined the Panthers Wrocław, a Polish team in the Central European Football League as a way to maintain and sharpen his skills. The Panthers won the Polish Bowl in 2020 against the Lowlanders Białystok.

=== Cologne Centurions ===
Hansen signed with the new European League of Football's Cologne Centurions (ELF) under a contract that contained a clause allowing him to return to the CFL in time for training camp. However, he did not play for the team as he returned to the Blue Bombers.

=== Winnipeg Blue Bombers (second stint) ===
Hansen signed a one-year contract with the Blue Bombers on January 6, 2021. In 2021, Hansen played in all 14 regular season games where he had eight defensive tackles, 12 special teams tackles, three sacks, and one forced fumble. He then had two special teams tackles in the team's West Final victory over the Saskatchewan Roughriders. He played in his second career Grey Cup game and while he did not record any stats, he won his second championship following the Blue Bombers win in the 108th Grey Cup game. He became a free agent upon the expiry of his contract on February 8, 2022. Hansen was reluctant to sign another contract since he would be still be making the minimum salary for a Global player ($54,000) due to the league's collective bargaining agreement, despite being a productive veteran on the team. However, on June 18, 2022, it was announced that Hansen had re-signed with the Blue Bombers.

In 2022, Hansen played in ten regular season games where he had three defensive tackles and nine special teams tackles. He suffered an Achilles injury in the Labour Day Classic and was placed on the injured list for the remainder of the season. He played in just four regular season games in 2023 where he had three defensive tackles. Hansen became a free agent upon the expiry of his contract on February 13, 2024.

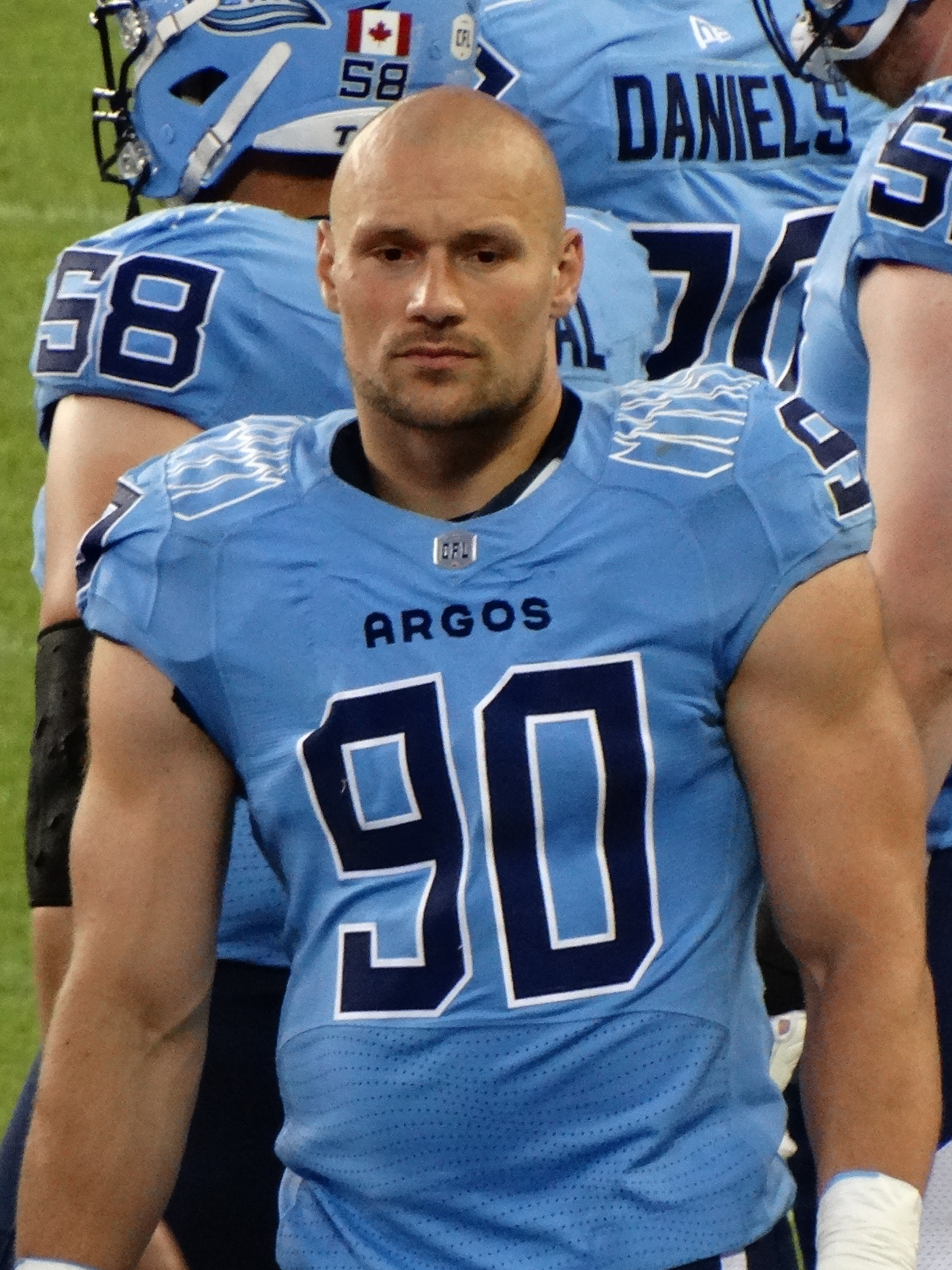
Hansen with the Toronto Argonauts in 2024

=== Toronto Argonauts ===
On February 13, 2024, it was announced that Hansen had signed with the Toronto Argonauts. In 2024, he played 12 regular season games where he recorded four defensive tackles, ten special teams tackles, and one sack. He also played in all three post-season games, including the 111th Grey Cup where he had three special teams tackles in the Argonauts' 41–24 victory over the Winnipeg Blue Bombers.

On May 13, 2026, Hansen was released by the Argonauts.

=== Winnipeg Blue Bombers (third stint) ===
On September 20, 2026, Hansen signed with the Winnipeg Blue Bombers practice roster.
