= Chris Schleuger =

American gridiron football player (born 1995)

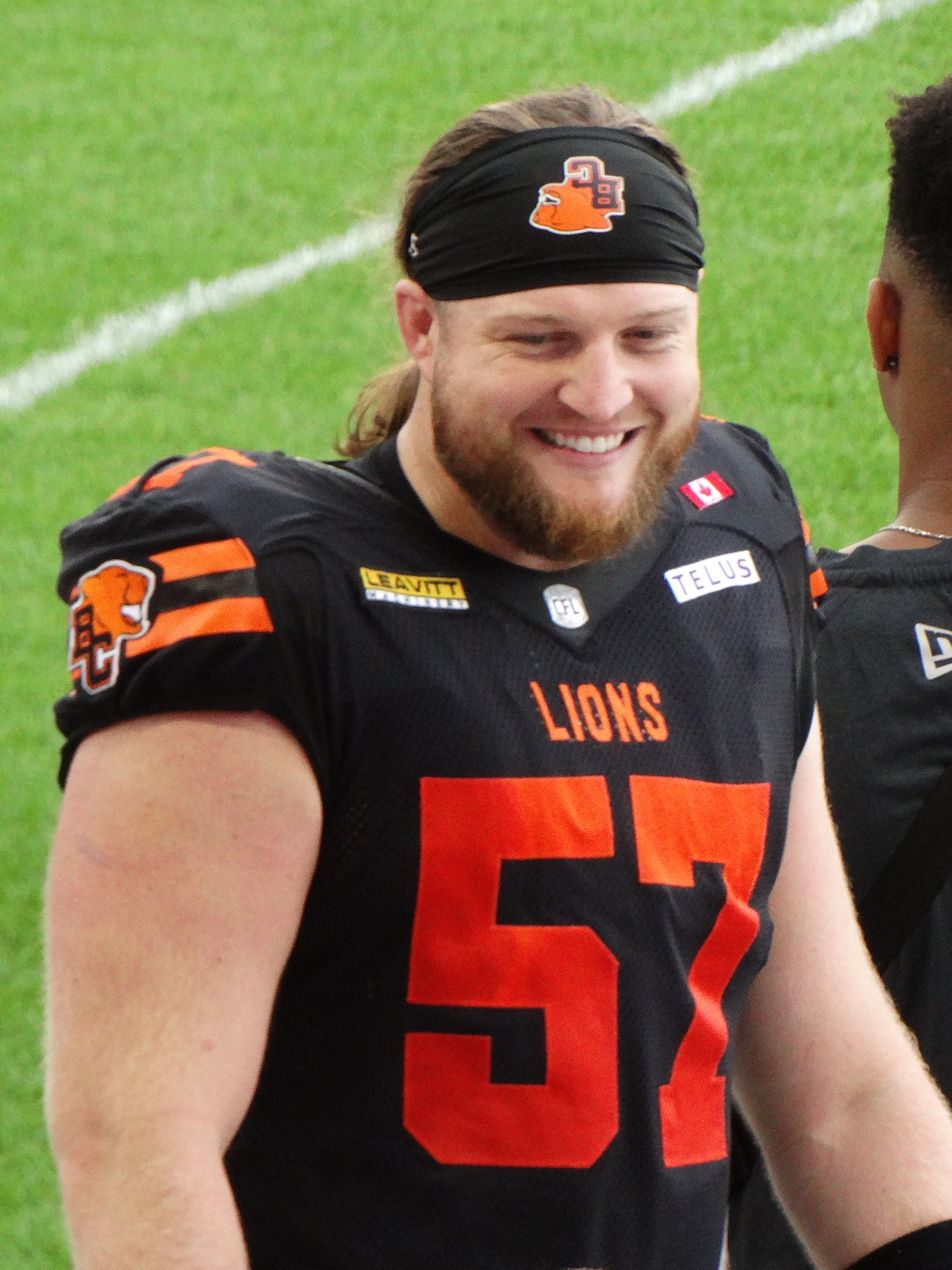
- Schleuger with the BC Lions in 2025

No. 57 – BC Lions
- Position: Offensive lineman
- Roster status: Active
- CFL status: American

Personal information
- Born: May 12, 1995 (age 31); Wesley, Iowa, U.S.
- Listed height: 6 ft 4 in (1.93 m)
- Listed weight: 302 lb (137 kg)

Career information
- High school: West Hancock (Britt, Iowa)
- College: Iowa Western CC (2014); Northern Iowa (2015); UAB (2017)
- NFL draft: 2018: undrafted

Career history
- 2018: Pittsburgh Steelers*
- 2018: Saskatchewan Roughriders*
- 2019: Birmingham Iron
- 2019–2022: Montreal Alouettes
- 2023–present: BC Lions
- * Offseason or practice squad member only
- Stats at CFL.ca

Chris Schleuger (born May 12, 1995) is an American professional football offensive lineman for the BC Lions of the Canadian Football League (CFL). He played college football for Iowa Western, Northern Iowa and Alabama-Birmingham. In professional leagues, Schleuger was previously a member of the Pittsburgh Steelers, Saskatchewan Roughriders, Birmingham Iron and Montreal Alouettes.

== Early life ==
Schleuger was born on May 12, 1995 in the rural farming community of Wesley, Iowa as one of two sons. He attended West Hancock High School in Britt, Iowa where he played kicker, fullback and defensive end positions as a member of the West Hancock Eagles football team. In his freshman season, Schleuger earned his first letter. After playing his first season as a kicker, the 6 ft 4 in (1.93 m), 245 pounds (111 kg) Schleuger transitioned into fullback and running back positions, earning First team All-District Fullback and Iowa Newspaper Association Third Team All-State Running back honors. Schleuger's performance during his senior season was rewarded with Iowa High School Athletic Association (IHSAA) First and Second Team honors. Despite his athletic performances including making 76 touchdowns and totaling 5,452 yards – a record ranked 15th best in state history – and receiving numerous state and district honors Schleuger was not a ranked recruiting prospect. After graduating high school in 2013, Schleuger would go on instead to play junior college football.

== College career ==
Schleuger first played college football for the Iowa Western Community College Reivers in 2014. He then transferred to the University of Northern Iowa to play for the Panthers in 2015, where he played in all 14 games, starting in eight at left tackle. Schleuger transferred again to the University of Alabama at Birmingham in 2016 before the football program's reinstatement in 2017. He played for the UAB Blazers during the 2017 season, appearing in 13 games while starting in 12 at left guard. While at Northern Iowa, Schleuger was also a member of the Panthers wrestling team and was a 5th place All-American. After his transfer to Alabama-Birmingham to play his senior season of college football, Schleuger majored in communication studies.

== Professional career ==
Pre-draft measurables
Height	Weight	Arm length	Hand span	Wingspan	40-yard dash	10-yard split	20-yard split	20-yard shuttle	Three-cone drill	Vertical jump	Broad jump	Bench press
6 ft 3 3/4 in (1.92 m)	302 lb (137 kg)	31 1/2 in (0.80 m)	9 in (0.23 m)	6 ft 5 1/4 in (1.96 m)	5.15 s	1.79 s	2.92 s	4.90 s	7.87 s	29.0 in (0.74 m)	8 ft 5 in (2.57 m)	17 reps
All values from Pro Day

=== Pittsburgh Steelers ===
After going undrafted in the 2018 NFL draft, Schleuger signed with the Pittsburgh Steelers as a free agent. He attended training camp with the team, but was part of the final cuts on September 1, 2018.

=== Saskatchewan Roughriders ===
On September 26, 2018, Schleuger signed a practice roster agreement with the Saskatchewan Roughriders. However, he did not dress in a game and became a free agent at the end of the season.

=== Birmingham Iron ===
In November 2018, Schleuger signed with the Birmingham Iron. He was eventually released by the team before the league folded.

=== Montreal Alouettes ===
Schleuger signed with the Montreal Alouettes on May 19, 2019. He played and started in 13 regular season games in 2019 and also started in the East Semi-Final loss to the Edmonton Eskimos that year. He did not play in 2020 due to the cancellation of the 2020 CFL season.

In 2021, Schleuger played in three games, starting in two. He signed a contract extension with the Alouettes on February 7, 2022, and played in six games in 2022, starting in three. He became a free agent upon the expiry of his contract on February 14, 2023.

=== BC Lions ===
On the first day of free agency, on February 14, 2023, Schleuger signed with the BC Lions, to a two-year contract. He spent most of the 2023 season as a healthy scratch, but started in one game at left tackle in August. After spending much of the 2024 season on the Lions' injured lists, Schleuger signed a 2-year contract extension on January 31, 2025. On June 19, 2025, Schleuger was again placed on the Lions' 1-game injured list. He rejoined the active roster on June 26, 2025. On October 16, 2025, Schleuger was placed on the Lions' 1-game injured list for a second time, where he spent the remainder of the 2025 CFL regular season. He rejoined the active roster on October 31, 2025, in advance of the Western Semifinal game of the 2025 playoffs. On January 5, 2025, Schleuger re-signed with the Lions, on a two-year contract extension.

On September 3, 2026, Schleuger was placed on the Lions' 6-game injured list and he remained there to end the 2026 CFL season.

== Personal life ==
Schleuger was born to parents Matt and Kathy Schleuger and has one brother.
