= Dylan Wynn =

American gridiron football player (born 1993)

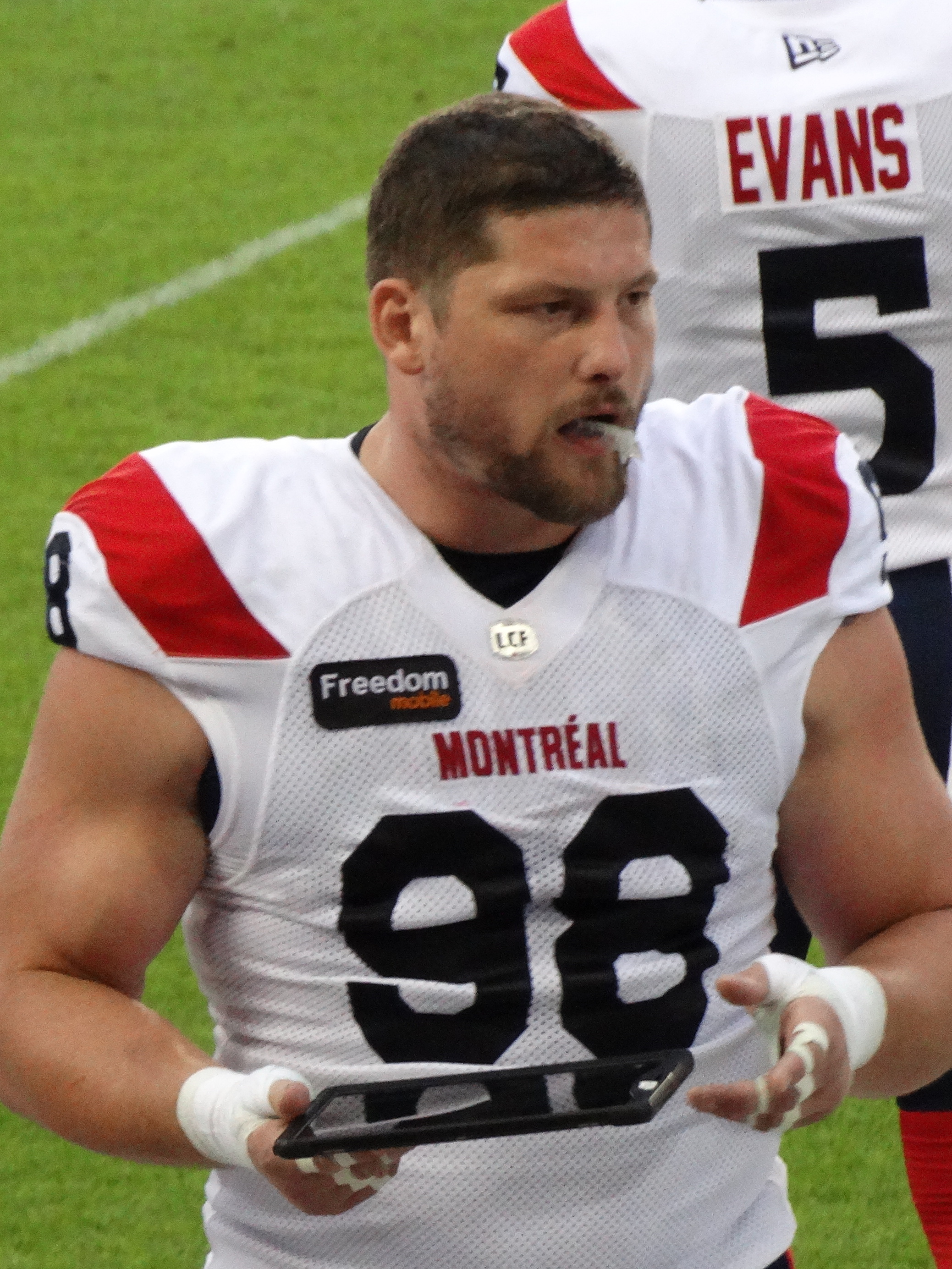
- Wynn with the Montreal Alouettes in 2024

No. 97,96,98
- Position: Defensive Tackle

Personal information
- Born: June 1, 1993 (age 33); Arlington, Texas, U.S.
- Listed height: 6 ft 2 in (1.88 m)
- Listed weight: 290 lb (132 kg)

Career information
- High school: De La Salle (Concord, California)
- College: Oregon State
- NFL draft: 2015: undrafted

Career history
- Cleveland Browns (2015–2016); Toronto Argonauts (2017–2018); Arizona Hotshots (2019); Hamilton Tiger-Cats (2019–2023); Montreal Alouettes (2024–2025); Ottawa Redblacks (2026)*; Montreal Alouettes (2026)
- * Offseason or practice squad member only

Awards and highlights
- Grey Cup champion (2017); CFL All-Star (2019); 3× CFL East All-Star (2017, 2019, 2021)
- Stats at Pro Football Reference
- Stats at CFL.ca

Charles Dylan Wynn (born June 1, 1993) is an American professional football defensive tackle for the Montreal Alouettes of the Canadian Football League (CFL). He played college football at Oregon State. He previously spent time in the National Football League (NFL) and the Alliance of American Football (AAF).

== Early life ==
Wynn was a 2 time state champion at De La Salle High School, playing with Terron Ward and Austin Hooper.

== College career ==
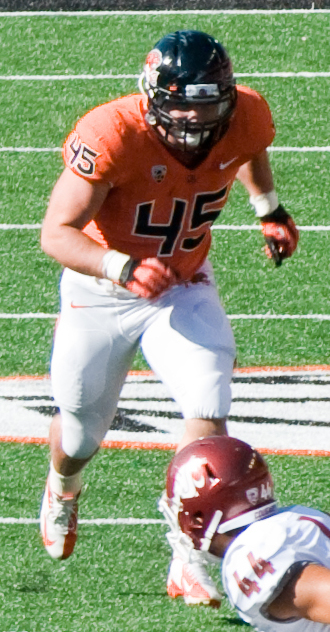
Wynn with the Oregon State Beavers in 2012

He played college football for Oregon State University where he was second-team all-conference.

== Professional career ==
=== Cleveland Browns ===
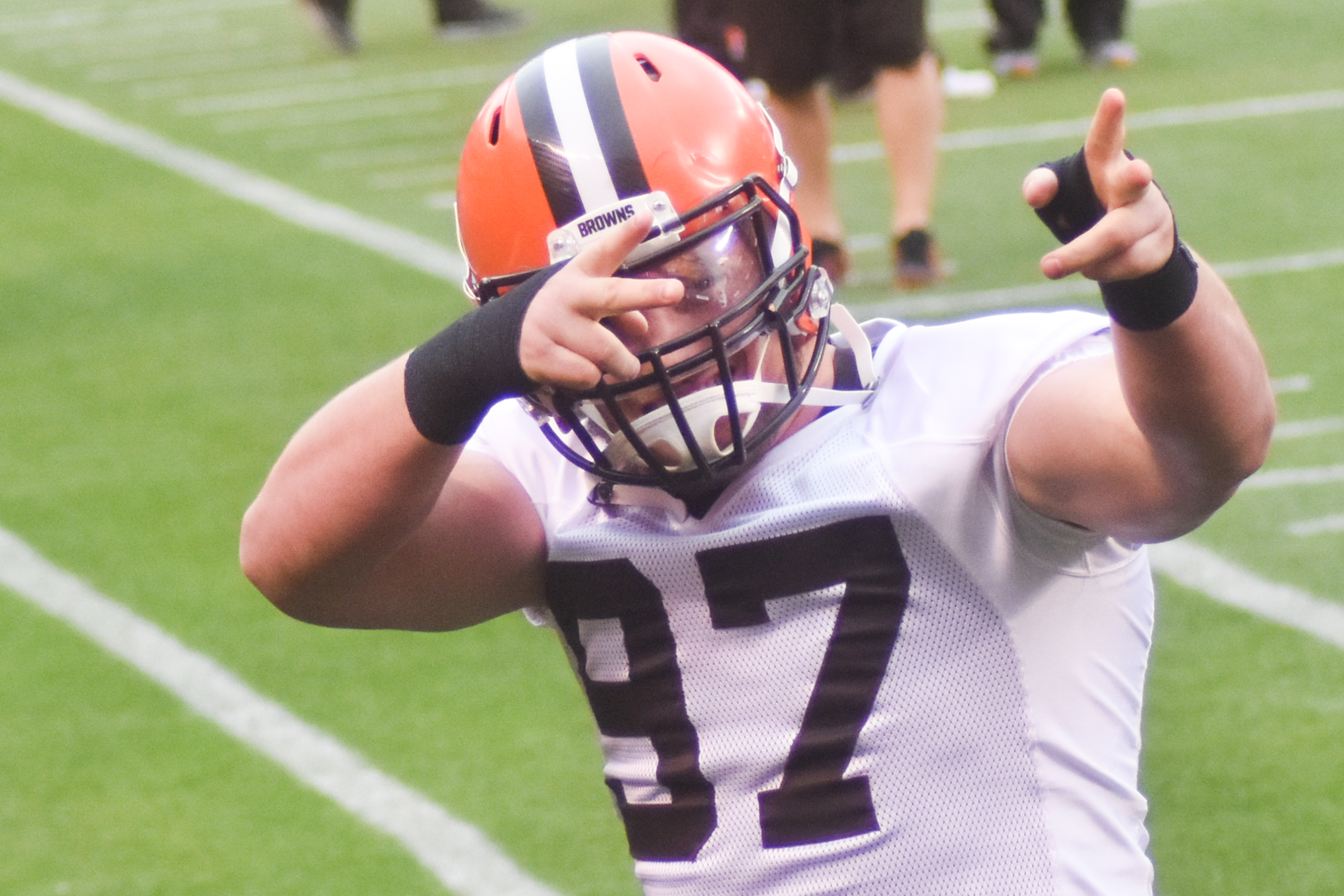
Wynn with the Cleveland Browns in 2016

Wynn spent parts of two years with the Cleveland Browns. 2015 was spent on and off the practice squad, and the following season saw Wynn placed on injured reserve prior to preseason play, before being released.

=== Toronto Argonauts ===
As a rookie playing for the Toronto Argonauts during the 2017 CFL season, Wynn made 34 tackles and 6 sacks. After receiving consideration for the CFL's Most Outstanding Rookie Award Wynn was named an Eastern All-Star. He was one of three Argos defensive linemen to be named an Eastern All-Star, alongside Cleyon Laing and Victor Butler. Rookie of the Year would eventually go to Wynn's teammate, running back James Wilder Jr. Wynn and the Argonauts finished in 1st place for the CFL East, and went on to win the 105th Grey Cup championship over the Calgary Stampeders 27–24. Wynn had a challenging 2018 season, missing several games with injury and being suspended for one game for a spearing penalty on Edmonton running back C. J. Gable during a week 5 loss. In 11 games, Wynn finished with 30 tackles and 2 sacks.

=== Arizona Hotshots ===
When Wynn became a free agent in the CFL on February 12, 2019, he received numerous offers but elected to sign with the Arizona Hotshots of the AAF on February 19. The startup developmental league was in its third week of play at the time of Wynn's signing, with 8 weeks of regular season play remaining. However, the AAF suspended operations after week 8; Wynn was credited with 5 tackles during his time with the league.

=== Hamilton Tiger-Cats ===
Wynn signed with the Hamilton Tiger-Cats of the CFL on May 8, 2019. Wynn was part of a ferocious defensive line, putting up career highs; Wynn played in all 18 games, made 44 tackles, and 11 sacks, including a 3 sack performance against the BC Lions in Week 11; his sack dance was a fan favorite throughout the season. Wynn was named a top performer for the month of August, and returned to the divisional All-Star list.

Wynn became a free agent upon the expiry of his contract on February 13, 2024.

=== Montreal Alouettes ===
On February 14, 2024, it was announced that Wynn had signed with the Montreal Alouettes. His contract expired on February 10, 2026.

=== Ottawa Redblacks ===
On February 10, 2026, it was announced that Wynn had signed with the Ottawa Redblacks. He was released on May 30 as part of final roster cuts.

=== Montreal Alouettes (second stint) ===
On September 20, 2026, Wynn signed with the Montreal Alouettes.
