= Eric Rogers (gridiron football) =

American football player (born 1991)

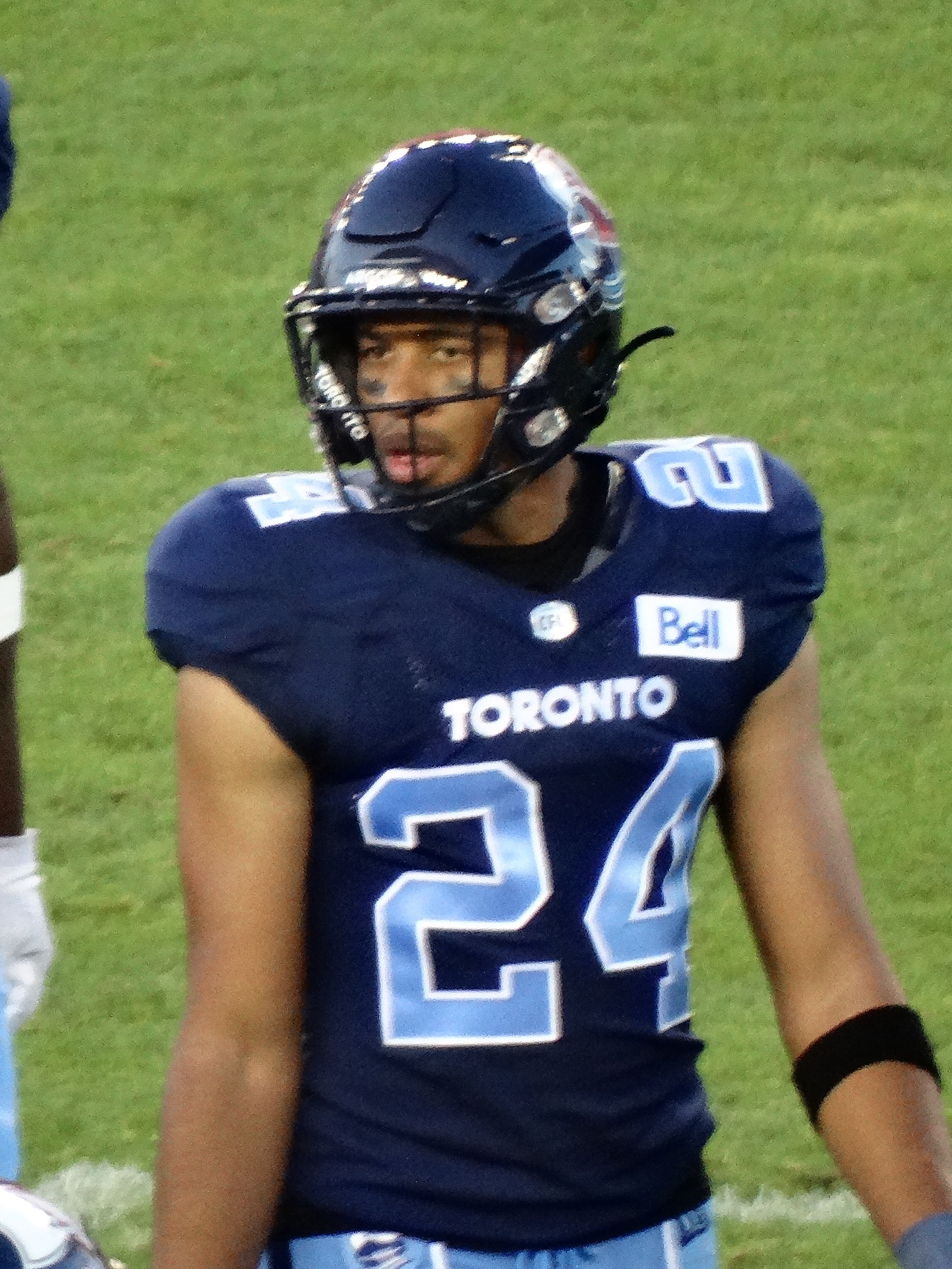
- Rogers with the Toronto Argonauts in 2022

No. 80, 15, 24
- Position: Wide receiver

Personal information
- Born: February 12, 1991 (age 35); Glendora, California, U.S.
- Listed height: 6 ft 3 in (1.91 m)
- Listed weight: 210 lb (95 kg)

Career information
- High school: Covina (CA) Charter Oak
- College: Cal Lutheran
- NFL draft: 2013: undrafted

Career history
- Dallas Cowboys (2013)*; Portland Thunder (2014); Ottawa Redblacks (2014)*; Calgary Stampeders (2014–2015); San Francisco 49ers (2016); Calgary Stampeders (2018–2020); Toronto Argonauts (2021–2022)
- * Offseason or practice squad member only

Awards and highlights
- 3× Grey Cup champion (2014, 2018, 2022); CFL All-Star (2015); 2× CFL West All-Star (2015, 2019)

Career CFL statistics
- Receptions: 149
- Receiving yards: 1,955
- Receiving touchdowns: 18
- Stats at CFL.ca

Career AFL statistics
- Receptions: 73
- Receiving yards: 903
- Receiving touchdowns: 27
- Stats at ArenaFan.com

Eric Dionne Rogers (born February 12, 1991) is an American former professional football wide receiver. He played college football for the Cal Lutheran Kingsmen and was a CFL All-Star in 2015. Rogers was a member of the Dallas Cowboys, Portland Thunder, Ottawa Redblacks, Calgary Stampeders, San Francisco 49ers, and Toronto Argonauts.

== College career ==
Rogers was a receiver at California Lutheran University, an NCAA Division III school, which plays in the Southern California Intercollegiate Athletic Conference (SCIAC). He set school records for career receptions (220), receiving yards (3,461), receiving touchdowns (41) and total scoring (270). As a senior, Rogers set CLU records with 91 receptions and 18 touchdowns. The receiver also posted 1,298 yards that season. As the only athlete to receive All-America honors in two sports, football and track & field, Rogers is a member of the Cal Lutheran Hall of Fame. During his career, the team was part of four consecutive SCIAC championship and CLU never lost a league contest.

== Professional career ==
Pre-draft measurables
Height	Weight	40-yard dash	10-yard split	20-yard split	20-yard shuttle	Three-cone drill	Vertical jump	Broad jump	Bench press
6 ft 3 in (1.91 m)	206 lb (93 kg)	4.50 s	1.58 s	2.58 s	4.20 s	7.08 s	37.0 in (0.94 m)	10 ft 1 in (3.07 m)	9 reps
All values from Pro Day

=== Dallas Cowboys ===
On April 28, 2013, he signed with the Dallas Cowboys as an undrafted free agent.

=== Portland Thunder and Ottawa Redblacks ===
Rogers was assigned to the Portland Thunder of the Arena Football League (AFL) in 2014, but was placed on the other league exempt list when he was signed by Ottawa Redblacks. After failing to make the Redblacks' roster, Rogers was activated by the Thunder. After 9 games, where Rogers posted 73 receptions, 903 receiving yards, and 27 touchdowns, the Thunder placed Rogers on the other league exempt list, this time as he signed with the Calgary Stampeders.

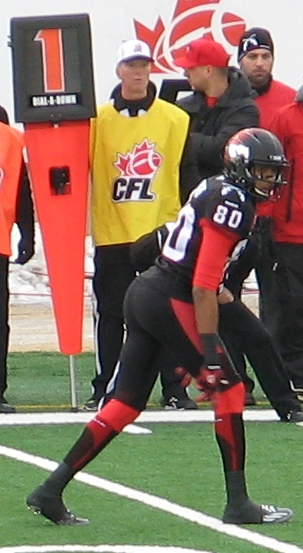
Rogers with the Calgary Stampeders in 2014

=== Calgary Stampeders (first stint) ===
Rogers was signed by the Calgary Stampeders on July 7, 2014. He made a large impact in the West Division Final on November 23, 2014, catching 3 passes for 60 yards and scoring two touchdowns. In 2015, Rogers' numbers were league-leading: "Rogers put up big numbers this past season for the Calgary Stampeders. He led the league with 1,448 receiving yards, was fourth with 87 receptions, and tied for the league lead with 10 receiving touchdowns."

=== San Francisco 49ers ===
On January 20, 2016, Rogers signed with the San Francisco 49ers after visiting 16 different NFL teams. He tore his ACL in training camp and missed the entire 2016 season. On August 27, 2016, Rogers was placed on injured reserve. On May 2, 2017, Rogers was waived by the 49ers.

=== Calgary Stampeders (second stint) ===
On June 6, 2018, Rogers decided to re-sign with his former team, the Stampeders. Rogers played in nine games for the Stamps in 2018, catching 36 passes for 499 yards with 5 touchdowns: He missed half the season with a knee injury. In the West-Division Final playoff game Rogers caught three touchdown passes, helping the Stampeders to advance to their third consecutive Grey Cup match. Only 90 minutes before the start of free agency Rogers and the Stampeders announced they had agreed to a two-year contract extension on February 12, 2019. He played in 17 regular season games where he recorded 85 receptions for 1,080 yards and ten touchdowns and was named a CFL West All-Star. He did not play in 2020 due to the cancellation of the 2020 CFL season.

=== Toronto Argonauts ===
As a pending free agent entering the 2021 CFL season, Rogers' playing rights were traded to the Toronto Argonauts on January 31, 2021. Rogers and the Argos agreed to a contract the following day. He struggled with injuries in 2021, as he played in just six games, but had a productive six catches for 346 yards and three touchdowns. In the East Final, Rogers had six catches for 62 yards in the loss to the Hamilton Tiger-Cats.

In 2022, Rogers again dealt with injuries as he began the season on the injured list before making his season debut on August 6, 2022, where he recorded three catches for 30 yards. However, he suffered another injury and did not play again in 2022, as he remained on the injured list during the Argonauts' victory in the 109th Grey Cup game. He became a free agent upon the expiry of his contract on February 14, 2023.
