= Winston Rose =

American gridiron football player (born 1993)

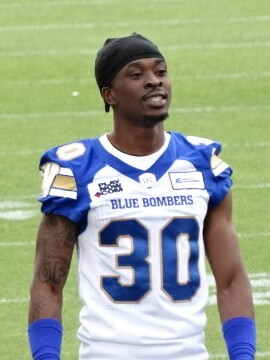
- Rose with the Winnipeg Blue Bombers in 2022

Profile
- Position: Defensive back

Personal information
- Born: November 29, 1993 (age 32); Inglewood, California, U.S.
- Listed height: 6 ft 0 in (1.83 m)
- Listed weight: 180 lb (82 kg)

Career information
- High school: St. Genevieve (Panorama City, CA)
- College: New Mexico State
- NFL draft: 2016: undrafted

Career history
- Los Angeles Rams (2016)*; Indianapolis Colts (2016)*; Toronto Argonauts (2016–2017)*; Ottawa Redblacks (2017); BC Lions (2018); Winnipeg Blue Bombers (2019); Cincinnati Bengals (2020); Winnipeg Blue Bombers (2021–2023); Ottawa Redblacks (2024)*
- * Offseason or practice squad member only

Awards and highlights
- 2× Grey Cup champion (2019, 2021); CFL All-Star (2019); CFL West All-Star (2019)
- Stats at Pro Football Reference
- Stats at CFL.ca

Winston Rose (born November 29, 1993) is an American professional football defensive back. Rose won two Grey Cups with the Winnipeg Blue Bombers. He played college football for the New Mexico State Aggies.

== Professional career ==
=== Los Angeles Rams ===
Rose was originally signed as an undrafted free agent by the Los Angeles Rams of the National Football League (NFL) in May 2016, but was released shortly after.

=== Indianapolis Colts ===
After his release, Rose signed with the Indianapolis Colts. He played in three pre-season games with the Colts, but was released.

=== Toronto Argonauts ===
Rose then signed by the Toronto Argonauts to their practice roster on September 19, 2016. He was re-signed during the following off-season and began the 2017 season on the Argonauts' practice roster.

=== Ottawa Redblacks (first stint) ===
He was released in July. Shortly after his release, Rose signed to the Ottawa Redblacks' practice roster on July 24, 2017.

Rose played in his first professional regular season game on September 29, 2017, against the Saskatchewan Roughriders where he recorded five defensive tackles. He was re-signed by the Redblacks after the end of the season, only to be released by the team on March 7, 2018.

=== BC Lions ===
Rose was then signed by the BC Lions on March 9, 2018, and played in all 18 games that season and recorded 32 defensive tackles and five interceptions. Rose became a free agent following the season's end.

=== Winnipeg Blue Bombers (first stint) ===
In the offseason, Rose signed with the Winnipeg Blue Bombers on February 13, 2019. He played and started in all 18 regular season games, recording 58 defensive tackles and a league-leading nine interceptions, returning one for his first career touchdown. For his dominant season, he was named a West Division All-Star and CFL All-Star for the first time in his career.

=== Cincinnati Bengals ===
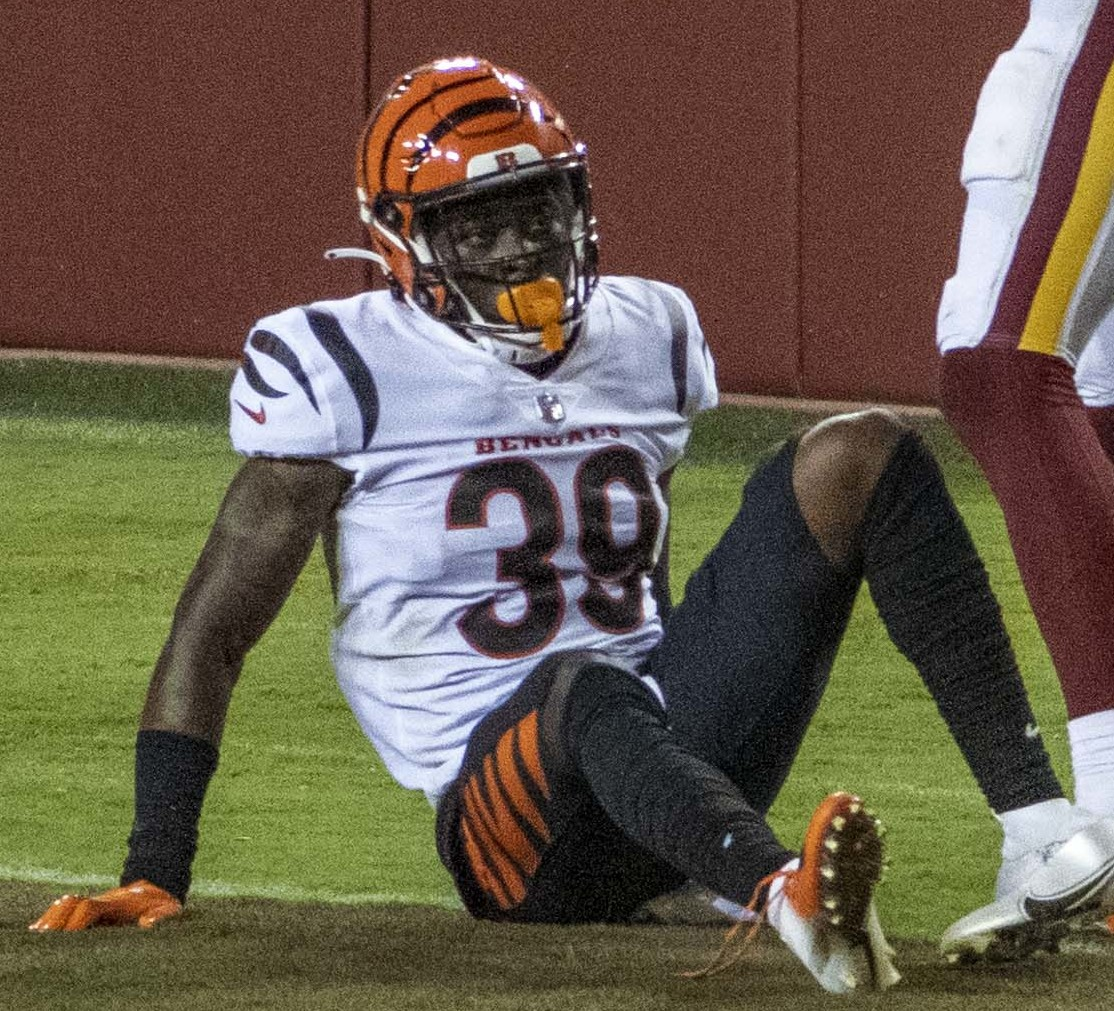
Rose with the Cincinnati Bengals in 2021

On December 31, 2019, Rose signed a reserve/future contract with the Cincinnati Bengals of the NFL. He was waived on September 5, 2020, and signed to the practice squad the next day. He was elevated to the active roster on October 24 for the team's week 7 game against the Cleveland Browns, and reverted to the practice squad after the game. He was placed on the practice squad/COVID-19 list by the team on November 11, and activated back to the practice squad on November 25. He was elevated to the active roster again for the week 17 game against the Baltimore Ravens, and reverted to the practice squad again following the game. He signed a reserve/future contract on January 4, 2021.

On August 31, 2021, Rose was waived by the Bengals and re-signed to the practice squad the next day. He was released on September 6.

=== Winnipeg Blue Bombers (second stint) ===
On October 20, 2021, it was announced that Rose had re-signed with the Blue Bombers. He played in three regular season games and had five defensive tackles. He also played and started in the 108th Grey Cup game where he had four defensive tackles in the Blue Bombers' repeat victory over the Hamilton Tiger-Cats.

In 2022, Rose played in 17 regular season games where he recorded 66 defensive tackles, three interceptions, and one forced fumble. In the 109th Grey Cup, he had five defensive tackles, but the Blue Bombers lost to the Toronto Argonauts. In the 2023 season, Rose played in just ten games due to injury as he had 32 defensive tackles and one interception. He was a healthy scratch in the West Final and 110th Grey Cup as the Blue Bombers lost to the Montreal Alouettes. In the following off-season, he became a free agent upon the expiry of his contract on February 13, 2024.

=== Ottawa Redblacks (second stint) ===
On June 11, 2024, it was announced that Rose had signed with the Redblacks to a practice roster agreement. However, he was released just five days later on June 16, 2024.
