= Frankie Williams (gridiron football) =

American football player (born 1993)

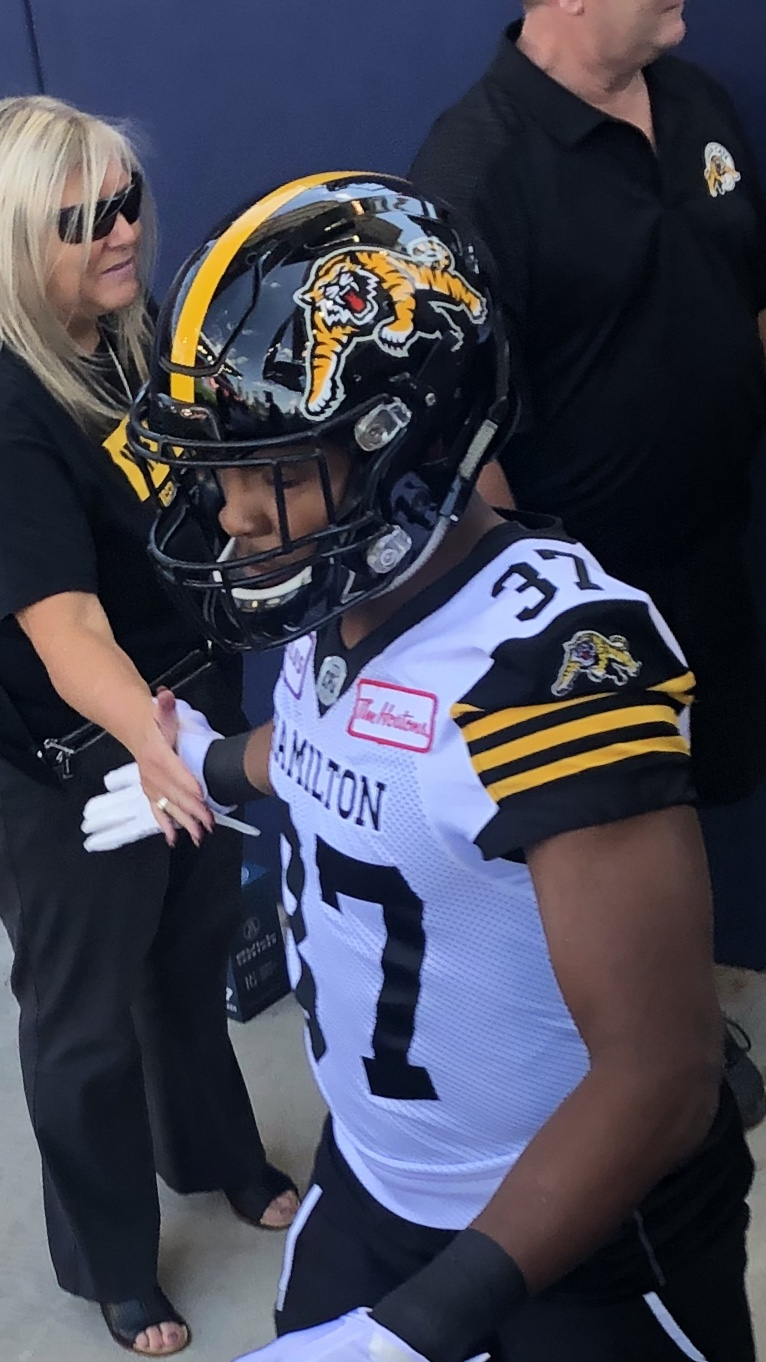
- Williams with the Hamilton Tiger-Cats in 2019

No. 37
- Position: Cornerback/Kick returner

Personal information
- Born: March 28, 1993 (age 33); Tampa, Florida, U.S.
- Listed height: 5 ft 9 in (1.75 m)
- Listed weight: 190 lb (86 kg)

Career information
- High school: Robinson (Tampa)
- College: Purdue
- NFL draft: 2016: undrafted

Career history
- Indianapolis Colts (2016); Hamilton Tiger-Cats (2018–2022)

Awards and highlights
- CFL All-Star (2019); CFL East All-Star (2019); John Agro Special Teams Award (2019)

Career NFL statistics
- Total tackles: 1
- Stats at Pro Football Reference
- Stats at CFL.ca

Frankie Williams (born March 28, 1993) is an American former professional football player who was a cornerback and kick returner in the National Football League (NFL) and Canadian Football League (CFL). He played college football for the Purdue Boilermakers.

== College career ==
Williams played four seasons at the Purdue University, where he appeared in 48 games (38 starts) and totaled 227 tackles (163 solo), 5.5 tackles for loss, 1.5 sacks, 36 passes defensed, 10 interceptions (one returned for a touchdown) one forced fumble and two fumble recoveries. He redshirted as a freshman with the Boilermakers in 2011, then in 2012, he participated in all 13 games (five starts) and registered 45 tackles (36 solo), 1.0 tackle for loss, two interceptions and 11 passes defensed. He saw action in all 12 games (11 starts) in 2013 and finished with 61 tackles (46 solo), 2.0 tackles for loss, two interceptions and five passes defensed. In 2014, he started all 11 games he played and earned 74 tackles (51 solo), 1.5 tackles for loss, 1.0 sack, one fumble recovery, 10 passes defensed and three interceptions (one returned for a touchdown). As a redshirt senior in 2015, he appeared in 12 games (11 starts) and compiled 47 tackles (30 solo), 1.0 tackle for loss, half a sack, one forced fumble, one fumble recovery, 10 passes defensed and three interceptions.

=== College statistics ===
Purdue Boilermakers
Season	Tackles						Interceptions				
Season	Solo	Ast	Total	Loss	Sacks	FF	Int	Yards	Avg	TD	PD
2012	36	9	45	1.0	0.0	0	2	33	16.5	0	0
2013	46	15	61	2.0	0.0	0	2	0	0.0	0	3
2014	51	23	74	1.5	1.0	0	3	119	39.7	0	7
2015	30	17	47	1.0	0.5	1	3	46	15.3	0	7
Career	163	64	227	5.5	1.5	1	10	198	19.8	0	17

== Professional career ==
=== Indianapolis Colts ===
Williams was signed by the Indianapolis Colts on May 7, 2016 as an undrafted free agent. He was waived on September 5, 2016 as part of final roster cuts and was signed to the practice squad the next day. He was promoted to the active roster on October 13, 2016. He was released on October 17, 2016 and re-signed to the practice squad the next day. He was promoted to the active roster on November 1, 2016. He was placed on the Reserve/Non-Football Injury list on November 23, 2016.

On May 15, 2017, Williams was waived/injured by the Colts and placed on injured reserve. He was waived from injured reserve on May 22, 2017 with an injury settlement.

=== Hamilton Tiger-Cats ===
On February 6, 2018, Williams signed with the Hamilton Tiger-Cats of the CFL. He re-signed with the Tiger-Cats on January 30, 2021.
