= Jake Wieneke =

American gridiron football player (born 1994)

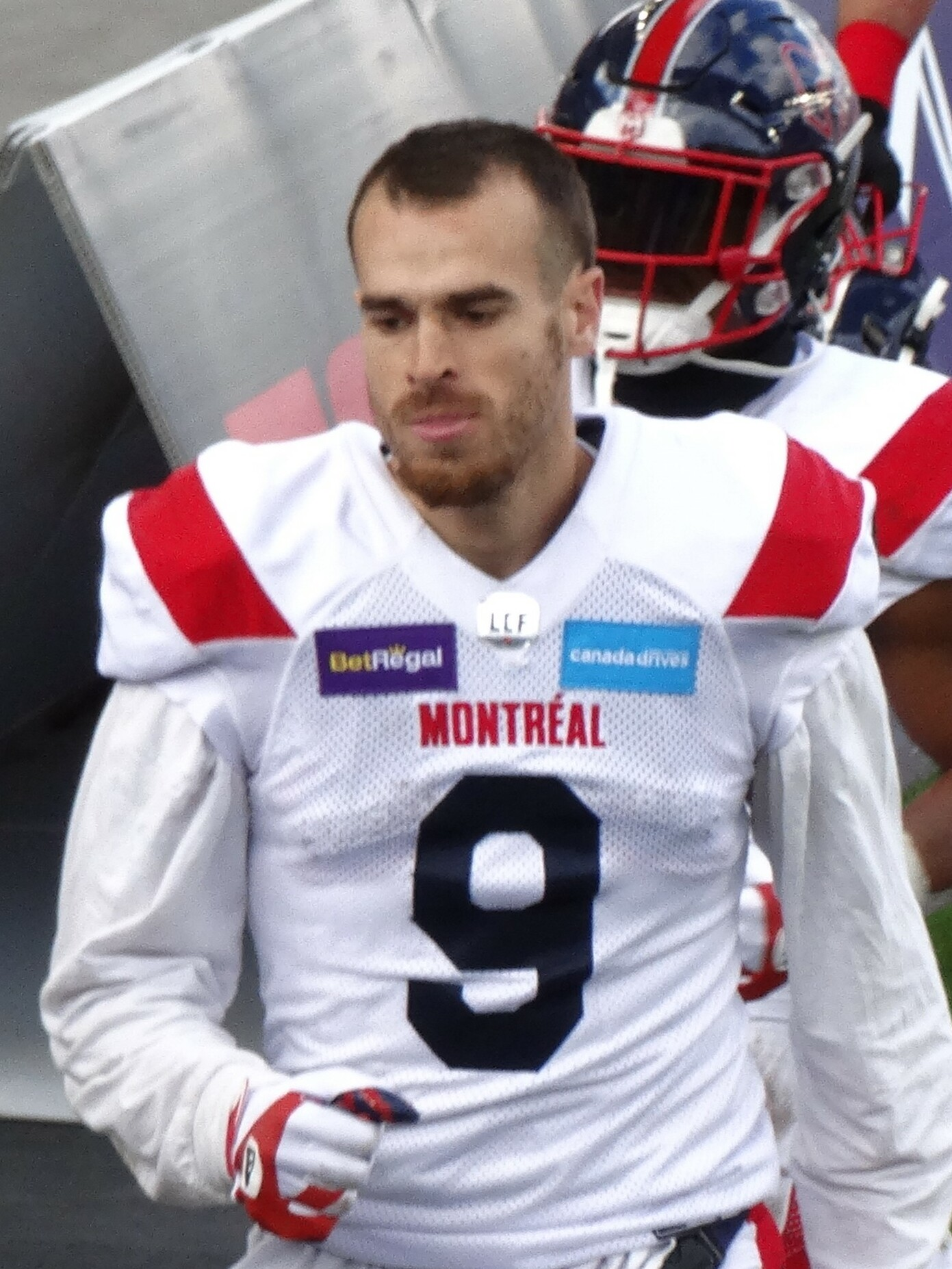
- Wieneke with the Montreal Alouettes in 2022

Profile
- Position: Wide receiver

Personal information
- Born: September 14, 1994 (age 32); Maple Grove, Minnesota, U.S.
- Listed height: 6 ft 4 in (1.93 m)
- Listed weight: 221 lb (100 kg)

Career information
- High school: Maple Grove (Maple Grove, Minnesota)
- College: South Dakota State
- NFL draft: 2018: undrafted

Career history
- Minnesota Vikings (2018)*; Salt Lake Stallions (2019)*; Montreal Alouettes (2019–2022); Saskatchewan Roughriders (2023)
- * Offseason or practice squad member only

Awards and highlights
- CFL All-Star (2021); CFL East All-Star (2021); Frank M. Gibson Trophy (2019)
- Stats at CFL.ca

Jake Wieneke (born September 15, 1994) is an American professional football wide receiver. He played college football at South Dakota State and signed with the Minnesota Vikings as an undrafted free agent in 2018. He was cut by the Vikings prior to the 2018 season, and then signed by the Salt Lake Stallions of the Alliance of American Football (AAF). He played in the Canadian Football League (CFL) for five seasons, for the Montreal Alouettes from 2019 to 2022 and Saskatchewan Roughriders in 2023.

== Early life ==
Wieneke attended Maple Grove Senior High School, where he was a three-sport star in football, basketball and track and field. After dealing with injuries for the most part of his junior season, Wieneke established himself as one of the top wide receivers in the state of Minnesota during his senior season. He was a first-team All-State selection and Mr. Football finalist after recording 68 receptions for 1,330 yards and 13 touchdowns. Following his senior campaign, he was invited to play at the Minnesota All-Star Game held in June 2013 and was named the North Offensive MVP after catching two touchdown passes.

== College career ==
After redshirting in 2013, Wieneke was the runner-up for the Jerry Rice Award as the Football Championship Subdivision's top freshman the following year. He garnered second-team Associated Press (AP) All-American status and his first first-team All-Missouri Valley Football Conference (MVFC) nod after catching 73 passes for 1,404 yards and a school-record 16 touchdowns. Wieneke finished his collegiate career as the MVFC career leader in receptions with 288, in receiving yards with 5,157 and in receiving touchdowns with 59.

=== Statistics ===
Season	Team	Games	Receiving					Rushing					Passing						
Season	Team	GP	Rec	Yds	Avg	Lng	TD	Att	Yds	Avg	Lng	TD	Comp	Att	Yds	Pct.	TD	Int	Rtg
2014	South Dakota State Jackrabbits	14	73	1,404	19.2	91	16	1	52	52.0	52	0	0	0	0	0.0	0	0	0
2015	South Dakota State Jackrabbits	12	72	1,472	20.4	74	11	0	0	0.0	0	0	0	0	0	0.0	0	0	0
2016	South Dakota State Jackrabbits	13	78	1,316	16.9	52	16	0	0	0.0	0	0	0	0	0	0.0	0	0	0
2017	South Dakota State Jackrabbits	14	65	965	14.8	69	16	2	83	41.5	48	1	1	1	16	100.0	1	0	564.4
	Total	53	288	5,157	17.9	91	59	3	135	45.0	52	1	1	1	16	100.0	1	0	564.4

== Professional career ==
Pre-draft measurables
Height	Weight	Arm length	Hand span	40-yard dash	10-yard split	20-yard split	20-yard shuttle	Three-cone drill	Vertical jump	Broad jump	Bench press
6 ft 4 in (1.93 m)	221 lb (100 kg)	33 in (0.84 m)	9 7/8 in (0.25 m)	4.67 s	1.64 s	2.74 s	4.34 s	7.22 s	35 in (0.89 m)	9 ft 9 in (2.97 m)	13 reps
All values from Pro Day except 40-yard dash time from NFL Combine

=== Minnesota Vikings ===
As the 2018 NFL draft was coming to an end, Wieneke was hoping he would not be selected. With five picks to go, he received a call from the Minnesota Vikings' wide receivers coach Darrell Hazell asking if he wanted to sign as a free agent with Minnesota if not taken. "So for the last five picks of the draft, I was just kind of hoping that I don't get drafted and I get to sign with the Vikings," Wieneke said. When the draft ended, Wieneke agreed to terms with the Vikings. Wieneke stated: "It's the best feeling in the world, I get to stay with the team I grew up loving and I get to stay in Minnesota. It can't be anything better than this." He was waived on August 31, 2018.

=== Salt Lake Stallions ===
Wieneke signed with the Salt Lake Stallions of the Alliance of American Football, but was released in January 2019.

=== Montreal Alouettes ===
On January 4, 2019, Wieneke signed with the Montreal Alouettes. He played in all 18 regular season games in 2019 where he recorded 41 receptions for 569 yards and eight touchdowns. At the end of the year, he was awarded the Frank M. Gibson Trophy as the East Division's Most Outstanding Rookie. He did not play in 2020 due to the cancellation of the 2020 CFL season. He signed a one-year contract extension with the Alouettes on January 19, 2021.

In 2021, Wieneke played in all 14 regular season games where he had 56 catches for 898 yards and a league-leading 11 touchdowns. At the end of the season, he was named a CFL All-Star.

In his third season with the team, Weineke saw a drop in production as he played in 16 regular season games, but had 45 receptions for 589 yards and just two touchdowns. He also didn't record more than 70 receiving yards in a game until the penultimate regular season game where he had five catches for 121 yards and a touchdown. In the playoffs, he had nine catches for 107 yards and one touchdown in two games. He became a free agent upon the expiry of his contract on February 14, 2023.

=== Saskatchewan Roughriders ===
On February 14, 2023, it was announced that Weineke had signed with the Saskatchewan Roughriders. He was released on January 18, 2024.

== Personal life ==
Wieneke was born to parents Susan and Eric Wieneke, who attended all 18 Alouettes regular season games and one playoff game in 2019. Wieneke and his wife, Brenda, have one son, who was born in 2020. Wieneke also has a brother, Clark.

Wieneke now serves as a Catholic Missionary with FOCUS (Fellowship of Catholic University Students) in Lincoln, Nebraska.
