= Reggie Begelton =

American gridiron football player (born 1993)

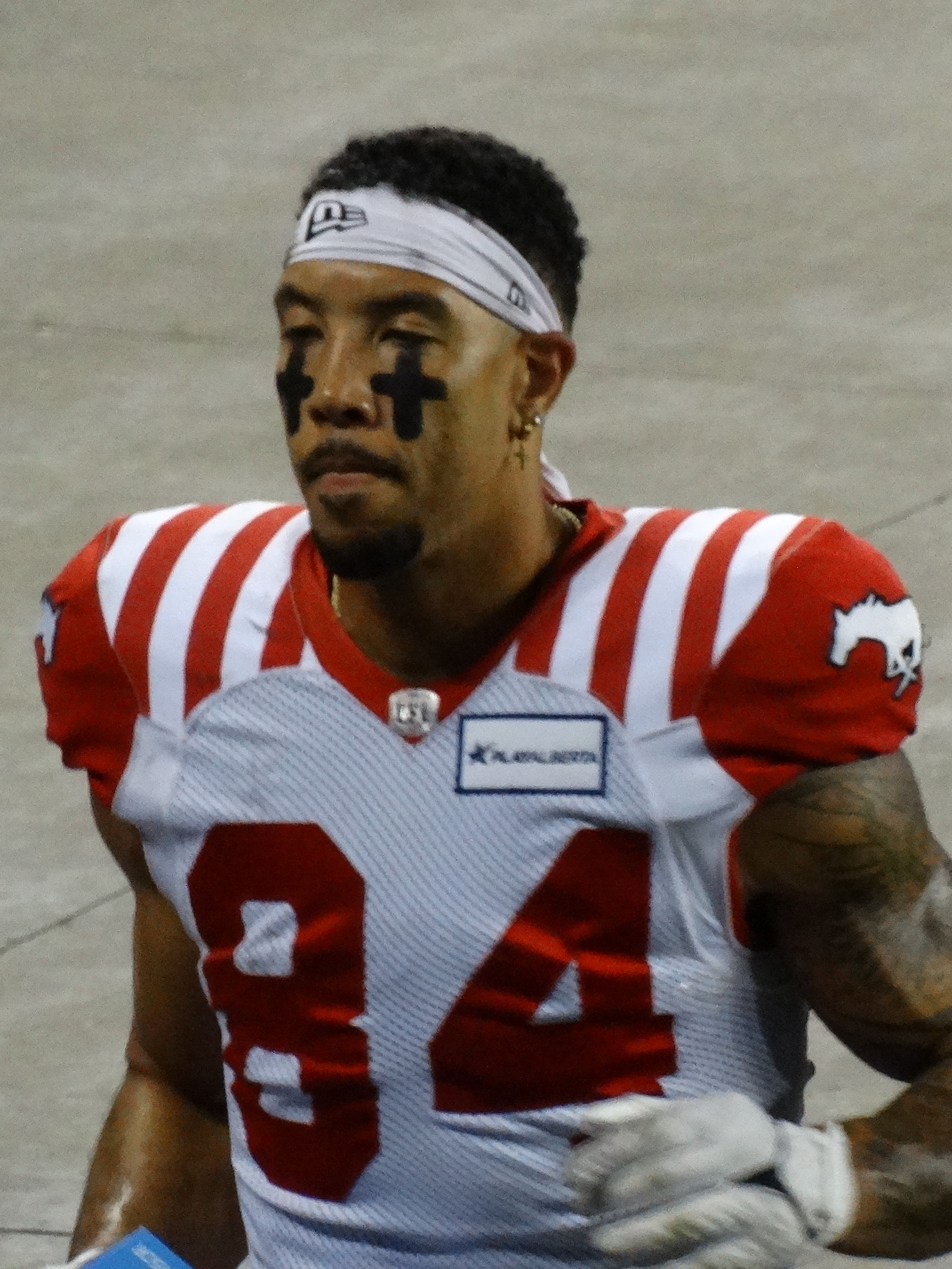
- Begelton with the Calgary Stampeders in 2023

No. 84 – Calgary Stampeders
- Position: Wide receiver
- Roster status: 6-game injured list
- CFL status: American

Personal information
- Born: August 31, 1993 (age 33); Beaumont, Texas, U.S.
- Listed height: 6 ft 1 in (1.85 m)
- Listed weight: 205 lb (93 kg)

Career information
- High school: West Brook (Beaumont)
- College: Lamar
- NFL draft: 2016: undrafted

Career history
- Calgary Stampeders (2017–2019); Green Bay Packers (2020–2021); Calgary Stampeders (2021–present)

Awards and highlights
- Grey Cup champion (2018); 3× CFL All-Star (2019, 2023, 2024); 3× CFL West All-Star (2019, 2023, 2024)

Career NFL statistics
- Games played: 1
- Stats at Pro Football Reference

Career CFL statistics as of 2026
- Games played: 93
- Receptions: 433
- Receiving yards: 5,729
- Touchdowns: 28
- Stats at CFL.ca

Reggie Begelton (born August 31, 1993) is an American professional football wide receiver for the Calgary Stampeders of the Canadian Football League (CFL). He played college football at Lamar. He has also played for the Green Bay Packers of the National Football League (NFL):

== College career ==
He played college football for the Lamar Cardinals. Begelton finished his college career with 227 receptions for 2435 yards and 20 touchdowns.

== Professional career ==
Pre-draft measurables
Height	Weight
6 ft 1 1/8 in (1.86 m)	200 lb (91 kg)
Values from Pro Day

=== Calgary Stampeders (first stint) ===
Begelton was originally signed by the Calgary Stampeders on May 17, 2017, but was released at the end of training camp on June 17. He was re-signed to the team the following day. He played in nine games for the Stampeders in 2017, catching 22 passes for 304 yards with one touchdown. Begelton played the first seven games of the season in his second year, before suffering a broken arm which caused him to miss the remainder of the season In those seven games, he caught 25 passes for 488 yards and one touchdown; the Stampeders went on to win the 106th Grey Cup.

In 2019, he was the unanimous selection for the Calgary Stampeders' Most Outstanding Player.

=== Green Bay Packers ===
On January 6, 2020, Begelton signed a reserve/future contract with the Green Bay Packers of the NFL. He was waived on September 5, 2020, and was signed to the practice squad the next day. On October 5, Begelton was promoted to the active roster. After making his NFL debut against the Atlanta Falcons, Begelton was waived by the Packers on October 6 and re-signed to the practice squad two days later. On January 26, 2021, Begelton signed a reserves/futures contract with the Packers. On August 31, 2021, Packers released Begelton as part of their final roster cuts at the end of the 2021 preseason.

=== Calgary Stampeders (second stint) ===
On November 1, 2021, Begelton re-signed with the Stampeders. Begelton played in two games to close out the 2021 regular season and also the team's lone playoff game in which he caught seven passes for 105 yards. The following season Begelton played his first full 18-game season in the CFL and caught 85 passes for 957 yards with six touchdowns. On December 8, 2022 Begelton and the Stampeders agreed to a new two-year contract extension. On June 23, 2023, he was placed on the six-game injured list before the team's Week 3 match against the Saskatchewan Roughriders. He suffered a rib injury during Calgary's Week 2 game and it required a minor procedure to fix.
