= Joe Mack (gridiron football) =

American football scout and executive (born 1954)

Personal information
- Born: March 22, 1954 (age 72); Levittown, Pennsylvania, U.S.

Career information
- College: Villanova

Career history

Playing
- 1974–1977: Villanova

Coaching
- 1978–1980: Villanova (DL/ST)

Operations
- 1984–1987: Winnipeg Blue Bombers (Director of Player Personnel)
- 1987–1989: Atlanta Falcons (Pro scout)
- 1989–1994: Washington Redskins (Director of Pro Scouting)
- 1994–1997: Carolina Panthers (Asst. GM)
- 1998–2000: Cleveland Browns (Director of Player Personnel)
- 2001: New York/New Jersey Hitmen (Director of Football Operations)
- 2010–2013: Winnipeg Blue Bombers (GM/VP of Football Operations)
- 2017–2019: Montreal Alouettes (Assistant GM of Player Personnel)

Awards and highlights
- Grey Cup champion (1984); Super Bowl champion (XXVI)

Joe Mack (born March 22, 1954) is an American football scout and executive. He has worked for several National Football League (NFL) organizations and was the general manager and vice-president of football operations for the Winnipeg Blue Bombers of the Canadian Football League (CFL) from 2010 to 2013.

== Early life and playing career ==
Mack was born on March 22, 1954, in Levittown, Pennsylvania, to Bernard and Theresa Mack. He played linebacker and nose tackle for the Villanova Wildcats. During his senior year, he was a team captain and earned all-star honors. He graduated in 1977 with a degree in political science, specializing in international relations.

== Career ==
After graduating, Mack became Villanova's defensive line and special teams coach. He then spent three years as a scout for BLESTO Scouting Combine, which represented the Pittsburgh Steelers, Philadelphia Eagles, Detroit Lions, Chicago Bears, Indianapolis Colts, Minnesota Vikings, and Miami Dolphins.

Mack's first experience in the CFL came in 1984 as the director of player personnel for the Blue Bombers. During his tenure in Winnipeg he supplied players for head coaches Cal Murphy and Mike Riley. The Blue Bombers won their first Grey Cup in 22 years in 1984 and had an overall record of 46-21-1 during Mack's tenure there.

Mack left Winnipeg in 1987 to become a pro scout for the NFL's Atlanta Falcons. Two years later, he moved to the Washington Redskins to become the team's director of pro scouting and was a member of the Redskins front office when the team won Super Bowl XXVI. After five years in Washington, Mack spent four seasons with the expansion Carolina Panthers as assistant general manager, before becoming the interim director of player personnel for the Cleveland Browns. He helped build another expansion team in 2001 as the director of football operations for the XFL's New York/New Jersey Hitmen. After the 2001 season, Mack left professional football to spend more time with his family and worked as an independent football consultant.

Mack returned to full-time professional football in 2010 when he was hired by the Winnipeg Blue Bombers as general manager and vice-president of football operations. Even with a Grey Cup appearance in 2011, the Blue Bombers struggled during Mack's tenure, posting a 21–39 record. Mack was fired by the Blue Bombers in August 2013, midway into his fourth season as general manager.

On January 25, 2017, Mack was unveiled as the assistant general manager of player personnel with the Montreal Alouettes. Following the dismissal of general manager Kavis Reed on July 14, 2019, the Alouettes expanded Mack's role alongside head coach Khari Jones and director of football operations Patrick Donovan to fill the responsibilities left by the vacant general manager position.

== CFL GM record ==
Team	Year	Regular season					Postseason		
Team	Year	Won	Lost	Ties	Win %	Finish	Won	Lost	Result
WPG	2010	4	14	0	.222	4th in East Division	–	–	Missed playoffs
WPG	2011	10	8	0	.556	1st in East Division	1	1	Lost in Grey Cup
WPG	2012	6	12	0	.333	3rd in East Division	–	–	Missed playoffs
WPG	2013	1	5	0	.167	4th in East Division	–	–	Fired Mid-Season
MTL	2019	8	6	0	.571	2nd in East Division	0	1	Lost in East Semi-Final
Total		29	45	0	.392	1 Division Championship	1	2	0 Grey Cups
