= Asnnel Robo =

French Guianese gridiron football player (born 1993)

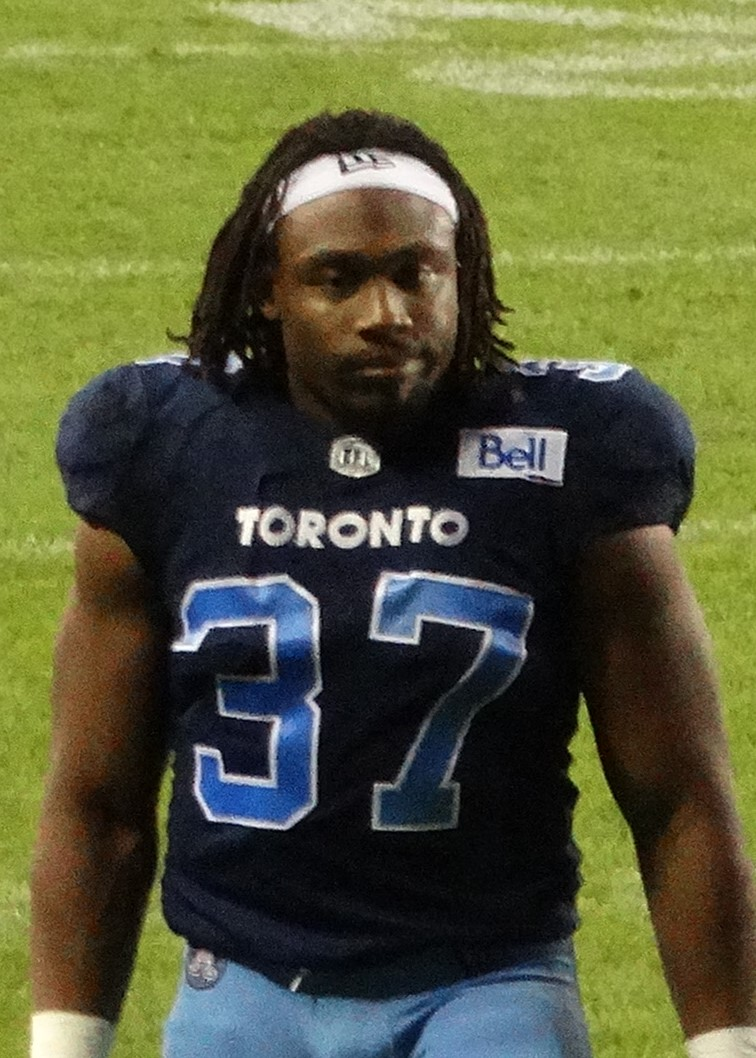
- Robo with the Argonauts in 2021

Stuttgart Surge
- Position: Fullback
- Roster status: Active
- CFL status: Global

Personal information
- Born: November 4, 1993 (age 33); Cayenne, French Guiana
- Listed height: 5 ft 7 in (1.70 m)
- Listed weight: 217 lb (98 kg)

Career information
- University: Montreal
- CFL draft: 2019 Euro: 1st round, 3rd overall pick

Career history
- 2019: Montreal Alouettes*
- 2019–2020: Calgary Stampeders
- 2021: Toronto Argonauts
- 2023–present: Stuttgart Surge
- * Offseason or practice squad member only
- Stats at CFL.ca

Asnnel Robo (born November 4, 1993) is a professional gridiron football fullback for the Stuttgart Surge of the European League of Football.

== Early life ==
Robo was born in Cayenne, French Guiana and later moved to France. After playing soccer in his youth, he began playing gridiron football when he was 18 years old while he was studying in Marseille.

== University career ==
After moving to Canada, Robo played U Sports football as a running back for the Montreal Carabins from 2015 to 2018. Over his four year career, he had 677 rushing yards and six touchdowns, including 145 rushing yards in a single game against Concordia in his senior year.

== Professional career ==
Pre-draft measurables
Height	Weight	40-yard dash	20-yard shuttle	Three-cone drill	Vertical jump	Broad jump	Bench press
5 ft 7 3/8 in (1.71 m)	217 lb (98 kg)	4.59 s	4.57 s	7.59 s	33.5 in (0.85 m)	9 ft 2 1/2 in (2.81 m)	17 reps
All values from CFL Combine

=== Montreal Alouettes ===
Robo qualified for the Canadian Football League's first ever Global Draft in 2019 as the league wanted to expand its international reach. He was then drafted third overall by the Montreal Alouettes and signed with the team on May 15, 2019. However, he was released at the end of training camp on June 9, 2019.

=== Calgary Stampeders ===
On June 11, 2019, Robo was signed by the Calgary Stampeders to their practice roster. He played in his first career game against the Edmonton Eskimos on September 2, 2019, in the Labour Day Classic. He played in two more games that year, but did not record any statistics.

Robo was re-signed by the Stampeders in the following off-season on November 26, 2019. However, he did not play in 2020 due to the cancellation of the 2020 CFL season and was released on February 3, 2021.

=== Toronto Argonauts ===
Shortly after his release from the Stampeders, it was announced on February 6, 2021, that Robo had signed with the Toronto Argonauts. He played in 12 regular season games where he had three special teams tackles. He spent part of 2022 training camp with the team, but was released after the first pre-season game on May 29, 2022.

=== Stuttgart Surge ===
In 2022, Robo joined the Stuttgart Surge for the European League of Football 2023 season.
