= 2019 CFL European draft =

Canadian football draft

General information
- Sport: Canadian football
- Date: April 11, 2019
- Time: 1:00 pm ET

Overview
- 9 total selections
- League: Canadian Football League
- U Sports selections: 4

The 2019 CFL European draft took place on April 11, 2019. Nine players were chosen from a pool of 18 European players who attended the 2019 CFL Combine.

== Background ==
In October 2018, Canadian Football League (CFL) commissioner Randy Ambrosie outlined a plan to grow the CFL's presence, which he dubbed CFL 2.0, including growth internationally. As part of this expansion the CFL held a special draft in January 2019 with the Liga de Fútbol Americano Profesional (LFA), the top-level pro American football league in Mexico. Players selected there were not signed to teams but rather had their rights held by their selecting teams. In March 2019, 18 players from teams in Italy, Germany, France, Finland, and Denmark attended the 2019 CFL Combine alongside Canadian players eligible for the normal CFL draft; all players came from top club leagues in Europe, with the exception of two French players coming from Canadian university football and one Italian player from American junior college football. Only those that attended the combine were eligible to be drafted in the CFL European draft. Players selected in these drafts filled a new classification of CFL players called "global players" (in contrast to "National" Canadian players and "International" players which mostly consist of Americans); Ambrosie was initially seeking for each CFL team to have two roster spots for these new global players but, after negotiations with the CFLPA, it formally decided on one roster spot and two practice roster spots.

== Selection order ==
Unlike the normal CFL draft, which sets selection order based on a team's record the previous season (similar to the NFL draft), the preceding CFL–LFA draft instead used a weighted lottery system where teams received an increased chance at a higher draft priority (similar to the NBA draft) but not a guarantee. Unlike either the 3-round CFL–LFA draft or the 8-round CFL draft, this draft only consisted of a single round. Similarly, the European draft also used a lottery system, with a draft order set on April 4.

== Selections ==
Pick #	CFL team	Player	Position	University/College	Club team	Nationality
1	Hamilton Tiger-Cats	Valentin Gnahoua	DL	McGill	(Germany) Berlin Rebels	France
2	Winnipeg Blue Bombers	Thiadric Hansen	LB	—	(Germany) Potsdam Royals	Germany
3	Montreal Alouettes	Asnnel Robo	RB	Montreal	—	France
4	Edmonton Eskimos	Maxime Rouyer	LB	McGill	—	France
5	Toronto Argonauts	Marc Hor	DL	(United States) Diablo Valley CC	(Germany) Frankfurt Universe	Germany
6	Saskatchewan Roughriders	Max Zimmermann	WR	—	(Germany) Potsdam Royals	Germany
7	BC Lions	Benjamin Plu	WR	McGill	(France) Thonon Black Panthers	France
8	Ottawa Redblacks	Jordan Bouah	WR	(United States) Saddleback CC	—	Italy
9	Calgary Stampeders	Roni Salonen	LB	—	(Germany) New Yorker Lions	Finland

== See also ==
- 2019 CFL draft
- 2019 CFL–LFA draft
