= CFC Prospect Game =

Annual Canadian all-star football game

The CFC Prospect Game is an annual Canadian football game featuring the top Canadian prospects in their sophomore or junior years of school. The game is played in May and has been broadcast on The Sports Network (TSN) since its inception.

== History ==
The CFC Prospect Game was founded in 2019 by the CEO of Canadafootballchat.com, Lee Barette. The first four editions of the game were played in Ottawa, Ontario. The game was moved in 2025 to Hamilton. The game is comparable to the Under Armour All-America Game and All-American Bowl (formerly U.S. Army Bowl) game in the United States. The game features the top 75 male high school players on track to qualify as a National in the Canadian Football League (CFL).

== Broadcasts ==
Since 2019, the game has been carried on The Sports Network (TSN); the event is broadcast on tape delay to a national audience in prime time.

== Locations ==
From 2019 to 2024 the game was played at TD Stadium, home of the Ottawa RedBlacks. In 2025, the game moved to Hamilton Stadium home of the Hamilton Tiger-Cats in Hamilton, Ontario, where it continues to be played.

== Game Results ==
Year	Stadium	Location	Result
2026	Hamilton Stadium	Hamilton, ON	Team Stegall 30 vs. Team LaPolice 12
2025	Hamilton Stadium	Hamilton, ON	Team Stegall 28 vs. Team Sanchez 27
2024	TD Place	Ottawa, ON	Team Sanchez 36 vs. Team Stegall 9
2023	TD Place	Ottawa, ON	Team Sanchez 24 vs. Team Stegall 12
2022	TD Place	Ottawa, ON	Team Sanchez 49 vs. Team Dunigan 24
2019	TD Place	Ottawa, ON	Team Burris 41 vs. Team Dunigan 24

=== Game MVPs ===
Year	Team	Position	Player
2019	Team Burris	WR	Sony Bermudez-Chavez
2019	Team Burris	RB	Matthew Morin
2019	Team Burris	LB	Tyson Krushelniski
2019	Team Burris	OL	Albert Reese IV
2019	Team Dunigan	RB	Ryker Frank
2019	Team Dunigan	QB	Samuel Tremblay
2019	Team Dunigan	LB	Nathan Carabatsakis
2019	Team Dunigan	DL	Cody McMahon
2022	Team Sanchez	WR	Nik Shewchuk
2022	Team Sanchez	LB	Antoine Deslauriers
2022	Team Sanchez	OL	Nathan Pahanich
2022	Team Dunigan	LB	Nevan Brown
2022	Team Dunigan	DL	Vincent Branauer
2022	Team Dunigan	OL	Logan Thiessen
2023	Team Sanchez	RB	Ethan Dahl
2023	Team Sanchez	QB	Will Russell
2023	Team Sanchez	DE	Kayden Roop
2023	Team Stegall	DB	Sadraque Zinga
2023	Team Stegall	WR	Antoine Goupil
2023	Team Stegall	DE	Jayden Arenas-Michel
2024	Team Sanchez	WR	Mikun Odunuga
2024	Team Sanchez	DE	Landon Dingee
2024	Team Stegall	DL	Breylon McCuller
2024	Team Stegall	DB	Jorel Sahay
2024	Team Stegall	QB	Justin Royer
2025	Team Sanchez	QB	Jacob Muller
2025	Team Sanchez	WR	Jason Dorel Onana
2025	Team Sanchez	LB	Logan Woolsey
2025	Team Stegall	QB	Brandon Bailey
2025	Team Stegall	WR	Ben McAuley
2025	Team Stegall	LB	Jake Mitchell
2026	Team Stegall	REC	Gabriel Tabora
2026	Team Stegall	DB	Alex Brousseau
2026	Team LaPo	REC	Stefan Ptaszek
2026	Team LaPo	LB	Cal Crawford

== Alumni ==
There have been athletes who have progressed to U SPORTS and NCAA Football pathways, and some have later pursued professional careers in the CFL and NFL.

=== NFL Alumni ===
OL - Albert Reese IV (Mississippi State - Carolina Panthers)

=== CFL Alumni / Draft Selections ===
Position	Player	University	CFL team
DL	Ty Anderson	Alberta	Hamilton Tiger-Cats
WR	Kolby Hurford	Alberta	Edmonton Elks
DL	Max von Muehldorfer	Western	Calgary Stampeders
OL	Gio Vaccaro	Purdue	Ottawa RedBlacks
DB	Malcolm Bell	Michigan State	Saskatchewan Roughriders
WR	Nolan Ulm	Eastern Washington	Toronto Argonauts
DL	Aamarii Notice	Coastal Carolina	Hamilton Tiger-Cats

=== NCAA Alumni ===
Position	Player	University
DL	Jayden Arenas-Michel	Middle Tennessee
LB	Antoine Deslauriers	Syracuse
OL	Elliott Demaine	Wake Forest
DB	Raphael Dunn	Wisconsin
DB	Rhyland Kelly	Minnesota
RB	Shekai Mills-Knight	Ole Miss
OL	Nathan Pahanich	Wake Forest
DB	Njita Sinkala	Boston College
OL	Everett Small	Rutgers
QB	Callum Wither	Maryland
LB	Nathan Carabatsakis	Robert Morris
OL	Zack Corrigan	Southeastern Louisiana
DL	Natale Frangione	Georgetown
DL	Owen Lock	Wagner
OL	Leif Magnuson	Cal Poly
QB	Nicholas Penuvchev	Bucknell
DL	Etison Pholo	Southeastern Louisiana
OL	Owen Richardson	Maine
OL	Joshua Schuetzmann	Rhode Island
DL	Colton Shaw	Southeastern Louisiana
OL	Will Smith	Fordham
OL	Noah Stanley	Maine
DB	Jeremiah Washington	Richmond
WR	Lucas Weir	Holy Cross
DL	Enzo Agostini	Harvard
RB	Hugo Djeumeni Kemeni	Yale
TE	Blaize Cameron	Columbia
OL	Alex Fletcher	Penn
DB	Jorel Sahay	Penn
