= 2019 CFL season =

Canadian Football League season

- Duration: June 13 – November 2, 2019
- East champions: Hamilton Tiger-Cats
- West champions: Winnipeg Blue Bombers

107th Grey Cup
- Date: November 24, 2019
- Venue: McMahon Stadium, Calgary
- Champions: Winnipeg Blue Bombers

CFL seasons
- ← 2018 2020 (cancelled) →

Locations of the active CFL teams West East

The 2019 CFL season was the 66th season of modern-day Canadian football. Officially, it was the 62nd Canadian Football League season. The regular season began on June 13 and concluded with the playing of the 107th Grey Cup in Calgary on November 24 —where the Winnipeg Blue Bombers defeated the Hamilton Tiger-Cats 33–12 to win their first Grey Cup since 1990.

== League business ==
=== International partnerships ===
In October 2018, the CFL began work on an initiative known as "CFL 2.0" to grow its revenues and broaden its international reach outside of Canada and the United States. This included establishing partnerships with other gridiron football leagues (including using them as a potential farm system for Canadian player development post-university), international combines, scouting international prospects to join Canadian university football programs, expansion of the international media presence of the league, as well as increased investments in amateur football programs in Canada.

On November 23, 2018, the CFL and the Professional American Football League of Mexico (LFA) signed a non-binding letter of intent on various partnerships, which included projects such as the possibility of hosting a regular season game in Mexico. On January 9, 2019, it was announced that the CFL and its franchises had committed to investing $4 million in supporting amateur football programs in Canada in 2019.

On January 31, the CFL and German Football League (GFL) signed an agreement to form a long-term strategic partnership. The partnership included the participation of German athletes at the 2019 CFL Combine. In February 2019, the CFL reached similar agreements with the Ligue Élite de Football Américain (France), the Austrian American Football Federation, the Federazione Italiana di American Football (Italy), and with football officials in Finland, Norway, Sweden and Denmark. In July, the league also partnered with the British American Football Association.

=== New collective bargaining agreement ===
The five-year agreement that was ratified between the CFL and CFL Players' Association in 2013 was set to expire just prior to the start of this season, on the first day of scheduled training camp, May 19. On May 15, the CFL and CFL Players' Association announced they had reached a tentative agreement on a new three-year collective bargaining agreement, which was ratified by players and approved by the league's Board of Governors a week later on May 22; four days before the first preseason game. The length of the agreement aligns with Bell Media's media rights to the league.

The main components of the CBA included:

==== Financial ====
- $50,000 increase in the team salary cap each season. For the 2019 season, the salary cap will be $5,250,000 (average of $114,130 per active roster spot)
- The minimum salary remained at $54,000 for the 2019 season, but will increase to $65,000 in 2020 and 2021
- Players receiving a 20% share of all future revenue tied to the CFL 2.0 initiative.
- The CFL will not be allowed to withhold bonus payments in the lead up to the expiration of the new CBA

==== Roster composition ====
- Each team has one global player designated roster spot starting in 2019, increasing to two slots in 2020
- Canadian quarterbacks now count towards the national roster ratio, otherwise the national-international ratio remained unchanged
- To protect veteran American players and build continuity - three of the starting American players have to have played for their current team for at least three seasons, or four seasons in the league for any team

==== Player safety ====
- Medical coverage for up to three years for injured players
- The number of padded practices in training camp was reduced from 10 in 2018, to five in 2019 and then down to only three in 2020

==== Other ====
- Work permits for American players are open, allowing them to seek employment in Canada during the off-season
- Pending free agents may talk with any team for nine days in advance of opening of free agency

=== Football operations cap ===
On June 5, 2018, it was reported that the CFL had approved a limit on football operations staff salaries and number of coaches and operations staff employed by each team. In this report, the number of coaches on each team would not exceed 11 and the number of other football operations staff may not exceed 17. The total compensation of those 28 staff members would be capped at $2,738,000. As of the 2018 CFL season, four teams had more than 11 coaches employed and would be directly impacted by these changes. Consequently, there was talk of a potential coaches union being formed to combat the unilateral decision.

On December 6, 2018, the league formally announced the cap regulations, with the total compensation of the combined 11 coaches and 14 other football operations staff being set at $2,588,000 for 2019 and 2020. Similar to the player salary cap, violations in excess of $100,000 would result in monetary fines and loss of draft picks. However, as teams adjust to the new rules for 2019, they may self-report violations to avoid personal fines and loss of draft picks.

=== Montreal Alouettes ownership ===
On May 31, Robert Wetenhall surrendered his ownership of the Montreal Alouettes back to the league, after having pursued a sale of the franchise for several months. The CFL intended to continue this process but would operate the team on its behalf.

=== New outfitter ===
On September 12, 2018, it was announced that New Era would be the official outfitter of all CFL teams beginning in the 2019 season. This came as a result of the previous supplier, Adidas, not renewing their contract following the 2018 expiry of their previous deal. New Era Cap had been a licensee of the CFL for headwear and apparel since January 2011, and it was the first time that the company provided football uniforms and sideline apparel.

While most teams maintained relatively similar uniforms, the Montreal Alouettes unveiled a revamped identity with new logos and uniforms on February 1, while the B.C. Lions returned to using their normal logo on their helmets rather than a stylized version.

== Player movement ==
=== International drafts ===
The CFL and LFA hosted a combine in Mexico City on January 13 attended by 51 top Mexican players. The following day, 27 players were selected in a CFL–LFA Draft; the Edmonton Eskimos held the first overall pick, and selected Diego Viamontes of Mayas CDMX.

On April 11, the CFL held its first European draft in which nine players were drafted, one to each CFL team: four of the players were from France, three from Germany, and one each from Italy and Finland.

=== Free agency ===
The free agency period began on February 12 at noon EST. All players eligible for free agency are unrestricted free agents, as is customary in the league. Notable signings in the period included:

Team	Top 30 Free Agents (CFL.ca rank)
BC Lions	Mike Reilly (1), Sukh Chungh (12), Bryan Burnham (13), Duron Carter (21), Aaron Grymes (26)
Calgary Stampeders	Bo Levi Mitchell (2), Eric Rogers (29)
Edmonton Eskimos	Trevor Harris (3), Kwaku Boateng (11), Greg Ellingson (14), Don Unamba (16), SirVincent Rogers (23), Jovan Santos-Knox (24), Larry Dean (25)
Hamilton Tiger-Cats	Delvin Breaux (6), Brandon Banks (7), Ja’Gared Davis (9)
Montreal Alouettes	Taylor Loffler (17), B.J. Cunningham (19), DeVier Posey (22)
Ottawa Redblacks	Jonathan Rose (15), Jason Lauzon-Seguin (18), Jonathon Jennings (20)
Toronto Argonauts	Derel Walker (10), Micah Awe (27), Shawn Lemon (30)
Saskatchewan Roughriders	Micah Johnson (4), William Powell (28)
Winnipeg Blue Bombers	Willie Jefferson (5)

=== Trade deadline ===
The in-season trade deadline was on October 9 at 3:59 pm EDT.

=== Johnny Manziel ===
On February 27, Johnny Manziel, a quarterback for the Montreal Alouettes in 2018, was permanently banned from playing on any CFL team as a result of what the Alouettes called an unspecified "(contravention of) the agreement which made him eligible to play." Manziel has denied any wrongdoing but accepted the banishment, stating he would consider playing options in the United States; he then signed on with the Alliance of American Football who were partly through their inaugural season.

== Coaching changes ==
Team	2018 HC	2019 HC	Notes
Toronto Argonauts	Marc Trestman	Corey Chamblin	On November 3, 2018, the day after the last regular season game, the Argonauts announced they had parted ways with Marc Trestman. Trestman had led the Argos to a Grey Cup victory the previous year, but was unable to duplicate his success in 2018, winning only four games in the regular season, finishing at the bottom of the East Division standings. On December 10, 2018, the Argos announced Corey Chamblin as the team's 44th head coach. Chamblin had served as the Argos' defensive coordinator, defensive backs coach, and assistant head coach for the 2017 season. Previously Chamblin was the head coach of the Saskatchewan Roughriders for 3 1/2 seasons from 2012 to 2015 (29 wins, 34 losses), winning the Grey Cup in 2013.
BC Lions	Wally Buono	DeVone Claybrooks	On November 13, 2018, the Lions held a press conference in which Wally Buono formally retired as head coach of the BC Lions. Buono had been the head coach of the BC Lions for 12 seasons between 2003 and 2018, winning the Grey Cup twice. He was also the head coach of the Calgary Stampeders from 1990 through 2002, leading the Stamps to three Grey Cup victories. Buono retired as the CFL's all-time leader in most wins by a head coach with 282. On December 11, 2018, the Lions announced DeVone Claybrooks as their new head coach. Claybrooks began his coaching career in 2012 with the Stampeders as a defensive linemen coach, and was promoted to defensive coordinator in 2016. During his time coaching with the Stampeders he won two Grey Cups.
Hamilton Tiger-Cats	June Jones	Orlondo Steinauer	On December 3, 2018, the Tiger-Cats announced that Orlondo Steinauer would become the team's head coach. Steinauer had been Hamilton's defensive coordinator from 2013 to 2016, he then spent a year in the NCAA as the defensive coordinator for Fresno State, before returning to Hamilton as the team's assistant head coach for the 2018 season. Jones, after initially agreeing to stay on as associate head coach and offensive coordinator, left the Tiger-Cats in May 2019 to take over coaching the Houston Roughnecks; he accrued a 14–14 record with the Tiger-Cats.
Saskatchewan Roughriders	Chris Jones	Craig Dickenson	On January 15, Jones resigned as the head coach of the Roughriders and later that day accepted a job as a defensive coach for the Cleveland Browns of the NFL. Jones was the head coach of the Riders for three seasons, winning 27 games, and losing 27. On January 25, special teams coordinator Craig Dickenson was promoted to head coach.
Montreal Alouettes	Mike Sherman	Khari Jones	On June 8, less than a week before the start of the season and roughly a week after the team's owner surrendered the franchise back to the CFL, the Montreal Alouettes announced that Sherman had departed from his post in an ambiguously worded statement that claimed the two parties had "agreed to part ways." Sherman coached the Alouettes for only one season, winning 5 games and losing 13. Offensive coordinator Khari Jones was announced as the new head coach. Like Sherman, Jones joined the Alouettes before the start of their 2018 season. This was Jones' first time holding the office of head coach, having been an offensive coordinator for two other CFL teams.

== Rule changes ==
In March, the CFL's Rules Committee submitted a variety of rule changes to the Board of Governors, to be implemented for the 2019 season. As had been the case in previous years the proposed changes once again focused on improving game flow and increasing player safety. The proposals were reviewed and accepted by the CFL's Board of Governors on April 10.

- Allowing the Command Centre to assist referees with called and non-called roughing-the-passer infractions including instances where an obvious roughing-the-passer infraction was not called because a referee's view was blocked.
- The ability for the Command Centre to upgrade a 15-yard roughing-the-passer penalty to a 25-yard penalty for a direct blow to the quarterback's head or neck with the helmet when that player has a clear view to the quarterback, and there are no mitigating circumstances such as a quarterback ducking his head.
- Allowing the Command Centre to assist on-field officials in calling penalties when the injury spotter has intervened in a player safety situation.
- Allowing the Command Centre to assist on-field officials with called and non-called roughing-the-kicker infractions.
- Removing the stipulation that allows a defender to contact a kicker's plant leg without penalty if the defender has touched the ball prior to contact.
- Clarifying the definition of spearing to be when a player uses the top of their helmet as the primary point of contact to deliver a blow to an opponent.
- Making the use of three or more wedge blockers on kicking plays illegal.
- Making it illegal for a defensive player to deliver a forcible blow to the long snapper while the snapper's head is down and they are in a vulnerable position and unable to protect themselves.
- Whistling a play dead any time a quarterback carrying the ball gives themselves up by sliding with any part of their body. Previously, a quarterback could only "give themselves up" by sliding feet-first.
- Coaches are entitled to a second challenge if their first is successful, giving them a potential maximum of two per game instead of just one.
- A 10-yard objectionable-conduct penalty assessed for faking or embellishing contact, otherwise known as diving.
- Spearing on any player upgraded to a 25-yard penalty by the Command Centre when a spear is delivered to the head or neck, the player has a clear view to the opponent and there are no mitigating circumstances such as the player ducking into what would otherwise be legal contact.
- If a player receives two 25-yard penalties in the same game, they are disqualified from that game.
- A kicked or thrown football remains a live ball instead of becoming a dead ball when it touches a goal-post ribbon.

== Regular season ==
=== Schedule ===
The regular season schedule was announced on December 20, 2018, and was played over 21 weeks from June 13 to November 12, 2019. There was an increase in Saturday primetime games with 7:00 p.m. ET kickoffs, appearing in all but one week of the season. Only three games were played on Sundays, and three were played on Mondays.

Highlights of the schedule included:

- The season opener featured the Hamilton Tiger-Cats hosting the Saskatchewan Roughriders, with Hamilton winning 27–13. A rematch of the 106th Grey Cup also occurred in week 1, with the Calgary Stampeders hosting the Ottawa Redblacks.
- Canada Day game: The Roughriders hosted the Toronto Argonauts on July 1, winning 32–7.
- Touchdown Atlantic: On August 25, the CFL played a regular season game in the Maritimes for the first time since 2013, featuring the Montreal Alouettes and Toronto Argonauts. The game was presented by Schooners Sports and Entertainment (SSE), the group that is attempting to be awarded an expansion franchise as the Atlantic Schooners. The location of the game was narrowed down three choices: Halifax, Moncton, and Antigonish, Nova Scotia. Although SSE was expected to announce the location of the game before the end of January 2019, the announcement was not made until the end of March, at which time Croix-Bleue Medavie Stadium (Université de Moncton) in Moncton was selected.
- Labour Day Classic: Three traditional rivalry games were played over Labour Day weekend, including the Saskatchewan Roughriders hosting the Winnipeg Blue Bombers, the Hamilton Tiger-Cats hosting the Toronto Argonauts, and the Calgary Stampeders hosting the Edmonton Eskimos.

For the first time in league history, no games were played on Thanksgiving.

In the late evening of August 9 at 9:06 pm EDT, a weather delay was declared at Percival Molson Memorial Stadium in Montreal due to an approaching thunderstorm with intense lightning; the Saskatchewan Roughriders were leading the Alouettes 17–10 with 2:41 left in the 3rd quarter. Because the game had not restarted by 10:06 pm EDT and over 7:30 had been played in the 3rd at that point, the 17–10 score was declared final.

=== Standings ===
Teams in bold are in playoff positions.

West Division
Team	GP	W	L	T	Pts	PF	PA	Div	Stk	
**Saskatchewan Roughriders**	18	13	5	0	26	487	386	7–3	W3	Details
**Calgary Stampeders**	18	12	6	0	24	482	407	8–2	W1	Details
**Winnipeg Blue Bombers**	18	11	7	0	22	508	409	7–3	W1	Details
**Edmonton Eskimos**	18	8	10	0	16	406	400	3–7	L2	Details
BC Lions	18	5	13	0	10	411	452	0–10	L3	Details

East Division
Team	GP	W	L	T	Pts	PF	PA	Div	Stk	
**Hamilton Tiger-Cats**	18	15	3	0	30	551	344	7–1	W6	Details
**Montreal Alouettes**	18	10	8	0	20	479	485	5–3	W1	Details
Toronto Argonauts	18	4	14	0	8	373	562	3–5	L1	Details
Ottawa Redblacks	18	3	15	0	6	312	564	1–7	L11	Details

=== Results ===
Team	Week																				
Team	1	2	3	4	5	6	7	8	9	10	11	12	13	14	15	16	17	18	19	20	21
BC Lions	WPG	EDM	CGY	TOR	EDM	SSK	SSK	Bye	HAM	WPG	HAM	Bye	MTL	OTT	OTT	MTL	TOR	EDM	SSK	Bye	CGY
BC Lions	23–33	23–39	32–36	18–17	6–33	25–38	18–45	Bye	34–35	16–32	10–13	Bye	16–21	29–5	40–7	25–23	55–8	6–19	19–27	Bye	16–21
Calgary Stampeders	OTT	Bye	BC	SSK	HAM	TOR	OTT	EDM	WPG	MTL	Bye	EDM	EDM	HAM	TOR	Bye	MTL	SSK	WPG	WPG	BC
Calgary Stampeders	28–32	Bye	36–32	37–10	23–30	26–16	17–16	24–18	24–26	34–40 (2OT)	Bye	25–9	33–17	19–18	23–16	Bye	17–21	30–28	37–33	28–29	21–16
Edmonton Eskimos	MTL	BC	WPG	Bye	BC	MTL	TOR	CGY	OTT	TOR	WPG	CGY	CGY	Bye	HAM	OTT	HAM	BC	Bye	SSK	SSK
Edmonton Eskimos	32–25	39–23	21–28	Bye	33–6	10–20	26–0	18–24	16–12	41–26	28–34	9–25	17–33	Bye	27–30	21–16	12–41	19–6	Bye	24–27	13–23
Hamilton Tiger-Cats	SSK	TOR	MTL	MTL	CGY	Bye	WPG	SSK	BC	OTT	BC	TOR	Bye	CGY	EDM	WPG	EDM	Bye	OTT	MTL	TOR
Hamilton Tiger-Cats	23–17	64–14	41–10	29–36	30–23	Bye	23–15	19–24	35–34	21–7	13–10	38–27	Bye	18–19	30–27	33–13	41–12	Bye	33–12	38–26	21–18
Montreal Alouettes	EDM	Bye	HAM	HAM	OTT	EDM	Bye	OTT	SSK	CGY	TOR	Bye	BC	SSK	WPG	BC	CGY	WPG	TOR	HAM	OTT
Montreal Alouettes	25–32	Bye	10–41	36–29	36–19	20–10	Bye	27–30 (OT)	10–17	40–34 (2OT)	28–22	Bye	21–16	25–27	38–37	23–25	21–17	24–35	27–24	26–38	42–32
Ottawa Redblacks	CGY	SSK	Bye	WPG	MTL	WPG	CGY	MTL	EDM	HAM	SSK	Bye	TOR	BC	BC	EDM	Bye	TOR	HAM	TOR	MTL
Ottawa Redblacks	32–28	44–41	Bye	14–29	19–36	1–31	16–17	30–27 (OT)	12–16	7–21	18–40	Bye	17–46	5–29	7–40	16–21	Bye	21–28	12–33	9–39	32–42
Saskatchewan Roughriders	HAM	OTT	TOR	CGY	Bye	BC	BC	HAM	MTL	Bye	OTT	WPG	WPG	MTL	Bye	TOR	WPG	CGY	BC	EDM	EDM
Saskatchewan Roughriders	17–23	41–44	32–7	10–37	Bye	38–25	45–18	24–19	17–10	Bye	40–18	19–17	10–35	27–25	Bye	41–16	21–6	28–30	27–19	27–24	23–13
Toronto Argonauts	Bye	HAM	SSK	BC	WPG	CGY	EDM	WPG	Bye	EDM	MTL	HAM	OTT	Bye	CGY	SSK	BC	OTT	MTL	OTT	HAM
Toronto Argonauts	Bye	14–64	7–32	17–18	21–48	16–26	0–26	28–27	Bye	26–41	22–28	27–38	46–17	Bye	16–23	16–41	8–55	28–21	24–27	39–9	18–21
Winnipeg Blue Bombers	BC	Bye	EDM	OTT	TOR	OTT	HAM	TOR	CGY	BC	EDM	SSK	SSK	Bye	MTL	HAM	SSK	MTL	CGY	CGY	Bye
Winnipeg Blue Bombers	33–23	Bye	28–21	29–14	48–21	31–1	15–23	27–28	26–24	32–16	34–28	17–19	35–10	Bye	37–38	13–33	6–21	35–24	33–37	29–28	Bye
Home • Away • Win • Loss • Tie

=== Attendance ===
2019 CFL Attendance
Team	Home Avg.	% of Capacity	League Avg. Diff.
BC	17,803.2	64.74%	−5,113.6
Calgary	27,027.0	75.81%	+4,110.2
Edmonton	29,340.9	52.76%	+6,424.1
Hamilton	23,270.6	95.76%	+353.7
Montreal	17,574.0	87.76%	−5,342.8
Ottawa	22,605.0	91.68%	−311.8
Saskatchewan	30,723.4	92.12%	+7,806.6
Toronto	12,493.1	47.50%	−10,423.7
Winnipeg	25,414.2	76.96%	+2,497.4
League average	22,916.8	73.55%	N/A

== CFL Playoffs ==
The Grey Cup was played at McMahon Stadium in Calgary, Alberta, on November 24. The Winnipeg Blue Bombers won their first Grey Cup championship in 29 years, ending the longest current championship drought in the Canadian Football League. Winnipeg native, Andrew Harris was named both the Grey Cup Most Valuable Player and Grey Cup Most Valuable Canadian. This was the first time that a player won both awards in the Grey Cup championship.

=== Playoff bracket ===
November 10: Division Semi-Finals
East
E2	Montreal Alouettes	29
W4	Edmonton Eskimos	37
West
W2	Calgary Stampeders	14
W3	Winnipeg Blue Bombers	35

November 17: Division Finals
E1	Hamilton Tiger-Cats	36
W4	Edmonton Eskimos	16
W1	Saskatchewan Roughriders	13
W3	Winnipeg Blue Bombers	20

November 24: 107th Grey Cup; McMahon Stadium – Calgary
E1	Hamilton Tiger-Cats	12
W3	Winnipeg Blue Bombers	33

== Award winners ==
=== CFL Top Performers of the Week ===
Week	First	Second	Third	Fans' Choice
One	Trevor Harris	C.J. Gable	Andrew Harris	Andrew Harris
Two	Greg Ellingson	Dominique Davis	Sean Thomas Erlington	Sean Thomas Erlington
Three	Cody Fajardo	Eric Rogers	Ja'Gared Davis	Cody Fajardo
Four	William Stanback	Tre Roberson	Mike Miller	Mike Miller
Five	Brandon Banks	Vernon Adams Jr.	Andrew Harris	Andrew Harris
Six	Charleston Hughes	Matt Nichols	Shaq Evans	Matt Nichols
Seven	William Powell	Jumal Rolle	Ryan Lankford	William Powell
Eight	McLeod Bethel-Thompson	DeVonte Dedmon	Cody Fajardo	Cody Fajardo
Nine	Janarion Grant	Brandon Banks	C.J. Gable	Janarion Grant
Ten	Vernon Adams Jr.	Trevor Harris	Reggie Begelton	Reggie Begelton
Eleven	Willie Jefferson	Dylan Wynn	DaVaris Daniels	Willie Jefferson
Twelve	Dane Evans	Bralon Addison	Derel Walker	Dane Evans
Thirteen	Chris Streveler	John Bowman	Willie Jefferson	Chris Streveler
Fourteen	Tre Roberson	Eric Rogers	William Powell	William Powell
Fifteen	Vernon Adams Jr.	Jake Wieneke	Andrew Harris	Andrew Harris
Sixteen	Simoni Lawrence	Cody Fajardo	Dane Evans	Cody Fajardo
Seventeen	Bryan Burnham	Shaq Evans	Mike Reilly	Shaq Evans
Eighteen	S.J. Green	Andrew Harris	Marcus Sayles	Andrew Harris
Nineteen	Dane Evans	Reggie Begelton	Tyrell Sutton	Reggie Begelton
Twenty	Brandon Banks	Cody Fajardo	Dane Evans	Cody Fajardo
Twenty One	Cameron Marshall	A.C. Leonard	D.J. Lalama	

=== CFL Top Performers of the Month ===
Month	First	Second	Third
June	Trevor Harris	Brandon Banks	Sean Thomas Erlington
July	Winston Rose	William Stanback	Charleston Hughes
August	Willie Jefferson	Trevor Harris	Dylan Wynn
September	Bralon Addison	Dane Evans	Charleston Hughes
October	Brandon Banks	Bo Levi Mitchell	Dane Evans

== 2019 CFL All-Stars ==
=== Offence ===
- QB – Cody Fajardo, Saskatchewan Roughriders
- RB – William Stanback, Montreal Alouettes
- R – Brandon Banks, Hamilton Tiger-Cats
- R – Reggie Begelton, Calgary Stampeders
- R – Bryan Burnham, BC Lions
- R – Shaq Evans, Saskatchewan Roughriders
- R – Bralon Addison, Hamilton Tiger–Cats
- OT – Stanley Bryant, Winnipeg Blue Bombers
- OT – Chris Van Zeyl, Hamilton Tiger–Cats
- OG – Shane Bergman, Calgary Stampeders
- OG – Brandon Revenberg, Hamilton Tiger-Cats
- C – Dan Clark, Saskatchewan Roughriders

=== Defence ===
- DT – Dylan Wynn, Hamilton Tiger-Cats
- DT – Almondo Sewell, Edmonton Eskimos
- DE – Willie Jefferson, Winnipeg Blue Bombers
- DE – Charleston Hughes, Saskatchewan Roughriders
- LB – Simoni Lawrence, Hamilton Tiger-Cats
- LB – Hénoc Muamba, Montreal Alouettes
- CLB – Derrick Moncrief, Saskatchewan Roughriders
- CB – Tre Roberson, Calgary Stampeders
- CB – Winston Rose, Winnipeg Blue Bombers
- HB – Greg Reid, Montreal Alouettes
- HB – Richard Leonard, Hamilton Tiger-Cats
- S – Tunde Adeleke, Hamilton Tiger–Cats

=== Special teams ===
- K – Sergio Castillo, BC Lions
- P – Richie Leone, Ottawa Redblacks
- ST – Frankie Williams, Hamilton Tiger–Cats

== 2019 CFL Western All-Stars ==
=== Offence ===
- QB – Cody Fajardo, Saskatchewan Roughriders
- RB – Andrew Harris, Winnipeg Blue Bombers
- R – Bryan Burnham, BC Lions
- R – Reggie Begelton, Calgary Stampeders
- R – Shaq Evans, Saskatchewan Roughriders
- R – Greg Ellingson, Edmonton Eskimos
- R – Eric Rogers, Calgary Stampeders
- OT – Stanley Bryant, Winnipeg Blue Bombers
- OT – Derek Dennis, Calgary Stampeders
- OG – Shane Bergman, Calgary Stampeders
- OG – Matt O'Donnell, Edmonton Eskimos
- C – Dan Clark, Saskatchewan Roughriders

=== Defence ===
- DT – Almondo Sewell, Edmonton Eskimos
- DT – Mike Moore, Edmonton Eskimos
- DE – Willie Jefferson, Winnipeg Blue Bombers
- DE – Charleston Hughes, Saskatchewan Roughriders
- LB – Solomon Elimimian, Saskatchewan Roughriders
- LB – Larry Dean, Edmonton Eskimos
- CLB – Derrick Moncrief, Saskatchewan Roughriders
- CB – Tre Roberson, Calgary Stampeders
- CB – Winston Rose, Winnipeg Blue Bombers
- HB – Marcus Sayles, Winnipeg Blue Bombers
- HB – DaShaun Amos, Calgary Stampeders
- S – Mike Edem, Saskatchewan Roughriders

=== Special teams ===
- K – Sergio Castillo, BC Lions
- P – Jon Ryan, Saskatchewan Roughriders
- ST – Mike Miller, Winnipeg Blue Bombers

== 2019 CFL Eastern All-Stars ==
=== Offence ===
- QB – Vernon Adams Jr., Montreal Alouettes
- RB – William Stanback, Montreal Alouettes
- R – Brandon Banks, Hamilton Tiger-Cats
- R – Bralon Addison, Hamilton Tiger–Cats
- R – Derel Walker, Toronto Argonauts
- R – Geno Lewis, Montreal Alouettes
- R – S. J. Green, Toronto Argonauts
- OT – Chris Van Zeyl, Hamilton Tiger–Cats
- OT – Ryker Mathews, Hamilton Tiger–Cats
- OG – Brandon Revenberg, Hamilton Tiger-Cats
- OG – Nolan MacMillan, Ottawa Redblacks
- C – Kristian Matte, Montreal Alouettes

=== Defence ===
- DT – Dylan Wynn, Hamilton Tiger-Cats
- DT – Cleyon Laing, Toronto Argonauts
- DE – Ja'Gared Davis, Hamilton Tiger–Cats
- DE – John Bowman, Montreal Alouettes
- LB – Simoni Lawrence, Hamilton Tiger-Cats
- LB – Hénoc Muamba, Montreal Alouettes
- CLB – Patrick Levels, Montreal Alouettes
- CB – Tommie Campbell, Montreal Alouettes
- CB – Delvin Breaux, Hamilton Tiger-Cats
- HB – Greg Reid, Montreal Alouettes
- HB – Richard Leonard, Hamilton Tiger-Cats
- S – Tunde Adeleke, Hamilton Tiger–Cats

=== Special teams ===
- K – Lirim Hajrullahu, Hamilton Tiger-Cats
- P – Richie Leone, Ottawa Redblacks
- ST – Frankie Williams, Hamilton Tiger–Cats

== 2019 CFL awards ==
- CFL's Most Outstanding Player Award – Brandon Banks (WR), Hamilton Tiger-Cats
- CFL's Most Outstanding Canadian Award – Henoc Muamba (LB), Montreal Alouettes
- CFL's Most Outstanding Defensive Player Award – Willie Jefferson (DE), Winnipeg Blue Bombers
- CFL's Most Outstanding Offensive Lineman Award – Chris Van Zeyl, (OL), Hamilton Tiger-Cats
- CFL's Most Outstanding Rookie Award – Nate Holley (LB), Calgary Stampeders
- John Agro Special Teams Award – Frankie Williams (DB), Hamilton Tiger-Cats
- Tom Pate Memorial Award – Rob Maver (P), Calgary Stampeders
- Jake Gaudaur Veterans' Trophy – Martin Bédard (LS), Montreal Alouettes
- Annis Stukus Trophy – Orlondo Steinauer, Hamilton Tiger-Cats
- Commissioner's Award – Jim Lawson, chairman of the CFL's Board of Governors
- Hugh Campbell Distinguished Leadership Award – John Hufnagel
- Jane Mawby Tribute Award - Ross Folan, director of video operations, Calgary Stampeders

== Broadcasting ==
The 2019 season marked the 11th of the CFL's exclusive Canadian media rights with Bell Media, covering TSN (English) and RDS (French).

On January 14, the league renewed its U.S. broadcast deal with TSN's minority partner ESPN, which expired after the 2018 season; it included 20 games on ESPN's linear networks, and all remaining games carried on ESPN+. Prior to renewing with ESPN, it had been speculated that the league was courting NFL Network, which carried the league's games in 2010 and 2011; that network requested a significant change in the schedule that would have moved the season opener to an earlier date in order to secure carriage, which the league indicated could not happen without a new CBA. The league also entered a deal with MVS Comunicaciones which saw MVS broadcasting a CFL ‘Game of the Week’ beginning with the Week 1 of the regular season through until the end of the regular season on November 2.

The league continued to make games available to fans outside of major broadcast areas via CFL Game Pass, a service that streamed games over the internet to regions not covered by major broadcasters. In partnership with Yare Media, the CFL internet streaming service added a number of new territories. Additional countries included Argentina, Australia, Brazil, Chile, Columbia, New Zealand, Peru and all of Africa.
