= 2018 Toronto Argonauts season =

CFL team season

- General manager: Jim Popp
- Head coach: Marc Trestman
- Home stadium: BMO Field

Results
- Record: 4–14
- Division place: 4th, East
- Playoffs: did not qualify
- Team MOP: S. J. Green
- Team MOC: Sean McEwen
- Team MOR: Trumaine Washington

Uniform

The 2018 Toronto Argonauts season was the 61st season for the team in the Canadian Football League (CFL) and their 146th season overall. The Argonauts failed to improve upon their 9–9 record from 2017, losing their tenth game of the season to the Calgary Stampeders on September 28. Following their week 17 loss to the BC Lions on October 6, the Argonauts were the first team eliminated from post-season contention. They became the first team since the 2006 Edmonton Eskimos to fail to qualify for the playoffs in the year after winning the Grey Cup.

This was the second season with Jim Popp as general manager and Marc Trestman as head coach. Trestman was relieved of his duties the day following the Argonauts' 24–9 loss to the Ottawa Redblacks on November 2, following a 4–14 season with minimal success in Ricky Ray's absence. Ray was also indecisive about retirement at the end of the 2018 CFL regular season after sustaining a season-ending injury in the Argonauts' 41–7 loss to the Calgary Stampeders on June 23 though he ultimately retired prior to the start of the 2019 Toronto Argonauts season.

== Offseason ==
=== CFL draft ===
The 2018 CFL draft took place on May 3, 2018. The Argonauts had the last selection in each round of the draft by virtue of winning the 105th Grey Cup, less any traded picks. The Argos traded their third-round pick to the Winnipeg Blue Bombers in a trade for Drew Willy, but got Edmonton's when the Argos traded Mason Woods for James Franklin. The Argonauts also made two conditional trades, one of which was fulfilled; they lost their sixth-round selection to Montreal after acquiring S. J. Green and he had a successful season.

Round	Pick	Player	Position	School	Hometown
1	9	Ryan Hunter	OL	Bowling Green	North Bay, ON
2	18	Nelkas Kwemo	LB	Queen's	Montreal, QC
3	20	Régis Cibasu	WR	Montreal	Montreal, QC
4	35	Simon Gingras-Gagnon	FB	Laval	Quebec City, QC
5	43	Sean Harrington	LB	Michigan State	Commerce Township, MI
7	60	Mathieu Loiselle	LB	Wagner	Quebec City, QC
8	69	Kain Anzovino	LS	Kent State	Fort Erie, ON

== Preseason ==
The Argonauts played their home pre-season game in Guelph due to field maintenance for the grass at their usual home stadium, BMO Field.

Week	Date	Kickoff	Opponent	Results		TV	Venue	Attendance	Summary
Week	Date	Kickoff	Opponent	Score	Record	TV	Venue	Attendance	Summary
A	Bye								
B	Fri, June 1	7:30 p.m. EDT	@ Hamilton Tiger-Cats	W 36–18	1–0	TSN	Tim Hortons Field	NA	Recap
C	Thurs, June 7	7:30 p.m. EDT	Ottawa Redblacks	L 17–32	1–1	None	Alumni Stadium	3,921	Recap

# Games played with white uniforms.

== Regular season ==
The Toronto Argonauts lost their starting quarterback, Ricky Ray, due to a serious neck injury in the team's 41–7 loss to the Calgary Stampeders in the second week of the season. He was subsequently discharged from a Toronto hospital several days later. At the time of discharge, it was announced that Ray would miss a significant, but undisclosed, amount of time from on-field responsibilities. At the time of injury, commentators suggested that the team bench Ray in favor of their newly acquired backup quarterback, James Franklin.

=== Standings ===
East Division
Team	GP	W	L	T	Pts	PF	PA	Div	Stk	
Ottawa Redblacks	18	11	7	0	22	464	420	6–2	W3	Details
Hamilton Tiger-Cats	18	8	10	0	16	513	456	4–4	L3	Details
Montreal Alouettes	18	5	13	0	10	345	512	4–4	W2	Details
Toronto Argonauts	18	4	14	0	8	369	560	2–6	L2	Details

=== Schedule ===
Week	Game	Date	Kickoff	Opponent	Results		TV	Venue	Attendance	Summary
Week	Game	Date	Kickoff	Opponent	Score	Record	TV	Venue	Attendance	Summary
1	1	Fri, June 15	9:00 p.m. EDT	@ Saskatchewan Roughriders	L 19–27	0–1	TSN/RDS2/ESPN2	Mosaic Stadium	29,788	Recap
2	2	Sat, June 23	7:00 p.m. EDT	Calgary Stampeders	L 7–41	0–2	TSN/RDS2	BMO Field	16,450	Recap
3	Bye									
4	3	Sat, July 7	5:30 p.m. EDT	Edmonton Eskimos	W 20–17	1–2	TSN	BMO Field	12,196	Recap
5	4	Fri, July 13	9:00 p.m. EDT	@ Edmonton Eskimos	L 15–16	1–3	TSN/ESPN2	Commonwealth Stadium	31,056	Recap
6	5	Sat, July 21	4:00 p.m. EDT	Winnipeg Blue Bombers	L 20–38	1–4	TSN	BMO Field	10,844	Recap
7	6	Fri, July 27	8:30 p.m. EDT	@ Winnipeg Blue Bombers	L 14–40	1–5	TSN/RDS/ESPN2	Investors Group Field	27,116	Recap
8	7	Thurs, Aug 2	7:00 p.m. EDT	Ottawa Redblacks	W 42–41	2–5	TSN/RDS/ESPN2	BMO Field	11,857	Recap
9	Bye									
10	8	Sat, Aug 18	4:00 p.m. EDT	BC Lions	W 24–23	3–5	TSN/RDS2	BMO Field	18,104	Recap
11	9	Fri, Aug 24	7:30 p.m. EDT	@ Montreal Alouettes	L 22–25	3–6	TSN/RDS	Molson Stadium	16,480	Recap
12	10	Mon, Sept 3	6:30 p.m. EDT	@ Hamilton Tiger-Cats	L 28–42	3–7	TSN	Tim Hortons Field	24,221	Recap
13	11	Sat, Sept 8	1:00 p.m. EDT	Hamilton Tiger-Cats	L 25–36	3–8	TSN	BMO Field	15,702	Recap
14	Bye									
15	12	Sat, Sept 22	7:00 p.m. EDT	Saskatchewan Roughriders	L 29–30	3–9	TSN	BMO Field	14,479	Recap
16	13	Fri, Sept 28	9:00 p.m. EDT	@ Calgary Stampeders	L 16–38	3–10	TSN/RDS2	McMahon Stadium	24,126	Recap
17	14	Sat, Oct 6	7:00 p.m. EDT	@ BC Lions	L 23–26	3–11	TSN	BC Place	18,535	Recap
18	15	Fri, Oct 12	7:30 p.m. EDT	Hamilton Tiger-Cats	L 20–34	3–12	TSN	BMO Field	14,184	Recap
19	16	Sat, Oct 20	4:00 p.m. EDT	Montreal Alouettes	W 26–22	4–12	TSN/RDS	BMO Field	14,080	Recap
20	17	Sun, Oct 28	1:00 p.m. EDT	@ Montreal Alouettes	L 10–40	4–13	TSN/RDS/ESPN2	Molson Stadium	17,583	Recap
21	18	Fri, Nov 2	7:30 p.m. EDT	@ Ottawa Redblacks	L 9–24	4–14	TSN/RDS	TD Place Stadium	22,185	Recap

# Games played with colour uniforms.
# Games played with white uniforms.

== Roster ==
2018 Toronto Argonauts final roster
Quarterbacks: 14 McLeod Bethel-Thompson; 2 James Franklin; 9 Dakota Prukop; Running backs: 35 Brandon Burks; 38 Declan Cross; 33 Simon Gingras-Gagnon; 30 Travon Van; Receivers: 89 Duron Carter; 11 Alex Charette; 10 Armanti Edwards; 19 S. J. Green; 84 Llevi Noel; 88 Jimmy Ralph; 8 Myles White	Offensive linemen: 64 Ryan Bomben G; 66 Isiah Cage T; 67 Jamal Campbell T/G; 69 William Campbell T; 62 J'Michael Deane G; 57 Tyler Holmes G; 68 Chris Kolankowski C; 61 Sean McEwen C; Defensive linemen: 94 Frank Beltre DE; 97 Ken Bishop DT; 91 Evan Foster DE; 93 Linden Gaydosh DT; 90 Cleyon Laing DT; 18 Eric Striker DE; 75 Cameron Walker DE; 98 Dylan Wynn DT	Linebackers: 99 Sean Harrington; 45 Justin Herdman; 23 Jeff Knox; 12 Nelkas Kwemo; 91 Justin Tuggle DE; Defensive backs: 3 Alden Darby; 27 Jonathan Dowling; 29 Abdul Kanneh; 43 Marcus Roberson; 36 Trumaine Washington; 20 Matt Webster; 7 Robert Woodson; 25 Ronnie Yell	Special teams: 34 Drew Brown K; 46 Zack Medeiros P/K; 58 Jake Reinhart LS; Practice roster: 95 Hassan Barry DT; 53 John Biewald DE; 37 Anthony Covington DB; 77 Rakim Cox DE; 87 Austin Duke WR; 16 Caleb Ham DB; 42 Mathieu Loiselle LB; 40 Duke Thomas DB; 00 Chandler Worthy WR	Injured list: 13 Mario Alford WR; 6 Marcus Ball LB; 39 Matt Black DB; 80 Darren Carrington II WR; 1 Anthony Coombs SB; 92 Troy Davis DE; 49 Jeff Finley DT; 21 Qudarius Ford DB; 5 Jermaine Gabriel DB; 28 Akeem Jordan LB; 4 Will Likely DB; 44 Dexter McCluster RB; 41 Nakas Onyeka LB; 17 Ronnie Pfeffer K/P; 47 Terrance Plummer LB; 15 Ricky Ray QB; 65 D. J. Sackey G; 0 Johnny Sears DB; 81 Rodney Smith WR; 26 Cassius Vaughn DB; 54 Chris Van Zeyl T; 32 James Wilder Jr. RB; 82 Malcolm Williams WR; 48 Bear Woods LB; Italics indicate international player

== Coaching staff ==
Toronto Argonauts staff
Front office and support staff: Owner – Maple Leaf Sports & Entertainment; President – Bill Manning; Special advisor – Michael Clemons; General manager – Jim Popp; Assistant general manager – Spencer Zimmerman; Director of football administration – Catherine Raiche; Director of football operations – Ian Sanderson; Director of canadian scouting – Vince Magri; Scout/Football Ops Assistant – Timur Malik; Consultant, Football Operations – Nick Volpe; Equipment manager – Danny Webb; Assistant equipment manager – Tom Bryce; Head athletic therapist – Scott Shannon; Assistant athletic therapist – Josh Shewell	Head coaches: Head coach – Marc Trestman; Offensive coaches: Offensive coordinator/receivers – Tommy Condell; Quarterbacks – Anthony Calvillo; Running backs – Josh Moore; Offensive line – Jonathan Himebauch; Offensive quality control – Justin Poindexter; Defensive coaches: Defensive coordinator – Mike Archer; Defensive backs – Tyron Brackenridge; Linebackers – Greg Quick; Defensive line – Kerry Locklin; Defensive quality control – Gavin Lake; Special teams coaches: Special teams coordinator – Kevin Eiben; Assistant special teams – Wendell Avery; → Coaching staff
