= College Gridiron Showcase =

College football event in Fort Worth, Texas, US

- CGS
- Stadium: McNair Stadium
- Location: Fort Worth, Texas
- Previous stadiums: Pennington Field
- Previous locations: Addison, Texas (2018); Bedford, Texas (2016–2017); Addison, Texas (2015)
- Operated: 2015–present

The College Gridiron Showcase (CGS) is an independently operated annual post-season college football event hosted each January in Fort Worth, Texas. The event consists of NFL draft prospects who have completed their eligibility in NCAA Division I, NCAA Division II, NCAA Division III, and the NAIA. CGS also hosts the Pro Gridiron Showcase for non-draft eligible free agents. The event originated as a post-season all star game in 2015, but switched to its current drill showcase and "controlled scrimmage" format in 2016.

In addition to on-field drills, the event also features educational seminars including those on financial acumen and marketing.

== History ==
=== 2015 ===
The inaugural CGS event, an All Star Game format was held in Addison, TX. Of the 104 participants, 10 were selected in the NFL Draft, 53 signed as undrafted free agents, and 22 were rookie camp invitees. The event also featured the number one overall pick in the 2015 CFL draft, Alex Mateas.

Notable participants

Player	College
Josh Shirley	UNLV
Dyshawn Davis	Syracuse
Antonio Johnson	North Texas
Quinn Epperly	Princeton
Ricky Collins	Texas A&M - Commerce
Tyree Hollins	Grambling State
Dominique Davis	Liberty
Alex Mateas	UCONN
Mark Roberts	Lamar University
Chris Reed	Minnesota St- Mankato
Justin Hamilton	UL- Lafayette
David Mayo	Texas State
Rick Lovato	Old Dominion
Harold Jones-Quartey	Findlay University

=== 2016 ===
The 2016 CGS was held at Pennington Field in Bedford, Texas and was the first that featured the showcase format as opposed to all star game.

Notable participants in the 2016 College Gridiron Showcase include CFL stars Juwan Brescacin, Romar Morris, Eric Temple, Robert Porter, Marvin Hall, Jr., and Reggie Begelton, NFL players Jakeem Grant, Trevor Williams, Jackson Branden, Andrew Adams, and JD McKissic, as well as the XFL's Kenneth Farrow and Jake Shenandoah.

=== 2017 ===
The 2017 CGS was held at Pennington Field in Bedford, Texas. Lake Erie's Anthony Kukwa was named offensive MVP. Arkansas State's Chris Odom was the defensive MVP.

Notable participants

Player	College
Christophe Mulumba	Maine
Dane Evans	Tulsa
Anthony Cioffi	Rutgers
DaQuan Pace	Eastern Michigan
Romond DeLoatch	Temple
Seth Coate	University of Saint Francis
Chad Geter	Gardner-Webb University
Samuel Williams	East Texas Baptist University
Drew Wolitarsky	Minnesota
Qadr Spooner	McGill
Younghoe Koo	Georgia Southern
Alex Armah	West Georgia
Rashaad Coward	Old Dominion
Matt Breida	Georgia Southern
Adam Butler	Vanderbilt
Jake Hollister	Wyoming
Bradley Seaton	Villanova
Christian Kuntz	Duquesne
Nick James	Mississippi State
Tyson Graham	South Dakota
Casey Sayles	Ohio
David Rivers	Youngstown State

=== 2018 ===
The 2018 College Gridiron Showcase was held at Greenhill School in Addison, TX.

Notable participants

Player	College
Julien Laurent	Georgia State University
David Knevel	University of Nebraska
David Mackie	Western (CA)
Godfrey Onyeka	Wilfrid Laurier
Jackson Bennett	University of Ottawa
Andrew Pickett	University of Guelph
Tyrone Pierre	Laval University
Trent Sherfield	Vanderbilt
Alvin Jones	UTEP
Michael Love	University of South Florida
Kaare Vedvik	Marshall University
Dontrell Hilliard	Tulane
Michael Ford	Southeast Missouri State
Alex Light	University of Richmond
Elijah Nkansah	The University of Toledo
George Odum	Central Arkansas
Matthew Adams	University of Houston
Tre Herndon	Vanderbilt
Daniel Ekuale	Washington State University
Sebastian Joseph-Day	Rutgers University
Nathaniel Wozniak	University of Minnesota
Ryan Santoso	University of Minnesota
Vyncint Smith	Limestone College
Craig James	Southern Illinois University
Emmanuel Ellerbee	Rice University
Darius James	Auburn
Austin MacGinnis	University of Kentucky
Tomasi Laulile	Brigham Young University
Logan Tuley-Tillman	UTEP
James Butler	Iowa
Chad Kanoff	Princeton University
Fred Lauina	Oregon State University
De'Mornay Pierson-El	University Of Nebraska
Kellen Soulek	South Dakota State
Ryan White	Vanderbilt
Jalen Tolliver	University of Arkansas at Monticello

=== 2019 ===
The 2019 OTA-style format was held January 5–9, 2019 at McNair Stadium in Fort Worth. In addition to the regular showcase and symposium, the 2020 event saw the addition of a "Small School Invitational Showcase" to provide a scouting forum for players from lower tier conferences.

Running back AJ Ouellette from Ohio University and defensive end Kevin Thompson from Bethune-Cookman were named offensive and defensive MVPs, respectively.

Notable participants

Player	College
Cole Sears	University of Arkansas at Monticello
Zackary Williams	University of Manitoba
Samuel Thomassin	University Laval
Jamie Harry	University of Ottawa
Nate Rogers	Wayne State College
Delroy Baker Jr	Indiana University
Connor Griffiths	University of British Columbia
Brady Oliveira	University of North Dakota
Freedom Akinmoladun	Nebraska
Luke Gifford	Nebraska
Austin Fort	University of Wyoming
Trinity Benson	East Central Oklahoma
PJ Locke III	University of Texas at Austin
Kabion Ento	University of Colorado
Tim Ward	Old Dominion University
Jody Fortson Jr.	Valdosta State University
AJ Cole	North Carolina State University
Gunner Olszewski	Bemidji State University
Jake Dolegala	Central Connecticut State University
Derrick Kelly Jr	Florida State University
Kareem Orr	Tennessee Chattanooga (UTC)
Jonathan Harris	Lindenwood University
James O’Hagan	University at Buffalo
Jawuan Johnson	Texas Christian University
Durrant Miles	Boise State
Kirk Barron	Purdue University
Bruno Reagan	Vanderbilt University

=== 2020 ===
CGS 2020 was held January 3–8 at McNair Stadium in Fort Worth.

Notable participants

Player	College
Isaac Adeyemi-Berglund	Southeastern Louisiana
Dante Brown	Fort Hays State University
Stavros Katsantonis	University of British Columbia
Cameron Lawson	Queen's University
Adam Auclair	Université Laval
Dylan Giffen	Western University
Noah Hallett	McMaster University
Marc Liegghio	University of Western
Jaylon Moore	UT-Martin
Joshua Thomas	Appalachian State University
Sam Franklin Jr	Temple University
Lachavious Simmons	Tennessee State University
Kendall Futrell	East Carolina university
Willington Previlon	Rutgers University
Tyler Davis	Georgia Tech
Austen Pleasants	Ohio University
Matt Cole	McKendree University
Bill Murray	William and Mary
Blake Gillikin	Penn State University
Corliss Waitman	University of South Alabama
Chase Harrell	University of Arkansas
Gavin Heslop	Stony Brook University
Elijah Mencer	University at Albany
Benning Potoae	Washington
Aaron Brewer	Texas State University
