= Kene Onyeka =

Nigerian-Canadian gridiron football player (born 1996)

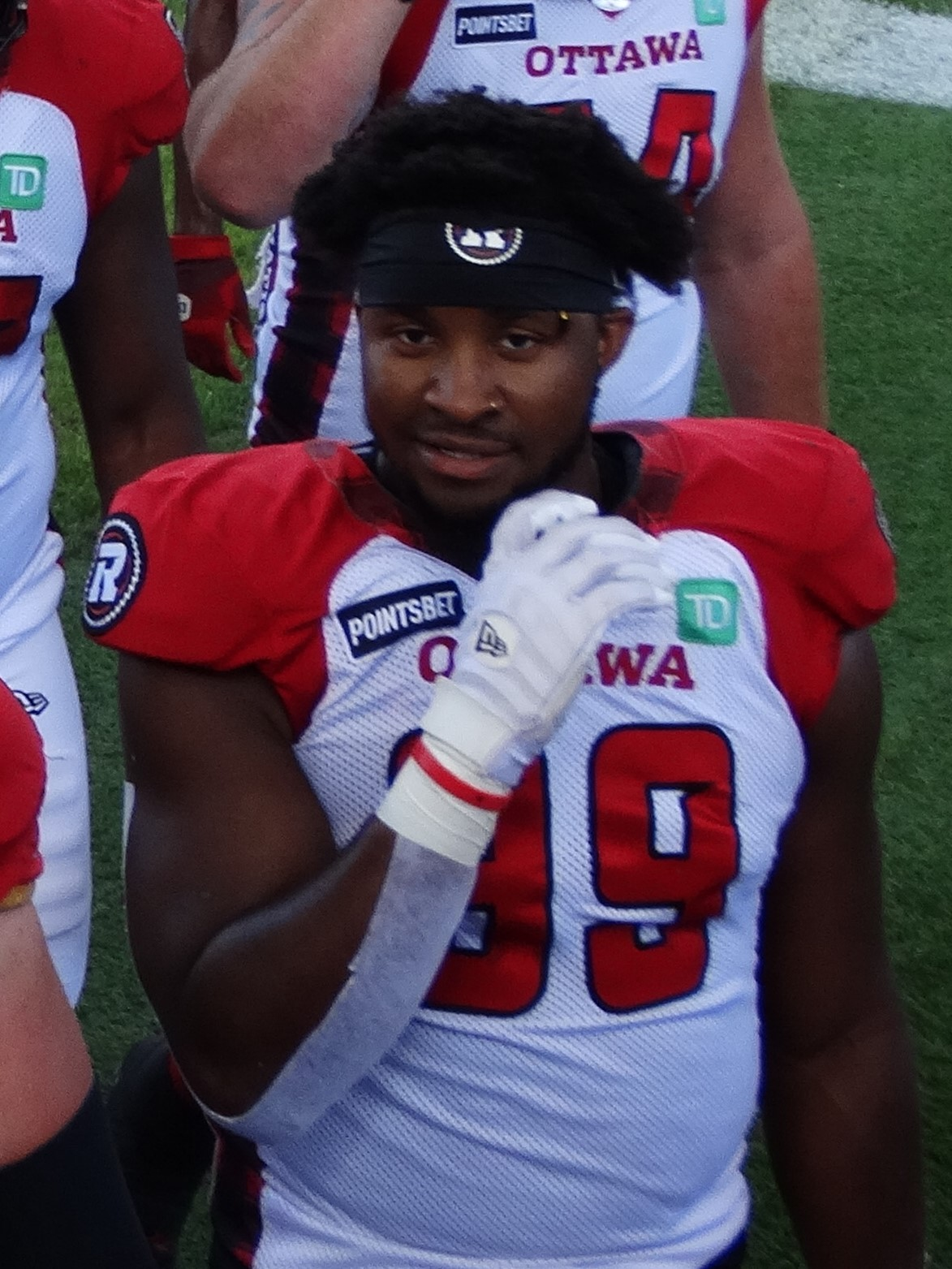
- Onyeka with the Ottawa Redblacks in 2022

Profile
- Position: Defensive lineman

Personal information
- Born: November 18, 1996 (age 29); Lagos, Nigeria
- Listed height: 6 ft 3 in (1.91 m)
- Listed weight: 244 lb (111 kg)

Career information
- University: Carleton
- CFL draft: 2018: 4th round, 29th overall pick

Career history
- Ottawa Redblacks (2018)*; Ottawa Redblacks (2019–2025); Hamilton Tiger-Cats (2026)*
- * Offseason or practice squad member only

Awards and highlights
- 2× First-team All-Canadian (2017, 2018)
- Stats at CFL.ca

Kene Onyeka (born November 18, 1996) is a Nigerian-Canadian professional professional defensive lineman.

== University career ==
Onyeka played U Sports football for the Carleton Ravens from 2014 to 2018. In 2017, Onyeka was named a First-team All-Canadian and the OUA top lineman as he recorded 32 solo tackles, including 12.5 tackles for a loss, 14 assisted tackles, 10.5 sacks, and four forced fumbles. He repeated both awards following the 2018 season, despite only playing in six of the eight regular season games as he had 21 solo tackles (10.5 tackles for a loss), six assisted tackles, and seven sacks.

== Professional career ==
Pre-draft measurables
Height	Weight	40-yard dash	20-yard shuttle	Three-cone drill	Vertical jump	Broad jump	Bench press
6 ft 2 1/4 in (1.89 m)	244 lb (111 kg)	5.15 s	4.37 s	7.57 s	28.5 in (0.72 m)	8 ft 10 1/2 in (2.71 m)	12 reps
All values from CFL Combine

=== Ottawa Redblacks ===
While eligible to be selected in the 2018 CFL draft, Onyeka informed Canadian Football League teams that he planned to return to university to complete his mechanical engineering degree at Carleton University. He had been ranked as the 14th best player available in the draft in the winter rankings, but his draft stock fell as teams knew he would not play for them in 2018. Nonetheless, he was drafted with the 29th overall selection, in the fourth round, of the 2018 draft by the Ottawa Redblacks and signed with the team on May 16, 2018. After attending 2018 training camp, he returned to complete his final year of U Sports eligibility.

After his fifth season with the Ravens, Onyeka re-signed with the Redblacks on December 3, 2018. He began the 2019 season on the practice roster, but was promoted to the active roster and played in his first professional game on August 2, 2019, against the Montreal Alouettes. He played in six regular season games that year and recorded three special teams tackles.

Due to the cancellation of the 2020 CFL season, Onyeka did not play in 2020. Instead, he signed a contract extension with the Redblacks on January 6, 2021. Following training camp, he made the team's opening day roster and made his first defensive tackle on August 7, 2021 against the Edmonton Elks. Later in the year, he recorded his first two career sacks on October 11, 2021 in the Thanksgiving Day Classic against the Montreal Alouettes when he brought down Vernon Adams twice in the game. He played in 13 regular season games in 2021 where he had 14 defensive tackles, eight special teams tackles, two sacks, and one forced fumble. Onyeka continued his development into his third season in the league, in which he played in 17 regular season games recording 17 defensive tackles, nine special teams tackles, five sacks and one forced fumble. On December 20, 2022, Onyeka and the Redblacks agreed to a two-year contract extension. He became a free agent upon the expiry of his contract on February 10, 2026.

=== Hamilton Tiger-Cats ===
On February 10, 2026, it was announced that Onyeka had signed with the Hamilton Tiger-Cats. He was released on May 31 as part of final roster cuts.

== Personal life ==
Onyeka was born in Lagos, Nigeria to parents Jane and Godfrey Onyeka Sr. He moved with his family to Canada when he was nine years old and grew up in Brampton, Ontario. His older brother, Godfrey Onyeka, plays professionally in the CFL as a defensive back. His cousin, Nakas Onyeka, played linebacker and was drafted by the Toronto Argonauts, and his other cousin, Kosi Onyeka, a defensive back, signed with the Saskatchewan Roughriders.
