= David Brown (Canadian football) =

Canadian gridiron football player and coach (born 1994)

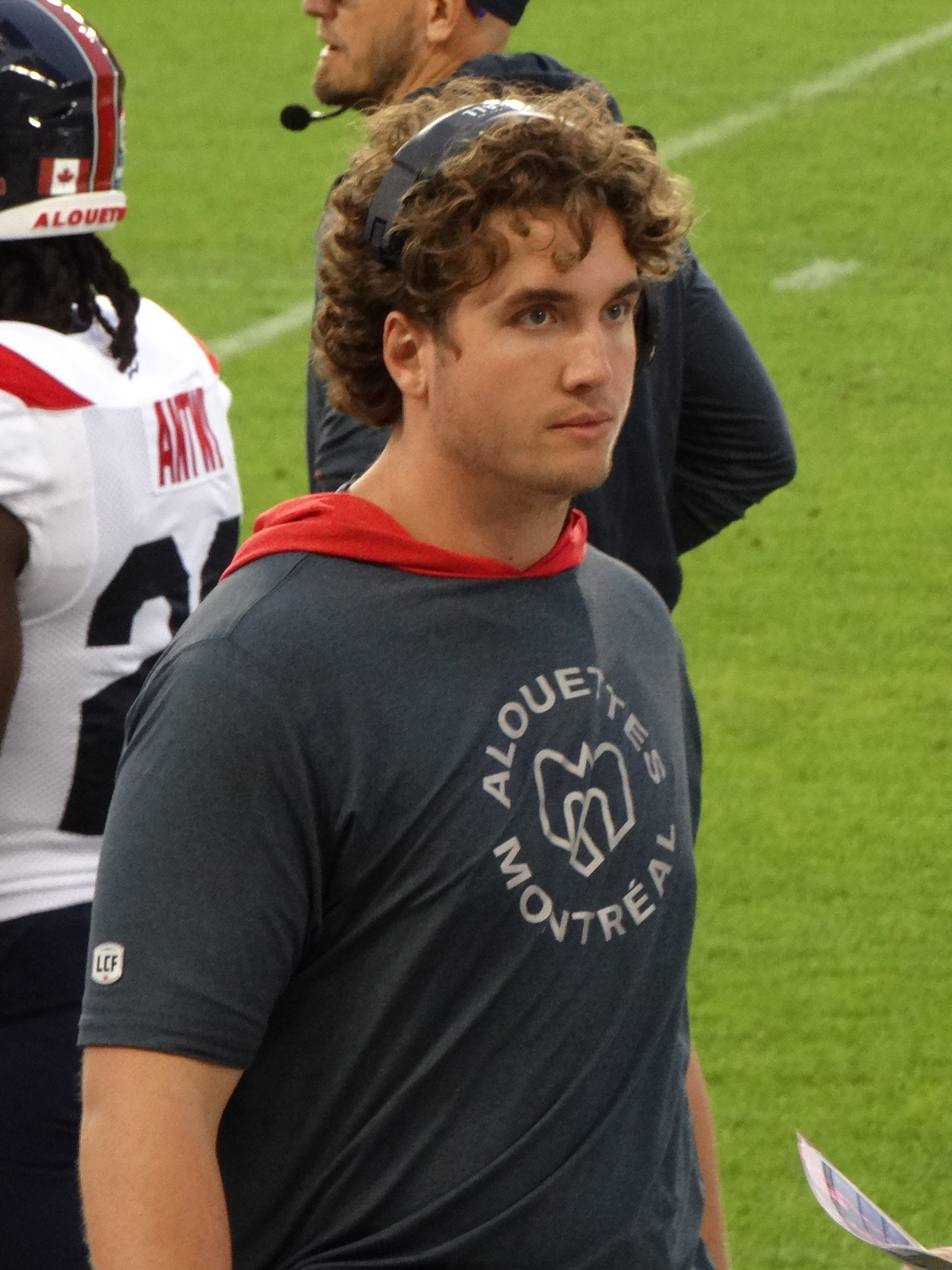
- Brown with the Montreal Alouettes in 2024

Montreal Alouettes
- Title: Offensive line coach

Personal information
- Born: July 11, 1994 (age 32); London, Ontario, Canada
- Listed height: 6 ft 5 in (1.96 m)
- Listed weight: 300 lb (136 kg)

Career information
- Position: Offensive lineman (No. 66)
- High school: Regina Mundi Catholic
- University: Western
- CFL draft: 2018: 4th round, 28th overall pick

Career history

Playing
- 2018: Calgary Stampeders*
- 2019–2020: Calgary Stampeders
- 2021–2023: Montreal Alouettes
- * Offseason or practice squad member only

Coaching
- 2024–2025: Montreal Alouettes (Assistant offensive line coach)
- 2026–present: Montreal Alouettes (Offensive line coach)

Awards and highlights
- Grey Cup champion (2023); Vanier Cup champion (2017); 2× First-team All-Canadian (2017, 2018)
- Stats at CFL.ca

David Brown (born July 11, 1994) is a Canadian football coach and former offensive lineman who is currently the offensive line coach for the Montreal Alouettes of the Canadian Football League (CFL).

== University career ==
Brown played U Sports football for the Western Mustangs from 2014 to 2018. During the 53rd Vanier Cup, Brown tore his ACL but would finish the game helping the Mustangs to victory. He was a U Sports First Team All-Canadian in 2017 and 2018.

== Professional career ==
=== Calgary Stampeders ===
Brown was drafted in the fourth round, 28th overall, by the Calgary Stampeders in the 2018 CFL draft and signed with the team on May 14, 2018. He attended training camp with the team in 2018 but did not participate in the preseason due to a previous injury. Brown was suspended and then released so that he could complete his final year of U Sports eligibility. He re-joined the Stampeders after the conclusion of the 2018 season as it was announced by the team on December 21, 2018.

In the 2019 season, Brown began the year on the practice roster, but dressed in his first professional game on July 18, 2019, against the Toronto Argonauts. He was active for seven regular season games in 2019. He did not play in 2020 due to the cancellation of the 2020 CFL season. As a pending free agent, Brown was released on January 13, 2021.

=== Montreal Alouettes ===
On June 9, 2021, it was announced that Brown had signed with the Montreal Alouettes. Following training camp, he made the team's active roster as a backup. He started his first game on October 11, 2021, in the Thanksgiving Day Classic against the Ottawa Redblacks. Brown played in 10 regular season games, starting in three, before being placed on the injured list for the final four games of 2021. He returned for the East Semi-Final playoff game, but the Alouettes lost to the Hamilton Tiger-Cats. He signed a contract extension on December 17, 2021.

In the 2022 season, Brown played in all 18 regular season games. He started at centre in the East Semi-Final against the Hamilton Tiger-Cats and the East Final against the Toronto Argonauts.

In the 2023 season, Brown tore his ACL for the third time during training camp and spent the entire season on the injured list. During the season he assisted offensive line coach Luc Brodeur-Jourdain and the Alouettes would go on to win the 110th Grey Cup.

== Coaching career ==
=== Montreal Alouettes ===
On December 21, 2023, it was announced that Brown had joined the coaching staff of the Alouettes as the team's assistant offensive line coach.

On February 4, 2026, it was announced that Brown had been promoted to become the Alouettes' offensive line coach.
