= Andrew Pickett =

Canadian football player (born 1996)

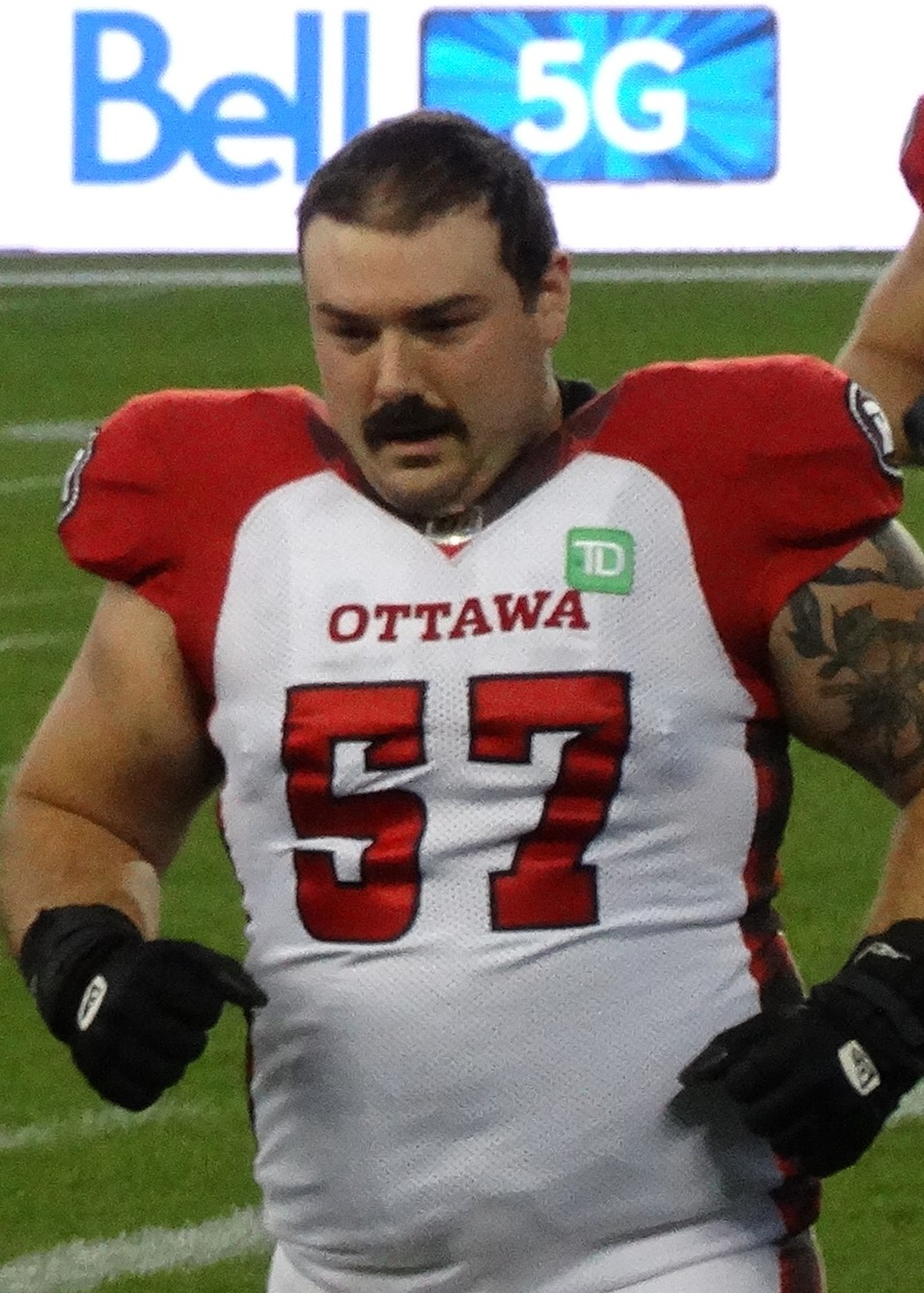
- Pickett with the Ottawa Redblacks in 2021

No. 57
- Position: Offensive lineman

Personal information
- Born: May 12, 1996 (age 30); Kitchener, Ontario, Canada
- Listed height: 6 ft 3 in (1.91 m)
- Listed weight: 323 lb (147 kg)

Career information
- High school: Resurrection Catholic Secondary
- University: Guelph
- CFL draft: 2018: 3rd round, 22nd overall pick

Career history
- 2018–2022: Ottawa Redblacks
- 2022: Hamilton Tiger-Cats

Awards and highlights
- First-team All-Canadian (2017)
- Stats at CFL.ca

Andrew Pickett (born May 12, 1996) is a Canadian former professional football offensive lineman.

== University career ==
Pickett played U Sports football for the Guelph Gryphons from 2014 to 2017. He was named an OUA All-Star three times and was named a U Sports All-Canadian in 2017.

== Professional career ==
Pre-draft measurables
Height	Weight	40-yard dash	20-yard shuttle	Three-cone drill	Vertical jump	Broad jump	Bench press
6 ft 3 in (1.91 m)	313 lb (142 kg)	5.53 s	5.03 s	8.62 s	21.5 in (0.55 m)	8 ft 2 in (2.49 m)	25 reps
All values from CFL Combine

=== Ottawa Redblacks ===
Pickett was drafted by the Ottawa Redblacks in the third round, 22nd overall, in the 2018 CFL draft and signed with the team on May 16, 2018. However, he suffered a season-ending injury before the regular season began and spent the entire 2018 season on the injured list. In 2019, he sustained another injury and was again out for the season. He did not play in 2020 due to the cancellation of the 2020 CFL season.

Entering the 2021 season fully healthy, Pickett played in his first professional game in the Redblacks' season opening win against the Edmonton Elks on August 7, 2021. He later made his first professional start on September 22, 2021, against the Hamilton Tiger-Cats. He spent part of 2022 training camp with the team, but was released after the first pre-season game on May 29, 2022. He played in 13 regular season games on 2021. However, he was released after the first 2022 pre-season game on May 29, 2022.

=== Hamilton Tiger-Cats ===
On June 14, 2022, it was announced that Pickett had signed a practice roster agreement with the Hamilton Tiger-Cats. He was promoted to the active roster on June 23, moved back to the practice roster on June 27, and released on July 1, 2022.

== Personal life ==
Pickett was born in Kitchener, Ontario to parents John and Terri Pickett.
