= Matt Webster =

Canadian football player (born 1992)

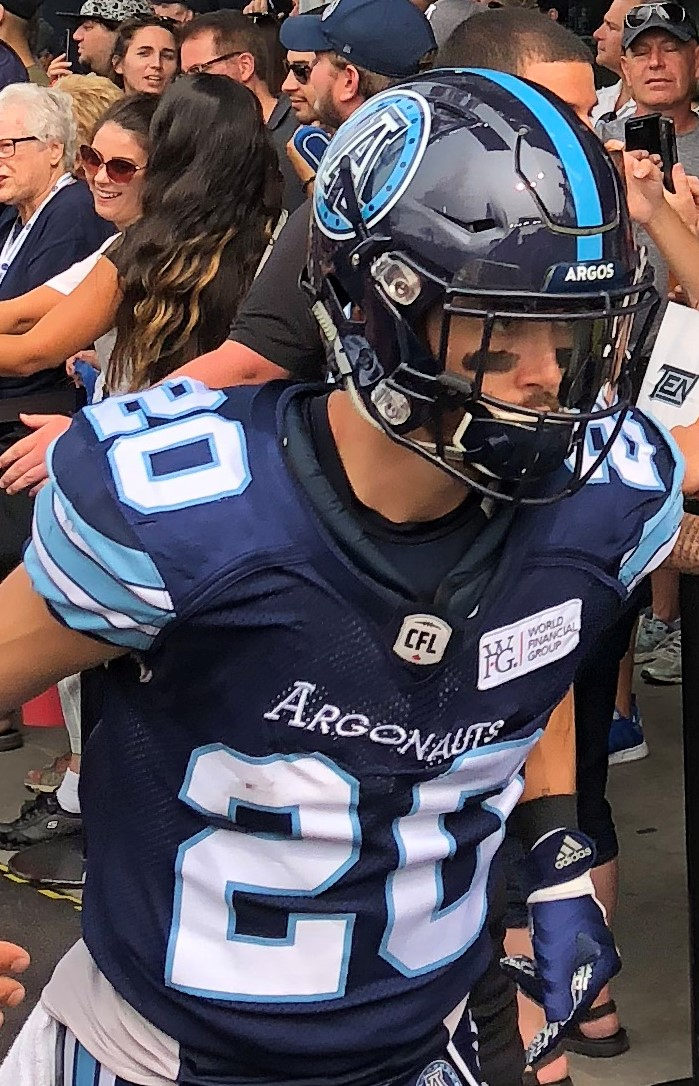
- Webster with the Toronto Argonauts in 2018

No. 20
- Position: Defensive back

Personal information
- Born: April 25, 1992 (age 34); Calgary, Alberta, Canada
- Listed height: 5 ft 11 in (1.80 m)
- Listed weight: 195 lb (88 kg)

Career information
- High school: Western Canada
- University: Queen's
- CFL draft: 2014: 5th round, 39th overall pick

Career history
- 2014–2016: Saskatchewan Roughriders
- 2017–2020: Toronto Argonauts
- Stats at CFL.ca

Matt Webster (born April 25, 1992) is a Canadian former professional football defensive back who played in the Canadian Football League (CFL). He was drafted in the fifth round of the 2014 CFL draft by the Saskatchewan Roughriders and played with the team for three seasons. He won his first Grey Cup championship as a member of the Toronto Argonauts in 2017. He played CIS football for the Queen's Gaels.

== Amateur career ==
Webster played high school football for the Western Canada Redhawks. From 2010 to 2013, he played college football for the Queen's Golden Gaels. In Week 4 of his senior year at Queen's, Webster suffered a season-ending broken collarbone. Prior to his injury, Webster had recorded 16.5 defensive tackles and two interceptions in the 2013 season.

== Professional career ==
=== Saskatchewan Roughriders ===
Webster was picked in the fifth round of the 2014 CFL draft by the Saskatchewan Roughriders with the 39th overall pick. He was released from the team near the end of training camp, but was later added to the practice squad. Webster went on to play in eight games in his rookie season as a result of injuries to other players. He recorded two tackles and eight special teams tackles in 2014. Webster played in all 18 games in 2015, and made his first professional start on September 6, 2015 against the Winnipeg Blue Bombers. Following the 2015 season, Webster re-signed with the Roughriders on December 21, 2015. He played in 11 games for the Roughriders in 2016, recording two defensive tackles and eight special teams tackles.

=== Toronto Argonauts ===
On February 17, 2017, Webster signed with the Toronto Argonauts as a free agent. He played in all 18 regular season games, recording three defensive tackles, ten special teams tackles, and one forced fumble. He played in both post-season games, including the 105th Grey Cup game where he recorded one special teams tackle en route to his first Grey Cup championship. He dressed in 14 games in 2018, missing four due to injury, but also started the last four games of the season at safety. He recorded 13 defensive tackles and five special teams tackles in the regular season as the Argonauts failed to qualify for the playoffs that year. In the following offseason, he signed a two-year contract extension through to the 2020 CFL season on December 14, 2018.
