= Trey Rutherford =

Canadian football player (born 1995)

Profile
- Position: Guard

Personal information
- Born: December 22, 1995 (age 30); Markham, Ontario
- Listed height: 6 ft 5 in (1.96 m)
- Listed weight: 312 lb (142 kg)

Career information
- High school: Kent (CT)
- College: Connecticut
- CFL draft: 2018: 1st round, 2nd overall pick

Career history
- Montreal Alouettes (2018–2020)
- Stats at CFL.ca

Trey Chance Rutherford is a former professional gridiron football guard who played for two seasons with the Montreal Alouettes of the Canadian Football League. He played college football at Connecticut.

== Professional career ==
On May 3, 2018, Rutherford was selected by the Montreal Alouettes with the second overall pick in the 2018 CFL draft. Rutherford officially signed with the Alouettes on May 17, 2018. He played in 27 regular season games before announcing his retirement from professional football on January 20, 2021 to pursue a career as a police officer.
