= Daniel Petermann =

Canadian gridiron football player (born 1995)

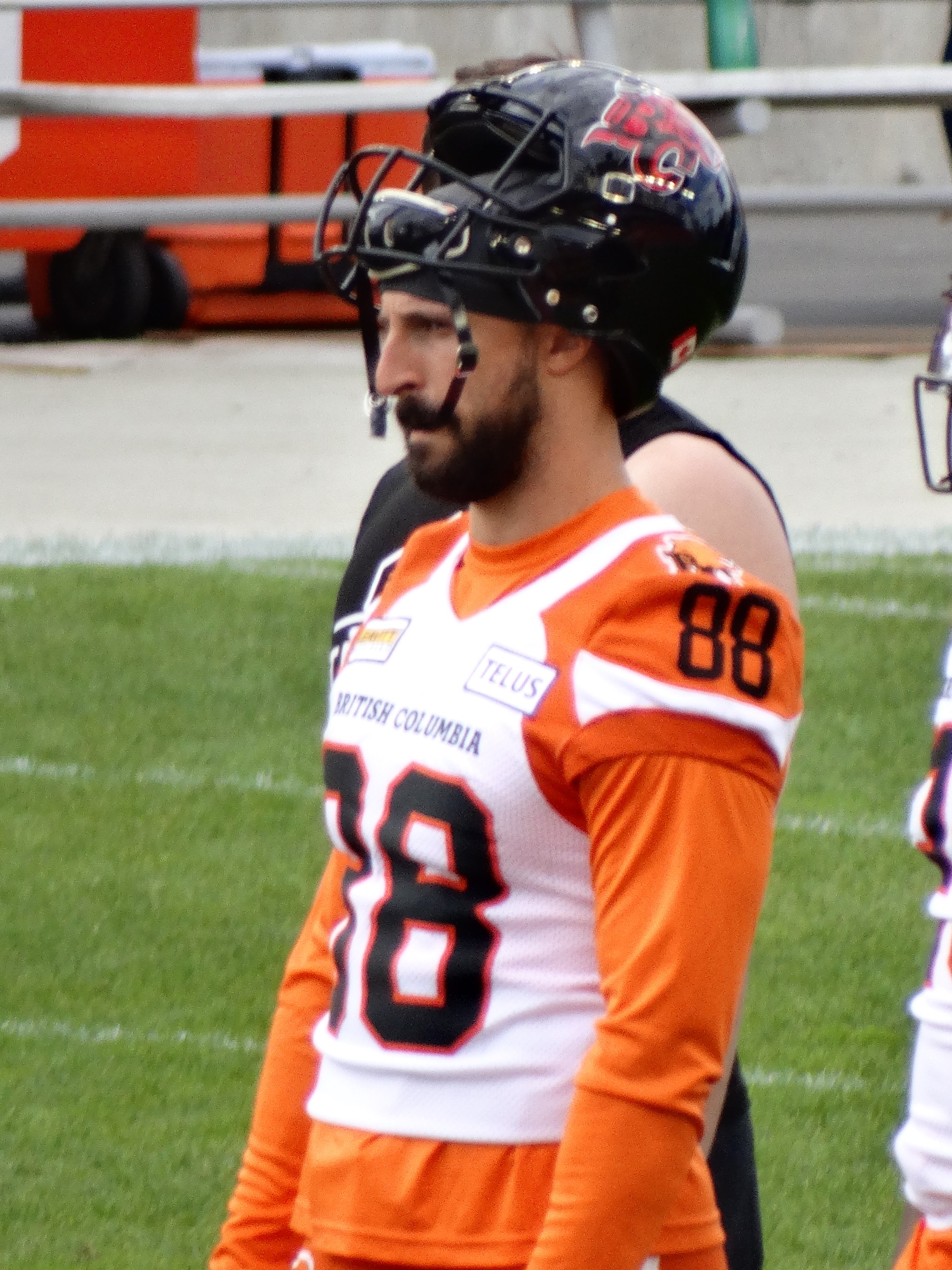
- Petermann with the BC Lions in 2022

Profile
- Position: Wide receiver

Personal information
- Born: October 24, 1995 (age 31); Stoney Creek, Ontario, Canada
- Listed height: 5 ft 11 in (1.80 m)
- Listed weight: 205 lb (93 kg)

Career information
- University: McMaster
- CFL draft: 2018: 3rd round, 26th overall pick

Career history
- 2018–2020: Winnipeg Blue Bombers
- 2021: Ottawa Redblacks
- 2022–2023: BC Lions

Awards and highlights
- Grey Cup champion (2019)
- Stats at CFL.ca

Daniel Petermann (born October 4, 1995) is a Canadian professional football wide receiver. He has played for the Winnipeg Blue Bombers, Ottawa Redblacks, and BC Lions of the Canadian Football League (CFL).

== University career ==
Petermann played U Sports football for the McMaster Marauders from 2014 to 2017. In 2014, he was named the OUA Rookie of the year where he played in eight regular season games and had 35 receptions for 468 yards and four touchdowns. He also played in the team's 50th Vanier Cup loss to the Montreal Carabins where he had ten catches for 66 yards.

== Professional career ==
Pre-draft measurables
Height	Weight	40-yard dash	20-yard shuttle	Three-cone drill	Vertical jump	Broad jump	Bench press
5 ft 11 in (1.80 m)	205 lb (93 kg)	4.54 s	4.22 s	7.03 s	39.0 in (0.99 m)	10 ft 4 1/4 in (3.16 m)	16 reps
All values from CFL Combine

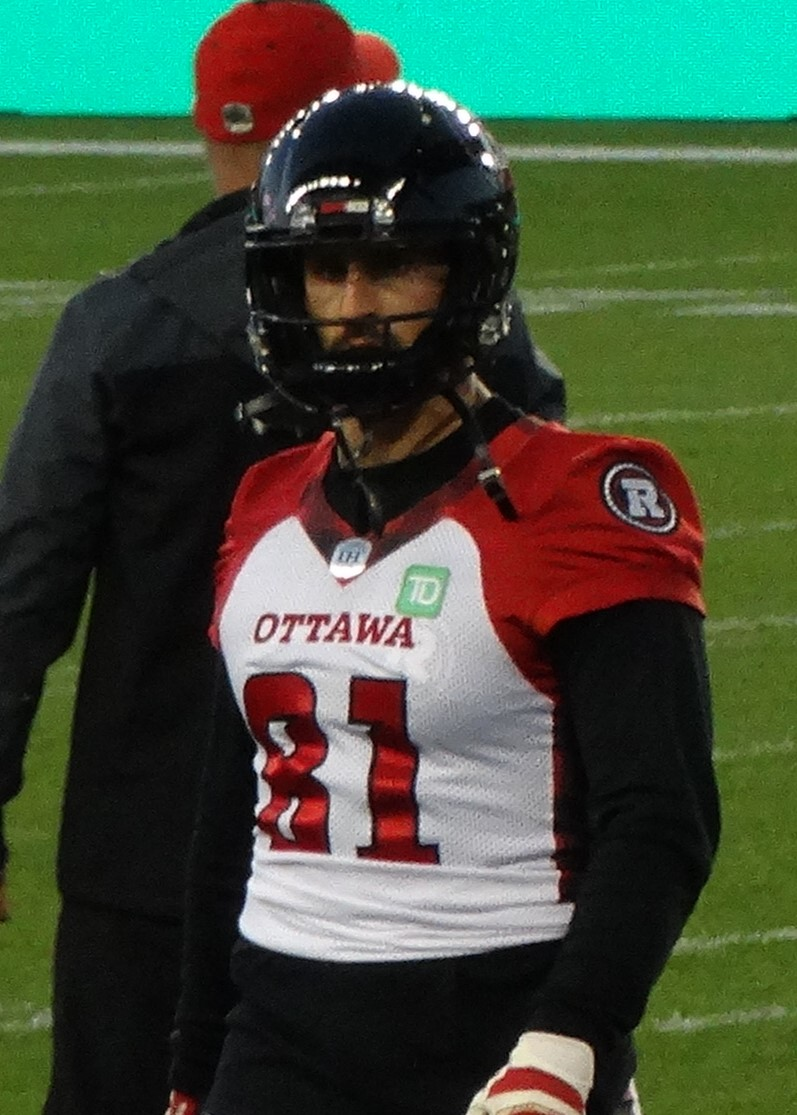
Petermann with the Ottawa Redblacks in 2021

=== Winnipeg Blue Bombers ===
Petermann was drafted in the third round, 26th overall, in the 2018 CFL draft by the Winnipeg Blue Bombers and was signed on May 14, 2018. He made the team's opening day roster and played in his first professional game on June 14, 2018, against the Edmonton Eskimos. Petermann scored his first touchdown on a nine-yard reception from Chris Streveler in the Banjo Bowl on September 8, 2018. In his rookie season, he played in all 18 regular season games and recorded 10 receptions for 154 yards and one touchdown.

In 2019, Petermann again played in all 18 regular season games and had 15 catches for 118 yards and one touchdown. He also played in all three post-season games that year and won his first Grey Cup championship as the Blue Bombers won the 107th Grey Cup. The 2020 CFL season was cancelled and he became a free agent in 2021.

=== Ottawa Redblacks ===
On February 10, 2021, Petermann signed with the Ottawa Redblacks. He played in ten regular season games with the team where he had 16 catches for 148 yards and two touchdowns. He became a free agent when his contract expired on February 8, 2022.

=== BC Lions ===
On February 8, 2022, it was announced that Petermann had signed with the BC Lions. On February 13, 2024, Petermann became a free agent after his contract with the Lions was not renewed.
