= Nelkas Kwemo =

French-Canadian gridiron football player (born 1995)

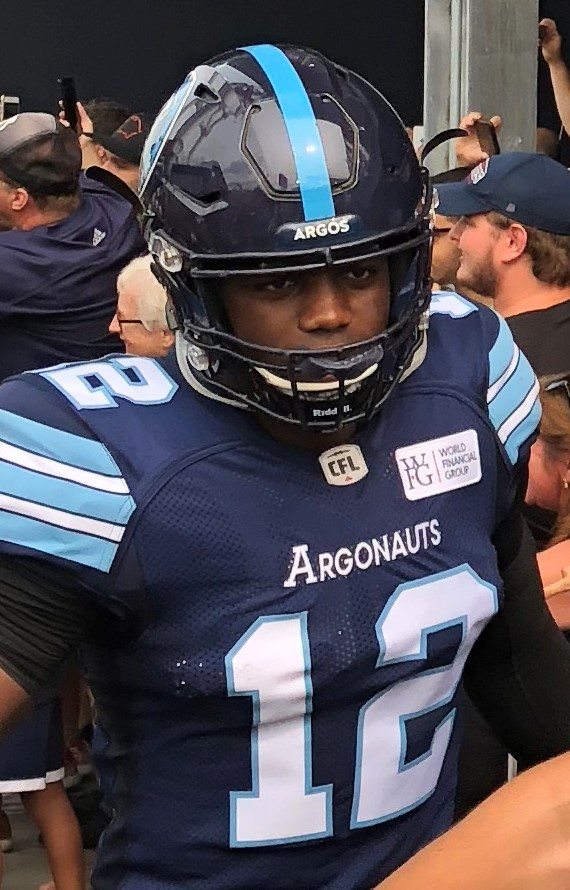
- Kwemo before his professional debut on August 18, 2018.

No. 12
- Position: Linebacker

Personal information
- Born: May 5, 1995 (age 31); Paris, France
- Listed height: 6 ft 3 in (1.91 m)
- Listed weight: 231 lb (105 kg)

Career information
- High school: Collège Sainte-Anne
- University: Queen's Gaels
- CFL draft: 2018: 2nd round, 18th overall pick

Career history
- 2018–2021: Toronto Argonauts

Awards and highlights
- 2018 1st Team All-Canadian (U Sports)
- Stats at CFL.ca

Nelkas Kwemo (born May 5, 1995) is a French former professional Canadian football linebacker who played for the Toronto Argonauts of the Canadian Football League (CFL). He played U Sports football with the Queen's Gaels from 2014 to 2017.

== Early life ==
Kwemo was born in Paris, France, but moved to Montreal, Quebec at an early age.

== Professional career ==
Pre-draft measurables
Height	Weight	40-yard dash	20-yard shuttle	Three-cone drill	Vertical jump	Broad jump	Bench press
6 ft 2 3/4 in (1.90 m)	231 lb (105 kg)	5.11 s	4.65 s	7.85 s	30.0 in (0.76 m)	9 ft 4 in (2.84 m)	15 reps
All values from CFL Combine

Kwemo was drafted 18th overall in the 2018 CFL draft by the Toronto Argonauts after he was ranked as the 17th best prospect in the December 2017 Scouting Bureau Rankings, but un-ranked in the Final April report. He signed with the team on May 19, 2018. Kwemo was injured to begin the 2018 season, but made his debut on August 18, 2018. He played in 11 regular season games, recording three defensive tackles and 15 special teams tackles, earning praise on special teams alongside fellow 2018 draft pick and core special teamer Sean Harrington. The Argonauts' 2019 was just as disappointing as 2018 with a 4-14 record, but Kwemo developed into a rotational linebacker with 13 tackles on defense, and he continued his special teams excellence with 16 more tackles.

Kwemo signed a contract extension with the Argonauts on December 28, 2020. He was placed on the suspended list on July 10, 2021. He sat out the entire season and became a free agent upon the expiry of his contract on February 8, 2022.
