= Ricky Collins =

American gridiron football player (born 1992)

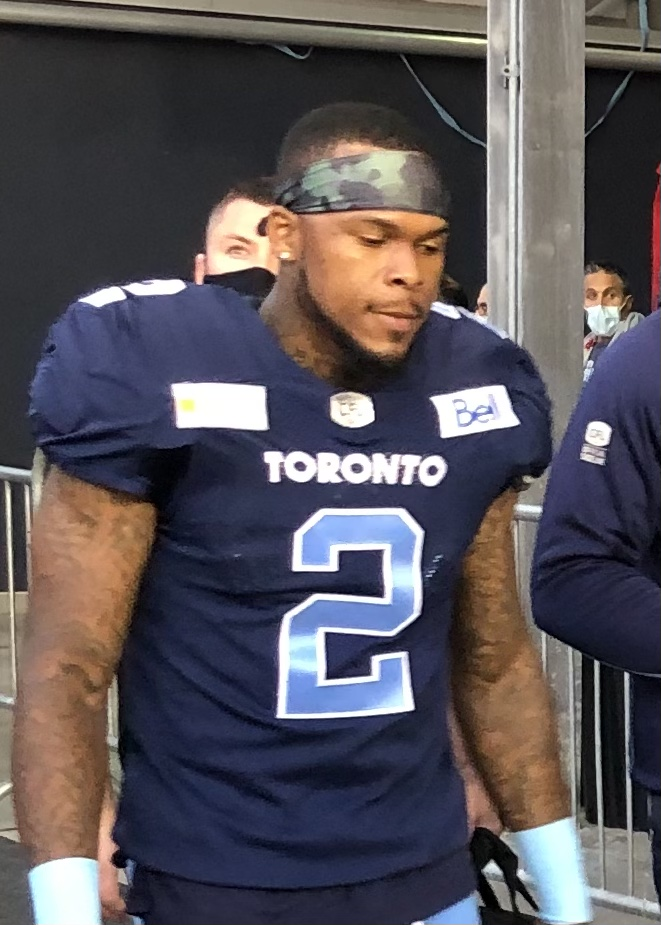
- Collins with the Toronto Argonauts in 2021

Profile
- Position: Wide receiver

Personal information
- Born: March 5, 1992 (age 34); Tyler, Texas, U.S.
- Listed height: 6 ft 0 in (1.83 m)
- Listed weight: 200 lb (91 kg)

Career information
- High school: John Tyler (Tyler, Texas)
- College: Kilgore College; Midwestern State; Texas A&M–Commerce

Career history
- 2015: Green Bay Packers*
- 2015: Brooklyn Bolts
- 2016: Winnipeg Blue Bombers*
- 2016–2017: Saskatchewan Roughriders
- 2017: Hamilton Tiger-Cats*
- 2018: BC Lions
- 2019–2020: Edmonton Eskimos
- 2021: Toronto Argonauts
- * Offseason or practice squad member only

Career CFL statistics
- Receptions: 241
- Receiving yards: 3076
- Receiving touchdowns: 7
- Return yards: 312
- Return touchdowns: 0
- Stats at CFL.ca

Ricky Collins Jr. (born March 5, 1992) is an American former professional football player who was a wide receiver in the Canadian Football League (CFL). He played college football at Kilgore College, Midwestern State University, and Texas A&M University–Commerce. He was a member of the Green Bay Packers of the National Football League (NFL), the Winnipeg Blue Bombers, Saskatchewan Roughriders, Hamilton Tiger-Cats, BC Lions, Edmonton Eskimos, and Toronto Argonauts of the CFL, and the Brooklyn Bolts of the Fall Experimental Football League.

== Early life ==
Collins played high school football at John Tyler High School, in his hometown, Tyler, Texas. During his senior season, he caught 44 passes for 1,053 yards and 13 touchdowns. He also ran the sprint relays in track for his high school.

== College career ==
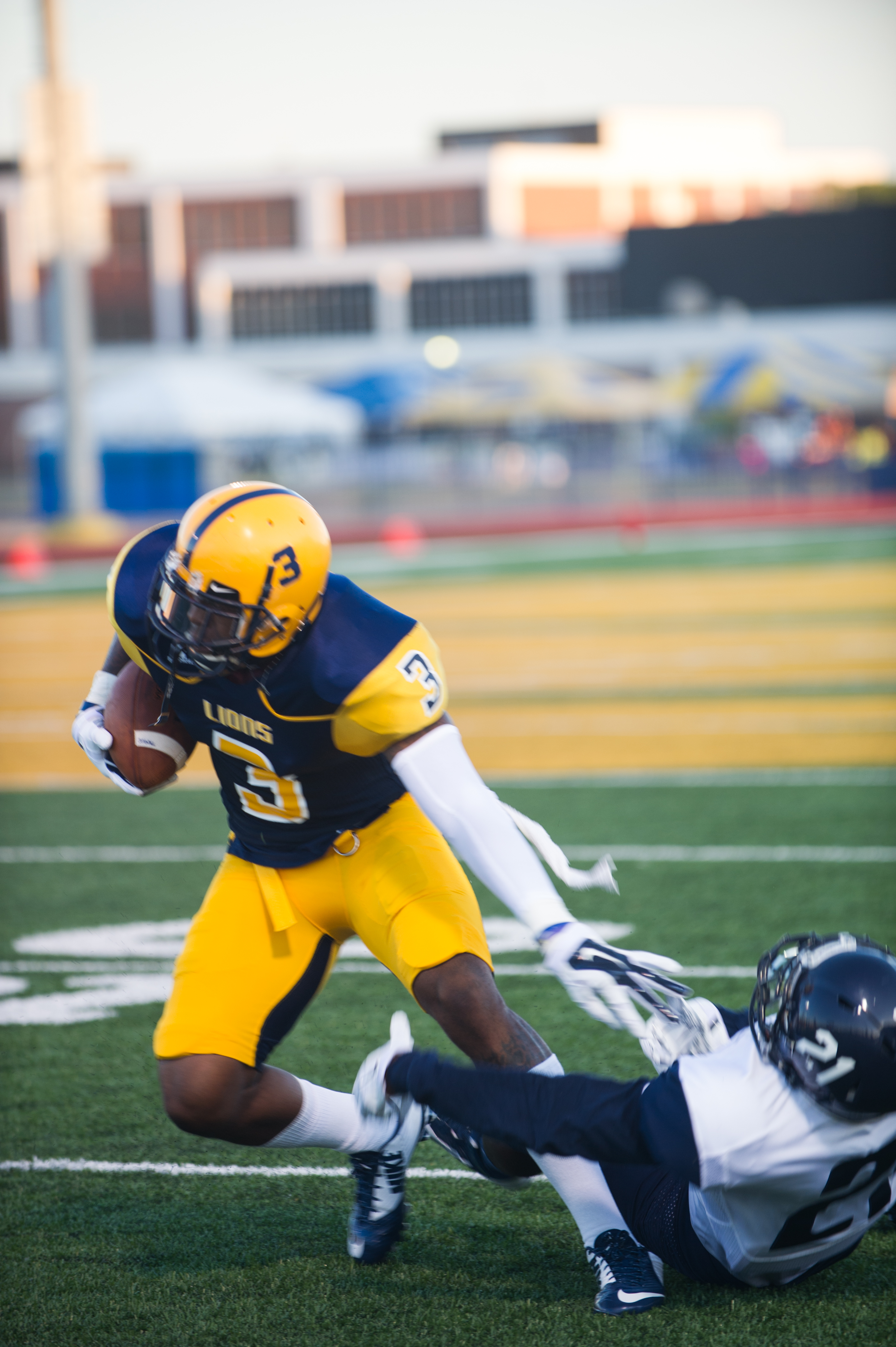
Collins (3) in action against East Texas Baptist in 2014.

Collins begin his college career in 2010 at Kilgore Junior College; he had 34 receptions for 654 yards and 3 touchdowns during his freshman season.

During his sophomore season in 2011, he continued at Kilgore and caught 50 passes for 571 yards with 6 touchdowns.

After playing at Kilgore, Collins transferred to Midwestern State University for the 2012 season. He started in 2 out of the first 5 games and hauled in 7 passes for 98 yards, before walking away from football to care for his ill father.

After the 2012 season, Collins transferred to Texas A&M University–Commerce but had to sit out a year as a redshirt and pay his own way through school due to the fact that Midwestern State had not released him to be transferred.

After sitting out for the 2013 season, Collins was eligible to play in 2014 and caught 71 passes for 1,187 yards and 14 touchdowns, he also threw a 44-yard touchdown pass on a trick play in a game against Tarleton. He currently holds the A&M–Commerce record for touchdown receptions in a season, which was previously held by his teammate Vernon Johnson. He helped lead a conference championship-winning A&M–Commerce team that led the nation in both average points per game (54.1) and average yards per game (535.4). Collins also took part in the team's season-opening, record-breaking performance against East Texas Baptist, during which the offense produced 13 touchdowns, 98 points, and 986 total yards of offense. After the season, he was awarded Lone Star Conference first team honors.

After the 2014 season Collins was selected to compete in the College Gridiron Showcase. He was projected to be drafted in the 6th or 7th round of the NFL draft. However, one NFL scout said of Collins: "Good size and has talent but was in a very simple offense and I think he needs to come in as a free agent and prove he can take on a pro offense."

=== NCAA statistics ===
			Receiving					Rushing					Passing							Kick return				
Year	Team	G	Rec	Yds	Avg	Lng	TD	Att	Yds	Avg	Lng	TD	Comp	Att	Yds	TD	Int	Lng	Pct	Ret	Yds	Avg	Lng	TD
2012	Midwestern State	5	7	98	14.0	49	0	0	0	0	0	0	0	0	0	0	0	0	0	0	0	0	0	0
2013	Texas A&M–Commerce	Redshirt																						
2014	Texas A&M–Commerce	11	71	1187	16.7	77	14	1	-16	-16.0	-16	0	1	2	44	1	0	44	.50	1	19	19.0	19	0
Totals:		16	78	1285	16.5	77	14	1	-16	-16.0	-16	0	1	2	44	1	0	44	.50	1	19	19.0	19	0

== Professional career ==
=== Green Bay Packers ===
After his 2014 season, Collins signed with the Green Bay Packers as an undrafted free agent. He sustained an injury during minicamp and was placed on the physically unable to perform list entering training camp before the preseason. Collins was cut by the Packers with an injury settlement just before the start of the 2015 preseason.

=== Brooklyn Bolts ===
Collins joined the Brooklyn Bolts of the Fall Experimental Football League for the remainder of 2015.

=== Winnipeg Blue Bombers ===
On January 14, 2016, Collins was signed by the Winnipeg Blue Bombers of the Canadian Football League. He was released by the team on May 3, 2016.

=== Saskatchewan Roughriders ===
Collins signed with the Saskatchewan Roughriders on May 29, 2016. Collins got off to a great start in the 2016 season with his best performance coming in a Week 3 game against the Edmonton Eskimos, where Collins caught 6 passes for 115 yards and 1 touchdown. Collins was placed on the six-game injured reserve list on September 17, 2016. Collins returned from injury in Week 17 and had a big performance, catching 7 passes for 113 yards and 1 touchdown against the Toronto Argonauts. Collins finished his first season with 48 receptions for 720 yards and 2 touchdowns. He also had 8 kick returns for 151 yards, 4 punt returns for 41 yards, and 1 missed field goal returned for 38 yards, giving him a total of 950 all-purpose yards for the season. He was second on the team in receiving yards and tied for second on the team in receiving touchdowns despite the fact that he missed 4 games. Collins began the 2017 season on the six-game injured reserve list with a shoulder injury that he had sustained during the Week 1 match-up against the Montreal Alouettes. Collins would only play in only one game for the Riders in 2017.

=== Hamilton Tiger-Cats ===
On August 21, 2017, Collins was traded to the Hamilton Tiger-Cats along with a seventh round pick in the 2018 CFL draft, in exchange for defensive end Mike McAdoo and a sixth round pick in the 2018 draft. He was cut from team on September 26, 2017, having never made an appearance.

=== BC Lions ===
About a week after free agency began Collins signed with the BC Lions on February 22, 2018. On July 20 in a game against the Ottawa Redblacks Collins caught 6 passes for 81 yards and a touchdown including a clutch 39 yard reception in the 2nd quarter to put the Lions into scoring position. However the Lions still fell short and lost the game 29–25. He had another big performance in a rematch against the Redblacks, Collins finished the game with 10 receptions for 105 yards and a touchdown as the Lions defeated the Redblacks 26–14. The Lions made the playoffs and lost 48–8 against the Hamilton Tiger-Cats, Collins led the team in receiving in this playoff game with 5 receptions for 95 yards. Collins finished the season with 60 receptions for 611 yards, 2 receiving touchdowns, 10 rushing yards, along with 46 yards as a returner on special teams.

=== Edmonton Eskimos ===
In February 2019, Collins was signed to a three-year contract during the first day of free agency. Collins provided an immediate impact for Edmonton, with a 175-yard performance in week 1. Collins amassed 3 games where he surpassed 100 yards receiving, and was a consistent contributor, passing the 1,000 yard receiving mark for the first time in his career to help Edmonton return to the playoffs.

After the CFL canceled the 2020 season due to the COVID-19 pandemic, Collins chose to opt-out of his contract with the Eskimos on August 26, 2020. He opted back into his contract with the Eskimos on October 6, 2020. He was released on January 31, 2021, and announced his retirement from football on February 26, 2021.

=== Toronto Argonauts ===
On June 28, 2021, Collins signed with the Toronto Argonauts of the Canadian Football League. Collins finished the season with 55 receptions for 642 yards and helped lead the Argonauts to the playoffs.

=== CFL statistics ===
Regular season

			Receiving					Rushing					Kick return					Punt return					Missed FG return				
Year	Team	G	Rec	Yds	Avg	Lng	TD	Att	Yds	Avg	Lng	TD	Ret	Yds	Avg	Lng	TD	Ret	Yds	Avg	Lng	TD	Ret	Yds	Avg	Lng	TD
2016	SSK	14	48	720	15.0	54	2	0	0	0	0	0	8	151	18.9	27	0	4	41	10.3	34	0	1	38	38.0	38	0
2017	SSK	1	0	0	0	0	0	0	0	0	0	0	0	0	0	0	0	1	1	1	1	0	0	0	0	0	0
2018	BC	17	60	611	10.2	39	2	1	10	10.0	10	0	1	21	21.0	21	0	6	25	4.2	10	0	0	0	0	0	0
2019	EDM	17	78	1,103	14.1	83	3	2	-1	-0.5	4	0	0	0	0.0	0	0	0	0	0.0	0	0	0	0	0	0	0
2021	TOR	12	55	642	11.7	81	0	0	0	0.0	0	0	2	36	18.0	19	0	4	37	9.3	15	0	0	0	0	0	0
Totals:		61	241	3,076	12.7	83	7	3	9	3.0	10	0	11	208	18.9	27	0	15	104	6.9	34	0	1	38	38.0	38	0

Postseason

			Receiving					Rushing					Kick return					Punt return					Missed FG return				
Year	Team	G	Rec	Yds	Avg	Lng	TD	Att	Yds	Avg	Lng	TD	Ret	Yds	Avg	Lng	TD	Ret	Yds	Avg	Lng	TD	Ret	Yds	Avg	Lng	TD
2018	BC	1	5	95	19.0	34	0	0	0	0	0	0	0	0	0	0	0	0	0	0	0	0	0	0	0	0	0
2019	EDM	2	7	127	18.1	38	0	0	0	0	0	0	0	0	0	0	0	0	0	0	0	0	0	0	0	0	0
2021	TOR	1	4	21	5.2	9	0	0	0	0	0	0	0	0	0	0	0	0	0	0	0	0	0	0	0	0	0
Totals:		4	16	243	15.1	38	0	0	0	0	0	0	0	0	0	0	0	0	0	0	0	0	0	0	0	0	0
