= Elijah Nkansah =

American football player (born 1994)

Profile
- Position: Offensive tackle

Personal information
- Born: December 28, 1994 (age 31); Muncie, Indiana, U.S.
- Listed height: 6 ft 5 in (1.96 m)
- Listed weight: 315 lb (143 kg)

Career information
- High school: William Mason (Mason, Ohio)
- College: Toledo
- NFL draft: 2018: undrafted

Career history
- Tennessee Titans (2018)*; Seattle Seahawks (2018–2019); Houston Texans (2019–2020); Indianapolis Colts (2021)*; Tennessee Titans (2021)*; New York Jets (2021)*; Cleveland Browns (2021–2022)
- * Offseason or practice squad member only

Awards and highlights
- First-team All-MAC (2017)

Career NFL statistics
- Games played: 1
- Stats at Pro Football Reference

Elijah Osei Sefah Nkansah (born December 28, 1994) is an American football offensive tackle. He played college football at Toledo.

== Early life ==
Nkansah was born in 1994, the son of Amy Coppess and Shadrack Nkansah, who married in 1992. Elijah's brother Isaiah was born in 1996. Shadrack came to America from Ghana in the late 1980s. Amy and Shadrack met at Anderson University in Indiana. Shadrack was a chemical engineer for Cincinnati-based Procter & Gamble, and also ran marathons. Shadrack died of cancer in 2002 at age 37; he is buried in Ghana.

Elijah Nkansah played football at William Mason High School (Mason, Ohio) where he earned first-team all-league and second-team all-district honors as a senior. He was selected to play in the Ohio North-South All-Star Game. He graduated in 2013.

His brother Isaiah Nkansah has earned three varsity letters as a linebacker at Grand Valley State University through the 2018 season. Elijah and Isaiah also have another younger brother.

== College career ==
Nkansah was a member of the Toledo Rockets football team for five seasons. He redshirted his freshman year, then played in 6 games as a reserve offensive lineman in 2014. He started at right tackle in both 2015 and 2016.

As a senior in 2017 he started in all 14 games at left tackle, and he was named first-team All-MAC as the Rockets went 11-3 and won UT's first MAC Championship Game in over a decade. The Rockets played in the Dollar General Bowl in Mobile, Alabama, and Nkansah was chosen to play in the postseason College Gridiron Showcase in Addison, Texas.

He majored in Criminal Justice.

== Professional career ==
=== Tennessee Titans (first stint) ===
Nkansah signed with the Tennessee Titans as an undrafted free agent on April 28, 2018. He was cut by the Titans at the end of training camp.

=== Seattle Seahawks ===
Nkansah was signed to the Seattle Seahawks practice squad on September 3, 2018. He was promoted to the team's active roster on December 22, 2018.

Nkansah, wearing #75, made his NFL debut on December 23, 2018, in a Seahawks' 38-31 win over the Kansas City Chiefs, the next-to-last game of the regular season. He played a total of 8 snaps—7 on special teams and one on offense, during which his kick-out block helped Seahawks' running back Chris Carson score a touchdown.

On August 31, 2019, Nkansah was waived by the Seahawks and was signed to the practice squad the next day. He was released on September 7, 2019. He was re-signed to the practice squad on September 17, 2019. He was released on September 28.

=== Houston Texans ===
On October 1, 2019, Nkansah was signed to the Houston Texans practice squad. He was promoted to the active roster on December 28, 2019.

On September 5, 2020, Nkansah was waived by the Texans and signed to the practice squad the next day. His practice squad contract with the team expired after the season on January 11, 2021.

=== Indianapolis Colts ===
On January 12, 2021, Nkansah signed a reserve/futures contract with the Indianapolis Colts. On April 28, 2021, Nkansah was waived by the Colts.

=== Tennessee Titans (second stint) ===
On April 29, 2021, Nkansah was claimed off waivers by the Tennessee Titans. He was waived on July 30, 2021.

=== New York Jets ===
On September 14, 2021, Nkansah was signed to the New York Jets practice squad. He was released on October 5, 2021.

=== Cleveland Browns ===
On December 15, 2021, Nkansah was signed to the Cleveland Browns practice squad. He was released by the Browns on January 6, 2022. He signed a reserve/futures contract with the Browns on January 11, 2022. Nkansah was waived with an injury designation on August 16, 2022, and subsequently reverted to injured reserve. He was released on October 7.
