= Mark Chapman (American football) =

American football player (born 1994)

Profile
- Position: Wide receiver

Personal information
- Born: December 27, 1994 (age 31); Port Huron, Michigan, U.S.
- Listed height: 6 ft 0 in (1.83 m)
- Listed weight: 180 lb (82 kg)

Career information
- High school: Port Huron
- College: Central Michigan
- NFL draft: 2018: undrafted
- CFL draft: 2018: 1st round, 1st overall pick

Career history
- Denver Broncos (2018)*; Salt Lake Stallions (2019)*
- * Offseason or practice squad member only

Mark Chapman (born December 27, 1994) is an American former football wide receiver who was a member of the Salt Lake Stallions of the Alliance of American Football (AAF). Chapman played college football at Central Michigan. He was selected by the Hamilton Tiger-Cats with the first overall pick in the 2018 CFL draft.

== Professional career ==
Pre-draft measurables
Height	Weight	Arm length	Hand span	Wingspan	40-yard dash	10-yard split	20-yard split	20-yard shuttle	Three-cone drill	Vertical jump	Broad jump	Bench press
5 ft 11 1/2 in (1.82 m)	183 lb (83 kg)	30 1/2 in (0.77 m)	9 5/8 in (0.24 m)	6 ft 2 in (1.88 m)	4.63 s	1.62 s	2.73 s	4.12 s	7.00 s	36.0 in (0.91 m)	10 ft 7 1/4 in (3.23 m)	14 reps
All values from CFL Combine/Pro Day

=== CFL ===
On May 3, 2018, Chapman was selected with the first overall pick in the 2018 CFL draft by the Hamilton Tiger-Cats, after trading up with the Montreal Alouettes. Despite this, Chapman remained unsigned through May 20, 2018, despite the Tiger-Cats signing several other players that they drafted. Chapman attended one of the Tiger-Cats early regular season games, but left without having signed a contract.

=== NFL ===
On May 14, 2018, Chapman received a tryout for the New York Giants of the NFL. Chapman signed a contract with the Denver Broncos on July 25, 2018. He was waived by the Broncos on September 1, 2018.

=== AAF ===
In September 2018 Chapman decided to sign with the Salt Lake Stallions of the Alliance of American Football (AAF), who would begin play in February 2019. However, Chapman never played for the Stallions, citing personal reasons.
