= Darius Ciraco =

Canadian gridiron football player (born 1996)

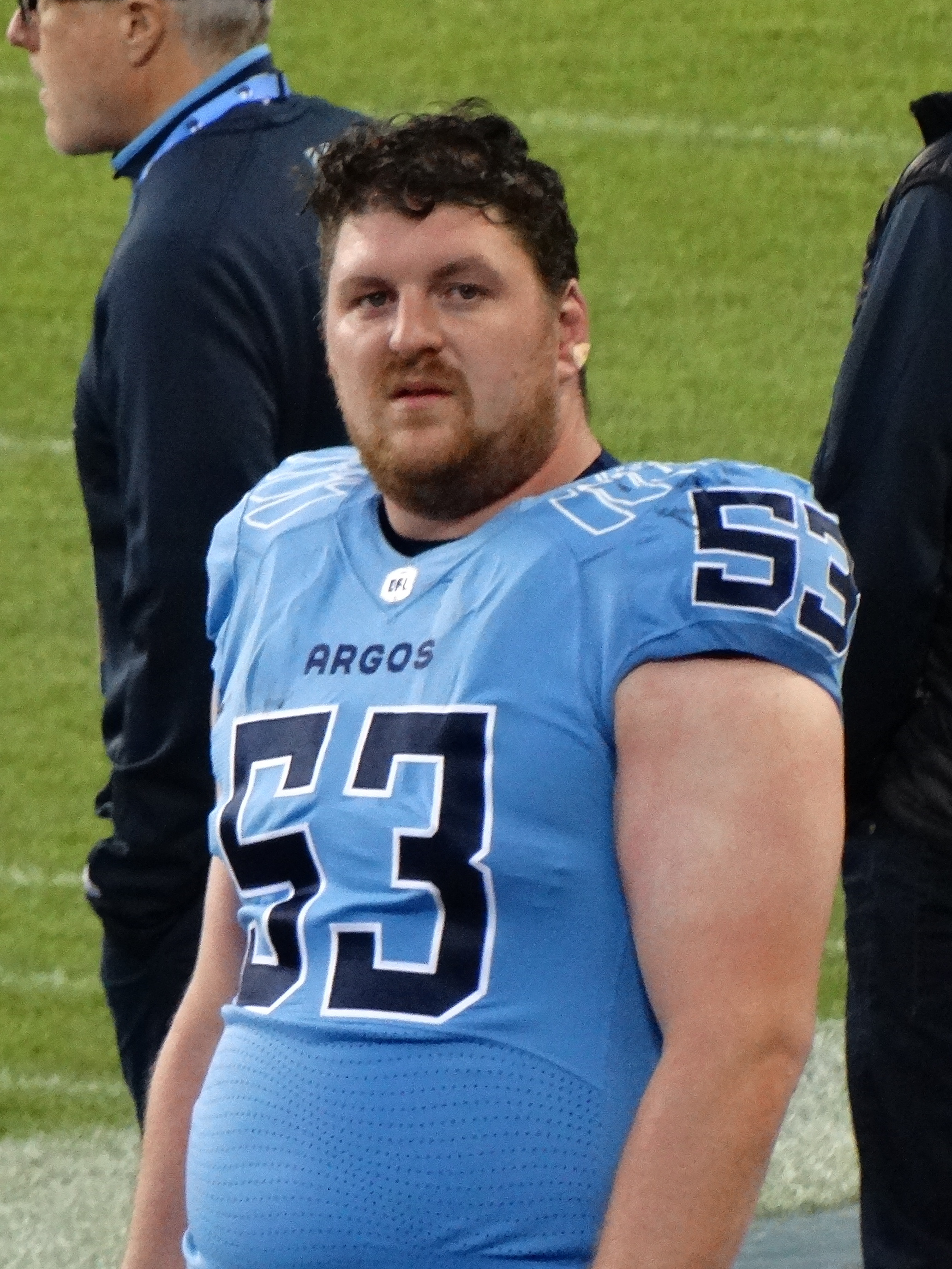
- Ciraco with the Toronto Argonauts in 2024

Profile
- Position: Offensive lineman

Personal information
- Born: February 13, 1996 (age 30); Burlington, Ontario, Canada
- Listed height: 6 ft 4 in (1.93 m)
- Listed weight: 292 lb (132 kg)

Career information
- High school: Assumption
- University: Calgary
- CFL draft: 2018: 1st round, 6th overall pick

Career history
- 2018–2021: Hamilton Tiger-Cats
- 2022: Ottawa Redblacks
- 2023–2025: Toronto Argonauts

Awards and highlights
- Grey Cup champion (2024); CFL All-Star (2023); CFL East All-Star (2023)
- Stats at CFL.ca

Darius Ciraco (born February 13, 1996) is a Canadian professional football offensive lineman. He most recently played for the Toronto Argonauts of the Canadian Football League (CFL).

== University career ==
Ciraco played U Sports football for the Calgary Dinos from 2014 to 2017.

== Professional career ==
Pre-draft measurables
Height	Weight	40-yard dash	20-yard shuttle	Three-cone drill	Vertical jump	Broad jump	Bench press
6 ft 3 5/8 in (1.92 m)	292 lb (132 kg)	5.59 s	4.87 s	8.54 s	25.5 in (0.65 m)	8 ft 3 1/2 in (2.53 m)	18 reps
All values from CFL Combine

=== Hamilton Tiger-Cats ===
Ciraco was drafted sixth overall by the Hamilton Tiger-Cats in the 2018 CFL draft and signed with the team on May 22, 2018. He started all 18 regular season games and both playoff games in his first season and was named the Tiger-Cats' Most Outstanding Rookie. Ciraco re-signed with the Hamilton Tiger-Cats on January 15, 2021. He became a free agent upon the expiry of his contract on February 8, 2022.

=== Ottawa Redblacks ===
On February 8, 2022, it was announced that Ciraco had signed with the Ottawa Redblacks. He played in 16 regular season games in 2022 and became a free agent on February 14, 2023.

=== Toronto Argonauts ===
On February 14, 2023, it was announced that Ciraco had signed with the Toronto Argonauts. In 2023, he dressed in 17 regular season games, starting in 16, as the Argonauts clinched first place in the East Division after 12 games and Ciraco rested at different points thereafter. He was named a divisional all-star and CFL all-star for the first time in his career at the end of the season.

On February 3, 2024, the Argonauts announced that Ciraco had signed a contract extension with the team. He played in the first two regular season games in 2024 before suffering a season-ending injury. He was on the injured list when the Argonauts defeated the Winnipeg Blue Bombers 41–24 in the 111th Grey Cup.

In 2025, he dressed in 12 regular season games and made one start at centre. He was a healthy scratch for the last two games of the season and was released on January 26, 2026.
