= Godfrey Onyeka =

Canadian gridiron football player (born 1994)

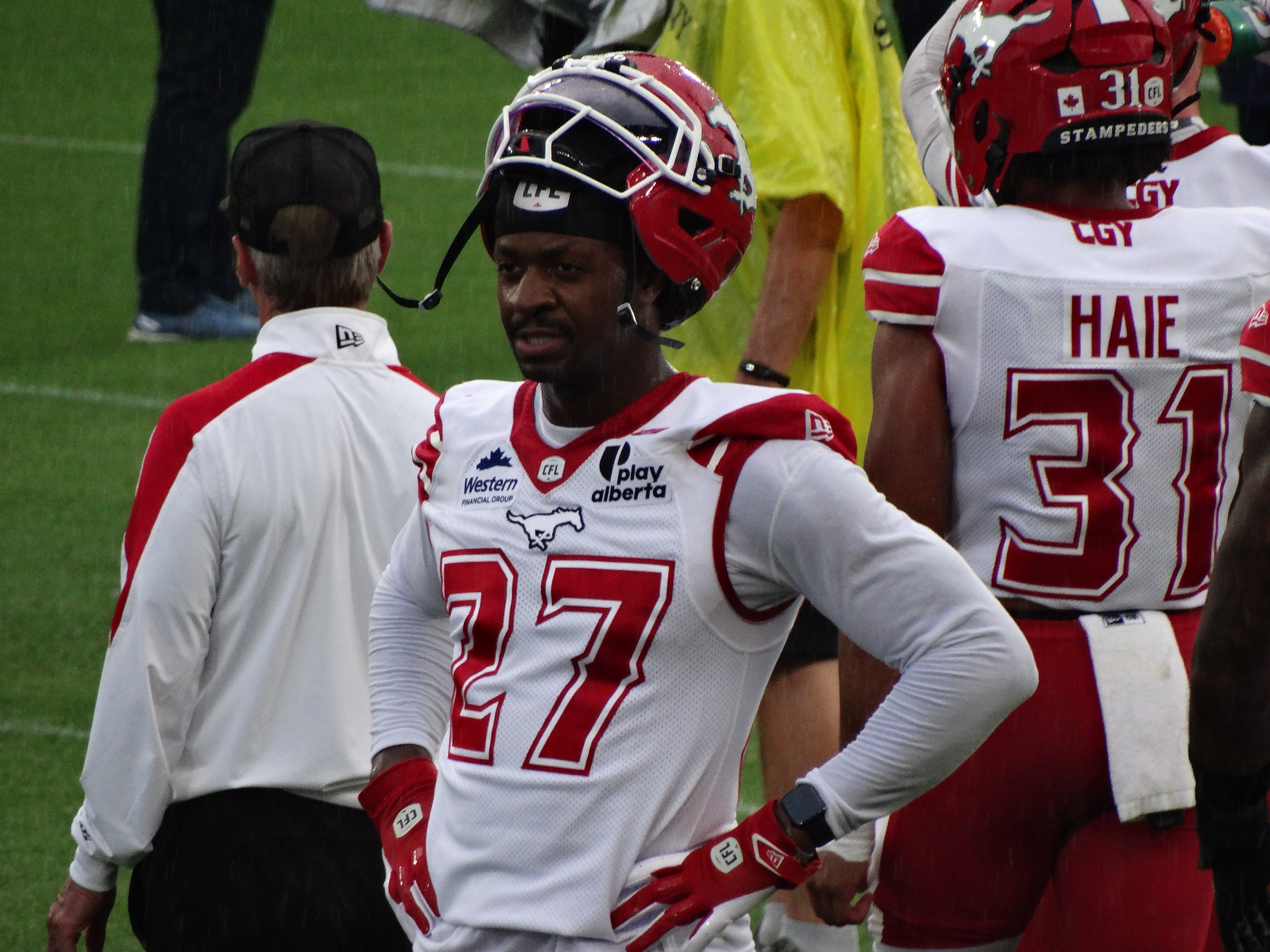
- Onyeka with the Calgary Stampeders in 2026

No. 27 – Calgary Stampeders
- Position: Defensive back
- Roster status: Active
- CFL status: National

Personal information
- Born: May 23, 1994 (age 32); Lagos, Nigeria
- Listed height: 6 ft 2 in (1.88 m)
- Listed weight: 216 lb (98 kg)

Career information
- High school: St. Edmund Campion
- University: Wilfrid Laurier
- CFL draft: 2018: 2nd round, 10th overall pick

Career history
- 2018–2020: Edmonton Eskimos
- 2021–2024: Saskatchewan Roughriders
- 2025–present: Calgary Stampeders

Awards and highlights
- 3× First-team All-Canadian (2015, 2016, 2017)
- Stats at CFL.ca

Godfrey Onyeka (born May 23, 1994) is a professional Canadian football defensive back for the Calgary Stampeders of the Canadian Football League (CFL).

== University career ==
Onyeka played U Sports football for the Wilfrid Laurier Golden Hawks from 2014 to 2017. He was a member of the Golden Hawks 2016 Yates Cup championship team and was a three-time U Sports First Team All-Canadian after winning the award in 2015, 2016, and 2017.

== Professional career ==
Pre-draft measurables
Height	Weight	40-yard dash	20-yard shuttle	Three-cone drill	Vertical jump	Broad jump	Bench press
6 ft 1 7/8 in (1.88 m)	208 lb (94 kg)	4.66 s	4.57 s	7.52 s	30.0 in (0.76 m)	9 ft 4 in (2.84 m)	15 reps
All values from CFL Combine

=== Edmonton Eskimos ===
In the CFL Scouting Bureau's Final Rankings, Onyeka was named the 10th best player available in the 2018 CFL draft. In alignment with his ranking, he was selected with the 10th overall pick in the draft by the Edmonton Eskimos and signed with the team on May 16, 2018. He made the team's roster following training camp and played in the team's season opening game on June 14, 2018, against the Winnipeg Blue Bombers. In his rookie year, he played in nine games where he made two defensive tackles.

In 2019, Onyeka played in all 18 regular season games where he recorded three defensive tackles and 13 special teams tackles. He also played in his first two post-season games, against the Montreal Alouettes in the Semi-Final and then the Hamilton Tiger-Cats in the Division Final, where he posted three defensive tackles and one special teams tackle over the two games. He did not play in 2020 due to the cancellation of the 2020 CFL season and he became a free agent on February 9, 2021.

=== Saskatchewan Roughriders ===
On the first day of free agency, on February 9, 2021, Onyeka signed with the Saskatchewan Roughriders. He made a career-high eight defensive tackles against the Winnipeg Blue Bombers on September 11, 2021, in the Banjo Bowl. On February 15, 2023, Onyeka re-signed with the Roughriders. He became a free agent upon the expiry of his contract on February 11, 2025.

=== Calgary Stampeders ===
On February 12, 2025, it was announced that the Calgary Stampeders had signed Onyeka.

== Personal life ==
Onyeka was born in Lagos, Nigeria to parents Jane and Godfrey Onyeka Sr. He moved with his family to Canada when he was 11 years old and grew up in Brampton, Ontario. His younger brother, Kene Onyeka, plays professionally in the CFL as a defensive lineman. His cousin, Nakas Onyeka, plays linebacker and was drafted by the Toronto Argonauts, and his other cousin, Kosi Onyeka, plays linebacker for the Guelph Gryphons.
