= Mike McAdoo =

American gridiron football player (born 1990)

No. 90, 66
- Position: Defensive end

Personal information
- Born: July 9, 1990 (age 36); Antioch, Tennessee, U.S.
- Listed height: 6 ft 7 in (2.01 m)
- Listed weight: 255 lb (116 kg)

Career information
- High school: Antioch (Antioch, Tennessee)
- College: North Carolina
- NFL draft: 2011: undrafted

Career history
- Baltimore Ravens (2011–2012); Winnipeg Blue Bombers (2013); Arizona Rattlers (2015); Dallas Cowboys (2015–2016)*; Hamilton Tiger-Cats (2017)*; Saskatchewan Roughriders (2017)*
- * Offseason or practice squad member only

Awards and highlights
- Super Bowl champion (XLVII); Second-team All-Arena (2015)

Career CFL statistics
- Total tackles: 1
- Sacks: 1
- Stats at CFL.ca

Career AFL statistics
- Total tackles: 35.5
- Sacks: 11
- Forced fumbles: 2
- Stats at ArenaFan.com
- Stats at Pro Football Reference

Michael McAdoo (born July 9, 1990) is an American former professional football player who was a defensive end in the National Football League (NFL) and Canadian Football League (CFL). He played college football for the North Carolina Tar Heels. He was signed by the Baltimore Ravens as an undrafted free agent in 2011.

== Early life ==
McAdoo attended Antioch High School in Antioch, Tennessee. He was selected to the all-state, all-area and all-district team after collecting 36 tackles including 13 sacks and 12 tackles for a loss in his junior season at high school. He was a finalist for Class 5A Mr. Football Lineman in his Senior year in high school.

He was an all-state performer for the high school basketball team in his junior year. He was ranked the No. 13 prospect in the state of Tennessee by SuperPrep. He was ranked among the top 50 defensive ends in the state of Tennessee by Scout.com.

== College career ==
McAdoo accepted a football scholarship to play defensive end at the University of North Carolina at Chapel Hill for the Tar Heels. In 2011, the NCAA declared him permanently ineligible for academic misconduct.

In July 2011, he filed a lawsuit against the NCAA and North Carolina, but the court denied his request to be reinstated for his senior season. He was mostly a backup player that finished with 3½ sacks in his two seasons.

== Professional career ==
=== Baltimore Ravens ===
On August 23, after the conclusion of the 2011 NFL Supplemental Draft, he was signed by the Baltimore Ravens as an undrafted free agent. On June 1, 2012, he tore his Achilles tendon in OTA's forcing him to miss the entire season. He was released on June 5, 2013, after the signing of Daryl Smith.

=== Winnipeg Blue Bombers ===
On October 10, 2013, he signed with the Winnipeg Blue Bombers of the Canadian Football League.

=== Arizona Rattlers ===
McAdoo finished the 2015 season with 29 tackles, 11 sacks, and 2 forced fumbles.

=== Dallas Cowboys ===
On December 30, 2015, he was signed by the Dallas Cowboys to the practice squad.

On January 4, 2016, he was re-signed to a reserve/future contract. On September 3, he was waived/injured by the Cowboys and was placed on the injured reserve list. On September 13, he was released with an injury settlement.

=== Hamilton Tiger-cats ===
On August 7, 2017, the Hamilton Tiger-cats (CFL) signed McAdoo to their practice roster.

=== Saskatchewan Roughriders ===
He was traded on August 18 to the Saskatchewan Roughriders (CFL) along with a 6th round draft pick in 2018 in exchange for wide receiver Ricky Collins Jr. and a seventh round pick in the 2018 CFL draft. He was released on August 25, 2017.
