= Simon Gingras-Gagnon =

Canadian football player (born 1994)

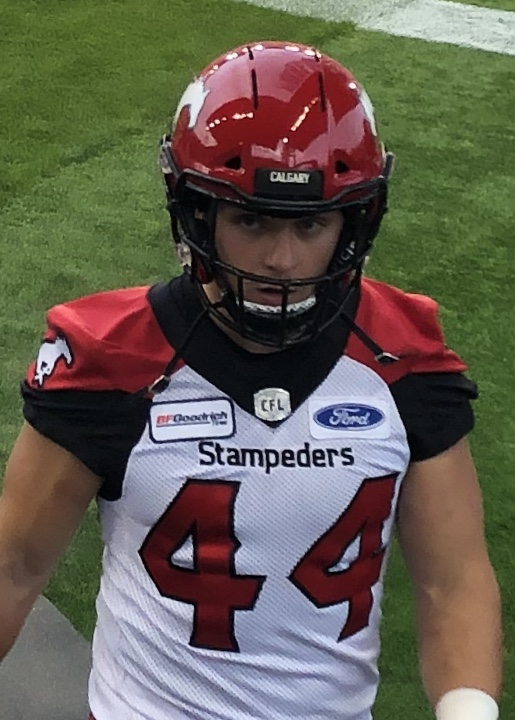
- Gingras-Gagnon with the Calgary Stampeders in 2019

Profile
- Position: Fullback

Personal information
- Born: April 1, 1994 (age 32); Quebec City, Quebec, Canada
- Listed height: 6 ft 0 in (1.83 m)
- Listed weight: 210 lb (95 kg)

Career information
- University: Laval; McGill
- CFL draft: 2018: 4th round, 35th overall pick

Career history
- 2018: Toronto Argonauts
- 2019–2020: Calgary Stampeders

Awards and highlights
- Vanier Cup champion (2016)
- Stats at CFL.ca

Simon Gingras-Gagnon (born April 1, 1994) is a Canadian former professional football fullback who played for the Toronto Argonauts and Calgary Stampeders of the Canadian Football League (CFL). He played university football for the McGill Redmen in 2014 and the Laval Rouge et Or in 2016 and 2017 where he was a member of the 52nd Vanier Cup championship team.

== Professional career ==
=== Toronto Argonauts ===
Gingras-Gagnon was originally drafted in the fourth round, 35th overall, by the Toronto Argonauts in the 2018 CFL draft and was signed on May 19, 2018. He made his professional debut on June 15, 2018 against the Saskatchewan Roughriders where he recorded one reception for three yards in the game. In total, he played in eight regular season games for the Argonauts in 2018 while spending the rest of the season on the injured list and practice roster. He was released during the team's 2019 training camp on June 5, 2019.

=== Calgary Stampeders ===
On July 9, 2019, Gingras-Gagnon signed with the Calgary Stampeders to a one-year contract. He played in all 15 remaining regular season games that year and one post-season game, recording eight special teams tackles. Shortly after the season ended, he re-signed with the Stampeders on November 26, 2019. However, he did not play in 2020 due to the cancellation of the 2020 CFL season and became a free agent on February 9, 2021.
