= Jackson Bennett =

Canadian football player (born 1996)

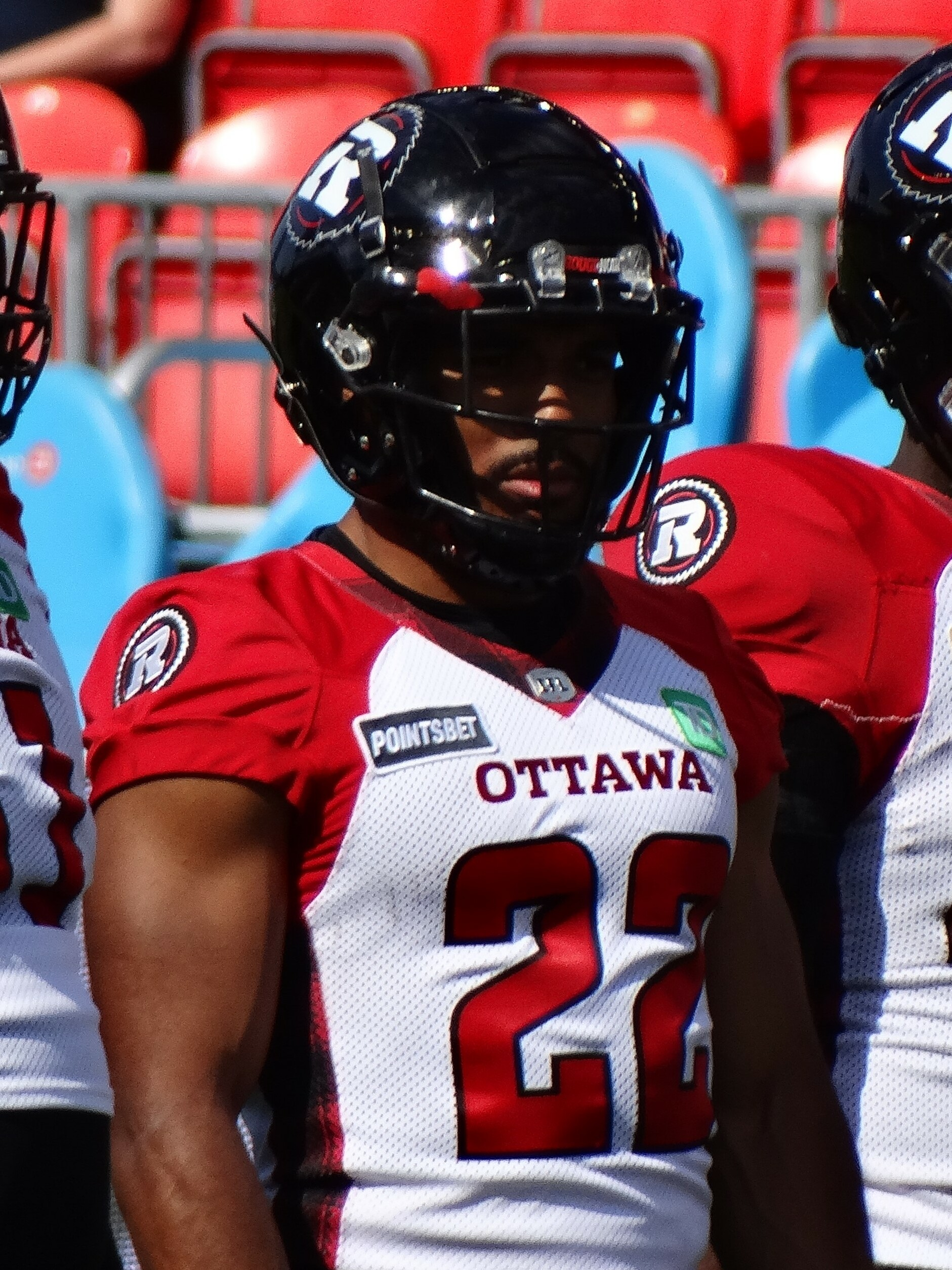
- Bennett with the Redblacks in 2022

Profile
- Position: Running back

Personal information
- Born: January 5, 1996 (age 30); Cumberland, Ontario, Canada
- Listed height: 5 ft 10 in (1.78 m)
- Listed weight: 212 lb (96 kg)

Career information
- High school: Sir Wilfrid Laurier
- University: Ottawa
- CFL draft: 2018: 2nd round, 11th overall pick

Career history
- 2018–2021: Hamilton Tiger-Cats
- 2022–2023: Ottawa Redblacks
- Stats at CFL.ca

Jackson Bennett (born January 5, 1996) is a Canadian former professional football running back who played for five seasons in the Canadian Football League (CFL) for the Hamilton Tiger-Cats and Ottawa Redblacks. He played U Sports football with the Ottawa Gee-Gees from 2014 to 2017.

== University career ==
Bennett played in 23 games for the Ottawa Gee-Gees in 2014, 2016, and 2017 as a defensive back and linebacker. Following shoulder surgery in August 2015, he sat out the 2015 season. Over those three seasons, he accumulated 89 solo tackles, 39 assisted tackles, one sack, and three interceptions, returning one for a touchdown. He was also featured on punt and kick returns, recording 40 kick returns for a 26.3-yard average with two touchdowns and 19 punt returns for a 10.0-yard average. In his final year with the Gee-Gees in 2017, he was named an OUA First Team All-Star on defence, an OUA Second Team All-Star on special teams, and was named the University of Ottawa Male Athlete of the year.

== Professional career ==
Pre-draft measurables
Height	Weight	40-yard dash	20-yard shuttle	Three-cone drill	Vertical jump	Broad jump	Bench press
5 ft 10 7/8 in (1.80 m)	212 lb (96 kg)	4.69 s	4.09 s	7.02 s	33.5 in (0.85 m)	9 ft 5 1/2 in (2.88 m)	22 reps
All values from CFL Combine

=== Hamilton Tiger-Cats ===
Bennett was drafted as a defensive back in the second round, 11th overall by the Hamilton Tiger-Cats in the 2018 CFL draft and signed with the team on May 20, 2018. He made the team following training camp and played in his first CFL game on June 16, 2018, against the Calgary Stampeders as a backup defensive back. In his first game, he returned three kickoffs for a 25.7-yard average. He recorded his first special teams tackle during the following game against the Edmonton Eskimos on June 22, 2018. He spent time on the injured list in 2018 and played in 11 games, recording eight special teams tackles. He earned his first career start, playing at the cover linebacker position, where he recorded three defensive tackles and one sack.

For the 2019 season, Bennett began training camp with the team's offence as a running back, a position that he had played in high school, indicating that the Tiger-Cats were planning on playing a Canadian there. He began the season as a backup running back and in the first game of the season, had three rushing attempts for -6 yards. He primarily played on special teams until injuries to Sean Thomas Erlington, Maleek Irons, and Cameron Marshall brought him into the spotlight for the Labour Day Classic against the Toronto Argonauts. In that game, he had 105 yards of total offence, with 12 carries for 77 yards and a touchdown and three catches for 28 yards. The 25-yard touchdown run was the first professional touchdown of his career and tied the game with the following convert proving to be the game-winning point.

Bennett signed a contract extension with the Tiger-Cats on December 29, 2020. However, he did not play in 2020 due to the cancellation of the 2020 CFL season. In 2021, he played in 13 regular season games, including one start at running back, where he had 17 carries for 72 yards and he also made four special teams tackles. He also played in all three post-season games, including the 108th Grey Cup, but the Tiger-Cats again lost to the Winnipeg Blue Bombers. He became a free agent upon the expiry of his contract on February 8, 2022.

=== Ottawa Redblacks ===
On February 8, 2022, it was announced that Bennett had signed with the Ottawa Redblacks. In his first season in Ottawa Bennett played in 14 games and carried the ball 50 times for 234 yards, he also caught 15 passes for 86 yards, returned eight kicks and recorded one special teams tackle. On December 14, Bennett and the Redblacks agreed to a contract extension.

In 2023, Bennett played in ten games, where he had 32 carries for 144 yards, five receptions for 51 receiving yards and a touchdown, and six kick returns for 154 yards. He announced his retirement in the following offseason on April 22, 2024.

== Personal life ==
Bennett grew up in Ottawa and has two siblings, older sister Dria and younger brother Carter.
