= Trumaine Washington =

American gridiron football player (born 1995)

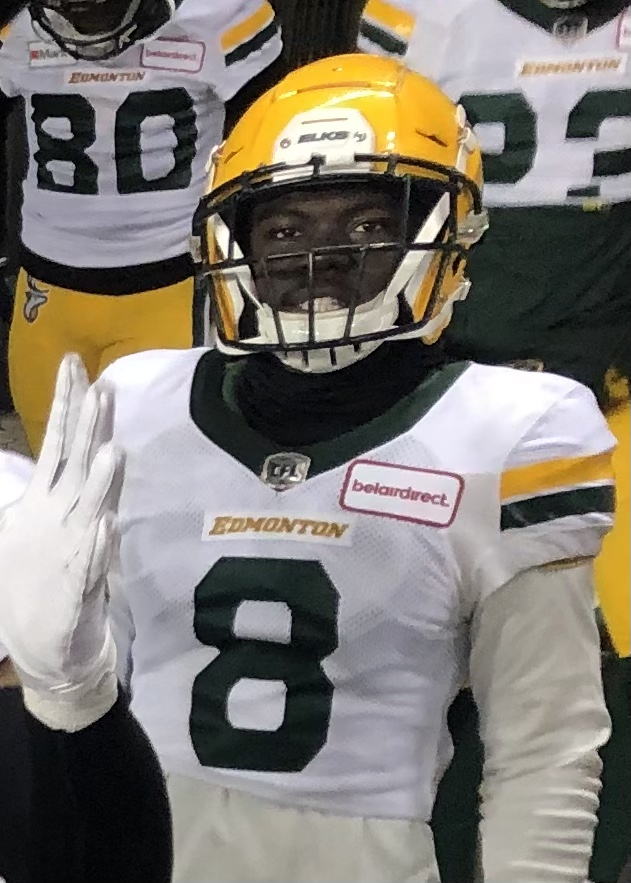
- Washington with the Edmonton Elks in 2021

No. 36, 8, 28
- Position: Cornerback

Personal information
- Born: June 10, 1995 (age 31); Miami, Florida, U.S.
- Listed height: 5 ft 9 in (1.75 m)
- Listed weight: 185 lb (84 kg)

Career information
- High school: Miami Killian (Miami-Dade County, Florida)
- College: Louisville (2014–2017)
- NFL draft: 2018: undrafted

Career history
- Toronto Argonauts (2018–2019); Edmonton Eskimos / Elks (2020–2021); Ottawa Redblacks (2022)*; Calgary Stampeders (2022); Orlando Guardians (2023); Saskatchewan Roughriders (2023)
- * Offseason or practice squad member only

Awards and highlights
- CFL interceptions leader (2021)
- Stats at CFL.ca

Trumaine Washington (born June 10, 1995) is an American former professional football defensive back. He played for the Toronto Argonauts, Edmonton Elks, Calgary Stampeders, Saskatchewan Roughriders of the Canadian Football League (CFL), as well as the Orlando Guardians of the XFL.

== College career ==
Washington played college football for the Louisville Cardinals from 2014 to 2017.

== Professional career ==
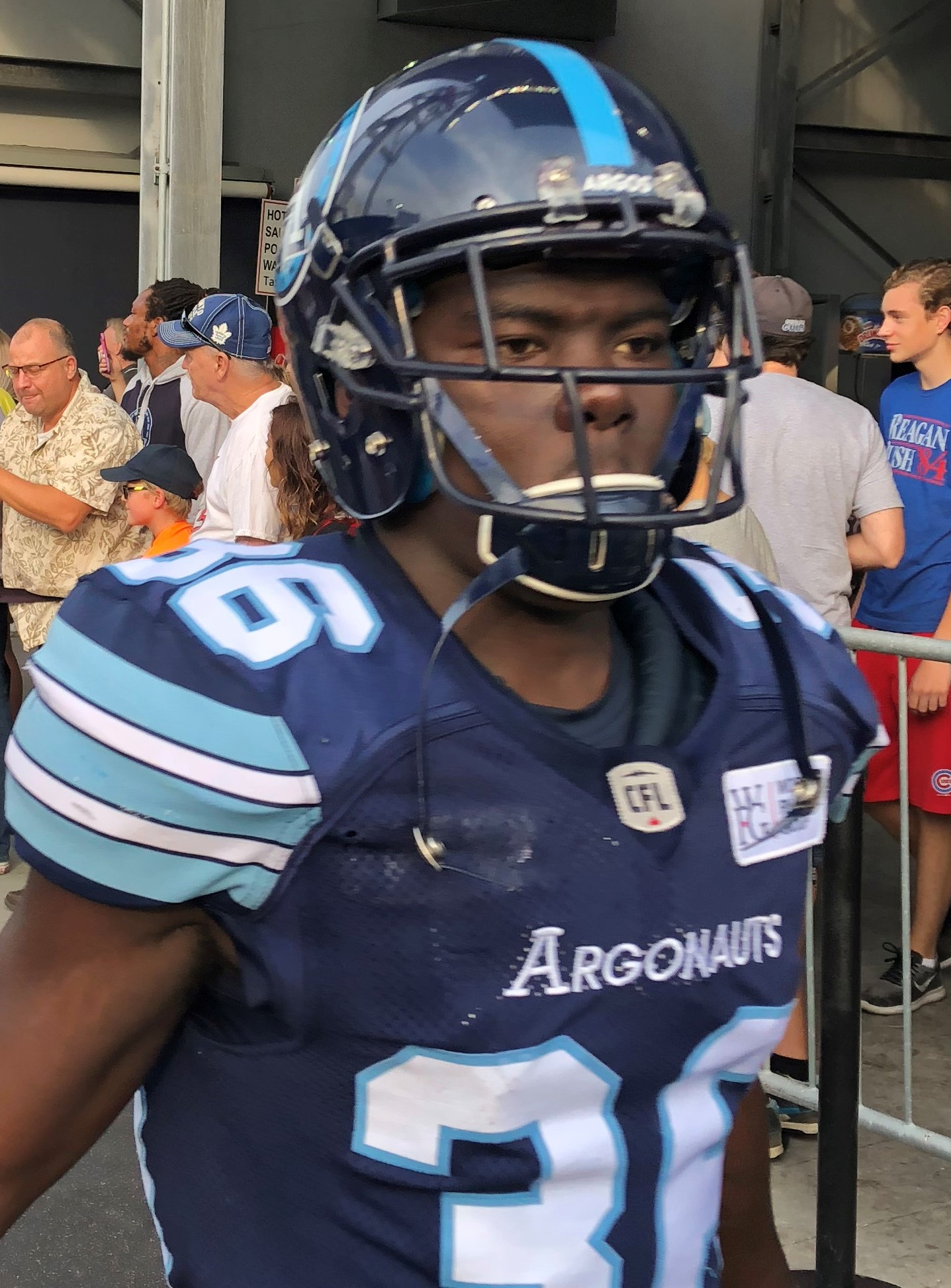
Washington with the Toronto Argonauts in 2018

=== Toronto Argonauts ===
Washington signed with the Toronto Argonauts as a free agent on May 21, 2018, and was assigned to the practice roster following training camp. He was promoted to the active roster for the July 21, 2018 game versus the Winnipeg Blue Bombers and earned his first start on August 2, 2018. He recorded his first professional interception and touchdown on September 22, 2018, against the Saskatchewan Roughriders. Over two seasons, he played in 25 regular season games recording 56 defensive tackles, five interceptions, and one touchdown. As a pending free agent in 2020, he was released during the free agency negotiation window on February 7, 2020.

=== Edmonton Eskimos / Elks ===
Washington signed with the Edmonton Eskimos on February 11, 2020. However, he did not play in 2020 due to the cancellation of the 2020 CFL season. He signed a contract extension with the team on December 30, 2020. He played in all 14 regular season games in 2021 for the newly named Edmonton Elks where he had 55 defensive tackles, five interceptions, one forced fumble, and one touchdown. He became a free agent upon the expiry of his contract on February 8, 2022.

=== Ottawa Redblacks ===
On February 10, 2022, it was announced that Washington had signed with the Ottawa Redblacks. After two preseason games with the Redblacks, he was released on June 5, 2022.

=== Calgary Stampeders ===
After being released by the Redblacks, Washington signed a one-year contract with the Calgary Stampeders on June 15, 2022. He played in 12 regular season games where he had 42 defensive tackles, two interceptions, and one touchdown. As a pending free agent during the following off-season, Washington was released on February 6, 2023.

=== Orlando Guardians ===
Washington signed with the Orlando Guardians of the XFL on February 15, 2023. He was released on July 21, 2023.

=== Saskatchewan Roughriders ===
Washington returned to Canada and signed to the practice squad of the Saskatchewan Roughriders on July 25, 2023. He played in four games in 2023. He announced his retirement on February 13, 2024.
