= 2018 CFL draft =

Canadian football draft

2018 CFL Draft

General information
- Sport: Canadian football
- Date: May 3
- Time: 8:00 pm EDT
- Location: Toronto
- Network: TSN/RDS

Overview
- 69 total selections in 8 rounds
- First selection: Mark Chapman WR, Hamilton Tiger-Cats
- Most selections: Montreal Alouettes (10)
- Fewest selections: Saskatchewan Roughriders (5)
- U Sports selections: 56
- NCAA selections: 13

The 2018 CFL draft took place on May 3, 2018, at 8:00 pm ET and was broadcast on TSN and RDS. Sixty-nine players were chosen from among eligible players from Canadian Universities across the country, as well as Canadian players playing in the NCAA.

The draft was broadcast live on TSN for two hours and then subsequent coverage shifted to digital platforms on TSN.ca and TSN GO. The production was hosted by Farhan Lalji and featured the CFL on TSN panel which includes Duane Forde, Dave Naylor, Davis Sanchez, and Justin Dunk. Randy Ambrosie, the CFL commissioner, was at the TSN studios to announce the picks for the first two rounds.

== Top prospects ==
Final Ranking	December Ranking	September Ranking	Player	Position	School	Hometown
1	3	3	Ryan Hunter	Offensive lineman	Bowling Green	North Bay, ON
2	10	–	Mark Chapman	Wide receiver	Central Michigan	Port Huron, MI, USA
3	11	14	Dakoda Shepley	Offensive lineman	UBC	Windsor, ON
4	2	2	Trey Rutherford	Offensive lineman	UConn	Markham, ON
5	1	1	David Knevel	Offensive lineman	Nebraska	Brantford, ON
6	12	–	Mark Korte	Offensive lineman	Alberta	Spruce Grove, AB
7	4	6	Peter Godber	Offensive lineman	Rice	Toronto, ON
8	5	10	Julien Laurent	Defensive lineman	Georgia State	Toronto, ON
9	7	12	Rashaun Simonise	Wide receiver	Calgary	Vancouver, BC
10	6	4	Godfrey Onyeka	Defensive back	Wilfrid Laurier	Barrie, ON
11	13	19	Jackson Bennett	Defensive back	Ottawa	Cumberland, ON
12	15	13	Andrew Pickett	Offensive lineman	Guelph	Kitchener, ON
13	18	16	Ryan Sceviour	Offensive lineman	Calgary	Calgary, AB
14	9	5	Darius Ciraco	Offensive lineman	Calgary	Burlington, ON
15	8	9	Regis Cibasu	Wide receiver	Montreal	Kinshasa, Congo
16	–	–	Bo Banner	Defensive lineman	Central Washington	Bellingham, WA, USA
17	–	–	Daniel Petermann	Wide receiver	McMaster	Stoney Creek, ON
18	–	–	David Mackie	Running back	Western	Jackson's Point, ON
19	–	–	Micah Teitz	Linebacker	Calgary	Calgary, AB
20	–	–	Isaiah Guzylak-Messam	Defensive back	Wilfrid Laurier	Hamilton, ON
–	14	8	Kene Onyeka	Defensive lineman	Carleton	Brampton, ON
–	16	15	Alex Taylor	Running back	Western	Winnipeg, MB
–	17	20	Nelkas Kwemo	Linebacker	Queen's	Montreal, QC
–	19	11	Christopher Amoah	Running back	Laval	Montreal, QC
–	20	–	David Brown	Offensive lineman	Western	London, ON
–	–	7	Tyrone Pierre	Wide receiver	Laval	Ottawa, ON
–	–	17	Keiler Cherry	Offensive lineman	Acadia	Lloydminster, AB
–	–	18	Jonathan Boissonneault-Glaou	Defensive lineman	Montreal	Lyster, QC

== Trades ==
In the explanations below, (D) denotes trades that took place during the draft, while (PD) indicates trades completed pre-draft.

=== Round one ===
- Montreal ←→ Hamilton (PD) Montreal traded the first, 31st, and 44th overall selections in this year's draft and a second-round pick in the 2019 CFL draft to Hamilton in exchange for the second, 34th, and 56th overall picks in this year's draft, Ryan Bomben, and Jamal Robinson.
- Edmonton → Hamilton (PD). Edmonton traded the sixth and 37th overall selections in this year's draft to Hamilton for the 10th and 20th overall selections in this year's draft.
- Winnipeg → BC (PD). Winnipeg traded seventh and 16th overall selections in this year's draft to BC for the 12th overall selection in this year's draft and BC's original first-round pick in the 2019 CFL draft.

=== Round two ===
- Edmonton → Hamilton (PD). Edmonton traded this selection to Hamilton for John Chick and a fifth-round pick in this year's draft.
- Montreal → Saskatchewan (PD) Montreal traded a second-round conditional selection and a fourth-round selection in the 2017 CFL draft to Saskatchewan for Darian Durant. This condition was fulfilled.
- Saskatchewan → Hamilton (PD). Saskatchewan traded the 10th overall selection to Hamilton for Zach Collaros.
- Hamilton → Edmonton (PD). Hamilton traded the 10th and 20th overall selections in this year's draft to Hamilton for the sixth and 37th overall selections in this year's draft.
- Winnipeg ←→ BC (PD). Winnipeg traded seventh and 16th overall selections in this year's draft to BC for the 12th overall selection in this year's draft and BC's original first-round pick in the 2019 CFL draft.

=== Round three ===
- Toronto → Winnipeg (PD). Toronto traded this selection, T. J. Heath, and a first-round pick in the 2017 CFL draft to Winnipeg for Drew Willy.
- Saskatchewan → Montreal (PD). Saskatchewan traded this selection, Tevaughn Campbell, and a third-round pick in the 2019 CFL draft to Montreal for Vernon Adams and a fifth-round pick in this year's draft.
- Edmonton → Toronto (PD). Edmonton traded this selection and James Franklin to Toronto for Mason Woods.
- Hamilton → Edmonton (PD). Hamilton traded the 10th and 20th overall selections in this year's draft to Hamilton for the sixth and 37th overall selections in this year's draft.

=== Round four ===
- Saskatchewan → Montreal (PD). Saskatchewan traded this selection to Montreal for Andrew Lue.
- Calgary → Hamilton (PD). Calgary traded this selection and Charleston Hughes to Hamilton for the 28th overall pick (fourth round) in this year's draft and a fourth-round pick in the 2019 CFL draft.
- Hamilton → Calgary (PD). Hamilton traded this selection and fourth-round pick in the 2019 CFL draft to Calgary for Charleston Hughes and the 34th overall pick (fourth round) in this year's draft.
- BC → Ottawa (PD). BC traded this selection and a negotiation list player to Ottawa for Odell Willis.
- Montreal ←→ Hamilton (PD) Montreal traded the first, 31st, and 44th overall selections in this year's draft and a second-round pick in the 2019 CFL draft to Hamilton in exchange for the second, 34th, and 56th overall picks in this year's draft, Ryan Bomben, and Jamal Robinson.
- Montreal → BC (D) Montreal traded the 34th overall selection in this year's draft to BC in exchange for the 38th and 46th overall picks in this year's draft.

=== Round five ===
- Ottawa → Calgary (PD). Ottawa traded this selection to Calgary for Drew Tate.
- Montreal → Saskatchewan (PD). Montreal traded this selection and Vernon Adams to Saskatchewan for Tevaughn Campbell, a third-round pick in this year's draft, and a third-round pick in the 2019 CFL draft.
- Hamilton → Edmonton (PD). Hamilton traded this selection and John Chick to Edmonton for a second-round pick in this year's draft.
- Edmonton → Hamilton (PD). Edmonton traded the sixth and 37th overall selections in this year's draft to Hamilton for the 10th and 20th overall selections in this year's draft.
- BC → Montreal (D) BC traded the 38th and 46th overall selections in this year's draft to Montreal in exchange for the 34th overall pick in this year's draft.

=== Round six ===
- Hamilton → Saskatchewan (PD). Hamilton traded this selection and Mike McAdoo to Saskatchewan for Ricky Collins and a seventh-round pick in this year's draft.
- Saskatchewan → BC (PD). Saskatchewan traded a conditional selection to BC for Mike Edem and a conditional selection in this year's draft. Edem's performance fulfilled a condition and BC was awarded a selection.
- Toronto → Montreal (PD). Toronto traded this conditional selection and a sixth-round selection in the 2017 CFL draft to Montreal for S. J. Green. Green's performance fulfilled the condition and Montreal was given this sixth-round pick.
- Montreal → Hamilton (PD) Montreal traded the first, 31st, and 44th overall selections in this year's draft and a second-round pick in the 2019 CFL draft to Hamilton in exchange for the second, 34th, and 56th overall picks in this year's draft, Ryan Bomben, and Jamal Robinson.
- BC → Montreal (D) BC traded the 38th and 46th overall selections in this year's draft to Montreal in exchange for the 34th overall pick in this year's draft.

=== Round seven ===
- Saskatchewan → Hamilton (PD). Saskatchewan traded this selection and Ricky Collins to Hamilton for Mike McAdoo and a sixth-round pick in this year's draft.
- Hamilton → Edmonton (PD). Hamilton traded this selection and a fifth-round pick in the 2019 CFL draft to Edmonton for Shamawd Chambers.
- Hamilton → Montreal (PD) Hamilton traded the second, 34th, and 56th overall picks in this year's draft, Ryan Bomben, and Jamal Robinson to Montreal in exchange for the first, 31st, and 44th overall selections in this year's draft and a second-round pick in the 2019 CFL draft.

=== Round eight ===
- Saskatchewan → Edmonton (PD). Saskatchewan traded this selection and a negotiation list player to Edmonton for Cedric McKinley and a negotiation list player.
- BC → Saskatchewan (PD). BC traded a conditional selection and Mike Edem to Saskatchewan for a conditional selection in this year's draft. BC was given Saskatchewan's sixth-round pick and Saskatchewan received BC's eighth.
- Edmonton→ Hamilton (PD). Edmonton traded an eighth-round conditional selection to Hamilton for Alex Hoffman-Ellis. Hoffman-Ellis' performance fulfilled the condition and Hamilton was awarded this pick.

=== Conditional trades ===
- Saskatchewan → Toronto (PD). Saskatchewan traded a conditional selection and Shawn Lemon to Toronto for Matt Sewell and Mitchell Gale.
- Saskatchewan → Winnipeg (PD). Saskatchewan traded a conditional selection to Winnipeg for Brett Blaszko.

== Forfeitures ==
- Winnipeg forfeits their third-round selection after selecting Drew Wolitarsky in the 2017 Supplemental Draft.
- Saskatchewan forfeits their fifth-round selection after selecting Brandyn Bartlett in the 2017 Supplemental Draft.
- Ottawa forfeits their sixth-round selection after selecting Austin Reuland in the 2017 Supplemental Draft.

== Draft order ==
=== Round one ===
Pick #	CFL team	Player	Position	School
1	Hamilton Tiger-Cats (via Montreal)	Mark Chapman	WR	Central Michigan
2	Montreal Alouettes (via Hamilton)	Trey Rutherford	OL	UConn
3	BC Lions	Peter Godber	OL	Rice
4	Ottawa Redblacks	Mark Korte	OL	Alberta
5	Saskatchewan Roughriders	Dakoda Shepley	OL	British Columbia
6	Hamilton Tiger-Cats (via Edmonton)	Darius Ciraco	OL	Calgary
7	BC Lions (via Winnipeg)	Julien Laurent	DL	Georgia State
8	Calgary Stampeders	Ryan Sceviour	OL	Calgary
9	Toronto Argonauts	Ryan Hunter	OL	Bowling Green

=== Round two ===
Pick #	CFL team	Player	Position	School
10	Edmonton Eskimos (via Hamilton via Saskatchewan via Montreal)	Godfrey Onyeka	DB	Wilfrid Laurier
11	Hamilton Tiger-Cats	Jackson Bennett	DB	Ottawa
12	Winnipeg Blue Bombers (via BC)	Rashaun Simonise	WR	Calgary
13	Ottawa Redblacks	Marco Dubois	WR	Laval
14	Saskatchewan Roughriders	Micah Teitz	LB	Calgary
15	Hamilton Tiger-Cats (via Edmonton)	Brett Wade	DL	Calgary
16	BC Lions (via Winnipeg)	David Mackie	RB	Western
17	Calgary Stampeders	Eric Mezzalira	LB	McMaster
18	Toronto Argonauts	Nelkas Kwemo	LB	Queen's

=== Round three ===
Pick #	CFL team	Player	Position	School
19	Montreal Alouettes	Bo Banner	DL	Central Washington
20	Toronto Argonauts (via Edmonton via Hamilton)	Régis Cibasu	WR	Montreal
21	BC Lions	David Knevel	OL	Nebraska
22	Ottawa Redblacks	Andrew Pickett	OL	Guelph
23	Montreal Alouettes (via Saskatchewan)	Jean-Gabriel Poulin	LB	Western
24	Edmonton Eskimos	Jordan Beaulieu	DB	Western
–	Winnipeg Blue Bombers	Forfeit pick		
25	Calgary Stampeders	Royce Metchie	DB	Guelph
26	Winnipeg Blue Bombers (via Toronto)	Daniel Petermann	WR	McMaster

=== Round four ===
Pick #	CFL team	Player	Position	School
27	Montreal Alouettes	K. C. Bakker	OT	Carleton
28	Calgary Stampeders (via Hamilton)	David Brown	OL	Western
29	Ottawa Redblacks (via BC)	Kene Onyeka	DL	Carleton
30	Ottawa Redblacks	Mickael Cote	LB	Concordia
31	Hamilton Tiger-Cats (via Montreal via Saskatchewan)	Marcus Davis	WR	British Columbia
32	Edmonton Eskimos	Tanner Green	RB	Concordia
33	Winnipeg Blue Bombers	Arnaud Gendron-Dumouchel	OL	Montreal
34	BC Lions (via Montreal via Hamilton via Calgary)	Isaiah Guzylak-Messam	DB	Wilfrid Laurier
35	Toronto Argonauts	Simon Gingras-Gagnon	FB	Laval

=== Round five ===
Pick #	CFL team	Player	Position	School
36	Saskatchewan Roughriders (via Montreal)	Mathieu Breton	DL	Bishop's
37	Hamilton Tiger-Cats (via Edmonton via Hamilton)	Justin Buren	WR	Simon Fraser
38	Montreal Alouettes (via BC)	Ryder Stone	RB	Dartmouth
39	Calgary Stampeders (via Ottawa)	Justin Lawrence	OL	Alberta
–	Saskatchewan Roughriders	Forfeit pick		
40	Edmonton Eskimos	Curtis Krahn	OL	Calgary
41	Winnipeg Blue Bombers	Tyrone Pierre	WR	Laval
42	Calgary Stampeders	Dagogo Maxwell	DB	British Columbia
43	Toronto Argonauts	Sean Harrington	LB	Michigan State

=== Round six ===
Pick #	CFL team	Player	Position	School
44	Hamilton Tiger-Cats (via Montreal)	Michael Moore	LB	Queen's
45	Saskatchewan Roughriders (via Hamilton)	Tresor Buama-Mafuta	DL	Saint Mary's
46	Montreal Alouettes (via BC)	Paul Kozachuk	LB	Toronto
–	Ottawa Redblacks	Forfeit pick		
47	BC Lions (via Saskatchewan)	Rashari Henry	DL	Wilfrid Laurier
48	Edmonton Eskimos	Alex Taylor	RB	Western
49	Winnipeg Blue Bombers	Matthew Ouellet De Carlo	OL	Bishop's
50	Calgary Stampeders	Atlee Simon	RB	Regina
51	Montreal Alouettes (via Toronto)	Étienne Moisan	WR	Laval

=== Round seven ===
Pick #	CFL team	Player	Position	School
52	Montreal Alouettes	Khadim Mbaye	LB	Ottawa
53	Edmonton Eskimos (via Hamilton)	Harry McMaster	WR	Western
54	BC Lions	William Watson	WR	British Columbia
55	Ottawa Redblacks	Justin Howell	DB	Carleton
56	Montreal Alouettes (via Hamilton via Saskatchewan)	Richmond Nketiah	WR	Waterloo
57	Edmonton Eskimos	Gabriel Bagnell	DL	Acadia
58	Winnipeg Blue Bombers	Jacob Firlotte	DB	Queen's
59	Calgary Stampeders	Gabriel Ferraro	K	Guelph
60	Toronto Argonauts	Mathieu Loiselle	LB	Wagner

=== Round eight ===
Pick #	CFL team	Player	Position	School
61	Montreal Alouettes	Lekan Idowu	DB	Windsor
62	Hamilton Tiger-Cats	Joel Van Pelt	DL	Calgary
63	Saskatchewan Roughriders (via BC)	Christopher Smith	OL	York
64	Ottawa Redblacks	Jacob Czaja	OL	St. Francis Xavier
65	Edmonton Eskimos (via Saskatchewan)	Blair Zerr	RB	Humboldt State
66	Hamilton Tiger-Cats (via Edmonton)	Nicholas Parisotto	DB	Guelph
67	Winnipeg Blue Bombers	Ben Koczwara	OL	Waterloo
68	Calgary Stampeders	Boston Rowe	LB	Calgary
69	Toronto Argonauts	Kain Anzovino	LS	Kent State
