= Nakas Onyeka =

Canadian football player (born 1994)

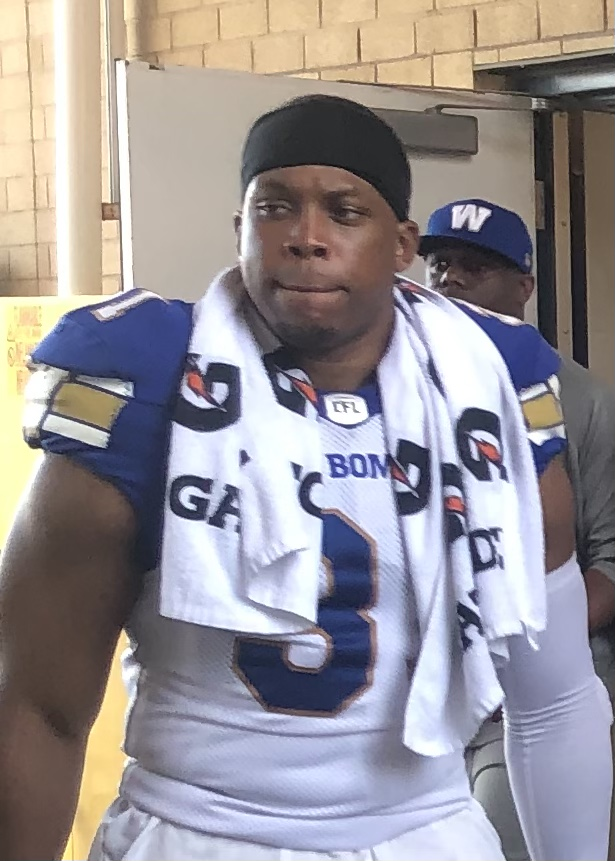
- Onyeka with the Winnipeg Blue Bombers in 2021

No. 41
- Position: Linebacker

Personal information
- Born: September 30, 1994 (age 32); Brampton, Ontario, Canada
- Listed height: 5 ft 10 in (1.78 m)
- Listed weight: 225 lb (102 kg)

Career information
- High school: St. Marguerite d'Youville
- University: Wilfrid Laurier
- CFL draft: 2017: 5th round, 36th overall pick

Career history
- 2017–2019: Toronto Argonauts
- 2020–2021: Saskatchewan Roughriders*
- 2021: Winnipeg Blue Bombers
- 2021: Saskatchewan Roughriders
- 2022: Edmonton Elks*
- * Offseason or practice squad member only
- Stats at CFL.ca

Nakas Onyeka (born September 30, 1994) is a Canadian former professional football linebacker who played four seasons in the Canadian Football League (CFL). He first played for the Toronto Argonauts for three seasons and was a member of the 105th Grey Cup championship team. He was also a member of the Saskatchewan Roughriders, Winnipeg Blue Bombers, and Edmonton Elks.

== University career ==
Onyeka played U Sports football with the Wilfrid Laurier Golden Hawks.

== Professional career ==
Pre-draft measurables
Height	Weight	40-yard dash	20-yard shuttle	Three-cone drill	Vertical jump	Broad jump	Bench press
5 ft 9 7/8 in (1.77 m)	202 lb (92 kg)	4.87 s	4.75 s	7.60 s	35.5 in (0.90 m)	9 ft 2 1/4 in (2.80 m)	16 reps
All values from CFL Combine

=== Toronto Argonauts ===
Onyeka was originally drafted 36th overall in the 2017 CFL draft by the Toronto Argonauts and signed with the team on May 24, 2017. He made his professional debut on June 25, 2017 against the Hamilton Tiger-Cats. Over three seasons, he played in 36 regular season games, recording 14 defensive tackles, 30 special teams tackles, two quarterback sacks, and one forced fumble. On May 4, 2020, Onyeka was released by the Argonauts.

=== Saskatchewan Roughriders ===
On May 19, 2020, Onyeka signed with the Saskatchewan Roughriders. He signed a one-year contract extension with the team on December 22, 2020. He was released on July 20, 2021.

=== Winnipeg Blue Bombers ===
On July 24, 2021, it was announced that Onyeka had signed with the Winnipeg Blue Bombers. He played in two games for the team and spent time on the practice roster before being released on October 4, 2021.

=== Saskatchewan Roughriders (II) ===
On October 28, 2021, it was announced that Onyeka had re-signed with the Saskatchewan Roughriders.

=== Edmonton Elks ===
Onyeka signed with the Edmonton Elks to open free agency on February 8, 2022. However, it was announced that he had retired on March 18, 2022.

== Personal life ==
Oneyka is the cousin of defensive end Kene Onyeka and defensive back Godfrey Onyeka, both of whom also play in the Canadian Football League. He is of Nigerian descent.
