= BC Lions all-time records and statistics =

Canadian football team statistics

The following is a list of BC Lions all time records and statistics current to the 2026 CFL season. Each category lists the top five players, where known, except for when the fifth place player is tied in which case all players with the same number are listed. Games and seasons played lists the top ten players.

== Grey Cup championships ==
As a player:

- 3 - Lui Passaglia

As a head coach:

- 2 - Wally Buono

== Games ==
Most games played

- 408 – Lui Passaglia (1976–2000)
- 265 – Jamie Taras (1987–2002)
- 233 – Al Wilson (1972–86)
- 223 – Norm Fieldgate (1954–67)
- 212 – Ryan Phillips (2005–16)
- 202 – Cory Mantyka (1993–2005)
- 197 – Jim Young (1967–79)
- 197 – Angus Reid (2001–12)
- 194 – Geroy Simon (2001–12)
- 192 – Glen Jackson (1976–87)

Most seasons played

- 25 – Lui Passaglia (1976–2000)
- 16 – Jamie Taras (1987–2002)
- 15 – Al Wilson (1972–86)
- 14 – Norm Fieldgate (1954–67)
- 13 – Jim Young (1967–79)
- 13 – Cory Mantyka (1993–2005)
- 13 – Bret Anderson (1997–2009)
- 12 – Greg Findlay (1962–73)
- 12 – Glen Jackson (1976–87)
- 12 – Angus Reid (2001–12)
- 12 – Geroy Simon (2001–12)
- 12 – Ryan Phillips (2005–16)
- 12 – Paul McCallum (1993–94, 2006–14, 2016)
- 12 – T. J. Lee III (2014–19, 2021–2026)

== Scoring ==
Most points – career

- 3991 – Lui Passaglia (1976–2000)
- 1506 – Paul McCallum (1993–94, 2006–14, 2016)
- 1005 – Sean Whyte – (2007–10, 2022–26)
- 570 – Ted Gerela (1967–73)
- 568 – Geroy Simon (2001–12)

Most points – season

- 214 – Lui Passaglia – 1987
- 210 – Lui Passaglia – 1991
- 203 – Paul McCallum – 2011
- 197 – Lui Passaglia – 1998
- 194 – Lui Passaglia – 1995
- 194 – Sean Whyte – 2023

Most points – game

- 25 – Willie Fleming – versus Saskatchewan Roughriders, October 29, 1960
- 24 – Larry Key – at Calgary Stampeders, Jul 31, 1981
- 24 – Mervyn Fernandez – 3 times
- 24 – Lui Passaglia – versus Toronto Argonauts, Sep 6, 1985
- 24 – Cory Philpot – versus Hamilton Tiger-Cats, Sep 16, 1995
- 24 – Alfred Jackson – versus Montreal Alouettes, Aug 4, 2001
- 24 – Sean Millington – versus Hamilton Tiger-Cats, Jul 18, 2002
- 24 – Geroy Simon – at Hamilton Tiger-Cats, Aug 13, 2004
- 24 – James Butler – versus Edmonton Elks, Jun 11, 2022
- 24 – Zander Horvath – at Ottawa Redblacks, Aug 30, 2026
- 24 – Sean Whyte – at Toronto Argonauts, October 3, 2026

Most touchdowns – career

- 94 – Geroy Simon (2001–12)
- 87 – Willie Fleming (1959–66)
- 78 – Sean Millington (1991–97, 2000–02)
- 68 – Jim Young (1967–79)
- 58 – Mervyn Fernandez (1982–86, 94)

Most touchdowns – season

- 22 – Cory Philpot (1995)
- 21 – Zander Horvath (2026)
- 20 – Jon Volpe (1991)
- 19 – Larry Key (1981)
- 19 – Joe Smith (2007)

Most touchdowns – game

- 4 – Willie Fleming – versus Saskatchewan Roughriders, October 29, 1960
- 4 – Larry Key – at Calgary Stampeders, Jul 31, 1981
- 4 – Mervyn Fernandez – versus Winnipeg Blue Bombers, Jul 6, 1984
- 4 – Mervyn Fernandez – at Ottawa Rough Riders, Oct 13, 1984
- 4 – Mervyn Fernandez – versus Calgary Stampeders, Aug 17, 1985
- 4 – David Williams – versus Edmonton Eskimos, Oct 29, 1988
- 4 – Cory Philpot – versus Hamilton Tiger-Cats, Sep 16, 1995
- 4 – Alfred Jackson – versus Montreal Alouettes, Aug 4, 2001
- 4 – Sean Millington – versus Hamilton Tiger-Cats, Jul 18, 2002
- 4 – Geroy Simon – at Hamilton Tiger-Cats, Aug 13, 2004
- 4 – James Butler – versus Edmonton Elks, Jun 11, 2022
- 4 – Zander Horvath – at Ottawa Redblacks, Aug 30, 2026

Most rushing touchdowns – career

- 66 – Sean Millington – (1991–97, 2000–02)
- 47 – Larry Key – (1978–82)
- 42 – Cory Philpot – (1993–97)
- 38 – Willie Fleming – (1959–66)
- 32 – Jim Evenson – (1968–72)
- 32 – Robert Drummond – (1998–2001)

Most rushing touchdowns – season

- 19 – Joe Smith (2007)
- 18 – Zander Horvath (2026)
- 17 – Cory Philpot (1995)
- 17 – Larry Key (1981)
- 16 – Jon Volpe (1991)

Most rushing touchdowns – game

- 4 – Larry Key – at Calgary Stampeders, Jul 31, 1981
- 4 – Sean Millington – versus Hamilton Tiger-Cats, Jul 18, 2002
- 4 – Zander Horvath – at Ottawa Redblacks, Aug 30, 2026

Most receiving touchdowns – career

- 93 – Geroy Simon – (2001–12)
- 65 – Jim Young – (1967–79)
- 57 – Mervyn Fernandez – (1982–86, 94)
- 55 – Emmanuel Arceneaux – (2009–10, 2013–18)
- 46 – Mike Trevathan – (1991–97)

Most receiving touchdowns – season

- 18 – David Williams (1988)
- 17 – Mervyn Fernandez (1984)
- 15 – Mervyn Fernandez (1985)
- 15 – Geroy Simon (2006)

Most receiving touchdowns – game

- 4 – Mervyn Fernandez – versus Winnipeg Blue Bombers, Jul 6, 1984
- 4 – Mervyn Fernandez – at Ottawa Rough Riders, Oct 13, 1984
- 4 – Mervyn Fernandez – versus Calgary Stampeders, Aug 17, 1985
- 4 – David Williams – versus Edmonton Eskimos, Oct 29, 1988
- 4 – Alfred Jackson – versus Montreal Alouettes, Aug 4, 2001
- 4 – Geroy Simon – at Hamilton Tiger-Cats, Aug 13, 2004

== Passing ==
Most passing yards – career

- 27,621 – Damon Allen – (1996–2002)
- 26,718 – Roy Dewalt – (1980–87)
- 21,352 – Travis Lulay – (2009–18)
- 16,675 – Joe Kapp – (1961–66)
- 15,788 - Nathan Rourke – (2021–22, 2024–26)

Most passing yards – season

- 6,619 – Doug Flutie – 1991
- 5,496 – Dave Dickenson – 2003
- 5,290 – Nathan Rourke – 2025
- 5,226 – Jonathon Jennings – 2016
- 5,088 – Casey Printers – 2004

Most passing yards – game

- 601 – Danny Barrett – versus Toronto Argonauts, August 12, 1993
- 582 – Doug Flutie – versus Edmonton Eskimos, October 12, 1991
- 523 – Kent Austin – versus Toronto Argonauts, August 11, 1994
- 509 – Dave Dickenson – versus Ottawa Renegades, July 18, 2003
- 504 – Roy Dewalt – versus Winnipeg Blue Bombers, October 6, 1985

Most passing attempts – career

- 3,421 – Damon Allen – (1996–2002)
- 2,898 – Roy Dewalt – (1980–87)
- 2,613 – Travis Lulay – (2009–18)
- 2,044 – Joe Kapp – (1961–66)
- 1,559 – Nathan Rourke – (2021–22, 2024–26)

Most passing attempts – season

- 730 – Doug Flutie – 1991
- 597 – Matt Dunigan – 1989
- 583 – Damon Allen – 1997
- 583 – Travis Lulay – 2011

Most passing attempts – game

- 57 – Damon Allen – versus Hamilton Tiger-Cats, September 6, 1997
- 56 – Tony Kimbrough – versus Hamilton Tiger-Cats, August 6, 1992
- 55 – Doug Flutie – versus Edmonton Eskimos, October 23, 1991

Most passing completions – career

- 2,037 – Damon Allen – (1996–2002)
- 1,705 – Roy Dewalt – (1980–87)
- 1,658 – Travis Lulay – (2009–18)
- 1,108 – Nathan Rourke – (2021–22, 2024–26)
- 1,089 – Joe Kapp – (1961–66)

Most passing completions – season

- 466 – Doug Flutie – 1991
- 378 – Damon Allen – 1997
- 371 – Jonathon Jennings – 2016
- 370 – Dave Dickenson – 2003
- 352 – Nathan Rourke – 2025

Most passing completions – game

- 39 – Nathan Rourke – versus Toronto Argonauts, June 25, 2022
- 39 – Nathan Rourke – at Calgary Stampeders, August 13, 2022
- 38 – Buck Pierce – at Montreal Alouettes, August 29, 2008
- 37 – Doug Flutie – at Saskatchewan Roughriders, August 21, 1991

Most passing touchdowns – career

- 136 – Damon Allen – (1996–2002)
- 129 – Roy Dewalt – (1980–87)
- 127 – Travis Lulay – (2009–18)
- 97 – Joe Kapp – (1961–66)
- 90 – Dave Dickenson – (2003–07)

Most passing touchdowns – season

- 38 – Doug Flutie – (1991)
- 36 – Dave Dickenson – (2003)
- 35 – Casey Printers – (2004)
- 32 – Travis Lulay – (2011)
- 31 – Vernon Adams – (2023)
- 31 – Nathan Rourke – (2025)

Most passing touchdowns – game

- 6 – Joe Kapp – at Edmonton Eskimos, September 29, 1962
- 6 – Dave Dickenson – at Ottawa Renegades, July 18, 2003
- 5 – Doug Flutie – versus Saskatchewan Roughriders, August 21, 1991
- 5 – Dave Dickenson – versus Hamilton Tiger-Cats, August 22, 2003
- 5 – Dave Dickenson – versus Saskatchewan Roughriders, June 16, 2006
- 5 – Jarious Jackson – at Winnipeg Blue Bombers, July 11, 2008
- 5 – Mike Reilly – versus Toronto Argonauts, October 5, 2019
- 5 – Nathan Rourke – versus Edmonton Elks, August 6, 2022

Most 300+ Yard Games – career

- 32 – Nathan Rourke – (2021–22, 2024–26)
- 27 – Damon Allen – (1996–2002)
- 24 – Roy Dewalt – (1980–87)

Most 300+ Yard Games – Season

- 14 – Doug Flutie – (1991)
- 12 – Nathan Rourke – (2025)
- 11 – Nathan Rourke – (2026)
- 10 – Dave Dickenson – (2003)
- 10 – Vernon Adams – (2023)

== Rushing ==
Most rushing attempts – career

- 1,151 – Jim Evenson – (1968–72)
- 933 – Sean Millington – (1991–97, 2000–02)
- 914 – John Henry White – (1978–87)
- 887 – Larry Key – (1978–82)
- 868 – Willie Fleming – (1959–66)

Most rushing attempts – season

- 281 – Joe Smith – 2007
- 260 – Jim Evenson – 1971
- 257 – Robert Drummond – 1999
- 255 – Jim Evenson – 1969
- 248 – Jim Evenson – 1968

Most rushing attempts – game

- 32 – Jim Evenson – versus Winnipeg Blue Bombers, October 19, 1968
- 30 – James Butler – at Edmonton Elks, July 13, 2025
- 28 – Robert Drummond – at Hamilton Tiger-Cats, August 19, 1999

Most rushing yards – career

- 6,125 – Willie Fleming – (1959–66)
- 5,708 – Jim Evenson – (1968–72)
- 4,984 – Sean Millington – (1991–97, 2000–02)
- 4,715 – John Henry White – (1978–87)
- 4,532 – Larry Key – (1978–82)

Most rushing yards – season

- 1,510 – Joe Smith – 2007
- 1,451 – Cory Philpot – 1994
- 1,395 – Jon Volpe – 1991
- 1,309 – Robert Drummond – 1999
- 1,308 – Cory Philpot – 1995

Most rushing yards – game

- 213 – Martell Mallett – versus Montreal Alouettes, Sept 4, 2009
- 212 – Sean Millington – at Saskatchewan Roughriders, August 15, 1997
- 206 – Keyvan Jenkins – at Toronto Argonauts, August 1, 1985
- 202 – Lou Harris – versus Winnipeg Blue Bombers, August 8, 1974
- 197 – Jim Evenson – at Winnipeg Blue Bombers, October 26, 1969

Longest run

- 109 – Willie Fleming – at Edmonton Eskimos, October 17, 1964
- 98 – Willie Fleming – at Edmonton Eskimos, September 19, 1960
- 97 – Willie Fleming – at Calgary Stampeders, October 20, 1962
- 97 – Willie Fleming – versus Calgary Stampeders, September 7, 1963
- 97 – Willie Fleming – at Winnipeg Blue Bombers, October 27, 1963

== Receiving ==
Most receiving yards – career

- 14,756 – Geroy Simon – (2001–12)
- 9,248 – Jim Young – (1967–79)
- 8,169 – Emmanuel Arceneaux – (2009–10, 2013–18)
- 7,212 – Bryan Burnham – (2014–19, 2021–22)
- 6,690 – Mervyn Fernandez – (1982–86, 1994)

Most receiving yards – season

- 1,856 – Geroy Simon – 2006
- 1,750 – Geroy Simon – 2004
- 1,731 – Darren Flutie – 1994
- 1,727 – Mervyn Fernandez – 1985
- 1,688 – Keon Hatcher – 2025

Most receiving yards – game

- 270 – Tyrone Gray – at Edmonton Eskimos, September 12, 1981
- 266 – Alfred Jackson – versus Winnipeg Blue Bombers, July 18, 1997
- 259 – Mervyn Fernandez – versus Calgary Stampeders, August 17, 1985
- 251 – Darren Flutie – at Baltimore CFLers, October 22, 1994
- 247 – Alfred Jackson – versus Montreal Alouettes, August 21, 2002

Most receptions – career

- 904 – Geroy Simon – (2001–12)
- 556 – Emmanuel Arceneaux – (2009–10, 2013–18)
- 552 – Jim Young – (1967–79)
- 476 – Bryan Burnham – (2014–19, 2021–22)
- 428 – Jason Clermont – (2002–08)

Most receptions – season

- 111 – Darren Flutie – 1994
- 105 – Geroy Simon – 2006
- 105 – Emmanuel Arceneaux – 2016
- 104 – Ray Alexander – 1991
- 103 – Geroy Simon – 2004

Most receptions – game

- 14 – Eric Streater – 1989
- 14 – Lorenzo Graham – 1990
- 14 – Ray Alexander – 1991
- 14 – Darren Flutie – 1994
- 14 – Justin McInnis – 2024

== Interceptions ==
Most interceptions – career

- 51 – Larry Crawford – (1981–89)
- 47 – Ryan Phillips – (2005–16)
- 37 – Norm Fieldgate – (1954–67)
- 36 – Barron Miles – (2005–09)
- 34 – Keith Gooch – (1984–89)

Most interceptions – season

- 12 – Larry Crawford – 1983
- 12 – Ryan Phillips – 2007
- 11 – Less Browne – 1994
- 10 – Rich Robinson – 1970
- 10 – Steve Muhammad – 1998
- 10 – Barron Miles – 2006

Most interceptions – game

- 3 – Primo Villanueva – 1955
- 3 – Paul Cameron – 1958
- 3 – Norm Fieldgate – 1962
- 3 – Rich Robinson – 1969
- 3 – Wayne Matherne – 1971
- 3 – Larry Crawford – 1981
- 3 – Larry Crawford – 1983
- 3 – Melvin Byrd – 1985
- 3 – Eric Carter – 1999

Most interception return yards – career

- 816 – Ryan Phillips – (2005–16)
- 790 – Larry Crawford – (1981–89)
- 580 – Melvin Byrd – (1982–87)
- 529 – Barron Miles – (2005–09)
- 511 – Jerry Bradley – (1968–70)

Most interception return yards – season

- 299 – Ryan Phillips – 2007
- 206 – Barron Miles – 2006
- 188 – Jerry Bradley – 1970

Most interception return yards – game

- 129 – Melvin Byrd – versus Ottawa Rough Riders, August 11, 1984
- 120 – Neal Beaumont – versus Saskatchewan Roughriders, October 12, 1963
- 117 – Tony Walker – versus Saskatchewan Roughriders, November 1, 2002

Longest interception return

- 120 – Neal Beaumont – versus Saskatchewan Roughriders, October 12, 1963
- 115 – Melvin Byrd – versus Ottawa Rough Riders, August 11, 1984
- 107 – Melvin Byrd – at Calgary Stampeders, October 16, 1983

== Tackles (since 1987) ==
Most defensive tackles – career

- 745 – Solomon Elimimian – (2010–18)
- 675 – T. J. Lee – (2014–19, 2021–26)
- 587 – Dante Marsh – (2004–14)
- 509 – Adam Bighill – (2011–16)
- 489 – Ryan Phillips – (2005–16)

Most defensive tackles – season

- 144 – Solomon Elimimian – 2017
- 143 – Solomon Elimimian – 2014
- 129 – Solomon Elimimian – 2016
- 121 – Adam Bighill – 2015
- 115 – Alondra Johnson – 1989
- 115 – Barrin Simpson – 2001

Most defensive tackles – game

- 15 – Solomon Elimimian – at Montreal Alouettes, July 6, 2017
- 14 – Solomon Elimimian – at Toronto Argonauts, August 31, 2016
- 13 – Tracy Gravely – versus Saskatchewan Roughriders, August 13, 1992
- 13 – Adam Bighill – at Saskatchewan Roughriders, September 29, 2012
- 13 – Dante Marsh – at Saskatchewan Roughriders, September 22, 2013
- 13 – Adam Bighill – versus Toronto Argonauts, July 24, 2015
- 13 – Solomon Elimimian – versus Ottawa Redblacks, October 1, 2016
- 13 – Solomon Elimimian – versus Ottawa Redblacks, October 8, 2017

Most special team tackles – career

- 190 – Jason Arakgi – (2008–16)
- 140 – Sean Millington – (1991–97, 2000–02)
- 118 – Kelly Lochbaum – (1997–2000, 2002–05)
- 104 – Rolly Lumbala – (2008–18)
- 89 – Javier Glatt – (2003–09)

Most special team tackles – season

- 35 – Mike Maurer – 2001
- 35 – Jason Arakgi – 2009
- 32 – Jason Arakgi – 2008

Most special team tackles – game

- 6 – Steve Glenn – versus Toronto Argonauts, July 24, 1997
- 6 – Chuck Levy – versus Winnipeg Blue Bombers, October 9, 2000
- 6 – Mike Maurer – versus Edmonton Eskimos, August 11, 2001
- 6 – Chandler Fenner – versus Edmonton Eskimos, October 21, 2017

== Quarterback sacks ==
Most sacks – career

- 89 – Brent Johnson – (2001–11)
- 82.5 – James Parker – (1984–89)
- 64 – Rick Klassen – (1981–87, 1989–90)
- 56 – Mack Moore – (1981–84, 1988–89)
- 51 – Mathieu Betts – (2022–26)

Most sacks – season

- 26.5 – James Parker – 1984
- 23 – Gregg Stumon – 1987
- 23 – Cameron Wake – 2008
- 22 – James Parker – 1986
- 20 – O. J. Brigance – 1993

Most sacks – game

- 5 – Mack Moore – at Ottawa Rough Riders, September 3, 1982
- 5 – Daved Benefield – versus Birmingham Barracudas, August 3, 1995
- 4 – Brent Johnson – versus Saskatchewan Roughriders, November 5, 2005
- 4 – Cameron Wake – at Hamilton Tiger-Cats, September 6, 2008
- 4 – Mathieu Betts – versus Ottawa Redblacks, September 12, 2025

== Punt returns ==
Most punt return yards – career

- 4,058 – Larry Crawford – (1981–89)
- 3,078 – Chris Rainey – (2015–18, 2021)
- 2,554 – Darnell Clash – (1984–87)
- 2,404 – Tim Brown – (2011–14)
- 2,076 – Ian Smart – (2006–09)

Most punt return yards – season

- 1,148 – Darnell Clash – 1985
- 942 – Chris Rainey – 2016

Most punt return yards – game

- 201 – Darnell Clash – versus Saskatchewan Roughriders, August 9, 1986
- 189 – Aaron Lockett – at Calgary Stampeders, September 24, 2004
- 180 – Larry Crawford – versus Winnipeg Blue Bombers, September 20, 1987

Longest punt return – game

- 108 – Leon Bright – at Saskatchewan Roughriders, October 30, 1977
- 108 – Tony Hunter – at Saskatchewan Roughriders, September 30, 1990

== Kickoff returns ==
Most kickoff return yards – career

- 5,743 – Chris Rainey – (2015–18, 2021)
- 3,987 – Tim Brown – (2011–14)
- 3,756 – Ian Smart – (2006–09)
- 3,352 – Terry Williams – (2022–24)
- 3,114 – Byron Bailey – (1954–64)

Most kickoff return yards – season

- 1,805 – Ian Smart – 2008
- 1,671 – Chris Rainey – 2017

Most kickoff return yards – game

- 257 – Anthony Cherry – at Hamilton Tiger-Cats, August 4, 1989
- 226 – Brandon Rutley – versus Winnipeg Blue Bombers, June 15, 2019
- 218 – Chris Rainey – at Winnipeg Blue Bombers, July 7, 2018

Longest kickoff return – game

- 113 – Sammy Greene – at Hamilton Tiger-Cats, July 30, 1983
- 110 – Monroe Eley – versus Hamilton Tiger-Cats, July 25, 1974
- 108 – Brandon Rutley – versus Winnipeg Blue Bombers, June 15, 2019

== Field goals ==
Most field goals – career

- 875 – Lui Passaglia (1976–2000)
- 348 – Paul McCallum (1993–94, 2006–14, 2016)
- 245 – Sean Whyte (2007–10, 2022–26)
- 123 – Ted Gerela (1967–73)
- 82 – Ty Long (2017–18)

Most field goals – season

- 52 – Lui Passaglia – 1987
- 52 – Lui Passaglia – 1998
- 50 – Paul McCallum – 2011
- 50 – Sean Whyte – 2023
- 50 – Sean Whyte – 2024

Most field goals – game

- 8 – Sean Whyte – versus Toronto Argonauts, October 3, 2026
- 7 – Lui Passaglia – versus Toronto Argonauts, September 6, 1995
- 7 – Lui Passaglia – at Saskatchewan Roughriders, October 25, 1998
- 7 – Sean Whyte – versus Saskatchewan Roughriders, July 13, 2024

Highest field goal accuracy – career (minimum 75 attempts)

- 91.4% (245/268) – Sean Whyte – (2007–10, 2022–26)
- 88.2% (82/93) – Ty Long (2017–18)
- 85.9% (348/405) – Paul McCallum (1993–94, 2006–14, 2016)
- 72.7% (875/1,203) – Lui Passaglia (1976–2000)
- 72.2% (65/90) – Richie Leone (2015–16)

Highest field goal accuracy – season (minimum 30 attempts)

- 95.1% (39/41) – Sean Whyte – 2025
- 94.3% (50/53) – Paul McCallum – 2011
- 94.3% (50/53) – Sean Whyte – 2023
- 94.3% (50/53) – Sean Whyte – 2024
- 92.3% (36/39) – Sean Whyte – 2022

Longest field goal

- 56 – Richie Leone – versus Saskatchewan Roughriders, July 10, 2015
- 54 – Lui Passaglia – four times, most recently at Edmonton Eskimos, October 20, 1991
- 54 – Matt Kellett – at Winnipeg Blue Bombers, August 9, 2002
- 54 – Curtis Head – at Saskatchewan Roughriders, June 28, 2003

Most consecutive field goals

- 47 – Sean Whyte (September 16, 2023 – August 24, 2024)
- 32 – Sean Whyte (September 28, 2025 – August 7, 2025)
- 30 – Paul McCallum (July 16, 2011 – October 8, 2011)
- 24 – Paul McCallum (October 9, 2009 – July 30, 2010)
- 23 – Paul McCallum (July 12, 2014 – September 13, 2014)
- 23 – Sean Whyte (June 17, 2023 – August 20, 2023)
- 23 – Sean Whyte (August 8, 2026 – October 3, 2026)

== Other sources ==
- BC Lions individual records
- 2024 BC Lions media guide
- CFL Guide & Record Book, 2024 Edition
- 2024 Game Notes
