= 2025 BC Lions season =

CFL team season

- General manager: Ryan Rigmaiden
- President: Duane Vienneau
- Head coach: Buck Pierce
- Home stadium: BC Place

Results
- Record: 11–7
- Division place: 2nd, West
- Playoffs: Lost West Final
- Team MOP: Nathan Rourke
- Team MODP: Mathieu Betts
- Team MOC: Nathan Rourke
- Team MOOL: Jarell Broxton
- Team MOST: Sean Whyte
- Team MOR: Robert Carter Jr.

Uniform
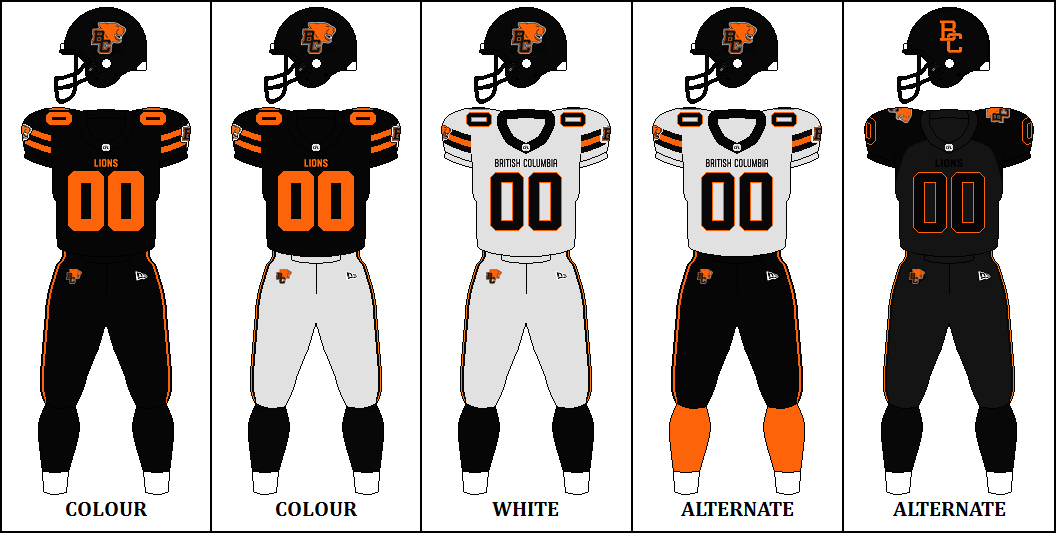

The 2025 BC Lions season was the 67th season for the team in the Canadian Football League (CFL) and their 71st overall. The Lions qualified for the playoffs for the fourth straight year following their week 18 victory over the Calgary Stampeders. The team attempted to win their seventh Grey Cup championship, but were eliminated in the West Final by the Saskatchewan Roughriders.

The 2025 CFL season is the first season for Buck Pierce as the team's head coach after Rick Campbell was fired on November 20, 2024, following four seasons with the team. This is also the first season with Ryan Rigmaiden as the team's general manager with Neil McEvoy being promoted to vice-president of football operations.

The BC Lions drew an average home attendance of 27,124, the 3rd highest of all Canadian football teams in the world.

== Offseason ==
=== CFL global draft ===
The 2025 CFL global draft took place on April 29, 2025. The Lions had two selections in the draft, holding the fourth pick in each round.

Round	Pick	Player	Position	School	Nationality
1	4	Ross Bolger	K/P	Idaho State	Ireland
2	13	Mark McNamee	K	No college	Ireland

== CFL national draft ==
The 2025 CFL draft took place on April 29, 2025. The Lions had seven selections in the eight-round draft. The team forfeited the highest of their first-round and second-round picks (third and ninth overall) after exceeding the salary cap by more than $200,000 ($347,889). However, they received an additional second round pick (19th overall) after finishing the previous season with the second-highest national snaps. Not including traded picks of forfeitures, the team selected fourth in each round of the draft after finishing sixth in the 2024 league standings.

Round	Pick	Player	Position	School	Hometown
2	11	Hayden Harris	DL	Montana	Mill Creek, WA, USA
2	16	Jackson Findlay	DB	Western	North Vancouver, BC
4	37	Connor Klassen	OL	Regina	Regina, SK
5	41	Dre Doiron	OL	Kansas	London, ON
6	50	Chase Tataryn	LB	Alberta	Saskatoon, SK
7	59	Alex Berwick	OL	Western	Clarence Creek, ON
8	67	Luka Stoikos	RB	Toronto	Toronto, ON

== Preseason ==
On February 6, 2025, it was announced that the Lions would host their preseason game in Langford, British Columbia at Starlight Stadium.

=== Schedule ===
Week	Game	Date	Kickoff	Opponent	Results		TV	Venue	Attendance	Summary
Week	Game	Date	Kickoff	Opponent	Score	Record	TV	Venue	Attendance	Summary
A	1	Mon, May 19	1:00 p.m. PDT	vs. Calgary Stampeders	L 16–26	0–1	CFL+	Starlight Stadium	N/A	Recap
B	Bye									
C	2	Fri, May 30	6:30 p.m. PDT	at Edmonton Elks	L 19–20	0–2	CFL+	Commonwealth Stadium	12,769	Recap

# Games played with blackout uniforms.

== Regular season ==
=== Standings ===
West Division
Team	GP	W	L	T	Pts	PF	PA	Div	Stk	
Saskatchewan Roughriders	18	12	6	0	24	472	409	5–5	L2	Details
BC Lions	18	11	7	0	22	559	499	6–4	W6	Details
Calgary Stampeders	18	11	7	0	22	488	416	7–3	W3	Details
Winnipeg Blue Bombers	18	10	8	0	20	459	424	4–6	W2	Details
Edmonton Elks	18	7	11	0	14	422	490	3–7	L2	Details

=== Schedule ===
Week	Game	Date	Kickoff	Opponent	Results		TV	Venue	Attendance	Summary
Week	Game	Date	Kickoff	Opponent	Score	Record	TV	Venue	Attendance	Summary
1	1	Sat, June 7	7:00 p.m. PDT	vs. Edmonton Elks	W 31–14	1–0	TSN/CBSSN	BC Place	52,837	Recap
2	2	Thu, June 12	5:30 p.m. PDT	at Winnipeg Blue Bombers	L 20–34	1–1	TSN/RDS/CBSSN	Princess Auto Stadium	32,343	Recap
3	3	Sat, June 21	4:00 p.m. PDT	vs. Winnipeg Blue Bombers	L 14–27	1–2	TSN/CTV/CBSSN	BC Place	20,138	Recap
4	4	Sat, June 28	4:00 p.m. PDT	at Saskatchewan Roughriders	L 18–37	1–3	TSN/CTV/CBSSN	Mosaic Stadium	27,804	Recap
5	5	Sat, July 5	4:00 p.m. PDT	at Montreal Alouettes	W 21–20	2–3	TSN/CTV/RDS/CBSSN	Molson Stadium	21,144	Recap
6	6	Sun, July 13	4:00 p.m. PDT	at Edmonton Elks	W 32–14	3–3	TSN	Commonwealth Stadium	17,559	Recap
7	7	Sat, July 19	4:00 p.m. PDT	vs. Saskatchewan Roughriders	L 27–33	3–4	TSN/CTV/CBSSN	BC Place	28,983	Recap
8	8	Sun, July 27	4:00 p.m. PDT	vs. Hamilton Tiger-Cats	L 33–37	3–5	TSN	BC Place	22,348	Recap
9	Bye									
10	9	Thu, Aug 7	4:30 p.m. PDT	at Hamilton Tiger-Cats	W 41–38 (OT)	4–5	TSN/RDS2/CBSSN	Tim Hortons Field	24,102	Recap
11	10	Sat, Aug 16	4:00 p.m. PDT	vs. Montreal Alouettes	W 36–18	5–5	TSN/RDS/CBSSN	BC Place	23,318	Recap
12	11	Sat, Aug 23	12:00 p.m. PDT	at Toronto Argonauts	L 34–52	5–6	TSN/CTV	BMO Field	18,354	Recap
13	Bye									
14	12	Fri, Sept 5	4:30 p.m. PDT	at Ottawa Redblacks	L 33–34	5–7	TSN/RDS2/CBSSN	TD Place Stadium	16,267	Recap
15	13	Fri, Sept 12	7:00 p.m. PDT	vs. Ottawa Redblacks	W 38–27	6–7	TSN/RDS/CBSSN	BC Place	19,803	Recap
16	14	Fri, Sept 19	6:30 p.m. PDT	at Calgary Stampeders	W 52–23	7–7	TSN	McMahon Stadium	23,554	Recap
17	15	Fri, Sept 26	7:00 p.m. PDT	vs. Toronto Argonauts	W 27–22	8–7	TSN	BC Place	21,205	Recap
18	16	Sat, Oct 4	4:00 p.m. PDT	vs. Calgary Stampeders	W 38–24	9–7	TSN	BC Place	28,308	Recap
19	Bye									
20	17	Fri, Oct 17	7:30 p.m. PDT	vs. Edmonton Elks	W 37–24	10–7	TSN	BC Place	26,308	Recap
21	18	Sat, Oct 25	4:00 p.m. PDT	at Saskatchewan Roughriders	W 27–21	11–7	TSN	Mosaic Stadium	25,416	Recap

# Games played with blackout uniforms.
# Games played with fog uniforms.
# Games played with gunmetal uniforms.

== Post-season ==
=== Schedule ===
Game	Date	Kickoff	Opponent	Results		TV	Venue	Attendance	Summary
Game	Date	Kickoff	Opponent	Score	Record	TV	Venue	Attendance	Summary
West Semi-Final	Sat, Nov 1	2:30 p.m. PDT	vs. Calgary Stampeders	W 33–30	1–0	TSN/RDS	BC Place	26,383	Recap
West Final	Sat, Nov 8	3:30 p.m. PST	at Saskatchewan Roughriders	L 21–24	1–1	TSN/RDS	Mosaic Stadium	33,350	Recap

# Games played with blackout uniforms.
# Games played with fog uniforms.

== Roster ==
2025 BC Lions final roster
**Quarterbacks**: 7 Chase Brice; 11 Jeremiah Masoli; 12 Nathan Rourke; **Running backs**: 36 Jacob Bond; 20 James Butler; 34 Zander Horvath; 45 Riley Pickett; **Receivers**: 83 Stanley Berryhill; 86 Jevon Cottoy; 19 Ayden Eberhardt; 4 Keon Hatcher; 77 Seven McGee; 18 Justin McInnis; 82 Kieran Poissant	**Offensive linemen**: 69 Jarell Broxton T; 51 Michael Couture C; 54 Andrew Peirson C/G; 57 Chris Schleuger T/G; 61 George Una G/C; 64 Kory Woodruff G/T; **Defensive linemen**: 96 Bradlee Anae DE; 98 Levi Bell DE; 90 Mathieu Betts DE; 91 Nathan Cherry DT; 40 Tibo Debaillie DT; 48 Hayden Harris DE; 14 Dewayne Hendrix DT; 99 Jonah Tavai DT	**Linebackers**: 25 Adam Auclair; 3 Micah Awe; 43 Terrence Ganyi; 44 Isaiah Guzylak-Messam; 46 Ben Hladik; 2 Josh Woods; **Defensive backs**: 28 Rob Carter; 33 Jackson Findlay; 27 Josh Hagerty; 21 Ronald Kent; 6 T. J. Lee; 1 Garry Peters; 24 Patrice Rene; 9 Deontai Williams	**Special teams**: 17 Carl Meyer P/K; 48 Kyle Nelson LS; 10 Sean Whyte K; **Practice roster**: 93 Anthony Bennett DE; 66 Alex Berwick G; 48 Ross Bolger K/P; 37 Marquise Bridges DB; 42 Jeremy Lewis LB; 1 Hergy Mayala WR; 53 Devin Richardson LB; 23 Cam Stone DB; 28 Jordan Terrell RB; 65 Tyran Walker-Hunt G; 0 Isaiah Winstead WR; 59 Brandon Yates G	**Injured list**: 50 Dejon Allen T; 35 Woodly Appolon LB; 29 Cristophe Beaulieu DB; 56 Christian Covington DT; 6 Tyler Coyle DB; 8 Jalon Edwards-Cooper DB; 68 David Foucault T; 13 Jermaine Jackson WR; 31 Adam Konar LB; 92 Tomasi Laulile DT; 95 Marcus Moore DT; 62 Tyler Packer G; 32 Maxime Rouyer LB; 0 Sione Teuhema DE; **Suspended**: Derwin Gray G; Demetrius Taylor DT
Italics indicate American player • **Bold** indicates Global player

== Coaching staff ==
BC Lions staff
Front Office and Support Staff: Owner – Amar Doman; President and CEO – Duane Vienneau; Senior Vice President, Business – George Chayka; Vice President, Football Operations – Neil McEvoy; General Manager – Ryan Rigmaiden; Assistant General Manager – Rob Ralph; Director of US Scouting – Jim Jauch; Manager, Football Operations – Tyler Gammon; U. S. Scout – Will Ark; Video Coordinator – Derek Oswalt; Head Athletic Therapist – Tristan Sandhu; Equipment Manager – Aaron Yeung	Head Coaches: Head Coach/Offensive Coordinator– Buck Pierce; Offensive Coaches: Receivers and Pass Game Coordinator – Kevin Bourgoin; Offensive Line – Paul Charbonneau; Running Backs – Kristian Matte; Defensive Coaches: Defensive Coordinator – Mike Benevides; Defensive Line – Randy Melvin; Linebackers – Glen Young; Secondary and Pass Game Coordinator – Ryan Phillips; Special Teams Coaches: Special Teams Coordinator – Cory McDiarmid; Special Teams Assistant – Derek Oswalt; → Coaching staff
