= Roark =

Roark may refer to:

- Roark Capital Group, a US-based private equity firm
- USS Roark (FF-1053), a United States Navy frigate
- Roark, Missouri

== People with the name ==
- Roark Bradford (1896–1948), American short story writer and novelist
- Roark Critchlow (born 1963), Canadian actor
- Roark Gourley (born 1949), American painter, sculptor, and mixed media artist
- Charles Thomas Irvine Roark, British polo player
- Raymond Jefferson Roark (1890–1966), Professor of Mechanics (University of Wisconsin), known for writing Roark's Formulas for Stress and Strain, later co-authored with Warren C. Young (1923–2012)
- William Marshall Roark (1938–1965), United States fighter pilot killed over North Vietnam
- Tanner Roark (born 1986), American baseball pitcher

=== Fictional ===
- Howard Roark, the protagonist of Ayn Rand's novel The Fountainhead
- Ted Roark, a character on the television series Chuck

== See also ==
- Roarke
- Rourke
- Rorke
