= Rourke =

Rourke is a surname of Irish origin. It is an Anglicized form of Ó Ruairc Notable people with the surname include:

- Allan Rourke (born 1980), Canadian professional ice hockey player
- Andy Rourke (1964–2023), English bass guitarist
- Colin P. Rourke (1943–2024), British mathematician
- Constance Rourke (1885–1941), American author and educator
- James Rourke (1838–1914), Canadian lumber manufacturer and politician from New Brunswick
- John Patrick Rourke (born 1942), South African botanist
- Josie Rourke (born 1976), British theatrical director
- Kurtis Rourke (born 2000), Canadian player of American football (brother of Nathan)
- Mickey Rourke (born 1952), American film actor
- Nathan Rourke (born 1998), Canadian professional football player (brother of Kurtis)
- Russell A. Rourke (1931–2003), American government administrator; Secretary of the Air Force 1985–86

== Fictional characters ==
- Dorothy Ann Rourke, one of the central characters of The Magic School Bus
- Jack Rourke, protagonist of the 2011 video game Need for Speed: The Run
- Lyle Tiberius Rourke, main antagonist of the 2001 Disney film, Atlantis: The Lost Empire, voiced by James Garner
- Paul Rourke, one of central characters of Richard Russo's 1997 novel Straight Man
- Quinn Rourke, playable character in upcoming Valve video game, Deadlock

== See also ==
- O'Rourke
- O'Rorke
- Roarke
- Rorke
