= Nathan Rourke =

Canadian gridiron football player (born 1998)

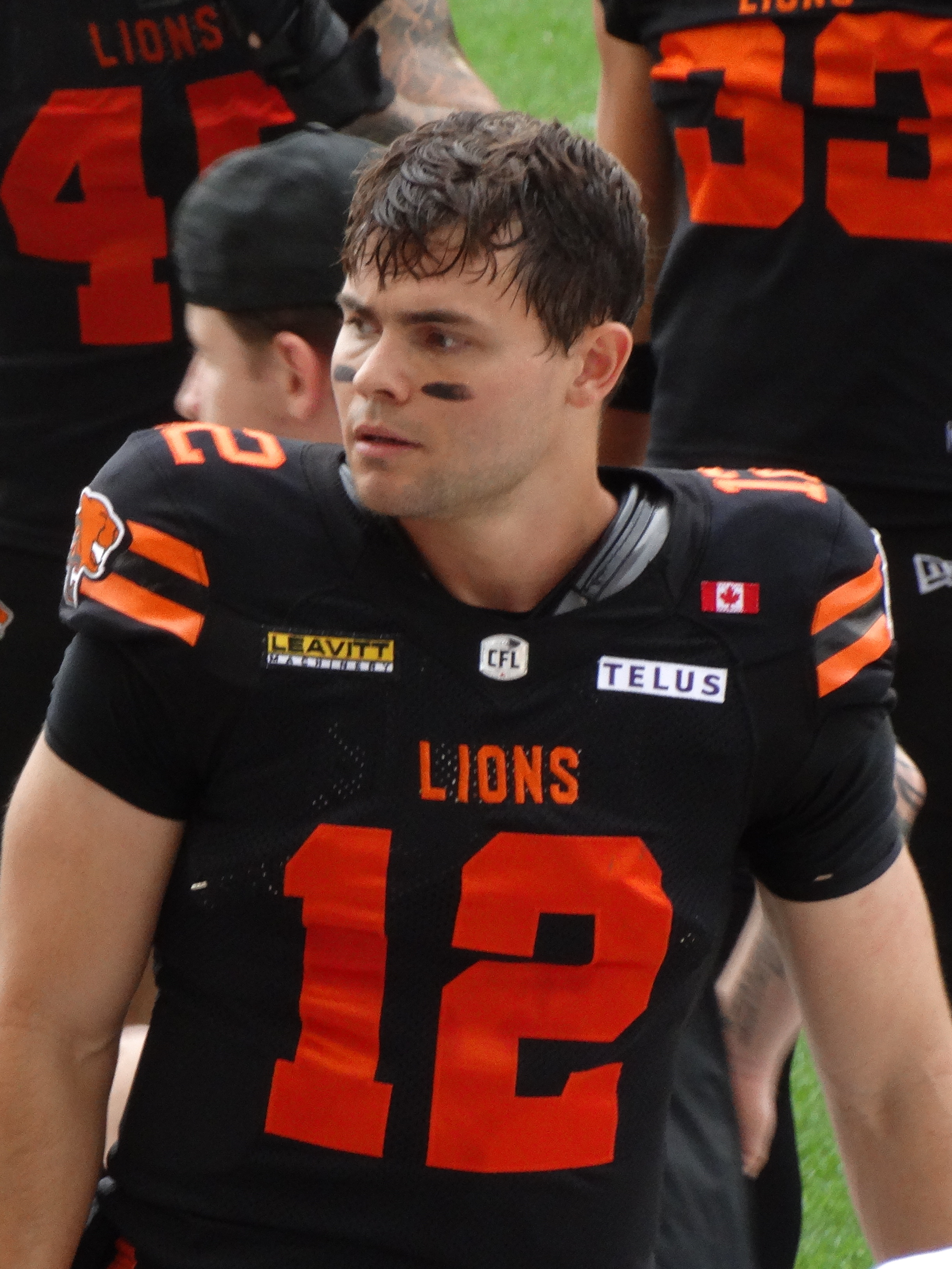
- Rourke with the BC Lions in 2025

No. 12 – BC Lions
- Position: Quarterback
- Roster status: Active
- CFL status: National

Personal information
- Born: May 24, 1998 (age 28); Victoria, British Columbia, Canada
- Listed height: 6 ft 1 in (1.85 m)
- Listed weight: 209 lb (95 kg)

Career information
- High school: Holy Trinity (Oakville, Ontario) Edgewood (Elmore, Alabama, U.S.)
- College: Fort Scott (2016); Ohio (2017–2019)
- NFL draft: 2020: undrafted
- CFL draft: 2020: 2nd round, 15th overall pick

Career history
- BC Lions (2021–2022); Jacksonville Jaguars (2023); New England Patriots (2023); New York Giants (2024)*; Atlanta Falcons (2024)*; BC Lions (2024–present)
- * Offseason or practice squad member only

Awards and highlights
- CFL Most Outstanding Player (2025); 2× CFL Most Outstanding Canadian (2022, 2025); 2× Dr. Beattie Martin Trophy (2022, 2025); Jeff Nicklin Memorial Trophy (2025); CFL All-Star (2025); 2× CFL West All-Star (2025, 2026); 2× Jon Cornish Trophy (2017, 2018); First-team All-MAC (2019); 2× Second-team All-MAC (2017, 2018)

Career CFL statistics as of 2026
- Passing completions: 1,108
- Passing attempts: 1,559
- Completion percentage: 71.1
- TD–INT: 87–51
- Passing yards: 15,788
- Stats at CFL.ca
- Stats at Pro Football Reference

Nathan Rourke (born May 24, 1998) is a Canadian professional football quarterback for the BC Lions of the Canadian Football League (CFL). He was named a CFL All-Star and the CFL's Most Outstanding Player in 2025 and is a two-time winner of the CFL's Most Outstanding Canadian Award. Nicknamed "Kid Canada," Rourke set the single-season CFL record for completion percentage (78.7%) during the 2022 CFL season. Rourke played college football for the Ohio Bobcats.

== Early life ==
Rourke was born in Victoria, British Columbia and grew up in Oakville, Ontario. He played minor football for the Burlington Stampeders before playing for three years at Holy Trinity Catholic Secondary School in Oakville. He transferred to Edgewood Academy in Elmore, Alabama, for his senior season of high school football. After his grade 12 season, he committed to play college football at Fort Scott Community College in Fort Scott, Kansas.

== College career ==
Rourke spent one season at Fort Scott, where he was named first-team All-KJCCC. He then transferred to Ohio University, where he started at quarterback for three years for the Bobcats. Rourke led Ohio to a 24–13 overall record as a starting quarterback for the Bobcats, while leading the team to three consecutive bowl victories in the 2017 Bahamas Bowl, 2018 Frisco Bowl, and the 2020 Famous Idaho Potato Bowl (January).

He was the first winner of the Jon Cornish Trophy as the top Canadian football player in the NCAA for 2017, and repeated as winner in 2018. Growing up, Rourke idolized Green Bay Packers quarterback Brett Favre.

== Professional career ==
Pre-draft measurables
Height	Weight	Arm length	Hand span	Wingspan
6 ft 1 1/4 in (1.86 m)	203 lb (92 kg)	30 5/8 in (0.78 m)	8 3/4 in (0.22 m)	6 ft 0 7/8 in (1.85 m)
All values from Pro Day

=== BC Lions (first stint) ===
Rourke was ranked as the seventh-overall prospect entering the 2020 CFL draft after being ranked third overall in both September 2019 and December 2019. He was eventually drafted in the second round with the 15th overall pick by the BC Lions. Rourke was the highest drafted Canadian quarterback since Jesse Palmer in the 2001 CFL draft. However, he did not play in 2020 due to the cancellation of the 2020 CFL season due to the COVID 19 pandemic. In May 2021, he tried out for the New York Giants at wide receiver.

==== 2021 ====
On May 19, 2021, Rourke signed a three-year contract with the Lions. Rourke started the opening game of the 2021 season against the Saskatchewan Roughriders since Michael Reilly could not play due to a shoulder/arm injury. Rourke completed 10 of 18 passes for 194 yards with two touchdowns and two interceptions. He was replaced in the second half by Reilly, but Rourke finished the game for the Lions. He spent most of the 2021 season as the backup for Reilly and being used in short yardage situations. Rourke also started the final game of the regular season on November 19, 2021, where he completed 23 out of 34 pass attempts for 359 yards, one touchdown, and two interceptions. He also had seven rush attempts for 34 yards with three touchdowns as he earned his first career win as a starter in the victory over the Edmonton Elks.

==== 2022 ====
Rourke made his 2022 CFL season debut as the starting quarterback for the BC Lions on June 10, 2022, where he went 26/29 for 282 yards and three passing touchdowns. He also had seven carries for 78 yards and two touchdowns leading his team to a 59–15 victory over the Edmonton Elks. On June 25, 2022, Rourke set the record for most passing yards by a Canadian quarterback in a CFL game with 436 against the Toronto Argonauts. He also set a Lions club record that night for pass completions in a single game with 39, breaking Buck Pierce's previous record of 38. On August 6, 2022, he broke his own record for passing yards by a Canadian when he threw for 477 yards against the Elks and also threw a career high five touchdown passes. In that same game, he completed 34 out of 37 pass attempts (91.9%) to record the highest pass completion rate in a single game with a minimum of 30 attempts and the third-highest completion percentage with a minimum of 20 attempts. In the following game, on August 14, 2022, Rourke again set a new mark for passing yards by a Canadian with 488 yards and tied his own Lions franchise record with 39 completions in the comeback victory over the Calgary Stampeders. Unfortunately, on August 19, 2022 Rourke left a game against the Saskatchewan Roughriders with a foot injury. A couple of days later it was determined that he suffered a Lisfranc sprain in his right foot and required surgery. At the time the Lions' organization was hopeful he would be able to return for the end of the regular season or playoffs. The 2022 season was a breakout campaign for Nathan Rourke as he was named a Top Performer of the Week in the CFL five times in the Lions' first nine games of the season. He was also named a CFL Top Performers of the Month for the months of June and August. Through the first half of the season Rourke was a leading candidate for the Most Outstanding Player and Most Outstanding Canadian awards. He was leading the league in passing attempts, completions, completion percentage, passing yards, yards per attempt, passing touchdowns, and quarterback rating. He was also second in the league with seven rushing touchdowns. Rourke returned to practice on October 11, 2022. It was announced that Rourke would return to the starting lineup for the team's final game of the regular season. He ended the season leading the league in passer efficiency, completion percentage and yards per game. His mark of 78.7% set a new CFL record for the highest completion percentage in a single season in league history. After besting the Stampeders in the first round of the playoffs Rourke and the Lions were defeated by the two-time defending champion Winnipeg Blue Bombers in the Western Final. In spite of missing close to half of the regular season, he won the CFL's award for Most Outstanding Canadian.

==== NFL workouts ====
Following his breakout season in the CFL, Rourke announced that he had scheduled workouts with a number of National Football League (NFL) teams. In December Rourke had workouts with seven NFL teams: the Las Vegas Raiders, Jacksonville Jaguars, Denver Broncos, Indianapolis Colts, Tampa Bay Buccaneers, Arizona Cardinals and Minnesota Vikings. In January 2023 Rourke had workouts with five more NFL teams: Cincinnati Bengals, Kansas City Chiefs, Los Angeles Chargers, New York Giants, and Cleveland Browns. As per CFL-NFL transfer window rules he was eligible to sign an NFL contract starting on January 9, 2023.

=== Jacksonville Jaguars ===
On January 16, 2023, it was officially announced that Rourke had signed a three-year contract with the Jaguars of the NFL. On January 30, he underwent foot surgery. Rourke was waived on August 29, and re-signed to the practice squad. On October 18, Rourke was signed to the Jaguars' active roster, then released three days later and re-signed to the practice squad. He was signed to the active roster again on December 9. Rourke was released without making an appearance on December 16.

=== New England Patriots ===
On December 18, 2023, Rourke was claimed off waivers by the New England Patriots. On May 6, 2024, Rourke was released by the Patriots.

=== New York Giants ===
On May 7, 2024, Rourke was claimed off waivers by the New York Giants. However, with three quarterbacks ahead of him on the depth chart, Rourke was waived on July 28.

=== Atlanta Falcons ===
On August 1, 2024, it was announced that Rourke had signed with the Atlanta Falcons. He played in the team's first preseason game on August 9, in the fourth quarter, where he completed three of 13 pass attempts, including three dropped passes, for 37 yards and had two carries for 24 rushing yards. He was released two days later on August 11.

=== BC Lions (second stint) ===
==== 2024 ====
On August 13, 2024, it was announced that Rourke had re-signed with the Lions to a three-year contract. With the incumbent starter, Vernon Adams, sidelined with a knee injury, Rourke was named the team's starter for their week 11 game against the Winnipeg Blue Bombers, just five days after his signing. With the Blue Bombers having smothered the Lions 25–0 two weeks earlier, they again showed dominance against the Lions, winning 20–11. Rourke completed eight of 25 pass attempts for 126 yards and two interceptions in his return to the Lions. The Lions lost their fourth game in a row in Rourke's second start as he completed 21 of 34 passes for 234 and one interception in the loss to the Ottawa Redblacks. The Victoria native next started in the first CFL regular season game played in Victoria where he had a 70% completion rate with 325 passing yards, three touchdown passes, one interception, and one rushing touchdown in a dominant 38–12 victory over the Redblacks. While Adams returned to practice in the following week, Rourke again started for the Lions, winning a second consecutive game and passing again for over 300 yards.

In the next game, against the Toronto Argonauts in week 15, Rourke struggled to move the Lions' offence, but finished the first half with a rushing touchdown as the Lions trailed 19–10. Nonetheless, Rourke was benched and Adams started the second half as the Lions lost 33–17. Following a bye week, Rourke remained as the team's starter as he completed 22 passes out of 36 attempts for 264 yards and six carries for 30 yards and two rushing touchdowns in the team's 32–29 overtime loss to the Hamilton Tiger-Cats. After a convincing victory over the Calgary Stampeders, he threw for 200 yards and two interceptions in the team's 39–8 loss to the Saskatchewan Roughriders. Rourke compiled a 3–5 record as a starter in 2024 before the Lions returned to Adams as the starter for the team's final regular season game and playoff loss to the Roughriders. Adams was traded to the Stampeders shortly after the season ended with Rourke as the undisputed starter for the 2025 season.

==== 2025 ====
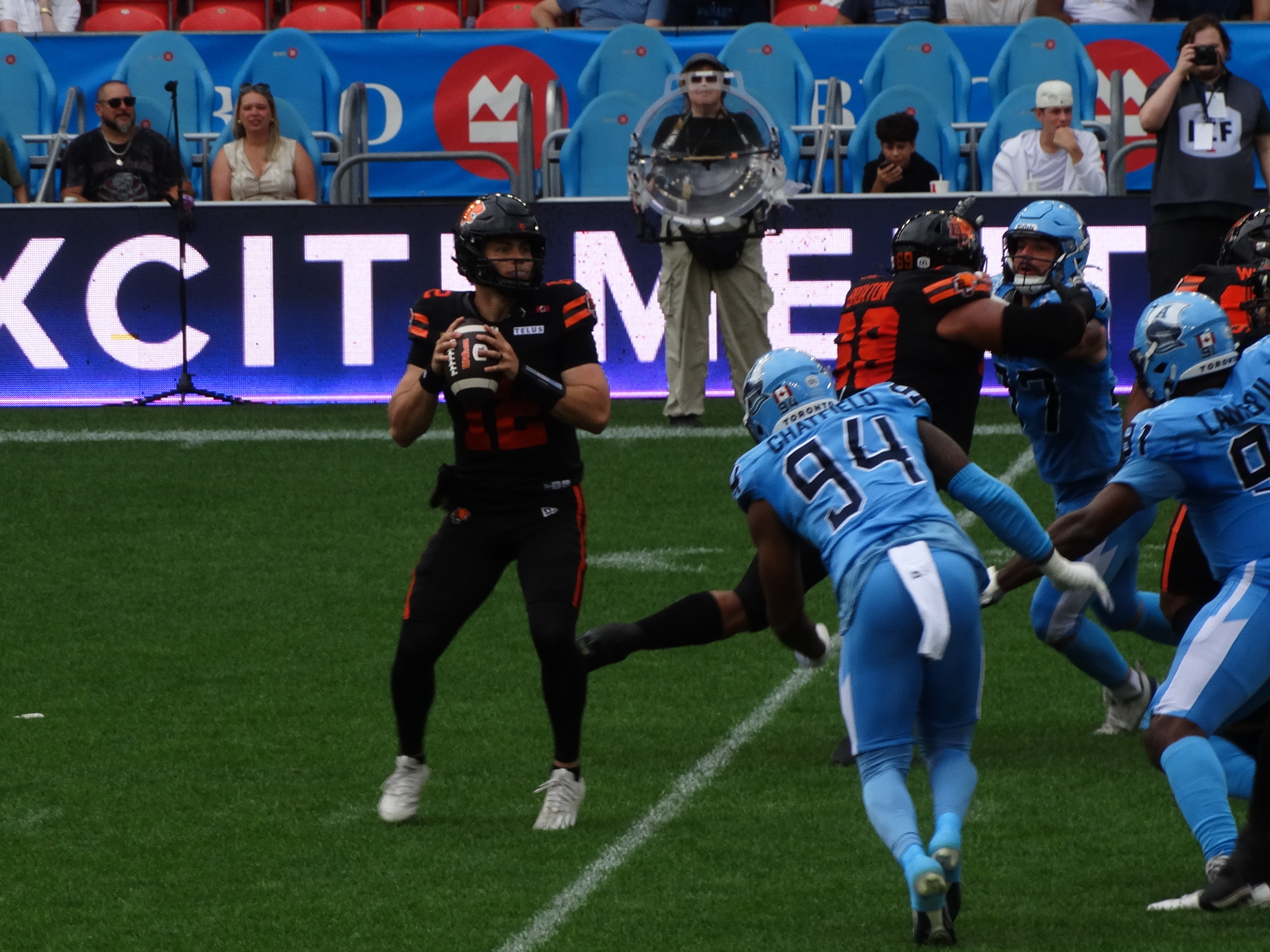
Rourke in 2025 against the Toronto Argonauts.

On January 31, 2025, to allow for better financial flexibility, the Lions announced that Rourke had re-structured his contract while remaining signed through the 2026 season. He opened the season with a 324-yard and three touchdown passing performance in the win against the Edmonton Elks. However, in the next game against the Winnipeg Blue Bombers, he completed just 12 of 27 pass attempts for 249 yards with one touchdown and one interception in the team's 34–20 loss. Rourke also suffered an oblique injury in the game and left midway through the fourth quarter. He did not play in the following two games due to the injury, both losses, and instead dressed as the third string quarterback behind Jeremiah Masoli and Chase Brice. Upon returning as the starter, Rourke had three straight games of over 300 yards passing. The Lions alternated paired wins and losses and the Lions had a 5–7 record after two thirds of a season.

On September 19, 2025, in a game against the Calgary Stampeders, Rourke set the single-season passing record by a Canadian player when he surpassed Russ Jackson's 3,641 yards thrown in 1969. After already having consistently impressive passing totals, Rourke began to score more on the ground as he had eight of his ten rushing touchdowns in the last third of the season while also leading the Lions to six straight wins to end the regular season. He established career highs with 352 completions from 500 pass attempts for 5,290 yards with 31 touchdowns and 16 interceptions. Despite missing two games due to injury, Rourke finished second in the league in passing yards and just six yards behind league-leader Bo Levi Mitchell while also finishing second in passing touchdowns. He also led all passers that had started at least one game with a passer rating of 112.2. He also had the third-highest passing yards in a single season in Lions history as well as the fifth-highest single season passing touchdowns in franchise history. He was named a CFL All-Star for the first time in his career while also winning both the CFL's Most Outstanding Canadian Award and the CFL's Most Outstanding Player Award.

The Lions finished in second place in the West Division and hosted the Calgary Stampeders in the West Semi-Final. In a close game, Rourke completed 16 of 22 pass attempts for 223 yards and six carries for 68 rushing yards and a touchdown. With the score tied 30–30 with 23 seconds remaining, he led the Lions on a three-play, 48-yard drive to set up Sean Whyte 43-yard game-winning field goal. In the West Final against the Saskatchewan Roughriders, Rourke completed 20 of 30 pass attempts for 290 yards with one touchdown pass and one interception, along with two rushing touchdowns in the team's 24–21 loss.

With one year remaining on his contract, it was announced on January 27, 2026, that Rourke had signed a contract extension with the Lions through the 2028 season.

==== 2026 ====
On July 17, 2026, Rourke left the Lions' week 7 game against the Edmonton Elks after suffering an injury to his left (non-throwing) shoulder, early in the match and was expected to be out for "weeks rather than months", per Lion's general manager Ryan Rigmaiden. On July 24, 2026, Rourke was placed on the Lions' reserve roster. He rejoined the active roster on August 7, 2026. Rourke finished the 2026 regular season with two Player of the week honours in weeks 12, and 17. In addition to his weekly honours, Rourke was also named September's Player of the Month.

Rourke also took home 2 team awards, as the Lions representative for Most Outstanding Player, and Most Outstanding Canadian. On October 27, Rourke was announced as a finalist for CFL's Most Outstanding Canadian, going up against Tyson Philpot and Brady Oliveira.

Rourke was named to the West Division All-CFL team, despite Edmonton Elks quarterback Cody Fajardo being announced as an MOP finalist ahead of Rourke a day prior. This is the second consecutive year that Rourke received this honour.

== Flag football career ==
Rourke hopes to play flag football at the 2028 Summer Olympics for Canada. In preparation, he joined the VanCity Vice of the British Columbia Adult Flag Football League in March 2026.

== Career statistics ==
=== CFL ===
Year	Team	Games			Passing							Rushing				
Year	Team	GD	GS	Record	Att	Comp	Pct	Yards	TD	Int	QBR	Att	Yards	Avg	Long	TD
2021	BC	13	2	1–1	82	52	63.4	754	3	5	80.0	18	111	6.2	17	5
2022	BC	10	10	8–2	324	255	78.7	3,349	25	10	123.6	39	304	7.8	50	7
2024	BC	9	8	3–5	209	136	65.1	1,781	4	9	80.3	24	213	8.9	51	5
2025	BC	18	16	11–5	500	352	70.4	5,290	31	16	112.2	61	564	9.3	70	10
2026	BC	16	15	9–6	444	313	70.5	4,614	24	11	111.8	31	356	11.5	29	3
Career		65	51	32–19	1,559	1,108	71.1	15,788	87	51	108.5	173	1,548	8.9	70	30

==== Postseason ====
CFL playoffs				Passing					Rushing		
Year	Game	GP	GS	Att	Cmp	Yards	TD	Int	Att	Yards	TD
2022	West Semi-Final	1	1	30	22	321	2	0	1	5	0
2022	West Final	1	1	37	20	300	1	2	2	20	0
2024	West Semi-Final	1	0	0	-	-	-	-	0	-	-
2025	West Semi-Final	1	1	22	16	223	0	0	6	68	1
2025	West Final	1	1	30	20	290	1	1	4	6	2
2026	West Semi-Final	1	1	32	21	366	3	0	2	30	0
2026	West Final	1	1	39	23	328	0	0	5	32	1
CFL totals		7	6	190	122	1,828	7	3	20	161	4

=== College ===
Year	Team	Games			Passing								Rushing			
Year	Team	GP	GS	Record	Cmp	Att	Pct	Yds	Y/A	TD	Int	Rtg	Att	Yds	Avg	TD
2016	Fort Scott CC	11	11	4–7	221	378	58.5	2,367	6.3	18	13	119.9	118	27	0.2	3
2017	Ohio	13	11	8–3	161	292	55.1	2,203	7.5	17	7	132.9	137	912	6.7	21
2018	Ohio	13	13	9–4	165	275	60.0	2,431	8.8	23	8	156.0	134	860	6.4	15
2019	Ohio	13	13	7–6	200	328	61.0	2,820	8.6	20	5	150.3	154	867	5.6	13
FBS career		39	37	24–13	526	895	58.8	7,454	8.3	60	20	146.4	425	2,639	6.2	49

== Personal life ==
Rourke was born to Larry and Robyn Rourke. His younger brother, Kurtis Rourke, played quarterback at Ohio for four years before finishing his U.S. college career at Indiana University, where he received the Cornish Trophy in 2024.
