= Jerry Bradley =

Jerry Bradley may refer to:

- Jerry Bradley (poet) (born 1948), American poet and professor
- Jerry Bradley (music executive) (1940–2023), American music executive and producer
- Jerry Bradley (Canadian football) (born 1945), American-born Canadian football player
