= Roarke =

Roarke is a surname or given name and may refer to:

== People ==
- Roarke Smith: a professional Australian rules footballer
- Adam Roarke: American actor and film director
- Mike Roarke: retired American catcher and coach in Major League Baseball

== Fictional characters ==
=== Literature ===
- Roarke (In Death): a fictional character from J. D. Robb's series in Death
- Patrick Roarke: a fictional character from J. D. Robb's series in Death

=== Television ===
- Mr. Roarke: a fictional character from the American television series Fantasy Island
- Henry Roarke: a fictional character from the American television series Quantico
- Brendan Roarke: a fictional character from the American television series Sons of Anarchy

=== Film ===
- Roarke Hartman: a fictional character from the American film The River Wild
- Roarke: a fictional character from the American film Ghost Rider: Spirit of Vengeance

== See also ==
- Roark (disambiguation)
- Rourke, surname
