= Ryan Phillips =

American gridiron football player and coach (born 1982)

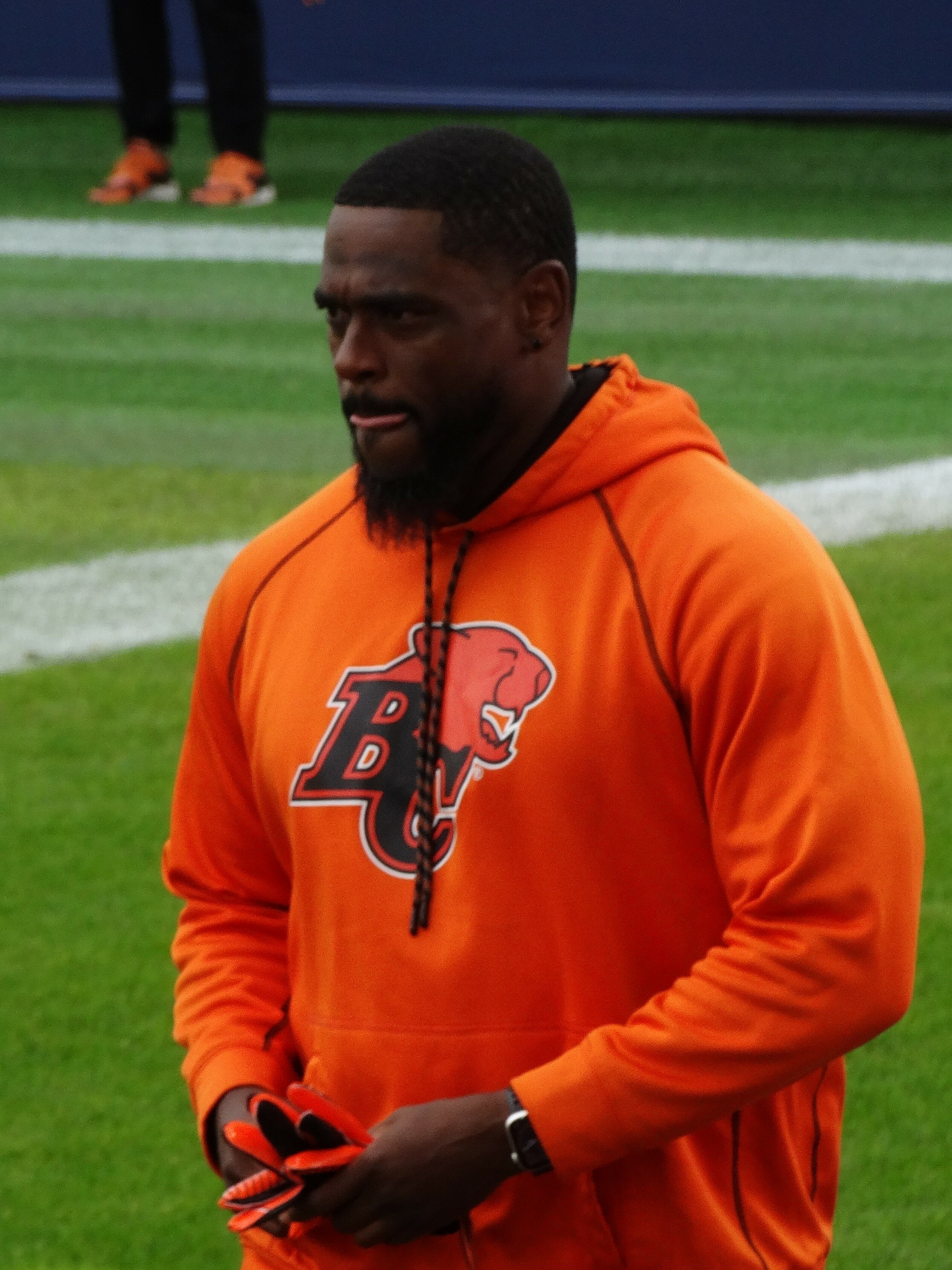
- Phillips with the BC Lions in 2022

BC Lions
- Title: Pass game coordinator Secondary coach

Personal information
- Born: November 15, 1982 (age 43); Seattle, Washington, U.S.
- Listed height: 5 ft 10 in (1.78 m)
- Listed weight: 195 lb (88 kg)

Career information
- High school: Franklin
- College: Eastern Washington

Career history

Playing
- BC Lions (2005–2016); Montreal Alouettes (2017)

Coaching
- BC Lions (2019–2024) Defensive backs coach; BC Lions (2022–2024) Defensive coordinator; BC Lions (2025–present) Secondary coach; BC Lions (2025–present) Pass game coordinator

Awards and highlights
- 2× Grey Cup champion (2006, 2011); 4× CFL All-Star (2007, 2010, 2012, 2013); 5× CFL West All-Star (2007, 2010, 2012, 2013, 2015); BC Lions records: Most interception return yards, career (816); Most interception return yards (299), season (2007); Most interceptions (12), season (2007); Most defensive touchdowns, career (6); Most interception return touchdowns, career (5)

Ryan Phillips (born November 15, 1982) is the secondary coach and pass game coordinator for the BC Lions of the Canadian Football League (CFL) and a former professional Canadian football defensive back. He played most of his career with the BC Lions, where he has been part of two Grey Cup championship teams (94th Grey Cup and 99th Grey Cup) and was the last remaining active Lions player from the 2006 roster that won the 2006 Grey Cup. He holds numerous Lions franchise records and had been named a western all-star five times and a league all-star four times. Phillips was known for his durability, having only missed four games in his 12-year career which includes a consecutive games-played streak of 181 games. He was also a member of the Montreal Alouettes in 2017. He is a 2006 graduate of Eastern Washington University which is also where he played college football for the Eastern Washington Eagles.

== College career ==
Phillips played high school football at Franklin High in his home town of Seattle. Following graduation in 2000, Phillips played junior college football at Mt. San Antonio College in Walnut, California.

Phillips played college football as a defensive back, running back, and kick returner at Eastern Washington University. As a senior, Phillips was named to the first-team All-Big Sky Conference as a cornerback and kick returner. Phillips had 5 interceptions, 16 kick returns for 330 yards (a 20.6 yard average) during his senior year for the Eagles, and in 2003, rushed for 85 yards on 11 carries (a 7.7 yard average), with 3 receptions for 17 yards.

== Professional career ==
Pre-draft measurables
Height	Weight	40-yard dash	20-yard shuttle	Three-cone drill	Vertical jump	Broad jump	Bench press
5 ft 9 5/8 in (1.77 m)	191 lb (87 kg)	4.58 s	4.62 s	7.60 s	36.0 in (0.91 m)	10 ft 1 in (3.07 m)	11 reps
All values from Pro Day

=== BC Lions ===
Following a free agent camp in Portland, Oregon, Phillips joined the BC Lions for the 2005 season. He started all 18 games during his rookie season where he recorded 56 tackles, good for third on the team, as well as three interceptions.

In 2006, Phillips moved from his defensive halfback position to the defense's nickel back for all 18 regular season games. Phillips recorded 23 defensive tackles, five special teams tackles, two interceptions (one for a 23-yard touchdown), two fumble recoveries and 3 pass knockdowns. Phillips added the Lions sole interception in the Western Division Championship game against the Saskatchewan Roughriders and chipped in three tackles in the Lions' 2006 Grey Cup victory over the Montreal Alouettes.

In 2007, Phillips led the CFL with 12 interceptions, tying a team record held by former Lions' defensive back, Larry Crawford, in the process. He also set a franchise record for most interception return yards in a season with 299 yards. The previous record had been 188. He also recorded the most tackles in his career with 65 made that year. After the season, Phillips was named a CFL All-Star for the first time in his career.

2008 was a stark contrast to the previous year as Phillips recorded only one interception in 18 games. The following year, he bounced back with four interceptions while recording the first fumble-return touchdown of his career, in addition to his third career interception return touchdown. In 2010 he recorded his highest sack tally to date with four for the year, to accompany another five interceptions with 49 tackles. Subsequently, he earned his second CFL All-Star selection that year.

Phillips was part of the 2011 BC Lions team that began the year with five consecutive losses and finished to win the 99th Grey Cup in Vancouver, which had never been done before in CFL history. During the season, he recorded 46 defensive tackles with four interceptions and one interception return touchdown. He had two tackles in the Western Final that year and one in the Grey Cup game itself as he won his second Grey Cup championship.

For the 2012 and 2013 seasons, Phillips earned All-Star selections in both years while fostering his reputation as an excellent coverage defensive back. He recorded four interceptions with 32 defensive tackles in 2012 and two interceptions with 36 defensive tackles in 2013. In 2014, he added another three interceptions to his tally while registering 36 defensive tackles.

For the 2015 season, Phillips led the league with six interceptions and made 26 defensive tackles in just 14 games. For the first time in his professional career, he did not play in a game, ending his consecutive games-played streak at 181 games. Despite playing in only 14 games, Phillips was named to the 2015 CFL Western All-Star team for the fifth time in his career. He scored his fifth career interception return touchdown in a game against the Montreal Alouettes on August 20, 2015, which tied for the franchise record for interception return touchdowns. He also set the franchise record for defensive touchdowns with six total, including his fumble return touchdown in 2008. He finished the season tied for the franchise record for most interception return yards with Larry Crawford who also had 790 yards.

In 2016, Phillips set the franchise record for most interception return yards in a career after his 26-yard return against the Hamilton Tiger-Cats, on July 1, 2016, brought him to 816 yards total. He played in his 200th career game on August 4, 2016, against the Alouettes, which is the sixth-most games played in BC Lions' history. Phillips was signed through the 2017 CFL season with the Lions after he signed a contract extension on January 24, 2016. Nevertheless, at age 34, he was released by the Lions on February 10, 2017, just prior to the opening of the free agency period.

=== Montreal Alouettes ===
Shortly after his release from BC, Phillips signed with the Montreal Alouettes on February 15, 2017. He dressed in two games for the Alouettes, recording eight tackles, but was released on July 16, 2017.

== Coaching career ==
Following his playing career Ryan Phillips joined the BC Lions as a defensive backs coach. He remained in this role for two seasons. On December 15, 2021, the Lions announced they had re-signed Phillips to a contract extension for the 2022 CFL season, and had promoted him to defensive coordinator, where he served in that capacity for three seasons. Following a head coach change for the 2025 season, he was named the team's secondary coach and pass game coordinator while Mike Benevides took over as defensive coordinator.

== Personal life ==
In addition to being a professional football player, Phillips is a high school teacher in the Seattle school system during the off-season. He has two sons, Ryan Jr. and Braylen.
