= Sammy Greene =

American football player (born 1959)

No. 35, 5, 11, 83
- Position: Wide receiver

Personal information
- Born: January 28, 1959 (age 67)
- Listed height: 6 ft 1 in (1.85 m)
- Listed weight: 190 lb (86 kg)

Career information
- High school: Santa Barbara (Santa Barbara, California)
- College: UNLV
- NFL draft: 1981: 4th round, 84th overall pick

Career history
- Miami Dolphins (1981)*; Toronto Argonauts (1982)*; Montreal Concordes (1982)*; Arizona Wranglers (1983)*; Denver Gold (1983); BC Lions (1983); Saskatchewan Roughriders (1984); Calgary Stampeders (1984); Orlando Renegades (1985)*; San Antonio Gunslingers (1985); BC Lions (1988)*
- * Offseason or practice squad member only

Samuel Dale Greene (born January 28, 1959) is an American former professional football wide receiver who played in the Canadian Football League (CFL) with the BC Lions, Saskatchewan Roughriders, and Calgary Stampeders. He played college football at UNLV, and was selected by the Miami Dolphins in the fourth round of the 1981 NFL draft.

== Early life ==
Samuel Dale Greene was born on January 28, 1959. He played high school football and ran track at Santa Barbara High School in Santa Barbara, California.

== College career ==
Greene played college football at the University of Nevada, Las Vegas, where he was a three-year letterman for the UNLV Rebels from 1978 to 1980. He caught seven passes for 105 yards and one touchdown in 1978, 40 passes for 821 yards and nine touchdowns in 1979, and 43 passes for 859 yards and 11 touchdowns in 1980. His 11 receiving touchdowns in 1980 were the most among independents that year and also set a single-season school record. As a junior in 1979, Greene started waving a towel around the end zone after scoring touchdowns, acquiring the nickname "Disco Kid". Midway through the 1980 season, it was reported that officials would not let him wave the towel anymore due to concerns of taunting. He was ejected from a game after elbowing an opposing defensive back.

== Professional career ==
Greene was selected by the Miami Dolphins in the fourth round, with the 84th overall pick, of the 1981 NFL draft. He was cut by the Dolphins on August 24, 1981. He had a workout with the Green Bay Packers on September 17, 1981, but was not signed.

Greene signed with the Toronto Argonauts of the Canadian Football League (CFL) for the 1982 CFL season. On June 18, he was traded to the Montreal Concordes for future considerations. He was cut by Montreal on June 25, 1982, before the team's final preseason game.

In November 1982, Greene signed with the Arizona Wranglers of the United States Football League (USFL) for the 1983 USFL season. He was waived on February 25, 1983, before the start of the season. He then signed with the USFL's Denver Gold and played in two games (without recording any statistics) before being hurt.

On May 19, 1983, Greene signed with the BC Lions of the CFL, reuniting with his former receiver coach at UNLV, Adam Rita. Rita was also the person who recruited Greene out of high school. Greene dressed in 14 games for the Lions in 1983, recording 75 receptions for 755 yards and five touchdowns, nine rushing attempts for 64 yards and one touchdown, and 27 kickoff returns for 749 yards and one touchdown. His 75 catches were a single-season franchise record. He also set a franchise record with an 113-yard kick return. He was released by BC on October 27, 1983. Greene claimed that the release was due to a contract dispute but general manager Bob Ackles said it was not contract related. Greene apparently had wanted an advance payment-in-full on his contract bonuses. The Toronto Star reported the release was due to "team unity". Lions head coach Don Matthews was not impressed with Greene's work habits or his reluctance to play in cold weather.

Green then signed with the CFL's Saskatchewan Roughriders on November 8, 1983. He dressed in five games for the Roughriders in 1984, catching 20 passes for 301 yards and three touchdowns while also returning eight kickoffs for 197 yards. He was released on August 22, 1984, after the team obtained Canadian receiver Mike Collymore. After his release, Greene stated "I don't mind, because as far as I'm concerned, if they dropped an atomic bomb on Regina, there'd only be 67 cents damage."

Greens signed a 21-day trial with the Calgary Stampeders of the CFL on August 19, 1984. He dressed in three games for Calgary, totaling seven receptions for 58 yards and five kickoff returns for 127 yards. Greene was released on September 27, and replaced on the roster by Michael Harper.

Greene signed with the Orlando Renegades for the 1985 USFL season. He was released on January 18, 1985. He was briefly a member of the USFL's San Antonio Gunslingers in 1985 but did not play in any games.

In April 1985, Greene claimed he was being blackballed out of the CFL. In 1988, he returned to the Lions after coach Don Matthews was fired. Greene was released by BC on July 7, 1988, before the start of the regular season.

== See also ==
- BC Lions all-time records and statistics
