= Rork (disambiguation) =

Rork is a series of graphic novels by the German comic author Andreas.

Rork may also refer to:

- Sam E. Rork (1870–1933), American film producer
- Ann Rork Light (1908–1988), American actress and philanthropist
- RORK, ICAO airport code for the Kitadaito Airport in Japan

== See also ==
- Rorke, a surname
