= Zander Horvath =

American gridiron football player (born 1999)

- Horvath with the BC Lions in 2026

No. 34 – BC Lions
- Positions: Fullback, running back
- Roster status: Active
- CFL status: American

Personal information
- Born: December 10, 1998 (age 27); Mishawaka, Indiana, U.S.
- Listed height: 6 ft 3 in (1.91 m)
- Listed weight: 230 lb (104 kg)

Career information
- High school: Marian (Mishawaka)
- College: Purdue (2017–2021)
- NFL draft: 2022: 7th round, 260th overall pick

Career history
- Los Angeles Chargers (2022); Pittsburgh Steelers (2023)*; Los Angeles Chargers (2023)*; New Orleans Saints (2024)*; Miami Dolphins (2024)*; BC Lions (2025–present)
- * Offseason or practice squad member only

Awards and highlights
- Third-team All-Big Ten (2020)

Career NFL statistics
- Games played: 15
- Rushing attempts: 4
- Rushing yards: 8
- Receptions: 5
- Receiving yards: 8
- Receiving touchdowns: 2
- Stats at Pro Football Reference

Career CFL statistics as of 2026
- Games played: 28
- Rushing yards: 1,125
- Rushing touchdowns: 20
- Receptions: 29
- Receiving yards: 321
- Receiving touchdowns: 3

Alexander "Zander" John Horvath (born December 10, 1998) is an American professional football fullback and running back for the BC Lions of the Canadian Football League (CFL). He played college football at Purdue, and was selected by the Los Angeles Chargers in the seventh round of the 2022 NFL draft.

== Early life ==
Zander went to Saint Bavo for elementary and middle school, where he played football and graduated from in 2013. Horvath then also played football at Marian High School in Mishawaka, Indiana. He recorded 3,373 yards and 50 touchdowns on the ground, earning all-state and USA Today Midwest Regional All-American honors.

== College career ==
Horvath initially committed to Indiana to play linebacker as a preferred walk-on, but switched commitments when Purdue running backs coach Chris Barclay offered him a chance to play his natural position of running back.

Horvath did not play in 2017.

In 2018, Horvath appeared in 13 games, rushing nine times for 42 yards and a touchdown. Horvath also caught four passes for 38 yards.

In 2019, Horvath's role expanded. Horvath appeared in 11 games, starting four. He rushed 79 times for 377 yards and two touchdowns, and caught 17 passes for 142 yards and a touchdown.

In the pandemic-shortened 2020 season, Horvath appeared in 6 games, starting five. He rushed 89 times for 442 yards and two touchdowns, and caught 30 passes for 304 yards.

In his senior year of 2021, Horvath rushed 91 times for 320 yards, and caught 17 passes for 108 yards.

== Professional career ==
=== Pre-draft ===
Pre-draft measurables
Height	Weight	Arm length	Hand span	Wingspan	40-yard dash	10-yard split	20-yard split	20-yard shuttle	Three-cone drill	Vertical jump	Broad jump	Bench press
6 ft 1 3/4 in (1.87 m)	232 lb (105 kg)	32 in (0.81 m)	9 in (0.23 m)	6 ft 4 1/4 in (1.94 m)	4.61 s	1.57 s	2.58 s	4.25 s	6.75 s	35.5 in (0.90 m)	10 ft 3 in (3.12 m)	31 reps
All values from Pro Day

Initially not projected to be a drafted player, Horvath intrigued scouts with his elite positional athleticism for a fullback, scoring a 9.83 out of 10 Raw Athletic Score (RAS).

=== Los Angeles Chargers (first stint) ===
Horvath was selected by the Los Angeles Chargers in the seventh round (260th overall) of the 2022 NFL draft. Horvath made his NFL debut in Week 1 of the 2024 season against the Las Vegas Raiders. On his first NFL carry, he converted a third-and-one for a first down. In the second quarter, he caught a one-yard touchdown pass from quarterback Justin Herbert in the 24–19 victory. The following week against the Kansas City Chiefs, Horvath caught another one-yard touchdown pass from Herbert in the loss, becoming the first running back or fullback to record a touchdown reception in each of his first two games since 1942. He also became the fourth seventh-round draft choice to record two touchdown receptions within his first two career games. In Week 6, he made his first NFL start in an overtime victory over the Denver Broncos. Horvath appeared in 15 games with two starts before being inactive for the final two games of the regular season due to an ankle injury. He finished the season with five receptions for eight yards and two touchdowns while rushing for eight yards on four carries. He appeared in the Chargers' Wild Card playoff game against the Jacksonville Jaguars, recording two total tackles in the loss. He was released by the Chargers on August 30, 2023.

=== Pittsburgh Steelers ===
On September 2, 2023, Horvath signed to the practice squad of the Pittsburgh Steelers. He was released on October 9.

=== Los Angeles Chargers (second stint) ===
Horvath was re-signed to the Los Angeles Chargers' practice squad on November 22, 2023. He was released by Los Angeles on December 1.

=== New Orleans Saints ===
On March 7, 2024, Horvath signed with the New Orleans Saints. On August 13, he was waived by the Saints.

=== Miami Dolphins ===
On August 19, 2024, Horvath signed with the Miami Dolphins. He was waived by the Dolphins on August 27.

=== BC Lions ===
On January 24, 2025, Horvath signed with the BC Lions of the Canadian Football League (CFL) as a running back. He dressed for the team's first four games but did not record any statistics. In a Week 5 victory over the Montreal Alouettes, Horvath recorded his first CFL carry before suffering an injury during the contest. He was placed on the Lions' one-game injured list on July 13 and subsequently missed the team's next eight games. On August 12, Horvath was reassigned to the Lions' practice roster. On September 18, he was recalled to the active roster following an injury to fellow running back James Butler. In Week 16 against the Calgary Stampeders, Horvath made his first start of the season and returned to action for the first time since his injury, recording 12 carries for 152 yards and a 70-yard touchdown in a 52–23 victory, earning CFL Running Back of the Week honors. On the season, he dressed in 10 games with one start, recording 24 rushing attempts for 231 yards and two touchdowns while adding two receptions for 47 yards. The Lions finished the season with an 11–7 record and qualified for the playoffs. Horvath appeared in both playoff games, recording three rushing attempts for 10 yards.

In Week 9 of the 2026 season, Horvath earned his first start of the season against the Winnipeg Blue Bombers. He rushed for a CFL season-high 191 yards on 17 carries and scored three rushing touchdowns in the 35–19 victory, on a one-yard quarterback sneak and runs of 58 and 35 yards. Horvath combined with quarterback Kaidon Salter for 351 rushing yards.

Zander finished the 2026 season with 18 rushing touchdowns, and 3 receiving touchdowns. This put Horvath tied for second in single season rushing touchdowns, and tied for 3rd in most touchdowns in a single season.

== Career statistics ==
Legend
	Led the league
**Bold**	League career high

=== NFL ===
Year	Team	Games		Rushing				Receiving			
Year	Team	GP	GS	Att	Yds	Avg	TD	Rec	Yds	Avg	TD
2022	LAC	15	2	4	8	2.0	0	5	8	1.6	2
Career		15	2	4	8	2.0	0	5	8	1.6	2

=== CFL ===
Year	Team	Games (Note: Horvath is not officially credited with a start against Hamilton on August 8, 2026; game log and film show he started.)		Rushing				Receiving			
Year	Team	GD	GS	Att	Yds	Avg	TD	Rec	Yds	Avg	TD
2025	BC	10	1	24	231	**9.6**	2	2	47	**23.5**	0
2026	BC	**18**	**11**	**183**	**894**	4.9	**18**	**27**	**274**	10.1	**3**
Career		28	12	207	1,125	5.5	20	29	321	11.1	3

=== College ===
Year	Team	Games		Rushing				Receiving			
Year	Team	GP	GS	Att	Yds	Avg	TD	Rec	Yds	Avg	TD
2017	Purdue	0	0	Redshirted (redshirt)							
2018	Purdue	13	0	9	42	4.7	1	4	38	9.5	0
2019	Purdue	11	4	79	377	4.8	2	17	142	8.4	1
2020	Purdue	6	5	89	442	5.0	2	30	304	10.1	0
2021	Purdue	8	5	91	320	3.5	3	17	108	6.4	0
Career		38	14	268	1,181	4.4	8	68	592	8.7	1
