= Neal Beaumont =

Canadian football player

No. 27
- Positions: Defensive back, punter

Personal information
- Born: 1941 (age 84–85); Vancouver, British Columbia, Canada
- Listed height: 6 ft 1 in (1.85 m)
- Listed weight: 225 lb (102 kg)

Career information
- College: UBC- Vancouver Meralomas (Jr.) Nickname CRUSHER

Career history
- 1960–1967: BC Lions

Awards and highlights
- Grey Cup champion (1964); CFL West All-Star (1964); 1959- Meraloma All-Star HB, Led league in scoring.; 1960 -Western CFL Rookie of the year Dr. Beattie Martin Trophy; 1963 B.C.Lions Most Valuable Canadian; 1985 Selected to B.C. Lions All Time Team.; 1986 Inducted B.C. Sports Hall of Fame (1964 Team); 1993 Selected to B.C. Lions Dream Team; 2000 Honoured as Hero of the Past B.C. Lions; 2003 Inducted into B.C. Lions Wall of Fame; 2011 B.C. Football Hall of Fame; CFL record 120 yard interception return 1963- Guinness Book of World Records 1979

Neal Beaumont (born 1941) is a former award-winning and Grey Cup champion defensive back and punter who played in the Canadian Football League for the BC Lions from 1960 to 1967.

A native of Vancouver, Beaumont earned a starting defensive halfback position with the Lions when he was 19 in 1960 and, along with 53 punt returns for 226 yards, was the winner of the Dr. Beattie Martin Trophy for Canadian rookie of the year in the west. This was the first time a BC Lion had won an individual CFL player award. He would go on to play 8 seasons, intercepting 22 passes and becoming the team's leading punter(both punts and yards,) He punted 624 times for 25,607 yards. He also has the longest interception return in CFL history, 120 yards for a touchdown, against the Saskatchewan Roughriders on October 12, 1963.

His best season was 1964, when he intercepted 5 passes, was a Western All-Star Defensive Halfback, had the best punting average in the Western Conference, 42.1 on 90 punts, led the team in kickoff returns with 19 and also returned 51 punts and added a final interception in the Lions first ever Grey Cup victory. "The nickname CRUSHER derives from Beaumont's cannibalistic tackling tendencies, which we try not to discourage" - In total he played 123 regular season games for the Lions. He was elected to the BC Lions Wall of Fame in 2003.
