= Roark's Formulas for Stress and Strain =

1938 mechanical engineering design book by Richard G. Budynas and Ali M. Sadegh

- 4th edition (1965)
- Author: Raymond J. Roark, Warren C. Young, Richard G. Budynas, Ali M. Sadegh
- Language: English
- Subject: Engineering
- Publisher: McGraw-Hill Companies, The
- Publication date: 1938
- Media type: Hardback
- Pages: 928
- ISBN: 9781260453751

Roark's Formulas for Stress and Strain is a mechanical engineering design book written by Raymond Roark, Later co-written with Warren C. Young, and now maintained by Richard G. Budynas and Ali M. Sadegh. It was first published in 1938 and the most current ninth edition was published in March 2020.

== Subjects ==
The book covers various subjects, including bearing and shear stress, experimental stress analysis, stress concentrations, material behavior, and stress and strain measurement. It also features expanded tables and cases, improved notations and figures within the tables, consistent table and equation numbering, and verification of correction factors. The formulas are organized into tables in a hierarchical format: chapter, table, case, subcase, and each case and subcase is accompanied by diagrams.

The main topics of the book include:

• The behavior of bodies under stress

• Analytical, numerical, and experimental methods

• Tension, compression, shear, and combined stress

• Beams and curved beams

• Torsion, flat plates, and columns

• Shells of revolution, pressure vessels, and pipes

• Bodies under direct pressure and shear stress

• Elastic stability

• Dynamic and temperature stresses

• Stress concentration

• Fatigue and fracture

• Stresses in fasteners and joints

• Composite materials and solid biomechanics

== Topics ==
The topics covered in the 7th Edition:

Chapter 1 – Introduction
Chapter 2 – Stress and Strain: Important Relationships
Chapter 3 – The Behavior of Bodies Under Stress
Chapter 4 – Principles and Analytical Methods
Chapter 5 – Numerical Methods
Chapter 6 – Experimental Methods
Chapter 7 – Tension, Compression, Shear, and Combined Stress
Chapter 8 – Beams; Flexure of Straight Bars
Chapter 9 – Bending of Curved Beams
Chapter 10 – Torsion
Chapter 11 – Flat Plates
Chapter 12 – Columns and Other Compression Members
Chapter 13 – Shells of Revolution; Pressure Vessels; Pipes
Chapter 14 – Bodies in Contact Undergoing Direct Bearing and Shear Stress
Chapter 15 – Elastic Stability
Chapter 16 – Dynamic and Temperature Stresses
Chapter 17 – Stress Concentration Factors
Appendix A – Properties of a Plane Area
Appendix B – Glossary
Appendix C – Composite Materials

In all, there are over 5,000 formulas for over 1,500 different load/support conditions for various structural members.

== Editions ==
- 1st Edition 1938
- 2nd Edition 1943
- 3rd Edition 1954
- 4th Edition 1965
- 5th Edition 1975 ISBN 0070530319 – ISBN 0070859833
- 6th Edition 1989 ISBN 0071003738 – ISBN 0070725411
- 7th Edition September 13, 2001 (851 Pages) ISBN 007072542X – ISBN 0071210598
- 8th Edition November 28, 2011 (1072 Pages) ISBN 9780071742474 – ISBN 0071742476
- 9th Edition March 9, 2020 (928 Pages) ISBN 9781260453751

== Biography ==
Raymond J. Roark was Professor Emeritus of Mechanics at the University of Wisconsin.

Warren C. Young was professor emeritus in the department of Engineering Mechanics at the University of Wisconsin, Madison, where he was on the faculty for over 40 years. Dr. Young also taught as a visiting professor at Bengal Engineering College in Calcutta, India, and served as chief of the Energy Manpower and Training Project sponsored by USAir in Bandung, Indonesia.

Richard G. Budynas is professor of mechanical engineering at Rochester Institute of Technology. He is author of a newly revised McGraw-Hill textbook, Applied Strength and Applied Stress Analysis, 2nd Edition.

Ali M. Sadegh is a professor and the Founder and Director of the Center for Advanced Engineering Design at The City College of New York. He is a Licensed Professional Engineer, P.E., and a Certified Manufacturing Engineer, CMfgE.
