= Jim Evenson =

American gridiron football player (1947–2008)

Profile
- Position: Running back

Personal information
- Born: January 9, 1947; Hillsboro, Oregon, U.S.
- Died: January 30, 2008 (aged 61); Portland, Oregon, U.S.
- Listed height: 6 ft 3 in (1.91 m)
- Listed weight: 230 lb (104 kg)

Career information
- College: Oregon
- NFL draft: 1970: 4th round, 90th overall pick

Career history
- 1968–1972: BC Lions
- 1973–1974: Ottawa Rough Riders
- 1975: Portland Thunder - WFL

Awards and highlights
- Grey Cup champion (1973); Eddie James Memorial Trophy (1971); 2× CFL All-Star (1970, 1971); CFL East All-Star (1973); 4× CFL West All-Star (1968, 1969, 1970, 1971)

Career CFL statistics
- Rushing yards: 7,060
- Rushing average: 4.8
- Rushing touchdowns: 37
- Receptions: 116
- Receiving yards: 1,147
- Receiving touchdowns: 5
- Stats at CFL.ca (archived)
- Canadian Football Hall of Fame (Class of 2026)

James Lee Evenson (January 9, 1947 – January 30, 2008) was an American professional football running back who played seven seasons in the Canadian Football League (CFL) for the British Columbia Lions and Ottawa Rough Riders. Evenson won the Eddie James Memorial Trophy in 1971. He was a part of the Rough Riders 1973 Grey Cup winning team. Evenson played college football at University of Oregon. He finished his career with a brief stint with the Portland Thunder of the up-start WFL, where he rushed for 439 yards on 99 carries scoring one touchdown. Evenson also caught 18 passes for 108 yards. Evenson died on January 30, 2008, at the age of 61.

In 2026, he got inducted into the Canadian Football Hall of Fame.
