= Melvin Byrd =

American football player (born 1958)

No. 10
- Position: Defensive back

Personal information
- Born: December 17, 1958 (age 67); Hampton, Virginia, U.S.
- Listed height: 5 ft 9 in (1.75 m)
- Listed weight: 160 lb (73 kg)

Career information
- High school: Vanden (Fairfield, California)
- College: UC Davis
- NFL draft: 1981: undrafted

Career history
- Oakland Raiders (1981)*; BC Lions (1982–1987)
- * Offseason or practice squad member only

Awards and highlights
- Grey Cup champion (1985); 2× CFL West All-Star (1985, 1987)

Melvin Glynn Byrd (born December 17, 1958) is an American former professional football defensive back who played six seasons in the Canadian Football League (CFL) with the BC Lions. He played college football at the University of California, Davis.

== Early life ==
Melvin Glynn Byrd was born on December 17, 1958, in Hampton, Virginia. He attended Vanden High School in Fairfield, California.

Byrd first played college football at Solano Community College. He then transferred to the University of California, Davis, where he was a three-year letterman for the UC Davis Aggies from 1978 to 1980. He graduated from UC Davis with a degree in community recreation planning.

== Professional career ==
Byrd signed with the defending-Super Bowl champion Oakland Raiders in May 1981 after going undrafted in the 1981 NFL draft. He was released on July 30, 1981.

Byrd was signed by the BC Lions of the Canadian Football League (CFL) in April 1982. He was released in early August 1982, but soon re-signed. He only dressed in two games for the team during the 1982 season. Byrd then dressed in 80 games for the Lions from 1983 to 1987. On November 24, 1985, the Lions won the 73rd Grey Cup against the Hamilton Tiger-Cats by a score of 37–24. He was named a CFL West All-Star in both 1985 and 1987. Byrd retired after the 1987 season. He finished his CFL career with totals of 82 games dressed, 24 interceptions for 580 yards and five touchdowns, six sacks, eight fumble recoveries, 56 kickoff returns for 1,373 yards, and 27 punt returns for 272 yards.
