= T. J. Lee III =

American gridiron football player (born 1991)

- Lee III with the BC Lions in 2026

No. 6 – BC Lions
- Position: Defensive back
- Roster status: Active
- CFL status: American

Personal information
- Born: March 20, 1991 (age 35); Houston, Texas, U.S.
- Listed height: 5 ft 9 in (1.75 m)
- Listed weight: 190 lb (86 kg)

Career information
- High school: West Seattle (Seattle, Washington)
- College: Eastern Washington
- NFL draft: 2014: undrafted

Career history
- BC Lions (2014–present)

Awards and highlights
- 2× CFL All-Star (2018, 2023); 4× CFL West All-Star (2018–2021, 2023); FCS national champion (2010); First-team FCS All-American (2013); 3× First-team All-Big Sky Conference (2011–2013)

Career CFL statistics as of 2026
- Def. tackles: 675
- Special teams tackles: 40
- Interceptions: 32
- Sacks: 8
- Stats at CFL.ca

T. J. Lee III (born March 20, 1991) is an American professional football defensive back for the BC Lions of the Canadian Football League (CFL).

== College career ==
Lee III played college football for the Eastern Washington Eagles from 2010 to 2013. He played in 49 games where he recorded 182 tackles, four interceptions, and seven forced fumbles.

== Professional career ==
Pre-draft measurables
Height	Weight	Arm length	Hand span	Wingspan	40-yard dash	10-yard split	20-yard split	20-yard shuttle	Three-cone drill	Vertical jump	Broad jump	Bench press
5 ft 8 5/8 in (1.74 m)	192 lb (87 kg)	30 7/8 in (0.78 m)	9 1/4 in (0.23 m)	6 ft 1 1/4 in (1.86 m)	4.59 s	1.65 s	2.68 s	4.48 s	7.39 s	35.5 in (0.90 m)	9 ft 9 in (2.97 m)	14 reps
All values from Pro Day

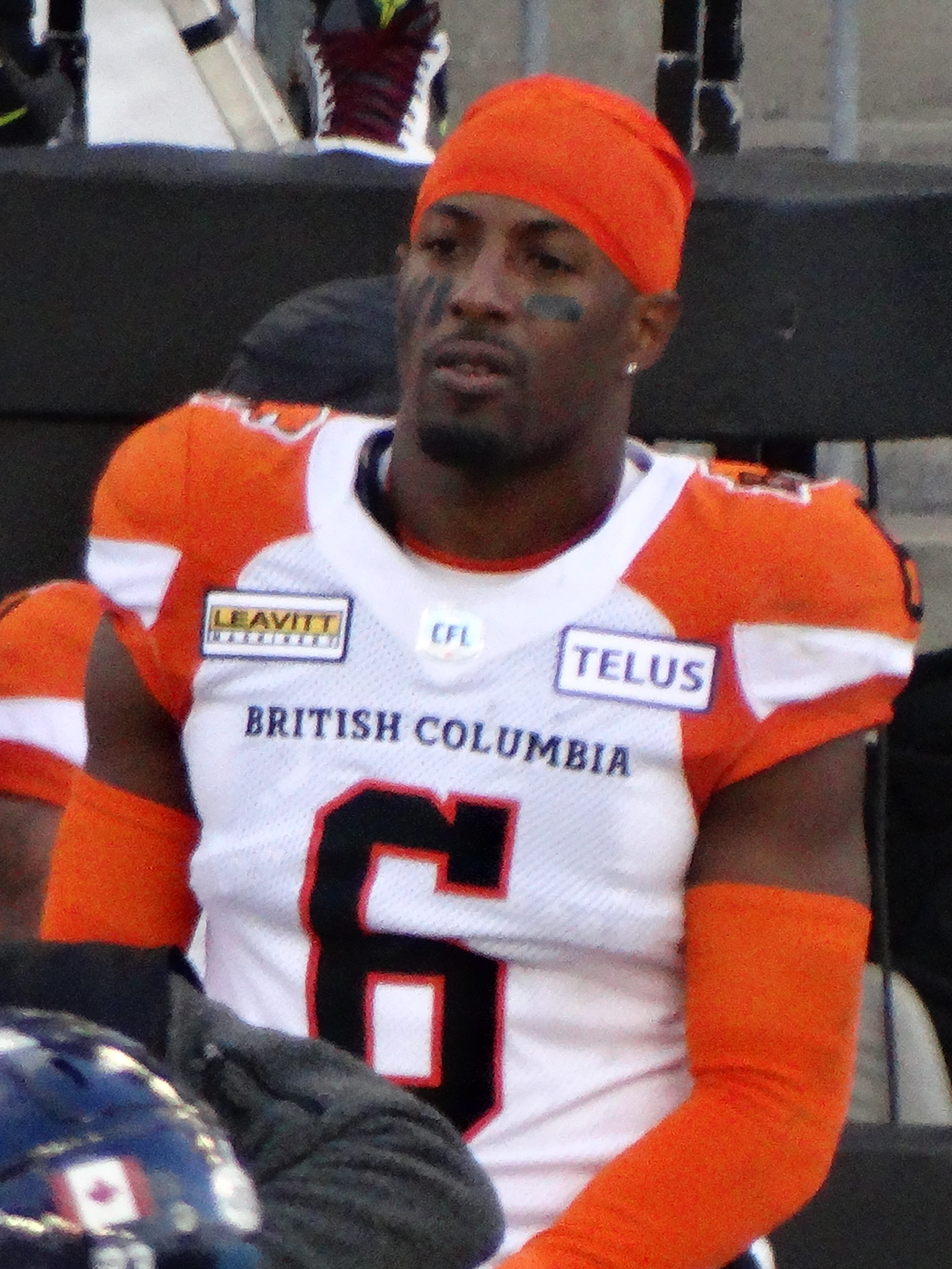
Lee with the Lions in 2022

Lee III signed with the BC Lions on May 22, 2014. In his first season with the Lions Lee III played in 8 games and contributed 24 tackles, 1 interception and 2 forced fumbles. He had a breakout season in 2015 when he played in 17 games and totaled 80 tackles, three sacks and four interceptions. Lee III missed most of the 2016 season after suffering an Achilles injury in late July. He was re-signed by the Lions only days before hitting the open market as a free agent in February 2017. Lee III returned to a prominent role within the Lions defense in 2017, playing in 15 games, contributing 49 tackles, and four interceptions.

Lee III was once again re-signed to a contract extension before becoming a free agent in February 2018. He became a CFL All-Star in 2018 with 81 tackles, three interceptions, two forced fumbles, and one touchdown. In 2019, he was the BC Lions Most Outstanding Defensive Player after contributing with 66 defensive tackles, six special teams tackles, four interceptions, and one forced fumble.

Lee III returned to the Lions following the cancelled 2020 season and played in all 14 regular season games in the shortened 2021 season. He was once again a major component of the team, amassing 71 defensive tackles, 12 special teams tackles, four interceptions and one forced fumble. On January 11, 2022, he signed another contract extension with the Lions. On July 29, 2022, Lee III played in his 100th regular season game, in a match against the Saskatchewan Roughriders. On January 25, 2023, Lee III signed a two-year contract extension with the Lions. Lee III was named a CFL All-Star in 2023, for the second time of his career. During the 2023 Western Final, Lee III suffered a second Achilles injury (this time on his other leg) causing him to miss BC's first six games of the 2024 season.

On February 11, 2025, Lee III's contract with the Lions expired and he became a free agent. Lions' general manager, Ryan Rigmaiden, advised that the team would be "moving on" from Lee III.

On September 10, 2025, Lee III was re-signed by the Lions, despite Rigmaiden's previous remark. On September 11, 2025, Lee III was assigned to the Lions' practice roster. On September 18, 2025, Lee III was recalled to the active roster. Lee's return to the Lions helped spark BC's struggling defense, and BC ended the regular season on a six-game winning streak; Lee played in the final five games. On July 3, 2026, Lee III was placed on the Lions' 1-game injured list. He rejoined the active roster on July 16, 2026. On July 30, 2026, Lee III was again placed on the Lions' 1-game injured list. He rejoined the active roster on August 7, 2026. On February 2, 2026, Lee III re-signed with the Lions, on a one-year contract extension. On July 3, 2026, Lee III was placed on the Lions' 1-game injured list. He rejoined the active roster on July 16, 2026. On July 30, 2026, Lee III was again placed on the Lions' 1-game injured list. He rejoined the active roster on August 7, 2026. On October 17, 2026, Lee III was placed on the Lions' reserve roster after suffering a knee injury the previous week. On October 22, 2026, Lee III was shifted to the Lions' 1-game injured list. He rejoined the active roster on October 30, 2026, ahead of the Western Semi-Final.
