= Brandon Yates =

American gridiron football player (born 2001)

- Yates with the BC Lions in 2026

No. 59 – BC Lions
- Position: Offensive lineman
- Roster status: Active
- CFL status: American

Personal information
- Born: March 3, 2001 (age 25); Middletown, Delaware, U.S.
- Listed height: 6 ft 4 in (1.93 m)
- Listed weight: 310 lb (141 kg)

Career information
- High school: Liberty (Henderson, Nevada)
- College: West Virginia (2019–2024)
- NFL draft: 2025: undrafted

Career history
- BC Lions (2025–present)

Career CFL statistics as of 2026
- Games played: 12
- Stats at CFL.ca

Brandon Yates (born March 3, 2001) is an American professional football offensive lineman for the BC Lions of the Canadian Football League (CFL). He played college football for the West Virginia Mountaineers.

== Early life ==
Yates was born on March 3, 2001, in Middletown, Delaware. He attended Liberty High School in Henderson, Nevada. As a senior, Yates was named to the All-4A Desert Southeast Conference first team. As a three-star recruit, he committed to play college football at West Virginia University.

== College career ==
Yates played college football for the West Virginia Mountaineers from 2019 to 2024. He played 61 games, starting 45, at center, guard and tackle throughout his career. In 2020 and 2023, Yates was an All-Big 12 honorable mention.

== Professional career ==
On September 8, 2025, Yates signed with the BC Lions of the Canadian Football League (CFL). On September 11, 2025, Yates was assigned to the Lions' practice roster. On October 3, 2025, Yates was promoted to Lions' active roster and made his first start the following day against the Calgary Stampeders. On October 16, 2025, Yates was reassigned to the Lions' practice roster, where he spent the remainder of the 2025 CFL season. On November 21, 2025, Yates was re-signed to a future/active contract by the Lions.

On June 26, 2026, Yates was placed on the Lions' reserve roster. He rejoined the active roster on July 6, 2026. On July 29, 2026, Yates was placed on the Lions' 1-game injured list. On August 12, 2026, Yates was shifted to the Lions' reserve roster. On August 29, 2026, Yates was shifted back to the Lions' 1-game injured list. He rejoined the active roster on September 3, 2026. On October 22, 2026, Yates was, for the third time that season, placed on the Lions' reserve roster. He rejoined the active roster on October 30, 2026, ahead of the Western Semi-Final.
