= Justin McInnis =

Canadian gridiron football player (born 1996)

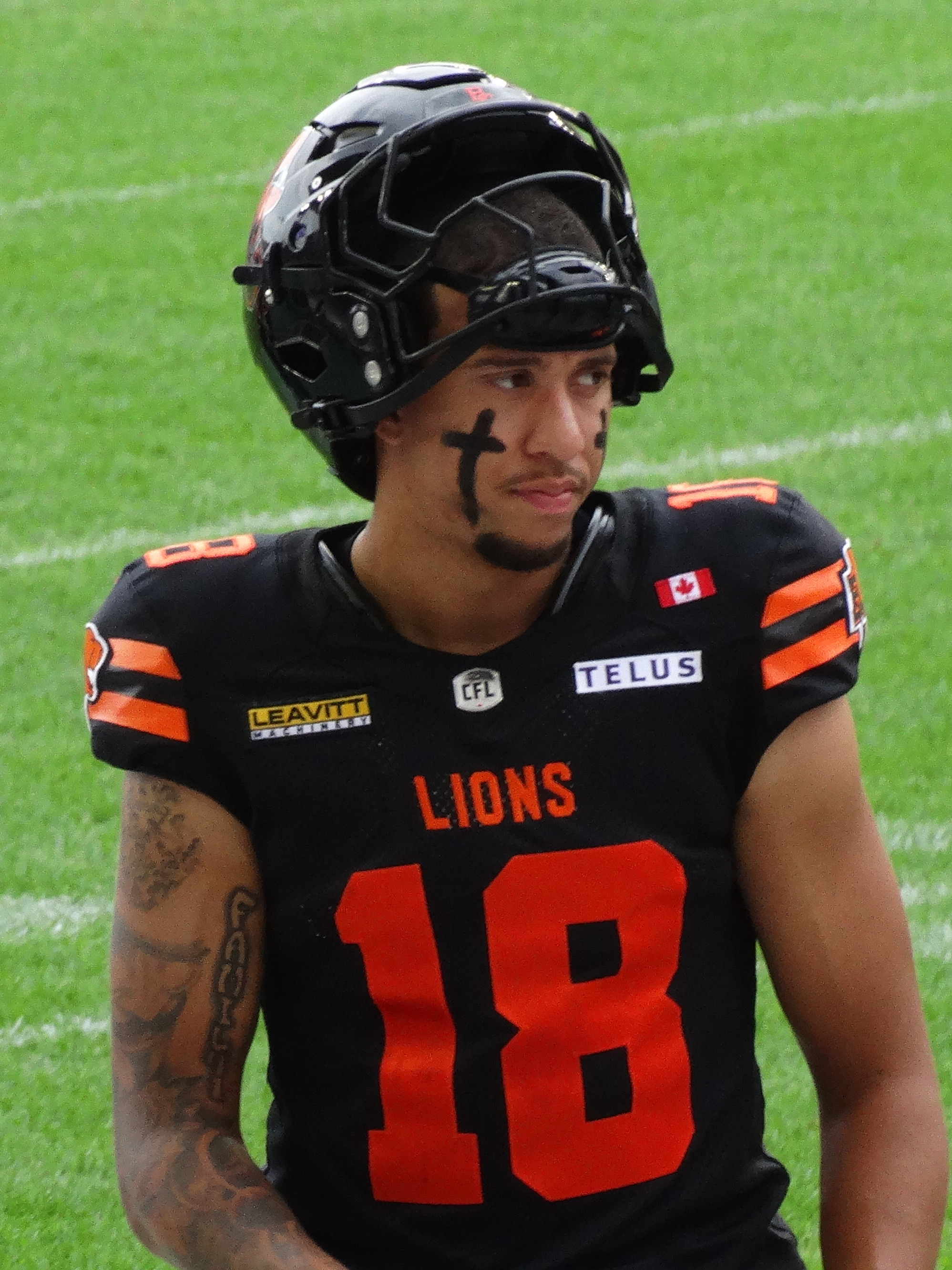
- McInnis with the BC Lions in 2025

No. 18 – BC Lions
- Position: Wide receiver
- Roster status: Active
- CFL status: National

Personal information
- Born: July 27, 1996 (age 30); Pierrefonds, Quebec, Canada
- Listed height: 6 ft 4 in (1.93 m)
- Listed weight: 214 lb (97 kg)

Career information
- College: Arkansas State
- CFL draft: 2019: 1st round, 6th overall pick

Career history
- Saskatchewan Roughriders (2019–2022); BC Lions (2023–present)

Awards and highlights
- 2× CFL All-Star (2024–2025); 2× CFL West All-Star (2024–2025); Second-team All-Sun Belt (2018)

Career CFL statistics as of 2026
- Receptions: 325
- Receiving yards: 5,071
- Receiving touchdowns: 24
- Stats at CFL.ca

Justin McInnis (born July 27, 1996) is a Canadian professional football wide receiver for the BC Lions of the Canadian Football League (CFL). He played college football at Arkansas State.

== College career ==
McInnis played college football at Arkansas State. Before attending Arkansas State, McInnis played junior college football at Dodge City Community College, where he recorded 49 receptions for 964 yards and 7 touchdowns as a freshman. During his career at Arkansas State, he played in 25 games, totaling 110 receptions for 1,548 yards and 10 touchdowns.

== Professional career ==
Pre-draft measurables
Height	Weight	Arm length	Hand span	Wingspan	40-yard dash	10-yard split	20-yard split	20-yard shuttle	Three-cone drill	Vertical jump	Broad jump	Bench press
6 ft 4 3/8 in (1.94 m)	212 lb (96 kg)	34 1/8 in (0.87 m)	8 7/8 in (0.23 m)	6 ft 6 1/2 in (1.99 m)	4.61 s	1.60 s	2.68 s	4.49 s	7.03 s	38.5 in (0.98 m)	10 ft 3 in (3.12 m)	9 reps
All values from Pro Day

=== Saskatchewan Roughriders ===
McInnis was selected sixth overall in the 2019 CFL draft by the Saskatchewan Roughriders. Before being drafted by the Roughriders, McInnis attended minicamps tryouts for the Tennessee Titans and the Indianapolis Colts of the National Football League. McInnis played in 14 games in his rookie season, and made 10 catches out of 18 passes thrown his way for 149 yards.

After the 2020 CFL season was cancelled, McInnis returned in 2021, but spent much of his sophomore season on the injured list as he played in just six games and recorded five catches for 83 yards. During the 2022 season, he had the best game of his career, as he had six catches for 111 yards and one touchdown on August 19, 2022, against the BC Lions. It was also the first touchdown of his professional career as he caught a four-yard pass from Mason Fine. McInnis played in 13 regular season games in 2022 where he had 33 catches for 364 yards and two touchdowns. He became a free agent upon the expiry of his contract on February 14, 2023.

=== BC Lions ===
On February 14, 2023, it was announced that McInnis had signed with the BC Lions to a two-year contract. In 2023, he played in all 18 regular season games where he had 46 receptions for 690 yards and five touchdowns. In the 2024 season, McInnis had a breakout year, where he recorded career-highs in all receiving categories, recording 92 receptions for 1,469 yards and seven touchdowns. He became the first Canadian to lead the league in receiving yards since Andy Fantuz in 2010. On July 13, 2024, McInnis tied a franchise record when he recorded 14 receptions and also had the sixth-highest receiving yardage total in Lions history with 243 yards. At the end of the season, he was named a CFL West Division All-Star and CFL All-Star for the first time in his career.

On October 22, 2026, McInnis was placed on the Lions' 1-game injured list. He rejoined the active roster on October 30, 2026, ahead of the Western Semi-Final.
