= Roark, Missouri =

Extinct town in Missouri, U.S.

Coordinates: 36°47′26″N 93°43′32″W

Roark (/rɔːrk/) is an extinct town in Barry County, in the U.S. state of Missouri.

A post office called Roark was established in 1888, and remained in operation until 1911. The community bore the name of the local Roark family.
