= Jerry Bradley (Canadian football) =

American gridiron football player (born 1945)

Profile
- Position: Defensive back

Personal information
- Born: August 6, 1945 (age 81); San Francisco, California, U.S.
- Listed height: 5 ft 11 in (1.80 m)
- Listed weight: 175 lb (79 kg)

Career information
- College: California

Career history
- 1967: Toronto Argonauts
- 1968–1970: BC Lions

Awards and highlights
- CFL West All-Star (1969); Second-team All-Pac-8 (1966)

Jerry Bradley (born August 6, 1945) is an American-born Canadian football player who played professionally for the Toronto Argonauts and BC Lions.
