= James Butler (running back) =

American gridiron football player (born 1995)

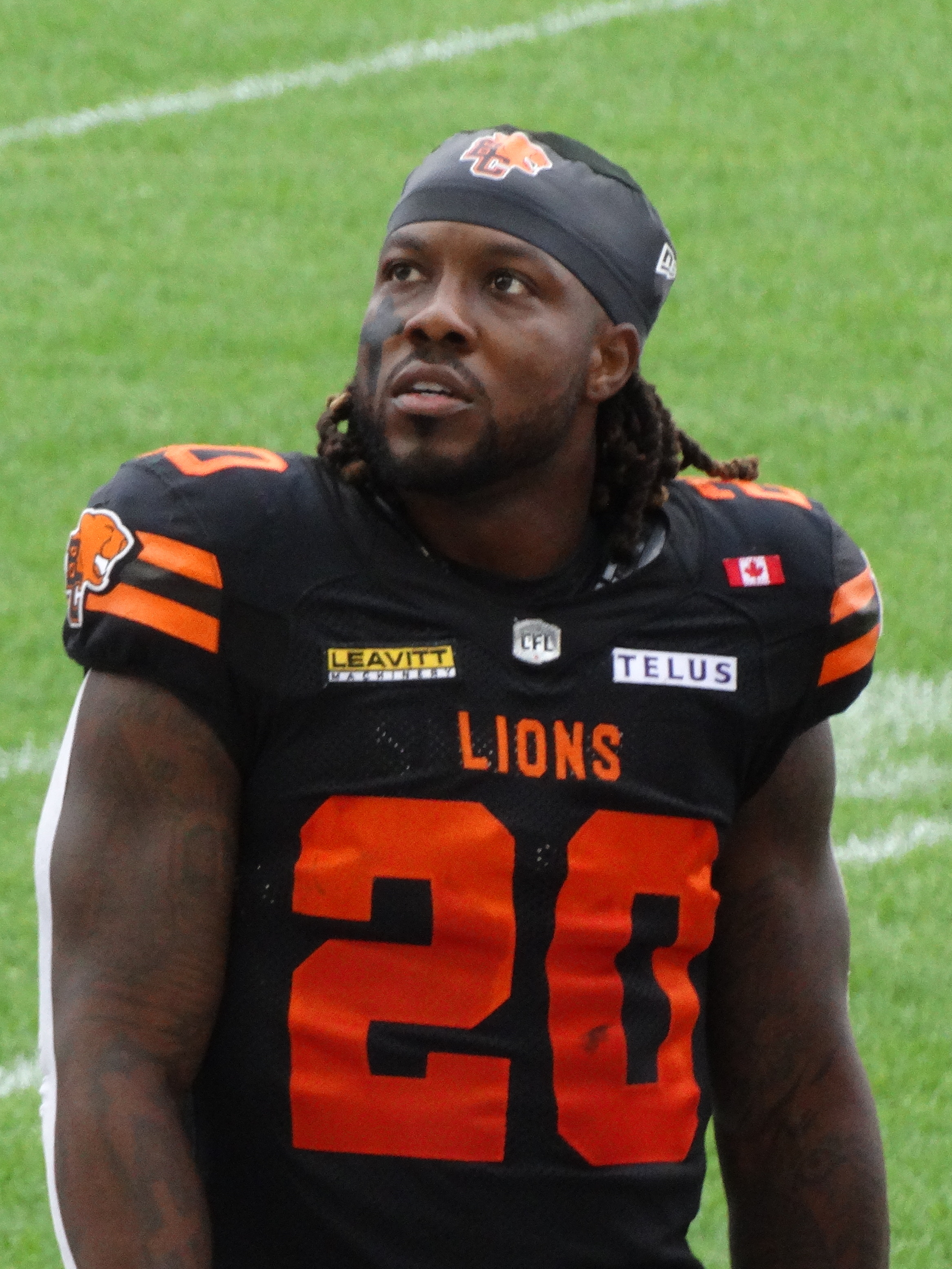
- Butler with the BC Lions in 2025

No. 20 – BC Lions
- Position: Running back
- Roster status: Active
- CFL status: American

Personal information
- Born: February 19, 1995 (age 31); Chicago, Illinois, U.S.
- Listed height: 5 ft 8 in (1.73 m)
- Listed weight: 215 lb (98 kg)

Career information
- High school: Bartlett High (Bartlett, Illinois)
- College: Nevada (2014-2016); Iowa (2017)
- NFL draft: 2018: undrafted

Career history
- 2018: Oakland Raiders*
- 2019: Saskatchewan Roughriders*
- 2019: Oakland Raiders*
- 2020: Houston Roughnecks
- 2021–2022: BC Lions
- 2023–2024: Hamilton Tiger-Cats
- 2025–present: BC Lions
- * Offseason or practice squad member only

Career CFL statistics as of 2026
- Games played: 88
- Rushing yards: 4,947
- Rushing average: 5.0
- Rushing touchdowns: 34
- Receptions: 270
- Receiving yards: 2,230
- Receiving touchdowns: 9
- Stats at Pro Football Reference
- Stats at CFL.ca

James Jeremy Butler III (born February 19, 1995) is an American professional football running back for the BC Lions of the Canadian Football League (CFL).

== College career ==
Butler played college football for the Nevada Wolf Pack from 2014 to 2016. He then transferred to the University of Iowa for his senior year where he played for the Iowa Hawkeyes in 2017.

== Professional career ==
Pre-draft measurables
Height	Weight	Arm length	Hand span	Wingspan	40-yard dash	10-yard split	20-yard split	20-yard shuttle	Three-cone drill	Vertical jump	Broad jump	Bench press
5 ft 8 3/8 in (1.74 m)	209 lb (95 kg)	29 5/8 in (0.75 m)	8 3/4 in (0.22 m)	5 ft 10 in (1.78 m)	4.58 s	1.62 s	2.69 s	4.49 s	6.91 s	35.5 in (0.90 m)	9 ft 6 in (2.90 m)	20 reps
All values from Pro Day

=== Oakland Raiders (first stint) ===
While eligible for 2018 NFL draft, Butler was not drafted and did not immediately sign with any National Football League (NFL) team. However, after attending mini-camp with the Oakland Raiders in May 2020, he signed with the team on July 30, 2018. He was released during training camp, but spent the 2018 season on the practice roster. After re-signing with the team in January 2019, he was waived on April 30, 2019.

=== Saskatchewan Roughriders ===
On May 13, 2019, Butler signed with the Saskatchewan Roughriders. However, he was released at the conclusion of the team's 2019 training camp on June 8, 2019.

=== Oakland Raiders (second stint) ===
On July 28, 2019, Butler re-signed with the Raiders. He spent time on the team's practice roster again and did not dress in a regular season game. He was not re-signed at the end of the season.

=== Houston Roughnecks ===
Butler signed with the Houston Roughnecks on January 19, 2020. He made his professional debut in 2020 with the Roughnecks where he had 46 carries for 221 yards and four touchdowns with another 11 catches for 42 yards and a receiving touchdown. He had his contract terminated when the XFL suspended operations on April 10, 2020.

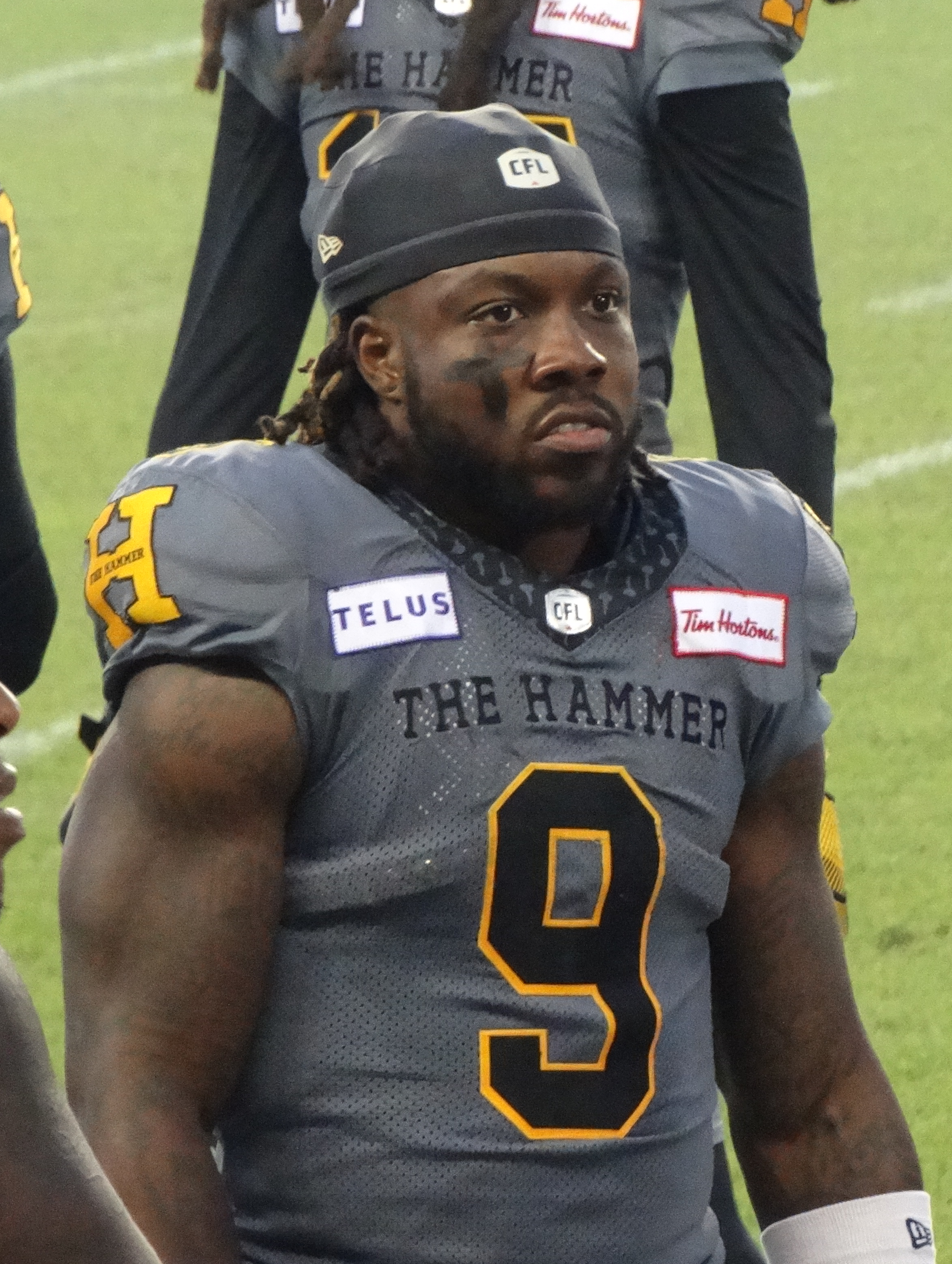
Butler with the Hamilton Tiger-Cats in 2024

=== BC Lions (first stint) ===
With both the CFL and XFL not playing for the rest of 2020, Butler signed a contract with the BC Lions on December 10, 2020. He made his CFL debut in week 1 against the Saskatchewan Roughriders on August 6, 2021, where he had eight rush attempts for 24 yards and four catches for 32 yards and a touchdown. He played in 11 regular season games where he had 101 carries for 497 yards and two touchdowns and 39 receptions for 243 yards and one touchdown.

In Butler's 2022 CFL season debut on June 11, 2022, against the Edmonton Elks, he scored four touchdowns, tying Geroy Simon and seven other BC Lions players for the club record for most touchdowns scored in a game. He played in 17 regular season games where he had 210 carries for 1,060 yards and seven touchdowns along with 53 receptions for 384 yards and four receiving touchdowns. He became a free agent upon the expiry of his contract on February 14, 2023.

=== Hamilton Tiger-Cats ===
On February 15, 2023, it was announced that Butler had signed a two-year contract with the Hamilton Tiger-Cats. In 2023, he played in 17 regular season games where he recorded 235 carries for 1,116 yards with seven touchdowns and 61 receptions for 527 yards with one touchdown. In the 2024 season, he began the season as the starter, but was eventually replaced by Greg Bell. Butler played in 11 regular season games where he had 110 rush attempts for 522 yards and two touchdowns along with 45 receptions for 372 yards and one receiving touchdown. As a pending free agent, he was released early on January 9, 2025.

=== BC Lions (second stint) ===
On January 9, 2025, Butler re-signed with the Lions, immediately following his release from the Tiger-Cats. On September 18, 2025, Butler was placed on the Lions' 1-game injured list. He rejoined the active roster on September 25, 2025. He played in 17 regular season games where he had 229 carries for 1,213 yards and a league-leading 11 rushing touchdowns. He also had 46 receptions for 439 yards and one receiving touchdown. In the West Semi-Final, Bulter had seven carries for 25 rushing yards and two catches for 26 receiving yards as the Lions defeated the Calgary Stampeders. In the West Final, he recorded 101 yards from scrimmage from 17 touches, but the Lions lost to the Saskatchewan Roughriders.

As a pending free agent entering the 2026 season, it was announced on January 29, 2026, that Butler had signed a two-year contract extension with the Lions.

On July 30, 2026, Butler was placed on the Lions' reserve roster after suffering a foot injury during the team's week 8 matchup against the Toronto Argonauts. He rejoined the active roster on August 7, 2026. On October 22, 2026, Butler was placed on the Lions' 1-game injured list. He rejoined the active roster on October 30, 2026, ahead of the Western Semi-Final.

== Personal life ==
Butler was born in Chicago, Illinois to parents Cornelia William and James Butler Jr.

He also runs a YouTube channel, Kicking It With JB.
