= Rorke =

Rorke is a surname. Notable people with the surname include:

- Daniel Rorke, Australian saxophonist
- Gordon Rorke (1938–2025), Australian cricketer
- Hayden Rorke (1910–1987), American actor
- James Rorke (c.1827–1875), British settler in southern Africa, owner of the farmstead Rorke's Drift
- John Rorke (1807–1896), Irish-born Canadian merchant and political figure in Newfoundland
- Joseph Rorke (1832–1907), Canadian businessman and politician from Ontario
- Margaret Hayden Rorke (1883–1969), American suffragist and writer
- Mary Rorke (1858–1938), British actor
- W. H. Rorke (fl. 1901–1902), American college football coach

== See also ==
- Rork (disambiguation)
- Rorke's Drift Art and Craft Centre, in KwaZulu-Natal, South Africa
- Battle of Rorke's Drift (1879), in what is now Natal Province, South Africa
