= Larry Crawford =

American gridiron football player (born 1959)

Profile
- Position: Defensive back

Personal information
- Born: December 18, 1959 (age 66); Miami, Florida, U.S.

Career information
- College: Iowa State

Career history
- BC Lions (1981–1989); Toronto Argonauts (1989)

Awards and highlights
- Grey Cup champion (1985); 4× CFL All-Star (1983, 1984, 1986, 1987); First-team All-Big Eight (1980)
- Canadian Football Hall of Fame

Larry Crawford (born December 18, 1959) is an American former professional football player who was a defensive back in the Canadian Football League (CFL). He was a CFL All-Star four times and was a part of the BC Lions' Grey Cup championship team in 1985.

== Early life ==
Crawford is a graduate of Miami Palmetto High School.

== College career ==
Crawford played college football at the Iowa State University.

== Professional career ==
Crawford played in the Canadian Football League for nine years and in 134 games. He played defensive back for the BC Lions from 1981 to 1989 and for the Toronto Argonauts in 1989. He was named a Division All-Star in each season between 1983 and 1987 and was a CFL All-Star four times. Upon his retirement, he ranked second all-time in punt return yards with 4,159 and fifth all-time in interceptions with 52.

Crawford was announced as a member of the Canadian Football Hall of Fame 2023 class on March 16, 2023.

== Coaching career ==
Crawford is the defensive back and wide receiver coach at Valley Christian High School located in Cerritos, California.

== Personal life ==
Crawford's son, J. P. Crawford, is a professional baseball player for the Seattle Mariners. His daughter Eliza played softball for the Cal State Fullerton Titans and his daughter Julia played volleyball for the Titans.
