= Sean Whyte (Canadian football) =

Canadian gridiron football player (born 1985)

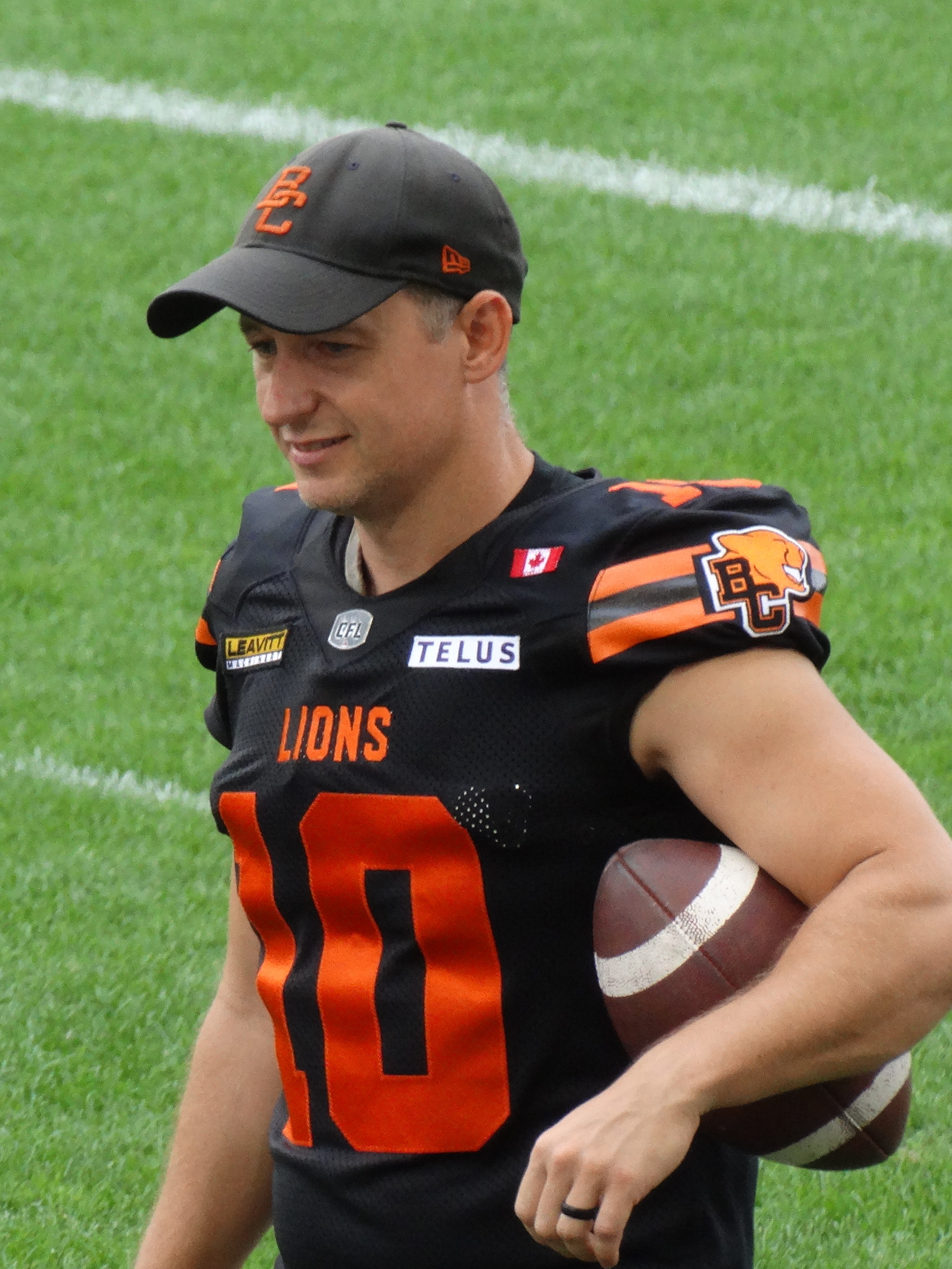
- Whyte with the BC Lions in 2025

No. 10 – BC Lions
- Position: Placekicker
- Roster status: Active
- CFL status: National

Personal information
- Born: October 23, 1985 (age 41); South Surrey, British Columbia, Canada
- Listed height: 5 ft 9 in (1.75 m)
- Listed weight: 187 lb (85 kg)

Career information
- CJFL: Big Kahuna Rams
- College: Santa Monica

Career history
- BC Lions (2007–2010); Montreal Alouettes (2011–2015); Edmonton Eskimos / Elks (2015–2021); BC Lions (2022–present)

Awards and highlights
- Grey Cup champion (2015); Dave Dryburgh Memorial Trophy (2019); Lew Hayman Trophy (2011); 2× CFL All-Star (2023, 2024); CFL East All-Star (2013); 3× CFL West All-Star (2023, 2024, 2025)

Career CFL statistics as of 2026
- Field goals made: 600
- Field goals attempted: 674
- Field goal %: 89
- Punts: 717
- Punting yards: 24,002
- Stats at CFL.ca

Sean Whyte (born October 23, 1985) is a Canadian professional football placekicker for the BC Lions of the Canadian Football League (CFL). He has also played as a punter in his career. He is a Grey Cup champion after winning with the Edmonton Eskimos in 2015. He is a four-time divisional all-star and two-time CFL All-Star while also winning the West Division's Most Outstanding Canadian Award in 2011. He is among the most accurate kickers in CFL history and has the second-best single season field goal accuracy (95.12% in 2025) and the second-longest consecutive field goal streak in CFL history (47 straight from 2023 to 2024).

== Amateur career ==
Whyte played college football for the Santa Monica Corsairs and Canadian Junior College Football for the Big Kahuna Rams. He finished his junior eligibility with the Rams in 2007 where he was also named to the All-Canadian Offensive Team as a placekicker.

== Professional career ==
=== BC Lions (first stint) ===
Whyte was signed by the BC Lions as a territorial exemption on May 29, 2007, where he practiced regularly with the team throughout the season. Later that year, he signed a three-year contract to remain with the Lions. In 2008, he spent the year on the practice roster.

In 2009, following an injury to incumbent Lions kicker, Paul McCallum, Whyte played in his first professional game on July 16, 2009, against the Edmonton Eskimos, where he made his only field goal attempt of 23 yards and made all five of his extra point conversions. He played in 11 regular season games, making 21 of 29 field goal attempts and punting 70 times with a 41.7-yard average before the kicking duties were given back to McCallum in October that year.

Whyte returned to the Lions in 2010 as the backup kicker and saw little game action due to McCallum's strong play. Whyte played in only two regular season games where he made all six of his field goal attempts and punted 15 times for a 40.1-yard average.

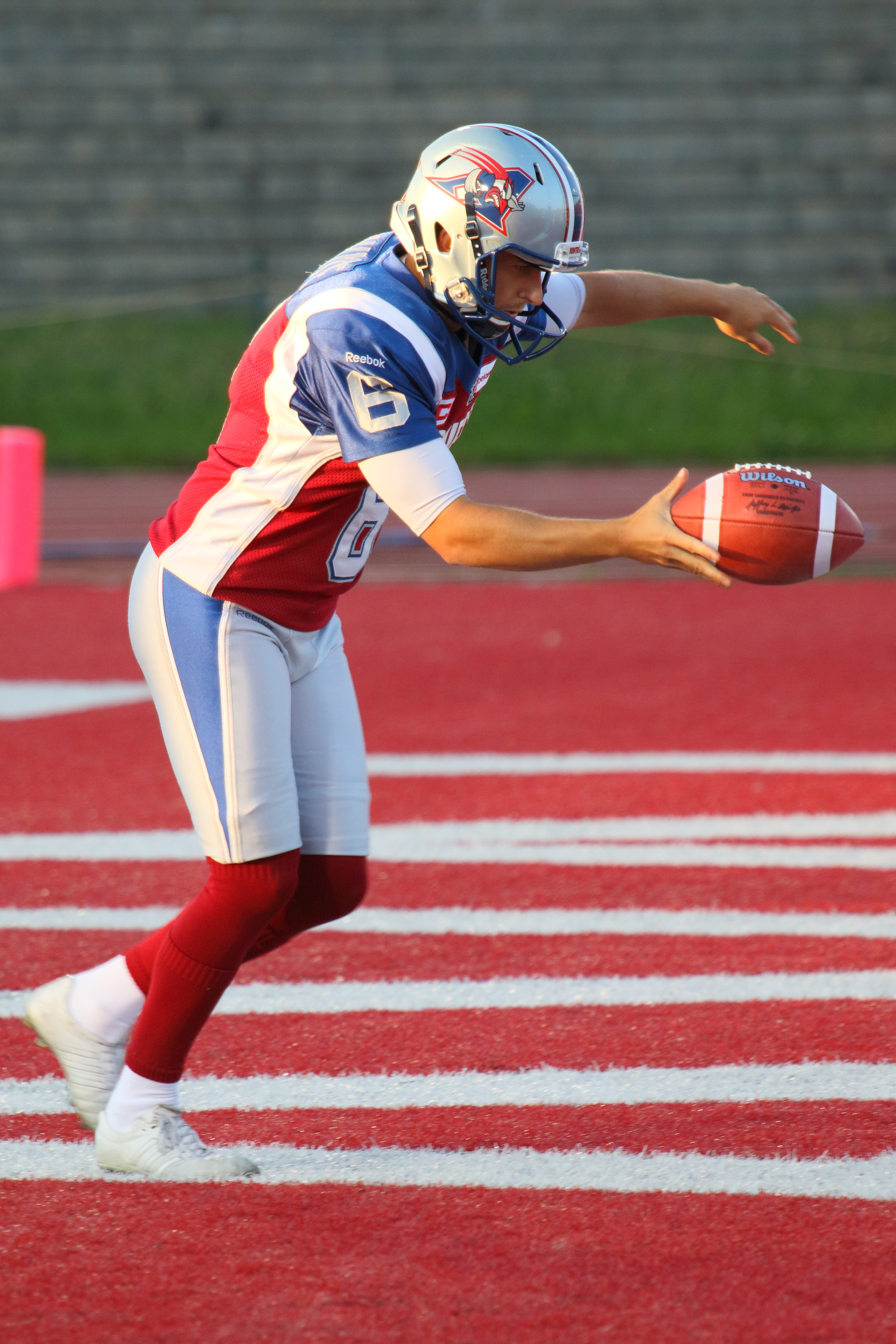
Whyte with the Montreal Alouettes in 2015

=== Montreal Alouettes ===
Whyte was traded to the Montreal Alouettes on the 2011 draft day on May 8, 2011, after the Lions drafted punter Hugh O'Neill. He won the kicking job following training camp and connected on 45 of 52 field goal attempts and punted 115 times for a 41.3-yard average throughout all 18 regular season games in 2011. Following his strong season, he won the East Division's Most Outstanding Canadian Award.

Whyte continued to play well for the Alouettes as he connected on 80.5% of his field goal attempts in 2012 and 82.0% in 2013, where he was named a Division All-Star for the first time in his career. He had his best season as an Alouette in 2014 when he made 41 of 47 field goal attempts for an 87.2% completion rate and had a career-high punting average of 44.9 yards. Despite his excellent season, Whyte fell out of favour with the Alouettes in 2015 as the team opted to dress rookie Boris Bede as the team's kicker due to his stronger leg. Whyte spent the first six games on the reserve roster behind Bede, who performed well enough for Whyte to be released on August 10, 2015.

=== Edmonton Eskimos / Elks ===
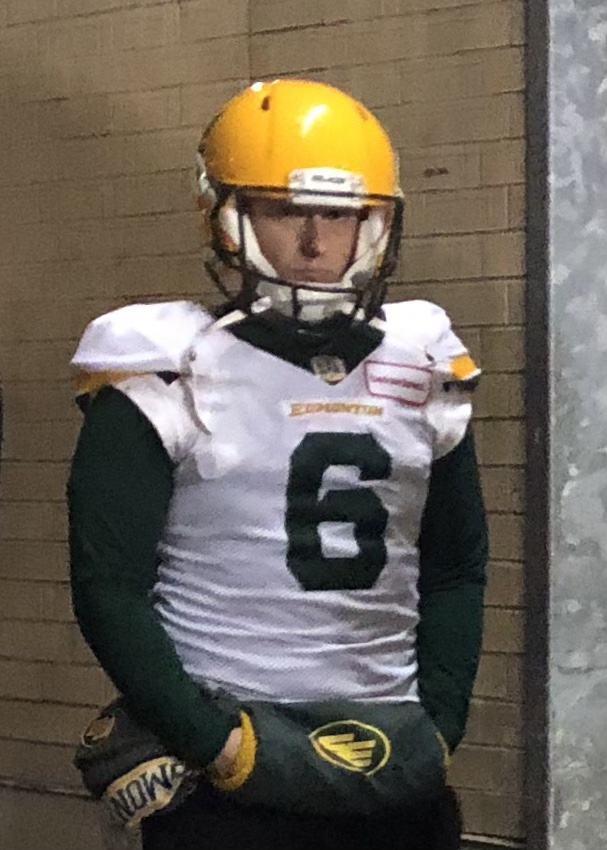
Whyte with the Edmonton Elks in 2021

On September 4, 2015, it was announced that Whyte had signed with the Edmonton Eskimos, after the team's incumbent kicker, Grant Shaw had been injured. He played in the team's final nine games of the regular season where he made 24 out of 26 field goal attempts. He also served as the team's punter for his first six games with the team until Shaw returned from injury. After the team finished first in the West and won the West Final, where Whyte made all three of his field goal attempts, he played in his first career Grey Cup game in 2015. Despite making just one of his three field goal attempts, the Eskimos prevailed and defeated the Ottawa Redblacks by a score of 26–20 in the 103rd Grey Cup game and Whyte won his first championship.

In his second year with the Eskimos, Whyte had his best season as he made 45 of 48 field goal attempts for a 93.8% completion rate, which was the third-best completion percentage in CFL history, at the time. However, he was not awarded All-Star status due to Justin Medlock kicking a CFL-record 60 field goals that year. After suffering an injury in 2017 that caused him to miss 12 games, he returned in 2018 where he made 36 of 40 field goal attempts.

In 2019, he was the unanimous selection for the Eskimos' Most Outstanding Special Teams Player. He signed a contract extension through the 2021 season with the team on December 31, 2020. He became a free agent upon the expiry of his contract on February 8, 2022.

=== BC Lions (second stint) ===
On the first day of free agency, February 8, 2022, Whyte re-signed with the Lions. Having worn #6 with the Alouettes and Elks, he opted to return to wearing #10, the number he'd previously worn during his first stint with the Lions and the same number worn by one of his favourite hockey players, Pavel Bure. In his first season back with the Lions, he connected on 36 of 39 field goal attempts for a rate of 92.3%, which was the sixth-best single season rate in CFL history, but Rene Paredes was named the All-Star in 2022 after making 54 of 60 attempts.

On December 7, 2022, Whyte signed a two-year contract extension with BC. In 2023, Whyte had the best season of his career, as he connected on 50 of 53 field goal attempts, a rate of 94.3%, which tied for the fourth-best completion percentage in CFL history (Boris Bede had a 94.9% completion rate that year). At the end of the season, he was named a divisional All-Star for the second time in his career and he was a CFL All-Star for the first time in his career.

Entering the 2024 season, Whyte had a streak of 18 consecutive field goals made, dating back to the 2023 season. On July 7, 2024, Whyte successfully kicked his 31st consecutive field goal, breaking the BC Lions franchise record previously held by Paul McCallum, and finished the game having made 32 in a row. On July 13, 2024, Whyte kicked seven field goals in a game versus the Saskatchewan Roughriders, extending his franchise record to 39 consecutive field goals and moving him into a tie for 2nd overall on the all-time league record. The seven field goals made had also tied a franchise single game record, which had only been done twice before, both times by Lui Passaglia. Whyte's streak came to an end at 47 consecutive field goals on August 24, 2024, against the Ottawa Redblacks, when his 37-yard field goal attempt was partially blocked by Jovan Santos-Knox. Whyte finished the 2024 season having made 50 of 53 field goal attempts, a rate of 94.3%, identical to his 2023 season. At the end of the year, he was named a CFL All-Star.

On January 7, 2025, Whyte signed a one-year contract extension with BC. He continued his exemplary play from the previous season as he again had a cross-season consecutive field goal streak that came to an end on August 7, 2025, at 32 in a row, which was the second-highest in franchise history and fifth-highest in CFL history. Whyte finished the season having made 39 of 41 field goal attempts, for a success rate of 95.1%, resulting in the best season in his career, the best in franchise history, and the second-best in CFL history. During the season, he also surpassed Terry Baker and Dave Cutler in the CFL's all-time scoring list at ninth place with 2,282 points. At the end of the season, he was named a Divisional All-Star for the fourth time in his career. In the West Semi-Final, Whyte was four-for-four on field goal attempts including the game-winner with no time remaining as the Lions won 33–30 over the Calgary Stampeders. He missed his only field goal attempt of 42 yards in the West Final where the Lions were defeated by the Saskatchewan Roughriders 24–21.

On January 6, 2026, The Lions signed Whyte to a one-year contract extension. On May 22, 2026, Whyte was placed on the Lions' suspended list, indicating that he had been suspended by the CFL. On May 25, 2026, Whyte's suspension was lifted and he rejoined the active roster.

== Personal life ==
Whyte was born to parents Pat and Tom and has two siblings, Jeff and Jennifer. In September 2024, his daughter, Mya Rose Whyte, was born.
