= Ryan Rigmaiden =

American football player (born 1998)

BC Lions
- Position: General manager

Awards and highlights
- Grey Cup champion (2019); ArenaBowl champion (2010); ArenaCup champion (2009)

Ryan Rigmaiden is an American professional football executive who is the general manager for the BC Lions of the Canadian Football League (CFL).

== Early life ==
Rigmaiden is from Spokane, Washington. He attended Shadle Park High School. He was a contributor for Scout.com from 2002 to 2005.

== Executive career ==
In 2006, Rigmaiden became the director of player personnel for the Spokane Shock of the af2. He was promoted to general manager (GM) in 2010. He helped the Shock win ArenaCup X in 2009 and ArenaBowl XXIII in 2010. Spokane had an overall record of 88–31 during Rigmaiden's time there. He served as the Shock's GM through the 2013 season.

Rigmaiden was a scout for the BC Lions of the Canadian Football League (CFL) from 2012 to 2013. On February 11, 2014, he officially stepped down as the Shock's GM to become the Director of U.S. Scouting for the Lions. Although he still remained a consultant for the Shock in 2014. Rigmaiden was the Lions' Director of U.S. Scouting from 2014 to 2017.

Rigmaiden served as the director of college scouting for the CFL's Winnipeg Blue Bombers from 2018 to 2020. The Blue Bombers won the 107th Grey Cup in 2019. On December 12, 2019, it was reported that the Montreal Alouettes had offered Rigmaiden the team's GM job.

Rigmaiden returned to the Lions as Director of U.S. Scouting in 2021. He was the assistant general manager and director of player personnel from 2022 to 2024. On November 10, 2024, he declined an interview for the Edmonton Elks' GM job. On November 20, 2024, Rigmaiden was promoted to GM of the Lions. He hired Buck Pierce to be the team's new head coach.

== Personal life ==
Rigmaiden lives in North Carolina.
