= 2020 BC Lions season =

Canadian football team season

- General manager: Ed Hervey
- Head coach: Rick Campbell
- Home stadium: BC Place

Results
- Record: N/A
- Division place: N/A, West
- Playoffs: Season cancelled

The 2020 BC Lions season was scheduled to be the 63rd season for the team in the Canadian Football League (CFL) and their 67th overall. Training camps, pre-season games, and regular season games were initially postponed due to the COVID-19 pandemic. The CFL announced on April 7, 2020 that the start of the 2020 CFL season would not occur before July 2020. On May 20, 2020, it was announced that the league would likely not begin regular season play prior to September 2020. On August 17, 2020 however, the season was officially cancelled due to COVID-19.

This would have been the third season with Ed Hervey as the Lions' general manager. The Lions' incumbent head coach, DeVone Claybrooks, was fired on November 6, 2019 after one season. Rick Campbell was announced as the team's head coach on December 2, 2019.

The Lions were scheduled to hold their training camp at Hillside Stadium in Kamloops, British Columbia for the 11th straight year. However, due to the COVID-19 pandemic in British Columbia, this was postponed and the Lions will fulfill the last year of their contract in 2021.

== CFL national draft ==
The 2020 CFL National Draft took place on April 30, 2020. The Lions were scheduled to select third in each round, less any traded picks, after finishing third-last in the 2019 league standings. However, the club traded their third and 12th overall selections to the Calgary Stampeders in exchange for the first and 15th overall picks. Selecting first overall for the first time since the 1999 CFL draft, the Lions selected linebacker, Jordan Williams.

The Lions acquired an additional fifth-round pick after trading a negotiation list player and a fourth-round pick to the Stampeders for Justin Renfrow. The team also sent a sixth-round selection to Montreal in part of the trade for Tyrell Sutton.

Round	Pick	Player	Position	School	Hometown
1	3	Jordan Williams	LB	East Carolina	Louisville, KY
2	12	Nathan Rourke	QB	Ohio	Oakville, ON
3	23	Courtney Hammond	DL	Western Oregon	Corvallis, OR
5	40	Matt Guevremont	OL	Indiana (PA)	Pickering, ON
5	43	Cordell Hastings	WR	Acadia	Calgary, AB
7	58	Kayden Johnson	RB	York	Kerrobert, SK
8	67	Damian Jamieson	LB	York	Oakville, ON

=== CFL global draft ===
The 2020 CFL global draft was scheduled to take place on April 16, 2020. However, due to the COVID-19 pandemic, this draft and its accompanying combine were postponed to occur just before the start of training camp, which was ultimately cancelled. The Lions were scheduled to select third in each round with the number of rounds never announced.

== Planned schedule ==
=== Preseason ===
Week	Game	Date	Kickoff	Opponent	TV	Venue
A	Bye					
B	1	Sat, May 30	1:00 p.m. PDT	at Edmonton Football Team	NA	Commonwealth Stadium
C	2	Fri, June 5	7:00 p.m. PDT	vs. Calgary Stampeders	NA	BC Place

=== Regular season ===
Week	Game	Date	Kickoff	Opponent	TV	Venue
1	1	Thu, June 11	6:00 p.m. PDT	at Edmonton Football Team	TSN	Commonwealth Stadium
2	2	Thu, June 18	6:00 p.m. PDT	at Calgary Stampeders	TSN	McMahon Stadium
3	3	Sat, June 27	4:00 p.m. PDT	vs. Edmonton Football Team	TSN	BC Place
4	4	Sat, July 4	6:30 p.m. PDT	at Saskatchewan Roughriders	TSN	Mosaic Stadium
5	5	Sat, July 11	7:00 p.m. PDT	vs. Ottawa Redblacks	TSN	BC Place
6	6	Thu, July 16	5:30 p.m. PDT	at Winnipeg Blue Bombers	TSN	IG Field
7	7	Thu, July 23	7:00 p.m. PDT	vs. Montreal Alouettes	TSN/RDS	BC Place
8	8	Sat, Aug 1	4:00 p.m. PDT	at Montreal Alouettes	TSN/RDS	Molson Stadium
9	9	Sat, Aug 8	7:00 p.m. PDT	at Saskatchewan Roughriders	TSN	Mosaic Stadium
10	10	Sat, Aug 15	7:00 p.m. PDT	vs. Calgary Stampeders	TSN	BC Place
11	Bye					
12	11	Fri, Aug 28	7:00 p.m. PDT	vs. Hamilton Tiger-Cats	TSN	BC Place
13	12	Thu, Sept 3	4:30 p.m. PDT	at Ottawa Redblacks	TSN	TD Place Stadium
14	13	Sat, Sept 12	7:00 p.m. PDT	vs. Toronto Argonauts	TSN	BC Place
15	Bye					
16	14	Sat, Sept 26	7:00 p.m. PDT	vs. Saskatchewan Roughriders	TSN	BC Place
17	15	Fri, Oct 2	4:00 p.m. PDT	at Toronto Argonauts	TSN	BMO Field
18	16	Sat, Oct 10	4:00 p.m. PDT	vs. Calgary Stampeders	TSN	BC Place
19	Bye					
20	17	Fri, Oct 23	7:00 p.m. PDT	vs. Winnipeg Blue Bombers	TSN	BC Place
21	18	Fri, Oct 30	4:00 p.m. PDT	at Hamilton Tiger-Cats	TSN	Tim Hortons Field

== Team ==
=== Roster ===
BC Lions roster
**Quarterbacks**: -- Will Arndt; -- K. J. Carta-Samuels; 19 Grant Kraemer; -- Ricky Lloyd; 13 Mike Reilly; -- Vinny Testaverde Jr.; **Receivers**: 73 Gerardo Álvarez; 83 Joey Augustin; -- Devon Bailey; 16 Bryan Burnham; 86 Jevon Cottoy; 1 Lemar Durant; 84 Cam Echols-Luper; -- Rommel Guerrier; 80 Caleb Holley; -- Nih-Jer Jackson; -- John Jiles; 88 Shaq Johnson; -- Raphael Leonard; 70 Benjamin Plu; -- Dominique Rhymes; 72 Fernando Richarte; -- Joshua Simmons; -- Emmanuel Smith; -- Tyler Turner; -- Jesse Walker; -- Jamarius Way	**Running backs**: -- Ryan Fulse; 26 Jamel Lyles RB/KR; -- Andrew Pocrnic; -- Brandon Radcliff; -- Chris Rainey; 21 Brandon Rutley; 3 John White; **Fullbacks**: 34 David Mackie; 33 Wayne Moore; 20 Mario Villamizar; **Offensive linemen**: -- Charles Baldwin; 69 Brett Boyko; -- Chauncey Briggs; 65 Sukh Chungh; 61 Joel Figueroa; 51 Peter Godber; 66 David Knevel; -- Ryker Mathews; 50 Phillip Norman; 54 Andrew Peirson; 55 Andrew Peterson; -- E. J. Price; 67 Hunter Steward	**Defensive linemen**: 95 Darius Allen; -- Eric Assuoa; -- Brandon Banks; 71 Mat Boesen; -- Stephen Bowers; 98 Ryan Brown; -- Nordly Capi; -- Chris Casher; -- Micah Johnson; -- Ulric Jones; 94 Claudell Louis; 8 Jonathan Newsome; -- Charles Nwoye; 93 Anree Saint Armour; -- Robert Simmons; -- J. R. Tavai; -- Cameron Walker; -- Andrew Williams; **Linebackers**: 35 Mitch Barnett; -- Jordan Burton; -- Adrian Clarke; -- Dyshawn Davis; -- Quinlen Dean; -- Kevin Francis; 44 Isaiah Guzylak-Messam; 42 Kevin Haynes; 53 Jordan Herdman-Reed; 37 Adam Konar; -- Kenny Ladler; -- Bailey Laolagi; -- Kenneth Olugbode; 48 Noah Robinson	**Defensive backs**: -- Isaiah Bennett; 27 Victor Gamboa; -- Montre Gregory; 36 Aaron Grymes; -- Mister Harriel; 28 Jamie Harry; -- Taylor Hawkins; 18 Hakeem Johnson; -- Derek Jones; 6 T. J. Lee; 37 Keon Lyn; -- Benjamin Minaker; 4 Garry Peters; -- Kurron Ramsey; 25 O'Shane Samuels; -- A. J. Westbrook; **Special teams**: -- Jimmy Camacho K/P; 41 Sergio Castillo K/P; 40 Tanner Doll LS; -- Stefan Flintoft P; 43 Greg Hutchins K/P
Italics indicate American player • **Bold** indicates Global player • 102 Roster; Roster updated 2020-08-17 • Depth chart • Transactions

=== Coaching staff ===
BC Lions staff
**Front office and support staff**: Owner – David Braley; President and ceo – Rick LeLacheur; General manager – Ed Hervey; Director of player personnel and player development – Torey Hunter; Director of football operations – Neil McEvoy; Director of Canadian Scouting & CFL Draft Coordinator – Geroy Simon; Southeast Regional Scout –Uzooma Okeke; East Regional Scout –Rob Ralph; Video assistant – Andrew Millin; Head athletic therapist – Tristan Sandhu; Assistant athletic therapist – Chris Wong; Equipment manager – Unknown; Equipment assistant – Aaron Yeung; Equipment assistant – Brent Frid; Director of communications – Jamie Cartmell	**Head coaches**: Head coach – Rick Campbell; **Offensive coaches**: Offensive coordinator – Jordan Maksymic; Receivers – Jason Tucker; Running backs – Vacant; Offensive line – Kelly Bates; Offensive assistant – Danny O'Brien; **Defensive coaches**: Defensive coordinator – Rick Campbell; Defensive line – Leroy Blugh; Linebackers – Travis Brown; Defensive backs – Ryan Phillips; **Special teams coaches**: Special teams coordinator – Don Yanowsky; → Coaching staff
