= 2019 BC Lions season =

Canadian football team season

- General manager: Ed Hervey
- Head coach: DeVone Claybrooks
- Home stadium: BC Place

Results
- Record: 5–13
- Division place: 5th, West
- Playoffs: did not qualify
- Team MOP: Bryan Burnham
- Team MOC: Lemar Durant
- Team MOR: Jevon Cottoy

Uniform

The 2019 BC Lions season was the 62nd season for the team in the Canadian Football League (CFL) and their 66th overall. The Lions were eliminated from post-season contention following a week 18 loss to the Edmonton Eskimos on October 12, 2019.

The Lions played without Wally Buono as head coach or general manager for the first time since the 2002 season following his final appearance last year. Buono was replaced as head coach by DeVone Claybrooks, who entered his first season as a head coach and is the 26th head coach in franchise history. Current general manager, Ed Hervey, who was in his second season in that role.

The Lions held their training camp at Hillside Stadium in Kamloops, British Columbia for the tenth straight year.

Claybrooks was fired as head coach after one season on November 6, 2019.

== Offseason ==
=== Foreign drafts ===
For the first time in its history, the CFL held drafts for foreign players from Mexico and Europe. Like all other CFL teams, the Lions held three non-tradeable selections in the 2019 CFL–LFA draft, which took place on January 14, 2019. The 2019 European CFL draft took place on April 11, 2019 where all teams held one non-tradeable pick.

Draft	Round	Pick	Player	Position	School/Club team
LFA	1	7	Octavio González	DL	Fundidores de Monterrey
LFA	2	16	Fernando Richarte	WR	Dinos de Saltillo
LFA	3	25	Gerardo Álvarez	WR	Dinos de Saltillo
Euro	1	7	Benjamin Plu	WR	Thonon Black Panthers

=== CFL draft ===
The 2019 CFL draft took place on May 2, 2019. The Lions traded their first-round pick in 2019 to Winnipeg for a first round pick in 2018. The Lions exchanged their second-round pick for Tyrell Sutton and a third-round pick and they traded their third-round pick for Davon Coleman and a sixth-round pick.

Round	Pick	Player	Position	School	Hometown
3	26	Noah Robinson	LB	Missouri	Worcester, MA
4	33	Hakeem Johnson	DB	Western	Brampton, ON
5	42	Jonathan Harke	OL	Alberta	Sherwood Park, AB
6	49	Charles Nwoye	DE	British Columbia	Strathmore, AB
6	51	Mario Villamizar	FB	Wilfrid Laurier	St. Catharines, ON
7	60	Brad Lyons	DL	Simon Fraser	Port Coquitlam, BC
8	69	Jamel Lyles	RB	Manitoba	Surrey, BC

== Preseason ==
=== Schedule ===
Week	Game	Date	Kickoff	Opponent	Results		TV	Venue	Attendance	Summary
Week	Game	Date	Kickoff	Opponent	Score	Record	TV	Venue	Attendance	Summary
A	1	Sun, May 26	1:00 p.m. PDT	at Edmonton Eskimos	L 7–22	0–1	None	Commonwealth Stadium	23,549	Recap
B	Bye									
C	2	Fri, June 7	7:00 p.m. PDT	vs. Calgary Stampeders	W 38–36	1–1	TSN	BC Place	14,561	Recap

# Games played with colour uniforms.

== Regular season ==
=== Standings ===
West Division
Team	GP	W	L	T	Pts	PF	PA	Div	Stk	
Saskatchewan Roughriders	18	13	5	0	26	487	386	7–3	W3	Details
Calgary Stampeders	18	12	6	0	24	482	407	8–2	W1	Details
Winnipeg Blue Bombers	18	11	7	0	22	508	409	7–3	W1	Details
Edmonton Eskimos	18	8	10	0	16	406	400	3–7	L2	Details
BC Lions	18	5	13	0	10	411	452	0–10	L3	Details

=== Schedule ===
Week	Game	Date	Kickoff	Opponent	Results		TV	Venue	Attendance	Summary
Week	Game	Date	Kickoff	Opponent	Score	Record	TV	Venue	Attendance	Summary
1	1	Sat, June 15	7:00 p.m. PDT	vs. Winnipeg Blue Bombers	L 23–33	0–1	TSN/ESPN2	BC Place	18,058	Recap
2	2	Fri, June 21	6:00 p.m. PDT	at Edmonton Eskimos	L 23–39	0–2	TSN/ESPN2	Commonwealth Stadium	24,016	Recap
3	3	Sat, June 29	4:00 p.m. PDT	at Calgary Stampeders	L 32–36	0–3	TSN	McMahon Stadium	25,130	Recap
4	4	Sat, July 6	4:00 p.m. PDT	at Toronto Argonauts	W 18–17	1–3	TSN	BMO Field	11,428	Recap
5	5	Thurs, July 11	7:00 p.m. PDT	vs. Edmonton Eskimos	L 6–33	1–4	TSN	BC Place	17,026	Recap
6	6	Sat, July 20	6:00 p.m. PDT	at Saskatchewan Roughriders	L 25–38	1–5	TSN	Mosaic Stadium	31,602	Recap
7	7	Sat, July 27	4:00 p.m. PDT	vs. Saskatchewan Roughriders	L 18–45	1–6	TSN	BC Place	20,950	Recap
8	Bye									
9	8	Sat, Aug 10	4:00 p.m. PDT	at Hamilton Tiger-Cats	L 34–35	1–7	TSN/RDS	Tim Hortons Field	23,308	Recap
10	9	Thurs, Aug 15	5:30 p.m. PDT	at Winnipeg Blue Bombers	L 16–32	1–8	TSN/RDS2	IG Field	24,914	Recap
11	10	Sat, Aug 24	7:00 p.m. PDT	vs. Hamilton Tiger-Cats	L 10–13	1–9	TSN	BC Place	16,751	Recap
12	Bye									
13	11	Fri, Sept 6	4:30 p.m. PDT	at Montreal Alouettes	L 16–21	1–10	TSN/RDS	Molson Stadium	17,487	Recap
14	12	Fri, Sept 13	7:00 p.m. PDT	vs. Ottawa Redblacks	W 29–5	2–10	TSN/ESPN2	BC Place	15,052	Recap
15	13	Sat, Sept 21	4:00 p.m. PDT	at Ottawa Redblacks	W 40–7	3–10	TSN/RDS2	TD Place Stadium	21,573	Recap
16	14	Sat, Sept 28	7:00 p.m. PDT	vs. Montreal Alouettes	W 25–23	4–10	TSN/RDS	BC Place	17,353	Recap
17	15	Sat, Oct 5	7:00 p.m. PDT	vs. Toronto Argonauts	W 55–8	5–10	TSN	BC Place	16,786	Recap
18	16	Sat, Oct 12	4:00 p.m. PDT	at Edmonton Eskimos	L 6–19	5–11	TSN	Commonwealth Stadium	27,218	Recap
19	17	Fri, Oct 18	7:00 p.m. PDT	vs. Saskatchewan Roughriders	L 19–27	5–12	TSN	BC Place	18,043	Recap
20	Bye									
21	18	Sat, Nov 2	7:00 p.m. PDT	vs. Calgary Stampeders	L 16–21	5–13	TSN	BC Place	20,210	Recap

# Games played with colour uniforms.
# Games played with white uniforms.

== Roster ==
2019 BC Lions final roster
**Quarterbacks**: 10 Brandon Bridge; 2 Danny O'Brien; **Running backs**: 26 Jamel Lyles; 33 Wayne Moore; 21 Brandon Rutley; 20 Mario Villamizar; 3 John White; **Receivers**: 16 Bryan Burnham; 89 Duron Carter; 88 Shaq Johnson; 17 Ryan Lankford; 70 Benjamin Plu; 85 Rashaun Simonise	**Offensive linemen**: 69 Brett Boyko T/G; 61 David Foucault G/T; 51 Peter Godber C; 66 David Knevel T; 50 Phillip Norman C/G; 58 Justin Renfrow T; 67 Hunter Steward G/C; **Defensive linemen**: 9 Shawn Lemon DE; 91 Junior Luke DT; 78 David Ménard DT; 8 Jonathan Newsome DE; 56 Korey Toomer DE; 11 Odell Willis DE/DT	**Linebackers**: 24 Chris Edwards; 47 Frédéric Chagnon; 31 Maleki Harris; 42 Kevin Haynes; 53 Jordan Herdman-Reed; 37 Adam Konar; 48 Noah Robinson; **Defensive backs**: 29 Crezdon Butler; 32 Branden Dozier; 27 Victor Gamboa; 44 Isaiah Guzylak-Messam; 18 Hakeem Johnson; 6 T. J. Lee; 4 Garry Peters; 25 O'Shane Samuels; 7 Josh Woodman	**Special teams**: 12 Josh Bartel P; 41 Sergio Castillo K/P; 40 Tanner Doll LS; **Practice roster**: 73 Gerardo Álvarez WR; 83 Joey Augustin WR; 28 Jamie Harry DB; 43 Greg Hutchins K/P; 94 Claudell Louis DT; 54 Andrew Peirson C; 55 Andrew Peterson T; 72 Fernando Richarte WR; 93 Anree Saint-Amour DE; 63 Josiah St. John T; 96 Charles Wright DE	**Injured list**: 95 Darius Allen DE; 35 Mitch Barnett LB; 71 Mat Boesen DE; 65 Sukh Chungh G; 86 Jevon Cottoy SB; 1 Lemar Durant SB; 61 Joel Figueroa T; 76 Edward Godin DT; 36 Aaron Grymes DB; 57 Antonio Johnson T; 19 Grant Kraemer QB; 34 David Mackie FB; 59 Khadim Mbaye LB; 13 Mike Reilly QB; 64 Jean-Simon Roy C/G; 23 Anthony Thompson DB; Italics indicate American players **Bold** indicates global players Roster updated 2026-05-19; Depth Chart • Transactions

== Coaching staff ==
BC Lions staff
Front office and support staff: Owner – David Braley; President and ceo – Rick LeLacheur; General manager – Ed Hervey; Director of player personnel and player development – Torey Hunter; Director of football operations – Neil McEvoy; Director of Canadian Scouting & CFL Draft Coordinator – Geroy Simon; Southeast Regional Scout –Uzooma Okeke; Video assistant – Andrew Millin; Head athletic therapist – Tristan Sandhu; Assistant athletic therapist – Chris Wong; Equipment manager – Unknown; Equipment assistant – Aaron Yeung; Equipment assistant – Brent Frid; Director of communications – Jamie Cartmell	Head coaches: Head coach – DeVone Claybrooks; Offensive coaches: Offensive coordinator – Jarious Jackson; Receivers – Markus Howell; Quarterbacks – Drew Tate; Running backs – Nik Lewis; Offensive line – Kelly Bates; Defensive coaches: Defensive coordinator and linebackers – Rich Stubler; Defensive line – Chris Ellis; Defensive backs – Ryan Phillips; Special teams coaches: Special teams coordinator – Taylor Altilio; Special teams and offensive assistant – Keith Stokes; → Coaching staff
