= 2018 BC Lions season =

Canadian football team season

- General manager: Ed Hervey
- Head coach: Wally Buono
- Home stadium: BC Place Stadium

Results
- Record: 9–9
- Division place: 4th, West
- Playoffs: Lost East Semi-Final
- Team MOP: Ty Long
- Team MOC: Boseko Lokombo
- Team MOR: Claudell Louis

Uniform

The 2018 BC Lions season was the 61st season for the team in the Canadian Football League (CFL) and their 65th overall. The Lions improved upon their 7–11 record from 2017 and clinched a playoff berth following a week 19 win over the Edmonton Eskimos. They returned to the playoffs following a one-year absence where they missed the playoffs for the first time since 1996. However, the team lost the East Semi-Final to the Hamilton Tiger-Cats by a 40-point margin, which is the largest in the Lions' playoff history.

On November 30, 2017, Wally Buono stepped down as general manager, being replaced by Ed Hervey in that role. Buono stayed on as head coach, which was his 12th and final season in that role. He finished his Lions coaching tenure with a record of 129–86–1, making the playoffs in 11 of his 12 seasons coached and winning two Grey Cup championships.

This was the ninth consecutive season that the Lions held their training camp at Hillside Stadium in Kamloops, British Columbia. Main camp opened Sunday, May 20, 2018, with rookies reporting earlier.

== Offseason ==
=== CFL draft ===
The 2018 CFL draft took place on May 3, 2018. The Lions had seven selections in the eight round draft, but have made several trades for positioning. They traded their fourth-round pick to Ottawa for Odell Willis, but got first and second-round picks from Winnipeg in exchange for the Lions' second-round pick this year and a first-round pick next year. The team acquired Saskatchewan's sixth-round pick in exchange for Mike Edem and the Lions' eighth-round pick.

Round	Pick	Player	Position	School	Hometown
1	3	Peter Godber	OL	Rice	Toronto, ON
1	7	Julien Laurent	DL	Georgia State	Toronto, ON
2	16	David Mackie	RB	Western	Jackson's Point, ON
3	21	David Knevel	OL	Nebraska	Brantford, ON
5	34	Isaiah Guzylak-Messam	DB	Wilfrid Laurier	Hamilton, ON
6	47	Rashari Henry	DL	Wilfrid Laurier	Ottawa, ON
7	54	William Watson	WR	British Columbia	Surrey, BC

== Preseason ==
=== Schedule ===
Week	Date	Kickoff	Opponent	Results		TV	Venue	Attendance	Summary
Week	Date	Kickoff	Opponent	Score	Record	TV	Venue	Attendance	Summary
A	Bye								
B	Fri, June 1	6:00 p.m. PDT	at Calgary Stampeders	W 36–23	1–0	None	McMahon Stadium	24,681	Recap
C	Fri, June 8	7:30 p.m. PDT	vs. Winnipeg Blue Bombers	W 34–21	2–0	TSN	BC Place	15,237	Recap

# Games played with colour uniforms.

== Regular season ==
=== Standings ===
West Division
Team	GP	W	L	T	Pts	PF	PA	Div	Stk	
Calgary Stampeders	18	13	5	0	26	522	363	5–5	W1	Details
Saskatchewan Roughriders	18	12	6	0	24	450	444	7–3	W2	Details
Winnipeg Blue Bombers	18	10	8	0	20	550	419	4–6	L1	Details
BC Lions	18	9	9	0	18	423	473	4–6	L2	Details
Edmonton Eskimos	18	9	9	0	18	482	471	5–5	W1	Details

=== Schedule ===
Week	Game	Date	Kickoff	Opponent	Results		TV	Venue	Attendance	Summary
Week	Game	Date	Kickoff	Opponent	Score	Record	TV	Venue	Attendance	Summary
1	1	Sat, June 16	7:00 p.m. PDT	Montreal Alouettes	W 22–10	1–0	TSN/RDS/ESPN2	BC Place	20,182	Recap
2	Bye									
3	2	Fri, June 29	7:00 p.m. PDT	@ Edmonton Eskimos	L 22–41	1–1	TSN/ESPN2	Commonwealth Stadium	29,940	Recap
4	3	Sat, July 7	5:30 p.m. PDT	@ Winnipeg Blue Bombers	L 19–41	1–2	TSN	Investors Group Field	26,567	Recap
5	4	Sat, July 14	7:00 p.m. PDT	Winnipeg Blue Bombers	W 20–17	2–2	TSN	BC Place	19,541	Recap
6	5	Fri, July 20	4:30 p.m. PDT	@ Ottawa Redblacks	L 25–29	2–3	TSN/RDS	TD Place Stadium	21,319	Recap
7	Bye									
8	6	Sat, Aug 4	6:00 p.m. PDT	@ Calgary Stampeders	L 18–27	2–4	TSN	McMahon Stadium	25,075	Recap
9	7	Thurs, Aug 9	7:00 p.m. PDT	Edmonton Eskimos	W 31–23	3–4	TSN/ESPN2	BC Place	17,745	Recap
10	8	Sat, Aug 18	1:00 p.m. PDT	@ Toronto Argonauts	L 23–24	3–5	TSN/RDS2	BMO Field	18,104	Recap
11	9	Sat, Aug 25	7:00 p.m. PDT	Saskatchewan Roughriders	L 21–24	3–6	TSN	BC Place	22,873	Recap
12	Bye									
13	10	Fri, Sept 7	7:00 p.m. PDT	Ottawa Redblacks	W 26–14	4–6	TSN	BC Place	17,529	Recap
14	11	Fri, Sept 14	4:30 p.m. PDT	@ Montreal Alouettes	W 32–14	5–6	TSN/RDS	Molson Stadium	15,346	Recap
15	12	Sat, Sept 22	7:00 p.m. PDT	Hamilton Tiger-Cats	W 35–32 (2OT)	6–6	TSN	BC Place	18,794	Recap
16	13	Sat, Sept 29	1:00 p.m. PDT	@ Hamilton Tiger-Cats	L 10–40	6–7	TSN	Tim Hortons Field	23,623	Recap
17	14	Sat, Oct 6	4:00 p.m. PDT	Toronto Argonauts	W 26–23	7–7	TSN	BC Place	18,535	Recap
18	15	Sat, Oct 13	5:00 p.m. PDT	@ Calgary Stampeders	W 26–21	8–7	TSN	McMahon Stadium	23,563	Recap
19	16	Fri, Oct 19	7:00 p.m. PDT	Edmonton Eskimos	W 42–32	9–7	TSN	BC Place	20,463	Recap
20	17	Sat, Oct 27	4:00 p.m. PDT	@ Saskatchewan Roughriders	L 16–35	9–8	TSN	Mosaic Stadium	30,091	Recap
21	18	Sat, Nov 3	7:00 p.m. PDT	Calgary Stampeders	L 9–26	9–9	TSN	BC Place	24,114	Recap

# Games played with colour uniforms.
# Games played with white uniforms.

== Post-season ==
=== Schedule ===
Game	Date	Kickoff	Opponent	Results		TV	Venue	Attendance	Summary
Game	Date	Kickoff	Opponent	Score	Record	TV	Venue	Attendance	Summary
East Semi-Final	Sun, Nov 11	10:00 a.m. PST	vs. Hamilton Tiger-Cats	L 8–48	0–1	TSN/RDS/ESPNews	Tim Hortons Field	23,911	Recap

# Games played with white uniforms.

== Roster ==
2018 BC Lions final roster
Quarterbacks: 17 Cody Fajardo; 10 Jonathon Jennings; 14 Travis Lulay; Running backs: 24 Jeremiah Johnson; 46 Rolly Lumbala; 34 David Mackie; 33 Wayne Moore; 13 Tyrell Sutton; Receivers: 16 Bryan Burnham; 3 Ricky Collins; 88 Shaq Johnson; 86 Anthony Parker; 85 DeVier Posey; 18 Cory Watson	Offensive linemen: 61 Joel Figueroa T; 61 David Foucault G; 65 Chris Greaves G/C; 66 David Knevel T; 63 Jovan Olafioye T; 54 Andrew Peirson C; 67 Hunter Steward G; Defensive linemen: 90 Davon Coleman DT; 99 Julien Laurent DT; 9 Shawn Lemon DE; 94 Claudell Louis DT; 91 Junior Luke DT; 98 Ivan McLennan DE; 11 Odell Willis DE	Linebackers: 58 Micah Awe; 35 Mitch Barnett; 47 Frédéric Chagnon; 36 Dyshawn Davis; 56 Solomon Elimimian; 53 Jordan Herdman; 20 Bo Lokombo; 41 Ron Omara; Defensive backs: 31 Otha Foster; 44 Isaiah Guzylak-Messam; 6 T. J. Lee; 26 Anthony Orange; 4 Garry Peters; 25 Winston Rose; 43 Dom Termansen; 23 Anthony Thompson; Special teams: 40 Mike Benson LS; 1 Ty Long K/P	Practice roster: 42 Lee Bennett LB; 76 Edward Godin DE; 19 Ricky Lloyd QB; 39 Keon Lyn DB; 50 Phillip Norman T; 93 Ebenezer Ogundeko DE; 95 Michael Ramsay DT; 7 Shakeir Ryan RB; 29 Ronald Tyler DB; 80 Will Watson WR; Injured list: 84 Emmanuel Arceneaux SB; 48 Maxx Forde DT; 51 Peter Godber C; 28 Nathaniel Hamlin DB; 62 Cody Husband C; 57 Antonio Johnson T; 78 David Ménard DE; 2 Chris Rainey RB; 21 Brandon Rutley RB; 69 Charles Vaillancourt G/C; 83 Danny Vandervoort SB; Italics indicate American players Roster updated 2026-05-18; Depth Chart • Transactions

== Coaching staff ==
BC Lions staff
Front office and support staff: Owner – David Braley; President and ceo – Rick LeLacheur; Vice president of football operations – Wally Buono; General manager – Ed Hervey; Director of player personnel and player development – Torey Hunter; Director of football operations – Neil McEvoy; Director of Canadian Scouting & CFL Draft Coordinator – Geroy Simon; Southeast Regional Scout –Uzooma Okeke; Video assistant – Andrew Millin; Head athletic therapist – Tristan Sandhu; Assistant athletic therapist – Chris Wong; Equipment manager – Ken "Kato" Kasuya; Equipment assistant – Aaron Yeung; Equipment assistant – Brent Frid; Director of communications – Jamie Cartmell	Head coaches: Head coach – Wally Buono; Offensive coaches: Offensive coordinator and quarterbacks – Jarious Jackson; Passing game coordinator and receivers – Markus Howell; Running backs – Mike Lionello; Offensive line – Dan Dorazio; Defensive coaches: Defensive coordinator and defensive backs – Mark Washington; Defensive line – Randy Melvin; Linebackers – Chris Tormey; Assistant defensive backs – Stanley Franks; Special teams coaches: Special teams coordinator – Jeff Reinebold; Strength and conditioning: Strength and conditioning trainer – Chris Boyko; → Coaching staff
