= Ed Hervey =

American gridiron football player and executive (born 1973)

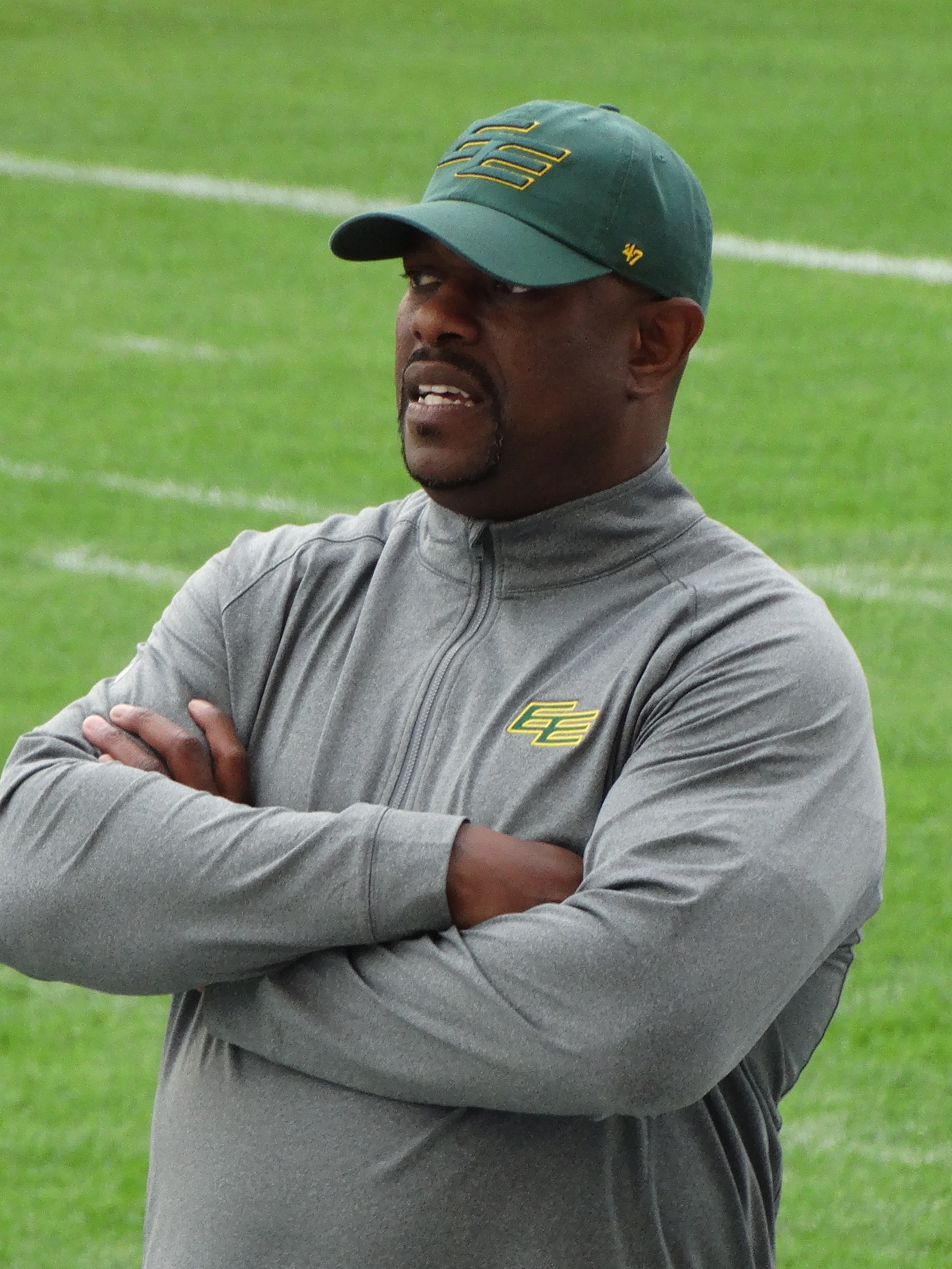
- Hervey with the Edmonton Elks in 2025

Edmonton Elks
- Title: General manager

Personal information
- Born: May 4, 1973 (age 53); Houston, Texas, U.S.
- Listed height: 6 ft 2 in (1.88 m)
- Listed weight: 195 lb (88 kg)

Career information
- Position: Wide receiver (No. 81)
- High school: Compton (Compton, California)
- College: USC
- NFL draft: 1995: 5th round, 166th overall pick

Career history

Playing
- 1995: Dallas Cowboys
- 1997: Oakland Raiders*
- 1998: Denver Broncos*
- 1998: Oakland Raiders*
- 1999–2006: Edmonton Eskimos
- * Offseason or practice squad member only

Operations
- 2007–2008: Edmonton Eskimos (West Coast scout)
- 2009–2012: Edmonton Eskimos (Head scout)
- 2013–2016: Edmonton Eskimos (GM)
- 2017–2020: BC Lions (GM)
- 2022–2023: Hamilton Tiger-Cats (Assistant GM)
- 2024: Hamilton Tiger-Cats (GM)
- 2025–present: Edmonton Elks (GM)

Awards and highlights
- Track All-American (1994); 4× Grey Cup champion (2003, 2005, 2015, 2026); Super Bowl champion (XXX); 2× CFL All-Star (2001, 2003); 2× CFL West All-Star (2001, 2003)

Edward Hervey (born May 4, 1973) is an American professional football executive and former player who is the general manager for the Edmonton Elks of the Canadian Football League (CFL). He played as a wide receiver in the CFL for the Edmonton Eskimos for eight years and also served as general manager of the Eskimos from 2013 through 2016, winning the 103rd Grey Cup to conclude the 2015 CFL season. He was later the general manager for the BC Lions from 2017 to 2020 and for the Hamilton Tiger-Cats in 2024. He played college football for the USC Trojans.

== Early life ==
Hervey attended Compton High School, where he played as a quarterback and wide receiver. He was selected to the All-Moore League team as a senior. In track, he helped the school win the California state 4 × 400 metres relay competition.

== College career ==
He moved on to Pasadena City College, where he played as a quarterback. As a freshman, he posted 12-of-28 completion for 116 yards and one touchdown, while rushing for 137 yards on 26 carries.

Hervey became a starter in 1992, registering 78-of-143 completions for 919 passing yards, 3 passing touchdowns, 791 rushing yards on 169 carries and 8 rushing touchdowns on his way to a 10–1 record. He was named the MVP of the Rose City Classic Bowl, as he ran for one touchdown and passed for another in a 28–27 win over the College of the Desert. He also received Junior College All-State and All-Mission Conference honors.

In track, he finished second in the 1992 California state community college 200 metres with 20.99 seconds and 400 metres with 46.41 seconds. As a sophomore, he recorded 20.65 seconds in the 200 metres and 46.02 seconds in the 400 metres, receiving South Coast Conference Track Male Athlete of the Year honors, after winning both events at the conference championships.

He transferred to the University of Southern California after his sophomore season and was converted into a wide receiver. He was considered the team's fastest player, with head coach John Robinson (also former coach of the Los Angeles Rams), saying Hervey was the fastest player he had seen on a football field, including ex-Ram and Olympic 4 × 400 metres relay gold medalist Ron Brown.

As a junior he was named a starter, but tallied only 22 receptions for 219 yards and a 15-yard touchdown pass, after suffering a sprained left ankle that forced him to miss 2 games and would limit him the rest of the season. The next year, he suffered a right knee sprain in the season opener and would only play in 8 games (4 games missed and 5 starts), finishing his college career with 41 receptions for 482 yards and 3 touchdowns. He was a teammate of All-American wide receivers Johnnie Morton and Keyshawn Johnson.

In track as a senior, he earned All-American honors in three events at the NCAA Track and Field Championships. He finished fifth in the 200 metres with 20.53 seconds; his best was a 20.40 seconds time at the Pac-10 championships, where he was third. He also ran the second leg on both the 4 × 100 metres and 4 × 400 metres relay teams that finished fourth and fifth respectively.

== Professional career ==
=== Dallas Cowboys ===
Hervey was selected in the fifth round (166th overall) of the 1995 NFL draft by the Dallas Cowboys. As a rookie, he was leading the team in kickoff returns during the preseason (8 for a 24.4-yard average), until fracturing his left fibula in the final week of training camp. Although he returned on September 6, he was declared inactive for every game during the season, as the Cowboys went on to win Super Bowl XXX. He was waived on August 20, 1996.

=== Oakland Raiders (first stint) ===
In 1997, he signed with the Oakland Raiders and was waived on August 24.

=== Denver Broncos ===
On February 13, 1998, he was signed by the Denver Broncos and released before the season started.

=== Oakland Raiders (second stint) ===
In 1998, he was signed by the Raiders and waived on August 26.

=== Edmonton Eskimos ===
Hervey played eight seasons for the Edmonton Eskimos in the Canadian Football League, and was a CFL all star in 2001 and 2003.

Over the course of his career Hervey posted 6715 yards receiving with 476 receptions in 118 career CFL games. In 2001, he had his best season stats-wise, when he registered 1447 yards on 77 receptions with 12 touchdowns. He was also a part of two Grey Cup winning teams. In 2006, he received the David Boone Memorial Award in recognition for his contributions to the community. On March 20, 2007, Hervey officially announced his retirement from professional football.

== Front office career ==
=== Edmonton Eskimos ===
After his playing career, Hervery served as the Eskimos' head scout until December 10, 2012, when he was named as the club's general manager. In 2015, the Eskimos won the Grey Cup. On April 7, 2017, the Eskimos held a press conference to announce the termination of Hervey's contract.

=== BC Lions ===
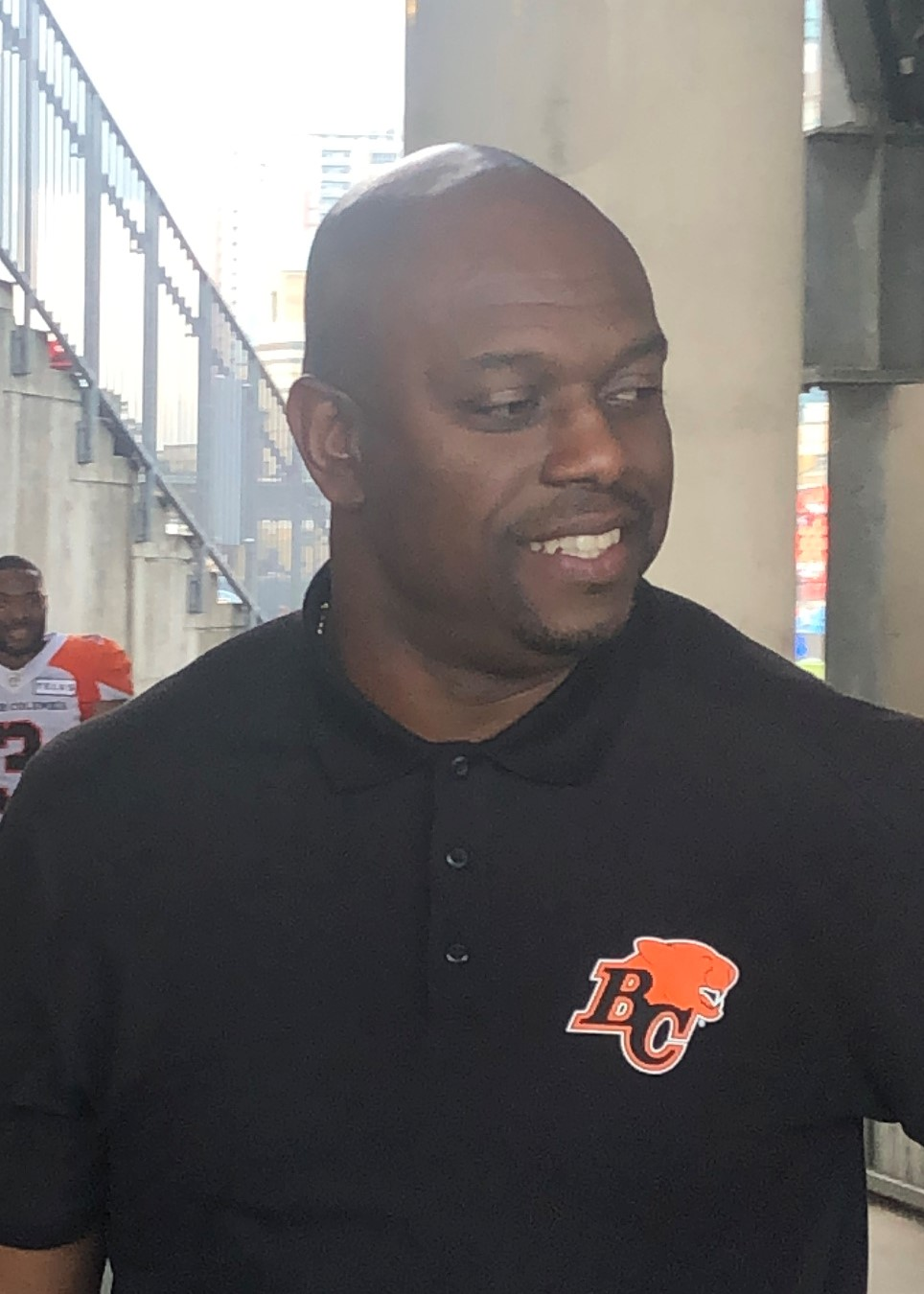
Hervey with the BC Lions in 2019

On November 30, 2017, Hervey was named the general manager of the BC Lions. Hervey's 2019 Lions missed the playoffs, and Hervey's handpicked head coach, DeVone Claybrooks, was fired after his first season on the job. Furthermore, Hervey's conduct during the season was criticized. His handling of the release of fan favorite and star linebacker Solomon Elimimian drew criticism from Elimimian's agent for its timing, as did Hervey's justification that he knew when a player's time was up; Elimimian still earned divisional All-Star honours for the season, and recorded a sack in each game he played against BC. Also during the season, Hervey was called out by the press for his refusal to shake the hand of Edmonton wideout Kenny Stafford. During the cancelled 2020 year, it was announced that Hervey had resigned from his position for personal reasons. Roughly one month later, TSN reported that when Hervey signed marquee free agent quarterback Mike Reilly to the highest ever CFL contract in early 2019 (4 years, $2.9 million CND total), Hervey had, contrary to league rules, signed a separate document outside of the contract, guaranteeing $250,000 of Reilly's yearly salary. However this separate document was never submitted to the league. With the cancelled 2020 season, Reilly had not received the guaranteed payment and filed a grievance in October, prior to Hervey's resignation. Neither BC Lions team president Rick Lelacheur nor owner David Braley (who died in between Hervey's resignation and the TSN report) were aware of Hervey's guarantee to Reilly until the grievance .

=== Hamilton Tiger-Cats ===
After a year away from the CFL, Hervey was named the assistant general manager and senior advisor to the president of football operations for the Hamilton Tiger-Cats on December 24, 2021. He spent two years in that capacity before being promoted to general manager on December 5, 2023.

=== Edmonton Elks ===
On November 9, 2024, it was announced that Hervey had been named the vice president of football operations and general manager for the Edmonton Elks. Hervey kicked off his latest GM tenure with controversy, going on what was described as a "rant" about his refusal to discuss the possibility of extending receiver Geno Lewis, including that he had not yet spoken with Lewis or his agent. Hervey doubled down and stated that there were no superstar players in the CFL; he was heavily criticized for this by the CFLPA, as well as from former players and media figures, such as Glen Suitor and Darian Durant who called Hervey's statement "distasteful".

=== CFL GM record ===
Team	Year	Regular season					Postseason		
Team	Year	Won	Lost	Ties	Win %	Finish	Won	Lost	Result
EDM	2013	4	14	0	.222	4th in West Division	-	-	Failed to Qualify
EDM	2014	12	6	0	.666	2nd in West Division	1	1	Lost in West Final
EDM	2015	14	4	0	.777	1st in West Division	2	0	Won 103rd Grey Cup
EDM	2016	10	8	0	.555	3rd in West Division	1	1	Lost in East Final
BC	2018	9	9	0	.500	4th in West Division	0	1	Lost in East Semi Final
BC	2019	5	13	0	.278	5th in West Division	-	-	Failed to Qualify
HAM	2024	7	11	0	.389	4th in East Division	-	-	Failed to Qualify
EDM	2025	7	11	0	.389	5th in West Division	–	–	Failed to qualify
EDM	2026	13	5	0	.722	1st in West Division	2	0	Won 113th Grey Cup
Total		81	81	0	.500	2 Division Championships	6	3	2 Grey Cups
