= Andrew Peirson =

Canadian gridiron football player (born 1994)

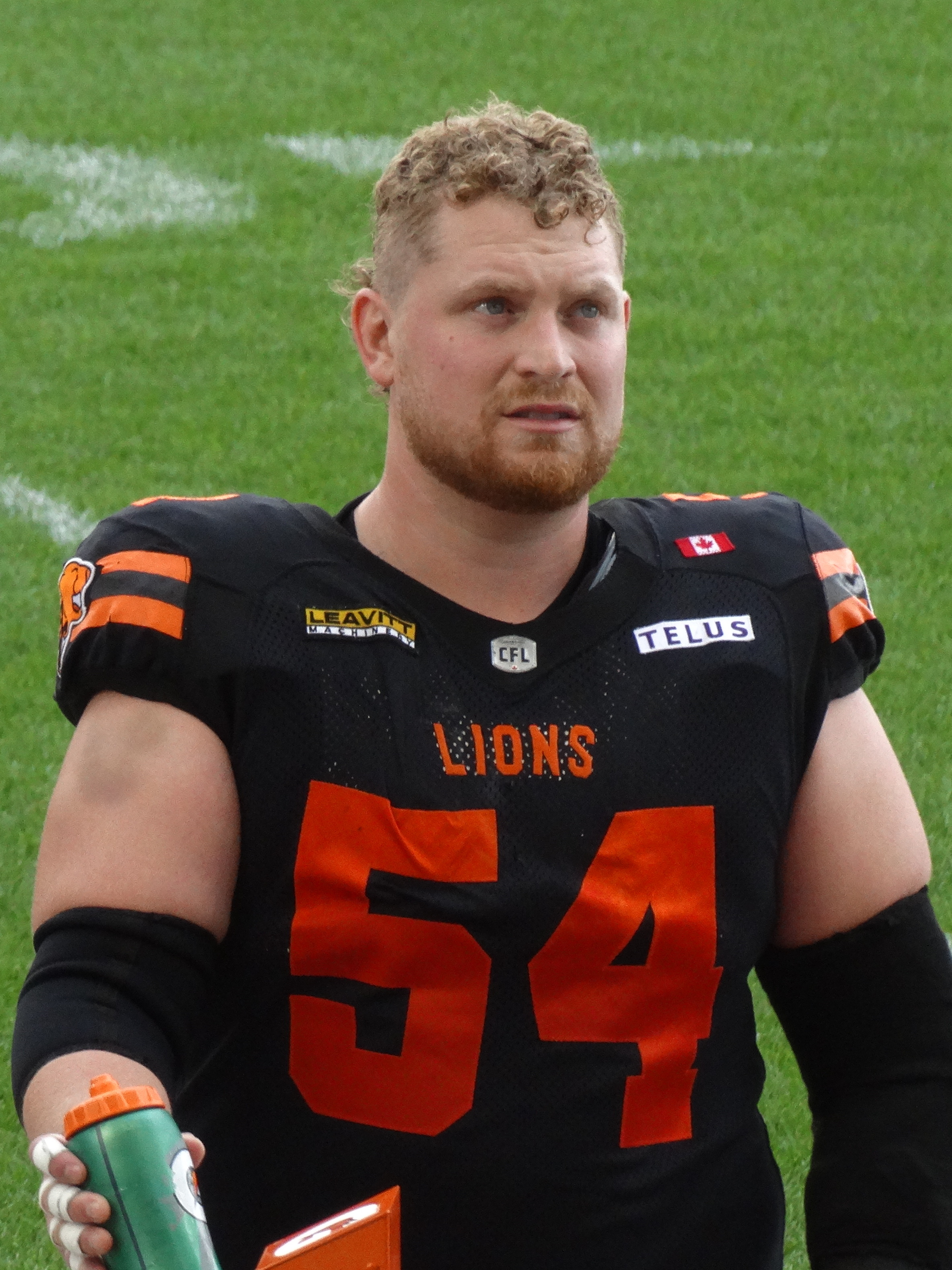
- Peirson with the BC Lions in 2025

No. 54 – BC Lions
- Position: Offensive lineman
- Roster status: Active
- CFL status: National

Personal information
- Born: December 5, 1994 (age 31); Kingston, Ontario, Canada
- Listed height: 6 ft 3 in (1.91 m)
- Listed weight: 300 lb (136 kg)

Career information
- High school: Holy Cross Catholic
- College: Gannon
- CFL draft: 2018: undrafted

Career history
- 2018–present: BC Lions

Awards and highlights
- Tom Pate Memorial Award (2025)
- Stats at CFL.ca

Andrew Peirson (born December 5, 1994) is a Canadian professional football offensive lineman for the BC Lions of the Canadian Football League (CFL).

== College career ==
After using a redshirt season in 2013, Peirson played college football for the Gannon Golden Knights from 2014 to 2017. He played in 29 games over four years, including nine starts in his junior year.

== Professional career ==
Peirson was eligible for the 2018 CFL draft, but was not selected. Instead, he signed as an undrafted free agent with the BC Lions on May 9, 2018. Following an impressive training camp, he was signed to the team's practice roster to begin the 2018 season. Following injuries to the Lions' offensive line, Peirson made his regular season debut on October 6, 2018, against the Toronto Argonauts where he started at centre. He played and started in the last five games of the regular season in 2018. He also made his post-season debut that year as he started at centre in the team's East Semi-Final loss to the Hamilton Tiger-Cats.

In 2019, he began the season on the practice roster and played in just one regular season game that year. He did not play in 2020 due to the cancellation of the 2020 CFL season.

Following the Lions' training camp in 2021, Peirson made the team's active roster as a backup offensive lineman. He dressed in all 14 regular season games as a backup in the pandemic-shortened 2021 season. In 2022, he again made the team's active roster as a backup, but started at centre for two games in September following an injury to Sukh Chungh. On February 2, 2026, Peirson re-signed with the Lions, on a one-year contract extension. On June 12, 2026, Peirson was placed on the Lions' 6-game injured list to start the 2026 CFL season. He rejoined the active roster on July 30, 2026. On August 4, 2026, Peirson was assigned to the Lions' practice roster. He was recalled to the active roster on August 7, 2026.

== Personal life ==
Peirson was born to parents Daniela and Stephen Peirson and has one sister and one brother.
