= Dominique Termansen =

Canadian football player (born 1994)

No. 43
- Position: Defensive back

Personal information
- Born: April 2, 1994 (age 32); North Vancouver, British Columbia, Canada
- Listed height: 5 ft 11 in (1.80 m)
- Listed weight: 188 lb (85 kg)

Career information
- High school: Carson Graham
- University: British Columbia
- CFL draft: 2016: undrafted

Career history
- 2016–2017: Montreal Alouettes
- 2018–2019: BC Lions
- 2019–2021: Montreal Alouettes

Awards and highlights
- Vanier Cup champion (2015)
- Stats at CFL.ca

Dominique Termansen (born April 2, 1994) is a Canadian former professional football defensive back who played in the Canadian Football League (CFL). He played CIS football with the UBC Thunderbirds where he was a member of the 51st Vanier Cup championship team.

== Professional career ==
=== Montreal Alouettes (first stint) ===
Termansen was not selected in the 2016 CFL draft, but signed as an undrafted free agent by the Alouettes on May 19, 2016 to a two-year contract. After initially beginning the 2016 season on the practice roster, he was quickly elevated to the active roster and played in his first professional game on June 24, 2016 against the Winnipeg Blue Bombers. He played in all 18 regular season games during his rookie year, recording one defensive tackle, four special teams tackles, one interception, and one forced fumble. In 2017, he spent time on the injured list and practice roster and played in nine regular season games while posting three defensive tackles and one special teams tackle.

=== BC Lions ===
Upon becoming a free agent, Termansen signed with his hometown BC Lions on February 13, 2018. He spent much of the 2018 season on the injured reserve and practice roster and played in only four regular season games and one playoff game that year. In 2019, he played in the Lions' first two regular season games, before being placed on the injured list, then the practice roster, and then released altogether on July 16, 2019.

=== Montreal Alouettes (second stint) ===
On September 2, 2019, it was announced that Termansen had re-signed with the Alouettes. He played in the Alouettes' last nine regular season games and the subsequent post-season game, recording six defensive tackles and one special teams tackle. Following the end of the 2019 season, Termansen signed a one-year contract extension with the Alouettes. He re-signed with the Alouettes again on January 20, 2021. He was placed on the reserve/suspended list on September 11, 2021.
