= Bryan Burnham =

American gridiron football player (born 1990)

No. 16
- Position: Wide receiver

Personal information
- Born: April 3, 1990 (age 36); Moorestown, New Jersey, U.S.
- Listed height: 6 ft 2 in (1.88 m)
- Listed weight: 210 lb (95 kg)

Career information
- High school: Moorestown (New Jersey)
- College: Tulsa
- NFL draft: 2013: undrafted

Career history
- BC Lions (2014–2022)

Awards and highlights
- 3× CFL All-Star (2017, 2019, 2021); 5× CFL West All-Star (2016–2019, 2021)

Bryan Burnham (born April 3, 1990) is an American former professional football wide receiver who played nine seasons for the BC Lions of the Canadian Football League (CFL) from 2014 to 2022. Burnham played college football at the University of Tulsa. He signed as an undrafted free agent with the BC Lions in 2014. He is from Moorestown, New Jersey.

== College career ==
Burnham played college football for the Tulsa Golden Hurricane, the only NCAA Division I school that recruited him. After he developed a serious infection when he cut his arm in practice, he sat out his freshman year with redshirt status in 2008. He played as a defensive back in 2009 and 2010 before switching to the wide receiver position for his junior year. In his first year at that position, Burnham caught 54 receptions for 850 yards and a team-best nine touchdowns. Burnham was injured in the third quarter of the first game of the 2012 season against Iowa State. He suffered a torn ACL injury which ended his final year of NCAA eligibility. Tulsa sought a waiver from the NCAA to allow Burnham to compete in his sixth-year given the early timing of his injury, but this request and its appeal were declined.

== Professional career ==
Burnham was signed as a free agent by BC Lions in May 2014 for the upcoming season. Initially playing on the practice squad, he made his pro debut in Week 13 against the Toronto Argonauts, in which he caught five passes for 90 yards and a touchdown. His season was cut short one week later when he suffered a lacerated spleen. In his second season in the CFL Burnham played in 11 games catching 35 passes 423 yards with 2 touchdowns. Burnham had a breakout season in 2016, playing in all 18 games for the first time in his career he set personal bests in catches, yards and touchdowns. His 1,392 receiving yards was fourth highest in the league that year. Burnham was set to become a free agent in February 2017. On December 6, 2016, Burnham had a workout with the Minnesota Vikings, and a workout with the New York Jets on December 15, 2016. According to BC Lions head coach Wally Buono, Burnham had workouts with somewhere between 10 and 12 NFL teams between the end of the 2016 season and January 31, 2017, at which time pending CFL free agents were no longer allowed to work out with NFL teams until their contracts expired on February 14, 2017. On February 10, 2017, Burnham and the Lions agreed to a two-year contract extension. Over the following two seasons Burnham continued to be a key part of the Lions passing attack, catching over 148 passes for 2,231 yards with 16 touchdowns. Identically to two years prior, on February 10, 2019, Burnham and the Lions agreed to a two-year contract extension. He had a career-high 100 receptions for 1,492 receiving yards and 11 touchdowns en route to being named a CFL All-Star. Following the cancellation of the 2020 season Burnham and the Lions agreed to a new contract extension on February 1, 2021. Burnham was once again named a CFL All-Star following the 2021 season, posting 67 receptions for 965 yards and five touchdowns. Burnham suffered a punctured lung and broken ribs on June 25, 2022, and it was announced he would miss the next 3–6 games. Later in the 2022 season he suffered a fractured wrist. He was placed on the six-game injured reserve list on September 26, 2022. Burnham ended up missing half the season with injuries and caught only 41 passes, his lowest total since his second season in the league (2015) in which he caught 35 passes.

On December 6, 2022, Burnham retired from professional football after nine seasons with the Lions.

=== Season statistics ===
Receiving		Regular season							Playoffs
Year	Team	Games	Rec	Att	Yards	Avg	Long	TD	Games	No.	Yards	Avg	Long	TD
2014	BC	2	6	12	113	18.8	35	1	Did not participate due to injury
2015	BC	11	35	53	423	12.1	47	2	1	1	24	24	24	0
2016	BC	18	79	106	1,392	17.6	55	6	2	5	97	19.4	34	1
2017	BC	16	81	125	1,202	14.8	53	7	Team did not qualify
2018	BC	18	67	109	1,029	15.4	55	9	1	3	35	11.7	12	0
2019	BC	17	100	146	1,492	14.9	56	11	Team did not qualify
2020	BC	Season cancelled							Season cancelled
2021	BC	14	67	93	965	14.4	61	5	Team did not qualify
2022	BC	9	41	59	569	14.5	53	4	2	6	87	14.5	26	1
CFL totals		105	476	703	7,212	15.2	61	42	6	15	243	16.2	34	2

== Personal life ==
Burnham's father, Lem Burnham, was a defensive lineman with the Philadelphia Eagles from 1977 to 1979. He also worked as the team psychologist for the Eagles, Philadelphia 76ers and Baltimore Orioles. His brother, Lewis, played college football for the North Carolina Tar Heels. He also has two sisters, the eldest Shannon, attended Saint Francis University in Loretto, Pennsylvania on a basketball scholarship, Kara attended Montclair University in New Jersey where she played both basketball and volleyball. Bryan married his wife, Aubrey Burnham, in April 2018. They currently reside in Oklahoma.
