= Aaron Grymes =

American gridiron football player and coach (born 1991)

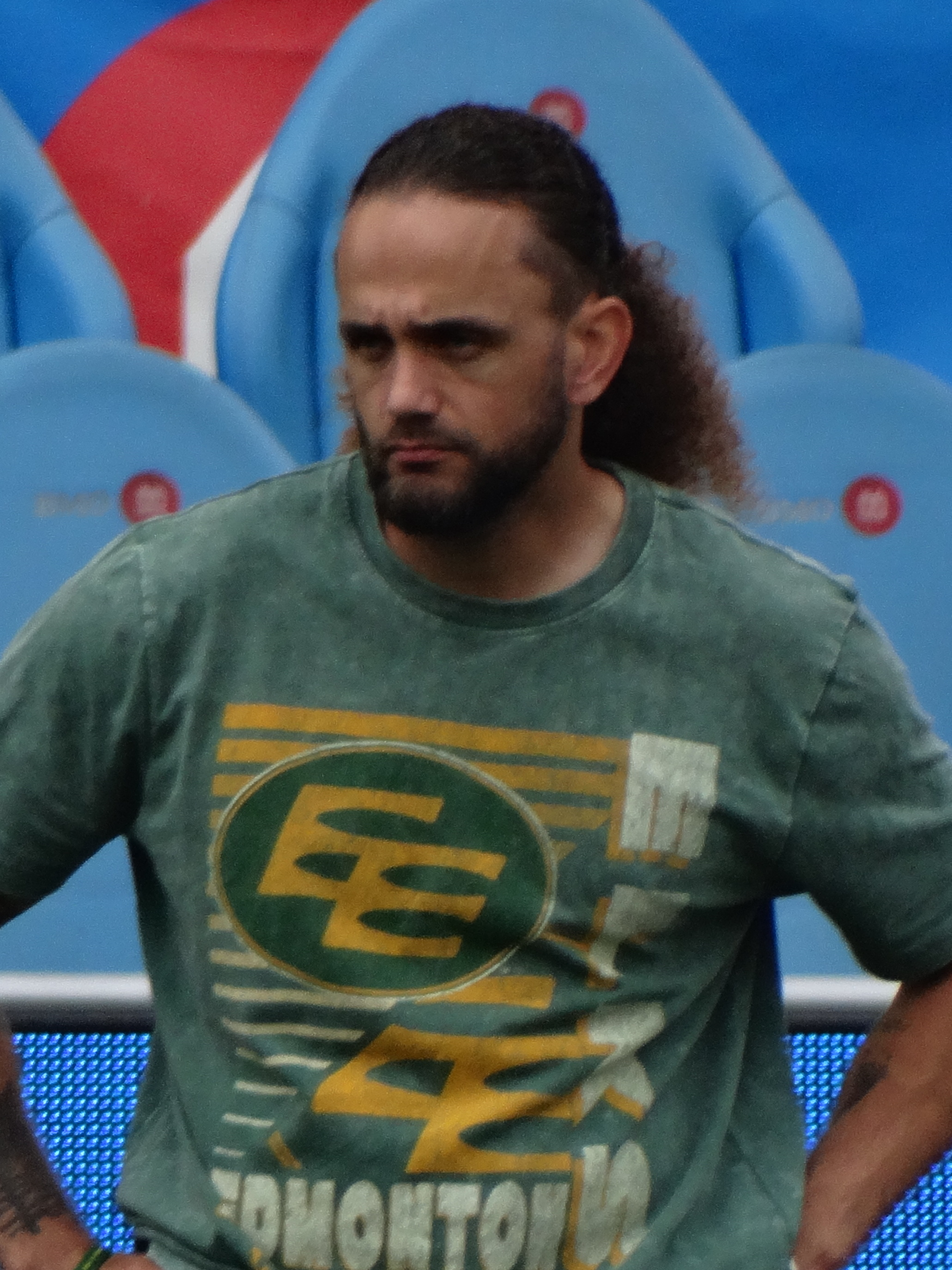
- Grymes with the Edmonton Elks in 2025

Edmonton Elks
- Title: Defensive backs coach

Personal information
- Born: March 1, 1991 (age 35); Seattle, Washington, U.S.
- Listed height: 5 ft 11 in (1.80 m)
- Listed weight: 185 lb (84 kg)

Career information
- Position: Defensive back (No. 36)
- High school: West Seattle (WA)
- College: Idaho
- NFL draft: 2013: undrafted

Career history

Playing
- Edmonton Eskimos (2013–2015); Philadelphia Eagles (2016); Edmonton Eskimos (2017–2018); BC Lions (2019–2020); Edmonton Elks (2021–2023); Winnipeg Blue Bombers (2024)*
- * Offseason or practice squad member only

Coaching
- Edmonton Elks (2024–present) Defensive backs coach

Awards and highlights
- 2× Grey Cup champion (2015, 2026); CFL All-Star (2015); CFL West All-Star (2015)

Career NFL statistics
- Games played: 1
- Stats at Pro Football Reference

Career CFL statistics
- Games played: 95
- Defensive tackles: 294
- Interceptions: 13
- Sacks: 1
- Stats at CFL.ca

Aaron Grymes (born March 1, 1991) is an American former professional football defensive back who is the defensive backs coach for the Edmonton Elks of the Canadian Football League (CFL). He played college football at Idaho. Grymes made his professional debut for the Edmonton Eskimos in 2013 and was also a member of the Philadelphia Eagles of the National Football League (NFL) and BC Lions and Winnipeg Blue Bombers of the CFL.

== College career ==
Grymes played for the Idaho Vandals from 2009 to 2012.

== Professional career ==
Pre-draft measurables
Height	Weight	Arm length	Hand span	Wingspan	40-yard dash	10-yard split	20-yard split	20-yard shuttle	Three-cone drill	Vertical jump	Broad jump	Bench press
5 ft 10 5/8 in (1.79 m)	177 lb (80 kg)	29 7/8 in (0.76 m)	9 3/8 in (0.24 m)	6 ft 1 3/8 in (1.86 m)	4.60 s	1.60 s	2.65 s	4.23 s	6.88 s	40.0 in (1.02 m)	10 ft 4 in (3.15 m)	11 reps
All values from Pro Day

=== Edmonton Eskimos (first stint) ===
Grymes signed with the Edmonton Eskimos on May 29, 2013. He won his first professional championship with the Eskimos in the 103rd Grey Cup victory over Ottawa.

=== Philadelphia Eagles ===
Grymes signed with the Philadelphia Eagles on February 18, 2016. Grymes was released during final roster cuts and was later re-signed to the practice squad on October 24, 2016. He was promoted to the Eagles active roster on November 11, 2016. He was released by the Eagles on November 21 and was re-signed to the practice squad. He signed a reserve/future contract with the Eagles on January 2, 2017. He was waived on September 1, 2017.

=== Edmonton Eskimos (second stint) ===
Following his NFL release, Grymes re-signed with the Eskimos and played in six games to finish the 2017 CFL season. In 2018, he played in 17 games, recording 58 defensive tackles, five special teams tackles, and three interceptions.

=== BC Lions ===
On the first day of 2019 free agency, Grymes signed with the BC Lions for the 2019 season. Grymes played in 16 games for the Lions in 2019, recording 54 defensive tackles and one interception. He missed the final two games of the season after suffering a torn ACL in Week 18. He did not play in 2020 due to the cancellation of the 2020 CFL season and was released by the Lions on February 5, 2021.

=== Edmonton Elks (third stint) ===
Grymes signed a one-year contract with the Edmonton Elks on February 6, 2021. He played in 13 regular season games in 2021 where he had 51 defensive tackles, seven pass knockdowns, and one interception. After suffering a knee injury in a preseason game in 2022, he missed the entire season as well as the 2023 season. He was released by the Elks on January 4, 2024.

=== Winnipeg Blue Bombers ===
On July 23, 2024, it was announced that Grymes had signed a practice roster agreement with the Winnipeg Blue Bombers. He did not play in a game for the team and was released on August 17, 2024.

Grymes signed a one-day contract with the Edmonton Elks on September 6, 2024, in order to retire as a member of the team.

== Coaching career ==
On September 6, 2024, it was announced that Grymes had joined the coaching staff of the Edmonton Elks to serve as a defensive assistant coach. On January 10, 2025, the Edmonton Elks announced that Grymes had been retained and was named the team's defensive backs coach.
