= David Knevel =

Canadian gridiron football player (born 1994)

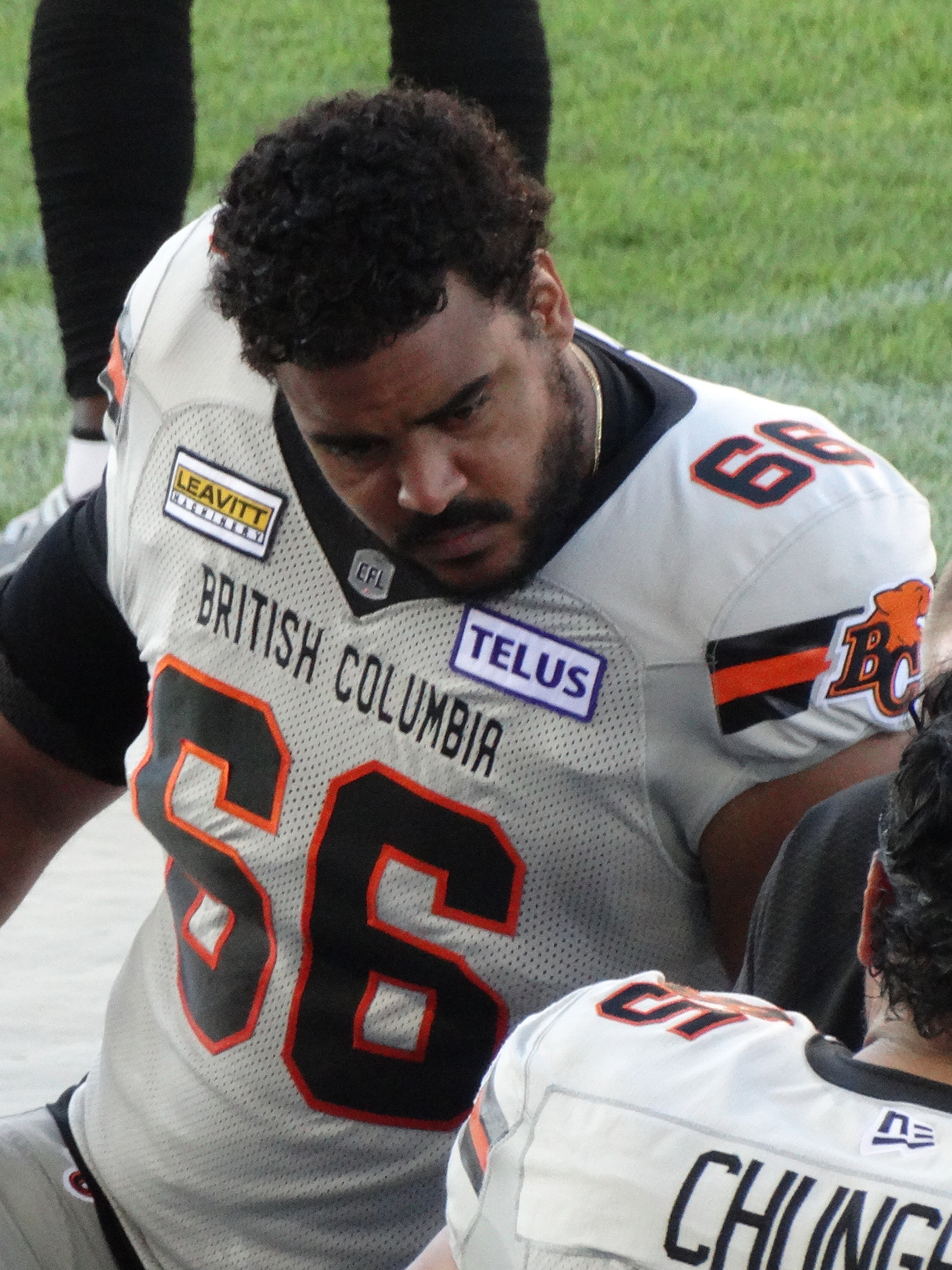
- Knevel with the BC Lions in 2023

Profile
- Position: Offensive lineman

Personal information
- Born: October 18, 1994 (age 32); Brantford, Ontario, Canada
- Listed height: 6 ft 8 in (2.03 m)
- Listed weight: 325 lb (147 kg)

Career information
- High school: Pauline Johnson Collegiate
- College: Nebraska
- CFL draft: 2018: 3rd round, 21st overall pick

Career history
- 2018–2024: BC Lions
- 2025: Ottawa Redblacks
- Stats at CFL.ca

David Knevel (born October 18, 1994) is a Canadian professional football offensive lineman. He most recently played for the Ottawa Redblacks of the Canadian Football League (CFL).

== College career ==
After using a redshirt season in 2013, Knevel played college football for the Nebraska Cornhuskers from 2014 to 2017.

== Professional career ==
=== BC Lions ===
Knevel was selected in the third round and 21st overall by the BC Lions in the 2018 CFL draft and signed with the team on May 19, 2018. He then played in his first career game on July 7, 2018, against the Winnipeg Blue Bombers. In his rookie year, he dressed in 16 regular season games as a back-up offensive lineman.

In his second year, in 2019, Knevel played in three games and made his first career start, at left tackle, in the final game of the season on November 2, 2019, against the Calgary Stampeders. He spent the remainder of the year on the reserve roster and injured list. He did not play in 2020 due to the cancellation of the 2020 CFL season.

As a pending free agent entering the 2021, Knevel re-signed with the Lions on January 28, 2021. He then dressed in all 14 regular season games in a pandemic-shortened season. Following the season, he re-signed with the Lions on December 16, 2021.

On February 3, 2024, the Lions announced that Knevel had signed a one-year contract extension with the team. On February 11, 2025, he left the Lions as a free agent at the expiry of his contract.

=== Ottawa Redblacks ===
On September 2, 2025, it was announced that Knevel had signed with the Ottawa Redblacks. He spent two weeks on the practice roster, but dressed in the final five games of the season. He became a free agent upon the expiry of his contract on February 10, 2026.
