= Brandon Rutley =

American gridiron football player (born 1989)

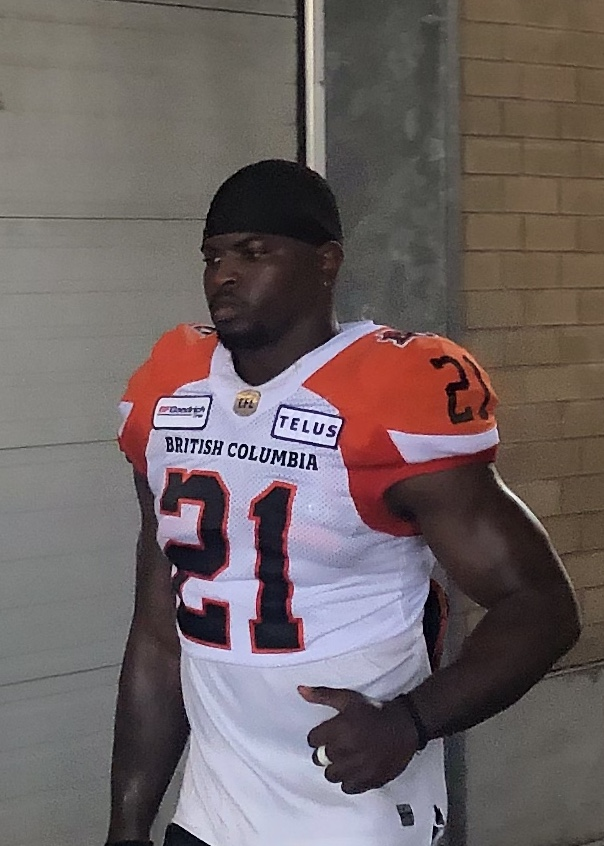
- Rutley before a Lions game in 2019.

No. 21
- Position: Running back

Personal information
- Born: April 9, 1989 (age 37); Tuscaloosa, Alabama, U.S.
- Listed height: 5 ft 11 in (1.80 m)
- Listed weight: 192 lb (87 kg)

Career information
- High school: Martinez (CA) Alhambra
- College: San Jose State

Career history
- 2012: Hamilton Tiger-Cats
- 2014–2017: Montreal Alouettes
- 2018–2020: BC Lions

Awards and highlights
- Second-team All-WAC (2011)
- Stats at CFL.ca

Brandon DiAundre Rutley (born April 9, 1989) is an American former professional football running back. He played college football at San Jose State. He was a member of the Hamilton Tiger-Cats, Montreal Alouettes, and BC Lions of the Canadian Football League (CFL).

== Early life ==
Rutley was born in Tuscaloosa, Alabama and later lived in Martinez, California. Rutley graduated from Alhambra High School in 2007. Rutley was an all-league running back on the Alhambra football team and also played on the basketball and track teams.

College recruiting
Name	Hometown	School	Height	Weight	Commit date
Brandon Rutley; RB	Martinez, CA	Alhambra HS	5 ft 11 in (1.80 m)	180 lb (82 kg)	Feb 7, 2007
Brandon Rutley; RB	Recruit ratings: Scout: Rivals: 247Sports: (75)				
Overall recruit ranking: Scout: 105 (RB), 102 (school) Rivals: 116 (school) 247Sports: 109 (RB), 151 (CA), 108 (school)
Note: In many cases, Scout, Rivals, 247Sports, On3, and ESPN may conflict in their listings of height and weight.; In these cases, the average was taken. ESPN grades are on a 100-point scale.; Sources: "2008 San Jose St. Football Commitment List". Rivals. Archived from the original on August 23, 2014.; "2007 San Jose State College Football Recruiting Commits". Scout. Archived from the original on August 23, 2014.; "San Jose State Spartans 2007 Player Commits". ESPN. Archived from the original on August 23, 2014.; "Scout.com Team Recruiting Rankings". Scout.; "2007 Team Ranking". Rivals.com.; "San Jose State 2008 Football Commits". 247Sports. Archived from the original on August 23, 2014.

== College career ==
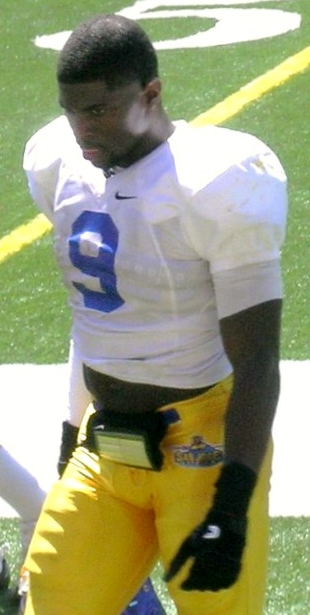
Rutley at San Jose State's 2011 summer scrimmage.

At San Jose State University, Rutley enrolled in the fall 2007 semester but did not play football. He then played on the San Jose State Spartans football team from 2008 to 2011, the first two seasons under Dick Tomey. As a freshman in 2008, Rutley played all 12 games and ran 79 times for 356 yards and 3 touchdowns, with his longest run being a 60-yarder against #13 Boise State.

In 2009, Rutley played 10 games and had just 59 rushing yards and 2 touchdowns. In 2010, San Jose State had a new head coach Mike MacIntyre. Rutley played all 12 games in 2010 and improved with 129 carries for 461 yards and 4 touchdowns. Rutley stood out for his ability to shed tacklers and make long-distance running plays. Rutley also had 17 receptions for 183 yards, including a 75-yard touchdown reception. As a senior in 2011, Rutley earned second-team All-Western Athletic Conference honors. He played 11 games and had 216 rushes for 903 yards and 12 touchdowns. Among his touchdown runs were one of 66 yards against New Mexico State and 65 yards against UCLA. Rutley also made 27 receptions for 336 yards. In San Jose State's homecoming game against Hawaii, Rutley fumbled a 25-yard reception with about 2:30 to go, but San Jose State rallied to beat Hawaii 28-27 in a game where San Jose State had six turnovers and Hawaii five. Rutley graduated from San Jose State in May 2012 with a B.A. in communication studies.

== Professional career ==
Pre-draft measurables
Height	Weight	40-yard dash	10-yard split	20-yard split	Three-cone drill	Vertical jump	Broad jump	Bench press
5 ft 10 in (1.78 m)	200 lb (91 kg)	4.58 s	1.59 s	2.65 s	7.38 s	36 in (0.91 m)	9 ft 9 in (2.97 m)	14 reps
Results were taken at San Jose State's Pro Day.

Rutley attended Oakland Raiders minicamp on a tryout basis after being undrafted in the 2012 NFL draft.

=== Hamilton Tiger-Cats ===
On August 22, 2012, Rutley signed with the Hamilton Tiger-Cats of the Canadian Football League. Rutley had 2 rushing attempts for 17 yards. The Tiger-Cats placed Rutley on injured reserve on September 27, placed Rutley on the non-active list on October 11, and released Rutley on November 2.

=== Montreal Alouettes ===
Rutley signed with the CFL's Montreal Alouettes on June 1, 2014. He had one rush attempt for 6 yards with Montreal. The Alouettes released Rutley on August 11. He was re-signed to the Alouettes' practice roster on September 23, 2014. He was promoted to the active roster on November 15, 2014. On February 3, 2015, the Alouettes and Rutley agreed to a two-year contract extension. Rutley saw increased playing time in the 2015 and 2016 seasons as the team's backup running back, carrying the ball 83 times for 454 yards in 2015, and 113 times for 495 yards in 2016. After almost a week as a free agent Rutley re-signed with the Alouettes, on a two-year contract, on February 20, 2017. Rutley only played in five games for the Alouettes in 2017, rushing for 291 yards on 49 carries.

=== BC Lions ===
On January 15, 2018, Rutley was acquired by the BC Lions via trade. He announced his retirement from football on February 26, 2021.

== Career statistics ==
		Rushing						Receiving
Year	Team	GP	Car	Yards	Avg	Long	TD	Rec	Yards	Avg	Long	TD
2012	HAM	5	2	17	8.5	15	0	2	24	12.0	14	1
2014	MTL	1	1	6	6.0	6	0	1	7	7.0	7	0
2015	MTL	12	83	454	5.5	50	0	20	286	14.3	65	2
2016	MTL	12	113	495	4.4	23	4	35	305	8.7	38	2
2017	MTL	5	49	291	5.9	26	0	17	100	5.9	15	0
2018	BC	1	17	91	5.4	17	1	1	4	4.0	4	0
2019	BC	11	61	341	5.6	36	0	9	76	8.4	16	0
CFL totals		47	326	1,695	5.2	50	5	85	802	9.4	65	5
