= Isaiah Guzylak-Messam =

Canadian gridiron football player (born 1995)

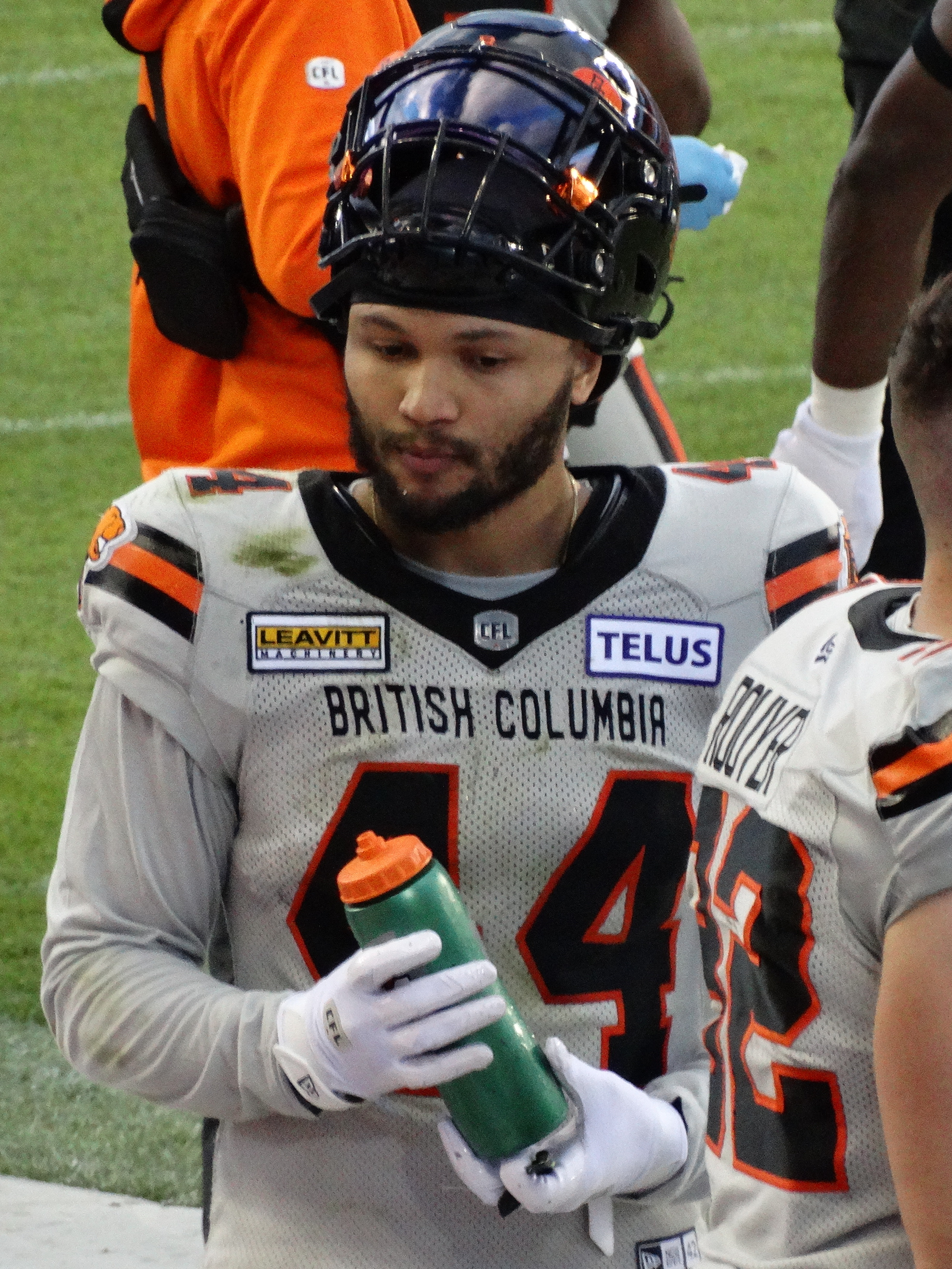
- Guzylak-Messam with the BC Lions in 2024

Profile
- Position: Defensive back

Personal information
- Born: March 10, 1995 (age 31); Hamilton, Ontario, Canada
- Listed height: 6 ft 1 in (1.85 m)
- Listed weight: 220 lb (100 kg)

Career information
- University: Wilfrid Laurier
- CFL draft: 2018: 4th round, 34th overall pick

Career history
- 2018–2025: BC Lions
- Stats at CFL.ca

Isaiah Guzylak-Messam (born March 10, 1995) is a Canadian professional football defensive back who is currently a free agent.

== University career ==
Guzylak-Messam played U Sports football with the Wilfrid Laurier Golden Hawks from 2014 to 2017. He played in 24 games where he had 82 total tackles and two interceptions.

== Professional career ==
Pre-draft measurables
Height	Weight	40-yard dash	20-yard shuttle	Three-cone drill	Vertical jump	Broad jump	Bench press
6 ft 1 1/2 in (1.87 m)	207 lb (94 kg)	4.60 s	4.50 s	7.52 s	30.5 in (0.77 m)	9 ft 3 3/4 in (2.84 m)	14 reps
All values from CFL Combine

=== BC Lions ===
Guzylak-Messam was drafted in the fourth round, 34th overall, in the 2018 CFL draft by the BC Lions. He signed with the team on May 14, 2018, and initially began the season on the practice roster before making his professional debut on August 25, 2018. He played in ten regular season games in his rookie year where he had eight special teams tackles. In 2019, he became a starting linebacker midway through the year where he played in all 18 regular season games and made 11 starts where he had 37 defensive tackles, 14 special teams tackles, and one sack.

Guzylak-Messam did not play in 2020 due to the cancellation of the 2020 CFL season. He then signed a contract extension with the Lions on February 1, 2021. He returned to a reserve role in 2021 where he played in 12 out of 14 regular season games and had two special teams tackles.

In 2022, Guzylak-Messam played in 17 regular season games where he had 16 special teams tackles. In the following season, he played in 11 regular season games and had one defensive tackle and seven special teams tackles.

On August 6, 2025, Guzylak-Messam was placed on the Lions' 6-game injured list approximately midway through the 2025 CFL season, where he spent the remainder of the regular season, before rejoining the active roster on November 7, 2025, in advance of the West Final.

On January 19, 2026, Guzylak-Messam re-signed with the Lions, on a one-year contract extension. On April 30, 2026, Guzylak-Messam was released by the Lions.
