= Mario Villamizar =

Canadian gridiron football player (born 1995)

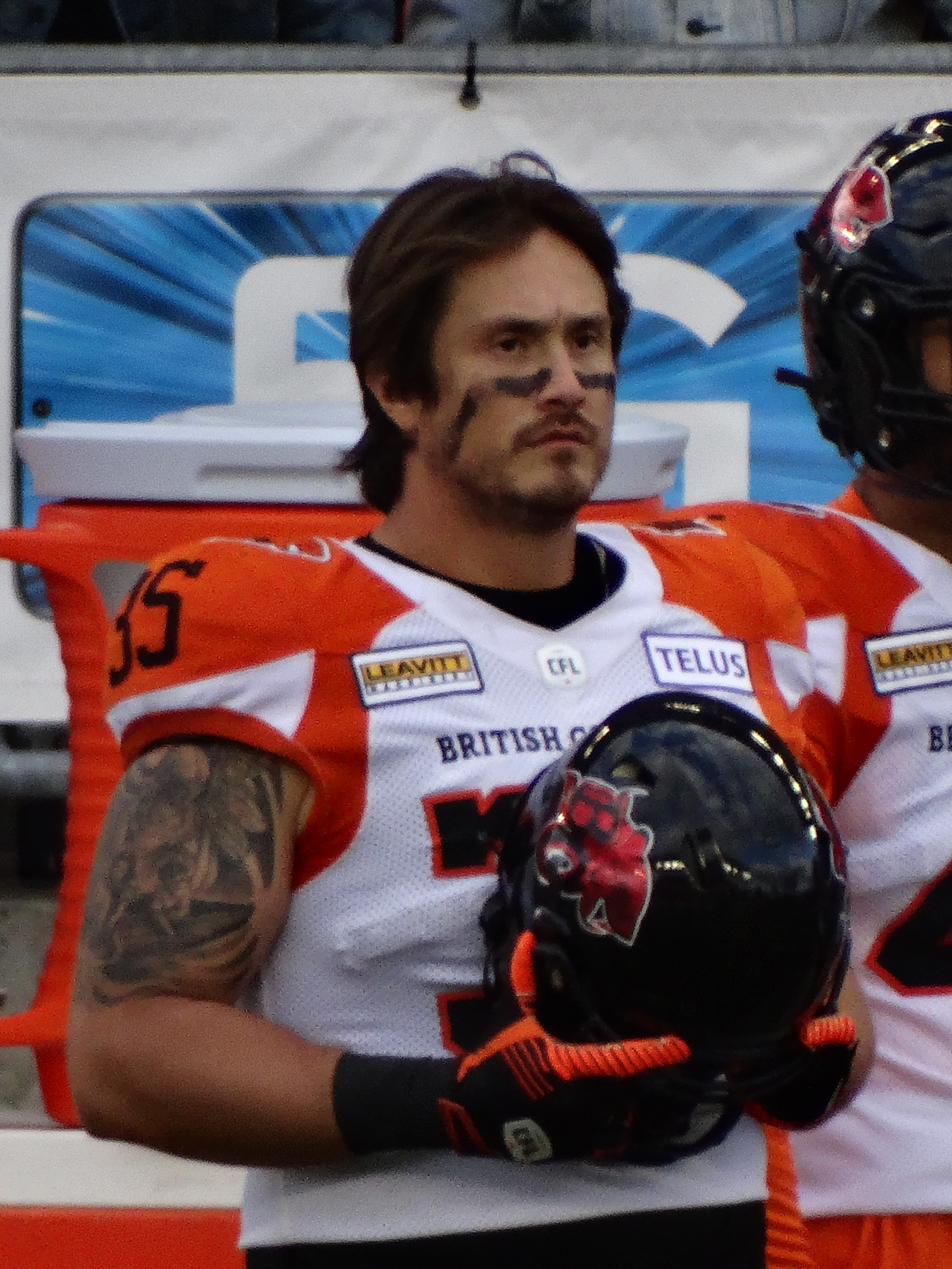
- Villamizar with the BC Lions in 2022

No. 35
- Position: Fullback

Personal information
- Born: March 3, 1995 (age 31); St. Catharines, Ontario, Canada
- Listed height: 6 ft 3 in (1.91 m)
- Listed weight: 237 lb (108 kg)

Career information
- High school: Holy Cross Catholic
- University: Wilfrid Laurier
- CFL draft: 2019: 6th round, 51st overall pick

Career history
- 2019–2022: BC Lions
- 2023: Toronto Argonauts*
- 2023: Edmonton Elks
- * Offseason or practice squad member only

Awards and highlights
- Yates Cup champion (2016)
- Stats at CFL.ca

Mario Villamizar (born March 3, 1995) is a Canadian professional football fullback who played for the BC Lions and Edmonton Elks of the Canadian Football League (CFL).

== University career ==
After using a redshirt season in 2014, Villamizar played U Sports football for the Wilfrid Laurier Golden Hawks from 2015 to 2018. He was part of the 2016 Yates Cup championship team and played in 31 regular season games and seven playoff games over four seasons. In his career, he had 16 receptions for 191 yards and five touchdowns and was named an OUA second-team all-star in 2018.

== Professional career ==
=== BC Lions ===
Villamizar was drafted 51st overall, in the sixth round, by the BC Lions in the 2019 CFL draft and signed with the team on May 16, 2019. He made the team's active roster following 2019 training camp and played in his first professional game on June 15, 2019, against the Winnipeg Blue Bombers. He made his first career reception late in the season on October 5, 2022, against the Toronto Argonauts, and finished the year having played in all 18 regular season games with two catches for 13 yards.

Villamizar did not play in 2020 due to the cancellation of the 2020 CFL season. During off-season workouts in preparation for the 2021 season, he suffered an Achilles injury and began the year on the retired list. He re-signed with the team on October 8, 2021, and played in the team's final five games of the season.

On December 14, 2021, it was announced that Villamizar had signed a contract extension with the Lions. He again made the team's active roster following training camp in 2022. He played in 17 regular season games where he had one kickoff return for seven yards. Villamizar became a free agent upon the expiry of his contract on February 14, 2023.

=== Toronto Argonauts ===
On the first day of free agency, on February 14, 2023, it was announced that Villamizar had signed with the Toronto Argonauts. However, he was part of the final cuts and was released on June 2, 2023.

=== Edmonton Elks ===
Villamizar was added to the Edmonton Elks practice roster on June 26, 2023. He was promoted to the active roster on June 28, placed on injured reserve on July 28, and released on August 6, 2023.
