= Benjamin Plu =

French-born American football player (born 1994)

No. 12 – Fehérvár Enthroners
- Position: Wide receiver
- Roster status: active

Personal information
- Born: July 26, 1994 (age 32); Le Mans, France
- Listed height: 6 ft 2 in (1.88 m)
- Listed weight: 200 lb (91 kg)

Career information
- College: McGill (2016)
- CFL draft: 2019 Euro: 1st round, 7th overall pick

Career history
- Thonon Black Panthers (2017–2019); BC Lions (2019–2021); Seinäjoki Crocodiles (2021); Barcelona Dragons (2022); Fehérvár Enthroners (2023–present)

Awards and highlights
- French League champion (2019); French League championship MVP (2019)
- Stats at CFL.ca

Benjamin Plu (born July 26, 1994) is a wide receiver for the Fehérvár Enthroners in the European League of Football. He was born in Le Mans, France and was drafted as in the first round of the 2019 CFL European Draft by the BC Lions. He played College football for the McGill Redbirds football program.

== Early life ==
Plu began playing football in his hometown for the Caïmans 72 du Mans and was selected for the French junior national team.

== College career ==
Plu attended Le Mans University first before transferring to McGill University, where he recorded 75 receiving yards and one touchdown in six games played.

== Professional career ==
Pre-draft measurables
Height	Weight	40-yard dash	20-yard shuttle	Three-cone drill	Vertical jump	Broad jump	Bench press
6 ft 2 1/2 in (1.89 m)	185 lb (84 kg)	4.89 s	4.31 s	7.15 s	29.5 in (0.75 m)	9 ft 3 7/8 in (2.84 m)	7 reps
All values from CFL Combine

=== Thonon Black Panthers ===
PPlu began his professional career in France with the Thonon Black Panthers, leading them to a league title and earning the championship game MVP in 2019.

=== BC Lions ===
In the 2019 CFL European Draft the BC Lions selected him in the only round with the 7th overall pick. He spent the entire 2019 season on the active roster, but didn't play in the 2020 CFL season due to the cancelled season. His contract was extended for the 2021 season but he was subsequently released in the preseason.

=== Seinäjoki Crocodiles ===
Plu signed with the Seinäjoki Crocodiles of the Finnish Vaahteraliiga in 2021. In seven games, he recorded 19 receptions for 296 yards and three touchdowns.

=== Barcelona Dragons ===
On December 17, 2021, Plu signed with the Barcelona Dragons.

=== Fehérvár Enthroners ===
On 3 December 2022, Plu signed with the Fehérvár Enthroners for the upcoming season in 2023.
