= Jevon Cottoy =

Canadian gridiron football player (born 1996)

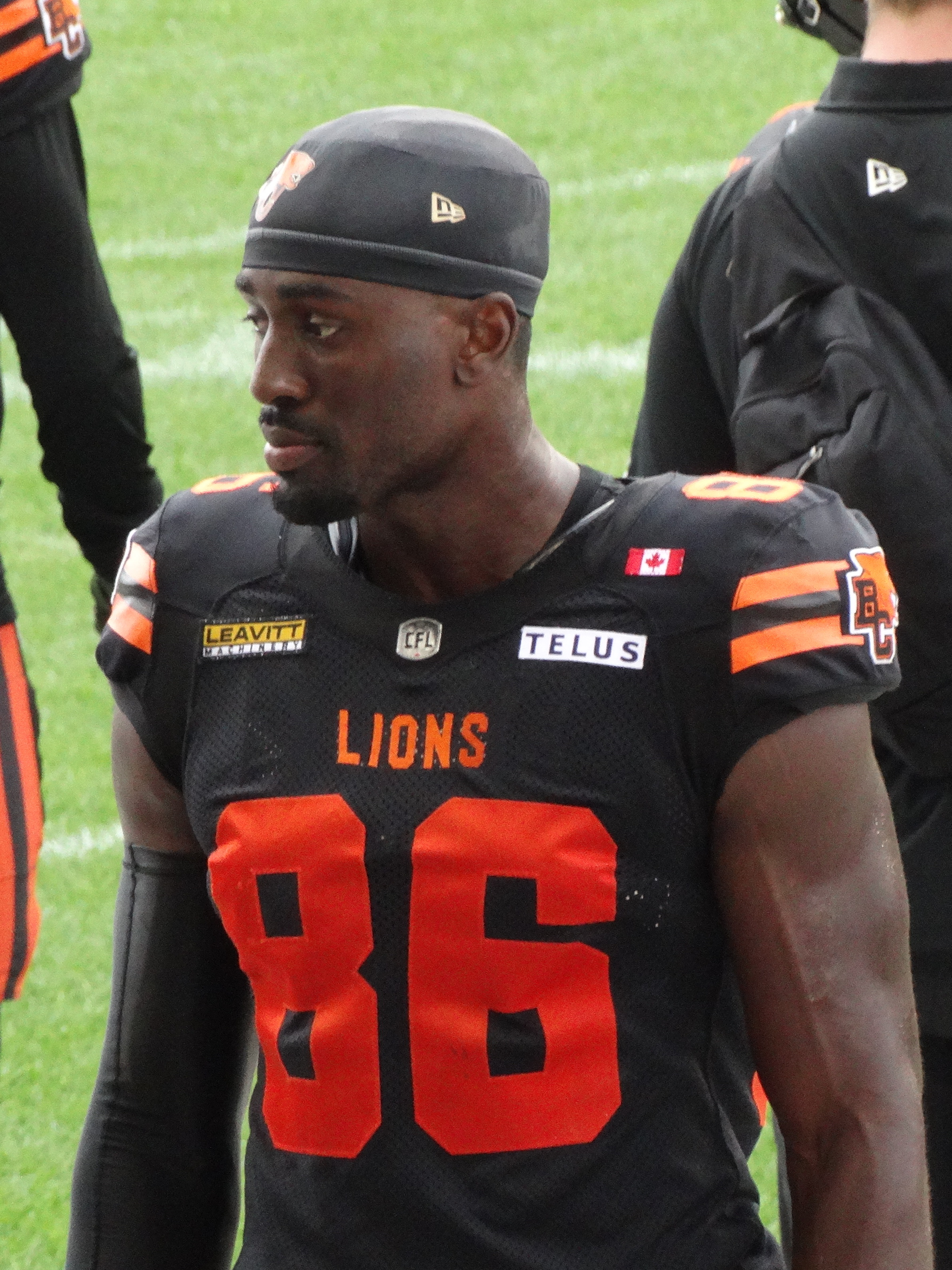
- Cottoy with the BC Lions in 2025

No. 86 – BC Lions
- Position: Wide receiver
- Roster status: Active
- CFL status: National

Personal information
- Born: November 21, 1996 (age 29); Saint Vincent and the Grenadines
- Listed height: 6 ft 5 in (1.96 m)
- Listed weight: 245 lb (111 kg)

Career information
- High school: Forest Lawn (Calgary, Alberta, Canada)
- CJFL: Calgary Colts (2014-2015); Langley Rams (2018)
- CFL draft: 2018

Career history
- 2018–present: BC Lions

Career CFL statistics as of 2026
- Games played: 105
- Receptions: 327
- Receiving yards: 4,108
- Touchdowns: 21
- Stats at CFL.ca

Jevon Cottoy (born November 21, 1996) is a Canadian professional football wide receiver for the BC Lions of the Canadian Football League (CFL). He played junior football for the Calgary Colts and Langley Rams.

== Early life ==
Cottoy was born in Saint Vincent and the Grenadines to parents Valerie and Elroy and has a younger sister, Brianna. He moved to Calgary when he was nine years old to live with his father who was working and living there. After playing soccer and cricket in his youth, Cottoy began playing football when he was 13 years old.

== Junior career ==
Cottoy played for the Calgary Colts of the Canadian Junior Football League in 2014 and 2015 where he was named the 2014 Prairie Football Conference's Rookie of the Year. He was offered a scholarship to play for the Calgary Dinos football team for the 2016 season, but he tore his ACL and MCL just before the season and was unable to play.

Cottoy didn't play football for two years and was training in Calgary to become a firefighter. After discussions with friends and family, he reunited with his former coach, Matt Blokker, to play for the Langley Rams in 2018. He played in eight games in the 2018 regular season and finished with 39 catches for 657 yards and eight touchdowns. In the playoffs that year, the Rams played in four games, including the championship game, where Cottoy had 25 receptions for 645 yards and eight touchdowns.

== Professional career ==
=== BC Lions ===
After a dominant junior career, Cottoy signed with the BC Lions on December 12, 2018, as a territorial protected junior player. Following a strong training camp, he made the team's active roster and played in his first game on June 15, 2019 against the Winnipeg Blue Bombers where he recorded one reception for six yards. He scored his first touchdown on a three-yard reception from Mike Reilly on July 20, 2019, against the Saskatchewan Roughriders. He finished his rookie season having played in 16 regular season games and recorded 38 receptions for 386 yards and one touchdown.

After the CFL canceled the 2020 season due to the COVID-19 pandemic, Cottoy chose to opt-out of his contract with the Lions on August 31, 2020. He had attended a workout with the San Francisco 49ers and New York Jets, but eventually re-signed with the Lions on June 21, 2021. Cottoy remained an important component of the Lions' passing attack over the next two seasons, playing in all 32 regular season games and contributing with 89 receptions for 1,070 yards and six touchdowns.

Following the 2022 season Cottoy had a workout with the Denver Broncos of the National Football League (NFL). However, he was not offered a contract and returned to the Lions for their 2023 season. He played in all 18 regular season games where he had a career-high 57 receptions for 807 yards and four touchdowns.

In 2024, Cottoy missed games due to an ankle injury and played in just 12 regular season games, the fewest of his career, where he had 34 receptions for 401 yards. After sitting out the last four games of the regular season, he returned to play in the West Semi-Final where he had three catches for 82 yards and one touchdown in the loss to the Saskatchewan Roughriders. In the 2025 season, he played in 16 regular season games, missing two to injury, where he had 55 receptions for 681 yards and a career-high six touchdowns.

On June 18, 2026, Cottoy was placed on the Lions' 6-game injured list. He rejoined the active roster on August 7, 2026.
