= DeVone Claybrooks =

American gridiron football player and coach (born 1977)

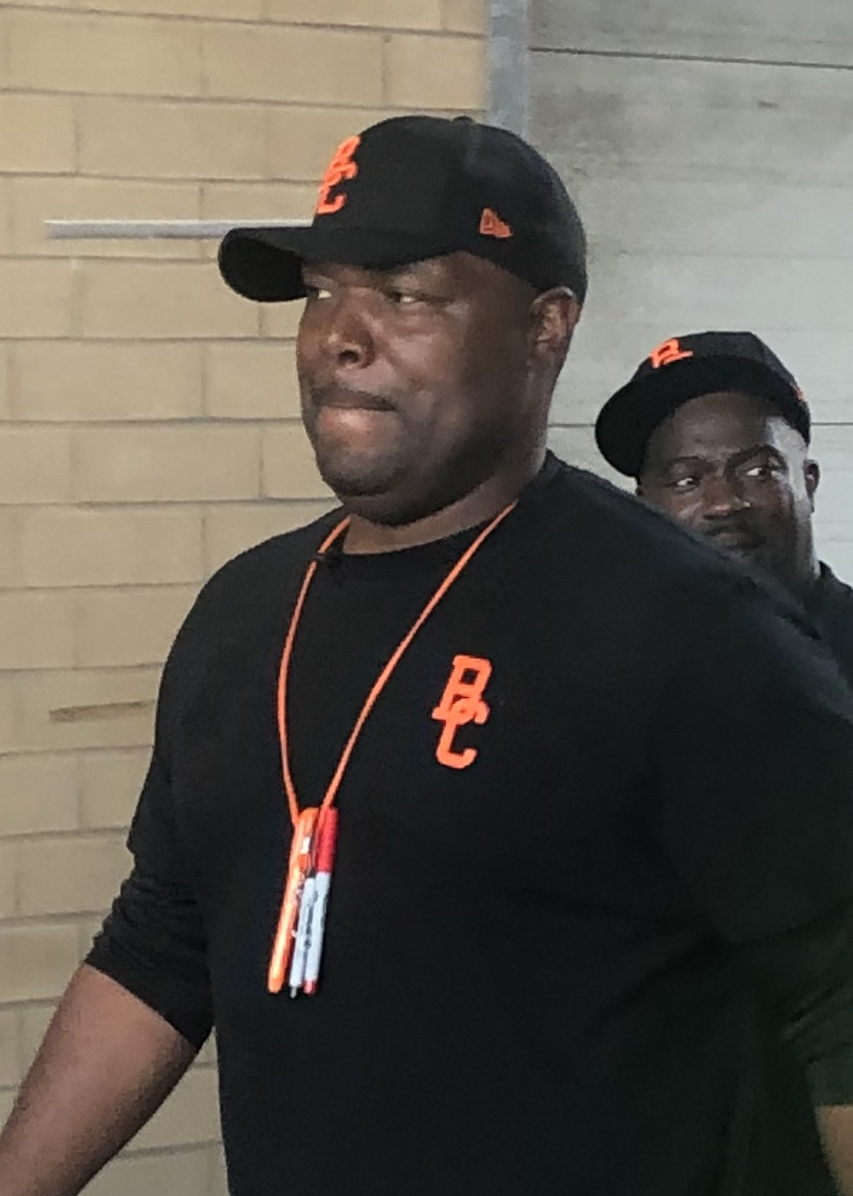
- Claybrooks before a BC Lions game in 2019

No. 93, 92, 95
- Position: Head coach

Personal information
- Born: September 15, 1977 (age 49); Martinsville, Virginia, U.S.
- Listed height: 6 ft 3 in (1.91 m)
- Listed weight: 300 lb (136 kg)

Career information
- College: East Carolina

Career history

Playing
- 2001: Green Bay Packers*
- 2001: Tampa Bay Buccaneers*
- 2001: Cleveland Browns
- 2002: Rhein Fire
- 2002: Tampa Bay Buccaneers
- 2003: San Francisco 49ers
- 2004: Atlanta Falcons*
- 2004: Tampa Bay Buccaneers*
- 2004: Dallas Cowboys
- 2005: Arizona Cardinals*
- 2007–2008: Montreal Alouettes
- 2009–2011: Calgary Stampeders
- * Offseason or practice squad member only

Coaching
- 2012–2015: Calgary Stampeders (Defensive line coach)
- 2016–2018: Calgary Stampeders (Defensive coordinator)
- 2019: BC Lions (Head coach)

Awards and highlights
- Super Bowl champion (XXXVII); 2× Grey Cup champion (2014, 2018); CFL West All-Star (2010)
- Stats at Pro Football Reference
- Stats at CFL.ca (archive)

Natravis DeVone Claybrooks (born September 15, 1977) is an American former professional football defensive tackle and coach. He played college football at East Carolina. He was a defensive tackle in the National Football League (NFL) for seven teams (Packers, Buccaneers, Browns, 49ers, Falcons, Cowboys, and Cardinals). Claybrooks was also a member of the Montreal Alouettes and Calgary Stampeders of the Canadian Football League (CFL). He was later the head coach of the CFL's BC Lions.

== Early life ==
Claybrooks played high school football at Bassett High School as a running back. He accepted a football scholarship from East Carolina University.

He was converted into a defensive tackle, finishing his career with 41 games (18 starts), 100 tackles (13 for loss), 11 sacks, 5 passes defensed, 3 fumble recoveries and one interception.

== Professional career ==
=== NFL ===
Claybrooks was signed as an undrafted free agent by the Green Bay Packers after the 2001 NFL draft on May 18. He was waived on September 2. He was signed by the Tampa Bay Buccaneers to the practice squad but was released on October 17. On October 31, he was signed by the Cleveland Browns to the practice squad and was promoted to the active roster on November 7.

=== NFL Europe ===
In 2002, he was allocated by the Cleveland Browns to the Rhein Fire of the NFL Europe League. On July 26, he was waived injured by the Browns.

=== NFL (II) ===
On November 6, 2002, he was signed by the Tampa Bay Buccaneers to their practice squad and on November 15 he was promoted to the active roster. He was cut three days later and re-signed to the practice squad. He was promoted to the active roster on November 26, 2002. He was a part of the Super Bowl XXXVII winning team. He was released on August 31, 2003. On October 1, 2003, he was signed as a free agent by the San Francisco 49ers. On December 8, 2003, he was signed by the Atlanta Falcons as a free agent. He was waived on March 9, 2004. On April 27, 2004, he was signed by the Tampa Bay Buccaneers. After having a good camp, he suffered a high ankle sprain in the preseason game against the Miami Dolphins. He was waived injured on August 31. On October 5, 2004, the Dallas Cowboys signed him to the practice squad. On November 3, he was promoted to the active roster, appearing in 8 games as the backup to La'Roi Glover and Leonardo Carson at defensive tackle. He wasn't re-signed after the season. On July 30, 2005, he signed with the Arizona Cardinals. He suffered a knee injury during training camp and was waived injured on August 19.

=== CFL ===
On January 14, 2007, he signed with the Montreal Alouettes of the Canadian Football League. The next year, he made 39 tackles (2 for loss) and 4 quarterback sacks. On August 22, 2009, he signed as a free agent with the Calgary Stampeders, registering 17 tackles (one for loss), 2 passes defensed and one forced fumble. In 2010, he was named to the CFL Western All-Stars team, after playing a key role in his team's run defense, while posting 27 tackles (3 for loss), 4 quarterback sacks and 2 passes defensed. He announced his retirement on January 18, 2012.

== Coaching career ==
=== Calgary Stampeders ===
From 2012 to 2015 he was the defensive line coach for the Calgary Stampeders. In 2015, he was promoted to defensive coordinator by the Calgary Stampeders.

=== BC Lions ===
On December 11, 2018, Claybrooks was announced as the new head coach for the BC Lions. Claybrooks' tenure with the Lions was a rocky one. Despite the team's signings of Mike Reilly and Lemar Durant, The Lions failed to live up to expectations. The team struggled on both sides of the ball and posted a record of 1–10 after 11 games. He failed to record a victory against the other West Division teams. Outside of a 25–23 victory over the playoff-bound Montreal Alouettes, the majority of the team's wins were two wins against both the Toronto Argonauts and the Ottawa Redblacks, who both finished below the Lions in the overall standings. After struggling to gain traction throughout the year and posting a 5–13 record in his rookie season, Claybrooks was relieved of his duties on November 6, 2019.

== CFL coaching record ==
Team	Year	Regular season					Postseason		
Team	Year	Won	Lost	Ties	Win %	Finish	Won	Lost	Result
BC	2019	5	13	0	.278	5th in West Division	–	–	Missed playoffs
Total		5	13	0	.278	0 West Division; Championships	0	0	0 Grey Cups

== Personal life ==
Claybrooks is a restaurant owner. His cousin Shawn Moore was a second-team All-American and played quarterback in the NFL.
