= Peter Godber (Canadian football) =

Canadian gridiron football player (born 1994)

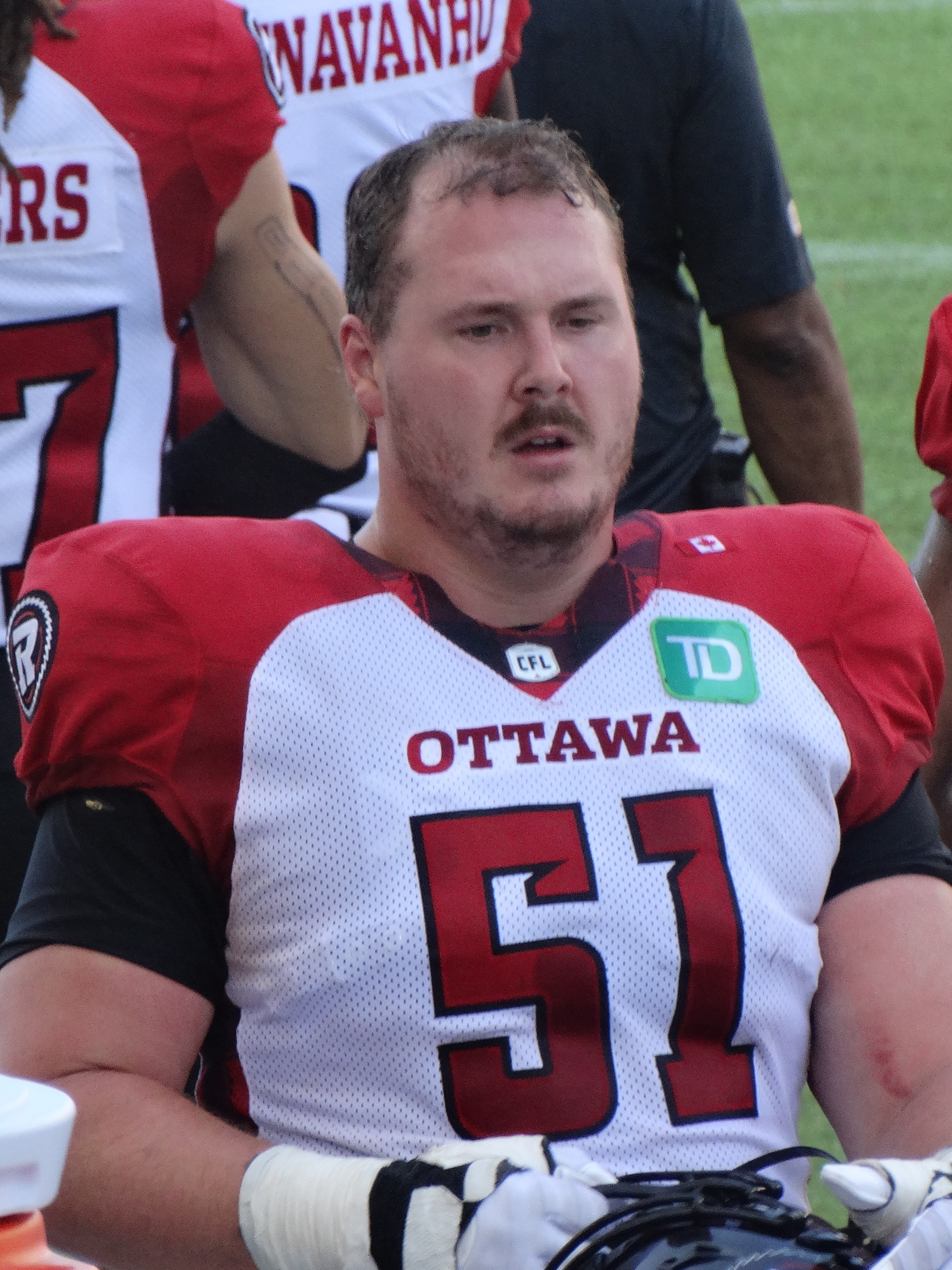
- Godber with the Ottawa Redblacks in 2025

No. 51
- Position: Offensive Lineman

Personal information
- Born: July 17, 1994 (age 32); Toronto, Ontario, Canada
- Listed height: 6 ft 4 in (1.93 m)
- Listed weight: 300 lb (136 kg)

Career information
- High school: St. Andrews (ON)
- College: Rice
- CFL draft: 2018: 1st round, 3rd overall pick

Career history
- 2018–2022: BC Lions
- 2023–2024: Saskatchewan Roughriders
- 2025: Ottawa Redblacks
- Stats at CFL.ca

Peter Clark Godber (born July 17, 1994) is a Canadian former professional football offensive lineman who played in the Canadian Football League (CFL).

== College career ==
Godber played college football for the Rice Owls from 2013 to 2017.

== Professional career ==
Pre-draft measurables
Height	Weight
6 ft 3 1/2 in (1.92 m)	304 lb (138 kg)
All values from CFL Combine

=== BC Lions ===
At the 2018 CFL combine, Godber was asked to leave after declining to participate in events due to illness. Despite this, he was able to work out at Rice's pro day, where his results would have ranked in the short shuttle, three-cone and bench compared to other lineman if it were done at the combine.

On May 3, 2018, Godber was drafted by the BC Lions on May 3, 2018, with the third overall pick of the 2018 CFL draft. Godber officially signed with the Lions on May 20, 2018. He played in nine games in his rookie year in 2018 and made his first start on September 14, 2018, against the Montreal Alouettes. Godber suffered a season-ending leg injury on September 29, 2018, against the Hamilton Tiger-Cats, which led to him missing most of the 2019 season. He did not play in 2020 due to the cancellation of the 2020 CFL season.

In 2021, he started in all 14 regular season games for the team at centre. He became a free agent upon the expiry of his contract on February 14, 2023.

=== Saskatchewan Roughriders ===
On February 14, 2023, it was announced that Godber had signed with the Saskatchewan Roughriders.

=== Ottawa Redblacks ===
On February 11, 2025, it was announced that Godber had signed a two-year contract with the Ottawa Redblacks. He retired on April 30, 2026.

== Personal Life ==
Godber attended St. Andrew's College in Aurora, Ontario from 2010 to 2013 after starting at Northern Secondary School in Toronto. Godber served as the team captain and won MVP in 2013.

Godber keeps his personal life largely private. He has a brother, Clark, a sister, Georgia, and has cited a close relationship with his grandfather, George. He has been in a long-term relationship with Hailey Petrunia. The couple has not officially confirmed having children, though Petrunia's public profile has referenced a "boy".
