= Charles Nwoye =

Nigerian gridiron football player (born 1996)

Profile
- Position: DE

Personal information
- Born: August 10, 1996 (age 30); Lagos, Nigeria
- Listed height: 6 ft 3 in (1.91 m)
- Listed weight: 250 lb (113 kg)

Career information
- High school: Holy Cross Collegiate
- College: UBC

Career history
- 2019–2020: BC Lions

Awards and highlights
- Vanier Cup champion (2015)
- Stats at CFL.ca

Charles Nwoye (born August 10, 1996) is a former professional Canadian football defensive end. He was drafted by the BC Lions 49th overall in the 2019 CFL draft. He signed with the Lions during May 2019 and made his professional debut in a preseason game against the Edmonton Eskimos in the same month.

He played U Sports football with the UBC Thunderbirds from 2015 to 2018, where he was one of the members of the 51st Vanier Cup championship team in 2015.

Nwoye retired from football on June 15, 2021.
