= Darius Allen =

American gridiron football player (born 1992)

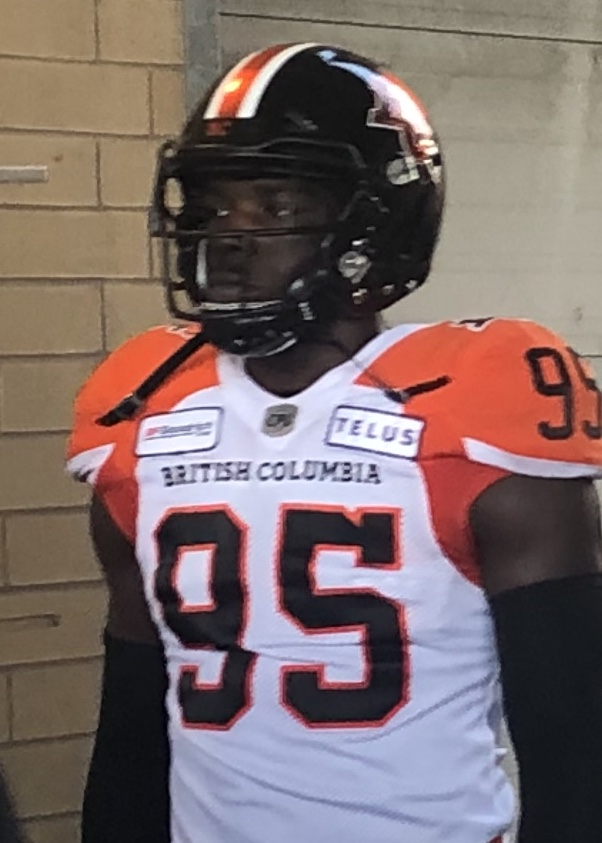
- Allen before a Lions game in 2019

Profile
- Position: Defensive end

Personal information
- Born: April 8, 1992 (age 34); Lexington, Kentucky, U.S.
- Listed height: 6 ft 3 in (1.91 m)
- Listed weight: 240 lb (109 kg)

Career information
- High school: East (Pueblo, Colorado)
- College: CSU Pueblo
- NFL draft: 2015: undrafted

Career history
- Baltimore Ravens (2015)*; BC Lions (2016); Edmonton Eskimos (2017–2018); BC Lions (2019–2020)
- * Offseason or practice squad member only

Career CFL statistics
- Tackles: 15
- Sack: 3
- Stats at CFL.ca

Darius Allen (born April 8, 1992) is an American former professional gridiron football defensive end.

== College career ==
Allen played college football for the CSU Pueblo ThunderWolves from 2011 to 2014. He won the Gene Upshaw Award as the best lineman in Division II in 2013 and 2014.

== Professional career ==
Allen signed with the Baltimore Ravens in May 2015. He was cut by the Ravens on May 12, 2015.

He signed with the BC Lions in February 2016. During the 2016 CFL season, Allen recorded four defensive tackles and a sack.

He signed with the Edmonton Eskimos in August 2017.

Allen signed a contract extension with the BC Lions on January 14, 2021. He was released on June 10, 2021.
