= Grant Kraemer =

American gridiron football player (born 1996)

Profile
- Position: Quarterback

Personal information
- Born: March 4, 1996 (age 30); Northridge, California, U.S.
- Listed height: 6 ft 3 in (1.91 m)
- Listed weight: 225 lb (102 kg)

Career information
- High school: Notre Dame (Sherman Oaks, California)
- College: Drake

Career history
- 2019–2021: BC Lions

Career CFL statistics
- Comp-Att: 1–2
- Yards: 18
- TD–INT: 0–0
- Stats at CFL.ca

Grant Kraemer (born March 4, 1996) is an American former professional football quarterback.

== Early life ==
Kraemer was born in Northridge, California and attended Notre Dame High School in Sherman Oaks, California where his father, Jeff, was an assistant football coach.

== College career ==
Kraemer began his collegiate career at Tufts University before transferring to Glendale Community College after redshirting his freshman season. He completed 64 of 126 passes for 1,010 yards and eight touchdowns before breaking his arm in his only season with the Vaqueros. After the season Kraemer transferred to Drake University.

Kraemer was a three year starter for the Drake Bulldogs. He was named honorable mention All-Pioneer Football League after completing 174 of 289 pass attempts for 2,616 yards and 20 touchdowns. As a senior, Kraemer passed for 2,482 yards and 25 touchdowns. Kraemer finished his Drake career with 7,722 yards and 71 touchdowns.

== Professional career ==
Kraemer was signed by the BC Lions of the Canadian Football League on May 30, 2019. He was signed to the Lions practice roster after performing well in the preseason. Kraemer was signed to the active roster on October 16, 2019. Kraemer made his CFL debut on October 18, 2019 against the Saskatchewan Roughriders, completing one of two pass attempts before suffering a season-ending knee injury when he was hit while throwing his first career completion.
