= Joel Figueroa =

American gridiron football player (born 1989)

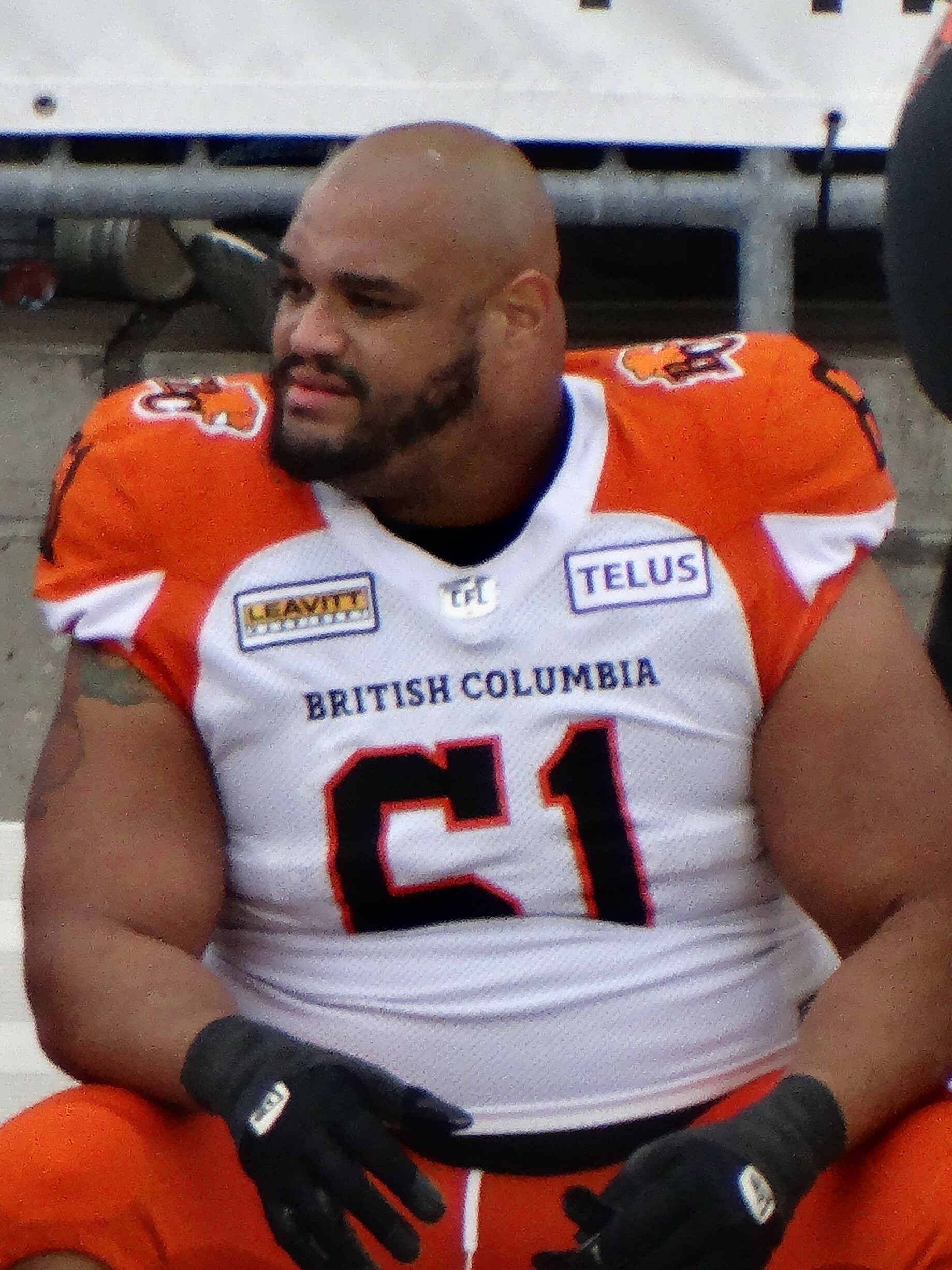
- Figueroa with the BC Lions in 2022

Profile
- Position: Offensive tackle

Personal information
- Born: June 29, 1989 (age 37); Rio Piedras, Puerto Rico
- Listed height: 6 ft 6 in (1.98 m)
- Listed weight: 320 lb (145 kg)

Career information
- High school: North Miami
- College: Miami

Career history
- 2013–2015: Hamilton Tiger-Cats
- 2016–2017: Edmonton Eskimos
- 2018–2022: BC Lions
- 2023–2024: Hamilton Tiger-Cats
- Stats at CFL.ca

Joel Figueroa (born June 29, 1989) is an American professional football offensive tackle.

== College career ==
Figueroa played college football for the Miami Hurricanes.

== Professional career ==
=== Hamilton Tiger-Cats (first stint) ===
Figueroa originally signed with the Hamilton Tiger-Cats as a free agent on April 10, 2013, and spent three years with the team.

=== Edmonton Eskimos ===
Figueroa signed with the Edmonton Eskimos as a free agent in 2016 and also spent the 2017 season with the club.

=== BC Lions ===
Upon entering free agency in 2018, Figueroa signed with the BC Lions. In 2019, he was the BC Lions Most Outstanding Offensive Lineman. He signed a contract extension with the Lions on January 20, 2021. He played in four seasons and 66 games with the Lions and became a free agent upon the expiry of his contract on February 14, 2023.

=== Hamilton Tiger-Cats (second stint) ===
On February 15, 2023, it was announced that Figueroa had signed a two-year contract with the Tiger-Cats.
