= David Mackie (Canadian football) =

Canadian gridiron football player (born 1994)

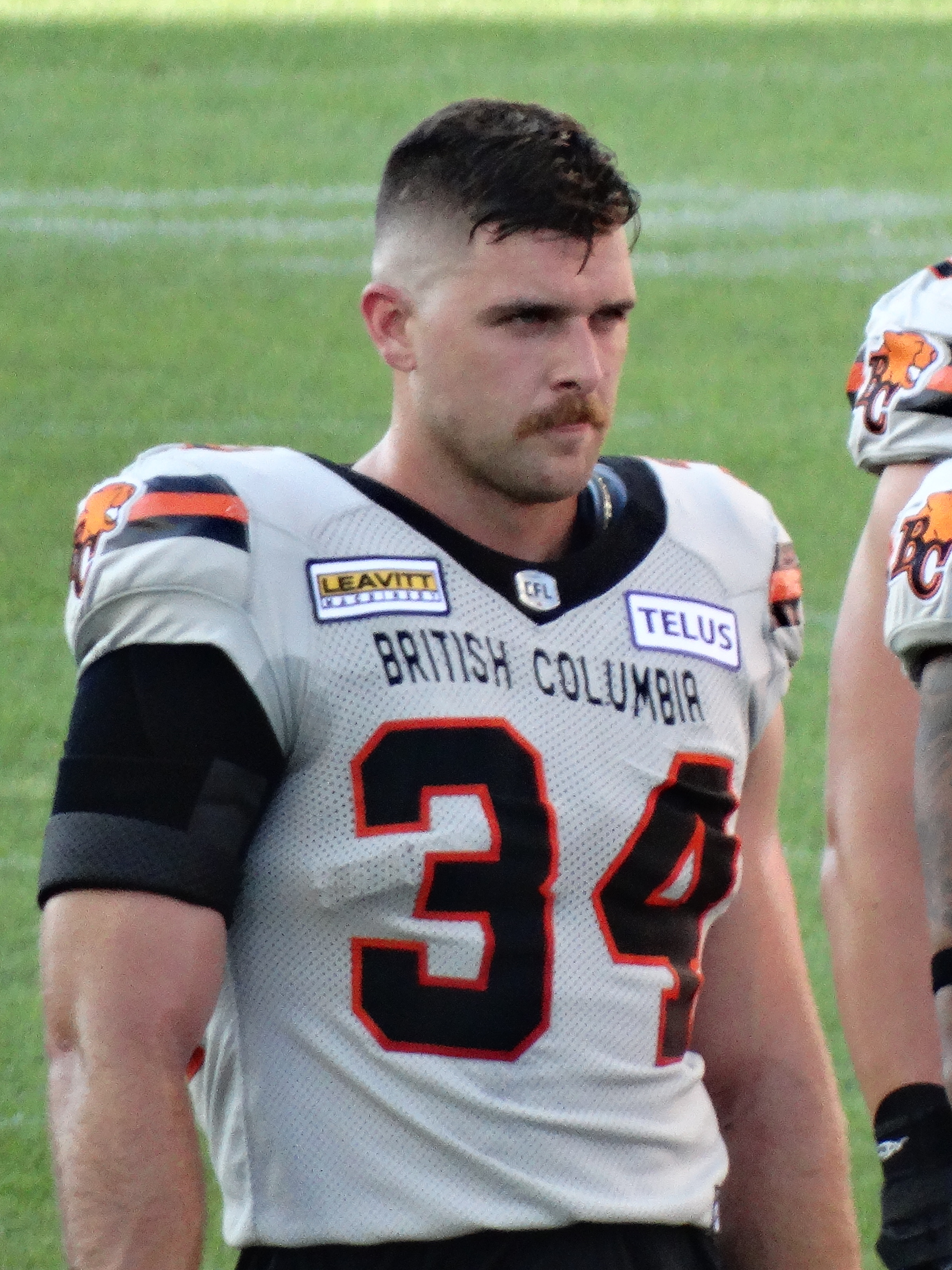
- Mackie with the BC Lions in 2023

Profile
- Position: Fullback

Personal information
- Born: May 9, 1994 (age 32); Jackson's Point, Ontario, Canada
- Listed height: 6 ft 2 in (1.88 m)
- Listed weight: 240 lb (109 kg)

Career information
- University: Western Mustangs
- CFL draft: 2018: 2nd round, 16th overall pick

Career history
- 2018–2024: BC Lions

Awards and highlights
- Vanier Cup champion (2017)
- Stats at CFL.ca

David Mackie (born May 9, 1994) is a Canadian former professional football fullback who played for six seasons in the Canadian Football League (CFL) where he spent the entirety of his career with the BC Lions.

== University career ==
Mackie played U Sports football with the Western Mustangs from 2014 to 2017 where he was a member of the 53rd Vanier Cup championship team in 2017.

== Professional career ==
Pre-draft measurables
Height	Weight	40-yard dash	20-yard shuttle	Three-cone drill	Vertical jump	Broad jump	Bench press
6 ft 2 1/8 in (1.88 m)	239 lb (108 kg)	5.07 s	4.28 s	7.51 s	34.0 in (0.86 m)	9 ft 8 3/4 in (2.97 m)	19 reps
All values from CFL Combine

Mackie was drafted in the second round, 16th overall, in the 2018 CFL draft by the BC Lions. He signed with the Lions on May 17, 2018, and made his professional debut on June 29, 2018, against the Edmonton Eskimos. Mackie signed a one-year contract extension with the Lions on January 7, 2021.

On June 25, 2022, in a game against the Toronto Argonauts, Mackie replaced the injured James Butler at running back to start the second half where he had 16 carries for 90 yards and his first career touchdown on a one-yard run.

On February 11, 2025, Mackie left the Lions as a free agent at the expiry of his contract and announced his retirement from professional football two days later. In his career, he played in 61 regular season games where he recorded 49 carries for 206 yards and eight touchdowns, 25 receptions for 203 yards, three kickoff returns for 52 yards, and 35 special teams tackles.
