= Wayne Moore (Canadian football) =

Canadian football player (born 1992)

Profile
- Position: Running back

Personal information
- Born: March 12, 1992 (age 34); Portland, Jamaica
- Listed height: 6 ft 0 in (1.83 m)
- Listed weight: 220 lb (100 kg)

Career information
- University: McMaster Marauders
- CFL draft: 2016: 2nd round, 11th overall pick

Career history
- 2016–2017: Montreal Alouettes*
- 2017–2018: Ottawa Redblacks*
- 2018–2021: BC Lions
- * Offseason or practice squad member only
- Stats at CFL.ca

Wayne Moore (born March 12, 1992) is a former professional Canadian football running back who played in the Canadian Football League (CFL). He played U Sports football with the McMaster Marauders. Moore was a member of the Montreal Alouettes, Ottawa Redblacks, and BC Lions.

== Professional career ==
=== Montreal Alouettes ===
Moore was drafted in the second round, 11th overall, in the 2016 CFL draft by the Montreal Alouettes and signed with the team on May 25, 2016. He spent the 2016 season on the injured list and practice roster and was released following the team's 2017 training camp.

=== Ottawa Redblacks ===
Following his Montreal release, Moore then signed a practice roster agreement with the Ottawa Redblacks on July 4, 2017. He did not play in a game and was again released following the next season's training camp on June 10, 2018.

=== BC Lions ===
On July 29, 2018, Moore signed a practice roster agreement with the BC Lions. He was soon promoted to the active roster and played in his first professional game on August 4, 2018 against the Calgary Stampeders. He played in 13 regular season games, recording four carries for 20 rushing yards, three catches for 12 receiving yards, and 11 special teams tackles. Following a productive year, Moore signed a two-year contract extension on February 4, 2019. In 2019, Moore played in 12 regular season games as a back-up running back and special teams player. He had 15 rush attempts for 66 yards and four catches for 79 yards in addition to four special teams tackles.

Moore signed a contract extension with the team on December 15, 2020. However, he retired from professional football on July 1, 2021 after sustaining injuries in car accident. After having missed the 2020 season because it was cancelled, and then missing the 2021 season because he was retired, on March 25, 2022, it was announced that Moore had signed a new contract with the Lions in time for the 2022 season. However, he was released just prior to training camp on May 14, 2022.
