= Hunter Steward =

Canadian gridiron football player (born 1991)

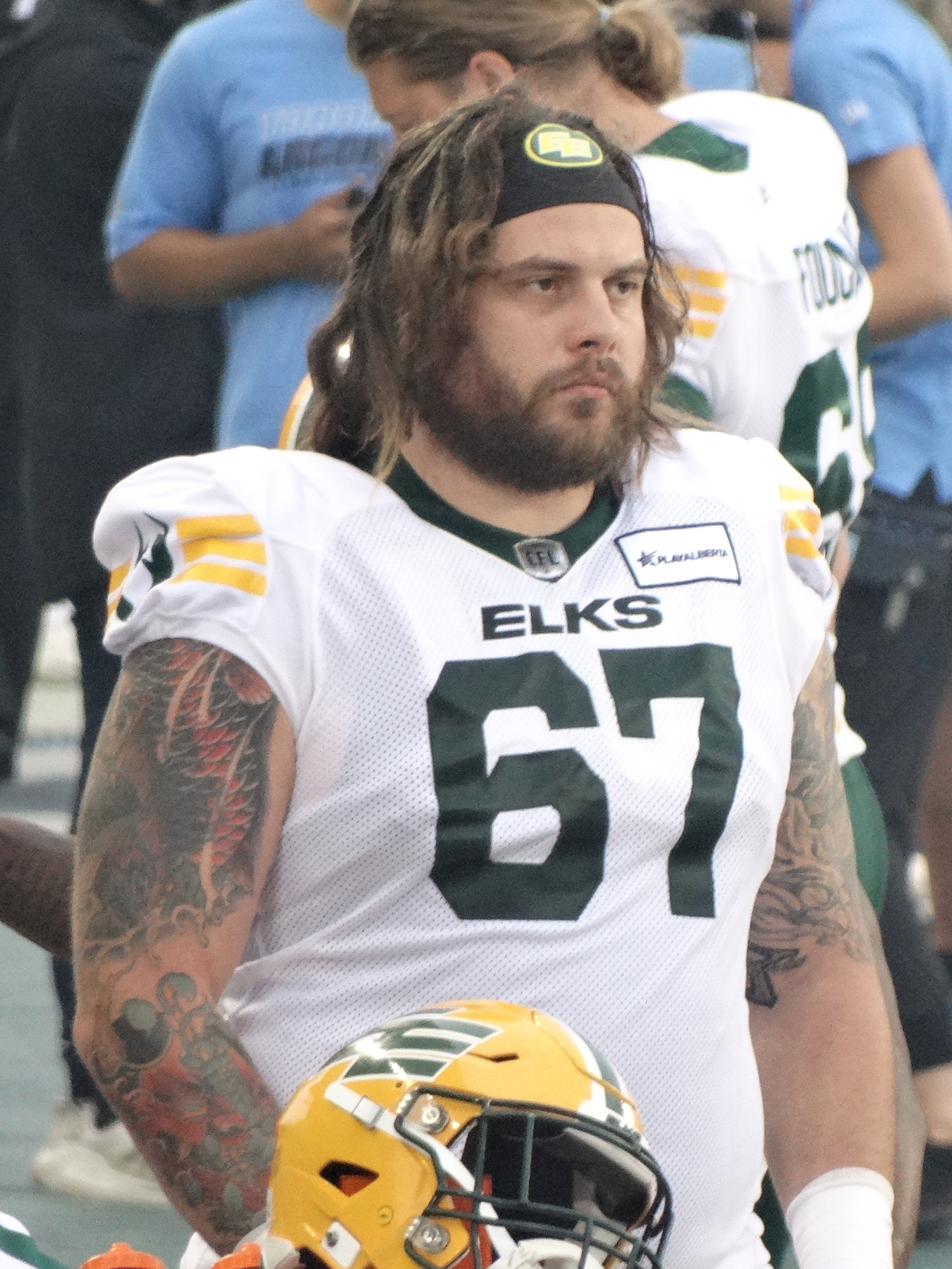
- Steward with the Edmonton Elks in 2024

Profile
- Position: Offensive lineman

Personal information
- Born: December 23, 1991 (age 34); Calgary, Alberta, Canada
- Listed height: 6 ft 6 in (1.98 m)
- Listed weight: 315 lb (143 kg)

Career information
- College: Liberty
- CFL draft: 2013: 1st round, 6th overall pick

Career history
- 2014–2021: BC Lions*
- 2022–2023: Ottawa Redblacks
- 2024: Edmonton Elks
- 2025: BC Lions
- 2026*: BC Lions
- * Offseason or practice squad member only
- Stats at CFL.ca

Hunter Steward (born December 23, 1991) is a Canadian former professional football offensive lineman.

== College career ==
Steward played college football with the Liberty Flames.

== Professional career ==
=== BC Lions (first stint) ===
Steward was selected in the first round and sixth overall by the BC Lions in the 2013 CFL draft. After completing his college eligibility, Steward signed with the team on March 25, 2014. It was announced on January 30, 2020, that Steward had signed a two-year extension to remain with the Lions. He became a free agent upon the expiry of his contract on February 8, 2022.

=== Ottawa Redblacks ===
On February 8, 2022, it was announced that Steward had signed with the Ottawa Redblacks.

=== Edmonton Elks ===
Steward signed with the Edmonton Elks through free agency on April 9, 2024. On February 11, 2025, Steward left the Elks as a free agent, upon the expiry of his contract.

=== BC Lions (second stint) ===
After going unsigned to start the 2025 CFL season, Steward re-signed with the Lions and joined their practice squad, on July 9, 2025. He was released on August 12, 2025.

On June 8, 2026, Steward signed a one-day contract to retire from professional football as a Lion.
