= Mitch Barnett (Canadian football) =

Canadian football player (born 1993)

No. 35
- Position: Linebacker

Personal information
- Born: February 23, 1993 (age 33); North Vancouver, British Columbia
- Listed height: 6 ft 1 in (1.85 m)
- Listed weight: 212 lb (96 kg)

Career information
- High school: Handsworth Secondary
- College: Simon Fraser; British Columbia
- CFL draft: 2016: 7th round, 59th overall pick

Career history
- 2016–2017: Hamilton Tiger-Cats
- 2018–2020: BC Lions

Awards and highlights
- Vanier Cup champion (2015)
- Stats at CFL.ca

Mitchell Barnett (born February 23, 1993) is a Canadian former professional football linebacker. He was drafted 59th overall in the 2016 CFL draft by the Hamilton Tiger-Cats and signed with the team on May 27, 2016. After two seasons and 29 games with the Tiger-Cats, he signed as a free agent with the BC Lions on February 13, 2018. He retired from professional football on February 11, 2021.

He played NCAA football with the Simon Fraser Clan from 2013 to 2014 before transferring to the UBC Thunderbirds football program for the 2015 CIS football season where he was part of the 51st Vanier Cup championship team.

== Personal life ==
Barnett's father, Bruce Barnett, played for the Lions from 1985 to 1986 and was part of the Lions' 73rd Grey Cup victory in 1985.
