= Sukh Chungh =

Canadian gridiron football player (born 1992)

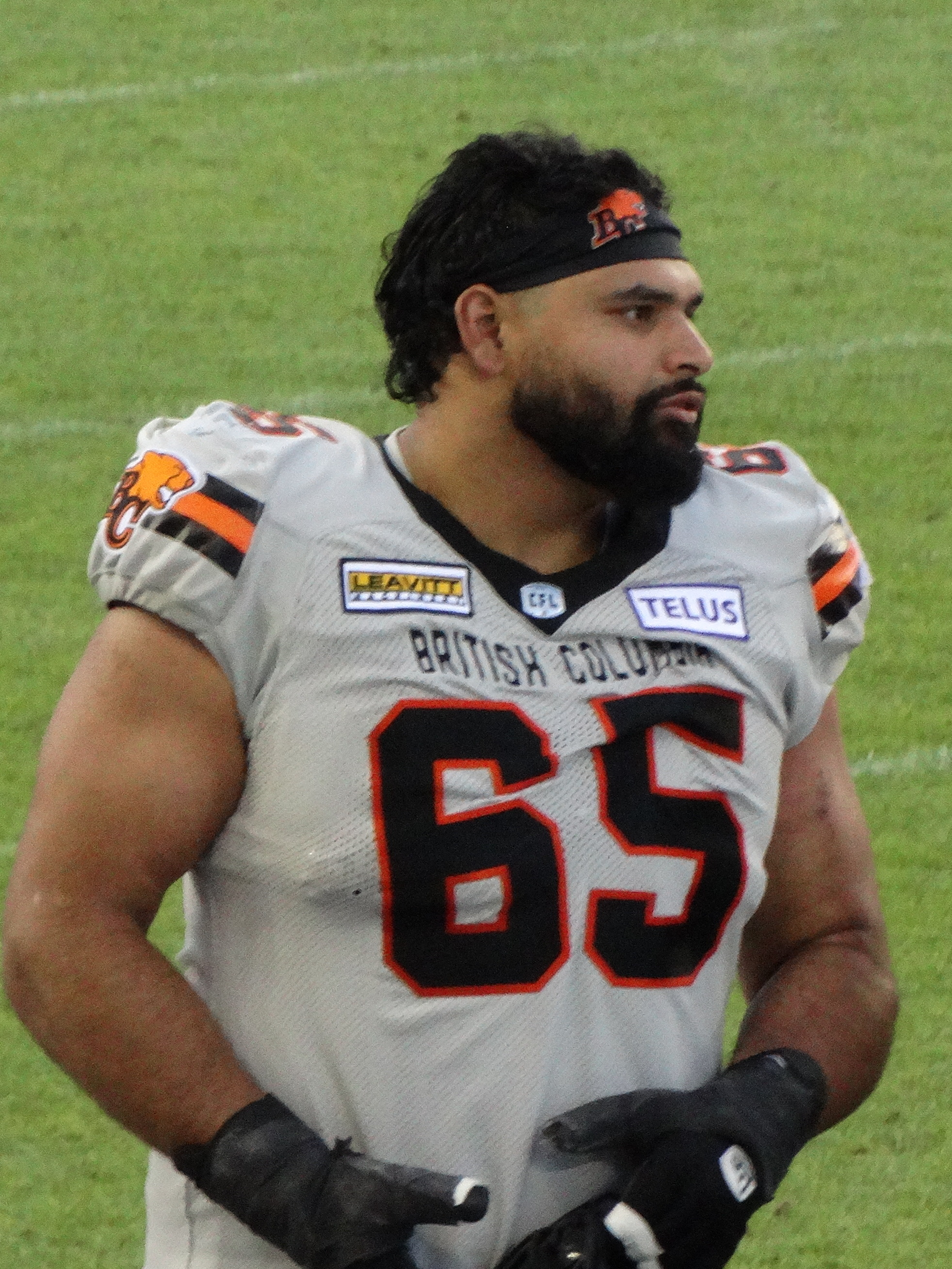
- Chungh with the BC Lions in 2024

Profile
- Position: Offensive lineman

Personal information
- Born: March 4, 1992 (age 34); Port Coquitlam, British Columbia, Canada
- Listed height: 6 ft 4 in (1.93 m)
- Listed weight: 315 lb (143 kg)

Career information
- High school: Terry Fox Secondary
- University: Calgary
- CFL draft: 2015: 1st round, 2nd overall pick

Career history
- 2015–2018: Winnipeg Blue Bombers
- 2019–2024: BC Lions

Awards and highlights
- 2× CFL West All-Star (2018, 2023)
- Stats at CFL.ca

Sukhjivan Singh Chungh (born March 4, 1992) is a Canadian professional football offensive lineman. He played CIS football at University of Calgary.

== Early life ==
Chungh's parents immigrated to Canada from India. He began playing football in the ninth grade and later won back-to-back lineman of the year honours at Terry Fox Secondary School in Port Coquitlam, British Columbia. He also set school records in several lifts like the bench press and squat. Chungh helped the team win provincial titles in 2006, 2007, and 2008. He was also named to Team World at the 2010 USA vs. The World football challenge in January 2010.

== University career ==
Chungh played CIS football for the Calgary Dinos from 2011 to 2014. He redshirted in 2010. He became a starter in 2012 while also earning CanWest All-Star and CIS All-Canadian honors in 2013 and 2014.

== Professional career ==
=== Winnipeg Blue Bombers ===
Chungh was invited to the NFL's Super Regional Combine in Arizona in 2015. He was drafted by the Winnipeg Blue Bombers of the CFL with the second overall pick in the 2015 CFL draft. He played in eighteen games for the Blue Bombers during the 2015 season. Shortly after the 2015 CFL draft, the Bombers signed Chungh to a two-year contract, which extended through the 2015 and 2016 CFL seasons. On November 14, 2016, Chungh confirmed that he signed a new one-year contract to play the 2017 CFL season with the Bombers. Over four years, he played and started in 69 regular season games for the team. He became a free agent upon the expiry of his contract on February 12, 2019.

=== BC Lions ===
On February 12, 2019, it was announced that Chungh had signed a three-year contract with his hometown BC Lions. His first year with the Lions was beset with injuries as he played and started in just eight games in 2019. He did not play in 2020 due to the cancellation of the 2020 CFL season. In 2021, he played and started in all 14 regular season games at right guard. Chungh played and started in 16 regular season games in 2022 and also played in both of the team's post-season games. He played and started in 17 regular season games in 2023 and was named a CFL West All-Star at year's end.

On February 11, 2025, Chungh's contract with the Lions expired and he became a free agent. Lions' general manager, Ryan Rigmaiden, advised that the team would be "moving on" from Chungh.
