= List of BC Lions starting quarterbacks =

The following is a list of starting quarterbacks for the BC Lions of the Canadian Football League that have started a regular season game for the team. This list includes postseason appearances since 1989, but does not include preseason games. They are listed in order of most appearances at quarterback for the Lions.

== Starting quarterbacks by season ==
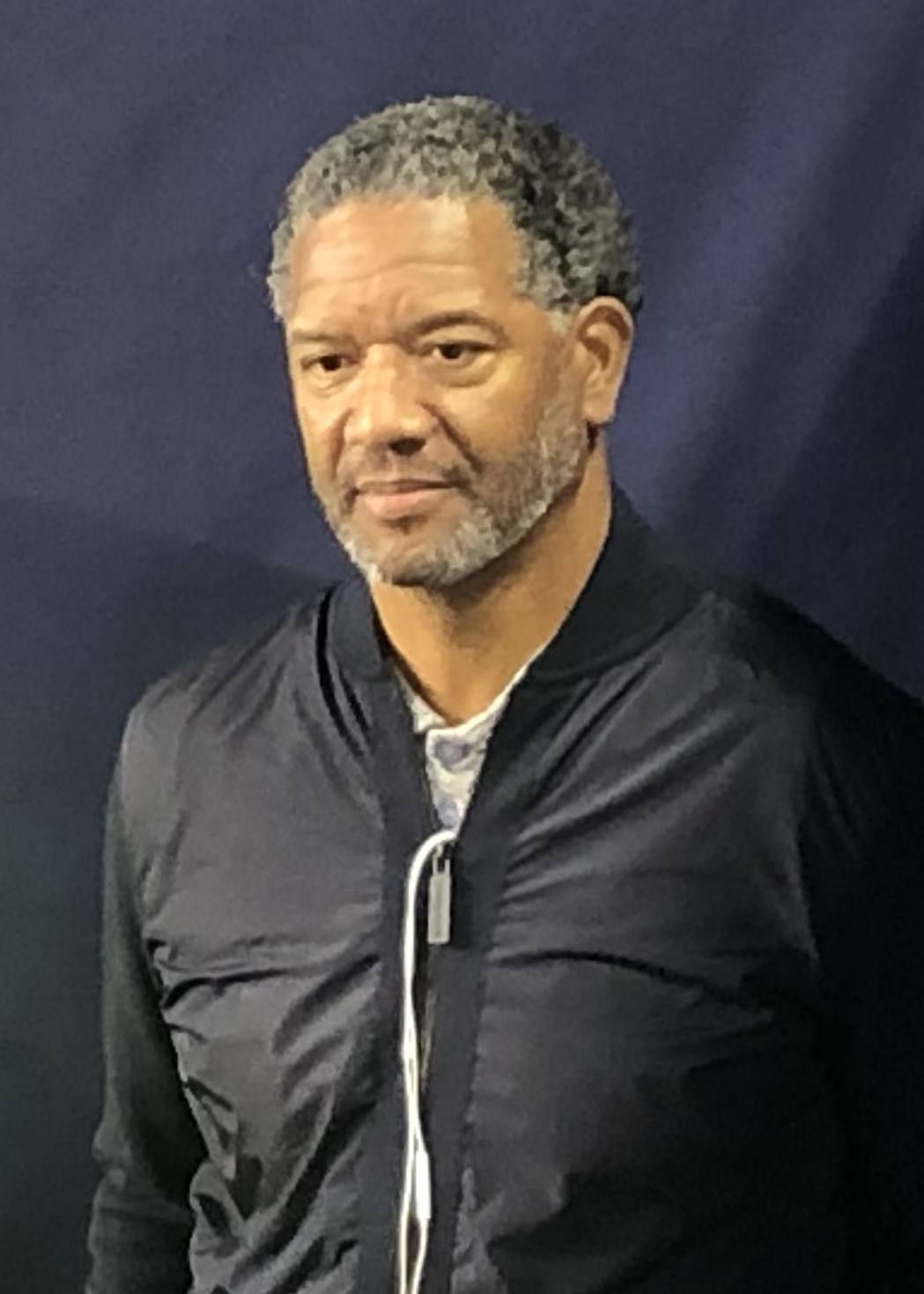
Damon Allen is the Lions' all-time leader in passing yards, completions, and touchdowns.

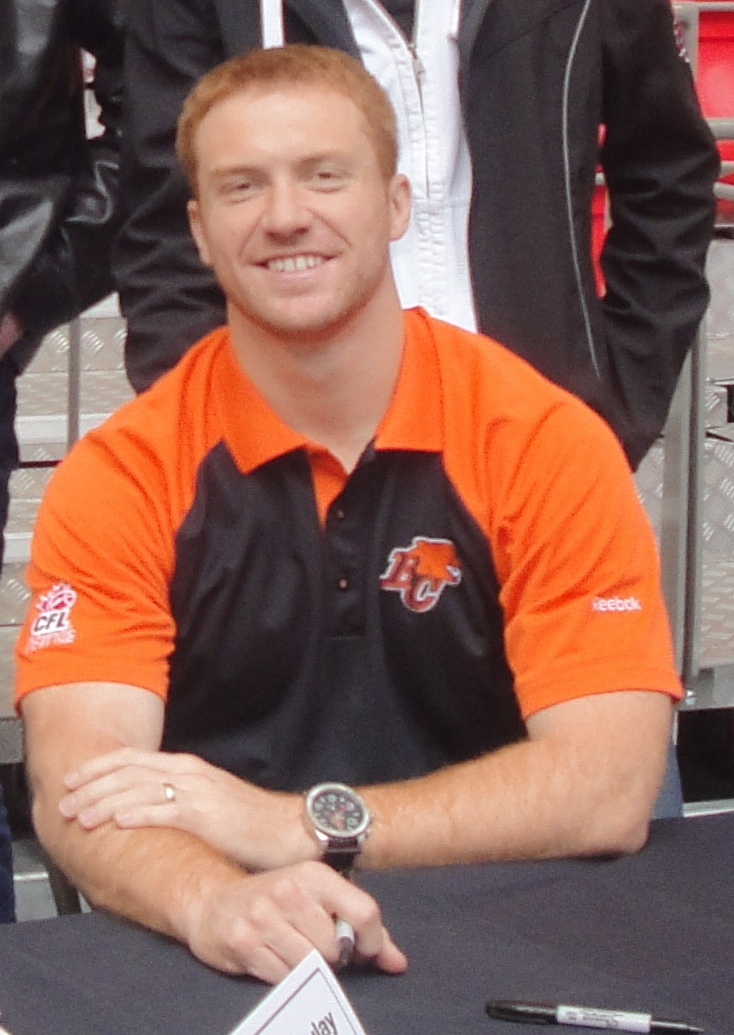
Travis Lulay was the Grey Cup MVP as the Lions won the 2011 Grey Cup.

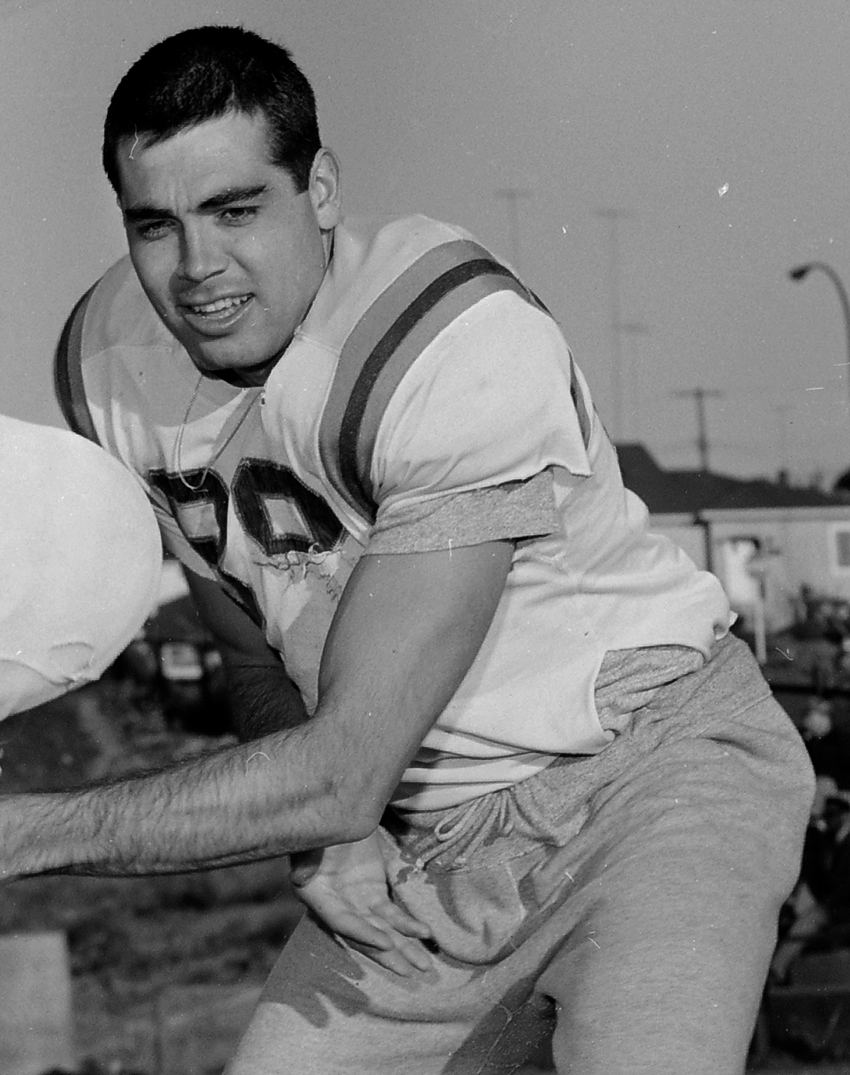
Joe Kapp led the Lions to their first Grey Cup championship in 1964.

The number of games they started during the season is listed to the right:

Season(s)	Regular season	Postseason
2026	Nathan Rourke (15) / Kaidon Salter (2) / Chase Brice (1)	Nathan Rourke (2)
2025	Nathan Rourke (16) / Jeremiah Masoli (2)	Nathan Rourke (2)
2024	Vernon Adams (9) / Jake Dolegala (1) / Nathan Rourke (8)	Vernon Adams (1)
2023	Vernon Adams (16) / Dane Evans (2)	Vernon Adams (2)
2022	Nathan Rourke (10) / Michael O'Connor (1) / Antonio Pipkin (1) / Vernon Adams (6)	Nathan Rourke (2)
2021	Michael Reilly (12) / Nathan Rourke (2)	
2020	Season cancelled due to COVID-19 pandemic	
2019	Michael Reilly (16) / Danny O'Brien (2)	
2018	Travis Lulay (12) / Jonathon Jennings (6)	Travis Lulay (1)
2017	Jonathon Jennings (14) / Travis Lulay (4)	
2016	Jonathon Jennings (18)	Jonathon Jennings (2)
2015	Travis Lulay (10) / Jonathon Jennings (6) / John Beck (2)	Jonathon Jennings (1)
2014	Kevin Glenn (17) / Travis Lulay (1)	Kevin Glenn (1)
2013	Travis Lulay (11) / Thomas DeMarco (6) / Buck Pierce (1)	Travis Lulay (1)
2012	Travis Lulay (16) / Michael Reilly (2)	Travis Lulay (1)
2011	Travis Lulay (18)	Travis Lulay (2)
2010	Travis Lulay (9) / Casey Printers (8) / Jarious Jackson (1)	Travis Lulay (1)
2009	Buck Pierce (12) / Jarious Jackson (3) / Casey Printers (3)	Casey Printers (2)
2008	Buck Pierce (11) / Jarious Jackson (7)	Buck Pierce (2)
2007	Jarious Jackson (11) / Buck Pierce (4) / Dave Dickenson (3)	Jarious Jackson (1)
2006	Dave Dickenson (12) / Buck Pierce (6)	Dave Dickenson (2)
2005	Dave Dickenson (11) / Casey Printers (6) / Buck Pierce (1)	Dave Dickenson (1)
2004	Casey Printers (14) / Dave Dickenson (4)	Casey Printers (1) / Dave Dickenson (1)
2003	Dave Dickenson (17) / Spergon Wynn (1)	Spergon Wynn (1)
2002	Damon Allen (18)	Damon Allen (1)
2001	Damon Allen (16) / Tony Corbin (2)	Damon Allen (1)
2000	Damon Allen (18)	Damon Allen (3)
1999	Damon Allen (18)	Damon Allen (1)
1998	Damon Allen (18)	Damon Allen (1)
1997	Damon Allen (18)	Damon Allen (1)
1996	Damon Allen (13) / Andre Ware (4) / Giulio Caravatta (1)	
1995	Danny McManus (17) / Giulio Caravatta (1)	Danny McManus (1)
1994	Kent Austin (15) / Danny McManus (3)	Kent Austin (2) / Danny McManus (1)
1993	Danny Barrett (15) / Danny McManus (3)	Danny Barrett (1)
1992	Danny Barrett (10) / Tony Kimbrough (4) / Michael Johnson (2) / Gilbert Renfroe (2)	
1991	Doug Flutie (18)	Doug Flutie (1)
1990	Joe Paopao (9) / Doug Flutie (8) / Rickey Foggie (1)	
1989	Matt Dunigan (18)	
1988	Matt Dunigan (17) / Rickey Foggie (1)	
1987	Roy Dewalt (16) / Greg Vavra (2)	
1986	Roy Dewalt (18)	
1985	Roy Dewalt (16)	
1984	Roy Dewalt (12) / Tim Cowan (4)	
1983	Roy Dewalt (16)	
1982	Roy Dewalt (8) / Joe Paopao (8)	
1981	Roy Dewalt (1) / Joe Paopao (15)	
1980	Roy Dewalt (6) / Joe Paopao (9) / Mike Nott (1)	
1979	Jerry Tagge (8) / Joe Paopao (8)	
1978	Jerry Tagge (15) / Gary Keithley (1)	
1977	Jerry Tagge (15) / Gary Keithley (1)	
1976	Eric Guthrie (11) / Rick Cassata (3) / John Sciarra (2)	
1975	Peter Liske (11) / Eric Guthrie (2) / Don Moorhead (3)	
1974	Don Moorhead (14) / Peter Liske (2)	
1973	Don Moorhead (12) / Carl Douglas (4)	
1972	Don Moorhead (15) / Don Bunce (1)	
1971	Don Moorhead (9) / Paul Brothers (7)	
1970	Paul Brothers (16)	
1969	Paul Brothers (16)	
1968	Paul Brothers (9) / Pete Ohler (6) / Jackie Parker (1)	
1967	Bernie Faloney (15) / Henry Schichtle (1)	
1966	Joe Kapp (16)	
1965	Joe Kapp (16)	
1964	Joe Kapp (16)	
1963	Joe Kapp (16)	
1962	Joe Kapp (16)	
1961	Joe Kapp (11) / Jim Walden (3) / Earl Keeley (1) / Bob Schloredt (1)	
1960	Jim Walden (10) / Randy Duncan (6)	
1959	Randy Duncan (16)	
1958	George Herring (10) / Al Dorow (6)	
1957	Maury Duncan (13) / Ron Vann (3)	
1956	Jerry Gustafson (10) / Tony Teresa (4) / Arnie Galiffa (1) / Primo Villanueva (1)	
1955	Arnie Galiffa (13) / Ron Clinkscale (3)	
1954	John Mazur (10) / Gerry Tuttle (4) / Gene Robillard (1)	

- * - Indicates that the number of starts is not known for that year for each quarterback

== Team passer rankings ==
Quarterbacks are listed by number of starts for the Lions.

Name	GS	W–L–T	Comp	Att	Pct	Yards	TD	Int
Damon Allen	119	61–58–0	2,027	3,421	59.3	27,621	136	85
Roy Dewalt	92	64–26–2	1,705	2,898	58.8	22,863	129	84
Joe Kapp	91	42–55–5	1,089	2,022	53.9	16,536	98	98
Travis Lulay	81	48–33–0	1,658	2,613	63.5	21,352	127	75
Don Moorhead	52	20–30–2	602	1,134	53.1	8,689	42	58
Nathan Rourke	51	32–19–0	1,108	1,559	71.1	15,788	87	51
Joe Paopao	48	24–24–0	837	1,460	57.3	11,508	79	79
Dave Dickenson	47	33–14–0	979	1,414	69.2	13,573	90	29
Paul Brothers	45	16–28–1	504	997	50.6	7,141	35	71
Jonathon Jennings	44	22–22–0	980	1,474	66.5	12,497	66	51
