= 2017 BC Lions season =

BC Lions

- General manager: Wally Buono
- Head coach: Wally Buono
- Home stadium: BC Place Stadium

Results
- Record: 7–11
- Division place: 5th, West
- Playoffs: did not qualify
- Team MOP: Solomon Elimimian
- Team MOC: Shaquille Johnson
- Team MOR: Ty Long

Uniform

The 2017 BC Lions season was the 60th season for the team in the Canadian Football League (CFL) and their 64th overall. The Lions finished the season in fifth place in the West Division with a 7–11 record and missed the playoffs for the first time since 1996, ending their playoff streak at 20 seasons, the second longest in CFL history.

This was the 11th year with Wally Buono as the team's head coach and his 15th year as general manager.

This was the eighth consecutive season that the Lions held their training camp at Hillside Stadium in Kamloops, British Columbia.

== Offseason ==
=== Free agents ===
The following is a list of players whose contracts are/were set to expire on February 14, 2017 at 9AM PDT. Players are eligible to re-sign with the Lions prior to that date and, if not signed or released before then, are eligible to sign with any team they choose.

Position	Player	2017 Team	Date of Transaction	Notes
RB	Anthony Allen			
DL	Alex Bazzie	Indianapolis Colts	January 9, 2017	Granted early release
LS	Mike Benson	BC Lions	December 19, 2016	One-year contract
DL	Mic'hael Brooks	BC Lions	February 14, 2017	Two-year contract
WR	Bryan Burnham	BC Lions	February 12, 2017	Two-year contract
DB	Steven Clarke	BC Lions	January 31, 2017	Two-year contract
LB	Solomon Elimimian	BC Lions	December 21, 2016	Two-year contract
DB	Anthony Gaitor	New Orleans Saints	January 9, 2017	Granted early release
WR	Marco Iannuzzi	BC Lions	February 14, 2017	Two-year contract
RB	Jeremiah Johnson	BC Lions	December 16, 2016	Two-year contract
LB	Nehemie Kankolongo	BC Lions	December 19, 2016	Two-year contract
DB	T. J. Lee	BC Lions	February 10, 2017	One-year contract
K/P	Richie Leone	Arizona Cardinals	January 5, 2017	Granted early release
LB	Bo Lokombo	Baltimore Ravens	January 31, 2017	Granted early release
FB	Rolly Lumbala	BC Lions	January 5, 2017	Two-year contract
K/P	Paul McCallum			
SB	Nick Moore	BC Lions	February 10, 2017	One-year contract
C	Tim O'Neill			Retired
DB	Keynan Parker	BC Lions	January 4, 2017	Two-year contract
WR	Terrell Sinkfield	Minnesota Vikings	March 30, 2017	
OL	Hunter Steward	BC Lions	February 8, 2017	One-year contract
DE	Bryant Turner	BC Lions	February 6, 2017	One-year contract
DL	Jabar Westerman	Montreal Alouettes	February 14, 2017	Three-year contract
DB	Ronnie Yell	BC Lions	February 14, 2017	One-year contract

=== CFL draft ===
The 2017 CFL draft took place on May 7, 2017. The Lions had nine selections in the eight round draft after acquiring an additional first-round pick from the Montreal Alouettes in exchange for the negotiating rights to Vernon Adams.

Round	Pick	Player	Position	School/Club team	Hometown
1	3	Daniel Vandervoort	WR	McMaster	Barrie, ON
1	7	Junior Luke	DL	Montreal	Montreal, QC
2	16	Jeremy Zver	OL	Regina	Regina, SK
3	24	Frederic Chagnon	LB	Montreal	Montreal, QC
4	33	Nathaniel Hamlin	DB	Carleton	Ottawa, ON
5	42	Edward Godin	DL	Laval	Quebec City, QC
6	51	Dakota Brush	WR	Mount Allison	Brantford, ON
7	60	Jordan Herdman	LB	Simon Fraser	Winnipeg, MB
8	69	Mitchell Hillis	WR	Saskatchewan	Saskatoon, SK

== Preseason ==
Week	Date	Kickoff	Opponent	Results		TV	Venue	Attendance	Summary
Week	Date	Kickoff	Opponent	Score	Record	TV	Venue	Attendance	Summary
A	Tue, June 6	6:00 p.m. PDT	at Calgary Stampeders	L 18–23	0–1	None	McMahon Stadium	25,139	Recap
B	Fri, June 16	7:00 p.m. PDT	vs. Saskatchewan Roughriders	W 42–10	1–1	TSN	BC Place	15,632	Recap

# Games played with colour uniforms.

== Regular season ==
=== Standings ===
West Division
Team	GP	W	L	T	Pts	PF	PA	Div	Stk	
Calgary Stampeders	18	13	4	1	27	523	349	7–3	L3	Details
Winnipeg Blue Bombers	18	12	6	0	24	554	492	6–4	W1	Details
Edmonton Eskimos	18	12	6	0	24	510	495	5–5	W5	Details
Saskatchewan Roughriders	18	10	8	0	20	510	430	4–6	L1	Details
BC Lions	18	7	11	0	14	469	501	3–7	L1	Details

=== Schedule ===
Week	Date	Kickoff	Opponent	Results		TV	Venue	Attendance	Summary
Week	Date	Kickoff	Opponent	Score	Record	TV	Venue	Attendance	Summary
1	Sat, June 24	7:00 p.m. PDT	vs. Edmonton Eskimos	L 27–30	0–1	TSN/ESPN2	BC Place	19,175	Recap
2	Fri, June 30	4:00 p.m. PDT	at Toronto Argonauts	W 28–15	1–1	TSN/ESPN2	BMO Field	11,219	Recap
3	Thurs, July 6	4:30 p.m. PDT	at Montreal Alouettes	W 23–16	2–1	TSN/RDS/ESPNews	Molson Stadium	18,728	Recap
4	Sat, July 15	4:30 p.m. PDT	at Hamilton Tiger-Cats	W 41–26	3–1	TSN/RDS	Tim Hortons Field	24,135	Recap
5	Fri, July 21	7:00 p.m. PDT	vs. Winnipeg Blue Bombers	W 45–42	4–1	TSN	BC Place	21,017	Recap
6	Fri, July 28	6:30 p.m. PDT	at Edmonton Eskimos	L 26–37	4–2	TSN/RDS2/ESPN2	Commonwealth Stadium	32,837	Recap
7	Sat, Aug 5	4:00 p.m. PDT	vs. Saskatchewan Roughriders	W 30–15	5–2	TSN	BC Place	23,415	Recap
8	Sun, Aug 13	5:00 p.m. PDT	at Saskatchewan Roughriders	L 8–41	5–3	TSN/ESPN2	Mosaic Stadium	33,350	Recap
9	Fri, Aug 18	7:30 p.m. PDT	vs. Calgary Stampeders	L 17–21	5–4	TSN	BC Place	20,622	Recap
10	Sat, Aug 26	12:30 p.m. PDT	at Ottawa Redblacks	L 24–31	5–5	TSN/RDS2	TD Place Stadium	24,887	Recap
11	Bye								
12	Fri, Sept 8	7:00 p.m. PDT	vs. Montreal Alouettes	W 41–18	6–5	TSN/RDS	BC Place	18,029	Recap
13	Sat, Sept 16	4:00 p.m. PDT	at Calgary Stampeders	L 13–27	6–6	TSN/RDS	McMahon Stadium	28,176	Recap
14	Fri, Sept 22	8:00 p.m. PDT	vs Hamilton Tiger-Cats	L 23–24	6–7	TSN	BC Place	18,091	Recap
15	Bye								
16	Sat, Oct 7	4:00 p.m. PDT	vs Ottawa Redblacks	L 25–30	6–8	TSN	BC Place	19,324	Recap
17	Sat, Oct 14	1:00 p.m. PDT	at Winnipeg Blue Bombers	L 20–26	6–9	TSN/RDS2	Investors Group Field	26,434	Recap
18	Sat, Oct 21	7:00 p.m. PDT	vs. Edmonton Eskimos	L 29–35 (OT)	6–10	TSN	BC Place	19,816	Recap
19	Sat, Oct 28	1:00 p.m. PDT	at Winnipeg Blue Bombers	W 36–27	7–10	TSN/RDS2	Investors Group Field	25,034	Recap
20	Sat, Nov 4	7:00 p.m. PDT	vs. Toronto Argonauts	L 13–40	7–11	TSN	BC Place	19,233	Recap

# Games played with colour uniforms.
# Games played with white uniforms.

== Roster ==
2017 BC Lions final roster
Quarterbacks: 13 Mitch Gale; 10 Jonathon Jennings; 9 Alex Ross; Running backs: 26 Dakota Brush; 24 Jeremiah Johnson; 46 Rolly Lumbala; 2 Chris Rainey; Receivers: 84 Emmanuel Arceneaux; 16 Bryan Burnham; 87 Marco Iannuzzi; 88 Shaq Johnson; 17 Nick Moore; 11 Danny Vandervoort; 80 Chris Williams	Offensive linemen: 50 Kirby Fabien G; 61 David Foucault T; 62 Cody Husband C; 57 Antonio Johnson T; 64 Andrew Jones G; 58 Keavon Milton T; 69 Charles Vaillancourt G/C; Defensive linemen: 4 Alex Bazzie DE; 90 Mic'hael Brooks DT; 99 Kourtnei Brown DE; 95 Ricky Foley DE; 48 Maxx Forde DT; 91 Junior Luke DT; 78 David Ménard DE; 77 Louie Richardson DE; 93 Craig Roh DE; 92 Bryant Turner DT	Linebackers: 51 Micah Awe; 47 Frédéric Chagnon; 36 Dyshawn Davis; 56 Solomon Elimimian; 53 Jordan Herdman; Defensive backs: 7 Matt Bucknor; 39 Chandler Fenner; 37 Kendall James; 6 T. J. Lee; 20 Keynan Parker; 0 Loucheiz Purifoy; 8 Anthony Thompson; 25 Ronnie Yell; Special teams: 40 Mike Benson LS; 1 Ty Long K/P	Practice roster: --- PJ Davis LB; 19 Tyler Davis RB; 66 Felix Gacusana G; 28 Nate Hamlin DB; 54 Andrew Hudson DE; 33 Tevin McDonald DB; 32 Alex Ogbongbemiga FB; 68 Kelvin Palmer T; Injured list: 41 Adrian Clarke LB; 55 Jaskaran Dhillon OL; 94 DeQuin Evans DE; 3 Buddy Jackson DB; 14 Travis Lulay QB; 74 Luther Maddy DT; 98 Josh Shirley DE; 67 Hunter Steward G; 18 Dontre Wilson SB; Suspended: Frank Alexander DE; Adrian Bellard T; Italics indicate American players Roster updated 2026-05-17; Depth Chart • Transactions

== Coaching staff ==
BC Lions Staff
Front office and support staff: Owner – David Braley; President and ceo – Dennis Skulsky; General manager and vice president of football operations – Wally Buono; Director of football operations & player personnel – Neil McEvoy; Director of us scouting – Ryan Rigmaiden; Player-Business Developmental Advisor – Geroy Simon; Football Operations Consultant, Scout –Roy Shivers; Area Scout –Mike McCarthy; Video assistant – Andrew Millin; Head Trainer – Bill Reichelt; Assistant athletic therapist – Tristan Sandhu; Strength and Conditioning Trainer – Chris Boyko; Equipment manager – Ken "Kato" Kasuya; Equipment assistant – Andrew Dubiellak; Equipment assistant – Stu Mitchell; Director of communications – Jamie Cartmell	Head coaches: Head coach – Wally Buono; Offensive coaches: Offensive coordinator and quarterbacks – Khari Jones; Running backs – Adam Blasetti; Receivers – Marcel Bellefeuille; Offensive line – Dan Dorazio; Defensive coaches: Defensive coordinator and defensive backs – Mark Washington; Defensive line – Robin Ross; Linebackers – Chris Tormey; Special teams coaches: Special teams coordinator – Marcello Simmons; Strength and conditioning: Strength and conditioning trainer – Chris Boyko; → Coaching staff
