= 1955 Ottawa Rough Riders season =

Canadian football team season

- Head coach: Chan Caldwell
- Home stadium: Lansdowne Park

Results
- Record: 3–9
- Division place: 4th, IRFU
- Playoffs: Did not qualify

The 1955 Ottawa Rough Riders finished in fourth place in the IRFU with a 3–9 record and failed to qualify for the playoffs for the fourth consecutive season.

== Preseason ==
Game	Date	Opponent	Results		Venue	Attendance
Game	Date	Opponent	Score	Record	Venue	Attendance
A	Aug 6	vs. Calgary Stampeders	L 11–12	0–1		
B	Aug 12	vs. Saskatchewan Roughriders	W 24–17	1–1		

== Regular season ==
=== Standings ===
Interprovincial Rugby Football Union
Team	GP	W	L	T	PF	PA	Pts
Montreal Alouettes	12	9	3	0	388	214	18
Hamilton Tiger-Cats	12	8	4	0	271	193	16
Toronto Argonauts	12	4	8	0	239	328	8
Ottawa Rough Riders	12	3	9	0	174	337	6

=== Schedule ===
Week	Game	Date	Opponent	Results		Venue	Attendance
Week	Game	Date	Opponent	Score	Record	Venue	Attendance
1	1	Sept 3	at Montreal Alouettes	L 22–34	0–1		
1	2	Sept 5	vs. Montreal Alouettes	W 19–18	1–1		
2	3	Sept 10	at Hamilton Tiger-Cats	L 12–23	1–2		
3	4	Sept 17	at Toronto Argonauts	W 27–12	2–2		
4	5	Sept 24	vs. Toronto Argonauts	L 19–30	2–3		
5	6	Oct 1	vs. Hamilton Tiger-Cats	L 0–40	2–4		
6	7	Oct 8	vs. Montreal Alouettes	L 7–35	2–5		
6	8	Oct 10	at Montreal Alouettes	L 6–43	2–6		
7	9	Oct 15	at Hamilton Tiger-Cats	L 1–28	2–7		
8	10	Oct 22	vs. Hamilton Tiger-Cats	L 12–21	2–8		
9	11	Oct 29	at Toronto Argonauts	L 13–29	2–9		
10	12	Nov 5	vs. Toronto Argonauts	W 36–24	3–9		
