= 1955 BC Lions season =

Canadian football team season

- Head coach: Annis Stukus
- Home stadium: Empire Stadium

Results
- Record: 5–11
- Division place: 4th, W.I.F.U.
- Playoffs: did not qualify

Uniform

The 1955 BC Lions finished the season in fourth place in the W.I.F.U. with a 5–11 record, improving upon their inaugural season, but still could not qualify for the playoffs.

At the end of the season, Annis Stukus, who help organize and spearhead the new CFL expansion franchise, was dropped as head coach after two seasons. On December 7, former Ottawa Rough Riders head coach, Clem Crowe, was elevated from assistant to the second head coach in Lions history.

Guard Bob Levenhagen was the only Lion to be a WIFU All-star.

== Preseason ==
Game	Date	Opponent	Results		Venue	Attendance
Game	Date	Opponent	Score	Record	Venue	Attendance
A	Wed, Aug 10	vs. Toronto Argonauts	W 30–24	1–0	Empire Stadium	22,448

== Regular season ==
=== Season standings ===
Western Interprovincial Football Union
Team	GP	W	L	T	PF	PA	Pts
Edmonton Eskimos	16	14	2	0	286	117	28
Saskatchewan Roughriders	16	10	6	0	270	245	20
Winnipeg Blue Bombers	16	7	9	0	210	195	14
BC Lions	16	5	11	0	211	330	10
Calgary Stampeders	16	4	12	0	209	299	8

=== Season schedule ===
Week	Game	Date	Opponent	Results		Venue	Attendance
Week	Game	Date	Opponent	Score	Record	Venue	Attendance
1	1	Mon, Aug 22	vs. Calgary Stampeders	W 14–8	1–0	Empire Stadium	28,103
2	2	Sat, Aug 27	at Edmonton Eskimos	L 12–29	1–1	Clarke Stadium	17,500
2	3	Mon, Aug 29	vs. Saskatchewan Roughriders	L 13–19	1–2	Empire Stadium	27,008
3	4	Sat, Sept 3	at Winnipeg Blue Bombers	W 15–7	2–2	Winnipeg Stadium	16,458
3	5	Mon, Sept 5	at Saskatchewan Roughriders	W 24–23	3–2	Taylor Field	16,052
4	6	Sat, Sept 10	vs. Edmonton Eskimos	L 13–18	3–3	Empire Stadium	29,503
5	7	Sat, Sept 17	vs. Winnipeg Blue Bombers	L 19–20	3–4	Empire Stadium	27,132
5	8	Mon, Sept 19	at Calgary Stampeders	W 24–18	4–4	Mewata Stadium	11,000
6	9	Mon, Sept 26	vs. Edmonton Eskimos	L 0–15	4–5	Empire Stadium	24,241
7	10	Sat, Oct 1	vs. Saskatchewan Roughriders	L 9–24	4–6	Empire Stadium	23,321
7	11	Mon, Oct 3	at Calgary Stampeders	L 6–18	4–7	Mewata Stadium	12,000
8	12	Sat, Oct 8	at Edmonton Eskimos	L 3–38	4–8	Clarke Stadium	16,500
8	13	Mon, Oct 10	vs. Winnipeg Blue Bombers	L 4–18	4–9	Empire Stadium	21,429
9	14	Sat, Oct 15	vs. Calgary Stampeders	W 36–18	5–9	Empire Stadium	16,951
10	15	Sat, Oct 22	at Saskatchewan Roughriders	L 7–33	5–10	Taylor Field	10,000
11	16	Mon, Oct 24	at Winnipeg Blue Bombers	L 13–24	5–11	Winnipeg Stadium	14,730

=== Offensive leaders ===
Player	Passing yds	Rushing yds	Receiving yds	TD
Arnold Galiffa	2273	-52	0	0
Al Pollard		557	99	4
By Bailey		384	158	2
Ron Clinkscale	462	376	188	4
Gil Bartosh	53	350	428	5
Primo Villanueva	62	317	234	4
Dan Edwards		0	681	3
Sam Adams		0	575	3

== 1955 Canadian Football Awards ==
None
