= 1955 Edmonton Eskimos season =

Canadian football team season

- General manager: Al Anderson
- Head coach: Pop Ivy
- Home stadium: Clarke Stadium

Results
- Record: 14–2
- Division place: 1st, WIFU
- Playoffs: Won Grey Cup

The 1955 Edmonton Eskimos finished in first place in the Western Interprovincial Football Union with a 14–2 record and won the 43rd Grey Cup, repeating as Grey Cup champions.

== Pre-season ==
=== Schedule ===
Game	Date	Opponent	Results		Venue	Attendance
Game	Date	Opponent	Score	Record	Venue	Attendance
A	Wed, Aug 10	Hamilton Tiger-Cats	W 21–6	1–0	Clarke Stadium	10,000
A	Sat, Aug 13	Toronto Argonauts	W 29–18	2–0	Clarke Stadium	10,000

== Regular season ==
=== Standings ===
Western Interprovincial Football Union
Team	GP	W	L	T	PF	PA	Pts
Edmonton Eskimos	16	14	2	0	286	117	28
Saskatchewan Roughriders	16	10	6	0	270	245	20
Winnipeg Blue Bombers	16	7	9	0	210	195	14
BC Lions	16	5	11	0	211	330	10
Calgary Stampeders	16	4	12	0	209	299	8

=== Schedule ===
Week	Game	Date	Opponent	Results		Venue	Attendance
Week	Game	Date	Opponent	Score	Record	Venue	Attendance
1	1	Sat, Aug 20	at Calgary Stampeders	W 13–10	1–0	Mewata Stadium	14,000
1	2	Mon, Aug 22	at Winnipeg Blue Bombers	W 13–9	2–0	Winnipeg Stadium	16,835
2	3	Sat, Aug 27	vs. BC Lions	W 29–14	3–0	Clarke Stadium	17,500
3	4	Sat, Sept 3	vs. Saskatchewan Roughriders	W 19–12	4–0	Clarke Stadium	19,500
4	5	Sat, Sept 10	at BC Lions	W 18–13	5–0	Empire Stadium	29,503
4	6	Mon, Sept 12	vs. Calgary Stampeders	W 24–12	6–0	Clarke Stadium	15,000
5	7	Sat, Sept 17	at Saskatchewan Roughriders	W 26–9	7–0	Taylor Field	14,500
5	8	Mon, Sept 19	vs. Winnipeg Blue Bombers	W 14–8	8–0	Clarke Stadium	12,500
6	9	Sat, Sept 24	at Calgary Stampeders	W 15–0	9–0	Mewata Stadium	10,000
6	10	Mon, Sept 26	at BC Lions	W 15–0	10–0	Empire Stadium	24,241
7	11	Sat, Oct 1	at Winnipeg Blue Bombers	L 0–12	10–1	Winnipeg Stadium	18,884
7	12	Mon, Oct 3	vs. Saskatchewan Roughriders	W 17–9	11–1	Clarke Stadium	15,000
8	13	Sat, Oct 8	vs. BC Lions	W 38–2	12–1	Clarke Stadium	16,500
9	14	Sat, Oct 15	at Saskatchewan Roughriders	L 3–4	12–2	Taylor Field	11,590
10	15	Sat, Oct 22	vs. Winnipeg Blue Bombers	W 12–0	13–2	Clarke Stadium	16,000
11	16	Sat, Oct 29	vs. Calgary Stampeders	W 30–5	14–2	Clarke Stadium	13,000

== Playoffs ==
Round	Date	Opponent	Results		Venue	Attendance
Round	Date	Opponent	Score	Record	Venue	Attendance
Western Final #1	Nov 11	at Winnipeg Blue Bombers	W 29–6	1–0	Winnipeg Stadium	15,553
Western Final #2	Nov 16	vs. Winnipeg Blue Bombers	W 26–6	2–0	Clarke Stadium	12,000
43rd Grey Cup	Nov 26	vs. Montreal Alouettes	W 34–19	3–0	Empire Stadium	39,417

=== Grey Cup ===
Teams	1	2	3	4	Final
Montreal Alouettes	13	6	0	0	19
Edmonton Eskimos	6	12	12	4	34
