= Clinkscale =

Clinkscale or Clinkscales is a surname. Notable people with the surname include:

== Surnames ==
- Cliff Clinkscales (born 1984), American basketball player
- Dextor Clinkscale (born 1958), American football player
- Joey Clinkscales (born 1964), American football player
- Ron Clinkscale (1933–2024), American football player

== Middle name ==
- James Clinkscales Hill (1924–2017), American judge
