= Bear Creek School =

Bear Creek School may refer to:

- The Bear Creek School, Washington, United States
- Bear Creek High School (California), Stockton, United States
- Bear Creek High School (Colorado), Lakewood, United States
- Bear Creek Secondary School, Ontario, Canada
