= Daniel Vandervoort =

Canadian football player (born 1994)

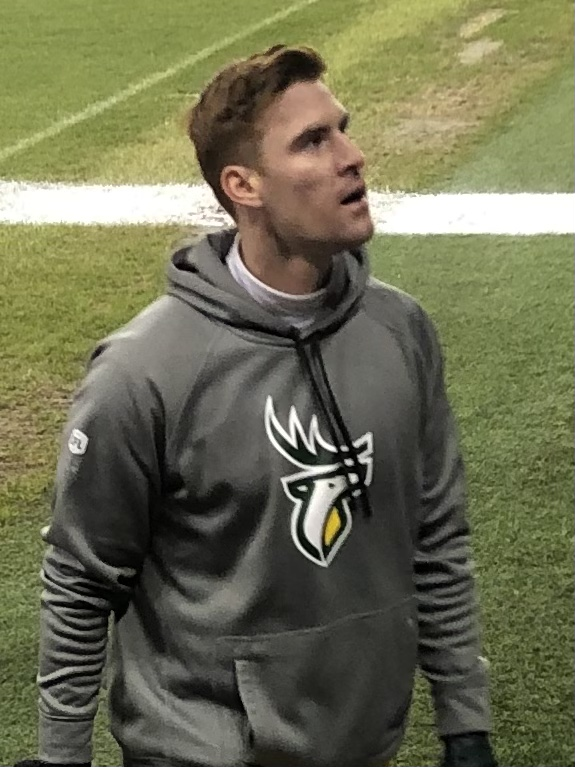
- Vandervoort with the Edmonton Elks in 2021

Profile
- Position: WR

Personal information
- Born: March 13, 1994 (age 32); Barrie, Ontario, Canada
- Listed height: 6 ft 1 in (1.85 m)
- Listed weight: 204 lb (93 kg)

Career information
- High school: Bear Creek, Barrie ON
- University: McMaster
- CFL draft: 2017: 1st round, 3rd overall pick

Career history
- 2017–2018: BC Lions
- 2019–2023: Edmonton Eskimos / Elks

Awards and highlights
- Peter Gorman Trophy (2013)
- Stats at CFL.ca

Daniel "Danny" Vandervoort (born March 13, 1994) is a Canadian professional football wide receiver. Vandervoort was drafted in the first round, third overall by the BC Lions in the 2017 CFL draft. He has also played for the Edmonton Eskimos / Elks.

== College career ==
Vandervoort played college football at McMaster University playing for the McMaster Marauders where he was named CIS rookie of the year in 2013. Vandervoort collected 831 yards and five touchdowns in his final season with the Mauraders. Over four years at McMaster, he hauled in 148 receptions and 2,572 receiving yards. His 29 career receiving touchdowns are also third all-time in U Sports history.

== Professional career ==
Pre-draft measurables
Height	Weight	40-yard dash	20-yard shuttle	Three-cone drill	Vertical jump	Broad jump	Bench press
6 ft 1 in (1.85 m)	203 lb (92 kg)	4.73 s	4.35 s	7.20 s	31.5 in (0.80 m)	9 ft 6 in (2.90 m)	13 reps
All values from CFL Combine

=== BC Lions ===
Vandervoort was the third overall selection in the 2017 CFL draft. He dressed in all 18 games during the 2017 season and recorded his first reception on July 21, 2017 against the Winnipeg Blue Bombers, which was his only catch of the season. Despite dressing in eight games in 2018 for the Lions Vandervoort did not record a catch. On April 30, 2019, Vandervoort was released by the Lions as the team trimmed its roster down to 75 players in preparation for the new season.

=== Edmonton Eskimos/Elks ===
On September 30, 2019, Vandervoort signed with the Edmonton Eskimos (CFL). He did not make an appearance during the 2019 season. After the 2020 season was cancelled Vandervoort signed a one-year contract extension with the Elks on December 26, 2020. He had his most productive season on the field in 2022, catching eight passes for 75 yards and one touchdown. On January 17, 2023 Vandervoort and the Elks agreed to another contract extension. He was released on September 24, 2023.

== Career statistics ==
		Receiving
Year	Team	GP	Rec	Att	Yards	Avg	Long	TD
2017	BC	18	1	3	25	25.0	25	0
2018	BC	8	0	0	0	0.0	0	0
2019	EDM	0	0	0	0	0.0	0	0
2020	--	Season Cancelled
2021	EDM	13	3	4	54	18.0	26	2
2022	EDM	18	8	12	75	9.4	28	1
CFL totals		57	12	19	154	12.8	25	3
