= Regis High School (Oregon) =

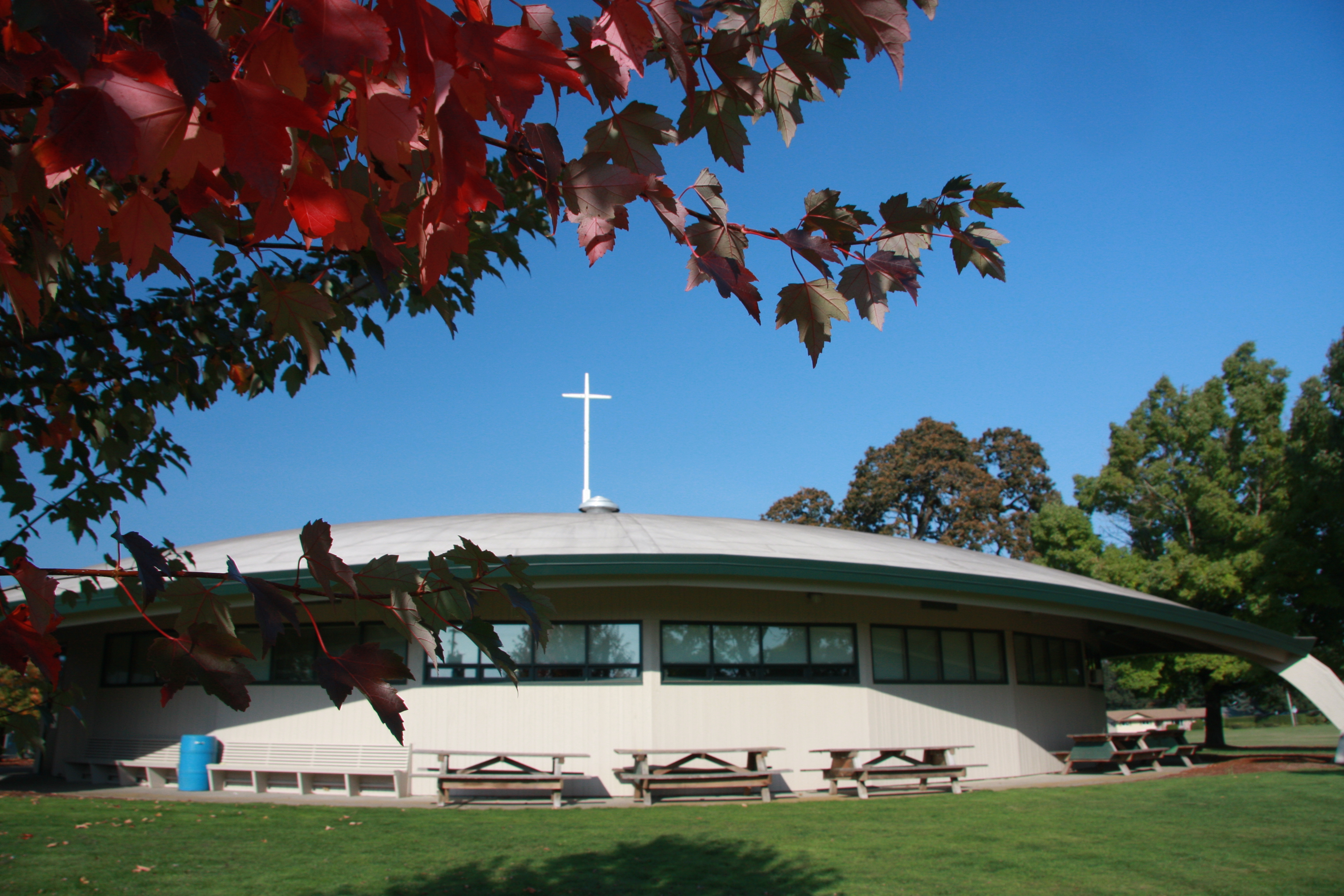

Location
- 550 West Regis Street; Stayton, Marion County, Oregon 97383; United States; 44.807559°N 122.798932°W

Information
- Type: Private, Coeducational
- Religious affiliation: Roman Catholic
- Established: 1963
- Superintendent: Archbishop Sample
- Principal: Aaron Persons
- Grades: 9–12
- Enrollment: 120 (2020-2021)
- Colors: Green and Vegas gold
- Athletics conference: OSAA Tri-River Conference 2A-3
- Mascot: Rams
- Rival: Blanchet Catholic High School
- Accreditation: Northwest Accreditation Commission
- Newspaper: OurTown
- Website: www.regisstmary.org
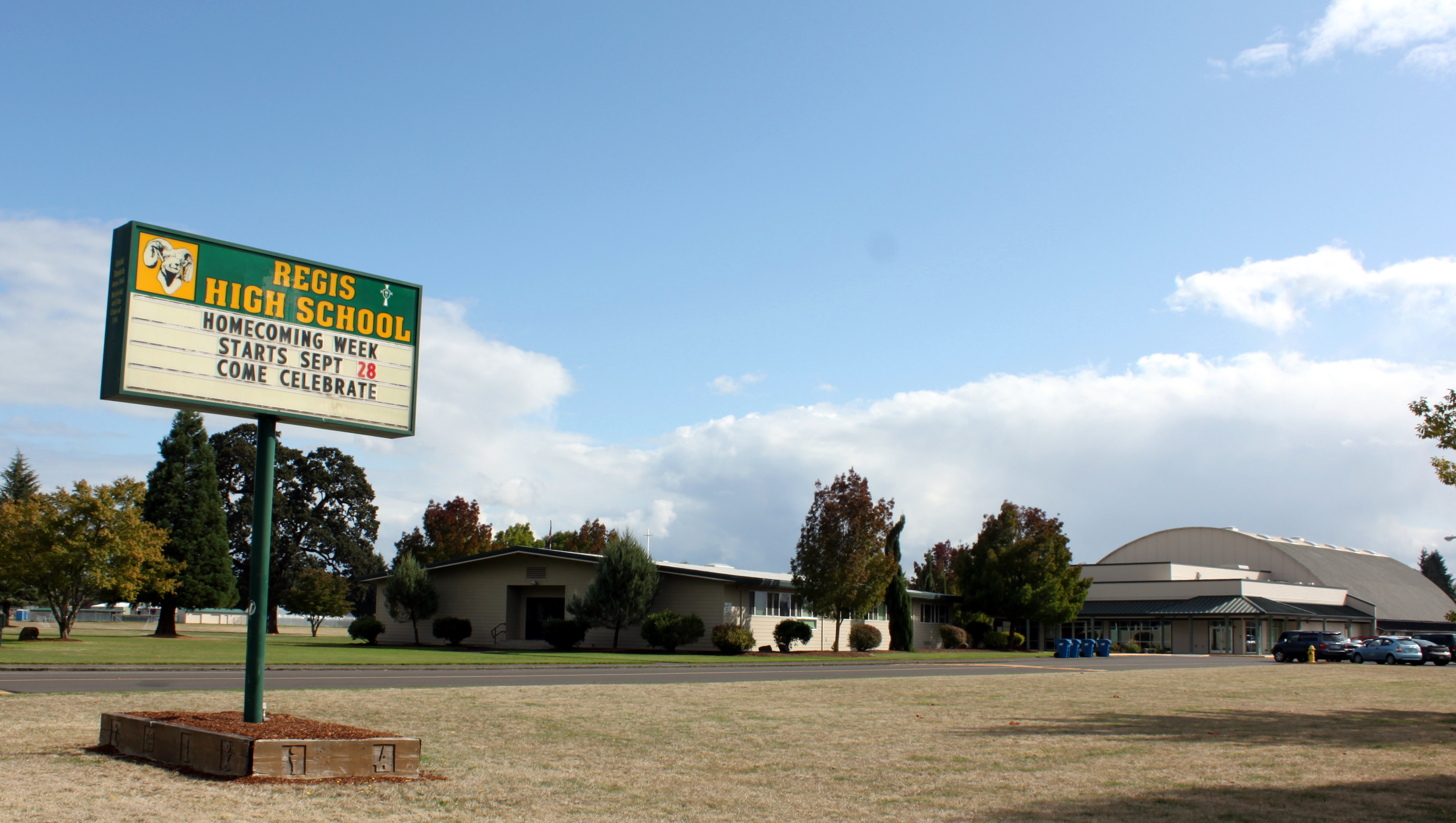

Regis High School is a private Roman Catholic high school in Stayton, Oregon, United States. It is located in the Roman Catholic Archdiocese of Portland. Regis High School is one of two Catholic high schools in Marion County.

== Academics ==
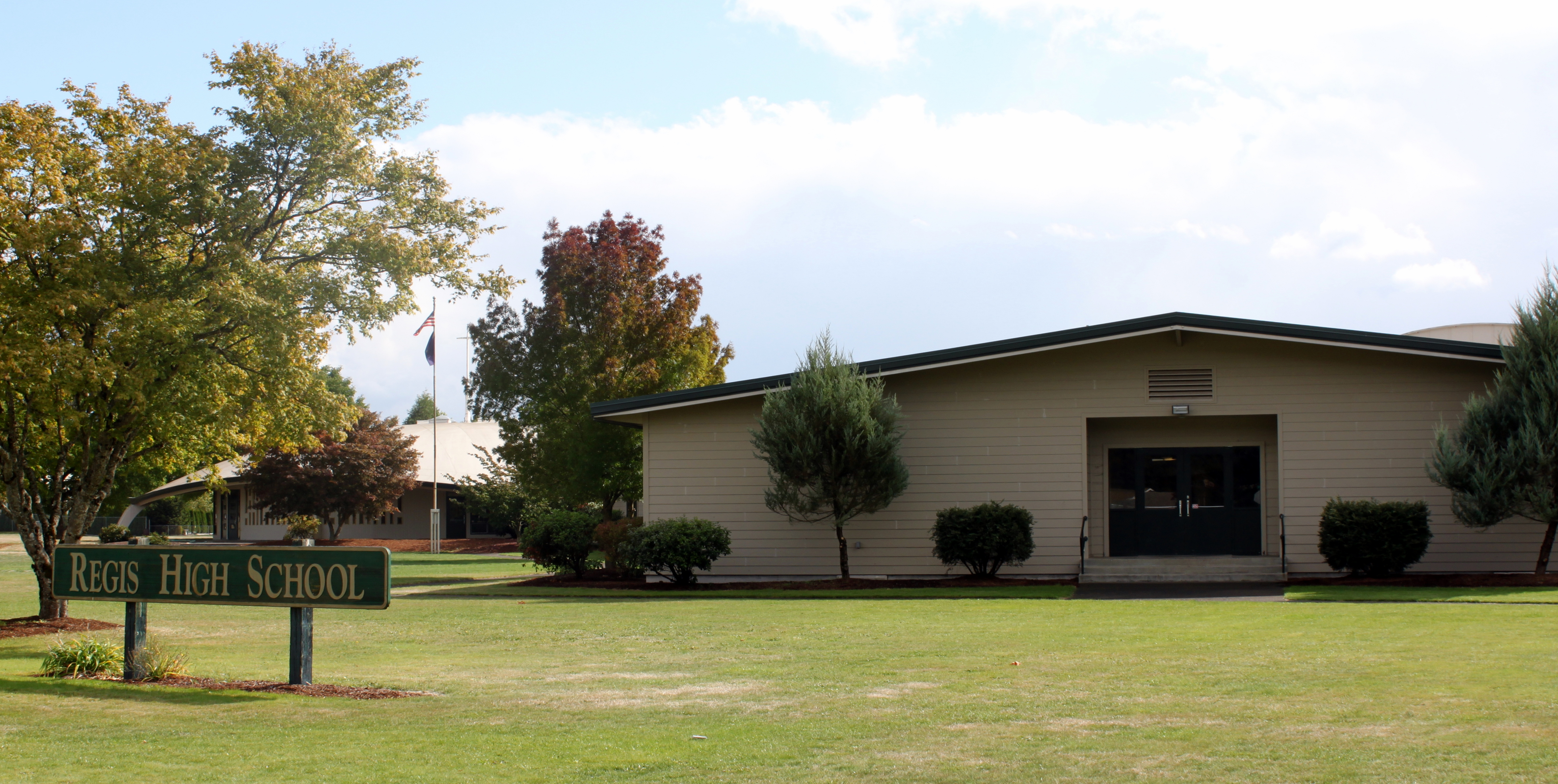
Entrance sign and buildings

Regis has been accredited through the Northwest Accreditation Commission since 1966.

== Notable alumni ==
- Travis Lulay football player
- Cliff Bentz Congressman
