= Bear Creek Secondary School =

Public high school in Barrie, Ontario, Canada

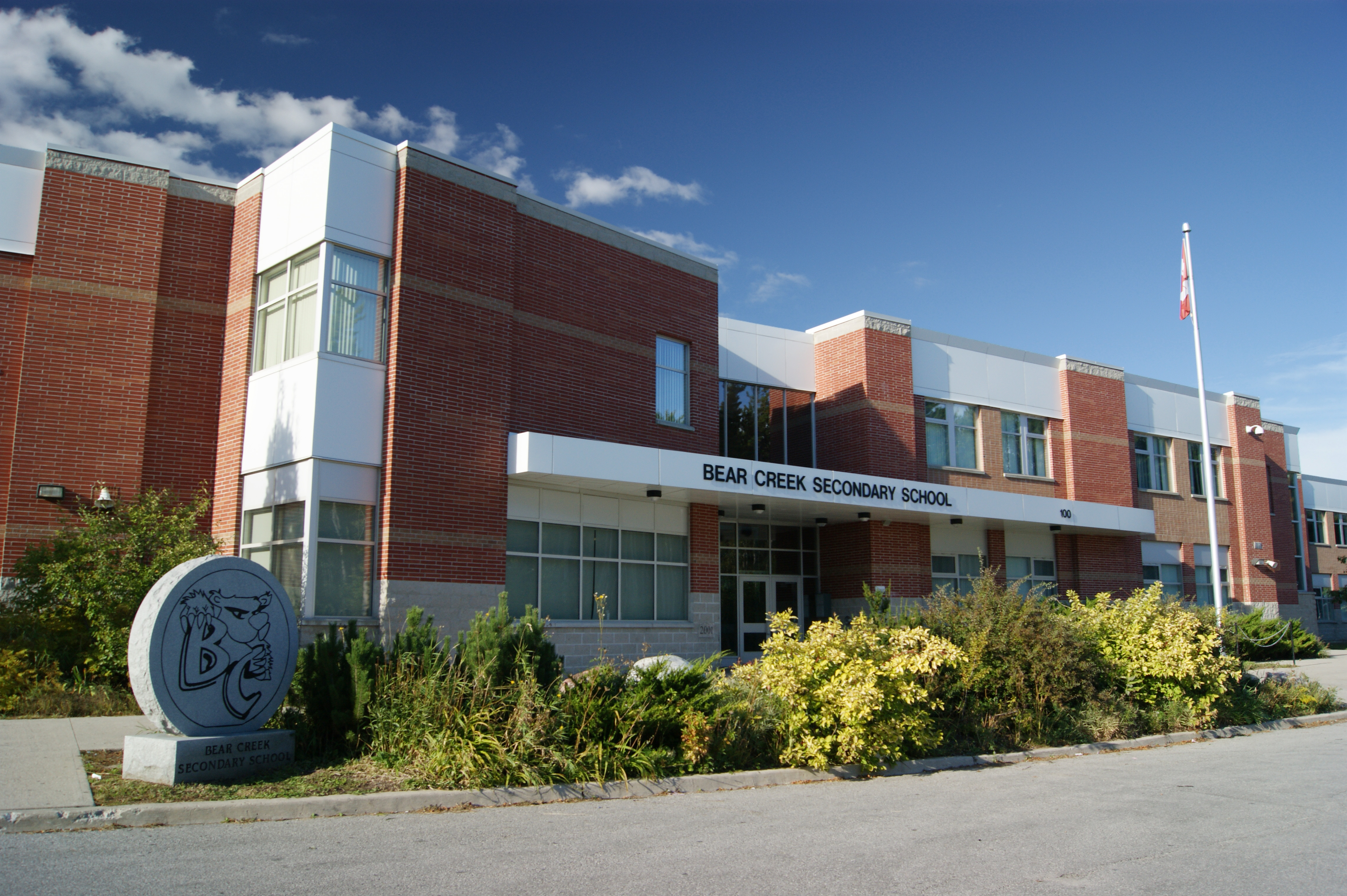
- Main entrance

Location
- 100 Red Oak Drive; Barrie, Ontario, L4N 9M5; Canada; 44°19′55″N 79°44′01″W

Information
- School type: Public
- Opened: 4 September 2001
- School board: SCDSB
- Superintendent: Kristen Fennell
- Area trustee: Kevin Berry
- School number: 894060
- Principal: Hailey Mclean
- Grades: 9 - 12
- Enrollment: 1533 (2020–21)
- Colour
- Nickname: Kodiaks
- Website: bss.scdsb.on.ca

Bear Creek Secondary School (also known as BCSS) is a public secondary school (grades 9-12) located in Barrie, Ontario, Canada. It was founded in 2001, it is the second largest high school in Simcoe County and currently has an enrollment of more than 1500 students. The current principal is Hailey Mclean. The school has an extremely large catchment area of mainly south & west Barrie, but also portions of Essa Township and Springwater Township.

== Facilities ==
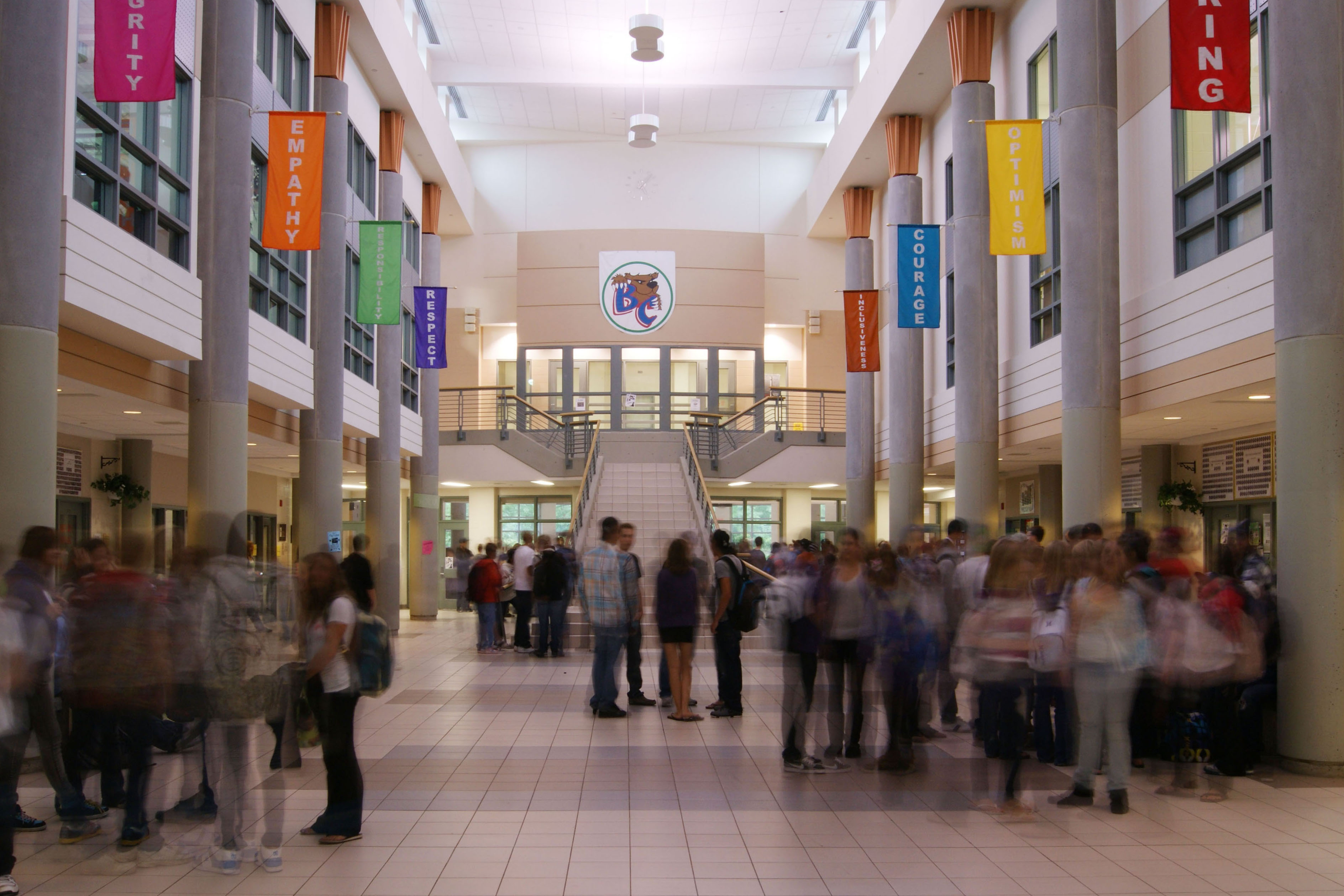
The School's Main Forum

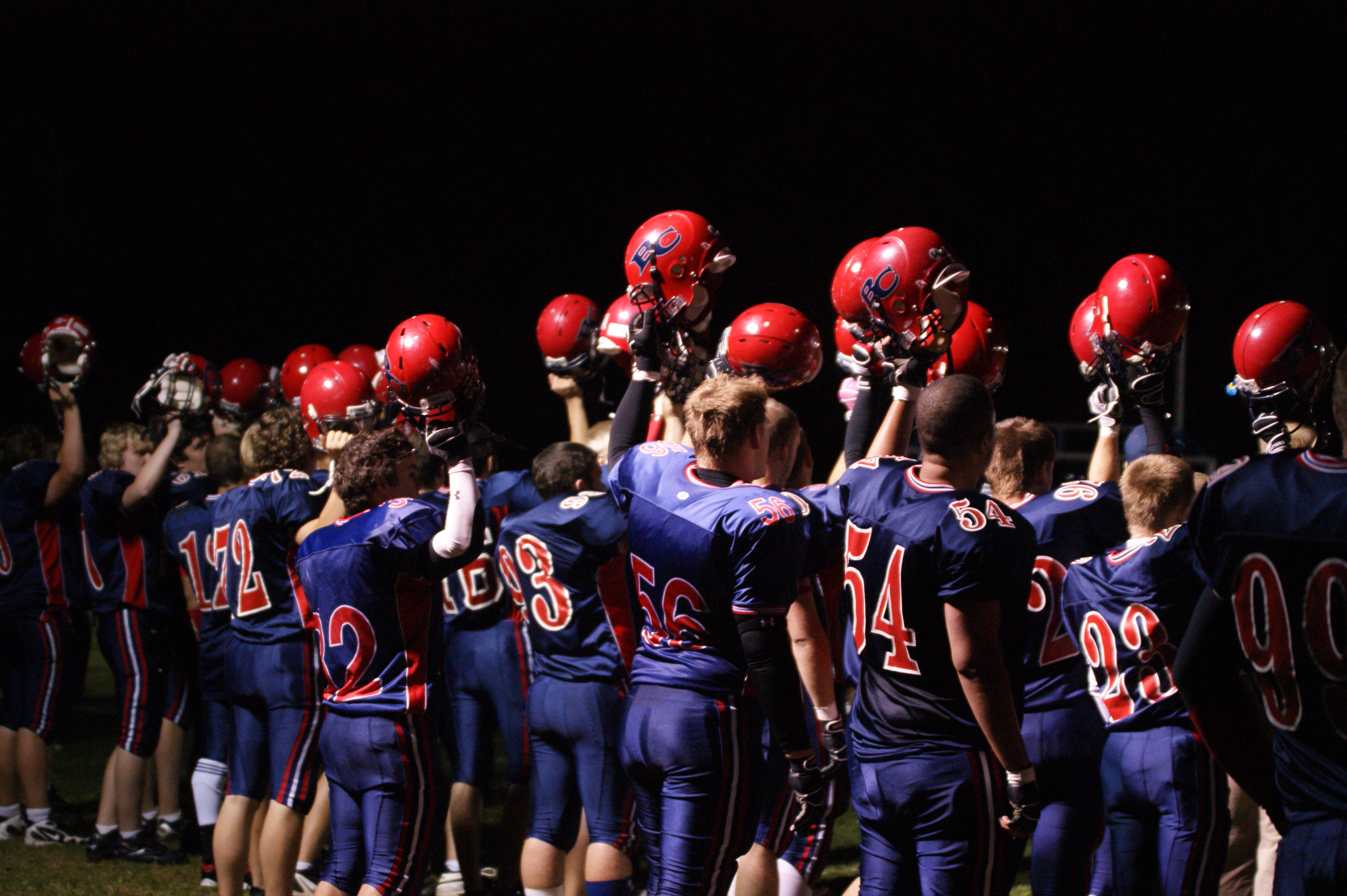
The Bear Creek boys' football team

The construction of Bear Creek was completed January 2001 by Bondfield Construction for the Simcoe County District School Board, costing CAD18,100,000. It was designed by Zawadzki Armin Stevens Architects. The two-storey school has an area of 167,570 square feet (15,568 m^{2}), and includes athletic facilities such as a gymnasium, exercise room, and a running track on the second floor. The school also features specialized classrooms, a round cafetorium, a food court area, and a large forum. Exterior features include a large parking area, an outdoor track and a large sports/football field. Nine years later, in 2010, a one-storey, 25,327 square feet (2,353.0 m^{2}) area expansion added six new classrooms, including two woodshops, a dance studio, and a hospitality suite, amongst other facilities. The CAD7.5 million expansion budget also covered renovations to the original part of the school.

== Notable faculty ==
- Lance Chomyc, former Toronto Argonaut and football record holder (In 1991, he set a record of 236 points)

== Notable alumni ==
- Daniel (Danny) Vandervoort — Edmonton Elks wide receiver; 2017 CFL draft 3rd overall

== See also ==
- Education in Ontario
- List of secondary schools in Ontario
