= 1955 Calgary Stampeders season =

Canadian football team season

- Head coach: Jack Hennemier
- Home stadium: Mewata Stadium

Results
- Record: 4–12
- Division place: 5th
- Playoffs: did not qualify

The 1955 Calgary Stampeders finished in fifth place in the W.I.F.U. with a 4–12 record and failed to make the playoffs.

== Regular season ==
=== Season standings ===
Western Interprovincial Football Union
Team	GP	W	L	T	PF	PA	Pts
Edmonton Eskimos	16	14	2	0	286	117	28
Saskatchewan Roughriders	16	10	6	0	270	245	20
Winnipeg Blue Bombers	16	7	9	0	210	195	14
BC Lions	16	5	11	0	211	330	10
Calgary Stampeders	16	4	12	0	209	299	8

=== Season schedule ===
Week	Game	Date	Opponent	Results		Venue	Attendance
Week	Game	Date	Opponent	Score	Record	Venue	Attendance
	1	Sat, Aug 20	vs. Edmonton Eskimos	L 10–13	0–1	Mewata Stadium	14,000
	2	Mon, Aug 22	at BC Lions	L 8–14	0–2	Empire Stadium	28,013
	3	Sat, Aug 27	vs. Saskatchewan Roughriders	L 12–29	0–3	Mewata Stadium	28,013
	4	Mon, Aug 29	at Winnipeg Blue Bombers	W 15–13	1–3	Winnipeg Stadium	15,499
	5	Mon, Sept 5	vs. Winnipeg Blue Bombers	W 12–9	2–3	Mewata Stadium	13,000
	6	Sat, Sept 10	at Saskatchewan Roughriders	L 23–24	2–4	Taylor Field	12,000
	7	Mon, Sept 12	at Edmonton Eskimos	L 12–24	2–5	Clarke Stadium	15,000
	8	Mon, Sept 19	vs. BC Lions	L 18–24	2–6	Mewata Stadium	11,000
	9	Sat, Sept 24	vs. Edmonton Eskimos	L 0–15	2–7	Mewata Stadium	10,000
	10	Mon, Sept 26	at Winnipeg Blue Bombers	L 6–25	2–8	Winnipeg Stadium	14,724
	11	Mon, Oct 3	vs. BC Lions	W 18–6	3–8	Mewata Stadium	12,000
	12	Sat, Oct 8	vs. Winnipeg Blue Bombers	L 12–13	3–9	Mewata Stadium	12,000
	13	Mon, Oct 10	at Saskatchewan Roughriders	L 16–18	3–10	Taylor Field	13,837
	14	Sat, Oct 15	at BC Lions	L 18–36	3–11	Empire Stadium	16,951
	15	Mon, Oct 24	vs. Saskatchewan Roughriders	W 24–6	4–11	Mewata Stadium	10,000
	16	Sat, Oct 29	at Edmonton Eskimos	L 5–30	4–12	Clarke Stadium	13,000

== Awards and records ==
- None
