= Jonathon Jennings =

American football player (born 1992)

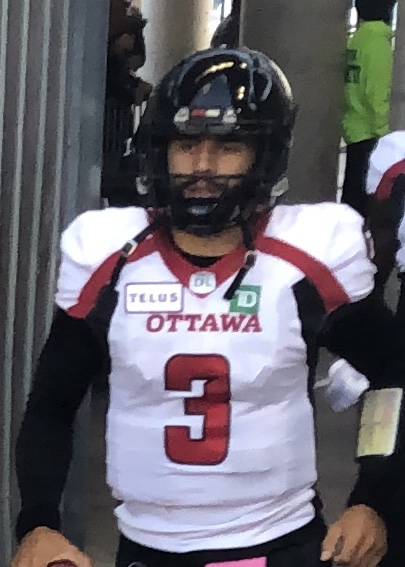
- Jennings before an Ottawa Redblacks game in 2019

No. 3
- Position: Quarterback

Personal information
- Born: July 21, 1992 (age 34); Columbus, Ohio, U.S.
- Listed height: 6 ft 0 in (1.83 m)
- Listed weight: 205 lb (93 kg)

Career information
- High school: Westerville South (Westerville, Ohio)
- College: Saginaw Valley State
- NFL draft: 2014: undrafted

Career history
- 2015–2018: BC Lions
- 2019: Ottawa Redblacks

Career NFL statistics
- Pass completions: 1,086
- Pass attempts: 1,637
- Percentage: 66.3
- TD–INT: 69–58
- Passing yards: 13,651
- Stats at CFL.ca

Jonathon Jennings (born July 21, 1992) is an American former professional football player who was a quarterback for the BC Lions and Ottawa Redblacks of the Canadian Football League (CFL). He played college football for the Saginaw Valley State Cardinals. Jennings made his professional debut for the Lions in 2015.

== Early life and college ==
Jennings played high school football and basketball at Westerville South High School, where he was a first team All-League player as a senior. From 2010 to 2013, he played for the Cardinals at Saginaw Valley State University, where he threw for 10,710 yards and 96 touchdowns at the Division II program. As a senior, Jennings threw for 3,824 yards for 30 touchdowns, additionally rushing for 470 yards and 12 touchdowns. He studied finance in college.

== Professional career ==
=== Early career ===
Jennings was eligible for the 2014 NFL draft, but went undrafted. He tried out with several National Football League (NFL) teams prior to the 2014 season, including the Kansas City Chiefs, the Detroit Lions, and the Green Bay Packers. He also tried out with the Saskatchewan Roughriders of the CFL in April 2014. Jennings was not signed by any NFL or CFL teams in 2014, and did not play football professionally that year.

=== BC Lions ===
In April 2015, Jennings was signed by the BC Lions of the CFL. He competed for the back-up quarterback position on the depth chart, which he received in the season opener. Jennings recorded his first statistic on July 17 against the Roughriders, where he rushed for one yard on a quarterback sneak. Due to injuries to starting quarterback Travis Lulay, Jennings played in eight regular season games, starting six, and started in the Lions' lone playoff game. Jennings completed 66% of his passing attempts for 2,004 yards with 15 touchdowns and 10 interceptions. In his second career start, Jennings also caught a 21 yard touchdown pass on a contested catch thrown into double coverage by receiver Austin Collie on a trick play against the Saskatchewan Roughriders. In March 2016, Lions GM and head coach Wally Buono announced that Jennings would enter training camp as the #1 quarterback on the depth chart (above veteran Lulay) and he hoped that Jennings would have earned that title by Week 1 of the 2016 regular season. On May 5, 2016, Jennings and the Lions agreed on a contract extension through the 2018 CFL season. Prior to signing the extension, Jennings would have become a free-agent following the 2016 campaign. Following a less than impressive 2017 season Jennings agreed to restructure his contract for the 2018 season; lowering his initial salary, but adding more on-the-field incentives. Jennings, who continued to struggle to start the 2018 season, was benched in favour of veteran Travis Lulay starting in Week 5. Lulay suffered a concussion and separated shoulder in consecutive weeks, opening the door for Jennings to start for the remainder of the regular season. Despite winning two of the following three games Jennings was once again relegated in favour of Lulay by Week 18. In late November, following the close of the season, Jennings informed the Lions that he would not be re-signing with the team, intending to become a free agent in February 2019.

=== Ottawa Redblacks ===
On February 13, 2019 Jennings agreed to a one-year contract with the Ottawa Redblacks for the 2019 season. Jennings began the season as the backup quarterback to Dominique Davis. Davis missed two games in July which elevated Jennings to the starting role. However, Jennings struggled in both outings, throwing for less than 200 yards combined with three interceptions and only one touchdown. In Week 11 Jennings came in relief of Davis after he threw three interceptions in the first quarter of the game: Jennings completed 16 of 26 pass attempts for 208 yards with one touchdown, but was unable to lead the Redblacks to victory. As Davis continued to struggle, and the Redblacks fell to 3-7, the team chose to name Jennings' as their starting quarterback in Week 13: Despite throwing for 327 yards Jennings and the Redblacks were defeated 46-17 by divisional rival Toronto Argonauts. Jennings was demoted to third stringer, and closed out the 3-15 Redblacks' season with a three rushing touchdown performance, but his passing statistics for the year were the worst of his career. He was released by the Redblacks on January 23, 2020.

== Career statistics ==
=== CFL ===
		Passing										Rushing
Year	Team	Games	Started	Record	Att	Comp	Pct	Yards	TD	Int	Rating	Att	Yards	Avg	Long	TD
2015	BC	18	6	3–3	215	142	66.0	2,004	15	10	99.8	26	127	4.9	17	0
2016	BC	18	18	12–6	554	371	67.0	5,226	27	15	102.1	68	363	5.3	20	4
2017	BC	18	14	4–10	466	306	65.7	3,639	16	19	83.8	55	267	4.9	27	2
2018	BC	18	6	3–3	239	161	67.3	1,628	8	7	85.6	36	226	6.3	33	0
2019	OTT	18	6	0–6	163	106	65.0	1,154	3	7	74.0	29	102	3.5	13	3
CFL totals		90	50	22–28	1,637	1,086	66.3	13,651	69	58	91.4	214	1,085	5.1	33	9

=== College ===
Season	Team	GP	Passing						Rushing			
Season	Team	GP	Cmp	Att	Yds	TD	Int	Rate	Att	Yds	Avg	TD
2010	Saginaw Valley State	9	99	168	1,064	9	8	120.3	60	111	1.9	1
2011	Saginaw Valley State	11	210	309	2,924	29	9	172.6	91	416	4.6	7
2012	Saginaw Valley State	11	270	420	3,282	27	10	146.4	82	291	3.5	6
2013	Saginaw Valley State	12	220	340	3,440	31	11	173.3	110	527	4.8	12
Career		43	799	1,237	10,710	96	38	156.8	343	1,345	3.9	26
