= Roy Dewalt =

American gridiron football player (born 1956)

Profile
- Position: Quarterback

Personal information
- Born: September 4, 1956 (age 70); Houston, Texas, U.S.

Career information
- College: UT Arlington
- NFL draft: 1980: 9th round, 236th overall pick

Career history
- BC Lions (1980–1987); Winnipeg Blue Bombers (1988); Ottawa Rough Riders (1988)

Awards and highlights
- Grey Cup champion (1985); Grey Cup MVP (1985); CFL West All-Star (1987)

Roy Dewalt (born September 4, 1956) is an American former professional football quarterback who played in the Canadian Football League (CFL) from 1980 to 1988. He played for the BC Lions between 1980 and 1987, and the Winnipeg Blue Bombers and Ottawa Rough Riders in 1988. He led the Lions to their second Grey Cup championship in 1985 and was named the Grey Cup Most Valuable Player on offence.

== Professional career ==
Dewalt joined the Lions in 1980 after being originally drafted out of Texas-Arlington as a running back by the Cleveland Browns in the ninth round of the NFL draft that season, and served as the back-up quarterback to Joe "the Throwin' Samoan" Paopao for two seasons. In 1982, he succeeded Paopao, which coincided with the arrival of Mervyn Fernandez who became Dewalt's favourite target. The next season Dewalt helped to lead the team to first place in the CFL Western Division, with an 11-5-0 record, and to its first Grey Cup appearance since 1964. However, they lost to the Toronto Argonauts, 18 to 17. In 1984, despite a first place record of 12-3-1, the Lions lost the West championship to the Blue Bombers. However, in 1985 the Lions came back with a 13-3-0 record, again first in the West, and a 37-24 Grey Cup victory over the Hamilton Tiger-Cats.

Although in 1985 Dewalt completed 301 out of 476 pass attempts for 4,237 yards and 27 touchdowns to 12 interceptions, his best season, he was not chosen as the division's all-star quarterback. That honour went to Matt Dunigan of the Edmonton Eskimos.

For the next two seasons Dewalt was not as effective of a quarterback, in part due to an injury to Fernandez in 1985 and the receiver's departure for the Los Angeles Raiders in 1986. In 1988, he was allowed to sign with the Winnipeg Blue Bombers after the Lions replaced him with Matt Dunigan. An arm injury led Dewalt to a number of poor performances and he was sent packing to the Ottawa Rough Riders where, overall, his play did not improve. He retired from pro football after the season.
