= Joe Paopao =

Professional Canadian football coach

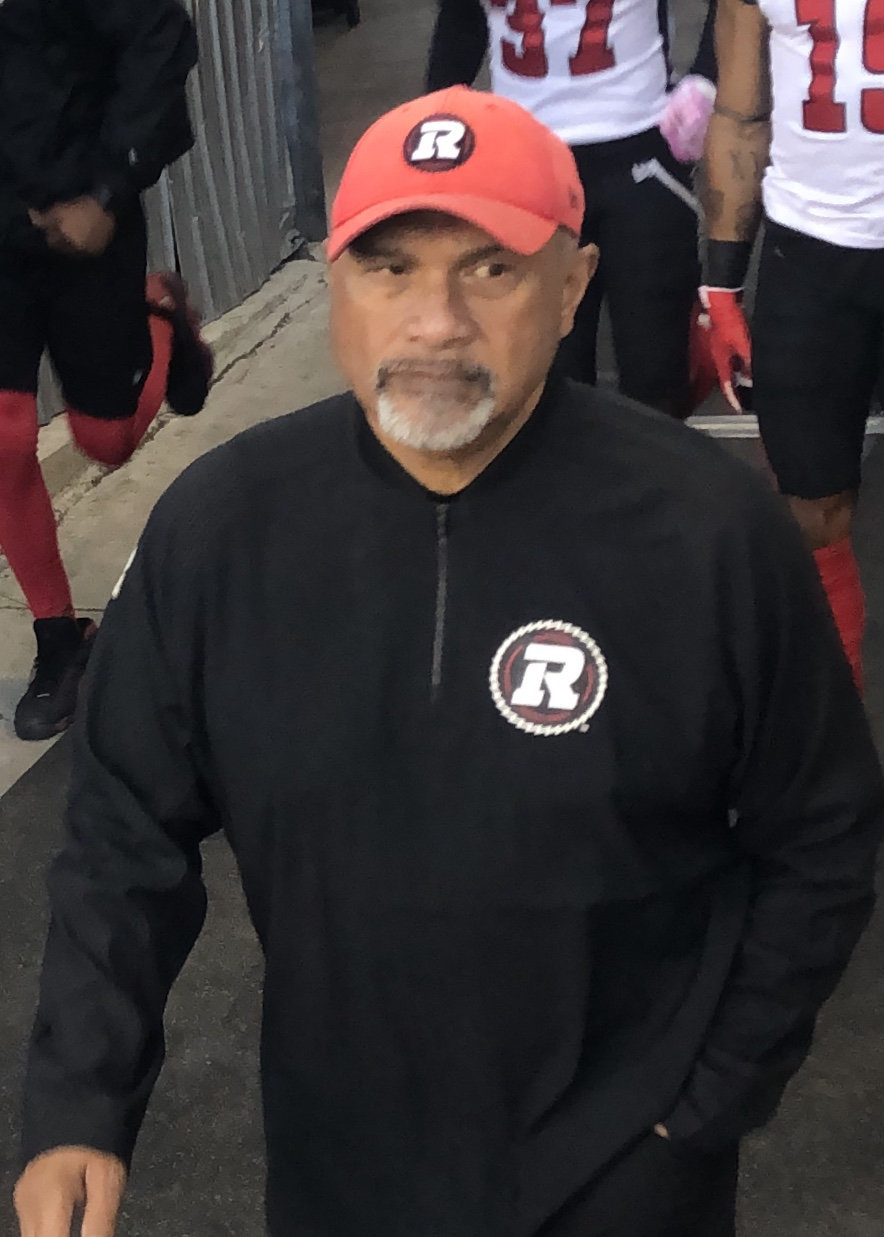
- Paopao before an Ottawa Redblacks game in 2019

Profile
- Position: Quarterback

Personal information
- Born: June 30, 1955 (age 71); Honolulu, Hawaii, U.S.
- Listed height: 6 ft 1 in (1.85 m)
- Listed weight: 200 lb (91 kg)

Career information
- College: Long Beach State

Career history

Playing
- 1978–1983: BC Lions
- 1984–1986: Saskatchewan Roughriders
- 1987: Ottawa Rough Riders
- 1990: BC Lions

Coaching
- 1989: BC Lions (OBC)
- 1991: BC Lions (QC)
- 1992–1993: BC Lions (OC)
- 1994–1995: Edmonton Eskimos (OC)
- 1996: BC Lions (HC)
- 1997–1998: Winnipeg Blue Bombers (OC)
- 1999–2000: BC Lions (OC)
- 2001: San Francisco Demons (OC)
- 2002–2005: Ottawa Renegades (HC)
- 2006: Hamilton Tiger-Cats (OC)
- 2007–2011: Waterloo Warriors (OC)
- 2012–2013: Waterloo Warriors (HC)
- 2014: BC Lions (RC)
- 2015–2018: Simon Fraser Clan football (OC)
- 2019: Ottawa Redblacks (RB, QB)

Joe Paopao (born June 30, 1955) is an American former professional football quarterback and coach in the Canadian Football League (CFL). Paopao played 11 seasons in the CFL and was a member of the BC Lions, Saskatchewan Roughriders, and the Ottawa Rough Riders. He began his coaching career with the Lions and has coached with six CFL organizations, including stints as head coach with the Lions in 1996 and the Ottawa Renegades from 2002 to 2005.

== Professional playing career ==
Paopao began his CFL career as a quarterback for the BC Lions in 1978. He was nicknamed the "Throwin' Samoan" for his great ability to pass, as he led the Lions in passing for the next three seasons and set a CFL record in 1979 for pass completions in a single game. By 1983, he had lost the starting job to Roy Dewalt. In 1984 he signed with the Saskatchewan Roughriders and again led that team in passing. He was traded to the Ottawa Rough Riders in 1987, and the following year to the Winnipeg Blue Bombers. That year, he was named the offensive backfield coach of the BC Lions, thus beginning his CFL coaching career. The next year however, he went back to his old position of quarterback for the Lions, backing up Doug Flutie, in his last season.

== Coaching career ==
=== Early CFL coaching career ===
In 1991, Paopao was made the quarterback coach of the Lions. In 1992 he was promoted to offensive coordinator. Paopao was with the Lions for four seasons to begin his coaching career. Paopao then left to be the offensive coordinator for the Edmonton Eskimos in 1994. In 1996 Paopao returned to BC to be the head coach, but he only managed to win 5 games and lost 13 during his only season as the Lions head coach. Following his first stint as a head coach Paopao was hired by the Blue Bombers as the team's offensive coordinator, a position which he held for two seasons. He once again returned to the Lions in 1999 and as the offensive coordinator and assistant head coach.

=== San Francisco Demons ===
Paopao was hired as the offensive coordinator for the San Francisco Demons of the XFL. The league was operational for only one season, and thus Paopao was once again looking for work.

=== Ottawa ===
In 2001 Paopao was hired as the head coach of the new Ottawa Renegades franchise where he coached for four seasons from 2002-2005. However, the Renegades struggled, winning only 23 games and losing 49, the team folded following the 2005 season. Paopao was then hired by the Hamilton Tiger-Cats and named offensive coordinator for the 2006 season. He was later relieved of his duties with the Tiger-Cats on August 28, 2006.

=== University of Waterloo ===
Paopao joined the University of Waterloo Warriors as the team's offensive coordinator and assistant head coach in 2007, a position he would hold for five years. He was named the team's interim head coach for the 2012 season after Dennis McPhee's resignation, and then full-time head coach in February 2013. In two seasons with the Warriors, Paopao had a 3-13 record.

=== Return to BC ===
On February 6, 2014, the BC Lions announced Paopao would be re-joining the organization as its receivers coach.

=== Simon Fraser University ===
On March 27, 2015 Joe Paopao was named offensive coordinator of the Simon Fraser University Clan football team in the NCAA's Division II Great Northwest Athletic Conference.

=== Return to Ottawa ===
On April 15, 2019 Paopao was hired by the Ottawa Redblacks as a running backs coach. Midway through the 2019 season, with the offense sputtering and the team having lost six of their last seven matches, head coach Rick Campbell turned over the role of offensive play-calling to Paopao: His responsibilities with the team also changed from running backs coach to quarterbacks coach. Following a head coaching change, Paopao was not retained by the Redblacks for the 2020 season.

== Personal life ==
Paopao is a longtime resident of Oceanside, California. He was added to the BC Lions Wall of Fame in 2007. He is the uncle of current Washington Huskies special teams coordinator and tight ends coach, Jordan Paopao.

== CFL coaching record ==
| Team | Year | Regular season | | | | | Postseason | | |
| Team | Year | Won | Lost | Ties | Win % | Finish | Won | Lost | Result |
|---|---|---|---|---|---|---|---|---|---|
| BC | 1996 | 5 | 13 | 0 | .278 | 5th in West Division | – | – | Missed playoffs |
| BC total | | 5 | 13 | 0 | .278 | 0 West Division; Championships | 0 | 0 | 0 Grey Cups |
| OTT | 2002 | 4 | 14 | 0 | .222 | 4th in East Division | – | – | Missed playoffs |
| OTT | 2003 | 7 | 11 | 0 | .389 | 3rd in East Division | – | – | Missed playoffs |
| OTT | 2004 | 5 | 13 | 0 | .278 | 4th in East Division | – | – | Missed playoffs |
| OTT | 2005 | 7 | 11 | 0 | .389 | 3rd in East Division | – | – | Missed playoffs |
| OTT total | | 23 | 49 | 0 | .319 | 0 East Division; Championships | 0 | 0 | 0 Grey Cups |
| Total | | 28 | 62 | 0 | .311 | 0 Division; Championships | 0 | 0 | 0 Grey Cups |

== CIS coaching record ==
| Team | Year | Regular season | | | | | Postseason | | |
| Team | Year | Won | Lost | Ties | Win % | Finish | Won | Lost | Result |
|---|---|---|---|---|---|---|---|---|---|
| Waterloo | 2012 | 2 | 6 | 0 | .250 | 7th in OUA Division | – | – | Missed playoffs |
| Waterloo | 2013 | 1 | 7 | 0 | .125 | 9th in OUA Division | – | – | Missed playoffs |
| Total | | 3 | 13 | 0 | .188 | 0 OUA Division; Championships | 0 | 0 | 0 Vanier Cups |

== See also ==
- List of University of Waterloo people
