= Travis Lulay =

American football player (born 1983)

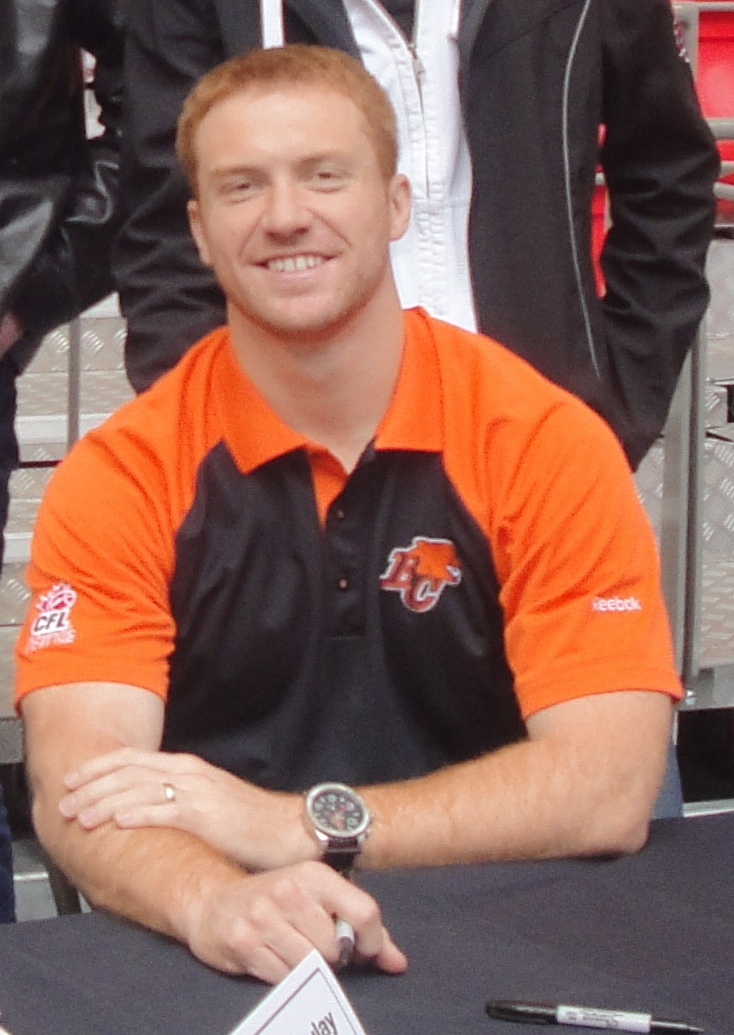
- Lulay with the BC Lions in 2012

No. 7, 14
- Position: Quarterback

Personal information
- Born: September 27, 1983 (age 43); Aumsville, Oregon, U.S.
- Listed height: 6 ft 2 in (1.88 m)
- Listed weight: 216 lb (98 kg)

Career information
- High school: Regis (Stayton, Oregon)
- College: Montana State
- NFL draft: 2006: undrafted

Career history
- Seattle Seahawks (2006–2007)*; → Berlin Thunder (2007); New Orleans Saints (2008)*; Seattle Seahawks (2008)*; BC Lions (2009–2018)
- * Offseason or practice squad member only

Awards and highlights
- Grey Cup champion (2011); Grey Cup Most Valuable Player (2011); CFL's Most Outstanding Player (2011); Jeff Nicklin Memorial Trophy (2011); CFL All-Star (2011); 2× CFL West All-Star (2011, 2012)
- Stats at CFL.ca

Travis Jacob Lulay (born September 27, 1983) is an American former professional football quarterback who played for the BC Lions of the Canadian Football League (CFL) from 2009 to 2018. In his first season as a full-time starter, Lulay won the CFL's Most Outstanding Player Award in 2011 and was named the Most Valuable Player of the 2011 Grey Cup. He played college football for the Montana State Bobcats. Prior to joining the Lions, Lulay was a member of the Seattle Seahawks, Berlin Thunder and New Orleans Saints.

== Early life ==
Travis Jacob Lulay was born on September 27, 1983, in Aumsville, Oregon. He attended Regis High School in Stayton, Oregon.

== College career ==
Lulay led Montana State in rushing his senior year with 611 yards. He left with school records for career passing yards (10,746-11th in NCAA Division I-AA history), single-season total offense, and total offense in a career, and in his four years led the Bobcats to three victories over their state rivals, the University of Montana Grizzlies. In 2005, while playing at Montana State University – Bozeman he completed 223 passes in 388 attempts for 2,629 yards. His passing percentage was 57.5%. He threw for 17 passing TD's and 10 INT's. His quarterback rating was 123.7. He graduated with a GPA of 3.91.

== Professional career ==
At the NFL Combine in 2006, Lulay came in first in the short shuttle drill and ranked among the top three quarterbacks in the three cone, broad jump and vertical jump.

=== Seattle Seahawks (first stint) ===
After going undrafted, Lulay signed with the Seattle Seahawks on May 1, 2006, but was released during final cuts in September. He was re-signed by the Seahawks on January 4, 2007, and was assigned to the Berlin Thunder of NFL Europa. He was waived on April 8, 2008.

=== New Orleans Saints ===
On May 14, 2008, Lulay signed with the New Orleans Saints. He was waived on July 18.

=== Seattle Seahawks (second stint) ===
On October 10, 2008, the Seattle Seahawks re-signed Lulay to their practice squad. He was released again on December 3, 2008.

=== BC Lions ===
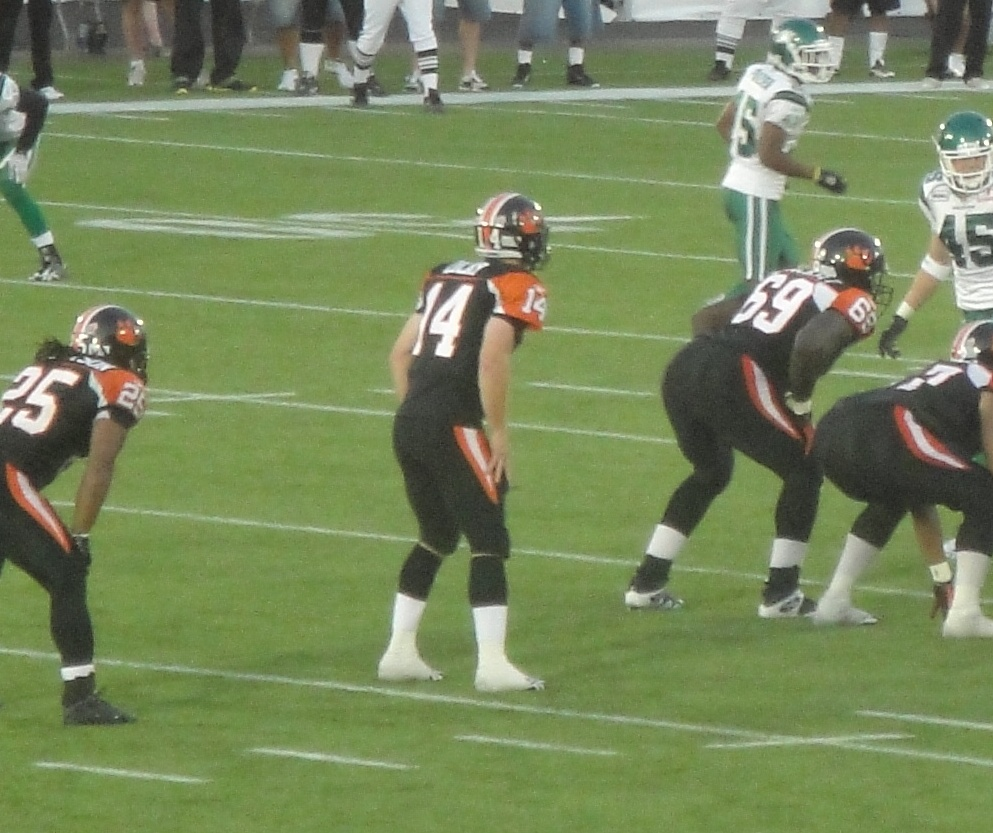
Lulay (14) in the 2010 home opener.

Lulay signed with the BC Lions on May 20, 2009, and impressed the coaching staff enough in training camp to insert him in the second pre-season game for three series, where he completed 8 of 10 passes for 140 yards with one touchdown and one interception. He saw limited action in the regular season as the Lions used a total of five different quarterbacks due to injuries.

In 2010, Lulay made his first professional start in the fourth game of the season against Toronto following injuries to starter Casey Printers and was expected to lead the Lions until Printers was ready to make his return to the lineup. However, Lulay was replaced by Jarious Jackson during the fourth quarter of the August 7th game against Calgary and also started the following game against Saskatchewan. Printers returned for the next game and won three out of the five games he started, but due to his turnover-filled back-to-back performances, he was replaced with Lulay as the starter in Game 13 against Winnipeg, which the Lions won. After Lulay had a minor injury in the following game, again against Winnipeg, Printers came into the game to protect a 21-point lead. The Blue Bombers stormed back to tie the game and force overtime, which was decided by Printers' game-clinching interception. It was Casey's last game with the Lions as Buono released him soon after the game. Consequently, Lulay became the undisputed starting quarterback, finishing the season 4–5 as a starter.

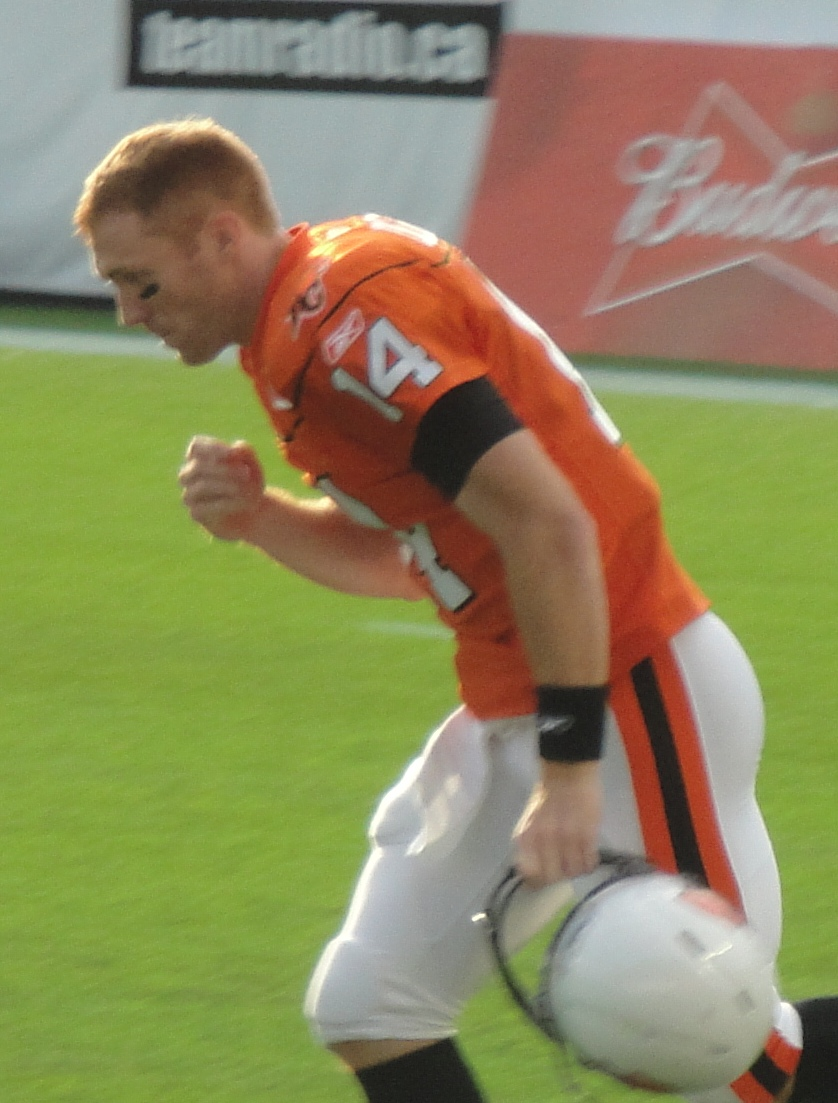
Lulay in a 2011 season home game

The Lions got off to a slow start, losing their first five games of the season and falling into last place in the league. The Lions stopped their five-game losing skid in week 6, defeating the Saskatchewan Roughriders, 24–11. In the following game against the Winnipeg Blue Bombers Travis Lulay struggled and was replaced in the third quarter by Jarious Jackson. Following the loss to the Bombers, the Lions then went on to win eight games in a row, as not only Lulay but the team as a whole played much better football. Lulay earned CFL Offensive Player of the Week Honours during weeks 10 and 18 and earned CFL Offensive Player of the Month for October. The Lions won the final two games of the regular season to finish with a record of 11–7, but more importantly they earned 1st place in the Western Conference. Lulay was named the 2011 CFL's Most Outstanding Player. In the Western Conference Finals game, Lulay threw for almost 300 yards as the Lions disposed of the Edmonton Eskimos and advanced to the Grey Cup Final which was held in BC Place. On November 28, 2011, Lulay and the BC Lions defeated the Winnipeg Blue Bombers in front of over 50,000 fans. Lulay threw for 320 yards and two touchdowns and was named the Grey Cup Most Valuable Player.

In 2012, Lulay had another strong season, leading the Lions to another first-place finish and a berth in the West Final. Despite playing in just 16 games, he set career highs for completions, completion percentage and passer rating. Lulay also spent much of the season chasing history, as he was approaching the record for most consecutive games played with at least one touchdown pass. In the 15th game of the season, he extended the streak to 26 games, but injured his shoulder and did not play in the next game. Because he dressed in the game, by CFL rules, the streak ended. However, the CFL amended the rules and declared the streak intact since he did not play in the next two games. Lulay played in the last game of the season, but only for 18 minutes, and did not throw for a touchdown, ending his streak at 26 games, second only to Sam Etcheverry's 34. Lulay was named the CFL's offensive player of the week for week 12 and the offensive player of the month for September. For the second consecutive season, he was the Lions' nominee for the CFL's Most Outstanding Player Award. The Lions' hopes of repeating as Grey Cup champions ended in the West Final where they lost to the Calgary Stampeders. Lulay completed 33 of 46 passes for 274 yards and one touchdown, but it was not enough as the Lions lost, 34–29.

In January 2013, it was reported that Lulay signed a two-year contract extension worth a reported $450,000 per season. In Week 12 of the 2013 regular season Lulay suffered an injury to his throwing shoulder when he impacted Alouettes defensive back Geoff Tisdale on a 19-yard rushing touchdown. The touchdown put the Lions up 29–7 with less than 9 minutes in the fourth quarter. The Lions ultimately won the game and opened the season with a record of 7–4. Lulay missed the next six games for the Lions; in that span they went 3–3. He returned to action in the last regular season game of 2013, but he only played for a limited amount of time, attempting only 4 passes, completing 3 of them for 54 yards. The Lions qualified for the playoffs as the 3rd seed in the West Division with a record of 11–7. Lulay started the playoff game against the Roughriders. He completed 20 of 26 pass attempts for 211 yards with no touchdowns or interceptions. He also ran the ball 5 times for 60 yards. Nonetheless, the Lions were defeated by Saskatchewan 29–25, thus ending their 2013 season.

In November 2013 Lulay underwent shoulder surgery to repair the damage done from his September injury. Lulay missed the first half of the 2014 CFL season while he rehabilitated his throwing shoulder. During that time Kevin Glenn led the Lions to a record of 5–4. After playing briefly in Week 9, Lulay returned to start for BC in Week 11, following their first bye week. Lulay completed 18 of 27 passes for 167 yards in a game dominated by the defense, but left with just under a minute to go in regular, his shoulder causing him extreme discomfort, 357 days since his last start. Lulay would not return to the field for the remainder of the 2014 season.

Lulay was again injured in Week 11 of the 2015 CFL season; suffering a torn MCL in the game against the Montreal Alouettes. Due to the emergence of rookie quarterback Jonathon Jennings during his absence, Lulay became the backup quarterback when he returned from injury. On February 8, 2016, Lulay resigned with the Lions on a two-year contract. Lulay spent the 2016 CFL season as the Lions' backup quarterback, behind Jennings.

On July 15, 2017, during a Week 4 match against the Hamilton Tiger-Cats, Lulay set a new CFL record for most passing yards when coming off the bench. He threw 436 passing yards (a career-high) after replacing Jennings who left the game due to injury, helping the Lions win the game 41–26. Lulay started the next three games for the Lions, winning two of them, before a suffering a minor shoulder injury, which coincided with Jonathon Jennings' return to health in Week 8. Nevertheless, Jennings struggled in the next three games, resulting in Lulay being forced into action in all three matches (all of which were losses). With Lulay having greatly outplayed Jennings head coach Wally Buono announced Lulay as the starter for the team's Week 12 match against Montreal. However, Lulay suffered a non-contact injury to his knee early in the game and did not return. On September 12, 2017, the Lions announced that Lulay would miss the remainder of the season with a torn ACL, which required surgery and minor damage to his MCL, which did not require surgery.

On February 12, 2018, one day before the start of free agency, Lulay and the Lions agreed to a one-year contract extension. On July 13, 2018, the Lions announced that Lulay would be the team's starting quarterback in their Week 5 match against the Blue Bombers. Incumbent starting quarterback Jonathon Jennings, who struggled in 2017, continued his poor play into the early weeks of the 2018 season. Lulay started and finished the following six games for the Lions, winning twice. He suffered a concussion in Week 13 against the Redblacks. Then the following week was knocked out of the contest in the first quarter after suffering a separated shoulder. In the days following the Lions announced they expected Lulay to miss four to six weeks recovering. The Lions revealed that Lulay would return from injury in time for the team's Week 18 match against the Calgary Stampeders. In the off-season the Lions brought in All-Star Mike Reilly to be the starting quarterback. As a free agent Lulay received multiple offers from other teams looking to sign him to a contract, however on February 28, 2019, he ultimately decided it was time to retire from professional sports.

== Career statistics ==
=== CFL ===
		Passing									Rushing
Year	Team	GA	GS	Att	Comp	Pct	Yards	TD	Int	Rating	Att	Yards	Avg	Long	TD	Fumb
2009	BC	15	0	36	22	61.1	324	2	2	85.9	17	133	7.8	30	0	0
2010	BC	18	9	318	205	64.5	2,602	9	11	84.9	62	396	6.4	20	4	8
2011	BC	18	18	583	342	58.7	4,815	32	11	95.8	47	391	8.3	53	3	1
2012	BC	18	16	520	346	66.5	4,231	27	10	100.7	65	477	7.3	43	3	3
2013	BC	12	11	347	224	64.6	2,841	19	11	95.0	41	287	7.0	23	3	6
2014	BC	4	1	35	22	62.9	194	0	0	77.6	6	54	9.0	24	0	1
2015	BC	14	10	266	167	62.8	1,953	12	10	84.4	20	166	8.3	40	0	1
2016	BC	18	0	32	22	68.8	205	2	2	80.9	16	27	1.7	8	6	0
2017	BC	11	4	165	121	73.3	1,693	10	7	108.5	31	145	4.7	17	5	1
2018	BC	12	12	311	187	60.1	2,494	13	11	84.8	10	72	7.2	12	0	4
CFL totals		140	81	2,613	1,658	63.5	21,352	127	75	93.2	315	2,148	6.8	53	24	25

=== College ===
Year	Passing
Year	Att	Comp	Yds	TD	Int
2002	272	157	2,042	14	5
2003	406	238	2,568	12	11
2004	490	269	3,485	15	9
2005	338	223	2,629	17	10
Total	1,506	887	10,724	58	35
