= Casey Printers =

American gridiron football player (born 1981)

No. 4, 1
- Position: Quarterback

Personal information
- Born: May 16, 1981 (age 45); DeSoto, Texas, U.S.
- Listed height: 6 ft 2 in (1.88 m)
- Listed weight: 216 lb (98 kg)

Career information
- High school: DeSoto
- College: TCU (1999–2001); Florida A&M (2002)

Career history
- 2003–2005: BC Lions
- 2006: Kansas City Chiefs
- 2007–2008: Hamilton Tiger-Cats
- 2009–2010: BC Lions
- 2012: Allen Wranglers

Awards and highlights
- CFL Most Outstanding Player (2004); Jeff Nicklin Memorial Trophy (2004); CFL All-Star (2004); CFL West All-Star (2004); CFL passing touchdowns leader (2004)
- Stats at CFL.ca (archive)

Casey J. Printers (born May 16, 1981) is an American former professional football quarterback who played in the Canadian Football League (CFL) with the BC Lions and Hamilton Tiger-Cats. He played college football at TCU and Florida A&M.

== Early life ==
Born in DeSoto, Texas, Printers played football from a young age, a highlight being a trip to the Pop Warner National Championship in San Francisco, California with his team, the Oak Cliff Jets, when he was twelve years old.

== College career ==
Printers played collegiately at Texas Christian University from 1999 to 2001, leading the TCU Horned Frogs to back-to-back Western Athletic Conference championships in 1999 and 2000 and three straight bowl games, including back-to-back appearances in the Mobile Alabama Bowl in 1999 and 2000. Printers was named Most Valuable Player in the Frogs' 1999 bowl victory and was subsequently named Freshman of the Year for 1999 by the Dallas Morning News and third-team Freshman All-American by The Sporting News. In 2000, he received honorable mention as an All-WAC Conference Selection. The 1999 and 2000 Horned Frogs, coached by Dennis Franchione, also featured Heisman Trophy candidate and future NFL star LaDainian Tomlinson at running back. In 2001, Printers led the Horned Frogs to a 6–6 record and an appearance in the galleryfurniture.com Bowl, where Printers was 15–30 for 144 yards and 4 interceptions in the 28–9 loss. Printers' 4,621 passing yards and 37 touchdown passes each rank fourth in TCU history. Branding himself the "Best Kept Secret in College Football", Printers transferred to Florida A&M for his senior year (2002), where he led the Rattlers to a 7–5 record, completing 123 of 218 passes for 1,517 yards with 12 touchdowns and 5 interceptions and rushing for 3 touchdowns.

== Professional career ==
=== BC Lions (first stint) ===
After going undrafted in the 2002 NFL draft, Printers joined the BC Lions for the 2003 CFL season on a three-year contract as their third-string quarterback, and saw little playing time, attempting only two passes. During the 2004 season, he unseated Spergon Wynn as backup quarterback and replaced starter Dave Dickenson when Dickenson went down with an injury. After completing 325 of 494 pass attempts for 5,088 yards and 35 touchdowns with 10 interceptions and rushing for 469 yards and 9 touchdowns, he was named the Most Outstanding Player of the 2004 season, becoming known as a dynamic quarterback able to improvise and make big plays both passing and rushing. He played a key role in the Lions' eight-game winning streak, 13–5 record, and first-place finish in the West Division standings. His 35 passing touchdowns and 10.3 yards-per-pass average led the league; he tied Edmonton's Jason Maas for a league-best 65.8 completion percentage, and his rushing stats were best among QBs.

In the 2004 West Division Final against the Saskatchewan Roughriders, Printers was forced to leave the game with a shoulder injury in the fourth quarter, with the score tied 14–14. Dickenson, having recovered from knee surgery and shared quarterbacking duties with Printers late in the season, played the rest of the game and threw a touchdown pass in the Lions' 27–25 overtime victory. Dickenson would start and play the entire 2004 Grey Cup game against the Toronto Argonauts, which the Lions lost by a score of 27–19.

Printers had surgery on his right hallux in the 2004–2005 offseason, and turned down a three-year, $1 million contract extension from the Lions. With Printers recovering, Dickenson won the starting job and led the team to an 11–0 start. Printers took over as starter after Dickenson was injured in the 13th game. After the 11–0 start, the Lions lost six of their last seven regular season games, including the regular season finale against the Roughriders, in which Dickenson returned and replaced Printers in the second half. Dickenson started and played all but the last three minutes of the 2005 West Division Final against the Edmonton Eskimos, which the Lions lost 28–23.

Throughout the 2005 season Printers was embroiled in a quarterback controversy with Dickenson over who should start as pivot and was nagged by shoulder and toe injuries. Ultimately, Printers saw relatively little playing time, completing 131 of 216 pass attempts for 1671 yards, 9 touchdowns and 6 interceptions, with 336 yards rushing and 2 rushing TDs. In January 2006, he turned down a three-year, $1.2 million (CAD) offer from the Lions, opting to sign a three-year, $1.03 million (USD) deal with the Kansas City Chiefs.

=== Kansas City Chiefs ===
Printers was expected to compete with Chiefs 2006 draft pick Brodie Croyle for a backup quarterback position, but struggled in his preseason debut in the second quarter of an August 12, 2006 game against the Houston Texans at Reliant Stadium. In limited action in the Chiefs' four pre-season games, Printers completed 12 of 23 pass attempts for 109 yards with one interception and rushed 5 times for 20 yards. He was cut by the Kansas City Chiefs on September 2, 2006, prior to the start of the regular season. He was signed to the Chiefs' practice squad on September 4, 2006. On October 28, 2006, he was signed to the Chiefs' 53-man roster. After being demoted to the practice roster once again, he travelled to Vancouver and attended the November 12 BC Lions West Division Final playoff game against the Saskatchewan Roughriders at BC Place, but was barred from the sidelines by Lions head coach Wally Buono. The Lions won the game 45–18 with Dave Dickenson at quarterback. In late November 2006, the Toronto Argonauts expressed an interest in negotiating a contract with him, although he was still under contract to the Chiefs and the BC Lions still owned his CFL rights. On December 31, 2006, Printers signed a three-year deal with the Chiefs and was promoted to the active roster.

Printers was released by the Chiefs on September 1, 2007. His conversation with Chiefs Director of Player Personnel Ray Farmer was documented on episode 5 of HBO's Hard Knocks: Training Camp with the Kansas City Chiefs series. Printers said that his release was "unbelievable," especially since he had done everything asked of him during training camp. Printers was replaced by Tyler Thigpen.

=== Hamilton Tiger-Cats ===
Printers signed with the Hamilton Tiger-Cats on September 6, 2007, for a reported $500,000 a season, making him the highest paid player in the CFL. However, he ended up struggling greatly, throwing twice as many interceptions as touchdown passes. He was released by the team on February 19, 2009.

=== BC Lions (second stint) ===
In June 2009 Printers stated that he would be willing to return to the B.C. Lions.

On September 21, 2009, Printers agreed to terms with the Lions on a practice roster contract. He was signed from the practice roster on October 8, and suited up as the third-string quarterback on October 9, in a game versus the Edmonton Eskimos. He then became the starting quarterback on October 24, in a 33–30 overtime loss to the Saskatchewan Roughriders.

On Thanksgiving Day October 11, 2010, Printers replaced Travis Lulay at quarterback. Opponent Winnipeg Blue Bombers started rookie Alex Brink but he was replaced by Steven Jyles after an awful start. With Jyles at quarterback, the Bombers overcame a 32–14 4th quarter deficit and sent the game into overtime with the score tied at 32.

The Winnipeg fans who were booing earlier at Brink were now yelling to disrupt the Lions' play calling. With the Lions down 41–35 in the 2nd overtime period, Printers attempted a pass to O'Neil Wilson on 2nd and long. However, it was intercepted by Deon Beasley and returned for a touchdown. Shortly after throwing the game-ending interception, Printers was seen throwing his helmet to the ground in disgust and yelling at Wilson.

He was released from the team later that week.

=== Allen Wranglers ===
On February 3, 2012, Printers signed with the Allen Wranglers of the Indoor Football League. Printers made his debut with the Wranglers on February 25, 2012, against the Wichita Wild as backup to Bryan Randall and had a rushing touchdown.

== CFL career statistics ==
=== Regular season ===
		Passing								Rushing
Year	Team	Games	Att	Comp	Pct	Yards	TD	Int	Rating	Att	Yards	Avg	Long	TD	Fumb
2003	BC	18	2	1	50.0	4	1	0	158.3	2	44	22.0	34	0	2
2004	BC	18	494	325	65.8	5,088	35	10	115.0	82	469	5.7	40	9	10
2005	BC	14	216	131	60.6	1,671	9	6	87.2	38	336	8.8	27	2	2
2006	KC	0	0	0	0.0	0	0	0	0	0	0	0.0	0	0	0
2007	HAM	8	133	68	51.1	774	1	4	58.9	16	99	6.2	22	1	1
2008	HAM	15	223	124	55.6	1,693	5	10	68.8	48	386	8.0	26	6	7
2009	BC	5	68	43	63.2	686	3	2	99.3	10	58	5.8	25	0	0
2010	BC	14	237	129	54.4	1,731	10	6	81.4	13	75	5.8	13	1	8
CFL totals		92	1,373	821	59.8	11,647	64	38	91.3	209	1,467	7.0	40	19	30

=== Playoffs ===
Year & game	Team	GP	GS	ATT	COMP	YD	TD	INT	RUSH	YD	TD
2003 *East Semi-Final	BC	1	0	8	4	31	0	0	2	18	0
2004 West Final	BC	1	1	27	19	242	2	1	1	18	0
2005 West Final	BC	1	0	8	3	77	0	1	3	3	1
2009 *East Semi-Final	BC	1	1	35	24	360	1	0	2	13	1
2009 *East Final	BC	1	1	40	20	234	1	1	0	–	–
Totals		5	3	118	70	944	4	3	8	52	2

*team qualified for crossover

=== Grey Cup ===
Year	Team	GP	GS	ATT	COMP	YD	TD	INT	RUSH	YD	TD
2004	BC	1	0	0	–	–	–	–	0	–	–
Totals		1	0	0	-	-	-	-	0	-	-

== Records ==
Printers held the CFL record for single-game completion percentage, set with the BC Lions in a 49–11 victory over the Hamilton Tiger-Cats at Ivor Wynne Stadium on August 13, 2004. Printers completed 20 of 22 passes (90.9%) for 303 yards, including four touchdowns to slotback Geroy Simon, which has since been broken by Ricky Ray of the Edmonton Eskimos on October 31, 2008. Simon's four TD catches also tied a team record. As the Lions' starting quarterback for most of the 2004 season, Printers was also instrumental in Geroy Simon's league-best 14 touchdown receptions and league-best 1,750 receiving yards, which broke the Lions' club record for receiving yards in a season. The previous record was 1,731 yards, set by Darren Flutie in 1994.

== Personal life ==
His favorite player while growing up was Warren Moon. Outside of football, Printers is a motivational speaker.
