= Frédéric Chagnon =

Canadian gridiron football player (born 1992)

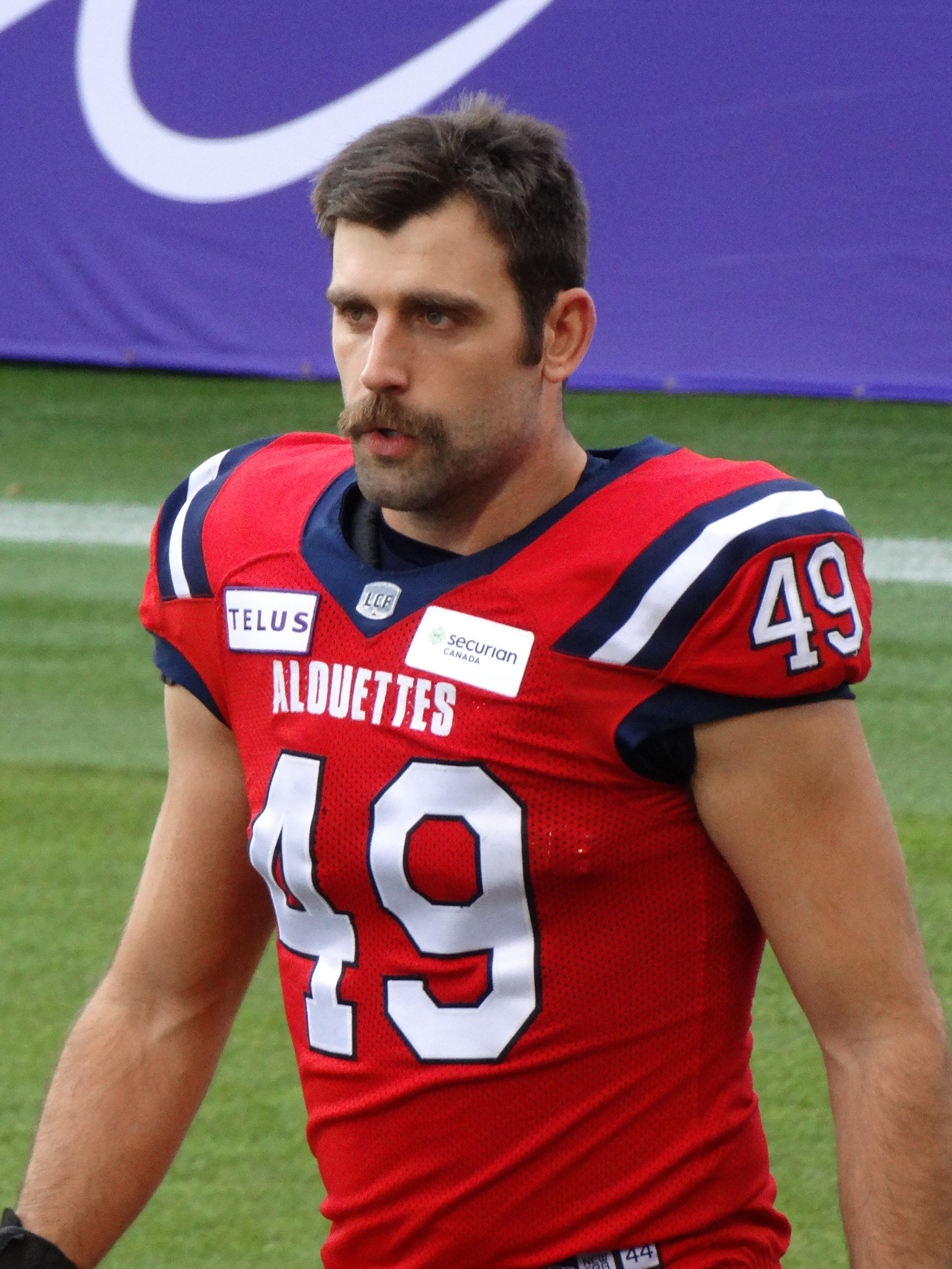
- Chagnon with the Montreal Alouettes in 2023

Profile
- Position: Linebacker

Personal information
- Born: November 20, 1992 (age 33); Montreal, Quebec, Canada
- Listed height: 6 ft 4 in (1.93 m)
- Listed weight: 230 lb (104 kg)

Career information
- University: Montreal
- CFL draft: 2017: 3rd round, 24th overall pick

Career history
- 2017–2019: BC Lions
- 2020–2021: Montreal Alouettes*
- 2021: Ottawa Redblacks
- 2022–2024: Montreal Alouettes
- * Offseason or practice squad member only

Awards and highlights
- Grey Cup champion (2023); Vanier Cup champion (2014)
- Stats at CFL.ca

Frédéric Chagnon (born November 20, 1992) is a Canadian professional football linebacker. He previously played in the Canadian Football League (CFL).

== University career ==
Chagnon played U Sports football with the Montreal Carabins where he was a member of the 50th Vanier Cup championship team.

== Professional career ==
Pre-draft measurables
Height	Weight	40-yard dash	20-yard shuttle	Three-cone drill	Vertical jump	Broad jump	Bench press
6 ft 3 1/2 in (1.92 m)	240 lb (109 kg)	5.00 s	4.46 s	7.34 s	29.0 in (0.74 m)	9 ft 7 1/2 in (2.93 m)	11 reps
All values from CFL Combine

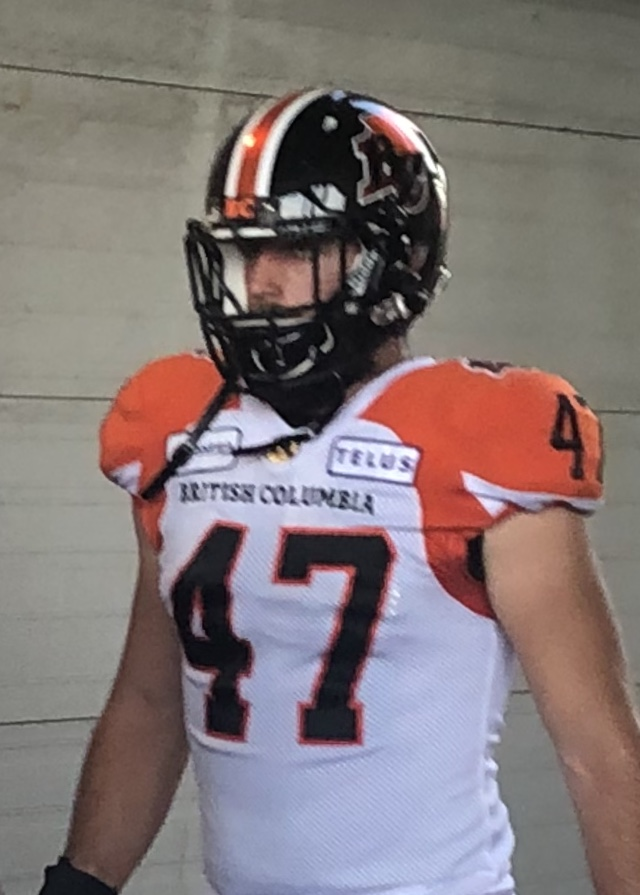
Chagnon with the BC Lions in 2019

=== BC Lions ===
Chagnon was selected in the third round and 24th overall by the BC Lions in the 2017 CFL draft and signed with the team on May 23, 2017. He played for the Lions for three years where he appeared in 51 regular season games, recording 26 special teams tackles over his tenure with the team. He became a free agent on February 11, 2020 upon the expiration of his rookie contract.

=== Montreal Alouettes (first stint) ===
Chagnon joined the Montreal Alouettes as a free agent on February 12, 2020. However, he did not play in 2020 due to the cancellation of the 2020 CFL season and he was released on July 22, 2021.

=== Ottawa Redblacks ===
On July 26, 2021, it was announced that Chagnon had been signed by the Ottawa Redblacks. He scored his first career touchdown following a blocked punt on October 6, 2021 against the Toronto Argonauts. He played in all 14 regular season games where he had one defensive tackle and six special teams tackles while also filling in as a long snapper. He became a free agent upon the expiry of his contract on February 8, 2022.

=== Montreal Alouettes (second stint) ===
On February 8, 2022, it was announced that Chagnon had re-signed with the Alouettes. He began the 2022 season on the practice roster, but made his Alouettes debut in Week 3 after fellow linebacker Chris Ackie was moved to the injured list. He played in 16 regular season games where he had six special teams tackles.

In 2023, Chagnon played in all 18 regular season games where he had a career-high 26 defensive tackles, eight special teams tackles, and his first career sack. He also played in all three post-season games, including the team's victory over the Winnipeg Blue Bombers in the 110th Grey Cup. He played in just nine games in 2024 where he recorded five special teams tackles. He became a free agent upon the expiry of his contract on February 11, 2025.
