= Steven Clarke (gridiron football) =

American gridiron football player (born 1991)

No. 29
- Position: Defensive back

Personal information
- Born: April 19, 1991 (age 35); Lauderdale Lakes, Florida, U.S.
- Listed height: 5 ft 10 in (1.78 m)
- Listed weight: 195 lb (88 kg)

Career information
- High school: Boyd H. Anderson
- College: Vanderbilt
- NFL draft: 2014: undrafted

Career history
- Miami Dolphins (2014)*; BC Lions (2014–2015); Tennessee Titans (2016)*; BC Lions (2016–2018); Columbus Destroyers (2019)*
- * Offseason or practice squad member only
- Stats at CFL.ca

Steven Clarke (born April 19, 1991) is an American former professional football defensive back. He attended the Vanderbilt University where he played college football for the Vanderbilt Commodores. In 2023, Clarke pleaded guilty to sexual exploitation of a minor, for which he was sentenced to 21 months in jail.

== Early life ==
Clarke played high school football for Boyd H. Anderson High School, where he was a defensive back, wide receiver, and running back. He was captain of the team in his final two years, and received All-State and All-County honorable mentions in his final year at Boyd Anderson. As a senior, he recorded 87 tackles, two sacks, and four interceptions as a defensive back, adding four touchdowns on the offense. From 2010 to 2013, Clarke played for the Vanderbilt Commodores as a cornerback and kick returner. He also briefly practiced as a running back in 2010. Appearing in 49 games, he recorded 61 solo tackles and an interception during his four years with the Commodores.

== Professional career ==
=== Miami Dolphins ===
Clarke went undrafted in the 2014 NFL draft and was later signed by the Miami Dolphins as a free agent. He played in three preseason games with the Dolphins, but was released from the team on August 26 before the start of the regular season.

=== BC Lions (first stint) ===
The BC Lions signed Clarke in September 2014 to their practice roster. He made his CFL debut against the Ottawa Redblacks on October 11, 2014, recording three special teams tackles. He went on to play one more game for the Lions in his rookie season. After beginning the 2015 season on the injured list, Clarke started his first game in Week 3 against the Saskatchewan Roughriders following an injury to Ryan Phillips, where he recorded three tackles and a sack. He started 15 games that year, while playing in 16, recording 48 tackles and one interception.

=== Tennessee Titans ===
On January 11, 2016 Clarke signed a reserve/futures contract with the Tennessee Titans. The deal is for 2 years and is worth $990,000. On May 9, 2016, he was waived.

=== BC Lions (second stint) ===
Following his release from the Titans, Clarke returned to the CFL, re-signing with the Lions on May 24, 2016.

=== Columbus Destroyers ===
On March 6, 2019, Clarke was assigned to the Columbus Destroyers. On April 13, 2019, he was placed on recallable reassignment and became a free agent.

== Lawsuit and conviction ==
In October 2014, Clarke was one of ten named plaintiffs in a class action lawsuit against several major broadcasting companies and NCAA athletic conferences seeking compensation. In the lawsuit, the plaintiffs alleged that the images of college athletes in the Football Bowl Subdivision and men's basketball Division I were improperly used without permission. While student athletes are required to sign forms allowing the NCAA to "generally promote" college sporting events, the athletes claimed that this term was overly vague and did not provide permission to commercially use their names or images. The case was dismissed by a judge in June 2015, who ruled that the players' claims were not strong enough to prove they were legally entitled to money from appearing in televised sporting events.

In 2023, Clarke pleaded guilty to sexual exploitation of a minor, for which he was sentenced to 21 months in jail. He will be required to register as a sex offender for 10 years.
