= Fort Worth Report =

Non-profit news organization covering Fort Worth, Texas

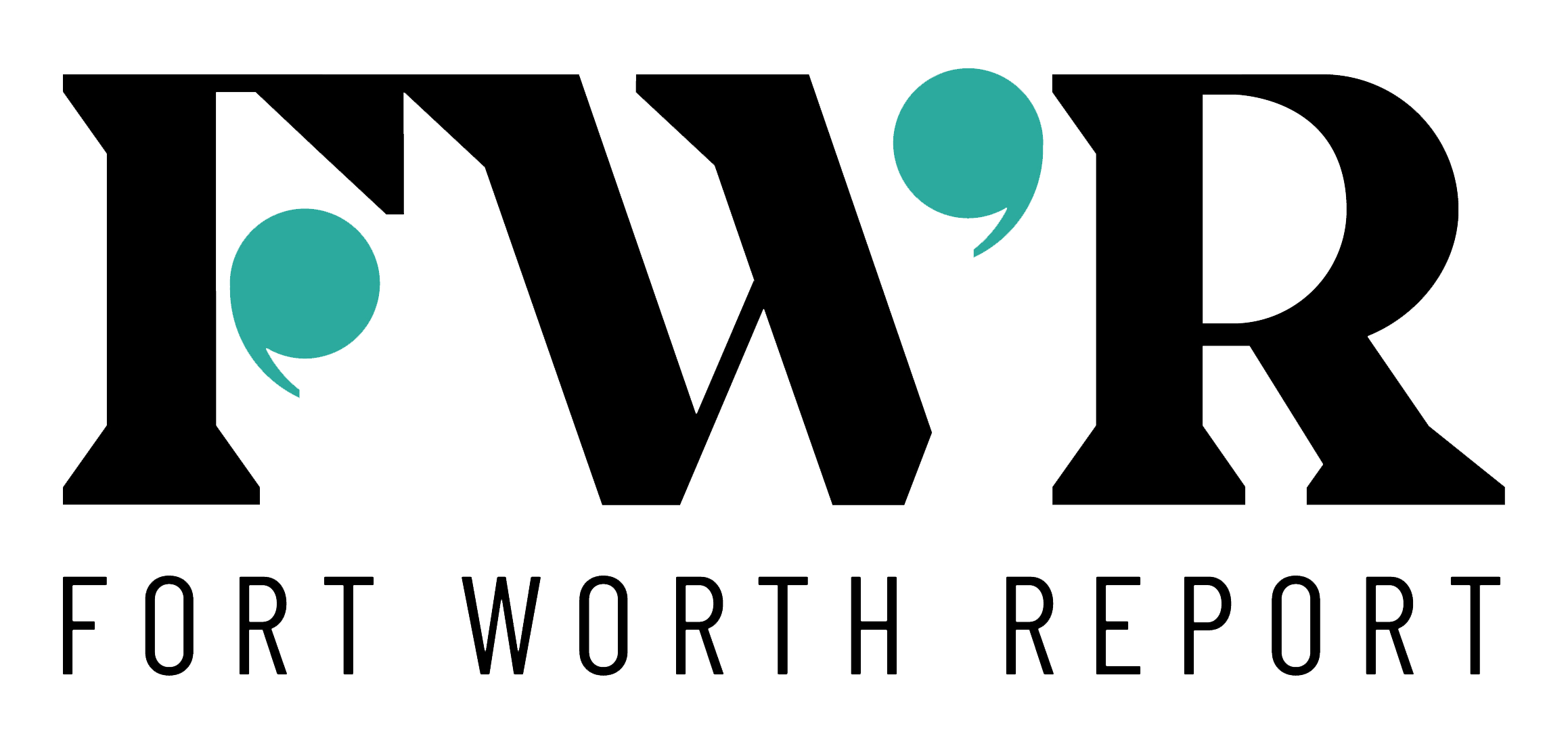
- Type: Nonprofit
- Format: Web
- Editor: Babs Rodriguez
- Founded: 2021
- Website: fortworthreport.org

Fort Worth Report (FWR) is a nonprofit news media outlet covering local government, business, education and arts in the city of Fort Worth, Texas.

== Overview ==
The organization, founded by local business leaders and former Fort Worth Star-Telegram publisher Wes Turner, announced its intentions in February 2021 and officially launched the newsroom in April 2021. Since its launch in response to declines and cuts at other local news organizations, FWR has added staff and expanded to provide radio news content through a collaboration with KERA News.

The founding CEO, editor and publisher was Chris Cobler, who was previously the editor and publisher of the Victoria Advocate. He resigned from his position at the FWR in April 2026.

== Union ==
In March 2026, FWR's staff voted to form a union. The Fort Worth Reporters Guild, which is affiliated with the NewsGuild-CWA, cited "inconsistent standards, heavy and ever-shifting workloads, and retaliatory management" as reasons for their members' decision to unionize.
