= 1955 Toronto Argonauts season =

CFL team season

- Head coach: Bill Swiacki
- Home stadium: Varsity Stadium

Results
- Record: 4–8
- Division place: 3rd, IRFU
- Playoffs: Lost IRFU Final

The 1955 Toronto Argonauts finished in third place in the Interprovincial Rugby Football Union with a 4–8 record. They appeared in the IRFU Final, but lost to the Montreal Alouettes.

== Regular season ==
=== Standings ===
Interprovincial Rugby Football Union
| Team | GP | W | L | T | PF | PA | Pts |
|---|---|---|---|---|---|---|---|
| Montreal Alouettes | 12 | 9 | 3 | 0 | 388 | 214 | 18 |
| Hamilton Tiger-Cats | 12 | 8 | 4 | 0 | 271 | 193 | 16 |
| Toronto Argonauts | 12 | 4 | 8 | 0 | 239 | 328 | 8 |
| Ottawa Rough Riders | 12 | 3 | 9 | 0 | 174 | 337 | 6 |

=== Schedule ===
| Week | Game | Date | Opponent | Results | | Venue | Attendance |
| Week | Game | Date | Opponent | Score | Record | Venue | Attendance |
|---|---|---|---|---|---|---|---|
| 1 | 1 | Sept 3 | vs. Hamilton Tiger-Cats | W 31–6 | 1–0 | Varsity Stadium | 18,261 |
| 1 | 2 | Sept 5 | at Hamilton Tiger-Cats | L 12–37 | 1–1 | Civic Stadium | 18,628 |
| 2 | 3 | Sept 10 | at Montreal Alouettes | L 11–43 | 1–2 | Molson Stadium | 22,227 |
| 3 | 4 | Sept 17 | vs. Ottawa Rough Riders | L 12–27 | 1–3 | Varsity Stadium | 16,078 |
| 4 | 5 | Sept 24 | at Ottawa Rough Riders | W 30–19 | 2–3 | Lansdowne Park | 15,755 |
| 5 | 6 | Oct 1 | vs. Montreal Alouettes | L 28–30 | 2–4 | Varsity Stadium | 19,271 |
| 6 | 7 | Oct 8 | at Hamilton Tiger-Cats | L 11–15 | 2–5 | Civic Stadium | 17,000 |
| 6 | 8 | Oct 10 | vs. Hamilton Tiger-Cats | W 16–15 | 3–5 | Varsity Stadium | 19,066 |
| 7 | 9 | Oct 15 | at Montreal Alouettes | L 23–44 | 3–6 | Molson Stadium | 21,102 |
| 8 | 10 | Oct 22 | vs. Montreal Alouettes | L 12–43 | 3–7 | Varsity Stadium | 18,329 |
| 9 | 11 | Oct 29 | vs. Ottawa Rough Riders | W 29–13 | 4–7 | Varsity Stadium | 12,213 |
| 10 | 12 | Nov 5 | at Ottawa Rough Riders | L 24–36 | 4–8 | Lansdowne Park | 8,220 |

== Postseason ==
| Round | Date | Opponent | Results | | Venue | Attendance |
| Round | Date | Opponent | Score | Record | Venue | Attendance |
|---|---|---|---|---|---|---|
| IRFU Semi-Final | Nov 12 | at Hamilton Tiger-Cats | W 32–28 | 1–0 | Civic Stadium | 17,600 |
| IRFU Final | Nov 19 | at Montreal Alouettes | L 36–38 | 1–1 | Molson Stadium | 21,103 |
