= Ron Clinkscale =

American gridiron football player (1933–2024)

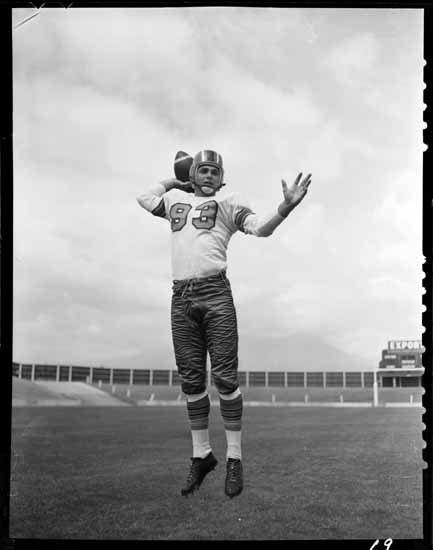
- Clinkscale with the BC Lions in 1955

No. 93, 86, 97
- Positions: Quarterback, halfback

Personal information
- Born: October 22, 1933; Amarillo, Texas, U.S.
- Died: July 10, 2024 (aged 90); Fort Worth, Texas, U.S.
- Listed height: 6 ft 0 in (1.83 m)
- Listed weight: 185 lb (84 kg)

Career information
- College: Texas Christian

Career history
- 1955–1956: BC Lions
- 1956–1958: Calgary Stampeders

Ronald William Clinkscale (October 22, 1933 – July 10, 2024) was an American professional football player who played four seasons in the Western Interprovincial Football Union (WIFU) with the BC Lions and Calgary Stampeders. He played college football for the TCU Horned Frogs.

== Early life and college ==
Ronald William Clinkscale was born on October 22, 1933, in Amarillo, Texas. He played high school football at Arlington Heights High School in Fort Worth, Texas, and earned all-state honors. He was noted as the "fastest boy in the Fort Worth schools in the 100-yard dash."

Clinkscale accepted an athletic scholarship to play college football for the TCU Horned Frogs of Texas Christian University as a halfback and quarterback. He was on the freshman team in 1951 and a three-year letterman from 1952 to 1954. The Fort Worth Report said he was the fastest player on the team. After his senior year, Clinkscale played in the East–West Shrine Game as a defensive halfback.

== Professional career ==
On January 3, 1955, nearly a month before the 1955 NFL draft, Clinkscale signed with the BC Lions of the Western Interprovincial Football Union (WIFU). He chose to play in Canada due to them offering more money than the NFL. He played both halfback and quarterback while in the WIFU. Clinkscale dressed in all 16 games, starting three, during the 1955 season, recording 30 completions on 66 passing attempts (45.5%) for 462 yards, two touchdowns, and nine interceptions, 92 rushes for 376 yards and four touchdowns, 15 receptions for 188 yards, one defensive interception, six kickoff returns for 114 yards, and 18 punts for 114 yards. He was the backup quarterback to Arnold Galiffa that year. The Lions finished the season with a 5–11 record. Clinkscale played in one game for the Lions in 1956, rushing three times for 26 yards, catching one pass for 16 yards, returning one kickoff for 39 yards, and returning two punts for 12 yards. He was cut by BC on August 28, 1956.

Clinkscale was signed by the Calgary Stampeders of the WIFU on September 5, 1956. He dressed in 12 games for the Stampeders during the 1956 season, totaling 52 carries for 210 yards, 15 catches for 182 yards and one touchdown, four of ten passes for 41 yards and one interception, four kickoff returns for 88 yards, one punt return for nine yards, and two defensive interceptions. Calgary went 4–12. Clinkscale dressed in 15 games in 1957, recording 21 rushes for 105 yards and four touchdowns, 13 completions on 26 pass attempts for 200 yards and two interceptions, two catches for 38 yards, five kickoff returns for 119 yards, and three defensive interceptions. The Stampeders finished the season with a 6–10 record and lost in the Western semifinal to the Winnipeg Blue Bombers. He dressed in all 15 games for the second straight season in 1958 (the first year of the modern Canadian Football League), totaling 57 rushing attempts for 155 yards and one touchdown, 12 receptions for 145 yards and one touchdown, ten of 25 passes for 170 yards, one touchdown, and three interceptions, five kickoff returns for 110 yards, three punt returns for 12 yards, and two defensive interceptions. Clinkscale suffered a back injury in the final game of the year as Calgary finished 6–9–1. He retired shortly after the 1958 season. He said the back injury did not factor into his decision.

== Personal life ==
Clinkscale worked as an accountant during the WIFU offseasons. He worked for the Fort Worth office of Leatherwood and Ward, and retired as managing partner. He was inducted into the TCU Lettermen’s Association Hall of Fame in 1986. He served on the TCU Board of Trustees from 1985 to 2016. Clinkscale was also on the board of the TCU Fellowship of Christian Athletes, and served as the president of the TCU Alumni Association.

Clinkscale died on July 10, 2024, in Fort Worth at the age of 90 after a long illness.
