= 2021 BC Lions season =

Canadian football team season

- General manager: Rick Campbell; Neil McEvoy
- Head coach: Rick Campbell
- Home stadium: BC Place Stadium

Results
- Record: 5–9
- Division place: 4th, West
- Playoffs: Did not qualify
- Team MOP: Lucky Whitehead
- Team MOC: Boseko Lokombo
- Team MOR: Jordan Williams

Uniform
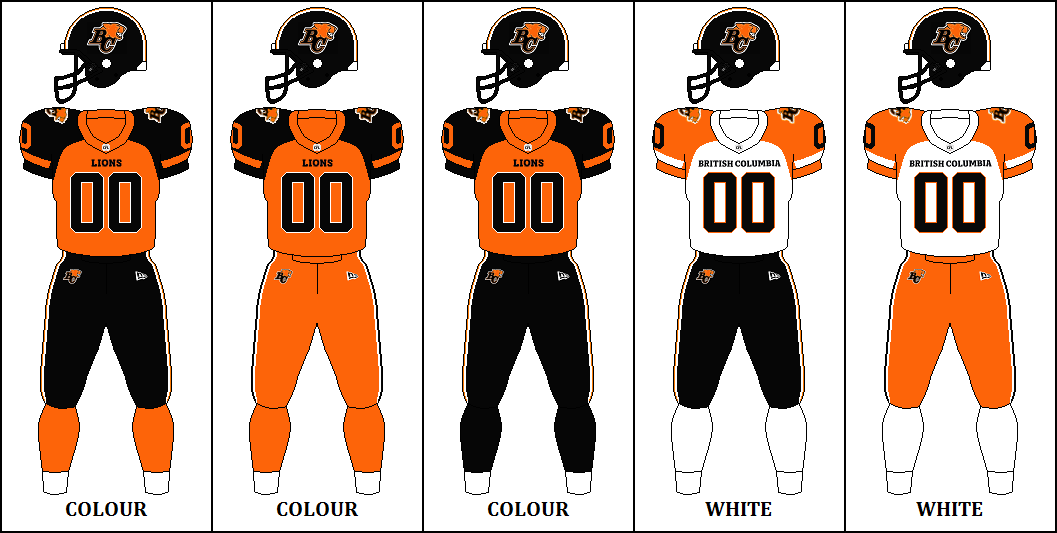

The 2021 BC Lions season was the 63rd season for the team in the Canadian Football League (CFL) and their 67th overall. The Lions failed to improve upon their 5–13 record from 2019 and were eliminated from playoff qualification on November 12, 2021, following a week 15 loss to the Calgary Stampeders.

The 2021 CFL season was the first season with Rick Campbell as the team's head coach. Campbell will also perform general manager duties alongside co-general manager Neil McEvoy following the resignation of former general manager Ed Hervey.

The Lions held their training camp at Hillside Stadium in Kamloops, British Columbia for the 11th consecutive season.

An 18-game season schedule was originally released on November 20, 2020, but it was announced on April 21, 2021 that the start of the season would likely be delayed until August and feature a 14-game schedule. On June 15, 2021, the league released the revised 14-game schedule with regular season play beginning on August 5, 2021.

== Offseason ==
=== General manager ===
On October 16, 2020, the team's general manager, Ed Hervey, announced his resignation for personal reasons. There had been speculation that his departure from the organization was related to the grievance filed by starting quarterback Mike Reilly who was guaranteed $250,000 in 2020, despite the season being cancelled. However, this was never confirmed and the Lions eventually reached an agreement to re-structure Reilly's contract.

On December 7, 2020, it was announced that head coach Rick Campbell and director of football operations Neil McEvoy were promoted to co-general managers.

=== CFL global draft ===
The 2021 CFL global draft took place on April 15, 2021. The Lions won the draft lottery and selected first overall. With the format being a snake draft, the Lions selected first in the odd-numbered rounds and last in the even-numbered rounds.

Round	Pick	Player	Position	University/Club Team	Nationality
1	1	Jake Ford	P	Ouachita Baptist	Australia
2	18	Bo Qiao Li	DL	Charleston	China
3	19	Takeru Yamasaki	K	Elecom Kobe Finies	Japan
4	36	Niklas Gustav	DL	Morningside	Germany

== CFL national draft ==
The 2021 CFL draft took place on May 4, 2021. The Lions had five selections in the six-round snake draft and had the fourth pick in odd rounds and the sixth pick in even rounds. The team traded its fourth-round selection to the Toronto Argonauts after trading Davon Coleman in exchange for Shawn Lemon.

Round	Pick	Player	Position	School	Hometown
1	4	Daniel Joseph	DL	North Carolina State	Toronto, ON
2	15	Alaric Jackson	OL	Iowa	Windsor, ON
3	22	Ben Hladik	LB	British Columbia	Vernon, BC
5	40	Alfred Green	DL	Wilfrid Laurier	Ajax, ON
6	51	Tyler Packer	OL	Calgary	Calgary, AB

== Preseason ==
Due to the shortening of the season, the CFL confirmed that pre-season games would not be played in 2021.

=== Planned schedule ===
Week	Game	Date	Kickoff	Opponent	TV	Venue
A	1	Sun, May 23	1:30 p.m. PDT	at Calgary Stampeders	NA	McMahon Stadium
B	Bye					
C	2	Fri, June 4	7:00 p.m. PDT	vs. Edmonton Elks	NA	BC Place

== Regular season ==
=== Standings ===
West Division
Team	GP	W	L	T	Pts	PF	PA	Div	Stk	
Winnipeg Blue Bombers	14	11	3	0	22	351	187	8–1	L2	Details
Saskatchewan Roughriders	14	9	5	0	18	290	285	5–4	L1	Details
Calgary Stampeders	14	8	6	0	16	315	263	6–4	W3	Details
BC Lions	14	5	9	0	10	313	351	2–7	W1	Details
Edmonton Elks	14	3	11	0	6	246	377	2–7	L1	Details

=== Schedule ===
The Lions initially had a schedule that featured 18 regular season games beginning on June 12 and ending on October 29. However, due to the COVID-19 pandemic in Canada, the Canadian Football League delayed the start of the regular season to August 5, 2021 and the Lions will begin their 14-game season on August 6, 2021.

Week	Game	Date	Kickoff	Opponent	Results		TV	Venue	Attendance	Summary
Week	Game	Date	Kickoff	Opponent	Score	Record	TV	Venue	Attendance	Summary
1	1	Fri, Aug 6	6:30 p.m. PDT	@ Saskatchewan Roughriders	L 29–33	0–1	TSN	Mosaic Stadium	33,350	Recap
2	2	Thurs, Aug 12	6:30 p.m. PDT	@ Calgary Stampeders	W 15–9	1–1	TSN/RDS2	McMahon Stadium	21,029	Recap
3	3	Thurs, Aug 19	7:00 p.m. PDT	Edmonton Elks	L 16–21	1–2	TSN/ESPN2	BC Place	12,500	Recap
4	4	Sat, Aug 28	4:00 p.m. PDT	@ Ottawa Redblacks	W 24–12	2–2	TSN/RDS	TD Place Stadium	15,000	Recap
5	Bye									
6	5	Sat, Sept 11	7:00 p.m. PDT	Ottawa Redblacks	W 45–13	3–2	TSN/RDS	BC Place	12,552	Recap
7	6	Sat, Sept 18	4:00 p.m. PDT	@ Montreal Alouettes	W 27–18	4–2	TSN/RDS	Molson Stadium	13,591	Recap
8	7	Fri, Sept 24	7:30 p.m. PDT	Saskatchewan Roughriders	L 24–31	4–3	TSN/ESPN2	BC Place	12,500	Recap
9	8	Fri, Oct 1	7:00 p.m. PDT	Winnipeg Blue Bombers	L 9–30	4–4	TSN/ESPNews	BC Place	12,500	Recap
10	Bye									
11	9	Sat, Oct 16	4:00 p.m. PDT	Calgary Stampeders	L 10–39	4–5	TSN	BC Place	12,500	Recap
12	10	Sat, Oct 23	4:00 p.m. PDT	@ Winnipeg Blue Bombers	L 0–45	4–6	TSN	IG Field	23,750	Recap
13	11	Sat, Oct 30	1:00 p.m. PDT	@ Toronto Argonauts	L 29–31 (OT)	4–7	TSN	BMO Field	9,011	Recap
14	12	Fri, Nov 5	4:00 p.m. PDT	@ Hamilton Tiger-Cats	L 18–26	4–8	TSN/RDS	Tim Hortons Field	21,618	Recap
15	13	Fri, Nov 12	7:30 p.m. PST	Calgary Stampeders	L 23–33	4–9	TSN	BC Place	12,500	Recap
16	14	Fri, Nov 19	7:30 p.m. PST	Edmonton Elks	W 43–10	5–9	TSN	BC Place	12,500	Recap

# Games played with colour uniforms.
# Games played with white uniforms.

== Roster ==
2021 BC Lions final roster
**Quarterbacks**: 12 Nathan Rourke; 9 Kevin Thomson; **Running backs**: 24 James Butler; 42 Jamel Lyles; 34 David Mackie; 35 Mario Villamizar; **Receivers**: 16 Bryan Burnham; 86 Jevon Cottoy; 85 Cordell Hastings; 84 Keon Hatcher; 80 Quadree Henderson; 88 Shaq Johnson; 83 T. J. Rahming; 19 Dominique Rhymes; 82 Jacob Scarfone; 7 Lucky Whitehead	**Offensive linemen**: 65 Sukh Chungh G; 51 Peter Godber C; 66 David Knevel T/G; 50 Phillip Norman T; 54 Andrew Peirson C/G; 59 Kent Perkins T; 67 Hunter Steward G; **Defensive linemen**: 92 Josh Banks DT; 53 Alex Bazzie DE; 45 Tim Bonner DT; 94 Michael Divinity DE; 48 Niklas Gustav DE; 98 Obum Gwacham DE; 91 Courtney Hammond DT; 95 Kevin Thurmon DT	**Linebackers**: 44 Isaiah Guzylak-Messam; 46 Ben Hladik; 31 Adam Konar; 20 Bo Lokombo; 21 Jordan Williams; 55 Josh Woods; **Defensive backs**: 11 Anthony Cioffi; 37 KiAnte Hardin; 28 Jamie Harry; 18 Hakeem Johnson; 26 Austin Joyner; 6 T. J. Lee; 4 Garry Peters; 25 O'Shane Samuels; 14 Marcus Sayles; 23 Anthony Thompson	**Special teams**: 40 Tanner Doll LS; 41 Stefan Flintoft P; 49 Nick Vogel K; **Practice roster**: 39 Jimmy Camacho K; 87 Marcus Davis WR; 17 Jake Ford P; 64 Matt Guevremont T; 43 Bailey Hale K; 96 Shakir Soto DT; 36 Bejour Wilson DB	**Injured list**: 69 Jarell Broxton T; 1 Lemar Durant WR; 29 Jalon Edwards-Cooper DB; 61 Joel Figueroa T; 27 Victor Gamboa DB; 62 Ryker Mathews T; 3 Chris Rainey RB; 13 Mike Reilly QB; 10 J. R. Tavai DE; **Suspended**: 90 Ade Aruna DE; 99 Ufomba Kamalu DT; 68 Boqiao Li DE; 8 DeVier Posey WR
Italics indicate American player • **Bold** indicates Global player

== Coaching staff ==
BC Lions staff
Front office and support staff: Owner – Amar Doman; President and ceo – Rick LeLacheur; Vice President, Business – George Chayka; General managers – Rick Campbell and Neil McEvoy; Director of football operations – Neil McEvoy; Director of us scouting – Ryan Rigmaiden; Director of canadian scouting & cfl draft coordinator – Rob Ralph; Director of global scouting and us regional scout – Geroy Simon; Video coordinator – Andrew Millin; Head athletic therapist – Tristan Sandhu; Equipment manager – Aaron Yeung	Head coaches: Head coach – Rick Campbell; Offensive coaches: Offensive coordinator – Jordan Maksymic; Receivers – Jason Tucker; Running backs – Danny O'Brien; Offensive line – Kelly Bates; Offensive assistant – Trysten Dyce; Defensive coaches: Defensive coordinator – Rick Campbell; Defensive line – Vacant; Linebackers – Travis Brown; Defensive backs – Ryan Phillips; Defensive assistant – Claudell Louis; Special teams coaches: Special teams coordinator – Don Yanowsky; → Coaching staff
