= 2021 Edmonton Elks season =

Canadian football season

- General manager: Brock Sunderland
- Head coach: Jaime Elizondo
- Home stadium: Commonwealth Stadium

Results
- Record: 3–11
- Division place: 5th, West
- Playoffs: Did not qualify
- Team MOP: James Wilder Jr.
- Team MOC: Sean Whyte
- Team MOR: Nyles Morgan

Uniform

The 2021 Edmonton Elks season was the 63rd season for the team in the Canadian Football League (CFL) and their 72nd overall. This was the first season that the team competed under a new name, as the "Eskimos" moniker was retired in 2020, and the new name "Elks" was announced on June 1, 2021.

The team failed to qualify for the playoffs for the first time since 2018 following a week 14 loss to the Saskatchewan Roughriders on November 5, 2021. The team also finished the season without a home win for the first time in the team's 72–year history following that same home loss to the Roughriders.

This was the fourth season under general manager Brock Sunderland. This would have been the first season under head coach Scott Milanovich, but he resigned from his position on January 25, 2021. Instead, Jaime Elizondo was named as the 23rd head coach in the team's history on February 1, 2021.

An 18-game season schedule was originally released on November 20, 2020, but it was announced on April 21, 2021 that the start of the season would likely be delayed until August and feature a 14-game schedule. On June 15, 2021, the league released the revised 14-game schedule with regular season play beginning on August 5, 2021.

== Offseason ==
=== CFL global draft ===
The 2021 CFL global draft took place on April 15, 2021. With the format being a snake draft, Edmonton selected second in the odd-numbered rounds and eighth in the even-numbered rounds.

Round	Pick	Player	Position	University/Club Team	Nationality
1	2	Steven Nielsen	OL	Eastern Michigan	Denmark
2	17	Misiona Aiolupotea-Pei	DL	Washington State	New Zealand
3	20	Tibo Debaillie	DL	Towson	Belgium
4	35	Matt Leo	DE	Iowa State	Australia

== CFL national draft ==
The 2021 CFL draft took place on May 4, 2021. The team had six selections in the six-round snake draft and had the fifth pick in each of the rounds.

Round	Pick	Player	Position	University Team	Hometown
1	5	Cole Nelson	DL	Alberta	Edmonton, AB
2	14	Grant McDonald	LB	Calgary	Tsawwassen, BC
3	23	Deonte Glover	RB	Shepherd	Inwood, WV
4	32	Dominic Johnson	WR	Buffalo	Windsor, ON
5	41	Peter Kourtis	OL	Saint Mary's	Toronto, ON
6	50	Kenan Clarke	DB	Cornell	Pickering, ON

== Preseason ==
Due to the shortening of the season, the CFL confirmed that pre-season games would not be played in 2021.

=== Planned schedule ===
Week	Game	Date	Kickoff	Opponent	TV	Venue
A	Bye					
B	1	Sat, May 29	2:00 p.m. MDT	vs. Calgary Stampeders	NA	Commonwealth Stadium
C	2	Fri, Jun 4	8:00 p.m. MDT	at BC Lions	NA	BC Place

== Regular season ==
=== Season standings ===
West Division
Team	GP	W	L	T	Pts	PF	PA	Div	Stk	
Winnipeg Blue Bombers	14	11	3	0	22	351	187	8–1	L2	Details
Saskatchewan Roughriders	14	9	5	0	18	290	285	5–4	L1	Details
Calgary Stampeders	14	8	6	0	16	315	263	6–4	W3	Details
BC Lions	14	5	9	0	10	313	351	2–7	W1	Details
Edmonton Elks	14	3	11	0	6	246	377	2–7	L1	Details

=== Season schedule ===
The Elks initially had a schedule that featured 18 regular season games beginning on June 12 and ending on October 30. However, due to the COVID-19 pandemic in Canada, the Canadian Football League delayed the start of the regular season to August 5, 2021 and the Elks began their 14-game season on August 7, 2021.

On August 22, 2021, it was announced that the Elks had several players test positive for COVID-19, so the August 26, 2021 game was postponed with the rescheduled date to be declared once the Elks pass health and safety protocols. The CFL announced on September 2, 2021 that the game was rescheduled for Tuesday, November 16, 2021, meaning that the Elks will play three games in just a seven-day span.

Week	Game	Date	Kickoff	Opponent	Results		TV	Venue	Attendance	Summary
Week	Game	Date	Kickoff	Opponent	Score	Record	TV	Venue	Attendance	Summary
1	1	Sat, Aug 7	8:00 p.m. MDT	Ottawa Redblacks	L 12–16	0–1	TSN/RDS2/ESPN2	Commonwealth Stadium	30,302	Recap
2	2	Sat, Aug 14	5:00 p.m. MDT	Montreal Alouettes	L 13–30	0–2	TSN/RDS	Commonwealth Stadium	25,116	Recap
3	3	Thurs, Aug 19	8:00 p.m. MDT	@ BC Lions	W 21–16	1–2	TSN/ESPN2	BC Place	12,500	Recap
4	Bye (originally scheduled for Thurs, Aug 26, at Toronto Argonauts; rescheduled to week 16)									
5	4	Mon, Sept 6	2:30 p.m. MDT	@ Calgary Stampeders	W 32–20	2–2	TSN/ESPNews	McMahon Stadium	31,039	Recap
6	5	Sat, Sept 11	5:00 p.m. MDT	Calgary Stampeders	L 16–32	2–3	TSN/RDS	Commonwealth Stadium	33,493*	Recap
7	6	Sat, Sept 18	7:45 p.m. MDT	Winnipeg Blue Bombers	L 22–37	2–4	TSN	Commonwealth Stadium	23,310	Recap
8	Bye									
9	7	Tues, Sept 28	5:30 p.m. MDT	@ Ottawa Redblacks	L 24–34	2–5	TSN/RDS2	TD Place Stadium	12,108	Recap
10	8	Fri, Oct 8	6:30 p.m. MDT	@ Winnipeg Blue Bombers	L 3–30	2–6	TSN/RDS2	IG Field	27,388	Recap
11	9	Fri, Oct 15	7:00 p.m. MDT	Winnipeg Blue Bombers	L 16–26	2–7	TSN	Commonwealth Stadium	24,276	Recap
12	Bye									
13	10	Fri, Oct 29	7:45 p.m. MDT	Hamilton Tiger-Cats	L 23–39	2–8	TSN	Commonwealth Stadium	22,857	Recap
14	11	Fri, Nov 5	7:45 p.m. MDT	Saskatchewan Roughriders	L 17–19	2–9	TSN	Commonwealth Stadium	24,115	Recap
15	12	Sat, Nov 13	2:00 p.m. MST	@ Saskatchewan Roughriders	L 24–29	2–10	TSN/RDS	Mosaic Stadium	26,056	Recap
16	13	Tues, Nov 16	5:30 p.m. MST	@ Toronto Argonauts	W 13–7	3–10	TSN	BMO Field	6,247	Recap
16	14	Fri, Nov 19	8:30 p.m. MST	@ BC Lions	L 10–43	3–11	TSN	BC Place	12,500	Recap

*Top attendance in CFL

== Roster ==
Edmonton Elks roster
**Quarterbacks**: -- Nick Arbuckle; 15 Taylor Cornelius; 14 Dakota Prukop; **Running backs**: 25 Walter Fletcher; 32 James Wilder; 5 Terry Williams; **Fullbacks**: 27 Tanner Green; 49 James Tuck; **Receivers**: 82 Greg Ellingson; 12 Mike Jones; 11 Shai Ross; 4 Tevaun Smith; 88 Jalen Tolliver; 83 Daniel Vandervoort; 87 Derel Walker; **Offensive linemen**: 57 David Beard; 60 Tomas Jack-Kurdyla; 64 Tyler Higby; 61 Steven Nielsen; 66 Matt O'Donnell; 58 Justin Renfrow; 56 Kyle Saxelid	**Defensive linemen**: 9 Mathieu Betts; 93 Kwaku Boateng DE; 95 Thomas Costigan; 96 Mike Moore; 91 Cole Nelson; 99 Christian Rector; **Linebackers**: 44 Keishawn Bierria; 33 Grant McDonald; 10 Derrick Moncrief; 45 Nyles Morgan; 13 Shaydon Philip; 31 Malik Tyne; **Defensive backs**: 36 Aaron Grymes; 28 Jordan Hoover S; 2 Jonathon Mincy; 0 Jonathan Rose; 8 Trumaine Washington; 29 Darius Williams; 37 Josh Woodman; **Special teams**: 48 Martin Bédard LS; 70 Hugh O'Neill K; 46 Chad Rempel LS; 6 Sean Whyte K	**1-Game Injured List**: 94 Jake Ceresna DL; 35 Maxime Rouyer LB; 3 Antonio Simmons DL; **6-Game Injured List**: 38 Dotun Aketepe DB; -- Nate Anderson DL; 42 Malik Clements LB; 68 D'Antne Demery OL; 80 Armanti Edwards WR; 20 Scott Hutter DB; 67 Colin Kelly OL; 55 SirVincent Rogers OL	**Practice roster**: 23 Bruce Anderson RB; 19 Eric Blake DB; 26 Bryan Blunt LB; 30 Dante Brown K; 90 Chris Casher DL; 16 Case Cookus QB; 54 Tibo Debaillie DL; 81 Earnest Edwards WR; 69 Chris Gangarossa OL; 22 Afolabi Laguda DB; 24 Nafees Lyon DB; 62 Emanuel McGirt OL; 92 Chris Nelson DL; 18 Chris Osei-Kusi WR; 97 Alain Pae DL; 89 Diego Viamontes WR; 26 Herb Waters DB; 65 De'Ondre Wesley OL; **Suspended**: -- Curtis Akins LB; -- Darrell Brown OL; -- Tarean Folston RB; -- J.J. Jones WR; -- Peter Kourtis OL; -- David Perkins DL; -- Debione Renfro DB; -- Albert Smalls DB
Italics indicate American player • **Bold** indicates Global player • 45 Active, 9 Injured, 17 Practice, 8 Suspended; Roster updated 2021-10-18 • Depth chart • Transactions

== Coaching staff ==
Edmonton Elks staff
Front office: Owner – Larry Thompson; President and CEO – Chris Morris; General manager – Ed Hervey; Senior Assistant General Manager – Spencer Zimmerman; Direct of U.S. Scouting – Spencer Boehm; Direct of Canadian Scouting – Rich Massaro; Direct of Football Operations – Nick Pelletier; Football Operations Assistant – Nic Cross; Equipment Manager – Dan Rosnau; Head coaches: Head coach – Mark Kilam; Assistant Head Coach/Offensive Coordinator – Jordan Maksymic; Offensive coaches: Offensive Line and Run Game Coordinator – Stephen Sorrells; Running Backs – Jabari Arthur; Receivers – Jason Tucker	Defensive coaches: Defensive Coordinator and Linebackers – J. C. Sherritt; Defensive Line – Cedric Douglas; Defensive Backs – Aaron Grymes; Defensive Quality Control – Danny Nesbitt; Defensive Analyst – Anthony Vitale; Special teams coach: Special Teams Coach – Des Catellier; Strength and conditioning: Strength and Conditioning Specialist – Danelle Tucker; → Coaching staff → More CFL staffs
