= Football in London (disambiguation) =

Football in London refers to the sport of association football played in the capital of the United Kingdom.

Football in London may also refer to:

- NFL International Series § London Games, a series of American football games played in London by visiting NFL teams
- AFL London, an Australian rules football league in London
- London Beefeaters, a Canadian football team based in London, Ontario
- London Blitz (American football), an American football team based in London
- London GAA, includes clubs and the team that plays inter-county Gaelic football games in the NFL and SFC
- London Monarchs, a defunct American football team based in London
- London Olympians, an American football team based in London
- London Warriors, an American football team based in London
