= Stefan Flintoft =

American gridiron football player (born 1995)

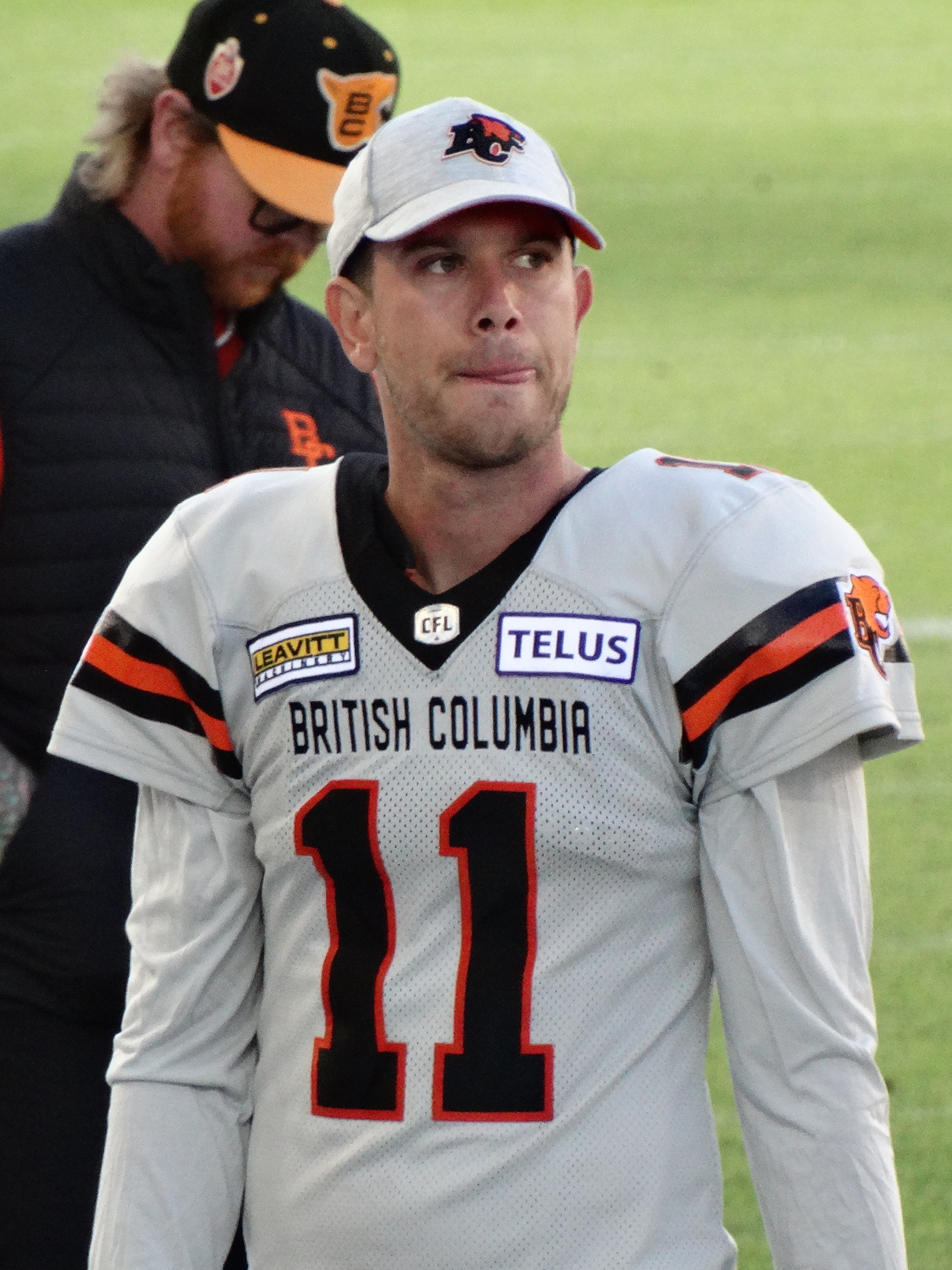
- Flintoft with the BC Lions in 2024

Profile
- Position: Punter

Personal information
- Born: October 8, 1995 (age 31); Santa Monica, California, U.S.
- Listed height: 6 ft 3 in (1.91 m)
- Listed weight: 191 lb (87 kg)

Career information
- High school: Loyola High (CA)
- College: UCLA

Career history
- 2020–2025: BC Lions
- Stats at CFL.ca

Stefan More Flintoft (born October 8, 1995) is an American professional football punter.

== College career ==
After using a redshirt season in 2014, Flintoft played college football for the UCLA Bruins from 2015 to 2018. After dressing as a backup punter and kicker in 2015, he became the team's primary punter in 2016 and continued in that role for the remainder of his collegiate career.

== Professional career ==
=== Denver Broncos ===
Flintoft attended mini-camp with the Denver Broncos after going undrafted in the 2019 NFL draft, but was not offered a contract by the team.

=== BC Lions ===
After not playing in 2019, Flintoft signed with the BC Lions on January 14, 2020. However, he did not play in 2020 due to the cancellation of the 2020 CFL season.

Flintoft began the 2021 season on the practice roster, but made his professional debut in week 3 on August 19, 2021, against the Edmonton Elks, where he had six punts for a 51.2-yard average. He finished the season as the team's punter having played in the remaining 12 regular season games where he punted 74 times with a 47.8-yard average. He was the team's nominee for Most Outstanding Special Teams Player in 2021.

On December 23, 2021, it was announced that Flintoft had signed a contract extension with the Lions. He retained his job as the team's punter for the 2022 season.

On February 11, 2025, Fintoft left the Lions as a free agent at the expiry of his contract.

== Personal life ==
Flintoft was born to parents Ingrid and Thomas Flintoft and has one sister.
