= Zackary Medeiros =

Canadian gridiron football player (born 1990)

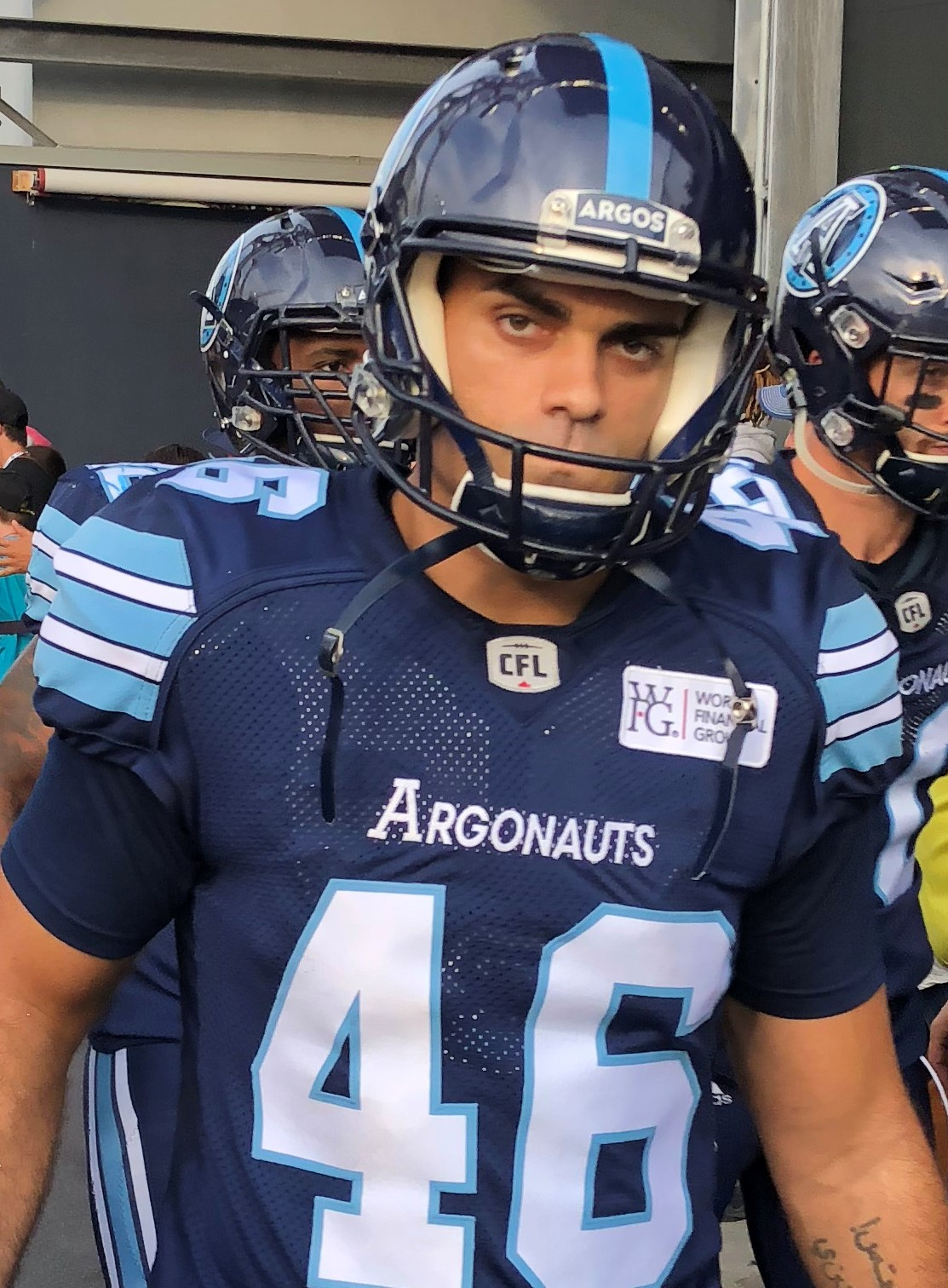
- Medeiros before his first game as an Argonaut on August 2, 2018.

Profile
- Positions: Punter, placekicker

Personal information
- Born: October 22, 1990 (age 36); London, Ontario, Canada
- Listed height: 6 ft 0 in (1.83 m)
- Listed weight: 206 lb (93 kg)

Career information
- CJFL: London Beefeaters
- University: Montreal; Western Ontario
- CFL draft: 2014: 6th round, 48th overall pick

Career history
- 2014: Edmonton Eskimos*
- 2015: Edmonton Eskimos*
- 2016–2017: Ottawa Redblacks
- 2018: Montreal Alouettes*
- 2018–2019: Toronto Argonauts
- * Offseason or practice squad member only

Awards and highlights
- Grey Cup champion (2016)
- Stats at CFL.ca

Zackary Medeiros (born October 22, 1990) is a Canadian former professional football placekicker and punter who played in the Canadian Football League (CFL). He was originally drafted 48th overall by the Edmonton Eskimos in the 2014 CFL draft. He won his first Grey Cup championship while playing for the Ottawa Redblacks in the 104th Grey Cup game.

== College and junior career ==
Medeiros played for the Montreal Carabins for the 2010 and 2011 seasons before moving back to London, Ontario to play for the London Beefeaters of the Canadian Junior Football League. He had a strong season in 2013, which led to him being drafted into the Canadian Football League. After attending training camp with the Edmonton Eskimos, Medeiros transferred to the Western Mustangs football program for the 2014 season, making 20 of 25 field goal attempts and punting 42 times for an average of 39.7 yards per punt.

== Professional career ==
=== Edmonton Eskimos ===
Medeiros was drafted in the sixth round, 48th overall, by the Edmonton Eskimos in the 2014 CFL draft. He attended training camp, but chose to go back to play in Canadian Interuniversity Sport football for the 2014 season. He re-signed with the team on May 13, 2015, but was released during training camp on June 15, 2015.

=== Ottawa Redblacks ===
Medeiros was signed by the Redblacks on June 27, 2016 to play as the team's punter so Chris Milo could focus on placekicking. He played in 13 regular season games, punting 63 times for an average of 43.7 yards per punt. He was eventually replaced by Ray Early, who was also handling the placekicking duties following an injury to Milo, but Medeiros still had kickoff duties in the East Final and Grey Cup games, earning his first championship as part of the 104th Grey Cup winning team. He spent time on the injured list for the 2017 Ottawa Redblacks season and was eventually released on August 17, 2017.

=== Montreal Alouettes ===
On April 25, 2018, it was announced that Medeiros had signed with the Montreal Alouettes. He played in one preseason game on May 31, 2018, missing his only field goal attempt from 37 yards. He was released on June 5, 2018.

=== Toronto Argonauts ===
Medeiros was signed by the Toronto Argonauts on July 30, 2018 following an injury to their incumbent kicker, Ronnie Pfeffer. He played three days later, performing all three kicking duties in the Argonauts' win over his former team, the Redblacks. He finished the 2018 season completing 15 field goals on 20 attempts before being replaced as the team's placekicker by Drew Brown in the 15th game of the season. Medeiros continued to be the team's punter for all but one game after he was signed, finishing with 59 punts for a 46.1 yard average and a 34.9 net yard average. Following the 2018 season, he was re-signed by the Argonauts to a two-year contract extension. However, he was released by the Argonauts on June 8, 2019 as part of final training camp cuts. He was then re-signed again on June 25, 2019 to the practice roster. Medeiros played in eight games for the Argonauts in 2019 as both a placekicker and punter. As a pending free agent in 2020, he was released during the free agency negotiation window on February 7, 2020.
