= St Michael's College, Adelaide =

St Michael's College

Location
- Primary Campus: 78 East Avenue; Beverley, South Australia; Australia Secondary Campus: 15 Mitton Avenue; Henley Beach, South Australia; Australia

Information
- Type: Catholic school
- Motto: Quis ut Deus ("Who is like God")
- Established: 1954; 72 years ago
- Principal: Tony Daley
- Grades: Reception – Year 12
- Enrolment: 2,128 (2024)
- Colours: Maroon; Blue; Gold
- Website: www.smc.sa.edu.au

St Michael's College is a Catholic school in the Lasallian tradition located in the western suburbs of Adelaide, South Australia. The college consists of two campuses; a primary campus located at Beverley for students in Reception to Year 6, and a secondary campus at Henley Beach for students in Year 7 to Year 12. It is a co-educational school that originated as a single-sex school for boys.

== Notable alumni ==
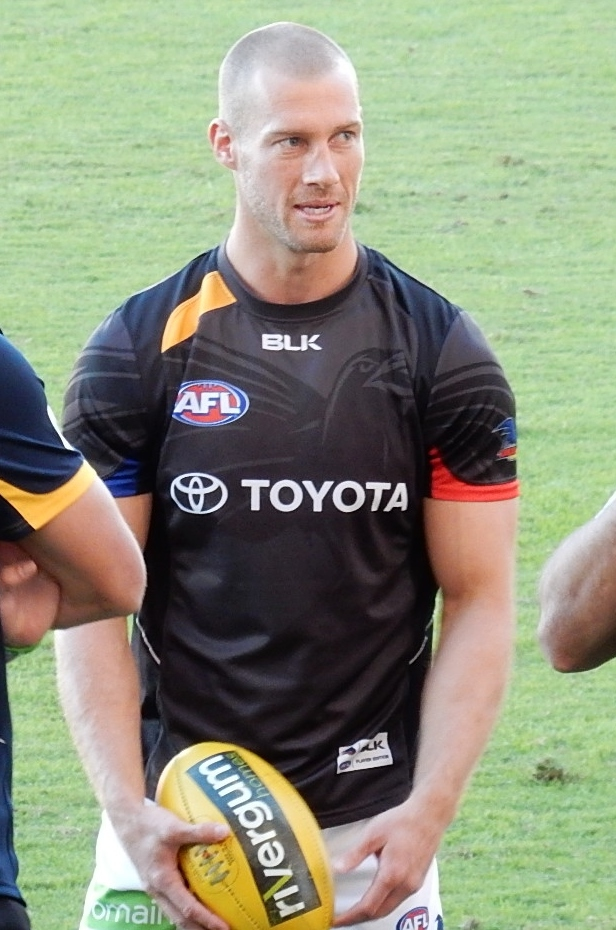
Scott Thompson

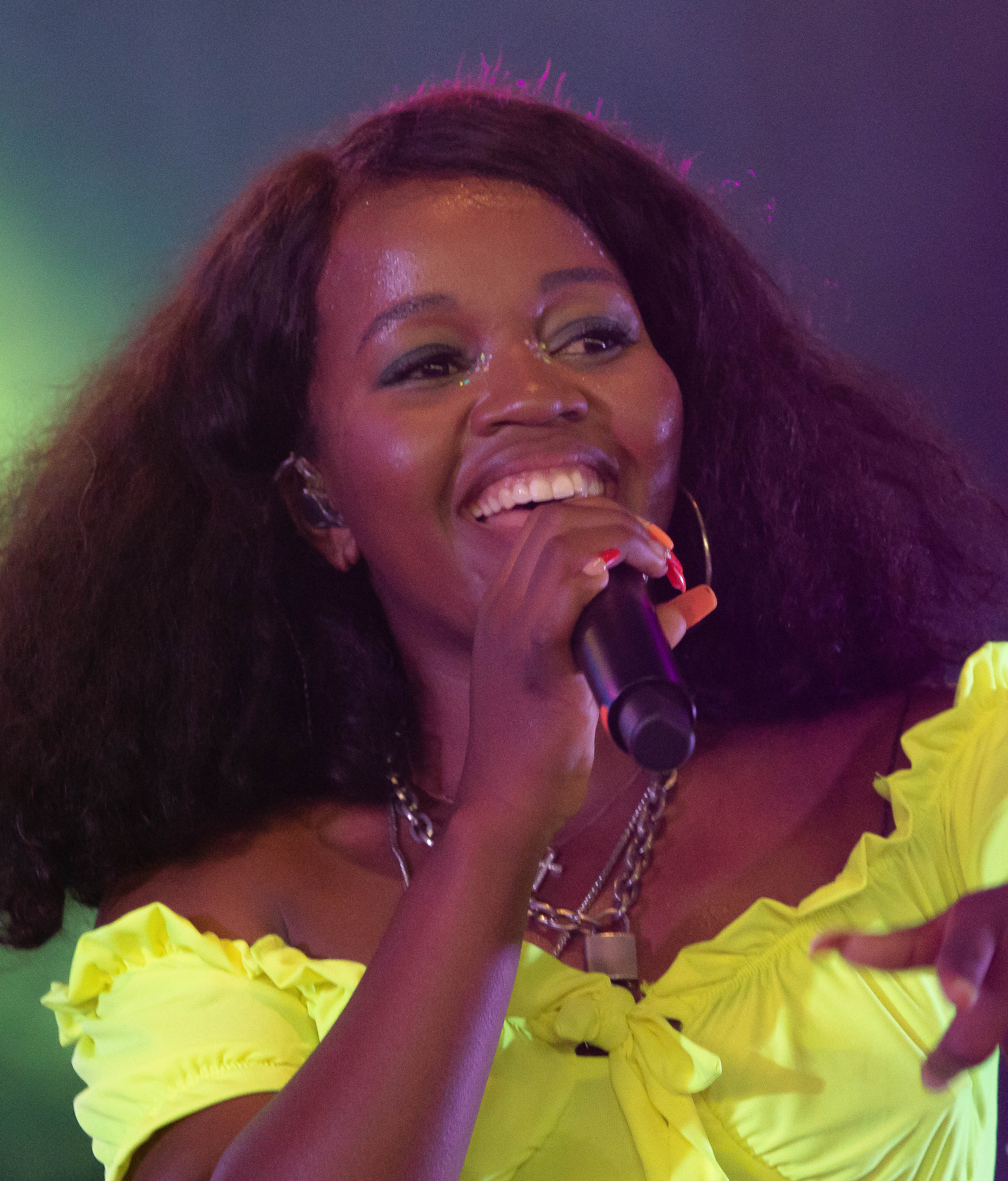
Tkay Maidza

=== Australian rules football ===
- Greg Anderson
- Matthew Broadbent
- Scott Camporeale
- Brad Ebert
- Brett Ebert
- Rachael Killian
- Matthew Kluzek
- Matthew Lokan
- Ebony Marinoff
- Zane Peucker
- Scott Thompson
- Jimmy Toumpas
- Warren Tredrea
- Michael Wilson

=== Other ===
- Jed Altschwager (rower)
- Leon Bignell (politician)
- Darren Cahill (tennis player)
- Elena Carapetis (actress)
- Chris Dittmar (squash player)
- Spencer Johnson (cricketer)
- Daniel Kowalski (swimmer)
- Robert Lau (politician)
- Matt Leo (American football player)
- Tkay Maidza (rapper)
- Chris McHugh (volleyball player)
- Antonio Murdaca (golfer)
- Harry Nielsen (cricketer)
- Chadd Sayers (cricketer)
- Joe Szakacs (politician)
- Maddy Turner (netballer)

== See also ==
- Catholic education in Australia
- List of schools in South Australia
