= Aaron Donkor =

German American football player (born 1995)

Vienna Vikings
- Position: Linebacker
- Roster status: Active
- CFL status: International

Personal information
- Born: March 21, 1995 (age 31); Göttingen, Germany
- Listed height: 6 ft 1 in (1.85 m)
- Listed weight: 240 lb (109 kg)

Career information
- College: NMMI (2016–2018); Arkansas State (2019–2020)
- NFL draft: 2021: undrafted
- CFL draft: 2021G: 3rd round, 21st overall pick

Career history
- Düsseldorf Panther (2016); Seattle Seahawks (2021–2022)*; Houston Roughnecks (2023); Arlington Renegades (2023); Calgary Stampeders (2023); Rhein Fire (2024); Vienna Vikings (2025–present)
- * Offseason or practice squad member only

Awards and highlights
- XFL champion (2023)
- Stats at Pro Football Reference

Aaron Donkor (born March 21, 1995) is a German professional American football linebacker for the Vienna Vikings of the European League of Football (ELF). He played college football for Arkansas State and was signed by the Seattle Seahawks as part of the International Player Pathway Program in 2021.

== Early life ==
Donkor was born on March 21, 1995, in Göttingen to Ghanaian parents. He grew up in Göttingen playing basketball, before later going to Düsseldorf to play professional football in 2016. In 2017, Donkor moved to United States to play college football. He spent his first two years at New Mexico Military Institute, appearing in eight games as a freshman. As a sophomore, Donkor recorded 27 tackles, despite playing just four games. He also made 11.5 sacks that season. He transferred to the Division I Arkansas State University as a junior in 2019. Playing in six games, Donkor made 25 tackles. The 2020 season was canceled due to COVID-19.

== Professional career ==
=== Düsseldorf Panther ===
As a 21-year-old in 2016, Donkor played professional football in Germany's top league for the Düsseldorf Panther. He led the German Football League that year with 14 sacks, 74 tackles, and 20 tackles-for-loss.

=== Seattle Seahawks ===
In 2021, Donkor was signed by the Seattle Seahawks as part of the International Player Pathway Program (IPPP). Though 26 years old as a National Football League (NFL) rookie, he "made a strong impression" in training camp. He was placed on the international/exempt list to start the season. He signed a reserve/future contract with the Seahawks on January 10, 2022.

On August 28, 2022, Donkor was waived by the Seahawks and re-signed to the practice squad.

=== Houston Roughnecks ===
Donkor signed with the Houston Roughnecks of the XFL on February 28, 2023. He was released on March 27, 2023.

=== Arlington Renegades ===
Donkor signed with the Arlington Renegades of the XFL on April 14, 2023. He was released on June 15, 2023.

=== Calgary Stampeders ===
On July 2, 2023, Donkor was signed by the Calgary Stampeders of the CFL. He was placed on the Suspended List the same day.

=== Rhein Fire ===
Donkor signed with the Rhein Fire of the European League of Football in 2024.

=== Vienna Vikings ===
On May 26, 2025, Donkor signed with the Vienna Vikings of the European League of Football.
