= Tanner Cadwallader =

Canadian gridiron football player (born 1997)

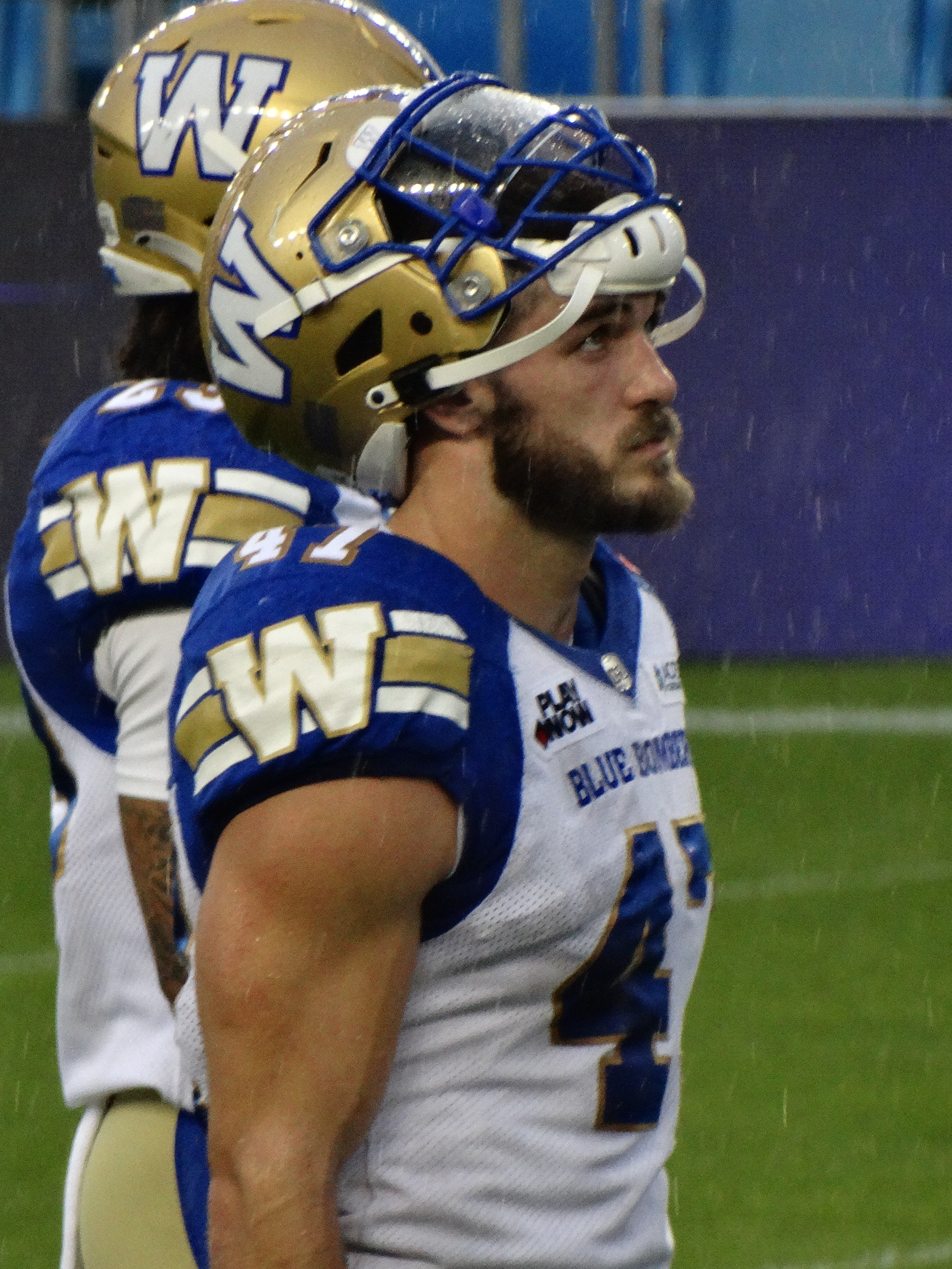
- Cadwallader with the Winnipeg Blue Bombers in 2025

No. 47 – Winnipeg Blue Bombers
- Position: Linebacker
- Roster status: Active
- CFL status: National

Personal information
- Born: June 24, 1997 (age 29); Georgetown, Ontario, Canada
- Listed height: 5 ft 11 in (1.80 m)
- Listed weight: 220 lb (100 kg)

Career information
- CJFL: London Beefeaters
- University: Western; Wilfrid Laurier
- CFL draft: 2020: 7th round, 64th overall pick

Career history
- 2019: Warriors Bologna
- 2021–present: Winnipeg Blue Bombers

Awards and highlights
- Grey Cup champion (2021)
- Stats at CFL.ca

Tanner Gaskill-Cadwallader (born June 24, 1997) is a Canadian professional football linebacker for the Winnipeg Blue Bombers of the Canadian Football League (CFL).

== Amateur career ==
=== Western Mustangs ===
Cadwallader first played U Sports football with the Western Mustangs in 2015, joining the team as a wide receiver. However, he was only with the Mustangs for one year as he sought a transfer to be closer to home with his mother, Delia, who was sick with cancer.

=== Wilfrid Laurier Golden Hawks ===
In 2017, Cadwallader joined the Wilfrid Laurier Golden Hawks and changed positions to defensive back. He played in 13 regular season games for the Golden Hawks over three season where he had 22 solo tackles, two assisted tackles, three interceptions, and two sacks. He also played in the 2016 Yates Cup championship win over the Western Mustangs and the following Mitchell Bowl loss to the Laval Rouge et Or. He graduated from Wilfrid Laurier and did not play again for the Golden Hawks for a fourth year, despite retaining playing eligibility.

=== Bologna Warriors ===
As a European import due to his parents being from the United Kingdom, Cadwallader was able to play for the Bologna Warriors of the Italian Football League in spring 2019.

=== London Beefeaters ===
Cadwallader joined the London Beefeaters of the Canadian Junior Football League for the 2019 season. He was named a CJFL All-Star after recording 16 tackles, two assisted tackles, three interceptions with one touchdown, and two sacks.

== Professional career ==
Cadwallader was drafted in the seventh round, 64th overall, by the Winnipeg Blue Bombers in the 2020 CFL draft but did not play in 2020 due to the cancellation of the 2020 CFL season. Instead, it was announced on January 12, 2021, that he had signed with the team to his rookie contract. He made the team's active roster following training camp in 2021 and played in his first career professional game on August 5, 2021, against the Hamilton Tiger-Cats. Cadwallader played in all 14 regular season games where he had one defensive tackle, eight special teams tackles, and one forced fumble. He made his post-season debut that year as he played in the West Final against the Saskatchewan Roughriders where he had one forced fumble. He also played in his first Grey Cup game where he had three special teams tackles as the Blue Bombers defeated the Tiger-Cats to win the 108th Grey Cup championship.

== Personal life ==
Cadwallader's mother, Delia, died of cancer in May 2017. He has three older brothers.
