= Zane Peucker =

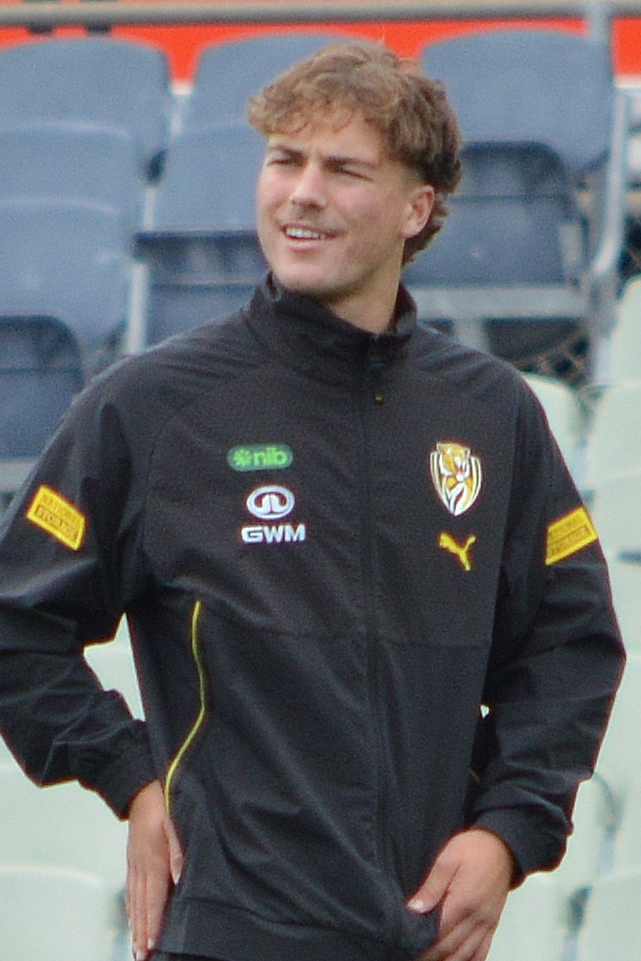
- Peucker in April 2026

Personal information
- Born: 4 December 2007 (age 18)
- Original teams: Sturt (SANFL); Port District (AdFL)
- Draft: No. 31, 2025 AFL draft
- Debut: Round 18, 2026, Richmond vs. Melbourne, at MCG
- Height: 178 cm (5 ft 10 in)
- Position: Forward

Club information
- Current club: Richmond
- Number: 26

Playing career^{1}
Years	Club	Games (Goals)
2026–	Richmond	2 (1)
- ^{1} Playing statistics correct to the end of 2026.

Career highlights
- U18 National Champion: 2025

Zane Peucker (born 4 December 2007) is a professional Australian rules footballer who plays for the Richmond Football Club in the Australian Football League (AFL). A small forward, Peucker was drafted in the second round of the 2025 AFL draft and made his debut late in the 2026 season.

== Early life and junior football ==
Peucker played junior football with Port District Football Club in the junior ranks of the Adelaide Footy League and attended school at St Michael's College in Adelaide's western suburbs.

Peucker played junior representative football for Woodville-West Torrens Football Club, winning a premiership in the Under 18 division of the South Australian National Football League while averaging 13 disposals per game in 2024. He had previously won an under 16s premiership with the club in 2022.

He returned to Woodville-West Torrens in 2025 and played a starring role in the Under 18s side, finishing his junior season averaging 24.8 disposals and 1.3 goals over 12 games in a key midfield role. Peucker was selected for state-representative football that year, adopting a forward role in the higher-standard competition. He was a member of the championship winning South Australia side at the Under 18 National Championships and kicked a goal in each of four matches at the tournament.

Prior to the 2025 AFL draft, Peucker was projected to be taken with the 46th overall pick by ESPN and was rated as the 94th best available player by Fox Sports.

== AFL career ==
Peucker was drafted by Richmond with the club's third selection and the 31st pick overall in the 2025 AFL draft.

He made his first appearance for the club in an informal pre-season match against Essendon in February 2026, before spending the early months of the 2026 season with the club's reserves side in the VFL. He suffered a syndesmosis injury in an exhibition match against the AFL Under 18 Academy team in April, rehabbing the injury through early June before making his return to reserves grade football. After having played seven VFL matches with averages of 15.4 disposals and one goal per game, Peucker was named to make his AFL debut in early July, in the round 18 match against Melbourne at the MCG.

== Player profile ==
Peucker plays a score impact small forward. Prior to being drafted he compared himself to midfielder forwards Zac Bailey and Rhylee West. As a junior, he played as a midfielder and a forward and was noticeable for his speed and power in both roles.

== Personal life ==
Peucker's father Simon Peucker played SANFL senior football with North Adelaide and Port Adelaide in the 1990s and 2000s.

== Statistics ==
Updated to the end of round 22, 2026.

Legend
G	Goals	K	Kicks	D	Disposals	T	Tackles
B	Behinds	H	Handballs	M	Marks

Season	Team	No.	Games	Totals							Averages (per game)							Votes
Season	Team	No.	Games	G	B	K	H	D	M	T	G	B	K	H	D	M	T	Votes
2026	Richmond	26	2	1	0	15	2	17	9	1	0.5	0.0	7.5	1.0	8.5	4.5	0.5	0
Career			2	1	0	15	2	17	9	1	0.5	0.0	7.5	1.0	8.5	4.5	0.5	0
