= Hakeem Johnson =

Canadian gridiron football player (born 1994)

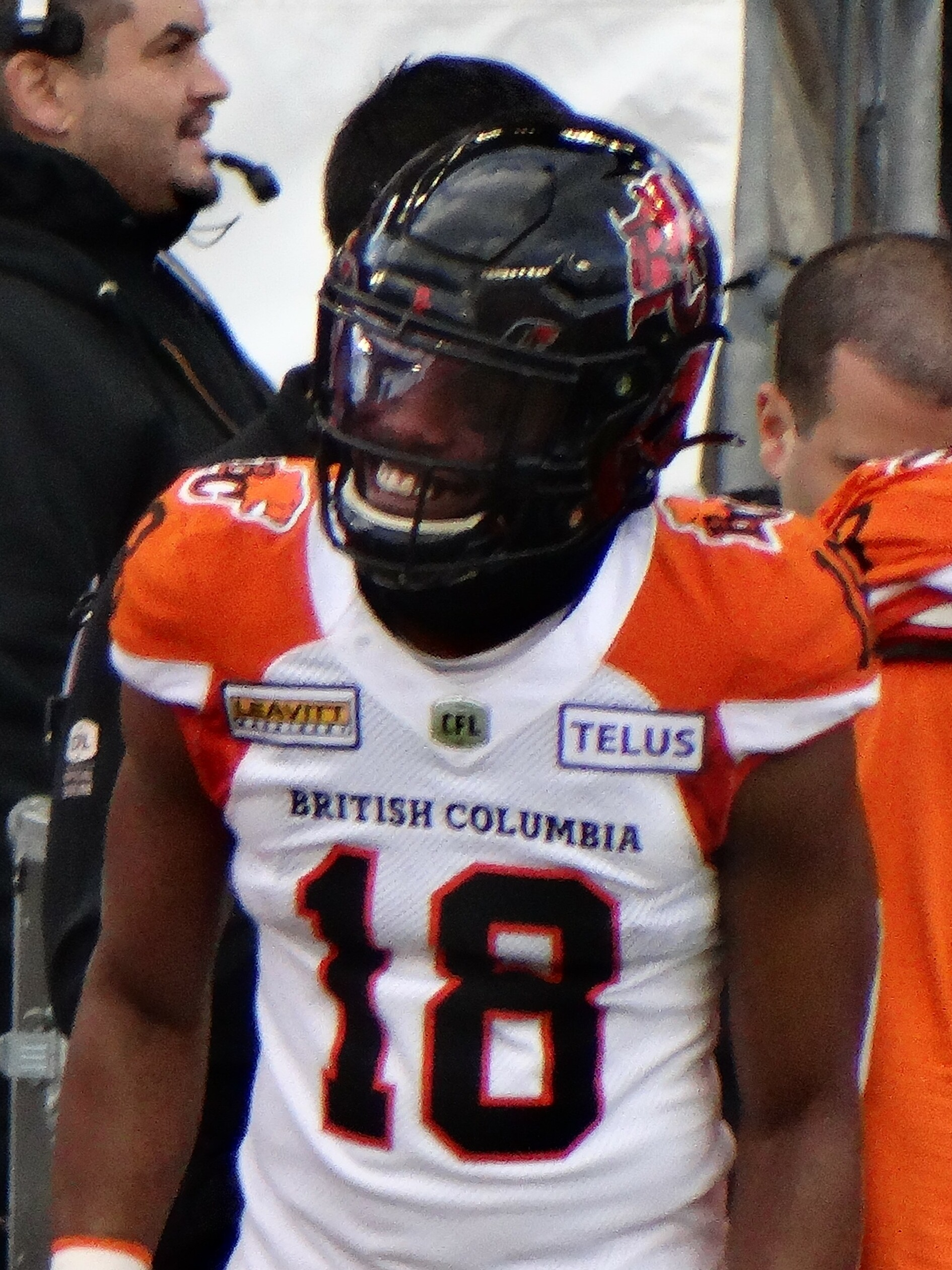
- Johnson with the BC Lions in 2022

Profile
- Position: Defensive back

Personal information
- Born: June 14, 1994 (age 32); Brampton, Ontario
- Listed height: 6 ft 0 in (1.83 m)
- Listed weight: 190 lb (86 kg)

Career information
- High school: St. Edmund Campion
- CJFL: London Beefeaters
- University: Western Ontario
- CFL draft: 2019: 4th round, 33rd overall pick

Career history
- 2019–2022: BC Lions
- 2023: Edmonton Elks*
- * Offseason or practice squad member only

Awards and highlights
- Yates Cup champion (2017); Vanier Cup champion (2017)
- Stats at CFL.ca

Hakeem Johnson (born June 14, 1994) is a Canadian professional football defensive back. He previously played for the BC Lions of the Canadian Football League (CFL).

== Junior career ==
Following his high school playing career, Johnson played in the Canadian Junior Football League for the London Beefeaters from 2014 to 2015.

== University career ==
Johnson played U Sports football for the Western Mustangs from 2016 to 2018. He was part of the 2017 Vanier Cup championship team where he was named an OUA second-team all-star that year. However, he suffered an ACL injury in the 2017 Yates Cup victory over the Wilfrid Laurier Golden Hawks, which kept him sidelined for the entire 2018 season. With the Mustangs, he played in 16 games where he had 22 tackles and three interceptions.

== Professional career ==
Pre-draft measurables
Height	Weight	40-yard dash	20-yard shuttle	Three-cone drill	Vertical jump	Broad jump
6 ft 0 3/8 in (1.84 m)	193 lb (88 kg)	4.63 s	4.24 s	6.75 s	33.5 in (0.85 m)	9 ft 10 in (3.00 m)
All values from CFL Combine

=== BC Lions ===
Johnson was drafted in the fourth round, 33rd overall, by the BC Lions in the 2019 CFL draft and signed with the team on May 16, 2019. Following the team's training camp in 2019, he was assigned to the practice roster. He then made his professional debut on September 6, 2019, against the Montreal Alouettes. He played in eight regular season games in 2019 where he had three defensive tackles and one special teams tackle.

Due to the cancellation of the 2020 CFL season, Johnson did not play in 2020. He made the team's opening day roster in 2021 and played in all 14 regular season games. He made his first professional start on October 23, 2021, against the Winnipeg Blue Bombers where he had two tackles on defence. In the final game of the season, on November 19, 2021, he recorded his first career interception in a game against the Edmonton Elks when he picked off Dakota Prukop. In the 14 games that he played, he started in three, and recorded 12 defensive tackles, four special teams tackles, and one interception.

Johnson again made the team's active roster following training camp in 2022 and dressed as a backup defensive back. He played in 16 regular season games where he recorded three defensive tackles and four special teams tackles.

=== Edmonton Elks ===
Johnson joined the Edmonton Elks in free agency on February 17, 2023. However, he was released after the second preseason game on May 28, 2023.

== Personal life ==
Johnson's brother, Shaq Johnson, also plays professional football, but as a wide receiver. The two brothers played together for the Lions from 2019 to 2021 and were the fifth set of brothers to play for the Lions, but the first to play on opposite sides of the ball.
