= Shaq Johnson =

Canadian football wide receiver

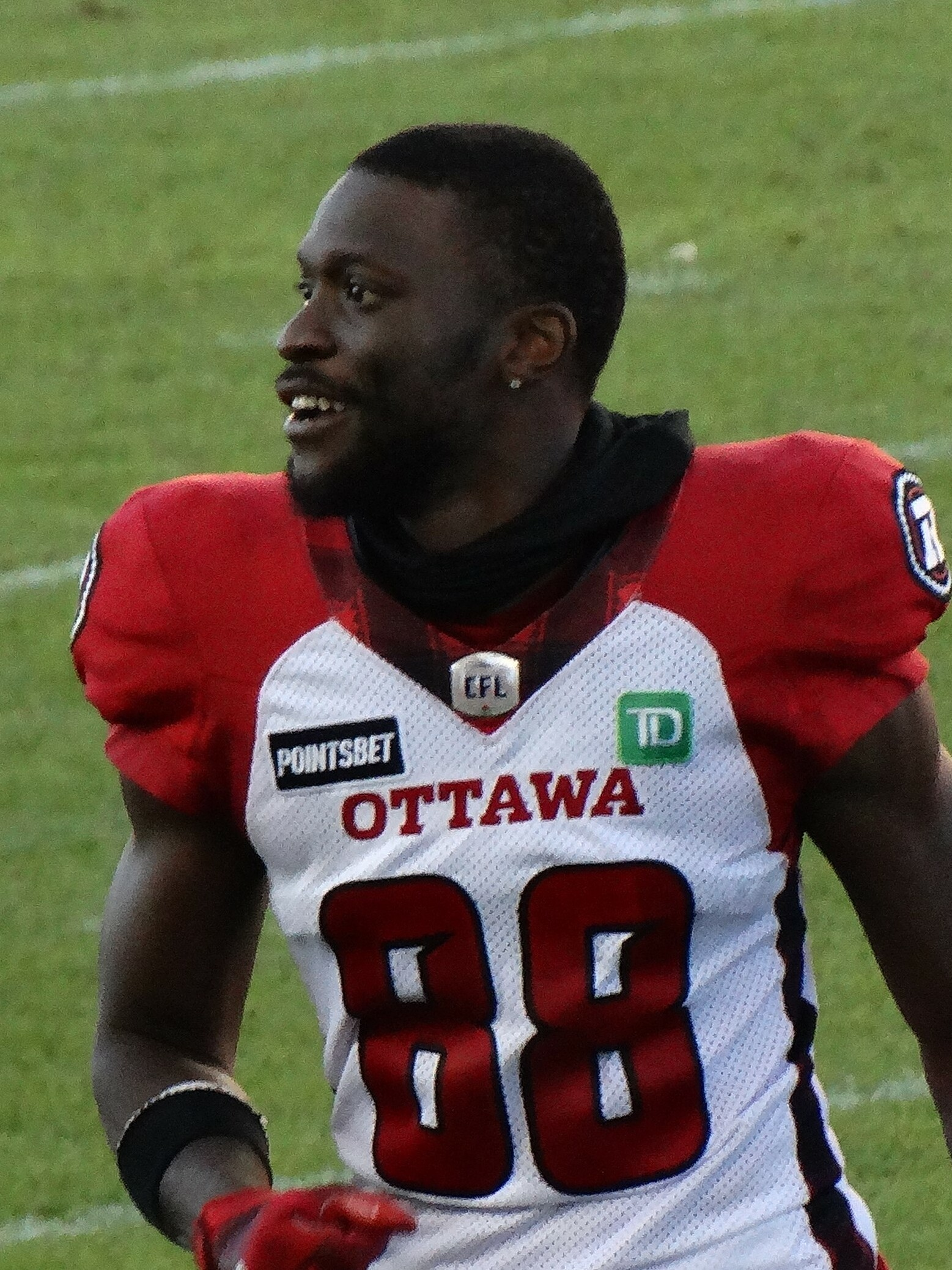
- Johnson with the Ottawa Redblacks in 2022

Profile
- Position: Wide receiver

Personal information
- Born: May 2, 1993 (age 33); Brampton, Ontario, Canada
- Listed height: 6 ft 0 in (1.83 m)
- Listed weight: 178 lb (81 kg)

Career information
- High school: Brampton (ON) Notre Dame
- CJFL: GTA Grizzlies; London Beefeaters
- University: McGill; Western
- CFL draft: 2016: 4th round, 32nd overall pick

Career history
- 2016–2021: BC Lions
- 2022: Ottawa Redblacks

Awards and highlights
- Peter Gorman Trophy (2012)
- Stats at CFL.ca

Shaquille Johnson (born May 2, 1993) is a Canadian professional football wide receiver. He has played for the BC Lions and Ottawa Redblacks of the Canadian Football League (CFL).

== University and junior football ==
Johnson began his university football career with the McGill Redmen in 2012 and was awarded the Peter Gorman Trophy as the rookie of the year. He sat out for a year to help his mother, who was raising three other children on her own, during which time he played for the GTA Grizzlies of the Canadian Junior Football League (CJFL). He then went on to play for the Western Mustangs of the University of Western Ontario and the London Beefeaters of the CJFL. Johnson, who started playing competitive football in grade 10, credits a football camp at the University of Pittsburgh in his senior year of high school with helping him to realize he had the skills to succeed in the sport.

== Professional career ==
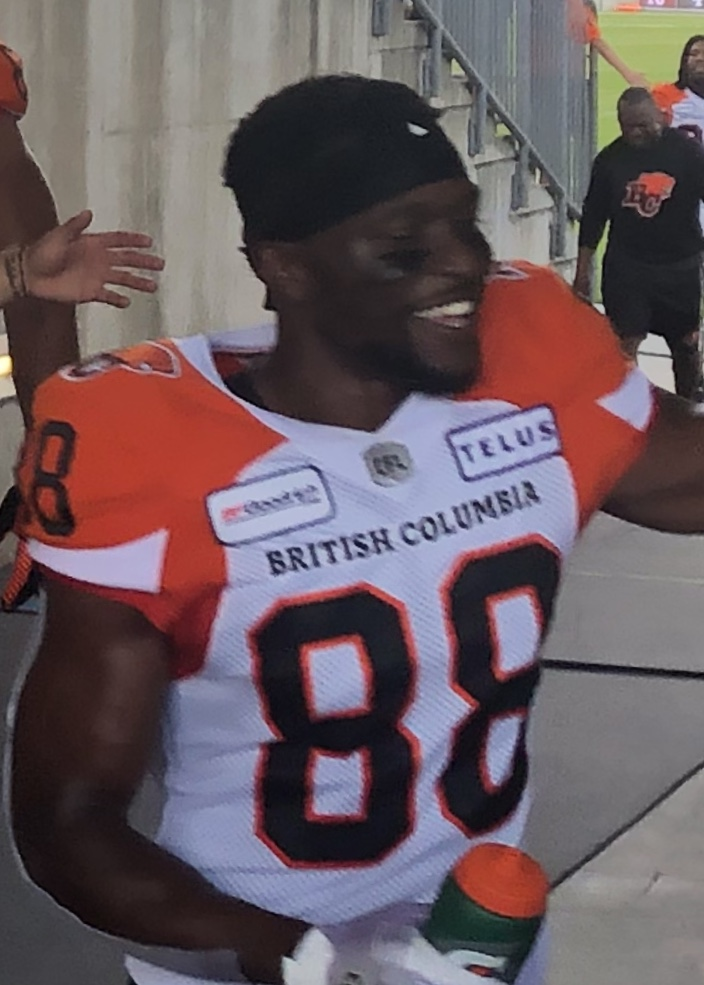
Johnson with the BC Lions in 2019

=== BC Lions ===
Johnson ran a 4.39 time at the 40-yard dash at a regional CFL combine before being drafted by the BC Lions in the fourth round of the 2016 CFL draft. He spent most of the 2016 season, on the practice roster before playing in two games with no receptions. Through 15 games in the 2017 season, Johnson had 27 catches with 501 yards and two touchdowns, placing him third on the team in receiving yardage. On January 21, 2021, Johnson signed an extension with the Lions. He played in all 14 regular season games in 2021 where he had 30 catches for 295 yards. He became a free agent upon the expiry of his contract on February 8, 2022.

=== Ottawa Redblacks ===
On February 9, 2022, it was announced that Johnson had signed with the Ottawa Redblacks. On February 14, 2023, Johnson became a free agent.

== Personal life ==
Johnson's brother, Hakeem Johnson, also plays professional football, but as a defensive back. The two brothers played together for the Lions from 2019 to 2021 and were the fifth set of brothers to play for the Lions, but the first to play on opposite sides of the ball.
