= Steven Nielsen =

Danish gridiron football player (born 1996)

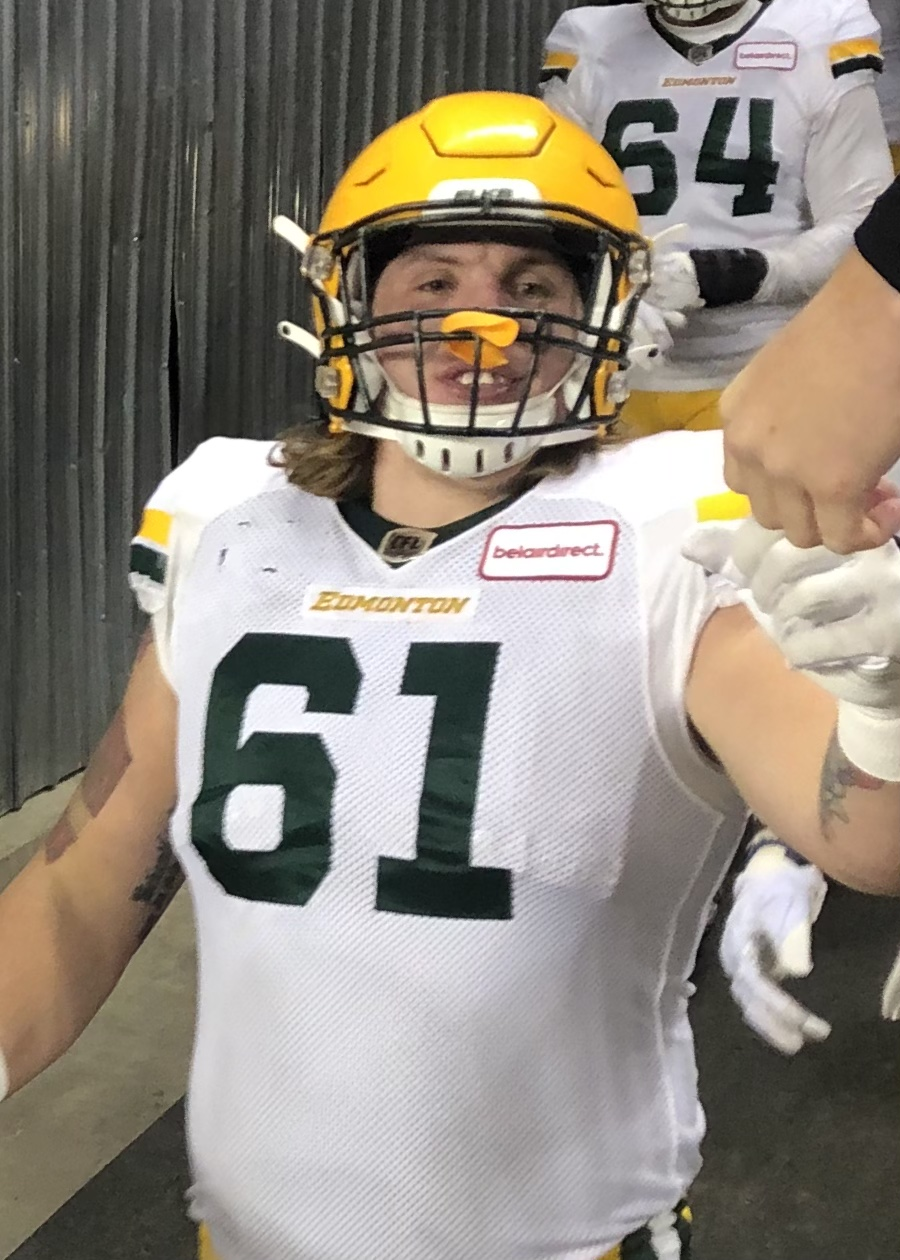
- Nielsen with the Edmonton Elks in 2021

No. 74 – Frankfurt Galaxy
- Position: Offensive lineman
- Roster status: Active
- CFL status: Global

Personal information
- Born: June 6, 1996 (age 30); Dragør, Denmark
- Listed height: 6 ft 8 in (2.03 m)
- Listed weight: 307 lb (139 kg)

Career information
- High school: La Lumiere (La Porte, Indiana, U.S.)
- College: Eastern Michigan
- CFL draft: 2021G: 1st round, 2nd overall pick

Career history
- 2020: Jacksonville Jaguars*
- 2021–2022: Edmonton Elks
- 2023: Raiders Tirol
- 2024 - present: Frankfurt Galaxy
- * Offseason or practice squad member only
- Stats at CFL.ca

Steven Christoffer Nielsen (born June 6, 1996) is a Danish professional gridiron football offensive lineman for the Frankfurt Galaxy of the European League of Football (ELF).

== College career ==
Nielsen played college football for the Eastern Michigan Eagles from 2016 to 2019. He played in 49 games over his four-year tenure with the team.

== Professional career ==
=== Jacksonville Jaguars ===
Nielsen signed as an undrafted free agent with the Jacksonville Jaguars on April 26, 2020. However, he was released on August 8, 2020.

=== Edmonton Elks ===
After becoming eligible for the 2021 CFL global draft, Nielsen was drafted second overall by the Edmonton Football Team and signed with the team on April 29, 2021. He made the active roster for the newly named Elks, following their training camp, and played in his first professional game on August 7, 2021, against the Ottawa Redblacks. He later earned his first career start on November 5, 2021, against the Saskatchewan Roughriders. He played in 13 out of 14 regular season games in 2021.

=== Raiders Tirol ===
On 17 November 2022, Raiders Tirol of the European League of Football announced they have signed Nielsen for the 2023 season.

== Personal life ==
Nielsen was born to parents Flemming and Tina Nielsen and has two brothers, Kevin and Teddy.
