= Michael Reilly (quarterback) =

American football player (born 1985)

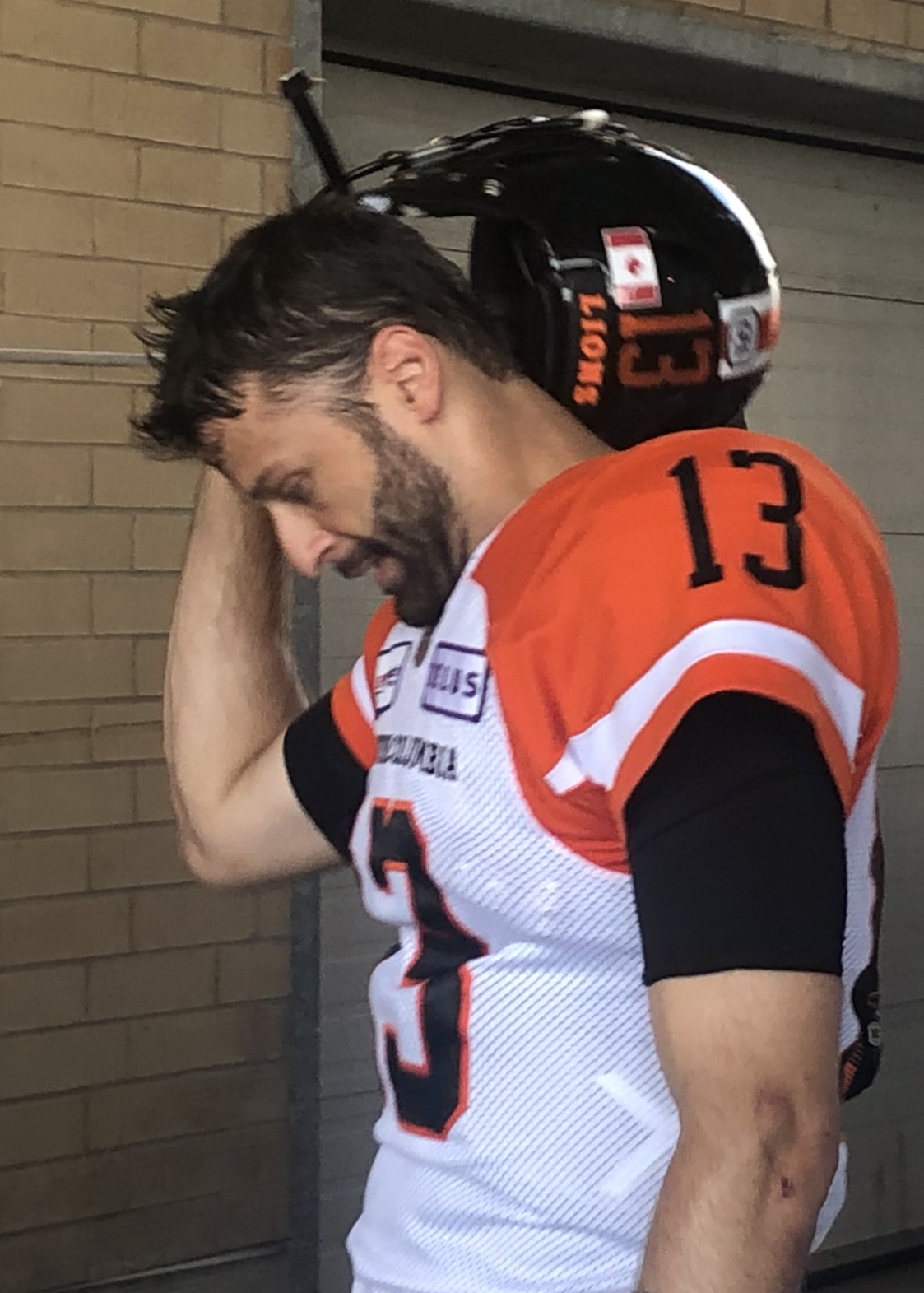
- Reilly before a BC Lions game in 2019

No. 13
- Position: Quarterback

Personal information
- Born: January 25, 1985 (age 41); Kennewick, Washington, U.S.
- Listed height: 6 ft 3 in (1.91 m)
- Listed weight: 230 lb (104 kg)

Career information
- High school: Flathead (Kalispell, Montana)
- College: Central Washington
- NFL draft: 2009: undrafted

Career history
- 2009: Pittsburgh Steelers*
- 2009: Green Bay Packers*
- 2009: St. Louis Rams*
- 2010: Seattle Seahawks*
- 2010–2012: BC Lions
- 2013–2018: Edmonton Eskimos
- 2019–2021: BC Lions
- * Offseason or practice squad member only

Awards and highlights
- 2× Grey Cup champion (2011, 2015); Grey Cup MVP (2015); CFL's Most Outstanding Player Award (2017); Jeff Nicklin Memorial Trophy (2017); CFL All-Star (2017); 2× CFL West All-Star (2014, 2017); 4× CFL passing yards leader (2016–2018, 2021); CFL passing touchdowns leader (2017); CFL rushing touchdowns leader (2017); Third-team Little All-American (2008); 2× First-team All-GNAC (2007–2008); 2× Second-team All-GNAC (2006–2007); GNAC Offensive P.O.Y. (2008)

Career CFL statistics
- Passing completions: 2,772
- Passing attempts: 4,134
- Completion percentage: 67.1
- Passing yards: 34,805
- TD–INT: 182–105
- Stats at CFL.ca

Michael Reilly (born January 25, 1985), previously known as Mike Reilly, is an American former professional football player who was a quarterback in the Canadian Football League (CFL) for 11 seasons. He was the starting quarterback for the Edmonton Eskimos when they won the 103rd Grey Cup and was named the Grey Cup Most Valuable Player. He was originally signed by the Pittsburgh Steelers of the National Football League (NFL) as an undrafted free agent in 2009. He played college football for the Central Washington Wildcats. He was named the CFL's Most Outstanding Player in 2017. Reilly was also a member of the BC Lions of the CFL and the NFL's Green Bay Packers, St. Louis Rams and Seattle Seahawks.

== Early life ==
Reilly played three seasons for Kamiakin High School in Kennewick, Washington, before relocating to Kalispell, Montana. As a senior, he set a Flathead High School record with 2,280 yards. He originally signed with NAIA Montana Tech, but chose to walk on at Washington State University before transferring to Central Washington.

== College career ==
After redshirting at Washington State as a 5th-string quarterback, Reilly decided he didn't want to bide his time waiting for playing time. Central Washington offered him a chance to start right away so he transferred.

In 2005, Reilly started all 10 games and was 223/353 (63.2%) for 2,686 yards 30 TDs and 11 interceptions and rushed 86 times for 310 yards (3.6 avg.) with three touchdowns, while being named First-team All-Great NW. In 2006, he started all 11 games and was 231/351 (65.8%) for 2,660 yards 21 TDs and 12 Ints., rushed 137 times for 272 yards (2.0 avg.) with four touchdowns and was named Second-team All-North Central. In 2007, Reilly started all 13 games and completed 271 of 435 passes (62.3%) for 3,386 yards, 30 touchdowns and 10 interceptions while be named Second-team All-North Central. He also rushed 129 times for 266 yards (2.1 avg.) with three touchdowns. He was the 2008 Great Northwest Athletic Conference Offensive Player of the Year after completing 65.2% of his passes (207 of 414) in 2008 for 3,706 passing with 37 TDs, six INTs and he rushed 103 times for 415 yards (4.0 avg.) with four touchdowns. He was also named First-team All Great NW for his efforts. He was also Third-team Little All-America.

Reilly was a co-runner-up for the Harlon Hill Trophy, which is presented to the nation's top Division II football player, as a senior. He threw a touchdown pass in all 46 games of his college career, giving him the NCAA all-divisions record for consecutive games with a touchdown pass. This record would be tied in 2014 by Marshall's Rakeem Cato. Reilly completed 64 percent of his passes over his four years as a starter for 12,448 yards, 118 touchdowns and only 40 interceptions.

== Professional career ==
Pre-draft measurables
Height	Weight	40-yard dash	10-yard split	20-yard split	20-yard shuttle	Three-cone drill	Vertical jump	Broad jump	Wonderlic
6 ft 3 in (1.91 m)	214 lb (97 kg)	4.74 s	1.62 s	2.71 s	4.11 s	6.76 s	32 1/2	9 ft 1 in (2.77 m)	38
40 (and splits) and vertical from Pro Day, all others from NFL Combine.

=== Pittsburgh Steelers ===
Reilly was eligible to be selected in the 2009 NFL draft, but went undrafted. He signed a free agent contract with the Pittsburgh Steelers. Reilly completed 10-of-15 for 117 yards during the 2009 preseason, but was waived on September 5, 2009.

=== Green Bay Packers ===
On November 19, 2009, Reilly was signed to the Green Bay Packers practice squad.

=== St. Louis Rams ===
On December 9, 2009, he was signed off the Packers' practice squad by the St. Louis Rams. He was waived on May 4, 2010.

=== Seattle Seahawks ===
Reilly was claimed off waivers by the Seattle Seahawks on May 4, 2010. He was waived on May 18, 2010.

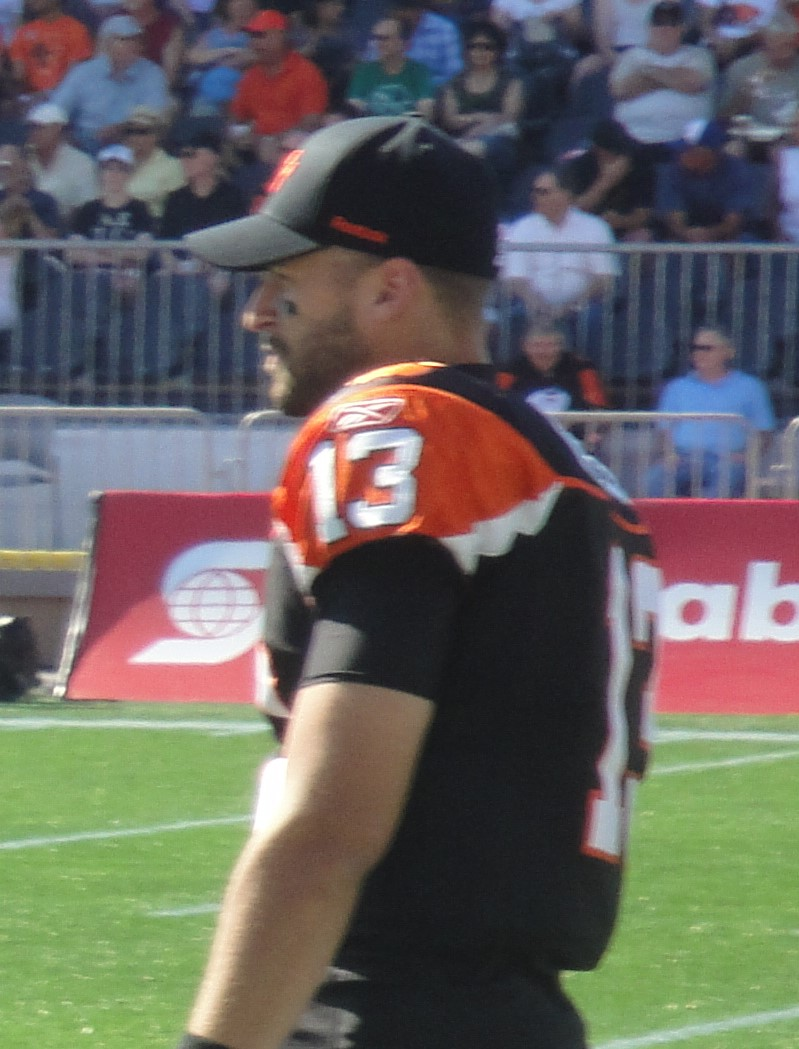
Reilly before a Lions game in 2011.

=== BC Lions ===
On July 26, 2010, it was announced that Reilly had signed a practice roster agreement with the BC Lions. On August 26, 2010, Reilly was activated by the Lions and spent the remainder of the year as the third-string quarterback. He dressed for all 18 games in 2011 as the third-string quarterback and shared in the Lions' 99th Grey Cup victory. He got his first pro start on October 19, 2012, against the Edmonton Eskimos due to an injury to Travis Lulay. Reilly completed 19 of 28 throwing attempts for 276 yards with two touchdowns and one interception, leading the Lions to a victory over the Edmonton Eskimos 39–19. The win clinched a first round bye for the BC Lions in the 100th Grey Cup Playoffs.

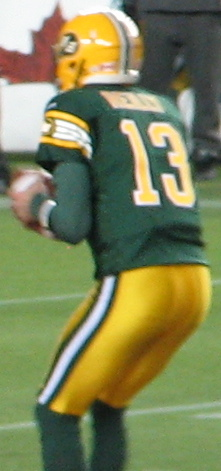
Reilly with the Edmonton Eskimos in 2013.

=== Edmonton Eskimos ===
On January 31, 2013, Reilly was traded to the Edmonton Eskimos by the BC Lions; the trade included the exchange of the clubs' second round picks in the 2013 CFL draft and the Lions receiving the Eskimos' second round pick in the 2014 CFL draft. Entering the 2013 CFL season, Reilly was in open competition with Matt Nichols for the starting quarterback job. Nichols tore his ACL in preseason which made Reilly the starting QB for the season. On August 18, 2013, Reilly threw for over 500 yards in a losing cause, the fourth highest performance for yards passing in a single game in the history of the Eskimos football club. In his first season as a full-time starter in the CFL, Reilly threw for 4,207 yards, with 24 touchdowns and 18 interceptions. He also finished 5th in the league in rushing yards with 709. Despite his efforts, the Eskimos struggled all season finishing with a record of 4–14 and missing the playoffs.

In the 2014 season, Reilly played in 15 regular season games, leading the Eskimos to the number two seed in the Western Division with a record of 12–6. After defeating the Saskatchewan Roughriders in the Western semi-finals, Reilly and the Eskimos were defeated by the Stampeders 43–18, ending their season. It was revealed after the game that Reilly had been playing with a broken bone in his foot and had been in great pain. The injury had been caused in a previous game during the regular season.

Reilly's third season with Eskimos was once again hampered by injuries, missing 8 games. He played in the first game of the season, and the last 9; winning 8 in a row to finish the season as the first seed in the West Division. Reilly completed 214 of 329 pass attempts for 2,449 yards with 15 touchdowns and 10 interceptions (passer rating of 89.8). On November 29, 2015, the Eskimos won the 103rd Grey Cup with a score of 26–20 over the Ottawa RedBlacks in Winnipeg, Manitoba. After the game, he received the Grey Cup Most Valuable Player award after completing 21-of-35 pass attempts for 269 yards, two touchdowns and no interceptions. On April 14, 2016, the Eskimos announced they had signed Reilly to a contract extension through the 2018 CFL season. The three-year deal is reportedly worth over $400,000 in 2016 and then bumps up to over $500,000 in following seasons. Reilly continued his stellar play in the following three seasons, throwing for over 5,500 yards each season while tossing 88 touchdowns and 43 interceptions.

Set to become a free agent in February 2019, Reilly had a workout with the Jacksonville Jaguars in mid-December 2018.

=== Return to BC Lions ===
On February 12, 2019, Reilly became a free agent and subsequently signed a four-year contract with the BC Lions later that day. Despite lofty expectations to start the season the Lions only won one of their first 11 games. Reilly was able to lead the Lions to four consecutive victories pulling the Lions into a playoff race with his former team. However, Reilly suffered a wrist injury early in Week 18 against the Eskimos who would win the match and eliminate the Lions from playoff contention. Reilly underwent surgery in the days following and was declared out for the remainder of the season.

In November 2020, Reilly filed a grievance against the BC Lions claiming a portion of his salary was guaranteed, even though the 2020 season was cancelled due to the COVID-19 pandemic. He reached a settlement with the team and subsequently re-signed to a new contract through the 2022 season on December 17, 2020. In June 2021, it was reported that Reilly wished to go by his birthname Michael instead of Mike to honor his recently deceased mother, who did not like the name Mike. After beginning the 2021 season with lingering injury issues, Reilly finished the year with 12 starts in 13 games played and passed for a league-leading 3,283 yards. On January 24, 2022, the Lions announced that Reilly had retired.

== CFL career statistics ==
=== Regular season ===
		Passing									Rushing
Year	Team	GD	GS	Att	Comp	Pct	Yards	TD	Int	QBR	Att	Yards	Avg	Long	TD	Fumb
2010	BC	4	0	0	0	0.0	0	0	0	0.0	0	0	0.0	0	0	0
2011	BC	18	0	2	1	50.0	12	0	0	68.8	0	0	0.0	0	0	0
2012	BC	18	2	75	52	69.3	682	4	2	104.4	34	122	3.6	18	2	4
2013	EDM	18	18	512	305	59.6	4,207	24	18	86.9	84	709	8.4	45	1	5
2014	EDM	17	15	446	288	62.4	3,327	16	11	88.7	79	616	7.8	30	8	4
2015	EDM	10	9	329	214	65.0	2,449	15	10	89.8	66	324	4.9	22	2	2
2016	EDM	18	17	633	448	70.8	5,554	28	12	104.5	102	406	4.0	19	9	6
2017	EDM	18	18	654	447	68.3	5,830	30	13	103.2	97	390	4.0	28	12	7
2018	EDM	18	18	621	418	67.3	5,562	30	18	99.5	120	595	5.0	19	13	8
2019	BC	16	16	463	322	69.5	3,897	20	15	96.0	55	204	3.7	27	5	8
2020	BC	Season cancelled									Season cancelled
2021	BC	13	12	400	276	69.0	3,283	14	6	99.2	41	200	4.9	18	4	4
CFL totals		168	125	4,134	2,772	67.1	34,805	182	105	99.2	678	3,566	5.3	45	56	54

=== Playoffs ===
Year & game	Team	GP	GS	ATT	COMP	YD	TD	INT	RUSH	YD	TD
2010 West Semi-Final	BC	1	0	0	-	-	-	-	0	-	-
2011 West Final	BC	1	0	0	-	-	-	-	0	-	-
2012 West Final	BC	1	0	1	1	26	0	0	3	13	0
2014 West Semi-Final	EDM	1	0	8	6	53	0	0	3	6	0
2014 West Final	EDM	1	1	33	20	216	2	1	5	17	0
2015 West Final	EDM	1	1	39	31	370	3	0	7	30	2
2016 *East Semi-Final	EDM	1	1	19	10	133	0	0	5	20	0
2016 *East Final	EDM	1	1	41	20	340	3	0	0	-	-
2017 West Semi-Final	EDM	1	1	33	23	334	3	0	7	32	0
2017 West Final	EDM	1	1	38	23	348	1	1	6	14	1
Totals		10	6	212	134	1,820	12	2	36	132	3

*team qualified for crossover

=== Grey Cup ===
Year	Team	GP	GS	ATT	COMP	YD	TD	INT	RUSH	YD	TD
2011	BC	1	0	0	-	-	-	-	0	-	-
2015	EDM	1	1	35	21	269	2	0	10	66	0
Totals		2	1	35	21	269	2	0	10	66	0
