= Matt Leo =

Australian player of American football (born 1992)

Philadelphia Eagles
- Title: Player development assistant

Personal information
- Born: 8 May 1992 (age 34); Adelaide, South Australia
- Listed height: 6 ft 7 in (2.01 m)
- Listed weight: 280 lb (127 kg)

Career information
- High school: St Michael's College (Adelaide)
- College: Iowa State
- NFL draft: 2020: undrafted
- CFL draft: 2021G: 4th round, 35th overall pick

Career history

Playing
- Philadelphia Eagles (2020–2022)*
- * Offseason or practice squad member only

Coaching
- Philadelphia Eagles (2023) Defensive / football operations assistant; Philadelphia Eagles (2024–present) Player development assistant
- Stats at Pro Football Reference

Matthew Leo (born 8 May 1992) is an Australian former American football defensive end and coach who is a player development assistant for the Philadelphia Eagles of the National Football League (NFL). He played college football for the Iowa State Cyclones and spent three seasons with the Eagles as a player, joining them through the International Player Pathway Program (IPPP).

== Early life and education ==
Matthew Leo was born on 8 May 1992 in Adelaide, South Australia, and raised in the suburb of Semaphore. He played Australian rules football for St Michael's College, Adelaide, in year 10. However his passion was rugby league and he played for a club in Adelaide. Matt is of Rotuman descent from his paternal side.

He worked as a plumber before playing American football professionally. He went to college at Arizona Western College before going to Iowa State, making his debut at the age of 26. He was a medical redshirt in 2017. He had 33 tackles and 3 sacks in his college football career. He was named first-team Academic All-Big 12 in 2019.

== Professional career ==
On 27 April 2020, Leo was allocated to the Philadelphia Eagles as part of the International Player Pathway Program. He was waived during final roster cuts on 4 September 2020, and signed to the practice squad under an international player exemption two days later. He signed a reserve/future contract with the team after the season on 4 January 2021.

Leo was selected by the Edmonton Elks in the fourth round (35th overall) of the 2021 CFL global draft in April 2021. On 4 May 2021, he was given an NFL roster exemption as an international player for a second season.

On 31 August 2021, Leo was waived by the Eagles and re-signed to the practice squad the next day. He signed a reserve/future contract with the Eagles on 18 January 2022.

On 30 August 2022, Leo was waived by the Eagles and signed to the practice squad the next day. On 15 February 2023, Leo signed a reserve/future contract with the Eagles.

== Post-playing career ==
On 25 July 2023, Leo announced his retirement from the NFL. Soon after, he was hired as a defensive and football operations assistant on the coaching staff. On 9 June 2024, Leo was promoted to the role of player development assistant.
