= GTA Grizzlies =

Junior Canadian football team

Logo

General information
- Founded: 2014
- Stadium: Jean Augustine Stadium
- Headquartered: Brampton, Ontario
- Colours: Navy blue, light blue and white
- Website: www.gtagrizzliesfootball.com

Personnel
- Head coach: Mike Leonard

League / conference affiliations
- Canadian Junior Football League; Ontario Football Conference

The GTA Grizzlies are a Canadian Junior Football League (CJFL) team located in Etobicoke in Toronto, Ontario and representing the Greater Toronto Area (GTA). They play in the Ontario Football Conference (OFC) which is part of the CJFL and compete annually for the national title known as the Canadian Bowl. According to the Ontario Football Conference website, the Grizzlies have gone 0-8 in five consecutive seasons. They finished the 2025 season winless, with a point differential of -392.

== History ==
The Grizzlies were originally founded in 2014 by a group that included general manager, Mark Houlder, and team president, Karen Escoffery. The team replaced the former Brampton Bears CJFL franchise, where Houlder was the head coach from 2010 to 2011, which operated from 2010 to 2013. While the two franchises are not related, many of the rights of former Bears players were transferred to the Grizzlies upon the team's creation. The team first began playing home games at Henry Carr Secondary School before moving to Centennial Park Stadium in 2015.

After Houlder was elected as the First Vice President of the Ontario Football Conference to the CJFL Executive Board, Mike Leonard returned as the team's head coach, having previously held the title in 2018.
