= Jake Ford (gridiron football) =

Australian gridiron football player (born 1993)

No. 17
- Position: Punter

Personal information
- Born: January 22, 1993 (age 33); Australia
- Listed height: 6 ft 1 in (1.85 m)
- Listed weight: 224 lb (102 kg)

Career information
- College: Oregon (2015); St. Augustine's (2017); Ouachita Baptist (2018–2019)
- CFL draft: 2021G: 1st round, 1st overall pick

Career history
- 2021: BC Lions

Awards and highlights
- Division II net punting leader (2018)

Career CFL statistics
- Punts: 11
- Punting yards: 472
- Punting average: 42.9
- Longest punt: 58
- Inside 20: 1
- Stats at CFL.ca

Jake Ford (born January 22, 1993) is an Australian former professional gridiron football punter who played for the BC Lions of the Canadian Football League (CFL). He was selected by the Lions with the first overall pick in the inaugural CFL global draft in 2021. He played college football at Oregon, St. Augustine's, and Ouachita Baptist.

== Early life ==
Ford was born in Australia. He played rugby and Australian rules football before receiving an invite from Prokick Australia, a camp aimed at transitioning Australians into playing positions at U.S. colleges and in the NFL. He was a sport science assistant for AFL Victoria from 2013 to 2015.

== College career ==
Ford moved to the United States, and joined the Oregon Ducks in 2015. However, he did not play in any games for the Ducks.

He later played in ten games for the St. Augustine's Falcons in 2017, punting 52 times for 2,052 yards and a 39.5 average. He also kicked off 51 times for 2,892 yards and a 56.7 average.

Ford transferred to play for the Ouachita Baptist Tigers from 2018 to 2019. He appeared in 12 games in 2018, recording 51 punts for 2,065 yards and a 40.5 average. He led NCAA Division II in net punting (punting yards minus return yards) that season. Ford played in 12 games during the 2019 season, punting 29 times for 1,136 yards and a 39.2 average while also kicking off 63 times for 3,824 yards and a 60.7 average.

== Professional career ==
After going undrafted in the 2020 NFL draft, Ford played for the Alphas of The Spring League in 2020.

He was selected by the BC Lions of the Canadian Football League (CFL) with the first overall pick in the inaugural CFL global draft in 2021. He signed with the team on May 5, 2021. Ford dressed in two games for the Lions in 2021 and spent part of the season on the practice roster. Overall, he punted 11 times for 472 yards (358 net yards) and a 42.9 average. He also made one special teams tackle. Ford was released by the Lions on November 20, 2021.

== Coaching career ==
Ford was an assistant coach for the Ouachita Baptist Tigers football team in 2022.
