= Takeru Yamasaki =

Japanese gridiron football player (born 1993)

No. 71
- Position: Placekicker

Personal information
- Born: September 2, 1993 (age 33); Japan
- Listed height: 5 ft 7 in (1.70 m)
- Listed weight: 183 lb (83 kg)

Career information
- College: Osaka
- CFL draft: 2021G: 3rd round, 19th overall pick

Career history
- X-League (2017–2018); The Spring League (2019); Obic Seagulls (2020); BC Lions (2021)

Career CFL statistics
- Games played: 2
- Field goal attempts: 8
- Field goals made: 4
- Stats at CFL.ca

Takeru Yamasaki (born September 2, 1993) is a Japanese former professional Canadian football placekicker. He played college football in Japan for Osaka University and spent three seasons in the X-League before being signed by the BC Lions in the Canadian Football League (CFL) in 2021. He appeared in their first two games of the 2021 season before being released. He kicked four field goals with the Lions, becoming the first Japanese player to ever score in the CFL.

== Early life and education ==
Yamasaki was born in 1993 in Japan and played college football for Osaka University there. He originally was a running back and wide receiver, before later transitioning to placekicker. Teammates nicknamed him the "Japanese Kicking Monster."

== Professional career ==
After college Yamasaki spent two seasons in Japan's top amateur football league, the X-League. In 2019, he played one season in The Spring League. He returned to Japan the following year, playing again in the X-League. He won the 2020 league championship as a member of the Obic Seagulls.

In 2021, he was drafted in the third round (19th overall) of the 2021 CFL global draft by the BC Lions. He signed a contract with them on May 6. He beat out the team's other placekickers and made the final roster. He made his debut in week one, against the Saskatchewan Roughriders. He kicked a 43-yard field goal as the first half expired, becoming the first Japanese player to score points in a CFL game. He finished the game 2-for-4 on field goals. Against the Calgary Stampeders the following week, Yamasaki went 2-for-4 again, but his missed field goals led to his release a few days later.
