= Jordan Maksymic =

Canadian gridiron football coach

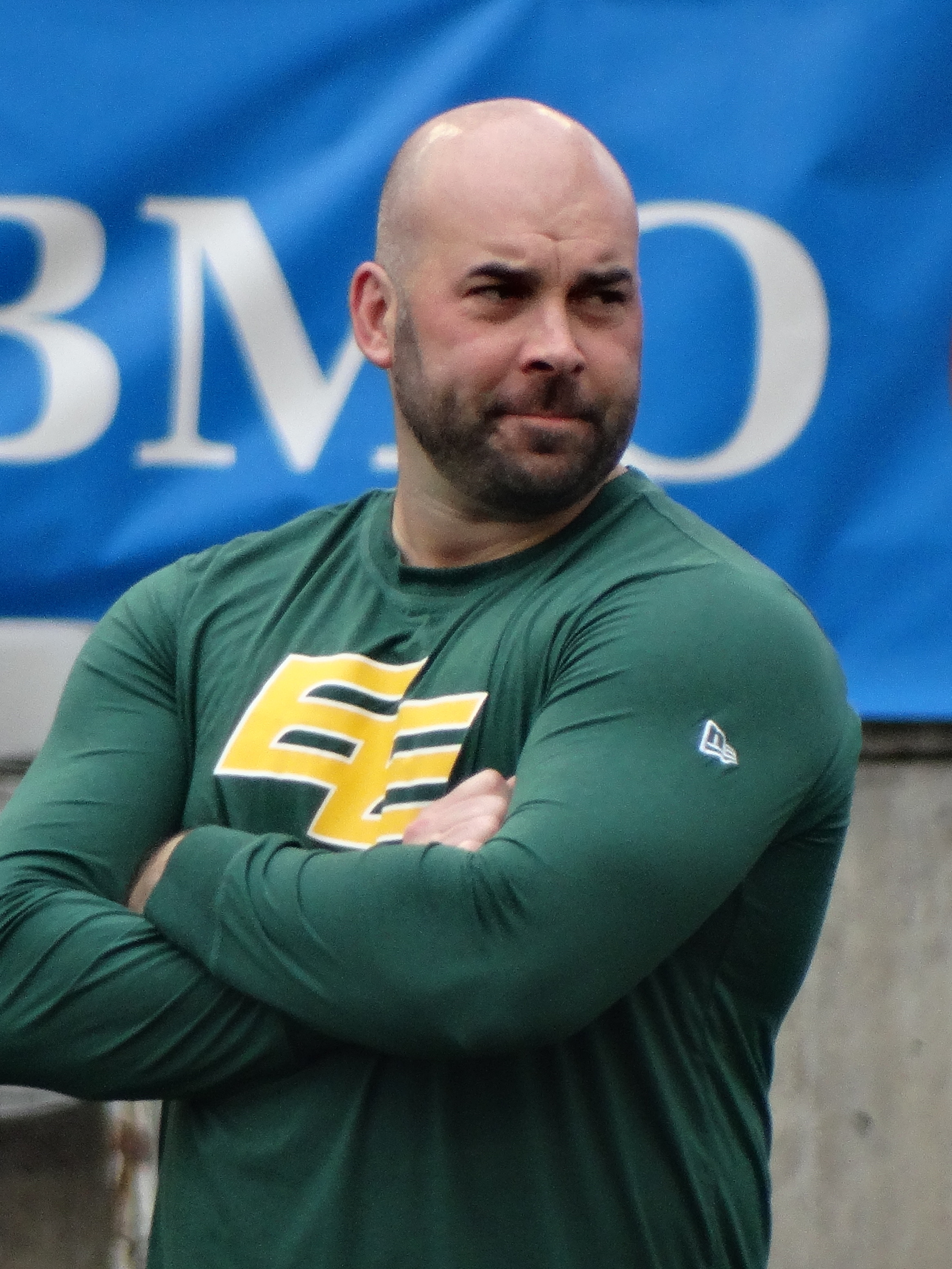
- Maksymic with the Edmonton Elks in 2025

Edmonton Elks
- Title: Offensive coordinator Assistant head coach

Personal information
- Born: 1987 (age 38–39); St. Albert, Alberta

Career information
- College: Northern Arizona

Career history
- 2009–2010: Northern Arizona Lumberjacks (Graduate assistant)
- 2013: Edmonton Eskimos (Offensive assistant)
- 2014: Ottawa Redblacks (Offensive assistant)
- 2015: Ottawa Redblacks (Running backs coach)
- 2016–2019: Edmonton Eskimos (Quarterbacks coach)
- 2018: Edmonton Eskimos (Pass game coordinator)
- 2019: Edmonton Eskimos (Offensive coordinator)
- 2020–2024: BC Lions (Offensive coordinator)
- 2025–present: Edmonton Elks (Offensive coordinator) (Assistant head coach)

Awards and highlights
- Grey Cup champion (2026)

Jordan Maksymic is a Canadian professional football coach who is the offensive coordinator and assistant head coach for the Edmonton Elks of the Canadian Football League (CFL).

== Early life ==
Maksymic grew up in St. Albert, Alberta, where he played at quarterback for his high school team, the Bellerose Bulldogs. Upon graduation, he joined the team as an assistant coach for 2005 and 2006. His neighbour, Tom Higgins, had introduced him to football while he was he head coach and general manager of the Edmonton Eskimos and invited him to work as a water boy in 2006 for the Calgary Stampeders while Higgins was the head coach for the team. He then worked as a video coordinator for the Stampeders in 2007 and 2008.

== Coaching career ==
=== Northern Arizona ===
Maksymic worked as a graduate assistant for the Northern Arizona Lumberjacks in 2009 and 2010 while he went to school at Northern Arizona University.

=== Edmonton Eskimos ===
Maksymic was hired as the video coordinator for the Edmonton Eskimos in 2011 and also served in that role in 2012. He was added to the coaching staff as an offensive assistant in 2013.

=== Ottawa Redblacks ===
Maksymic was hired by the expansion Ottawa Redblacks in 2014 to serve as an offensive assistant on the coaching staff. He was promoted to running backs coach for the 2015 season where the team made an appearance in the 103rd Grey Cup.

=== Edmonton Eskimos (II) ===
In 2016, it was announced that Maksymic had re-joined the Edmonton Eskimos to be part of Jason Maas' staff as the team's quarterbacks coach. In 2018, he added the title of pass game coordinator in addition to his quarterback coaching duties. He was further promoted to offensive coordinator and quarterbacks coach for the 2019 season, although Maas continued to call the plays.

=== BC Lions ===
Following a coaching change in Edmonton, Maksymic joined the BC Lions in January 2020 as the team's offensive coordinator, reuniting him with former Redblacks head coach, Rick Campbell. In his first season calling plays, quarterback Michael Reilly led the league in passing and the Lions had two receivers, Bryan Burnham and Lucky Whitehead, named as CFL All-Stars.

=== Edmonton Elks (III) ===
On January 10, 2025, it was announced that Maksymic had been hired as the offensive coordinator and assistant head coach for the Edmonton Elks.
