= London Beefeaters =

Canadian Football team in Ontario, Canada

Logo

General information
- Founded: 1975
- Stadium: CityWide Sports Park (2020-Present); TD Stadium (2001–2019); JW Little Memorial Stadium (1975–1990) John Paul 2 1990-1995
- Headquartered: London, Ontario, Canada
- Colours: Navy, red
- Website: www.londonbeefeaters.ca

Personnel
- Head coach: Scott Wilkinson (2026-)
- President: Robert Annen (2016-present)

Nickname
- Beefs

League / conference affiliations
- Canadian Junior Football League; Ontario Football Conference

Championships
- Conference championships: 0; 3 (2012, 2019, 2021)

The London Beefeaters are a Canadian Junior Football League (CJFL) team located in London, Ontario. They play in the Ontario Football Conference (OFC) which is part of the CJFL, and compete annually for the national title known as the Canadian Bowl.

The team was founded in 1975 and earned their first championship in the OFC defeating the Hamilton Hurricanes 19–16 in 2012. On October 28, 2012, they advanced to the CJFL semi finals against the Saskatoon Hilltops at Gordie Howe Bowl in Saskatoon where they were defeated 51–7. On October 27, 2019, the Beefeaters earned their second OFC title defeating the Windsor Fratmen 28–20 at Alumni Field.

On Nov 20, 2021, the Beefeaters, in a stunning comeback, successfully defended their OFC title against the St Clair Fratmen. Two St. Clair miscues turned the tide in the dying minutes as the London Beefeaters rallied for a second-straight title by hitting a rouge as time expired to take the game 15–14.

On December 4, 2021, the Beefeaters made franchise history by hosting and playing in their first Canadian Bowl against the Langley Rams.

== Notable players ==
- Shaq Johnson was drafted by the BC Lions in the 4th round of the 2016 CFL draft
- Hakeem Johnson selected by the BC Lions in the 4th round (33rd overall) of the 2019 CFL draft
- Josh Woodman was drafted by the Edmonton Eskimos in the 5th round (44th overall) in the 2016 CFL draft
- Zack Medeiros was drafted 48th overall by the Edmonton Eskimos in the 2014 CFL draft. He won his first Grey Cup Championship while playing for the Ottawa Redblacks in the 104th Grey Cup Game. He most recently played for the Toronto Argonauts.
- Tanner Cadwallader was selected in the 7th round (64th overall) by the Winnipeg Blue Bombers in the 2020 CFL draft

== Gallery ==
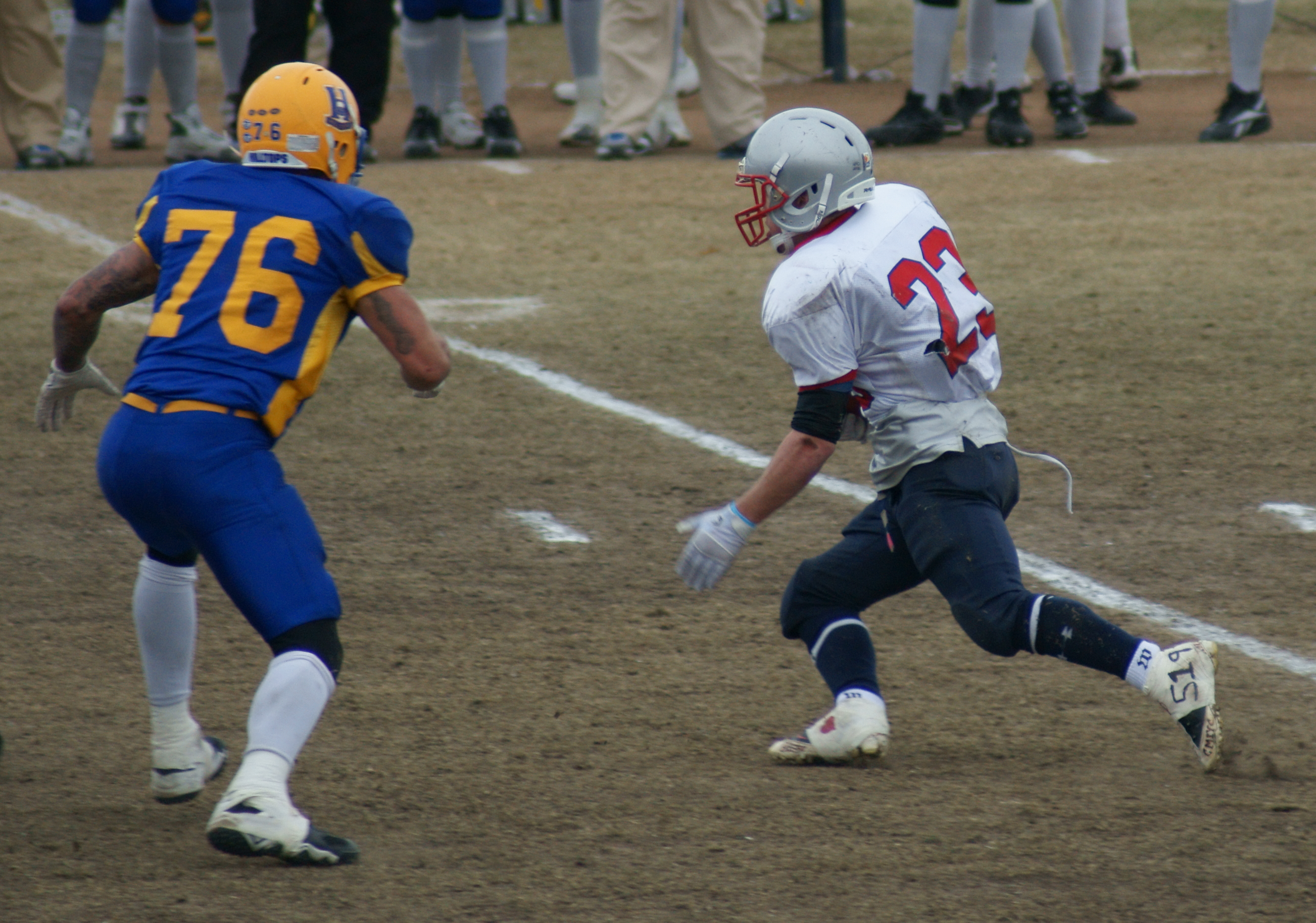
Beefeater 23 Kyle Woldenberg-Puyda meeting Hilltops 76 Brett Pisio at the CJFL semi final

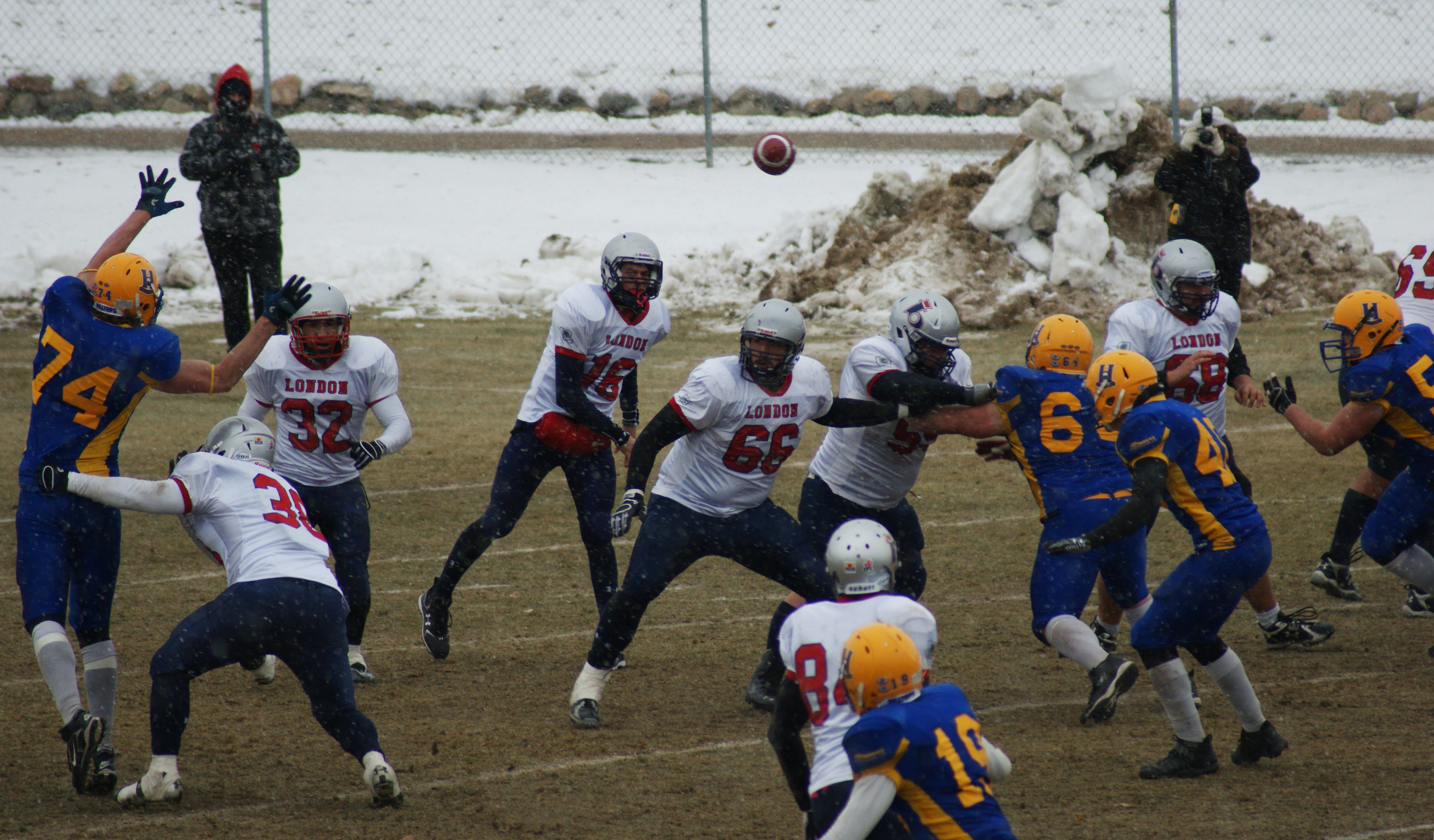
Beefeaters 32 Joel Clubine ball carrier
