= Tibo Debaillie =

Belgian gridiron football player (born 1997)

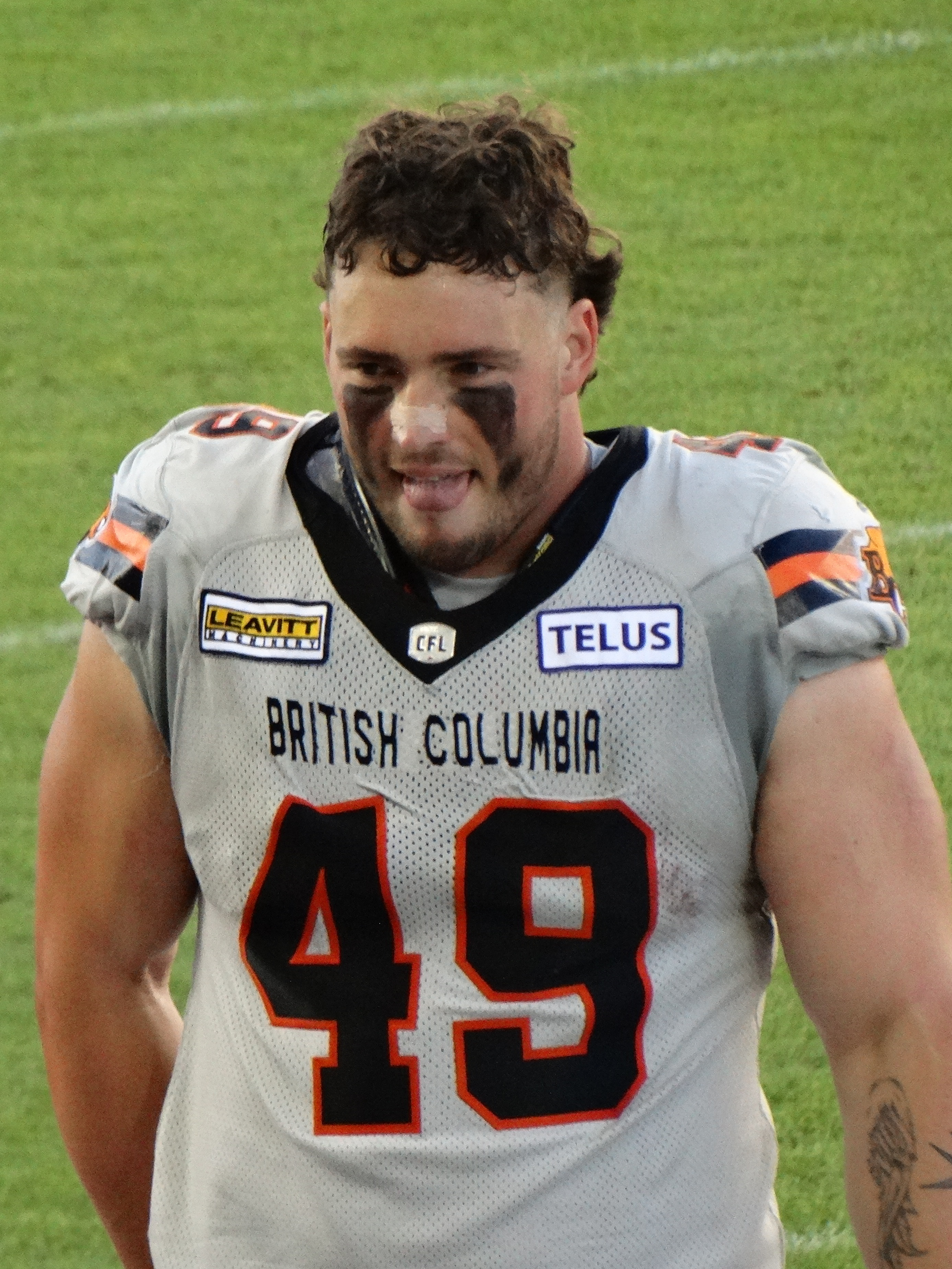
- Debaillie with the BC Lions in 2024

No. 40 – BC Lions
- Position: Defensive lineman
- Roster status: Active
- CFL status: Global

Personal information
- Born: 10 September 1997 (age 29); Gistel, Belgium
- Listed height: 6 ft 3 in (1.91 m)
- Listed weight: 280 lb (127 kg)

Career information
- College: Towson
- CFL draft: 2021G: 3rd round, 20th overall pick

Career history
- 2010/11–2016: Ostend Pirates
- 2021: Edmonton Elks
- 2022–present: BC Lions

Awards and highlights
- Belgian Bowl (XXIX)

Career CFL statistics as of 2026
- Games played: 80
- Tackles: 62
- Sacks: 8
- Stats at CFL.ca

Tibo Debaillie (born 10 September 1997) is a Belgian professional gridiron football defensive lineman for the BC Lions of the Canadian Football League (CFL). He played college football at Towson.

== Early life ==
Debaillie was born in Gistel, Belgium on 10 September 1997. His father, Yvan, played American football in the 1980s, as did three of his uncles. Tibo gave up association football and dreamed of playing college football in the United States. When he was 13 he joined the Ostend Pirates of the Belgian Football League, a league of players already in their 20s, because there was nobody in his age category. Over the next few years he earned two player of the year awards and helped his team win the Belgian Bowl XXIX. He also earned four caps with the Belgium national American football team, including a game against Poland two days after his 16th birthday.

In 2016, Debaillie was discovered by Europe’s Elite, an organization co-founded by former pro player Brandon Collier that connects talented European prospects with American college coaches. He took a trip to America that summer, visiting Penn State, Maryland, Towson, Albany and UMass as Europe's Elite's first ever representative. Debaillie later took an official visit to Towson with his family in early September, committing to the school in Towson, Maryland shortly afterwards.

== College career ==
Debaillie played college football for the Towson Tigers from 2017 to 2019, logging 29 tackles, three tackles for loss and 1.5 sacks over 22 career games. He cited the tempo of the game as the biggest adjustment he had to make to play in America.

Debaillie played in all 11 games as a freshman, notably recording a sack against in-state rivals Maryland, but only appeared in two games as a sophomore due to injury. In 2019, he started nine games on the defensive line, recording a career-high nine tackles against The Citadel as well as an assisted sack of Kyle Trask against #9 Florida. The 2020 season was cancelled due to the COVID-19 pandemic; head coach Rob Ambrose lamented Debaillie's lost year, saying "This is his killer year, the one he’s supposed to get to talk about for the rest of his life and one that we get to brag about for the rest of his life." He was able to secure a flight to Belgium before the country went on lockdown, and had to finish his classes online while staying conditioned.

== Professional career ==
=== Edmonton Elks ===
After recording 31 bench press reps at the CFL Global Combine, Debaillie was drafted by the Edmonton Elks with the 20th overall pick in the 2021 CFL global draft. He signed with the team two weeks later, and officially made the roster in August after final cuts. Debaillie appeared in the first two games of the season in a special teams role before being relegated to the practice squad. He was elevated to the active roster again for their week 13 loss to the Hamilton Tiger-Cats, where he recorded his first career defensive tackle, before being reverted back to the practice squad.

He re-signed with the Elks on December 15, 2021. However, he was released later in the off season on February 28, 2022.

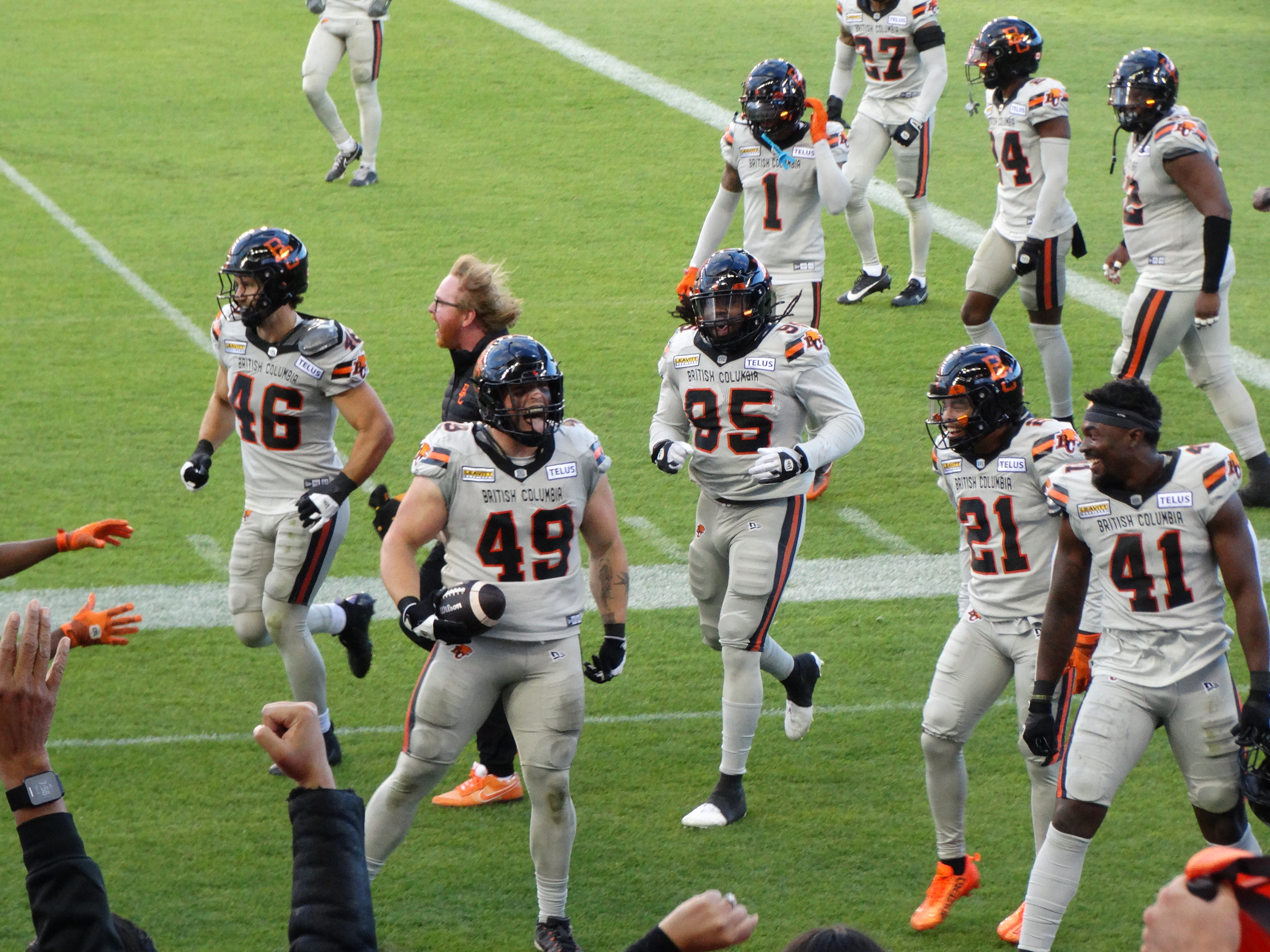
Debaillie (#49) celebrates his first career touchdown in 2024.

=== BC Lions ===
On May 3, 2022, Debaillie signed with the BC Lions. He played in all 18 regular season games in 2022 where he had a career-high 20 defensive tackles, three sacks, and one fumble recovery. In 2023, he played in 18 regular season games, starting in two, and recorded 14 defensive tackles and one sack. As a pending free agent, Debaillie re-signed with the Lions on January 30, 2024, to a one-year contract extension.

In the 2024 season opener, on June 9, 2024, against the Toronto Argonauts, Debaillie scored his first career touchdown when he recovered a fumble by Cameron Dukes and returned the ball 20 yards for the score. He became the first global player in CFL history to have scored a touchdown.

On January 9, 2025, Debaillie signed a two-year contract extension with BC.

On July 13, 2025, Debaillie was placed one the Lions' 1-game injured list after suffering an injury during the previous week's game against the Montreal Alouettes. He rejoined the active roster on September 11, 2025. On September 18, 2025, Debaillie was placed on the Lions' 6-game injured list. He rejoined the active roster on October 3, 2025.
