= 2021 CFL global draft =

Canadian football draft

General information
- Sport: Canadian football
- Date: April 15, 2021
- Time: 1:00 pm EDT
- Location: Toronto

Overview
- 36 total selections in 4 rounds
- League: CFL
- First selection: Jake Ford, P, BC Lions
- U Sports selections: 0
- NCAA selections: 24

The 2021 CFL global draft took place on April 15, 2021 and was the first CFL draft that pooled all of the global players together after previously having separate drafts for Mexican players and European players in 2019. 36 players were chosen from among eligible players following a virtual CFL Combine. The order of the draft was determined by random lottery, similar to the system used for the 2021 CFL draft. As a snake draft, each odd round was in the opposite order of each even round.

== Background ==
The Canadian Football League introduced global players for the 2019 CFL season through the LFA and European drafts where each team was required to have one of these players on the active roster and up to two on the practice roster. The league had planned to have one single draft for global players in 2020 just before the start of the season, but with the 2020 CFL season cancelled, so was this draft. The 2020 draft was planned to have five rounds

For the 2021 CFL season, teams were required to keep two global players on the active roster and up to three on the practice roster. Global players are required to sign their first contracts for a length of two years plus a one-year club option.

== Trades ==
In the explanations below, (D) denotes trades that took place during the draft, while (PD) indicates trades completed pre-draft.

=== Round three ===
- Toronto → Calgary (PD). Toronto traded this selection and a fifth-round pick in the 2021 CFL draft to Calgary in exchange for a sixth-round pick in the 2021 CFL draft, a fourth-round pick in the 2021 global draft, and the rights to Eric Rogers, Cordarro Law, and Robertson Daniel.

=== Round four ===
- Calgary → Toronto (PD). Calgary traded this selection, a sixth-round pick in the 2021 CFL draft, and the rights to Eric Rogers, Cordarro Law, and Robertson Daniel to Toronto in exchange for a fifth-round pick in the 2021 CFL draft and a third-round pick in the 2021 global draft.

== Draft order ==
=== Round one ===
Pick #	CFL team	Player	Position	University/club team	Nationality
1	BC Lions	Jake Ford	P	Ouachita Baptist	Australia
2	Edmonton Football Team	Steven Nielsen	OL	Eastern Michigan	Denmark
3	Toronto Argonauts	Tigie Sankoh	DB	Kent Exiles	(United Kingdom) Great Britain
4	Winnipeg Blue Bombers	Les Maruo	LB	UTSA	Japan
5	Saskatchewan Roughriders	Christopher Ezeala	RB	Ingolstadt Dukes	Germany
6	Montreal Alouettes	Joseph Zema	P	Incarnate Word	Australia
7	Calgary Stampeders	Cody Grace	P	Arkansas State	Australia
8	Hamilton Tiger-Cats	Joel Whitford	P	Washington	Australia
9	Ottawa Redblacks	Anthony Mahoungou	REC	Purdue	France

=== Round two ===
Pick #	CFL team	Player	Position	University/club team	Nationality
10	Ottawa Redblacks	Tyron Vrede	LB	North Dakota	Netherlands
11	Hamilton Tiger-Cats	Chris Mulumba	DL	Colorado	Finland
12	Calgary Stampeders	Franklin Agbasimere	DL	Missouri	Nigeria
13	Montreal Alouettes	Akio Yamagishi	LB	Fujitsu Frontiers	Japan
14	Saskatchewan Roughriders	Kaare Vedvik	P	Marshall	Norway
15	Winnipeg Blue Bombers	Tomoya Machino	OL	Fujitsu Frontiers	Japan
16	Toronto Argonauts	Toshiki Sato	K	IBM Big Blue	Japan
17	Edmonton Football Team	Misiona Aiolupotea-Pei	DL	Washington State	New Zealand
18	BC Lions	Bo Qiao Li	DL	Charleston	China

=== Round three ===
Pick #	CFL team	Player	Position	University/club team	Nationality
19	BC Lions	Takeru Yamasaki	K	Obic Seagulls	Japan
20	Edmonton Football Team	Tibo Debaillie	DL	Towson	Belgium
21	Calgary Stampeders (via Toronto)	Aaron Donkor	LB	Arkansas State	Germany
22	Winnipeg Blue Bombers	Ayo Oyelola	LB	Nottingham	(United Kingdom) Great Britain
23	Saskatchewan Roughriders	Jon Henry Nell	K	N/A (Baltimore Brigade)	South Africa
24	Montreal Alouettes	Taku Lee	RB	Obic Seagulls	Japan
25	Calgary Stampeders	Isaac Alarcón	OL	Monterrey IT	Mexico
26	Hamilton Tiger-Cats	David Izinyon	LB	Rostock Griffins	(United Kingdom) Great Britain
27	Ottawa Redblacks	Chris Ferguson	OL	Cincinnati	The Bahamas

=== Round four ===
Pick #	CFL team	Player	Position	University/club team	Nationality
28	Ottawa Redblacks	Tony Anderson	DB	Grand View	France
29	Hamilton Tiger-Cats	Dominik Eberle	K	Utah State	Germany
30	Toronto Argonauts (via Calgary)	Max Duffy	P	Kentucky	Australia
31	Montreal Alouettes	William James	DB	North Dakota	Sweden
32	Saskatchewan Roughriders	Sebastien Sagne	REC	Frankfurt Universe	Finland
33	Winnipeg Blue Bombers	Arryn Siposs	P	Auburn	Australia
34	Toronto Argonauts	Sammis Reyes	REC	Tulane	Chile
35	Edmonton Football Team	Matt Leo	DE	Iowa State	Australia
36	BC Lions	Niklas Gustav	DL	Morningside	Germany

== See also ==
- 2021 CFL draft
