= 2016 Winnipeg Blue Bombers season =

Canadian football team season

- General manager: Kyle Walters
- Head coach: Mike O'Shea
- Home stadium: Investors Group Field

Results
- Record: 11–7
- Division place: 3rd, West
- Playoffs: Lost West Semi-Final
- Team MOP: Matt Nichols
- Team MOC: Andrew Harris
- Team MOR: Taylor Loffler

Uniform
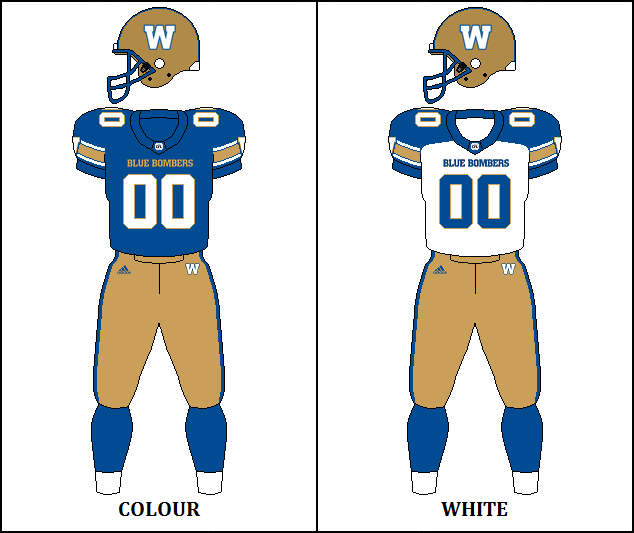

The 2016 Winnipeg Blue Bombers season was the 59th season for the team in the Canadian Football League and their 84th season overall. The Blue Bombers finished in third place in the West Division and finished with an 11–7 record; their first winning season since 2011.

The Blue Bombers successfully improved upon their 5–13 record from 2015, after defeating the Saskatchewan Roughriders in the Labour Day Classic on September 4. It was their first win in the Classic since 2004.

The Blue Bombers qualified for the playoffs for the first time since 2011 with a week 16 victory over the BC Lions followed by losses by the Toronto Argonauts and Montreal Alouettes two days afterward. In the Playoffs the Blue Bombers ended up losing 32–31, ending their season.

== Offseason ==
=== CFL draft ===
The 2016 CFL draft took place on May 10, 2016. The Blue Bombers had eight selections in the eight-round draft. The team forfeited the second overall selection after selecting Garrett Waggoner in the 2015 Supplemental Draft. However, the Blue Bombers were able to get back into the top nine when they acquired the ninth overall selection after trading Chris Greaves to the Edmonton Eskimos.

Round	Pick	Player	Position	School/club team
2	9	Trent Corney	DL	Virginia
2	10	Michael Couture	OL	Simon Fraser
3	19	Taylor Loffler	DB	British Columbia
4	28	Shayne Gauthier	LB	Laval
5	37	Zachary Intzandt	OL	McMaster
6	46	Rupert Butcher	DL	Western Ontario
7	55	Alex Vitt	SB	Manitoba
8	63	Frank Renaud	LB	Windsor

== Preseason ==
Week	Date	Kickoff	Opponent	Results		TV	Venue	Attendance	Summary
Week	Date	Kickoff	Opponent	Score	Record	TV	Venue	Attendance	Summary
A	Wed, June 8	7:00 p.m. CDT	vs. Montreal Alouettes	W 36–13	1–0	TSN/RDS	Investors Group Field	23,334	Recap
A	Mon, June 13	6:00 p.m. CDT	at Ottawa Redblacks	L 14–18	1–1	TSN	TD Place Stadium	17,947	Recap
B	Bye								

== Regular season ==
=== Standings ===
West Division
Team	GP	W	L	T	Pts	PF	PA	Div	Stk	
Calgary Stampeders	18	15	2	1	31	586	369	9–1	L1	Details
BC Lions	18	12	6	0	24	545	454	5–5	W3	Details
Winnipeg Blue Bombers	18	11	7	0	22	497	454	5–5	W1	Details
Edmonton Eskimos	18	10	8	0	20	549	496	5–5	W2	Details
Saskatchewan Roughriders	18	5	13	0	10	350	530	1–9	L3	Details

=== Schedule ===
Week	Date	Kickoff	Opponent	Results		TV	Venue	Attendance	Summary
Week	Date	Kickoff	Opponent	Score	Record	TV	Venue	Attendance	Summary
1	Fri, June 24	7:30 p.m. CDT	vs. Montreal Alouettes	L 14–22	0–1	TSN/RDS/ESPN2	Investors Group Field	26,433	Recap
2	Fri, July 1	9:00 p.m. CDT	at Calgary Stampeders	L 22–36	0–2	TSN/ESPN2	McMahon Stadium	26,815	Recap
3	Thurs, July 7	6:00 p.m. CDT	at Hamilton Tiger-Cats	W 28–24	1–2	TSN/ESPN2	Tim Hortons Field	23,846	Recap
4	Thurs, July 14	7:30 p.m. CDT	vs. Edmonton Eskimos	L 16–20	1–3	TSN/RDS	Investors Group Field	24,007	Recap
5	Thurs, July 21	6:00 p.m. CDT	vs. Calgary Stampeders	L 18–33	1–4	TSN	Investors Group Field	24,677	Recap
6	Thurs, July 28	7:30 p.m. CDT	at Edmonton Eskimos	W 30–23	2–4	TSN/RDS2/ESPN2	Commonwealth Stadium	25,902	Recap
7	Wed, Aug 3	7:30 p.m. CDT	vs. Hamilton Tiger-Cats	W 37–11	3–4	TSN	Investors Group Field	24,041	Recap
8	Fri, Aug 12	6:30 p.m. CDT	at Toronto Argonauts	W 34–17	4–4	TSN	BMO Field	15,063	Recap
9	Bye								
10	Fri, Aug 26	6:00 p.m. CDT	at Montreal Alouettes	W 32–18	5–4	TSN/RDS	Molson Stadium	19,026	Recap
11	Sun, Sept 4	2:00 p.m. CDT	at Saskatchewan Roughriders	W 28–25	6–4	TSN	Mosaic Stadium	33,427	Recap
12	Sat, Sept 10	3:00 p.m. CDT	vs. Saskatchewan Roughriders	W 17–10	7–4	TSN	Investors Group Field	33,234	Recap
13	Sat, Sept 17	1:00 p.m. CDT	vs. Toronto Argonauts	W 46–29	8–4	TSN	Investors Group Field	25,943	Recap
14	Sat, Sept 24	3:00 p.m. CDT	at Calgary Stampeders	L 34–36	8–5	TSN/RDS2	McMahon Stadium	27,159	Recap
15	Fri, Sept 30	7:30 p.m. CDT	vs. Edmonton Eskimos	L 26–40	8–6	TSN/RDS2	Investors Group Field	24,706	Recap
16	Sat, Oct 8	3:00 p.m. CDT	vs. BC Lions	W 37–35	9–6	TSN	Investors Group Field	24,284	Recap
17	Fri, Oct 14	9:00 p.m. CDT	at BC Lions	W 35–32	10–6	TSN	BC Place	19,520	Recap
18	Bye								
19	Sat, Oct 29	3:00 p.m. CDT	vs. Ottawa Redblacks	L 10–23	10–7	TSN/RDS2	Investors Group Field	26,097	Recap
20	Fri, Nov 4	6:00 p.m. CDT	at Ottawa Redblacks	W 33–20	11–7	TSN/RDS2	TD Place Stadium	24,432	Recap

== Post-season ==
=== Schedule ===
Game	Date	Kickoff	Opponent	Results		TV	Venue	Attendance	Summary
Game	Date	Kickoff	Opponent	Score	Record	TV	Venue	Attendance	Summary
West Semi-Final	Sun, Nov 13	3:30 p.m. CST	at BC Lions	L 31–32	0–1	TSN/RDS/ESPN3	BC Place	19,176	Recap

== Roster ==
2016 Winnipeg Blue Bombers final roster
Quarterbacks: 6 Dominique Davis; 5 Kevin Glenn; 15 Matt Nichols; Running backs: 33 Andrew Harris; 37 Christophe Normand; 41 James Tuck; Receivers: 4 Darvin Adams; 89 Clarence Denmark; 7 Weston Dressler; 83 Julian Feoli-Gudino; 87 Rory Kohlert; 14 Quincy McDuffie; 86 Addison Richards; 12 Ryan Smith	Offensive linemen: 60 Travis Bond G; 66 Stanley Bryant T; 69 Sukh Chungh G; 59 Michael Couture C; 61 Matthias Goossen C; 51 Jermarcus Hardrick T/G; 53 Patrick Neufeld T/G; Defensive linemen: 93 Justin Cole DE; 43 Trent Corney DE; 94 Euclid Cummings DT; 99 Padric Scott DT; 74 Keith Shologan DT; 95 Jake Thomas DT; 55 Jamaal Westerman DE	Linebackers: 2 Khalil Bass; 34 Jesse Briggs; 26 Tony Burnett; 44 Shayne Gauthier; 10 Sam Hurl; 50 Kyle Knox; 22 Garrett Waggoner; 38 Ian Wild; Defensive backs: 35 Terrence Frederick; 13 T. J. Heath; 25 Bruce Johnson; 0 Derek Jones; 31 Maurice Leggett; 16 Taylor Loffler; 8 Chris Randle; 27 Teague Sherman	Special teams: 9 Justin Medlock K/P; 46 Chad Rempel LS; Practice roster: 18 Bryan Bennett QB; 42 Chris Greenwood DB; 19 Thomas Mayo SB; 29 Julian Posey DB; 91 Brandon Tennant DT; 36 Justin Warden DB; Injured list: 32 Tim Flanders RB; 23 Kevin Fogg DB; 57 Manase Foketi T; 49 Shayon Green DE; 81 Tori Gurley WR; 3 Macho Harris DB; 67 Jeff Keeping C; 24 Pascal Lochard RB; 21 Brendan Morgan DB; 17 C. J. Roberts DB; 88 Gerrard Sheppard SB; Italics indicate International players

== Coaching staff ==
Winnipeg Blue Bombers Staff
Front office: Owner – Community owned (non-profit corporation owned by members); Chairperson of the board of governors – Brock Bulbuck; President/CEO – Wade Miller; General manager of football operations – Kyle Walters; Assistant General Manager / Director of U.S. Scouting – Danny McManus; Assistant general manager / director of player personnel – Ted Goveia; National Scout –Craig Smith; Director of Football Operations - Dave Siddall; Head equipment manager – Brad Fotty; Assistant equipment manager – Kevin Todd; Assistant equipment manager – Jared Cronk; Video coordinator – Kent Anderson; Assistant video coordinator – Colin Thurston; Head coaches: Head coach – Mike O'Shea; Offensive coaches: Offensive coordinator – Paul LaPolice; Quarterbacks – Buck Pierce; Wide receivers – Paul LaPolice; Running backs – Avon Cobourne; Offensive line – Bob Wylie; Assistant Offensive Line - Marty Costello	Defensive coaches: Defensive coordinator – Richie Hall; Linebackers – Glen Young; Defensive line – Todd Howard; Defensive backs – Tony Missick; Special teams coaches: Special teams coordinator – Mike O'Shea; Special teams assistant – Paul Boudreau; → Coaching staff
