= 2017 Winnipeg Blue Bombers season =

Canadian football team season

- General manager: Kyle Walters
- Head coach: Mike O'Shea
- Home stadium: Investors Group Field

Results
- Record: 12–6
- Division place: 2nd, West
- Playoffs: Lost West Semi-Final
- Team MOP: Matt Nichols
- Team MOC: Andrew Harris
- Team MOR: Brandon Alexander

Uniform
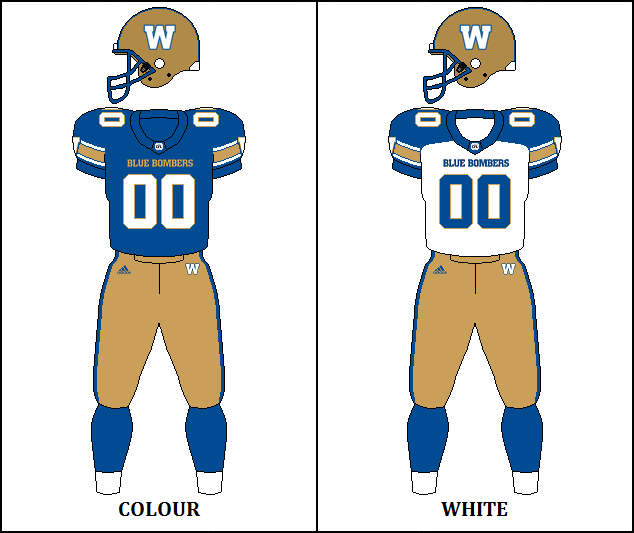

The 2017 Winnipeg Blue Bombers season was the 60th season for the team in the Canadian Football League (CFL) and their 85th season overall. This was the fourth season under head coach Mike O'Shea and the fourth full season under general manager Kyle Walters.

The Blue Bombers clinched a playoff berth for the second consecutive season with a win over the BC Lions on October 14, 2017. The team hosted a CFL playoff game for the first time since 2011 (and a West Division playoff game for the first time since 2003) after finishing in second place with a 12–6 record. However, they lost that West Semi-Final game to the Edmonton Eskimos.

== Offseason ==
=== CFL draft ===
The 2017 CFL draft took place on May 7, 2017. The Blue Bombers had eight selections in the eight-round draft after trading former starting quarterback Drew Willy for the first overall pick. They lost fourth and fifth round picks in trades for quarterbacks Kevin Glenn and Matt Nichols, respectively. The Bombers obtained another fourth round pick after trading down in the draft with the Stampeders.

| Round | Pick | Player | Position | School/Club team | Hometown |
|---|---|---|---|---|---|
| 1 | 1 | Faith Ekakitie | DL | Iowa | Brampton, ON |
| 1 | 8 | Geoff Gray | OL | Manitoba | Winnipeg, MB |
| 2 | 15 | Qadr Spooner | OL | McGill | Brossard, QC |
| 3 | 23 | Abubakar Conteh | DB | Grambling State | Winnipeg, MB |
| 4 | 34 | Felix Menard-Briere | K | Montreal | Sainte-Agathe-des-Monts, QC |
| 6 | 50 | Ian Marouf | DL | Guelph | Fort Erie, ON |
| 7 | 59 | Brendon Thera-Plamondon | WR | Calgary | St. Albert, AB |
| 8 | 68 | Tylor Henry | WR | Alberta | Camrose, AB |

== Preseason ==
| Week | Date | Kickoff | Opponent | Results | | TV | Venue | Attendance | Summary |
| Week | Date | Kickoff | Opponent | Score | Record | TV | Venue | Attendance | Summary |
|---|---|---|---|---|---|---|---|---|---|
| A | Sat, June 10 | 8:00 p.m. CDT | at Saskatchewan Roughriders | T 25–25 | 0–0–1 | None | Mosaic Stadium | 33,350 | Recap |
| B | Thurs, June 15 | 7:30 p.m. CDT | vs. Edmonton Eskimos | T 38–38 | 0–0–2 | None | Investors Group Field | 24,934 | Recap |

== Regular season ==
=== Standings ===
West Division
| Team | GP | W | L | T | Pts | PF | PA | Div | Stk | |
|---|---|---|---|---|---|---|---|---|---|---|
| Calgary Stampeders | 18 | 13 | 4 | 1 | 27 | 523 | 349 | 7–3 | L3 | Details |
| Winnipeg Blue Bombers | 18 | 12 | 6 | 0 | 24 | 554 | 492 | 6–4 | W1 | Details |
| Edmonton Eskimos | 18 | 12 | 6 | 0 | 24 | 510 | 495 | 5–5 | W5 | Details |
| Saskatchewan Roughriders | 18 | 10 | 8 | 0 | 20 | 510 | 430 | 4–6 | L1 | Details |
| BC Lions | 18 | 7 | 11 | 0 | 14 | 469 | 501 | 3–7 | L1 | Details |

=== Schedule ===
| Week | Date | Kickoff | Opponent | Results | | TV | Venue | Attendance | Summary |
| Week | Date | Kickoff | Opponent | Score | Record | TV | Venue | Attendance | Summary |
|---|---|---|---|---|---|---|---|---|---|
| 1 | Bye | | | | | | | | |
| 2 | Sat, July 1 | 8:00 p.m. CDT | at Saskatchewan Roughriders | W 43–40 (2OT) | 1–0 | TSN/RDS/ESPNews | Mosaic Stadium | 33,350 | Recap |
| 3 | Fri, July 7 | 7:30 p.m. CDT | vs. Calgary Stampeders | L 10–29 | 1–1 | TSN/RDS | Investors Group Field | 30,165 | Recap |
| 4 | Thurs, July 13 | 7:30 p.m. CDT | vs. Toronto Argonauts | W 33–25 | 2–1 | TSN/RDS | Investors Group Field | 25,085 | Recap |
| 5 | Fri, July 21 | 9:00 p.m. CDT | at BC Lions | L 42–45 | 2–2 | TSN | BC Place | 21,017 | Recap |
| 6 | Thurs, July 27 | 7:30 p.m. CDT | vs. Montreal Alouettes | W 41–40 | 3–2 | TSN/RDS/ESPN2 | Investors Group Field | 25,931 | Recap |
| 7 | Fri, Aug 4 | 6:00 p.m. CDT | at Ottawa Redblacks | W 33–30 | 4–2 | TSN/RDS | TD Place Stadium | 23,725 | Recap |
| 8 | Sat, Aug 12 | 6:30 p.m. CDT | at Hamilton Tiger-Cats | W 39–12 | 5–2 | TSN/RDS | Tim Hortons Field | 23,517 | Recap |
| 9 | Thurs, Aug 17 | 7:30 p.m. CDT | vs. Edmonton Eskimos | W 33–26 | 6–2 | TSN | Investors Group Field | 30,554 | Recap |
| 10 | Thurs, Aug 24 | 6:30 p.m. CDT | at Montreal Alouettes | W 34–31 (2OT) | 7–2 | TSN/RDS | Molson Stadium | 18,564 | Recap |
| 11 | Sun, Sept 3 | 3:00 p.m. CDT | at Saskatchewan Roughriders | L 24–38 | 7–3 | TSN | Mosaic Stadium | 33,350 | Recap |
| 12 | Sat, Sept 9 | 2:00 p.m. CDT | vs. Saskatchewan Roughriders | W 48–28 | 8–3 | TSN | Investors Group Field | 33,134 | Recap |
| 13 | Bye | | | | | | | | |
| 14 | Fri, Sept 22 | 7:00 p.m. CDT | vs. Ottawa Redblacks | W 29–9 | 9–3 | TSN/RDS | Investors Group Field | 26,588 | Recap |
| 15 | Sat, Sept 30 | 8:30 p.m. CDT | at Edmonton Eskimos | W 28–19 | 10–3 | TSN/RDS2 | Commonwealth Stadium | 30,524 | Recap |
| 16 | Fri, Oct 6 | 7:30 p.m. CDT | vs. Hamilton Tiger-Cats | L 13–30 | 10–4 | TSN | Investors Group Field | 26,204 | Recap |
| 17 | Sat, Oct 14 | 3:00 p.m. CDT | vs. BC Lions | W 26–20 | 11–4 | TSN/RDS2 | Investors Group Field | 26,434 | Recap |
| 18 | Sat, Oct 21 | 3:00 p.m. CDT | at Toronto Argonauts | L 28–29 | 11–5 | TSN/RDS | BMO Field | 15,532 | Recap |
| 19 | Sat, Oct 28 | 3:00 p.m. CDT | vs. BC Lions | L 27–36 | 11–6 | TSN/RDS2 | Investors Group Field | 25,034 | Recap |
| 20 | Fri, Nov 3 | 8:30 p.m. CDT | at Calgary Stampeders | W 23–5 | 12–6 | TSN | McMahon Stadium | 24,281 | Recap |

== Post-season ==
=== Schedule ===
| Game | Date | Kickoff | Opponent | Results | | TV | Venue | Attendance | Summary |
| Game | Date | Kickoff | Opponent | Score | Record | TV | Venue | Attendance | Summary |
|---|---|---|---|---|---|---|---|---|---|
| West Semi-Final | Sun, Nov 12 | 3:30 p.m. CST | vs. Edmonton Eskimos | L 32–39 | 0–1 | TSN/RDS/ESPN2 | Investors Group Field | 27,244 | Recap |

== Roster ==
2017 Winnipeg Blue Bombers final roster
| Quarterbacks: 6 Dominique Davis; 13 Dan LeFevour; 15 Matt Nichols; Running backs: 20 Tim Flanders; 33 Andrew Harris; 24 Mike Miller; 37 Christophe Normand; 32 John Rush; Receivers: 2 Matt Coates; 89 Clarence Denmark; 7 Weston Dressler; 83 Julian Feoli-Gudino; 81 Chris Givens; 84 Ryan Lankford; 5 L'Damian Washington; 80 Drew Wolitarsky | Offensive linemen: 66 Stanley Bryant T; 69 Sukh Chungh G; 59 Michael Couture C; 57 Manase Foketi T; 61 Matthias Goossen C; 51 Jermarcus Hardrick T/G; 53 Patrick Neufeld G/T; Defensive linemen: 43 Trent Corney DE; 94 Jackson Jeffcoat DE; 67 Cory Johnson DT; 92 Drake Nevis DT; 54 Tristan Okpalaugo DE; 95 Jake Thomas DT; Special teams: 9 Justin Medlock K/P; 46 Chad Rempel LS | Linebackers: 34 Jesse Briggs; 44 Shayne Gauthier; 10 Sam Hurl; 50 Kyle Knox; 52 Thomas Miles; 45 Jovan Santos-Knox; 38 Ian Wild; Defensive backs: 21 Brandon Alexander; 25 Kahlen Branning; 3 Kevin Fogg; 23 T. J. Heath; 0 Derek Jones; 16 Taylor Loffler; 8 Chris Randle; 22 Brian Walker | Practice roster: 35 Zach Bauman RB; 49 Shayon Green DE; 91 Ian Marouf DT; 27 Robert Porter DB; 40 Frank Renaud LB; 64 Qadr Spooner G; 29 Darnell Walker Jr. DB; 19 Kyrie Wilson LB; Injured list: 1 Darvin Adams WR; 60 Travis Bond G; 56 Faith Ekakitie DT; 48 Jevaris Jones LB; 31 Maurice Leggett DB; 55 Jamaal Westerman DE; 14 Myles White WR; Suspended: 4 Roc Carmichael DB; Italics indicate International players |

== Coaching staff ==
Winnipeg Blue Bombers Staff
| Front office: Owner – Community owned (non-profit corporation owned by members); Chairperson of the board of governors – Brock Bulbuck; President/CEO – Wade Miller; General manager of football operations – Kyle Walters; Assistant General Manager / Director of U.S. Scouting – Danny McManus; Assistant general manager / director of player personnel – Ted Goveia; National scout – Craig Smith; Director of football operations – Dave Siddall; Head equipment manager – Brad Fotty; Assistant equipment manager – Kevin Todd; Assistant equipment manager – Jared Cronk; Video coordinator – Kent Anderson; Assistant video coordinator – Colin Thurston | Head coaches: Head coach – Mike O'Shea; Offensive coaches: Offensive coordinator/receivers – Paul LaPolice; Quarterbacks – Buck Pierce; Running backs – Kevin Bourgoin; Offensive line – Bob Wylie; Assistant offensive line – Marty Costello; Defensive coaches: Defensive coordinator – Richie Hall; Linebackers – Glen Young; Defensive line – Todd Howard; Defensive backs – Tony Missick; Special teams coaches: Special teams coordinator – Paul Boudreau; → Coaching staff |
