= Kevin Fogg =

American gridiron football player (born 1990)

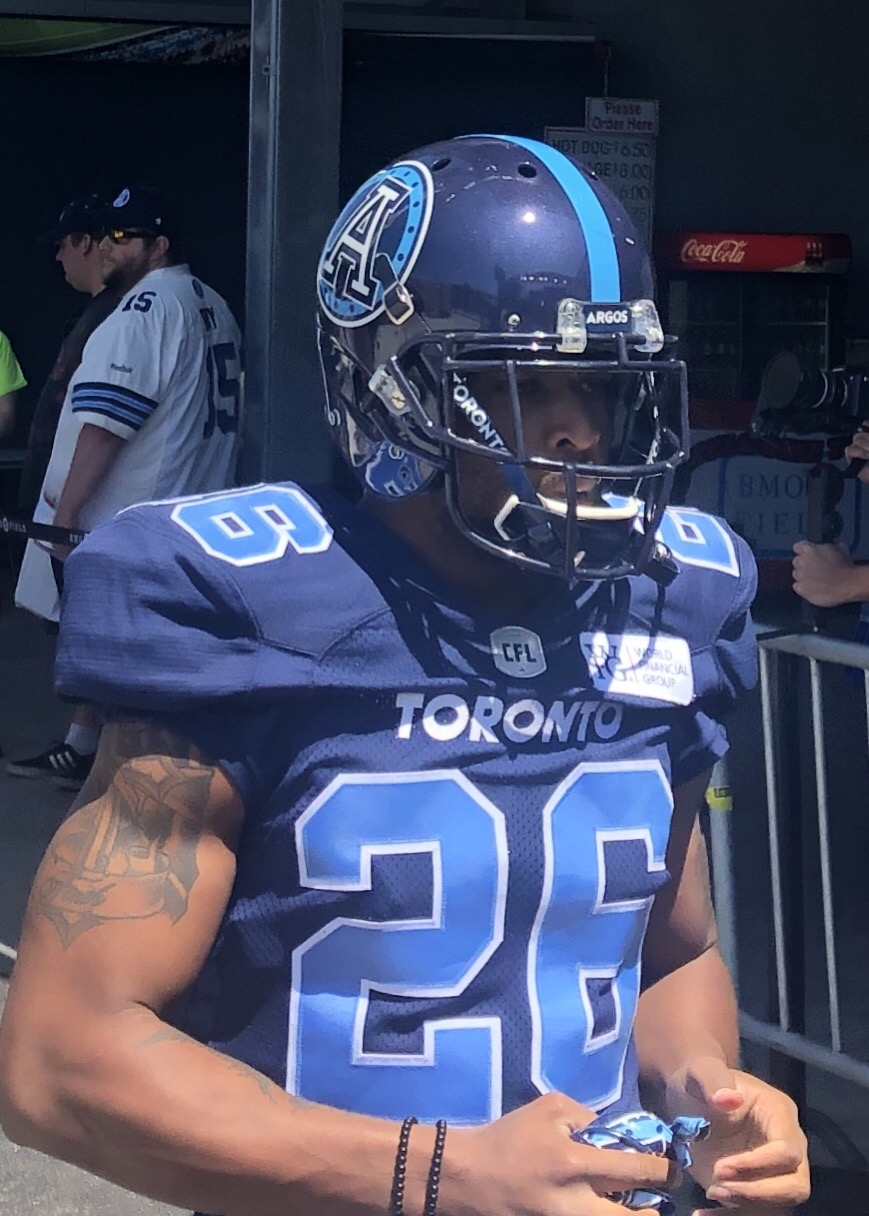
- Fogg with the Toronto Argonauts in 2019

Profile
- Positions: Defensive back, return specialist

Personal information
- Born: October 6, 1990 (age 36); Raleigh, North Carolina, U.S.
- Listed height: 5 ft 10 in (1.78 m)
- Listed weight: 185 lb (84 kg)

Career information
- High school: Apex (Apex, North Carolina)
- College: Liberty

Career history
- 2014: Miami Dolphins*
- 2014: Brooklyn Bolts
- 2014–2015: Pittsburgh Steelers*
- 2016–2018: Winnipeg Blue Bombers
- 2019: Toronto Argonauts
- 2020: Montreal Alouettes*
- * Offseason or practice squad member only

Awards and highlights
- 3× Big South Conference champion (2012, 2013, 2014)
- Stats at Pro Football Reference
- Stats at CFL.ca

Kevin Fogg (born October 6, 1990) is an American former professional football defensive back and punt returner who played in the Canadian Football League (CFL) for four seasons. He played college football at Liberty University.

== Professional career ==
Fogg bounced around the NFL from 2014 to 2015, including a stint in the developmental Fall Experimental Football League (FXFL).

=== Winnipeg Blue Bombers ===
Fogg signed with the Winnipeg Blue Bombers of the CFL for the 2016 season. Fogg spent three seasons in Winnipeg as a starting defensive back, accumulating 154 tackles, 10 interceptions, 6 forced fumbles, and one defensive touchdown. Fogg was also utilized as a punt returner, amassing 2259 yards and a touchdown on 200 returns. He became a free agent in February 2019.

=== Toronto Argonauts ===
Near the end of the first day of free agency, Fogg signed with the Toronto Argonauts, alongside fellow returner Chris Rainey. He played in seven games for the team, recording 24 defensive tackles and one interception. As a pending free agent in 2020, he was released during the free agency negotiation window on February 7, 2020.

=== Montreal Alouettes ===
On February 18, 2020, it was announced that Fogg had signed with the Montreal Alouettes. However, the 2020 CFL season was cancelled and he did not play that year. He became a free agent upon the expiry of his contract on February 9, 2021.

== CFL statistics ==
		Defence							Punt returns
Year	Team	Games	Tackles	ST	Sacks	Int	TD	FF	PR	Yds	Avg	Lg	TD
2016	WPG	18	79	1	1	4	0	2	53	754	14.2	72	0
2017	WPG	15	29	2	0	2	0	1	67	775	11.6	88	1
2018	WPG	16	46	0	0	4	1	3	80	730	9.1	55	0
2019	TOR	7	24	0	0	1	0	1	4	60	15.0	39	0
CFL totals		56	178	3	1	11	1	7	204	2319	11.4	88	1
