= Maurice Leggett =

American football player (born 1986)

No. 31, 19
- Position: Cornerback

Personal information
- Born: October 2, 1986 (age 40); McKeesport, Pennsylvania, U.S.
- Listed height: 6 ft 0 in (1.83 m)
- Listed weight: 217 lb (98 kg)

Career information
- High school: Mount Zion (Jonesboro, Georgia)
- College: Valdosta State
- NFL draft: 2008: undrafted

Career history
- Kansas City Chiefs (2008–2010); Detroit Lions (2011)*; Utah Blaze (2013); Philadelphia Soul (2014)*; Winnipeg Blue Bombers (2014–2018); Albany Empire (2019); Columbus Lions (2022); Albany Empire (2023)
- * Offseason or practice squad member only

Awards and highlights
- ArenaBowl champion (2019); CFL West All Star (2016); Second-team All-NAL (2022); 2× NCAA Division II national champion (2004, 2007)

Career NFL statistics
- Tackles: 54
- Pass breakups: 11
- Interceptions: 1
- Stats at Pro Football Reference

Career CFL statistics
- Tackles: 253
- Sacks: 12
- Forced fumbles: 6
- Interceptions: 16
- Stats at CFL.ca

Career AFL statistics
- Tackles: 76
- Pass breakups: 22
- Forced fumbles: 3
- Fumble recoveries: 1
- Interceptions: 5
- Stats at ArenaFan.com

Maurice Lamar Leggett (also known as Moe Leggett) (born October 2, 1986) is an American former professional football player who was a cornerback in the National Football League (NFL), Canadian Football League (CFL), and Arena Football League (AFL). He entered the NFL as an undrafted free agent in May 2008 with the Kansas City Chiefs. He played college football for the Valdosta State Blazers.

== Early life and college ==
Leggett attended and played football at Mount Zion High School in Jonesboro, Georgia. He played running back during high school. His jersey from the school was retired in 2009. He attended Valdosta State University and played for the Blazers, helping them win two Division II national championships; in 2004 and 2007. He was honored with first-team All-Gulf South honors in 2006 as well.

== Professional career ==
=== Kansas City Chiefs ===
Leggett was undrafted in the 2008 NFL draft, and signed with the Kansas City Chiefs (NFL) on May 2, 2008, as an undrafted free agent. After a productive rookie season, he was awarded the Mack Lee Hill Award for Most Outstanding Rookie for the Chiefs. Leggett was the first undrafted rookie to win the award. In November 2009, he was placed in injured reserve for a shoulder injury. In 2010, he was again placed on injured reserve, and was eventually not resigned.

=== Detroit Lions ===
On July 29, 2011, Leggett signed with the Detroit Lions. He was released on August 17, after his injury didn't heal.

=== Utah Blaze ===
Leggett signed with the Utah Blaze of the Arena Football League (AFL) in 2013 to resume his football career. He had 69 tackles and five interceptions playing in 15 games during his first season in the AFL.

=== Philadelphia Soul ===
During the offseason, Leggett signed with the Philadelphia Soul, but never played with the team.

=== Winnipeg Blue Bombers ===
In 2014, Leggett signed with the Winnipeg Blue Bombers of the Canadian Football League. In his first CFL year, Leggett was Winnipeg's nominee for the CFL outstanding defensive player of the year award. He finished his first CFL season tied for second in the league with five interceptions, including three in one game. At the end of the season, he was rewarded with a three-year contract extension. Leggett continued his strong play in 2015, contributing 59 tackles (including five on special teams), five quarterback sacks and one interception.

In 2016, Leggett was voted Winnipeg's top defensive player, and was the CFL's co-leader with seven interceptions, three of which he returned for touchdowns.

In 2017, Leggett was named a "Shaw CFL Top Performer of the Week" after scoring two touchdowns in the Banjo Bowl win over the Saskatchewan Roughriders. It was only the third time in the past 30 years that a CFL defensive player had multiple touchdowns in a game. On October 15, 2017, nearing the end of the 2017 regular season, Leggett suffered a torn Achilles tendon and was declared out for the rest of the season. In 13 games he had contributed 50 tackles, three interceptions and three sacks. In February 2018, less than a week before becoming a free agent, Leggett and the Bombers agreed to a one-year contract extension. Leggett suffered another serious injury during the 2018 CFL season and was carted off the team's practice field on October 22, 2018. Leggett was released by the Winnipeg Blue Bombers on November 21, 2018, after the Bombers were eliminated from the playoffs.

=== Albany Empire ===
Leggett returned to the Arena Football League when he signed with the Albany Empire in time for the final regular season game. After advancing in the playoffs, Leggett recorded Albany's first points in ArenaBowl XXXII when he intercepted a pass and returned it 54 yards for a touchdown. Leggett also recovered a fumble en route to Albany's first championship. The league folded in November 2019.

== CFL statistics ==
		Defence
Year	Team	Games	Tackles	ST	Sacks	Int	TD	FF
2014	WPG	16	65	1	2	5	0	2
2015	WPG	17	54	5	5	1	0	0
2016	WPG	17	51	0	1	7	3	1
2017	WPG	13	50	0	3	3	1	3
2018	WPG	9	33	2	1	0	0	0
CFL totals		72	253	8	12	16	4	6

== Coaching career ==
Leggett was the last interim head coach of the National Arena League's Albany Empire in 2023 before the team was removed from the league.

== Personal life ==
Leggett has a son, Malik Price, born in 2007. He participates in ballet, performing with the Royal Winnipeg Ballet in a performance of The Nutcracker. Leggett has been a fan of ballet since taking a ballet class in high school. He also has interest in opera and frequently listens to classical music. Leggett majored in criminal justice in college, and also studied voice and piano. He cites Ed Reed and Ray Lewis as his inspirations in football.
