= Matt Nichols =

American football player (born 1987)

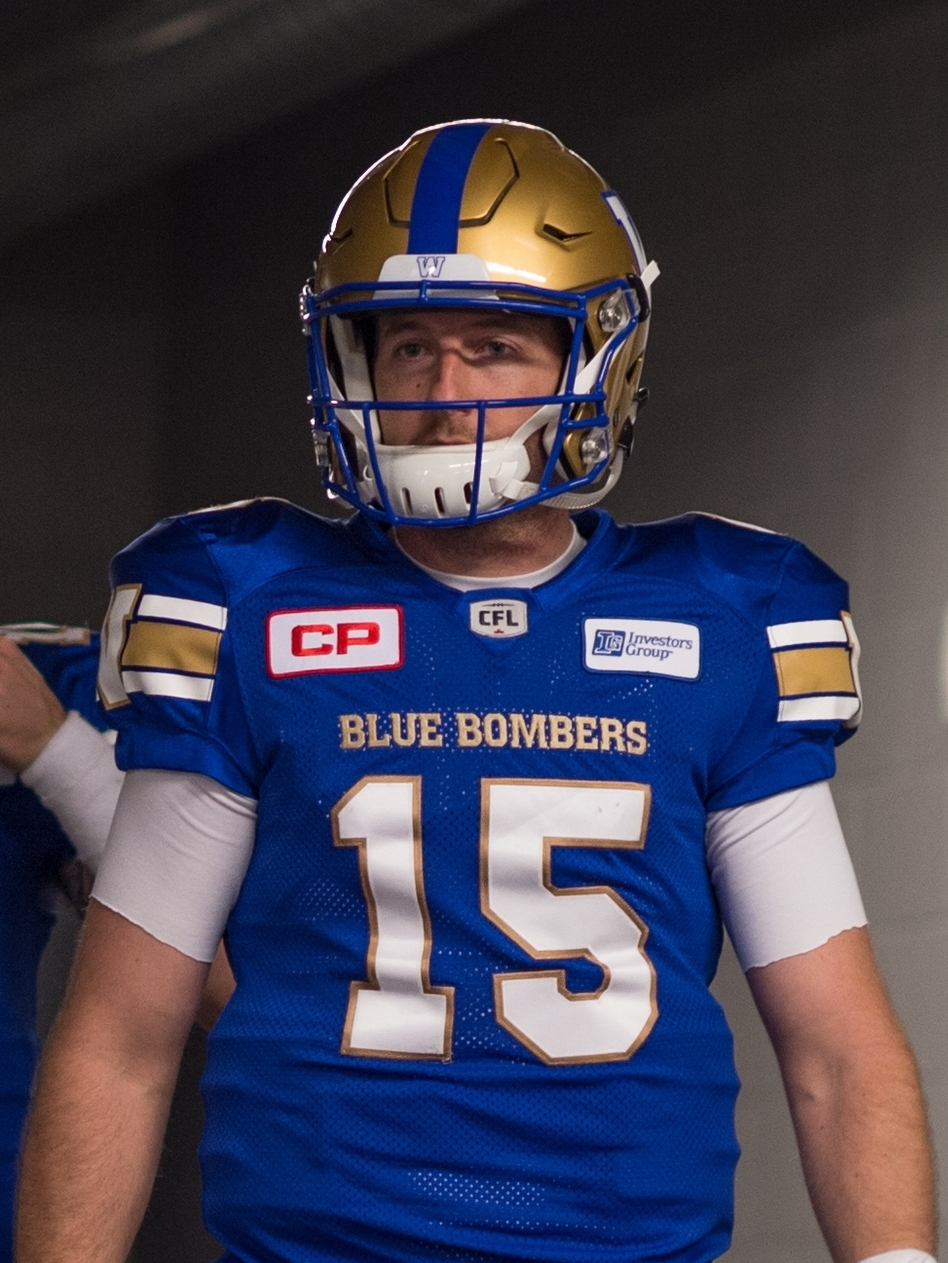
- Nichols with the Winnipeg Blue Bombers in 2016

No. 15
- Position: Quarterback

Personal information
- Born: March 19, 1987 (age 39); Redding, California, U.S.
- Listed height: 6 ft 2 in (1.88 m)
- Listed weight: 215 lb (98 kg)

Career information
- High school: West Valley
- College: Eastern Washington
- NFL draft: 2010: undrafted

Career history
- 2010: Dallas Cowboys*
- 2010–2015: Edmonton Eskimos
- 2015–2019: Winnipeg Blue Bombers
- 2020: Toronto Argonauts*
- 2021: Ottawa Redblacks
- * Offseason or practice squad member only

Awards and highlights
- Grey Cup champion (2019); 2× Big Sky Conference Offensive Player of the Year (2007, 2009)
- Stats at CFL.ca

Matt Nichols (born March 19, 1987) is an American former professional football quarterback who played in the Canadian Football League (CFL). Nichols played college football at Eastern Washington. He was a member of the Dallas Cowboys, Winnipeg Blue Bombers, Edmonton Eskimos, Toronto Argonauts, and Ottawa Redblacks.

== College career ==
Nichols was a four-year starter at Eastern Washington, where he compiled 996 completions on 1608 attempts (62%) for 12,616 yards, 96 touchdowns and 46 interceptions in 47 games (42 starts). Nichols' career passing yards are the most in Big Sky Conference history and ranks sixth overall in NCAA history. Nichols also holds the school record for touchdown passes with 96 and was named the 2007 and 2009 Big Sky Conference Offensive Player of the Year. The Business Management major attended college with former Winnipeg Blue Bomber defensive end Greg Peach.

== Professional career ==
=== Dallas Cowboys ===
Nichols attended training camp with the Dallas Cowboys as an undrafted free agent in 2010 and appeared in two pre-season games, recording 10 completions in 16 attempts for 81 yards and two interceptions. He was released on August 19.

=== Edmonton Eskimos ===
Nichols was signed as a free agent by the Edmonton Eskimos of the Canadian Football League on October 13, 2010. Nichols spent the next three games on the practice roster before being released on November 2. On February 4, 2011, he was re-signed by Edmonton through the end of the 2012 season. In the playoffs of the 2012 CFL season Nichols sustained a devastating broken leg injury. He worked hard all off-season in order to be able to play for the 2013 CFL season. Entering the 2013 CFL season Nichols was in open competition with Mike Reilly for the starting quarterback job. Nichols was awarded the start for the first preseason game on June 14, 2013. However, he left the game early on after attempting to tackle a player after throwing an interception. The tests revealed that he had torn ACL and required surgery; this caused him to miss the entire 2013 season. In the offseason, Nichols was signed to a two-year contract extension through the 2015 CFL season.

=== Winnipeg Blue Bombers ===
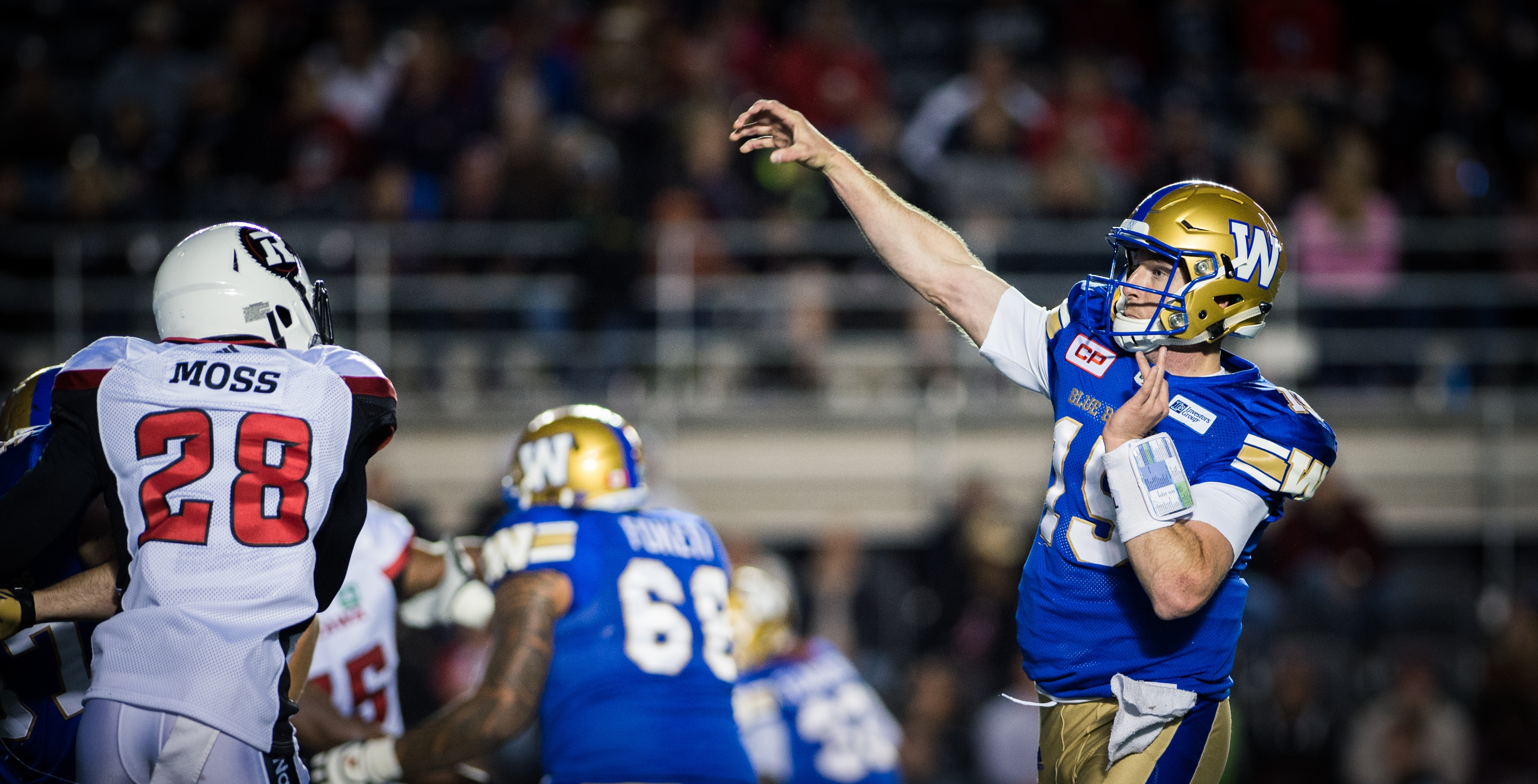
Nichols with the Winnipeg Blue Bombers during a pre-season game in 2016

Nichols was traded to the Winnipeg Blue Bombers, on September 2, 2015. Nichols played in numerous games for the Bombers in 2015, due in large part to various injuries to starting quarterback Drew Willy. Nichols started the 2016 season as the backup to Drew Willy, however following a 1–4 start to the season head-coach Mike O'Shea announced that Nichols would be the starting quarterback for their week 6 match-up against Edmonton. In 2016, Nichols began his tenure as the Bombers starting quarterback with 7 wins in a row propelling the Bombers to a record of 8–4. The Bombers would finish the season with a record of 11–7, finishing 3rd place in the Western Division. In the playoffs the Bombers were unable to hold onto a 19-point lead over the BC Lions, falling 32–31 thus ending their 2016 campaign. Drew Willy was traded in the middle of the season, and veteran quarterback Kevin Glenn was released in January 2017, confirming the Bombers belief that he could be their starting quarterback for the foreseeable future. This sentiment was reinforced when they signed him to a 3-year contract extension on January 18, 2017. Nichols had a breakout 2017 season, setting career highs in every major category (attempts, completions, yards, touchdowns). Nichols led the Bombers to a 12-6 record, clinching a home playoff game; however, the team was defeated by the Eskimos in the first round.

During the lead up to the start of the 2018 season Nichols suffered a non-contact knee injury in practice, and it was announced he would miss four to six weeks, returning in four as he made his 2018 debut on July 7 against the BC Lions. Nichols had a strong season for the Blue Bombers, leading the team to a record of 10-8 and a playoff berth. The Bombers advanced to the West division finals after defeating the Saskatchewan Roughriders 23-18 on the road, but was unable to overcome the Calgary Stampeders who went on to win the 106th Grey Cup. Nichols was having an outstanding 2019 season and was leading the league in touchdown passes (15) and passer rating (107.2), but suffered an upper-body injury in Week 10 against the BC Lions which caused him to be placed on the six-game injured reserve. On September 26, 2019, it was revealed that Nichols underwent shoulder surgery which meant that he would remain sidelined for the remainder of the 2019 season. Teammate Chris Streveler took over the helm and the Bombers traded for Zach Collaros; these two quarterbacks would go on to help the team win their first championship in 29 years at the 107th Grey Cup. Collaros was signed to a two-year extension in January 2020 following the Grey Cup and the team released Nichols early on January 28, 2020 so that he could find a role as a starter in the CFL.

=== Toronto Argonauts ===
Nichols signed with the Toronto Argonauts to a three-year contract on February 7, 2020. He did not play in 2020 due to the cancellation of the 2020 CFL season and, following a contract renegotiation dispute, was released on January 31, 2021.

=== Ottawa Redblacks ===
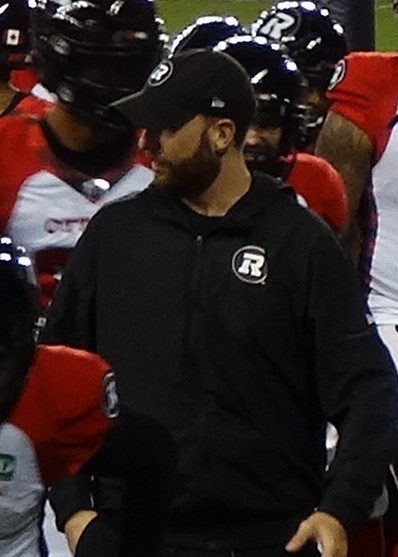
Nichols with the Ottawa Redblacks in 2021

A few hours after being released by Toronto, Nichols signed with the Ottawa Redblacks, who subsequently released quarterback Nick Arbuckle. Nichols and the Redblacks offense struggled in their season opener, scoring only three field goals with Nichols only managing 72 passing yards on 20 attempts. Nichols and the Redblacks continued to struggle in the subsequent weeks, culminating with Nichols being benched in Week 5 in favour of Dominique Davis. Nichols came in to replace an infective Davis in the third quarter of the team's Week 8 loss to the Tiger-Cats, however he had to be taken out of the game after suffering a wrist injury. He became a free agent upon the expiry of his contract on February 8, 2022. He officially retired in July of 2022.

== CFL career statistics ==
=== Regular season ===
		Passing									Rushing
Year	Team	GA	GS	Att	Comp	Pct	Yards	TD	Int	Rating	Att	Yards	Avg	Long	TD	Fumb
2012	EDM	18	2	83	48	57.8	884	7	3	107.7	10	76	7.6	19	1	3
2014	EDM	18	4	151	94	62.3	1,014	4	5	77.0	16	41	2.6	6	2	2
2015	EDM	9	7	209	128	61.2	1,488	8	10	75.6	10	21	2.1	7	0	3
2015	WPG	9	7	248	149	60.1	1,757	10	7	83.4	19	112	5.9	23	0	2
2016	WPG	18	13	471	327	69.4	3,666	18	9	97.1	35	90	2.6	15	6	2
2017	WPG	18	17	579	411	71.0	4,472	28	8	103.8	26	188	7.2	41	2	5
2018	WPG	15	14	392	254	64.8	3,146	18	13	91.0	15	52	3.5	12	1	2
2019	WPG	9	9	240	171	71.3	1,936	15	5	107.2	9	37	4.1	18	1	1
2020	TOR	Season cancelled									Season cancelled
2021	OTT	6	4	96	63	65.6	544	0	3	67.4	7	22	3.1	9	0	2
CFL totals		120	77	2,469	1,645	66.6	18,907	108	63	93.5	147	639	4.3	41	13	22

=== Postseason ===
Playoffs				Passing					Rushing		
Year	Game	GP	GS	Att	Cmp	Yards	TD	Int	Att	Yards	TD
2011	West Semi-Final	0	-	-	-	-	-	-	-	-	-
2011	West Final	0	-	-	-	-	-	-	-	-	-
2012	*East Semi-Final	1	0	7	3	51	0	0	2	2	0
2014	West Semi-Final	1	1	23	12	59	0	1	0	-	-
2014	West Final	1	0	15	9	92	0	0	1	2	0
2016	West Semi-Final	1	1	40	26	390	2	0	1	3	0
2017	West Semi-Final	1	1	48	35	371	3	0	2	8	0
2018	West Semi-Final	1	1	22	16	169	1	0	1	5	0
2018	West Final	1	1	32	15	156	0	0	2	10	0
2019	West Semi-Final	0	-	-	-	-	-	-	-	-	-
2019	West Final	0	-	-	-	-	-	-	-	-	-
CFL totals		7	5	187	116	1288	6	1	9	30	0

*Team qualified for Crossover

=== Grey Cup ===
Grey Cup				Passing					Rushing		
Year	Team	GP	GS	Att	Cmp	Yards	TD	Int	Att	Yards	TD
2019	WPG	0	-	-	-	-	-	-	-	-	-
CFL totals		0	-	-	-	-	-	-	-	-	-
