= Don Unamba =

American gridiron football player (born 1989)

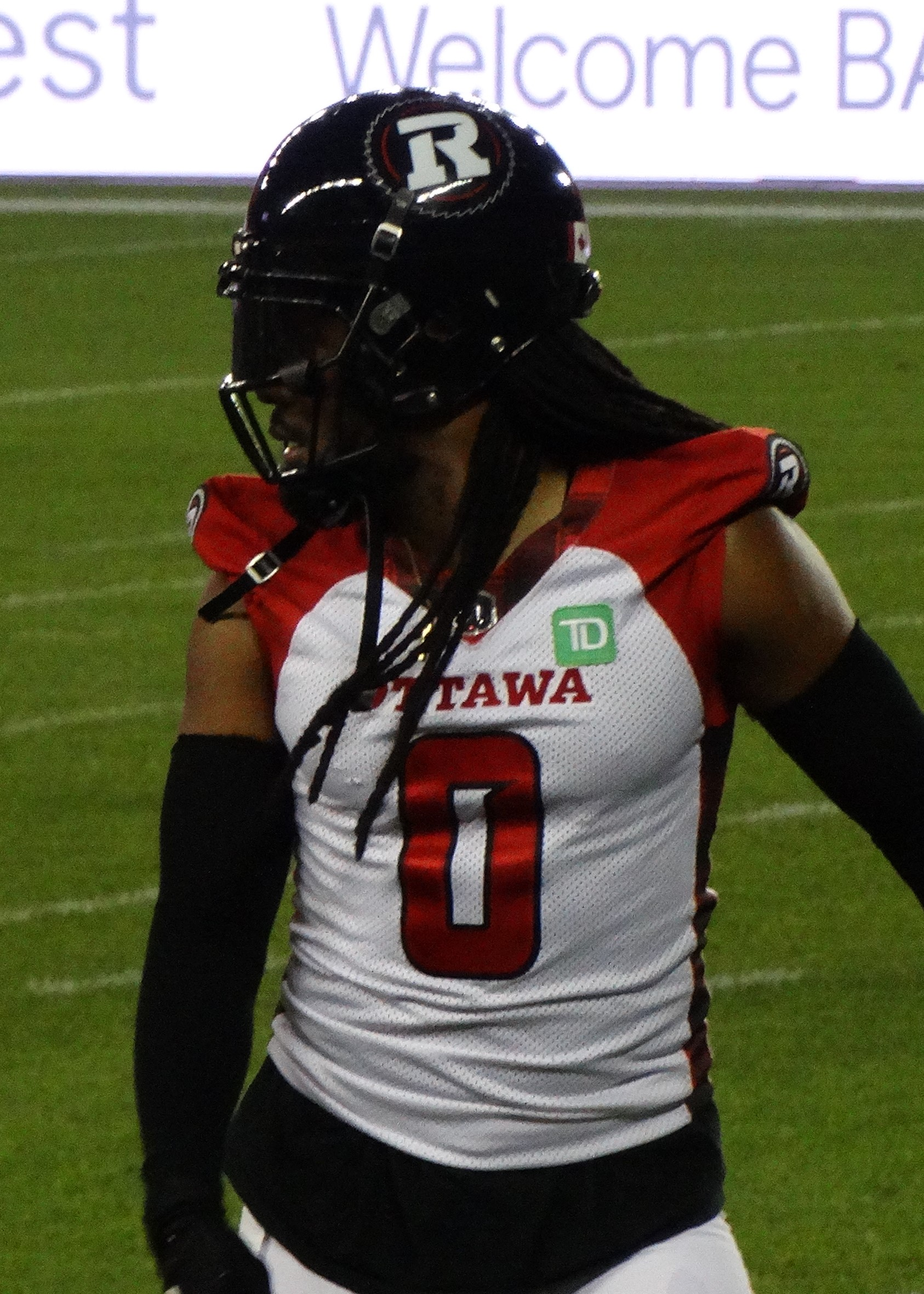
- Unamba with the Ottawa Redblacks in 2021

No. 13, 22, 39, 1, 0
- Position: Defensive back

Personal information
- Born: February 23, 1989 (age 37); Arlington, Texas, U.S.
- Listed height: 6 ft 1 in (1.85 m)
- Listed weight: 195 lb (88 kg)

Career information
- High school: Hurst (TX) L. D. Bell
- College: Southern Arkansas
- NFL draft: 2013: undrafted

Career history
- St. Louis Rams (2013)*; Buffalo Bills (2013)*; Winnipeg Blue Bombers (2014–2015); Saskatchewan Roughriders (2015); Salt Lake Screaming Eagles (2017); Hamilton Tiger-Cats (2017–2018); Edmonton Eskimos (2019); Ottawa Redblacks (2020–2021)
- * Offseason or practice squad member only

Awards and highlights
- CFL All-Star (2018); CFL East All-Star (2018)
- Stats at CFL.ca

Donald Nneji Unamba (born February 23, 1989) is an American former professional football defensive back who played in the Canadian Football League (CFL).

== College career ==
Unamba played college football for Southern Arkansas University.

== Professional career ==
Unamba signed with the St. Louis Rams as an undrafted free agent on May 13, 2013. He was released on June 14, 2013.

Unamba signed with the Buffalo Bills on August 1, 2013. He was released on August 19, 2013.

He was signed by the Winnipeg Blue Bombers on April 2, 2014.

On August 18, 2015, Unamba was signed by the Saskatchewan Roughriders, who signed him to the practice roster.

On December 19, 2016, Unamba signed with the Salt Lake Screaming Eagles.

Unamba re-signed with the Ottawa Redblacks on February 9, 2021. He played for one season with the Redblacks and became a free agent upon the expiry of his contract on February 8, 2022.
