= Trent Corney =

Canadian football player (born 1993)

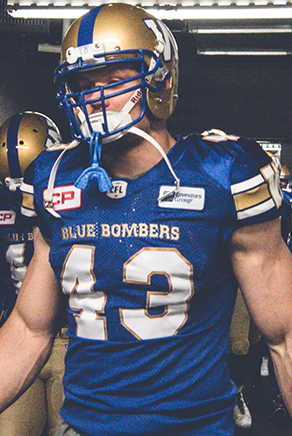
- Corney in 2016

No. 43
- Position: Defensive end

Personal information
- Born: November 3, 1993 (age 33); Brockville, Ontario, Canada
- Listed height: 6 ft 4 in (1.93 m)
- Listed weight: 310 lb (141 kg)

Career information
- College: Virginia
- CFL draft: 2016: 1st round, 9th overall pick

Career history
- 2016–2018: Winnipeg Blue Bombers
- Stats at CFL.ca

Trent Corney (born March 11, 1993) is a professional Canadian football defensive end and bodybuilder. He was drafted ninth overall by the Blue Bombers in the 2016 CFL draft and signed with the team on May 24, 2016. He played college football for the Virginia Cavaliers.
