= Derek Dennis =

American gridiron football player (born 1988)

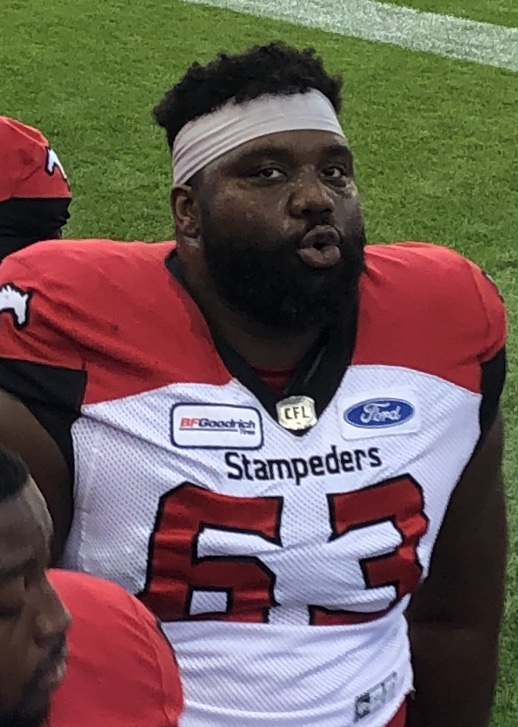
- Dennis with the Calgary Stampeders in 2019

No. 64, 63
- Position: Offensive tackle

Personal information
- Born: July 16, 1988 (age 38); Queens, New York, U.S.
- Listed height: 6 ft 3 in (1.91 m)
- Listed weight: 325 lb (147 kg)

Career information
- High school: Trinity (Pawling, New York)
- College: Temple
- NFL draft: 2012: undrafted

Career history
- Miami Dolphins (2012)*; New England Patriots (2012)*; Arizona Rattlers (2013)*; Chicago Bears (2012–2013)*; Carolina Panthers (2014)*; Arizona Rattlers (2015); Calgary Stampeders (2015–2016); Saskatchewan Roughriders (2017); Calgary Stampeders (2018–2019); Team 9 (2020)*; New York Guardians (2020); Edmonton Elks (2021)*; Calgary Stampeders (2022)
- * Offseason or practice squad member only

Awards and highlights
- Grey Cup champion (2018); 2× CFL All-Star (2016, 2022); 4× CFL West All-Star (2016, 2018, 2019, 2022); CFL's Most Outstanding Offensive Lineman Award (2016)
- Stats at Pro Football Reference
- Stats at CFL.ca
- Stats at ArenaFan.com

Derek Dennis (born July 16, 1988) is an American former professional football offensive tackle who played in the Canadian Football League (CFL). He played college football at Temple. He was a member of the Miami Dolphins, New England Patriots, Arizona Rattlers, Chicago Bears, Carolina Panthers, Calgary Stampeders, Saskatchewan Roughriders, New York Guardians, and Edmonton Elks.

== Early life ==
Dennis did not start playing football until his junior year at Peekskill High School in Peekskill, New York. He also helped the Peesksill basketball team win consecutive state titles in 2005 and 2006. He then transferred to Trinity-Pawling School in Pawling, New York his senior year as they had a more established football program. Dennis played offensive guard, tight end and defensive end at Trinity-Pawling. He recorded 149 tackles, ten sacks, nine forced fumbles, four interceptions, eight receptions for 220 yards and 35 pancake blocks during his varsity career. He earned All-League, All-Conference and Honorable Mention All-Section honors in football as well. Dennis averaged fifteen points and eleven rebounds per game in basketball. He graduated from Trinity-Pawling in 2007. He also spent time playing for the New York Gauchos AAU team.

== College career ==
Dennis played for the Temple Owls of Temple University from 2007 to 2011. He played in twelve games, starting ten, as a right guard his freshman year in 2007. He played in twelve games, starting six, in 2008. Dennis played in three games, with one start at right tackle, in 2009 before missing the remainder of the season and being redshirted due to a knee injury. He appeared in twelve games, starting two at right guard, one at left guard and four at left tackle, during the 2010 season. He started thirteen games at left guard his redshirt senior year in 2011. Dennis then played in the 2012 East–West Shrine Game. He graduated from Temple in August 2011 with a degree in journalism.

== Professional career ==
Pre-draft measurables
Height	Weight	40-yard dash	10-yard split	20-yard split	20-yard shuttle	Three-cone drill	Vertical jump	Broad jump	Bench press
6 ft 3 1/8 in (1.91 m)	315 lb (143 kg)	5.30 s	1.94 s	3.06 s	4.85 s	8.21 s	24.5 in (0.62 m)	8 ft 5 in (2.57 m)	25 reps
All values from Temple's Pro Day

=== Miami Dolphins ===
Dennis was signed by the Miami Dolphins of the National Football League (NFL) on May 4, 2012 after going undrafted in the 2012 NFL draft. He was released by the team on July 26, 2012. His release from the Dolphins was shown on Hard Knocks.

=== New England Patriots ===
Dennis signed with the NFL's New England Patriots on August 2, 2012. He was released by the Patriots on August 31, 2012.

=== Arizona Rattlers ===
Dennis was assigned to the Arizona Rattlers of the Arena Football League (AFL) on November 6, 2012. He was exempted on November 29, 2012. He was activated from Other League Exempt on April 7, 2015 and played for the team during the 2015 season, catching three passes for sixteen yards. Dennis was placed on Other League Exempt on October 22, 2015.

=== Chicago Bears ===
On November 27, 2012, Dennis was signed to the practice squad of the Chicago Bears' of the NFL. He signed a reserve/future contract with the Bears on December 31, 2012. He was released by the team on August 30, 2013. Dennis was signed to the Bears' practice squad on September 4 and released by the team on September 9, 2013.

=== Carolina Panthers ===
Dennis signed with the NFL's Carolina Panthers on January 4, 2014. He was released by the Panthers on August 30, 2014. He was signed to the team's practice squad on September 10, 2014. Dennis signed a futures contract with the Panthers on January 13, 2015. He was released by the Panthers on April 4, 2015.

=== Calgary Stampeders (first stint) ===
On September 21, 2015, Dennis was signed to the practice roster of the Calgary Stampeders of the CFL. He was promoted to the active roster on October 1. He made his CFL debut on October 2, 2015 against the Hamilton Tiger-Cats. Dennis played in five games, all starts, at left tackle for the team during the 2015 regular season. He also started both of the Stampeders' playoff games at left tackle.

2016 was a breakout season for Dennis. He started all 18 regular-season games, 15 starts at left tackle, two at left guard and one at right guard. He was an integral part of a Stampeder unit that allowed the fewest sacks in the CFL in 2016 with 20 (11 fewer than the second-best team in that category) and also helped tailback Jerome Messam run for a league-leading 1,198 yards. Because of his accomplishments he was the winner of the CFL's Most Outstanding Offensive Lineman Award.

=== Saskatchewan Roughriders ===
On February 14, 2017, Dennis was signed by the Saskatchewan Roughriders. After playing just one season with the team, Dennis was released by the Roughriders on February 13, 2018.

=== Calgary Stampeders (second stint) ===
Three days after his release from the Roughriders, Dennis re-signed with the Stampeders on February 16, 2018. He started all 18 regular season games and two post-season games for the Stampeders at left tackle and finished the season as a member of the 106th Grey Cup championship team. In 2019 Dennis started 16 game's for the Stampeders, 14 at LT and 2 at RT, and was named a West Division All-Star for a third time in his career. Dennis was not re-signed by the Stampeders following the 2019 season and became a free agent on February 11, 2020.

=== XFL ===
On February 18, 2020, one week after becoming a free agent, Dennis signed with the XFL as a member of the league's Team 9 practice squad. He signed with the XFL's New York Guardians on February 25, 2020. He played in the final two games (February 29 and March 7) before the rest of the XFL season was cancelled due to the COVID-19 pandemic. He later had his contract terminated when the XFL suspended operations on April 10, 2020.

=== Edmonton Elks ===
Dennis signed a two-year contract with the Edmonton Football Team on January 7, 2021. He chose not to play in the 2021 season for personal reasons, and the Elks placed him on the retired list on June 23, 2021. On July 19, Dennis requested to be released by the Elks, implying that he is not retired and would like to play elsewhere in 2021. After former Elks general manager, Brock Sunderland, was fired and Chris Jones replaced him, Dennis was finally granted a release from his contract on December 28, 2021.

=== Calgary Stampeders (third stint) ===
On January 12, 2022, it was announced that Dennis had signed with the Stampeders. On September 24, 2022 Dennis was carted off the field with a leg injury. Two days later it was announced he would miss the remainder of the season with a cracked fibula, which would require surgery. Dennis had played in 14 games for the Stamps during the 2022 season. Following the season he was named a CFL All-Star for the second time in his career. On January 30, 2023, Dennis and the Stamps agreed on a one-year contract extension. However, following the 2023 preseason, he was released on June 3, 2023.
