= Taylor Loffler =

Canadian football player (born 1992)

Profile
- Position: Defensive back

Personal information
- Born: February 25, 1992 (age 34); Kelowna, British Columbia, Canada
- Listed height: 6 ft 4 in (1.93 m)
- Listed weight: 220 lb (100 kg)

Career information
- College: Boise State
- University: British Columbia
- CFL draft: 2016: 3rd round, 19th overall pick

Career history
- 2016–2018: Winnipeg Blue Bombers
- 2019–2020: Montreal Alouettes

Awards and highlights
- 3× CFL All-Star (2016–2018); 3× CFL West All-Star (2016–2018); Vanier Cup champion (2015)
- Stats at CFL.ca

Taylor Loffler (born February 25, 1992) is a Canadian former professional football safety. In the Canadian Football League (CFL)'s Amateur Scouting Bureau final rankings, he was ranked as the 11th best of the players eligible in the 2016 CFL draft. He was then drafted in the third round, 19th overall, by the Winnipeg Blue Bombers and signed with the team on May 18, 2016. He was the Blue Bombers' nominee for most outstanding rookie in 2016. He played NCAA football for the Boise State Broncos from 2011 to 2014, although due to injuries, he only dressed for games in the 2013 season. He then transferred to the University of British Columbia and played Canadian Interuniversity Sport (CIS) football with the UBC Thunderbirds in 2015. He announced his retirement from football on June 23, 2021.

== Statistics ==
		Defence
Year	Team	Games	Tackles	ST	Sacks	Int	TD	FF
2016	WPG	17	58	8	1	4	0	4
2017	WPG	17	75	3	0	1	0	3
2018	WPG	16	53	1	0	3	0	0
CFL totals		50	185	12	1	8	0	7
