= Chris Rainey =

American football player (born 1988)

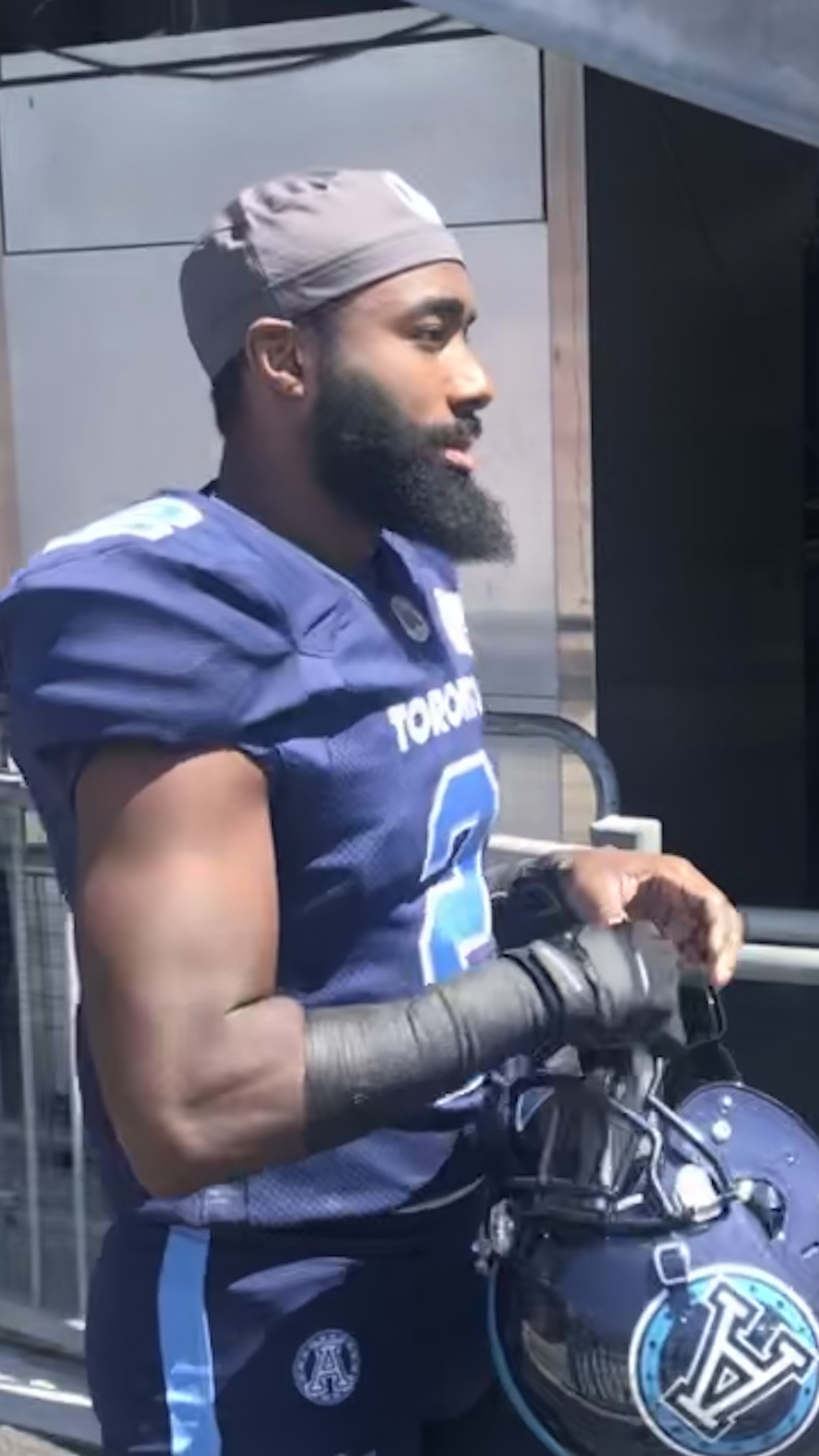
- Rainey with the Toronto Argonauts in 2019

No. 2, 3, 26, 22, 25
- Positions: Running back, kick returner

Personal information
- Born: March 2, 1988 (age 38); Lakeland, Florida, U.S.
- Listed height: 5 ft 8 in (1.73 m)
- Listed weight: 180 lb (82 kg)

Career information
- High school: Lakeland
- College: Florida

Career history
- 2012: Pittsburgh Steelers
- 2013: Indianapolis Colts
- 2014: Arizona Cardinals*
- 2014: Montreal Alouettes
- 2015–2018: BC Lions
- 2019: Toronto Argonauts
- 2020–2021: BC Lions
- * Offseason or practice squad member only

Awards and highlights
- CFL All-Star (2016); 2× CFL West All-Star (2016, 2018); BCS national champion (2009); NCAA 4x100 m relay championship (2010); First-team All-SEC (2011)

Career CFL statistics
- Rushing yards: 1,038
- Receiving yards: 1,293
- Return yards: 10,413
- Total touchdowns: 19
- Stats at Pro Football Reference
- Stats at CFL.ca

Christopher Rainey (born March 2, 1988) is an American former professional football player who was a running back and kick returner in the National Football League (NFL) and Canadian Football League (CFL). He played college football for the Florida Gators, and was a member of their BCS National Championship team in 2009. The Pittsburgh Steelers selected him in the fifth round of the 2012 NFL draft. He also played for the Indianapolis Colts of the NFL and the Montreal Alouettes, BC Lions and Toronto Argonauts of the CFL.

== Early life ==
Rainey was born in Lakeland, Florida, was raised by his grandmother. He attended Lakeland High School, where he became a standout running back for the Lakeland Dreadnaughts high school football team. During his high school years, he lived with the family of twin brothers Maurkice Pouncey and Mike Pouncey, and all three were standout members of the Dreadnaughts football team. As a senior in 2006, he led his team with 2,478 yards rushing for thirty-two touchdowns—including fifteen touchdown runs of fifty yards or more—and helped lead the Lakeland Dreadnaughts to their third consecutive Florida Class 5A state championship and second straight USA Today national championship. Following his senior season, he was a U.S. Army high school All-American and an all-state selection by the Florida Sports Writers Association, and finished his prep career with more than 7,000 all-purpose yards and ninety touchdowns.

Rainey and the Pouncey brothers all committed to play college football for the University of Florida. All three players would later be drafted by NFL teams.

== College career ==
Rainey accepted an athletic scholarship to attend the University of Florida in Gainesville, Florida, where he played for coach Urban Meyer and coach Will Muschamp's Gators teams from 2007 to 2011. After injuring his shoulder as a true freshman in 2007, he was redshirted. He was a member of the Gators' 2008 team that won the 2008 SEC Championship Game and the 2009 BCS National Championship Game. During his career as a Gator, he played in fifty-two games, compiled 2,464 yards and thirteen touchdowns on 396 rushing attempts, 795 yards and six touchdowns on sixty-nine receptions, and 454 return yards on eighteen kickoffs. On special teams, he holds the team career record for blocked kicks (4). Following his senior season in 2011, his fellow Gators recognized him as the team's most valuable player. He was suspended only four games in 2010 after he was charged with aggravated stalking for allegedly texting his girlfriend, "Time to die, b----."

As a freshman, he also ran the 100-meter dash for the Florida Gators track and field team, and received All-American honors as a member of the Gators men's third-place 4x100-meter relay team at the 2008 NCAA national outdoor track and field championships.

Rainey did not participate in track as a sophomore. As a junior in 2010, the Gators men's 4x100-meter relay team, including Rainey, Jeremy Hall, Terrell Wilks, and Jeff Demps, won the NCAA championship in the event with a winning time of 39.04 seconds. The quartet received All-American honors for their first-place finish.

Personal bests

| Event | Time (seconds) | Venue | Date |
|---|---|---|---|
| 60 meters | 6.70 | Blacksburg, Virginia | February 5, 2010 |
| 100 meters | 10.60 | Gainesville, Florida | April 16, 2011 |
| 200 meters | 21.50 | Winter Park, Florida | May 4, 2007 |

== Professional career ==
Pre-draft measurables
| Height | Weight | Arm length | Hand span | 40-yard dash | 10-yard split | 20-yard split | 20-yard shuttle | Three-cone drill | Vertical jump | Broad jump | Bench press |
|---|---|---|---|---|---|---|---|---|---|---|---|
| 5 ft 8 3/8 in (1.74 m) | 180 lb (82 kg) | 30 3/4 in (0.78 m) | 9 1/2 in (0.24 m) | 4.23 s | 1.50 s | 2.58 s | 3.93 s | 6.50 s | 36.5 in (0.93 m) | 10 ft 0 in (3.05 m) | 16 reps |
All values from NFL Combine, except 40 time from Central Florida Pro Day

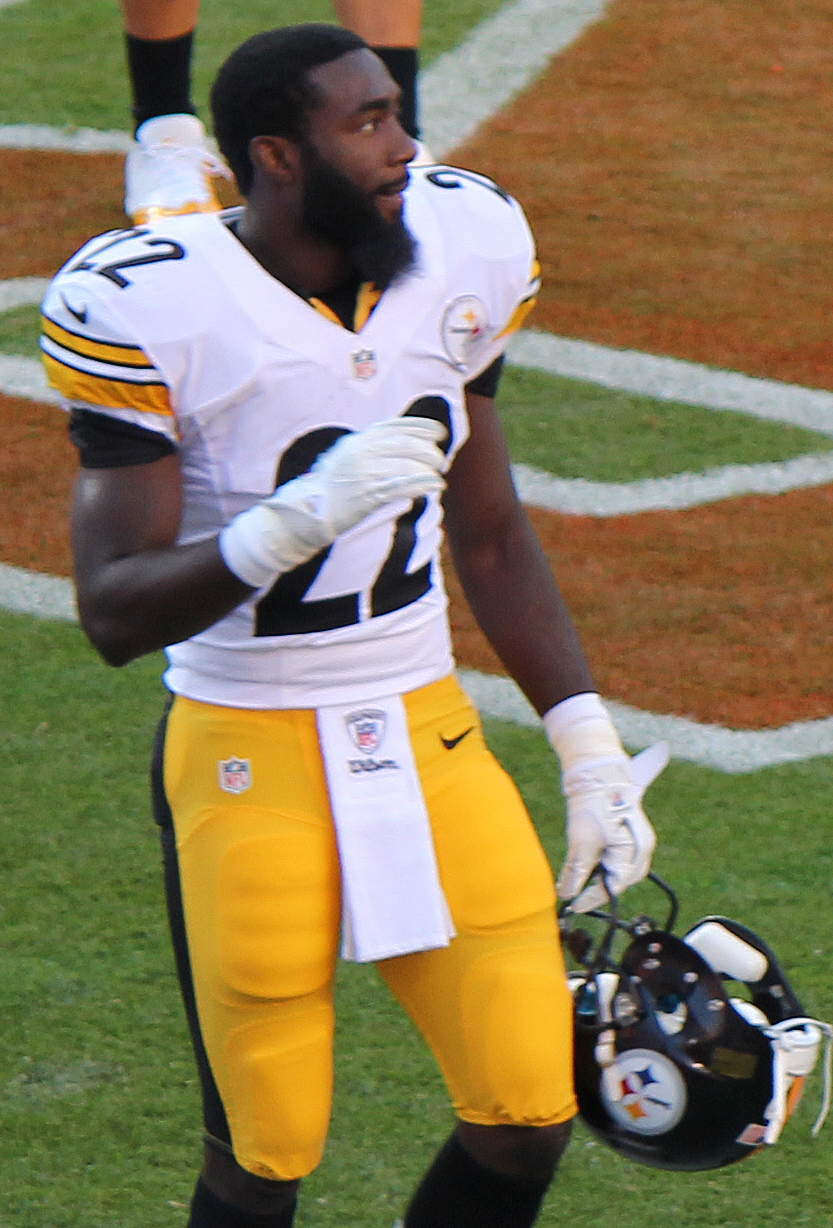
Rainey with the Pittsburgh Steelers.

=== Pittsburgh Steelers ===
The Pittsburgh Steelers selected Rainey in the fifth round, 159th overall pick, of the 2012 NFL draft. The team announced he had signed a four-year contract on May 6, 2012. He debuted for the Steelers against the Denver Broncos on September 9, 2012 and scored his first NFL touchdown against the Cincinnati Bengals on October 21, 2012.

The Steelers waived Rainey on January 10, 2013, after he was arrested on a battery charge for attacking a young woman in a cellphone dispute.

=== Indianapolis Colts ===
Rainey signed with the Indianapolis Colts on November 20, 2013. He spent three weeks with Indianapolis. His first week, given limited practice time with the team, he was inactive. Rainey would, however, appear in the next two contests for the Colts; Weeks 13 & 14. Immediately following their Week 14 match-up, a losing effort to the Cincinnati Bengals, Indianapolis announced Monday December 9, that Rainey had been placed on season-ending Injured Reserve. In his two games with the Colts Rainey returned six kickoffs and four punts for a total of 160 all-purpose yards. Despite being used in a few third-down packages, Rainey failed to make any offensive contributions in his very limited time with Indianapolis. On July 28, 2014 Colts coach Chuck Pagano announced Chris Rainey had been released from the team citing, "It's unfortunate and [a] violation of team rules. It was an in-house deal, that's all I'm going to say about that."

=== Arizona Cardinals ===
Rainey signed with the Arizona Cardinals practice squad on September 9, 2014. He was released by the team on September 18, 2014.

=== Montreal Alouettes ===
Rainey signed with the Montreal Alouettes practice roster on September 28, 2014. He was promoted to the active roster on October 20, 2014. Rainey played in 5 games for the Alouettes during the 2014 season, receiving 22 touches on offense and 15 as a return specialist. Rainey was cut by the team on June 15, 2015.

=== BC Lions (first stint) ===
Rainey signed with the BC Lions on August 28, 2015. After signing midway through the season, Rainey played in the final nine games of the regular season, primarily on punt and kick return. In the 2016 season Rainey led the CFL in combined yards with 2,945 last year, and finished third in both kick and punt return yards with 1,359 and 942 respectively. On December 5, 2016, Rainey and the Lions agreed to a two-year contract extension, keeping him with the club through the 2018 CFL season.

=== Toronto Argonauts ===
Upon entering free agency, Rainey signed with the Toronto Argonauts on February 12, 2019. In week 4 against his former team, the BC Lions, Rainey returned a punt for a touchdown, but stepped out of bounds as time expired following a missed field goal, awarding BC a rouge, breaking a tie game and awarding BC the win. Rainey passed 10,000 career return yards during the season, and was named Toronto's Most Outstanding Special Teams Player. Rainey was appreciative of the nomination, but stated that teammate Frank Beltre who led the league in special teams tackles was more deserving. As a pending free agent in 2020, he was released during the free agency negotiation window on February 7, 2020.

=== BC Lions (second stint) ===
On February 11, 2020, it was announced that Rainey had signed a one-year contract to return to the Lions. However, the 2020 CFL season was cancelled, so Rainey signed again with the Lions on February 9, 2021. Rainey was not offered a contract by the Lions and became a free agent on February 8, 2022.

== Personal life ==
Chris and his wife, Jenn, have three children Makari, Makynli, and Makailynn.

Rainey's older brother is former CFL, XFL and NFL running back and kick returner “He Hate Me” Rod Smart.

== See also ==
- 2008 Florida Gators football team
- List of Florida Gators in the NFL draft
- List of Pittsburgh Steelers players
