= Travis Bond =

American football player (born 1990)

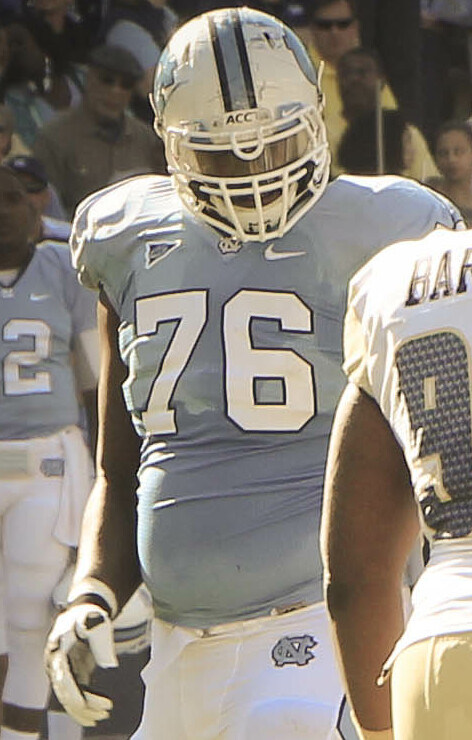
- Bond with the North Carolina Tar Heels in 2012

No. 74
- Position: Offensive lineman

Personal information
- Born: December 10, 1990 (age 35); Powellsville, North Carolina, U.S.
- Listed height: 6 ft 6 in (1.98 m)
- Listed weight: 329 lb (149 kg)

Career information
- High school: Bertie (Windsor, North Carolina)
- College: North Carolina (2009–2012)
- NFL draft: 2013: 7th round, 214th overall pick

Career history
- Minnesota Vikings (2013)*; Carolina Panthers (2013); St. Louis Rams (2014–2015)*; Los Angeles KISS (2016); Winnipeg Blue Bombers (2016–2017); Saskatchewan Roughriders (2018)*; Edmonton Eskimos (2018–2019)
- * Offseason or practice squad member only

Awards and highlights
- CFL All-Star (2016); CFL West All-Star (2016)

Career NFL statistics
- Games played: 2
- Stats at Pro Football Reference
- Stats at CFL.ca

Travis Bond (born December 10, 1990) is an American former professional football player who was an offensive lineman in the National Football League (NFL) and Canadian Football League (CFL). He played college football for the North Carolina Tar Heels. He was selected by the Minnesota Vikings in the 2013 NFL draft. He was also a member of the Carolina Panthers, St. Louis Rams, Los Angeles KISS, Winnipeg Blue Bombers, Saskatchewan Roughriders and Edmonton Eskimos. Bond is notable for his size, having been nicknamed "Treetop" as a child.

== Professional career ==
Pre-draft measurables
Height	Weight	Arm length	Hand span	40-yard dash	20-yard shuttle	Three-cone drill	Vertical jump	Broad jump	Bench press
6 ft 6 in (1.98 m)	329 lb (149 kg)	35 1/2 in (0.90 m)	9 5/8 in (0.24 m)	5.27 s	4.96 s	7.85 s	22.5 in (0.57 m)	8 ft 9 in (2.67 m)	22 reps
All values from NFL Combine

=== Minnesota Vikings ===
Prior to being drafted, Bond was victim of a hit and run when he was run over by a truck driving between 10 and 20 mph. The truck was dented in two spots, but Bond walked away without any obvious injuries; it was several weeks later when Bond was lifting weights that he felt discomfort in his wrist from the incident. On April 27, 2013, he was selected by the Minnesota Vikings in the seventh round, 214 overall pick of the 2013 NFL draft. Bond was released by the Vikings on August 31, 2013 (along with 18 others) to get to a 53-man roster and signed to the practice squad the next day.

=== Carolina Panthers ===
The Carolina Panthers signed Bond off the Vikings practice squad on November 13, 2013. He played in two games for the Panthers in 2013. He was waived from Carolina on May 19, 2014.

=== St. Louis Rams ===
The St. Louis Rams acquired Bond off waivers on May 20, 2014. He was waived during final cuts on August 29, 2014.

=== Los Angeles KISS ===
On November 16, 2015, Bond was assigned to the Los Angeles KISS of the Arena Football League (during the off-season).

=== Winnipeg Blue Bombers ===
On March 8, 2016, Bond signed a contract with the Winnipeg Blue Bombers of the Canadian Football League. He played in 12 games for the team in 2016 and was named to the league All-Star team. Bond played in 16 games with the Blue Bombers in 2017, and became a free agent the following year.

=== Saskatchewan Roughriders ===
Bond initially signed with Winnipeg's hated rivals, the Saskatchewan Roughriders for 2018. Despite receiving a notable signing bonus, Bond was released after the preseason.

=== Edmonton Eskimos ===
He then signed with the Edmonton Eskimos, where he played 17 games in 2018. Bond signed an extension with Edmonton for 2019, where he played in 13 games and recorded his first career special teams tackle.
