= 2018 CFL season =

Canadian Football League season

- Duration: June 14 – November 3, 2018
- East champions: Ottawa Redblacks
- West champions: Calgary Stampeders

106th Grey Cup
- Date: November 25, 2018
- Venue: The Brick Field at Commonwealth Stadium, Edmonton
- Champions: Calgary Stampeders

CFL seasons
- ← 2017 2019 →

Locations of the active CFL teams West East

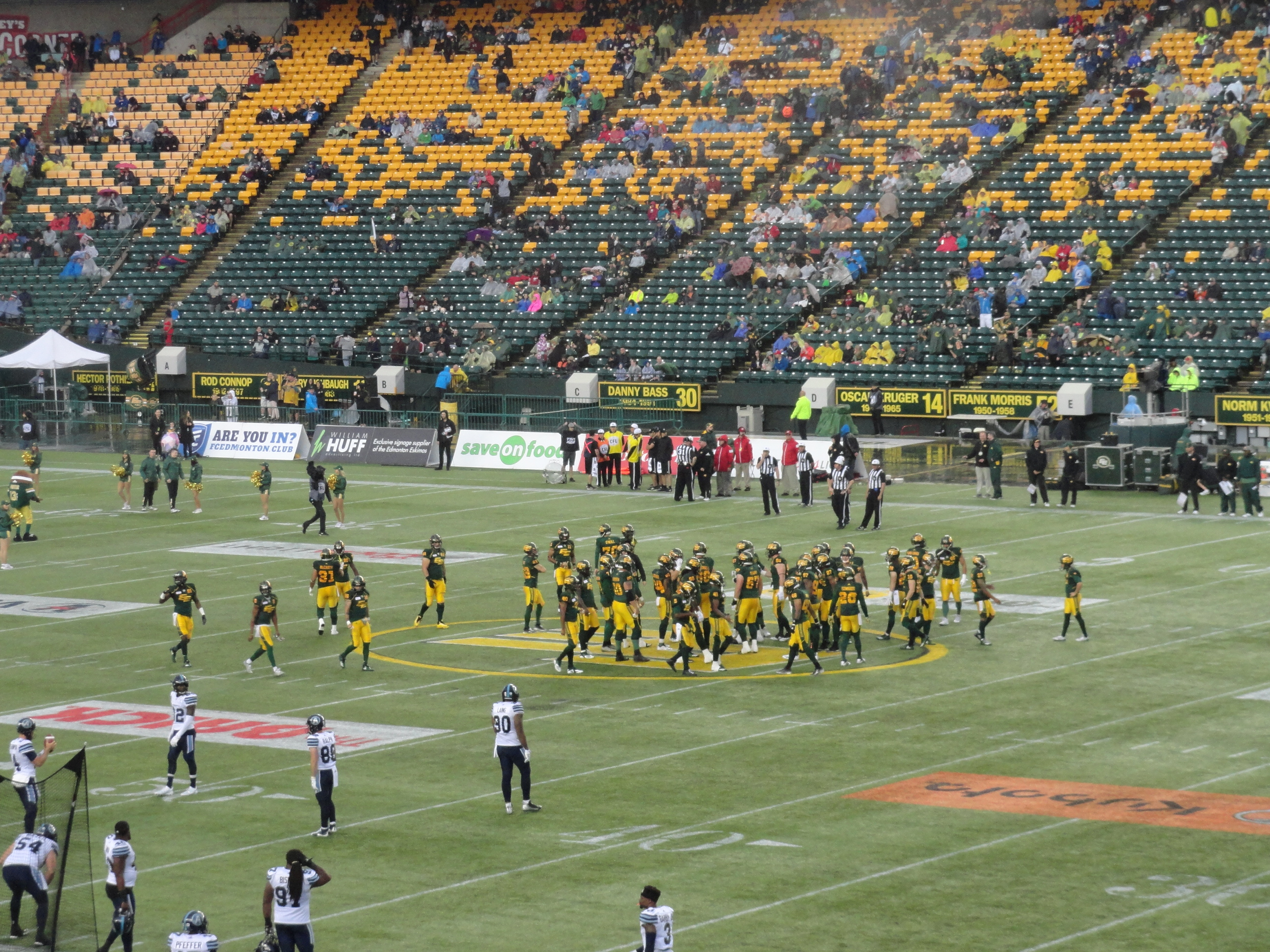
Toronto Argonauts at Edmonton Eskimos regular season game

The 2018 CFL season was the 65th season of modern-day Canadian football. Officially, it was the 61st Canadian Football League season. Edmonton hosted the 106th Grey Cup on November 25, 2018. The CFL announced that this season will move to a 21-week regular season (previously a 20-week season) to increase player rest time and reduce short turnaround-times for games. Given the change, the regular season began on June 14, 2018, one week earlier than usual, and concluded on November 3, 2018.

== CFL news in 2018 ==
=== Salary cap ===
According to the new collective bargaining agreement, the 2018 salary cap will be set at $5,200,000 (average of $113,043 per active roster spot). As per the agreement, the cap is fixed and will not vary with league revenue performance. The minimum player salary is $54,000. This will be the last season under the current CBA with this deal expiring May 15, 2019, or the first day of the 2019 training camp, whichever comes first.

=== Free agency ===
The 2018 free agency period began on Tuesday, February 13, 2018, at 12pm EST. All players eligible for free agency are unrestricted free agents, as is customary in the league.

=== New ball ===
On March 19, 2018, the CFL announced that it would introduce a new football for the 2018 season. The new ball, produced by Wilson Sporting Goods, matches the specifications of the ball used in the National Football League and uses the "slightly harder" Horween leather used in that league, but with the CFL's laces and its characteristic white striping.

=== CFL Week ===
Following the success of the week-long league and prospect showcase in March 2017, the league announced on September 9, 2017, that Mark's CFL Week would return and would be hosted by Winnipeg. The event took place from Thursday March 22 to Sunday March 25, 2018, and was highlighted by the CFL National Combine: In which, 52 2018 CFL draft eligible prospects competed. The festivities were held at the RBC Convention Centre in Winnipeg. Similar to last year's installment, over 50 current players attended for fan engagement and media photo shoots. The 2018 Canadian Football Hall of Fame inductees (Scott Flory, Barron Miles, Tommy Hugo, Hank Ilesic, Brent Johnson, Frank Cosentino, and Paul Brule) were announced during a gala and the CFL Rules and Competition Committee meetings were held.

=== Schedule ===
On September 13, 2017, the league announced that the 2018 season would have a 21-week regular season schedule rather than the 20-week schedule used from 2004 to 2005 and 2014 to 2017 when the league had nine teams. This will be the longest, in terms of calendar days, that a CFL season has been. In this model, there will be 18 four-game weeks and three three-game weeks. Every team will have three bye weeks, up from the previous eight teams with two bye weeks and one team with three (while playing two games in one week). This change was also a probable result of the backlash received for the 2017 Ottawa Redblacks season schedule that saw the team play 17 games over the first 17 weeks and have their byes in weeks 18 and 20. Ottawa also had to play three games in 11 days as did the Toronto Argonauts, due to the five-game week in week 5.

On December 14, 2017, the CFL released the 2018 season schedule, which was almost two months earlier than in years past. The season opening game was hosted on June 14 by the Winnipeg Blue Bombers, the first time they have hosted that game since the 2014 season. The Grey Cup rematch, hosted by the Argonauts, took place in week 2, which was the first time since 2013 that it was not featured in week 1. Three-game weeks will take place in weeks 5, 9, and 14 as three teams will have byes during those weeks.

There are four triple headers, all occurring on Saturdays and after the Labour Day Classic games, presumably to avoid playing games on Sundays and interfering with TSN's broadcast of National Football League games. There are also 11 double headers this year, with one on a Thursday, three on Fridays, five on Saturdays, and two on Mondays (the traditional Labour Day and Thanksgiving contests). Other than the two Holiday Monday games, all games this season are played between Thursday and Sunday. This will be the fourth straight season to showcase Thursday Night Football with 10 of the first 11 weeks featuring Thursday night games, with every team hosting at least once. For the first time since 2014, there are not only all intra-divisional games in the last week of the regular season, but those games are also featured in the last three weeks of the regular season (which also occurred in 2014). There are nine home-and-home series, with the Argonauts playing the most, with four. The Hamilton Tiger-Cats have a delayed home-and-home series with the Saskatchewan Roughriders as both teams have a bye during week 5 (in which case, the Tiger-Cats also have four such series).

=== Front office changes ===
Team	2017 GM	2018 GM	Notes
BC Lions	Wally Buono	Ed Hervey	On November 30, 2017, the BC Lions announced that Wally Buono would step aside from his duties as general manager to be replaced by Ed Hervey. Hervey had been the general manager of the Edmonton Eskimos from 2013 though 2016, winning the 103rd Grey Cup in 2015. Buono will remain as the Lions' head coach.

=== Coaching changes ===
Team	2017 HC	2017 interim HC	2018 HC	Notes
Hamilton Tiger-Cats	Kent Austin	June Jones		On December 4, 2017, the Tiger-Cats announced that they would be bringing back 2017 interim head coach June Jones on a permanent basis. Junes took over from Kent Austin after the Ti-Cats started the 2017 season 0–8, and under Jones' leadership the team won six of their remaining 10 games.
Montreal Alouettes	Jacques Chapdelaine	Kavis Reed	Mike Sherman	Kavis Reed, the interim head coach for Montreal, explicitly refused to accept any permanent appointment to the position (he lost all seven games as Alouettes head coach) but will remain on staff as general manager. Reed conducted the search for the team's new head coach following the 2017 season. On December 20, 2017, the Montreal Alouettes announced that they would be hiring former Green Bay Packers head coach Mike Sherman as the club's 23rd head coach.

=== Negotiation lists ===
In late January 2018 CFL commissioner Randy Ambrosie announced that teams would be required to make public the names of 10 of the 45 players on their negotiation lists twice per year: once in February and once in December. The negotiation list is the process by which non-Canadian players enter the CFL; in lieu of a draft, teams instead unilaterally claim rights to any non-Canadian player by placing them on the list at any time on a first come, first served basis. The decision to go public was supported by the league's presidents, governors and general managers. On February 20, 2018, all nine CFL teams announced 10 players on their negotiation list.

=== NFL window ===
On July 20, 2018, the nine CFL owners voted to reinstate the "NFL window". All players who sign contracts after August 20, 2018, will be eligible to work out (attend try-outs and mini-camps) and sign contracts with NFL teams during the off-season. CFL rookies will still be required to sign two year contracts, but now have the opportunity to have their contract terminated if signed by an NFL team after their first year.

=== Quarterback safety ===
In the middle of the CFL playoffs the CFL announced that they would be adding an eighth official to the final three playoff games with the sole purpose of identifying and penalizing any instances of violent impacts to the neck or head of a quarterback. The change came about as a result of injuries to Zach Collaros and Brandon Bridge who both received violent hits to the head.

=== Rules changes ===
In March the CFL's Rules Committee submitted a variety of rule changes to the Board of Governors, to be implemented for the 2017 season. As was the case in 2017, the proposed changes once again focused on improving game flow and increasing player safety. The proposals were reviewed and accepted by the CFL's Board of Governors on May 23, 2018.

==== Accepted ====
- Coaches are no longer able to challenge 'illegal contact on a receiver' penalties
- Replay official will automatically review "potential touchdowns", where the ball was stopped just short of the end-zone
  - Replay official will also be able to change the time of the in-game clock during a challenge
- Penalizing 'blindside blocks' in which any player running backwards to their own goal-line delivers a forcible block on an opponent. The goal of this rule change is to reduce injuries, specifically head trauma
- Ban 'low blocks' outside the tackle box to reduce leg injures
- Expanded definition of 'spearing' to include situations where the tackling player delivers a hit with the helmet as the initial or primary point of contact. This rule would not apply to "a low running ball carrier"
- Removing a loophole in the 'sleeper play' rules in which players who enter the game could have stayed 'outside the numbers' and received the ball. If passed, all new players to join an offensive or special teams play will have to go in 'between the numbers' if they are to touch the ball (i.e. go into the huddle, or near the middle of the field)
- Simplification of what constitutes a legal pass from behind the line of scrimmage. Currently the requirement is for the ball to be behind the line of scrimmage at the time the passing player releases the pass. The proposed rule would instead require one, or either, of the passer's feet to be on, or behind, the line of scrimmage.
- Elimination of the 'force out' catch rule. All receivers will now have to get one foot in-bounds regardless of whether or not they are contacted by a defender while leaping/diving.
- Increase the penalty for 'pyramiding' (climbing or vaulting off the body of another player to attempt to block a kick) from 5 yards to 10 yards

== Broadcasting ==
Broadcast agreements with the ESPN family of networks, including TSN in Canada, continue. In the United States, games not carried on ESPN's linear networks will now be placed behind a hard paywall for all viewers as ESPN+ takes over streaming those games; they had previously been carried on ESPN3, the cost of which had been bundled into the price set by the Internet service provider.

Although the CFL's agreement with TSN has since been extended to 2021, that extension did not cover U.S. rights, which expire after 2018. The CFL has admitted courting a return to NFL Network, which carried the league's games in 2010 and 2011; such a move would require the league to move its schedule a month earlier than it starts now, potentially overlapping with the Stanley Cup Finals.

The league continued to make games available to fans outside of major broadcast areas via its CFL International Service. In partnership with Yare Media, all games were made available over the internet to over 100 countries.

== Regular season ==
=== Structure ===
Teams play eighteen regular season games, playing two divisional opponents three times and all of the other teams twice. Teams were awarded two points for a win and one point for a tie. The top three teams in each division qualified for the playoffs, with the first place team gaining a bye to the divisional finals. A fourth place team in one division may qualify ahead of the third place team in the other division (the "Crossover"), if they earn more points in the season. If a third-place team finishes in a tie with the fourth place team in the other division, the third place team automatically gets the playoff spot and there is no crossover.

If two or more teams in the same division were equal in points, the following tiebreakers applied:

1. Most wins in all games
2. Head to head winning percentage (matches won divided by all matches played)
3. Head to head points difference
4. Head to head points ratio
5. Tiebreakers 3–5 applied sequentially to all divisional games
6. Tiebreakers 4 and 5 applied sequentially to all league games
7. Coin toss

Notes:

- 1. If two clubs remain tied after other club(s) are eliminated during any step, tie breakers reverts to step 2.

=== Standings ===
Note: GP = Games Played, W = Wins, L = Losses, T = Ties, PF = Points For, PA = Points Against, Pts = Points

Teams in bold are in playoff positions.

West Division
Team	GP	W	L	T	Pts	PF	PA	Div	Stk	
**Calgary Stampeders**	18	13	5	0	26	522	363	5–5	W1	Details
**Saskatchewan Roughriders**	18	12	6	0	24	450	444	7–3	W2	Details
**Winnipeg Blue Bombers**	18	10	8	0	20	550	419	4–6	L1	Details
**BC Lions**	18	9	9	0	18	423	473	4–6	L2	Details
Edmonton Eskimos	18	9	9	0	18	482	471	5–5	W1	Details

East Division
Team	GP	W	L	T	Pts	PF	PA	Div	Stk	
**Ottawa Redblacks**	18	11	7	0	22	464	420	6–2	W3	Details
**Hamilton Tiger-Cats**	18	8	10	0	16	513	456	4–4	L3	Details
Montreal Alouettes	18	5	13	0	10	345	512	4–4	W2	Details
Toronto Argonauts	18	4	14	0	8	369	560	2–6	L2	Details

==== Tie-breaker notes ====
- BC and Edmonton finished fourth and fifth respectively in the West because BC won the season series over Edmonton.

=== Results ===
Abbreviation and Colour Key: BC – BC Lions • CGY – Calgary Stampeders • EDM – Edmonton Eskimos • HAM – Hamilton Tiger-Cats • MTL – Montreal Alouettes OTT – Ottawa Redblacks • SSK – Saskatchewan Roughriders • TOR – Toronto Argonauts • WPG – Winnipeg Blue Bombers Home • Away • Win • Loss • Tie
Team	Week																				
Team	1	2	3	4	5	6	7	8	9	10	11	12	13	14	15	16	17	18	19	20	21
BC Lions	MTL	Bye	EDM	WPG	WPG	OTT	Bye	CGY	EDM	TOR	SSK	Bye	OTT	MTL	HAM	HAM	TOR	CGY	EDM	SSK	CGY
BC Lions	22–10	Bye	22–41	19–41	20–17	25–29	Bye	18–27	31–23	23–24	21–24	Bye	26–14	32–14	35–32	10–40	26–23	26–21	42–32	16–35	9–26
Calgary Stampeders	HAM	TOR	OTT	Bye	OTT	MTL	SSK	BC	Bye	SSK	WPG	EDM	EDM	HAM	Bye	TOR	MTL	BC	SSK	WPG	BC
Calgary Stampeders	28–14	41–7	24–14	Bye	27–3	25–8	34–22	27–18	Bye	27–40	39–26	23–20	42–48	43–28	Bye	38–16	12–6	21–26	24–29	21–29	26–9
Edmonton Eskimos	WPG	HAM	BC	TOR	TOR	Bye	MTL	SSK	BC	MTL	HAM	CGY	CGY	Bye	OTT	WPG	SSK	OTT	BC	Bye	WPG
Edmonton Eskimos	33–30	21–38	41–22	17–20	16–15	Bye	44–23	26–19	23–31	40–24	24–25	20–23	48–42	Bye	15–28	3–30	12–19	34–16	32–42	Bye	33–24
Hamilton Tiger-Cats	CGY	EDM	WPG	SSK	Bye	SSK	OTT	MTL	WPG	Bye	EDM	TOR	TOR	CGY	BC	BC	Bye	TOR	OTT	OTT	MTL
Hamilton Tiger-Cats	14–28	38–21	31–17	13–18	Bye	20–31	15–21	50–11	23–29	Bye	25–24	42–28	36–25	28–43	32–35	40–10	Bye	34–20	31–35	13–30	28–30
Montreal Alouettes	BC	WPG	SSK	OTT	Bye	CGY	EDM	HAM	OTT	EDM	TOR	OTT	Bye	BC	WPG	SSK	CGY	Bye	TOR	TOR	HAM
Montreal Alouettes	10–22	10–56	23–17	18–28	Bye	8–28	23–44	11–50	17–24	24–40	25–22	21–11	Bye	14–32	14–31	29–34	6–12	Bye	22–26	40–10	30–28
Ottawa Redblacks	Bye	SSK	CGY	MTL	CGY	BC	HAM	TOR	MTL	WPG	Bye	MTL	BC	SSK	EDM	Bye	WPG	EDM	HAM	HAM	TOR
Ottawa Redblacks	Bye	40–17	14–24	28–18	3–27	29–25	21–15	41–42	24–17	44–21	Bye	11–21	14–26	30–25	28–15	Bye	32–40	16–34	35–31	30–13	24–9
Saskatchewan Roughriders	TOR	OTT	MTL	HAM	Bye	HAM	CGY	EDM	Bye	CGY	BC	WPG	WPG	OTT	TOR	MTL	EDM	WPG	CGY	BC	Bye
Saskatchewan Roughriders	27–19	17–40	17–23	18–13	Bye	31–20	22–34	19–26	Bye	40–27	24–21	31–23	32–27	25–30	30–29	34–29	19–12	0–31	29–24	35-16	Bye
Toronto Argonauts	SSK	CGY	Bye	EDM	EDM	WPG	WPG	OTT	Bye	BC	MTL	HAM	HAM	Bye	SSK	CGY	BC	HAM	MTL	MTL	OTT
Toronto Argonauts	19–27	7–41	Bye	20–17	15–16	20–38	14–40	42–41	Bye	24–23	22–25	28–42	25–36	Bye	29–30	16–38	23–26	20–34	26–22	10–40	9–24
Winnipeg Blue Bombers	EDM	MTL	HAM	BC	BC	TOR	TOR	Bye	HAM	OTT	CGY	SSK	SSK	Bye	MTL	EDM	OTT	SSK	Bye	CGY	EDM
Winnipeg Blue Bombers	30–33	56–10	17–31	41–19	17–20	38–20	40–14	Bye	29–23	21–44	26–39	23–31	27–32	Bye	31–14	30–3	40–32	31–0	Bye	29–21	24–33

== CFL Playoffs ==
The Grey Cup was played at The Brick Field at Commonwealth Stadium on November 25, 2018. Stampeders' QB, Bo Levi Mitchell was named Grey Cup MVP and Stampeders' wide receiver, Lemar Durant was named the Grey Cup's Most Valuable Canadian.

=== Playoff bracket ===
November 11: Division Semi-Finals
East
E2	Hamilton Tiger-Cats	48
W4	BC Lions	8
West
W2	Saskatchewan Roughriders	18
W3	Winnipeg Blue Bombers	23

November 18: Division Finals
E1	Ottawa Redblacks	46
E2	Hamilton Tiger-Cats	27
W1	Calgary Stampeders	22
W3	Winnipeg Blue Bombers	14

November 25: 106th Grey Cup; The Brick Field at Commonwealth Stadium – Edmonton
E1	Ottawa Redblacks	16
W1	Calgary Stampeders	27

== Award winners ==
=== CFL Top Performers of the Week ===
Week	First	Second	Third	Fans' Choice
1	Charleston Hughes	Mike Reilly	Derel Walker	Charleston Hughes
2	Bo Levi Mitchell	Chris Streveler	Jeremiah Masoli	Chris Streveler
3	C. J. Gable	Jeremiah Masoli	Boris Bede	Jeremiah Masoli
4	Adam Bighill	Brad Sinopoli	James Wilder Jr.	Adam Bighill
5	D'haquille Williams	Travis Lulay	Micah Johnson	Micah Johnson
6	Andrew Harris	Brad Sinopoli	Trevor Harris	Andrew Harris
7	Mike Reilly	Lewis Ward	Jovan Santos-Knox	Jovan Santos-Knox
8	McLeod Bethel-Thompson	Kamar Jorden	S. J. Green	McLeod Bethel-Thompson
9	Trevor Harris	Adam Bighill	Chris Rainey	Adam Bighill
10	Mike Reilly	Nick Marshall	Jordan Williams-Lambert	Jordan Williams-Lambert
11	Bo Levi Mitchell	Kamar Jorden	Ja'Gared Davis	Bo Levi Mitchell
12	Brandon Banks	Jeremiah Masoli	Luke Tasker	Brandon Banks
13	Mike Reilly	D’haquille Williams	Brandon Banks	Brandon Banks
14	William Powell	Anthony Orange	Reggie Begelton	Reggie Begelton
15	Lewis Ward	Jonathon Jennings	Bryan Burnham	Lewis Ward
16	Zach Collaros	Kevin Fogg	Don Unamba	Kevin Fogg
17	Willie Jefferson	Davon Coleman	Andrew Harris	Andrew Harris
18	Adam Bighill	Bryant Mitchell	Mike Reilly	Adam Bighill
19	DeVier Posey	Zach Collaros	Trevor Harris	Zach Collaros
20	Matt Nichols	Diontae Spencer	John Bowman	Matt Nichols
21	Mike Reilly	C. J. Gable	William Stanback	

=== CFL Top Performers of the Month ===
Month	First	Second	Third
June	Mike Reilly	Jeremiah Masoli	D'haquille Williams
July	Andrew Harris	D'haquille Williams	Brad Sinopoli
August	Kamar Jorden	Charleston Hughes	Mike Reilly
September	Jeremiah Masoli	William Powell	Lewis Ward
October	Matt Nichols	Adam Bighill	Trevor Harris

=== Attendance ===
2018 CFL Attendance
Team	Home Avg.	% of Capacity	League Avg. Diff.
BC	19,975.1	72.64%	-3,880.7
Calgary	26,339.6	73.88%	+2,483.8
Edmonton	31,107.3	55.93%	+7,251.6
Hamilton	23,523.4	97.80%	-332.3
Montreal	17,332.1	73.97%	-6,523.7
Ottawa	23,276.1	94.40%	-579.7
Saskatchewan	32,057.3	96.12%	+8,201.6
Toronto	14,210.7	52.63%	-9,645.1
Winnipeg	26,880.3	81.40%	+3,024.6
League average	23,855.8	75.46%	N/A

== 2018 CFL All-Stars ==
=== Offence ===
- QB – Bo Levi Mitchell, Calgary Stampeders
- RB – Andrew Harris, Winnipeg Blue Bombers
- R – D'haquille Williams, Edmonton Eskimos
- R – Brandon Banks, Hamilton Tiger-Cats
- R – Brad Sinopoli, Ottawa Redblacks
- R – Luke Tasker, Hamilton Tiger-Cats
- R – Bryan Burnham, BC Lions
- OT – Stanley Bryant, Winnipeg Blue Bombers
- OT – SirVincent Rogers, Ottawa Redblacks
- OG – Brandon Revenberg, Hamilton Tiger-Cats
- OG – Brendon LaBatte, Saskatchewan Roughriders
- C – Matthias Goossen, Winnipeg Blue Bombers

=== Defence ===
- DT – Micah Johnson, Calgary Stampeders
- DT – Davon Coleman, BC Lions
- DE – Willie Jefferson, Saskatchewan Roughriders
- DE – Charleston Hughes, Saskatchewan Roughriders
- LB – Adam Bighill, Winnipeg Blue Bombers
- LB – Alex Singleton, Calgary Stampeders
- CLB – Don Unamba, Hamilton Tiger-Cats
- CB – Delvin Breaux, Hamilton Tiger-Cats
- CB – Anthony Orange, BC Lions
- HB – Ed Gainey, Saskatchewan Roughriders
- HB – T. J. Lee, BC Lions
- S – Taylor Loffler, Winnipeg Blue Bombers

=== Special teams ===
- K – Lewis Ward, Ottawa Redblacks
- P – Ty Long, BC Lions
- ST – Diontae Spencer, Ottawa Redblacks

== 2018 CFL Western All-Stars ==
=== Offence ===
- QB – Bo Levi Mitchell, Calgary Stampeders
- RB – Andrew Harris, Winnipeg Blue Bombers
- R – Darvin Adams, Winnipeg Blue Bombers
- R – Bryan Burnham, BC Lions
- R – D'haquille Williams, Edmonton Eskimos
- R – Kamar Jorden, Calgary Stampeders
- R – Derel Walker, Edmonton Eskimos
- OT – Stanley Bryant, Winnipeg Blue Bombers
- OT – Derek Dennis, Calgary Stampeders
- OG – Brendon LaBatte, Saskatchewan Roughriders
- OG – Sukh Chungh, Winnipeg Blue Bombers
- C – Matthias Goossen, Winnipeg Blue Bombers

=== Defence ===
- DT – Micah Johnson, Calgary Stampeders
- DT – Davon Coleman, BC Lions
- DE – Willie Jefferson, Saskatchewan Roughriders
- DE – Charleston Hughes, Saskatchewan Roughriders
- LB – Adam Bighill, Winnipeg Blue Bombers
- LB – Alex Singleton, Calgary Stampeders
- CLB – Otha Foster, BC Lions
- CB – Anthony Orange, BC Lions
- CB – Ciante Evans, Calgary Stampeders
- HB – Ed Gainey, Saskatchewan Roughriders
- HB – T. J. Lee, BC Lions
- S – Taylor Loffler, Winnipeg Blue Bombers

=== Special teams ===
- K – Brett Lauther, Saskatchewan Roughriders
- P – Ty Long, BC Lions
- ST – Chris Rainey, BC Lions

== 2018 CFL Eastern All-Stars ==
=== Offence ===
- QB – Jeremiah Masoli, Hamilton Tiger-Cats
- RB – William Powell, Ottawa Redblacks
- R – Brandon Banks, Hamilton Tiger-Cats
- R – Brad Sinopoli, Ottawa Redblacks
- R – Greg Ellingson, Ottawa Redblacks
- R – Luke Tasker, Hamilton Tiger-Cats
- R – S. J. Green, Toronto Argonauts
- OT – SirVincent Rogers, Ottawa Redblacks
- OT – Chris Van Zeyl, Toronto Argonauts
- OG – Brandon Revenberg, Hamilton Tiger-Cats
- OG – Ryan Bomben, Toronto Argonauts
- C – Alex Mateas, Ottawa Redblacks

=== Defence ===
- DT – Ted Laurent, Hamilton Tiger-Cats
- DT – Cleyon Laing, Toronto Argonauts
- DE – A.C. Leonard, Ottawa Redblacks
- DE – John Bowman, Montreal Alouettes
- LB – Larry Dean, Hamilton Tiger-Cats
- LB – Hénoc Muamba, Montreal Alouettes
- CLB – Don Unamba, Hamilton Tiger-Cats
- CB – Delvin Breaux, Hamilton Tiger-Cats
- CB – Jonathan Rose, Ottawa Redblacks
- HB – Rico Murray, Ottawa Redblacks
- HB – Cariel Brooks, Hamilton Tiger-Cats
- S – Branden Dozier, Montreal Alouettes

=== Special teams ===
- K – Lewis Ward, Ottawa Redblacks
- P – Richie Leone, Ottawa Redblacks
- ST – Diontae Spencer, Ottawa Redblacks

== 2018 CFL awards ==
- CFL's Most Outstanding Player Award – Bo Levi Mitchell (QB), Calgary Stampeders
- CFL's Most Outstanding Canadian Award – Brad Sinopoli (WR), Ottawa Redblacks
- CFL's Most Outstanding Defensive Player Award – Adam Bighill (LB), Winnipeg Blue Bombers
- CFL's Most Outstanding Offensive Lineman Award – Stanley Bryant, (OT), Winnipeg Blue Bombers
- CFL's Most Outstanding Rookie Award – Lewis Ward (K), Ottawa Redblacks
- John Agro Special Teams Award – Lewis Ward (K), Ottawa Redblacks
- Tom Pate Memorial Award – Ryan King (LS), Edmonton Eskimos
- Jake Gaudaur Veterans' Trophy – Rolly Lumbala (FB), BC Lions
- Annis Stukus Trophy – Chris Jones, Saskatchewan Roughriders
- Commissioner's Award – Pierre Vercheval
- Hugh Campbell Distinguished Leadership Award – Wally Buono
