= 2016 CFL season =

Canadian Football League season

- Duration: June 23 – November 5, 2016
- East champions: Ottawa Redblacks
- West champions: Calgary Stampeders

104th Grey Cup
- Date: November 27, 2016
- Venue: BMO Field, Toronto
- Champions: Ottawa Redblacks

CFL seasons
- ← 2015 2017 →

Locations of the active CFL teams West East

The 2016 CFL season was the 63rd season of modern-day Canadian football. Officially, it was the 59th Canadian Football League season. Toronto hosted the 104th Grey Cup on November 27. The regular season began on June 23 and ended on November 5.

== CFL news in 2016 ==
=== Salary cap ===
According to the new collective bargaining agreement, the 2016 salary cap was set at $5,100,000 (average $110,986 per active roster spot). As per the agreement, the cap was fixed and did not vary with league revenue performance. The base minimum individual salary was set at $52,000.

=== Season schedule ===
On February 18, 2016, the 2016 season schedule was released, with the regular season opener taking place at BMO Field hosted by the Toronto Argonauts on June 23. This was the first time that the Argonauts hosted a season opener since the 2008 CFL season and the first time a new stadium opened the season since Winnipeg's Investors Group Field opened the 2013 season. For the third consecutive season, week 1 featured a Grey Cup rematch, with the defending champion Edmonton Eskimos hosting the Ottawa Redblacks. This was also the first time since 2012 that all member clubs played all pre-season and regular season games at their regular home stadiums.

The 2015 featured eight home-and-home series; three of those featured Saskatchewan and/or Winnipeg, while the Montreal Alouettes played none. There were 21 double headers this year, with three on Thursdays, eight on Fridays, eight on Saturdays, and two (the traditional Labour Day and Thanksgiving contests, with the Ontario Labour Day game being played in prime time for the first time ever) on Mondays. There also was a triple header for the first time since 2007, with three games on the final day of the regular season on Saturday, November 5. For the second consecutive season, the last week of the regular season featured inter-divisional games. This was the second straight season to showcase Thursday Night Football with 10 of the first 11 weeks featuring Thursday night games, including the three aforementioned Thursday night double headers. Every CFL team hosted at least one Thursday game this season; Montreal hosted the most with three Thursday home games.

=== Toronto Argonauts stadium and ownership ===
After having spent 27 seasons at Rogers Centre, the Toronto Argonauts moved to BMO Field following renovations that have made the stadium suitable for Canadian football. The move was prompted in 2013 when Rogers Communications announced plans to install natural grass at Rogers Centre for the 2018 season—a move that will require the stadium to be permanently locked into its baseball configuration. On May 20, 2015, it was announced the team had been sold to Larry Tanenbaum and Bell Media and would move to BMO Field. Bell Media and Tanenbaum are part-owners of Maple Leaf Sports & Entertainment, the company that owns Major League Soccer's Toronto FC and operates BMO Field, along with Rogers. The stadium underwent renovations in the off-season between 2014 and 2015, raising stadium capacity for soccer to 30,991. Further renovations took place in the off-season between 2015 and 2016 to add canopy roofs and retractable seating in the end zones for a Canadian football field. However, Toronto FC continue to be primary occupants of the stadium and have first choice of game dates.

=== New uniform supplier ===
Adidas, who has held the contract for CFL uniforms since acquiring Reebok in 2005, switched the league's uniforms from the Reebok brand (which was used for the uniforms the previous twelve seasons, dating to 2004, the season before Adidas's purchase) to the Adidas brand. With the rebrand came some mostly minor adjustments to each of the teams' uniforms, which were unveiled May 12.

=== Coaching changes ===
On December 2, 2015 Jeff Tedford announced that he had resigned his position as head coach of the BC Lions. In his lone season with the Lions, Tedford led them to a mediocre record of 7−11, losing in the first round of the playoffs. Wally Buono will resume the head coaching duties. On December 7, 2015, a mere week after winning the 2015 Grey Cup, it was announced that Chris Jones would be the new general manager and head coach of the Saskatchewan Roughriders. After starting 0−9 during the 2015 season, the Saskatchewan Roughriders fired Corey Chamblin. Bob Dyce was the intern head coach for the remainder of the 2015 season. In response to losing Chris Jones, the Eskimos named former Redblacks offensive coordinator Jason Maas as their new head coach on December 14, 2015. Jason Maas had played quarterback for the Eskimos for 10 seasons from the 2000 CFL season until the 2011 CFL season.

Following this fury of coaching changes, new CFL commissioner Jeffrey Orridge announced on December 16, 2015, that any coach who is currently under contract with a CFL team must contact the CFL head office for approval, prior to announcing any movement. This moratorium was designed to prevent CFL teams from tampering with coaches under contract, and also to hold coaches honorable to their contracts (unless the general manager of said franchise allows them to become a free agent by voiding their contract). In April 2016 commissioner Orridge ruled that the Eskimos did not owe the Redblacks any financial compensation for their hiring of Jason Maas.

Hamilton Tiger-Cats head coach and vice president Kent Austin, who had also served as general manager for his first three seasons in Hamilton, promoted Eric Tillman to general manager for the 2014 season. Tillman had served as a consultant with the Tiger-Cats since the 2012 season.

==== In-season ====
Midway through the 2016 season, Montreal Alouettes general manager Jim Popp, who had doubled as interim head coach of the team since firing Tom Higgins partway through the previous season, stepped aside from coaching duties and named Jacques Chapdelaine as his replacement. Chapdelaine is the first French-speaking head coach in the history of the Alouettes organization.

=== New drug policy ===
On April 21, 2016, the CFL and CFLPA announced an agreement on a new drug strategy. There was no drug testing last year after the CFL severed its partnership with the Canadian Centre for Ethics in Sports (CCES), which had conducted the tests. The relationship was mended, and CCES resumed its role of administering testing on players. Under the terms of the agreement, the number of tests conducted was equal to 100 per cent of the players in the league. However, because testing will be random, it was possible for some players to be tested twice, while others wouldn't be tested at all. The new system also recognised sanctions from Canadian Interuniversity Sport (CIS)--later renamed to U Sports—as well as the National Collegiate Athletic Association (NCAA), National Football League (NFL) and other World Anti-Doping Agency-tested sports. The teams and league were to provide appropriate NSF International-certified supplements to their players, with the list to be developed by mutual agreement and based on professional advice.

Regarding player violations, those testing positive would face a two-game suspension for a first violation. This penalty would increase to a nine-game suspension (half the regular season) for a second violation and a one-year ban for a third offence. A fourth violation would result in a lifetime ban. Violations were now to be publicly disclosed once all appeals had been exhausted: Whereas in the former system a player charged with a first time offence was able to have his identity remain confidential. The CFL commissioner could also reduce a suspension based on exceptional circumstance.

=== NFL-CFL Officiating Development Program ===
On April 22, 2016, the CFL and the NFL announced a landmark joint-partnership involving their officiating staff. NFL-trained referees would officiate preseason and regular-season games in the CFL, while CFL officials would attend NFL training camps and education sessions before working pre-season games in the NFL. NFL referees working CFL games would mostly be side and field judges to minimize the rules differences between the two leagues. Several CFL officials would participate in the NFL's Officiating Development Program, including working NFL mini-camps, training camps and preseason games. Analysts saw this agreement as the first step towards having U.S.-trained officials work in the CFL full-time. Previously, one of the major stumbling blocks for U.S.-born officials working in the CFL was it took them off the track to the NFL. But a development program between the two leagues could lead to officials graduating from the CFL to the NFL.

=== Rule changes ===
In March the CFL's Rules Committee submitted a variety of rule changes to the Board of Governors be implemented for the 2016 season. The proposals were reviewed by the CFL's Board of Governors and almost all of them were put into effect for the upcoming season.

==== Accepted ====
- An additional video official in the command centre (in Toronto) with a mandate to quickly fix obvious errors that are not challengeable by replay
- The following plays would be reviewable:
  - Passing plays - offensive pass interference, illegal contact and illegal interference
  - Special teams - no yards, illegal blocks on kick plays, contacting/roughing the kicker or passer, and illegal interference at the point of reception on kick off attempts
- Unsuccessful two-point conversion attempts are automatically reviewed by the replay official
- Prohibiting players from pushing blockers through gaps in the offensive line on single point conversion attempts and field goal attempts
- Expand the definition of a "peel back" block to make it illegal for any offensive player to block an opponent low anywhere on the field when he is moving towards his own goal line, not just those players that start the play in the Close Line Play Area, commonly referred to as the tackle box
- Modifying the standard for Illegal Procedure penalty to now allow line players to move slightly, point, or make signals for blocking assignments while in a three-point stance before coming to a set position for one second prior to the snap
- Administrative and Technical changes:
  - The concept of off-setting penalties would be created for some scenarios, such as when the defense is offside and the offence commits holding on the player who is offside, which would result in no yardage difference being applied and the down being replayed
  - No longer allowing a team that gives up a field goal in the last three minutes of a game to choose to scrimmage the ball instead of receiving a kick off
  - A player who gives an opponent's offensive ball to a fan after a turnover is ruled on the field would no longer be flagged for objectionable conduct, which had been an unintended consequence of allowing offences to use their own footballs

==== Rejected ====
- A rule pertaining to how far downfield offensive linemen can block on a pass play. The proposed rule will be reconsidered next year.

==== Mid-season change ====
- On August 27 (midway through Week 10): If a team makes its first coach's challenge of the game and does not win that challenge, the team will now lose a timeout. If the team wins its challenge, it will keep its timeout. Jeffrey L. Orridge, commissioner of the CFL. said the following, "while it's unusual to have a rule change during the season, the league and our teams wanted to respond to fans' concerns about the frequency of challenges." This rule change was unanimously approved Thursday by the league's governors following a recommendation from its rules committee.

=== Roughriders roster violations ===
In the middle of August the Saskatchewan Roughriders were found to be in violation of policies which prohibit practicing with ineligible players, players participating in practice who are on the 6-Game Injured List and having free agents practice with players who are under contract. The CFL decided to fine the Saskatchewan Roughriders $60,000, as well as a deduction in excess of $26,000 off the Roughriders' 2016 salary cap. The investigation was partially brought to the public spotlight by Stampeders quarterback Bo Levi Mitchell on Twitter.

=== Live Microphone Broadcasts ===
In the middle of the season the CFL and broadcasting company TSN introduced live microphone audio from the head coach and quarterback as part of the broadcast experience. The first game this was implemented was a Labour Day weekend game between the Tiger-Cats and Stampeders. The CFL ON TSN's inaugural Live Mic Broadcast saw a total of 2.4 million Canadians tune in. Live Mic Broadcast was next implemented in three Thanksgiving weekend games; this time expanded to include back-up quarterbacks and select defensive players. Edmonton Eskimos head coach Jason Maas and starting quarterback Mike Reilly both refused to wear the live microphones for their Thanksgiving game. As a result, the CFL fined the Eskimos $20,000 and head coach Jason Maas $15,000 for refusing to wear live broadcast microphones. The Eskimos were once again required to submit to the live microphone broadcasts for their Week 20 game against the Argonauts. Prior to the game both Jason Maas and Mike Reilly confirmed they would comply with the league's command and wear the microphones. However, on gameday despite wearing the microphone Maas stood silent for most of the game and covered his mic at times when he was speaking. On November 24, 2016, the CFL announced they were investigating the issue since the team "didn't live up to the spirit of the agreement."

== Regular season ==
=== Structure ===
Teams played eighteen regular season games, playing two divisional opponents three times and all of the other teams twice. Teams were awarded two points for a win and one point for a tie. The top three teams in each division qualified for the playoffs, with the first place team gaining a bye to the divisional finals. A fourth place team in one division may qualify ahead of the third place team in the other division (the "Crossover"), if they earn more points in the season. If a third-place team finishes in a tie with the fourth place team in the other division, the third place team automatically gets the playoff spot and there is no crossover.

If two or more teams in the same division were equal in points, the following tiebreakers applied:

1. Most wins in all games
2. Head to head winning percentage (matches won divided by all matches played)
3. Head to head points difference
4. Head to head points ratio
5. Tiebreakers 3–5 applied sequentially to all divisional games
6. Tiebreakers 4 and 5 applied sequentially to all league games
7. Coin toss

Notes:

- 1. If two clubs remain tied after other club(s) are eliminated during any step, tie breakers reverts to step 2.

=== Standings ===
Note: GP = Games Played, W = Wins, L = Losses, T = Ties, PF = Points For, PA = Points Against, Pts = Points

Teams in bold are in playoff positions.

West Division
Team	GP	W	L	T	Pts	PF	PA	Div	Stk	
**Calgary Stampeders**	18	15	2	1	31	586	369	9–1	L1	Details
**BC Lions**	18	12	6	0	24	545	454	5–5	W3	Details
**Winnipeg Blue Bombers**	18	11	7	0	22	497	454	5–5	W1	Details
**Edmonton Eskimos**	18	10	8	0	20	549	496	5–5	W2	Details
Saskatchewan Roughriders	18	5	13	0	10	350	530	1–9	L3	Details

East Division
Team	GP	W	L	T	Pts	PF	PA	Div	Stk	
**Ottawa Redblacks**	18	8	9	1	17	486	498	5–3	L1	Details
**Hamilton Tiger-Cats**	18	7	11	0	14	507	502	5–3	L2	Details
Montreal Alouettes	18	7	11	0	14	383	416	3–5	W3	Details
Toronto Argonauts	18	5	13	0	10	383	568	3–5	L7	Details

- Edmonton (4th place in the West Division) qualified for the Crossover ahead of Montreal (3rd place in the East Division) because Edmonton had 10 wins, Montreal had 7 wins.
- Hamilton finished 2nd place in the East Division because they won their 3-game regular season series against Montreal (2–1).

== CFL playoffs ==
The Redblacks ended a 40-year championship drought for the city of Ottawa that spanned three CFL franchises and 27 football seasons of play. The Redblacks became the fourth-fastest expansion team to win a championship in an established North American professional sports league. Ottawa's quarterback, Henry Burris won the Grey Cup Most Valuable Player award, while teammate wide receiver Brad Sinopoli won the Grey Cup's Most Valuable Canadian award.

=== Playoff bracket ===
November 13: Division Semi-Finals
East
W4	Edmonton Eskimos	24
E2	Hamilton Tiger-Cats	21
West
W3	Winnipeg Blue Bombers	31
W2	BC Lions	32

November 20: Division Finals
W4	Edmonton Eskimos	23
E1	Ottawa Redblacks	35
W2	BC Lions	15
W1	Calgary Stampeders	42

November 27: 104th Grey Cup; BMO Field – Toronto
E1	Ottawa Redblacks	39*
W1	Calgary Stampeders	33

*-Team won in Overtime.

== Award winners ==
=== CFL Top Performers of the Week ===
Week	First	Second	Third	Fans' Choice
One	Simoni Lawrence	Trevor Harris	Chris Williams	Simoni Lawrence
Two	Trevor Harris	Chris Williams	Jerome Messam	Trevor Harris
Three	Chris Williams	Maurice Leggett	Adarius Bowman	Maurice Leggett
Four	Adrian Tracy	Trevor Harris	Jonathon Jennings	Trevor Harris
Five	Jeremiah Masoli	Naaman Roosevelt	Mike Reilly	Naaman Roosevelt
Six	Bo Levi Mitchell	Lirim Hajrullahu	A. J. Jefferson	Bo Levi Mitchell
Seven	Jerome Messam	Loucheiz Purifoy	Rene Paredes	Jerome Messam
Eight	Kevin Fogg	Clarence Denmark	Deon Lacey	Kevin Fogg
Nine	Kevin Glenn	Zach Collaros	Patrick Watkins	Zach Collaros
Ten	Shakir Bell	Andrew Harris	Justin Medlock	Andrew Harris
Eleven	Justin Medlock	Solomon Elimimian	Quincy McDuffie	Justin Medlock
Twelve	Jeremiah Johnson	T. J. Heath	DaVaris Daniels	T. J. Heath
Thirteen	Larry Dean	Bo Levi Mitchell	Emanuel Davis	Larry Dean
Fourteen	Emmanuel Arceneaux	Jamill Smith	Bo Levi Mitchell	Bo Levi Mitchell
Fifteen	John White	Solomon Elimimian	Mike Reilly	Mike Reilly
Sixteen	Bryan Burnham	Mike Reilly	John White	Mike Reilly
Seventeen	Henry Burris	Taylor Loffler	Joe McKnight	Taylor Loffler
Eighteen	Emmanuel Arceneaux	John Chick	Jerome Messam	John Chick
Nineteen	Solomon Elimimian	Taylor Reed	Mossis Madu	Mossis Madu
Twenty	Emmanuel Arceneaux	James Franklin	Brandon Zylstra	

=== CFL Top Performers of the Month ===
Month	First	Second	Third
July	Chris Williams	Trevor Harris	Mike Reilly
August	Bo Levi Mitchell	Rene Paredes	Terrence Toliver
September	Bo Levi Mitchell	Adarius Bowman	Solomon Elimimian
October	John White	Emmanuel Arceneaux	Mike Reilly

== 2016 All-Stars ==
=== Offence ===
- QB – Bo Levi Mitchell, Calgary Stampeders
- RB – Jerome Messam, Calgary Stampeders
- RB – Andrew Harris, Winnipeg Blue Bombers
- R – Adarius Bowman, Edmonton Eskimos
- R – Emmanuel Arceneaux, BC Lions
- R – Derel Walker, Edmonton Eskimos
- R – Ernest Jackson, Ottawa Redblacks
- OT – Derek Dennis, Calgary Stampeders
- OT – Jovan Olafioye, BC Lions
- OG – Travis Bond, Winnipeg Blue Bombers
- OG – Spencer Wilson, Calgary Stampeders
- OC – Jon Gott, Ottawa Redblacks

=== Defence ===
- DT – Almondo Sewell, Edmonton Eskimos
- DT – Micah Johnson, Calgary Stampeders
- DE – Charleston Hughes, Calgary Stampeders
- DE – John Chick, Hamilton Tiger-Cats
- LB – Solomon Elimimian, BC Lions
- LB – Adam Bighill, BC Lions
- LB – Bear Woods, Montreal Alouettes
- CB – Tommie Campbell, Calgary Stampeders
- CB – Ciante Evans, Calgary Stampeders
- DB – Jamar Wall, Calgary Stampeders
- DB – T.J. Heath, Winnipeg Blue Bombers
- S – Taylor Loffler, Winnipeg Blue Bombers

=== Special teams ===
- K – Justin Medlock, Winnipeg Blue Bombers
- P – Richie Leone, BC Lions
- ST – Chris Rainey, BC Lions

== 2016 CFL Western All-Stars ==
=== Offence ===
- QB – Bo Levi Mitchell, Calgary Stampeders
- RB – Jerome Messam, Calgary Stampeders
- RB – Andrew Harris, Winnipeg Blue Bombers
- R – Adarius Bowman, Edmonton Eskimos
- R – Emmanuel Arceneaux, BC Lions
- R – Derel Walker, Edmonton Eskimos
- R – Bryan Burnham, BC Lions
- OT – Derek Dennis, Calgary Stampeders
- OT – Jovan Olafioye, BC Lions
- OG – Travis Bond, Winnipeg Blue Bombers
- OG – Spencer Wilson, Calgary Stampeders
- OC – Justin Sorensen, Edmonton Eskimos

=== Defence ===
- DT – Almondo Sewell, Edmonton Eskimos
- DT – Micah Johnson, Calgary Stampeders
- DE – Charleston Hughes, Calgary Stampeders
- DE – Alex Bazzie, BC Lions
- LB – Solomon Elimimian, BC Lions
- LB – Adam Bighill, BC Lions
- LB – Maurice Leggett, Winnipeg Blue Bombers
- CB – Tommie Campbell, Calgary Stampeders
- CB – Ciante Evans, Calgary Stampeders
- DB – Jamar Wall, Calgary Stampeders
- DB – T.J. Heath, Winnipeg Blue Bombers
- S – Taylor Loffler, Winnipeg Blue Bombers

=== Special teams ===
- K – Justin Medlock, Winnipeg Blue Bombers
- P – Richie Leone, BC Lions
- ST – Chris Rainey, BC Lions

== 2016 CFL Eastern All-Stars ==
=== Offence ===
- QB – Trevor Harris, Ottawa Redblacks
- RB – Brandon Whitaker, Toronto Argonauts
- RB – C. J. Gable, Hamilton Tiger-Cats
- R – Ernest Jackson, Ottawa Redblacks
- R – Greg Ellingson, Ottawa Redblacks
- R – Chris Williams, Ottawa Redblacks
- R – Nik Lewis, Montreal Alouettes
- OT – SirVincent Rogers, Ottawa Redblacks
- OT – Chris Van Zeyl, Toronto Argonauts
- OG – Ryan Bomben, Hamilton Tiger-Cats
- OG – Tyler Holmes, Toronto Argonauts
- OC – Jon Gott, Ottawa Redblacks

=== Defence ===
- DT – Ted Laurent, Hamilton Tiger-Cats
- DT – Zack Evans, Ottawa Redblacks
- DE – John Chick, Hamilton Tiger-Cats
- DE – Shawn Lemon, Toronto Argonauts
- LB – Simoni Lawrence, Hamilton Tiger-Cats
- LB – Bear Woods, Montreal Alouettes
- LB – Damaso Munoz, Ottawa Redblacks
- CB – Mitchell White, Ottawa Redblacks
- CB – Jonathan Rose, Ottawa Redblacks
- DB – Emanuel Davis, Hamilton Tiger-Cats
- DB – Abdul Kanneh, Ottawa Redblacks
- S – Marc-Olivier Brouillette, Montreal Alouettes

=== Special teams ===
- K – Lirim Hajrullahu, Toronto Argonauts
- P – Brett Maher, Hamilton Tiger-Cats
- ST – Brandon Banks, Hamilton Tiger-Cats

== 2016 CFL awards ==
- CFL's Most Outstanding Player Award – Bo Levi Mitchell, QB (Calgary Stampeders)
- CFL's Most Outstanding Canadian Award – Jerome Messam, RB (Calgary Stampeders)
- CFL's Most Outstanding Defensive Player Award – Solomon Elimimian, LB (BC Lions)
- CFL's Most Outstanding Offensive Lineman Award – Derek Dennis, OL (Calgary Stampeders)
- CFL's Most Outstanding Rookie Award – DaVaris Daniels, REC (Calgary Stampeders)
- John Agro Special Teams Award – Justin Medlock, P/K (Winnipeg Blue Bombers)
- Tom Pate Memorial Award – Marco Iannuzzi, REC (BC Lions)
- Jake Gaudaur Veterans' Trophy – Matt Black, DB (Toronto Argonauts)
- Annis Stukus Trophy – Dave Dickenson, Head Coach (Calgary Stampeders)
- Commissioner's Award – Jason Colero (Toronto Argonauts)
- Hugh Campbell Distinguished Leadership Award – Norman Kwong, RB (Calgary Stampeders & Edmonton Eskimos), GM (Calgary Stampeders)

== Attendances ==
Team	Home average	% of capacity	League average difference	Visitor average	% of capacity	League average difference
BC	21,055.9	76.57	-3,635.6	25,416.0	78.49	+724.5
Calgary	27,474.2	77.61	+2,782.7	24,361.9	78.98	-329.6
Edmonton	30,998.0	55.06	+6,306.5	24,174.7	82.84	-516.8
Hamilton	24,001.3	98.77	-690.1	24,441.2	76.32	-250.3
Montreal	20,377.8	86.71	-4,313.7	23,872.8	75.04	-818.7
Ottawa	24,673.0	100.07	-18.5	23,025.2	72.88	-1,666.3
Saskatchewan	31,327.0	93.72	+6,635.5	27,054.0	78.96	+2,362.5
Toronto	16,380.3	60.67	-8,311.1	25,967.6	82.53	+1,276.1
Winnipeg	25,935.8	77.60	+1,244.3	23,910.0	74.85	-781.5
League Avg.	24,691.5	77.83	N/A	24,691.5	77.83	N/A
