= 2020 Montreal Alouettes season =

Canadian football team season

- General manager: Danny Maciocia
- Head coach: Khari Jones
- Home stadium: Percival Molson Memorial Stadium

Results
- Record: N/A
- Division place: N/A, East
- Playoffs: Season cancelled

The 2020 Montreal Alouettes season was scheduled to be the 54th season for the team in the Canadian Football League (CFL) and their 66th overall.

The 2020 CFL season would have been the second season for Khari Jones as the Alouettes' head coach and offensive coordinator as he had the "interim" tag removed after he agreed to a three-year extension on November 26, 2019. This also would have been his first full season, including pre-season, as the team's head coach. It would have been the first season under the ownership of S and S Sportsco, which is operated by Sid Spiegel and Gary Stern. The new owners appointed Danny Maciocia as the team's general manager and named local media executive Mario Cecchini as the team's new president.

Training camps, pre-season games, and regular season games were initially postponed due to the COVID-19 pandemic in Montreal. The CFL announced on April 7, 2020 that the start of the 2020 season would not occur before July 2020. On May 20, 2020, it was announced that the league would likely not begin regular season play prior to September 2020. On August 17, 2020 however, the season was officially cancelled due to COVID-19.

== Offseason ==
=== CFL national draft ===
The 2020 CFL National Draft took place on April 30, 2020. The Alouettes had ten selections in the eight-round draft, including four selections within the first 25 picks. Notably, the Alouettes traded their first-round pick to the Hamilton Tiger-Cats in the trade for Johnny Manziel.

Round	Pick	Player	Position	School	Hometown
2	14	Marc-Antoine Dequoy	DB	Montreal	Montreal, QC
2	16	Cameron Lawson	DL	Queen's	Caledon, ON
3	22	Carter O′Donnell	OL	Alberta	Red Deer, AB
3	25	Benoit Marion	DL	Montreal	Montreal, QC
4	33	Brian Harelimana	LB	Montreal	Laval, QC
6	49	Andrew Becker	OL	Regina	Kelowna, BC
6	51	Jersey Henry	HB	Concordia	LaSalle, QC
7	60	Vincent Alessandrini	SB	Concordia	Laval, QC
8	66	Brock Gowanlock	DL	Manitoba	Duncan, BC
8	69	Colton Klassen	RB	Saskatchewan	Saskatoon, SK

=== CFL global draft ===
The 2020 CFL global draft was scheduled to take place on April 16, 2020. However, due to the COVID-19 pandemic, this draft and its accompanying combine were postponed to occur just before the start of training camp, which was ultimately cancelled. The Alouettes were scheduled to select fifth in each round with the number of rounds never announced.

== Planned schedule ==
=== Preseason ===
Week	Game	Date	Kickoff	Opponent	TV	Venue
A	Bye					
B	1	Fri, May 29	7:30 p.m. EDT	at Ottawa Redblacks	NA	TD Place Stadium
C	2	Sat, June 6	1:00 p.m. EDT	vs. Toronto Argonauts	NA	Molson Stadium

=== Regular season ===
Week	Game	Date	Kickoff	Opponent	TV	Venue
1	1	Fri, June 12	10:00 p.m. EDT	at Calgary Stampeders	TSN/RDS	McMahon Stadium
2	2	Fri, June 19	9:00 p.m. EDT	at Saskatchewan Roughriders	TSN/RDS	Mosaic Stadium
3	Bye					
4	3	Thu, July 2	7:00 p.m. EDT	vs. Ottawa Redblacks	TSN/RDS	Molson Stadium
5	4	Thu, July 9	8:30 p.m. EDT	at Winnipeg Blue Bombers	TSN/RDS	IG Field
6	5	Fri, July 17	7:00 p.m. EDT	vs. Calgary Stampeders	TSN/RDS	Molson Stadium
7	6	Thu, July 23	10:00 p.m. EDT	at BC Lions	TSN/RDS	BC Place
8	7	Sat, Aug 1	7:00 p.m. EDT	vs. BC Lions	TSN/RDS	Molson Stadium
9	8	Fri, Aug 7	7:30 p.m. EDT	at Hamilton Tiger-Cats	TSN/RDS	Tim Hortons Field
10	9	Thu, Aug 13	7:00 p.m. EDT	vs. Saskatchewan Roughriders	TSN/RDS	Molson Stadium
11	10	Fri, Aug 21	7:00 p.m. EDT	vs. Ottawa Redblacks	TSN/RDS	Molson Stadium
12	11	Fri, Aug 28	7:00 p.m. EDT	at Toronto Argonauts	TSN/RDS	BMO Field
13	Bye					
14	12	Fri, Sept 11	7:30 p.m. EDT	at Ottawa Redblacks	TSN/RDS	TD Place Stadium
15	13	Fri, Sept 18	7:00 p.m. EDT	vs. Edmonton Football Team	TSN/RDS	Molson Stadium
16	14	Fri, Sept 25	7:00 p.m. EDT	at Hamilton Tiger-Cats	TSN/RDS	Tim Hortons Field
17	15	Sat, Oct 3	4:00 p.m. EDT	vs. Hamilton Tiger-Cats	TSN/RDS	Molson Stadium
18	16	Mon, Oct 12	1:00 p.m. EDT	vs. Toronto Argonauts	TSN/RDS	Molson Stadium
19	Bye					
20	17	Sat, Oct 24	4:00 p.m. EDT	at Edmonton Football Team	TSN/RDS	Commonwealth Stadium
21	18	Sat, Oct 31	4:00 p.m. EDT	vs. Winnipeg Blue Bombers	TSN/RDS	Molson Stadium

== Team ==
=== Roster ===
Montreal Alouettes roster
**Quarterbacks**: 8 Vernon Adams; -- Darius-James Peterson; 6 Hugo Richard; 18 Matthew Shiltz; **Receivers**: 19 Dante Absher; 2 Mario Alford; 4 Quan Bray; 88 Malcolm Carter; 85 B. J. Cunningham; 81 Felix Faubert-Lussier; 70 Fabian Guerra; 83 Malachi Jones; 11 Kaion Julien-Grant; 87 Geno Lewis; 89 Chris Osei-Kusi; 82 Naaman Roosevelt; 9 Jake Wieneke	**Running backs**: 21 Jeshrun Antwi; 35 Dominick Bragalone; 22 Shaq Murray-Lawrence; 20 Tyrell Sutton; 32 James Wilder Jr.; **Fullbacks**: 84 Étienne Moisan; 80 Spencer Moore; 38 Christophe Normand; **Offensive linemen**: 61 Donald Hawkins; 53 Philippe Gagnon; 64 Sean Jamieson; 60 Tyler Johnstone; 62 Diego Kuhlmann; 51 Kristian Matte; 55 Landon Rice; 66 Trey Rutherford; 54 Chris Schleuger; 65 Samuel Thomassin; 67 Tony Washington; 59 Zach Wilkinson	**Defensive linemen**: 90 Nate Anderson; 48 Bo Banner DE; 97 Woody Baron DT; 42 Jean-Samuel Blanc; 7 John Bowman DE; 96 Chase DeMoor; 99 Lord Hyeamang DT; 76 Anthony Luke; 94 Junior Luke; 52 David Ménard; 79 Elijah Norris; 98 Kingsley Opara; 91 Javon Rolland-Jones DE; 95 Michael Sanelli; 93 Antonio Simmons DE; 45 Logan Tago; 5 Adrian Tracy DE; **Linebackers**: 44 Frédéric Chagnon; 57 Tevin Floyd; 34 Alexandre Gagné; 41 Jason Hall; 47 D. J. Lalama; 10 Hénoc Muamba; 49 Jean-Gabriel Poulin; 46 Paris Taylor; 50 Benjamin Whiting	**Defensive backs**: 29 Bryan Blunt; 25 Ryan Carter; 39 Cody Cranston; 30 Ty Cranston; 36 Davante Davis; 24 Devron Davis; 0 Ciante Evans; 23 Kevin Fogg; 31 Marloshawn Franklin; 22 Tyquan Glass; 1 Monshadrik Hunter; 33 Jarnor Jones; 16 Taylor Loffler; 12 Najee Murray; 26 Greg Reid; 43 Dominique Termansen; 26 Darius West; **Special teams**: 37 Martin Bédard LS; 15 Tyler Crapigna K/P; 40 Mike Benson LS; 72 Felix Ménard-Brière K/P; 3 Ryan Santoso P
Italics indicate American player • **Bold** indicates Global player • 85 Roster; Roster updated 2020-08-17 • Depth chart • Transactions

=== Coaching staff ===
Montreal Alouettes staff
**Front office**: Owner – S and S Sportsco (Sid Spiegel and Gary Stern); President/CEO – Mario Cecchini; General manager – Danny Maciocia; Assistant general manager – Tom Gamble; Senior player personnel executive – Brendan Taman; Director of national scouting – Byron Archambault; Director of football operations – Éric Deslauriers; Manager of football operations – Cailtin Bell; **Head coach**: Head coach – Khari Jones; Assistant head coach – André Bolduc; **Offensive coaches**: Offensive Coordinator & Quarterbacks – Khari Jones; Offensive line – Vacant; Receivers – Robert Gordon; Running backs – André Bolduc; Assistant offensive line – Luc Brodeur-Jourdain; Offensive assistant – Michael Lionello	**Defensive coaches**: Defensive Coordinator & Linebackers – Bob Slowik; Defensive line – Todd Howard; Defensive Backs & Pass Game Coordinator – Barron Miles; Defensive assistant – Vincent Nardone; **Special teams coaches**: Special teams coordinator – Mickey Donovan; **Staff**: Equipment manager – Greg McGuire; Assistant equipment manager – Ryan Batten; Head athletic therapist – Rodney Sassi; → Coaching staff
