= 2016 Montreal Alouettes season =

Canadian football team season

- General manager: Jim Popp
- Head coach: Jim Popp (3–9); Jacques Chapdelaine (4–2)
- Home stadium: Percival Molson Memorial Stadium

Results
- Record: 7–11
- Division place: 3rd, East
- Playoffs: did not qualify
- Team MOP: Bear Woods
- Team MOC: Samuel Giguere
- Team MOR: Jonathon Mincy

Uniform

The 2016 Montreal Alouettes season was the 50th season for the team in the Canadian Football League (CFL) and their 62nd overall. The Alouettes finished the season in third place in the East Division with a 7–11 record. Although this was a slight improvement upon their 6–12 record from 2015, it was still not good enough to get them back into the playoffs, as they lost the season series to the Hamilton Tiger-Cats (also 7–11) and thus, having to settle for 3rd place, behind the "crossover" team from the West, the Edmonton Eskimos (10–8). It was the first time the team missed the playoffs in back-to-back years since their reactivation.

Jim Popp returned as head coach for his second full season as head coach (his first being the 2007 season) and again led the Alouettes to another non-winning season. Popp also remained the team's general manager, a position he had held for the last 21 seasons since the team returned to Montreal in 1996. During the team's week 14 bye, Popp stepped down as head coach, and named receivers coach Jacques Chapdelaine as interim head coach for the remainder of the season. Popp remained with the team as their general manager.

== Offseason ==
=== CFL draft ===
The 2016 CFL draft took place on May 10, 2016. The Alouettes had eight selections in the eight-round draft, including the second overall pick, which was their highest pick since returning to the league in 1996.

Round	Pick	Player	Position	School/Club team
1	2	Philippe Gagnon	OL	Laval
2	11	Wayne Moore	RB	McMaster
3	20	Sean Jamieson	OL	Western Ontario
4	29	George Johnson	WR	Western Ontario
6	47	A'dre Fraser	WR	Guelph
6	50	Emmitt Tims	WR	Saskatchewan
7	56	Maiko Zepeda	DB	Montreal
8	64	Matthew Toppan	OL	Guelph

== Preseason ==
Week	Date	Kickoff	Opponent	Results		TV	Venue	Attendance	Summary
Week	Date	Kickoff	Opponent	Score	Record	TV	Venue	Attendance	Summary
A	Wed, June 8	8:00 p.m. EDT	at Winnipeg Blue Bombers	L 13–36	0–1	TSN/RDS	Investors Group Field	23,334	Recap
B	Fri, June 17	7:30 p.m. EDT	vs. Toronto Argonauts	W 22–15	1–1	TSN/RDS	Molson Stadium	14,882	Recap

# Games played with white uniforms.

== Regular season ==
=== Standings ===
East Division
Team	GP	W	L	T	Pts	PF	PA	Div	Stk	
Ottawa Redblacks	18	8	9	1	17	486	498	5–3	L1	Details
Hamilton Tiger-Cats	18	7	11	0	14	507	502	5–3	L2	Details
Montreal Alouettes	18	7	11	0	14	383	416	3–5	W3	Details
Toronto Argonauts	18	5	13	0	10	383	568	3–5	L7	Details

=== Schedule ===
Week	Date	Kickoff	Opponent	Results		TV	Venue	Attendance	Summary
Week	Date	Kickoff	Opponent	Score	Record	TV	Venue	Attendance	Summary
1	Fri, June 24	8:30 p.m. EDT	at Winnipeg Blue Bombers	W 22–14	1–0	TSN/RDS/ESPN2	Investors Group Field	26,433	Recap
2	Thurs, June 30	7:00 p.m. EDT	vs. Ottawa Redblacks	L 13–28	1–1	TSN/RDS/ESPN2	Molson Stadium	21,522	Recap
3	Bye								
4	Fri, July 15	7:30 p.m. EDT	vs. Hamilton Tiger-Cats	L 7–31	1–2	TSN/RDS	Molson Stadium	20,098	Recap
5	Mon, July 25	7:30 p.m. EDT	at Toronto Argonauts	L 17–30	1–3	TSN/RDS/ESPN2	BMO Field	16,048	Recap
6	Fri, July 29	7:00 p.m. EDT	vs. Saskatchewan Roughriders	W 41–3	2–3	TSN/RDS	Molson Stadium	20,018	Recap
7	Thurs, Aug 4	7:00 p.m. EDT	vs. BC Lions	L 18–38	2–4	TSN/RDS/ESPN2	Molson Stadium	19,125	Recap
8	Thurs, Aug 11	9:00 p.m. EDT	at Edmonton Eskimos	L 12–23	2–5	TSN/RDS/ESPN2	Commonwealth Stadium	26,061	Recap
9	Fri, Aug 19	7:00 p.m. EDT	at Ottawa Redblacks	W 43–19	3–5	TSN/RDS	TD Place Stadium	24,907	Recap
10	Fri, Aug 26	7:30 p.m. EDT	vs. Winnipeg Blue Bombers	L 18–32	3–6	TSN/RDS	Molson Stadium	19,026	Recap
11	Thurs, Sept 1	7:30 p.m. EDT	vs. Ottawa Redblacks	L 14–19	3–7	TSN/RDS	Molson Stadium	19,117	Recap
12	Fri, Sept 9	10:00 p.m. EDT	at BC Lions	L 27–38	3–8	TSN/RDS	BC Place	18,107	Recap
13	Fri, Sept 16	7:00 p.m. EDT	at Hamilton Tiger-Cats	L 17–20	3–9	TSN/RDS	Tim Hortons Field	23,612	Recap
14	Bye								
15	Sun, Oct 2	1:00 p.m. EDT	vs. Toronto Argonauts	W 38–11	4–9	TSN2/RDS	Molson Stadium	23,420	Recap
16	Mon, Oct 10	1:00 p.m. EDT	vs. Edmonton Eskimos	L 20–40	4–10	TSN/RDS	Molson Stadium	20,512	Recap
17	Sat, Oct 15	7:00 p.m. EDT	at Calgary Stampeders	L 8–22	4–11	TSN/RDS	McMahon Stadium	25,351	Recap
18	Sat, Oct 22	4:00 p.m. EDT	at Saskatchewan Roughriders	W 19–14	5–11	TSN/RDS	Mosaic Stadium	30,223	Recap
19	Sun, Oct 30	1:00 p.m. EST	vs. Calgary Stampeders	W 17–8	6–11	TSN/RDS	Molson Stadium	20,562	Recap
20	Sat, Nov 5	1:00 p.m. EST	at Hamilton Tiger-Cats	W 32–25	7–11	TSN/RDS	Tim Hortons Field	24,113	Recap

# Games played with colour uniforms.
# Games played with white uniforms.
# Games played with alternate uniforms.

== Roster ==
2015 Montreal Alouettes final roster
Quarterbacks: 3 Vernon Adams; 5 Shane Carden; 12 Rakeem Cato; Running backs: 46 Jean-Christophe Beaulieu; 0 Stefan Logan; 33 Cam McDaniel; 23 Brandon Rutley; Receivers: 84 Alex Charette; 85 B. J. Cunningham; 15 Sam Giguère; 81 Kyle Graves; 80 S. J. Haidara; 8 Nik Lewis; 88 Tiquan Underwood	Offensive linemen: 68 Philip Blake G; 58 Luc Brodeur-Jourdain C; 53 Philippe Gagnon T; 51 Kristian Matte C; 54 Jeff Perrett T; 62 Jake Piotrowski G; 69 Jacob Ruby T; 61 Ryan White T/G; Defensive linemen: 7 John Bowman DE; 91 Alan-Michael Cash DT; 95 Ray Drew DT; 94 DeQuin Evans DE; 99 Jesse Joseph DT; 55 Gabe Knapton DE; Special teams: 14 Boris Bede K/P; 98 Chad Bushley LS	Linebackers: 21 Chris Ackie; 42 Jean-Samuel Blanc; 52 Nicolas Boulay; 11 Chip Cox; 34 Kyries Hebert; 26 Nick Shortill; 31 Winston Venable; 48 Bear Woods; Defensive backs: 10 Marc-Olivier Brouillette; 22 Anthony Coady; 41 Tyree Hollins; 2 Jovon Johnson; 29 Jonathon Mincy; 43 Dom Termansen; 36 Daryl Townsend; 45 Khalid Wooten	Practice roster: 67 Michael Bamiro T; 66 James Bodanis G; 25 Martese Jackson RB; 1 Greg McGhee QB; 59 LaQuan McGowan T; 82 Alex Pierzchalski WR; Injured list: 37 Martin Bédard LS; 18 Jonathan Crompton QB; 16 Ethan Davis DB; 30 Anthony Fera K/P; 49 Jeff Finley DT; 19 S. J. Green SB; 35 Greg Henderson DB; 83 Marcus Henry SB; 90 Mike Klassen DT; 44 Jared Koster LB; 97 Aaron Lavarias DE; 39 Wayne Moore RB; 17 Billy Parker DB; 20 Tyrell Sutton RB; 6 Ramon Taylor DB; Italics indicate International players

== Coaching staff ==
2016 Montreal Alouettes staff
Front office: Owner – Bob Wetenhall; President/CEO – Mark Weightman; VP, General Manager and Director of Football Operations and Player Personnel – Jim Popp; Assistant general manager – Joey Abrams; Assistant director of pro/college scouting – Uzooma Okeke; Senior Player Personnel Executive/Salary Cap Analyst - Justin Casey; Director of us college scouting – Russ Lande; Football Operations Assistant/Scout –Eric Deslauriers; Coordinator of Football Administration - Catherine Raiche; Football operations/scouting assistant – Philippe Moreau; Head coaches: Interim head coach – Jacques Chapdelaine; Assistant head coach – Kavis Reed; Assistant head coach – Noel Thorpe; Offensive coaches: Offensive coordinator/quarterbacks – Anthony Calvillo; Offensive line – Kris Sweet; Receivers – Jacques Chapdelaine; Running backs – Paul Charbonneau; Offensive quality control – Jason Hogan	Defensive coaches: Defensive coordinator/defensive backs – Noel Thorpe; Defensive line – Anwar Stewart; Linebackers – Greg Quick; Special teams coaches: Special teams coordinator – Kavis Reed; Special teams assistant – André Bolduc; → Coaching staff
