= 2020 Hamilton Tiger-Cats season =

Cancelled Canadian Football League season

- General manager: Drew Allemang and Shawn Burke
- Head coach: Orlondo Steinauer
- Home stadium: Tim Hortons Field

Results
- Record: N/A
- Division place: N/A, East
- Playoffs: Season cancelled

The 2020 Hamilton Tiger-Cats season was scheduled to be the 63rd season for the team in the Canadian Football League (CFL) and their 71st overall. This would have been the second season for the Tiger-Cats under co-general managers Drew Allemang and Shawn Burke and the second season under head coach Orlondo Steinauer.

Training camps, pre-season games, and regular season games were initially postponed due to the COVID-19 pandemic in Ontario. The CFL announced on April 7, 2020 that the start of the 2020 season would not occur before July 2020. On May 20, 2020, it was announced that the league would likely not begin regular season play prior to September 2020. On August 17, 2020 however, the season was officially cancelled due to COVID-19.

== Offseason ==
=== CFL National Draft ===
The 2020 CFL National Draft took place on April 30, 2020. The Tiger-Cats had nine selections in the eight-round draft after acquiring another first-round pick from the Montreal Alouettes as part of the Johnny Manziel trade. By finishing as the Grey Cup runner up, the Tiger-Cats had the second-to-last selection in each round of the draft.

Round	Pick	Player	Position	University team	Hometown
1	5	Coulter Woodmansey	OL	Guelph	Toronto, ON
1	8	Mason Bennett	DL	North Dakota	Winnipeg, MB
2	17	Bailey Feltmate	LB	Acadia	Moncton, NB
3	27	Tyler Ternowski	WR	Waterloo	Hamilton, ON
4	36	Stavros Katsantonis	DB	British Columbia	Vancouver, BC
5	45	Joseph Bencze	DT	McMaster	Peterborough, ON
6	54	Jean Ventose	DB	British Columbia	Calgary, AB
7	63	J.J. Molson	K	UCLA	Montreal, QC
8	72	Tom Schnitzler	LB/LS	British Columbia	Saskatoon, SK

=== CFL global draft ===
The 2020 CFL global draft was scheduled to take place on April 16, 2020. However, due to the COVID-19 pandemic, this draft and its accompanying combine were postponed to occur just before the start of training camp, which was ultimately cancelled. The Tiger-Cats were scheduled to select eighth in each round with the number of rounds never announced.

== Planned schedule ==
=== Preseason ===
Week	Game	Date	Kickoff	Opponent	TV	Venue
A	Bye					
B	1	Thu, May 28	11:00 a.m. EDT	at Toronto Argonauts	NA	Varsity Stadium
C	2	Thu, June 4	7:30 p.m. EDT	vs. Ottawa Redblacks	NA	Tim Hortons Field

=== Regular season ===
Week	Game	Date	Kickoff	Opponent	TV	Venue
1	1	Sat, June 13	7:00 p.m. EDT	vs. Winnipeg Blue Bombers	TSN	Tim Hortons Field
2	2	Sat, June 20	7:00 p.m. EDT	at Toronto Argonauts	TSN	BMO Field
3	3	Thu, June 25	7:30 p.m. EDT	vs. Saskatchewan Roughriders	TSN	Tim Hortons Field
4	Bye					
5	4	Fri, July 10	7:30 p.m. EDT	vs. Calgary Stampeders	TSN	Tim Hortons Field
6	5	Sat, July 18	7:00 p.m. EDT	at Ottawa Redblacks	TSN	TD Place Stadium
7	6	Sat, July 25	7:00 p.m. EDT	at Calgary Stampeders	TSN	McMahon Stadium
8	7	Fri, July 31	9:30 p.m. EDT	at Edmonton Football Team	TSN	Commonwealth Stadium
9	8	Fri, Aug 7	7:30 p.m. EDT	vs. Montreal Alouettes	TSN/RDS	Tim Hortons Field
10	9	Sat, Aug 15	7:00 p.m. EDT	vs. Ottawa Redblacks	TSN	Tim Hortons Field
11	10	Sat, Aug 22	4:00 p.m. EDT	at Toronto Argonauts	TSN	BMO Field
12	11	Fri, Aug 28	10:00 p.m. EDT	at BC Lions	TSN	BC Place
13	12	Mon, Sept 7	1:00 p.m. EDT	vs. Toronto Argonauts	TSN	Tim Hortons Field
14	Bye					
15	13	Sat, Sept 19	7:00 p.m. EDT	at Winnipeg Blue Bombers	TSN	IG Field
16	14	Fri, Sept 25	7:00 p.m. EDT	vs. Montreal Alouettes	TSN/RDS	Tim Hortons Field
17	15	Sat, Oct 3	4:00 p.m. EDT	at Montreal Alouettes	TSN/RDS	Molson Stadium
18	Bye					
19	16	Sat, Oct 17	4:00 p.m. EDT	vs. Edmonton Football Team	TSN	Tim Hortons Field
20	17	Sat, Oct 24	7:00 p.m. EDT	at Saskatchewan Roughriders	TSN	Mosaic Stadium
21	18	Fri, Oct 30	7:00 p.m. EDT	vs. BC Lions	TSN	Tim Hortons Field

== Team ==
=== Roster ===
Hamilton Tiger-Cats roster
**Quarterbacks**: 9 Dane Evans; 8 Jeremiah Masoli; 3 Hayden Moore; 6 David Watford; **Receivers**: 80 Jaelon Acklin; 16 Brandon Banks WR/KR; -- Isaiah Burse; -- Dontez Byrd; -- Nehari Crawford; 18 Marcus Davis; -- Steven Dunbar; 89 Brian Jones; -- Jamire Jordan; 7 Jalin Marshall; -- Damoun Patterson; 88 DeVier Posey; 85 Justin Sumpter; 15 Marcus Tucker; 83 David Ungerer; -- Papi White	**Running backs**: 29 Jackson Bennett; -- Jordan Ellis; 20 Maleek Irons; 5 Don Jackson; 84 Nikola Kalinic FB; -- Branden Oliver; 31 Sean Thomas Erlington; **Offensive linemen**: 60 Darius Ciraco; 51 Mike Filer; 67 Jesse Gibbon; 65 Brett Golding; 55 Sheriden Lawley; 59 Kay Okafor; -- Justice Powers; 57 Brandon Revenberg; 66 Trevon Tate; 50 Joel Van Pelt; 54 Chris Van Zeyl	**Defensive linemen**: 96 Yurik Bethune DE; -- Ronheen Brigham; -- Malcolm Campbell DE; -- Koron Crump DE; 56 Ja'Gared Davis DE; 99 David Dean DT; -- Derek Dufault DE; 77 Valentin Gnahoua DE; 95 Julian Howsare DE; 97 Ted Laurent DT; 94 Lorenzo Mauldin DE; -- Johnny Robinson DT; -- Quindarius Thagard DT; 58 Brett Wade DT; -- Eddy Wilson DT; 98 Dylan Wynn DT; **Linebackers**: -- Jeff Allison; 28 Tyrice Beverette; 11 Larry Dean; 23 Chris Frey; 34 Koron Crump; 45 Justin Herdman-Reed; 40 Lucas Korol; 21 Simoni Lawrence; -- Joe Powell; 44 Curtis Newton; -- Kyle Wilson; -- Anthony Wint; -- Bailey Feltmate	**Defensive backs**: 2 Tunde Adeleke; 24 Delvin Breaux; 26 Cariel Brooks; -- Brandon Bryant; 13 Maurice Carnell; 35 Mike Daly; -- Jomon Dotson; 14 Qudarius Ford; 4 Patrick Levels; -- Josh Lewis; 0 Rico Murray; -- Tyree Robinson; 25 Jumal Rolle; 22 Courtney Stephen; -- Channing Stribling; 1 Frankie Williams DB/KR; **Special teams**: -- Matthew White K; 52 Aaron Crawford LS; 42 Gordon Whyte LS; Italics indicate American player **Bold** indicates global player Roster 2020-08-23; Depth Chart • Transactions; 85 Roster → More rosters

=== Coaching staff ===
Hamilton Tiger-Cats staff
**Front office**: Caretaker – Bob Young; Chief executive officer – Scott Mitchell; President and chief operating officer – Matt Afinec; Sr. Director of Personnel & Co-Manager of Football Operations – Drew Allemang; Sr. Director of Personnel & Co-Manager of Football Operations – Shawn Burke; Director of U.S. Scouting – Spencer Zimmerman; Football operations consultant – Jim Barker; Coordinator, U.S. Scouting – Rich Massaro; Coordinator, Canadian Scouting – Spencer Boehm; Video co-ordinator – Matt Allemang; **Head coach**: Head coach – Orlondo Steinauer; **Offensive coaches**: Offensive Coordinator & Quarterbacks – Tommy Condell; Offensive line – Mike Gibson; Running backs – D. J. Harper; Wide receivers – Jarryd Baines; Offensive assistant – Jim Barker	**Defensive coaches**: Defensive coordinator – Mark Washington; Defensive line – Randy Melvin; Linebackers – Robin Ross; Defensive backs – Craig Butler; **Special teams coaches**: Special teams coordinator – Jeff Reinebold; Special teams assistant – Craig Butler; Special teams assistant – Jim Barker; → Coaching staff
