= 2018 Hamilton Tiger-Cats season =

Season of Canadian Football League team the Hamilton Tiger-Cats

- General manager: Eric Tillman
- Head coach: June Jones
- Home stadium: Tim Hortons Field

Results
- Record: 8–10
- Division place: 2nd, East
- Playoffs: Lost East Final
- Team MOP: Jeremiah Masoli
- Team MOC: Ted Laurent
- Team MOR: Darius Ciraco

Uniform

The 2018 Hamilton Tiger-Cats season was the 61st season for the team in the Canadian Football League (CFL) and their 69th overall. The Tiger-Cats improved upon their 6–12 record from 2017 and clinched a playoff berth and home playoff date during their bye in week 17 following the Montreal Alouettes' loss to the Calgary Stampeders. After defeating the BC Lions in the East Semi-Final, the Tiger-Cats lost to the Ottawa Redblacks in the East Final. This was the third season under general manager Eric Tillman and first full season under head coach June Jones following his interim role the year before.

== Offseason ==
=== Notable signings ===
During the offseason, the Tiger-Cats signed controversial free agent quarterback Johnny Manziel, who played two seasons with the Cleveland Browns in the National Football League (NFL) before being released in 2015 for incidents on and off the field. The Manziel signing was part of a tumultuous negotiation process that lasted over a year.

=== CFL draft ===
The 2018 CFL draft took place on May 3, 2018. The Tiger-Cats held the first overall draft pick following a trade with the Montreal Alouettes and selected wide receiver Mark Chapman with that pick. This was the first time since the 2013 CFL draft that they selected first overall. In total, the team had nine selections in the eight-round draft, including four picks in the first 15 selections after trading John Chick to the Edmonton Eskimos and Zach Collaros to the Saskatchewan Roughriders.

Round	Pick	Player	Position	School/Club team
1	1	Mark Chapman	WR	Central Michigan
1	6	Darius Ciraco	OL	Calgary
2	11	Jackson Bennett	DB	Ottawa
2	15	Brett Wade	DL	Calgary
4	31	Marcus Davis	WR	British Columbia
5	37	Justin Buren	WR	Simon Fraser
6	44	Michael Moore	LB	Queen's
8	62	Joel Van Pelt	DL	Calgary
8	66	Nicholas Parisotto	DB	Guelph

== Preseason ==
=== Schedule ===
Week	Date	Kickoff	Opponent	Results		TV	Venue	Attendance	Summary
Week	Date	Kickoff	Opponent	Score	Record	TV	Venue	Attendance	Summary
A	Bye								
B	Fri, June 1	7:30 p.m. EDT	Toronto Argonauts	L 18–36	0–1	TSN	Tim Hortons Field	NA	Recap
C	Sat, June 9	12:00 p.m. EDT	@ Montreal Alouettes	W 30–15	1–1	TSN/RDS	Molson Stadium	12,325	Recap

=== Game summaries ===
==== Toronto ====
Preseason Week Two – Toronto at Hamilton

Quarter	1	2	3	4	Total
Argonauts	10	16	7	3	36
Tiger-Cats	0	6	7	5	18

at Tim Hortons Field • Hamilton, Ontario

- Date: Friday, June 1, 2018
- Game time: 7:30 p.m. EDT
- TV: TSN
- Source

Game information

First Quarter

- (8:01) Toronto FG: S. Waters 42-yard field goal
  Toronto 3–0
- (2:11) Toronto TD: C. Worthy 3-yard pass from M. Bethel-Thompson, R. Pfeffer kick
  Toronto 10–0

Second Quarter

- (12:10) Toronto FG: S. Waters 33-yard field goal
  Toronto 13–0
- (8:16) Hamilton TD: B. Banks 9-yard pass from J. Masoli, kick missed
  Toronto 13–6
- (0:51) Toronto TD: B. Burks 54-yard pass from M. Bethel-Thompson, R. Pfeffer kick
  Toronto 20–6
- (0:11) Toronto TD: M. Bethel-Thompson 1-yard rush, kick missed
  Toronto 26–6

Third Quarter

- (8:54) Toronto TD: J. Franklin 1-yard rush, S. Waters kick
  Toronto 33–6
- (0:00) Hamilton TD: F. Williams 74-yard punt return, L. Hajrullahu kick
  Toronto 33–13

Fourth Quarter

- (10:56) Hamilton FG: L. Hajrullahu 54-yard field goal
  Toronto 33–16
- (6:53) Toronto FG: S. Waters 32-yard field goal
  Toronto 36–16
- (0:52) Hamilton SFTY: Team loss of 5 yards, safety
  Toronto 36–18

Top Passers

- TOR – McLeod Bethel-Thompson: 9/11, 122 yards, 2 TD
- HAM – Jeremiah Masoli: 8/13, 115 yards, 1 TD, 2 INT

Top Rushers

- TOR – Greg Morris: 7 carries, 25 yards
- HAM – Mercer Timmis: 10 carries, 56 yards

Top Receiving

- TOR – Cole Watson: 3 receptions, 52 yards
- HAM – Brandon Banks: 4 receptions, 72 yards, 1 TD

==== At Montreal ====
Preseason Week Three – Hamilton at Montreal

Quarter	1	2	3	4	Total
Tiger-Cats	0	7	6	17	30
Alouettes	13	1	0	1	15

at Tim Hortons Field • Hamilton, Ontario

- Date: Saturday, June 9, 2018
- Game time: 12:00 p.m. EDT
- TV: TSN/RDS
- Source

== Regular season ==
=== Season standings ===
East Division
Team	GP	W	L	T	Pts	PF	PA	Div	Stk	
Ottawa Redblacks	18	11	7	0	22	464	420	6–2	W3	Details
Hamilton Tiger-Cats	18	8	10	0	16	513	456	4–4	L3	Details
Montreal Alouettes	18	5	13	0	10	345	512	4–4	W2	Details
Toronto Argonauts	18	4	14	0	8	369	560	2–6	L2	Details

=== Season schedule ===
Week	Game	Date	Kickoff	Opponent	Results		TV	Venue	Attendance	Summary
Week	Game	Date	Kickoff	Opponent	Score	Record	TV	Venue	Attendance	Summary
1	1	Sat, June 16	7:00 p.m. EDT	@ Calgary Stampeders	L 14–28	0–1	TSN/ESPN2	McMahon Stadium	23,717	Recap
2	2	Fri, June 22	10:00 p.m. EDT	@ Edmonton Eskimos	W 38–21	1–1	TSN	Commonwealth Stadium	31,334	Recap
3	3	Fri, June 29	7:00 p.m. EDT	Winnipeg Blue Bombers	W 31–17	2–1	TSN/RDS/ESPN2	Tim Hortons Field	23,721	Recap
4	4	Thurs, July 5	9:00 p.m. EDT	@ Saskatchewan Roughriders	L 13–18	2–2	TSN	Mosaic Stadium	30,594	Recap
5	Bye									
6	5	Thurs, July 19	7:30 p.m. EDT	Saskatchewan Roughriders	L 20–31	2–3	TSN/RDS	Tim Hortons Field	23,346	Recap
7	6	Sat, July 28	4:00 p.m. EDT	Ottawa Redblacks	L 15–21	2–4	TSN/RDS2/ESPN2	Tim Hortons Field	23,381	Recap
8	7	Fri, Aug 3	7:30 p.m. EDT	@ Montreal Alouettes	W 50–11	3–4	TSN/RDS/ESPN2	Molson Stadium	18,576	Recap
9	8	Fri, Aug 10	8:30 p.m. EDT	@ Winnipeg Blue Bombers	L 23–29	3–5	TSN/RDS	Investors Group Field	26,454	Recap
10	Bye									
11	9	Thu, Aug 23	7:30 p.m. EDT	Edmonton Eskimos	W 25–24	4–5	TSN/RDS	Tim Hortons Field	23,281	Recap
12	10	Mon, Sept 3	6:30 p.m. EDT	Toronto Argonauts	W 42–28	5–5	TSN	Tim Hortons Field	24,221	Recap
13	11	Sat, Sept 8	1:00 p.m. EDT	@ Toronto Argonauts	W 36–25	6–5	TSN	BMO Field	15,702	Recap
14	12	Sat, Sept 15	4:00 p.m. EDT	Calgary Stampeders	L 28–43	6–6	TSN/RDS	Tim Hortons Field	23,428	Recap
15	13	Sat, Sept 22	10:00 p.m. EDT	@ BC Lions	L 32–35 (2OT)	6–7	TSN	BC Place	18,794	Recap
16	14	Sat, Sept 29	4:00 p.m. EDT	BC Lions	W 40–10	7–7	TSN	Tim Hortons Field	23,623	Recap
17	Bye									
18	15	Fri, Oct 12	7:30 p.m. EDT	@ Toronto Argonauts	W 34–20	8–7	TSN	BMO Field	14,184	Recap
19	16	Fri, Oct 19	7:00 p.m. EDT	@ Ottawa Redblacks	L 31–35	8–8	TSN/RDS2	TD Place Stadium	23,534	Recap
20	17	Sat, Oct 27	4:00 p.m. EDT	Ottawa Redblacks	L 13–30	8–9	TSN/RDS	Tim Hortons Field	23,329	Recap
21	18	Sat, Nov 3	7:00 p.m. EDT	Montreal Alouettes	L 28–30	8–10	TSN/RDS	Tim Hortons Field	23,381	Recap

== Post-season ==
=== Schedule ===
Game	Date	Kickoff	Opponent	Results		TV	Venue	Attendance	Summary
Game	Date	Kickoff	Opponent	Score	Record	TV	Venue	Attendance	Summary
East Semi-Final	Sun, Nov 11	1:00 p.m. EST	BC Lions	W 48–8	1–0	TSN/RDS/ESPNews	Tim Hortons Field	23,911	Recap
East Final	Sun, Nov 18	1:00 p.m. EST	@ Ottawa Redblacks	L 27–46	1–1	TSN/RDS/ESPNews	TD Place Stadium	24,108	Recap

== Roster ==
Hamilton Tiger-Cats 2018 final roster
Quarterbacks: 9 Dane Evans; 8 Jeremiah Masoli; 18 Bryant Moniz; Running backs: 15 Alex Green; 31 Sean Thomas Erlington; 27 Mercer Timmis; 28 John White; Receivers: 86 Bralon Addison; 82 Justin Buren; 81 Felix Faubert-Lussier; 12 Mike Jones; 3 Marquay McDaniel; 14 Terrell Sinkfield; 17 Luke Tasker	Offensive linemen: 60 Darius Ciraco G; 51 Mike Filer C; 52 Mathieu Girard C; 61 Ryker Mathews T; 63 Kelvin Palmer T; 57 Brandon Revenberg G; 69 Landon Rice G/T; Defensive linemen: 94 Justin Capicciotti DE; 95 Julian Howsare DE; 97 Ted Laurent DT; 93 Connor McGough DE; 96 Jason Neill DT; 5 Adrian Tracy DE; 49 Nikita Whitlock DT/RB	Linebackers: 29 Jackson Bennett; 33 Terrell Davis; 11 Larry Dean; 21 Simoni Lawrence; 44 Curtis Newton; 1 Don Unamba; 43 Lucas Wacha; Defensive backs: 24 Delvin Breaux; 26 Cariel Brooks; 20 Mariel Cooper; 35 Mike Daly; 6 Josh Johnson; 30 Jay Langa; 4 Richard Leonard; 22 Courtney Stephen; 37 Frankie Williams	Special teams: 47 Aaron Crawford LS; 70 Lirim Hajrullahu K/P; Practice roster: 84 John Diarse WR; 69 Isame Faciane T; 42 Dillon Grondin LB; 85 Rashad Lawrence WR; 0 D. J. May LB; 36 Nicholas Parisotto DB; 91 Bobby Richardson DT	Injured list: 16 Brandon Banks WR; 7 Shamawd Chambers WR; 65 Brett Golding C; 19 John Green DB; 58 Avery Jordan T; 59 Kay Okafor T; 25 Jumal Rolle DB; 13 Jalen Saunders SB; 23 Nick Shortill LB; 80 Terrence Toliver WR; 92 Justin Vaughn DT; 90 Brett Wade DT; 55 Jamaal Westerman DE; 2 Chris Williams WR; 53 Everton Williams C/G; Italics indicate International player

== Coaching staff ==
Hamilton Tiger-Cats Staff
Front office: Caretaker – Bob Young; Chief executive officer – Scott Mitchell; President and Chief Operating Officer - Matt Afinec; General manager – Eric Tillman; Assistant gm/director of football operations – Shawn Burke; Assistant gm/director of canadian scouting – Drew Allemang; Consultant – Kent Austin; Scouting coordinator – Rich Massaro; Video co-ordinator – Matt Allemang; Head coach: Head coach – June Jones; Assistant head coach – Orlondo Steinauer; Offensive coaches: Assistant Offensive Coordinator & Running Backs – Corey Grant; Offensive line – Dennis McKnight; Quarterbacks – Dan Morrison; Assistant Wide Receivers & Offensive Quality Control – Jarryd Baines	Defensive coaches: Defensive coordinator – Jerry Glanville; Linebackers – Robert Lyles; Defensive line – Dennis McPhee; Defensive backs – William Fields; Defensive assistant – Craig Butler; Special teams coaches: Special teams coordinator – Frank Gansz Jr.; Special teams assistant – Craig Butler; → Coaching staff
