= 2020 Ottawa Redblacks season =

Cancelled Canadian football team season

- General manager: Marcel Desjardins
- Head coach: Paul LaPolice
- Home stadium: TD Place Stadium

Results
- Record: N/A
- Division place: N/A, East
- Playoffs: Season cancelled

The 2020 Ottawa Redblacks season was scheduled to be the seventh season for the team in the Canadian Football League (CFL). This would have been the first season for Paul LaPolice as the team's head coach and the seventh season with Marcel Desjardins as general manager.

Training camps, pre-season games, and regular season games were initially postponed due to the COVID-19 pandemic in Ottawa. The CFL announced on April 7, 2020 that the start of the 2020 season would not occur before July 2020. On May 20, 2020, it was announced that the league would likely not begin regular season play prior to September 2020. On August 17, 2020 however, the season was officially cancelled due to COVID-19.

== Offseason ==
=== Personnel changes ===
Three days following the conclusion of the 2019 season, on November 4, 2019, Rick Campbell announced that he was stepping down as head coach of the Redblacks. In a press conference, Campbell explained that he had become disappointed that several former players left the team feeling underappreciated and dejected and that he had a strained relationship with the team's general manager, Marcel Desjardins. Campbell left the Redblacks with a 44–62–2 record over six seasons with one Grey Cup championship in three appearances. He had one year remaining on his contract that OSEG agreed to pay out over five years.

On December 7, 2019, it was announced that Paul LaPolice had agreed to a three-year contract to become the head coach of the Ottawa Redblacks. He was most recently the offensive coordinator for the Winnipeg Blue Bombers from 2016 to 2019, including the 107th Grey Cup championship. He has also served as head coach of the Blue Bombers from 2010 to 2012 while compiling a 16–28 record.

== CFL national draft ==
The 2020 CFL National Draft took place on April 30, 2020. By virtue of recording the worst record in the league in 2019, the Redblacks had the first selection in each round, not including traded picks. After trading for the rights to Nick Arbuckle and re-signing him, the Redblacks swapped first-round picks with the Calgary Stampeders and also sent them a third-round pick. The team also gained a territorial selection after finishing in the bottom two of the previous year's standings.

Round	Pick	Player	Position	School	Hometown
1	6	Adam Auclair	DB	Laval	Quebec City, QC
2	10	Michael Hoecht	DL	Brown	Oakville, ON
2	19T	Dan Basambombo	LB	Laval	Ottawa, ON
4	29	Jakub Szott	OL	McMaster	Toronto, ON
5	38	Terrance Abrahams-Webster	DB	Calgary	Pickering, ON
6	47	Brad Cowan	LB	Wilfrid Laurier	Ashton, ON
7	56	Reshaan Davis	DL	Ottawa	Oshawa, ON
8	65	Kétel Assé	OL	Laval	Quebec City, QC

=== CFL global draft ===
The 2020 CFL global draft was scheduled to take place on April 16, 2020. However, due to the COVID-19 pandemic, this draft and its accompanying combine were postponed to occur just before the start of training camp, which was ultimately cancelled. The Redblacks were scheduled to select first in each round with the number of rounds never announced.

== Planned schedule ==
=== Preseason ===
Week	Game	Date	Kickoff	Opponent	TV	Venue
A	Bye					
B	1	Fri, May 29	7:30 p.m. EDT	vs. Montreal Alouettes	NA	TD Place Stadium
C	2	Thu, June 4	7:30 p.m. EDT	at Hamilton Tiger-Cats	NA	Tim Hortons Field

=== Regular season ===
The Redblacks had planned on hosting a number of themed home games during the season, one of which was scheduled to feature the unveiling of new red alternate jerseys July 24, 2020.

Week	Game	Date	Kickoff	Opponent	TV	Venue
1	1	Fri, June 12	7:00 p.m. EDT	vs. Toronto Argonauts	TSN	TD Place Stadium
2	2	Sat, June 20	10:00 p.m. EDT	at Edmonton Football Team	TSN	Commonwealth Stadium
3	Bye					
4	3	Thu, July 2	7:00 p.m. EDT	at Montreal Alouettes	TSN/RDS	Molson Stadium
5	4	Sat, July 11	10:00 p.m. EDT	at BC Lions	TSN	BC Place
6	5	Sat, July 18	7:00 p.m. EDT	vs. Hamilton Tiger-Cats	TSN	TD Place Stadium
7	6	Fri, July 24	7:00 p.m. EDT	vs. Edmonton Football Team	TSN	TD Place Stadium
8	7	Thu, July 30	9:00 p.m. EDT	at Saskatchewan Roughriders	TSN	Mosaic Stadium
9	8	Thu, Aug 6	7:30 p.m. EDT	vs. Winnipeg Blue Bombers	TSN	TD Place Stadium
10	9	Sat, Aug 15	7:00 p.m. EDT	at Hamilton Tiger-Cats	TSN	Tim Hortons Field
11	10	Fri, Aug 21	7:00 p.m. EDT	at Montreal Alouettes	TSN/RDS	Molson Stadium
12	11	Thu, Aug 27	8:30 p.m. EDT	at Winnipeg Blue Bombers	TSN	IG Field
13	12	Thu, Sept 3	7:30 p.m. EDT	vs. BC Lions	TSN	TD Place Stadium
14	13	Fri, Sept 11	7:30 p.m. EDT	vs. Montreal Alouettes	TSN/RDS	TD Place Stadium
15	14	Sat, Sept 19	4:00 p.m. EDT	at Toronto Argonauts	TSN	BMO Field
16	15	Sat, Sept 26	7:00 p.m. EDT	vs. Toronto Argonauts	TSN	TD Place Stadium
17	Bye					
18	16	Sat, Oct 10	4:00 p.m. EDT	vs. Saskatchewan Roughriders	TSN	TD Place Stadium
19	17	Fri, Oct 16	9:00 p.m. EDT	at Calgary Stampeders	TSN	McMahon Stadium
20	18	Fri, Oct 23	7:00 p.m. EDT	vs. Calgary Stampeders	TSN	TD Place Stadium
21	Bye					

== Team ==
=== Roster ===
Ottawa Redblacks roster
**Quarterbacks**: -- Kevin Anderson; 9 Nick Arbuckle; -- Taryn Christion; 4 Dominique Davis; **Running backs**: -- Anthony Coombs; 32 John Crockett; -- Timothy Flanders; -- Jarvion Franklin; 25 Brendan Gillanders; -- Akeem Hunt; -- Kenny Young III; **Receivers**: 14 Rafael Araujo-Lopes; 87 Jaelan Austin; 17 DeVonte Dedmon; -- Jovon Durante; 84 R.J. Harris; -- Justin Hobbs; 82 Wesley Lewis; -- Ervin Philips; -- Jalen Saunders; -- Cortrelle Simpson; 88 Brad Sinopoli; 83 Jerminic Smith; -- Shannon Smith; -- James Tyrell; 85 Guillermo Villalobos; -- Joe Walker; -- Malcolm Williams; 86 Micah Wright	**Fullbacks**: 89 Marco Dubois; 45 Anthony Gosselin; 22 Gabriel Polan; **Offensive linemen**: 68 Kai Absheer; -- KC Bakker; -- Tyler Catalina; 51 Alex Fontana; 64 Evan Johnson; 65 Mark Korte; 58 Jason Lauzon-Séguin; 66 Nolan MacMillan; 56 Alex Mateas; -- Jamar McGloster; 67 Daniel Omara; 57 Andrew Pickett; -- Na'ty Rodgers; -- Tanner Secord; 61 DeVondre Seymour; -- Darrell Williams Jr.	**Defensive linemen**: 78 Samson Abbott; -- Patrick Afriyie; -- Johnny Dwight; 98 Avery Ellis; -- Connor Flagel; 97 Thomas Grant; 91 Darius Jackson; 93 Shaneil Jenkins; -- Cleyon Laing; 76 Chris Larsen; 49 Ettore Lattanzio; -- Clement Lebreux; 95 Danny Mason; 99 Kene Onyeka; 47 Nigel Romick; 96 Michael Wakefield; -- Charles Williams; **Linebackers**: 31 Kevin Brown; 39 Mickael Côté; 35 Jerod Fernandez; 33 Denzel Johnson; -- Junior Joseph; 41 De'Andre Montgomery; -- Christophe Mulumba-Tshimanga; -- Dwayne Norman; 43 Shaheed Salmon; -- Don Unamba; 42 Avery Williams	**Defensive backs**: 27 Sherrod Baltimore; -- Kalon Beverly; 20 Jean-Philippe Bolduc; 38 Brandin Dandridge; -- Lashard Durr; 2 Randall Evans; 37 DeAndre Farris; -- Ironhead Gallon; 30 Nate Hamlin; 34 De'Chavon Hayes; 21 Justin Howell; -- David Jones; -- Jocquez Kalili; -- Abdul Kanneh; -- Dagogo Maxwell; -- Corey Moore; -- Brad Muhammad; 6 Antoine Pruneau; -- Delvon Randall; -- Marcus Roberson; 28 Corey Tindal; **Special teams**: 50 Louis-Philippe Bourassa LS; 70 Gabriel Ferraro K; 13 Richie Leone P; 16 José Maltos K/P; 10 Lewis Ward K; **Suspended**: 67 Colin Buchanan OL
Italics indicate American player • **Bold** indicates Global player • 104 Roster, 1 Suspended; Roster updated 2020-08-17 • Depth chart • Transactions

=== Coaching staff ===
Ottawa Redblacks staff
**Front office**: Owner – Ottawa Sports and Entertainment Group (OSEG); Chief executive officer – Mark Goudie; General manager – Marcel Desjardins; Assistant general manager – Jeremy Snyder; Director of player personnel – Jean-Marc Edmé; Coordinator of football operations – Joey Swarbrick; Video coordinator – Colin Farquharson; **Head coaches**: Head coach – Paul LaPolice; **Offensive coaches**: Receivers – Alex Suber; Offensive line – Bob Wylie; Quarterbacks – Steve Walsh; Running backs – Charlie Eger	**Defensive coaches**: Defensive coordinator – Mike Benevides; Defensive line – Carey Bailey; Linebackers – Chris Tormey; Defensive backs – Greg Knox; **Special teams coaches**: Special teams coordinator – Bob Dyce; Special Team & Defensive back Assistant – Patrick Bourgon; **Strength and conditioning**: Strength and conditioning coordinator – Nick Mercuri; → Coaching staff
