= 2020 Winnipeg Blue Bombers season =

Canadian football team season

- General manager: Kyle Walters
- Head coach: Mike O'Shea
- Home stadium: IG Field

Results
- Record: N/A
- Division place: N/A, West
- Playoffs: Season cancelled

Uniform
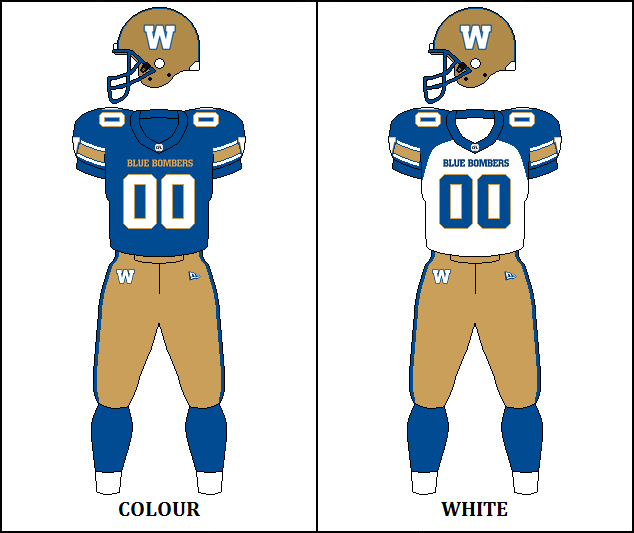

The 2020 Winnipeg Blue Bombers season was scheduled to be the 63rd season for the team in the Canadian Football League (CFL) and their 88th season overall. The Blue Bombers would have entered the season as the defending Grey Cup champions for the first time in 29 years, having ended the franchise's lengthy drought with the previous year's championship win in the 107th Grey Cup game. This would have been the seventh season under head coach Mike O'Shea and the seventh full season under general manager Kyle Walters.

Training camps, pre-season games, and regular season games were initially postponed due to the COVID-19 pandemic in Manitoba. The CFL announced on April 7, 2020 that the start of the 2020 season would not occur before July 2020. On May 20, 2020, it was announced that the league would likely not begin regular season play prior to September 2020. On August 17, 2020, however, the season was officially cancelled due to COVID-19.

== CFL national draft ==
The 2020 CFL National Draft took place on April 30, 2020. By virtue of finishing as Grey Cup champions in the previous season, the Blue Bombers selected last in each round of the eight-round draft, not including any traded picks. The team made one trade, acquiring Grey Cup starting quarterback, Zach Collaros, and a fifth-round pick from the Toronto Argonauts for the Blue Bombers' third-round pick and a conditional pick. The condition of that trade was whether Collaros re-signed with Winnipeg, which he did, meaning that the Blue Bombers sent their first-round selection to the Argonauts. On August 17 however, the season was officially cancelled due to COVID-19.

Round	Pick	Player	Position	University team	Hometown
2	18	Noah Hallett	DB	McMaster	London, ON
4	37	Brendan O′Leary-Orange	WR	Nevada	Toronto, ON
5	39	Marc Liegghio	K	Western	Woodbridge, ON
5	46	Nicholas Dheilly	DL	Saskatchewan	Regina, SK
6	55	Kyle Rodger	LB	Ottawa	Repentigny, QC
7	64	Tanner Cadwallader	LB	Wilfrid Laurier	Georgetown, ON
8	73	Bleska Kambamba	DB	Western	London, ON

=== CFL global draft ===
The 2020 CFL global draft was scheduled to take place on April 16, 2020. However, due to the COVID-19 pandemic, this draft and its accompanying combine were postponed to occur just before the start of training camp, which was ultimately cancelled. The Blue Bombers were scheduled to select ninth in each round with the number of rounds never announced.

== Planned schedule ==
=== Preseason ===
Week	Game	Date	Kickoff	Opponent	TV	Venue
A	1	Sun, May 24	3:00 p.m. CDT	vs. Edmonton Football Team	NA	IG Field
B	Bye					
C	2	Fri, June 5	8:30 p.m. CDT	at Saskatchewan Roughriders	NA	Mosaic Stadium

=== Regular season ===
Week	Game	Date	Kickoff	Opponent	TV	Venue
1	1	Sat, June 13	6:00 p.m. CDT	at Hamilton Tiger-Cats	TSN	Tim Hortons Field
2	Bye					
3	2	Fri, June 26	7:30 p.m. CDT	vs. Calgary Stampeders	TSN	IG Field
4	3	Fri, July 3	8:00 p.m. CDT	at Edmonton Football Team	TSN	Commonwealth Stadium
5	4	Thu, July 9	7:30 p.m. CDT	vs. Montreal Alouettes	TSN/RDS	IG Field
6	5	Thu, July 16	7:30 p.m. CDT	vs. BC Lions	TSN	IG Field
7	Bye					
8	6	Fri, July 31	6:00 p.m. CDT	at Toronto Argonauts	TSN	BMO Field
9	7	Thu, Aug 6	6:30 p.m. CDT	at Ottawa Redblacks	TSN	TD Place Stadium
10	8	Fri, Aug 14	7:30 p.m. CDT	vs. Edmonton Football Team	TSN	IG Field
11	9	Thu, Aug 20	8:00 p.m. CDT	at Calgary Stampeders	TSN	McMahon Stadium
12	10	Thu, July 27	7:30 p.m. CDT	vs. Ottawa Redblacks	TSN	IG Field
13	11	Sun, Sept 6	6:00 p.m. CDT	at Saskatchewan Roughriders	TSN	Mosaic Stadium
14	12	Sat, Sept 12	3:00 p.m. CDT	vs. Saskatchewan Roughriders	TSN	IG Field
15	13	Sat, Sept 19	6:00 p.m. CDT	vs. Hamilton Tiger-Cats	TSN	IG Field
16	14	Fri, Sept 25	8:30 p.m. CDT	at Calgary Stampeders	TSN	McMahon Stadium
17	Bye					
18	15	Fri, Oct 9	7:00 p.m. CDT	vs. Edmonton Football Team	TSN	IG Field
19	16	Sat, Oct 17	6:00 p.m. CDT	vs. Toronto Argonauts	TSN	IG Field
20	17	Fri, Oct 23	9:00 p.m. CDT	at BC Lions	TSN	BC Place
21	18	Sat, Oct 31	3:00 p.m. CDT	at Montreal Alouettes	TSN/RDS	Molson Stadium

== Team ==
=== Roster ===
Winnipeg Blue Bombers roster
**Quarterbacks**: -- Dru Brown; 8 Zach Collaros; 12 Sean McGuire; -- Dalton Sneed; **Receivers**: 1 Darvin Adams; -- Deontez Alexander; 88 Rasheed Bailey; -- Montay Crockett; 10 Nic Demski; 83 Julian Feoli-Gudino; 89 Kenny Lawler; -- Meckale McKay; 6 Charles Nelson; 81 Daniel Petermann; -- Kayaune Ross; -- Travis Rudolph; -- Alonzo Russell; -- ArDarius Stewart; 7 Lucky Whitehead; 82 Drew Wolitarsky	**Running backs**: 27 Johnny Augustine; -- Joshua Caldwell; 33 Andrew Harris; 20 Brady Oliveira; -- James Williams; **Fullbacks**: 24 Mike Miller; 32 John Rush; **Offensive linemen**: -- Jarell Broxton; 66 Stanley Bryant; -- Shane Carpenter; 59 Michael Couture; 61 Drew Desjarlais; 67 Asotui Eli; 68 Geoff Gray; 51 Jermarcus Hardrick; -- Chris Kolankowski; -- Kevin Lawrence; 53 Patrick Neufeld; -- Sepesitiano Pupungatoa; 62 Cody Speller; -- Nolan Ulizio	**Defensive linemen**: -- Tobi Antigha; -- Justin Alexandre; 3 Thiadric Hansen; 91 Connor Griffths; 94 Jackson Jeffcoat; 5 Willie Jefferson; 49 David Kenney; 97 Meffy Koloamatangi; -- Royce LaFrance; 90 Alex McCalister; 98 Steven Richardson; 95 Jake Thomas; **Linebackers**: -- Micah Awe; 4 Adam Bighill; 34 Jesse Briggs; 43 Brandon Calver; -- Dylan Donahue; 44 Shayne Gauthier; 52 Thomas Miles LB/LS; -- Mason Moe; -- Otha Peters; -- Jontrelle Rocquemore; 19 Kyrie Wilson	**Defensive backs**: 37 Brandon Alexander; -- Terrence Alexander; -- DeAundre Alford; -- Joshua Allen; -- Malik Boynton; -- Jhavonte Dean; -- Makinton Dorleant; -- Clifton Duck; 41 Kerfalla Exumé; -- Doran Grant; 21 Nick Hallett; -- Isaiah Johnson; -- Josh Johnson; 16 Mike Jones; -- Jamalcolm Liggins; -- Chris Lyles; 36 Mercy Maston; -- Dexter McDougle; -- Josh Miller; -- Damian Swann; 25 Nick Taylor; -- Ranthony Texada; -- Raekwon Williams; **Special teams**: 80 Janarion Grant KR/WR; 58 Maxime Latour LS; 9 Justin Medlock P/K; 46 Chad Rempel LS; -- Matt Riley K
Italics indicate American player • **Bold** indicates Global player • 92 Roster; Roster updated 2020-08-17 • Depth chart • Transactions

=== Coaching staff ===
Winnipeg Blue Bombers staff
**Front office**: Owner – None; Chairperson of the board of governors – Dayna Spiring; President/CEO – Wade Miller; General manager of football operations – Kyle Walters; Assistant General Manager / Director of U.S. Scouting – Danny McManus; Assistant general manager / director of player personnel – Ted Goveia; Director of football operations – Matt Gulakow; **Equipment staff**: Head equipment manager – Brad Fotty; Assistant equipment manager – Kevin Todd; Assistant equipment manager – Jared Cronk	**Head coaches**: Head coach – Mike O'Shea; **Offensive coaches**: Offensive coordinator and quarterbacks – Buck Pierce; Receivers – Kevin Bourgoin; Running backs – Pete Costanza; Offensive line – Marty Costello; **Defensive coaches**: Defensive coordinator – Richie Hall; Defensive line and linebackers – Glen Young; Defensive backs – Jordan Younger; Pass game analyst – James Stanley; **Special teams coaches**: Special teams coordinator – Paul Boudreau, Jr.; → Coaching staff
