= Michael Kashak =

Canadian football player (born 1993)

No. 99
- Position: Defensive lineman

Personal information
- Born: June 11, 1993 (age 33); Courtice, Ontario, Canada
- Listed height: 6 ft 0 in (1.83 m)
- Listed weight: 245 lb (111 kg)

Career information
- University: McMaster
- CFL draft: 2016: 6th round, 51st overall pick

Career history
- 2017–2018: Calgary Stampeders

Awards and highlights
- Grey Cup champion (2018)
- Stats at CFL.ca

Michael Kashak (born June 11, 1993) is a Canadian former professional football defensive lineman. He played college football for the McMaster Marauders in the Canadian Interuniversity Sport (CIS). He played five seasons for the Marauders which culminated in being named to the OUA first-team all-star team in 2015 and 2016. During these five seasons, the Marauders won the Yates Cup in 2012 and 2014. Following the end of the 2015 CIS season, he was invited to the Canadian Football League’s national combine. He was drafted in the sixth round, 51st overall, by the Calgary Stampeders in the 2016 CFL draft. Prior to playing football in the CIS, he played for Holy Trinity, where he was part of the Metro Bowl championship team in 2010.
