= Charles Vaillancourt =

Canadian football player (born 1992)

No. 69
- Position: Offensive lineman

Personal information
- Born: September 18, 1992 (age 34); Coaticook, Quebec, Canada
- Listed height: 6 ft 3 in (1.91 m)
- Listed weight: 329 lb (149 kg)

Career information
- University: Laval
- CFL draft: 2016: 1st round, 5th overall pick

Career history
- 2016–2018: BC Lions

Awards and highlights
- Vanier Cup champion (2012)
- Stats at CFL.ca

Charles Vaillancourt (born September 18, 1992) is a Canadian former professional football offensive lineman. He was selected in the first round and fifth overall by the Lions in the 2016 CFL draft and signed with the team on May 25, 2016. He played CIS football with the Laval Rouge et Or and won a Vanier Cup championship in 2012.
