= Anthony Thompson (defensive back) =

Canadian football player (born 1990)

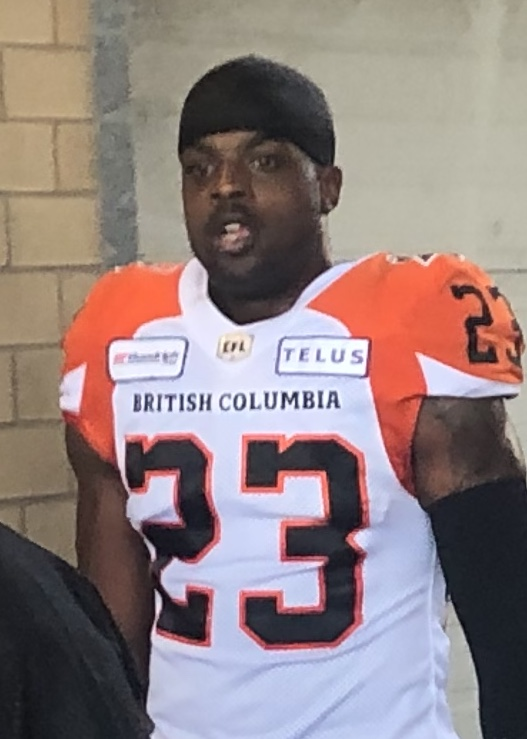
- Thompson with the BC Lions in 2019

No. 23
- Position: Defensive back

Personal information
- Born: March 23, 1990 (age 36); Montreal, Quebec, Canada
- Listed height: 6 ft 0 in (1.83 m)
- Listed weight: 205 lb (93 kg)

Career information
- College: Southern Illinois
- CFL draft: 2016: 2nd round, 12th overall pick

Career history
- 2016–2019, 2021: BC Lions
- Stats at CFL.ca

Anthony Thompson (born March 23, 1990) is a Canadian former professional football defensive back who played for the BC Lions of the Canadian Football League (CFL). He was drafted 12th overall in the 2016 CFL draft by the Lions. He played college football with the Southern Illinois Salukis.

== Professional career ==
Pre-draft measurables
Height	Weight	Arm length	Hand span	Wingspan	40-yard dash	10-yard split	20-yard split	20-yard shuttle	Three-cone drill	Vertical jump	Broad jump
6 ft 0 5/8 in (1.84 m)	204 lb (93 kg)	31 5/8 in (0.80 m)	8 7/8 in (0.23 m)	6 ft 3 7/8 in (1.93 m)	4.43 s	1.54 s	2.52 s	4.37 s	7.11 s	32.5 in (0.83 m)	9 ft 4 in (2.84 m)
All values from Pro Day

Thompson re-signed with the BC Lions on June 23, 2021. He became a free agent after the 2021 season.
