= Curtis Newton (Canadian football) =

Canadian football player (born 1994)

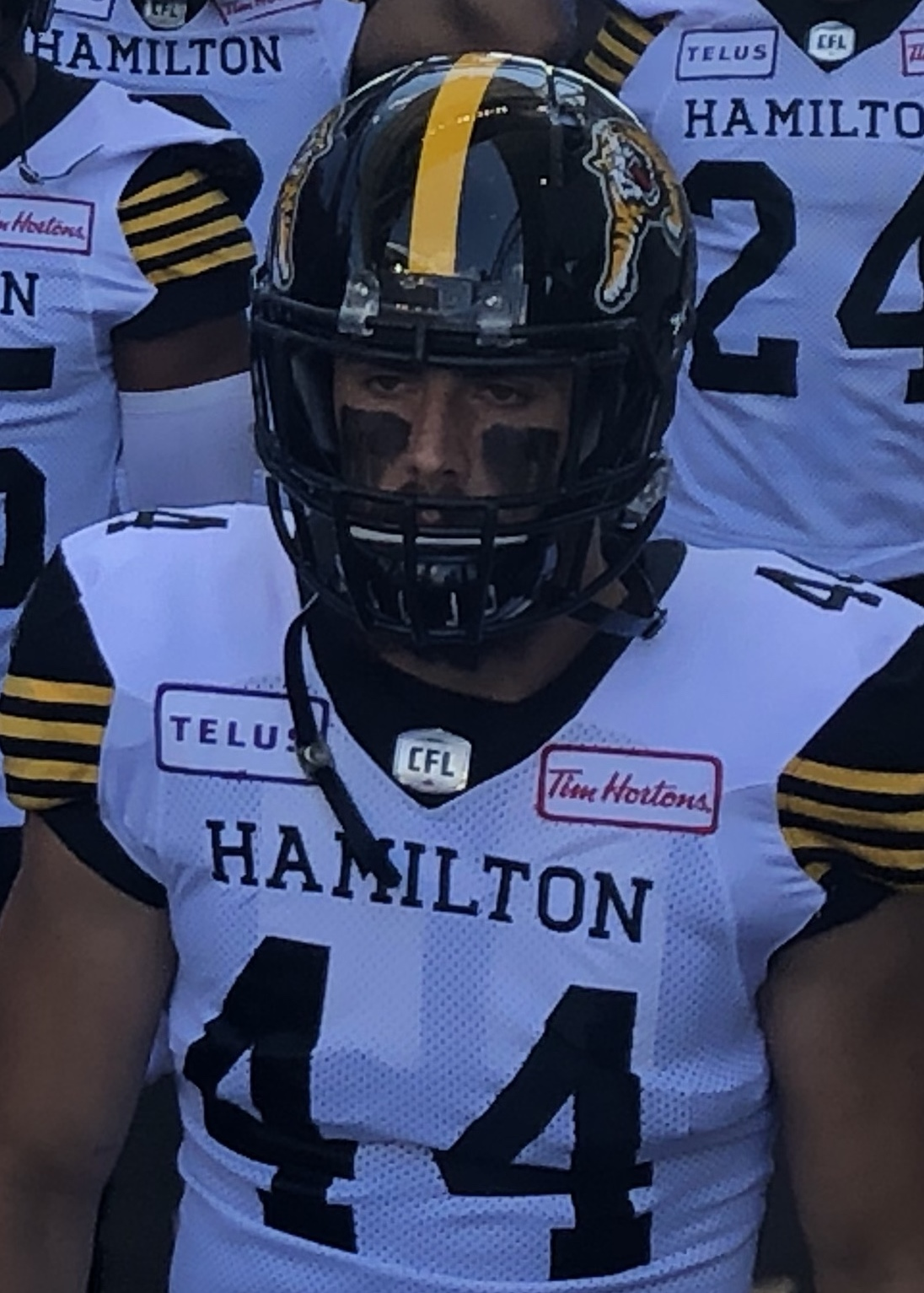
- Newton with the Hamilton Tiger-Cats in 2019

Profile
- Position: Linebacker

Personal information
- Born: July 24, 1994 (age 32); London, Ontario, Canada
- Listed height: 6 ft 2 in (1.88 m)
- Listed weight: 220 lb (100 kg)

Career information
- High school: A.B. Lucas Secondary
- University: Guelph
- CFL draft: 2016: 5th round, 40th overall pick

Career history
- 2016–2017: Toronto Argonauts
- 2017: Hamilton Tiger-Cats
- 2017: Toronto Argonauts
- 2018–2022: Hamilton Tiger-Cats
- Stats at CFL.ca

Curtis Newton (born July 24, 1994) is a Canadian professional football linebacker. He was a member of the 105th Grey Cup champion Toronto Argonauts. He played CIS football for the Guelph Gryphons.

== University career ==
Newton played Canadian Interuniversity Sport football for the Guelph Gryphons from 2012 to 2015. He was named an OUA All-Star and second-team CIS All-Canadian in 2014. In his fourth year in 2015, he was named a second-team OUA All-Star.

== Professional career ==
=== Toronto Argonauts (first stint) ===
Newton was drafted in the fifth round, 40th overall, in the 2016 CFL draft by the Toronto Argonauts and signed with the team on May 19, 2016. He played in his first professional game on June 30, 2016, and recorded his first special teams tackle in the same game. He finished the 2016 season with four special teams tackles in 16 games played. The following season, he played in the Argonauts' first two games, but was released on July 11, 2017.

=== Hamilton Tiger-Cats (first stint) ===
Newton signed with the Hamilton Tiger-Cats on July 25, 2017, and played in five games before again being released on October 4, 2017.

=== Toronto Argonauts (second stint) ===
He was then signed back to the Argonauts on October 5, 2017, and played in one game before finishing the season on Toronto's practice roster. Newton won his first Grey Cup championship as a member of the 105th Grey Cup champion Toronto Argonauts.

=== Hamilton Tiger-Cats (second stint) ===
After being released from his practice roster agreement with the Argonauts, Newton signed as a free agent with the Tiger-Cats on February 6, 2018. He played in all 18 regular season games in 2018, recording a career high 11 special teams tackles and two defensive tackles. He also recorded his first blocked punt on August 3, 2018, which was returned for a touchdown by teammate Sean Thomas Erlington. Newton also played in his first post-season games that year, recording three special teams tackles in two games. On January 15, 2020, The Tiger-Cats announced they had signed Newton to a contract extension. He signed another contract extension with the Tiger-Cats on December 29, 2020. On February 22, 2023, Newton became a free agent.
