= Juwan Brescacin =

Canadian gridiron football player (born 1993)

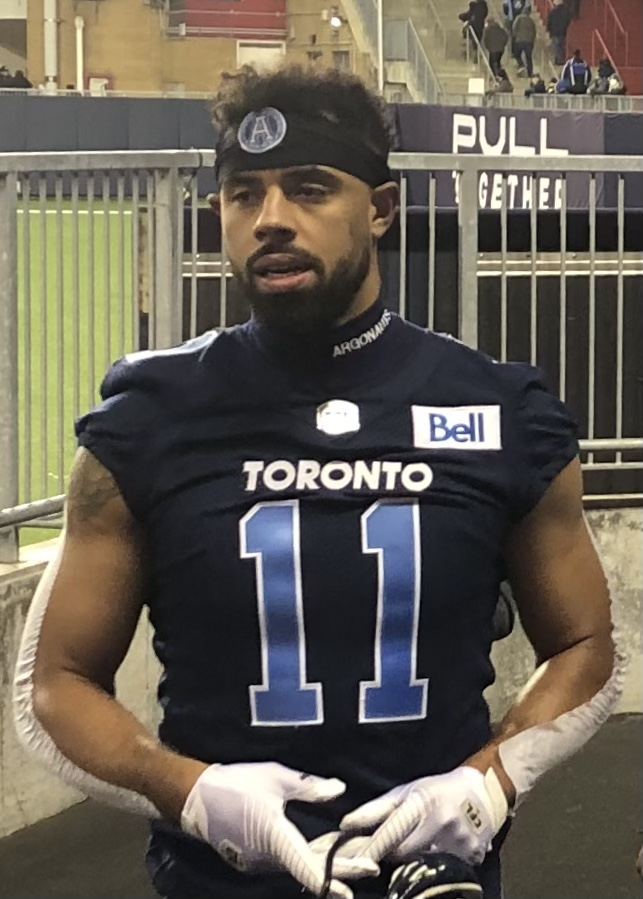
- Brescacin with the Toronto Argonauts in 2021

No. 11
- Position: Wide receiver

Personal information
- Born: January 10, 1993 (age 33); Mississauga, Ontario, Canada
- Listed height: 6 ft 3 in (1.91 m)
- Listed weight: 222 lb (101 kg)

Career information
- High school: Culver Academy
- College: Northern Illinois
- CFL draft: 2016: 2nd round, 15th overall pick

Career history
- 2016–2019: Calgary Stampeders
- 2020–2022: Toronto Argonauts
- 2023: Saskatchewan Roughriders

Awards and highlights
- 2× Grey Cup champion (2018, 2022)
- Stats at CFL.ca

Juwan Brescacin (born January 10, 1993) is a Canadian former professional football wide receiver. He played college football for the Northern Illinois Huskies.

== Professional career ==
=== Calgary Stampeders ===
Brescacin was drafted in the second round, 15th overall, in the 2016 CFL draft by the Calgary Stampeders and signed with the team on May 17, 2016. He made his professional regular season debut on July 1, 2016 against the Winnipeg Blue Bombers and recorded his first career reception in the next week's game against the Ottawa Redblacks on July 8, 2016. He finished his rookie season with four catches for 51 yards in seven regular season games. He also played in both postseason games, including his first Grey Cup game, which was an overtime loss to the Redblacks in the 104th Grey Cup game in his hometown of Toronto.

In 2017, Brescacin saw more playing time as he played in 15 regular season games, recording 19 receptions for 260 yards. He played in the West Final and the 105th Grey Cup where he caught four passes for 33 yards, but was once again on the losing end as the Stampeders were defeated by the Toronto Argonauts. Brescacin continued to establish himself in the league in 2018 by playing in all 18 regular season games and recording career highs with 35 receptions for 567 yards. He also scored his first professional touchdown in 2018 with a 10-yard reception from Bo Levi Mitchell against the Redblacks on July 12, 2018. Later that year, he had his first 100-yard receiving game in a match against the Hamilton Tiger-Cats on September 15, 2018. Once again, he played in both of the Stampeders' postseason games, including his third Grey Cup game in his third season. This year would prove triumphant as he recorded five catches for 35 yards in a Calgary win against the Ottawa Redblacks in the 106th Grey Cup game.

In the 2019 season, Brescacin continued his productive pace with 11 receptions for 168 yards and three touchdowns in four games. However, he suffered an injury during the Week 7 game against the Redblacks and remained on the six-game injured list for the rest of the season.

=== Toronto Argonauts ===
On February 11, 2020, Brescacin signed with the Toronto Argonauts. He re-signed with the Argonauts on January 13, 2021. In two seasons, he played in 11 regular season games where he had 11 receptions for 97 yards and two touchdowns. Brescacin became a free agent upon the expiry of his contract on February 14, 2023.

=== Saskatchewan Roughriders ===
On February 14, 2023, Brescacin signed with the Saskatchewan Roughriders. He played in eight games where he had seven catches for 53 yards. He became a free agent upon the expiry of his contract on February 13, 2024.
