= Josiah St. John =

Canadian football player (born 1992)

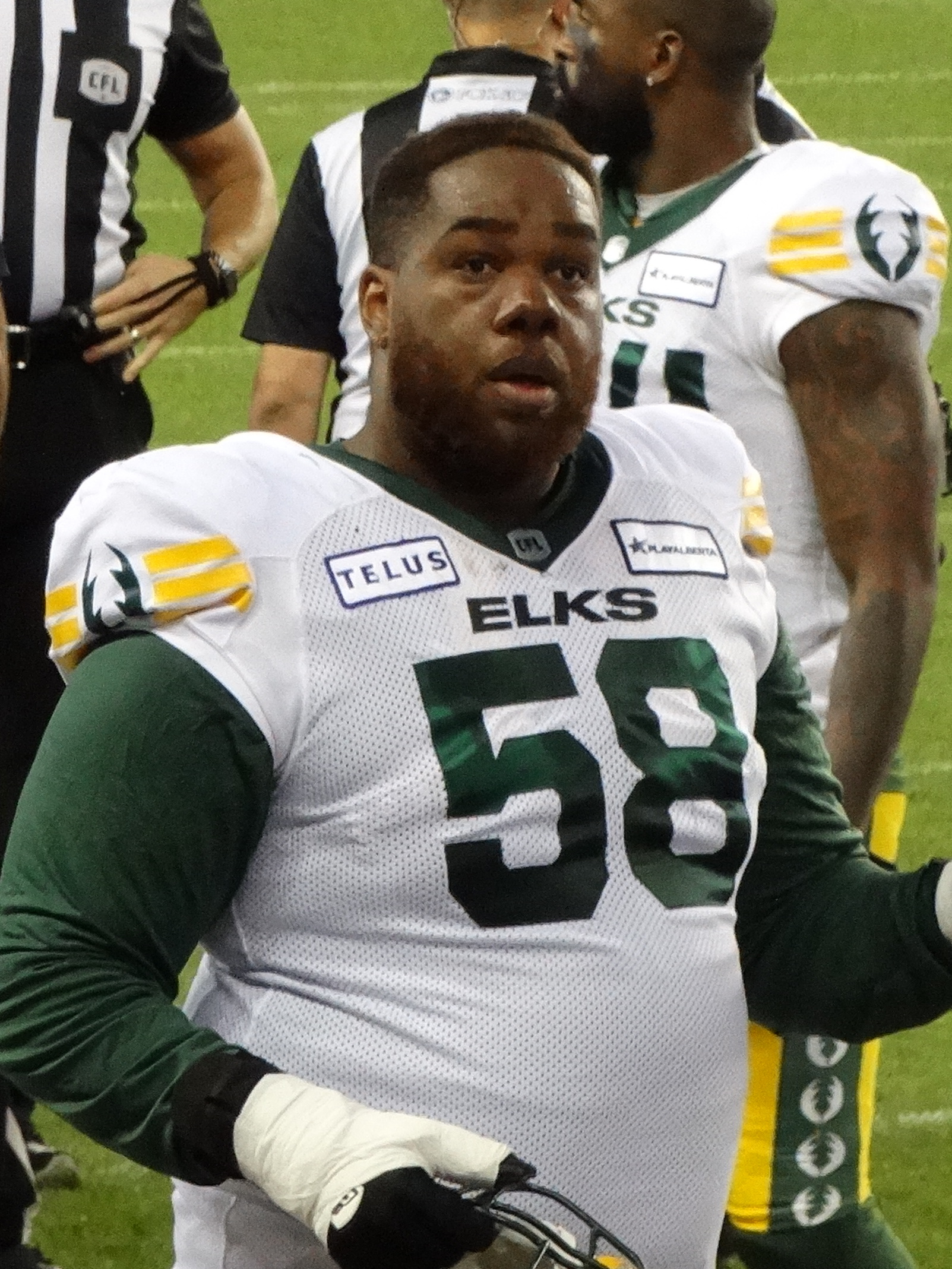
- St. John with the Edmonton Elks in 2023

Profile
- Position: Offensive tackle

Personal information
- Born: May 18, 1992 (age 34); Toronto, Ontario, Canada
- Listed height: 6 ft 5 in (1.96 m)
- Listed weight: 305 lb (138 kg)

Career information
- College: Oklahoma
- CFL draft: 2016: 1st round, 1st overall pick

Career history
- 2016–2018: Saskatchewan Roughriders
- 2019: BC Lions*
- 2019: Edmonton Eskimos
- 2020–2022: Saskatchewan Roughriders
- 2023: Edmonton Elks
- * Offseason or practice squad member only
- Stats at CFL.ca

Josiah St. John (born May 18, 1992) is a Canadian professional football offensive tackle. He played college football with the Oklahoma Sooners.

== Professional career ==
=== Saskatchewan Roughriders ===
St. John was ranked as the fifth best player available in the 2016 CFL draft by the CFL's Central Scouting Bureau. He was the first overall selection in the 2016 CFL draft by the Saskatchewan Roughriders, but he was in a contract dispute with the team at the start of the 2016 season. He finally signed with the team on July 4, 2016 after missing all of training camp and the Roughriders' first game of the season. Over three years with the Roughriders, he dressed in 22 games and started in eight (including six games started in his rookie year) before becoming a free agent in 2019.

=== Toronto Argonauts ===
On May 19, 2019, St. John signed with the Toronto Argonauts. He was part of the Argonauts' training camp cuts on June 7, 2019.

=== BC Lions ===
St. John signed a practice roster agreement with the BC Lions on September 9, 2019. He was released from the practice roster on November 1, 2019.

=== Edmonton Eskimos ===
On November 5, 2019, St. John was added to the practice roster of the Edmonton Eskimos. He dressed in the 2019 East Final for the team and became a free agent on February 11, 2020.

=== Saskatchewan Roughriders (second stint) ===
After becoming a free agent, St. John re-signed with the Saskatchewan Roughriders on February 12, 2020. He signed a one-year contract extension with the team on January 6, 2021.

=== Edmonton Elks (second stint) ===
St. John joined the Edmonton Elks as a free agent on February 14, 2023. He became a free agent upon the expiry of his contract on February 13, 2024.
