= Mehdi Abdesmad =

Canadian football player (born 1991)

No. 92
- Position: Defensive end

Personal information
- Born: September 28, 1991 (age 35); Montreal, Quebec, Canada
- Listed height: 6 ft 6 in (1.98 m)
- Listed weight: 284 lb (129 kg)

Career information
- High school: Cégep du Vieux Montréal
- College: Boston College (2011-2015)
- NFL draft: 2016: undrafted
- CFL draft: 2016: 3rd round, 25th overall pick

Career history
- Tennessee Titans (2016); Tampa Bay Buccaneers (2017)*
- * Offseason or practice squad member only

Career NFL statistics
- Total tackles: 1
- Sacks: 0
- Forced fumbles: 0
- Fumble recoveries: 0
- Stats at Pro Football Reference

Mehdi Abdesmad (born September 28, 1991) is a Canadian former professional football player who was a defensive end in the National Football League (NFL). He played college football for the Boston College Eagles.

== Professional career ==
=== Tennessee Titans ===
Abdesmad went undrafted in the 2016 NFL draft. He was signed by the Tennessee Titans on April 30, 2016. On September 4, 2016, he was released by the Titans and was signed to the practice squad the next day. He was promoted to the active roster on December 12, 2016. He was placed on injured reserve on December 28, 2016. As a rookie in 2016, he played two games making one tackle. He was waived on August 21, 2017.

=== Tampa Bay Buccaneers ===
On August 28, 2017, Abdesmad signed with the Tampa Bay Buccaneers. He was waived on September 2, 2017.
