= Mercer Timmis =

Canadian football player (born 1994)

Profile
- Position: Running back

Personal information
- Born: January 19, 1994 (age 32); Burlington, Ontario, Canada
- Listed height: 6 ft 2 in (1.88 m)
- Listed weight: 220 lb (100 kg)

Career information
- High school: Canisius High School
- University: Calgary
- CFL draft: 2016: 2nd round, 14th overall pick

Career history
- 2016–2018: Hamilton Tiger-Cats
- 2019: Toronto Argonauts*
- * Offseason or practice squad member only
- Stats at CFL.ca

Mercer Edward Timmis (born January 19, 1994) is a Canadian former professional football running back in the Canadian Football League (CFL). He was drafted in the second round, 14th overall by the Hamilton Tiger-Cats in the 2016 CFL draft and played three seasons for the team before finishing his career with the Toronto Argonauts. He played CIS football for the Calgary Dinos. Timmis graduated from the Haskayne School of Business in 2018 and has since returned to the University of Calgary to pursue a Juris Doctor from the University of Calgary Faculty of Law.

== University career ==
Timmis played CIS football for the Calgary Dinos from 2012 to 2015. In 2013, he broke the Canada West record for rushing touchdowns in a season (18), total touchdowns in a season (19), and was named the Canada West MVP. He scored the most touchdowns in Dinos history and was a three-time CIS first team All-Canadian. After the 2015 CIS season, he was ranked as the seventh best player in the Canadian Football League’s Amateur Scouting Bureau December rankings for players eligible in the 2016 CFL draft and third by players in Canadian Interuniversity Sport.

=== University statistics ===
| Mercer Timmis | | | Rushing | | | | | Receiving | | |
| Year | Team | GP | Att | Yards | Avg | Long | TDs | Rec | Yards | TDs |
|---|---|---|---|---|---|---|---|---|---|---|
| 2012 | Calgary | 8 | 42 | 360 | 8.6 | 45 | 6 | 5 | 45 | 0 |
| 2013 | Calgary | 8 | 167 | 1157 | 6.9 | 80 | 18 | 7 | 100 | 1 |
| 2014 | Calgary | 7 | 103 | 801 | 7.8 | 48 | 8 | 7 | 72 | 1 |
| 2015 | Calgary | 6 | 80 | 666 | 8.3 | 80 | 10 | 9 | 104 | 0 |
| University Totals | | 29 | 392 | 2984 | 7.6 | 80 | 42 | 28 | 321 | 2 |

== Professional career ==
Timmis was drafted 14th overall by his hometown Hamilton Tiger-Cats in the 2016 CFL Draft, but attended mini-camp with the National Football League's Carolina Panthers and New York Giants prior to signing with the Tiger-Cats. He made his CFL debut on August 20, 2016 versus the Saskatchewan Roughriders and played in nine regular season games and one playoff game that year. He played in the first nine games in 2017 before suffering a season-ending injury in the Labour Day Classic on September 4, 2018.

He began to see more regular play in 2018 while the incumbent starting running back, Alex Green, recovered from injury. Timmis scored his first career professional touchdown on June 22, 2018 while playing the Edmonton Eskimos as well as recording his first professional 100-yard rushing game with 17 carries for 133 yards. Timmis finished the 2018 season with 44 carries for 205 rushing yards and four touchdowns, as well as catching two passes and returning four kickoffs. In two playoff games, Timmis' one touch was a 25 yard rush in the Eastern Semi-Final.

On the first day of Free Agency in 2019, Timmis signed a contract with Hamilton's division rival Toronto Argonauts. However, he opened the 2019 Toronto Argonauts season on the six-game injured list and abruptly retired shortly after the first game of the season on June 25, 2019.

== Personal life ==
Timmis' parents are Brian III and Jennifer and he has a brother, Brian IV and a sister Taylor. His great-grandfather, Brian Timmis, played for 17 years for the Regina Rugby Club, Ottawa Rough Riders, and Hamilton Tigers and was an inaugural member of the Canadian Football Hall of Fame. His grandfather, Brian Timmis II, played for one season with the Saskatchewan Roughriders in 1953.
