= Dillon Guy =

Canadian football player (born 1991)

No. 50
- Position: Offensive lineman

Personal information
- Born: July 16, 1991 (age 35); Hamilton, Ontario, Canada
- Listed height: 6 ft 4 in (1.93 m)
- Listed weight: 315 lb (143 kg)

Career information
- High school: Waterdown District HS
- College: Buffalo
- CFL draft: 2016: 4th round, 30th overall pick

Career history
- 2016: BC Lions*
- 2016–2017: Saskatchewan Roughriders*
- 2017: Calgary Stampeders*
- 2018: Ottawa Redblacks*
- 2018: Montreal Alouettes
- * Offseason or practice squad member only
- Stats at CFL.ca

Dillon Guy (born July 16, 1991) is a Canadian former professional football offensive lineman. He played college football at the University at Buffalo and attended Waterdown District High School in Waterdown, Ontario. Guy was drafted with the 30th overall pick in the 2016 CFL draft by the BC Lions. After being cut by the Lions prior to the start of the 2016 CFL season, Guy spent the 2016, 2017, and part of the 2018 seasons on the practice squads of the Saskatchewan Roughriders, Calgary Stampeders, and Ottawa Redblacks. On October 18, 2018, Guy was signed by the Montreal Alouettes, and on October 20, 2018, Guy made his CFL debut against the Toronto Argonauts.
