= Jason Lauzon-Séguin =

Canadian football player (born 1990)

Profile
- Position: Offensive lineman

Personal information
- Born: November 27, 1990 (age 35); Pointe-Claire, Quebec, Canada
- Listed height: 6 ft 4 in (1.93 m)
- Listed weight: 300 lb (136 kg)

Career information
- University: Laval
- CFL draft: 2016: 1st round, 7th overall pick

Career history
- 2016–2020: Ottawa Redblacks
- 2021: Montreal Alouettes*
- * Offseason or practice squad member only

Awards and highlights
- Grey Cup champion (2016); Frank M. Gibson Trophy (2016); CFL East All-Star (2017)
- Stats at CFL.ca

Jason Lauzon-Séguin (born November 27, 1990) is a Canadian former professional football offensive lineman. He played CIS football with the Laval Rouge et Or.

== Professional career ==
=== Ottawa Redblacks ===
Lauzon-Séguin was drafted by the Ottawa Redblacks with the seventh overall pick in the 2016 CFL draft. He dressed for his first professional regular season game on June 25, 2016 against the Edmonton Eskimos and played in 14 regular season games in his rookie year. He also played in the Redblacks' 104th Grey Cup championship win that year over the Calgary Stampeders. In total, Lauzon-Séguin played in four seasons for Ottawa, dressing in 54 regular season games and two Grey Cups. He did not play in 2020 due to the cancellation of the 2020 CFL season. He became a free agent in 2021.

=== Montreal Alouettes ===
On February 10, 2021, it was announced that Lauzon-Séguin had signed with the Montreal Alouettes. He was placed on the suspended list on July 6, 2021, and retired from professional football on July 11.
