= Brett Wade =

Canadian football player (born 1993)

No. 58
- Position: Defensive lineman

Personal information
- Born: June 24, 1993 (age 33); Regina, Saskatchewan, Canada
- Listed height: 6 ft 1 in (1.85 m)
- Listed weight: 270 lb (122 kg)

Career information
- High school: Miller Comprehensive
- CJFL: Regina Thunder
- University: Calgary
- CFL draft: 2018: 2nd round, 15th overall pick

Career history
- 2018–2020: Hamilton Tiger-Cats
- Stats at CFL.ca

Brett David Wade (born June 24, 1993) is a Canadian former professional football defensive lineman. He played U Sports football for the Calgary Dinos and played in the CJFL for the Regina Thunder.

== Professional career ==
Pre-draft measurables
Height	Weight	20-yard shuttle	Three-cone drill	Vertical jump	Broad jump	Bench press
6 ft 1 in (1.85 m)	270 lb (122 kg)	4.66 s	8.05 s	26.5 in (0.67 m)	8 ft 7 1/2 in (2.63 m)	21 reps
All values from CFL Combine

Wade was drafted by the Hamilton Tiger-Cats in the second round, 15th overall, in the 2018 CFL draft and signed with the team on May 20, 2018. He played in his first professional game on August 10, 2018 against the Winnipeg Blue Bombers. He recorded both his first defensive tackle and first quarterback sack against the BC Lions on September 29, 2018. He finished the 2018 season with one tackle and one sack in five games played.

Wade re-signed with the Tiger-Cats on January 22, 2021. He retired from football on June 29, 2021.
