= Michael Couture =

Canadian gridiron football player (born 1994)

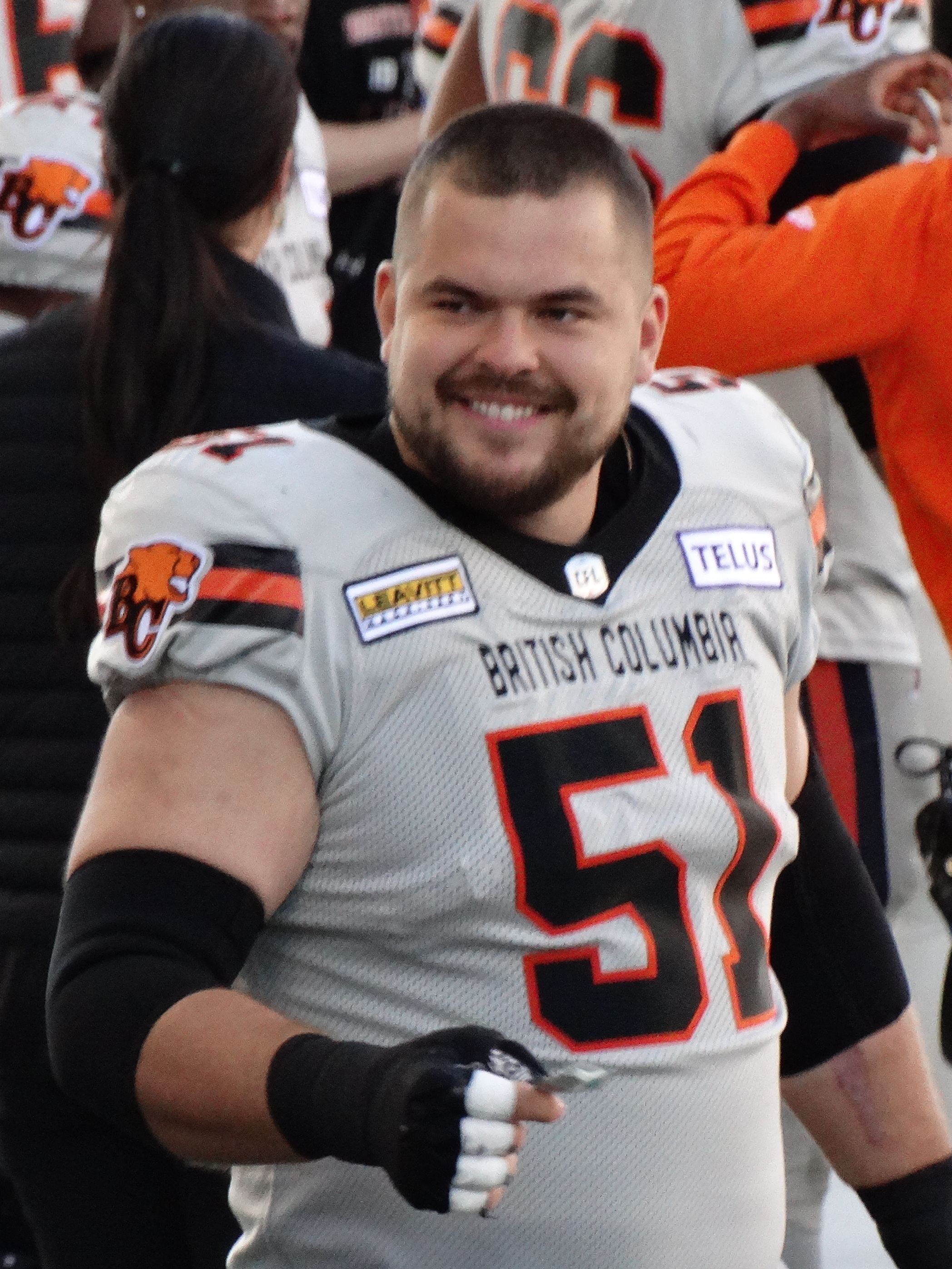
- Couture with the BC Lions in 2024

No. 51 – BC Lions
- Position: Offensive lineman
- Roster status: Active
- CFL status: National

Personal information
- Born: February 7, 1994 (age 32); Burnaby, British Columbia, Canada
- Listed height: 6 ft 4 in (1.93 m)
- Listed weight: 302 lb (137 kg)

Career information
- High school: Centennial Secondary
- College: Simon Fraser
- CFL draft: 2016: 2nd round, 10th overall pick

Career history
- 2016–2022: Winnipeg Blue Bombers
- 2023–present: BC Lions

Awards and highlights
- 2× Grey Cup champion (2019, 2021)
- Stats at CFL.ca

Michael Couture (born February 7, 1994) is a Canadian professional football offensive lineman for the BC Lions of the Canadian Football League (CFL).

== University career ==
Couture played college football for the Simon Fraser Clan from 2012 to 2015.

== Professional career ==
=== Winnipeg Blue Bombers ===
He was selected by the Winnipeg Blue Bombers with the tenth overall pick in the 2016 CFL draft and signed with the club on May 21, 2016. He made the active roster following training camp and played in his first professional game on June 24, 2016, against the Montreal Alouettes. Couture played in all 18 regular season games in 2016 and made his post-season debut that year in the West Semi-Final against the BC Lions. In 2017, he again played in all 18 regular season games and, in 2018, he made his first professional start on September 8, 2018, against the Saskatchewan Roughriders in the Banjo Bowl.

In 2019, Couture became the team's starting centre and started in all 18 regular season games. However, he was injured in the final regular season game and missed the team's playoff run that culminated in a 107th Grey Cup victory. He returned in 2021, where he started all 14 regular season games and started in the 108th Grey Cup where the Blue Bombers repeated as champions following their overtime win over the Hamilton Tiger-Cats.

Couture missed the first regular season games of his career in 2022 as he suffered an arm injury and played in just seven games. However, he was healthy near the end of the season and contributed to the team's playoff run which ended in a defeat by the Toronto Argonauts in the 109th Grey Cup game. He became a free agent upon the expiry of his contract on February 14, 2023.

=== BC Lions ===
On February 14, 2023, it was announced that Couture had signed with the BC Lions to a two-year contract. He played and started in all 18 regular season games in 2023 and also started in both of the Lions' playoff games that year. On July 13, 2025, Couture was placed on the Lions' 6-game injured list after suffering an injury during the previous week's game against the Montreal Alouettes. He rejoined the active roster on September 4, 2025. On December 3, 2025, Couture re-signed with the Lions, on a two-year contract extension.
