= D. J. Lalama =

Canadian gridiron football player and coach (born 1993)

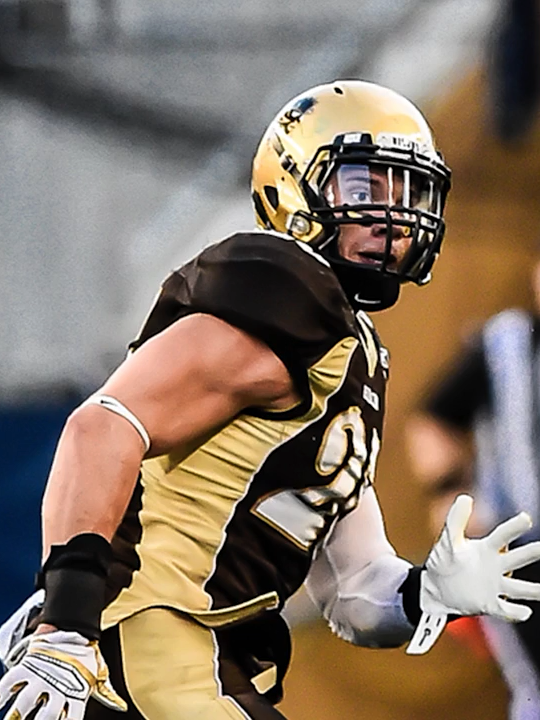
- Lalama with Manitoba in 2016

Manitoba Bisons
- Title: Linebackers coach

Personal information
- Born: July 21, 1993 (age 33); Winnipeg, Manitoba, Canada
- Listed height: 6 ft 0 in (1.83 m)
- Listed weight: 222 lb (101 kg)

Career information
- Position: Linebacker
- High school: St. Paul's
- University: Manitoba
- CFL draft: 2016: 8th round, 70th overall pick

Career history

Playing
- 2016: Edmonton Eskimos*
- 2017–2018: Montreal Alouettes
- 2019: Winnipeg Blue Bombers
- 2019–2021: Montreal Alouettes
- 2022: Calgary Stampeders*
- * Offseason or practice squad member only

Coaching
- 2021: Manitoba Bisons (Special teams assistant)
- 2022–present: Manitoba Bisons (Linebackers coach)

Awards and highlights
- 2016 Presidents' Trophy
- Stats at CFL.ca

D. J. Lalama (born July 21, 1993) is a Canadian former professional football linebacker and is the linebackers coach for the Manitoba Bisons football team of U Sports.

== University career ==
Lalama began his CIS football career with the Western Mustangs in 2011, but did not play and used a redshirt year. Following the departure of coach Mickey Donovan, he transferred to the Manitoba Bisons program, playing in one game in 2012 before suffering a season ending injury. He played his first full university season in 2013 and played three years en route to being drafted into the Canadian Football League in 2016. He was on the Edmonton Eskimos' practice roster when he requested his release so that he could complete a Master of Business Administration at the University of Manitoba.

During his final university season in 2016, Lalama led the entire country with 72.5 total tackles and 54 solo tackles and also had three forced fumbles and seven pass breakups. For his strong season, he was named the Presidents' Trophy winner and became only the second Bison to win the national award.

== Professional career ==
=== Edmonton Eskimos ===
Lalama was drafted with in the eighth round, 70th overall, by the Edmonton Eskimos in the 2016 CFL draft. He initially agreed to a practice roster spot following 2016 training camp, but elected to return to the play for the Bisons and complete his MBA.

Following the conclusion of his U Sports football career, Lalama re-signed with the Eskimos on February 13, 2017. However, he was among the final cuts on June 18, 2017, at the conclusion of 2017 training camp.

=== Montreal Alouettes ===
On July 5, 2017, it was announced that Lalama had signed a practice roster agreement with the Montreal Alouettes. He was promoted to the active roster and played in his first professional football game on July 14, 2017, against the Calgary Stampeders. For the 2017 season, he played in 15 regular season games and recorded 10 special teams tackles. He missed the entire 2018 season after suffering a shoulder injury during 2018 training camp.

=== Winnipeg Blue Bombers ===
Upon becoming a free agent, Lalama signed with his hometown Winnipeg Blue Bombers on February 15, 2019. He played in the first seven games of the 2019 Winnipeg Blue Bombers season and recorded one special teams tackle before being a healthy scratch in the eighth game. He declined a practice roster spot with the team and became a free agent on August 14, 2019.

=== Montreal Alouettes (II) ===
Shortly after his Blue Bombers release, Lalama was re-signed by the Alouettes on August 15, 2019. He played in 11 regular season games, including starting in two at the end of the season for the playoff-bound team. For the last game of the 2019 regular season against the Ottawa Redblacks, he was named a CFL Top Performer for the week after he recorded a career-high 10 defensive tackles, one sack, and one special teams tackle. In the game, he also served as the team's long snapper following an injury to the team's incumbent, Martin Bédard. Following the end of the season, Lalama signed a one-year contract extension with the Alouettes. He re-signed with the Alouettes again on January 20, 2021. He was placed on the suspended list on July 6, 2021.

=== Calgary Stampeders ===
On February 9, 2022, Lalama signed with the Calgary Stampeders, but retired prior to the 2022 season.

== Coaching career ==
While sitting out the 2021 CFL season, Lalama coached for the Manitoba Bisons as a special teams assistant. On June 6, 2022, it was announced that Lalama had been promoted and would be the team's linebackers coach.
