= Jean-Philippe Bolduc =

Canadian football player (born 1990)

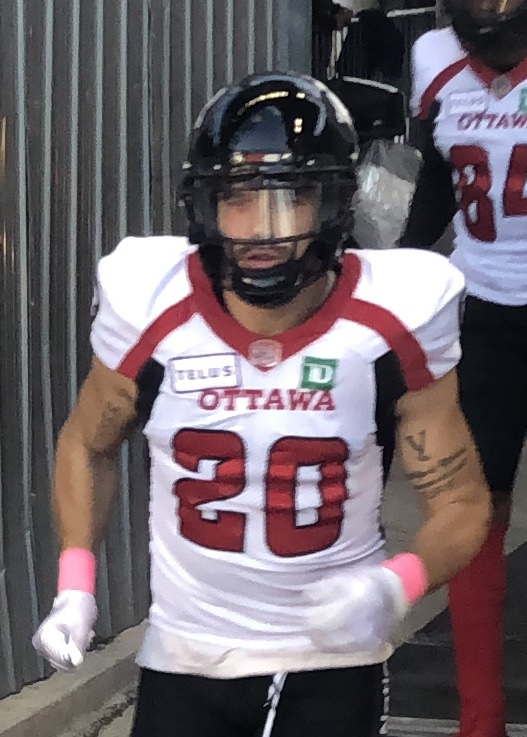
- Bolduc with the Ottawa Redblacks in 2019.

No. 20
- Position: Defensive back

Personal information
- Born: December 12, 1990 (age 35); Montreal, Quebec, Canada
- Listed height: 6 ft 1 in (1.85 m)
- Listed weight: 210 lb (95 kg)

Career information
- University: Université Laval
- CFL draft: 2016: 5th round, 38th overall pick

Career history
- 2016: Calgary Stampeders*
- 2016–2020: Ottawa Redblacks
- * Offseason or practice squad member only

Awards and highlights
- Grey Cup champion (2016)
- Stats at CFL.ca

Jean-Philippe Bolduc is a Canadian former professional football defensive back. He was drafted by the Calgary Stampeders 38th overall in the fifth round of the 2016 CFL draft and signed with the team on May 23, 2016. He was released as part of final training camp cuts on June 19, 2016 and then signed with the Ottawa Redblacks on June 27, 2016. He won his first Grey Cup championship in his rookie year when the Redblacks defeated the Stampeders in the 104th Grey Cup. He played Canadian Interuniversity Sport football for the Laval Rouge et Or. He retired from football on June 15, 2021.
