= 2016 CFL draft =

Canadian football draft

2016 CFL Draft

General information
- Sport: Canadian football
- Date: May 10
- Time: 7:00 PM EDT
- Location: Toronto
- Network: TSN2/RDS2

Overview
- 70 total selections in 8 rounds
- First selection: Josiah St. John, OT; Saskatchewan Roughriders
- Most selections: Toronto Argonauts (9); Ottawa Redblacks (9)
- Fewest selections: Edmonton Eskimos (6)
- CIS selections: 53
- NCAA selections: 17

The 2016 CFL draft took place on Tuesday, May 10, 2016 at 7:00 PM ET on TSN2 and RDS2. 70 players were chosen from among eligible players from Canadian Universities across the country, as well as Canadian players playing in the NCAA. The draft was expanded to eight rounds, which is the most since there were eight rounds in the 1992 CFL draft. This draft also featured the most draft selections since 1987 when 72 players were drafted.

The entity which owns both TSN2 and RDS2 showed the first round of the draft on its cable TV platforms with subsequent rounds streamed on TSN GO online. The English language cable channel TSN2 featured host Farhan Lalji and the CFL on TSN panel including Duane Forde, Gary Lawless, Chris Schultz, and Lee Barrette who were chosen to analyze the teams' needs and picks while the French language channel RDS2 featured host Matthieu Proulx alongside analysts, Bruno Heppell, Didier Orméjuste and Pierre Vercheval.

== Top prospects ==
Final Ranking	December Ranking	September Ranking	Player	Position	School	Hometown
1	2	2	David Onyemata	Defensive tackle	Manitoba	Lagos, Nigeria
2	1	1	Tevaun Smith	Wide receiver	Iowa	Toronto, ON
3	4	9	Mehdi Abdesmad	Defensive end	Boston College	Montreal, QC
4	5	3	Arjen Colquhoun	Cornerback	Michigan State	Windsor, ON
5	3	6	Josiah St. John	Offensive tackle	Oklahoma	Toronto, ON
6	6	10	Charles Vaillancourt	Offensive lineman	Laval	Coaticook, QC
7	-	-	Alex Singleton	Linebacker	Montana State	Thousand Oaks, CA
8	8	17	Trent Corney	Defensive end	Virginia	Brockville, ON
9	13	15	Philippe Gagnon	Offensive lineman	Laval	L'Ancienne-Lorette, QC
10	18	-	Brian Jones	Wide receiver	Acadia	Enfield, NS
11	9	-	Taylor Loffler	Safety	British Columbia	Kelowna, BC
12	12	11	Juwan Brescacin	Wide receiver	Northern Illinois	Mississauga, ON
13	7	5	Mercer Timmis	Running back	Calgary	Burlington, ON
14	11	7	Dillon Guy	Offensive tackle	Buffalo	Hamilton, ON
15	15	13	Anthony Thompson	Safety	Southern Illinois	Montreal, QC
16	-	-	Michael Couture	Offensive lineman	Simon Fraser	Burnaby, BC
17	14	19	Jason Lauzon-Séguin	Offensive tackle	Laval	Pointe-Claire, QC
18	16	4	Elie Bouka	Cornerback	Calgary	Laval, QC
19	17	12	Llevi Noel	Wide receiver	Toronto	Toronto, ON
20	19	16	Doug Corby	Wide receiver	Queen's	Burlington, ON
-	10	8	Mitchell Winters	Defensive lineman	Miami (Ohio)	Mississauga, ON
-	20	-	Quinn van Gylswyk	Placekicker	British Columbia	Victoria, BC
-	-	14	Michael Langlois	Defensive back/linebacker	Laval	Amos, QC
-	-	18	Brett Blaszko	Wide receiver	Calgary	Burlington, ON
-	-	20	George Johnson	Wide receiver	Western	London, ON

== Trades ==
In the explanations below, (D) denotes trades that took place during the draft, while (PD) indicates trades completed pre-draft.

=== Round one ===
- Hamilton → BC (D). Hamilton traded the 5th overall selection and the 23rd overall selection in this year's draft to BC for the 3rd overall selection and the 30th overall selection in this year's draft.
- BC → Hamilton (D). BC traded the 3rd overall selection and the 30th overall selection in this year's draft to Hamilton for the 5th overall selection and the 23rd overall selection in this year's draft.

=== Round two ===
- Saskatchewan → Edmonton (PD). Saskatchewan traded this selection and Cory Watson to Edmonton for the rights to Jorgen Hus and a third-round pick in this year's draft.
- Edmonton → Winnipeg (PD). Edmonton traded this selection and Selvish Capers to Winnipeg for Chris Greaves.

=== Round three ===
- Saskatchewan → Hamilton (PD). Saskatchewan traded this selection and a third-round pick in the 2015 CFL draft to Hamilton for Brandon Boudreaux, a fourth-round pick in this year's draft and a fourth-round pick in the 2015 CFL draft.
- Edmonton → Saskatchewan (PD). Edmonton traded this selection and the rights to Jorgen Hus to Saskatchewan for Cory Watson and a second-round pick in this year's draft.
- Calgary → Saskatchewan (PD). Calgary traded this selection and Tyler Crapigna to Saskatchewan for Jerome Messam and a fifth-round pick in this year's draft.
- BC → Hamilton (D). BC traded the 3rd overall selection and the 30th overall selection in this year's draft to Hamilton for the 5th overall selection and the 23rd overall selection in this year's draft.
- BC → Hamilton (D). BC traded the 21st overall selection in this year's draft to Hamilton for the 30th overall selection and the 32nd overall selection in this year's draft.

=== Round four ===
- Hamilton → Saskatchewan (PD). Hamilton traded this selection, Brandon Boudreaux, and a fourth-round pick in the 2015 CFL draft to Saskatchewan for a third-round pick in this year's draft and a third-round pick in the 2015 CFL draft.
- Edmonton → Hamilton (PD). Edmonton traded this selection and a conditional selection in the 2015 CFL draft to Hamilton for Steve Myddelton.
- Saskatchewan → Toronto (PD). Saskatchewan traded this selection to Toronto for Bruce Campbell.
- Hamilton → BC (D). Hamilton traded the 5th overall selection and the 23rd overall selection in this year's draft to BC for the 3rd overall selection and the 30th overall selection in this year's draft.
- Hamilton → BC (D). Hamilton traded the 30th overall selection and the 32nd overall selection in this year's draft to BC for the 21st overall selection in this year's draft.

=== Round five ===
- Montreal → Saskatchewan (PD). Montreal traded this selection to Saskatchewan for Kevin Glenn.
- Saskatchewan → Calgary (PD). Saskatchewan traded this selection and Jerome Messam to Calgary for Tyler Crapigna and a third-round pick in this year's draft.
- BC → Hamilton (PD). BC traded this selection to Hamilton for Tim O'Neill.

=== Round six ===
- Hamilton → Montreal (PD). Hamilton traded this selection and a conditional seventh-round pick in the 2017 CFL draft to Montreal for Mike Edem.
- Saskatchewan → Ottawa (PD). Saskatchewan traded this selection and a seventh-round pick in this year's draft to Ottawa for Maurice Price and a sixth-round pick in this year's draft.
- Ottawa → Saskatchewan (PD). Ottawa traded this selection and Maurice Price to Saskatchewan for a sixth-round pick and a seventh-round pick in this year's draft.

=== Round seven ===
- Saskatchewan → Ottawa (PD). Saskatchewan traded this selection and a sixth-round pick in this year's draft to Ottawa for Maurice Price and a sixth-round pick in this year's draft.

=== Conditional trades ===
- Ottawa → Saskatchewan (PD). Ottawa traded a conditional selection to Saskatchewan for the rights to Johnny Mark.

== Forfeitures ==
- Winnipeg forfeits their first-round selection after selecting Garrett Waggoner in the 2015 Supplemental Draft.
- Calgary forfeits their seventh-round selection after selecting Brandon Tett in the 2015 Supplemental Draft.

== Draft order ==
= CFL Division All-Star	= CFL All-Star	= Hall of Famer

=== Round one ===
Pick #	CFL team	Player	Position	School
1	Saskatchewan Roughriders	Josiah St. John	OL	Oklahoma
–	Winnipeg Blue Bombers	Forfeit pick		
2	Montreal Alouettes	Philippe Gagnon	OL	Laval
3	Hamilton Tiger-Cats (via BC)	Brandon Revenberg	OL	Grand Valley State
4	Toronto Argonauts	Brian Jones	WR	Acadia
5	BC Lions (via Hamilton)	Charles Vaillancourt	OL	Laval
6	Calgary Stampeders	Alex Singleton	LB	Montana State
7	Ottawa Redblacks	Jason Lauzon-Séguin	OL	Laval
8	Edmonton Eskimos	Tevaun Smith	WR	Iowa

=== Round two ===
Pick #	CFL team	Player	Position	School
9	Winnipeg Blue Bombers (via Edmonton via Saskatchewan)	Trent Corney	DL	Virginia
10	Winnipeg Blue Bombers	Michael Couture	OL	Simon Fraser
11	Montreal Alouettes	Wayne Moore	RB	McMaster
12	BC Lions	Anthony Thompson	DB	Southern Illinois
13	Toronto Argonauts	D. J. Sackey	OL	Toronto
14	Hamilton Tiger-Cats	Mercer Timmis	RB	Calgary
15	Calgary Stampeders	Juwan Brescacin	WR	Northern Illinois
16	Ottawa Redblacks	Mikaël Charland	DB	Concordia
17	Edmonton Eskimos	Arjen Colquhoun	DB	Michigan State

=== Round three ===
Pick #	CFL team	Player	Position	School
18	Hamilton Tiger-Cats (via Saskatchewan)	Mike Jones	WR	Southern
19	Winnipeg Blue Bombers	Taylor Loffler	DB	British Columbia
20	Montreal Alouettes	Sean Jamieson	OL	Western Ontario
21	Hamilton Tiger-Cats (via BC)	Terrell Davis	LB	British Columbia
22	Toronto Argonauts	Jamal Campbell	OL	York
23	BC Lions (via Hamilton)	Brett Blaszko	WR	Calgary
24	Saskatchewan Roughriders (via Calgary)	Elie Bouka	DB	Calgary
25	Ottawa Redblacks	Mehdi Abdesmad	DL	Boston College
26	Saskatchewan Roughriders (via Edmonton)	Quinn Van Glyswyk	K	British Columbia

=== Round four ===
Pick #	CFL team	Player	Position	School
27	Toronto Argonauts (via Saskatchewan)	Declan Cross	RB	McMaster
28	Winnipeg Blue Bombers	Shayne Gauthier	LB	Laval
29	Montreal Alouettes	George Johnson	WR	Western Ontario
30	BC Lions (via Hamilton via BC)	Dillon Guy	OL	Buffalo
31	Toronto Argonauts	Llevi Noel	WR	Toronto
32	BC Lions (via Hamilton)	Shaquille Johnson	WR	Western Ontario
33	Calgary Stampeders	Roman Grozman	OT	Concordia
34	Ottawa Redblacks	Kevin Jackson	LB	Sam Houston State
35	Saskatchewan Roughriders (via Hamilton via Edmonton)	David Onyemata	DL	Manitoba

=== Round five ===
Pick #	CFL team	Player	Position	School
36	Saskatchewan Roughriders	Alex Ogbongbemiga	LB	Calgary
37	Winnipeg Blue Bombers	Zachary Intzandt	OL	McMaster
38	Calgary Stampeders (via Saskatchewan via Montreal)	Jean-Philippe Bolduc	DB	Laval
39	Hamilton Tiger-Cats (via BC)	Felix Faubert-Lussier	WR	Laval
40	Toronto Argonauts	Curtis Newton	LB	Guelph
41	Hamilton Tiger-Cats	Elroy Douglas	DB	Missouri Western State
42	Calgary Stampeders	Pierre-Luc Caron	LB	Laval
43	Ottawa Redblacks	Randy Beardy	OL	Windsor
44	Edmonton Eskimos	Josh Woodman	DB	Western Ontario

=== Round six ===
Pick #	CFL team	Player	Position	School
45	Ottawa Redblacks (via Saskatchewan)	Kyle Fraser-Audit	OL	Guelph
46	Winnipeg Blue Bombers	Rupert Butcher	DL	Western Ontario
47	Montreal Alouettes	A'dre Fraser	WR	Guelph
48	BC Lions	Brennan Van Nistelrooy	DB	Alberta
49	Toronto Argonauts	Chris Kolankowski	OL	York
50	Montreal Alouettes (via Hamilton)	Emmitt Tims	WR	Saskatchewan
51	Calgary Stampeders	Michael Kashak	DL	McMaster
52	Saskatchewan Roughriders (via Ottawa)	Alex McKay	OL	Manitoba
53	Edmonton Eskimos	Doug Corby	WR	Queen's

=== Round seven ===
Pick #	CFL team	Player	Position	School
54	Ottawa Redblacks (via Saskatchewan)	Arto Khatchikian	LB	Concordia
55	Winnipeg Blue Bombers	Alex Vitt	SB	Manitoba
56	Montreal Alouettes	Maiko Zepeda	DB	Montreal
57	BC Lions	Nathan O'Halloran	FB	Windsor
58	Toronto Argonauts	Johnathan Ngeleka Muamba	DB	McMaster
59	Hamilton Tiger-Cats	Mitchell Barnett	LB	British Columbia
–	Calgary Stampeders	Forfeit pick		
60	Ottawa Redblacks	Jamal Kett	WR	Western Ontario
61	Edmonton Eskimos	Doug Parrish	LB	Western Oregon

=== Round eight ===
Pick #	CFL team	Player	Position	School
62	Saskatchewan Roughriders	Joshua Stanford	WR	Kansas
63	Winnipeg Blue Bombers	Frank Renaud	LB	Windsor
64	Montreal Alouettes	Matthew Toppan	OL	Guelph
65	BC Lions	Boyd Richardson	DL	British Columbia
66	Toronto Argonauts	Ryan Nieuwesteeg	RB	Guelph
67	Hamilton Tiger-Cats	Matt Uren	WR	Western Ontario
68	Calgary Stampeders	Quinn Horton	DL	Simon Fraser
69	Ottawa Redblacks	Guillaume Tremblay-Lebel	LB	Laval
70	Edmonton Eskimos	DJ Lalama	LB	Manitoba
