= Sean Jamieson (Canadian football) =

Canadian gridiron football player (born 1994)

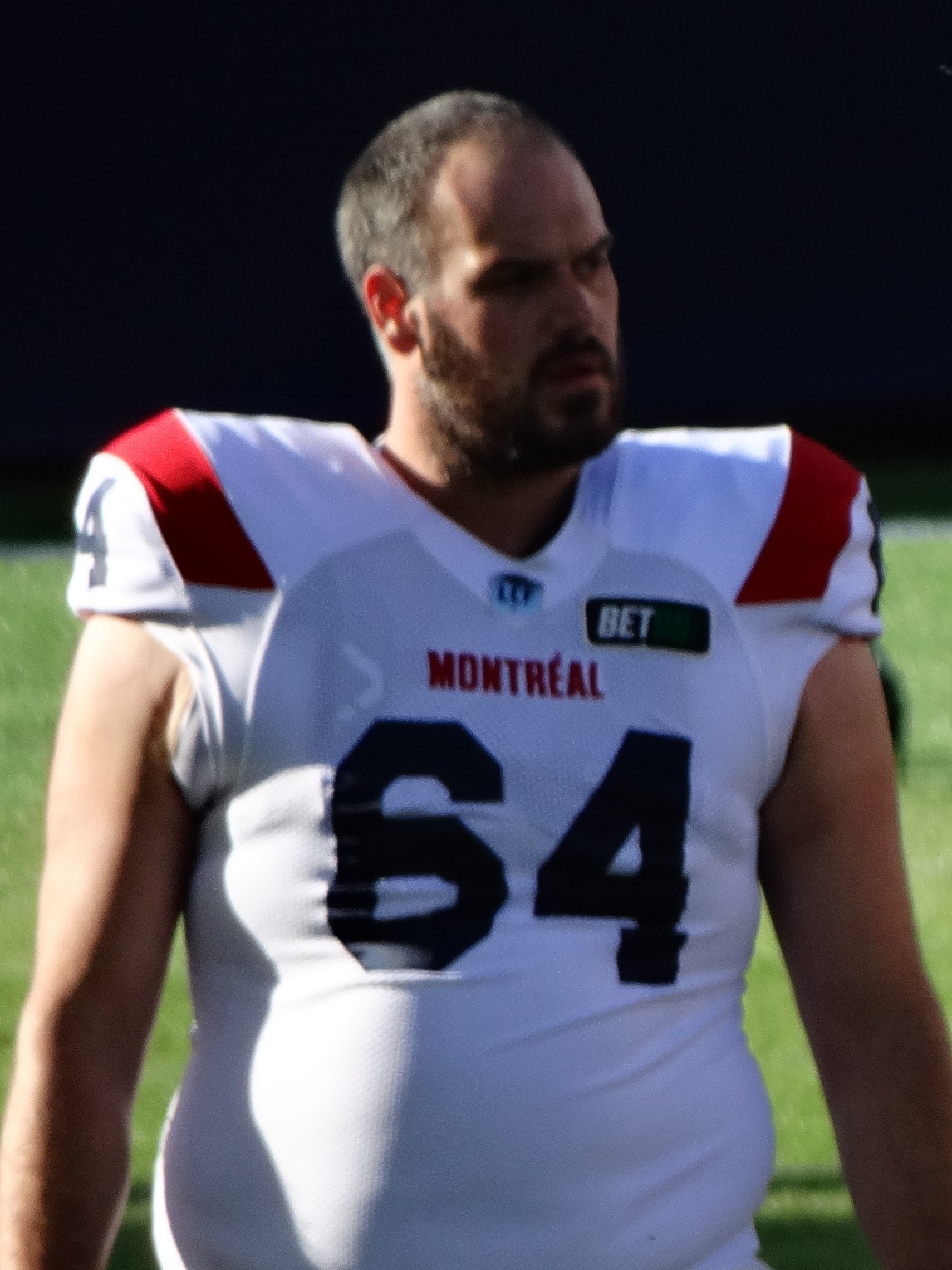
- Jamieson with the Montreal Alouettes in 2022

Western Mustangs
- Title: Offensive line coach
- CFL status: National

Personal information
- Born: July 12, 1994 (age 32); Winnipeg, Manitoba, Canada
- Listed height: 6 ft 7 in (2.01 m)
- Listed weight: 317 lb (144 kg)

Career information
- University: Western
- CFL draft: 2016: 3rd round, 20th overall pick

Career history

Playing
- 2016: Montreal Alouettes*
- 2017–2023: Montreal Alouettes
- * Offseason or practice squad member only

Coaching
- 2024–present: Western Mustangs

Awards and highlights
- Grey Cup champion (2023)
- Stats at CFL.ca

Sean Jamieson (born July 12, 1994) is a Canadian former professional football offensive linemen who is currently the offensive line coach for the Western Mustangs of U Sports football. He has played for the Montreal Alouettes of the Canadian Football League (CFL). He won a Grey Cup championship with the Alouettes in 2023.

== University career ==
Jamieson played U Sports football for the Western Mustangs from 2012 to 2016. He was a CIS First Team All-Canadian in 2014 and 2015.

== Professional career ==
Jamieson was drafted in the third round, 20th overall, in the 2016 CFL draft by the Montreal Alouettes and signed with the team on May 25, 2016. He returned to Western University to play his final year of eligibility in 2016 and re-joined the Alouettes in 2017 where he played in his first career game against the Ottawa Redblacks in the Labour Day Classic on August 31, 2017. Jamieson played in eight regular season games during his rookie year in 2017. He played in 16 games in 2018 and then 15 games in 2019. He did not play in 2020 due to the cancellation of the 2020 CFL season. He played in eight games in 2021.

Jamieson suffered a knee injury on June 23, 2022 and missed the next three games. He was activated from the six-game injured reserve list and return to action on July 28, 2022. Later in the season, Jamieson was diagnosed with a torn ACL in mid-October, ending his season.

While still recovering from his ACL injury from 2022, Jamieson began the 2023 season on the six-game injured list. He would ultimately miss the entire regular season and one playoff game due to the injury. However, he dressed as a backup offensive lineman in the Alouettes' victory in the 110th Grey Cup game and Jamieson won his first Grey Cup championship. He was released in the following offseason on January 25, 2024.

== Coaching career ==
Jamieson joined the University of Western Ontario Western Mustangs football program as an offensive line coach for the 2024 season.
