= Philippe Gagnon (Canadian football) =

Canadian gridiron football player (born 1992)

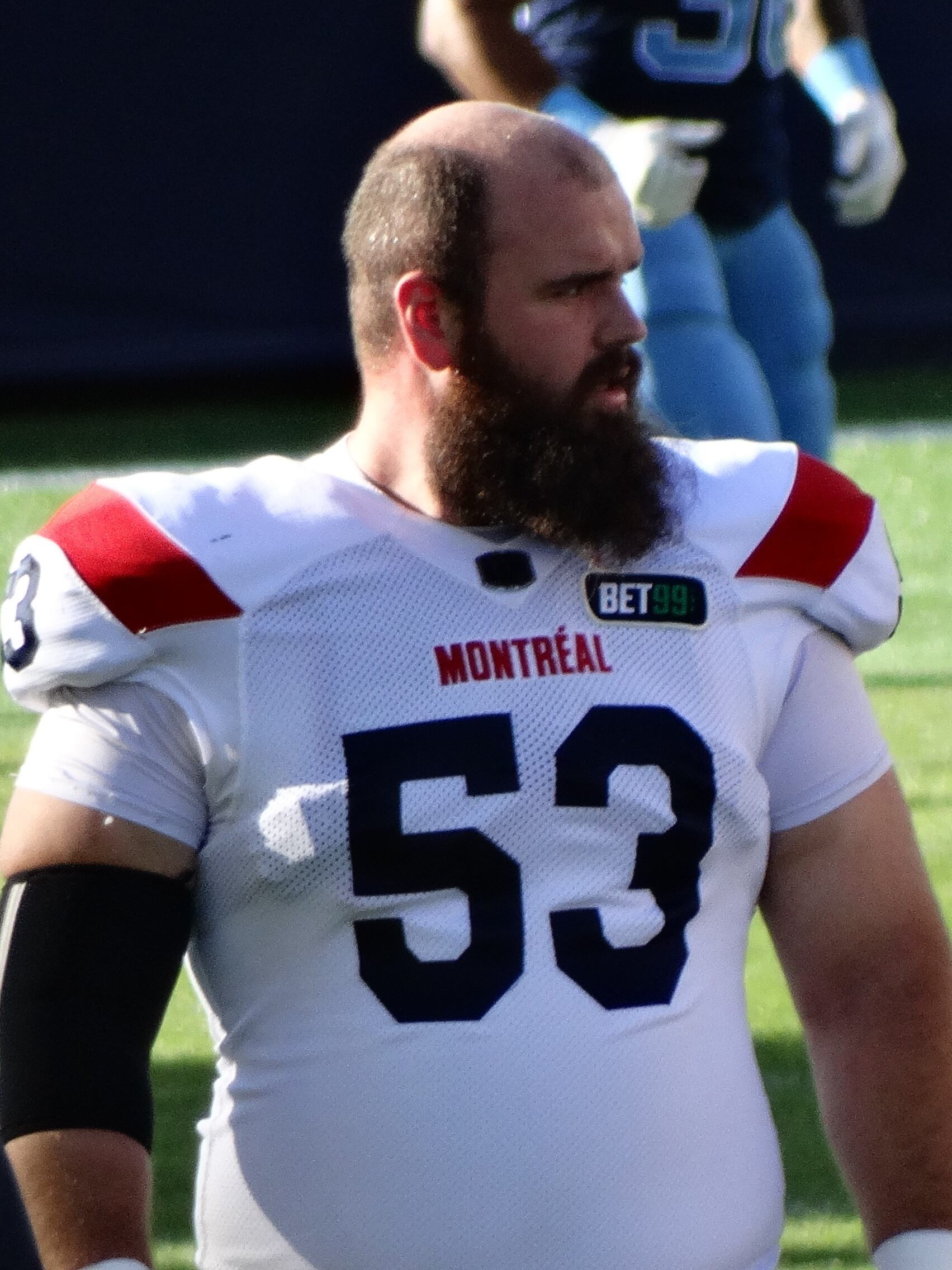
- Gagnon with the Montreal Alouettes in 2022

Profile
- Position: Offensive lineman

Personal information
- Born: August 21, 1992 (age 34); L'Ancienne-Lorette, Quebec, Canada
- Listed height: 6 ft 4 in (1.93 m)
- Listed weight: 311 lb (141 kg)

Career information
- University: Laval
- CFL draft: 2016: 1st round, 2nd overall pick

Career history
- 2016–2018: Montreal Alouettes
- 2019: Ottawa Redblacks
- 2020–2024: Montreal Alouettes
- 2025: Saskatchewan Roughriders

Awards and highlights
- 2× Grey Cup champion (2023, 2025)
- Stats at CFL.ca

Philippe Gagnon (born August 21, 1992) is a Canadian professional football offensive lineman.

== University career ==
Gagnon played CIS football for the Laval Rouge et Or where he was part of two Vanier Cup championship teams in 2012 and 2013.

== Professional career ==
=== Montreal Alouettes (first stint) ===
Gagnon was drafted by the Montreal Alouettes with the second overall pick of the 2016 CFL draft and was later signed by the team on May 25, 2016. He played in three seasons for the Alouettes.

=== Ottawa Redblacks ===
Upon becoming a free agent, Gagnon signed with the Ottawa Redblacks on February 13, 2019. He played in nine games for the Redblacks in 2019 and started in eight. He was released on March 16, 2020.

=== Montreal Alouettes (second stint) ===
On March 19, 2020, it was announced that Gagnon had re-signed with the Alouettes on a one-year contract. He re-signed with the team on December 17, 2020. He became a free agent upon the expiration of his contract on February 11, 2025.

=== Saskatchewan Roughriders ===
On February 11, 2025, it was announced that Gagnon had signed with the Saskatchewan Roughriders. He became a free agent after the 2025 season.
