= Felix Faubert-Lussier =

Canadian football player (born 1991)

Profile
- Position: Wide receiver

Personal information
- Born: October 14, 1991 (age 35); Montreal, Quebec
- Listed height: 6 ft 1 in (1.85 m)
- Listed weight: 212 lb (96 kg)

Career information
- High school: Collège Jean-Eudes
- University: Laval
- CFL draft: 2016: 5th round, 39th overall pick

Career history
- 2016: Hamilton Tiger-Cats*
- 2017–2018: Hamilton Tiger-Cats
- 2019–2020: Montreal Alouettes
- * Offseason or practice squad member only

Awards and highlights
- 3x Vanier Cup champion (2012, 2013, 2016)
- Stats at CFL.ca

Felix Faubert-Lussier (born October 14, 1991) is a Canadian former professional football wide receiver who played for three seasons in the Canadian Football League (CFL). He played U Sports football with the Laval Rouge et Or from 2012 to 2016, where he was part of three Vanier Cup winning teams.

== Professional career ==
=== Hamilton Tiger-Cats ===
Faubert-Lussier was drafted in the fifth round, 39th overall by the Hamilton Tiger-Cats in the 2016 CFL draft and he signed with the team on May 27, 2016. He spent time on the team's practice roster, but was released on August 17, 2016 to return to play for Laval. He re-signed with the Tiger-Cats for the 2017 season and played in 14 regular season games, starting four. He had three catches for 29 yards that year while also serving as emergency punter and kicker, recording four punts for a 43.3-yard average and two kickoffs for a 55.5-yard average. He played in 13 games in 2018, starting two, and recorded 11 catches for 74 yards. He became a free agent on February 12, 2019.

=== Montreal Alouettes ===
On February 20, 2019, Faubert-Lussier signed with his hometown Montreal Alouettes to a one-year contract. He played in two games in 2019 before being released on July 8, 2019. However, on July 16, 2019, Faubert-Lussier re-signed with the Alouettes. Overall in 2019, he played in nine regular season games and had nine receptions for 102 yards.

Faubert-Lussier re-signed with the Alouettes on January 20, 2021. However, he later announced his retirement on July 6, 2021.
