= Jean-Samuel Blanc =

Canadian football player (born 1990)

No. 42
- Position: Defensive lineman

Personal information
- Born: November 1, 1990 (age 36); Montreal, Quebec, Canada
- Listed height: 6 ft 1 in (1.85 m)
- Listed weight: 245 lb (111 kg)

Career information
- University: Montreal
- CFL draft: 2015: undrafted

Career history
- 2015–2021: Montreal Alouettes

Awards and highlights
- 50th Vanier Cup champion
- Stats at CFL.ca

Jean-Samuel Blanc (born November 1, 1990) is a Canadian former professional football defensive linemen who played for the Montreal Alouettes of the Canadian Football League (CFL). After going undrafted in the 2015 CFL draft, Blanc signed with the Alouettes on May 19, 2015 and made the team's active roster following training camp that year. He played college football for the Montreal Carabins where he was a member of the 50th Vanier Cup championship team.

== Professional career ==
Blanc signed a contract extension with the Montreal Alouettes on January 20, 2021.
