= Sean Thomas Erlington =

Canadian gridiron football player (born 1992)

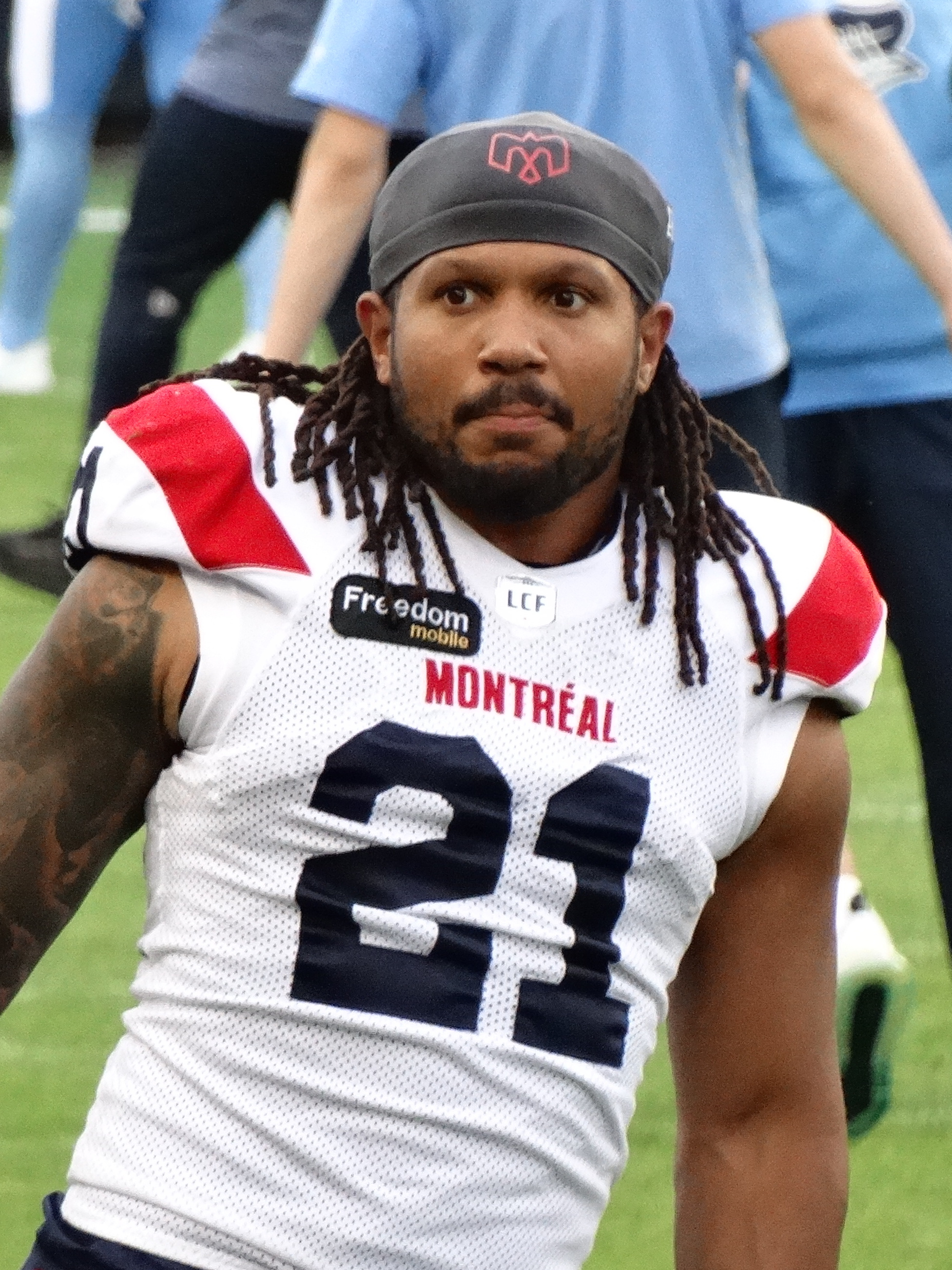
- Erlington with the Montreal Alouettes in 2024

Profile
- Position: Running back

Personal information
- Born: July 28, 1992 (age 34); Montreal, Quebec, Canada
- Listed height: 5 ft 9 in (1.75 m)
- Listed weight: 217 lb (98 kg)

Career information
- University: Montreal
- CFL draft: 2017: 8th round, 66th overall pick

Career history
- Hamilton Tiger-Cats (2017–2023); Montreal Alouettes (2024–2025)

Awards and highlights
- Vanier Cup champion (2014)
- Stats at CFL.ca

Sean Thomas Erlington (born July 28, 1992) is a Canadian former professional football running back who played in eight seasons in the Canadian Football League (CFL) for the Hamilton Tiger-Cats and Montreal Alouettes.

== University career ==
Thomas Erlington played U Sports football with the Montreal Carabins from 2013 to 2016 where he was a member of the 50th Vanier Cup championship team in 2014.

== Professional career ==
Pre-draft measurables
Height	Weight	40-yard dash	20-yard shuttle	Three-cone drill	Vertical jump	Broad jump	Bench press
5 ft 8 5/8 in (1.74 m)	210 lb (95 kg)	4.84 s	4.19 s	7.14 s	34.5 in (0.88 m)	8 ft 10 1/4 in (2.70 m)	23 reps
All values from CFL Combine

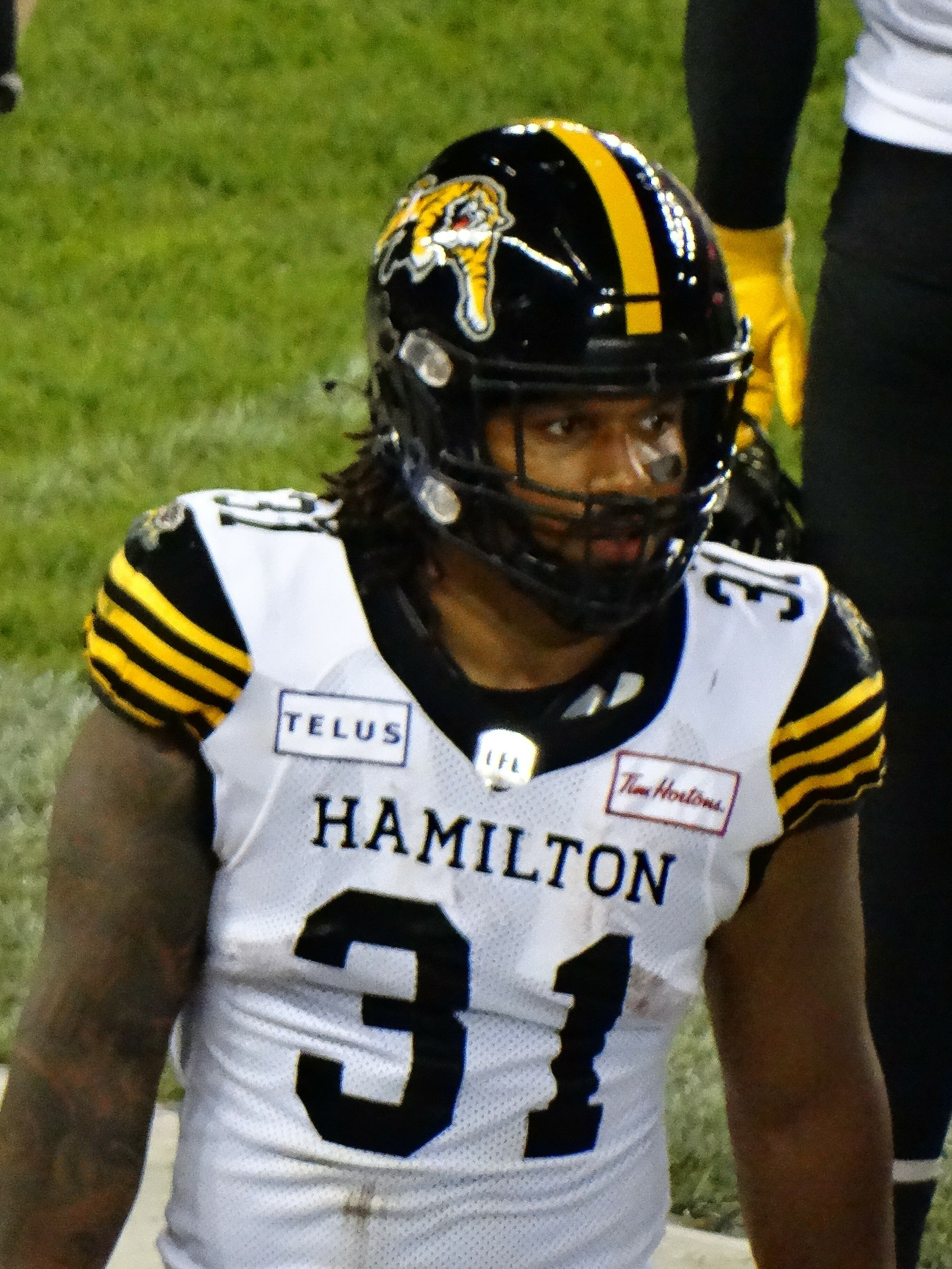
Erlington with the Hamilton Tiger-Cats in 2022

=== Hamilton Tiger-Cats ===
Thomas Erlington was drafted in the eighth round, 66th overall by the Hamilton Tiger-Cats in the 2017 CFL draft and signed with the team on May 24, 2017. He played in his first career game on July 29, 2017, against the Calgary Stampeders, but did not record any stats. In the first season of his professional career, he was largely a special teams contributor, but blossomed into an effective change of pace back and returner in 2018, putting up 218 yards on 34 carries for better than a 6-yard per carry average. He scored two touchdowns during the regular season; a rushing score and a blocked punt recovery for a touchdown. Both scores came against Montreal, although in separate games. During the playoffs, Thomas Erlington had three rushes for 15 yards as well as a receiving touchdown for the Ti-Cats, who reached the East Division finals but were defeated by Ottawa, who advanced to the 106th Grey Cup. Following the season, he was signed to a two-year extension.

Thomas Erlington suffered a knee injury early in the 2019 season and underwent surgery on July 10, 2019. He signed a contract extension with the team on December 27, 2020. However, he did not play in 2020 due to the cancellation of the 2020 CFL season.

In a shortened 2021 season, Thomas Erlington played in 12 regular season games and started in eight, carrying the ball 70 times for 356 yards and four touchdowns and recording 20 receptions for 129 yards and one touchdown. He also dressed in all three post-season games, including his first Grey Cup game, but did not record any stats in the championship as the Tiger-Cats lost to the Winnipeg Blue Bombers 33–25 in overtime in the 108th Grey Cup game. On the day before the start of free agency, Thomas Erlington re-signed with the Tiger-Cats on February 7, 2022.

In his first start of the 2022 season, on June 18, 2022, Thomas Erlington had five carries for 18 rushing yards and seven receptions for 72 yards and a touchdown, but had a costly drop in overtime that resulted in an interception and victory for the Calgary Stampeders. He finished the 2022 season having played in all 18 regular season games carrying the ball 53 times for 371 yards with one rushing touchdown. He also caught 25 passes for 216 yards with another score. Erlington and the Ti-Cats agreed to a contract extension on February 6, 2023.

In 2023, Thomas Erlington began the season on the injured list, but played in 11 regular season games where he had 16 carries for 88 yards and a rushing touchdown along with 12 receptions for 90 yards and a receiving touchdown. He became a free agent upon the expiry of his contract on February 13, 2024.

=== Montreal Alouettes ===
On February 13, 2024, it was announced that Thomas Erlington had signed with the Montreal Alouettes. In 2024, Thomas Erlington played in all 18 regular season games where he recorded 23 carries for 125 rushing yards and five receptions for 42 yards. He also played in the East Final where he had one carry for 38 yards and one catch for 23 yards, but the Alouettes lost to the Toronto Argonauts.

Thomas Erlington began the 2025 season as the starter at running back where he had 17 carries for 86 yards in the team's opening day game against the Argonauts. He started the team's first nine games, but was injured and replaced by Travis Theis in game 10. Upon returning from injury in the next game, Thomas Erlington dressed as the backup to Theis. In the team's week 14 game against the Tiger-Cats, he suffered a neck injury and was then placed on the six-game injured list and was out for the rest of the regular season. In 11 regular season games, he recorded 88 carries for 386 yards and two touchdowns and nine receptions for 68 yards and one touchdown. After thinking that his career was over, he returned to play in the team's East Semi-Final game against the Winnipeg Blue Bombers although he did not record any statistics in the team's victory. He was then a healthy scratch in the East Final and 112th Grey Cup game, where the Alouettes lost to the Saskatchewan Roughriders.

Thomas Erlington became a free agent upon the expiry of his contract on February 10, 2026. He later announced his retirement on March 4, 2026. He finished his career having played in 106 regular season games where he had 318 carries for 1,769 yards and nine rushing touchdowns and 85 receptions for 829 yards and five receiving touchdowns.
