= 2015 Hamilton Tiger-Cats season =

Season of Canadian Football League team the Hamilton Tiger-Cats

- General manager: Kent Austin
- Head coach: Kent Austin
- Home stadium: Tim Hortons Field

Results
- Record: 10–8
- Division place: 2nd, East
- Playoffs: Lost East Final
- Team MOP: Zach Collaros
- Team MOC: Ted Laurent
- Team MOR: Terrence Toliver

Uniform

The 2015 Hamilton Tiger-Cats season was the 58th season for the team in the Canadian Football League (CFL) and their 66th overall. The Tiger-Cats finished in second place in the East Division with a 10–8 record and hosted a playoff game for the third consecutive season. The Tiger-Cats defeated the Toronto Argonauts in the East Semi-Final, but lost to the Ottawa Redblacks in the East Final, ending their quest to compete in three straight Grey Cups. This marked the first full season for the team playing at their new stadium, Tim Hortons Field. The Tiger-Cats played their first four games on the road due to stadium conflicts with the 2015 Pan Am Games. When they returned to their home field, they sold out all nine regular seasons games, which was the first time that the franchise had done that since 1973.

== Offseason ==
=== CFL draft ===
The 2015 CFL draft took place on May 12, 2015. The Tiger-Cats had six selections in the seven-round draft, prominently trading away first and third round picks for Ryan Bomben hours before the draft. The club also traded their fifth round pick to the BC Lions for Seydou Junior Haidara and acquired an additional sixth round pick after trading Darcy Brown to Edmonton for Ricardo Colclough.

Round	Pick	Player	Position	School/Club team
2	17	Byron Archambault	LB	Montreal
3	20	Jonathan Langa	LB	Saint Mary's
4	29	Ron Omara	LB	St. Francis Xavier
6	51	Everett Ellefsen	DB	McNeese State
6	52	Daniel English	WR	British Columbia
7	61	Preston Huggins	LB	Western

== Preseason ==
Week	Date	Kickoff	Opponent	Results		TV	Venue	Attendance	Summary
Week	Date	Kickoff	Opponent	Score	Record	TV	Venue	Attendance	Summary
A	Mon, June 8	7:30 p.m. EDT	vs. Ottawa Redblacks	W 37–10	1–0	Online	Tim Hortons Field	24,000	Recap
B	Bye								
C	Fri, June 19	8:30 p.m. EDT	at Winnipeg Blue Bombers	W 26–15	2–0	None	Investors Group Field	24,344	Recap

== Regular season ==
=== Season standings ===
East Division
Team	GP	W	L	PF	PA	Pts	
Ottawa Redblacks	18	12	6	464	454	24	Details
Hamilton Tiger-Cats	18	10	8	530	391	20	Details
Toronto Argonauts	18	10	8	438	499	20	Details
Montreal Alouettes	18	6	12	388	402	12	Details

=== Season schedule ===
Week	Date	Kickoff	Opponent	Results		TV	Venue	Attendance	Summary
Week	Date	Kickoff	Opponent	Score	Record	TV	Venue	Attendance	Summary
1	Fri, June 26	9:00 p.m. EDT	at Calgary Stampeders	L 23–24	0–1	TSN/RDS2/ESPN2	McMahon Stadium	28,487	Recap
2	Thurs, July 2	8:30 p.m. EDT	at Winnipeg Blue Bombers	W 52–26	1–1	TSN/RDS2/ESPN2	Investors Group Field	27,279	Recap
3	Bye								
4	Thurs, July 16	7:30 p.m. EDT	at Montreal Alouettes	L 13–17	1–2	TSN/RDS	Molson Stadium	20,773	Recap
5	Sun, July 26	7:00 p.m. EDT	at Saskatchewan Roughriders	W 31–21	2–2	TSN	Mosaic Stadium	31,683	Recap
6	Mon, Aug 3	7:00 p.m. EDT	vs. Toronto Argonauts	W 34–18	3–2	TSN/RDS2/ESPN2	Tim Hortons Field	24,135	Recap
7	Sun, Aug 9	5:00 p.m. EDT	vs. Winnipeg Blue Bombers	W 38–8	4–2	TSN/RDS2/ESPNews	Tim Hortons Field	24,068	Recap
8	Sat, Aug 15	7:00 p.m. EDT	vs. BC Lions	W 52–22	5–2	TSN/RDS	Tim Hortons Field	24,110	Recap
9	Fri, Aug 21	9:00 p.m. EDT	at Edmonton Eskimos	W 49–20	6–2	TSN	Commonwealth Stadium	28,858	Recap
10	Thurs, Aug 27	7:30 p.m. EDT	vs. Montreal Alouettes	L 23–26	6–3	TSN/RDS/ESPN2	Tim Hortons Field	24,212	Recap
11	Mon, Sept 7	1:00 p.m. EDT	vs. Toronto Argonauts	W 42–12	7–3	TSN	Tim Hortons Field	24,390	Recap
12	Fri, Sept 11	7:30 p.m. EDT	at Toronto Argonauts	W 35–27	8–3	TSN/RDS2	Rogers Centre	17,694	Recap
13	Sat, Sept 19	4:00 p.m. EDT	vs. Edmonton Eskimos	L 18–25	8–4	TSN	Tim Hortons Field	24,300	Recap
14	Bye								
15	Fri, Oct 2	7:30 p.m. EDT	vs. Calgary Stampeders	L 20–23	8–5	TSN/RDS2	Tim Hortons Field	24,300	Recap
16	Fri, Oct 9	7:30 p.m. EDT	vs. Saskatchewan Roughriders	W 30–15	9–5	TSN	Tim Hortons Field	24,222	Recap
17	Sun, Oct 18	1:00 p.m. EDT	at Montreal Alouettes	W 23–11	10–5	TSN/RDS/ESPN2	Molson Stadium	23,058	Recap
18	Fri, Oct 23	10:00 p.m. EDT	at BC Lions	L 13–40	10–6	TSN	BC Place	20,058	Recap
19	Sun, Nov 1	1:00 p.m. EST	vs. Ottawa Redblacks	L 6–12	10–7	TSN	Tim Hortons Field	24,340	Recap
20	Sat, Nov 7	4:00 p.m. EST	at Ottawa Redblacks	L 28–44	10–8	TSN/RDS2	TD Place Stadium	24,459	Recap

== Post-season ==
=== Schedule ===
Game	Date	Kickoff	Opponent	Results		TV	Venue	Attendance	Summary
Game	Date	Kickoff	Opponent	Score	Record	TV	Venue	Attendance	Summary
East Semi-Final	Sun, Nov 15	1:00 p.m. EST	vs. Toronto Argonauts	W 25–22	1–0	TSN/RDS	Tim Hortons Field	24,029	Recap
East Final	Sun, Nov 22	1:00 p.m. EST	at Ottawa Redblacks	L 28–35	1–1	TSN/RDS	TD Place Stadium	25,093	Recap

== Roster ==
2015 Hamilton Tiger-Cats final roster
Quarterbacks: 13 Mitchell Gale; 12 Jacory Harris; 8 Jeremiah Masoli; Running backs: 32 C. J. Gable; 46 C. O. Primé; 18 Anthony Woodson; Receivers: 88 Johnny Aprile; 16 Brandon Banks; 83 Andy Fantuz; 84 Bakari Grant; 82 Kealoha Pilares; 17 Luke Tasker; 1 Tiquan Underwood	Offensive linemen: 59 Marc Dile T; 67 Peter Dyakowski G; 68 Mike Filer C; 52 Mathieu Girard C; 55 Tim O'Neill G; 69 Landon Rice G/T; Defensive linemen: 99 Mike Atkinson DT; 92 Troy Davis DE; 45 Arnaud Gascon-Nadon DE; 6 Bryan Hall DT; 5 Justin Hickman DE; 97 Ted Laurent DT	Linebackers: 42 David Caldwell; 41 Erik Harris; 37 Beau Landry; 21 Simoni Lawrence; 58 Ron Omara; 33 Frédéric Plesius; 44 Taylor Reed; Defensive backs: 28 Craig Butler; 35 Mike Daly; 20 Emanuel Davis; 2 Mike Edem; 11 Ed Gainey; 43 Neil King; 0 Rico Murray; 22 Courtney Stephen; 9 Brandon Stewart	Special teams: 48 Aaron Crawford LS; 7 Justin Medlock K/P; Reserve roster: 29 Jalil Carter DB; 91 Drake Nevis DT; Practice roster: 87 Jasper Collins SB; 71 Everett Ellefsen DE; 25 Ray Holley RB; 70 Stephen Mawa DE; 19 Quincy McDuffie WR; 39 Dan Molls LB; 53 Everton Williams DT	Injured list: 49 Byron Archambault LB; 64 Ryan Bomben G; 95 Brian Bulcke DT; 81 Matt Coates WR; 94 Antonio Coleman DE; 4 Zach Collaros QB; 27 Michael Ford RB; 98 Linden Gaydosh DT; 90 Evan Gill DT; 96 Hasan Hazime DT; 63 Cord Howard T; 30 Jay Langa DB; 56 Jeremy Lewis T; 26 Mossis Madu RB; 15 Jeff Mathews QB; 48 Kyle Miller DB; 40 Eric Norwood DE; 50 Jake Olson T; 31 Hugh O'Neill P; 24 Cleshawn Page DB; 3 Johnny Sears DB; 14 Terrell Sinkfield SB; 80 Terrence Toliver WR; 93 Adrian Tracy DE; 89 Spencer Watt WR; Italics indicate International player

== Coaching staff ==
2015 Hamilton Tiger-Cats staff
Front office: Caretaker – Bob Young; Chief executive officer – Scott Mitchell; Vice president of football operations and general manager – Kent Austin; Director of football operations – Shawn Burke; Director of canadian scouting – Drew Allemang; Director of U.S. Scouting – Eric Tillman; Pro/College Scout – Spencer Zimmerman; Video co-ordinator – Matt Allemang; Head coach: Head coach – Kent Austin; Offensive coaches: Offensive coordinator and receivers – Tommy Condell; Running backs and offensive quality control – Corey Grant; Offensive line – Allen Rudolph	Defensive coaches: Defensive coordinator – Orlondo Steinauer; Defensive backs – James Stanley; Linebackers – Jeff Reinebold; Defensive line – Dennis McPhee; Assistant defensive – Marcello Simmons; Special teams coaches: Special teams coordinator – Jeff Reinebold; Assistant special teams – John Zamberlin; Assistant special teams – Marcello Simmons; → Coaching staff
