= 2016 Hamilton Tiger-Cats season =

Season of Canadian Football League team the Hamilton Tiger-Cats

- General manager: Eric Tillman
- Head coach: Kent Austin
- Home stadium: Tim Hortons Field

Results
- Record: 7–11
- Division place: 2nd, East
- Playoffs: Lost East Semi-Final
- Team MOP: Andy Fantuz
- Team MOC: Andy Fantuz
- Team MOR: Brandon Revenberg

Uniform

The 2016 Hamilton Tiger-Cats season was the 59th season for the team in the Canadian Football League (CFL) and their 67th overall. The Tiger-Cats finished in second place in the East Division and finished with a 7–11 record. The Tiger-Cats qualified for the playoffs for the fourth straight season, including their fourth straight season hosting a playoff game, but lost in the East Semi-Final to the Edmonton Eskimos 24–21. It was the first ever playoff match up between those two teams (not including Grey Cup games) and the third time that a crossover team won a playoff game.

== CFL draft ==
Round	Pick	Player	Position	School/Club team
1	3	Brandon Revenberg	OL	Grand Valley State
2	14	Mercer Timmis	RB	Calgary
3	18	Mike Jones	WR	Southern
3	21	Terrell Davis	LB	British Columbia
5	39	Felix Faubert-Lussier	WR	Laval
5	41	Elroy Douglas	DB	Missouri Western State
7	59	Mitchell Barnett	LB	British Columbia
8	67	Matt Uren	WR	Western Ontario

== Preseason ==
Week	Date	Kickoff	Opponent	Results		TV	Venue	Attendance	Summary
Week	Date	Kickoff	Opponent	Score	Record	TV	Venue	Attendance	Summary
A	Sat, June 11	4:00 p.m. EDT	at Toronto Argonauts	L 16–25	0–1	None	BMO Field	16,168	Recap
B	Fri, June 17	7:30 p.m. EDT	vs. Ottawa Redblacks	W 42–25	1–1	Ticats.ca	Tim Hortons Field		Recap

== Regular season ==
=== Season standings ===
East Division
Team	GP	W	L	T	Pts	PF	PA	Div	Stk	
Ottawa Redblacks	18	8	9	1	17	486	498	5–3	L1	Details
Hamilton Tiger-Cats	18	7	11	0	14	507	502	5–3	L2	Details
Montreal Alouettes	18	7	11	0	14	383	416	3–5	W3	Details
Toronto Argonauts	18	5	13	0	10	383	568	3–5	L7	Details

=== Season schedule ===
Week	Date	Kickoff	Opponent	Results		TV	Venue	Attendance	Summary
Week	Date	Kickoff	Opponent	Score	Record	TV	Venue	Attendance	Summary
1	Thurs, June 23	7:30 p.m. EDT	at Toronto Argonauts	W 42–20	1–0	TSN/RDS/ESPNEWS	BMO Field	24,812	Recap
2	Fri, July 1	7:00 p.m. EDT	vs. BC Lions	L 3–28	1–1	TSN/RDS	Tim Hortons Field	24,123	Recap
3	Thurs, July 7	7:00 p.m. EDT	vs. Winnipeg Blue Bombers	L 24–28	1–2	TSN/ESPN2	Tim Hortons Field	23,846	Recap
4	Fri, July 15	7:30 p.m. EDT	at Montreal Alouettes	W 31–7	2–2	TSN/RDS	Molson Stadium	20,098	Recap
5	Sat, July 23	7:00 p.m. EDT	at Edmonton Eskimos	W 37–31	3–2	TSN	Commonwealth Stadium	32,083	Recap
6	Bye								
7	Wed, Aug 3	8:30 p.m. EDT	at Winnipeg Blue Bombers	L 11–37	3–3	TSN	Investors Group Field	24,041	Recap
8	Sat, Aug 13	10:00 p.m. EDT	at BC Lions	L 38–45	3–4	TSN	BC Place	21,213	Recap
9	Sat, Aug 20	7:00 p.m. EDT	vs. Saskatchewan Roughriders	W 53–7	4–4	TSN	Tim Hortons Field	24,166	Recap
10	Sun, Aug 28	7:00 p.m. EDT	at Calgary Stampeders	L 24–30	4–5	TSN	McMahon Stadium	26,271	Recap
11	Mon, Sept 5	6:30 p.m. EDT	vs. Toronto Argonauts	W 49–36	5–5	TSN	Tim Hortons Field	24,512	Recap
12	Sun, Sept 11	4:30 p.m. EDT	at Toronto Argonauts	L 33–21	5–6	TSN	BMO Field	17,214	Recap
13	Fri, Sept 16	7:00 p.m. EDT	vs. Montreal Alouettes	W 20–17	6–6	TSN/RDS	Tim Hortons Field	23,612	Recap
14	Sat, Sept 24	9:30 p.m. EDT	at Saskatchewan Roughriders	L 18–20	6–7	TSN	Mosaic Stadium	30,029	Recap
15	Sat, Oct 1	4:00 p.m. EDT	vs. Calgary Stampeders	L 17–36	6–8	TSN	Tim Hortons Field	23,741	Recap
16	Bye								
17	Fri, Oct 14	7:00 p.m. EDT	vs. Ottawa Redblacks	L 29–30	6–9	TSN	Tim Hortons Field	23,868	Recap
18	Fri, Oct 21	7:00 p.m. EDT	at Ottawa Redblacks	W 39–36 (2OT)	7–9	TSN	TD Place Stadium	24,210	Recap
19	Fri, Oct 28	7:00 p.m. EDT	vs. Edmonton Eskimos	L 26–29	7–10	TSN	Tim Hortons Field	24,031	Recap
20	Sat, Nov 5	1:00 p.m. EDT	vs. Montreal Alouettes	L 25–32	7–11	TSN/RDS	Tim Hortons Field	24,113	Recap

== Post-season ==
=== Schedule ===
Game	Date	Kickoff	Opponent	Results		TV	Venue	Attendance	Summary
Game	Date	Kickoff	Opponent	Score	Record	TV	Venue	Attendance	Summary
East Semi-Final	Sun, Nov 13	1:00 p.m. EST	vs. Edmonton Eskimos	L 21–24	0–1	TSN/RDS/ESPN2	Tim Hortons Field	24,182	Recap

== Roster ==
2016 Hamilton Tiger-Cats final roster
Quarterbacks: 4 Zach Collaros; 8 Jeremiah Masoli; 9 Jeff Mathews; Running backs: 32 C. J. Gable; 46 C. O. Primé; 27 Mercer Timmis; 18 Anthony Woodson; Receivers: 88 Johnny Aprile; 16 Brandon Banks; 15 John Chiles; 87 Jasper Collins; 84 Kevin Elliott; 80 Terrence Toliver; 82 Brian Tyms; 89 Spencer Watt	Offensive linemen: 64 Ryan Bomben G; 67 Peter Dyakowski G/T; 51 Mike Filer C; 58 Xavier Fulton T; 57 Brandon Revenberg G; 69 Landon Rice G/T; Defensive linemen: 99 Mike Atkinson DT; 94 Justin Capicciotti DE; 7 John Chick DE; 90 Evan Gill DT; 97 Ted Laurent DT; 91 Drake Nevis DT; 77 Louie Richardson DE; 5 Adrian Tracy DE	Linebackers: 40 Terrell Davis; 49 Larry Dean; 21 Simoni Lawrence; 42 Ron Omara; 33 Frédéric Plesius; 48 Matt Wells; Defensive backs: 35 Mike Daly; 25 Chris Davis; 20 Emanuel Davis; 31 Dominique Ellis; 30 Jay Langa; 11 Keon Raymond; 29 Jermaine Robinson; 22 Courtney Stephen	Special teams: 47 Aaron Crawford LS; 6 Brett Maher K/P; Practice roster: 44 Mitch Barnett LB; 60 Terrence Campbell T; 38 Elroy Douglas DB; 45 Geoff Hughes LB; 95 Delano Johnson DT; 14 Travis Lee DB; 37 Will Smith LB; 86 Matt Uren WR; 24 Cassius Vaughn DB; 53 Everton Williams T	Injured list: 26 Johnny Adams DB; 41 Byron Archambault LB; 28 Craig Butler DB; 81 Matt Coates WR; 83 Andy Fantuz SB; 52 Mathieu Girard C; 13 Everett Golson QB; 12 Jacory Harris QB; 1 Shane Herbert DB; 85 Mike Jones WR; 23 Beau Landry LB; 12 Kendial Lawrence RB; 56 Jeremy Lewis T; 0 Rico Murray DB; 50 Jake Olson T; 2 Chad Owens SB; 36 Ross Scheuerman RB; 39 Da'Rel Scott RB; 3 Johnny Sears DB; 59 Brian Simmons T; 17 Luke Tasker SB; 13 Demond Washington DB; Italics indicate International player

== Coaching staff ==
Hamilton Tiger-Cats Staff
Front office: Caretaker – Bob Young; Chief executive officer – Scott Mitchell; Vice president of football operations – Kent Austin; General manager – Eric Tillman; Assistant gm/director of football operations – Shawn Burke; Assistant gm/director of canadian scouting – Drew Allemang; Pro/College Scout – Spencer Zimmerman; Video co-ordinator – Matt Allemang; Head coach: Head coach – Kent Austin; Offensive coaches: Offensive coordinator and receivers – Stefan Ptaszek; Running backs and offensive quality control – Corey Grant; Offensive line – Mike Markuson	Defensive coaches: Defensive coordinator – Orlondo Steinauer; Defensive backs – James Stanley; Linebackers – Jeff Reinebold; Defensive line – Dennis McPhee; Assistant defensive – Marcello Simmons; Special teams coaches: Special teams coordinator – Jeff Reinebold; Assistant special teams – John Zamberlin; Assistant special teams – Marcello Simmons; → Coaching staff
