= List of Hamilton Tiger-Cats starting quarterbacks =

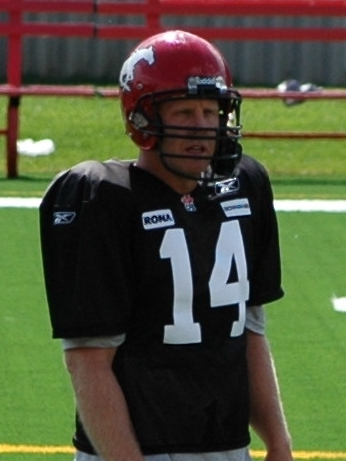
Danny McManus is the franchise all-time leader in passing yards, completions, and passing touchdowns.

The following is an incomplete list of starting quarterbacks for the Hamilton Tiger-Cats of the Canadian Football League that have started a regular season game for the team. This list includes postseason appearances since 1994, but does not include preseason games. They are listed in order of most starts with any tiebreaker being the date of each player's first start at quarterback for the Tiger-Cats.

== Regular season ==
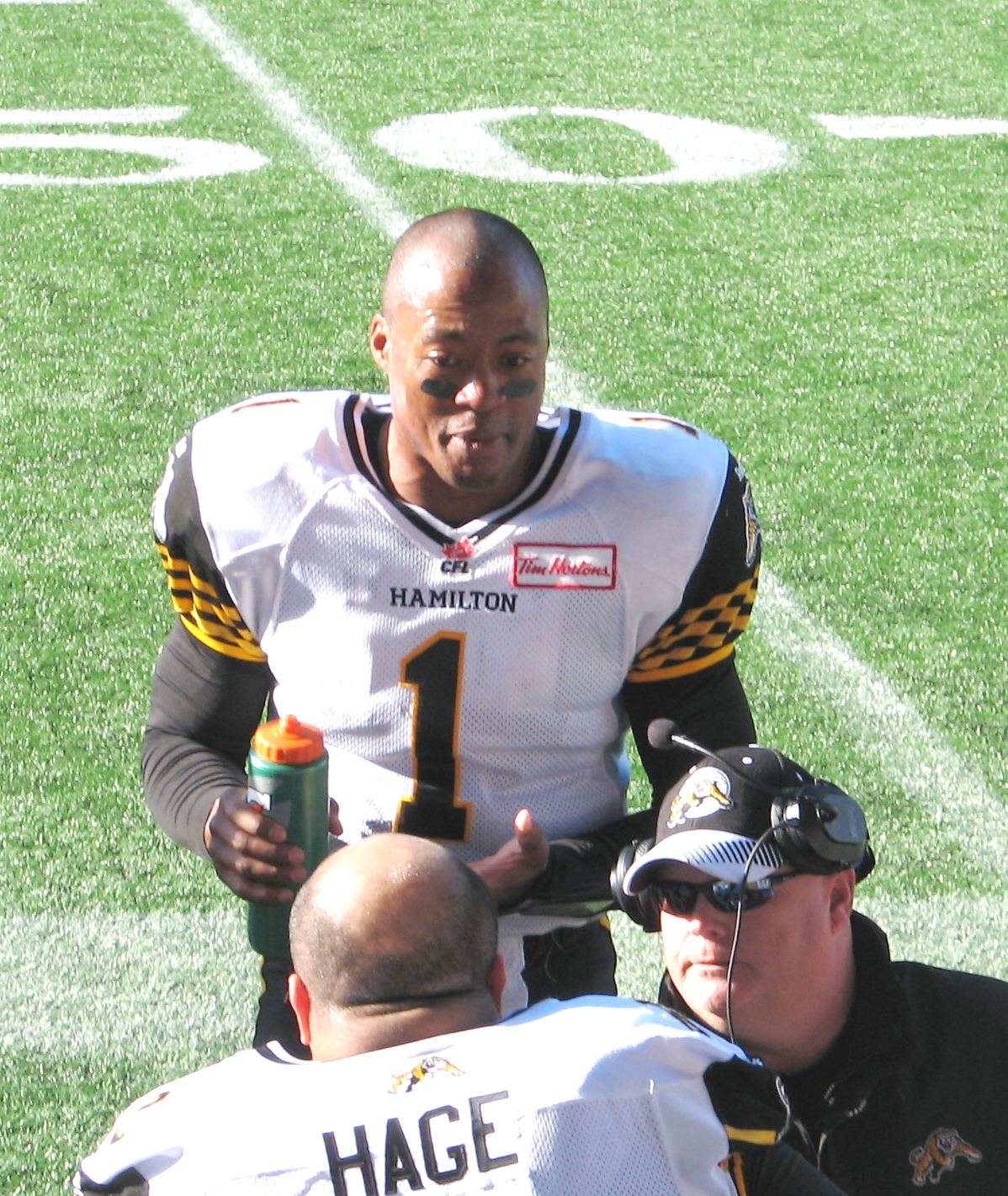
Henry Burris had the most single-season passing touchdowns in franchise history in 2012.

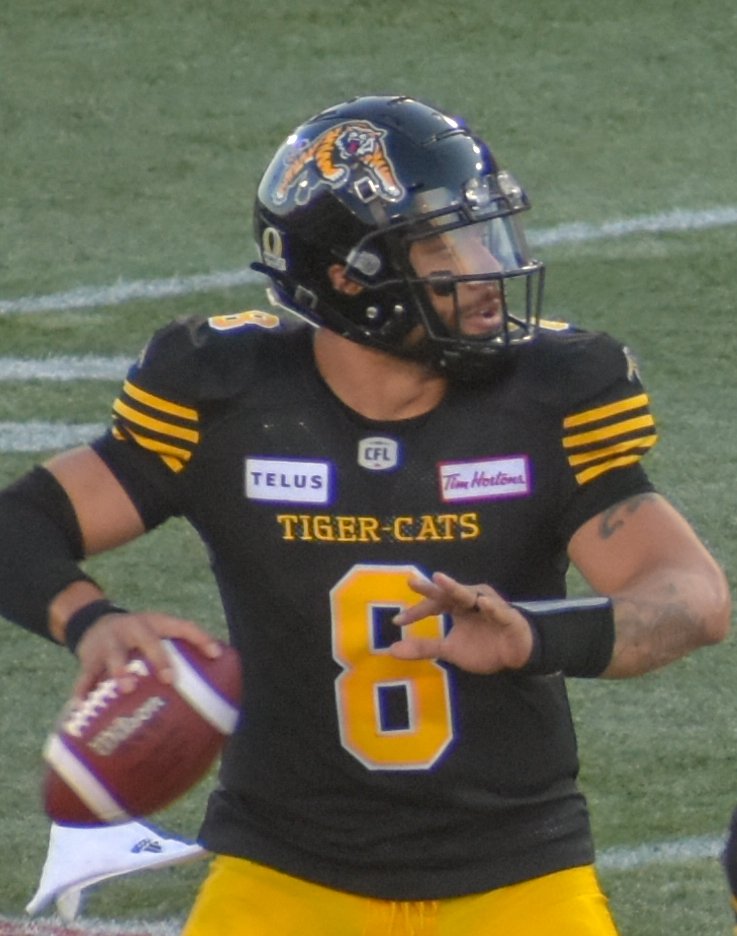
Jeremiah Masoli is fourth in passing yards in franchise history.

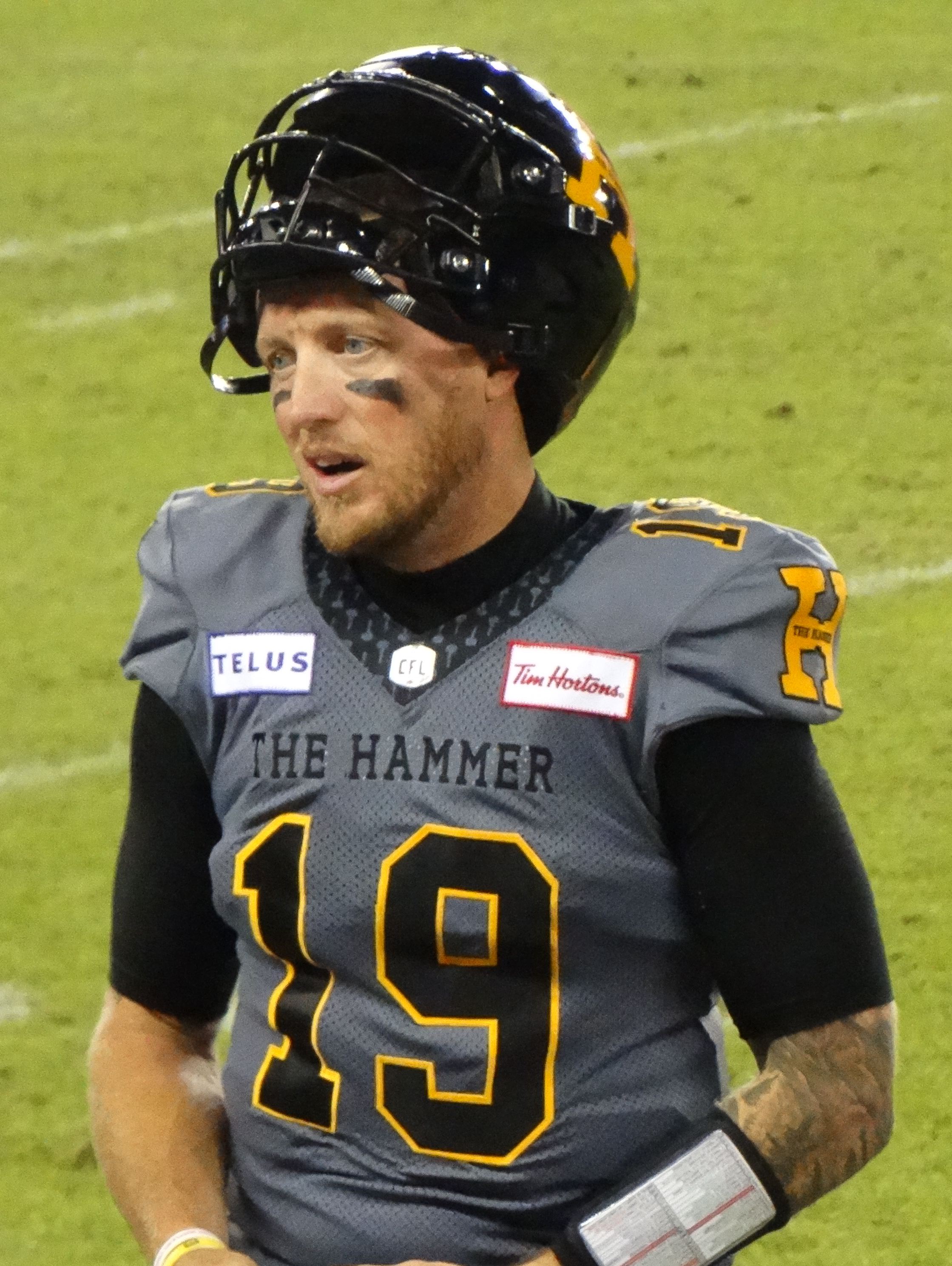
Bo Levi Mitchell had the most single-season passing yards and passing completions in franchise history in 2024.

Where known, the number of games they started during the season is listed to the right:

Season(s)	Regular season	Postseason
2026	Tre Ford (7) / Harrison Frost (6) / Bo Levi Mitchell (4) / Jake Dolegala (1)	
2025	Bo Levi Mitchell (18)	Bo Levi Mitchell (1)
2024	Bo Levi Mitchell (17) / Taylor Powell (1)	
2023	Taylor Powell (9) / Bo Levi Mitchell (6) / Matthew Shiltz (3)	Matthew Shiltz (1)
2022	Dane Evans (13) / Matthew Shiltz (4) / Jamie Newman (1)	Dane Evans (1)
2021	Jeremiah Masoli (9) / Dane Evans (3) / David Watford (2)	Jeremiah Masoli (2) / Dane Evans (1)
2020	Season cancelled due to COVID-19 pandemic	
2019	Dane Evans (11) / Jeremiah Masoli (6) / Hayden Moore (1)	Dane Evans (2)
2018	Jeremiah Masoli (17) / Dane Evans (1)	Jeremiah Masoli (2)
2017	Jeremiah Masoli (10) / Zach Collaros (8)	
2016	Zach Collaros (10) / Jeremiah Masoli (8)	Zach Collaros (1)
2015	Zach Collaros (12) / Jeff Mathews (5) / Jacory Harris (1)	Jeremiah Masoli (2)
2014	Zach Collaros (13) / Dan LeFevour (4) / Jeremiah Masoli (1)	Zach Collaros (2)
2013	Henry Burris (18)	Henry Burris (3)
2012	Henry Burris (18)	
2011	Kevin Glenn (17) / Quinton Porter (1)	Kevin Glenn (2)
2010	Kevin Glenn (18)	Kevin Glenn (1)
2009	Quinton Porter (11) / Kevin Glenn (7)	Kevin Glenn (1)
2008	Casey Printers (10) / Quinton Porter (5) / Richie Williams (3)	
2007	Jason Maas (8) / Casey Printers (6) / Richie Williams (2) / Timmy Chang (2)	
2006	Jason Maas (15) / Kevin Eakin (3)	
2005	Danny McManus (11) / Marcus Brady (3) / Kevin Eakin (3) / Khari Jones (1)	
2004	Danny McManus (18)	Danny McManus (1)
2003	Danny McManus (15) / Pete Gonzalez (3)	
2002	Danny McManus (18)	
2001	Danny McManus (17) / Cody Ledbetter (1)	Danny McManus (2)
2000	Danny McManus (16) / Todd Bankhead (1) / Billy Dicken (1)	Danny McManus (1)
1999	Danny McManus (18)	Danny McManus (3)
1998	Danny McManus (18)	Danny McManus (2)
1997	Anthony Calvillo (10) / Rickey Foggie (4) / Mike Cawley (3) / Marquel Fleetwood (1)	
1996	Anthony Calvillo (7) / Matt Dunigan (6) / Marvin Graves (2) / Mike Kerrigan (2) / Larry Jusdanis (1)	Anthony Calvillo (1)
1995	Anthony Calvillo (9) / Steve Taylor (9)	Steve Taylor (1)
1994	Timm Rosenbach (10) / Reggie Slack (5) / Todd Dillon (3)	
1993	Don McPherson (12) / Bob Torrance (4) / Todd Dillon (1) / Lee Saltz (1)	
1992	Damon Allen (18)	
1991	Todd Dillon (10) / Mike Kerrigan (7) / Don McPherson (1)	
1990	Mike Kerrigan (16) / Todd Dillon (2)	
1989	Mike Kerrigan (15) / Todd Dillon (3)	
1988	Mike Kerrigan (12) / Tom Porras (6)	
1987	Tom Porras (11) / Mike Kerrigan (4) / Ken Hobart (3)	
1986	Mike Kerrigan (13) / Ken Hobart (5)	
1985	Ken Hobart (14) / Jeff Tedford (2)	

- * - Indicates that the number of starts is not known for that year for each quarterback

== Team passer rankings ==
Quarterbacks are listed by number of starts for the Hamilton Tiger-Cats.

Name	GS	W–L–T	Comp	Att	Pct	Yards	TD	Int
Danny McManus	130	63–65–2	2,368	4,257	55.6	33,841	164	166
Bernie Faloney	98	64–31–3	1,065	2,060	51.7	17,425	121	135
Joe Zuger	78	49–27–2	814	1,618	50.3	12,676	76	95
Mike Kerrigan	71	31–39–1	1,274	2,393	53.2	17,761	97	139
Jeremiah Masoli	51	27–24–0	1,203	1,809	66.5	15,555	80	51
Tom Clements	49	27–20–2	978	1,603	61.0	13,467	82	68
Bo Levi Mitchell	45	22–23–0	1,012	1,482	68.3	12,885	83	40
Jimmy Jones	44	17–26–1	477	861	55.4	5,989	30	34
Zach Collaros	43	19–24–0	930	1,396	66.6	11,342	66	32
Kevin Glenn	42	21–21–0	936	1,479	63.3	12,146	70	41
