= Jonathan Langa =

Canadian gridiron football player (born 1990)

Jay Langa
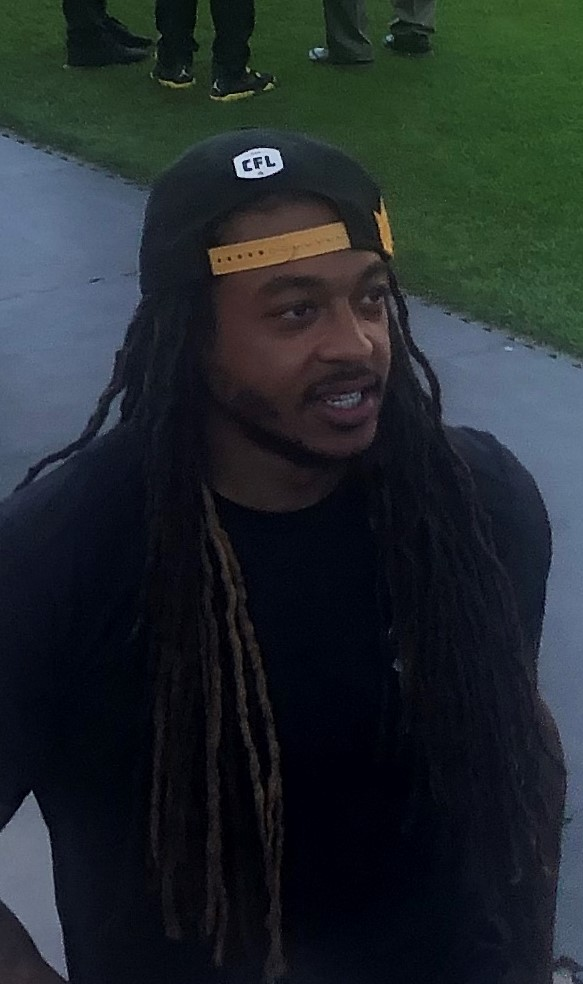
- Langa with the Hamilton Tiger-Cats in 2019

Personal information
- Born: November 15, 1990 (age 35); Etobicoke, Ontario, Canada
- Listed height: 5 ft 9 in (1.75 m)
- Listed weight: 214 lb (97 kg)

Career information
- Position: Defensive back (No. 7, 30)
- University: Saint Mary's
- CFL draft: 2015: 3rd round, 20th overall pick

Career history

Playing
- 2015–2019: Hamilton Tiger-Cats

Coaching
- 2025: York Lions (Defensive backs coach)

Awards and highlights
- Presidents' Trophy (2014)

Career CFL statistics
- Games played: 62
- Defensive tackles: 2
- Special teams tackles: 59
- Stats at CFL.ca

Jonathan Langa (born November 15, 1990) is a Canadian former professional football defensive back. He played for the Hamilton Tiger-Cats of the Canadian Football League (CFL) for five seasons.

== University career ==
Langa played CIS football for the Saint Mary's Huskies at linebacker from 2012 to 2014. He played in 23 games over three seasons where he recorded 125 tackles, 61 assisted tackles, 2.5 sacks, two forced fumbles, and two fumble recoveries. In his final year in 2014, Langa led the nation in total tackles with 80 which also set an Atlantic University Sport record. In that season, he also recorded 0.5 sacks, two forced fumbles, and one fumble recovery as he was named the CIS Defensive Player of the Year.

== Professional career ==
Langa was drafted by the Hamilton Tiger-Cats in the third round, with the 20th overall pick, of the 2015 CFL draft. He dressed in 16 games in the 2015 season where he had eight special teams tackles. In 2016, he played in just 10 games, but recorded 10 special teams tackles and also made his playoff in the team's East Semi-Final loss to the Edmonton Eskimos.

In the 2017 season, Langa played in all 18 regular season games where he recorded two defensive tackles and a career-high 24 special teams tackles. On January 8, 2018, it was announced that he had re-signed with the Tiger-Cats on a two-year contract extension. He played in 15 regular season games in 2018 where he had 14 special teams tackles and also recorded another two special teams tackles in the team's two playoff games.

Langa spent most of the 2019 season on the injured list as he played in just three games where he had three special teams tackles. He was, however, healthy for the post-season and played in both the East Final and the 107th Grey Cup, but did not record any stats in the team's loss to the Winnipeg Blue Bombers. He became a free agent when his contract expired on February 11, 2020, but did not sign with another team. Over the course of his five-year career, Langa played in 62 games and recorded two defensive tackles and 59 special teams tackles.

== Coaching career ==
In 2025, Langa joined head coach Dexter Janke of the York Lions to serve as the team's assistant defensive backs coach. He served in that capacity for one year.
