= Mike Daly (Canadian football) =

Canadian football player and coach (born 1990)

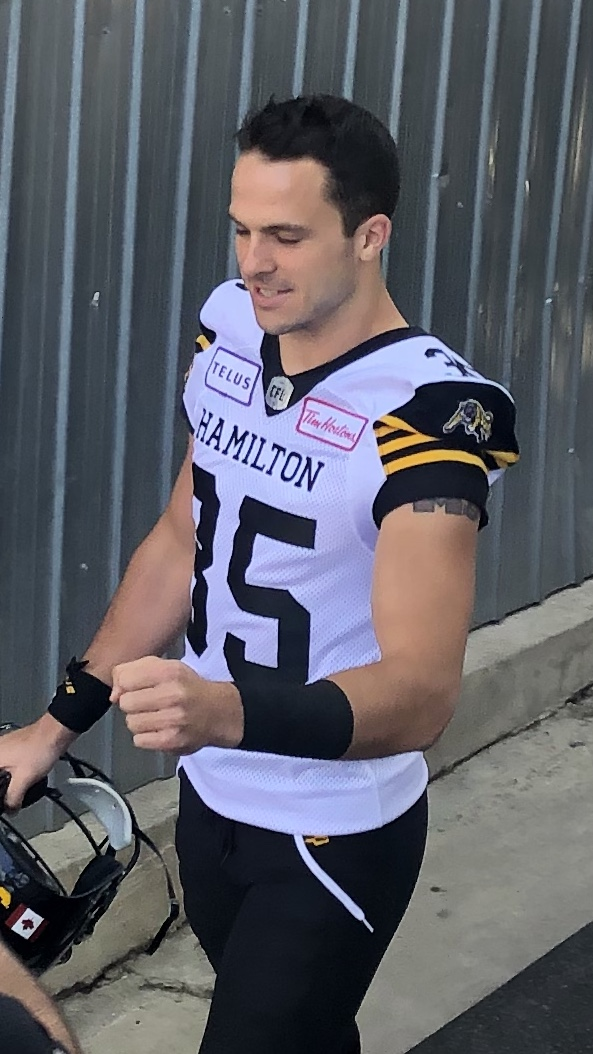
- Daly before a Tiger-Cats game in 2019.

Wilfrid Laurier Golden Hawks
- Position: Special Teams Assistant
- Roster status: Active
- CFL status: National

Personal information
- Born: May 30, 1990 (age 36); Kitchener, Ontario
- Listed height: 6 ft 1 in (1.85 m)
- Listed weight: 189 lb (86 kg)

Career information
- High school: Forest Heights C. I.
- University: McMaster
- CFL draft: 2013: 6th round, 45th overall pick

Career history

Playing
- 2013–2022: Hamilton Tiger-Cats

Coaching
- 2022–present: Wilfrid Laurier Golden Hawks

Awards and highlights
- Tom Pate Memorial Award (2021); 47th Vanier Cup Champion
- Stats at CFL.ca

Michael Daly (born May 30, 1990) is a Canadian former professional football defensive back and is currently the special teams assistant coach for the Wilfrid Laurier Golden Hawks of U Sports football. He spent nine years with the Hamilton Tiger-Cats of the Canadian Football League (CFL).

== University career ==
Daly played CIS football for the McMaster Marauders from 2009 to 2013. He played in 38 games over those five years and recorded 83 solo tackles, 24 assisted tackles, 10 interceptions, and one quarterback sack. He was part of the Marauders' 2011 and 2012 Yates Cup conference champion teams. Daly has also won a Vanier Cup national championship with the Marauders – the first in program history – where he recorded one interception and an assisted tackle in the 47th Vanier Cup game. The following year, in 2012, he was named a Second Team All-Canadian although the Marauders lost the 48th Vanier Cup game in a rematch with the Laval Rouge et Or.

== Professional career ==
After finishing his fourth year of college eligibility, Daly was drafted by the Hamilton Tiger-Cats 45th overall in the sixth round of the 2013 CFL draft and signed with the team on May 27, 2013. He attended training camp with the team in 2013, but elected to return to the Marauders for his final season of CIS eligibility and was transferred to the Tiger-Cats' suspended list.

After finishing his CIS career, Daly re-signed with the Tiger-Cats on February 28, 2014. He began the 2014 season on the team's practice roster, but was soon elevated to the active roster in time to play in his first professional game on July 18, 2014, against the Calgary Stampeders. He played in all 16 of the Tiger-Cats' remaining regular season games, where he recorded nine special teams tackles. He also played in both post-season games, including playing in his first Grey Cup game where he recorded three special teams tackles, which ended in a loss to the Stampeders in the 102nd Grey Cup.

In 2015, Daly established himself more on defense in his sophomore season, earning his first professional start on July 2, 2015, in a 52–26 win over the Winnipeg Blue Bombers. In that game, he recorded his first defensive tackle, and had a total of four, while also notching his first interception in the same game. He finished the year playing in 15 regular season games, starting six, and had 15 defensive tackles, seven special teams tackles, three interceptions, and one sack. This included a career game on August 21, 2015, against the Edmonton Eskimos where he had seven defensive tackles, two interceptions, a forced fumble and his first CFL sack. After the season ended, he signed a two-year contract extension with the Tiger-Cats on December 20, 2016.

Daly played in all 18 regular season games during the 2016 season, where he started three at defensive back. He finished the year with nine defensive tackles, 13 special teams tackles, and one interception. He played in the first two games of 2017, but suffered a shoulder injury and subsequently sat out the remainder of the year.

In 2018, he had his most productive season to date, playing in all 18 regular season games and starting in 17 of them. He had a career-high 53 defensive tackles, three interceptions, and one special teams tackle. He also scored his first career touchdown after intercepting BC Lions quarterback Jonathan Jennings and returning it 58 yards for the score on September 29, 2018. He also started in both of the Tiger-Cats' post-season games where he recorded six defensive tackles. He was also named as Hamilton's nominee for the Jake Gaudaur Veterans' Trophy in 2018. Following the 2018 season, he re-signed with the Tiger-Cats on January 30, 2019.

Daly moved back to a reserve role for the 2019 season where he started just three out of his 18 regular season games played. Seeing more time on special teams, he tallied a career-high 18 special teams tackles, while also recording 16 defensive tackles and one interception. The Tiger-Cats finished with a franchise-best 15–3 record in 2019 and Daly played in both of the teams' post-season games, including his second appearance in a Grey Cup game. However, the Tiger-Cats would lose the 107th Grey Cup game to the Winnipeg Blue Bombers, where Daly had one special teams tackle in the championship game. He re-signed with the Tiger-Cats on December 30, 2019. He signed a contract extension with the Tiger-Cats on December 29, 2020. He played in just four regular season games in 2021 where he had eight defensive tackles. He played in the 108th Grey Cup where he again had one special teams tackle, but the Tiger-Cats lost to the Winnipeg Blue Bombers in overtime. He became a free agent upon the expiry of his contract on February 8, 2022.

On October 26, 2022, it was announced that Daly had re-signed with the Tiger-Cats to a practice roster agreement. He did not dress in a game and became a free agent on November 7, 2022, when the Tiger-Cats' season ended.

== Coaching career ==
On June 16, 2022, it was announced that Daly had joined the Wilfrid Laurier Golden Hawks as the team's special teams assistant coach.

== Personal life ==
Daly is married to Samantha, with whom they have a son and a daughter.
