= Brian Tyms =

American gridiron football player (born 1989)

No. 85, 84, 18, 82
- Position: Wide receiver

Personal information
- Born: February 21, 1989 (age 37); Seattle, Washington, U.S.
- Listed height: 6 ft 3 in (1.91 m)
- Listed weight: 207 lb (94 kg)

Career information
- High school: Dillard (Fort Lauderdale, Florida)
- College: Florida A&M
- NFL draft: 2012: undrafted

Career history
- San Francisco 49ers (2012)*; Miami Dolphins (2012–2013)*; Cleveland Browns (2013); New England Patriots (2014–2015); Indianapolis Colts (2016)*; Hamilton Tiger-Cats (2016–2017); Toronto Argonauts (2017–2018); Orlando Apollos (2019)*; Salt Lake Stallions (2019)
- * Offseason or practice squad member only

Awards and highlights
- Super Bowl champion (XLIX); Grey Cup champion (2017)

Career NFL statistics
- Receptions: 7
- Receiving yards: 94
- Receiving touchdowns: 1
- Stats at Pro Football Reference
- Stats at CFL.ca

Brian Gordon Tyms (born February 21, 1989) is an American former professional football player who was a wide receiver in the National Football League (NFL) and Canadian Football League (CFL). He played college football for the Florida A&M Rattlers. Tyms signed with the San Francisco 49ers as undrafted free agent in 2012. He was also a member of the Miami Dolphins, Cleveland Browns, New England Patriots, Indianapolis Colts, Hamilton Tiger-Cats, Toronto Argonauts, Orlando Apollos, and Salt Lake Stallions.

== Early life ==
Tyms was born in Kent, Washington. He was raised as a foster child, growing up in Fort Lauderdale, Florida.

== College career ==
Tyms played college football at Florida A&M University for the Rattlers.

== Professional career ==
=== San Francisco 49ers and Miami Dolphins ===
Tyms went undrafted in the 2012 NFL draft. During the 2012 preseason, Tyms was on the practice squad for the San Francisco 49ers.

In September 2012, Tyms signed with the Miami Dolphins off the 49ers' practice squad.

=== Cleveland Browns ===
On October 22, 2013, Tyms signed with the Browns. After spending time on the practice squad, Tyms was elevated to the active roster on December 4, 2013, after defensive end Desmond Bryant was placed on the non-football illness list. He was released by the Browns after the NFL informed the team he would be suspended for the first four games of the 2014 season due to violating the league's substance abuse policy.

=== New England Patriots ===
On July 27, 2014, Tyms signed with the New England Patriots. On August 7, in a preseason game against the Washington Redskins, Tyms scored his first touchdown as a Patriot. Additionally, he caught 5 passes for 119 yards. After the preseason, Tyms was informed he would be on the 53-man roster following his suspension in April for violating the league's substance abuse policy. Tyms was activated to the 53-man roster on October 6, 2014. Tyms scored his first NFL touchdown on October 12 on a 43-yard pass from Tom Brady. Prior to the touchdown, Tyms had two career NFL receptions for 12 yards. Although he was inactive, Tyms earned a Super Bowl ring as the Patriots defeated the Seattle Seahawks 28–24 in Super Bowl XLIX.

Tyms was placed on the Patriots' injured reserve on August 25, 2015, and the Patriots did not tender him a contract at the conclusion of the league year.

=== Indianapolis Colts ===
On April 7, 2016, Tyms signed with the Indianapolis Colts.

=== Hamilton Tiger-Cats ===
On October 24, 2016, Tyms was signed to the Hamilton Tiger-Cats' practice roster. Tyms played in the final game of the regular season and the Tiger-Cats' lone playoff game. In his one regular season game, he caught four passes for 33 yards with 1 touchdown. He had a breakout performance in the Eastern Division Semifinal against the Eskimos, catching a game high 8 passes for 114 yards. Nevertheless, the Tiger-Cats were defeated 24-21, thus ending their 2016 season. He signed a further contract with the Tiger-Cats in February 2017. In the 2017 season, Tyms played 8 games and hauled in 25 passes for 204 yards. He was released in September 2017.

=== Toronto Argonauts ===
On September 14, 2017, Tyms was signed to the Toronto Argonauts practice roster. The Argos went on to win the 105th Grey Cup championship game, making Tyms a rare player who has won both a Super Bowl and a Grey Cup. He signed an extension, but was released by the team on July 2, 2018, following two games, in which he made 7 catches for 55 yards.

=== Orlando Apollos ===
Tyms was announced as having joined the Orlando Apollos of the Alliance of American Football in 2018. He was released at the conclusion of training camp.

=== Salt Lake Stallions ===
On February 19, 2019, Tyms signed with the Salt Lake Stallions. In the six games Tyms played in prior to the league suspending operations, he caught 11 passes for 82 yards. The league ceased operations in April 2019.

== Career statistics ==
Legend
	Won the Super Bowl
**Bold**	Career high

=== NFL ===
Year	Team	Games		Receiving				
Year	Team	GP	GS	Rec	Yds	Avg	Lng	TD
2013	CLE	7	0	2	12	6.0	6	0
2014	NE	**11**	**2**	**5**	**82**	**16.4**	**43**	**1**
Career:		18	2	7	94	13.4	43	1

=== CFL ===
Year	Team	Games	Receiving				
Year	Team	GP	Rec	Yds	Avg	Lng	TD
2016	HAM	1	4	33	**8.3**	**24**	**1**
2017	HAM	**9**	**25**	**204**	8.2	**24**	0
2018	TOR	2	7	55	7.9	16	0
Career:		12	36	292	8.1	24	1
