= C. J. Gable =

American gridiron football player (born 1987)

C.J. Gable
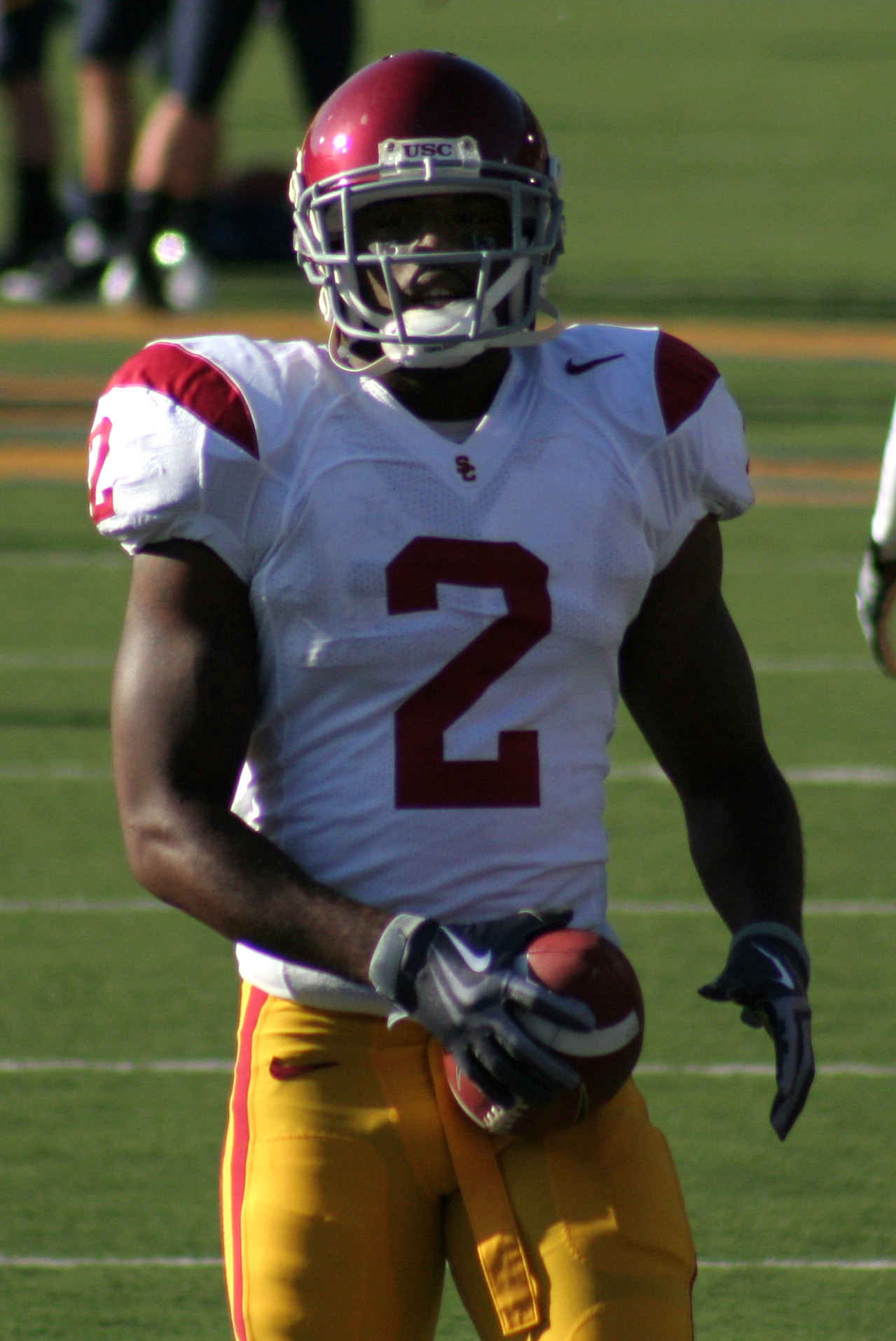
- Gable warming up before a game against California

No. 2, 32, 39
- Position: Running back

Personal information
- Born: October 19, 1987 (age 39); Sylmar, California, U.S.
- Listed height: 6 ft 0 in (1.83 m)
- Listed weight: 220 lb (100 kg)

Career information
- High school: Sylmar
- College: Southern California

Career history
- 2011: New Orleans Saints*
- 2011: Denver Broncos*
- 2013: Nebraska Danger*
- 2013–2017: Hamilton Tiger-Cats
- 2017–2019: Edmonton Eskimos
- * Offseason or practice squad member only

Awards and highlights
- Frank M. Gibson Trophy (2013); 2× CFL East All-Star (2013, 2016)
- Stats at Pro Football Reference
- Stats at CFL.ca

C. J. Gable (born Carl Gable Jr. October 19, 1987) is an American former professional football running back. He was signed by the New Orleans Saints as an undrafted free agent in 2011. He played college football for the University of Southern California Trojans. He was also a member of the Denver Broncos (NFL), Nebraska Danger (IFL), and Hamilton Tiger-Cats and Edmonton Eskimos (CFL).

== Early life ==
Gable attended Sylmar High School in Sylmar, California. By his sophomore season, he had garnered attention for his play at free safety. He was a 2005 Parade High School All-American before joining the Trojans for the 2006 season. At Sylmar, as a sophomore he had a total of 80 carries, 509 yards, 7 touchdowns as a part-time running back. As a junior, now the full-time running back he had a total of 180 carries, 2,023 yards, 23 touchdowns. As a senior, he had a breakout season having a total of 202 carries, 2,086 yards, 27 touchdowns and came up just short of the school rushing record of 2,095 set by Ryen Carew in 2002. He is the only running back to rush for over 2,000 yards back to back in Sylmar Charter High School history.

== College career ==
Gable became the first freshman to ever start an opener at running back for USC when he started at Arkansas in 2006. Gable suffered a season-ending injury in the third game of the 2007 season. He ran a 4.68-second 40-yard dash in the summer of 2008. Gable competed for playing time at running back and kick returner as a sophomore in 2008. Gable originally wore #25 when he began his USC career, but had it changed to #2, his number in high school; when he arrived at USC, #2 was already worn by wide receiver Steve Smith. However, Smith left for the NFL after the 2006 season and Gable was able to reclaim his old number.

He decided not to declare for the 2009 NFL draft and returned to USC as a fourth-year junior.

Gable ran for 617 yards and 8 touchdowns in 2008, while also returning 7 kicks for 196 yards and a 93-yard touchdown return against Stanford. In 2009, he ran for 102 yards on 24 carries. Gable also returned 19 kicks for 348 yards in '09.

== Professional career ==
Pre-draft measurables
Height	Weight	40-yard dash	10-yard split	20-yard split	20-yard shuttle	Three-cone drill	Vertical jump	Broad jump	Bench press
5 ft 11 1/8 in (1.81 m)	212 lb (96 kg)	4.58 s	1.61 s	2.69 s	4.61 s	7.27 s	32.5 in (0.83 m)	9 ft 4 in (2.84 m)	22 reps
All values from Pro Day

=== New Orleans Saints ===
Gable went undrafted in the 2011 NFL draft. On July 26, 2011, Gable signed as an undrafted free agent with the New Orleans Saints. He was waived on August 5, 2011.

=== Denver Broncos ===
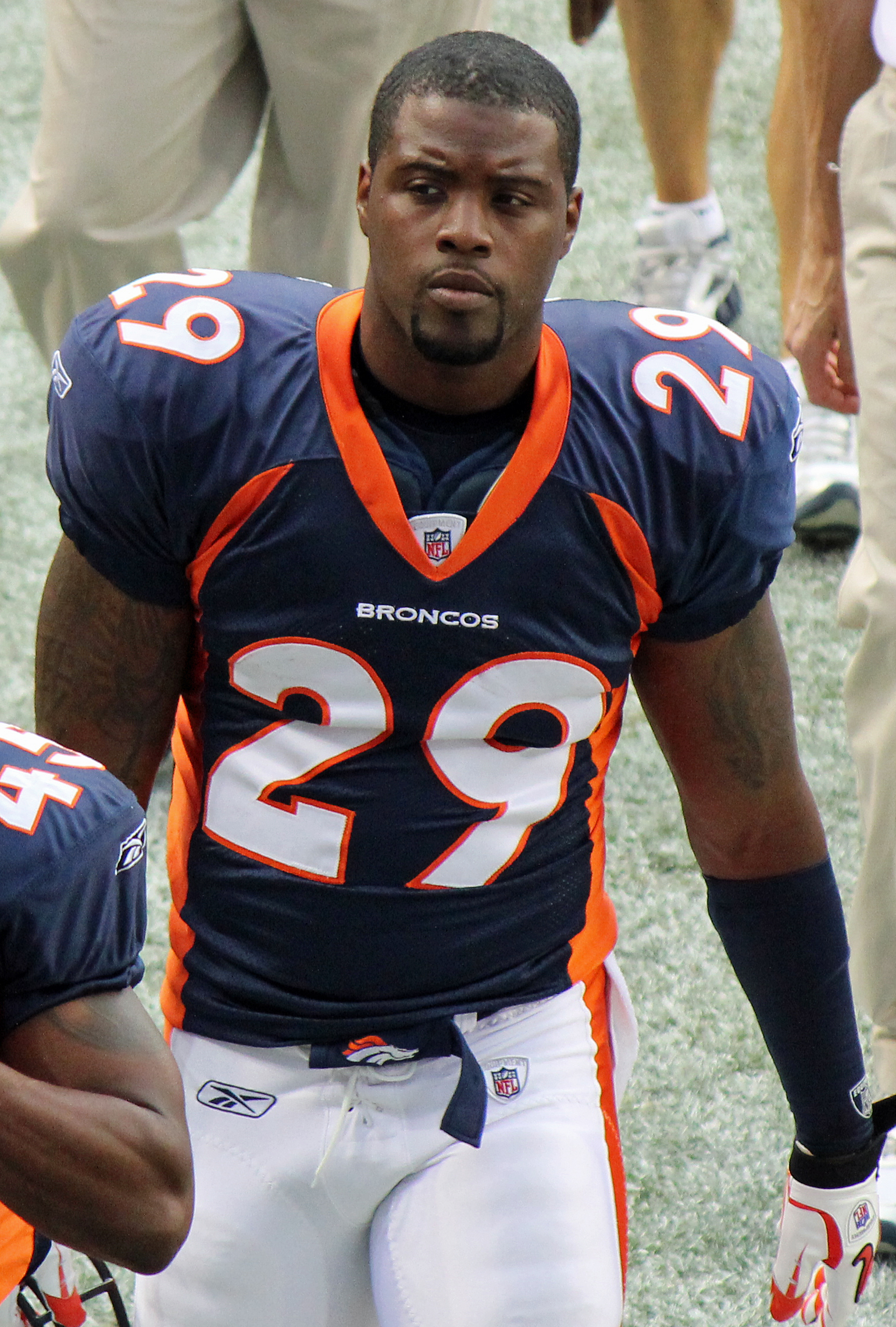
Gable during his brief tenure with the Denver Broncos

On August 6, 2011, Gable signed with the Denver Broncos, but was waived on August 29.

=== Nebraska Danger ===
Gable was signed by the Nebraska Danger of the Indoor Football League on October 24, 2012, but was released on February 28, 2013.

=== Hamilton Tiger-Cats ===
Gable was signed by the Hamilton Tiger-Cats of the Canadian Football League on April 2, 2013. CJ Gable had a strong first season in the CFL. He was a threat both rushing the ball and receiving the ball out of the backfield. Gable totaled 782 rushing yards on 130 carries, with 7 touchdowns as well as 598 receiving yards on 54 catches with 5 touchdowns. He was the 2013 winner of the Frank M. Gibson Trophy as runner up for the CFL's Most Outstanding Rookie Award.

Gable's second season in the CFL was marred by injury. He only played in the first 6 games of the season before injuring his foot and shoulder. He wound up with just 138 rushing yards on 30 carries (4.6 average) for 2 touchdowns, with 18 catches for 224 yards and 2 more touchdowns. In late February 2015, Gable and the Tiger-Cats agreed to a contract extension which will keep Gable in Hamilton through the 2017 CFL season. His third season with the Ti-Cats was similar to his second season in that he missed significant playing time due to injury. The 2016 season was a return to form for Gable, as he played in 15 games for the Ti-Cats, rushing the ball 126 times for 693 yards (5.5 average) and 3 touchdowns. He also caught 39 passes for 404 yards and one receiving touchdown. Gable earned divisional All-Star honours for the second time in his career as a result of his strong play in 2016. Gable returned in 2017 as the team's primary running back, playing in nine of the club's first 13 games. Gable carried the ball 74 times for 466 yards with 5 touchdowns for the Ti-Cats in 2017.

=== Edmonton Eskimos ===
On October 2, 2017, the Edmonton Eskimos acquired C.J. Gable via trade, in exchange for two unnamed players from their negotiation list. In four regular season games with the Eskimos Gable carried the ball 72 times for 367 yards (5.1 avg) with two touchdowns (he also caught nine passes for 99 yards and one touchdown). In two playoff games Gable had 28 rushing attempts for 161 yards with three touchdowns. Following the season he was re-signed by the Eskimos to a two-year deal. Although Edmonton missed the playoffs with a 9-9 record, Gable's 2018 proved to be a career year, rushing for his first 1,000 season. In 16 games, Gable had 196 rushes for 1,063 yards with 7 touchdowns, in addition to 34 catches for 212 yards and another score. Gable had another strong season in 2019, carrying the ball a career high 205 times eclipsing 1000 rushing yards for the second consecutive season. Following the season Gable was not re-signed by the Eskimos and became a free agent on February 11, 2020.

Gable signed a one-day contract with the Tiger-Cats to retire as a member of the team on April 1, 2021.

== CFL career statistics ==
		Rushing						Receiving
Year	Team	GP	Car	Yards	Avg	Long	TD	Rec	Yards	Avg	Long	TD
2013	HAM	15	130	782	6.0	34	7	55	600	10.9	42	5
2014	HAM	7	30	138	4.6	47	2	18	224	12.4	82	2
2015	HAM	5	47	293	6.2	47	0	10	82	8.2	17	0
2016	HAM	15	126	693	5.5	53	3	39	405	10.4	35	1
2017	HAM	9	74	466	6.3	46	5	25	186	7.4	28	0
2017	EDM	4	72	367	5.1	19	2	9	99	11.0	35	1
2018	EDM	16	196	1,063	5.4	61	7	34	212	6.2	22	1
2019	EDM	14	205	1,001	4.9	34	2	53	417	7.9	29	1
CFL totals		85	880	4,803	5.5	61	28	243	2,225	9.2	82	11
