= Andy Fantuz =

Canadian football player (born 1983)

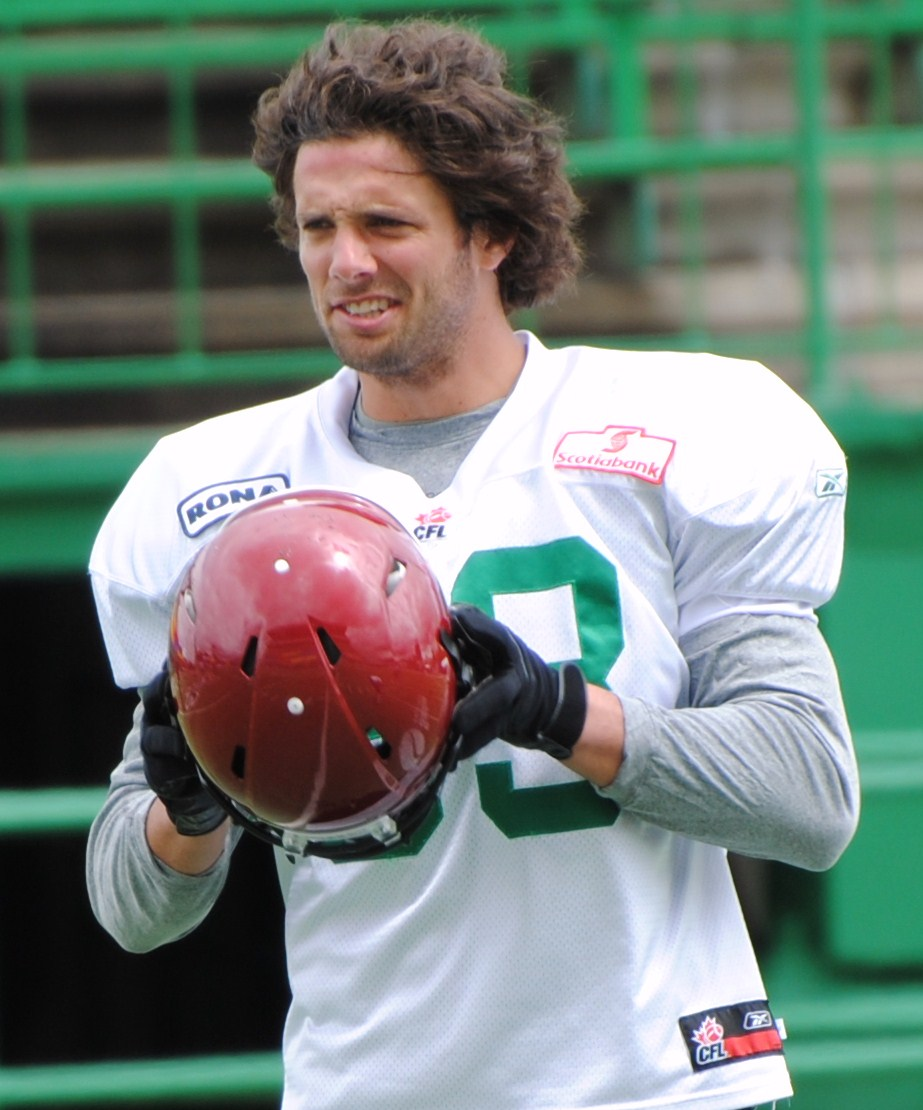
- Fantuz with the Saskatchewan Roughriders in 2010

No. 83
- Positions: Slotback, wide receiver

Personal information
- Born: December 18, 1983 (age 42); Chatham, Ontario, Canada
- Listed height: 6 ft 4 in (1.93 m)
- Listed weight: 221 lb (100 kg)

Career information
- High school: John McGregor
- University: Western Ontario
- CFL draft: 2006: 1st round, 3rd overall pick

Career history

Playing
- 2006–2010: Saskatchewan Roughriders
- 2011: Chicago Bears*
- 2011: Saskatchewan Roughriders
- 2012–2016: Hamilton Tiger-Cats
- 2017: Hamilton Tiger-Cats
- * Offseason or practice squad member only

Operations
- 2017: Hamilton Tiger-Cats

Awards and highlights
- Grey Cup champion (2007); Dick Suderman Trophy (2007); CFL's Most Outstanding Canadian Award (2010); Hec Crighton Trophy (2005); Peter Gorman Trophy (2002); CFL All-Star (2010); CFL West All-Star (2010)
- Stats at Pro Football Reference
- Stats at CFL.ca

Andrew Fantuz (born December 18, 1983) is a Canadian former professional football slotback. Fantuz spent the majority of his professional career with the Saskatchewan Roughriders and the Hamilton Tiger-Cats of the Canadian Football League (CFL). He played for the Riders for six seasons after he was drafted by them in the first round of the 2006 CFL draft. He then played six seasons for the Tiger-Cats. Fantuz was also signed by the Chicago Bears in 2011. He played CIS football for the Western Ontario Mustangs.

== Early life ==
Fantuz attended John McGregor Secondary School from 1997 to 2002, where he played football and basketball. He also played for the Essex County Ravens of the Ontario Varsity Football League.

== University career ==
Andy Fantuz attended the University of Western Ontario from 2002 to 2005, where he established himself as one of the best receivers in Canadian Interuniversity Sport history. Fantuz was awarded the CIS Rookie of the year award in 2002 with 1300 receiving yards (a single season record) and nine touchdowns. Fantuz won the Hec Crighton Trophy as the top player in the CIS in 2005, finishing with 44 catches for 825 yards to become only the fifth receiver to win the award and first since Calgary's Don Blair in 1995. He finished his university career as the OUA and CIS leader with 189 receptions for 4,123 yards and 41 touchdown receptions. He was a four-time CIS all-Canadian and four-time OUA all-star while being named to the first-team all-Canadian in 2002, 2004, and 2005. On January 21, 2006, Fantuz represented Eastern Canada in the East-West Shrine Game which showcases the best college talent in the United States and with invitees from Canada.

== Professional career ==
=== Saskatchewan Roughriders ===
While many thought that he could go first overall in the 2006 CFL draft, Andy Fantuz was chosen in the first round and third overall by the Saskatchewan Roughriders. After the draft, Fantuz tried out for the Detroit Lions in May 2006, but was not offered a contract and, as such, signed a one-year plus an option contract with Saskatchewan on May 20, 2006. Because he had signed the contract late, he missed a beginning portion of the 2006 training camp.

Fantuz was integrated slowly into the Roughriders offence in 2006, and caught his first pass against Toronto on July 22, 2006. He made his first start against the Hamilton Tiger-Cats in week 10 and started the last nine games of the season as well as two playoff games. He scored his first touchdown in a bizarre play against the BC Lions on September 24, 2006. Quarterback Kerry Joseph was rushing towards the endzone deep in BC territory when he was tackled from behind and fumbled the ball forward. Fantuz promptly jumped on the ball in the endzone, culminating in his first CFL touchdown, which counted as a rushing touchdown by CFL rules. The same game went into overtime, with Fantuz catching his first touchdown reception and winning the game for the Roughriders, meaning that he got his first rushing and receiving touchdown in the same game. He had his first 100-yard receiving game in week 20 against the Edmonton Eskimos. Fantuz finished the season with 30 catches for 408 yards, 3 receiving touchdowns, and 1 rushing touchdown. On November 30, 2006, Fantuz agreed to a two-year plus an option contract.

The 2007 season was presumably a promising one for Fantuz as the media and coaching staff alike were expecting big things from the sophomore receiver. However, the sophomore slump took its toll on Fantuz as numerous dropped balls at critical junctures led to his demotion from the starting line-up in week 5 by head coach Kent Austin. After catching just 17 balls for 201 yards through the first eight games, Fantuz had a turnaround game against Winnipeg with four reception for 96 yards. He continued his strong play with a 7 catch – 142 yard performance against the Montreal Alouettes, filling in for Matt Dominguez who was injured in the Banjo Bowl. On October 14, 2007, he had a blowout game with seven catches for 240 receiving yards and three touchdowns against the Hamilton Tiger-Cats. It was the third best receiving yardage game in team history and tied for the best touchdown performance by a Roughrider in a single game. As a result, he was named the Canadian Player of the Month for September. Fantuz finished the season just short of 1,000 yards with 978 receiving yards and seven touchdowns. He was the Roughriders' nomination for Most Outstanding Canadian. In three playoff games, Fantuz had 16 catches for 263 yards and two touchdowns, including four catches for 70 yards and one touchdown in the 95th Grey Cup. Because of his performance in the Grey Cup game, he was named the Grey Cup's Most Valuable Canadian after the Roughriders won their third championship.

In 2008, Andy Fantuz had an excellent start to the season with 24 catches for 328 yards and was on pace for his first 1000-yard season. However, in a game against Toronto, Fantuz suffered a broken fibula, the smaller, non-weight bearing bone in his left leg while being tackled in the fourth quarter of the July 27, 2008, 28–22 victory. He was placed on the nine-game injured list and did not return until week 18 versus the Edmonton Eskimos. In total, he played seven games and finished the regular season with 36 catches for 488 yards and three touchdowns. He also attempted one deep pass to Weston Dressler but was intercepted in a game versus Hamilton. Despite playing in only seven games, he led the offence with six defensive tackles. He had two catches for 39 yards in the Roughriders' West-Semi Final loss to the BC Lions.

Once again, Fantuz had a good start to the season, on pace for just under 1000 receiving yards, with 219 yards and one touchdown, but was injured in the week four match-up with the Edmonton Eskimos. He returned for the Banjo Bowl against the Winnipeg Blue Bombers and caught two passes for 64 yards and a touchdown, which was thrown by fellow receiver, Jason Armstead, on a gadget play. He had an outstanding outing in the overtime game against the Calgary Stampeders, contributing 10 catches for a season-high 149 yards and a game-tying touchdown. He had another dominant game against the Stampeders in the final game of the season with 12 catches for 123 yards, which was the highest reception total by a Roughrider since Curtis Marsh had 13 in 2001. Fantuz finished the season with a career-high 67 receptions for 882 yards and three touchdowns and was tied with Chris Getzlaf for the team lead in two-point conversions with two. In the 2009 West Final, he had a game-high five receptions for 89 yards and one touchdown, which was part of the 27–17 win over the Stampeders that featured all Roughrider scoring by Canadian players. In the 2009 Grey Cup, Fantuz had a team-high five catches for 67 yards and a touchdown, which wound up being a 28–27 loss to the Montreal Alouettes.

On October 15, 2009, Fantuz stated that he had verbally agreed to a two-year contract extension with the Roughriders, but would examine his NFL options before February 15, 2009. If he did not sign with an NFL team by then, he would sign a one-year plus an option contract with the Roughriders. On February 12, 2010, it was officially announced that Fantuz had re-signed with the Roughriders.

=== Chicago Bears ===
On February 4, 2011, Fantuz signed a future contract with the Chicago Bears for the 2011 NFL season. He was waived on September 2. In two preseason games with the Bears, Fantuz recorded two receptions for 19 yards.

=== Saskatchewan Roughriders (II) ===
On September 7, 2011, Fantuz rejoined the Saskatchewan Roughriders and played his first game of the season on September 11 making 2 catches for 47 yards. As a result of his time with the Chicago Bears (missing half the CFL season) and a lingering ankle injury Fantuz finished the season with only 175 yards receiving on 13 catches having only played in 4 games.

=== Hamilton Tiger-Cats ===
On February 17, 2012, Fantuz signed a four-year contract with the Hamilton Tiger-Cats. In his first season in with the Tiger-Cats Fantuz played in 17 of the 18 regular season games and amassed 971 receiving yards and a career-high 8 touchdowns. Fantuz missed a significant portion of the 2015 season with an injury. Fantuz set a personal best for most receptions in a season when he caught 101 in 17 games during the 2016 CFL season. He missed the final game of the season after being diagnosed with a torn ACL. After recovering from his injury Fantuz only played in three games for the Ti-Cats in 2017, catching six passes for 55 yards. Fantuz announced his retirement from professional football on July 19, 2018.

== Administrative career ==
On May 18, 2017, it was announced that Fantuz had re-joined the Tiger-Cats, but in an administrative role as the team's player development coordinator. Fantuz returned to a playing role, re-signing with the team, on September 18, 2017.

== Fantuz Flakes ==
During the Summer of 2010, as part of their "100 years of The Roughriders" promotional campaign, Federated Co-op Ltd. released a breakfast cereal under the name "Fantuz Flakes". The box featured an image of Fantuz on the front, and the cereal itself was similar to Oatmeal Crisp in texture and colour.

== Career statistics ==
Receiving		Regular season						Playoffs
Year	Team	Games	No.	Yards	Avg	Long	TD	Games	No.	Yards	Avg	Long	TD
2006	SSK	18	30	408	13.6	30	3	2	4	53	13.3	15	0
2007	SSK	17	56	978	17.5	72	7	3	16	263	16.4	30	2
2008	SSK	7	36	488	13.5	31	3	1	2	39	19.5	21	0
2009	SSK	13	67	882	13.2	40	4	2	10	156	15.6	39	2
2010	SSK	18	87	1,380	15.9	66	6	3	6	77	12.8	31	0
2011	SSK	4	13	175	13.5	31	0	Team did not qualify
2012	HAM	17	72	971	13.5	27	8	Team did not qualify
2013	HAM	15	65	896	13.8	64	3	3	24	235	9.8	18	2
2014	HAM	13	62	639	10.3	31	3	2	6	81	13.5	21	0
2015	HAM	9	42	432	10.3	23	2	2	8	88	11.0	39	0
2016	HAM	17	101	1,059	10.5	39	5	Injured
2017	HAM	3	6	55	9.2	16	0	Team did not qualify
CFL totals		148	637	8,363	13.1	72	44	18	76	992	13.1	39	6
