= Spencer Watt =

Canadian football wide receiver (born 1988)

Profile
- Position: Wide receiver

Personal information
- Born: December 15, 1988 (age 37); North Vancouver, British Columbia, Canada
- Listed height: 6 ft 2 in (1.88 m)
- Listed weight: 180 lb (82 kg)

Career information
- University: Simon Fraser
- CFL draft: 2010: 3rd round, 18th overall pick

Career history
- 2010–2014: Toronto Argonauts
- 2015–2017: Hamilton Tiger-Cats

Awards and highlights
- Grey Cup champion (2012)
- Stats at CFL.ca

Spencer Watt (born December 15, 1988) is a Canadian former professional football wide receiver who played for the Toronto Argonauts and Hamilton Tiger-Cats of the Canadian Football League (CFL). He was drafted 18th overall by the Toronto Argonauts in the 2010 CFL draft. He played college football for Simon Fraser University.

== Personal life ==
After first joining football in grade 12, Spencer enrolled at Minot State where he also competed in track & field. After one year, Spencer transferred to Simon Fraser where he majored in Arts. His parents are Elizabeth and Mike, and he has an older sister named Melissa. Spencer played high school football at Windsor Secondary in North Vancouver.

== College career ==
Started career at Minot State (2006) before transferring to Simon Fraser (2007–09)…2009 - Played in seven games and caught 14 passes for 231 yards and 2 touchdowns…Named offensive player of the week in Canada West…2008 - Finished season with 301 yards and 16 receptions, both SFU career highs…Scored one touchdown on the season…Played in eight of the Clan’s ten games…Registered a season-high four receptions for 90 yards in playoff win over Saskatchewan Huskies. 2007 - First season with SFU, finished year with 194 yards receiving on 13 receptions…Registered a season-high six receptions for 112 yards against UBC…Played in seven of eight games on the year….2006 - Attended Minot State University as a freshman and competed in track & field.

== Professional career ==
=== Toronto Argonauts ===
He was drafted in the 3rd Round, 18th overall by the Toronto Argonauts in the 2010 CFL draft and signed with Toronto on May 19, 2010. During his time with Toronto he has gone to the playoffs and won the 2012 Grey Cup. Watt was signed to a two-year contract extension with Toronto on January 17, 2013.

=== Hamilton Tiger-Cats ===
Upon entering free agency, Watt signed with the Hamilton Tiger-Cats on February 10, 2015. Watt missed the entire 2015 CFL season, after he was sidelined with a torn achilles. On May 16, 2017, it was announced that Watt along with five other players were released by the Tiger-Cats.

== Career statistics ==
=== Receiving stats ===
		Receiving
Year	Team	GP	Rec	Yards	Avg	Long	TD
2010	TOR	11	14	201	14.4	50	2
2011	TOR	17	29	345	11.9	48	1
2012	TOR	17	34	424	12.5	49	0
2013	TOR	15	23	389	16.9	50	3
2014	TOR	16	35	356	10.2	33	3
2016	HAM	18	21	211	12.6	36	0
CFL totals		94	156	1,926	12.6	50	9
