= Drake Nevis =

American football player (born 1989)

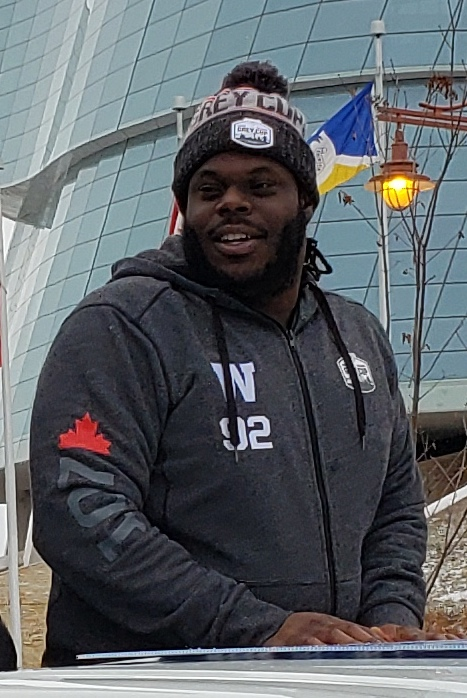
- Nevis at the 2019 Grey Cup parade in Winnipeg

No. 94, 75, 70
- Position: Defensive tackle

Personal information
- Born: May 8, 1989 (age 37); Thibodaux, Louisiana, U.S.
- Listed height: 6 ft 1 in (1.85 m)
- Listed weight: 300 lb (136 kg)

Career information
- High school: John Ehret (Marrero, Louisiana)
- College: LSU
- NFL draft: 2011: 3rd round, 87th overall pick

Career history
- Indianapolis Colts (2011–2012); San Diego Chargers (2013); Dallas Cowboys (2013); Jacksonville Jaguars (2013); Carolina Panthers (2014)*; Hamilton Tiger-Cats (2015–2016); Winnipeg Blue Bombers (2017–2019); Toronto Argonauts (2020–2021)
- * Offseason or practice squad member only

Awards and highlights
- Grey Cup champion (2019); BCS national champion (2007); First-team All-American (2010); First-team All-SEC (2010)

Career NFL statistics
- Total tackles: 50
- Sacks: 1.0
- Stats at Pro Football Reference
- Stats at CFL.ca

Drake Mitchell Nevis (born May 8, 1989) is an American former professional football player who was a defensive tackle in the National Football League (NFL) and Canadian Football League (CFL). He was selected in the third round of the 2011 NFL draft by the Indianapolis Colts. He played college football for the LSU Tigers. He won the 107th Grey Cup with the Winnipeg Blue Bombers in 2019.

== Early life ==
Nevis attended John Ehret High School in Marrero, Louisiana, where he recorded 72 tackles (17 for losses), 18 sacks, 25 quarterback hurries, eight forced fumbles and two recovered fumbles as a senior. He received Class 5A first-team all-state honors and a SuperPrep All-American selection. Regarded as a four-star recruit by Rivals.com, Nevis was listed as the No. 9 defensive tackle prospect in the class of 2007.

== Professional career ==
Pre-draft measurables
Height	Weight	Arm length	Hand span	Wingspan	40-yard dash	10-yard split	20-yard split	20-yard shuttle	Three-cone drill	Vertical jump	Broad jump	Bench press
6 ft 0 5/8 in (1.84 m)	294 lb (133 kg)	31 1/2 in (0.80 m)	9 3/8 in (0.24 m)	6 ft 5 3/8 in (1.97 m)	4.92 s	1.79 s	2.86 s	4.65 s	7.71 s	30.5 in (0.77 m)	9 ft 4 in (2.84 m)	31 reps
All values from NFL Combine/Pro Day

=== Indianapolis Colts ===
After a two-year stint with the Indianapolis Colts, Nevis was released on September 1, 2013.

=== San Diego Chargers ===
Shortly after his release from the Colts, the San Diego Chargers claimed him off waivers. Nevis was released on September 17, 2013.

=== Dallas Cowboys ===
He signed with the Dallas Cowboys on September 24, 2013. The Cowboys waived Nevis on December 13.

=== Jacksonville Jaguars ===
Nevis was signed by the Jacksonville Jaguars on December 23, 2013. He was released on May 12, 2014.

=== Carolina Panthers ===
Nevis was claimed off waivers on May 13, 2014, by the Carolina Panthers.

=== Hamilton Tiger-Cats ===
Nevis joined the Hamilton Tiger-Cats in 2015, but missed the season with injury. He returned in 2016 to produce 29 tackles and 5 sacks in 14 games played.

=== Winnipeg Blue Bombers ===
Nevis signed a two-year free agent deal with the Winnipeg Blue Bombers, and signed a one-year extension in March 2019. Over these three seasons, Nevis played in 50 games, and impactful as a run-stuffer, making 72 tackles, to go along with 6 sacks. Through the 2019 season Nevis played an important role in a dominant defensive line that built up a reputation, giving up short yardage to the run and putting pressure on the quarterback, led by Willie Jefferson, together with Jackson Jeffcoat, Jake Thomas, and Steven Richardson. Their strong play in the 2019 CFL playoffs saw several stuffs on third down to win the 2019 West Division Final and in the 107th Grey Cup, which they would go on to win, Winnipeg's first championship in 29 years. Nevis recorded one sack in the championship game, as the Bombers defence controlled the match.

=== Toronto Argonauts ===
Upon entering free agency, Nevis signed with the Toronto Argonauts on February 12, 2020. He re-signed with the Argonauts on February 2, 2021.

== Statistics ==
=== CFL ===
		Defense
Year	Team	Games	Tackles	ST	Sacks	Int	TD	FF
2016	HAM	17	29	0	5	0	0	0
2017	WPG	18	22	0	1	0	0	0
2018	WPG	18	26	0	2	0	0	0
2019	WPG	18	24	0	3	0	0	0
2021	TOR	1	2	0	0	0	0	0
CFL totals		72	103	0	11	0	0	0
