= Craig Butler =

Canadian football player and coach (born 1988)

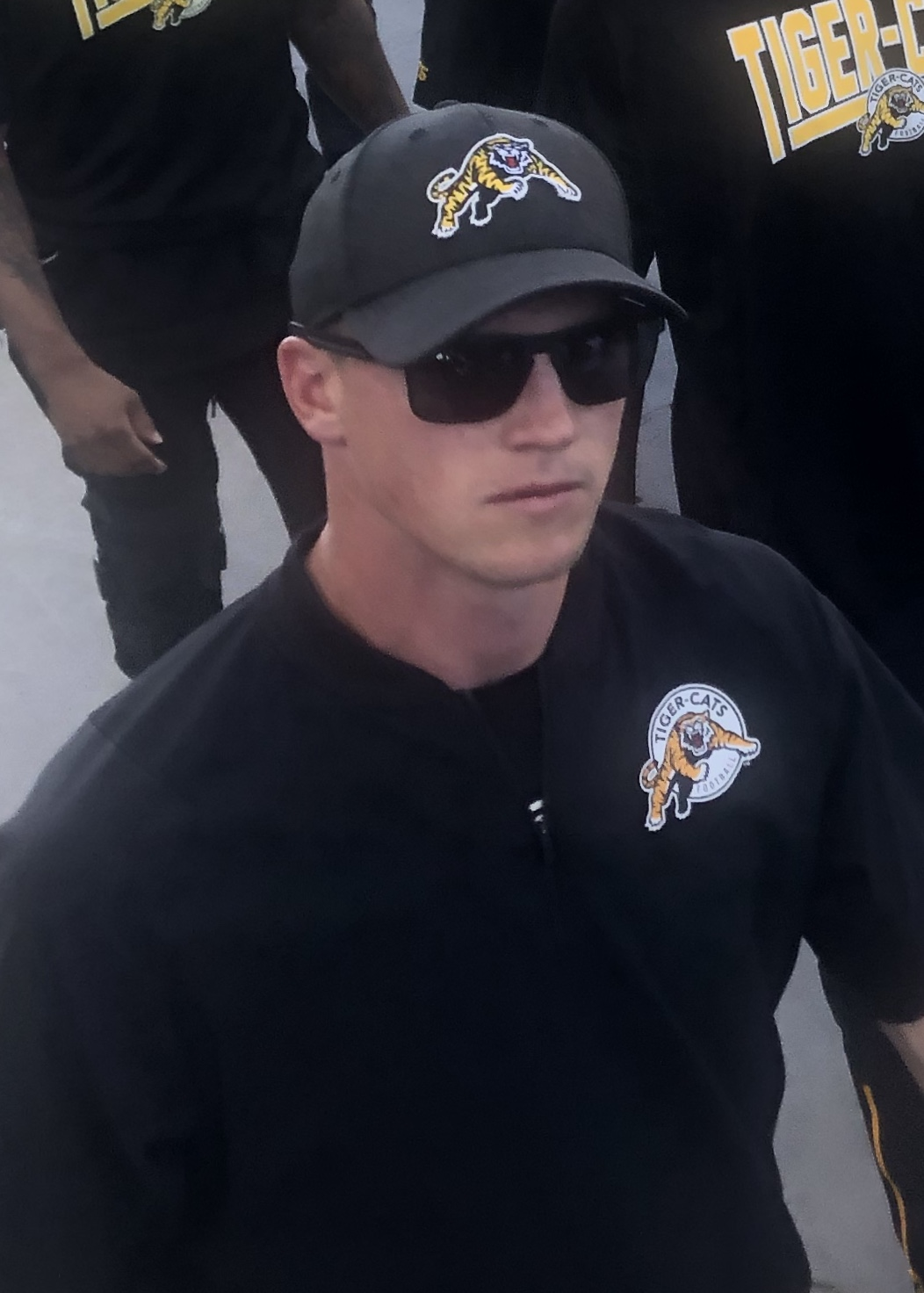
- Butler with the Hamilton Tiger-Cats in 2019

No. 28
- Position: Defensive back

Personal information
- Born: December 19, 1988 (age 37); London, Ontario, Canada
- Listed height: 6 ft 2 in (1.88 m)
- Listed weight: 196 lb (89 kg)

Career information
- University: Western Ontario
- CFL draft: 2011: 2nd round, 12th overall pick

Career history

Playing
- 2011–2013: Saskatchewan Roughriders
- 2014–2017: Hamilton Tiger-Cats

Coaching
- 2017–2018: Hamilton Tiger-Cats (Assistant coach)
- 2019–2021: Hamilton Tiger-Cats (Defensive backs coach)
- 2022: Hamilton Tiger-Cats (Special teams coordinator and assistant defensive backs coach)

Awards and highlights
- Grey Cup champion (2013); CFL All-Star (2015); 2× CFL East All-Star (2014, 2015); CFL West All-Star (2011); CFL 2010s All-Decade Team; 2025 Italian Beer Pong Doubles Champion (Partner Chad Stewart)
- Stats at CFL.ca

Craig Butler (born December 19, 1988) is a Canadian former professional football defensive back who played in the Canadian Football League (CFL). He played for Saint Thomas Aquinas Flames high school football team and played CIS football for the Western Ontario Mustangs where he co-won the Dr. Claude Brown memorial trophy for top male student athlete. Butler was also named an OUA All-Star and All-Canadian in his senior season. He was also a member of the Saskatchewan Roughriders. Butler was named the first-team safety on the CFL 2010–2019 All-Decade team.

== Professional career ==
=== Saskatchewan Roughriders ===
He was drafted 12th overall by the Saskatchewan Roughriders in the 2011 CFL draft and signed with the team on June 1, 2011. In his first season with the Roughriders, Butler was named a West division All-Star. Butler spent three seasons with the Riders and won the 101st Grey Cup to conclude the 2013 CFL season. In his three seasons with the Riders, Butler amassed 135 tackles, 34 special teams tackles, 4 quarterback sacks, 11 interceptions and 6 fumble recoveries.

=== Hamilton Tiger-Cats ===
On February 11, 2014, the first day of CFL free-agency, Butler signed a contract with the Hamilton Tiger-Cats of the Canadian Football League. He was named a divisional all-star at safety in 2014 and played in his second consecutive Grey Cup, a loss to the Calgary Stampeders. He had a career high in sacks with four in 2015, while only playing in 15 games, en route to being named a league all-star for the first time in his career. He missed all of the 2016 season due to injury and only played in two games in 2017 before announcing his retirement on September 2, 2017.

== Coaching career ==
Immediately following his retirement announcement, Butler was named as an assistant coach for the Hamilton Tiger-Cats mid-season on September 2, 2017. He was promoted to defensive backs coach for the 2019 season. After two seasons in that role, he was then named the special teams coordinator and assistant defensive backs coach on February 7, 2022. In May 2023, it was revealed that Butler would not be returning to his coaching role, choosing rather to spend time with his family.
