= Matt Coates =

Canadian football player (born 1991)

No. 81, 2
- Position: Wide receiver

Personal information
- Born: July 15, 1991 (age 35); Markham, Ontario, Canada
- Listed height: 6 ft 3 in (1.91 m)
- Listed weight: 197 lb (89 kg)

Career information
- High school: Markham District High School
- CJFL: Hamilton Hurricanes
- College: New Mexico Military Institute

Career history
- 2013–2016: Hamilton Tiger-Cats
- 2017: Winnipeg Blue Bombers

Awards and highlights
- CJFL All-Canadian (2013)
- Stats at CFL.ca

Matt Coates (born July 15, 1991) is Canadian former professional football player who was a wide receiver in the Canadian Football League (CFL) with the Hamilton Tiger-Cats and Winnipeg Blue Bombers. He played college football at the New Mexico Military Institute. He also played junior football for the Hamilton Hurricanes of the Canadian Junior Football League (CJFL).

== Early life ==
Coates played high school football at Markham District High School in Markham, Ontario and was named a two-time Team M.V.P. The Marauders won the Metro Bowl his senior year. He received interest from several universities but decided to become an electrician like his father. He played flag football in a recreational league while working on his apprenticeship in his father's business.

== Junior football ==
Coates played for the Hamilton Hurricanes of the CJFL after receiving an offer from the Hurricanes' coach Jay Hayes, who he played flag football with, to play for them. He returned to the Hurricanes after spending one season playing college football in 2012. He recorded 630 yards on 36 receptions for the Hurricanes and set a new OFC record with 13 touchdowns in 2013. He was also named a CJFL All-Canadian in 2013.

== College career ==
Coates played for the New Mexico Military Institute Broncos in 2012.

== Professional career ==
Coates was signed to the Hamilton Tiger-Cats's practice roster in September 2013. He later signed with the Tiger-Cats on January 29, 2014. He made his CFL debut on June 29, 2014, against the Saskatchewan Roughriders. Coates played in all eighteen regular season games and both playoff games, including the 102nd Grey Cup, for the Tiger-Cats in 2014.
