= Carl-Olivier Primé =

Canadian gridiron football player (born 1989)

No. 46
- Position: Fullback

Personal information
- Born: October 29, 1989 (age 37); Laval, Quebec, Canada
- Listed height: 6 ft 1 in (1.85 m)
- Listed weight: 255 lb (116 kg)

Career information
- High school: Kent School (Kent, Connecticut)
- College: Wagner
- CFL draft: 2013: 3rd round, 19th overall pick

Career history
- 2013: Indianapolis Colts*
- 2013–2017: Hamilton Tiger-Cats
- * Offseason or practice squad member only
- Stats at CFL.ca

Carl-Olivier "C. O." Primé (born October 29, 1989) is a Canadian former professional football fullback who played for the Hamilton Tiger-Cats of the Canadian Football League (CFL). He played college football at Wagner College and was selected by the Tiger-Cats in the third round of the 2013 CFL draft. Primé was also a member of the Indianapolis Colts of the National Football League (NFL).

== Early life ==
Carl-Olivier Primé was born on October 29, 1989, in Laval, Quebec, Canada. He attended the Kent School in Kent, Connecticut.

== College career ==
Primé played for the Wagner Seahawks from 2009 to 2012. He recorded career totals of 278 defensive tackles, 3.5 quarterback sacks, four forced fumbles and fumble recoveries, and an interception.

== Professional career ==
Primé signed with the Indianapolis Colts of the NFL on April 30, 2013, after going undrafted in the 2013 NFL draft. He was released by the Colts on August 25, 2013.

Primé was drafted by the Hamilton Tiger-Cats of the CFL with the 19th pick in the 2013 CFL draft. He signed with the team on September 9, 2013. He scored his first career touchdown on a 49-yard fumble return against the Winnipeg Blue Bombers on November 2, 2013. Primé played in all three of the Tiger-Cats playoff games in 2013, including the 101st Grey Cup loss to the Saskatchewan Roughriders.
