= Jeremy Lewis (gridiron football) =

American gridiron football player (born 1990)

No. 56, 60
- Position: Offensive lineman

Personal information
- Born: February 1, 1990 (age 36); West Palm Beach, Florida, U.S.
- Listed height: 6 ft 3 in (1.91 m)
- Listed weight: 312 lb (142 kg)

Career information
- High school: Palm Beach Lakes (FL)
- College: Miami (FL)

Career history
- 2013: Tampa Bay Buccaneers*
- 2014: Los Angeles Kiss*
- 2014: San Antonio Talons
- 2014: Toronto Argonauts
- 2014–2017: Hamilton Tiger-Cats
- 2017: Montreal Alouettes
- * Offseason or practice squad member only
- Stats at CFL.ca

Jeremy Lewis (born February 1, 1990) is an American former football offensive lineman. He attended the University of Miami, where he played college football for the Miami Hurricanes.

== Early career ==
Lewis played high school football for Palm Beach Lakes Community High School. He played for the Miami Hurricanes from 2009 to 2012. In his senior year, Lewis was part of a team that achieved 440.2 yards of total offense per game, fifth-best in the Atlantic Coast Conference.

== Professional career ==
=== NFL and AFL ===
Lewis was eligible for the 2013 NFL draft but went undrafted. On April 28, 2013, he signed with the Tampa Bay Buccaneers of the National Football League (NFL), but was later released on June 19. Lewis joined the Los Angeles Kiss of the Arena Football League (AFL) in January 2014, and was traded to the San Antonio Talons in February. He played in three games for the Talons in his only season with the AFL.

=== CFL ===
On May 13, the Toronto Argonauts of the CFL signed Lewis. He was moved to the practice squad before the beginning of the regular season, and was later released due to personal matters.

Lewis was signed by the Hamilton Tiger-Cats on July 13, and went on to play in 10 regular season games in his rookie season in the CFL. The 27-year-old Lewis made 39 starts over three seasons with the club, including 14 last year. He suffered a knee injury in an August game against the Calgary Stampeders and missed the last four games of the regular season as well as the East Semi-Final loss to Edmonton. The Florida native also missed nine games due to injury in 2015 He was released by the Ti-Cats on May 1, 2017, as they trimmed their roster down to 75 players.

Lewis was signed to the Montreal Alouettes' practice roster on July 23, 2017.
