= Ron Omara =

Canadian football player (born 1990)

Profile
- Position: Linebacker

Personal information
- Born: August 21, 1990 (age 36); Aylmer, Quebec, Canada
- Listed height: 6 ft 2 in (1.88 m)
- Listed weight: 240 lb (109 kg)

Career information
- High school: D'Arcy McGee
- University: St. Francis Xavier
- CFL draft: 2015: 4th round, 29th overall pick

Career history
- 2015–2016: Hamilton Tiger-Cats
- 2017: Ottawa Redblacks

Awards and highlights
- 2011 St.FX Rookie of the Year* 2013 AUS Defensive Player of the Year* 2013 Teams Most Valuable Player* 2013 St.FX Male Athlete of the Year* 2014 X-Men's Best Defensive player
- Stats at CFL.ca

Ron Omara (born August 21, 1990) is a Canadian former professional football linebacker. He played CIS football with the St. Francis Xavier. He was selected in the fourth round, twenty-ninth overall by the Hamilton Tiger-Cats in the 2015 CFL draft. He was also a member of the Ottawa Redblacks.

== College career ==
Omara played 26 games in four seasons (2011–14) at St. Francis Xavier University. Omara was named St. FX rookie of the year in 2011. He recorded a career-high 47 tackles and three sacks in 2013, earning the AUS defensive player of the year award, while receiving AUS all-star honours, second team All-Canadian honours, and being named the team's most valuable player. He finished his college career with 158 defensive tackles, six quarterback sacks, four interceptions, five forced fumbles. He finished 10th in all-time tackles in AUS history (158.0).

Omara played junior football with the Cumberland Panthers and Ottawa Sooners.

== Professional career ==
=== Hamilton Tiger-Cats ===
Omara was drafted in the fourth round (twenty-ninth overall) by the Hamilton Tiger-Cats of the Canadian Football League in the 2015 CFL draft. In two seasons with the Tiger-Cats Omara dressed for 25 games and contributed 8 special teams tackles and 1 defensive tackle. Following the 2016 season he was not re-signed by the Ti-Cats and became a free-agent.

=== Ottawa Redblacks ===
Omara signed with the Ottawa Redblacks (CFL) on February 15, 2017, the second day of free agency. After not seeing much playing time in 2017 Omara was released by the Redblacks on January 18, 2018.
