= Aaron Crawford (Canadian football) =

Canadian gridiron football player (born 1986)

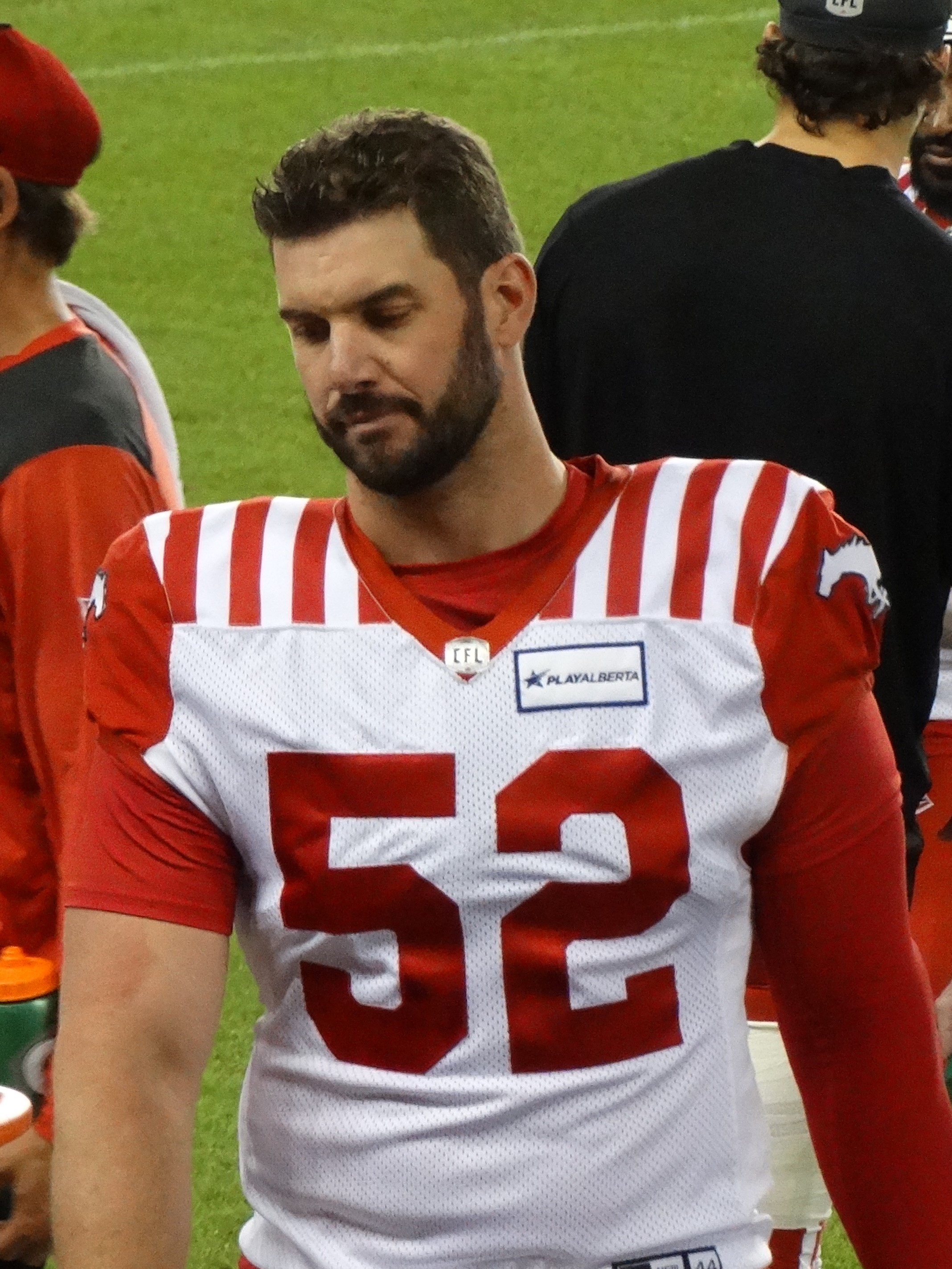
- Crawford with the Calgary Stampeders in 2024

Saskatchewan Roughriders
- Position: Long snapper
- CFL status: National

Personal information
- Born: September 23, 1986 (age 40); Medicine Hat, Alberta, Canada
- Listed height: 6 ft 4 in (1.93 m)
- Listed weight: 255 lb (116 kg)

Career information
- High school: Crescent Heights (Medicine Hat, Alberta)
- University: Saint Mary's
- CFL draft: 2012: 6th round, 40th overall pick

Career history
- 2012: Toronto Argonauts*
- 2012–2013: Saskatchewan Roughriders*
- 2013: Winnipeg Blue Bombers*
- 2013–2020: Hamilton Tiger-Cats
- 2021–2025: Calgary Stampeders
- 2026–present: Saskatchewan Roughriders
- * Offseason or practice squad member only

Career CFL statistics as of 2025
- Games played: 166
- Defensive tackles: 2
- Special teams tackles: 39
- Stats at CFL.ca

Aaron Crawford (born September 23, 1986) is a Canadian professional football long snapper for the Saskatchewan Roughriders of the Canadian Football League (CFL). He has also been a member of the Toronto Argonauts, Calgary Stampeders, Winnipeg Blue Bombers, and Hamilton Tiger-Cats. He played CIS football for the Saint Mary's Huskies and attended Crescent Heights High School in Medicine Hat, Alberta.

== Early life ==
Crawford played high school football for the Crescent Heights High School Vikings. He was named rookie of the year in 2003 and team captain in 2004.

== University career ==
Crawford played for the Saint Mary's Huskies in 2009 and 2011, appearing in 13 games. He recorded a career total of 55 solo tackles, 3.5 sacks, two fumbles forces and three fumble recoveries.

== Professional career ==
=== Toronto Argonauts ===
Crawford was drafted by the Toronto Argonauts with the 40th overall pick in the sixth round of the 2012 CFL draft. He was released by the Argonauts on June 20, 2012.

=== Saskatchewan Roughriders (first stint) ===
Crawford was signed to the Saskatchewan Roughriders' practice roster on October 3, 2012. He was released by the Roughriders on June 17, 2013.

=== Winnipeg Blue Bombers ===
Crawford was signed to the Winnipeg Blue Bombers' practice roster on July 22, 2013. He was released by the Blue Bombers on August 4, 2013.

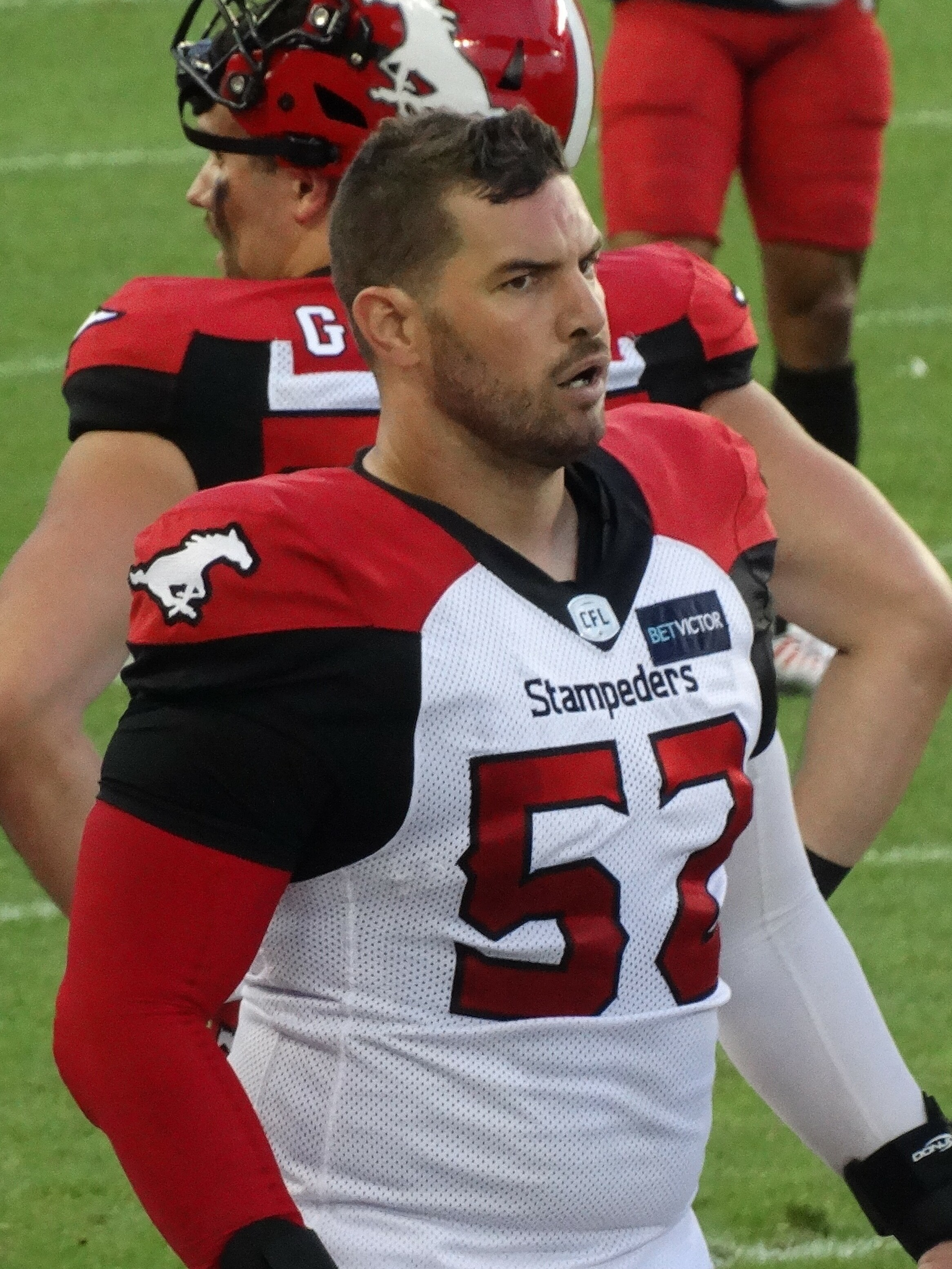
Crawford with the Stampeders in 2022

=== Hamilton Tiger-Cats ===
Crawford signed with the Hamilton Tiger-Cats on August 21, 2013. He played in his first professional game on August 24, 2013, against the Winnipeg Blue Bombers. He played in a total of four game before being released by the Tiger-Cats on October 12, 2013. He re-signed with the team on September 3, 2014, and played in the team's remaining 10 regular season games that year. He also played in both post-season games, including his first Grey Cup game, which was a loss to the Calgary Stampeders in the 102nd Grey Cup championship. Thereafter, he became the team's regular long snapper in 2015 and onward.

On October 27, 2017, he tore his anterior cruciate ligament and meniscus, but still finished the game. He had reconstructive surgery in Hamilton and rehabbed his knee there, instead of heading home to Medicine Hat, Alberta. He became a free agent in 2018 and when he was healthy, he re-signed with the Tiger-Cats on July 23, 2018. He played in 13 regular season games and two post-season games in 2018.

Crawford was again the team's long snapper for the 2019 season where the team finished with a franchise record 15–3 win–loss ratio as he played in all 18 regular season games. He also played in his second Grey Cup game, but the Tiger-Cats lost to the Blue Bombers in the 107th Grey Cup game. He did not play in 2020 due to the cancellation of the 2020 CFL season. He entered the 2021 CFL season as a pending free agent and was granted an early release by the Tiger-Cats on February 1, 2021.

=== Calgary Stampeders ===
On February 2, 2021, Crawford signed with the Calgary Stampeders. He played in five seasons and 68 games for the Stampeders, but was limited in his final season with the team in 2025 to three games due to a knee injury. He was later released on January 28, 2026.

=== Saskatchewan Roughriders (second stint) ===
On April 6, 2026, Crawford signed with the Saskatchewan Roughriders.
