= Mike Filer =

Canadian football player (born 1990)

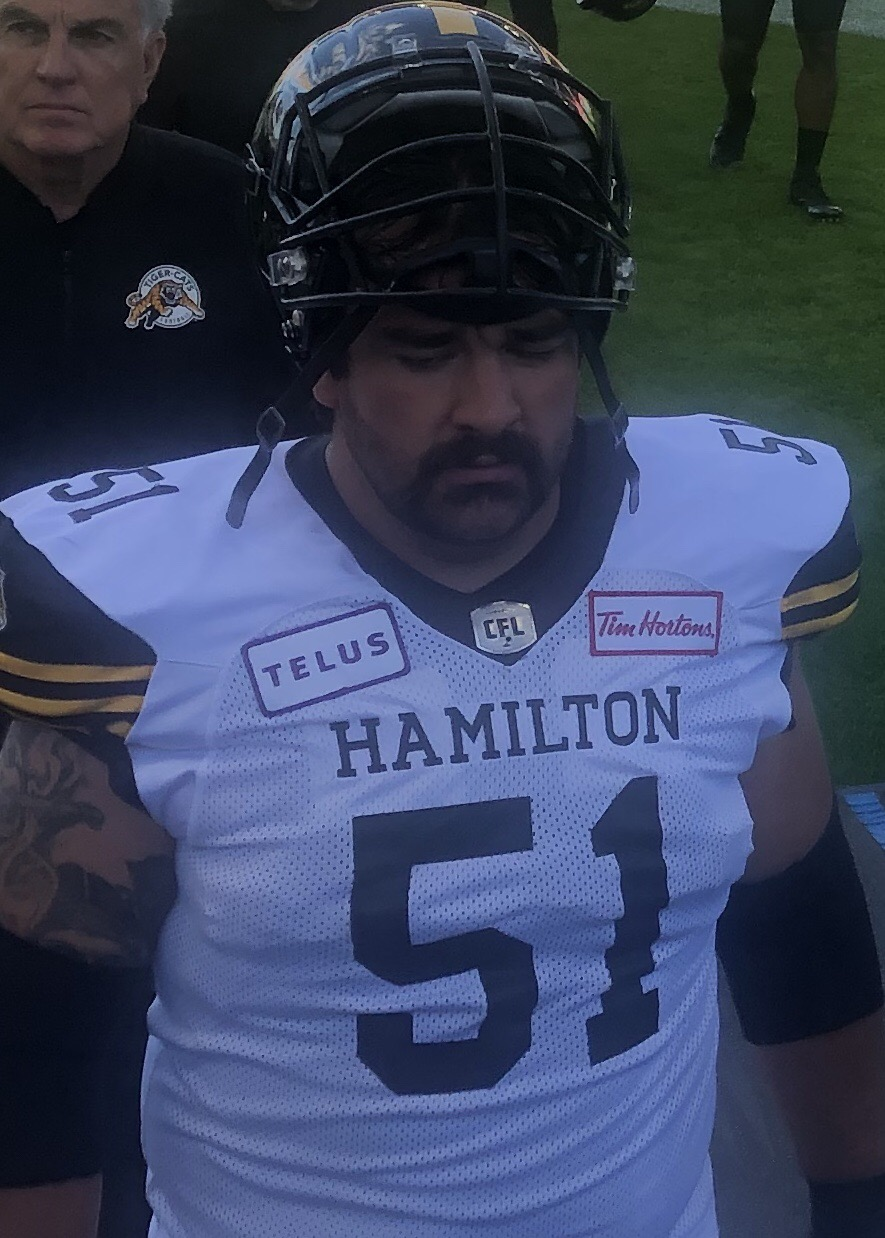
- Filer with the Hamilton Tiger-Cats in 2019

No. 51
- Position: Offensive lineman

Personal information
- Born: May 6, 1990 (age 36); Brantford, Ontario, Canada
- Listed height: 6 ft 3 in (1.91 m)
- Listed weight: 250 lb (113 kg)

Career information
- University: Mount Allison
- CFL draft: 2012: 5th round, 31st overall pick

Career history
- 2012: Calgary Stampeders*
- 2012–2020: Hamilton Tiger-Cats
- * Offseason or practice squad member only
- Stats at CFL.ca

Mike Filer (born May 6, 1990) is a Canadian former professional football offensive lineman. He played CIS football with the Mount Allison Mounties from 2008 to 2011.

== University career ==
Filer committed to Mount Allison University in the spring of 2008, and by the third week of the regular season, was starting at right guard as a true freshman for the Mounties.

He went on to become known as one of the greatest offensive linemen in school history, winning the team's Lineman of the Year award twice, being named a conference all-star twice, and in 2010 receiving second-team All-Canadian honours.

In 2013, Filer was named to the Sackville Tribune-Post's All-Time All-Star squad at offensive line.

== Professional career ==
=== Calgary Stampeders ===
Filer was drafted 31st overall by the Calgary Stampeders in the 2012 CFL draft. He attended training camp with the team and was released by the Stampeders on June 23, 2012.

=== Hamilton Tiger-Cats ===
Filer was signed as a free agent by the Hamilton Tiger-Cats on August 12, 2012. He dressed in his first professional game on October 12, 2012 in a match against the BC Lions. He dressed in four games as a backup in 2012 and for ten more in 2013. He became a regular starter in 2014 as he played and started in 14 games that year, including his first career start on July 31, 2014 in a game against the Winnipeg Blue Bombers. Filer also played and started in his first Grey Cup game that year as the Tiger-Cats lost the 102nd Grey Cup to the Calgary Stampeders.

Filer became the regular starter for the Tiger-Cats at centre through to the 2019 season. He started his second Grey Cup championship game, but the Tiger-Cats again lost in the 107th Grey Cup. He did not play in 2020 due to the cancellation of the 2020 CFL season and became a free agent on February 9, 2021. He re-signed with the Tiger-Cats on May 28, 2021. He was placed on the suspended list on July 14, 2021. He announced his retirement five days later.
