= James Stanley (American football) =

American gridiron football player and coach (born 1980)

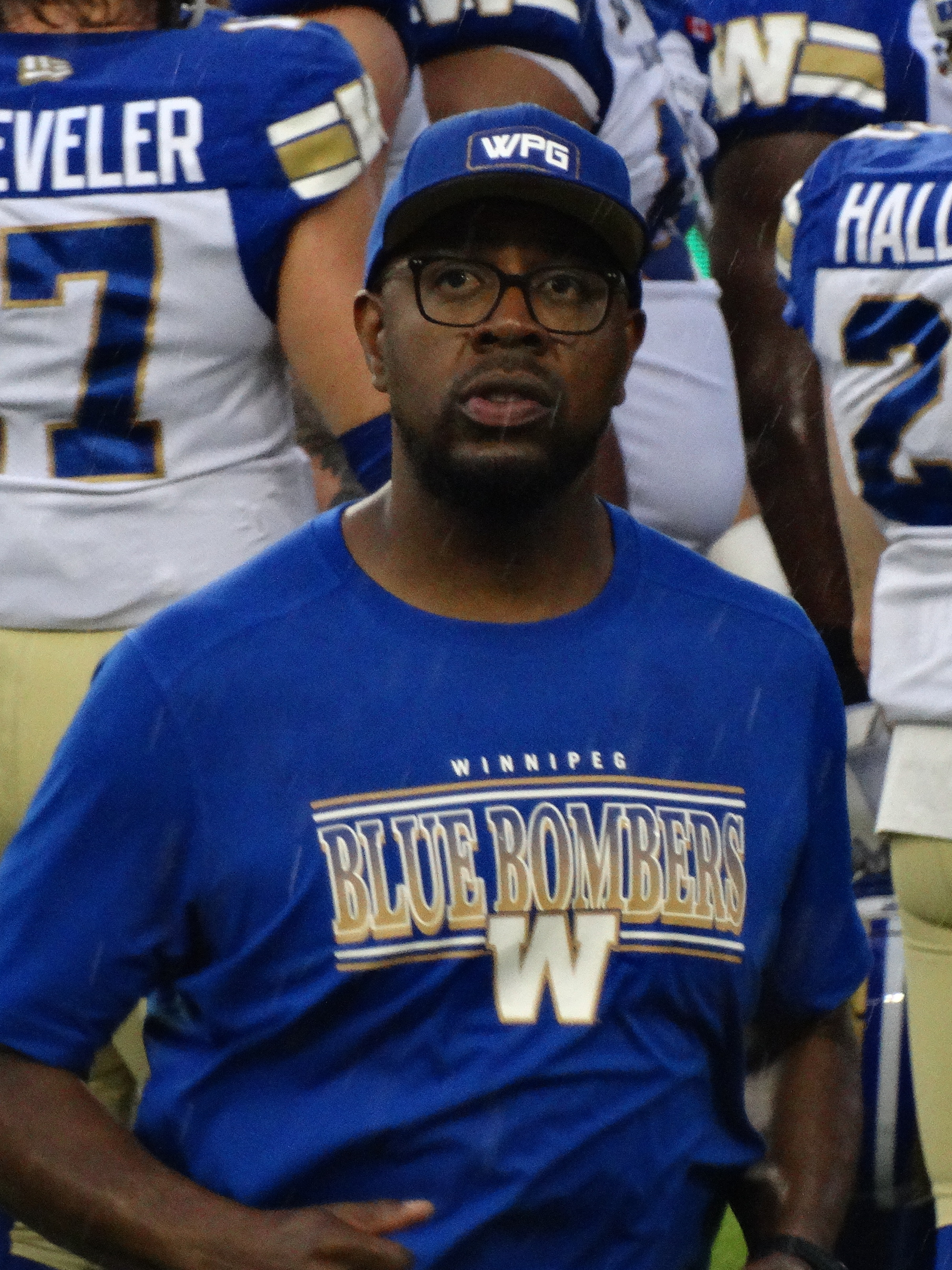
- Stanley with the Winnipeg Blue Bombers in 2025

Current position
- Title: Linebackers Coach & Director of Analytics
- Team: Winnipeg Blue Bombers
- Conference: Canadian Football League

Biographical details
- Born: November 12, 1978 (age 47); Jackson, Michigan, U.S.
- Education: University of Toledo

Playing career
- 1998–2002: Toledo

Coaching career (HC unless noted)
- 2004–2007: Fairborn HS (OH) (DB)
- 2007–2009: Dayton (DB)
- 2009: Detroit Lions (DB/ST intern)
- 2010: Hartford Colonials (Special Teams Quality Control)
- 2010: Cleveland Browns (Defensive Intern)
- 2011: Calgary Stampeders (Defensive Assistant)
- 2012: Toronto Argonauts (LB)
- 2013–2017: Hamilton Tiger-Cats (DB)
- 2018: Winnipeg Blue Bombers (Asst. Defensive Backs)
- 2019–present: Winnipeg Blue Bombers (Line Backers Coach & Pass Game Analyst)

Accomplishments and honors

Championships
- 3x Grey Cup Champion (2012, 2019), 2021), 2007 Mid Major National Champion (University of Dayton), 2001 M.A.C. Champion

James Stanley (born November 12, 1980) is an American gridiron football Linebackers Coach & Pass Game Analyst for the Winnipeg Blue Bombers of the Canadian Football League (CFL). Stanley has worked in the CFL for 13 seasons and has coached in 8 Grey Cups for 3 different teams and has won 3 championships. Stanley played professional football from 2004 to 2007 for various teams in the Arena Football League (AFL), AF2, National Indoor Football League (NIFL) and American Indoor Football League (AIFL) and was the first overall pick in the AIFL draft in 2005. He has coached for several teams at the college and professional levels. Stanley was the linebackers coach for the Toronto Argonauts when they won the 100th Grey Cup in 2012. And the Winnipeg Blue Bombers in 2019 and 2021.

== Early life and college ==
Stanley went to Jackson High School in Jackson, Michigan, where he played football, basketball and ran track before graduating in 1997.

Stanley played defensive back on the football team at the University of Toledo from 1998 to 2002 and was a four-year letter-winner. During his career, the Rockets earned back-to-back trips to the Motor City Bowl and won a Mid-American Conference (MAC) title in 2001.

After graduation from Toledo, Stanley also studied at Dayton Barber College in Dayton, Ohio and continued to take classes at the University of Dayton.

== Professional playing career ==
Stanley played four seasons of professional indoor football, from 2004 to 2007, with various teams in the Arena Football League (AFL), AF2, National Indoor Football League (NIFL) and American Indoor Football League (AIFL), and was selected with the first overall pick in the A.I.F.L. draft in 2005.

== Coaching career ==
Stanley coached in three consecutive Canadian Football League Grey Cup games from 2012 to 2014 and again in 2019 and 2021. Stanley became the team's defensive backs coach for the Hamilton Tiger-Cats in 2013 after helping the Toronto Argonauts capture the 100th Grey Cup as linebackers coach in 2012. Prior to coaching with the Toronto Argonauts, Stanley began his Canadian Football League (CFL) coaching career as a defensive assistant working with the Secondary. with the Calgary Stampeders in 2011, working primarily with the defensive backs.

In 2010, he was a special teams quality control and defensive assistant coach with the United Football League's Hartford Colonials, while later serving as a defensive coaching intern with the Cleveland Browns of the National Football League working with the secondary. (NFL). He also spent part of the 2009 season as a special teams and secondary intern with the NFL's Detroit Lions.

In addition to his pro experience, Stanley spent three years as the defensive backs coach for the University of Dayton, where he coached four All-Conference defensive backs. He also worked with the Cincinnati Marshals of the NIFL as their intern defensive backs coach in 2006.
