= Marcello Simmons =

American gridiron football player (born 1971)

No. 9
- Position: Defensive back

Personal information
- Born: August 8, 1971 (age 55); Tomball, Texas, U.S.
- Listed height: 6 ft 0 in (1.83 m)
- Listed weight: 190 lb (86 kg)

Career information
- College: Southern Methodist
- NFL draft: 1993: 4th round, 90th overall pick

Career history

Playing
- 1993–1994: Cincinnati Bengals
- 1995: Jacksonville Jaguars
- 1995–1998: Toronto Argonauts
- 1999: Edmonton Eskimos
- 2000: BC Lions
- 2000–2001: Toronto Argonauts

Coaching
- 2003–2008: Toronto Argonauts (ST coordinator)
- 2009: Seattle Seahawks (Special Teams Assistant)
- 2010: Acadia Axemen (DB coach)
- 2011: Guelph Gryphons (DB coach)
- 2012: Edmonton Eskimos (DB coach)
- 2013: Saint Mary's Huskies (Defensive Coordinator)
- 2014–2015: Hamilton Tiger-Cats (Defensive and Special Teams Assistant)
- 2016–present: BC Lions (Special Teams Coordinator)

Awards and highlights
- 3× Grey Cup champion – (1996, 1997, 2004)

Marcello Muhammad Simmons (born August 8, 1971) is an American former professional football defensive back and the former special teams coordinator for the BC Lions. He played for two seasons in the National Football League (NFL) with the Cincinnati Bengals before playing for seven seasons in the Canadian Football League (CFL) for the Toronto Argonauts, Edmonton Eskimos, and BC Lions. He is a three-time Grey Cup champion having won twice as a player in 1996 and 1997 and once as a coach in 2004. He played college football for the SMU Mustangs.

== College career ==
Simmons played college football with the SMU Mustangs from 1989 to 1993. Simmons earned SMU's Most Improved Athlete award in 1992. Simmons later graduated from SMU with a B.A. in Advertising.

== Professional career ==
During the 1993 NFL draft, Simmons was selected in the fourth round, 90th overall, by the Cincinnati Bengals. Simmons dressed in all 16 regular season games for the Bengals during the 1993 NFL season, but only started for two games, both against the Houston Oilers, of the season. The following season, Simmons made no game appearances for the Bengals. In January 1995, Simmons signed with the Jacksonville Jaguars but was a pre-season cut by the team on August 15.

After being cut by the Jaguars, Simmons signed with the Toronto Argonauts of the Canadian Football League. In September 1995, midway into the 1995 CFL season Simmons spent his first two weeks on the practice roster but started the last 5 games of the season. In 1996, with Simmons as a starting defensive player with the Argos, the team would go on to win its first of two consecutive Grey Cup championships. In 1999, just days before the start of training camp, Simmons was traded to the Edmonton Eskimos and would remain there for the rest of the season. In 2000, he signed with the BC Lions but was traded back to the Toronto Argonauts midway into the season. Simmons would eventually end his football career with the Argonauts, spending 6 of his 7 CFL seasons with them.

== Coaching career ==
In 2003, Simmons was named the special teams coach for the Toronto Argonauts. The team would go on to win a Grey Cup championship the following year. Simmons remained as the team's special teams coach until the end of the 2008 season.

On June 4, 2010, Simmons was announced as a new member of the coaching staff for the Acadia Axemen's football team. He served as the defensive backs coach for the University of Guelph Gryphons football team for the 2011.

On January 20, 2012, it was announced that Simmons had returned to coaching professional football by being named the defensive backs coach for the Edmonton Eskimos.

In 2013, he emerged as defensive coordinator of the Saint Mary's Huskies of AUS. In 2014, he was named defensive and special teams assistant with the Hamilton Tiger-Cats. In 2016, he became the BC Lions special teams coordinator.
