= Jake Olson =

American gridiron football player (born 1989)

Profile
- Position: Offensive lineman

Personal information
- Born: February 19, 1989 (age 37); Hartford, Wisconsin
- Listed height: 6 ft 4 in (1.93 m)
- Listed weight: 315 lb (143 kg)

Career information
- High school: Hartford Union
- College: Central Michigan University

Career history
- 2014: Montreal Alouettes*
- 2014–2016: Hamilton Tiger-Cats
- * Offseason or practice squad member only
- Stats at CFL.ca

Jake Olson (born February 19, 1989) is an American former professional football offensive lineman who played for the Hamilton Tiger-Cats of the Canadian Football League (CFL). He previously attended Central Michigan University, where he played college football for the CMU Chippewas.

== Early life ==
Olson played high school football at Hartford Union High School, where he was both an offensive and defensive lineman. He was all-state first-team player at both positions in his senior year, in addition to being named lineman of the year for the Wisconsin Little Ten Conference. Olson also helped lead his team to a conference championship with a 9–2 record that year. Following high school, he dislocated his left knee as a result of a congenital disorder that affects the tissues around his kneecaps.

== College career ==
Olson committed to Central Michigan in 2007 but did not enroll until the following spring, both due to his knee injury and to extend his eligibility another year. He also redshirted in 2008. In his first season, Olson started 12 games as a left tackle and helped lead his team to a 12–2 record. He was designated an honorable mention freshman All-American. Olson missed two games that year due to a damaged ligament in his ankle, which he had surgery to correct during the offseason. The following season in 2010, he started three games before he had a season-ending right knee injury that required surgery. He returned in 2011 to start nine games, but missed multiple games at the end of the season due to a neck injury. He dislocated his right kneecap for the second time in 2012, ending his season after only two games. His eligibility was extended a year by the NCAA due to the injury. He again suffered a season-ending injury in 2013 when he broke his wrist after two games, leading to another surgery and the temporary insertion of three pins into his arm.

== Professional career ==
Olson was eligible for the 2014 NFL draft, but went undrafted. He later tried out for the Detroit Lions and the Miami Dolphins but was not signed by an NFL team. On June 2, 2014, Olson was signed by the Montreal Alouettes of the CFL, but he was later released before the start of the regular season. The Hamilton Tiger-Cats signed Olson to their practice roster on July 14, and he went on to start nine games in his rookie season. Olson also played in two playoff games, including the 102nd Grey Cup. Olson recorded his first two tackles on July 16, 2015, in a game against the Montreal Alouettes, where he stopped the return of both an interception and a fumble.
