= Anthony Woodson =

Canadian football player (born 1988)

Profile
- Position: Running back

Personal information
- Born: January 7, 1988 (age 38); Calgary, Alberta, Canada
- Listed height: 6 ft 0 in (1.83 m)
- Listed weight: 215 lb (98 kg)

Career information
- University: Calgary
- CFL draft: 2010: 4th round, 29th overall pick

Career history
- 2012–2013: Winnipeg Blue Bombers
- 2013–2014: Toronto Argonauts
- 2015–2016: Hamilton Tiger-Cats
- 2017: Calgary Stampeders
- Stats at CFL.ca

Anthony Woodson
Medal record

Men's American football

Representing Canada

World Championship
Silver medal – second place	2011 Austria	Team competition

Anthony Woodson (born January 7, 1988) is a Canadian former professional football running back. He was drafted 29th overall by the Winnipeg Blue Bombers in the 2010 CFL draft and played for parts of two seasons with the club. On September 9, 2013, Woodson was traded to the Toronto Argonauts, along with a fifth round draft pick in 2014, in exchange for offensive lineman Marc Parenteau and a third round draft pick in 2014. He signed with the Hamilton Tiger-Cats as a free agent on February 11, 2015 and spent two years with the team before signing with his hometown Stampeders on February 17, 2017.

Woodson played CIS football for the Calgary Dinos from 2006 to 2008 and 2010 to 2011, sitting out the 2009 season due to injury.
