= Jeff Mathews =

American football player (born 1991)

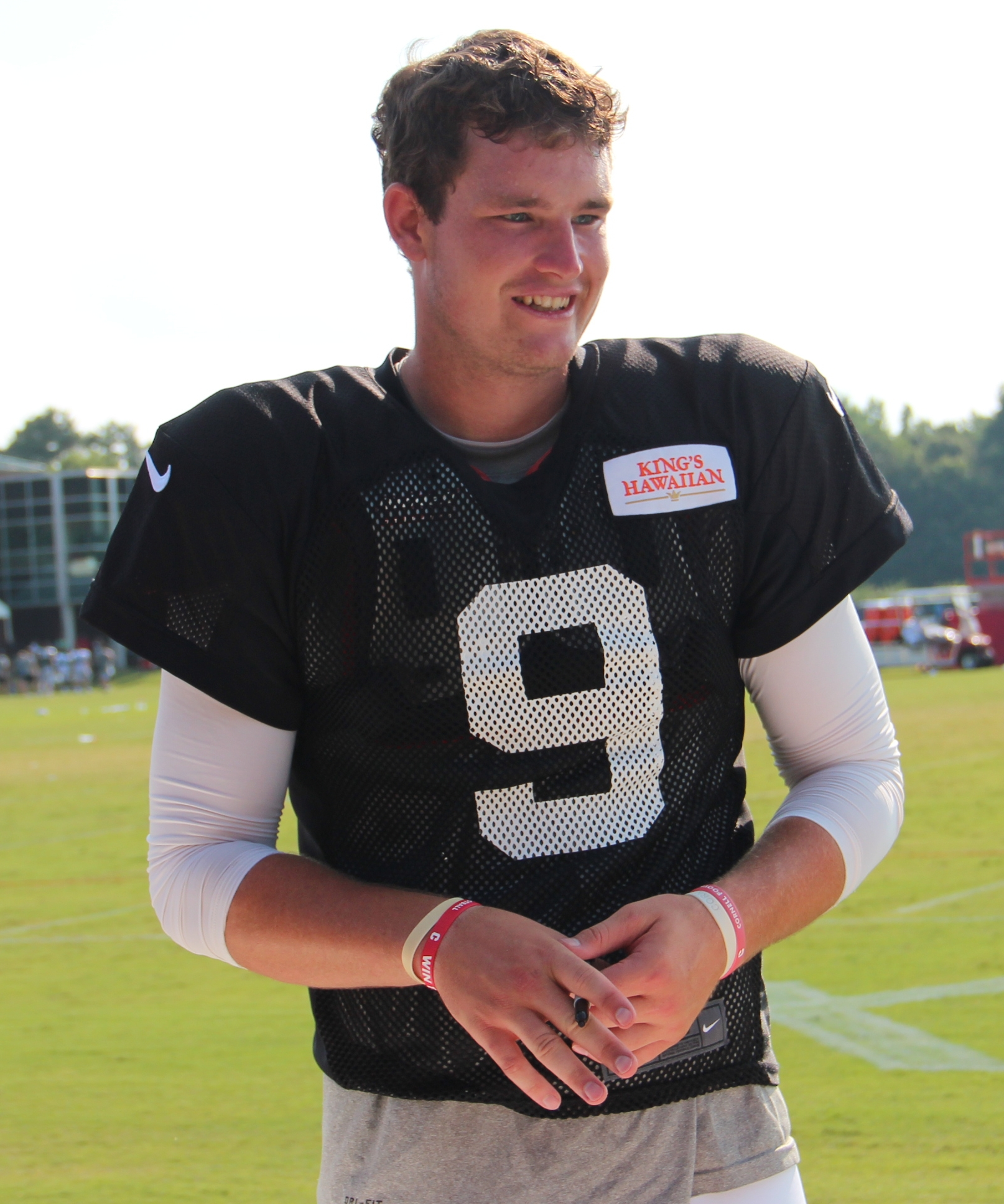
- Mathews with the Atlanta Falcons

No. 4, 7, 9
- Position: Quarterback

Personal information
- Born: August 25, 1991 (age 35); Camarillo, California, U.S.
- Listed height: 6 ft 4 in (1.93 m)
- Listed weight: 225 lb (102 kg)

Career information
- High school: Adolfo (Camarillo)
- College: Cornell
- NFL draft: 2014: undrafted

Career history
- Atlanta Falcons (2014)*; Indianapolis Colts (2014)*; Arizona Cardinals (2014)*; Hamilton Tiger-Cats (2015–2016); Toronto Argonauts (2017); Montreal Alouettes (2018)
- * Offseason or practice squad member only
- Stats at CFL.ca

Jeffrey Kyle Mathews (born August 25, 1991) is an American former professional football player who was a quarterback for four seasons in the Canadian Football League (CFL). He played college football for the Cornell Big Red, ranking among the top 20 quarterbacks in passing yardage in Division I FCS history. He surpassed the Cornell record for total passing yards by more than 2,000 yards and ended his collegiate career as the holder of 47 Cornell and 18 Ivy League conference records. After going undrafted in the 2014 NFL draft, Mathews spent the summer with the Atlanta Falcons, and was a practice squad member of the Indianapolis Colts and the Arizona Cardinals. He moved north to the CFL, playing two seasons with the Hamilton Tiger-Cats and a season each with the Toronto Argonauts and the Montreal Alouettes.

== Early life ==
Jeff Mathews was born August 25, 1991, in Camarillo, California, the son of Shellie and Jeff Mathews. His parents divorced when he was young and Mathews was raised by his father in Colorado, and California, with his mother and older sister living in Florida. Mathews' sister Katie was paralyzed in an automobile accident in May 2006 when the car in which she was a passenger flipped when the driver swerved abruptly to avoid missing a freeway exit. By 2013, she was living in Texas and working as a motivational speaker, focusing on the issue of the dangers of distracted driving.

He attended Adolfo Camarillo High School (ACHS), a public school in Camarillo. During his high school football career, Mathews led the ACHS Scorpions' junior varsity football team to a 9–1 record in the 2007 season. Promoted to starting quarterback of the varsity team for the 2008 and 2009 campaigns, Mathews passed for 49 touchdowns and nearly 5,000 yards, against 18 interceptions, averaging over 227 yards per game in the air. Mathews was named Ventura County Player of the Year as a Senior in honor of his accomplishments.

A two-sport athlete, the 6'4" Mathews also started at forward on the ACHS varsity basketball team, wearing jersey #23 for head coach Mike Prewitt. Although he dreamed of starting at quarterback for the University of Notre Dame, Mathews was not offered a scholarship by any Football Bowl Subdivision (Division I-A) university.

== Collegiate career ==
Mathews did not receive a scholarship to play football for Cornell University in Ithaca, New York, part of the Football Championship Subdivision (Division I-AA), as no Ivy League school gives athletic scholarships. At Cornell, injuries thrust him into the role of starting quarterback at halftime of the first game of his Freshman season. The quarterback job proved to be his for the rest of his collegiate career. Mathews broke the school's single game passing yards record for a Freshman in his first start in the Ivy League opener against Yale University and ended the season with 1,723 yards in the air and 7 touchdown passes, with an additional two touchdowns rushing the football. For his efforts, Mathews was unanimously named the 2010 Ivy League Rookie of the Year.

During his 2011 Sophomore campaign, Mathews managed to smash the Cornell single game passing record, racking up 548 yards against Penn. He also set school seasonal records for passing yardage (3,412 yards), touchdown passes (25), and completion percentage (.679). Mathews was ranked third nationally in passing yards per game and passing efficiency and was twice named Ivy League and national player of the week. For his achievements, Mathews was awarded the 2011 Bushnell Cup winner as Ivy League Offensive Player of the Year.

Mathews was hampered by injuries during the 2012 Ivy League season, his Junior year. Nevertheless, he managed to lead the league in passing attempts, completions, and yards, managing to accumulate nearly 3,200 yards in the air despite missing a game. Mathews' 355.1 yards passing per game ranked second nationally and he became Cornell's all-time leading passer with 8,331 yards in the air — smashing the previous record of 7,710 yards held by Ricky Rahne. Mathews was named to the All-Ivy second-team for his heroics and was runner-up for the 2012 Bushnell Cup as the Ivy League's top offensive player.

The 2013 season, Mathews' Senior year, was marked by additional Ivy League honors, including the season's top numbers for attempts, completions, and passing yards (2,953). Mathews's 328.1 yards per game topped the Ivy League and he finished second in passing touchdowns, with 22. He finished 19th in the 2013 Walter Payton Award Voting. Following the season Mathews was named to the College Sports Journal FCS All-America team and received the additional honor of becoming only the fifth player in Cornell school history invited to participate in the East–West Shrine Game, serving as captain of the East squad. Mathews was also invited to participate in the NFL Scouting Combine in preparation for the 2014 NFL draft.

== Professional career ==
Pre-draft measurables
Height	Weight	40-yard dash	10-yard split	20-yard split	20-yard shuttle	Three-cone drill	Vertical jump	Broad jump	Wonderlic
6 ft 4 in (1.93 m)	223 lb (101 kg)	5.26 s	1.87 s	3.09 s	4.36 s	7.14 s	25 1/2 in (0.65 m)	8 ft 9 in (2.67 m)	40
All values from NFL Combine

=== NFL ===
As a prominent player of a marquee position from the Eastern media market who was on the bubble of being drafted into the National Football League, Mathews' draft saga was chronicled in a three part series in the New York Post by sports journalist Brian Costello. Although the career passing leader at Cornell University, Mathews was not regarded as a top professional prospect coming from the NFL scouting combine, with speculation pegging Mathews anywhere from a 5th round draft selection to undrafted. While Mathews' strong throwing arm was admired, scouts expressed misgivings about the former Big Red QB's footwork and general lack of athleticism — problematic in the lightning fast professional game.

Not selected in the 2014 NFL draft, Mathews was immediately signed as a free agent by the Atlanta Falcons and attended that team's 2014 training camp. This camp was documented by HBO Sports and NFL Films as part of their annual documentary series Hard Knocks, with the team's August 24, 2014, decision to release Mathews featuring prominently in the storyline of the series' penultimate 4th episode.

On September 1, 2014, Mathews signed with the Indianapolis Colts, joining their ten-member practice squad, but was subsequently released on September 9, 2014. He signed with the Arizona Cardinals on December 15, 2014.

=== Hamilton Tiger-Cats ===
On January 20, 2015, Mathews signed a contract with the Hamilton Tiger-Cats of the Canadian Football League (CFL). Kent Austin, the head coach of the Tiger-Cats, was Mathews' head coach at Cornell University for three seasons from 2010 through 2012. He scored his first touchdown on July 2, 2015, against the Winnipeg Blue Bombers. On July 26, 2015, he jumped over the Saskatchewan Roughriders late in the 4th quarter to score the winning touchdown in an eventual 31–21 victory. He capped off a Labour Day Classic drubbing of the Argos by scoring from the one yard line on September 7, 2015. After an injury to starting quarterback Zach Collaros, Mathews became the Tiger-Cats' starter in October 2015. On October 9, 2015, he threw his first CFL touchdown to former Cornell teammate Luke Tasker.

=== Toronto Argonauts ===
On February 14, 2017, Mathews signed with the Toronto Argonauts of the CFL as a free agent. He made his first start with the Argonauts in Week 8 when starting quarterback Ricky Ray went down with a shoulder injury. Mathews completed 8 of 12 passes for only 67 yards before being replaced at half-time by Cody Fajardo. He won a Grey Cup in his only season with the team. Mathews was released by the Argos on May 16, 2018.

=== Montreal Alouettes ===
Mathews signed with the Alouettes on June 12, 2018. Nearing the end of the 2018 season Mathews signed a one-year contract extension with the Alouettes on October 28, 2018. He was released following final roster cuts prior to the 2019 season.
