= 2016 Ottawa Redblacks season =

Canadian Football League season

- General manager: Marcel Desjardins
- Head coach: Rick Campbell
- Home stadium: TD Place Stadium

Results
- Record: 8–9–1
- Division place: 1st, East
- Playoffs: Won Grey Cup
- Team MOP: Ernest Jackson
- Team MODP: Damaso Munoz
- Team MOC: Brad Sinopoli
- Team MOOL: Jon Gott
- Team MOST: Tristan Jackson
- Team MOR: Jason Lauzon-Séguin

Uniform

The 2016 Ottawa Redblacks season was the third season for the team in the Canadian Football League (CFL). The Redblacks finished in first place in the East Division with an 8–9–1 record. This was the first time in CFL history that a team with a losing record finished first in their division. The 2016 season was the third with Rick Campbell as head coach and Marcel Desjardins as general manager.

The club failed to match their 12–6 record from the previous season; nevertheless, with their week 19 win in Winnipeg against the Blue Bombers the Redblacks repeated as regular season East Division champions, earning a bye to and the right to host the 2016 East Final in the process.

The Redblacks' season featured the first-ever Grey Cup rematch to take place in an earlier round of the playoffs as the 2015 champion Edmonton Eskimos qualified as a crossover team for the East Division playoffs and advanced to the Eastern Final. The Redblacks avenged their 2015 Grey Cup loss with a 35–23 victory over Edmonton to earn the right to play in the 104th Grey Cup. At BMO Field in Toronto, the Redblacks won the first championship for an Ottawa CFL team since the Rough Riders did it in 1976.

== Off-season ==
=== Open tryout sessions ===
On February 2, 2016, the Redblacks announced they would be holding open tryouts across North America during the spring. The dates and locations are listed in the table below:

Location	Venue	Date
Miami, Florida	Florida International University	February 27, 2016
Atlanta, Georgia	Lakewood Stadium	February 28, 2016
Austin, Texas	Bastrop Memorial Stadium	April 9, 2016
Las Vegas, Nevada	Bill 'Wildcat' Morris Rebel Park	April 10, 2016
Ottawa, Ontario	TD Place Stadium	April 23, 2016
Indianapolis, Indiana	Decatur Central High School	May 21, 2016

=== Free-agency ===
Prior to the start of free-agency at 12:00pm ET on February 9, 2016, the RedBlacks extended the contracts of some significant players. They brought back defensive lineman Zack Evans, wide-receiver Chris Williams and linebacker Damaso Munoz.

==== Additions ====
- Ottawa made a big splash on the first day of free-agency when they signed highly coveted former-Argos QB Trevor Harris. Harris played very well in 17 games for the Argos in 2015; completing 71% of his passes attempts with 33 touchdowns and 19 interceptions for 4,354 yards. Harris was expected to be the back-up quarterback behind the then 41-year old, 2015 Most Outstanding Player, Henry Burris.
- Veteran national defensive back Ryan Hinds agreed to terms with Ottawa in the middle of February. Hinds spent his first seven CFL seasons between the Tiger-Cats and the Eskimos. However, Hinds decided to retire citing that "his heart wasn't in it and he wasn't going to play anymore".
- Former Oakland Raiders and New York Giants wide receiver Juron Criner signed with the Redblacks on April 14 in time for training camp. Following a successful pre-season Criner made the final roster.

==== Losses ====
- Star defensive end Justin Capicciotti signed with the Saskatchewan Roughriders on February 10. Capicciotti had been one of Ottawa's best pass-rushers in the previous two seasons, totaling 23 sacks and just shy of 100 tackles.
- Also on February 10, starting running back Jeremiah Johnson signed with the BC Lions. In two seasons with the Redblacks Johnson saw action in 15 games (missing 8 games due to injury in 2015), carrying the ball 135 times for 686 yards (5.0 average) with 11 rushing touchdowns.
- Veteran defensive back Jovon Johnson signed with the Montreal Alouettes. Javon Johnson was an Eastern All-Star in 2015 and was one of the leaders on the defensive side of the ball.
- Offensive tackle Colin Kelly signed a contract with the San Francisco 49ers of the NFL. Kelly played 18 games in 2015 for Ottawa at right tackle.
- Veteran defensive lineman Keith Shologan signed with the Winnipeg Blue Bombers. Shologon contributed 7 sacks during the 2015 campaign.
- Defensive lineman Shawn Lemon was released by the Redblacks following the conclusion of the 2015 season so he could pursue NFL opportunities. He ultimately signed with the Saskatchewan Roughriders in January.

=== CFL draft ===
The 2016 CFL draft took place on May 10, 2016. The Redblacks had nine selections in the eight-round draft after acquiring Saskatchewan's sixth and seventh-round picks in exchange for Maurice Price and their own sixth-round pick.

Round	Pick	Player	Position	School
1	7	Jason Lauzon-Seguin	OL	Laval
2	16	Mikael Charland	DB	Concordia
3	25	Mehdi Abdesmad	DL	Boston College
4	35	Kevin Jackson	LB	Sam Houston State
5	43	Randy Beardy	OL	Windsor
6	45	Kyle Fraser-Audit	OL	Guelph
7	54	Arto Khatchikian	LB	Concordia
7	60	Jamal Kett	WR	Western Ontario
8	69	Guillaume Tremblay-Lebel	LB	Laval

=== Training camp ===
Non-mandatory spring mini-camp was held on April 24–26 at TD Place stadium. The sessions were open for the public to view. Mandatory training camp took place between May 29 and through June 19. First-year CFL players had three practices prior to the official training camp (May 25 through 27). The majority of practices took place at TD Place Stadium, with two at Carleton University and one at Stade Mont-Bleu in Gatineau, Quebec. The team conducted a "mock-game" as part of their training camp on June 5. This was the first training camp season in which the Redblacks had priority at TD Place, as the stadium was under construction in 2014 and hosting the 2015 FIFA Women's World Cup last year.

== Preseason ==
Week	Date	Kickoff	Opponent	Results		TV	Venue	Attendance	Summary
Week	Date	Kickoff	Opponent	Score	Record	TV	Venue	Attendance	Summary
A	Mon, June 13	7:00 p.m. EDT	vs. Winnipeg Blue Bombers	W 18–14	1–0	TSN	TD Place Stadium	17,947	Recap
B	Fri, June 17	7:30 p.m. EDT	at Hamilton Tiger-Cats	L 25–42	1–1	Ticats.ca	Tim Hortons Field		Recap

# Games played with white uniforms.

== Regular season ==
=== Standings ===
East Division
Team	GP	W	L	T	Pts	PF	PA	Div	Stk	
Ottawa Redblacks	18	8	9	1	17	486	498	5–3	L1	Details
Hamilton Tiger-Cats	18	7	11	0	14	507	502	5–3	L2	Details
Montreal Alouettes	18	7	11	0	14	383	416	3–5	W3	Details
Toronto Argonauts	18	5	13	0	10	383	568	3–5	L7	Details

=== Schedule ===
Week	Date	Kickoff	Opponent	Results		TV	Venue	Attendance	Summary
Week	Date	Kickoff	Opponent	Score	Record	TV	Venue	Attendance	Summary
1	Sat, June 25	7:00 p.m. EDT	at Edmonton Eskimos	W 45–37 (OT)	1–0	TSN/RDS	Commonwealth Stadium	27,846	Recap
2	Thurs, June 30	7:00 p.m. EDT	at Montreal Alouettes	W 28–13	2–0	TSN/RDS/ESPN2	Molson Stadium	21,522	Recap
3	Fri, July 8	7:00 p.m. EDT	vs. Calgary Stampeders	T 26–26 (2OT)	2–0–1	TSN/RDS	TD Place Stadium	24,621	Recap
4	Wed, July 13	7:30 p.m. EDT	at Toronto Argonauts	W 30–20	3–0–1	TSN/RDS	BMO Field	12,373	Recap
5	Fri, July 22	9:00 p.m. EDT	at Saskatchewan Roughriders	L 29–30	3–1–1	TSN/RDS2	Mosaic Stadium	30,172	Recap
6	Sun, July 31	7:30 p.m. EDT	vs. Toronto Argonauts	L 20–23	3–2–1	TSN/RDS/ESPN2	TD Place Stadium	24,894	Recap
7	Sat, Aug 6	7:00 p.m. EDT	vs. Edmonton Eskimos	W 23–20	4–2–1	TSN	TD Place Stadium	24,560	Recap
8	Bye								
9	Fri, Aug 19	7:00 p.m. EDT	vs. Montreal Alouettes	L 19–43	4–3–1	TSN/RDS	TD Place Stadium	24,907	Recap
10	Thurs, Aug 25	7:30 p.m. EDT	vs. BC Lions	L 23–29	4–4–1	TSN/RDS/ESPN2	TD Place Stadium	24,677	Recap
11	Thurs, Sept 1	7:30 p.m. EDT	at Montreal Alouettes	W 19–14	5–4–1	TSN/RDS	Molson Stadium	19,117	Recap
12	Bye								
13	Sat, Sept 17	5:00 p.m. EDT	at Calgary Stampeders	L 23–48	5–5–1	TSN	McMahon Stadium	26,529	Recap
14	Fri, Sept 23	7:00 p.m. EDT	vs. Toronto Argonauts	W 29–12	6–5–1	TSN/RDS2	TD Place Stadium	25,088	Recap
15	Sat, Oct 1	10:00 p.m. EDT	at BC Lions	L 33–40	6–6–1	TSN/RDS	BC Place	19,703	Recap
16	Fri, Oct 7	7:00 p.m. EDT	vs. Saskatchewan Roughriders	L 30–32 (OT)	6–7–1	TSN	TD Place Stadium	24,668	Recap
17	Fri, Oct 14	7:00 p.m. EDT	at Hamilton Tiger-Cats	W 30–29	7–7–1	TSN	Tim Hortons Field	23,868	Recap
18	Fri, Oct 21	7:00 p.m. EDT	vs. Hamilton Tiger-Cats	L 36–39 (2OT)	7–8–1	TSN	TD Place Stadium	24,210	Recap
19	Sat, Oct 29	4:00 p.m. EDT	at Winnipeg Blue Bombers	W 23–10	8–8–1	TSN/RDS	Investors Group Field	26,097	Recap
20	Fri, Nov 4	7:00 p.m. EDT	vs. Winnipeg Blue Bombers	L 20–33	8–9–1	TSN/RDS2	TD Place Stadium	24,432	Recap

# Games played with colour uniforms.
# Games played with white uniforms.

== Post-season ==
=== Schedule ===
Game	Date	Kickoff	Opponent	Results		TV	Venue	Attendance	Summary
Game	Date	Kickoff	Opponent	Score	Record	TV	Venue	Attendance	Summary
East Semi-Final	Bye								
East Final	Sun, Nov 20	1:00 p.m. EST	vs. Edmonton Eskimos	W 35–23	1–0	TSN/RDS/ESPN2	TD Place Stadium	24,248	Recap
104th Grey Cup	Sun, Nov 27	6:00 p.m. EST	vs. Calgary Stampeders	W 39–33 (OT)	2–0	TSN/RDS/ESPN2	BMO Field	33,421	Recap

# Games played with colour uniforms.

Over 40,000 fans attended the Grey Cup parade at Lansdowne Park two days following the game.

== Roster ==
2016 Ottawa Redblacks final roster
Quarterbacks: 1 Henry Burris; 7 Trevor Harris; 5 Danny O'Brien; Running backs: 25 Brendan Gillanders; 27 Kienan LaFrance; 3 Travon Van; Receivers: 86 Juron Criner; 82 Greg Ellingson; 8 Jake Harty; 9 Earmest Jackson; 81 Patrick Lavoie; 83 Scott MacDonell; 13 Khalil Paden; 88 Brad Sinopoli; 4 Jamill Smith	Offensive linemen: 53 Matthew Albright G; 64 J'Michael Deane G; 68 Tommie Draheim T; 63 Jon Gott C; 58 Jason Lauzon-Séguin T; 66 Nolan MacMillan G; 56 Alex Mateas G/C; Defensive linemen: 76 Landon Cohen DT; 92 Zack Evans DT; 41 Arnaud Gascon-Nadon DE; 95 Moton Hopkins DT; 94 Cleyon Laing DT; 90 Andrew Marshall DE; 99 Connor Williams DT	Linebackers: 10 Serderius Bryant; 45 Damaso Munoz; 6 Antoine Pruneau; 44 Taylor Reed; Defensive backs: 46 Jean-Philippe Bolduc; 24 Jerrell Gavins; 23 Forrest Hightower; 15 Keelan Johnson; 14 Abdul Kanneh; 22 Jeff Richards; 34 Jonathan Rose; 28 Nick Taylor; 33 Dan West; 21 Mitchell White	Special teams: 52 Tanner Doll LS; 43 Ray Early K/P; 39 Zack Medeiros P/K; Practice roster: 65 Randy Beardy G; 96 Marcus Benard DE; 19 Imoan Claiborne DB; 57 Quinterrius Eatmon T; 93 Miles Grooms DE; 84 John Harris SB; 98 Paul Hazel DE; 35 Kevin Jackson LB; 87 Joshua Stangby WR; 42 Herve Tonye-Tonye LB	Injured list: 31 John Boyett LB; 36 Mikaël Charland DB; 43 Olivier Goulet-Veilleux LB; 38 Tristan Jackson DB; 16 Brock Jensen QB; 48 Jeremiah Kose LB; 49 Ettore Lattanzio DT; 37 Mossis Madu RB; 50 Kevin Malcolm LS; 30 Chris Milo K; 97 Mike Moore DE/DT; 17 Ronnie Pfeffer P; 29 William Powell RB; 55 SirVincent Rogers T; 47 Nigel Romick DE; 59 Jake Silas T; 91 Aston Whiteside DE; 80 Chris Williams WR; Italics indicate International player

== Coaching staff ==
2016 Ottawa Redblacks staff
Front office: Owner – Jeff Hunt; President and CEO – Bernie Ashe; General Manager – Marcel Desjardins; Assistant General Manager – Brock Sunderland; Director of player personnel – Jeremy Snyder; Pro Scout – Jean-Marc Edme; Football Operations Assistant – Pier-Yves Lavergne; Coordinator, Football Administration – Joey Swarbrick; Video Coordinator – Colin Farquharson; Assistant Video Coordinator – Braun Gheller; Head coaches: Head coach – Rick Campbell; Offensive coaches: Offensive coordinator – Jaime Elizondo; Offensive line – Bryan Chiu; Receivers – Travis Moore; Running Backs – Beau Walker; Offensive assistant – Patrick Bourgon	Defensive coaches: Defensive coordinator – Mark Nelson; Defensive line – Leroy Blugh; Defensive backs – Ike Charlton; Linebackers – Derek Oswalt; Special teams coaches: Special teams coordinator – Bob Dyce; → Coaching staff
