= 2016 Saskatchewan Roughriders season =

CFL team season

- General manager: Chris Jones
- Head coach: Chris Jones
- Home stadium: Mosaic Stadium at Taylor Field

Results
- Record: 5–13
- Division place: 5th, West
- Playoffs: did not qualify
- Team MOP: Naaman Roosevelt
- Team MOC: Tyler Crapigna
- Team MOR: Justin Cox

Uniform

The 2016 Saskatchewan Roughriders season was the 59th season for the team in the Canadian Football League (CFL) and their 107th season overall. The Roughriders finished in fifth place in the West Division with a 5–13 record and missed the playoffs for the second straight year.

The Roughriders improved upon their 3–15 record from 2015, but were eliminated from the playoffs three days after recording their fourth win, making this the second straight season that the Roughriders missed the playoffs. For the fourth consecutive season, the club held their training camp at Griffiths Stadium in Saskatoon with the main camp beginning on May 29. In week 16 on October 10, 2016, the Roughriders were officially eliminated from post-season contention, after the Montreal Alouettes lost to the Edmonton Eskimos.

== Offseason ==
=== CFL draft ===
The 2016 CFL draft took place on May 10, 2016. The Roughriders had seven selections in the eight-round draft, including the first overall selection following a league-worst 3–15 record in 2015.

Round	Pick	Player	Position	School/Club team
1	1	Josiah St. John	OL	Oklahoma
3	24	Elie Bouka	DB	Calgary
3	26	Quinn van Glyswyk	K	UBC
4	35	David Onyemata	DL	Manitoba
5	36	Alex Ogbongbemiga	LB	Calgary
6	52	Alex McKay	OL	Manitoba
8	62	Joshua Stanford	WR	Kansas

On December 7, 2015, the Roughriders announced they had hired former Edmonton Eskimos head coach Chris Jones as new head coach and general manager after a 3–15 season in 2015. Jones had won the 103rd Grey Cup with the Eskimos a week before being hired by the Roughriders. On December 9, Jones hired John Murphy, assistant general manager of the Calgary Stampeders, as the Roughriders' new VP of player personnel. On December 15, the Roughriders cut 19 players, including veterans Tyron Brackenridge, Weldon Brown and Taj Smith. On December 18, the Roughriders traded defensive lineman Andre Monroe to the Toronto Argonauts in exchange for offensive lineman Jarriel King. On December 21, the Roughriders released more veterans, this time Tristan Jackson and Paul McCallum.

In the new year, the Roughriders made more signings, including Caesar Rayford on January 8, and Derrius Brooks on January 11. They would also acquire receiver Maurice Price from the Redblacks. On January 16, the Roughriders released veterans Weston Dressler and John Chick, a move that received backlash from fans despite the move freeing up cap space. Dressler had signed a 4-year contract extension less than a year prior. Dressler would go on to sign with the Winnipeg Blue Bombers, while Chick moved east to sign with the Hamilton Tiger-Cats. On January 17, the Roughriders signed veteran defensive lineman Shawn Lemon. On January 20, the Roughriders restructured the contract of Darian Durant, a move that freed up cap space.

In the days leading up to CFL Free Agency, the Roughriders re-signed Spencer Moore and Rob Bagg, and on free agency day, re-signed veteran offensive lineman Chris Best. Veteran linebacker Shea Emry would announce his retirement from the league. The Roughriders would be busy during free agency, signing receivers John Chiles, Jeremy Kelley and Shamawd Chambers, offensive lineman Andrew Jones, linebacker Greg Jones, running back Curtis Steele, returner Kendial Lawrence and defensive lineman Justin Capicciotti. They would also acquire defensive backs Graig Newman, Otha Foster and Ed Gainey. The team would make trades as well, acquiring Bruce Campbell from the Argonauts and Tevaughn Campbell from the Stampeders. There would be releases as well, such as Keenan MacDougall and Jake Doughty.

On March 23, 2016, the Roughriders released an updated version of their logo that has been used since 1985. That same day, the Roughriders signed former Stampeders national running back Matt Walter.

== Pre-season ==
The 2016 season was the Roughriders' final season at Mosaic Stadium at Taylor Field, where they played for their first 107 years of existence. The new Mosaic Stadium, under construction during the 2016 CFL season, was completed in late 2016. The Roughriders subsequently moved into the stadium in time for the 2017 season. In December 2015, the team launched its "Farewell Season" campaign, which featured tributes leading up to and during the season, and branded merchandise featuring a commemorative logo.

Week	Date	Kickoff	Opponent	Results		TV	Venue	Attendance	Summary
Week	Date	Kickoff	Opponent	Score	Record	TV	Venue	Attendance	Summary
A	Sat, June 11	7:00 p.m. CST	vs. BC Lions	L 16–28	0–1	TSN	Mosaic Stadium	16,141	Recap
B	Sat, June 18	2:00 p.m. CST	at Edmonton Eskimos	L 11–25	0–2	None	Commonwealth Stadium	29,416	Recap

# Games played with white uniforms.

== Regular season ==
=== Season standings ===
West Division
Team	GP	W	L	T	Pts	PF	PA	Div	Stk	
Calgary Stampeders	18	15	2	1	31	586	369	9–1	L1	Details
BC Lions	18	12	6	0	24	545	454	5–5	W3	Details
Winnipeg Blue Bombers	18	11	7	0	22	497	454	5–5	W1	Details
Edmonton Eskimos	18	10	8	0	20	549	496	5–5	W2	Details
Saskatchewan Roughriders	18	5	13	0	10	350	530	1–9	L3	Details

=== Schedule ===
Week	Date	Kickoff	Opponent	Results		TV	Venue	Attendance	Summary
Week	Date	Kickoff	Opponent	Score	Record	TV	Venue	Attendance	Summary
1	Bye								
2	Thurs, June 30	8:00 p.m. CST	vs. Toronto Argonauts	L 17–30	0–1	TSN/RDS2/ESPN2	Mosaic Stadium	29,896	Recap
3	Fri, July 8	8:00 p.m. CST	at Edmonton Eskimos	L 36–39 (OT)	0–2	TSN/RDS/ESPN2	Commonwealth Stadium	34,196	Recap
ǁ 4 ǁ	Sat, July 16	5:00 p.m. CST	vs. BC Lions	L 27–40	0–3	TSN/RDS	Mosaic Stadium	31,014	Recap
5	Fri, July 22	7:00 p.m. CST	vs. Ottawa Redblacks	W 30–29	1–3	TSN/RDS2	Mosaic Stadium	30,172	Recap
6	Fri, July 29	5:00 p.m. CST	at Montreal Alouettes	L 3–41	1–4	TSN/RDS	Molson Stadium	20,018	Recap
7	Thurs, Aug 4	8:00 p.m. CST	at Calgary Stampeders	L 15–35	1–5	TSN/RDS2/ESPN2	McMahon Stadium	28,532	Recap
8	Sat, Aug 13	5:00 p.m. CST	vs. Calgary Stampeders	L 10–19	1–6	TSN	Mosaic Stadium	33,427	Recap
9	Sat, Aug 20	5:00 p.m. CST	at Hamilton Tiger-Cats	L 7–53	1–7	TSN	Tim Hortons Field	24,166	Recap
10	Fri, Aug 26	8:00 p.m. CST	at Edmonton Eskimos	L 25–33	1–8	TSN/RDS2/ESPN2	Commonwealth Stadium	37,168	Recap
ǁ11ǁ	Sun, Sep 4	1:00 p.m. CST	vs. Winnipeg Blue Bombers	L 25–28	1–9	TSN	Mosaic Stadium	33,427	Recap
12	Sat, Sept 10	2:00 p.m. CST	at Winnipeg Blue Bombers	L 10–17	1–10	TSN	Investors Group Field	33,234	Recap
13	Sun, Sept 18	2:30 p.m. CST	vs. Edmonton Eskimos	W 26–23 (OT)	2–10	TSN	Mosaic Stadium	30,328	Recap
14	Sat, Sept 24	7:30 p.m. CST	vs. Hamilton Tiger-Cats	W 20–18	3–10	TSN	Mosaic Stadium	30,029	Recap
15	Bye								
16	Fri, Oct 7	5:00 p.m. CST	at Ottawa Redblacks	W 30–32 (OT)	4–10	TSN	TD Place Stadium	24,668	Recap
17	Sat, Oct 15	2:00 p.m. CST	at Toronto Argonauts	W 29–11	5–10	TSN	BMO Field	15,023	Recap
18	Sat, Oct 22	2:00 p.m. CST	vs. Montreal Alouettes	L 14–19	5–11	TSN/RDS	Mosaic Stadium	30,223	Recap
19	Sat, Oct 29	5:00 p.m. CST	vs. BC Lions	L 6–24	5–12	TSN	Mosaic Stadium	33,427	Recap
20	Sat, Nov 5	5:00 p.m. CST	at BC Lions	L 18–41	5–13	TSN	BC Place	26,481	Recap

# Games played with primary home uniforms.
# Games played with white uniforms.
ǁ # ǁ Games played with retro alternate uniforms.

== Roster ==
2016 Saskatchewan Roughriders final roster
**Quarterbacks**: 16 Brandon Bridge; 8 Mitchell Gale; 15 G. J. Kinne; **Running backs**: 33 Joe McKnight; 22 Greg Morris; 37 Bryn Roy; **Receivers**: 6 Rob Bagg; 81 Phil Bates; 85 Kadron Boone; 84 Joe Craig; 9 Nic Demski; 88 Caleb Holley; 86 Joshua Stanford	**Offensive linemen**: 67 Dan Clark C; 68 Thaddeus Coleman T; 69 Kennedy Estelle G/T; 64 Andrew Jones G/C; 59 Josiah St. John G; 53 Matt Vonk G; **Defensive linemen**: 91 Gregory Alexandre DT; 97 Ivan Brown DE; 52 Kaelin Burnett DE; 74 Makana Henry DT; 95 Corvey Irvin DT; 5 Willie Jefferson DE; 99 A.C. Leonard DE; 98 Ese Mrabure-Ajufo DT/DE; 0 Jonathan Newsome DE; **Special teams**: 18 Josh Bartel P; 76 Randy Chevrier LS; 21 Tyler Crapigna K	**Linebackers**: 27 Kevin Francis; 50 Marvin Golding; 48 Dillon Grondin; 41 Korey Jones; 49 Jeff Knox; 54 Henoc Muamba; **Defensive backs**: 28 Royce Adams; 10 Fred Bennett; 26 Tevaughn Campbell; 20 Otha Foster; 11 Ed Gainey; 30 Tyler Hunter; 32 Andrew Lue; 42 Graig Newman; 45 Kacy Rodgers; **Practice Roster**: 89 Etauj Allen WR; 7 Marshaun Coprich RB; 51 Marcus Hall G/T; 72 Kenny Horsley DT; 70 Kelvin Muamba WR; 77 Jordan Reaves DE; 71 Randy Roseway WR	**Injured list**: 90 Dylan Ainsworth DE; 66 Chris Best G; 17 Shamawd Chambers WR; 3 Ricky Collins SB; 31 Justin Cox DB; 4 Darian Durant QB; 12 Armanti Edwards SB; 47 Sam Eguavoen LB; 83 Jeff Fuller WR; 94 Linden Gaydosh DT; 65 Dillon Guy G; 24 Jeff Hecht DB; 46 Jorgen Hus LS; 1 Buddy Jackson DB; 35 Greg Jones LB; 61 Jarriel King G/T; 57 Brendon LaBatte G; 96 Greg Milhouse DT; 80 Spencer Moore FB; 38 Eric Norwood DE; 82 Naaman Roosevelt SB; 2 Curtis Steele RB; 43 Levi Steinhauer FB; 39 Quinn Van Gylswyk K; 14 Matt Walter RB; 19 Jake Waters QB; 25 Matt Webster DB; 75 Jonathan Williams DT; Italics indicate International player **Bold** indicates Global player

== Coaching staff ==
2016 Saskatchewan Roughriders staff
Front office: President and ceo – Craig Reynolds; General manager and director of football operations – Chris Jones; U.S. Scout – Ron Selesky; Manager of Media Relations & Football Communications – Ryan Pollock; Director of athletic therapy – Ivan Gutfriend; Manager of equipment – Gordon Gilroy; Manager of football research and development – Chad Hudson; Manager of football administration – Aaron Thompson; Head coaches: Head coach – Chris Jones; Assistant head coach – Stephen McAdoo; Offensive coaches: Offensive coordinator – Stephen McAdoo; Quarterbacks & Passing Game Coordinator – Jarious Jackson; Offensive line – Mike Scheper; Wide Receivers - Markus Howell; Running backs – Craig Davoren	Defensive coaches: Defensive coordinator – Chris Jones; Defensive line – Ed Philion; Linebackers – Phillip Lolley; Defensive backs – Jason Shivers; Special teams coaches: Special teams coordinator – Craig Dickenson; Special teams assistant – Craig Davoren; Strength and conditioning: Strength and conditioning coordinator – Dan Farthing; → Coaching staff
