= 2016 Edmonton Eskimos season =

Football season

- General manager: Ed Hervey
- Head coach: Jason Maas
- Home stadium: Commonwealth Stadium

Results
- Record: 10–8
- Division place: 4th, West
- Playoffs: Lost East Final
- Team MOP: Mike Reilly
- Team MOC: Sean Whyte
- Team MOR: Brandon Zylstra

Uniform

The 2016 Edmonton Eskimos season was the 59th season for the team in the Canadian Football League (CFL) and their 68th overall. The Eskimos finished in fourth place in the West Division with a 10–8 record, and qualified for the playoffs via the "crossover" rule. The Eskimos attempted to repeat as Grey Cup champions. This was the first season under head coach Jason Maas and fourth under general manager Ed Hervey.

The Eskimos qualified for the playoffs for the third straight season following losses by the Toronto Argonauts and Montreal Alouettes during their week 17 bye.

== Offseason ==
=== CFL draft ===
The 2016 CFL draft took place on May 10, 2016.

Round	Pick	Player	Position	School/Club team
1	8	Tevaun Smith	WR	Iowa
2	17	Arjen Colquhoun	DB	Michigan State
5	44	Josh Woodman	DB	Western Ontario
6	53	Doug Corby	WR	Queen's
7	61	Doug Parrish	LB	Western Oregon
8	70	DJ Lalama	LB	Manitoba

=== Notable transactions ===
Date	Type	Incoming	Outgoing	Team
May 2, 2016	Trade	Two negotiation list players	Thaddeus Coleman (OL)	Saskatchewan Roughriders
July 4, 2016	Trade	Alex Hoffman-Ellis (LB)	Conditional 8th round pick in 2018 CFL draft	Hamilton Tiger-Cats
July 10, 2016	Trade	Robert Lester (LB); 8th round pick in 2018 CFL draft	Cedric McKinley (DT); Vad Lee (QB)	Saskatchewan Roughriders
August 8, 2016	Trade	Alex Ogbongbemiga (LB)	Gregory Alexandre (DT)	Saskatchewan Roughriders

== Preseason ==
Week	Date	Kickoff	Opponent	Results		TV	Venue	Attendance	Summary
Week	Date	Kickoff	Opponent	Score	Record	TV	Venue	Attendance	Summary
A	Sat, June 11	7:00 p.m. MDT	at Calgary Stampeders	W 23–13	1–0	None	McMahon Stadium	28,367	Recap
B	Sat, June 18	2:00 p.m. MDT	vs. Saskatchewan Roughriders	W 25–11	2–0	None	Commonwealth Stadium	29,416	Recap

== Regular season ==
=== Season standings ===
West Division
Team	GP	W	L	T	Pts	PF	PA	Div	Stk	
Calgary Stampeders	18	15	2	1	31	586	369	9–1	L1	Details
BC Lions	18	12	6	0	24	545	454	5–5	W3	Details
Winnipeg Blue Bombers	18	11	7	0	22	497	454	5–5	W1	Details
Edmonton Eskimos	18	10	8	0	20	549	496	5–5	W2	Details
Saskatchewan Roughriders	18	5	13	0	10	350	530	1–9	L3	Details

East Division
Team	GP	W	L	T	Pts	PF	PA	Div	Stk	
Ottawa Redblacks	18	8	9	1	17	486	498	5–3	L1	Details
Hamilton Tiger-Cats	18	7	11	0	14	507	502	5–3	L2	Details
Montreal Alouettes	18	7	11	0	14	383	416	3–5	W3	Details
Toronto Argonauts	18	5	13	0	10	383	568	3–5	L7	Details

=== Season schedule ===
Week	Date	Kickoff	Opponent	Results		TV	Venue	Attendance	Summary
Week	Date	Kickoff	Opponent	Score	Record	TV	Venue	Attendance	Summary
1	Sat, June 25	5:00 p.m. MDT	vs. Ottawa Redblacks	L 37–45 (OT)	0–1	TSN/RDS	Commonwealth Stadium	27,846	Recap
2	Bye								
3	Fri, July 8	8:00 p.m. MDT	vs. Saskatchewan Roughriders	W 39–36 (OT)	1–1	TSN/RDS/ESPN2	Commonwealth Stadium	34,196	Recap
4	Thurs, July 14	6:30 p.m. MDT	at Winnipeg Blue Bombers	W 20–16	2–1	TSN/RDS	Investors Group Field	24,007	Recap
5	Sat, July 23	5:00 p.m. MDT	vs. Hamilton Tiger-Cats	L 31–37	2–2	TSN	Commonwealth Stadium	32,083	Recap
6	Thurs, July 28	7:00 p.m. MDT	vs. Winnipeg Blue Bombers	L 23–30	2–3	TSN/RDS2/ESPN2	Commonwealth Stadium	25,902	Recap
7	Sat, Aug 6	5:00 p.m. MDT	at Ottawa Redblacks	L 20–23	2–4	TSN	TD Place Stadium	24,560	Recap
8	Thurs, Aug 11	7:00 p.m. MDT	vs. Montreal Alouettes	W 23–12	3–4	TSN/RDS/ESPN2	Commonwealth Stadium	26,061	Recap
9	Sat, Aug 20	2:00 p.m. MDT	at Toronto Argonauts	W 46–23	4–4	TSN	BMO Field	15,157	Recap
10	Fri, Aug 26	8:00 p.m. MDT	vs. Saskatchewan Roughriders	W 33–25	5–4	TSN/RDS2/ESPN2	Commonwealth Stadium	37,168*	Recap
11	Mon, Sept 5	1:00 p.m. MDT	at Calgary Stampeders	L 24–45	5–5	TSN	McMahon Stadium	31,440	Recap
12	Sat, Sept 10	5:00 p.m. MDT	vs. Calgary Stampeders	L 28–34 (2OT)	5–6	TSN	Commonwealth Stadium	35,278	Recap
13	Sun, Sept 18	2:30 p.m. MDT	at Saskatchewan Roughriders	L 23–26 (OT)	5–7	TSN	Mosaic Stadium	30,328	Recap
14	Fri, Sept 23	8:00 p.m. MDT	vs. BC Lions	W 27–23	6–7	TSN/RDS2	Commonwealth Stadium	26,934	Recap
15	Fri, Sept 30	6:30 p.m. MDT	at Winnipeg Blue Bombers	W 40–26	7–7	TSN/RDS2	Investors Group Field	24,706	Recap
16	Mon, Oct 10	11:00 a.m. MDT	at Montreal Alouettes	W 40–20	8–7	TSN/RDS	Molson Stadium	20,512	Recap
17	Bye								
18	Sat, Oct 22	5:00 p.m. MDT	at BC Lions	L 25–32	8–8	TSN	BC Place	22,831	Recap
19	Fri, Oct 28	5:00 p.m. MDT	at Hamilton Tiger-Cats	W 29–26	9–8	TSN	Tim Hortons Field	24,031	Recap
20	Sat, Nov 5	2:00 p.m. MDT	vs. Toronto Argonauts	W 41–17	10–8	TSN	Commonwealth Stadium	33,514	Recap

*Top attendance in CFL

Total attendance: 278,982
Average attendance: 30,998 (55.1%)

== Post-season ==
=== Schedule ===
Game	Date	Kickoff	Opponent	Results		TV	Venue	Attendance	Summary
Game	Date	Kickoff	Opponent	Score	Record	TV	Venue	Attendance	Summary
East Semi-Final	Sun, Nov 13	11:00 a.m. MST	at Hamilton Tiger-Cats	W 24–21	1–0	TSN/RDS/ESPN2	Tim Hortons Field	24,182	Recap
East Final	Sun, Nov 20	11:00 a.m. MST	at Ottawa Redblacks	L 23–35	1–1	TSN/RDS/ESPN2	TD Place Stadium	24,248	Recap

== Roster ==
2016 Edmonton Eskimos final roster
Quarterbacks: 2 James Franklin; 5 Jordan Lynch; 13 Mike Reilly; Running backs: 33 Shakir Bell; 31 Calvin McCarty; 25 Mike Miller; 30 John White; Receivers: 3 Natey Adjei; 81 Devon Bailey; 4 Adarius Bowman; 89 Chris Getzlaf; 87 Derel Walker; 18 Cory Watson; 83 Brandon Zylstra	Offensive linemen: 67 D'Anthony Batiste T; 57 David Beard C/G; 61 Joel Figueroa T; 62 Chris Greaves G/T; 66 Matt O'Donnell G; 65 Simeon Rottier G/C; 60 Justin Sorensen C; Defensive linemen: 91 Marcus Howard DE; 54 Phillip Hunt DE; 93 Don Oramasionwu DT; 90 Almondo Sewell DT; 97 Eddie Steele DT; 41 Odell Willis DE	Linebackers: 27 Mike Dubuisson; 10 Alex Hoffman-Ellis; 38 Adam Konar; 40 Deon Lacey; 12 Alex Ogbongbemiga; 47 J. C. Sherritt; 48 Blair Smith; Defensive backs: 43 Neil King; 37 Kenny Ladler; 8 Cauchy Muamba; 29 Cord Parks; 34 Garry Peters; 24 Brandyn Thompson; 42 Tyler Thornton; 8 Pat Watkins; 23 Marcell Young	Special teams: 53 Ryan King LS; 11 Grant Shaw K/P; 6 Sean Whyte K/P; Practice roster: 35 Donnie Baggs LB; 99 Michael Buchanan DE; 86 Kenzel Doe WR; 15 Vidal Hazelton WR; 76 Jabari Hunt-Days DT; 84 Andrew Johnson WR; 80 Bryant Mitchell WR; 64 Darius Morris T; 7 Josh Woodman DB; 20 Demetrius Wright DB	Injured list: 73 Anthony Barrett WR; 39 Casey Chin LB/LS; 85 Nate Coehoorn WR; 17 Thomas DeMarco QB; 50 Danny Groulx G; 28 Aaron Milton FB; 55 Elie Ngoyi DE; 26 John Ojo DB; 16 Doug Parrish LB; 17 Troy Stoudermire DB; 92 Jason Vega DE/DT; 58 Tony Washington T; Italics indicate international player

== Coaching staff ==
Head coach

- Head coach – Jason Maas
- Assistant head coach – Mike Benevides

Offensive coaches

- Offensive line/run game coordinator – Mike Gibson
- Receivers coach – Carson Walch
- Quarterbacks / pass game coordinator – Jordan Maksymic
- Running backs – Tim Prinsen

Defensive coaches

- Defensive coordinator – Mike Benevides
- Linebackers – Demetrious Maxie
- Defensive backs/player development – Barron Miles
- Defensive line – Casey Creehan

Special teams coaches

- Special teams coordinator – Cory McDiarmid
