= Ogbongbemiga =

- Gender: Male
- Language: Yoruba

Origin
- Origin: Nigerian
- Meaning: Nobility/honour lifts me up
- Region of origin: South West, Nigeria

Ogbọ́ngbémiga is a Nigerian surname. It is a male name and of Yoruba origin, which means "Nobility/honour lifts me up" The diminutive form is Gbémiga meaning (Lift me up) It is a name that is held in the highest regard and reverence.

== Notable individuals with the name ==
- Alex Ogbongbemiga (born 1993), Canadian football player
- Amen Ogbongbemiga (born 1998), American football player, brother of Alex
