= Beardy =

"Beardy" or beardie may refer to:

- Bearded dragon, a type of lizard
- Bearded Collie, a type of dog
- Leung Kar Yan, an actor and director
- Randy Beardy (born 1994), Canadian football player
- Richard Branson, founder of Virgin group of companies, commonly called Beardy by Jeremy Clarkson
