= Andrew Jones (Canadian football) =

Canadian football player (born 1982)

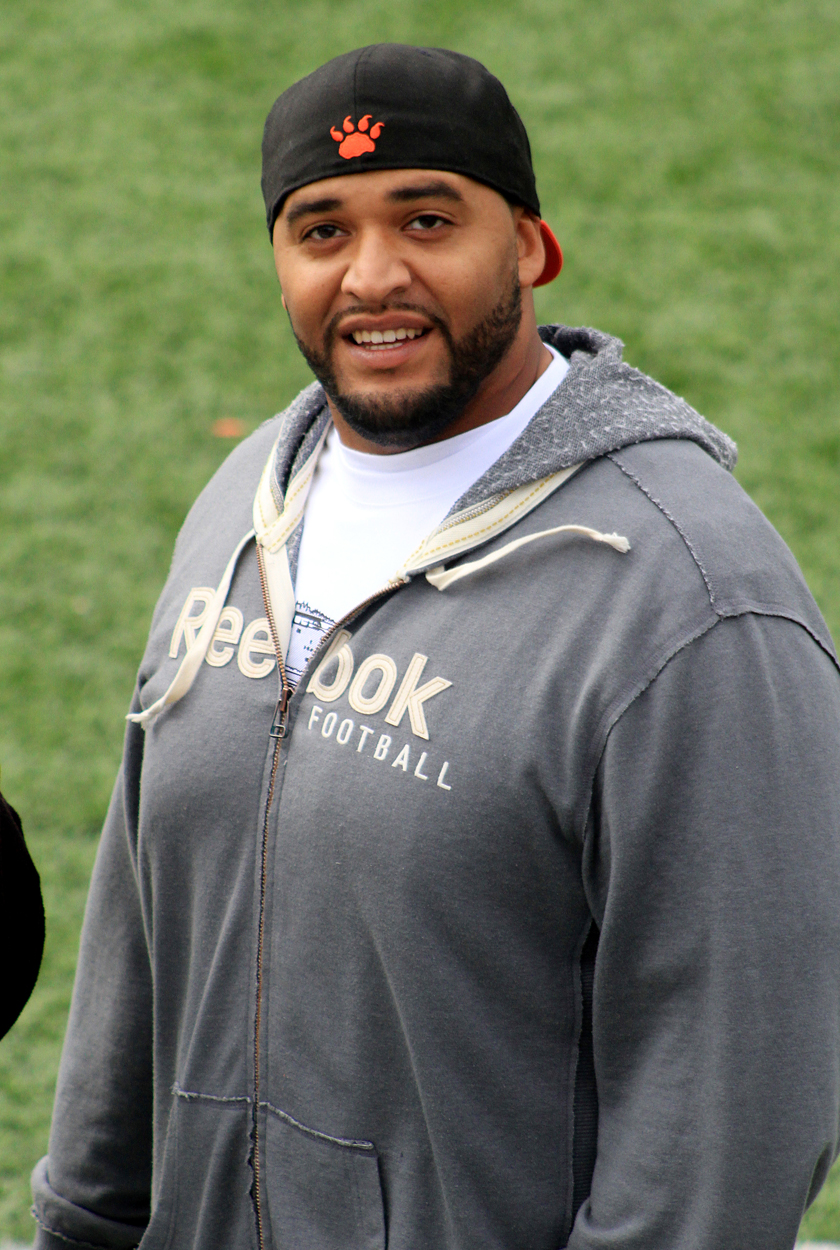
- Jones in 2011

No. 64
- Position: Guard

Personal information
- Born: October 29, 1982 (age 44); Toronto, Ontario, Canada
- Listed height: 6 ft 4 in (1.93 m)
- Listed weight: 300 lb (136 kg)

Career information
- University: McMaster
- CFL draft: 2007: 4th round, 32nd overall pick

Career history
- 2007–2011: BC Lions
- 2012–2013: Toronto Argonauts
- 2014–2015: Edmonton Eskimos
- 2016: Saskatchewan Roughriders
- 2017: BC Lions

Awards and highlights
- 3× Grey Cup champion (2011, 2012, 2015)
- Stats at CFL.ca

Andrew Jones (born October 29, 1982) is a Canadian former professional football player who was an offensive lineman in the Canadian Football League (CFL). Jones was selected by the BC Lions in the fourth round of the 2007 CFL draft. He is a three-time Grey Cup champion, having won with three different teams in a span of five years, 2011, 2012, and 2015. He played CIS football for the McMaster Marauders.

== Professional career ==
Jones was drafted as a defensive lineman (his position with McMaster) by the BC Lions 32nd overall in the 2007 CFL draft. He spent 2007 on the practice roster and all of 2008 injured, but became more of a mainstay in 2009 as he went on to play in 36 games over three seasons with the Lions. After winning his first Grey Cup in 2011, he was then signed by the Toronto Argonauts as a free agent on March 2, 2012. He won another Grey Cup with Toronto and spent two seasons in total there until he signed with the Edmonton Eskimos, also as a free agent, on February 11, 2014. He spent the 2016 season with the Saskatchewan Roughriders and remained out of football until he was signed the following year by the Lions again on August 8, 2017.
