= Northern Collegiate Institute and Vocational School =

Location
- 940 Michigan Avenue; Sarnia, Ontario, N7S 2B1; Canada

Information
- Other names: NCIVS, Sarnia Northern
- School type: Public High School
- Motto: Praemium est Paratis (The reward is for the ready)
- Opened: October 18, 1957
- School district: Lambton Kent District School Board
- Staff: 81
- Grades: 9-12
- Enrollment: 1076
- Language: English, French Immersion
- Colors: Red, Black and White
- Team name: Vikings

Northern Collegiate Institute & Vocational School (NCIVS) is a Canadian public secondary school (high school). It is located in Sarnia, Ontario, Canada. It is one of the 13 secondary schools within Lambton Kent District School Board.

== Technological education ==
The transportation shop has 2 car lifts, and an $80,000 driving simulator that was donated by Shell in April 2017. The transportation department also runs the Northern eco-team, the only Canadian high school to compete in the Shell Eco-marathon. Northern's manufacturing room has 10 machine lathes, a horizontal and two vertical mills, two drill presses, three bandsaws, and various other smaller machines and tools.

== Athletics ==
Northern competes locally within LKSSAA, under the SWOSSAA association, a part of the provincial OFSAA organization.

NCIVS is home to the Vikings football team, which has currently won 11 of the past 11 LSSAA Senior Championships in the Sarnia area local high school league, as well as many other sports and non-sports related competitions.

== Notable alumni ==
- Sami Khan – filmmaker
- Steven Stamkos – 1st overall pick in 2008 NHL entry draft (Tampa Bay Lightning)
- Dave Salmoni – animal trainer, entertainer, producer
- Steve Molitor – championship boxer
- Steve Wormith – professional football player and criminologist
- Karen Kidd – aquatic ecotoxicologist
- Katherine Ryan - actor/comedian
- Barbara Gasser - gymnast
- Randy Beardy - gridiron football player

== See also ==
- Education in Ontario
- List of secondary schools in Ontario
