= Karen Kidd =

Canadian aquatic ecotoxicologist

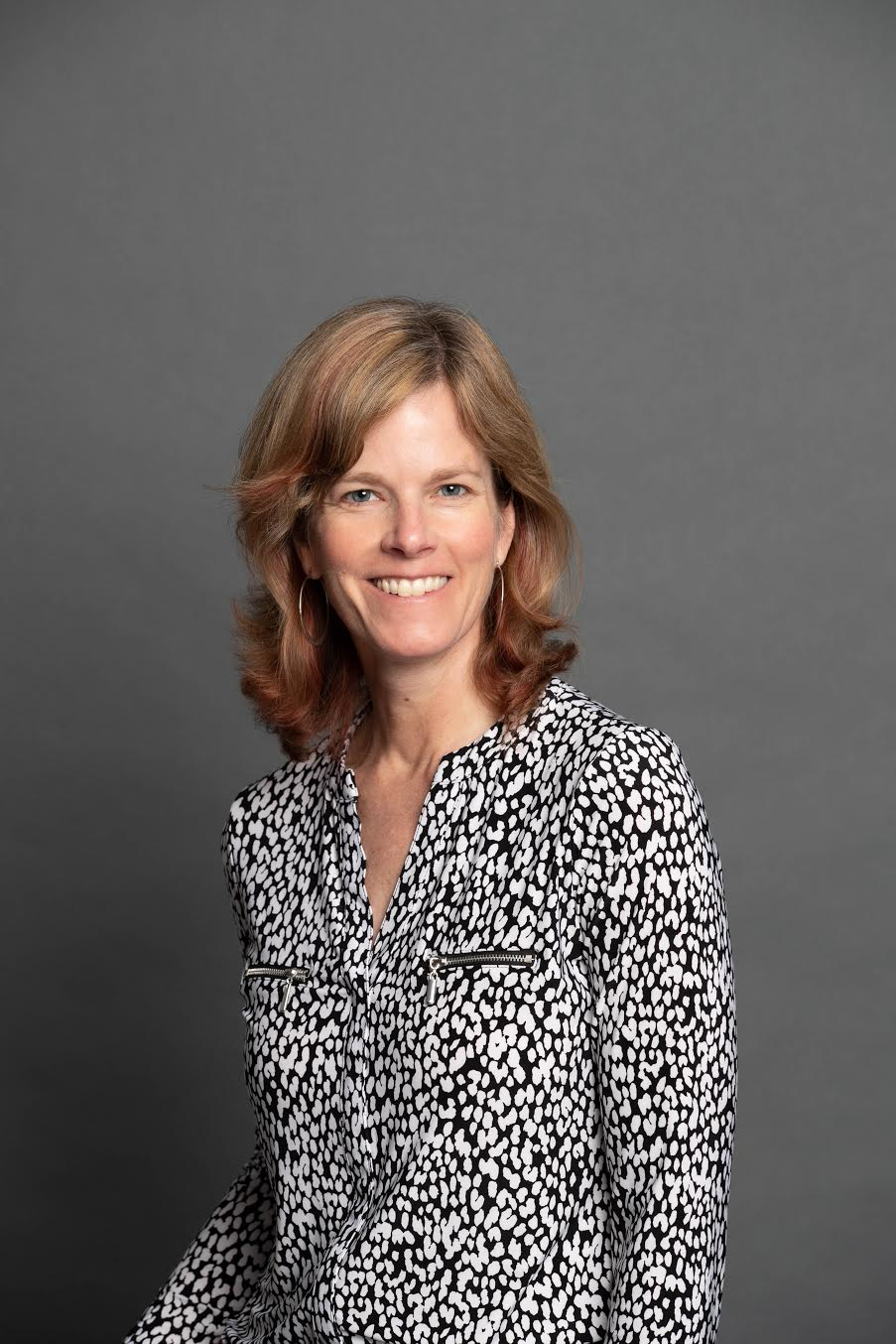
- Born: 1968 (age 57–58); Sarnia, Ontario, Canada
- Awards: Queen Elizabeth II Golden Jubilee Medal; 2021 Society's Frank Rigler Award

Academic background
- Education: BSc, Environmental Toxicology, 1991, University of Guelph; PhD, Biology, 1996, University of Alberta
- Thesis: Use of stable nitrogen isotope ratios to characterize food web structure and organochlorine accumulation in subarctic lakes in Yukon Territory. (1996)
- Website: karenkiddlab.com

Karen Ann Kidd (born 1968) is a Canadian aquatic ecotoxicologist. She is the Jarislowsky Chair in Environment and Health and Professor of Biology at McMaster University and member of the International Joint Commission.

== Early life and education ==
Kidd was born in 1968 in Sarnia, Ontario to parents Diane and George Werezak. Growing up, she attended Cathcart Boulevard Public School and Northern Collegiate Institute and Vocational School, where she graduated from in 1987. She earned her Bachelor of Science degree in Environmental Toxicology from the University of Guelph and her PhD in Biology from the University of Alberta.

== Career ==
Upon completing her PhD, Kidd became a Research Scientist in the Environmental Sciences Division at Fisheries & Oceans Canada. In 2002, Kidd was the recipient of the Queen Elizabeth II Golden Jubilee Medal. During her tenure with Fisheries and Oceans Canada, Kidd began surveying the minnows in a 34-hectare lake in Ontario. Her research team found that male fish who were swimming in oestrogen-laced water would become intersex and lose the ability to breed. Later, she found that estrogen in municipal water systems nearly led to the extinction of the fathead minnow.

She stayed in Winnipeg until 2004 when she accepted a position as a Tier 2 Canada Research Chair position in Chemical Contamination of Food Webs and associate professor at the University of New Brunswick. Her Tier 2 Canada Research Chair was renewed in 2009 for a five-year term and then she was awarded a Tier 1 CRC in 2015. Using this Natural Sciences and Engineering Research Council funding, including a Discovery Accelerator Award, Kidd concluded that freshwater lakes in Kejimkujik National Park had increased levels of mercury in food webs, which were directly affecting the yellow perch fish. Her research also involves assessing the impacts of forest harvesting on stream ecosystems, the effects of hydroelectric dams on sediment and fish contaminants, the accumulation of persistent legacy and novel contaminants in freshwater and marine food webs, and the impacts of aquaculture on the local ecosystem.

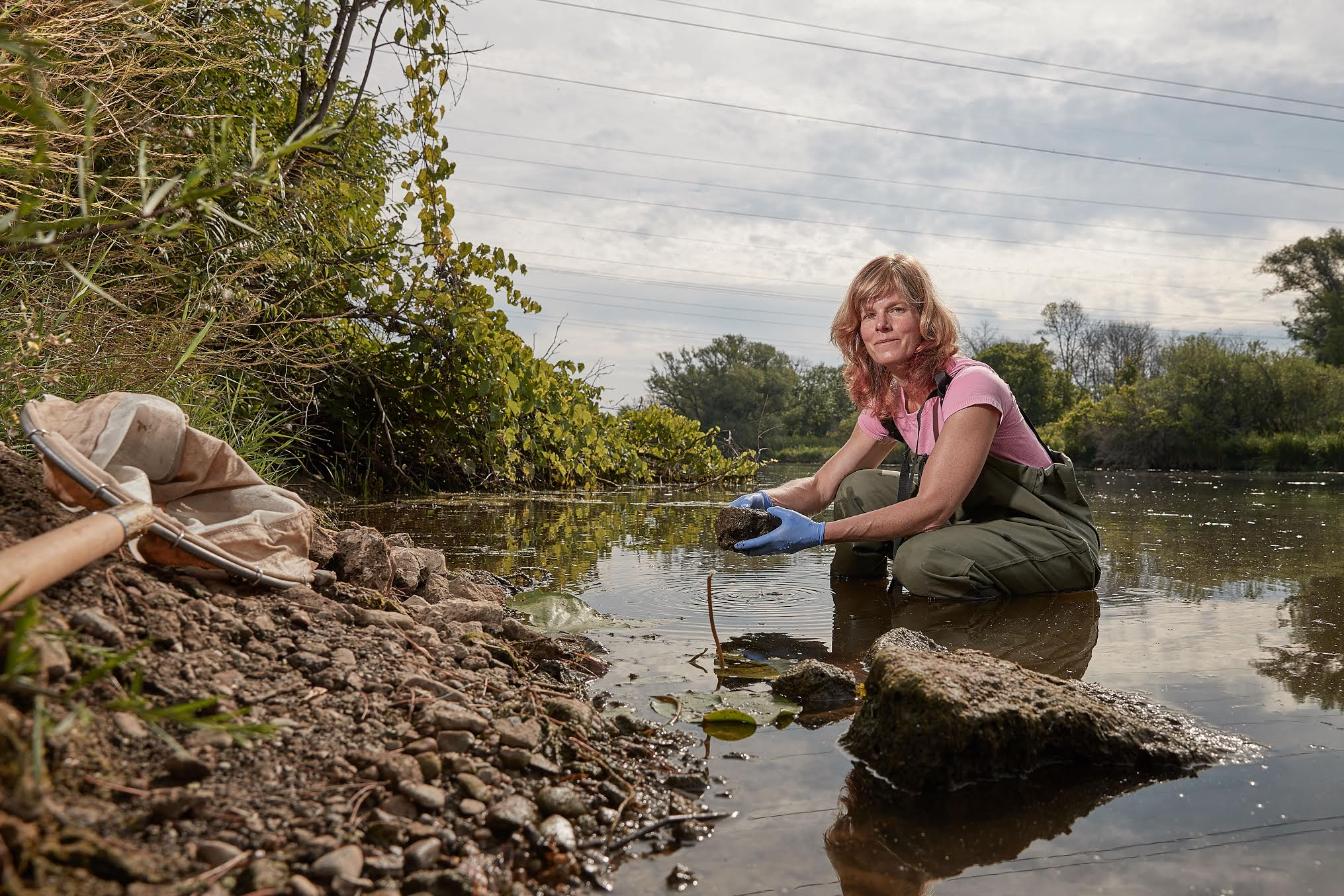
Kidd examining toxicity in water in 2019

In 2017, Kidd was named the Stephen A. Jarislowsky Chair in Environment and Health at McMaster University and was selected to sit on the Canadian Water Network's Advisory Panel on Emerging Contaminants in Wastewater. In August 2017, Kidd released three years of her research studying the Saint John Harbour and concluded that metal contaminants were declining. Due to her continued research on aquatic ecosystem health, she was honoured for her work with the 2017 Recipharm International Environmental Award.

Two years later, Kidd co-authored a study with Joshua Kurek of Mount Allison University looking at dated sediments from the bottom of five remote lakes in north-central New Brunswick, Canada. The results of their research concluded that the pesticide DDT was persisting in remote lakes even after their ban. She was also appointed to sit on the Science Advisory Board of the International Joint Commission and received funding from the Canada Foundation for Innovation's John R. Evans Fund to support her research on food web fate and effects of aquatic contaminants. In recognition of her "outstanding achievements in aquatic science research and excellence in personnel training," Kidd was honoured with the 2021 Society's Frank Rigler Award from the Society of Canadian Limnologists.
