= Notre Dame High School (Calgary) =

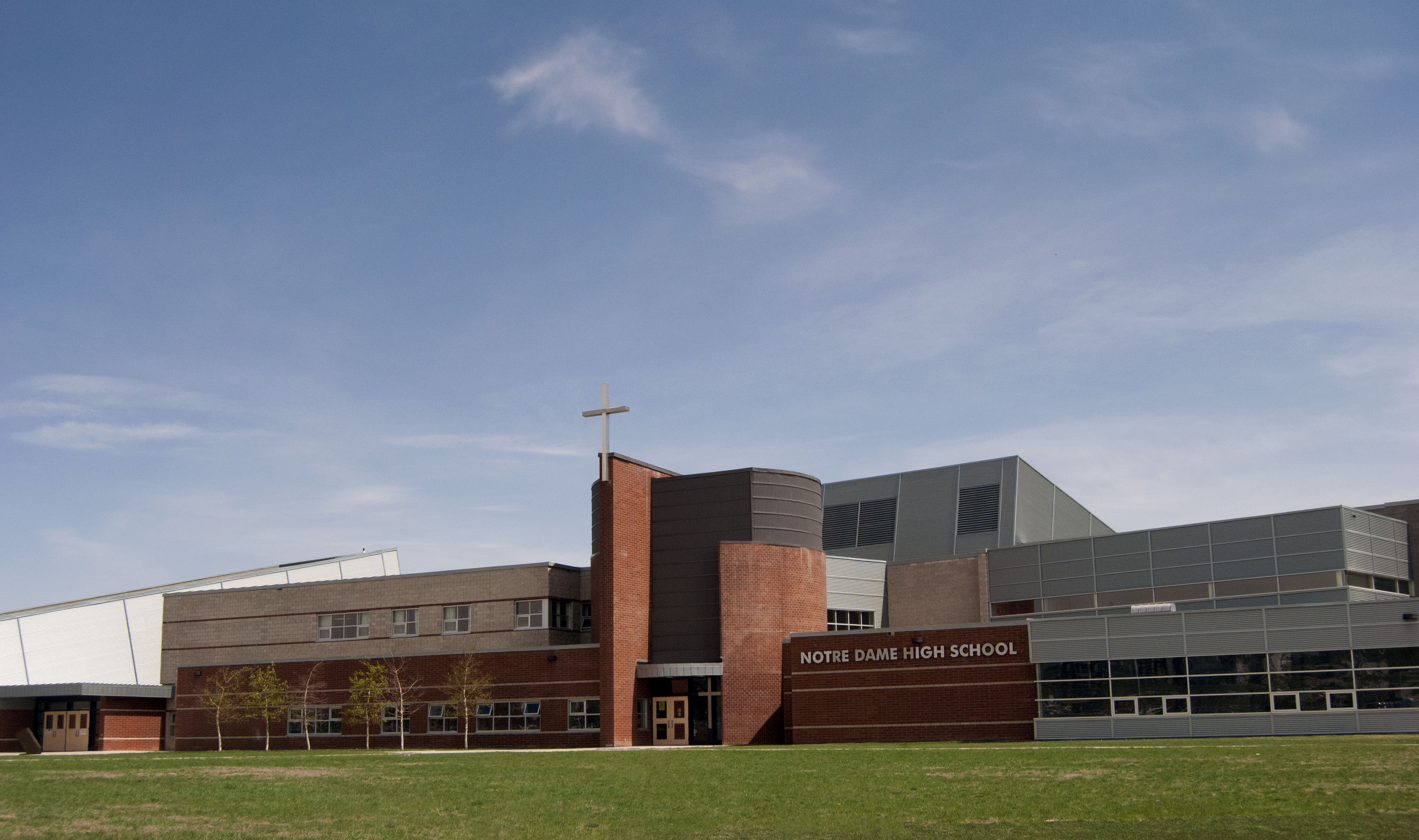

Location
- 11900 Country Village Link NE; Calgary, Alberta, T3K 6E4; Canada; 51.15772°N 114.06583°W

Information
- School type: High School
- Motto: P.R.I.D.E (Positive Relationships with Integrity and Dedication to Excellence in learning for Christ)
- Religious affiliation: Roman Catholic
- Founded: 2005
- School board: Calgary Catholic School District
- School number: 109
- Principal: Cheryl McInnes
- Grades: 10 - 12
- Enrollment: 2200+ (co-ed)
- Language: English
- Colours: Blue and Gold
- Mascot: Lion
- Team name: PRIDE
- Website: www.cssd.ab.ca/schools/notredame/

Notre Dame Senior High School is a Catholic high school in Calgary, Alberta, Canada with more than 2,000 students. The school is under the administration of the Calgary Catholic School District.

== History ==
Notre Dame was opened on September 12, 2005 with Grade 10 and Grade 11 students.

Announced on May 10, 2011; Notre Dame High School would be undergoing a $7.6 million "modernization project". As of September 2015, the expansion has been completed.

== Faith ==
Notre Dame is a part of Catholic Community of Caring, funded by Alberta Initiative for School Improvement (AISI). The Community of Caring started 1986 by Eunice Kennedy Shriver. The process is to help students increase their involvement in school, productive work in community service, and planning for their future.

== Academics ==
Notre Dame is ranked by the Fraser Institute, and in 2017/18, it was 67th out of 262 Alberta high schools.

Notre Dame offers many special programs such as:

- Advanced Placement
- Automotive
- Business Management
- Computer Science
- Construction
- Cosmetology
- Culinary
- Design Studies
- Fashion
- Film Studies
- International Languages (French, Spanish & Italian)
- Music
- New Media
- Photography
- Pre-Engineering
- Sports Medicine
- Welding

Further, the school is part of the Action for Bright Children Society.

== Athletics ==
Notre Dame's team name is the Pride and the athletic symbol is a lion; hence pride. The Pride have won many athletic titles in the school's short history, such as city championships for the Senior Girls Volleyball team, Senior Boys Basketball, a Senior Boys Soccer “threepeat” and provincial championships for the Senior Boys Football team.

The school competes in the following sports:

- Badminton
- Basketball
- Cross-country
- Field hockey
- Football
- Rugby
- Soccer
- Swimming and Diving
- Track & Field
- Volleyball

Notre Dame is an associated member of Calgary Senior High School Athletics Association (CSHSAA).

== Fine arts ==
Notre Dame provides students with a variety of performing & non-performing arts. The school provides the following productions in:

- Drama
- Musical Theatre
- Concert Band - Grade 10
- Symphonic Band - Grade 11 & 12
- Concert Choir
- Speech & Debate
- Visual Arts

== Notable alumni ==
- Amen Ogbongbemiga Nigerian National Football League player
