= Joe Craig (Canadian football) =

American gridiron football player (born 1992)

Profile
- Position: Wide receiver

Personal information
- Born: May 6, 1992 (age 34); Gaffney, South Carolina
- Listed height: 5 ft 11 in (1.80 m)
- Listed weight: 175 lb (79 kg)

Career information
- College: Memphis
- NFL draft: 2015: undrafted

Career history
- Cincinnati Bengals (2015)*; Saskatchewan Roughriders (2016–2017)
- * Offseason or practice squad member only

Joe Craig Jr. (born May 6, 1992) is an American former professional football wide receiver who played for the Saskatchewan Roughriders of the Canadian Football League (CFL). He played college football at the University of Memphis.

== Professional career ==
=== Cincinnati Bengals ===
On May 2, 2015, after going undrafted in the 2015 NFL draft, Craig signed with the Cincinnati Bengals.

=== Saskatchewan Roughriders ===
On August 16, 2016, Craig signed with the Saskatchewan Roughriders of the Canadian Football League. He recorded two receptions for 32 yards during the 2016 season. He also returned 33 punts for 359 yards, including a 71-yard punt return touchdown versus the Toronto Argonauts on October 15, 2016.

Ahead of the 2017 season, Craig was converted from a wide receiver to a defensive back.
