= Serderius Bryant =

American football player (born 1991)

No. 10
- Position: Linebacker

Personal information
- Born: December 31, 1991 (age 34)
- Listed height: 5 ft 8 in (1.73 m)
- Listed weight: 216 lb (98 kg)

Career information
- High school: Seminole (Sanford, Florida)
- College: Ole Miss (2011–2014)

Career history
- 2015: Hamilton Tiger-Cats*
- 2016: San Angelo Bandits
- 2016–2017: Ottawa Redblacks
- 2020: Spokane Shock*
- * Offseason or practice squad member only

Awards and highlights
- Grey Cup champion (2016); Second-team All-SEC (2013)
- Stats at Pro Football Reference
- Stats at CFL.ca

Serderius Donta Bryant (born December 31, 1991) is an American former professional football linebacker. He played college football at Ole Miss. He was a member of the Hamilton Tiger-Cats and Ottawa Redblacks of the Canadian Football League (CFL), the San Angelo Bandits of Champions Indoor Football (CIF), and the Spokane Shock of the Indoor Football League (IFL).

== Early life ==
Bryant attended Seminole High School in Sanford, Florida. He was named a Parade All-American his senior year in 2010.

== College career ==
Bryant played college football for the Ole Miss Rebels from 2011 to 2014.

He played in all 12 games his freshman year in 2011, recording 61 tackles, one pass breakup, and one forced fumble. He was named to the Southeastern Conference (SEC) All-Freshman team by the SEC's coaches and was also named a third-team Freshman All-American by Phil Steele.

Bryant appeared in all 13 games in 2012 as a backup to Denzel Nkemdiche, totaling 28 tackles and one pass breakup.

He played in 11 games his junior year in 2013, recording a team-leading 78 tackles, two sacks, three forced fumbles, and one pass breakup, earning Associated Press second-team All-SEC and Phil Steele first-team All-SEC honors. On October 12, 2013, Bryant suffered a head injury and was carted off the field after colliding with Texas A&M quarterback Johnny Manziel.

In February 2014, Bryant was suspended from the team after being arrested and charged with public drunkenness and disturbing the peace. However, he soon returned to the team after it was reported in March 2014 that he would be taking part in spring practices. He was listed on NFL.com's "14 for '14: Toughest players in college football". Bryant played in all 13 games his senior season in 2014, totaling 65 tackles, one sack, one interception, and one pass breakup.

== Professional career ==
After going undrafted in the 2015 NFL draft, Bryant was invited to rookie minicamp with the Dallas Cowboys on a tryout basis.

=== Hamilton Tiger-Cats ===
Bryant signed with the Hamilton Tiger-Cats of the Canadian Football League (CFL) on May 26, 2015. He played for the Tiger-Cats during the preseason but was released on June 21, 2015.

=== San Angelo Bandits ===
Bryant was a member of the San Angelo Bandits of Champions Indoor Football (CIF) during the 2016 season.

=== Ottawa Redblacks ===
Bryant was signed by the Ottawa Redblacks of the CFL on August 3, 2016. He dressed in seven games, starting one, for the Redblacks in 2016, accumulating 11 defensive tackles, seven special teams tackles, one pass breakup, and one fumble recovery. He also spent time on the team's practice roster that season. On November 27, 2016, the Redblacks won the 104th Grey Cup against the Calgary Stampeders.

Bryant dressed in 18 games, starting six, in 2017, recording 47 defensive tackles, nine special teams tackles, and one forced fumble. He became a free agent after the season.

In 2018, it was reported that he was still training for a shot at the NFL.

=== Spokane Shock ===
Bryant signed with the Spokane Shock of the Indoor Football League (IFL) for the 2020 season. However, the team's season was later cancelled due to the COVID-19 pandemic.

== Personal life ==
Bryant's nickname is Bird.
