= Mikaël Charland =

Canadian football player (born 1991)

No. 36
- Position: Defensive back

Personal information
- Born: October 29, 1991 (age 35); Gatineau, Quebec, Canada
- Listed height: 6 ft 4 in (1.93 m)
- Listed weight: 216 lb (98 kg)

Career information
- University: Concordia University
- CFL draft: 2016: 2nd round, 16th overall pick

Career history
- 2016: Ottawa Redblacks
- 2017: Montreal Alouettes
- 2018: Ottawa Redblacks
- 2019: Edmonton Eskimos*
- * Offseason or practice squad member only

Awards and highlights
- Grey Cup champion (2016)
- Stats at CFL.ca

Mikaël Charland (born October 29, 1991) is a Canadian former professional football defensive back who played in the Canadian Football League (CFL). He was drafted by the Ottawa Redblacks 16th overall in the second round of the 2016 CFL draft. While he didn't dress in the game, he won his first Grey Cup championship in his rookie year when the Redblacks defeated the Stampeders in the 104th Grey Cup. Following his 2017 training camp release, he signed with the Montreal Alouettes in June 2017 and played for one year with them until he was released and re-signed by the Redblacks. He played Canadian Interuniversity Sport football for the Concordia Stingers.

Charland signed with the Edmonton Eskimos on May 19, 2019. He was released on June 3, 2019.
