= Anthony Barrett (Canadian football) =

Canadian football player (born 1991)

No. 73
- Positions: Wide receiver, Kick returner

Personal information
- Born: November 9, 1991 (age 34); Scarborough, Ontario, Canada
- Listed height: 5 ft 9 in (1.75 m)
- Listed weight: 180 lb (82 kg)

Career information
- High school: Eastglen
- CJFL: Edmonton Huskies

Career history
- 2014–2016: Edmonton Eskimos

Awards and highlights
- Grey Cup champion (2015)
- Stats at CFL.ca

Anthony Barrett (born November 9, 1991) is a Canadian former professional football wide receiver and kick returner who played for the Edmonton Eskimos of the Canadian Football League (CFL). He also played for the Edmonton Huskies of the Canadian Junior Football League.

== Early career ==
Barrett played high school football at Eastglen High School for the Blue Devils, and played for Team North in the 2009 Senior Bowl. He went on to become a wide receiver for the Edmonton Huskies from 2009 to 2013. In his final season with the Huskies, he caught 33 receptions for 536 yards and four touchdowns, ran 14 carries for 136 yards and a touchdown, and added two additional touchdowns from punt returns.

== Professional career ==
Barrett attended training camp with the Edmonton Eskimos in 2012 while he was still on the Huskies, which was the local junior team. He was signed by the Eskimos on April 11, 2014. After spending most of 2014 on the practice roster, Barrett made his CFL debut against the Saskatchewan Roughriders on September 26, 2014, following a knee injury to Shamawd Chambers. Barrett went on to play six games in the 2014 season, mostly on the special teams. He played in both the West Semi-Finals and West Finals, and recorded a kickoff return for 23 yards in the latter. Barrett was moved to the practice squad prior to the start of the regular season in 2015, but was returned to the active roster prior to the season opener. He played in the first two games of 2015.
