= Olivier Goulet-Veilleux =

Canadian football player (born 1990)

No. 43
- Position: Linebacker

Personal information
- Born: November 1, 1990 (age 36); Sainte-Foy, Quebec City, Canada
- Listed height: 6 ft 1 in (1.85 m)
- Listed weight: 220 lb (100 kg)

Career information
- University: Sherbrooke (2011–2015)

Career history
- 2016: Ottawa Redblacks

Awards and highlights
- Grey Cup champion (2016)
- Stats at CFL.ca

Olivier Goulet-Veilleux (born November 1, 1990) is a Canadian former professional football linebacker who played for the Ottawa Redblacks of the Canadian Football League (CFL). He played CIS football at Sherbrooke.

== University career ==
Goulet-Veilleux played CIS football for the Sherbrooke Vert et Or from 2011 to 2015.

== Professional career ==
Goulet-Veilleux went undrafted in the 2016 CFL draft. He later signed with the Ottawa Redblacks on June 15, 2016, after the team suffered a series of injuries. He played in one preseason game and earned a spot on the regular season roster. During the second game of the regular season on June 30 against the Montreal Alouettes, Goulet-Veilleux suffered a broken leg after Alouettes player Martin Bédard landed on his leg during a special teams play. He ended up missing the remainder of the season. Overall, he dressed in two games for the Reblacks in 2016 and recorded two special teams tackles. On November 27, 2016, the Redblacks won the 104th Grey Cup 39–33 against the Calgary Stampeders. Goulet-Veilleux was released by the Redblacks on April 18, 2017.
