= Joshua Stanford =

Canadian football player (born 1994)

No. 87
- Position: Wide receiver

Personal information
- Born: July 25, 1994 (age 32); Mississauga, Ontario
- Listed height: 6 ft 1 in (1.85 m)
- Listed weight: 200 lb (91 kg)

Career information
- High school: St. Marcellinus
- College: Virginia Tech; Kansas
- CFL draft: 2016: 8th round, 62nd overall pick

Career history
- 2016–2018: Saskatchewan Roughriders
- 2018: Montreal Alouettes
- 2019: BC Lions
- Stats at CFL.ca

Joshua Stanford (born July 25, 1994) is a Canadian former professional football wide receiver. He was originally drafted by the Saskatchewan Roughriders with the 62nd overall selection in the 2016 CFL draft and played in 21 games over three seasons for the team. He was traded to the Montreal Alouettes on October 10, 2018 where he played in three games and was released during the following offseason. He played college football for the Virginia Tech Hokies and Kansas Jayhawks.
