= Alex Hoffman-Ellis =

American gridiron football player (born 1989)

No. 12, 55
- Position: Linebacker

Personal information
- Born: August 14, 1989 (age 37); Los Angeles, California, U.S.
- Listed height: 6 ft 0 in (1.83 m)
- Listed weight: 230 lb (104 kg)

Career information
- High school: Hamilton (Los Angeles)
- College: Washington State

Career history
- 2012: St. Louis Rams*
- 2012: Sacramento Mountain Lions
- 2012: San Francisco 49ers*
- 2014–2015: BC Lions
- 2016: Hamilton Tiger-Cats*
- 2016–2017: Edmonton Eskimos
- * Offseason or practice squad member only

Awards and highlights
- Second-team All-Pac-12 (2011)
- Stats at CFL.ca

Alex Hoffman-Ellis (born August 14, 1989) is an American former professional football linebacker.

After playing college football for the Washington State Cougars, he was signed in 2012 by the St. Louis Rams of the National Football League (NFL) as an undrafted free agent. Hoffman-Ellis then attended their training camp, but was released that August, and briefly played for the Sacramento Mountain Lions of the United Football League (UFL) before the league folded in October 2012. He was then signed to the practice squad of the San Francisco 49ers on December 4, 2012, but slayed later that month, and played for two years for the BC Lions of the Canadian Football League (CFL).

== Early life ==
Hoffman-Ellis is Jewish, and grew up in Los Angeles, California. He first attended Santa Monica High School, and then attended Alexander Hamilton High School, in Los Angeles. At Alexander Hamilton he lettered in football (where he was team captain and played middle linebacker, tight end, and punter, recording 70 tackles), track and field (long jump, triple jump, and shot put), baseball (as an outfielder), and basketball. In basketball, he was a member of the gold medal-winning US National Team (15-16 year olds) for the Maccabi International Games (the Jewish Olympics).

== College career ==
He played at Moorpark College for a year. There, he started 11 of 12 games at outside linebacker, amassing 91 tackles and two sacks. He also competed on the track and field team, throwing javelin (finishing 5th in the state) and competing in long jump and on the 4x100-meter relay team. He was inducted into the Moorpark Hall of Fame in javelin.

Hoffman-Ellis then transferred to Washington State University and spent 2008 with redshirt status. In his remaining three years of eligibility, played in 35 games and started in 33 as a linebacker. He landed 253 total tackles and had four interceptions, including two for touchdowns. In 2011, he led the Cougs in stops, was named Second-team All-Pac-12, and to Phil Steele's All-Pac-12 Conference second-team, and was named to the Jewish Sports Review All-America 2011 Defense Team. In his senior year, he was named Washington State's Defensive Most Valuable Player.

=== Early career ===
Hoffman-Ellis Alex ran a 4.54 second time in the 40 yard dash, and jumped a 36 1/2" vertical at his pro day. His time in the 20 yard dash was 2.63, and in the 10 yard dash was 1.57, he did 36 225-pound bench reps, his broad jump distance was 9' 11", his 20-yard shuttle time was 4.33, and his 3-Cone drill time was 7.09. He weighed 232 pounds, and was 6 feet tall.

He was signed by the St. Louis Rams of the National Football League as an undrafted free agent and attended their training camp, but was released on August 27, 2012. He briefly played for the Sacramento Mountain Lions of the United Football League before the league folded in October 2012.

He was signed to the practice squad of the San Francisco 49ers on December 4, to a three-year $1.4 million contract, but released on December 25. In 2013, he worked at Portland State University as a Strength and Conditioning intern.

=== BC Lions ===
In May 2014, Hoffman-Ellis was signed by the BC Lions. He remained on the roster as a reserve player for the first seven weeks, after which he was moved to the practice squad. He played for the first time in the final regular season game in Week 20, where he recorded eight defensive tackles, two special teams tackles, and a forced fumble. The Vancouver Sun described him as "a demon on special teams." In 2015, his second year with the Lions, he had 57 tackles and three interceptions in 17 games, 10 as a starter.

=== Hamilton Tiger-Cats ===
In February 2016, he was signed as a free agent to a two-year deal by the Hamilton Tiger-Cats.

=== Edmonton Eskimos ===
On July 4, 2016, he was traded to the Edmonton Eskimos in exchange for a conditional eighth round pick in the 2018 CFL draft.
