= Graig Newman =

Canadian football player (born 1989)

Profile
- Position: Defensive back

Personal information
- Born: July 2, 1989 (age 37); Langley, British Columbia
- Listed height: 6 ft 1 in (1.85 m)
- Listed weight: 195 lb (88 kg)

Career information
- CJFL: Saskatoon Hilltops
- CFL draft: 2011

Career history
- 2011–2013: Saskatchewan Roughriders
- 2014–2015: Winnipeg Blue Bombers
- 2016: Saskatchewan Roughriders

Awards and highlights
- Grey Cup champion (2013)
- Stats at CFL.ca

Graig Newman (born July 2, 1989) is a Canadian former professional football defensive back who played in the Canadian Football League (CFL). He was invited to the Saskatchewan Roughriders' 2011 training camp on May 17, 2011, and spent time on the team's practice roster during the 2011 season. Following the completion of his junior career, Newman signed with Saskatchewan on December 11, 2011. He played for two years with the Winnipeg Blue Bombers before re-signing with the Roughriders on February 9, 2016. He announced his retirement on March 20, 2017.

Newman played junior football for the Saskatoon Hilltops of the Canadian Junior Football League.
