= Amen Ogbongbemiga =

Nigerian gridiron football player (born 1998)

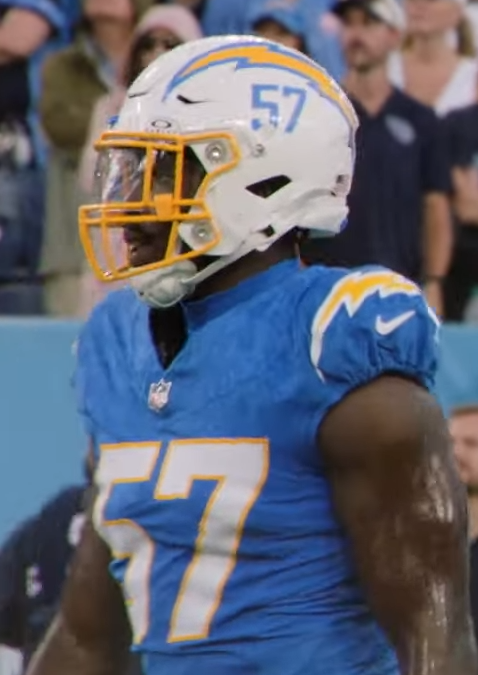
- Ogbongbemiga with the Los Angeles Chargers in 2023

No. 57 – Detroit Lions
- Position: Linebacker
- Roster status: Active

Personal information
- Born: 4 September 1998 (age 28); Lagos, Nigeria
- Listed height: 6 ft 1 in (1.85 m)
- Listed weight: 226 lb (103 kg)

Career information
- High school: Notre Dame (Calgary, Alberta, Canada)
- College: Oklahoma State (2016–2020)
- NFL draft: 2021: undrafted
- CFL draft: 2021: 1st round, 8th overall pick

Career history
- Los Angeles Chargers (2021–2023); Chicago Bears (2024–2025); Detroit Lions (2026–present)

Awards and highlights
- 2× Second-team All-Big 12 (2019, 2020)

Career NFL statistics as of Week 9, 2026
- Total tackles: 69
- Sacks: 2.0
- Fumble recoveries: 2
- Pass deflections: 1
- Stats at Pro Football Reference

Amen Ogbongbemiga (AY-men awg-BONG-beh-MEE-guh; born 4 September 1998) is a Nigerian professional American football linebacker for the Detroit Lions of the National Football League (NFL). He played college football for the Oklahoma State Cowboys. Ogbongbemiga was signed by the Los Angeles Chargers as an undrafted free agent following the 2021 NFL Draft.

== Early life ==
Amen Ogbongbemiga was born on 4 September 1998, in Lagos, Nigeria. His family moved to Houston, Texas, in 2003 and to Calgary in 2011. He went to high school at Notre Dame in Calgary before moving back to the United States. In his junior year of high school he recorded 104 tackles, three sacks, 13 tackles for loss, four forced fumbles, and two recoveries. Ogbongbemiga amassed 110 tackles, 15 for loss, four sacks, five forced fumbles and three recoveries. He was named first-team all-district and team MVP his senior year. He helped his team achieve 37 consecutive victories, near the all-time Canadian record. He was thrice an Academic Honor Roll selection. He also competed in track & field at Notre Dame.

== College career ==
He attended college at Oklahoma State University from 2016 to 2021. He sat out his true freshman season as a redshirt.

He was named first-team academic all-Big 12 after his freshman season, posting 16 tackles and 13 solo stops while playing in 12 games. His best game came against Pittsburgh, where he recorded a season-high five tackles. He was credited with tackles for loss in games against South Alabama and Baylor. He also was credited with one quarterback hurry during the season

Ogbongbemiga played in all 13 games as a sophomore, logging 12 tackles, three for loss, 1.5 sacks, and a fumble recovery. Against rival Oklahoma he recorded a sack of Kyler Murray, and a season-high three tackles. He matched that statistic against South Alabama as well. He was named team captain during both the Oklahoma, and South Alabama games. He had an important blocked punt in an Oklahoma State win over Boise State. He also led all Oklahoma State special teams players with six tackles. He was awarded the OSU Outstanding Special Teams Player award as well as named first-team academic all-Big 12 following the season.

He was voted team captain for the 2019 season and performed well, finishing the season ranked sixth in the Big 12 with 100 tackles. He led the team with 15.5 tackles for loss and 5 sacks. Against Texas A&M, he recorded a season-high 12 tackles, also amassing a sack and fumble recovery in the annual Texas Bowl. He also recorded his first career interception late in a win over Iowa State. In games against Texas and West Virginia he recorded 11 tackles, also recording 10 in a game against Oregon State. He was team captain in games against Oklahoma, Baylor, and Tulsa. He ended the season gaining Second-team All-Big 12 and First-team Academic All-Big 12 honors, as well as the Leslie O'Neal award, for the best defensive player on the team.

He remained the team captain for his senior season, leading OSU in tackles in six of its eleven games. He was a semifinalist for the Lott IMPACT Trophy, an honorable mention for defensive player of the year, a First-team All-Academic selection for the fourth straight year, and a Second-team All-Big 12 selection for the second consecutive year. He started every game and was the game captain in games against Kansas, Oklahoma, Baylor, and Miami. He finished the season with 81 tackles, only one shy of their 2020 leader Malcolm Rodriguez. He led the Cowboys in tackles in the games against West Virginia (13), Kansas (5), Texas (10), Kansas State (8), Texas Tech (11), and TCU (12). His 13 tackles against West Virginia were a career-high. He also recorded 2.5 sacks and three quarterback hurries during the season. In the game against TCU, he had three forced fumbles in under 19 minutes, only one shy of the NCAA's single game record. He was named Big 12 Player of the Week following the game. He chose to forgo remaining eligibility and instead declare for the NFL draft.

== Professional career ==
Pre-draft measurables
Height	Weight	Arm length	Hand span	Wingspan	40-yard dash	10-yard split	20-yard split	20-yard shuttle	Three-cone drill	Vertical jump	Broad jump	Bench press
6 ft 0 7/8 in (1.85 m)	231 lb (105 kg)	32 3/4 in (0.83 m)	9 3/8 in (0.24 m)	6 ft 5 1/2 in (1.97 m)	4.63 s	1.62 s	2.82 s	4.27 s	7.31 s	32.0 in (0.81 m)	9 ft 4 in (2.84 m)	24 reps
All values from Pro Day

=== Los Angeles Chargers ===
After going unselected in the 2021 NFL draft, Ogbongbemiga signed as an undrafted free agent with the Los Angeles Chargers. Three days later, he was selected with the 8th overall pick in the 2021 CFL draft by the Calgary Stampeders. He made the final roster as a rookie and appeared in 15 games, recording 26 tackles.

Ogbongbemiga returned in 2022 and appeared in all 17 games, none as a starter, totaling six tackles. He also appeared in the team's one playoff game, a loss to the Jacksonville Jaguars, and recovered a fumble. In his third year, he played 15 games and recorded four tackles, also recovering two fumbles.

=== Chicago Bears ===
On March 14, 2024, Ogbongbemiga signed with the Chicago Bears. He played in all 17 games for Chicago, logging a sack and 13 combined tackles.

On March 6, 2025, Ogbongbemiga re-signed with the Bears on a two-year, $5 million contract. After solely being on special teams to start the season, he saw his first defensive action in Week 12 against the Pittsburgh Steelers due to injuries. He recorded a career-high 40 snaps in the game along with 14 tackles, the second most on the team, as the Bears won 31–28.

On February 19, 2026, Ogbongbemiga was cut by the Bears.

=== Detroit Lions ===
On August 9, 2026, Ogbongbemiga signed with the Detroit Lions. On August 30, Ogbongbemiga was released by the Lions as a part of final roster cuts; he was re-signed to the team's practice squad the following day. On September 30, Ogbongbemiga was promoted to the active roster.

== Personal life ==
His brother, Alex, played in the Canadian Football League (CFL).
