= Cedric McKinley =

American gridiron football player (born 1987)

No. 92
- Position: Defensive tackle

Personal information
- Born: March 26, 1987 (age 39); Demopolis, Alabama, U.S.
- Listed height: 6 ft 6 in (1.98 m)
- Listed weight: 300 lb (136 kg)

Career information
- College: Minnesota

Career history
- 2010–2011: Minnesota Vikings*
- 2011: New England Patriots*
- 2012: Chicago Rush
- 2014–2016: Edmonton Eskimos
- 2016: Saskatchewan Roughriders
- * Offseason or practice squad member only

Awards and highlights
- Grey Cup champion (2015)
- Stats at Pro Football Reference
- Stats at CFL.ca

Cedric McKinley (born March 26, 1987) is an American former professional football defensive tackle who played in the Canadian Football League (CFL). He played college football at Minnesota, and was originally signed as an undrafted free agent by the Minnesota Vikings of the National Football League (NFL) in 2010. He was also a member of the New England Patriots of the NFL, the Chicago Rush of the Arena Football League (AFL), and the Edmonton Eskimos and Saskatchewan Roughriders of the CFL.

== College career ==
McKinley played college football for the Minnesota Golden Gophers as a defensive end from 2008 to 2009. In 23 games, he achieved 43 tackles, three fumble recoveries, and two forced fumbles.

== Professional career ==
McKinley signed as an undrafted free agent with the Minnesota Vikings of the National Football League on July 4, 2010 but was released on June 28. He was again signed by the Vikings on July 31, 2011, but was waived prior to the start of the regular season on September 3. He spent some time on the Vikings' practice squad before being released on October 25. He joined the practice squad of the New England Patriots from December 20–26, 2011.

In 2012, McKinley played for the Chicago Rush of the Arena Football League, recording 7 total tackles, 2 pass breakups, and 2 sacks.

He was signed to the Edmonton Eskimos on August 28, 2014 as a defensive tackle. In his first season with the Eskimos, he played in seven CFL regular season games, starting in one. McKinley started the 2015 season on the practice roster.

On July 10, 2016, the Eskimos traded McKinley to the Saskatchewan Roughriders. The Roughriders released McKinley in August 2016.

== Life after football ==
Starting in January 2017, McKinley served as assistant caretaker and security guard at South High School in Minneapolis.

Sometime around 2024, McKinley began working at Edina High School in Minneapolis as the 9th grade assistant football coach and "Special Education Para Autism"
