= Travon Van =

American gridiron football player (born 1991)

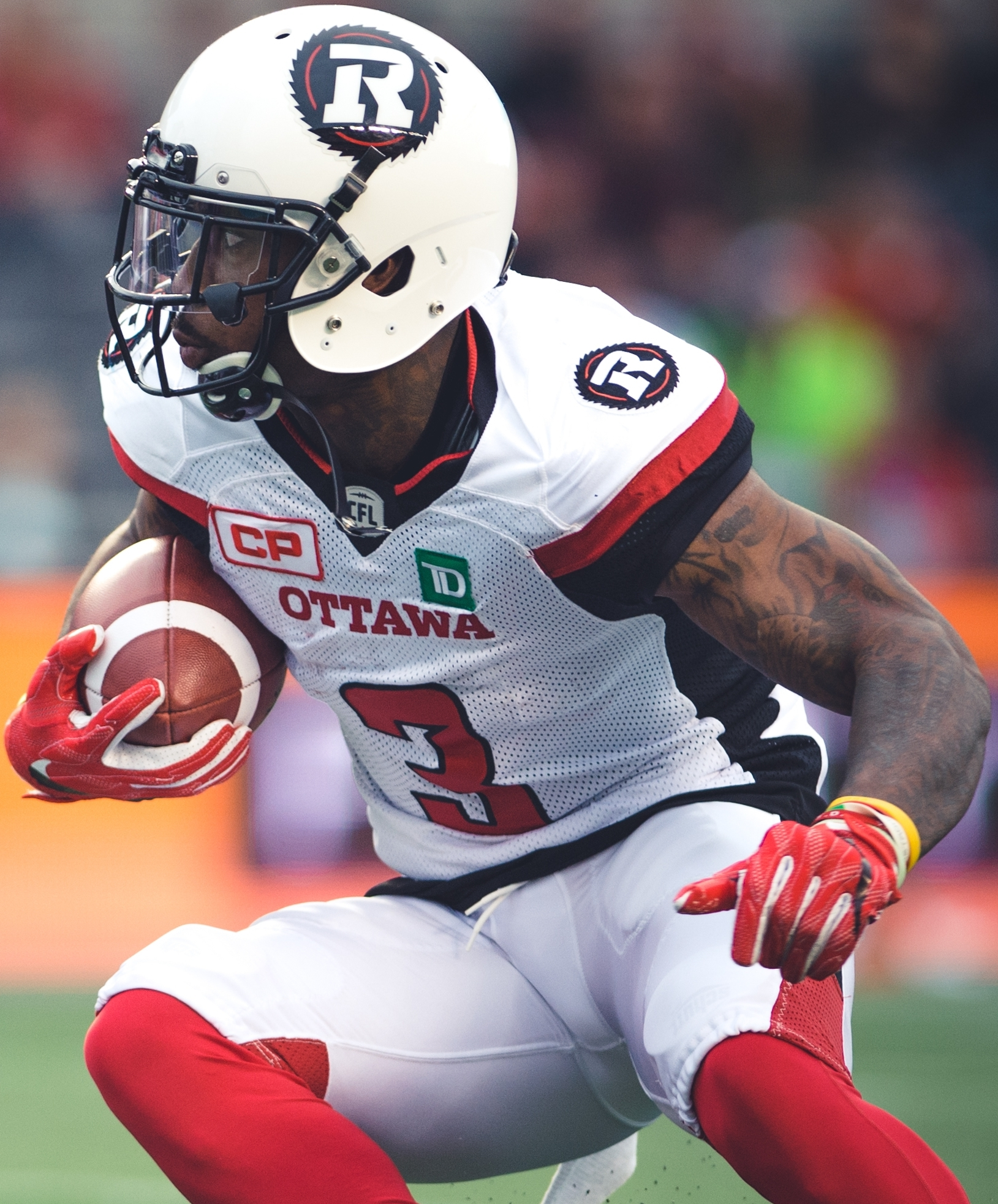
- Van with the Ottawa Redblacks in 2016

Profile
- Position: Running back

Personal information
- Born: May 6, 1991 (age 35); San Diego, California, U.S.
- Listed height: 5 ft 11 in (1.80 m)
- Listed weight: 205 lb (93 kg)

Career information
- High school: Helix (La Mesa, California)
- College: Marshall (2010–2012); Montana (2013–2014)
- NFL draft: 2015: undrafted

Career history
- Ottawa Redblacks (2015–2016); Edmonton Eskimos (2017); BC Lions (2018); Toronto Argonauts (2018); Edmonton Eskimos (2019)*; San Diego Strike Force (2022–2025)
- * Offseason or practice squad member only

Awards and highlights
- Grey Cup champion (2016)

Career CFL statistics
- Rushing attempts: 162
- Rushing yards: 748
- Rushing touchdowns: 6
- Receptions: 44
- Receiving yards: 291
- Receiving touchdowns: 1
- Stats at CFL.ca

Travon Homer Van (born May 6, 1991) is an American professional football running back. He played college football at Montana. Van made his professional debut for the Ottawa Redblacks, where he won a Grey Cup in 2016. He has also been a member of the Edmonton Eskimos, BC Lions, Toronto Argonauts, and San Diego Strike Force

== Professional career ==
=== Ottawa Redblacks ===
After going undrafted in the 2015 NFL draft Van signed with the Ottawa Redblacks (CFL) on August 10, 2015 to replace Chevon Walker. Van did not see any playing time in 2015, but in 2016 he came into prominence in the Redblacks offense after starting running back William Powell tore his Achilles tendon in preseason. The Redblack employed a running back by committee approach in 2016, which included Mossis Madu (106 touches), Travon Van (100), Nic Grigsby (73), and Kienan LaFrance (49). Van carried the ball 81 times in 2017, for 422 yards with three touchdowns. He also caught 19 passes for 137 yards. Following the season he was not re-signed by the Redblacks and became a free agent.

=== Edmonton Eskimos ===
On February 16, 2017, Van signed with the Edmonton Eskimos. Van was slated to become the team's backup running back to John White. Two weeks into the 2017 season, White suffered a season-ending injury, meaning Van was the new starter for the Eskimos. Van would play his former team, the Redblacks, on July 14. He would record his first 100+ yard rushing game, finishing the game with 18 carries for 103 yards. However, two weeks later Van would suffer a neck injury during a game against the BC Lions. He would be placed on the six-game injured list. He returned on September 16 against the Toronto Argonauts. Van would go on to record 18 carries for 76 yards and a touchdown before suffering a season-ending injury on September 30 versus the Winnipeg Blue Bombers. He appeared in six games in 2017, rushing for 283 yards and three touchdowns.

On February 16, 2018, the Eskimos re-signed Van to a one-year contract. Nevertheless, Van was released by the Eskimos on May 1, 2018, as the team trimmed their roster down to 75 players in preparation for the 2018 season.

=== BC Lions ===
On May 10, 2018, Van signed with the BC Lions. Van was released by the Lions on October 9, 2018, shortly following the acquisition of Tyrell Sutton. Van played in thee games for the Lions in the 2018 season, rushing 10 times for 43 yards with one touchdown. He also caught four passes for 41 yards.

=== Toronto Argonauts ===
One week after being released by the Lions Van signed with the Toronto Argonauts on October 16, 2018.

=== San Diego Strike Force ===
On March 24, 2022, Van signed with the San Diego Strike Force of the Indoor Football League (IFL). He played for the Strike Force from 2022 to 2025.
