= Randy Beardy =

Canadian football player and coach (born 1994)

No. 65
- Position: Offensive guard

Personal information
- Born: April 12, 1994 (age 32)
- Listed height: 6 ft 7 in (2.01 m)
- Listed weight: 290 lb (132 kg)

Career information
- High school: Northern (Sarnia, Ontario)
- University: Windsor (2012–2016)
- CFL draft: 2016: 5th round, 43rd overall pick

Career history
- 2016: Ottawa Redblacks

Awards and highlights
- Grey Cup champion (2016); OUA second-team all-star (2016)

Randy Beardy (born April 12, 1994) is a Canadian former professional football offensive guard who played for the Ottawa Redblacks of the Canadian Football League (CFL). He played CIS football at Windsor.

== Playing career ==
Beardy played high school football at Northern Collegiate Institute and Vocational School in Sarnia, Ontario. He first played CIS football for the Windsor Lancers from 2012 to 2015. He played in eight games in 2012, five games in 2013, six games in 2014, and eight games in 2015. Beardy was invited to the East-West Bowl in 2015.

Beardy was selected by the Ottawa Redblacks of the Canadian Football League (CFL) in the fifth round, with the 43rd overall pick, of the 2016 CFL draft. However, he was cut before the start of the season and returned to Windsor for a fifth season of CIS football.

Beardy played in seven games during his final season at Windsor and was named an OUA second-team all-star. He then returned to the Redblacks and dressed in one game for the team during the 2016 CFL season. On November 27, 2016, the Redblacks won the 104th Grey Cup against the Calgary Stampeders. He was released on June 18, 2017.

== Coaching career ==
Beardy later returned to Windsor as an offensive line coach.
