= Alex Ogbongbemiga =

Nigerian gridiron football player (born 1993)

No. 32
- Position: Linebacker

Personal information
- Born: March 2, 1993 (age 33); Lagos, Nigeria
- Listed height: 6 ft 0 in (1.83 m)
- Listed weight: 235 lb (107 kg)

Career information
- CJFL: Calgary Colts
- College: Houston
- University: Calgary

Career history
- 2016: Saskatchewan Roughriders
- 2016: Edmonton Eskimos
- 2017: BC Lions
- Stats at CFL.ca

Alex Ogbongbemiga (born March 2, 1993) is a Nigerian-Canadian former professional football linebacker who played in the Canadian Football League (CFL). He played CIS football at Calgary.

== Early life ==
Ogbongbemiga was born in Lagos, Nigeria on March 2, 1993. In 2003, he and his family moved to Houston, Texas. In 2011, they moved to Calgary, Alberta, Canada.

== College career ==
Ogbongbemiga red shirted at the University of Houston during the 2010 season before spending three seasons at the University of Calgary (2011–13). In 17 games, he recorded 26.5 defensive tackles and three tackles for a loss. The team won back-to-back-to-back Hardy Cups as Canada West champions in 2011, 2012 and 2013.

== Junior career ==
Spent the 2015 season with the Calgary Colts of the Canadian Junior Football League. He recorded 20 defensive tackles and one quarterback sack in four games.

== Professional career ==
=== Saskatchewan Roughriders ===
Ogbongbemiga dressed in 11 games for the Saskatchewan Roughriders in 2016.

=== Edmonton Eskimos ===
Traded to Edmonton from Saskatchewan on Aug. 8, 2016 in exchange for national defensive tackle Gregory Alexandre. On the Eskimos practice roster. Activated in Week 10 and played in nine games (one start), recording two special teams tackles. He also had one kickoff return. Ogbongbemiga was on the active roster for both the Eastern Semi-Final and Final. (Saskatchewan) Made his CFL debut on July 16.

=== BC Lions ===
He signed a free agent contract with the BC Lions in June 2017. He was released on May 1, 2018. He dressed in one game for the Lions during the 2017 season.

== Personal life ==
Ogbongbemiga dual Nigerian and Canadian citizenship. His younger brother Amen plays in the NFL for the Chicago Bears. Amen was also drafted by the Calgary Stampeders in the 2021 CFL Draft, 8th overall.
